= 1922 Nebraska lieutenant gubernatorial election =

- November 7, 1922
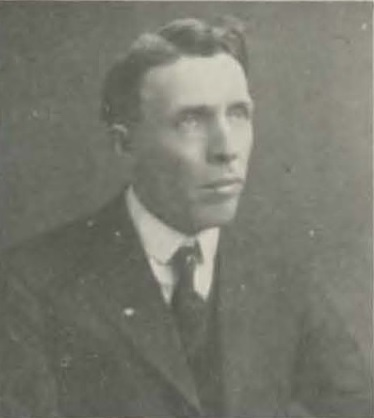

Nominee	Fred G. Johnson	P. J. Mullin	T. J. Ellsberry
Party	Republican	Democratic	Progressive Party (United States, 1924)
Popular vote	172,815	156,252	45,074
Percentage	46.2%	41.8%	12.0%
- County results Johnson: 30–40% 40–50% 50–60% Mullin: 30–40% 40–50% 50–60%
Lieutenant Governor before election
Pelham A. Barrows
Republican
Elected Lieutenant Governor
Fred G. Johnson
Republican

The 1922 Nebraska lieutenant gubernatorial election was held on November 7, 1922, and featured Republican nominee Fred G. Johnson defeating Democratic nominee P. J. Mullin as well as Progressive nominee T. J. Ellsberry. Incumbent Nebraska Lieutenant Governor Pelham A. Barrows, a Republican, chose not to seek reelection to the office of lieutenant governor in order to run for the vacant seat of C. Frank Reavis, former US Representative from Nebraska's 1st congressional district. Barrows was unsuccessful at obtaining the Republican nomination.

== Democratic primary ==
=== Candidates ===
- Dr. Cass G. Barns, a physician, businessman, banker, former editor of The Albion Argus newspaper, former postmaster of Albion, Nebraska, former county commissioner of Boone County, Nebraska, and Democratic nominee for lieutenant governor in 1920
- William J. McNichols, attorney from Lexington, Nebraska
- Patrick John "P. J." Mullin, farmer and businessman from near Albion, Nebraska
- James Pearson, former Nebraska Lieutenant Governor from 1915 to 1917 from Moorefield, Nebraska

=== Results ===
Democratic primary results
Party	Candidate	Votes	%
Democratic	P. J. Mullin	23,332	33.32
Democratic	James Pearson	18,900	26.99
Democratic	William J. McNichols	14,902	21.28
Democratic	Cass G. Barns	12,879	18.39
Scattering		20	

== Progressive primary ==
=== Candidates ===
T. J. Ellsberry ran unopposed in the Progressive Party primary. He was the mayor of Grand Island, Nebraska.

=== Results ===
Progressive primary results
Party	Candidate	Votes	%
Progressive Party (United States, 1924)	T. J. Ellsberry	7,272	99.85
Scattering		11	

== Prohibition primary ==
=== Candidates ===
Rev. John M. Johnson, from St. Paul, Nebraska, ran unopposed in the Prohibition Party primary. He was the owner and publisher of The Phonograph, a newspaper in Howard County, Nebraska. His nickname was "Cyclone Johnson."

=== Results ===
Prohibition primary results
Party	Candidate	Votes	%
Prohibition	John M. Johnson	118	94.0
Scattering		7	

=== Aftermath ===
Although John M. Johnson won an unopposed primary for the Prohibition nomination for lieutenant governor, he later withdrew his candidacy at the Prohibition Party convention. The convention then chose to endorse the Republican nominee, Fred G. Johnson.

== Republican primary ==
=== Candidates ===
- Thomas J. Cronin from Omaha, Nebraska
- Fred G. Johnson, farmer, former member of the Nebraska House of Representatives from 1907 to 1909 and again from 1917 to 1919, and former member of the Nebraska Senate from 1919 to 1921 from Hastings, Nebraska
- William R. Mellor, member of the Nebraska House of Representatives since 1921 from Lincoln, Nebraska
- George C. Snow, editor of the Chadron Journal newspaper and member of the Nebraska House of Representatives since 1919 from Chadron, Nebraska

=== Results ===
Republican primary results
Party	Candidate	Votes	%
Republican	Fred G. Johnson	46,644	43.48
Republican	William R. Mellor	27,770	25.88
Republican	George C. Snow	22,315	20.80
Republican	Thomas J. Cronin	10,548	9.83
Scattering		11	

== General election ==
=== Results ===
Nebraska lieutenant gubernatorial election, 1922
Party	Candidate	Votes	%
Republican	Fred G. Johnson (Note: Cross-endorsed by the Prohibition Party)	172,815	46.19
Democratic	P. J. Mullin	156,252	41.76
Progressive Party (United States, 1924)	T. J. Ellsberry	45,074	12.05
Total votes		374,141	100.00
Republican hold			

== See also ==
- 1922 Nebraska gubernatorial election
