= 1918 Nebraska lieutenant gubernatorial election =

- November 5, 1918

Nominee	Pelham A. Barrows	William B. Banning
Party	Republican	Democratic
Popular vote	116,252	93,388
Percentage	53.8%	43.2%
Lieutenant Governor before election
Edgar Howard
Democratic
Elected Lieutenant Governor
Pelham A. Barrows
Republican

The 1918 Nebraska lieutenant gubernatorial election was held on November 5, 1918, and featured Republican nominee Pelham A. Barrows defeating Democratic nominee William B. Banning as well as Prohibition Party nominee David B. Gilbert. Incumbent Nebraska Lieutenant Governor Edgar Howard decided not to seek reelection to the office of lieutenant governor in order to run for US Senate, but he was defeated in the Democratic primaries by John H. Morehead.

== Democratic primary ==
=== Candidates ===
- William B. Banning, farmer, businessman, bank director, former county commissioner for Cass County, Nebraska, former member of the Nebraska Senate from 1909 to 1913 from Union, Nebraska, and unsuccessful candidate for the Democratic nomination for lieutenant governor in 1916
- Carl E. Slatt, farmer from Edgar, Nebraska

=== Results ===
Democratic primary results
Party	Candidate	Votes	%
Democratic	William B. Banning	30,395	55.95
Democratic	Carl E. Slatt	23,931	44.05

== Prohibition primary ==
=== Candidates ===
David B. Gilbert of Fremont, Nebraska, ran unopposed for the Prohibition Party nomination.

=== Results ===
Prohibition primary results
Party	Candidate	Votes	%
Prohibition	David B. Gilbert	185	100.0

== Republican primary ==
=== Candidates ===
- Pelham A. Barrows, newspaper publisher from Lincoln, Nebraska
- Martin L. Fries, farmer, former businessman in the lumber industry, former member of the Nebraska Senate from 1903 to 1907 from Arcadia, Nebraska, and former candidate for the Republican nomination for lieutenant governor in 1912
- Dr. C. S. Page, county clerk of Banner County, Nebraska, from Harrisburg, Nebraska
- Isidor Ziegler, attorney from Omaha, Nebraska

=== Results ===
Republican primary results
Party	Candidate	Votes	%
Republican	Pelham A. Barrows	23,974	39.04
Republican	C. S. Page	14,451	23.53
Republican	Martin L. Fries	12,180	19.83
Republican	Isidor Ziegler	10,806	17.60

== General election ==
=== Results ===
Nebraska lieutenant gubernatorial election, 1918
Party	Candidate	Votes	%
Republican	Pelham A. Barrows	116,252	53.78
Democratic	William B. Banning	93,388	43.20
Prohibition	David B. Gilbert	6,529	3.02
Total votes		216,169	100.00
Republican gain from Democratic			

== See also ==
- 1918 Nebraska gubernatorial election
