= 1911 United States House of Representatives elections =

There were nine total elections to the United States House of Representatives in 1911 during the 62nd United States Congress. Two of them were to fill the seats for the new states of Arizona and New Mexico, and the other seven were special elections to fill vacancies.

== Special elections ==
| District | Incumbent | | | This race | |
| District | Member | Party | First elected | Results | Candidates |
|---|---|---|---|---|---|
| Pennsylvania 2 | Joel Cook | Republican | 1907 (special) | Incumbent died December 15, 1910. New member elected May 23, 1911. Republican hold. | ▌ ✓ William S. Reyburn (Republican) 76.2%; ▌Henry Baur (Democratic) 21.6%; ▌John J. Miller (Socialist) 2.2% |
| Iowa 9 | Walter I. Smith | Republican | 1900 (special) | Incumbent resigned March 15, 1911 to become judge of the U.S. Court of Appeals for the Eighth Circuit. New member elected June 5, 1911. Republican hold. | ▌ ✓ William R. Green (Republican) 51.6%; ▌W. F. Cleveland (Democratic) 45.2%; ▌Alden O. Mudge (Socialist) 3.2% |
| Kansas 2 | Alexander C. Mitchell | Republican | 1910 | Incumbent died July 7, 1911. New member elected November 7, 1911. Democratic gain. | ▌ ✓ Joseph Taggart (Democratic) 44.9%; ▌U. S. Guyer (Republican) 40.6%; ▌G. W. Kliehige (Socialist) 9.1%; ▌M. F. King (Prohibition) 5.4% |
| Nebraska 3 | James P. Latta | Democratic | 1908 | Incumbent died September 11, 1911. New member elected November 7, 1911. Democratic hold. | ▌ ✓ Dan V. Stephens (Democratic) 54.7%; ▌James G. Elliott (Republican) 45.3% |
| New Jersey 1 | Henry C. Loudenslager | Republican | 1892 | Incumbent died August 12, 1911. New member elected November 7, 1911. Republican hold. | ▌ ✓ William J. Browning (Republican) 50.6%; ▌Thomas M. Ferrell (Democratic) 43.4%; ▌Leo M. Harkins (Socialist) 6.0% |
| Pennsylvania 14 | George W. Kipp | Democratic | 1910 | Incumbent died July 24, 1911. New member elected November 7, 1911. Republican gain. | ▌ ✓ William D. B. Ainey (Republican) 55.6%; ▌Oscar H. Rockwell (Democratic) 44.4% |
| Tennessee 10 | George Gordon | Democratic | 1906 | Incumbent died August 9, 1911. New member elected November 7, 1911. Democratic hold. | ▌ ✓ Kenneth McKellar (Democratic) 85.0%; ▌W. A. Weatherall (Socialist) 15.0% |

== New states ==
=== Arizona ===
Results by county Hayden: 50–60% 60–70% Williams: 40–50% 50–60%

| District | Incumbent | | | This race | |
| District | Member | Party | First elected | Results | Candidates |
|---|---|---|---|---|---|
| Arizona at-large | None (new state) | | | New seat. New member elected December 12, 1911. Democratic gain. | ▌ ✓ Carl Hayden (Democratic) 54.0%; ▌John S. Williams (Republican) 39.7%; ▌John Halberg (Socialist) 5.9%; ▌Eugene W. Chafin (Prohibition) 0.4% |

=== New Mexico ===
| District | Incumbent | | | This race | |
| District | Member | Party | First elected | Results | Candidates |
|---|---|---|---|---|---|
| New Mexico at-large 2 seats on a general ticket | None (new state) | | | New seat. New member elected November 7, 1911. Democratic gain. | ▌ ✓ George Curry (Republican) 25.0%; ▌ ✓ Harvey B. Fergusson (Democratic) 24.9%; ▌Elfego Baca (Republican) 23.7%; ▌Paz Valverde (Democratic) 23.5%; ▌J. W. Hansen (Socialist) 1.5%; ▌C. Cutting (Socialist) 1.4% |
| New Mexico at-large 2 seats on a general ticket | None (new state) | | | New seat. New member elected November 7, 1911. Republican gain. | ▌ ✓ George Curry (Republican) 25.0%; ▌ ✓ Harvey B. Fergusson (Democratic) 24.9%; ▌Elfego Baca (Republican) 23.7%; ▌Paz Valverde (Democratic) 23.5%; ▌J. W. Hansen (Socialist) 1.5%; ▌C. Cutting (Socialist) 1.4% |
