= Sandra K. Scofield =

American politician

Member of the Nebraska Legislature from the 49th district
- In office November 21, 1983 – January 9, 1991
- Preceded by: Samuel Cullan
- Succeeded by: Bob Wickersham

Personal details
- Born: June 16, 1947 (age 79) Chadron, Nebraska, U.S.
- Party: Democratic
- Spouse: Bob Wickersham (m. 1995)
- Education: University of Nebraska–Lincoln (B.S., M.A.)

Sandra K. Scofield (born June 16, 1947) is a Democratic politician from the state of Nebraska who served as a member of the Nebraska Legislature from 1983 to 1991. She was the Democratic nominee for Congress from the 3rd congressional district in 1990, narrowly losing to Republican Bill Barrett. Scofield later served as chief of staff to Governor Ben Nelson and a university administrator.

== Early life ==
Scofield was born in Chadron, Nebraska, and graduated from Chadron High School in 1965. She graduated from the University of Nebraska–Lincoln, graduating with her bachelor's degree in 1969. Scofield taqught at Westside High School in Omaha from 1969 to 1971, and completed graduate studies at the University of Hawaii, ultimately receiving her master's degree in educational psychology in 1974. Scofield returned to the family farm in 1976, and worked as a career counselor at Chadron State College. She was appointed to the Nebraska Environmental Advisory Council in 1983.

== Nebraska Legislature ==
In 1983, following the resignation of State Senator Samuel Cullan, Scofield was appointed by Governor Bob Kerrey to the Nebraska Legislature from the 49th legislative district. She was sworn in on November 21, 1983. In 1984, she ran for a full term, and was challenged by former Alliance Mayor Robert Bowen. The election was formally nonpartisan, and Scofield campaigned as an independent, while Bowen attacked her as a "liberal." Scofield placed first over Bowen in the primary election, winning 72 percent of the vote to Bowen's 28 percent. In the general election, Scofield defeated Bowen with 71 percent of the vote.

Scofield ran for re-election to a second full term in 1988, and was unopposed for re-election.

== 1990 campaign for Congress ==
In 1990, Republican Congresswoman Virginia D. Smith declined to seek re-election to an eighth term in the 3rd district, which included most of western Nebraska. Scofield announced that she would run to succeed Smith, and defeated attorney Scott Sidwell, the former chairman of the Nebraska Democratic Party, in the Democratic primary, winning 57 percent of the vote. In the general election, she faced Bill Barrett, the Republican nominee and the speaker of the Nebraska Legislature. Barrett ultimately defeated Scofield by a narrow margin, despite the district's history of voting for Republican candidates, winning 51 percent of the vote to Scofield's 49 percent.

== Post-legislative career ==
After Democrat Ben Nelson won the 1990 Nebraska gubernatorial election, he named Scofield as his chief of staff, and she resigned from the legislature in 1991 to serve in his administration. In 1992, she stepped down as chief of staff and was appointed by Nelson to serve as a special assistant to the Office of Planning and Budget, overseeing the Budget Office and the Policy Research Office. In 1993, Nelson appointed her as the project director of the Nebraska Statewide Systemic Initiative, an initiative to improve math and science education in the state. Scofield married her successor in the state legislature, Bob Wickersham, in 1995. She was appointed the director of the Nebraska Rural Initiative for the University of Nebraska system in 2002.
