= 1990 United States House of Representatives elections in Nebraska =

- November 6, 1990

All 3 Nebraska seats to the United States House of Representatives
	Majority party	Minority party
Party	Republican	Democratic
Last election	2	1
Seats won	2	1
Seat change	Steady	Steady
Popular vote	309,106	276,724
Percentage	52.68%	47.16%

The 1990 United States House of Representatives elections in Nebraska were held on November 6, 1990, to elect the state of Nebraska's three members to the United States House of Representatives. In the 1st and 2nd districts, the incumbent members of Congress—Republican Doug Bereuter and Democrat Peter Hoagland—won re-election by wide margins. In the 3rd district, Republican Congresswoman Virginia D. Smith retired, and Republican Bill Barrett, the Speaker of the Nebraska Legislature, narrowly defeated State Senator Sandra K. Scofield, the Democratic nominee.

== Overview ==
1990 United States House of Representatives elections in Nebraska
Party	Votes	Percentage	Seats	+/–
Republican	309,106	52.68%	2	Steady
Democratic	276,724	47.16%	1	Steady
Write-in	916	0.16%	0	—
Totals	586,746	100.00%	3	—

== District 1 ==
Incumbent Republican Congressman Doug Bereuter ran for re-election. He was challenged by Larry Hall, the former President of the Nebraska Farmers Union and the Democratic nominee. Bereuter won re-election in a landslide, receiving 66 percent of the vote to Hall's 34 percent.

=== Republican primary ===
==== Candidates ====
- Doug Bereuter, incumbent U.S. Representative

==== Results ====
Republican primary results
Party	Candidate	Votes	%
Republican	Doug Bereuter (inc.)	59,898	99.67%
Republican	Write-ins	197	0.33%
Total votes		60,095	100.00%

=== Democratic primary ===
==== Candidates ====
- Larry Hall, former President of the Nebraska Farmers Union
- Marlin Pals, perennial candidate

==== Results ====
Democratic primary results
Party	Candidate	Votes	%
Democratic	Larry Hall	39,126	81.52%
Democratic	Marlin Pals	8,725	18.18%
Democratic	Write-ins	145	0.30%
Total votes		47,996	100.00%

=== General election ===
==== Candidates ====
- Doug Bereuter (Republican)
- Larry Hall (Democratic)

==== Results ====
1990 Nebraska's 1st congressional district general election results
Party	Candidate	Votes	%
Republican	Doug Bereuter (inc.)	129,654	64.70%
Democratic	Larry Hall	70,587	35.23%
Write-ins		140	0.07%
Total votes		200,381	100.00%
Republican hold			

== District 2 ==
Incumbent Democratic Congressman Peter Hoagland ran for re-election to a second term. He was challenged by attorney Ally Milder, who won the Republican primary over Douglas County Attorney Ronald Staskiewicz. Hoagland defeated Milder by a wide margin, winning 58 percent of the vote to Milder's 42 percent.

=== Republican primary ===
==== Candidates ====
- Ally Milder, attorney, 1988 Republican candidate for Congress
- Ronald Staskiewicz, Douglas County Attorney

==== Results ====
Republican primary results
Party	Candidate	Votes	%
Republican	Ally Milder	29,678	56.35%
Republican	Ronald Staskiewicz	22,808	43.30%
Republican	Write-ins	185	0.35%
Total votes		52,671	100.00%

=== Democratic primary ===
==== Candidates ====
- Peter Hoagland, incumbent U.S. Representative
- Jess M. Pritchett, 1988 Democratic candidate for Congress

==== Results ====
Democratic primary results
Party	Candidate	Votes	%
Democratic	Peter Hoagland (inc.)	49,693	86.60%
Democratic	Jess M. Pritchett	7,439	12.96%
Democratic	Write-ins	251	0.44%
Total votes		57,383	100.00%

=== General election ===
==== Candidates ====
- Peter Hoagland (Democratic)
- Ally Milder (Republican)

==== Results ====
1990 Nebraska's 2nd congressional district general election results
Party	Candidate	Votes	%
Democratic	Peter Hoagland (inc.)	111,903	57.85%
Republican	Ally Milder	80,845	41.80%
Write-ins		673	0.35%
Total votes		193,421	100.00%
Democratic hold			

== District 3 ==
Incumbent Republican Congresswoman Virginia D. Smith declined to seek re-election to an eighth term. Bill Barrett, the Speaker of the Nebraska Legislature, won a crowded Republican primary to succeed Smith with just 30 percent of the vote, narrowly defeating rancher Merlyn Carlson. In the general election, Barrett faced State Senator Sandra K. Scofield. Despite the district's strong Republican lean, Barrett only narrowly defeated Scofield, winning 51–49 percent.

=== Republican primary ===
==== Candidates ====
- Bill Barrett, Speaker of the Nebraska Legislature
- Merlyn Carlson, rancher
- Fred Lockwood, accountant, Chairman of the Nebraska Economic Forecasting Advisory Board
- Rod Johnson, State Senator
- Dan A. Govier, stockbroker

==== Results ====
Republican primary results
Party	Candidate	Votes	%
Republican	Bill Barrett	25,199	29.75%
Republican	Merlyn Carlson	23,097	27.27%
Republican	Fred Lockwood	20,390	24.07%
Republican	Rod Johnson	12,961	15.30%
Republican	Dan A. Govier	3,021	3.57%
Republican	Write-ins	39	0.05%
Total votes		84,707	100.00%

=== Democratic primary ===
==== Candidates ====
- Sandra K. Scofield, State Senator
- Scott E. Sidwell, lawyer, Chairman of the Nebraska Democratic Party
- Bill Haivala, retired electrician

==== Results ====
Democratic primary results
Party	Candidate	Votes	%
Democratic	Sandra Scofield	27,734	57.45%
Democratic	Scott E. Sidwell	17,329	35.89%
Democratic	Bill Haivala	3,168	6.56%
Democratic	Write-ins	48	0.10%
Total votes		48,279	100.00%

=== General election ===
==== Candidates ====
- Bill Barrett (Republican)
- Sandra K. Scofield (Democratic)

==== Results ====
1990 Nebraska's 3rd congressional district general election results
Party	Candidate	Votes	%
Republican	Bill Barrett	98,607	51.11%
Democratic	Sandra K. Scofield	94,234	48.84%
Write-ins		103	0.05%
Total votes		192,944	100.00%
Republican hold			

== See also ==
- 1990 United States House of Representatives elections
