= 1916 Nebraska lieutenant gubernatorial election =

1916 Elections in Nebraska

- November 7, 1916

Nominee	Edgar Howard	Herbert P. Shumway
Party	Democratic	Republican
Popular vote	143,752	124,706
Percentage	50.4%	43.7%
Lieutenant Governor before election
James Pearson
Democratic
Elected Lieutenant Governor
Edgar Howard
Democratic

The 1916 Nebraska lieutenant gubernatorial election was held on November 7, 1916, and featured Democratic nominee Edgar Howard defeating Republican nominee Herbert P. Shumway as well as Socialist Party nominee Edmund R. Brumbaugh and Prohibition Party nominee Charles E. Smith. Incumbent Nebraska Lieutenant Governor James Pearson sought reelection to the office of lieutenant governor but was defeated for reelection in the Democratic primary by Edgar Howard.

== Democratic primary ==
=== Candidates ===
- William B. Banning, farmer, businessman, bank director, former county commissioner for Cass County, Nebraska, and former member of the Nebraska Senate from 1909 to 1913 from Union, Nebraska
- Edgar Howard, editor of the Columbus Telegram newspaper and former member of the Nebraska House of Representatives from 1895 to 1897 from Columbus, Nebraska
- James Pearson, incumbent Nebraska Lieutenant Governor

=== Results ===
Democratic primary results
Party	Candidate	Votes	%
Democratic	Edgar Howard	35,206	47.50
Democratic	James Pearson (incumbent)	20,006	26.99
Democratic	William B. Banning	18,900	25.50
Scattering		10	

== People's Independent primary ==
=== Candidates ===
The People's Independent Party, a remnant of the earlier Populist party movement, chose between two of the democratic candidates for lieutenant governor. Since neither of them won the Democratic nomination, the party decided to endorse Edgar Howard, the Democratic nominee, as its nominee in the general election instead.

=== Results ===
People's Independent primary results
Party	Candidate	Votes	%
Populist	James Pearson (incumbent)	172	57.72
Populist	William B. Banning	114	38.26
Scattering		12	

== Progressive primary ==
=== Candidates ===
Herbert P. Shumway, the eventual Republican nominee, was the only candidate to receive a significant percentage of the votes for the Progressive Party nomination.

=== Results ===
Progressive primary results
Party	Candidate	Votes	%
Progressive	Herbert P. Shumway	10	53.0
Scattering		9	

== Prohibition primary ==
=== Candidates ===
Charles E. Smith was the only candidate who received a significant percentage of votes for the Prohibition Party nomination.

=== Results ===
Prohibition primary results
Party	Candidate	Votes	%
Prohibition	Charles E. Smith	17	50.0
Scattering		17	

== Republican primary ==
=== Candidates ===
- Walter Kiechel, member of the Nebraska Senate since 1913 from Johnson, Nebraska, and former teacher and superintendent of schools at Tecumseh, Nebraska
- Theodore E. Nordgren, farmer and former member of the Nebraska House of Representatives from 1911 to 1913 from Phillips, Nebraska
- Herbert P. Shumway, farmer, businessman, and member of the Nebraska Senate since 1913 and previously from 1891 to 1893 from Wakefield, Nebraska

=== Results ===
Republican primary results
Party	Candidate	Votes	%
Republican	Herbert P. Shumway	37,799	44.22
Republican	Walter Kiechel	25,611	29.96
Republican	Theodore E. Nordgren	22,054	25.80
Scattering		21	

== Socialist primary ==
=== Candidates ===
Edmund R. Brumbaugh, the financial secretary of the Office Workers' Union, ran unopposed for the Socialist Party nomination.

=== Results ===
Socialist primary results
Party	Candidate	Votes	%
Socialist	Edmund R. Brumbaugh	185	91.0
Scattering		19	

== General election ==
=== Results ===
Nebraska lieutenant gubernatorial election, 1916
Party	Candidate	Votes	%
Democratic	Edgar Howard (Note: Cross-endorsed by the People's Independent (Populist) Party.)	143,752	50.42
Republican	Herbert P. Shumway (Note: Cross-endorsed by the Progressive Party.)	124,706	43.74
Socialist	Edmund R. Brumbaugh	8,987	3.15
Prohibition	Charles E. Smith	7,683	2.69
Total votes		285,128	100.00
Democratic hold			

== See also ==
- 1916 Nebraska gubernatorial election
