= 1920 Nebraska lieutenant gubernatorial election =

- November 2, 1920

Nominee	Pelham A. Barrows	Cass G. Barns	Robert D. Mousel
Party	Republican	Democratic	Independent
Popular vote	181,907	104,507	68,772
Percentage	49.8%	28.6%	18.8%
- County results Barrows: 30–40% 40–50% 50–60% 60–70% Barns: 30–40% 40–50% Mousel: 40–50% 50–60%
Lieutenant Governor before election
Pelham A. Barrows
Republican
Elected Lieutenant Governor
Pelham A. Barrows
Republican

The 1920 Nebraska lieutenant gubernatorial election was held on November 2, 1920, and featured incumbent Nebraska Lieutenant Governor Pelham A. Barrows, a Republican, defeating Democratic nominee Cass G. Barns as well as Independent Robert D. Mousel.

== Democratic primary ==
=== Candidates ===
- Dr. Cass G. Barns, physician, businessman, banker, former editor of The Albion Argus newspaper, former postmaster of Albion, Nebraska, and former county commissioner of Boone County, Nebraska
- Forrest Lear, attorney from Ainsworth, Nebraska
- Franz C. Radke, lawyer, delegate at the 1919-20 Nebraska Constitutional Convention, and former member of the Nebraska House of Representatives from 1917 to 1919 from Hartington, Nebraska

=== Results ===
Democratic primary results
Party	Candidate	Votes	%
Democratic	Cass G. Barns	23,410	52.00
Democratic	Forrest Lear	11,691	25.97
Democratic	Franz C. Radke	9,913	22.02
Scattering		5	

== Republican primary ==
=== Candidates ===
- Pelham A. Barrows, incumbent Nebraska Lieutenant Governor
- Isaiah D. Evans, farmer, delegate at the 1919-20 Nebraska Constitutional Convention, and former member of the Nebraska House of Representatives from 1899 to 1901 and again from 1911 to 1913 from Kenesaw, Nebraska

=== Results ===
Republican primary results
Party	Candidate	Votes	%
Republican	Pelham A. Barrows (incumbent)	49,798	52.71
Republican	Isaiah D. Evans	44,613	47.22
Scattering		63	

== General election ==
=== Candidates ===
- Cass G. Barns, Democratic nominee
- Pelham A. Barrows, Republican nominee
- David B. Gilbert, Prohibition Party nominee for lieutenant governor in 1918 from Fremont, Nebraska
- Robert D. Mousel, farmer from Cambridge, Nebraska, aligned with independent, progressive-backed gubernatorial candidate Arthur G. Wray

=== Results ===
Nebraska lieutenant gubernatorial election, 1920
Party	Candidate	Votes	%
Republican	Pelham A. Barrows (incumbent)	181,907	49.78
Democratic	Cass G. Barns	104,507	28.60
Independent	Robert D. Mousel	68,772	18.82
Prohibition	David B. Gilbert	10,262	2.81
Total votes		365,448	100.00
Republican hold			

== See also ==
- 1920 Nebraska gubernatorial election
