= 1920 Nebraska gubernatorial election =

- November 2, 1920
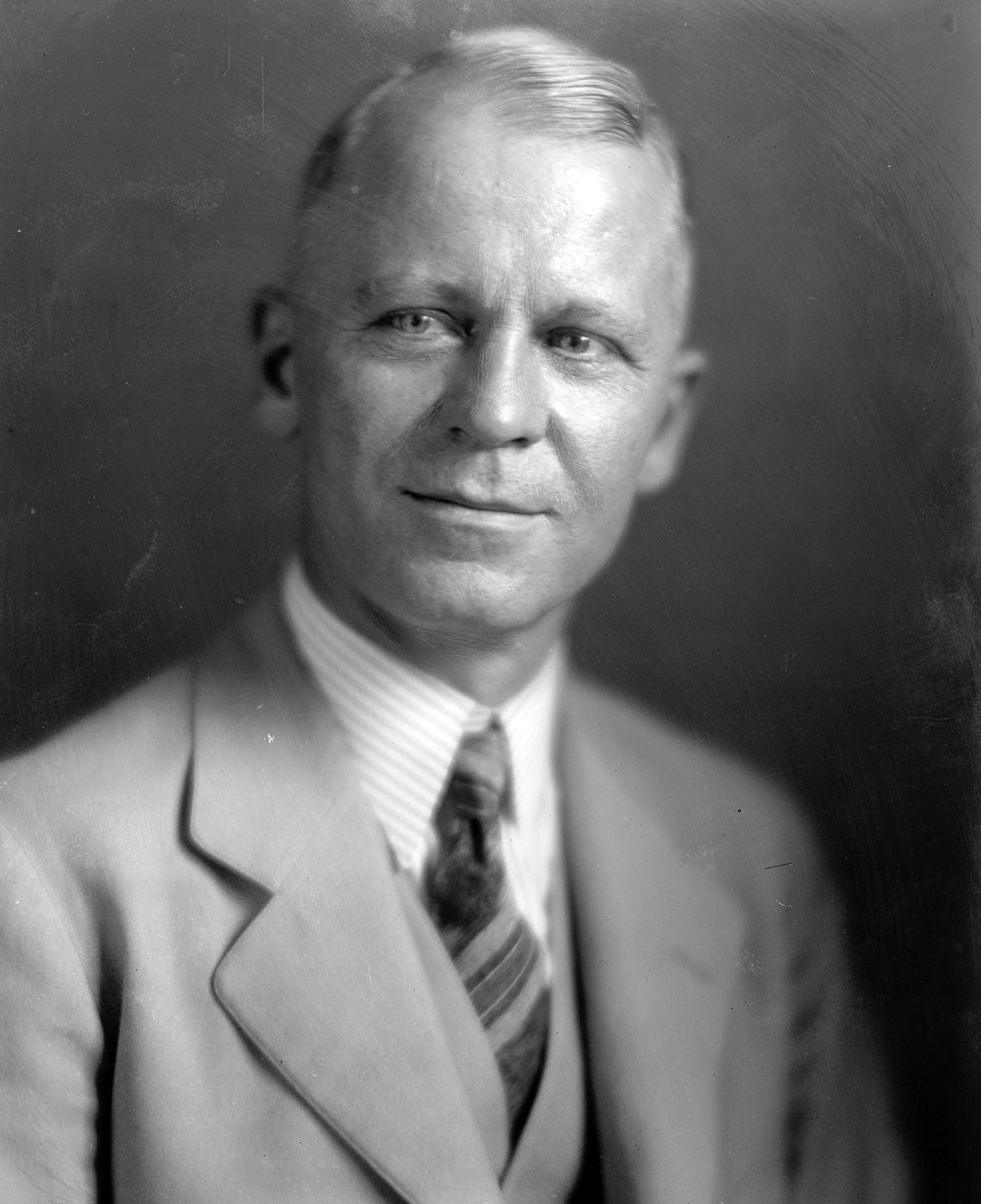

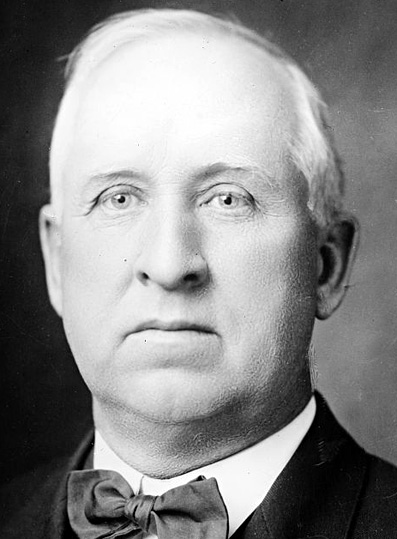

Nominee	Samuel R. McKelvie	John H. Morehead	Arthur G. Wray
Party	Republican	Democratic	Independent
Popular vote	152,863	130,433	88,905
Percentage	40.41%	34.48%	23.51%
- County results McKelvie: 30–40% 40–50% 50–60% 60–70% Morehead: 30–40% 40–50% 50–60% Wray: 30–40% 40–50% 50–60% 60–70%
Governor before election
Samuel R. McKelvie
Republican
Elected Governor
Samuel R. McKelvie
Republican

The 1920 Nebraska gubernatorial election was held on November 2, 1920, and featured incumbent Governor Samuel R. McKelvie, a Republican, defeating Democratic nominee, former Governor John H. Morehead, and progressive-backed independent candidate, York Mayor Arthur G. Wray, to win a second and final two-year term in office.

== Democratic primary ==
=== Candidates ===
- Ralph A. Clark, Democratic nominee for lieutenant governor in 1910
- George W. Jackson, Speaker of the state House of Representatives
- John H. Morehead, former Governor
- G. L. Shumway, former Commissioner of Public Lands and Buildings
- William J. Taylor, state Senator

=== Results ===
Democratic primary results
Party	Candidate	Votes	%
Democratic	John H. Morehead	27,972	53.21
Democratic	Ralph A. Clark	9,409	17.90
Democratic	George Jackson	6,102	11.61
Democratic	William J. Taylor	5,485	10.43
Democratic	G. L. Shumway	3,589	6.83
Democratic	Write-in	11	0.02

== Republican primary ==
=== Candidates ===
- Thomas L. Hall, Commissioner of the state Railway Commission
- George D. Mathewson, state Representative
- Samuel R. McKelvie, incumbent Governor
- Harry J. McLaughlin, state Representative
- Adam McMullen, state Senator and former Mayor of Wymore
- Ernest M. Pollard, former U.S. Representative

=== Results ===
Republican primary results
Party	Candidate	Votes	%
Republican	Samuel R. McKelvie (incumbent)	33,261	32.53
Republican	Adam McMullen	25,680	25.12
Republican	Ernest M. Pollard	17,961	17.57
Republican	Thomas L. Hall	11,126	10.88
Republican	Harry J. McLaughlin	8,997	8.80
Republican	George D. Mathewson	5,007	4.90
Republican	Write-in	210	0.21

== General election ==
=== Results ===
Nebraska gubernatorial election, 1920
Party	Candidate	Votes	%
Republican	Samuel R. McKelvie (incumbent)	152,863	40.41%
Democratic	John H. Morehead	130,433	34.48%
Independent	Arthur G. Wray	88,905	23.51%
Prohibition	Julian D. Graves	6,041	1.60%
Write-in	Others	4	>0.01%
Total votes		378,246	100.0%
Republican hold			

==== By County ====
By county

County	Person Democratic		Person Republican		Various candidates Other parties		Margin		Total votes
County	#	%	#	%	#	%	#	%	Total votes
Adams County									
Antelope County									
Arthur County									
Banner County									
Blaine County									
Boone County									
Box Butte County									
Boyd County									
Brown County									
Buffalo County									
Burt County									
Butler County									
Cass County									
Cedar County									
Chase County									
Cherry County									
Cheyenne County									
Clay County									
Colfax County									
Cuming County									
Custer County									
Dakota County									
Dawes County									
Dawson County									
Deuel County									
Dixon County									
Dodge County									
Douglas County									
Dundy County									
Fillmore County									
Franklin County									
Frontier County									
Furnas County									
Gage County									
Garden County									
Garfield County									
Gosper County									
Grant County									
Greeley County									
Hall County									
Hamilton County									
Hayes County									
Hitchcock County									
Holt County									
Hooker County									
Howard County									
Jefferson County									
Johnson County									
Kearney County									
Keith County									
Keya Paha County									
Kimball County									
Knox County									
Lancaster County									
Lincoln County									
Logan County									
Loup County									
Madison County									
McPherson County									
Merrick County									
Morrill County									
Nance County									
Nance County									
Nemaha County									
Nuckolls County									
Otoe County									
Pawnee County									
Perkins County									
Phelps County									
Pierce County									
Platte County									
Polk County									
Red Willow County									
Richardson County									
Rock County									
Saline County									
Sarpy County									
Saunders County									
Scotts Bluff County									
Seward County									
Sheridan County									
Sioux County									
Stanton County									
Thayer County									
Stanton County									
Thurston County									
Valley County									
Washington County									
Wayne County									
Webster County									
Wheeler County									
York County									
Totals									

== See also ==
- 1920 Nebraska lieutenant gubernatorial election
