= Senator Latta =

Senator Latta may refer to:

- Bob Latta (born 1956), Ohio State Senate
- Del Latta (1920–2016), Ohio State Senate
- James P. Latta (1844–1911), Nebraska State Senate
- John Latta (politician) (1836–1913), Pennsylvania State Senate
