= 1916 Nebraska gubernatorial election =

- November 7, 1916
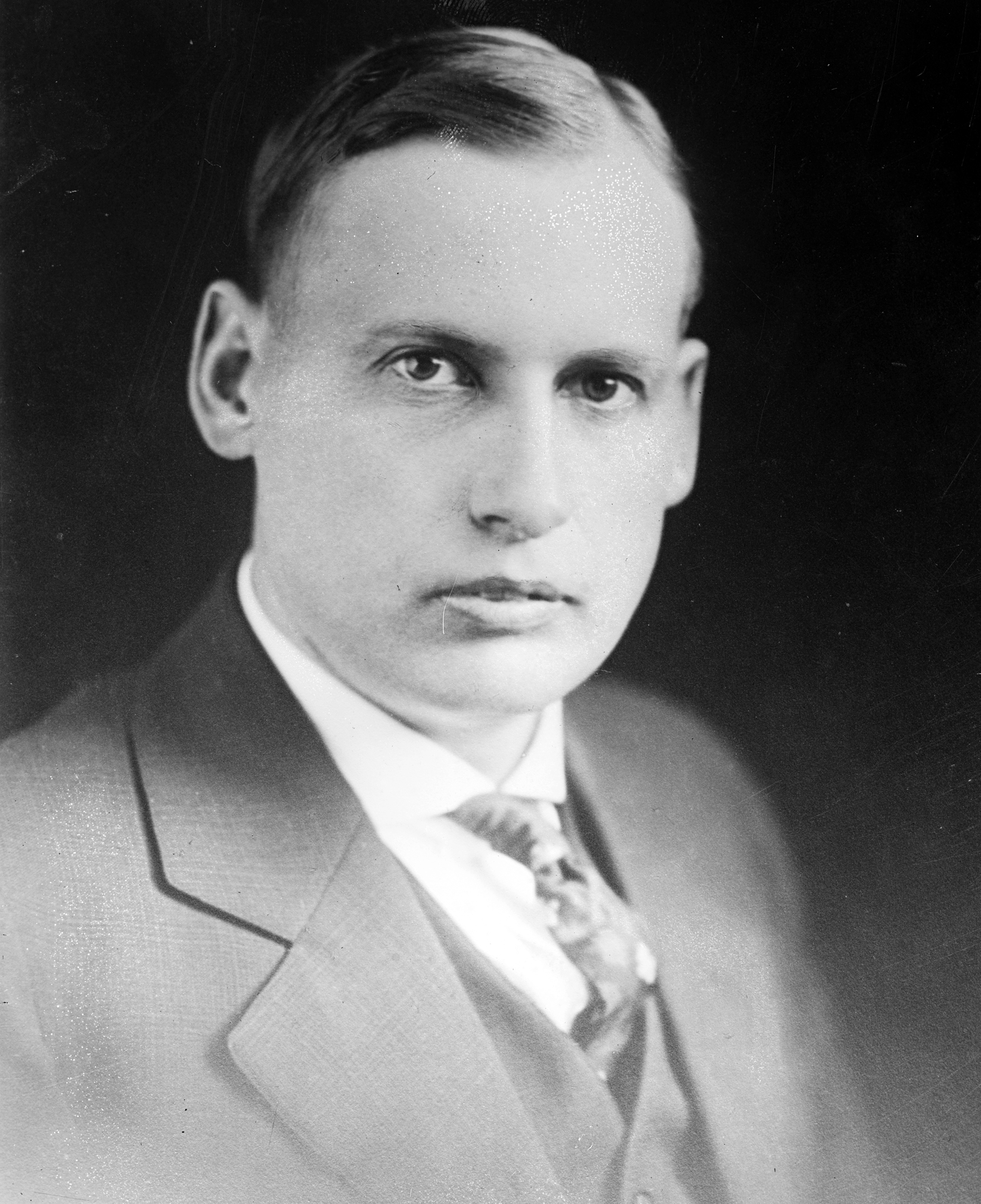

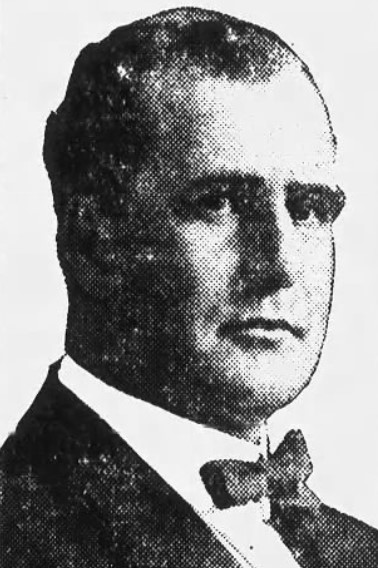
Nominee	Keith Neville	Abraham L. Sutton
Party	Democratic	Republican
Popular vote	143,564	136,811
Percentage	49.27%	46.95%
- County results Neville: 40–50% 50–60% 60–70% Sutton: 40–50% 50–60% 60–70%
Governor before election
John H. Morehead
Democratic
Elected Governor
Keith Neville
Democratic

The 1916 Nebraska gubernatorial election was held on November 7, 1916, and featured bank director and rancher Keith Neville, a Democrat, narrowly defeating Republican nominee, Douglas County District Judge Abraham L. Sutton.

== Democratic primary ==
=== Candidates ===
- Charles W. Bryan, Mayor of Lincoln
- Keith Neville, bank director and rancher

=== Results ===
Democratic primary results
Party	Candidate	Votes	%
Democratic	Keith Neville	46,662	58.54
Democratic	Charles W. Bryan	33,022	41.42
Democratic	Write-in	32	0.04

== Prohibition primary ==
=== Candidates ===
- Julian D. Graves, attorney

=== Results ===
Prohibition primary results
Party	Candidate	Votes	%
Prohibition	Julian D. Graves	339	94.96
Prohibition	Write-in	18	5.04

== Republican primary ==
=== Candidates ===
- Walter A. George
- William Madgett, Mayor of Hastings
- Samuel R. McKelvie, former Lieutenant Governor
- Clarence J. Miles, businessman
- Abraham L. Sutton, Douglas County District Judge

=== Results ===
Republican primary results
Party	Candidate	Votes	%
Republican	Abraham L. Sutton	30,902	32.70
Republican	Samuel R. McKelvie	30,097	31.85
Republican	Clarence J. Miles	20,020	21.19
Republican	Walter A. George	8,426	8.92
Republican	William Madgett	5,039	5.33
Republican	Write-in	12	0.01

== Socialist primary ==
=== Candidates ===
- Benjamin Z. Millikan, railroader and labor union official

=== Results ===
Socialist primary results
Party	Candidate	Votes	%
Socialist	Benjamin Z. Millikan	745	98.54
Socialist	Write-in	11	1.46

== General election ==
=== Results ===
Nebraska gubernatorial election, 1916
Party	Candidate	Votes	%
Democratic	Keith Neville (Note: Cross-endorsed by the People's Independent Party.)	143,564	49.27%
Republican	Abraham L. Sutton (Note: Cross-endorsed by the Progressive Party.)	136,811	46.95%
Socialist	Benjamin Z. Millikan	6,816	2.34%
Prohibition	Julian D. Graves	4,215	1.45%
Write-in	Others	3	>0.01%
Total votes		291,409	100.0%
Democratic hold			

==== By County ====
By county

County	Person Democratic		Person Republican		Various candidates Other parties		Margin		Total votes
County	#	%	#	%	#	%	#	%	Total votes
Adams County									
Antelope County									
Arthur County									
Banner County									
Blaine County									
Boone County									
Box Butte County									
Boyd County									
Brown County									
Buffalo County									
Burt County									
Butler County									
Cass County									
Cedar County									
Chase County									
Cherry County									
Cheyenne County									
Clay County									
Colfax County									
Cuming County									
Custer County									
Dakota County									
Dawes County									
Dawson County									
Deuel County									
Dixon County									
Dodge County									
Douglas County									
Dundy County									
Fillmore County									
Franklin County									
Frontier County									
Furnas County									
Gage County									
Garden County									
Garfield County									
Gosper County									
Grant County									
Greeley County									
Hall County									
Hamilton County									
Hayes County									
Hitchcock County									
Holt County									
Hooker County									
Howard County									
Jefferson County									
Johnson County									
Kearney County									
Keith County									
Keya Paha County									
Kimball County									
Knox County									
Lancaster County									
Lincoln County									
Logan County									
Loup County									
Madison County									
McPherson County									
Merrick County									
Morrill County									
Nance County									
Nance County									
Nemaha County									
Nuckolls County									
Otoe County									
Pawnee County									
Perkins County									
Phelps County									
Pierce County									
Platte County									
Polk County									
Red Willow County									
Richardson County									
Rock County									
Saline County									
Sarpy County									
Saunders County									
Scotts Bluff County									
Seward County									
Sheridan County									
Sioux County									
Stanton County									
Thayer County									
Stanton County									
Thurston County									
Valley County									
Washington County									
Wayne County									
Webster County									
Wheeler County									
York County									
Totals									

== See also ==
- 1916 Nebraska lieutenant gubernatorial election
