= Nebraska's 3rd congressional district =

U.S. House district for Nebraska

Coordinates: 42°N 100°W

- Interactive map of district boundaries since January 3, 2023
- Representative: Adrian Smith; R–Gering
- Distribution: 53.79% rural; 46.21% urban
- Population (2025): 653,259
- Median household income: $75,469
- Ethnicity: 81.4% White; 12.2% Hispanic; 2.7% Two or more races; 1.4% Native American; 1.3% Black; 0.7% Asian; 0.3% other
- Cook PVI: R+27

Nebraska's 3rd congressional district is a congressional district in the U.S. state of Nebraska that encompasses its western three-fourths; it is one of the largest non-at-large districts in the country, covering nearly 65,000 square miles (170,000 km^{2}), two time zones and 80 counties. It includes Grand Island, Kearney, Hastings, North Platte, Alliance, and Scottsbluff. Additionally, it encompasses the Sandhills region and a large majority of the Platte River. With a Cook Partisan Voting Index rating of R+27, it is by far the most Republican district in Nebraska, a state with an all-Republican delegation.

== Political history ==
Nebraska has had at least three congressional districts since 1883. The district's current configuration dates from 1963, when Nebraska lost a seat as a result of the 1960 United States census. At that time, most of the old 3rd and 4th districts were merged to form the new 3rd district. It is one of the most Republican districts in the nation, as Democrats have only come close to winning it three times as currently drawn, in 1974, 1990, and 2006, all years where the incumbent was not running for reelection.

Republican presidential and gubernatorial candidates routinely carry the district with margins of 40 percent or more, while Franklin D. Roosevelt in 1936 was the last Democratic presidential candidate to win a plurality within the current district boundaries. Excepting historically Democratic Saline County on the district's eastern boundary, Thurston County which only moved into the district in 2023, and Dakota County which has only been within the district since 2013, the last Democrat to carry any county within the district at a presidential level was Jimmy Carter in 1976. Although the Nebraska Legislature is elected on a nonpartisan basis, all but two members representing significant portions of the district are known to be Republicans. With a Cook Partisan Voting Index (CPVI) of R+29, it is the most Republican congressional district outside Appalachia. Because Nebraska awards an Electoral College vote from each district, it is the most Republican Electoral College constituency. It is currently held by Republican Adrian Smith, who was first elected in 2006.

== Recent election results from statewide races ==
Year	Office	Results
2008	President	McCain 65% - 31%
2012	President	Romney 72% - 28%
2016	President	Trump 74% - 21%
2018	Senate	Fischer 71% - 25%
2018	Governor	Ricketts 73% - 27%
2020	President	Trump 75% - 23%
2022	Governor	Pillen 75% - 20%
2024	President	Trump 76% - 22%
2024	Senate (Reg.)	Fischer 67% - 33%
2024	Senate (Spec.)	Ricketts 79% - 21%

== Composition ==
Nebraska's 3rd congressional district contains the entirety of the following counties, with the exception of Polk, which it shares with the 1st. Polk County communities within the 3rd district include the village of Polk and Stromsburg.

#	County	Seat	Population
1	Adams	Hastings	30,899
3	Antelope	Neligh	6,302
5	Arthur	Arthur	412
7	Banner	Harrisburg	674
9	Blaine	Brewster	431
11	Boone	Albion	5,310
13	Box Butte	Alliance	10,692
15	Boyd	Butte	1,725
17	Brown	Ainsworth	2,853
19	Buffalo	Kearney	50,697
21	Burt	Tekamah	6,727
27	Cedar	Hartington	8,262
29	Chase	Imperial	3,724
31	Cherry	Valentine	5,492
33	Cheyenne	Sidney	9,541
35	Clay	Clay Center	6,116
41	Custer	Broken Bow	10,581
43	Dakota	Dakota City	21,268
45	Dawes	Chadron	8,133
47	Dawson	Lexington	24,085
49	Deuel	Chappell	1,871
51	Dixon	Ponca	5,491
57	Dundy	Benkelman	1,561
59	Fillmore	Geneva	5,548
61	Franklin	Franklin	2,825
63	Frontier	Stockville	2,585
65	Furnas	Beaver City	4,556
67	Gage	Beatrice	21,634
69	Garden	Oshkosh	1,794
71	Garfield	Burwell	1,763
73	Gosper	Elwood	1,847
75	Grant	Hyannis	565
77	Greeley	Greeley Center	2,219
79	Hall	Grand Island	62,197
81	Hamilton	Aurora	9,537
83	Harlan	Alma	3,045
85	Hayes	Hayes Center	846
87	Hitchcock	Trenton	2,552
89	Holt	O'Neill	10,093
91	Hooker	Mullen	679
93	Howard	St. Paul	6,527
95	Jefferson	Fairbury	7,054
97	Johnson	Tecumseh	5,198
99	Kearney	Minden	6,770
101	Keith	Ogallala	8,113
103	Keya Paha	Springview	805
105	Kimball	Kimball	3,289
107	Knox	Center	8,298
111	Lincoln	North Platte	33,365
113	Logan	Stapleton	655
115	Loup	Taylor	592
117	McPherson	Tryon	383
121	Merrick	Central City	7,755
123	Morrill	Bridgeport	4,504
125	Nance	Fullerton	3,274
127	Nemaha	Auburn	7,076
129	Nuckolls	Nelson	4,095
131	Otoe	Nebraska City	16,335
133	Pawnee	Pawnee City	2,512
135	Perkins	Grant	2,795
137	Phelps	Holdrege	9,057
139	Pierce	Pierce	7,299
143	Polk (shared with the 1st)	Osceola	5,228
145	Red Willow	McCook	10,457
147	Richardson	Falls City	7,689
149	Rock	Bassett	1,271
151	Saline	Wilber	14,555
157	Scotts Bluff	Gering	35,699
161	Sheridan	Rushville	4,928
163	Sherman	Loup City	2,983
165	Sioux	Harrison	1,154
169	Thayer	Hebron	4,829
171	Thomas	Thedford	677
173	Thurston	Pender	6,557
175	Valley	Ord	4,012
177	Washington	Blair	21,152
179	Wayne	Wayne	9,874
181	Webster	Red Cloud	3,351
183	Wheeler	Barlett	775
185	York	York	14,356

=== Cites and CDPS with 10,000 or more people ===
- Grand Island – 52,622
- Kearney – 34,362
- Hastings – 24,896
- North Platte – 22,523
- Scottsbluff – 14,305
- South Sioux City – 13,856
- Beatrice – 12,262
- Lexington – 10,816

=== 2,500 – 10,000 people ===
- Gering – 8,531
- York – 8,180
- Alliance – 8,056
- Blair – 7,967
- Crete – 7,488
- Nebraska City – 7,414
- McCook – 7,253
- Sidney – 6,440
- Wayne – 6,165
- Holdrege – 5,542
- Chadron – 5,145
- Aurora – 4,704
- Ogallala – 4,680
- Falls City – 4,045
- Cozad – 3,933
- Fairbury – 3,832
- O'Neill – 3,575
- Broken Bow – 3,542
- Auburn – 3,507
- Gothenburg – 3,430
- Minden – 3,136
- Central City – 3,090
- Valentine – 2,631

== List of members representing the district ==
Member	Party	Years	Cong ress	Electoral history
District established March 4, 1883
Edward K. Valentine (West Point)	Republican	March 4, 1883 – March 3, 1885	48th	Redistricted from at-large district and re-elected in 1882. Retired.
George W. E. Dorsey (Fremont)	Republican	March 4, 1885 – March 3, 1891	49th 50th 51st	Elected in 1884. Re-elected in 1886. Re-elected in 1888. Lost re-election.
Omer M. Kem (Broken Bow)	Populist	March 4, 1891 – March 3, 1893	52nd	Elected in 1890. Redistricted to the 6th district.
George de Rue Meiklejohn (Fullerton)	Republican	March 4, 1893 – March 3, 1897	53rd 54th	Elected in 1892. Re-elected in 1894. Retired.
Samuel Maxwell (Fremont)	Populist	March 4, 1897 – March 3, 1899	55th	Elected in 1896. Retired.
John Seaton Robinson (Madison)	Democratic	March 4, 1899 – March 3, 1903	56th 57th	Elected in 1898. Re-elected in 1900. Lost re-election.
John J. McCarthy (Ponca)	Republican	March 4, 1903 – March 3, 1907	58th 59th	Elected in 1902. Re-elected in 1904. Lost renomination.
John Frank Boyd (Neligh)	Republican	March 4, 1907 – March 3, 1909	60th	Elected in 1906. Lost re-election.
James P. Latta (Tekamah)	Democratic	March 4, 1909 – September 11, 1911	61st 62nd	Elected in 1908. Re-elected in 1910. Died.
Vacant		September 11, 1911 – November 7, 1911	62nd	
Dan V. Stephens (Fremont)	Democratic	November 7, 1911 – March 3, 1919	62nd 63rd 64th 65th	Elected to finish Latta's term. Re-elected in 1912. Re-elected in 1914. Re-elected in 1916. Lost re-election.
Robert E. Evans (Dakota City)	Republican	March 4, 1919 – March 3, 1923	66th 67th	Elected in 1918. Re-elected in 1920. Lost re-election.
Edgar Howard (Columbus)	Democratic	March 4, 1923 – January 3, 1935	68th 69th 70th 71st 72nd 73rd	Elected in 1922. Re-elected in 1924. Re-elected in 1926. Re-elected in 1928. Re-elected in 1930. Re-elected in 1932. Lost re-election.
Karl Stefan (Norfolk)	Republican	January 3, 1935 – October 2, 1951	74th 75th 76th 77th 78th 79th 80th 81st 82nd	Elected in 1934. Re-elected in 1936. Re-elected in 1938. Re-elected in 1940. Re-elected in 1942. Re-elected in 1944. Re-elected in 1946. Re-elected in 1948. Re-elected in 1950. Died.
Vacant		October 2, 1951 – December 4, 1951	82nd	
R. D. Harrison (Norfolk)	Republican	December 4, 1951 – January 3, 1959	82nd 83rd 84th 85th	Elected to finish Stefan's term. Re-elected in 1952. Re-elected in 1954. Re-elected in 1956. Lost re-election.
Lawrence Brock (Wakefield)	Democratic	January 3, 1959 – January 3, 1961	86th	Elected in 1958. Lost re-election.
Ralph F. Beermann (Dakota City)	Republican	January 3, 1961 – January 3, 1963	87th	Elected in 1960. Redistricted to the 1st district.
David Martin (Kearney)	Republican	January 3, 1963 – December 31, 1974	88th 89th 90th 91st 92nd 93rd	Redistricted from the 4th district and re-elected in 1962. Re-elected in 1964. Re-elected in 1966. Re-elected in 1968. Re-elected in 1970. Re-elected in 1972. Retired and then resigned early.
Vacant		December 31, 1974 – January 3, 1975	93rd	
Virginia Smith (Chappell)	Republican	January 3, 1975 – January 3, 1991	94th 95th 96th 97th 98th 99th 100th 101st	Elected in 1974. Re-elected in 1976. Re-elected in 1978. Re-elected in 1980. Re-elected in 1982. Re-elected in 1984. Re-elected in 1986. Re-elected in 1988. Retired.
Bill Barrett (Lexington)	Republican	January 3, 1991 – January 3, 2001	102nd 103rd 104th 105th 106th	Elected in 1990. Re-elected in 1992. Re-elected in 1994. Re-elected in 1996. Re-elected in 1998. Retired.
Tom Osborne (Lemoyne)	Republican	January 3, 2001 – January 3, 2007	107th 108th 109th	Elected in 2000. Re-elected in 2002. Re-elected in 2004. Retired to run for Governor of Nebraska.
Adrian Smith (Gering)	Republican	January 3, 2007 – present	110th 111th 112th 113th 114th 115th 116th 117th 118th 119th	Elected in 2006. Re-elected in 2008. Re-elected in 2010. Re-elected in 2012. Re-elected in 2014. Re-elected in 2016. Re-elected in 2018. Re-elected in 2020. Re-elected in 2022. Re-elected in 2024. Re-elected in 2026.

== Election history ==
=== 2004 ===
General election, 2004
Party	Candidate	Votes	%
Republican	Tom Osborne (Incumbent)	218,751	87.5%
Democratic	Donna J. Anderson	26,434	10.5%
Nebraska	Joseph A. Rosberg	3,396	1.4%
Green	Roy Guisinger	1,555	.6%
Total votes		250,136	100.0%
Republican hold			

=== 2006 ===
General election, 2006
Party	Candidate	Votes	%
Republican	Adrian Smith	113,687	54.99%
Democratic	Scott Kleeb	93,046	45.01%
Total votes		206,733	100.0%
Republican hold			

=== 2008 ===
General election, 2008
Party	Candidate	Votes	%
Republican	Adrian Smith (Incumbent)	183,117	76.87%
Democratic	Jay C. Stoddard	55,087	23.13%
Total votes		238,204	100.0%
Republican hold			

=== 2010 ===
General election, 2010
Party	Candidate	Votes	%
Republican	Adrian Smith (Incumbent)	117,275	70.12%
Democratic	Rebekah Davis	29,932	17.9%
Independent	Dan Hill	20,036	11.98%
Total votes		167,243	100.0%
Republican hold			

=== 2012 ===
General election, 2012
Party	Candidate	Votes	%
Republican	Adrian Smith (Incumbent)	187,423	74.2%
Democratic	Mark Sullivan	65,266	25.8%
Total votes		252,689	100.0%
Republican hold			

=== 2014 ===
General election, 2014
Party	Candidate	Votes	%
Republican	Adrian Smith (Incumbent)	139,440	75.4%
Democratic	Mark Sullivan	45,524	24.6%
Total votes		184,964	100.0%
Republican hold			

=== 2016 ===
General election, 2016
Party	Candidate	Votes	%
Republican	Adrian Smith (Incumbent)	226,720	100%
Total votes		226,720	100.0%
Republican hold			

=== 2018 ===
General election, 2018
Party	Candidate	Votes	%
Republican	Adrian Smith (Incumbent)	163,650	76.7%
Democratic	Paul Theobald	49,654	23.3%
Total votes		213,304	100.0%
Republican hold			

=== 2020 ===
General election, 2020
Party	Candidate	Votes	%
Republican	Adrian Smith (Incumbent)	225,157	78.5%
Democratic	Mark Elworth Jr.	50,690	17.7%
Libertarian	Dustin C. Hobbs	10,923	3.8%
Total votes		286,770	100.0%
Republican hold			

=== 2022 ===
General election, 2022
Party	Candidate	Votes	%
Republican	Adrian Smith (incumbent)	172,700	78.30%
Democratic	David Else	34,836	15.79%
Legal Marijuana Now	Mark Elworth Jr.	13,016	5.90%
Total votes		220,552	100.00%
Republican hold			

=== 2024 ===
General election, 2024
Party	Candidate	Votes	%
Republican	Adrian Smith (incumbent)	243,481	80.42%
Democratic	Daniel Ebers	59,287	19.58%
Total votes		302,768	100.00%
Republican hold			

== Historical district boundaries ==
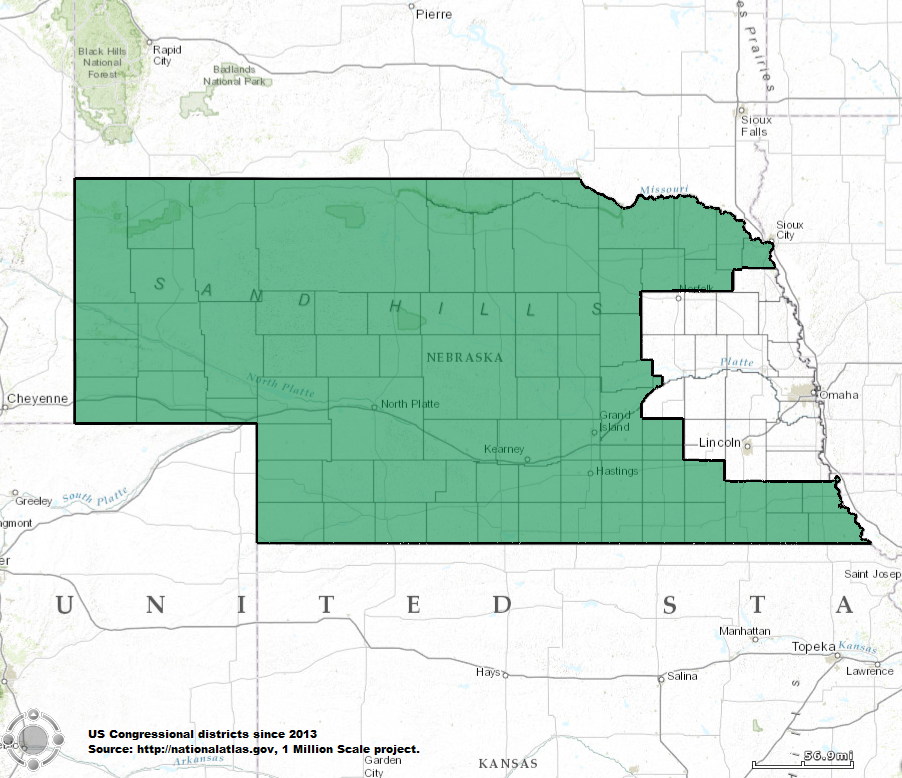
2013–2023

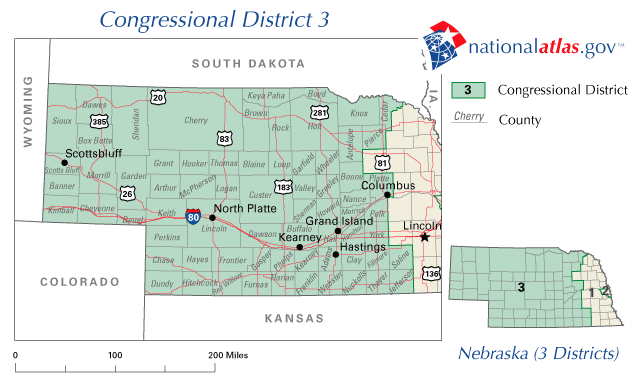
2003–2013

== See also ==
- Nebraska's congressional districts
- List of United States congressional districts
