= 1918 Nebraska gubernatorial election =

- November 5, 1918
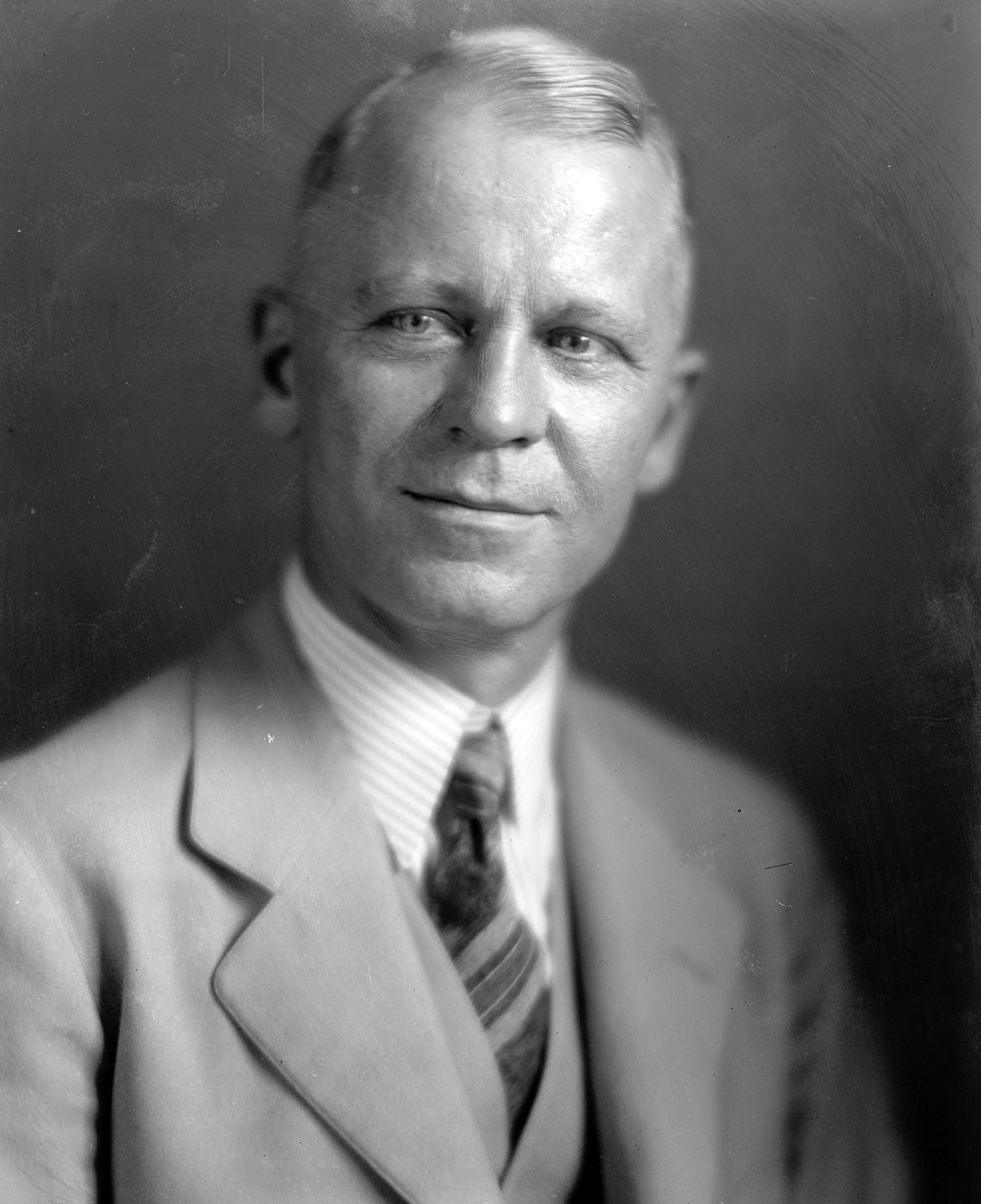

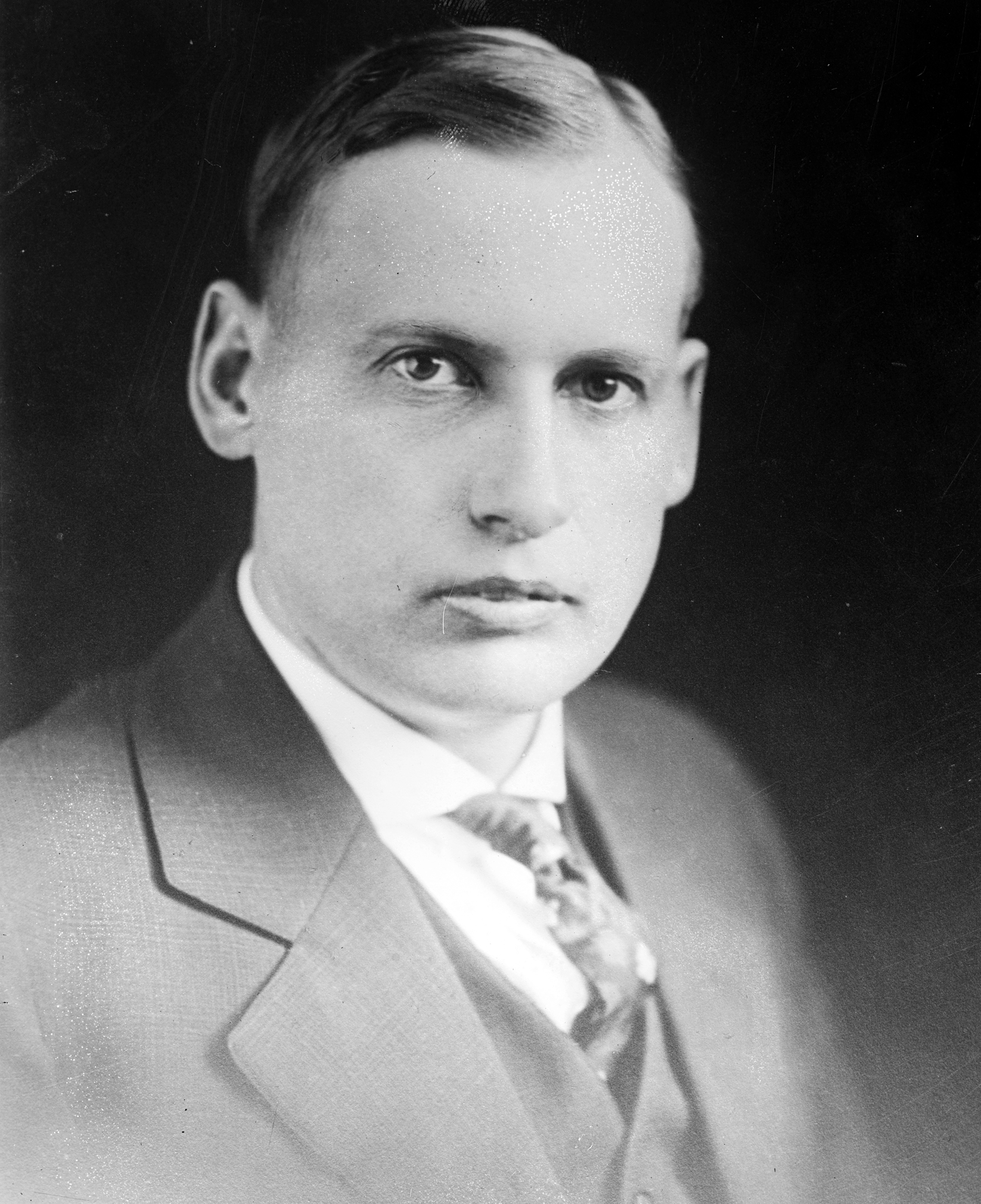
Nominee	Samuel R. McKelvie	Keith Neville
Party	Republican	Democratic
Popular vote	120,888	97,886
Percentage	54.41%	44.06%
- County results McKelvie: 40–50% 50–60% 60–70% 70–80% Neville: 40–50% 50–60% 60–70% 70–80%
Governor before election
Keith Neville
Democratic
Elected Governor
Samuel R. McKelvie
Republican

The 1918 Nebraska gubernatorial election was held on November 5, 1918, and featured former lieutenant governor Samuel R. McKelvie, a Republican, defeating incumbent Democratic governor, Keith Neville.

== Democratic primary ==
=== Candidates ===
- Charles W. Bryan, former Mayor of Lincoln
- Keith Neville, incumbent governor

=== Results ===
Democratic primary results
Party	Candidate	Votes	%
Democratic	Keith Neville	38,629	62.13
Democratic	Charles W. Bryan	23,548	37.87

== Prohibition primary ==
=== Candidates ===
- Charles W. Bryan, former Mayor of Lincoln
- Julian D. Graves, attorney from Peru, Nebraska

=== Results ===
Prohibition primary results
Party	Candidate	Votes	%
Prohibition	Julian D. Graves	172	93.99
Prohibition	Charles W. Bryan	11	6.01

== Republican primary ==
=== Candidates ===
- Walter Johnson
- Samuel R. McKelvie, former lieutenant governor

=== Results ===
Republican primary results
Party	Candidate	Votes	%
Republican	Samuel R. McKelvie	46,375	71.70
Republican	Walter Johnson	18,308	28.30

== General election ==
=== Results ===
Nebraska gubernatorial election, 1918
Party	Candidate	Votes	%
Republican	Samuel R. McKelvie	120,888	54.41%
Democratic	Keith Neville (incumbent)	97,886	44.06%
Prohibition	Julian D. Graves	3,409	1.53%
Total votes		222,183	100.0%
Republican gain from Democratic			

==== By County ====
By county

County	Person Democratic		Person Republican		Various candidates Other parties		Margin		Total votes
County	#	%	#	%	#	%	#	%	Total votes
Adams County									
Antelope County									
Arthur County									
Banner County									
Blaine County									
Boone County									
Box Butte County									
Boyd County									
Brown County									
Buffalo County									
Burt County									
Butler County									
Cass County									
Cedar County									
Chase County									
Cherry County									
Cheyenne County									
Clay County									
Colfax County									
Cuming County									
Custer County									
Dakota County									
Dawes County									
Dawson County									
Deuel County									
Dixon County									
Dodge County									
Douglas County									
Dundy County									
Fillmore County									
Franklin County									
Frontier County									
Furnas County									
Gage County									
Garden County									
Garfield County									
Gosper County									
Grant County									
Greeley County									
Hall County									
Hamilton County									
Hayes County									
Hitchcock County									
Holt County									
Hooker County									
Howard County									
Jefferson County									
Johnson County									
Kearney County									
Keith County									
Keya Paha County									
Kimball County									
Knox County									
Lancaster County									
Lincoln County									
Logan County									
Loup County									
Madison County									
McPherson County									
Merrick County									
Morrill County									
Nance County									
Nance County									
Nemaha County									
Nuckolls County									
Otoe County									
Pawnee County									
Perkins County									
Phelps County									
Pierce County									
Platte County									
Polk County									
Red Willow County									
Richardson County									
Rock County									
Saline County									
Sarpy County									
Saunders County									
Scotts Bluff County									
Seward County									
Sheridan County									
Sioux County									
Stanton County									
Thayer County									
Stanton County									
Thurston County									
Valley County									
Washington County									
Wayne County									
Webster County									
Wheeler County									
York County									
Totals									

== See also ==
- 1918 Nebraska lieutenant gubernatorial election
