= Samuel Roy McKelvie =

American politician

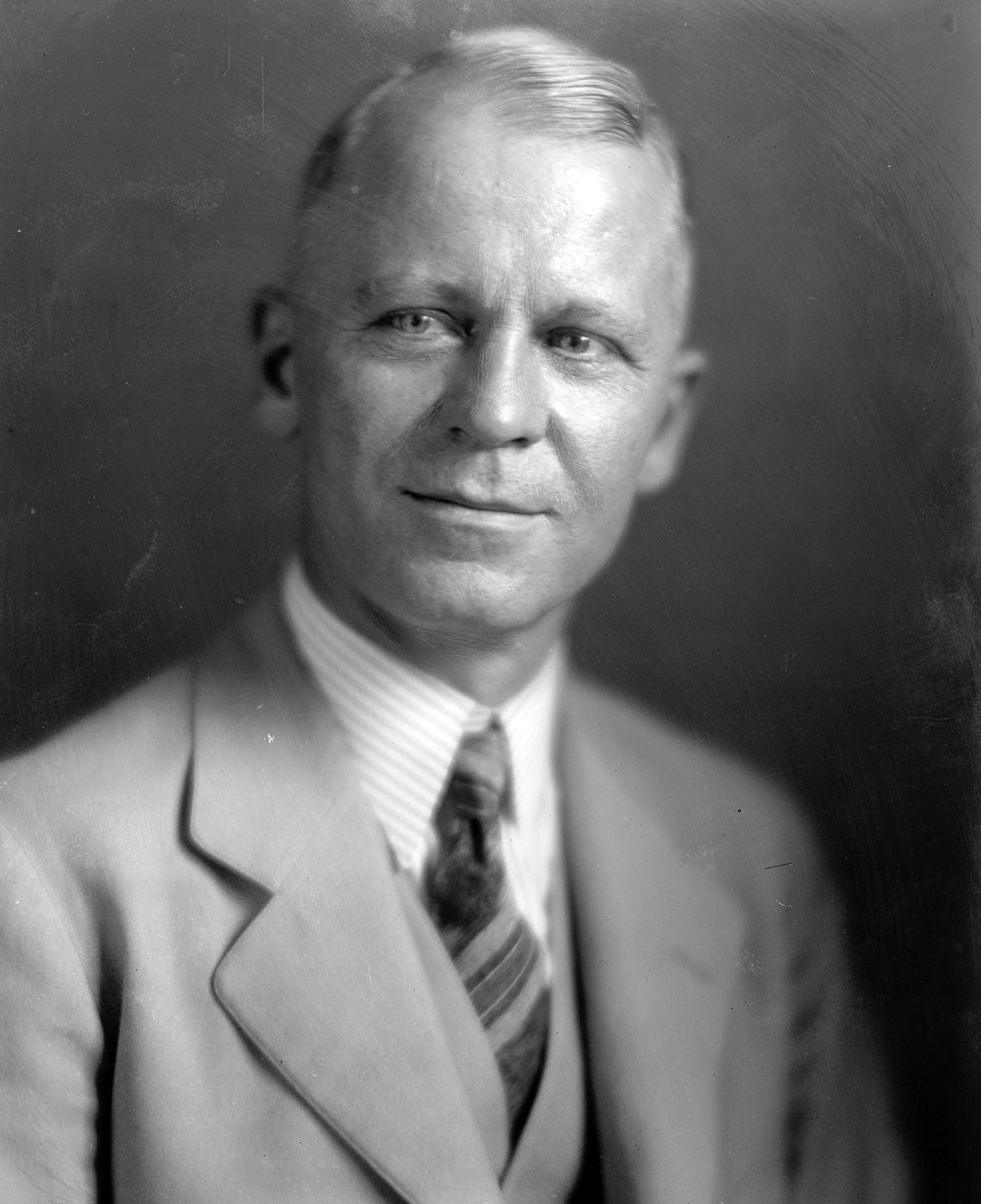

19th Governor of Nebraska
- In office January 9, 1919 – January 3, 1923
- Lieutenant: Pelham A. Barrows
- Preceded by: Keith Neville
- Succeeded by: Charles W. Bryan

13th Lieutenant Governor of Nebraska
- In office 1913–1915
- Governor: John H. Morehead
- Preceded by: John H. Morehead (acting); Melville R. Hopewell
- Succeeded by: James Pearson

Member of the Nebraska House of Representatives
- In office Elected 1910

Personal details
- Born: April 15, 1881 near Fairfield, Nebraska, US
- Died: January 6, 1956 (aged 74) Mesa, Arizona, US
- Resting place: Wyuka Cemetery
- Party: Republican
- Spouse: Martha Groves De Arnold (1886-1976)
- Children: 2
- Education: University of Nebraska; Lincoln Business College

Samuel Roy McKelvie (April 15, 1881 – January 6, 1956) was an American politician from the U.S. state of Nebraska. McKelvie served as the 19th governor of Nebraska, from 1919 to 1923. He was also the 13th lieutenant governor of Nebraska, from 1913 to 1915.

McKelvie was born near Fairfield, Nebraska. He attended the University of Nebraska and graduated from Lincoln Business College in 1901. He married Martha (Flossie) DeArnold on June 19, 1904, and the couple had two children. As Martha McKelvie, his spouse was a noted silent movie columnist, and, starting three years after his death, the author of what became a total of twenty-four books, one of them, Presidents, Politicians and People I Have Known, a memoir.

== Career ==
From 1902 to 1905, McKelvie sold advertising for the Twentieth Century Farmer of Omaha, Nebraska. The editor of Nebraska Farmer beginning in 1905, he became principal owner and publisher of that paper by 1908.

McKelvie first entered politics as a member of the Lincoln City Council. He held that position from 1908 to 1909. McKelvie was then elected to one term in the Nebraska House of Representatives in 1910, and served as the Lieutenant Governor of Nebraska from 1913 to 1915.

McKelvie was the Republican gubernatorial nominee in 1918, and defeated Democratic incumbent Keith Neville. Reelected in 1920, he saw a state park system initiated, construction plans for a new state capitol building approved, the state accounting system restructured, and forty-one new amendments to the state constitution sanctioned during his tenure. On April 15, 1922, a few months before leaving the governorship, McKelvie helped break ground for the current Nebraska State Capitol.

After stepping down from the governorship, McKelvie returned to his publishing position at Nebraska Farmer. He was a delegate to the Republican National Convention in 1936 and 1944.

== Death and legacy ==
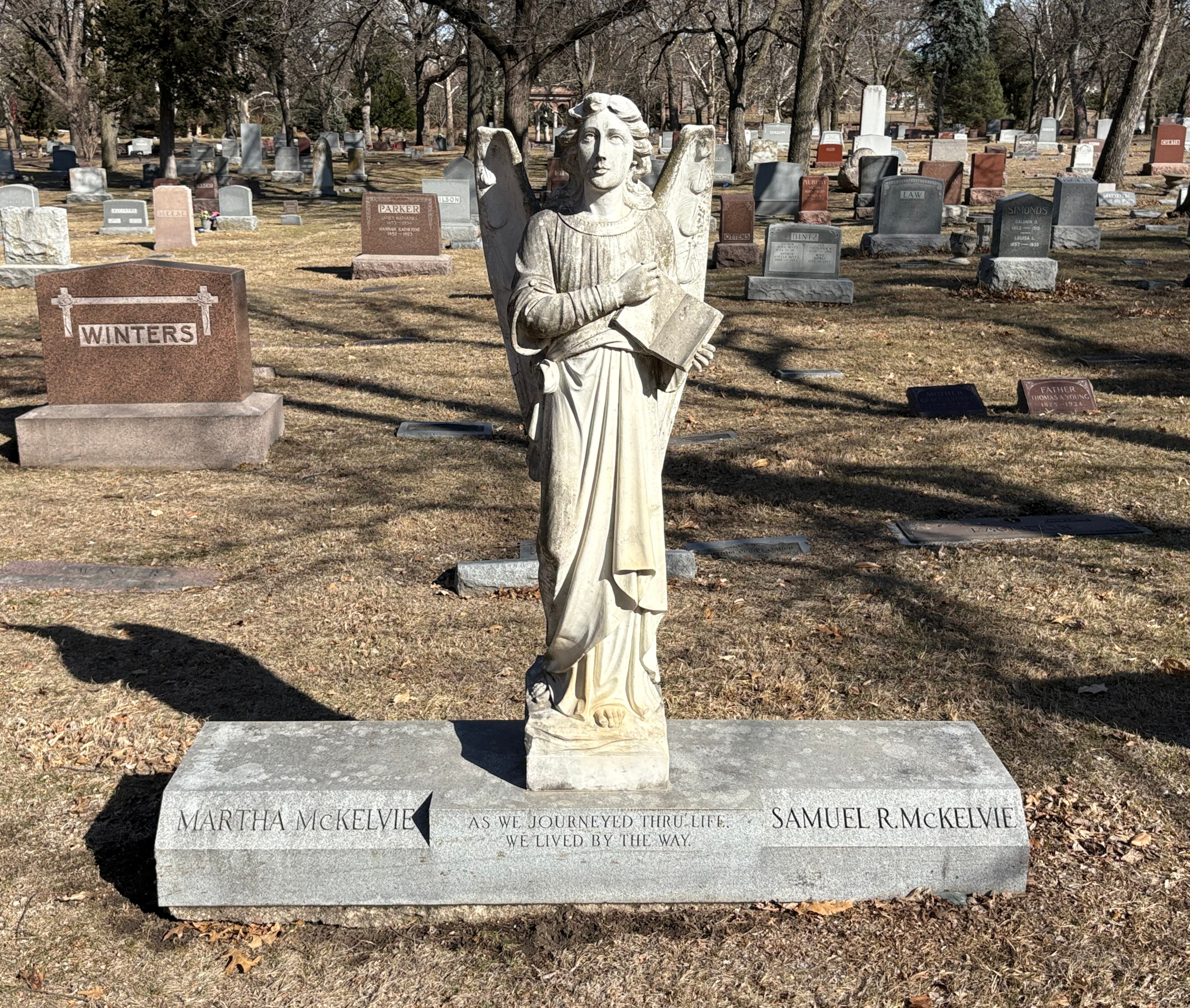
McKelvie's grave at Wyuka Cemetery

McKelvie died on January 6, 1956, at his winter home near Mesa, Arizona after suffering two heart attacks. He is interred at Wyuka Cemetery in Lincoln, Nebraska.

The Samuel R. McKelvie National Forest is named after him.

Party political offices
Preceded by Abraham L. Sutton	Republican nominee for Governor of Nebraska; 1918, 1920	Succeeded by Charles H. Randall
Political offices
Preceded by Melville R. Hopewell	Lieutenant Governor of Nebraska; 1913–1915	Succeeded by James Pearson
Preceded by Keith Neville	Governor of Nebraska; 1919–1923	Succeeded by Charles W. Bryan
