= Robert E. Evans =

American judge and politician (1856–1925)

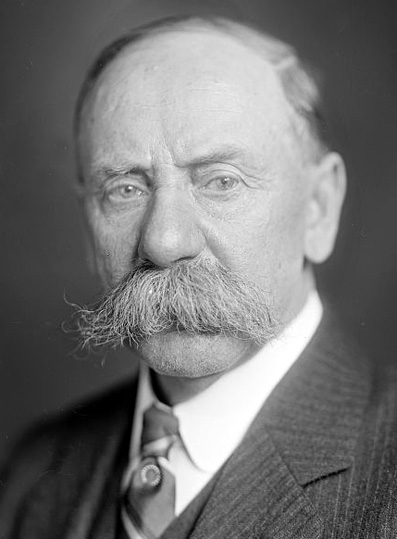

Member of the U.S. House of Representatives from Nebraska's 3rd district
- In office March 4, 1919 – March 3, 1923
- Preceded by: Dan V. Stephens
- Succeeded by: Edgar Howard

Personal details
- Born: July 15, 1856 Coalmont, Pennsylvania
- Died: July 8, 1925 (aged 68) Lincoln, Nebraska
- Party: Republican
- Education: Indiana Normal School; University of Michigan
- Occupation: machinist, lawyer

Robert Emory Evans (July 15, 1856 – July 8, 1925) was a Nebraska Republican politician.

Evans was born in Coalmont, Pennsylvania, in 1856. He attended the Pennsylvania Normal School at Millersville, Pennsylvania, and the Indiana Normal School. He worked as a machinist from 1877 to 1883. He graduated from the law department of the University of Michigan at Ann Arbor, Michigan, in 1886 and was admitted to the bar. He moved to Dakota City, Nebraska, in 1887. Due to his training as a machinist and in the normal schools, he became superintendent of the Winnebago Industrial School from 1889 to 1891.

In 1895, he became the prosecuting attorney of Dakota County, Nebraska. He soon resigned that post to become the judge of the Nebraska Eighth Judicial District and served from 1895 to 1899. He was a delegate to the 1912 Republican National Convention and became the president of the Nebraska State Bar Association in 1919.

He defeated incumbent Dan V. Stephens to represent the 3rd Congressional District of Nebraska in the Sixty-sixth Congress. He was re-elected for a second term to the Sixty-seventh Congress. He served from March 4, 1919, to March 3, 1923. He lost to Edgar Howard in 1922. He resumed his law practice in Dakota City. He was elected Judge of the Supreme Court from the Third District of Nebraska in 1924. He served until his death on July 8, 1925. He died in Lincoln, Nebraska where he had previously moved to serve on the Supreme Court. He is buried in Graceland Park Cemetery in Sioux City, Iowa.

U.S. House of Representatives
Preceded by Dan V. Stephens (D)	Member of the U.S. House of Representatives from Nebraska's 3rd congressional district March 4, 1919 – March 3, 1923	Succeeded by Edgar Howard (D)
Political offices
Preceded by Charles B. Letton	Justice of the Nebraska Supreme Court; 1925–1925	Succeeded by George A. Eberly
