= 1992 United States House of Representatives elections in Nebraska =

- November 3, 1992

All 3 Nebraska seats to the United States House of Representatives
	Majority party	Minority party
Party	Republican	Democratic
Last election	2	1
Seats won	2	1
Seat change	Steady	Steady
Popular vote	427,398	283,278
Percentage	60.13%	39.85%

The 1992 United States House of Representatives elections in Nebraska were held on November 3, 1992, to elect the state of Nebraska's three members to the United States House of Representatives.

== Overview ==
1992 United States House of Representatives elections in Nebraska
Party	Votes	Percentage	Seats	+/–
Republican	427,398	60.13%	2	Steady
Democratic	283,278	39.85%	1	Steady
Write-ins	159	0.02%	0	—
Totals	710,835	100.00%	3	—

== District 1 ==
Incumbent Republican Congressman Doug Bereuter ran for re-election to another term. He was challenged by Democratic nominee Gerry Finnegan, an investment adviser and political strategist. Bereuter defeated Finnegan by a wide margin, receiving 60 percent of the vote to Finnegan's 40 percent.

=== Republican primary ===
==== Candidates ====
- Doug Bereuter, incumbent U.S. Representative

==== Results ====
Republican primary results
Party	Candidate	Votes	%
Republican	Doug Bereuter (inc.)	58,005	98.51%
Republican	Write-ins	875	1.49%
Total votes		58,880	100.00%

=== Democratic primary ===
==== Candidates ====
- Gerry Finnegan, investment adviser, political strategist
- Ken L. Michaelis, disbarred attorney, perennial candidate
- Marlin Pals, perennial candidate

==== Results ====
Democratic primary results
Party	Candidate	Votes	%
Democratic	Gerry Finnegan	20,366	46.50%
Democratic	Ken L. Michaelis	16,726	38.19%
Democratic	Marlin Pals	6,310	14.41%
Democratic	Write-ins	393	0.90%
Total votes		43,795	100.00%

=== General election ===
==== Candidates ====
- Doug Bereuter (Republican)
- Gerry Finnegan (Democratic)

==== Results ====
1992 Nebraska's 1st congressional district general election results
Party	Candidate	Votes	%
Republican	Doug Bereuter (inc.)	142,713	59.69%
Democratic	Gerry Finnegan	96,309	40.28%
Write-ins		86	0.04%
Total votes		239,108	100.00%
Republican hold			

== District 2 ==
Incumbent Democratic Congressman Peter Hoagland ran for re-election to a third term. He was challenged by former Douglas County Attorney Ronald Staskiewicz, the Republican nominee. Hoagland narrowly defeated Staskiewicz to win re-election, receiving 51 percent of the vote to Staskiewicz's 49 percent.

=== Republican primary ===
==== Candidates ====
- Ronald L. Staskiewicz, former Douglas County Attorney

==== Results ====
Republican primary results
Party	Candidate	Votes	%
Republican	Ronald Staskiewicz	58,005	98.51%
Republican	Write-ins	875	1.49%
Total votes		58,880	100.00%

=== Democratic primary ===
==== Candidates ====
- Peter Hoagland, incumbent U.S. Representative
- Jess M. Pritchett, perennial candidate

==== Results ====
Democratic primary results
Party	Candidate	Votes	%
Democratic	Peter Hoagland (inc.)	42,825	84.68%
Democratic	Jess M. Pritchett	7,501	14.83%
Democratic	Write-ins	246	0.49%
Total votes		50,572	100.00%

=== General election ===
==== Candidates ====
- Peter Hoagland (Democratic)
- Ronald Staskiewicz (Republican)

==== Results ====
1992 Nebraska's 2nd congressional district general election results
Party	Candidate	Votes	%
Democratic	Peter Hoagland (inc.)	119,512	51.21%
Republican	Ronald Staskiewicz	113,828	48.78%
Write-ins		32	0.01%
Total votes		233,372	100.00%
Democratic hold			

== District 3 ==
Incumbent Republican Congressman Bill Barrett ran for re-election to a second term. He was challenged by rancher Lowell Fisher, the Democratic nominee. In contrast to Barrett's narrow win in 1990, he won re-election in a landslide, receiving 72 percent of the vote to Fisher's 28 percent.

=== Republican primary ===
==== Candidates ====
- Bill Barrett, incumbent U.S. Representative

==== Results ====
Republican primary results
Party	Candidate	Votes	%
Republican	Bill Barrett (inc.)	75,526	99.70%
Republican	Write-ins	229	0.30%
Total votes		75,755	100.00%

=== Democratic primary ===
==== Candidates ====
- Lowell Fisher, rancher

==== Results ====
Democratic primary results
Party	Candidate	Votes	%
Democratic	Lowell Fisher	36,626	99.32%
Democratic	Write-ins	249	0.68%
Total votes		36,875	100.00%

=== General election ===
==== Candidates ====
- Bill Barrett (Republican)
- Lowell Fisher (Democratic)

==== Results ====
1992 Nebraska's 3rd congressional district general election results
Party	Candidate	Votes	%
Republican	Bill Barrett (inc.)	170,857	71.68%
Democratic	Lowell Fisher	67,457	28.30%
Write-ins		41	0.02%
Total votes		238,355	100.00%
Republican hold			

== See also ==
- 1992 United States House of Representatives elections
