= Keith Neville =

American politician (1884–1959)

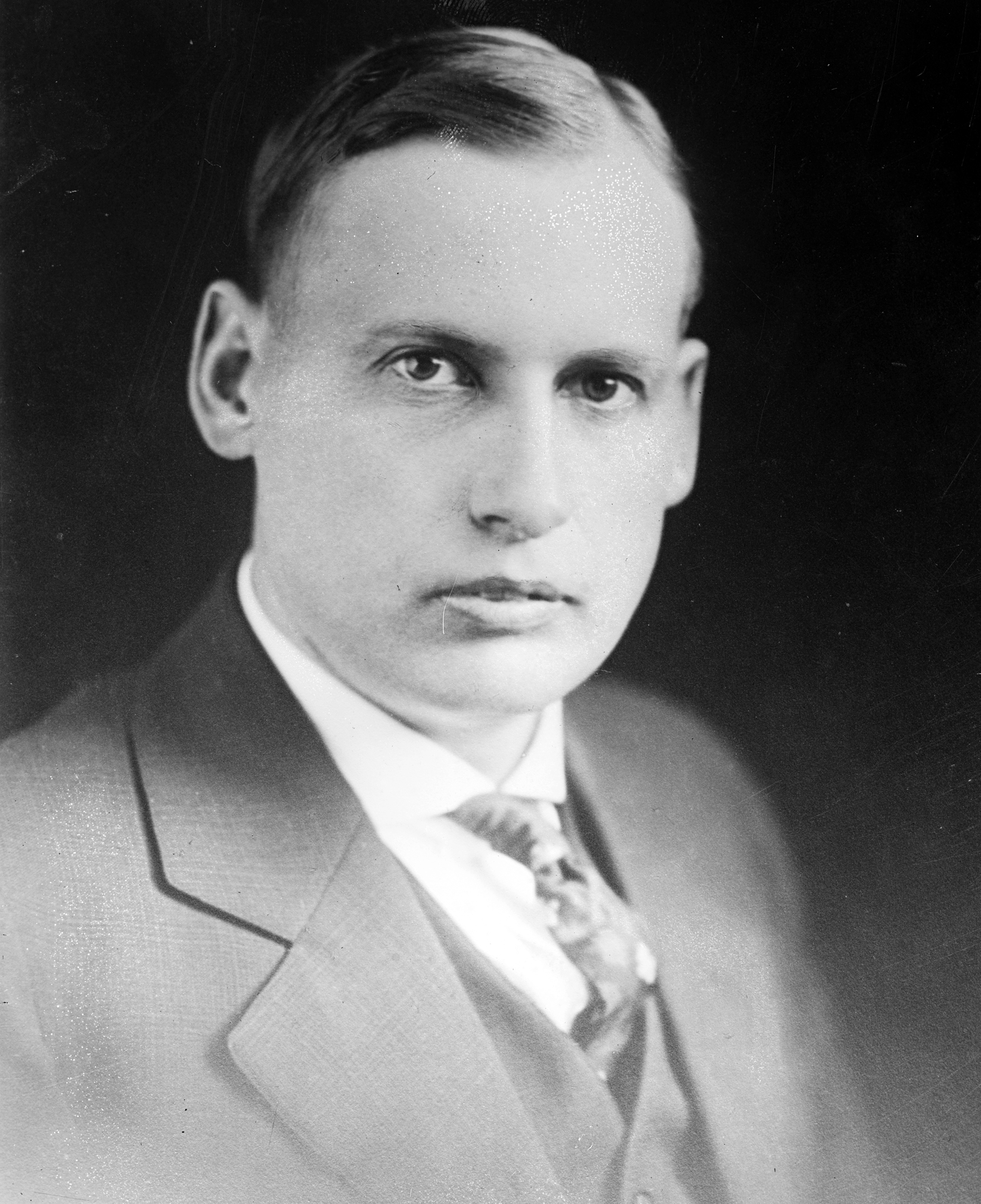

18th Governor of Nebraska
- In office January 4, 1917 – January 9, 1919
- Lieutenant: Edgar Howard
- Preceded by: John H. Morehead
- Succeeded by: Samuel R. McKelvie

Personal details
- Born: February 25, 1884 North Platte, Nebraska
- Died: December 4, 1959 (aged 75) North Platte, Nebraska
- Party: Democratic
- Spouse: Mary Virginia Neill
- Children: 4
- Profession: Banker

Morell Keith Neville (February 25, 1884 – December 4, 1959) was an American politician from the U.S. state of Nebraska. A member of the Democratic Party, he served as the 18th governor of Nebraska.

Neville was born in North Platte, Nebraska, the son of William Neville, and attended St. John's Academy. In 1905, he graduated from St. John's College (Annapolis/Santa Fe) in Annapolis, Maryland, where he was a member of Phi Sigma Kappa fraternity. He returned to manage the family ranch and served as the director of the First National Bank in North Platte. He married Mary Virginia Neill on October 21, 1908, and they had four children.

== Career ==
Nicknamed the "Boy Governor" for his youth, 32 years of age, Neville was elected in 1916 as governor of Nebraska, serving from 1917 to 1919. During his tenure a rigorous liquor law was sanctioned and World War I issues were dealt with.

In 1918 Neville was defeated for re-election as governor by Republican Samuel R. McKelvie and returned to North Platte, where he continued to be active in banking and ranching as well as politics. He was a delegate to the Democratic National Convention from Nebraska in 1920, 1932 and 1956. He was the Democratic nominee for U.S. Senator from Nebraska in 1954, but lost to Republican Congressman Carl Curtis. For seventeen years, Neville also was coach of the North Platte High School football team.

== Death and legacy ==
Neville died December 4, 1959, and is interred at North Platte Cemetery in North Platte. He was a member of the Freemasons, the Elks, the Moose, the Odd Fellows, and Phi Sigma Kappa, as well as a member of the Episcopal Church.

The Nebraska State Historical Society holds papers relating to Neville's administration.

== See also ==
- Politics of the United States

Party political offices
| Preceded by John H. Morehead | Democratic nominee for Governor of Nebraska; 1916, 1918 | Succeeded by John H. Morehead |
| Preceded by William H. Meier | Democratic nominee for U.S. Senator (Class 2) from Nebraska; 1954 | Succeeded by Ralph G. Brooks |
Political offices
| Preceded by John H. Morehead | Governor of Nebraska; 1917–1919 | Succeeded by Samuel R. McKelvie |
