= 1996 United States House of Representatives elections in Nebraska =

- November 5, 1996

All 3 Nebraska seats to the United States House of Representatives
	Majority party	Minority party
Party	Republican	Democratic
Last election	3	0
Seats won	3	0
Seat change	Steady	Steady
Popular vote	450,067	204,432
Percentage	68.02%	30.90%

The 1996 United States House of Representatives elections in Nebraska were held on November 5, 1996, to elect the state of Nebraska's three members to the United States House of Representatives.

== Overview ==
1996 United States House of Representatives elections in Nebraska
Party	Votes	Percentage	Seats	+/–
Republican	450,067	68.02%	3	Steady
Democratic	204,432	30.90%	0	Steady
Natural Law	4,369	0.66%	0	—
Libertarian	1,921	0.29%	0	—
Write-ins	855	0.13%	0	—
Totals	661,644	100.00%	3	—

== District 1 ==
Incumbent Republican Congressman Doug Bereuter ran for re-election to a tenth term. He was challenged by Lincoln radio talk show host Patrick Combs, the Democratic nominee, and won re-election in a landslide, receiving 70 percent of the vote to Combs's 30 percent.

=== Republican primary ===
==== Candidates ====
- Doug Bereuter, incumbent U.S. Representative

==== Results ====
Republican primary results
Party	Candidate	Votes	%
Republican	Doug Bereuter (inc.)	52,914	99.03%
Republican	Write-ins	516	0.97%
Total votes		53,430	100.00%

=== Democratic primary ===
==== Candidates ====
- Patrick J. Combs, radio talk show host
- Marlin Pals, perennial candidate

==== Results ====
Democratic primary results
Party	Candidate	Votes	%
Democratic	Patrick J. Combs	24,725	82.25%
Democratic	Marlin Pals	5,145	17.11%
Democratic	Write-ins	192	0.64%
Total votes		30,062	100.00%

=== General election ===
==== Candidates ====
- Doug Bereuter (Republican)
- Patrick J. Combs (Democratic)

==== Results ====
1996 Nebraska's 1st congressional district general election results
Party	Candidate	Votes	%
Republican	Doug Bereuter (inc.)	157,108	69.96%
Democratic	Patrick J. Combs	67,152	29.90%
Write-ins		303	0.13%
Total votes		224,563	100.00%
Republican hold			

== District 2 ==
Incumbent Republican Congressman Jon Christensen ran for re-election to a second term. He was challenged by attorney James Martin Davis, the Democratic nominee. Christiansen defeated Davis by a wide margin, receiving 57 percent of the vote to Davis's 40 percent.

=== Republican primary ===
==== Candidates ====
- Jon Christensen, incumbent U.S. Representative

==== Results ====
Republican primary results
Party	Candidate	Votes	%
Republican	Jon Christensen (inc.)	43,396	96.33%
Republican	Write-ins	1,652	3.67%
Total votes		45,048	100.00%

=== Democratic primary ===
==== Candidates ====
- James Martin Davis, attorney
- Jess M. Pritchett, perennial candidate

==== Results ====
Democratic primary results
Party	Candidate	Votes	%
Democratic	James Martin Davis	25,223	78.41%
Democratic	Jess M. Pritchett	6,637	20.63%
Democratic	Write-ins	307	0.95%
Total votes		32,167	100.00%

=== Libertarian primary ===
==== Candidates ====
- Phillip E. Torrison

==== Results ====
Libertarian primary results
Party	Candidate	Votes	%
Libertarian	Phillip E. Torrison	60	92.31%
Libertarian	Write-ins	5	7.69%
Total votes		65	100.00%

=== General election ===
==== Candidates ====
- Jon Christensen (Republican)
- James Martin Davis (Democratic)
- Patricia A. Dunn (Natural Law)
- Phillip E. Torrison (Libertarian)

==== Results ====
1996 Nebraska's 2nd congressional district general election results
Party	Candidate	Votes	%
Republican	Jon Christensen (inc.)	125,201	56.83%
Democratic	James Martin Davis	88,447	40.14%
Natural Law	Patricia A. Dunn	4,369	1.98%
Libertarian	Phillip E. Torrison	1,921	0.87%
Write-ins		386	0.18%
Total votes		220,324	100.00%
Republican hold			

== District 3 ==
Incumbent Republican Congressman Bill Barrett ran for re-election to fourth term. No candidates filed to run against him, and Barrett received the nominations of the Democratic Party and Libertarian Party by write-in votes, but declined both nominations. The Democratic Party subsequently named farmer John Webster as its nominee. Barrett defeated Webster in a landslide, receiving 77 percent of the vote to Webster's 23 percent.

=== Republican primary ===
==== Candidates ====
- Bill Barrett, incumbent U.S. Representative

==== Results ====
Republican primary results
Party	Candidate	Votes	%
Republican	Bill Barrett (inc.)	65,874	99.64%
Republican	Write-ins	237	0.36%
Total votes		66,111	100.00%

=== General election ===
==== Candidates ====
- Bill Barrett (Republican)
- John Webster (Democratic)

==== Results ====
1996 Nebraska's 3rd congressional district general election results
Party	Candidate	Votes	%
Republican	Bill Barrett (inc.)	167,758	77.39%
Democratic	John Webster	48,833	22.53%
Write-ins		166	0.08%
Total votes		216,757	100.00%
Republican hold			

== See also ==
- 1996 United States House of Representatives elections
