= George de Rue Meiklejohn =

American politician (1857–1929)

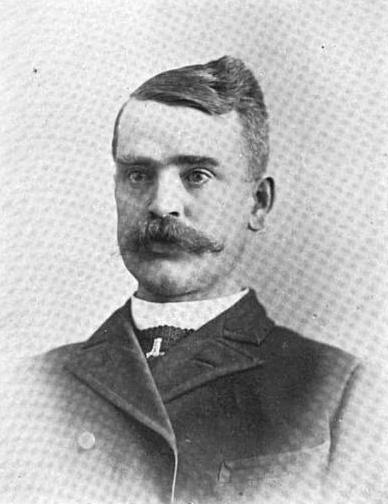

United States Assistant Secretary of War
- In office 1897–1901
- President: William McKinley
- Preceded by: Joseph Doe
- Succeeded by: William Cary Sanger

Member of the U.S. House of Representatives from Nebraska's 3rd district
- In office March 4, 1893 – March 3, 1897
- Preceded by: Omer Madison Kem
- Succeeded by: Samuel Maxwell

5th Lieutenant Governor of Nebraska
- In office 1889–1891
- Governor: John Milton Thayer
- Preceded by: Hibbard H. Shedd
- Succeeded by: Thomas Jefferson Majors

14th President pro tempore of the Nebraska Senate
- In office January 1887 – January 1889
- Preceded by: Church Howe
- Succeeded by: Church Howe

Personal details
- Born: August 26, 1857 Weyauwega, Wisconsin
- Died: April 19, 1929 (aged 71) Los Angeles, California
- Party: Republican
- Education: University of Wisconsin–Oshkosh; University of Michigan Law School
- Occupation: lawyer

George de Rue Meiklejohn (/ˈmiːkəlˌdʒɒn/; August 26, 1857 – April 19, 1929) was an American politician who served as the fifth lieutenant governor of Nebraska under Governor John Milton Thayer and as a member of the United States House of Representatives for Nebraska. He was the United States Assistant Secretary of War from 1897 to 1901.

== Early life and education ==
de Rue Meiklejohn was born in Weyauwega, Wisconsin, on August 26, 1857. He went to the state normal school in Oshkosh, Wisconsin (now University of Wisconsin–Oshkosh).

== Career ==
He became a principal of high schools in Weyauwega and Liscomb, Iowa. After graduating from the University of Michigan Law School in Ann Arbor, Michigan, in 1880, he was admitted to the bar and established a practice in Fullerton, Nebraska. He was the prosecuting attorney for Nance County, Nebraska, from 1881 to 1884.

In 1884 Meiklejohn was elected a member of the Nebraska Legislature, serving from 1884 to 1888. In 1886, he became president of the Senate, in 1887 the chairman of the Republican State convention, and in 1887 and 1888 chairman of the Republican State central committee. In 1889 he became the Lieutenant Governor of Nebraska and served until 1891. He was elected as a Republican to the 53rd and 54th Congresses (March 4, 1893 – March 3, 1897), but did not run for re-election in 1896. On April 14, 1897, U.S. President William McKinley appointed him the Assistant Secretary of War and he served through the Spanish–American War until March 1901.

Meiklejohn ran unsuccessfully for election to the United States Senate from Nebraska in 1901 to fill the seat of Monroe Hayward. After that, he resumed his law practice in Omaha, Nebraska, moving to Los Angeles, California, in 1918, where he practiced law and mining.

== Personal life ==
He died in poverty at the Los Angeles County General Hospital in Los Angeles, California, on April 19, 1929. He was buried in Forest Lawn Cemetery in Glendale, California.

Political offices
Preceded by Hibbard H. Shedd	Lieutenant Governor of Nebraska; 1889 – 1891	Succeeded by Thomas Jefferson Majors
U.S. House of Representatives
Preceded by Omer Madison Kem	Member of the U.S. House of Representatives from Nebraska's 3rd congressional district March 4, 1893 – March 3, 1897	Succeeded by Samuel Maxwell
