= Charles B. Letton =

American judge (c. 1854 – 1932)

Charles B. Letton (c. 1854 – May 1, 1932) was an American justice of the Nebraska Supreme Court from 1906 to 1925.

Letton's family emigrated to the US from Scotland in 1869 and became homesteaders in Jefferson County, Nebraska. Letton attended the local schools and read law in the office of Slocumb & Hambel, gaining admission to the bar in Jefferson County in 1881. He served as a county prosecutor for four yearsm, from 1885 to 1889, and as a district judge for eight years, for a district covering six counties in southwestern Nebraska. He was elected as a Republican to the state supreme court in November 1905, defeating Democrat William G. Hastings by a substantial majority.

He was twice reelected to the supreme court, serving for 19 years, announcing his retirement at the end of 1924, effective January 8, 1925. From 1927 until his death, he served as state librarian and clerk of the supreme court.

Letton died of a heart attack in Lincoln, Nebraska, at the age of 78.

Political offices
Preceded by Silas A. Holcomb	Justice of the Nebraska Supreme Court; 1906–1925	Succeeded by Robert E. Evans
