= Nebraska Farmer =

American agricultural publication

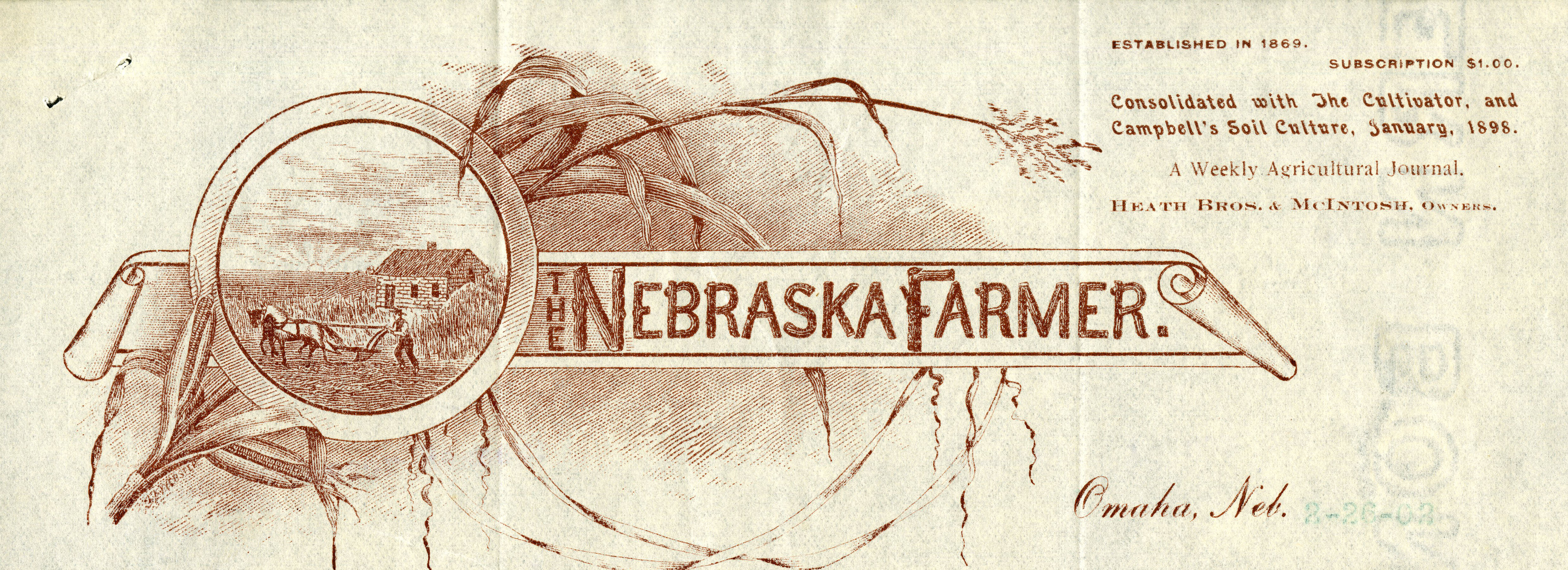
- Categories: Trade newspaper
- Frequency: Monthly
- Founder: Robert Wilkinson Furnas
- Founded: 1859
- Company: Farm Progress
- Country: United States
- Based in: Lincoln, Nebraska
- Language: English
- Website: nebraskafarmer.com
- ISSN: 1049-1880

The Nebraska Farmer was the first agricultural publication in the state and is, at present, one of the oldest run journals in Nebraska. This publication is still highly influential in the making of agricultural policies and procedures in Nebraska and surrounding Great Plains states. It is owned by media company Penton.

== History ==
Founded in 1859 by Robert Wilkinson Furnas the journal was published eight years before the territory of Nebraska would become a state and wrote for "the experiences of those who have been cultivating our own soil". Over the years since its publication the Nebraska Farmer has always been dedicated to serving the diverse geographic regions of the state. Being an assistance to farmers that plant a wide variety of crops and a leading ranching and cattle region in the county.

Robert Furnas worked as the editor for the paper, which was published as monthly, until 1862 when he was called to fight in the American Civil War. With movement ownership and uncertainty of state affairs Nebraska Farmer was discontinued on and off and did not regain the stability of its early years for a few decades. The paper was first reissued as a weekly paper with Abraham Deyo as the editor in 1872. The paper stayed afloat for two years, was closed in 1874, and was then reopened once again in January 1877 by J. C. McBride. This iteration of the paper had a lot of difficulties and in 1898 moved to Omaha and was consolidated into The Cultivator.

A paper under the title of Nebraska Farmer would not be published again in the state until in 1905 Samuel Roy McKelvie was offered the position to revive the editorship. The publication plant was moved back to Lincoln, Nebraska and McKelvie began a successful expansion of paper. By focusing on issues like irrigation, unburdening taxes on farmers, or crop rotation the Farmer focused on agriculture and the states politics. Other agricultural journals were consolidated into the Farmer, such as the Twentieth Century Farmer in 1918 and the Nebraska Farm Journal in 1928. McKelvie remained Nebraska Farmer publisher until his death in 1956. The company continued to expand, launching Colorado Rancher and Farmer in 1947 (now part of the Western Farmer-Stockman) and creating the Husker Harvest Days farm show near Grand Island, Nebraska, in 1978.

In the late 1960s, Nebraska Farmer was purchased by Harcourt, Brace & World. In 1991, Farm Progress Companies purchased it and other Harcourt Brace farm publications. Farm Progress was purchased by Penton in 2012.
