= John McCarthy (Nebraska politician) =

American politician (1857–1943)

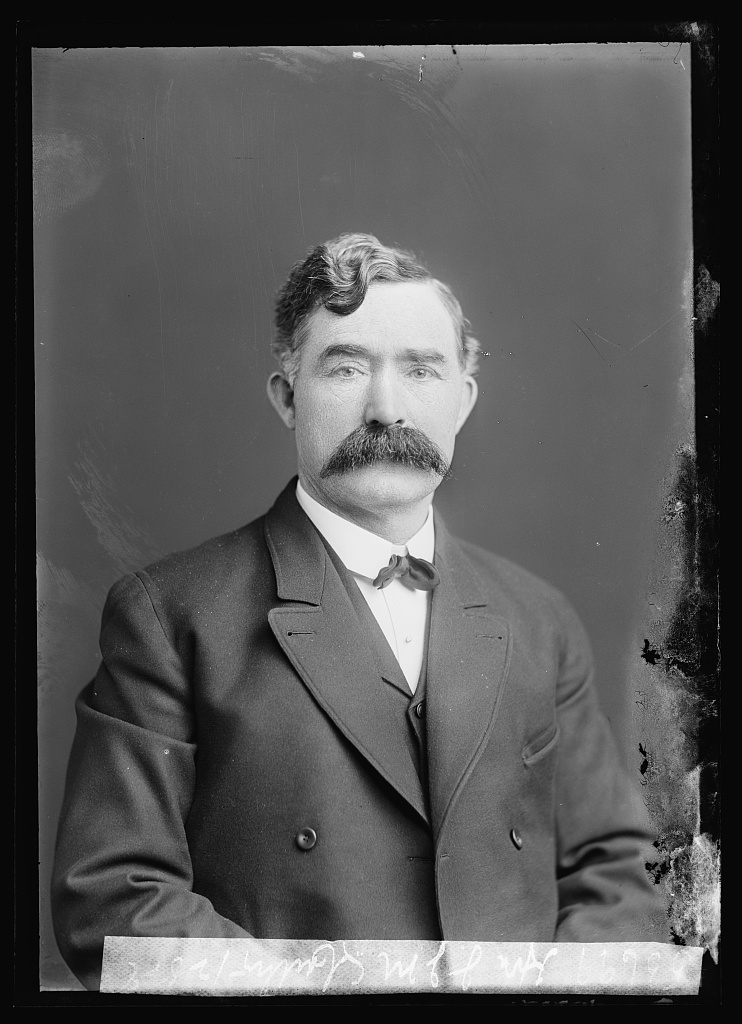
- John Jay McCarthy photographed by C. M. Bell Studio]

Member of the U.S. House of Representatives from Nebraska's 3rd district
- In office March 4, 1903 – March 3, 1907
- Preceded by: John Seaton Robinson
- Succeeded by: John Frank Boyd

Personal details
- Born: July 19, 1857 Stoughton, Wisconsin
- Died: March 30, 1943 (aged 85) Ponca, Nebraska
- Party: Republican
- Occupation: lawyer

John Jay McCarthy (July 19, 1857 – March 30, 1943) was a Nebraska Republican politician.

Born in Stoughton, Wisconsin, on July 19, 1857, he attended Albion Academy. He moved to David City, Nebraska, in 1879 and to Dixon County, Nebraska, in 1882. He married Ellen "Nellie" McGowen (1862–1920) in 1883. He was admitted to the bar in 1884 and set up practice in Emerson, Nebraska.

He was elected prosecuting attorney of Dixon County in 1890, 1892, and 1894. In 1898 and 1900, he was elected as a member of the Nebraska House of Representatives. In 1902, he was elected as a Republican to the Fifty-eighth and Fifty-ninth Congresses and served Nebraska's 3rd district from 1904 to 1908. He ran in the 1906 primary and lost to John Frank Boyd. He continued with his law practice in Ponca, Nebraska, not serving in any other elected office, though he was a delegate to the 1912 Republican National Convention. He died in Ponca on March 30, 1943, and is buried in Ponca Cemetery.

U.S. House of Representatives
Preceded by John Seaton Robinson (D)	Member of the U.S. House of Representatives from Nebraska's 3rd congressional district March 4, 1903 – March 3, 1907	Succeeded by John Frank Boyd (R)
