= John Seaton Robinson =

American politician

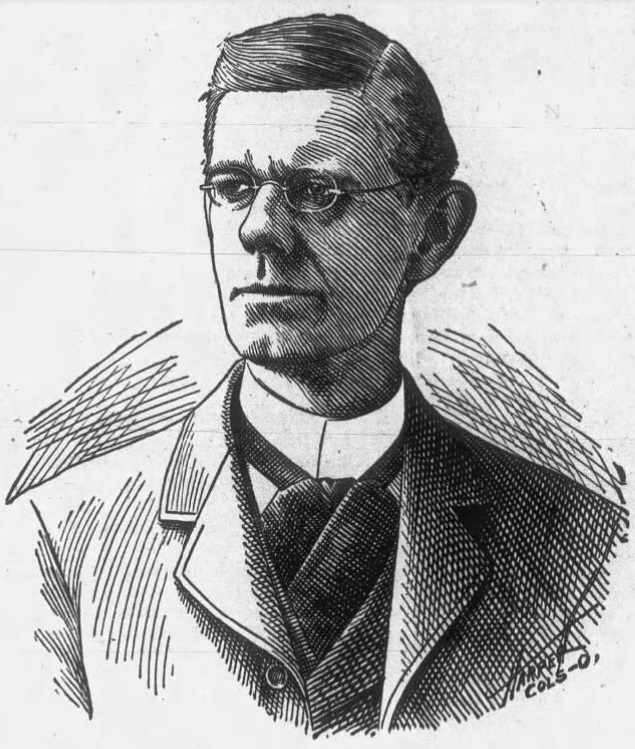
- The Madison Star (Madison, Nebraska), July 18, 1902

Member of the U.S. House of Representatives from Nebraska's 3rd district
- In office March 4, 1899 – March 3, 1903
- Preceded by: Samuel Maxwell
- Succeeded by: John McCarthy

Judge of Nebraska's Ninth District Court
- In office 1893–1899
- Preceded by: William V. Allen
- Succeeded by: William V. Allen

Personal details
- Born: John Seaton Robinson; May 4, 1856 Wheeling Virginia, U.S.
- Died: May 25, 1903 (aged 47) Madison, Nebraska, U.S.
- Resting place: Crownhill Cemetery, Madison, Nebraska, U.S.
- Party: Democratic
- Spouse: Kate C. Bohannon (m. 1890)
- Children: 2
- Profession: Attorney

John Seaton Robinson (May 4, 1856 – May 25, 1903) was an attorney, judge, and politician from Nebraska. A Democrat, he was most notable for his service in the United States House of Representatives from 1899 to 1903.

== Early life ==
Robinson was born in Wheeling, Virginia (later West Virginia), on May 4, 1856, the youngest of 13 children born to Irish immigrants Robert Robinson and Sarah (Aken) Robinson. Robinson attended school until age 12, when he began work in a glass factory. He returned to school a year later, and after graduating, worked at a variety of occupations, including retail store clerk, apprentice plumber, and manufacturer in a hinge factory.

After four years at the hinge factory, and several well-received speeches to the local literary society, in 1879 Robinson accepted the advice of his friends and began to study law with Wheeling attorney John O. Pendleton. He attained admission to the bar in May 1880 and practiced in Wheeling until 1884, when he decided to relocate to the western United States. After traveling to Clinton, Iowa to confer with childhood friend Thomas F. Memminger, Robinson and Memminger decided to settle in Nebraska, and Robinson chose to establish a law practice in Madison.

== Continued career ==
In Madison, Robinson practiced in partnership with William V. Allen from 1885 to 1891, when Allen became a judge of the Nebraska district court. While practicing law, Robinson also served as county attorney of Madison County.

In 1892, Robinson formed a partnership with attorneys W. E. Reed and M. B. Foster; they practiced together until July 1893, when Foster retired. Robinson and Reed practiced together until November 1893, when Allen was elected to the United States Senate and Robinson succeeded him as judge. Robinson served as judge of Nebraska's ninth district court until winning election to Congress.

== U.S. Congressman ==
In 1898, Robinson was the successful nominee of the Democratic and People's parties for Nebraska's 3rd congressional district seat in the United States House of Representatives. He was reelected in 1900 and served in the 55th and 56th Congresses (March 4, 1899 – March 3, 1903). He was an unsuccessful candidate for reelection in 1902, and resumed the practice of law.

Robinson died in Madison on May 25, 1903. He was buried at Crownhill Cemetery in Madison.

== Family ==
In 1890, Robinson married Kate C. Bohannon of Madison. They were the parents of two children, Adeline and John Jr.

U.S. House of Representatives
Preceded by Samuel Maxwell (P)	Member of the U.S. House of Representatives from Nebraska's 3rd congressional district March 4, 1899 – March 3, 1903	Succeeded by John McCarthy (R)
