= Samuel Maxwell =

American judge (1825–1901)

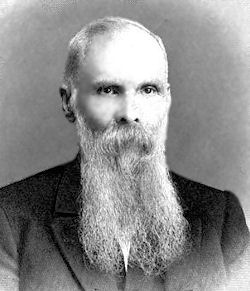
- From Volume 2 of 1899's Autobiographies and Portraits of the President, Cabinet, Supreme Court, and Fifty-Fifth Congress

Member of the U.S. House of Representatives from Nebraska's 3rd district
- In office March 4, 1897 – March 3, 1899
- Preceded by: George de Rue Meiklejohn
- Succeeded by: John Seaton Robinson

Personal details
- Born: May 20, 1825 Lodi, New York
- Died: February 11, 1901 (aged 75) Fremont, Nebraska
- Party: Populist
- Occupation: lawyer

Samuel Maxwell (May 20, 1825 – February 11, 1901) was a Populist politician in the U.S. state of Nebraska.

Born in Lodi, New York, on May 20, 1825, he moved with his parents to Michigan in 1844. He taught school, farmed, and studied law. He moved to the Nebraska Territory settling in Cass County, Nebraska, resumed farming. He returned to Michigan to complete his law studies and passed the bar in 1859. He returned to Nebraska the same year and set up practice in Plattsmouth, Nebraska.

He became interested in Nebraskan Territorial politics. He was a delegate to the first Republican Territorial convention. He was a representative to the 1859, 1860, 1864, and 1865 Territorial house of representatives. He was a delegate to the Territorial constitutional conventions in 1864 and 1866 when Nebraska wrote its state's constitution. He was a member to the first Nebraska house of representatives in 1866. In 1867, David Butler appointed Maxwell to the board of commissioners to select capitol building plans and university lands. He was elected as an associate justice of the State supreme court in 1872, a job he was reelected to in 1875, 1881 and 1887. From 1878 to 1882, again from 1886 to 1888 and again from 1892 to 1894, he was the chief justice of the court. He was a delegate to the State constitutional convention in 1875. He was elected as a Populist to the Fifty-fifth Congress (March 4, 1897 – March 3, 1899). He resumed his law practice in Fremont, Nebraska, where he died on February 11, 1901. He is buried in Pleasant Hill Cemetery, Plattsmouth.

U.S. House of Representatives
Preceded by George de Rue Meiklejohn (R)	Member of the U.S. House of Representatives from Nebraska's 3rd congressional district March 4, 1897 – March 3, 1899	Succeeded by John Seaton Robinson (D)
