= John Frank Boyd =

American politician (1853–1945)

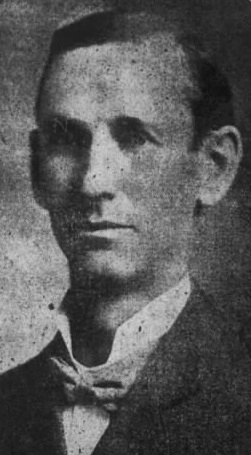
- The Plainview News (Plainview, Nebraska), October 18, 1906

Member of the U.S. House of Representatives from Nebraska's 3rd district
- In office March 4, 1907 – March 3, 1909
- Preceded by: John Jay McCarthy
- Succeeded by: James P. Latta

Personal details
- Born: August 8, 1853 Connellsville, Pennsylvania
- Died: May 28, 1945 (aged 91) Los Angeles, California
- Party: Republican
- Education: Abingdon College

John Frank Boyd (August 8, 1853 – May 28, 1945) was a Nebraska Republican politician.

Born in Connellsville, Pennsylvania, on August 8, 1853, he moved with his parents to Henry County, Illinois, in 1857. There he attended public schools and Abingdon College (which was later consolidated with Eureka College) where he studied law and was admitted to the bar in 1878. He first set up practice in Galva, Illinois, and then in 1883 Oakdale, Nebraska. He became prosecuting attorney of Antelope County, Nebraska, in 1888 and served until 1894. He moved to Neligh, Nebraska, in 1901.

In 1900 he became judge of the Ninth Judicial District Court of Nebraska and served until 1907 when he was elected as a Republican to the Sixtieth Congress (March 4, 1907 – March 3, 1909) representing the third district. He lost to James P. Latta in the 1908 election, and resumed his practice of law in Neligh. He retired and moved to Los Angeles, California, in 1929. He died there on May 28, 1945, and is buried in Forest Lawn Cemetery, in Glendale, California.

U.S. House of Representatives
Preceded by John J. McCarthy (R)	Member of the U.S. House of Representatives from Nebraska's 3rd congressional district March 4, 1907 – March 3, 1909	Succeeded by James P. Latta (D)
