= Bob Wickersham =

American politician

Member of the Nebraska Legislature from the 49th district
- In office January 9, 1991 – April 30, 2002
- Preceded by: Sandra K. Scofield
- Succeeded by: Fred Hlava

Personal details
- Born: October 22, 1948 (age 77) Lusk, Wyoming, U.S.
- Party: Democratic
- Spouse: Sandra K. Scofield (m. 1995)
- Education: Creighton University (B.S., B.A.); University of Nebraska College of Law (J.D.)
- Occupation: Attorney

Bob Wickersham (born October 22, 1948) is a Democratic politician and attorney from Nebraska who served as a member of the Nebraska Legislature from the 49th district from 1991 to 2002, and as a member of the Nebraska Tax Equalization and Review Commission from 2002 to 2011.

== Early life ==
Wickersham was born in Lusk, Wyoming, on October 22, 1948. He graduated from Sioux County High School in Harrison, Nebraska, in 1966, and later attended Creighton University and the University of Nebraska School of Law. Wickersham joined the law firm of Mumby and Skavdahl in Harrison in 1977, which eventually became Skavdahl and Wickersham. When Skavdahl was appointed Sioux County Attorney, Wickersham worked as deputy county attorney, and also lobbied the legislature on behalf of groundwater interests.

== Nebraska Legislature ==
In 1991, after State Senator Sandra K. Scofield was appointed as chief of staff to Governor Ben Nelson, Nelson appointed Wickersham as her successor in the 49th district, which was based in Box Butte, Dawes, Sherida, and Sioux counties in northwestern Nebraska. Wickersham was sworn in on January 9, 1991. Wickersham ran for a full term in 1992, He was challenged by Alliance Mayor Eva Knight and James Hanson, the former director of the Nebraska State Historical Society. Wickersham placed first in the primary, winning 48 percent of the vote to Knight's 33 percent. Wickersham and Knight advanced to the general election, where Wickersham won by a wide margin, receiving 57 percent of the vote to Knight's 43 percent.

Wickersham ran for re-election in 1996, and was challenged by rancher Cash Ostrander. In the primary election, Wickersham placed first over Ostrander, winning 66 percent of the vote to his 34 percent. Wickersham only narrowly defeated Ostrander in the general election, winning his second full term, 54–46 percent.

In 2000, Wickersham ran for a third term, and was challenged by Dana Cooley. who later dropped out of the race, but whose name remained on the ballot. Wickersham won 82 percent of the vote in the primary election, and 80 percent of the vote in the general election.

== Nebraska Tax Equalization and Review Commission ==
In 2002, after the state legislature added a fourth seat to the Nebraska Tax Equalization and Review Commission, Wickersham was appointed by Governor Mike Johanns to the newly created seat. He resigned from the legislature on April 30, 2002. The legislature unanimously confirmed Wickersham to the commission on August 6, 2002.

Wickersham was reappointed to a six-year term on the commission in 2006 by Governor Dave Heineman. However, in 2011, following "clash[es]" with the Heineman administration, the state legislature reduced the number of members on the commission from four to three, terminated the terms of the existing commissioners, and allowed Heineman to fill the vacancies. Two of the four commissioners were reappointed to their seats, but Wickersham was not, and left office on July 1, 2011.
