= Dan V. Stephens =

American politician (1868–1939)

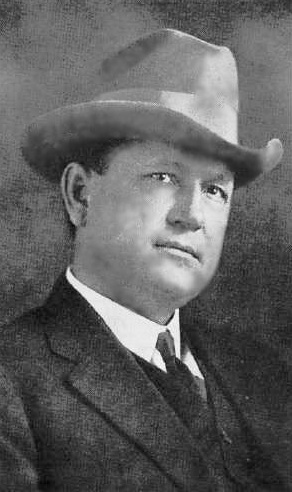
- Norfolk News Journal (Norfolk, NE), November 7, 1916

Member of the U.S. House of Representatives from Nebraska's 3rd district
- In office November 7, 1911 – March 3, 1919
- Preceded by: James P. Latta
- Succeeded by: Robert E. Evans

Personal details
- Born: November 4, 1868 Bloomington, Indiana
- Died: January 13, 1939 (aged 70) Fremont, Nebraska
- Party: Democratic
- Education: Valparaiso College
- Occupation: author, educator, lawyer

Dan Voorhees Stephens (November 4, 1868 – January 13, 1939) was a Nebraska Democratic politician.

Born in Bloomington, Indiana, on November 4, 1868, Dan V. Stephens attended Valparaiso College in Indiana. He settled in Fremont, Nebraska, where he taught school and studied law. He became the superintendent of schools in Dodge County, Nebraska, from 1890 to 1894. Stephens also authored several books, including Silas Cobb, Phelps and His Teacher and Passing of the Buffalo. He farmed, published, and worked in manufacturing and banking during this time.

Stephens served as a delegate to the Democratic National Convention in 1904, 1908, 1920, 1924, and 1932. When James P. Latta died in office, a special election was held and Stephens was elected to fill his seat in the Sixty-second Congress. He was reelected to the Sixty-third, Sixty-fourth, and Sixty-fifth Congresses serving from November 7, 1911, to March 3, 1919. He was an unsuccessful candidate for reelection in 1918. Stephens resumed his former business pursuits in Nebraska. He went on to become a member of the State board of education of Nebraska from 1923 to 1926. Stephens also served as president of the Stephens National Bank; president of the Stephens-Hammond Company; and vice-president of the Nebraska State Building and Loan Association. He died in Fremont, Nebraska, on January 13, 1939, and his remains were cremated.

U.S. House of Representatives
Preceded by James P. Latta (D)	Member of the U.S. House of Representatives from Nebraska's 3rd congressional district November 7, 1911 – March 3, 1919	Succeeded by Robert E. Evans (R)
