= James P. Latta =

American politician (1844–1911)

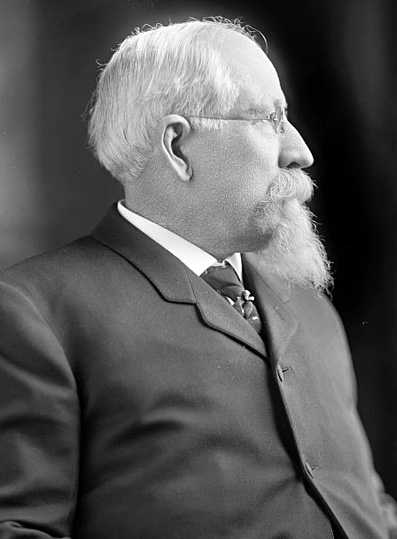
- 1905 Harris & Ewing portrait of Latta

Member of the U.S. House of Representatives from Nebraska's 3rd district
- In office March 4, 1909 – September 11, 1911
- Preceded by: John Frank Boyd
- Succeeded by: Dan V. Stephens

Member of the Nebraska Senate
- In office 1907

Member of the Nebraska House of Representatives
- In office 1887

Personal details
- Born: James Polk Latta; October 31, 1844 Ashland, Ohio, US
- Died: September 11, 1911 (aged 66) Rochester, Minnesota, US
- Party: Democratic
- Occupation: Politician

James Polk Latta (October 31, 1844 – September 11, 1911) was an American politician. A Democrat, he was a member of the United States House of Representatives from Nebraska.

== Biography ==
Latta was born on October 31, 1844, near Ashland, Ohio. He was presumably named for James K. Polk. In 1846, he and his parents moved to Jackson County, Iowa, where he worked on a farm and was educated at the public schools. In 1863, he moved to the Nebraska Territory, working as an educator in Tekamah. Beginning in 1887, he worked as a banker, founding the First National Bank of Tekamah in 1890, which he was president of until his death. He also farmed in Burt County.

Latta was a Democrat. In 1887, he was a member of the Nebraska House of Representatives, and in 1907, was a member of the Nebraska Senate. He was a member of the United States House of Representatives, from March 4, 1909, until his death in 1911, representing Nebraska's 3rd district. Ideologically, he leaned liberal.

Latta died on September 11, 1911, aged 66, in Rochester, Minnesota, and was buried at Tekamah Cemetery.

== See also ==
- List of members of the United States Congress who died in office (1900–1949)

U.S. House of Representatives
Preceded by John Frank Boyd	Member of the U.S. House of Representatives from Nebraska's 3rd congressional district March 4, 1909 – September 11, 1911	Succeeded by Dan V. Stephens
