= Edgar Howard =

American politician (1858–1951)

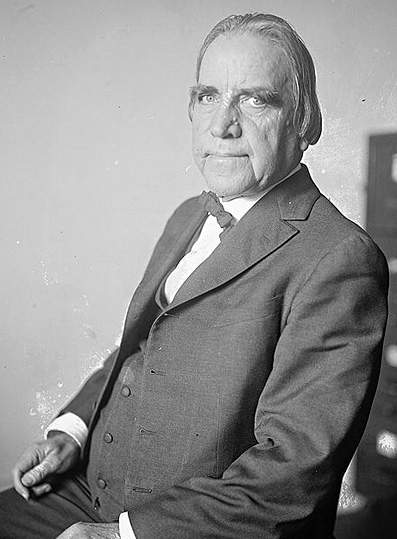

Member of the U.S. House of Representatives from Nebraska's 3rd district
- In office March 4, 1923 – January 3, 1935
- Preceded by: Robert E. Evans
- Succeeded by: Karl Stefan

15th Lieutenant Governor of Nebraska
- In office 1917–1919
- Governor: Keith Neville
- Preceded by: James Pearson
- Succeeded by: Pelham A. Barrows

Member of the Nebraska House of Representatives
- In office 1894-1896

Personal details
- Born: September 16, 1858 Osceola, Iowa
- Died: July 19, 1951 (aged 92) Columbus, Nebraska
- Party: Democratic
- Education: Western Collegiate Institute, Iowa College of Law
- Occupation: newspaper editor

Edgar Howard (September 16, 1858 – July 19, 1951) was a Nebraska editor and Democratic politician. He was the 15th lieutenant governor of Nebraska and served six terms in the United States House of Representatives.

== Early life and education ==
Edgar Howard was born in Osceola, Iowa, on September 16, 1858. He attended the Western Collegiate Institute and Iowa College of Law. He worked as a reporter and editor for various newspapers until 1884, when he got a job as an editor for the Papillion Times in Papillion, Nebraska. After serving a term in the state house, he passed the state bar and set up a law practice in 1896 in Papillion.

== Political career ==
Howard became involved in politics. He was elected to the Nebraska House of Representatives in 1894, serving to 1896. That year he was elected as probate judge of Sarpy County, Nebraska. Also that year he was a delegate to the 1896 Democratic National Convention.

In 1900 Howard ended his term as judge and purchased the weekly Telegram in Columbus, Nebraska. He published it for decades, expanding it in 1922 as a daily paper.

In 1917 Howard was elected as Nebraska's Lieutenant Governor, serving until 1919. He was elected as a Democrat to the Sixty-eighth United States Congress and to the five succeeding Congresses, serving from March 4, 1923, to January 3, 1935. During the Seventy-second United States Congress and Seventy-third United States Congress, he chaired the U.S. House Committee on Indian Affairs and was a co-sponsor of the Indian Reorganization Act, among other legislation. He was very concerned to end and even ameliorate what he described as "the staggering losses of Indian lands", and supported ending the allotment of communal lands.

Howard lost his bid for re-election in 1934 to Karl Stefan. He ran again for his former seat in 1938 and lost to Stefan. Howard returned each time to running the Columbus Daily Telegram. He died in Columbus on July 19, 1951, and is buried in the Columbus Cemetery.

Personal Life

Howard married Elizabeth Burtch in 1884. They had four children, Findley, Mary, Martha and Helen. Martha died in the early 1900s and Howard wrote a poem, “A Christmas Vision”, in memory of her. Edgar Howard

== Sources ==
1. "Howard, Edgar". The Political Graveyard.
2. "Howard, Edgar". Biographical Directory of the United States Congress.
3. Edgar Howard

Political offices
Preceded by James Pearson	Lieutenant Governor of Nebraska; 1917 – 1919	Succeeded by Pelham A. Barrows
U.S. House of Representatives
Preceded by Robert E. Evans (R)	Member of the U.S. House of Representatives from Nebraska's 3rd congressional district March 4, 1923 – January 3, 1935	Succeeded by Karl Stefan (R)
