= James Pearson (Nebraska politician) =

American politician (1873–1950)

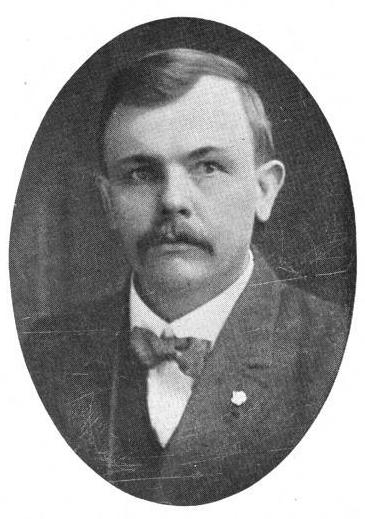

14th Lieutenant Governor of Nebraska
- In office January 1915 – January 1917
- Governor: John H. Morehead
- Preceded by: Samuel Roy McKelvie
- Succeeded by: Edgar Howard

Personal details
- Born: August 19, 1873 Pana, Illinois
- Died: April 16, 1950 (aged 76) Shenandoah, Iowa
- Spouse(s): Emma L. Clouse (1st wife)date of death 1918; Nancy Robbins Albin (divorced); Ellen
- Children: Luella "Dollie" Pearson (Ledbetter/Zeigenbein), James Arthur; Willard Earl; Daisy Pearson (died at age 6); Margaret Ann Pearson

James Pearson (August 19, 1873 – April 16, 1950) served as lieutenant governor for the United States state of Nebraska from 1915 to 1917, and later went on to a successful career as a "radio pastor."

Pearson was born in Pana, Illinois in 1873 and moved to Cass County, Nebraska in 1885. He later moved west to Moorefield. He became a grain buyer, and served as a representative (66th district) in the Nebraska legislature from 1913 to 1915. In 1914 he was the Democratic party nominee for lieutenant governor, and served in that position from 1915 to 1917.

Sometime after leaving office, he moved to Shenandoah, Iowa and became a popular radio preacher at KFNF, also nicknamed as the "newsboy" of the station.

In 1932, he was nominated in jest as the candidate for U.S. vice president by the Nebraska Democratic delegation. He died at Shenandoah, Iowa in 1950. He had been ill for a year after suffering a stroke.

Political offices
Preceded by Samuel Roy McKelvie	Lieutenant Governor of Nebraska; 1915–1917	Succeeded by Edgar Howard
