= Virginia Smith (politician) =

American politician (1911–2006)

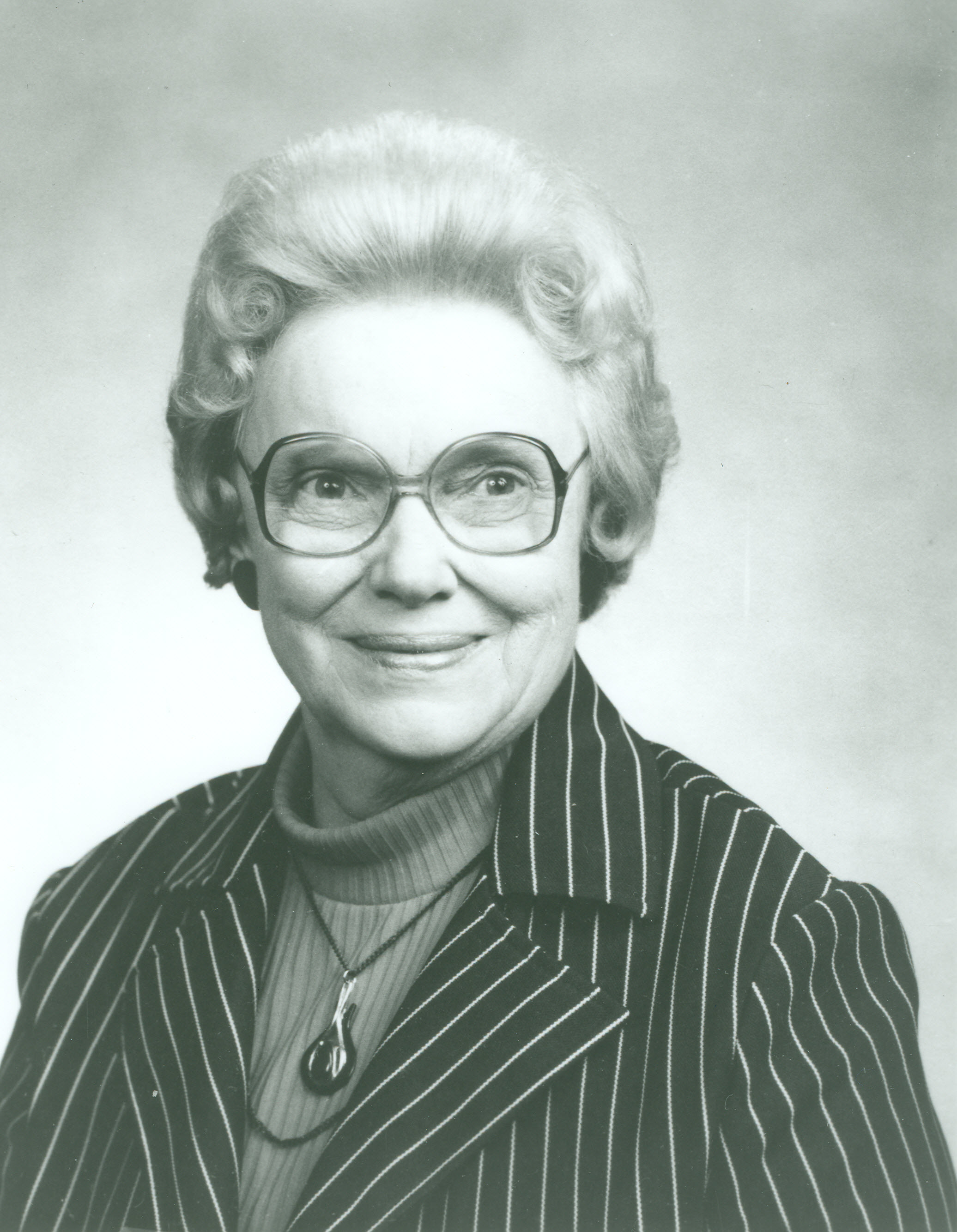

Member of the U.S. House of Representatives from Nebraska's 3rd district
- In office January 3, 1975 – January 3, 1991
- Preceded by: David Martin
- Succeeded by: Bill Barrett

Personal details
- Born: Virginia Dodd; June 30, 1911 Randolph, Iowa, U.S.
- Died: January 23, 2006 (aged 94) Sun City West, Arizona, U.S.
- Party: Republican
- Spouse: Haven N. Smith (m. 1931; died 1997)

Virginia Dodd Smith (June 30, 1911 – January 23, 2006) was a Republican member of the United States House of Representatives from 1975 to 1991 for Nebraska's 3rd district. She was the first and to date only woman from Nebraska to hold a seat in the House.

Before serving in Congress, Smith chaired the American Farm Bureau Women for twenty years.

== Congress ==
Smith was elected to succeed Representative Dave Martin in 1974. In the year of Watergate, she defeated her Democratic opponent Wayne Ziebarth by just 737 votes. However, she never faced another contest anywhere near that close, and was reelected seven more times from what has long been one of the most Republican districts in the nation. Proving just how Republican this district was, her lowest vote share apart from her initial bid was 69 percent in 1986, and she even ran unopposed in 1982.

== Death ==
She died in 2006 in Sun City West, Arizona at the age of 94. She is buried in Iowa alongside her husband, Haven, who died in 1997.

== See also ==
- Women in the United States House of Representatives

U.S. House of Representatives
Preceded by David Martin	Member of the U.S. House of Representatives from Nebraska's 3rd congressional district 1975–1991	Succeeded by Bill Barrett
