= Bill Barrett =

American politician (1929–2016)

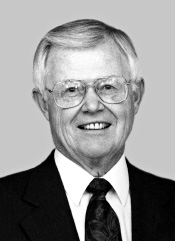

Member of the U.S. House of Representatives from Nebraska's 3rd district
- In office January 3, 1991 – January 3, 2001
- Preceded by: Virginia Smith
- Succeeded by: Tom Osborne

Speaker of the Nebraska Legislature
- In office 1987–1991
- Preceded by: William E. Nichol
- Succeeded by: Dennis G. Baack

Member of the Nebraska Legislature from the 39th district
- In office 1979–1991
- Preceded by: Herbert J. Duis
- Succeeded by: Edward J. Schrock

Personal details
- Born: William Edgar Barrett; February 9, 1929 Lexington, Nebraska, U.S.
- Died: September 20, 2016 (aged 87) Lexington, Nebraska, U.S.
- Party: Republican
- Spouse: Elsie
- Children: 4
- Education: Hastings College (BA)

William Emery Barrett (February 9, 1929 – September 20, 2016) was an American Republican politician from Nebraska who served five terms in the United States House of Representatives from 1991 to 2001 as the congressman for Nebraska's third congressional district.

== Biography ==
Barrett was born in Lexington, Nebraska. He attended Hastings College and then earned his license to become a real estate broker.

Before seeking elective office, he served in the United States Navy, was a longtime real estate agent and Republican activist. He had also previously served as an administrator at his college alma mater. Barrett served as a member of the Nebraska Republican State Executive Committee in the 1960s and chaired the Nebraska arm of President Gerald Ford's campaign in 1976.

In 1978, Barrett was elected to the unicameral Nebraska Legislature, where he served until his election to Congress. He was speaker of the legislature from 1987 to 1991 and generated some controversy in that position after heated state budget negotiations.

In 1990, Barrett entered the Republican primary for the 3rd District after eight-term incumbent Virginia D. Smith announced her retirement. Despite being the highest-profile candidate in the field, he only won the five-way primary by 2,000 votes. He then faced fellow state senator Sandra K. Scofield in the general election. Although Barrett was initially thought to be a prohibitive favorite in this heavily Republican district, the race was extremely close, with Barrett only prevailing by 4,400 votes. This was the closest a Democrat had come to winning the 3rd since Smith won her first race in 1974 by only 737 votes. Barrett never faced another contest nearly that close, and was reelected four more times by well over 70 percent of the vote; the Democrats did not field a challenger in 1998.

In Congress, Barrett was a low-key member who generally supported the priorities of Republican leaders. He served on the House Agriculture Committee, helping write the Freedom to Farm Act of 1996 and eventually rising to become vice chairman, as well as the Education and the Workforce Committee. Barrett retired from Congress in 2000 and resided in Lexington. He died on September 20, 2016, at age 87 at an assisted living facility in Lexington.

Nebraska Legislature
Preceded by Herbert J. Duis	Member of the Nebraska Legislature from the 39th district 1979–1991	Succeeded by Edward J. Schrock
Political offices
Preceded by William E. Nichol	Speaker of the Nebraska Legislature; 1987–1991	Succeeded by Dennis G. Baack
U.S. House of Representatives
Preceded by Virginia D. Smith	Member of the U.S. House of Representatives from Nebraska's 3rd congressional district 1991–2001	Succeeded by Tom Osborne
