= Pelham A. Barrows =

American politician (1861–1939)

16th Lieutenant Governor of Nebraska
- In office January 9, 1919 – January 4, 1923
- Governor: Samuel Roy McKelvie
- Preceded by: Edgar Howard
- Succeeded by: Fred Gustus Johnson

Personal details
- Born: March 13, 1861 Massachusetts
- Died: November 30, 1939 (aged 78) California
- Occupation: Politician

Pelham Anderson Barrows (March 13, 1861 – November 30, 1939) served as the 16th lieutenant governor of Nebraska from 1919 to 1923 under Governor Samuel Roy McKelvie. He also served a stint as commander of the Sons of Union Veterans of the Civil War. Barrows was born in Massachusetts. He later moved to California, where he died in 1939.

Political offices
Preceded by Edgar Howard	Lieutenant Governor of Nebraska; 1919–1923	Succeeded by Fred Gustus Johnson
