= Nebraska House of Representatives =

Defunct lower house in Nebraska (1854–1936)

- Nebraska Legislature

Type
- Type: Lower house

History
- Established: 1854
- Disbanded: 1936
- Succeeded by: Nebraska Legislature

Leadership
- First Territorial Speaker: Andrew J. Hanscom
- First Speaker: William A. Pollock

Structure
- Seats: 26 (1854–1858); 39 (1858–1875); 84 (1876–1880); 100 (1881–1936)
- Length of term: 2 years
- Authority: Article III, Nebraska Constitution (pre-1936)
- Salary: $800/year (1936)

Meeting place
- West Chamber, Nebraska State Capitol; Omaha (1854–1867); Lincoln (1867–1936)

The Nebraska House of Representatives was the lower house of the Nebraska Legislature during the time when Nebraska was a territory from 1854 to 1867 and then as a state from 1867 to 1936. In 1934, Nebraska voters amended the Nebraska Constitution to reconfigure the Nebraska Legislature to a unicameral system. This system became effective for the 1937 legislative session. In 1854, as the territorial lower house, it had 26 members; in 1858, this number was raised to 39 members. The second state constitution in 1875 limited membership in the House at 100 members, a limit which would be filled by 1881. The last representatives were elected to a two-year term in 1934 and began their service with the final legislative session in 1935.

== See also ==
- List of speakers of the Nebraska House of Representatives
- Members of the Nebraska House of Representatives
