= 1892 Nebraska gubernatorial election =

- November 8, 1892
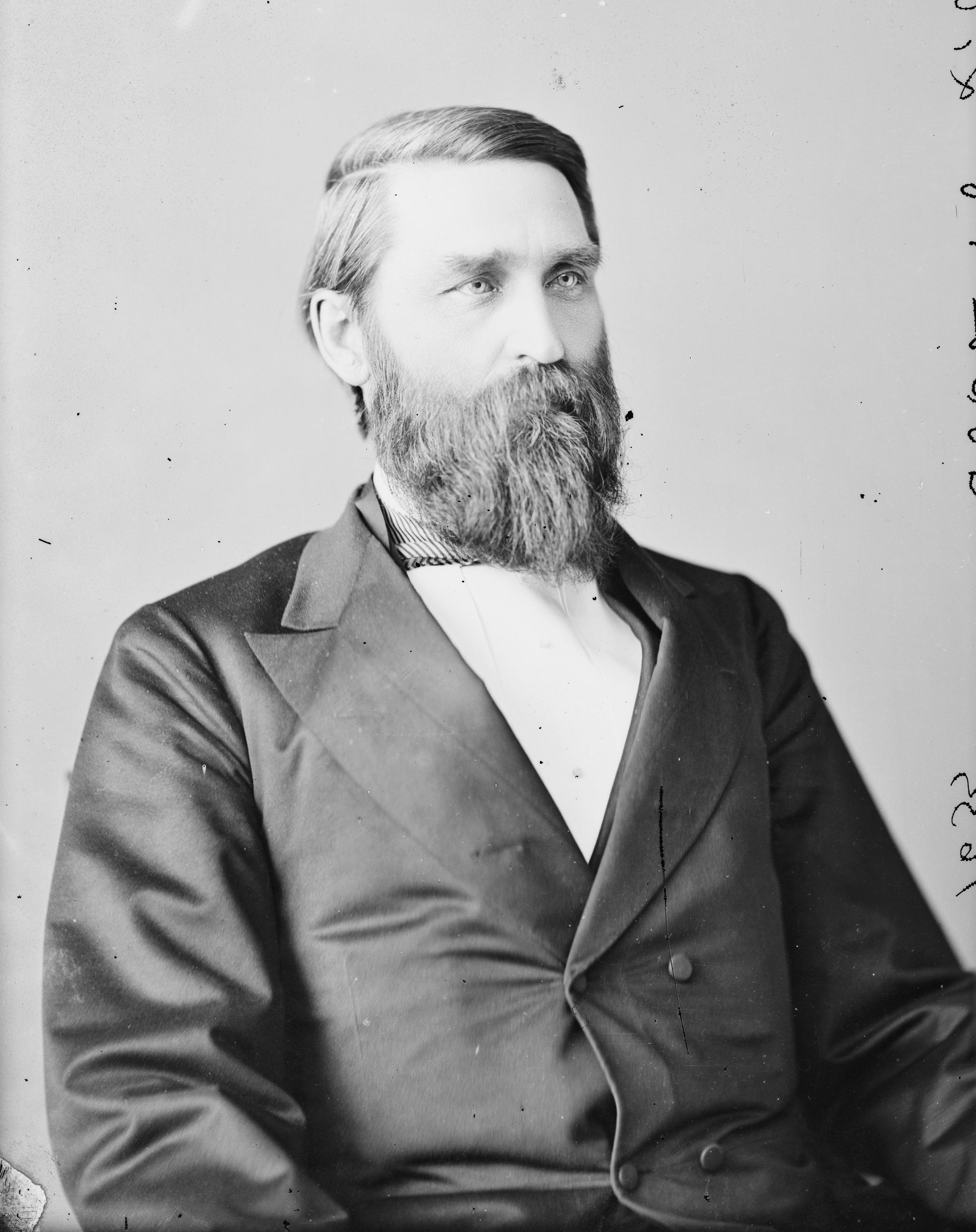

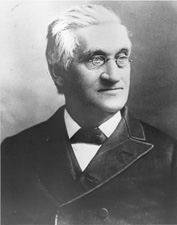

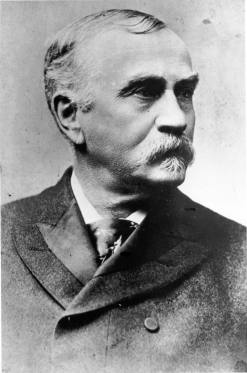
Nominee	Lorenzo Crounse	Charles Van Wyck	J. Sterling Morton
Party	Republican	Populist	Democratic
Popular vote	78,426	68,617	44,196
Percentage	39.71%	34.74%	22.38%
County results
Crounse
30–40%
40–50%
50–60%
Van Wyck
30–40%
40–50%
50–60%
60–70%
Morton
30–40%
40–50%
50–60%
Tie
40–50%
Governor before election
James E. Boyd
Democratic
Elected Governor
Lorenzo Crounse
Republican

The 1892 Nebraska gubernatorial election was held on November 8, 1892. Incumbent Democratic Governor James E. Boyd did not seek re-election. Lorenzo Crounse, the Republican nominee, defeated both the Democratic nominee, J. Sterling Morton, and the Populist nominee, Charles Van Wyck.

== General election ==
=== Candidates ===
- Charles Eugene Bentley, Prohibition candidate, chairman of the Nebraska Prohibition Party
- Lorenzo Crounse, Republican candidate, former justice on the Nebraska Supreme Court, former member of the U.S. House of Representatives from Nebraska's at-large congressional district, and Assistant Secretary of the United States Treasury
- J. Sterling Morton, Democratic candidate, former acting governor of Nebraska Territory and former Democratic candidate for governor of Nebraska in 1866, 1882, and 1884
- Charles Van Wyck, People's Independent (Populist) candidate, former Republican United States senator from Nebraska

=== Results ===
Nebraska gubernatorial election, 1892
Party	Candidate	Votes	%
Republican	Lorenzo Crounse	78,426	39.71%
Populist	Charles Van Wyck	68,617	34.74%
Democratic	J. Sterling Morton	44,196	22.38%
Prohibition	Charles Eugene Bentley	6,235	3.16%
Total votes		197,474	100.0%
Republican gain from Democratic			

== See also ==
- 1892 Nebraska lieutenant gubernatorial election
