= List of elections in 1882 =

The following elections occurred in the year 1882.

== Europe ==
- 1882 Belgian general election
- 1882 Bulgarian parliamentary election
- 1882 Italian general election
- 1882 Liechtenstein general election
- 1882 Norwegian parliamentary election

== North America ==
- 1882 Newfoundland general election

=== Canada ===
- 1882 British Columbia general election
- 1882 Canadian federal election
- 1882 New Brunswick general election
- 1882 Newfoundland general election
- 1882 Nova Scotia general election
- 1882 Prince Edward Island general election

=== United States ===
- 1882 New York state election
- 1882 United States elections

==== United States Senate ====
- 1882 and 1883 United States Senate elections

==== United States House of Representatives ====
- 1882 United States House of Representatives elections
- United States House of Representatives elections in California, 1882
- United States House of Representatives elections in Florida, 1882
- United States House of Representatives elections in South Carolina, 1882

==== United States lieutenant gubernatorial ====
- 1882 California lieutenant gubernatorial election
- 1882 Connecticut lieutenant gubernatorial election
- 1882 Nebraska lieutenant gubernatorial election
- 1882 Texas lieutenant gubernatorial election

==== United States gubernatorial ====
- 1882 Alabama gubernatorial election
- 1882 Arkansas gubernatorial election
- 1882 California gubernatorial election
- 1882 Colorado gubernatorial election
- 1882 Connecticut gubernatorial election
- 1882 Delaware gubernatorial election
- 1882 Georgia gubernatorial election
- 1882 Kansas gubernatorial election
- 1882 Maine gubernatorial election
- 1882 Massachusetts gubernatorial election
- 1882 Michigan gubernatorial election
- 1882 Nebraska gubernatorial election
- 1882 Nevada gubernatorial election
- 1882 New Hampshire gubernatorial election
- 1882 New York gubernatorial election
- 1882 Oregon gubernatorial election
- 1882 Pennsylvania gubernatorial election
- 1882 Rhode Island gubernatorial election
- 1882 South Carolina gubernatorial election
- 1882 Tennessee gubernatorial election
- 1882 Texas gubernatorial election
- 1882 Vermont gubernatorial election

==== United States mayoral elections ====
- 1882 Boston mayoral election
- 1882 Manchester, New Hampshire mayoral election

== See also ==
- Category:1882 elections
