= 1884 Nebraska gubernatorial election =

- November 4, 1884

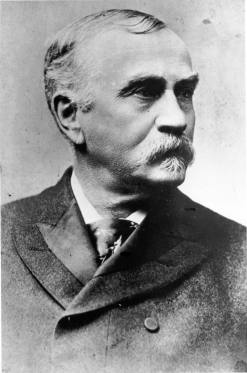
Nominee	James W. Dawes	J. Sterling Morton
Party	Republican	Democratic
Popular vote	72,835	57,634
Percentage	54.54%	43.15%
- County results Dawes: 40–50% 50–60% 60–70% 70–80% 80–90% Morton: 40–50% 50–60% 60–70% No Data/Votes
Governor before election
James W. Dawes
Republican
Elected Governor
James W. Dawes
Republican

The 1884 Nebraska gubernatorial election was held on November 4, 1884, and featured incumbent Governor James W. Dawes, a Republican, defeating Democratic nominee J. Sterling Morton for a second time after the 1882 election.

== General election ==
=== Candidates ===
- James W. Dawes, Republican candidate, incumbent Governor of Nebraska
- Rev. Jason G. Miller, Prohibition candidate
- J. Sterling Morton, Democratic candidate, former acting Governor of Nebraska Territory and former Democratic candidate for Governor of Nebraska in the 1866 and 1882 elections.

=== Results ===
Nebraska gubernatorial election, 1884
Party	Candidate	Votes	%
Republican	James W. Dawes (incumbent)	72,835	54.54%
Democratic	J. Sterling Morton	57,634	43.15%
Prohibition	Jason G. Miller	3,075	2.30%
Scattering		11	
Total votes		133,555	100.0%
Republican hold			

== See also ==
- 1884 Nebraska lieutenant gubernatorial election
