= 1890 Nebraska gubernatorial election =

- November 4, 1890
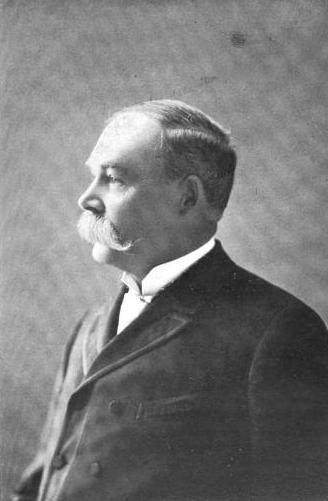

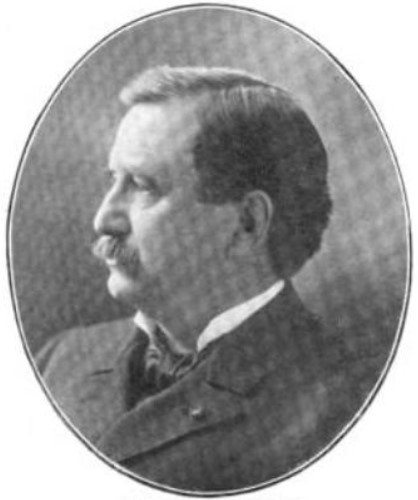
| Nominee | James E. Boyd | John H. Powers | Lucius D. Richards |
| Party | Democratic | Populist | Republican |
| Popular vote | 71,331 | 70,187 | 68,878 |
| Percentage | 33.32% | 32.78% | 32.17% |
- County results Boyd: 30–40% 40–50% 50–60% 60–70% 70–80% Powers: 30–40% 40–50% 50–60% 60–70% 70–80% Crounse: 30–40% 40–50% 50–60% 60–70% No votes
Governor before election
John Milton Thayer
Republican
Elected Governor
James E. Boyd
Democratic

The 1890 Nebraska gubernatorial election was held on November 4, 1890. Incumbent Republican Governor John Milton Thayer did not seek reelection.

In a four-way race, James E. Boyd, the Democratic nominee, defeated the Populist nominee John H. Powers, the Republican nominee Lucius D. Richards, and the Prohibition nominee Bartlett L. Paine. Boyd thus became the first Democratic candidate to be elected governor of Nebraska.

== General election ==
=== Candidates ===
- James E. Boyd, Democratic candidate, former mayor of Omaha, Nebraska, from 1881 to 1883 and 1885 to 1887
- Dr. Bartlett L. Paine, Prohibition candidate, co-founder of Miller & Paine, a department store in Lincoln, Nebraska
- John H. Powers, Populist candidate, president of the Farmers' Alliance
- Lucius D. Richards, Republican candidate, former mayor of Fremont, Nebraska, and chairman of the Nebraska Republican state central committee

=== Results ===
Nebraska gubernatorial election, 1890
| Party | Candidate | Votes | % |
|---|---|---|---|
| Democratic | James E. Boyd | 71,331 (Note: Some newspaper accounts at the time reported a total of 71,271 for Boyd.) | 33.32% |
| Populist | John H. Powers | 70,187 (Note: Some newspaper accounts at the time reported a total of 70,287 for Powers.) | 32.78% |
| Republican | Lucius D. Richards | 68,878 (Note: Some newspaper accounts at the time reported a total of 68,888 for Richards.) | 32.17% |
| Prohibition | Bartlett L. Paine | 3,676 (Note: Most newspaper accounts at the time failed to report a total for Paine.) | 1.72% |
| Scattering | | 18 | |
| Total votes | | 214,090 | 100.0% |
| Democratic gain from Republican | | | |

== Aftermath ==
After James E. Boyd was declared the winner, his opponent, John H. Powers, disputed the results of the election. While Boyd won by a margin of 1,144 votes, Powers claimed to have evidence that "2000 persons were bribed in Douglas County to vote for Boyd." A resolution to investigate these allegations was introduced in a joint session of the Nebraska Legislature, but it was ruled out of order.

However, the trouble was not over for Boyd. He was due to be sworn in as governor of Nebraska on January 8, 1891, but John Milton Thayer, who was not a candidate in the 1890 election, challenged Boyd's citizenship, and thus his eligibility to be governor. This delayed Boyd's inauguration until January 15. Boyd took office as governor; however, he only served until May 5, 1891, because the Supreme Court of Nebraska ruled that Boyd was ineligible to be governor, and thus Thayer took office again on May 5. Boyd took his case, Boyd v. Nebraska ex rel. Thayer, to the United States Supreme Court, and it was argued on December 8, 1891. On February 1, 1892, the Supreme Court of the United States ruled that Boyd was eligible, and thus he took office again on February 8, 1892, and served out the remainder of his term.

== See also ==
- 1890 Nebraska lieutenant gubernatorial election
