= 1890 Nebraska lieutenant gubernatorial election =

- November 4, 1890
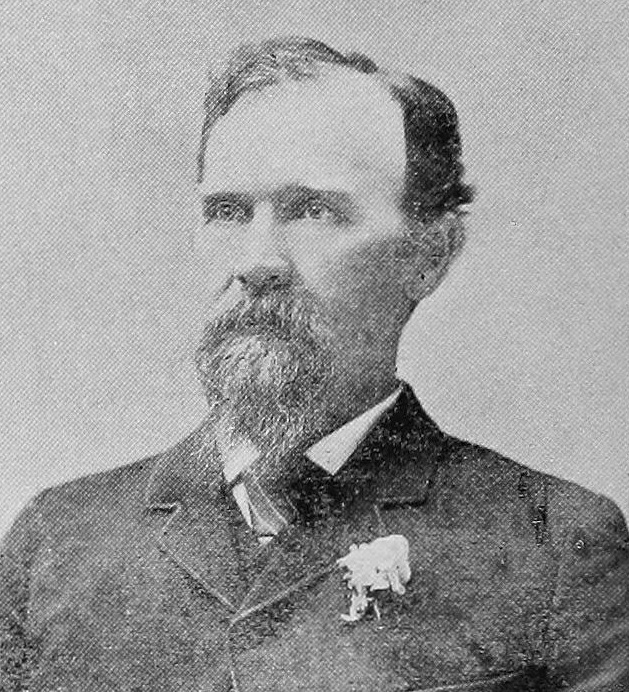

Nominee	Thomas J. Majors	William H. Dech	Alex Bear
Party	Republican	Populist	Democratic
Popular vote	74,386	71,127	63,468
Percentage	34.8%	33.3%	29.7%
Lieutenant Governor before election
George de Rue Meiklejohn
Republican
Elected Lieutenant Governor
Thomas J. Majors
Republican

The 1890 Nebraska lieutenant gubernatorial election was held on November 4, 1890, and featured Republican nominee Thomas Jefferson Majors defeating Populist nominee William H. Dech and Democratic nominee Alex Bear as well as Prohibition Party nominee George W. Woodbey. Incumbent Nebraska Lieutenant Governor George D. Meiklejohn did not seek reelection as lieutenant governor in order to seek the Republican nomination for the US House of Representatives in Nebraska's 3rd congressional district, but he was unsuccessful.

For the Republican and Democratic candidates, Thomas J. Majors and Alex Bear, this election represented a rematch of a special election for Nebraska's at-large congressional district where both Majors and Bear ran against each other to fill the vacancy created by the death of Frank Welch. Majors was ultimately successful in that election.

This was the first Nebraska election in which members of different parties were elected to the offices of governor and lieutenant governor, as James E. Boyd, a Democrat, was elected governor while Thomas J. Majors retained the office of lieutenant governor for the Republicans.

== General election ==
=== Candidates ===
- Dr. Alexander Bear, Democratic candidate, physician, surgeon, former member of the Nebraska Senate from 1875 to 1877 and of the Nebraska House of Representatives from 1877 to 1879 from Norfolk, Nebraska, and former member of the University of Nebraska Board of Regents. He was nominated by the Democratic convention over J. R. Burks of Gage County, Nebraska, by a vote of 379 to 156.
- William H. Dech, Populist candidate, former member of the Nebraska Senate from 1883 to 1885 and of the Nebraska House of Representatives from 1873 to 1875 from Ithaca, Nebraska. He served as a school director and as a road supervisor in Saunders County, Nebraska. He was associated with the Farmers' Alliance and with its gubernatorial nominee John H. Powers.
- Thomas Jefferson Majors, Republican candidate, director of the Citizens' State Bank, member of the Nebraska House of Representatives since 1889, former US Representative for Nebraska's at-large congressional district from 1878 to 1879, former member of the last session of the Territorial Council of the Nebraska Territorial Legislature in 1867 and former member of the Nebraska Senate from 1867 to 1869 and again from 1887 to 1889 from Peru, Nebraska
- Rev. George Washington Woodbey, Prohibition candidate, pastor from Omaha, Nebraska, who was born under slavery and was one of the first African Americans to run for statewide office in Nebraska

=== Results ===
Nebraska lieutenant gubernatorial election, 1890
Party	Candidate	Votes	%
Republican	Thomas J. Majors	74,386	34.84
Populist	William H. Dech	71,127	33.31
Democratic	Alex Bear	63,468	29.72
Prohibition	George W. Woodbey	4,515	2.11
Scattering		24	
Total votes		213,520	100.00
Republican hold			

== See also ==
- 1890 Nebraska gubernatorial election
