= 1884 Nebraska lieutenant gubernatorial election =

- November 4, 1884
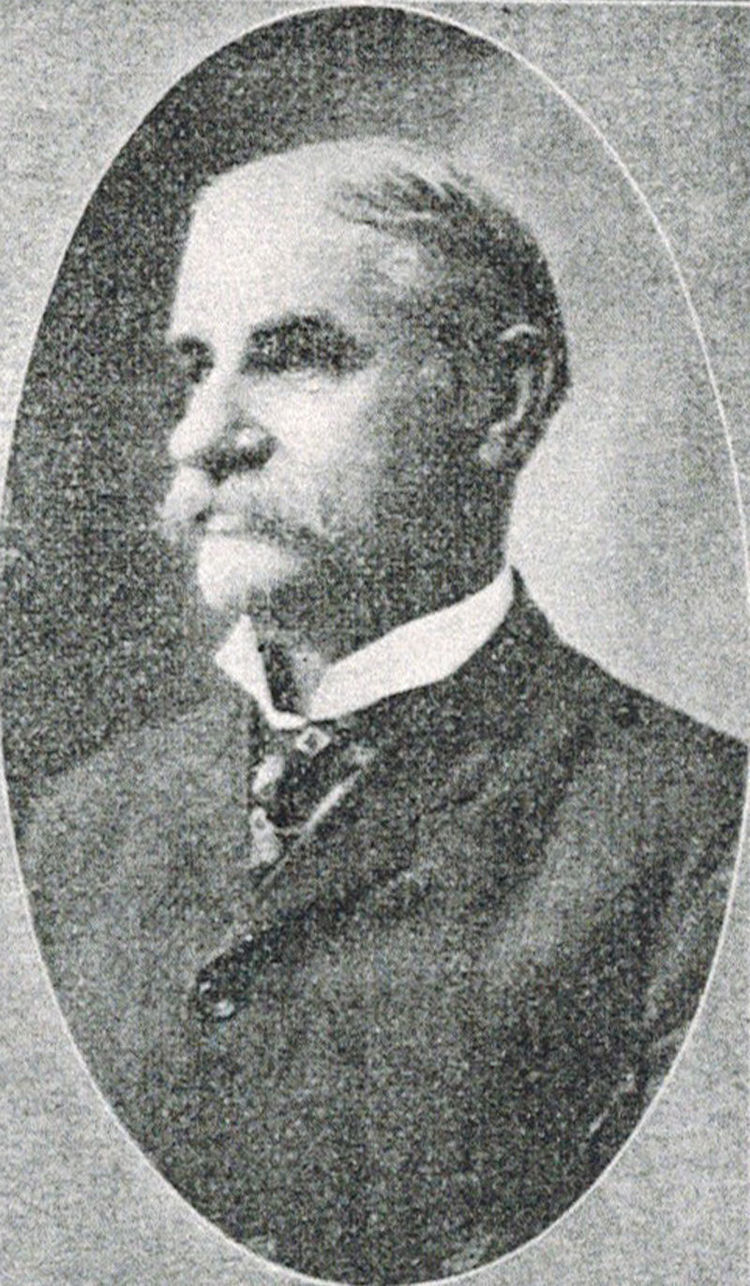

Nominee	Hibbard H. Shedd	Lewis C. Pace
Party	Republican	Democratic
Alliance		Greenback
Popular vote	77,947	55,953
Percentage	58.2%	41.8%
Lieutenant Governor before election
Alfred W. Agee
Republican
Elected Lieutenant Governor
Hibbard H. Shedd
Republican

The 1884 Nebraska lieutenant gubernatorial election was held on November 4, 1884, and featured Republican nominee Hibbard H. Shedd defeating fusion Democratic and Greenback (Anti-Monopoly) nominee Lewis C. Pace. Incumbent Nebraska Lieutenant Governor Alfred W. Agee was renominated at the Nebraska Republican state convention, but he was defeated for the nomination by Shedd by a vote of 292 to 153 of the delegates.

== General election ==
=== Candidates ===
- Col. Lewis Clark Pace, Democratic candidate who had also been associated with the Greenback Party, which, at its convention, decided to form a fusion ticket with the Democratic party
- Hibbard H. Shedd, Republican candidate, men's clothier and tailor, member of the Nebraska Constitutional Convention of 1875, and former member and Speaker of the Nebraska House of Representatives from 1881 to 1883 from Ashland, Nebraska

=== Results ===
Nebraska lieutenant gubernatorial election, 1884
Party	Candidate	Votes	%
Republican	Hibbard H. Shedd	77,947	58.21
Democratic	Lewis C. Pace (Note: Cross-endorsed on a fusion ticket with the Greenback (Anti-Monopoly) Party.)	55,953	41.78
Scattering		8	
Total votes		133,908	100.00
Republican hold			

== See also ==
- 1884 Nebraska gubernatorial election
