= William Chapin =

William Chapin may refer to:

- Billy Chapin (1943–2016), American child actor
- William F. Chapin (1831–1885), American politician
- William R. Chapin (born 1948), American businessman
