= 1880 Nebraska lieutenant gubernatorial election =

- November 2, 1880

Nominee	Edmund C. Carns	T. J. Hamilton
Party	Republican	Democratic
Popular vote	53,521	27,025
Percentage	62.6%	31.6%
Lieutenant Governor before election
Edmund C. Carns
Republican
Elected Lieutenant Governor
Edmund C. Carns
Republican

The 1880 Nebraska lieutenant gubernatorial election was held on November 2, 1880, and featured incumbent Nebraska Lieutenant Governor Edmund C. Carns, a Republican, defeating Democratic nominee T. J. Hamilton as well as Greenback nominee Peter Lansing and former Democratic nominee Samuel H. Calhoun. (Note: Samuel H. Calhoun was also referred to as "Stephen H. Calhoun" in Volume 3 of the Illustrated History of Nebraska by Albert Watkins) Originally, the Democratic party had nominated Calhoun for lieutenant governor. However, on October 11, 1880, Calhoun withdrew his candidacy, and the Democratic state central committee appointed T. J. Hamilton to replace him.

== General election ==
=== Candidates ===
- Samuel H. Calhoun, original Democratic candidate, former member of the Nebraska Senate during its first session in 1866 and 1867 from Nebraska City, Nebraska
- Edmund C. Carns, Republican candidate and incumbent Nebraska Lieutenant Governor from Seward, Nebraska
- T. J. Hamilton, replacement Democratic candidate, a judge from Seward, Nebraska
- Peter Lansing, Greenback candidate from Saunders County, Nebraska

=== Results ===
Nebraska lieutenant gubernatorial election, 1880
Party	Candidate	Votes	%
Republican	Edmund C. Carns (incumbent)	53,521	62.64
Democratic	T. J. Hamilton	27,025	31.63
Greenback	Peter Lansing	3,890	4.55
Democratic	Samuel H. Calhoun	912	1.07
Scattering		96	
Total votes		85,444	100.00
Republican hold			

== See also ==
- 1880 Nebraska gubernatorial election
