= Lucius D. Richards =

Nebraska politician

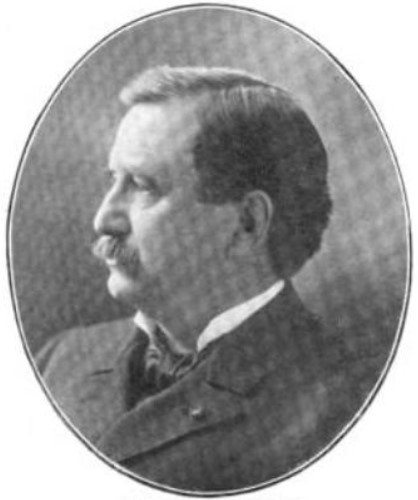

Mayor of Fremont, Nebraska
- In office 1879–1881
- Preceded by: N. H. Bell
- Succeeded by: Charles Sang

Personal details
- Born: November 26, 1847 Charleston, Vermont, U.S.
- Died: August 19, 1931 (aged 83) Fremont, Nebraska, U.S.
- Party: Republican
- Spouse: Carro Emma Hills (m. 1871)
- Children: 4

Lucius Dunbar Richards (November 26, 1847 – August 19, 1931) was a banker and businessman who served as the mayor of Fremont, Nebraska, for two terms and ran unsuccessfully for Governor of Nebraska in the 1890 election.

== Early life ==
Richards was born in Charleston, Vermont, on November 26, 1947, to parents Silas and Sarah Richards. At the age of 14 in August 1862, he enlisted in Company I, Fifteenth Vermont Volunteer Infantry to fight in the Civil War. He fought at the Battle of Gettysburg. Richards' regiment was commanded by Redfield Proctor, who later became United States Secretary of War and a United States Senator. Richards served nine months as Proctor's orderly which resulted in a lifelong friendship. Richards later reenlisted in Company K, Seventeenth Vermont Volunteer Infantry.

== Early career in Fremont ==
After the Civil War, Richards farmed in Michigan and then entered a business college in New York where he studied railroads and later became an engineer with the Sioux City and Pacific Railroad. He arrived in Fremont, Nebraska in 1868 to survey for the railroad. While surveying for the Fremont, Elkhorn & Missouri Valley Railroad, he platted the town sites of Nickerson, Hooper, and Scribner. In 1872, Richards left to work as an engineer in Costa Rica and became a railway superintendent there.

Richards returned to Fremont in 1875 to become a businessman. He founded Richards, Keene, and Company and served as its president for 55 years. He also founded the Fremont Stockyards and Land Company and served as its president for 44 years. He also founded the First Savings Bank which later merged into the Fremont National Bank.

== Political career ==
In 1879, Richards became mayor of Fremont and served in that position for two terms until 1881. As mayor, he helped to organize the Fremont Board of Trade which later became the Fremont Chamber of Commerce. At various times, Richards served as the chairman of the Fremont Board of Public Works for 25 years, as Dodge County surveyor for three years, and as Fremont city engineer. He also helped establish the first creamery at Fremont.

Richards later served as the chairman of the Republican state central committee from 1887 to 1890. In 1890, he was chosen by the Republican Party as its nominee for Governor of Nebraska. However, Richards lost the 1890 election to Democrat James E. Boyd. He continued to be involved in Republican Party politics in the State of Nebraska throughout his life. Richards served as a delegate to the 1892 Republican National Convention and also as chairman of the Nebraska delegation at the 1920 Republican National Convention in Chicago.

== Personal life ==
Richards married Carro Emma Hills on January 9, 1871, and they had four children. Richards' wife Carro died on December 10, 1915. Richards died after a ten-day illness on August 19, 1931, at his home in Fremont, Nebraska.

Richards was a lifelong admirer of Abraham Lincoln and donated funds in order to build a statue of Lincoln which now stands overlooking Highway 77 in Fremont City Park.

Party political offices
Preceded by John Milton Thayer	Republican nominee for Governor of Nebraska; 1890	Succeeded by Lorenzo Crounse
