= 1878 Nebraska gubernatorial election =

- November 5, 1878
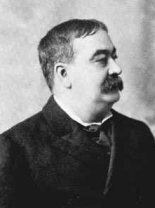

Nominee	Albinus Nance	William H. Webster	Levi G. Todd
Party	Republican	Democratic	Greenback
Popular vote	29,469	13,473	9,475
Percentage	56.22%	25.70%	18.08%
- County results Nance: 30–40% 40–50% 50–60% 60–70% 70–80% 80–90% >90% Webster: 50–60% 60–70% 70–80% 80–90% Todd: 40–50% 70–80% No Votes
Governor before election
Silas Garber
Republican
Elected Governor
Albinus Nance
Republican

The 1878 Nebraska gubernatorial election was held on November 5, 1878. Incumbent Republican governor Silas Garber did not seek reelection. This election featured Republican nominee Albinus Nance, the Speaker of the Nebraska House of Representatives, defeating Democratic nominee Colonel William H. Webster, a lawyer from Merrick County, Nebraska, and Greenback Party nominee Levi G. Todd, a former member of the Nebraska Territorial House of Representatives from Cass County, Nebraska.

== General election ==
=== Candidates ===
- Albinus Nance, Republican candidate, member of the Nebraska House of Representatives from 1875 to 1878, serving as Speaker from 1877 to 1878
- Col. William H. Webster, Democratic candidate, lawyer from Merrick County, Nebraska.
- Levi Goodsell Todd, Greenback candidate, member of the Nebraska Territorial House of Representatives from 1863 to 1864 from Cass County, Nebraska.

=== Results ===
Nebraska gubernatorial election, 1878
Party	Candidate	Votes	%
Republican	Albinus Nance	29,469	56.22%
Democratic	William H. Webster	13,473	25.70%
Greenback	Levi G. Todd	9,475	18.08%
Total votes		52,417	100.0%
Republican hold			

== See also ==
- 1878 Nebraska lieutenant gubernatorial election
