= 1882 Nebraska lieutenant gubernatorial election =

- November 7, 1882

Nominee	Alfred W. Agee	Jesse F. Warner	D. P. Reynolds (Note: Several sources, including newspapers from Reynolds' home county of Hamilton, refer to him as "P. B. Reynolds" instead of "D. P. Reynolds." The name "D. P. Reynolds" is also widely used in newspaper sources and is the name given in the official results in the 1883 House Journal of the Legislature of the State of Nebraska. He is also referred to as "D. B. Reynolds" in Volume 3 of the Illustrated History of Nebraska by Albert Watkins)
Party	Republican	Democratic	Greenback
Popular vote	44,520	26,622	17,656
Percentage	50.1%	30.0%	19.9%
Lieutenant Governor before election
Edmund C. Carns
Republican
Elected Lieutenant Governor
Alfred W. Agee
Republican

The 1882 Nebraska lieutenant gubernatorial election was held on November 7, 1882, and featured Republican nominee Alfred W. Agee defeating Democratic nominee Jesse F. Warner as well as Greenback nominee D. P. Reynolds.

== General election ==
=== Candidates ===
- Alfred W. Agee, Republican candidate and attorney from Aurora, Nebraska
- D. P. Reynolds, Greenback (Anti-Monopoly) candidate and farmer from Hamilton County, Nebraska
- Col. Jesse F. Warner, Democratic candidate, former member of the Nebraska House of Representatives from 1879 to 1881 from Dakota City, Nebraska

=== Results ===
Nebraska lieutenant gubernatorial election, 1882
Party	Candidate	Votes	%
Republican	Alfred W. Agee	44,520	50.13
Democratic	Jesse F. Warner	26,622	29.98
Greenback	D. P. Reynolds	17,656	19.88
Scattering		10	
Total votes		88,808	100.00
Republican hold			

== See also ==
- 1882 Nebraska gubernatorial election
