= 1880 Nebraska gubernatorial election =

- November 2, 1880
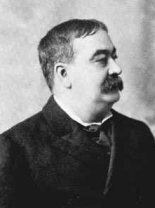

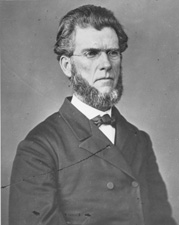
Nominee	Albinus Nance	Thomas W. Tipton
Party	Republican	Democratic
Popular vote	55,237	28,167
Percentage	63.24%	32.25%
- County results Nance: 40–50% 50–60% 60–70% 70–80% 80–90% Tipton: 50–60% 60–70% No Data/Votes
Governor before election
Albinus Nance
Republican
Elected Governor
Albinus Nance
Republican

The 1880 Nebraska gubernatorial election was held on November 2, 1880, in order to elect the Governor of Nebraska. Incumbent Republican Governor of Nebraska Albinus Nance defeated Democratic nominee Thomas Tipton, who had formerly served as a Republican US Senator from Nebraska.

On election day, Republican nominee Albinus Nance won re-election by a margin of 27,070 votes against his foremost opponent, Democratic nominee Thomas Tipton, thereby holding Republican control over the office of Governor. Nance was sworn in for his second term on January 4, 1881.

== General election ==
=== Candidates ===
- Albinus Nance, Republican candidate, incumbent Governor of Nebraska
- Thomas W. Tipton, Democratic candidate, lawyer and former Republican US Senator from Nebraska from 1867 to 1875
- Oliver T. B. Williams, Greenback candidate, former mayor of Columbus, Nebraska, from 1866 to 1867 and former member of the Nebraska Senate also from 1866 to 1867

=== Results ===
Nebraska gubernatorial election, 1880
Party	Candidate	Votes	%
Republican	Albinus Nance (incumbent)	55,237	63.24
Democratic	Thomas Tipton	28,167	32.25
Greenback	Oliver T. B. Williams	3,898	4.46
Scattering		43	0.05
Total votes		87,345	100.00
Republican hold			

== See also ==
- 1880 Nebraska lieutenant gubernatorial election
