= 1878 Nebraska lieutenant gubernatorial election =

- November 5, 1878

Nominee	Edmund C. Carns	Theron M. Blakely
Party	Republican	Greenback
Alliance		Democratic
Popular vote	29,325	22,606
Percentage	55.9%	43.1%
Lieutenant Governor before election
Othman A. Abbott
Republican
Elected Lieutenant Governor
Edmund C. Carns
Republican

The 1878 Nebraska lieutenant gubernatorial election was held on November 5, 1878, and featured Republican nominee Edmund C. Carns defeating Greenback and Democratic nominee Theron M. Blakely as well as the original Democratic nominee F. J. Mead who still received some votes. Originally, the Democratic party had nominated F. J. Mead for lieutenant governor. However, in late October 1878, the state central committees of the Democratic and Greenback parties met in Lincoln, Nebraska, and decided to replace F. J. Mead with Greenback candidate Theron M. Blakely on the ticket for lieutenant governor.

== General election ==
=== Candidates ===
- Theron M. Blakely, Greenback and Democratic candidate from Madison County, Nebraska
- Edmund C. Carns, Republican candidate, member of the Nebraska Senate since 1877 from Seward, Nebraska
- F. J. Mead, original Democratic candidate from Saunders County, Nebraska

=== Results ===
Nebraska lieutenant gubernatorial election, 1878
Party	Candidate	Votes	%
Republican	Edmund C. Carns	29,325	55.89
Greenback	Theron M. Blakely	22,606	43.09
Democratic	F. J. Mead	534	1.02
Total votes		52,465	100.00
Republican hold			

== See also ==
- 1878 Nebraska gubernatorial election
