= George M. Humphrey (Nebraska politician) =

19th century American politician

10th Speaker of the Nebraska House of Representatives
- In office January 2, 1883 – January 6, 1885
- Preceded by: Hibbard H. Shedd
- Succeeded by: Allen W. Field

Personal details
- Born: 1839 New York, U.S.
- Died: November 10, 1894 (aged 54–55) Pawnee City, Nebraska, U.S.
- Cause of death: Bright's disease
- Resting place: Pawnee City Cemetery, Pawnee City, Nebraska
- Party: Republican
- Spouses: Mary Farrell Riley (died 1880); Ida Briggs (died 1931)
- Children: Guess Humphrey^{(b. 1881; died 1951)}; Victor Grant Humphrey^{(b. 1885; died 1942)}

Military service
- Allegiance: United States
- Branch/service: United States Volunteers; Union Army
- Years of service: 1861–1865
- Rank: Captain, USV
- Unit: 2nd Reg. Wis. Vol. Infantry; 42nd Reg. Wis. Vol. Infantry
- Battles/wars: American Civil War

George Millard Humphrey (1839 – November 10, 1894) was an American lawyer and Republican politician. He served as the speaker of the Nebraska House of Representatives in 1883. During the American Civil War he served in the Iron Brigade of the Army of the Potomac.

== Biography ==
George M. Humphrey was born in New York in 1839. As a young man he moved to Lodi, Wisconsin, and studied law in the office of Richard Lindsay.

His studies were interrupted by the outbreak of the American Civil War and he was among the earliest volunteers for service in the Union Army. He was enrolled as a private in Company H of the 2nd Wisconsin Infantry Regiment and mustered into federal service with the regiment in June 1861. He was wounded in the First Battle of Bull Run, just a month after the start of his service, but returned to the regiment.

In the Fall of 1861, the 2nd Wisconsin Infantry was organized into a brigade with three other Wisconsin and Indiana regiments which would shortly become known as the Iron Brigade of the Army of the Potomac. Humphrey served with the brigade through the next three years of the war. He was commissioned 2nd lieutenant on June 11, 1862, and was promoted to 1st lieutenant two months later. He participated in the battles of Antietam and Gettysburg, and Grant's Overland Campaign.

His three-year enlistment expired in June 1864, but shortly afterward he re-enlisted with the 42nd Wisconsin Infantry Regiment and was commissioned captain of Company C in that regiment. Soon after re-entering the service, however, he was detailed as an adjutant and ordinance officer until the end of the war.

After the war, he was admitted to the bar and moved to Pawnee City, Nebraska, where he began a legal practice. He was active with the Republican Party in Nebraska, and was elected to the Nebraska House of Representatives, serving as speaker during the 1883 session. He was nominated for election to the Nebraska Supreme Court, but withdrew from the race before the election.

He died at his home in Pawnee City in November 1894 after a long illness.

Nebraska Legislature
Preceded by Hibbard H. Shedd	Speaker of the Nebraska House of Representatives; January 2, 1883 – January 6, 1885	Succeeded by Allen W. Field
