= Boyd's Packing House =

Coordinates: 41.2428°N 95.9187°W

- Industry: Pork processing
- Founded: 1872 in Omaha, Nebraska, United States
- Founder: James E. Boyd
- Defunct: 1882
- Fate: Sold

Boyd's Packing House was the first packing house in Omaha, Nebraska. Founded by Irish-born James Boyd in 1872, the plant processed pork initially. The plant was destroyed by fire January 18, 1880, and was rebuilt much larger. Boyd sold his plant in 1887.

== See also ==
- History of Omaha, Nebraska
- Economy of Omaha, Nebraska
