= 1892 Nebraska lieutenant gubernatorial election =

- November 8, 1892
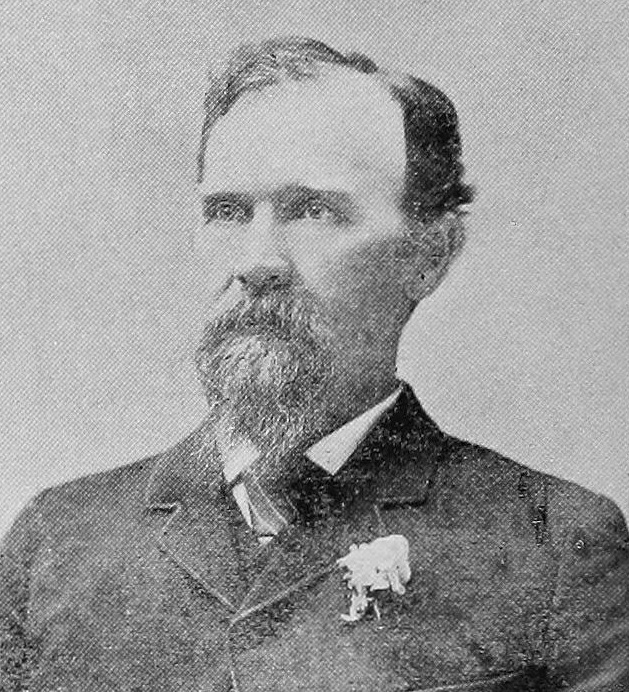

Nominee	Thomas J. Majors	Charles D. Shrader	Samuel N. Wolbach
Party	Republican	Populist	Democratic
Popular vote	81,500	62,501	46,421
Percentage	41.6%	31.9%	23.7%
Lieutenant Governor before election
Thomas J. Majors
Republican
Elected Lieutenant Governor
Thomas J. Majors
Republican

The 1892 Nebraska lieutenant gubernatorial election was held on November 8, 1892, and featured incumbent Nebraska Lieutenant Governor Thomas Jefferson Majors, a Republican, defeating Populist nominee Charles D. Shrader and Democratic nominee Samuel N. Wolbach as well as Prohibition Party nominee James Stephen.

== General election ==
=== Candidates ===
- Thomas Jefferson Majors, Republican candidate, incumbent Nebraska Lieutenant Governor from Peru, Nebraska
- Charles D. Shrader, Populist candidate, farmer and member of the Nebraska House of Representatives since 1891 from Logan, Nebraska
- James Stephen, Prohibition candidate, lawyer and businessman in the lumber industry from Central City, Nebraska
- Samuel N. Wolbach, Democratic candidate, merchant, banker, and former member of the Nebraska House of Representatives from 1885 to 1857 and of the Nebraska Senate from 1887 to 1891 from Grand Island, Nebraska

=== Campaign ===
During the campaign, it was alleged by some that Charles Van Wyck, the Populist candidate for governor of Nebraska, was really seeking that office in order to provide a pathway to get reelected to the US Senate. This, some argued, meant that Charles D. Shrader was in effect running for governor and not only lieutenant governor.

Shrader also challenged his Republican opponent, Thomas J. Majors, to a public debate. However Majors, with the support of the Republican party, refused to debate Shrader, citing an earlier incident wherein Shrader, while serving in the Nebraska House of Representatives, allegedly said "the supreme court be damned" or "damn the constitution" in response to an unfavorable judicial decision. Based on this incident, some accused Schrader of being an "anarchist," but Shrader maintained that such was a lie and that his words were twisted.

=== Results ===
Nebraska lieutenant gubernatorial election, 1892
Party	Candidate	Votes	%
Republican	Thomas J. Majors (incumbent)	81,500	41.58
Populist	Charles D. Shrader	62,501	31.89
Democratic	Samuel N. Wolbach	46,421	23.68
Prohibition	James Stephen	5,594	2.85
Total votes		196,016	100.00
Republican hold			

== See also ==
- 1892 Nebraska gubernatorial election
