= 1882 Nebraska gubernatorial election =

- November 7, 1882

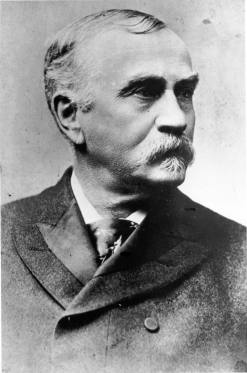

Nominee	James W. Dawes	J. Sterling Morton	Edward P. Ingersoll
Party	Republican	Democratic	Greenback
Popular vote	43,495	28,562	16,991
Percentage	48.83%	32.07%	19.07%
- County results Dawes: 40–50% 50–60% 60–70% 70–80% Morton: 40–50% 50–60% 60–70% Ingersoll: 40–50% 50–60% No Votes
Governor before election
Albinus Nance
Republican
Elected Governor
James W. Dawes
Republican

The 1882 Nebraska gubernatorial election was held on November 7, 1882. Incumbent Republican governor Albinus Nance did not seek reelection. This election featured James W. Dawes, a Republican, defeating Democratic nominee J. Sterling Morton and Greenback nominee Edward P. Ingersoll.

== General election ==
=== Candidates ===
- James W. Dawes, Republican candidate, delegate to the State Constitutional Convention in 1875, former member of the Nebraska Senate in 1877, and chairman of the Republican State Central Committee since 1876
- Edward Pason Ingersoll, Greenback (anti-monopoly) candidate, farmer, former Republican Party member, and chairman of the Nebraska Anti-Monopoly (Greenback) Party
- J. Sterling Morton, Democratic candidate, former acting Governor of Nebraska Territory and former Democratic candidate for Governor of Nebraska in the 1866 election

=== Results ===
Nebraska gubernatorial election, 1884
Party	Candidate	Votes	%
Republican	James W. Dawes	43,495	48.83%
Democratic	J. Sterling Morton	28,562	32.07%
Greenback	Edward P. Ingersoll	16,991	19.07%
Scattering		27	
Total votes		133,555	100.0%
Republican hold			

== See also ==
- 1882 Nebraska lieutenant gubernatorial election
