= Scribner, Nebraska =

- City
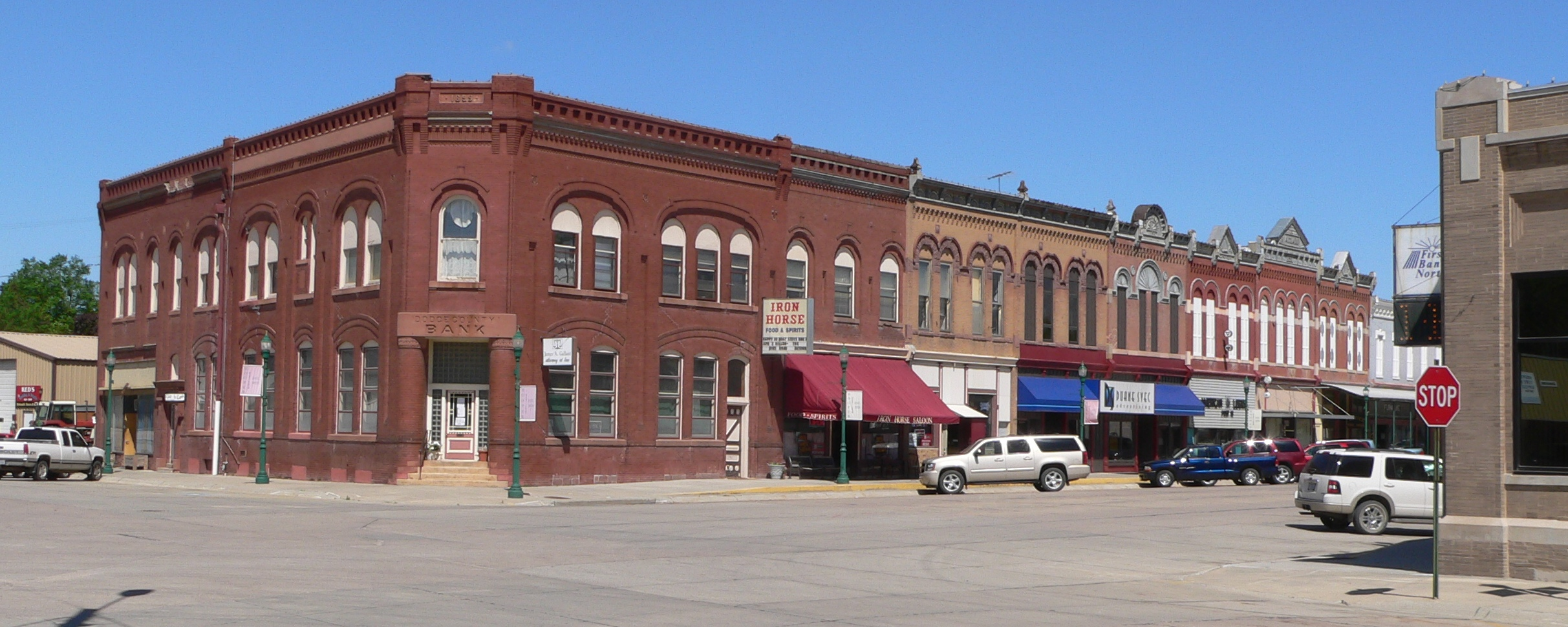
- Downtown Scribner

- Location of Scribner, Nebraska
- Coordinates: 41°39′54″N 96°39′55″W
- Country: United States
- State: Nebraska
- County: Dodge

Area
  - Total: 0.66 sq mi (1.72 km^{2})
  - Land: 0.65 sq mi (1.69 km^{2})
  - Water: 0.015 sq mi (0.04 km^{2})
- Elevation: 1,253 ft (382 m)

Population (2020)
  - Total: 843
  - Density: 1,294.6/sq mi (499.85/km^{2})
- Time zone: UTC-6 (Central (CST))
  - Summer (DST): UTC-5 (CDT)
- ZIP code: 68057
- Area code: 402
- FIPS code: 31-44280
- GNIS feature ID: 838238
- Website: https://www.scribner-ne.gov

Scribner is a city in Dodge County, Nebraska, United States. As of the 2020 census, Scribner had a population of 843.

== History ==
Scribner was platted in 1870 by Lucius D. Richards when the railroad was extended to that point. It was named for publishing magnate Charles Scribner I. Today, Scribner remains a town of trade, even though the railroad no longer serves the town.

By the 1970s, the future of railroad service came into question. The Chicago & North Western was running fewer trains on the track through town. As the decade progressed, the train traffic continued to decline, sparking discussion about potential abandonment. Revenue railroad service ultimately ended in spring of 1982, when flooding from the Elkhorn River & nearby Pebble Creek damaged sections of the track. With freight traffic mildly declining & flooding damage, the C&NW promptly filed a request with the Interstate Commerce Commission to abandon the line. Permission was granted a short time later, leaving the tracks with a dismal future. Plans were made to revive railroad service from the newly formed Fremont & Elkhorn Valley Railroad, who purchased the abandoned C&NW track. However, the costs were too high to revive railroad service, and the tracks were removed in 1988.

== Geography ==
According to the United States Census Bureau, the city has a total area of 0.66 square miles (1.71 km^{2}), of which 0.64 square miles (1.66 km^{2}) is land and 0.02 square miles (0.05 km^{2}) is water.

=== Climate ===
This climatic region is typified by large seasonal temperature differences, with warm to hot (and often humid) summers and cold (sometimes severely cold) winters. According to the Köppen Climate Classification system, Scribner has a humid continental climate, abbreviated "Dfa" on climate maps.

== Demographics ==
Historical population
Census	Pop.	Note	%±
1880	193		—
1890	664		244.0%
1900	827		24.5%
1910	891		7.7%
1920	1,021		14.6%
1930	1,066		4.4%
1940	904		−15.2%
1950	913		1.0%
1960	1,021		11.8%
1970	1,031		1.0%
1980	1,011		−1.9%
1990	950		−6.0%
2000	971		2.2%
2010	857		−11.7%
2020	843		−1.6%
U.S. Decennial Census

=== 2010 census ===
As of the census of 2010, there were 857 people, 385 households, and 223 families living in the city. The population density was 1,339.1 inhabitants per square mile (517.0/km^{2}). There were 443 housing units at an average density of 692.2 per square mile (267.3/km^{2}). The racial makeup of the city was 95.7% White, 0.5% African American, 0.8% Native American, 0.7% Asian, 0.5% from other races, and 1.9% from two or more races. Hispanic or Latino of any race were 1% of the population.

There were 385 households, of which 24.9% had children under the age of 18 living with them, 46.0% were married couples living together, 7.3% had a female householder with no husband present, 4.4% had a male householder with no wife present, and 42.3% were non-families. 39.5% of all households were made up of individuals, and 25.2% had someone living alone who was 65 years of age or older. The average household size was 2.13 and the average family size was 2.86.

The median age in the city was 50.4 years. 21.6% of residents were under the age of 18; 5.2% were between the ages of 18 and 24; 16.6% were from 25 to 44; 26.5% were from 45 to 64; and 30% were 65 years of age or older. The gender makeup of the city was 48.8% male and 51.2% female.

=== 2000 census ===
As of the census of 2000, there were 971 people, 389 households, and 245 families living in the city. The population density was 1,523.2 inhabitants per square mile (588.1/km^{2}). There were 428 housing units at an average density of 671.4 per square mile (259.2/km^{2}). The racial makeup of the city was 98.35% White, 0.31% African American, 0.10% Native American, 0.72% from other races, and 0.51% from two or more races. Hispanic or Latino of any race were 0.93% of the population.

There were 389 households, out of which 28.5% had children under the age of 18 living with them, 53.0% were married couples living together, 7.7% had a female householder with no husband present, and 37.0% were non-families. 32.4% of all households were made up of individuals, and 19.8% had someone living alone who was 65 years of age or older. The average household size was 2.31 and the average family size was 2.94.

In the town the population was spread out, with 23.3% under the age of 18, 6.7% from 18 to 24, 22.0% from 25 to 44, 17.4% from 45 to 64, and 30.6% who were 65 years of age or older. The median age was 43 years. For every 100 females, there were 79.2 males. For every 100 females age 18 and over, there were 77.8 males.

As of 2000 the median income for a household in the city was $30,455, and the median income for a family was $40,625. Males had a median income of $31,389 versus $18,553 for females. The per capita income for the city was $16,173. About 6.1% of families and 9.4% of the population were below the poverty line, including 8.6% of those under age 18 and 13.3% of those age 65 or over.

== Notable people ==
- George Dern, United States Secretary of War and Governor of Utah
- J. Martin Klotsche, educator and historian
- Gregg Olson, baseball player
