= Paul F. Clark =

American politician

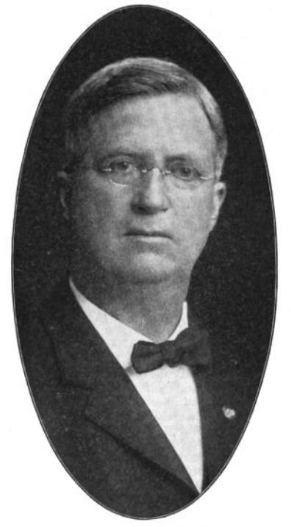

18th Speaker of the Nebraska House of Representatives
- In office January 1899 – January 1901
- Preceded by: James N. Gaffin
- Succeeded by: William G. Sears

Member of the Nebraska House of Representatives
- In office 1897–1901
- Constituency: 30th District

Personal details
- Born: Paul Fenimore Clark; July 14, 1861 Green Lake, Wisconsin
- Died: June 2, 1932 (aged 70) San Jose, California
- Party: Republican
- Spouse: May Roberts
- Education: University of Nebraska
- Occupation: Lawyer, politician

Paul Fenimore Clark (July 14, 1861 – June 2, 1932) was an American politician who was the 18th Speaker of the Nebraska House of Representatives from 1899 to 1901.

== Biography ==
Clark was born in Green Lake, Wisconsin, on July 14, 1861, the son of John Averill Clark and Laura Cornelia Pomeroy Clark. His distant relatives included William Cooper, James Fenimore Cooper and Paul Fenimore Cooper. He spent his childhood on a farm in St. Edward, Nebraska and attended the University of Nebraska. He was a member of the Masons.

After he retired around 1912, he and his wife May (née Roberts) moved to California. Clark died on June 2, 1932, in Willow Glen, San Jose, California.

== Career ==
Clark was a member of the Nebraska House of Representatives, elected in 1896 and reelected in 1898. He was chosen Speaker for the 1899 session. He was an unsuccessful candidate for U.S. Representative from Nebraska in 1912 as a fusion candidate of the Republican and Bull Moose parties.
