= Charles W. Pool =

Charles W. Pool, from the 1926 Nebraska Blue Book

Charles Wesley Pool (born Illinois, November 20, 1856; died Lincoln, Nebraska, July 5, 1930) was an American newspaper editor and politician. A Democrat, Pool served as Speaker of the Nebraska House in 1908-1909 and won four terms as Secretary of State of Nebraska (1915–1919, 1923–1927). He was also the editor and co-owner of the Johnson County Journal, based in Tecumseh, Nebraska, from 1884 to 1919.

== Early life ==
Pool was the son of Benjamin Wells Pool (1826–1869) and Dorcas Ann (Shinn) Pool Shepherd (1835–1905). His family settled near Pawnee City when he was a child. After his father's death in 1869 Pool left home; he became apprenticed to a printer in Illinois in 1874. In 1883 he returned to Nebraska and in 1884 became co-owner and editor of the Johnson County Journal.

== Political career ==
Pool was elected to the Nebraska House in 1908 from Johnson and Nemaha counties and served as speaker. In 1910 Pool was the unsuccessful Democratic and People's Independent candidate for Secretary of State, losing to Addison Wait. He filed as a candidate for governor in 1912 but withdrew in March. In 1913 he was elected as president of the Nebraska Press Association. In 1914 and 1916 he was elected Secretary of State on the Democratic ticket. In 1918 he ran unsuccessfully for Nebraska's 6th congressional district, losing to incumbent Republican Moses Kinkaid. He was once again elected Secretary of State in 1922 and 1924. He filed as a candidate in 1930 but died shortly afterwards.

== Family ==
Pool married Frances LaPorte Foster in 1883; they had no children. He is buried in Forest Lawn Memorial Park in Omaha, Nebraska.
