= John Milton Thayer =

American politician (1820–1906)

John M. Thayer
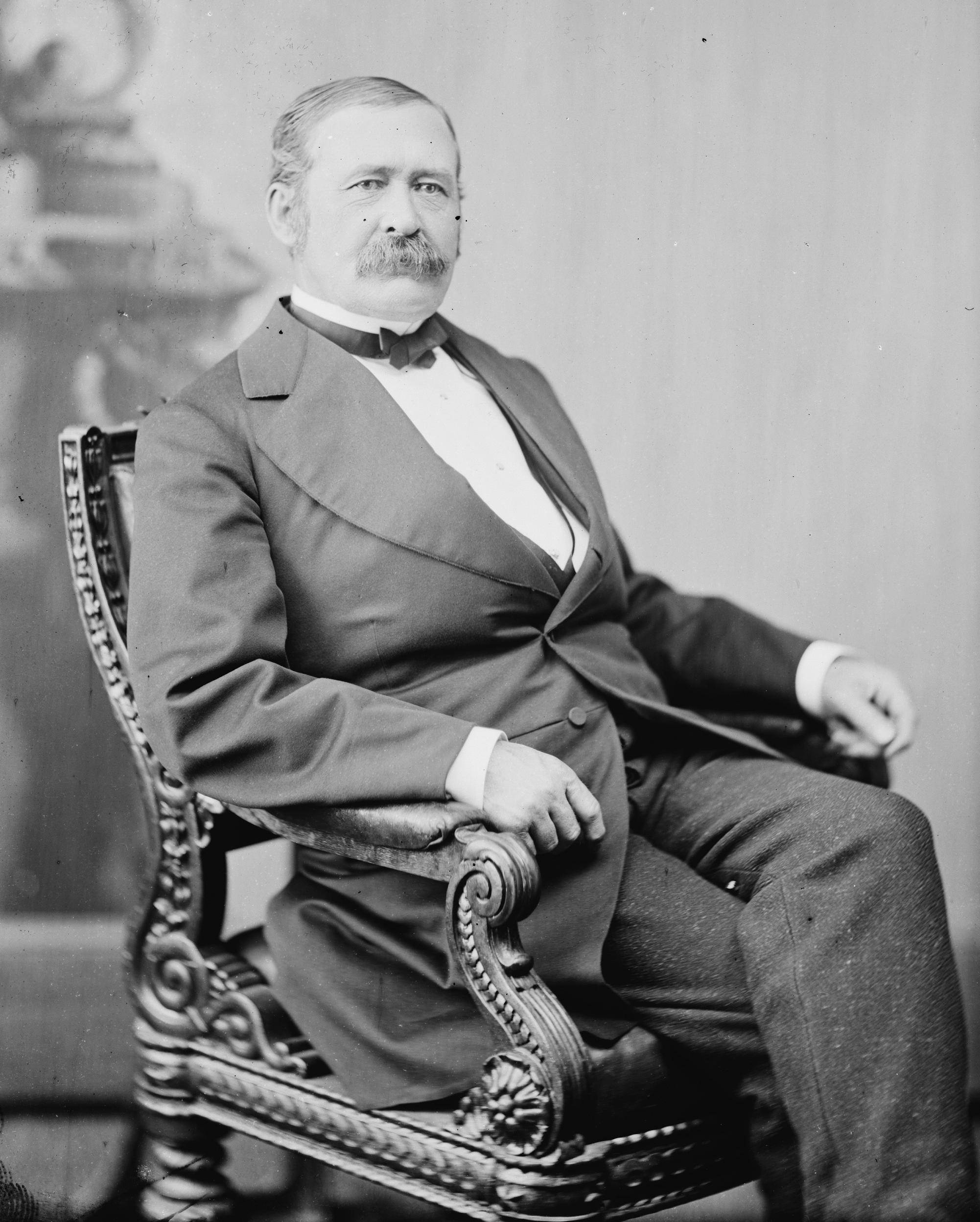
- Thayer, between 1865 and 1880

6th Governor of Nebraska
- In office January 6, 1887 – January 15, 1891
- Lieutenant: Hibbard H. Shedd; George D. Meiklejohn
- Preceded by: James W. Dawes
- Succeeded by: James E. Boyd
- In office May 5, 1891 – February 8, 1892
- Lieutenant: Thomas J. Majors
- Preceded by: James E. Boyd
- Succeeded by: James E. Boyd

2nd Governor of Wyoming Territory
- In office March 1, 1875 – April 10, 1878
- Preceded by: John Allen Campbell
- Succeeded by: John Wesley Hoyt

United States Senator from Nebraska
- In office March 1, 1867 – March 3, 1871
- Preceded by: None
- Succeeded by: Phineas W. Hitchcock

Personal details
- Born: January 24, 1820 Bellingham, Massachusetts, US
- Died: March 19, 1906 (aged 86) Lincoln, Nebraska, US
- Resting place: Wyuka Cemetery
- Party: Republican
- Relatives: Thayer family
- Education: Brown University
- Occupation: Lawyer

Military service
- Allegiance: United States
- Branch/service: United States Army; Union Army
- Years of service: 1861–1865
- Rank: Brigadier General; Brevet Major General
- Commands: 1st Nebraska Infantry; District of the Frontier; District of Eastern Arkansas
- Battles/wars: Indian Wars American Civil War: Battle of Fort Donelson; Battle of Shiloh; Battle of Chickasaw Bayou; Battle of Arkansas Post; Siege of Vicksburg; Battle of Prairie D'Ane; Battle of Jenkins' Ferry; Battle of Fort Smith

John Milton Thayer (January 24, 1820 – March 19, 1906) was a general in the Union Army during the American Civil War and later a United States senator from Nebraska, governor of Wyoming Territory, and governor of Nebraska.

== Early life ==
Thayer was born in Bellingham, Massachusetts. He attended and taught in rural schools. He graduated from Brown University in 1841, and established a practice in Worcester, Massachusetts, where he was the editor of the Worcester Magazine and the Historical Journal. He served as a lieutenant in the local militia company before deciding to move with his family to the West. He was married to Mary Torrey Allen on December 27, 1842, and they had six children.

== Career ==
Arriving in Nebraska in 1854, Thayer quickly affiliated himself with the Republican Party and actively participated in politics, as well as owning a large farm near Omaha.

In 1855 he was appointed major general of the Territorial Militia. In June of the same year, at the direction of Acting Nebraska Territorial Governor Thomas B. Cuming, he led a council with Pawnee chiefs near present-day Leshara, Nebraska. The chiefs were led by Pitalesharo, the town's namesake. Local Pawnee had conducted a series of raids on local settlers and Thayer meant to calm the situation. The general gained a reputation as an Indian fighter throughout the 1850s, eventually culminating with the so-called Pawnee War of 1859.

Thayer served as delegate to the 1860 State Constitution Convention which organized the Republican Party in the Nebraska Territory. He was elected to the Nebraska Territorial Legislature in 1860. While in the legislature, he introduced a bill to abolish slavery in Nebraska Territory.

== Civil War ==
With the outbreak of the Civil War, Thayer wrote a letter to Secretary of War Simon Cameron asking that he be allowed to raise a Nebraska regiment in response to President Abraham Lincoln's call for volunteers. He resigned his legislative seat in June 1861 to become Colonel of the 1st Nebraska Infantry Regiment, and spent the entire war fighting in the Western Theater. He commanded a brigade under Lew Wallace in the battles of Fort Donelson, Shiloh and Siege of Corinth. Promoted to brigadier general in October 1862, he led a brigade in the XV Corps. He saw action at the battles of Chickasaw Bayou and Fort Hindman and the siege of Vicksburg.

The 1st Nebraska provided support and refuge for freedom seekers escaping from enslavers. Thayer's home in Lincoln, Nebraska is listed on the National Underground Railroad Network to Freedom.

Thayer was then assigned to the cavalry and commanded the District of the Frontier with his headquarters in Fort Smith, Arkansas. He participated in the Camden Expedition and other actions in the region, seeing considerable action at the Battle of Prairie D'Ane. He commanded the rearguard of Frederick Steele's force at the Battle of Jenkins' Ferry, battling Confederate troops under Sterling Price for over four hours before forcing Price to disengage. His delaying action enabled Steele to successfully extricate his army to safety.

In February 1865, Thayer was relieved of command of Fort Smith and sent to the smaller post at St. Charles, Arkansas, with a regiment of Kansas cavalry and a single artillery battery. However, with the omnibus promotions of leading generals at the close of the war, Thayer was brevetted major general of volunteers in 1865.

== Postbellum career ==
After the Civil War, Thayer served as a member of the 1866 State Constitutional Convention. Upon the admission of Nebraska into the Union as a state, he was elected as one of its first two United States senators. He served as a member of the Senate from 1867 to 1871, when he was unsuccessful in winning reelection.

President Ulysses S. Grant appointed Thayer Governor of the Territory of Wyoming in February 1875 and he took the oath of office March 1, 1875. His service ended on May 29, 1878, and he returned to Nebraska to resume his law practice.

In 1886, Thayer secured the Republican gubernatorial nomination and was elected Governor of Nebraska by popular vote. He served two full terms as Governor of Nebraska, from 1887 to 1892. He was the sixth governor of Nebraska.

After James E. Boyd won the 1890 Nebraska gubernatorial election, Thayer, who was not a candidate in the 1890 election, challenged Boyd's citizenship, and thus his eligibility to be governor. This delayed Boyd's inauguration until January 15. Boyd took office as governor; however, he only served until May 5, 1891, because the Supreme Court of Nebraska ruled that Boyd was ineligible to be governor, and thus Thayer took office again on May 5. Boyd took his case, Boyd v. Nebraska ex rel. Thayer, to the United States Supreme Court, and it was argued on December 8, 1891. On February 1, 1892, the Supreme Court of the United States ruled that Boyd was eligible, and thus he took the office back from Thayer on February 8, 1892, and served out the remainder of his term. Thayer then retired from public life to follow literary pursuits.

== Death and legacy ==
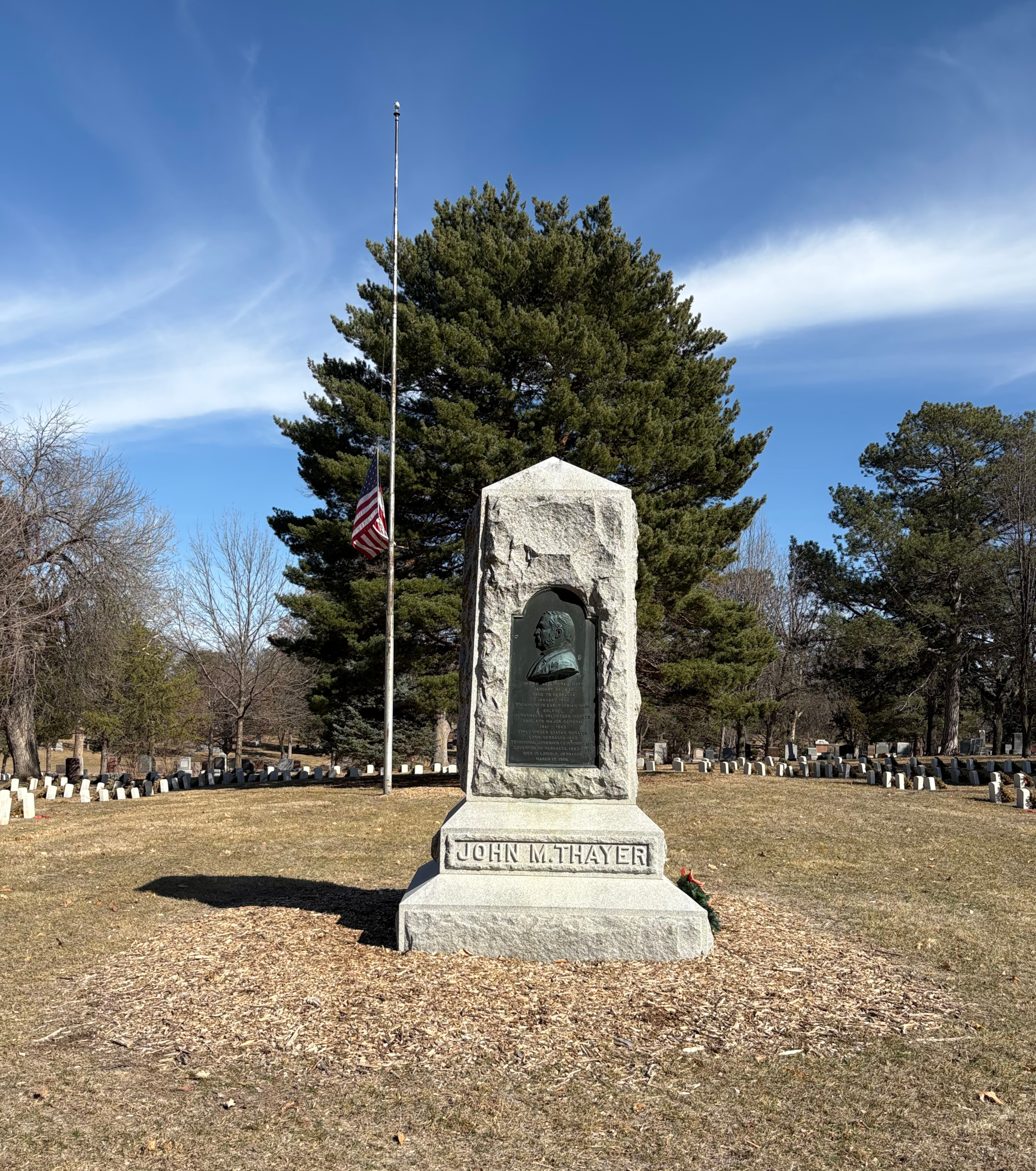
Thayer's grave at Wyuka Cemetery

John M. Thayer died at his home in Lincoln, Nebraska on March 19, 1906, and was buried in Wyuka Cemetery.

Thayer County, Nebraska, is named for Thayer. A bust of Thayer is located on the grounds of the Vicksburg National Military Park in Mississippi. The bust was erected in May 1915 and was sculpted by T.A.R. Kitson.

== See also ==
- List of American Civil War generals (Union)

Party political offices
Preceded by James W. Dawes	Republican nominee for Governor of Nebraska; 1886, 1888	Succeeded by Lucius D. Richards
U.S. Senate
Preceded by None	U.S. senator (Class 2) from Nebraska; 1867–1871; Served alongside: Thomas W. Tipton	Succeeded by Phineas W. Hitchcock
Political offices
Preceded by John Allen Campbell	Governor of Wyoming Territory; 1875–1878	Succeeded by John Wesley Hoyt
Preceded by James W. Dawes	Governor of Nebraska; 1887–1892	Succeeded by James E. Boyd
