= Thomas Tipton =

American politician

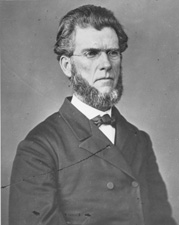

United States Senator from Nebraska
- In office March 1, 1867 – March 3, 1875
- Succeeded by: Algernon S. Paddock

Member of the Pennsylvania House of Representatives
- In office 1845

Personal details
- Born: August 5, 1817 Cadiz, Ohio, U.S.
- Died: November 26, 1899 (aged 82) Washington, D.C., U.S.
- Resting place: Rock Creek Cemetery; Washington, D.C., U.S.
- Education: Allegheny College; Madison College

Military service
- Branch/service: Union Army
- Years of service: 1861-1865
- Unit: 1st Regiment Nebraska Volunteer Infantry
- Battles/wars: American Civil War

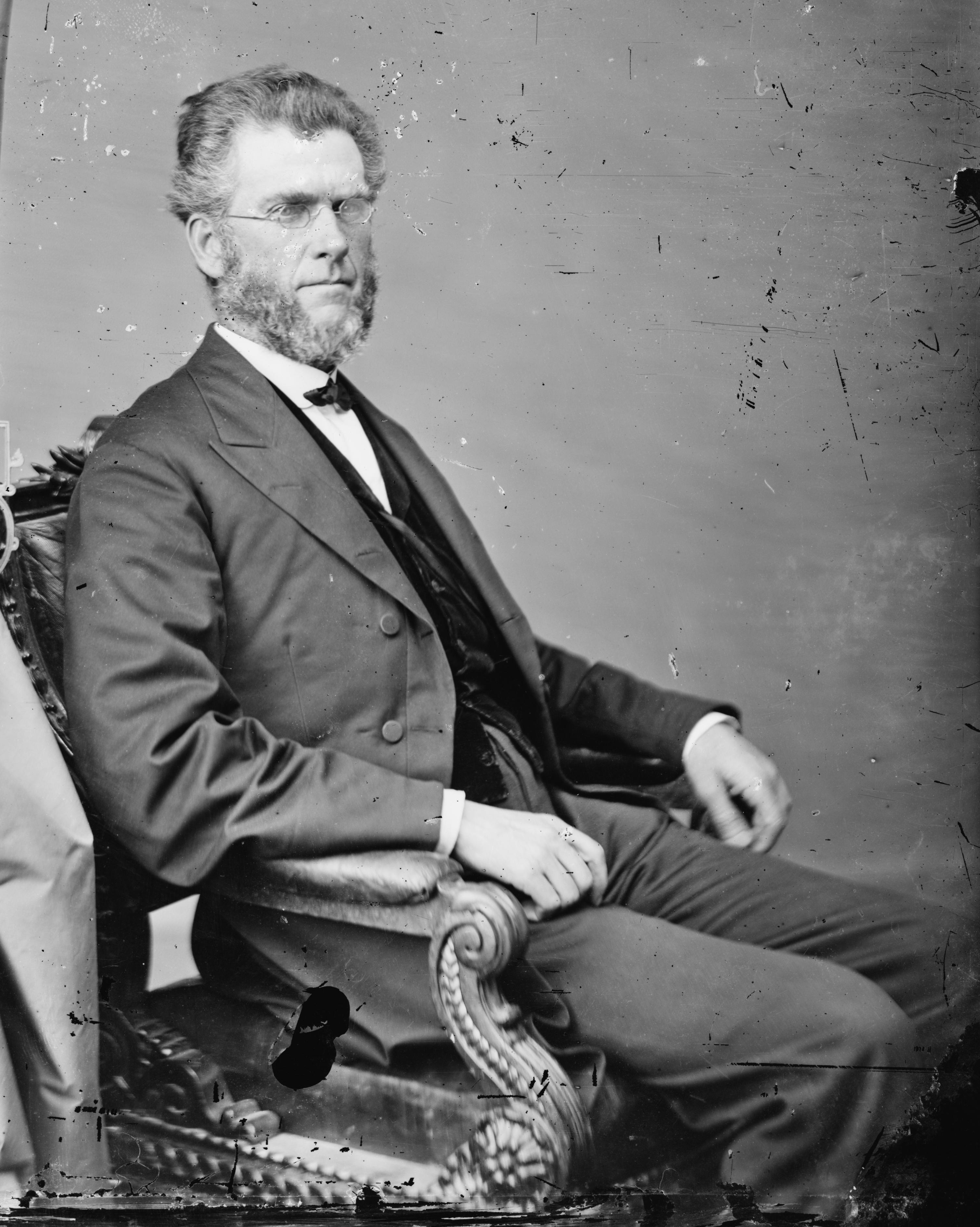
Thomas Tipton

Thomas Weston Tipton (August 5, 1817 – November 26, 1899) was a Senator from Nebraska.

== Biography ==
Tipton was born in Cadiz, Ohio, and attended Allegheny College, Meadville, Pennsylvania. He pursued classical studies and graduated from Madison College, Pennsylvania, in 1840. He studied law and was admitted to the bar in 1844. He was a member of the Pennsylvania House of Representatives in 1845. He was appointed to a position in the United States Land Office from 1849 to 1852; he then resumed the practice of law in McConnelsville, Ohio, in 1853. He was ordained a minister of the Methodist Episcopal Church in 1856. Around 1859, he moved to Brownville, Nebraska and joined the Congregational Church. He was a member of the 1859 Nebraska constitutional convention and the Nebraska Territory council in 1860.

During the American Civil War, Tipton was appointed chaplain of the First Regiment, Nebraska Volunteer Infantry 1861–1865. He was the assessor of internal revenue for Nebraska in 1865, and a member of the State constitutional convention in 1867. Upon the admission of Nebraska as a State into the Union, he was elected as a Republican to the United States Senate in 1867. Tipton was reelected in 1869 and served from March 1, 1867, to March 3, 1875.

"Tipton looks the Radical all over, but doesn't always act it," a Washington correspondent wrote in 1868. "There is not another man in the Senate whose appearance goes so far to make up the beau ideal of unpolished earnestness. Full six feet in height, straight as an arrow, with long brown hair combed back from his forehead till it touches his coat collar, a pair of eyes that never look, but always glare or stare, and seem ready to jump from their sockets through the gold-rimmed spectacles in front of them, when their owner gets excited, which occurs every time he speaks in debate; a low forehead, a sharp nose and a mouth and chin which tell of bull-dog courage and determination, these, and the matter and manner of his speeches in the Senate, remind the student of history of what might have been the leader of the Barebones Parliament two hundred years ago."

Tipton had been elected as a Republican and voted for the conviction of President Andrew Johnson in the 1868 impeachment trial. By 1872, however, he had fallen out of favor with the Grant Administration and became a strong critic of the president's policies. Endorsing the Liberal Republican movement and favoring Horace Greeley for president that year, he effectively read himself out of the party.

After that, he resumed the practice of law and was an unsuccessful Democratic candidate for Governor of Nebraska in the election of 1880. He died in Washington, D.C., November 26, 1899, and was interred in Rock Creek Cemetery.

Party political offices
| Preceded by William H. Webster | Democratic nominee for Governor of Nebraska; 1880 | Succeeded by Julius Sterling Morton |
U.S. Senate
| Preceded by None | U.S. senator (Class 1) from Nebraska; 1867–1875; Served alongside: John M. Thayer, Phineas W. Hitchcock | Succeeded by Algernon S. Paddock |
