= List of speakers of the Nebraska House of Representatives =

The speaker of the Nebraska House of Representatives was an office in the Nebraska Legislature which existed from 1855 to 1936 when Nebraska had a bicameral legislature. This office was created when the Nebraska Territory was first established and remained after Nebraska became a state. When Nebraska voters adopted a unicameral legislature beginning in 1937, this office ceased to exist and was replaced by a single speaker of the Nebraska Legislature.

== Speakers of the Nebraska Territorial House of Representatives ==
The lower house of the Nebraska Territorial Legislature was called the Nebraska Territorial House of Representatives, and its presiding officer was called a speaker. Twelve individuals are officially recognized as having served as speaker of the Nebraska Territorial House of Representatives during its twelve sessions before Nebraska became a state. However, the office was briefly split when a faction of the Nebraska Territorial Legislature broke off from the meeting at Omaha, Nebraska, and convened at Florence, Nebraska, in January 1858.

# (Note: This is also the number of the legislative session.)	Name	Session start	Session end	County of residence	Party (Note: Party affiliations during the time each individual served as speaker are listed here when known.)	Notes
1	Andrew J. Hanscom	Jan 16, 1855	Mar 16, 1855	Douglas		
2	Potter C. Sullivan	Dec 18, 1855	Jan 26, 1856	Washington		
3	Isaac L. Gibbs	Jan 5, 1857	Feb 18, 1857	Otoe		
4	James H. Decker	Dec 8, 1857	Jan 16, 1858	Otoe		Departed with the majority faction that went to Florence, Nebraska, and remained speaker of that contingent.
–	J. Sterling Morton	Jan 7, 1858	Jan 7, 1858	Otoe	Dem	Speaker pro tempore of the minority faction that remained at Omaha.
–	Andrew J. Poppleton	Jan 8, 1858	Jan 16, 1858	Douglas	Dem	Speaker pro tempore of the minority faction that remained at Omaha. Later served as the mayor of Omaha, Nebraska.
5	Hiram P. Bennet	Sep 21, 1858	Nov 4, 1858	Otoe	Rep	
6	Silas A. Strickland	Dec 5, 1859	Jan 13, 1860	Sarpy	Dem	
7	Henry W. DePuy	Dec 3, 1860	Jan 11, 1861	Washington	Rep	
8	Alfred D. Jones	Dec 2, 1861	Jan 10, 1862	Douglas		
9	George B. Lake	Jan 7, 1864 (Note: No session was held in 1863.)	Feb 15, 1864	Douglas	Rep	Later served as a Nebraska Supreme Court justice
10	Samuel M. Kirkpatrick	Jan 5, 1865	Feb 13, 1865	Cass	Rep	
11	James G. Megeath	Jan 4, 1866	Feb 12, 1866	Douglas	Dem	
12	William F. Chapin	Jan 10, 1867	Feb 18, 1867	Cass	Rep	Later served as the second speaker of the House of Representatives and as mayor of Lincoln, Nebraska

== Speakers of the Nebraska House of Representatives ==
After Nebraska became a state in 1867, the lower house of the Nebraska Legislature continued to be called the Nebraska House of Representatives as the successor to the Territorial House of Representatives. The Nebraska Constitution of 1866 briefly mentioned the presiding officer of this chamber, again called the speaker of the House of Representatives. The Nebraska Constitution of 1875 likewise mentioned the office of speaker of the House of Representatives. The speaker of the Nebraska House of Representatives was third in line to become governor after the lieutenant governor and the president pro tempore of the Senate. This office was abolished after 1936 when Nebraska adopted a unicameral legislature, and its title was transferred to the newly created office of speaker of the Nebraska Legislature.

#	Name	Tenure	Place of residence	Party	Notes
1	William A. Pollock	1866	Brownville	Rep	
2	William F. Chapin	1867–1868	Cass County	Rep	Previously served as the last speaker of the Territorial House of Representatives; later served as mayor of Lincoln, Nebraska
3	William McLennan	1869–1870	Otoe County	Rep	
4	George W. Collins	1871–1872	Pawnee City	Rep	
5	Milan H. Sessions	1873–1874	Lancaster County	Rep	
6	Edward S. Towle	1875–1876	Falls City	Rep	
7	Albinus Nance	1877–1878	Osceola	Rep	Later served as Governor of Nebraska
8	Charles P. Mathewson	1879–1880	Norfolk	Rep	
9	Hibbard H. Shedd	1881–1882	Ashland	Rep	Later served as Nebraska Lieutenant Governor
10	George M. Humphrey	1883–1884	Pawnee City	Rep	
11	Allen W. Field	1885–1886	Lincoln	Rep	
12	Nathan V. Harlan	1887–1888	York	Rep	
13	John C. Watson	1889–1890	Nebraska City	Rep	Later served as president pro tempore of the Nebraska Senate
14	Samuel M. Elder	1891–1892	Clay Center	Fus	
15	James N. Gaffin	1893–1894	Colon	Fus	Later served as the 17th speaker
16	Charles L. Richards	1895–1896	Hebron	Rep	
17	James N. Gaffin	1897–1898	Colon	Fus	Previously served as the 15th speaker
18	Paul F. Clark	1899–1900	Lincoln	Rep	
19	Willis G. Sears	1901–1902	Tekamah	Rep	
20	John H. Mockett Jr.	1903–1904	Lincoln	Rep	
21	George L. Rouse	1905–1906	Alda	Rep	
22	Daniel M. Nettleton	1907–1908	Spring Ranch	Rep	
23	Charles W. Pool	1909–1910	Tecumseh	Dem	Later served as Nebraska Secretary of State
24	John Kuhl	1911–1912	Randolph	Dem	
25	Peter C. Kelley	1913–1914	Grand Island	Dem	
26	George W. Jackson	1915–1918	Nelson	Dem	
27	Dwight S. Dalbey	1919–1920	Beatrice	Rep	
28	Walter L. Anderson	1921–1922	Lincoln	Rep	
29	Albert N. Mathers	1923–1924	Gering	Rep	
30	Allen G. Burke	1925–1926	Bancroft	Rep	
31	James A. Rodman	1927–1928	Omaha	Rep	
32	Bern R. Coulter	1929–1930	Bridgeport	Rep	
33	Samuel Max Kier	1931–1932	Lincoln	Rep	
34	George W. O'Malley	1933–1934	Greeley	Dem	
35	William H. O'Gara	1935–1936	Laurel	Dem	

== See also ==
- List of Nebraska state legislatures
