= Boyd v. Nebraska ex rel. Thayer =

- Supreme Court of the United States

Decided February 1, 1892
- Full case name: Boyd v. Nebraska ex rel. Thayer
- Citations: 143 U.S. 135 (more)

Holding
- James E. Boyd was a United States citizen.

Court membership
- Chief Justice Melville Fuller Associate Justices Stephen J. Field · John M. Harlan; Horace Gray · Samuel Blatchford; Lucius Q. C. Lamar II · David J. Brewer; Henry B. Brown

Case opinions
- Majority: Fuller (regarding citizenship and jurisdiction)
- Plurality: Fuller (citizenship reasoning 1), joined by Blatchford, Lamar, Brewer (Note: The opinion does not state whether these justices supported reasoning 2, so they may have. In that case, reasoning 2 would have a majority.)
- Plurality: Fuller (citizenship reasoning 2), joined by Harlan, Gray, Brown
- Dissent: Field

Boyd v. Nebraska ex rel. Thayer, 143 U.S. 135 (1892), was a United States Supreme Court case in which the court held that James E. Boyd was a United States citizen. The case determined that Boyd was the proper Governor of Nebraska and unseated John Milton Thayer, who had accused Boyd of not being a United States citizen based on claimed immigration defects related to Boyd's father.

== Background ==
James E. Boyd was born in Ireland, of Irish parents, in 1834, and brought to this country in 1844 by his father, Joseph Boyd, who settled at Zanesville, Ohio, and on March 5, 1849, declared his intention to become a citizen of the United States. In 1855, James E. Boyd, who had grown up in the full belief of his father's citizenship, and had been assured by him that he had completed his naturalization by taking out his second papers in 1854, voted in Ohio as a citizen.

In August 1856, Boyd relocated to Nebraska Territory. In 1857, he was elected and served as county clerk of Douglas County. In 1864 he was sworn into the military service, and served as a soldier of the federal government in battles against Native Americans. In 1866, he was elected a member of the Nebraska legislature and served one session. In 1871 and again in 1885, he was elected a member of the convention to draft the Nebraska Constitution, and served as such. In 1880, he was elected and acted as president of the city council of Omaha. In 1881, Boyd was elected mayor of Omaha, and he was reelected in 1885. In other words, Boyd had been acting as a citizen of the United States, the territory, and then the state of Nebraska for 30 years.

In 1890, Boyd was elected Governor of Nebraska. He was due to be sworn in as the governor on January 8, 1891, but outgoing Governor John Milton Thayer, who was not a candidate in the 1890 election, challenged Boyd's citizenship and thus his eligibility to be governor. This delayed Boyd's inauguration until January 15. Boyd took office as governor; however, he only served until May 5, 1891, because the Supreme Court of Nebraska ruled that Boyd was ineligible to be governor, and thus Thayer took office again on May 5.

== Opinion of the court ==
The case was argued on December 8, 1891. The Supreme Court issued an opinion on February 1, 1892. In an opinion by Chief Justice Melville Fuller, the court held that Boyd was a citizen. Before fully explaining, the court recounted Boyd's life and highlighted that he had relocated to Nebraska Territory very early and experienced "years of extreme hardship on the frontier." The court said that "The policy which sought the development of the country by inviting to participation in all the rights, privileges, and immunities of citizenship those who would engage in the labors and endure the trials of frontier life, which has so vastly contributed to the unexampled progress of the nation, justifies the application of a liberal, rather than a technical, rule in the solution of the question before us."

The Supreme Court provided two rationales for why Boyd was a citizen. First, they said that he acquired inchoate citizenship as a child when his father declared his intent to become a citizen. When a child with an inchoate citizenship became an adult before their parent actually completed the naturalization process, the child retained that inchoate citizenship and was entitled to accept it. Considering that Boyd had continued to live in the United States and had taken numerous oaths requiring citizenship, the court held that he was a citizen.

Second, the court noted the 1822 case Blight v. Rochester, in which the court held that an official naturalization record was not necessary for a jury to infer proper naturalization when there was evidence that the person could have become a citizen, voted many times, held office, and exercised rights belonging to citizens. Thus, Boyd's father was a naturalized citizen under the version of the facts used to challenge Boyd's citizenship. When Boyd's father became a citizen while Boyd was a child, Boyd became a citizen. Justices Harlan, Gray, and Brown noted that they only endorsed this reasoning.

All but one of the justices, Stephen J. Field, agreed that the court had jurisdiction to decide the case. Because Field did not agree, he dissented.

== Subsequent developments ==
Boyd took office again on February 8, 1892 and served out the remainder of his term.
