= Nickerson, Nebraska =

- Village
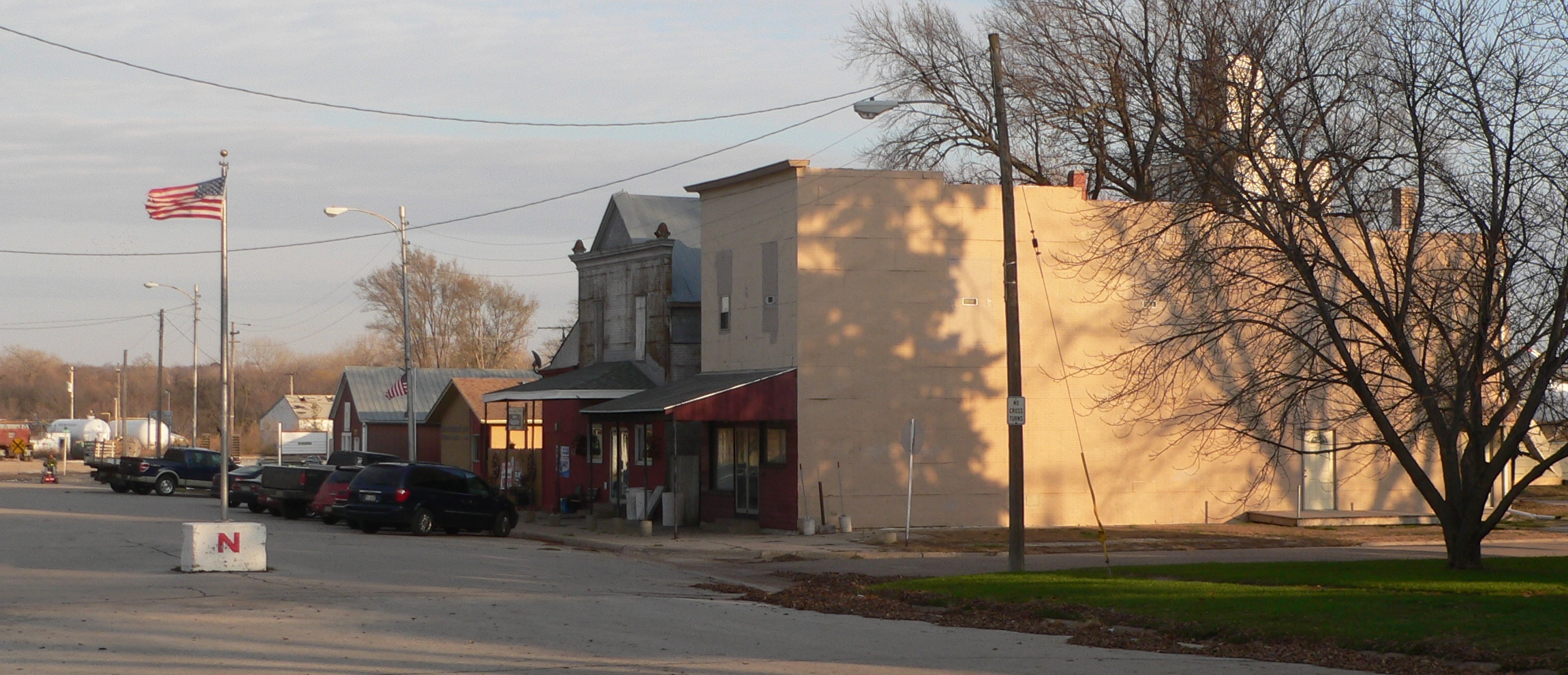
- Downtown Nickerson

- Location of Nickerson, Nebraska

- Location within Nebraska Location within the United States
- Coordinates: 41°32′06″N 96°28′15″W
- Country: United States
- State: Nebraska
- County: Dodge
- Township: Nickerson

Area
  - Total: 0.38 sq mi (0.99 km^{2})
  - Land: 0.38 sq mi (0.98 km^{2})
  - Water: 0.0039 sq mi (0.01 km^{2})
- Elevation: 1,204 ft (367 m)

Population (2020)
  - Total: 312
  - Density: 821.9/sq mi (317.33/km^{2})
- Time zone: UTC-6 (Central (CST))
  - Summer (DST): UTC-5 (CDT)
- ZIP code: 68044
- Area code: 402
- FIPS code: 31-34300
- GNIS feature ID: 2399497

Nickerson is a village in Dodge County, Nebraska, United States. As of the 2020 census, Nickerson had a population of 312.

== History ==
Nickerson was platted in 1871 by Lucius D. Richards when the Fremont, Elkhorn & Missouri Valley Railroad was extended to that point. It was named for its founder, Reynolds K. Nickerson. Nickerson was incorporated as a village in 1910.

In 1906, a second railroad began to serve the village. The Chicago, Burlington & Quincy Railroad tracks were constructed. Those tracks are now a part of the BNSF Railway network.

By the 1970s, the Chicago & North Western Railroad was running fewer trains through Nickerson, bringing into question the future of that railroads service to the village. However, flooding in the spring of 1982 would damage both the C&NW tracks & the Burlington Northern tracks. While the BN tracks would be repaired, the C&NW decided to ultimately end service & abandon their line. The abandoned tracks were taken over in 1985 by the newly-formed Fremont & Elkhorn Valley Railroad, who brought tourists into town. Unfortunately, FEVR ended operations in 2012 & the tracks were removed in 2021.

== Geography ==
According to the United States Census Bureau, the village has a total area of 0.38 square miles (0.98 km^{2}), all land.

== Demographics ==
Historical population
Census	Pop.	Note	%±
1920	141		—
1930	183		29.8%
1940	159		−13.1%
1950	140		−11.9%
1960	168		20.0%
1970	214		27.4%
1980	254		18.7%
1990	291		14.6%
2000	431		48.1%
2010	369		−14.4%
2020	312		−15.4%
U.S. Decennial Census

=== 2010 census ===
As of the census of 2010, there were 369 people, 129 households, and 91 families residing in the village. The population density was 971.1 inhabitants per square mile (374.9/km^{2}). There were 143 housing units at an average density of 376.3 per square mile (145.3/km^{2}). The racial makeup of the village was 79.7% White, 0.5% African American, 0.3% Native American, 14.9% from other races, and 4.6% from two or more races. Hispanic or Latino of any race were 24.7% of the population.

There were 129 households, of which 37.2% had children under the age of 18 living with them, 48.8% were married couples living together, 16.3% had a female householder with no husband present, 5.4% had a male householder with no wife present, and 29.5% were non-families. 17.8% of all households were made up of individuals, and 9.3% had someone living alone who was 65 years of age or older. The average household size was 2.86 and the average family size was 3.32.

The median age in the village was 33.9 years. 27.1% of residents were under the age of 18; 11.3% were between the ages of 18 and 24; 29.8% were from 25 to 44; 22.3% were from 45 to 64; and 9.5% were 65 years of age or older. The gender makeup of the village was 50.7% male and 49.3% female.

=== 2000 census ===
As of the census of 2000, there were 431 people, 144 households, and 110 families residing in the village. The population density was 1,131.5 inhabitants per square mile (436.9/km^{2}). There were 155 housing units at an average density of 406.9 per square mile (157.1/km^{2}). The racial makeup of the village was 83.76% White, 0.70% African American, 12.76% from other races, and 2.78% from two or more races. Hispanic or Latino of any race were 22.51% of the population.

There were 144 households, out of which 45.8% had children under the age of 18 living with them, 56.9% were married couples living together, 15.3% had a female householder with no husband present, and 23.6% were non-families. 18.8% of all households were made up of individuals, and 10.4% had someone living alone who was 65 years of age or older. The average household size was 2.99 and the average family size was 3.34.

In the village, the population was spread out, with 34.8% under the age of 18, 9.5% from 18 to 24, 31.8% from 25 to 44, 14.4% from 45 to 64, and 9.5% who were 65 years of age or older. The median age was 28 years. For every 100 females, there were 92.4 males. For every 100 females age 18 and over, there were 86.1 males.

As of 2000 the median income for a household in the village was $36,477, and the median income for a family was $39,688. Males had a median income of $29,531 versus $20,769 for females. The per capita income for the village was $12,744. About 8.7% of families and 12.0% of the population were below the poverty line, including 11.7% of those under age 18 and 8.9% of those age 65 or over.
