= James Megeath =

American pioneer and politician (1824–1906)

James Gabriel Megeath

11th Speaker of the Nebraska Territorial House of Representatives
- In office January 4, 1866 – February 12, 1866
- Preceded by: Samuel M. Kirkpatrick
- Succeeded by: William F. Chapin

Personal details
- Born: November 18, 1824 Loudoun County, Virginia
- Died: November 9, 1906 (aged 81) Salt Lake City, Utah

James Gabriel Megeath (November 18, 1824 – November 9, 1906) was a pioneer in Omaha, Nebraska who is known for his helping found Hanscom Park, to which Megeath donated substantially.

== Biography ==
Megeath was from Virginia, and was descended from one of the early families of the state. He was born at the home of his maternal grandfather. His father was Joseph Pritchett Megeath who was born in 1800 in the same county and reared on the farm of his father Gabriel Megeath who lived and died in that county. As he neared adulthood, Joseph Pritchett Megeath left the parental farm and was engaged for some time in trading operating teams as far away as Ohio. Afterward, he engaged in general merchandising, owning and operating a farm for about twenty years, after which he retired and died at Philomont Loudoun county, Virginia in 1857. James G Megeath's mother was Elizabeth Cochran who was also born in Loudoun county. Virginia in 1803. She was a daughter of James Cochran who lived for many years in that county.

James G Megeath could not secure living accommodations in that city and was compelled to cross the river to Council Bluffs. He remained in the latter city all winter but voted in Omaha on the day of his arrival from the East. He returned to Virginia in 1855 but two years later he again went to Omaha which was his home until his death. In the latter year he purchased a one third interest in the general merchandise business of Megeath & Co which had a store for a time on the south side of Farnam street a few doors east of 14th and later on the north side of Farnam upon the site of the present Megeath building.

Megeath subsequently sold out his general merchandise business and embarked as the head of a company in the commission and forwarding business operating from the changing terminus of the Union Pacific Railroad until the latter road made its connection with the Central Pacific at Monument Point. This company did an enormous business. It handled 90 percent of the freight of the Union Pacific to be forwarded.

Megeath early acquired large real estate interests in Omaha which was the means of greatly augmenting his large fortune. For a number of years on account of ill health he led a life of quiet retirement but during later years he was engaged in the active real estate business In 1872 he joined with Andrew J Hanscom in deeding to the city the property now known as Hanscom park comprising 57 acres (230,000 m^{2}) of natural park land the gift being conditioned solely upon its being retained for park purposes by the city and being improved to the extent of $25,000.

Megeath and Peter E Her many years ago bought the McCoy distillery and with it formed what has since become the Willow Springs distillery property. After a few years however Mr Megeath disposed of his interest to the Hers. In 1860 he was a member of the city council. In 1866 he was speaker of representatives and during the same year was a member of the state senate at the special called for the election of two United States. He was also a member of the board of commissioners in the same year and in 1877 reelected to membership in the city council. In all of these responsible positions he rendered intelligent and effective service. He was an active democrat all his life. From the year 1848 he was an active member of the Masonic order and was the very early members of Capitol Lodge No organized in Omaha in 1857.

== Personal life ==
In 1854 in Fauquier, Virginia, he was married to Miss Virginia Carter. She was daughter of George Carter and granddaughter of Ambrose Walden, who was a lieutenant in the American Revolutionary War. Mrs. Megeath was born in 1833 in Fauquier county and died in 1898. The issue of this union included Mrs. Beatty Robinson, wife of Major E.B. Robinson, 9th United States infantry born in Virginia in 1853, George Windsor born in Virginia in 1856, Joseph P born in Nebraska in 1857 and Samuel A born in Baltimore in 1870.

== Death ==
Megeath died at the home of his son Joseph P in Salt Lake City in 1906.

== See also ==
- History of Omaha
