= Boyd's Theater and Opera House =

- Interactive map of Boyd's Theater and Opera House
- Address: 1621 Harney Street; Omaha, Nebraska; United States
- Coordinates: 41.25655°N 95.93747°W
- Owner: James E. Boyd, later Burgess-Nash Co.
- Capacity: 2,000
- Type: Theater and Opera House

Construction
- Opened: September 3, 1891
- Closed: February 2, 1920
- Years active: 1891–1920

Boyd's Theater and Opera House was a theater and opera house at 1621 Harney Street in Downtown Omaha, Nebraska. It was demolished in 1920 and the property redeveloped for the then owner's department store business.

== History ==
The first Boyd's Opera House in Omaha was built in 1881 at 15th and Farnam Streets by James E. Boyd. In addition to serving as Nebraska's governor and Omaha's mayor, Boyd was a successful railroad and real estate developer. One of the first celebrities to appear at the original Boyd's was Oscar Wilde in 1882. After the original Boyd Opera House burned twelve years later, Boyd built his new 2,000-seat theater and opera house at 17th and Harney Streets.

The new five story theater was constructed on an iron framework with a pressed red brick exterior. There was retail space on the street level, and office space within the interior. The total cost of construction and furnishings was $250,000. The Boyd Theater's stage was 78 feet wide, 40 feet deep and 60 feet high. The curtain drops were 26 feet by 46 feet. The proscenium was modeled after an ornate arch in the Taj Mahal. The theater was decorated in tones of sage green and soft tones of olive to complement the electric lighting throughout.

There were 17 full sets of scenery when the theater opened on September 3, 1891. The first play presented on the house's stage was Alabama, with Thomas F. Boyd as the theater's manager. One particularly elaborate production of Henry V required the theater to accommodate 10 train cars of armour, 200 trunks of costumes, 167 professional actors and 21 full sets. Once local actors were added to the production, the cast ultimately rose to 300. The Boyd Theater was capable of handling even productions of this size.

Some of the most prominent actors of the time appeared on the Boyd Theater's stage. English Shakespearean actors Sir Henry Irving and Dame Ellen Terry appeared twice in Omaha. The first time was April 20 and 21, 1900 with the productions of Merchant of Venice, Nance Oldfield and The Bells. Their second appearances occurred on December 31, 1901, and January 1, 1902. Other toasted performers to grace Boyd Theater's stage included: Otis Skinner, E. H. Sothern, John Drew, Walker Whiteside, Robert B. Mantell Joseph Jefferson, Leslie Carter, Julia Marlowe, Ethel Barrymore and Maude Adams.

A man bled to death in the wings of the Boyd Theater during one performance, with no one in the audience the wiser. A song and dance man, Jim Mulligan, died after being stabbed by Arthur Sprague, a stage manager, after making an offensive comment about Mrs. Sprague.

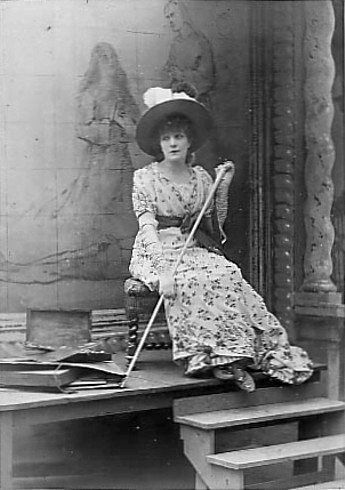
Sarah Bernhardt in La Tosca, circa 1887

In 1905, Sarah Bernhardt appeared on the Boyd Theater stage in La Tosca. Bernhardt traveled with her own custom railway car. Also traveling with her on the train was her own carriage, a team of black horses, and a French coachman and hostler. The entire city knew when Bernhardt was in town.

Omaha-born pianist Frances Nash, who would later marry Edwin Watson, friend and senior advisor to President Franklin D. Roosevelt, often performed at Boyd's Theater.

The man primarily responsible for the quality and the variety of the shows appearing on the Boyd Theater's stage was William J. Burgess. Burgess had been involved in theaters since the age of 12. He initially came to Omaha to manage the Grand Opera House and later managed the original Boyd Theater. When the Creighton Orpheum Theater opened, he served as its manager for two years. Once that theater joined the Orpheum Circuit, he took over the management of the second Boyd Theater and set about making it the premier live theater venue in Omaha. He introduced the first mail-order tickets in town and strived to book the premier acts. He even opened an acting school for fledgling dramatists. But even Burgess's efforts could not sway the audiences changing tastes towards motion pictures and the rising costs of mounting a live stage production.

In 1914, Boyd's Theater was sold to the Burgess-Nash Company for $231,000. Initially they continued to manage it as a theater, but as the competition from talking movies increased, the company eventually closed the theater. The last performance in the theater was on February 2, 1920. It was demolished in 1920 and the property redeveloped for their department store business. Currently, the property houses the Omaha Public Power District's downtown office.
