= 1882 Texas lieutenant gubernatorial election =

- November 7, 1882
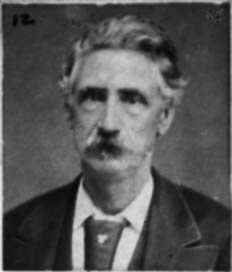

Nominee	Francis Marion Martin	E. W. Morton	Andrew Young
Party	Democratic	Independent	Independent
Alliance		Republican	Greenback
Popular vote	171,277	58,504	19,220
Percentage	68.79%	23.50%	7.72%
Lieutenant Governor before election
Leonidas Jefferson Storey
Democratic
Elected Lieutenant Governor
Francis Marion Martin
Democratic

The 1882 Texas lieutenant gubernatorial election was held on November 7, 1882, in order to elect the lieutenant governor of Texas. Democratic candidate Francis Marion Martin defeated independent candidates E. W. Morton and Andrew Young.

== General election ==
The incumbent lieutenant governor, Leonidas J. Storey, did not run for reelection. There were several candidates running to replace him at the Democratic Party Convention. After two days of voting, state senator Francis Marion Martin was selected as the nominee. Storey was put forward as a candidate for state senator, but in a contested convention withdrew his candidacy in favor of George Pfeuffer.

At the time, Texas was a part of the "Solid South" and the Democratic party was overwhelmingly favored in state elections. The previous couple of elections had split opposition support between the Republican and Greenback parties. In an attempt to improve their odds at success a strategy of electoral fusionism was attempted and both parties endorsed the independent campaign of congressman and former lieutenant governor George Washington Jones for governor.

However, the support for fusionism did not necessarily extend to down ballot races and both the Republican and Greenback parties ended up endorsing separate slates of tickets for nominally independent campaigns. Sometimes these disagreements resulted in the tickets nominating the same person for different offices. This was the case in the race for lieutenant governor as the Greenback endorsed candidate, Dr. Andrew Young, appeared on the Republican backed ticket as the candidate for the Commissioner of the General Land Office. There was speculation that either Young or the Republican endorsed candidate Col. E. W. Morton would drop out, but neither did.

=== Candidates ===
- Benjamin Marbry Baker, state representative from Panola County (Democrat) (withdrawn)
- John T. Coffee, lawyer, colonel in the confederate army, former speaker of the Missouri House of Representatives (Democrat) (withdrawn)
- Francis Marion Martin, state senator, delegate at the state constitutional convention of 1875, captain in the CSA cavalry (Democrat)
- Colonel E. W. Morton (Note: Sources spell his name as both "Morton" and "Morten".) (Independent, with support from the Republicans)
- Finis E. Piner, lawyer and former state senator (Democrat) (withdrawn)
- Tillman Smith, former state senator and state representative (Democrat) (withdrawn)
- Dr. Andrew Young (Independent, with support of the Greenbacks)

=== Results ===
Texas lieutenant gubernatorial election, 1882
Party	Candidate	Votes	%	±%
Democratic	Francis Marion Martin	171,277	68.79	▲4.02
Independent	E. W. Morton	58,504	23.50	N/A
Independent	Andrew Young (Note: In the results canvassed by the Legislature, Andrew Young's vote total also includes "scattering".)	19,220	7.72	N/A
Total votes		266,514	100.00	
Democratic hold				
