= Hibbard H. Shedd =

American politician

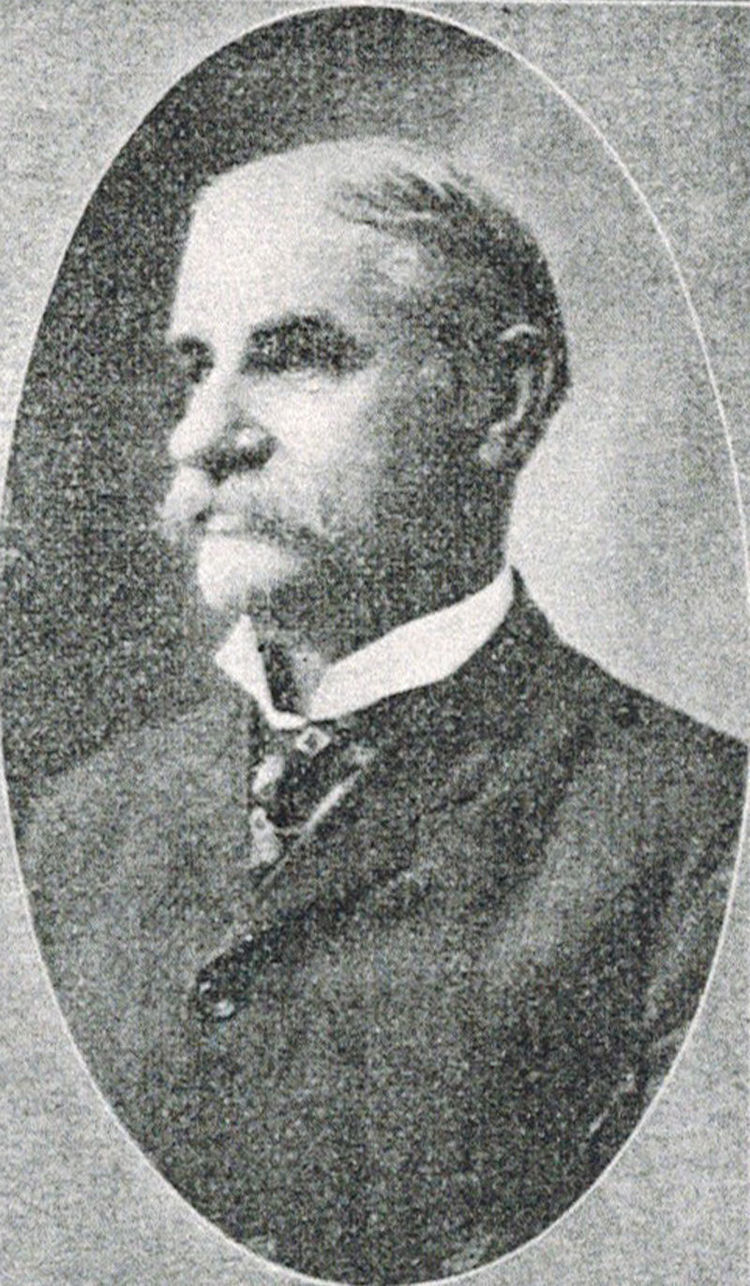

4th Lieutenant Governor of Nebraska
- In office 1885–1889
- Governor: James W. Dawes; John Milton Thayer
- Preceded by: Alfred W. Agee
- Succeeded by: George de Rue Meiklejohn

9th Speaker of the Nebraska House of Representatives
- In office January 1881 – January 1883
- Preceded by: Charles P. Mathewson
- Succeeded by: George M. Humphrey

Personal details
- Born: January 27, 1847 Denmark, Iowa
- Died: October 6, 1905 (aged 58)
- Party: Republican
- Spouse: Katharine Lee Graves

Hibbard Houston Shedd (January 27, 1847 – October 6, 1905) was an American politician who served as the fourth lieutenant governor of Nebraska from 1885 to 1889.

Shedd was born in Denmark, Iowa in 1847, the only son of George Shedd, a medical doctor, and Abigail Houston. In 1864 he joined the army and fought in the American Civil War as a part of the 45th Regiment Iowa Volunteer Infantry. In 1871, he moved to Ashland, Nebraska. He was a member of the Nebraska constitutional convention in 1875, and became Speaker of the Nebraska House in 1881. In 1885, he was elected lieutenant governor, and served for two terms.

Shedd married Katharine Lee Graves in 1874, and had six children. Shedd died on October 6, 1905.

Shedd's son George Clifford Shedd became a novelist, whose works included The Incorrigible Dukane.

Political offices
Preceded by Alfred W. Agee	Lieutenant Governor of Nebraska; 1885 – 1889	Succeeded by George de Rue Meiklejohn
