= William F. Chapin =

American politician from Nebraska (1831-1885)

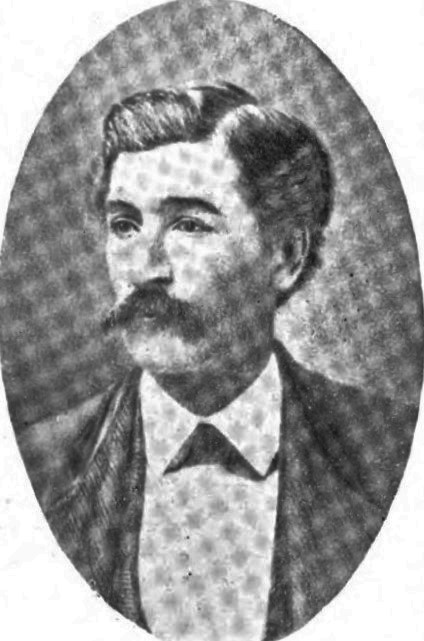

1st Mayor of Lincoln
- In office April 4, 1871 – April 10, 1872
- Preceded by: Charles Henry Gere (as Chairman)
- Succeeded by: Erastus E. Brown

2nd Speaker of the Nebraska House of Representatives
- In office 1867–1868
- Preceded by: William A. Pollock
- Succeeded by: William McLennan

12th Speaker of the Nebraska Territorial House of Representatives
- In office January 19, 1867 – February 18, 1867
- Preceded by: James G. Megeath
- Succeeded by: Position abolished

Member of the Nebraska Legislature and Nebraska Territorial Legislature
- In office 1859–1869

Personal details
- Born: May 22, 1831 Butternuts, New York, U.S.
- Died: November 14, 1885 (aged 54) Grand Island, Nebraska, U.S.
- Party: Republican
- Children: 3

William Franklin Chapin (May 22, 1831 – November 14, 1885) was an American politician who served as the first Mayor of Lincoln, Nebraska as a member of the Republican party from April 4, 1871, to April 10, 1872, as well as serving in the Nebraska Legislature, including being its speaker.

== Early life ==
Chapin was born on May 22, 1831, in Butternuts, New York. He moved to Rock Bluff, Nebraska in October 1856, where he married Margaret J. Young in January 1858. The couple had three children. During this time, Chapin was working as a farmer, a teacher in Lexington and a lawyer after he was admitted to the bar of Nebraska in 1857.

== Political career ==
Chapin first ran for office for the Nebraska Legislature in 1858, but failed to get elected. He tried again in 1859, this time succeeding. Ultimately he became the Speaker of Nebraska Territory House of Representatives in 1866, serving until 1869 when he retired from the Legislature. Upon his retirement, Chapin moved to Lincoln where he was elected as the first Mayor of the city on April 4, 1871. He served in this position until April 10, 1872, when he ran for the Republican nomination for the 1872 Nebraska gubernatorial election, losing the primary to Robert Wilkinson Furnas by a few votes.

== Death ==
Chapin retired from politics following his primary loss and died in Grand Island, Nebraska on November 14, 1885, aged 54.

Political offices
Preceded by Charles Henry Gere	1st Mayor of Lincoln; 1871-1872	Succeeded by Erastus E. Brown
