= John Holbrook Powers =

American pioneer (1831–1918)

Personal details
- Born: September 10, 1831 Madison County, Illinois, U.S.
- Died: May 15, 1918 (aged 86) Trenton, Nebraska, U.S.
- Spouse(s): Helen Rhoda Greenlees (m. 1856; died 1868) Elizabeth Ellen Deffenbaugh (died)
- Children: 12
- Occupation: Politician; educator

John Holbrook Powers (September 10, 1831 – May 15, 1918), who was known as "Honest John," was a Nebraska pioneer who ran for governor as a populist in 1892.

== Early life ==
John Holbrook Powers was born on September 10, 1831, in Madison County, Illinois.

== Career ==
As a young man, Powers took up teaching the youth to shoot during the winters and instructed in chorus and choir. He fought in the Union Army in the Civil War. In Kentucky, he developed pneumonia and was honorably discharged. In 1884, he joined the Farmers' Alliance and published its Alliance Manual. This affiliation led to his nomination as the People's Party candidate for the Governor of Nebraska in 1892. Of the three candidates, Powers received the most votes, but after a long and bitter fight, James E. Boyd, the Democrat, was declared elected. In his History of Nebraska, James Olson described Powers as "a modest man who lived in a sod house on his homestead in Hitchcock County." In 1895, he was appointed by Governor Silas A. Holcomb as labor commissioner. He was an adjutant at Grand Island Soldiers home for two terms.

Powers was a Presbyterian and was licensed in 1892 by the church in Hastings, Nebraska, to preach as a lay evangelist. He was later licensed by the church in Kearney. He later joined a church in Trenton. He was a deacon of the church up until his death.

== Personal life ==
Powers married Helen Rhoda Greenlees in 1856 in LaSalle County, Illinois. They had five children, including Nancy R., Lucy A., Amy J. His wife died in 1868. Powers married Mrs. Elizabeth Ellen Deffenbaugh. They had seven children, including John A., George H., Charles F., Aaron L. and Edward S. His second wife died around 1909. Robert B. Crosby, the Republican governor of Nebraska from 1954 to 1955, was John Powers' great grandson.

Powers died on May 15, 1918, in Trenton.

Party political offices
| First | Populist nominee for Governor of Nebraska; 1890 | Succeeded by Charles Van Wyck |
