= George W. Woodbey =

American minister (1854–1937)

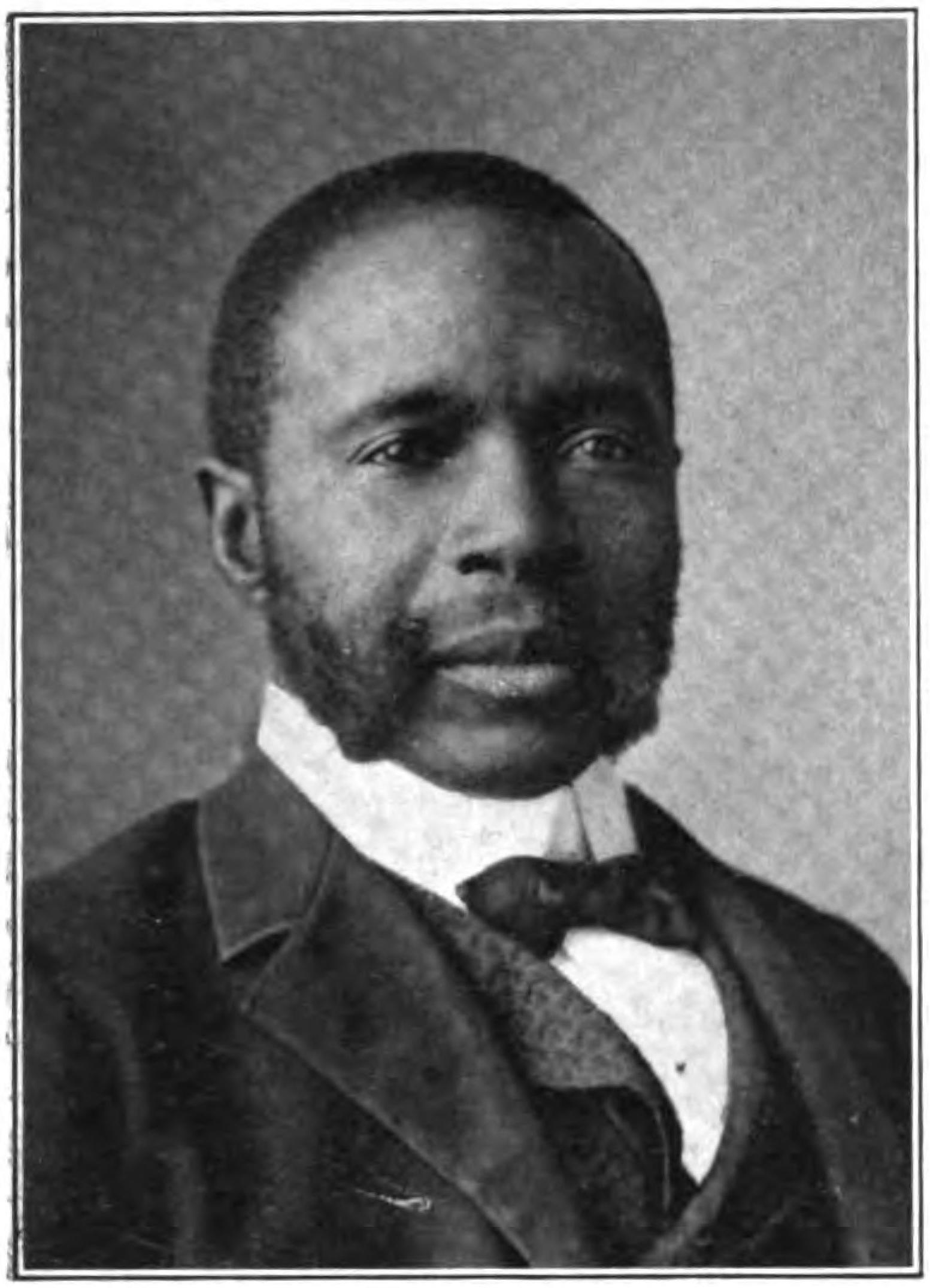
- Woodbey c. 1908
- Born: George Washington Woodbey; October 5, 1854; Johnson County, Tennessee, U.S.
- Died: August 27, 1937 (aged 82); Los Angeles, California, U.S.
- Occupations: Author, minister
- Political party: Republican; Prohibition; Socialist

George Washington Woodbey (October 5, 1854 – August 27, 1937) was an influential African-American minister, author and Socialist. He wrote several influential papers about Socialism and African Americans, ministered in churches in the Midwestern United States and California, and served as the sole Black delegate to the Socialist Party of America conventions in 1904 and 1908.

== Early life ==
George Washington Woodbey was born into slavery in Johnson County, Tennessee, on October 5, 1854, to Charles Woodbey and Rachel Wagner. He learned how to read after being freed from slavery and was mostly self-educated, but attended common school for some time. He was ordained as a Baptist minister in Emporia, Kansas, in 1874 He ministered in churches in Nebraska, Kansas and Missouri.

== Politics ==
In Missouri and Kansas, Woodbey was active in the Republican. He joined the Prohibition Party and moved to Nebraska, where he was a Prohibitionist candidate for lieutenant governor and U.S. Congress. In 1896, he read Edward Bellamy's Looking Backward and became a subscriber to Appeal to Reason.

During the 1900 presidential election he joined the Populists and supported William Jennings Bryan for president. He saw speeches by Eugene Debs during the campaign. The Democrats invited Woodbey to deliver speeches, but then cut him off as he was too strongly socialist.

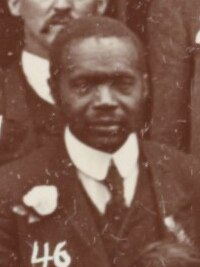
Woodbey at the first Socialist Party of America convention in Chicago, 1904

Woodbey became a member of the Socialist Party. He never took the Socialist Party to task on the question of race, even after his own nomination for vice presidential candidate was met with only one vote. Woodbey believed the Socialist Party could help solve racial problems in the United States because of its emphasis on economic changes to the system. Woodbey also saw the struggle for socialism as an extension of the struggle against slavery: as the Civil War had ended chattel slavery, so would the replacement of capitalism with socialism abolish wage slavery. Woodbey directly compared the means of repression used to discipline slaves and the working class, stating: "In the days of chattel slavery the masters had a patrol force to keep the negroes in their place and protect the interests of the masters. Today the capitalists use the police for the same purpose".

At the 1904 and 1908 SPA national conventions Woodbey was the only black delegate and spoke on the floor a total of six times, two in 1904 and four in 1908. Ellis Jones nominated Woodbey for vice-president in 1908, but Jones was the only person that voted for him. In 1912, Woodbey was a delegate to the national convention and the Socialist nominee for California State Treasurer.

Woodbey also noted the emergence of class stratification among the black community, and expressed skepticism regarding relying on upper-class black leadership in the fight against racism, noting that whilst many believed "the accumulation of wealth in the hands of a few Negroes will solve this problem... a few white men have all the wealth and the rest of their brothers are getting poorer every day". Like Eugene Debs, he was also notable for his opposition to the anti-immigrant sentiments that were commonplace in the American labor movement and the Socialist Party at the time.

He promoted the causes of socialism across California and was recognized as one of the great socialist orators of the time. His ability to bring his message to the common man made him a reputation on the streets. On one occasion, Woodbey was denied access to a restaurant due to his race. He turned the situation around by putting together a successful boycott of the restaurant and hotel with the help of socialist comrades.

In 1902 Woodbey moved to San Diego, where he was pastor of Mt. Zion Baptist Church. He served on the executive board of the Socialist Party of California, and traveled around the state in his work. He believed that the socialist message of helping the poor was consistent with his Christian beliefs.

Because of the inflammatory nature of his message, Woodbey was in and out of jail for several years. In 1905, after one particular incident, the police hospitalized the orator. He organized a protest and went to the county jail to lodge a formal complaint. His complaint was met by being physically thrown from the building. Woodbey would then press charges of assault and battery on the officer. The case was taken to court and a jury found the defendant not guilty. The verdict was not what Woodbey was looking for, but it gave him an unexpected boost with the community. The event also allowed him to demonize the police as shills for the capitalist machine.

On January 8, 1912, the city council of San Diego passed legislation prohibiting street-corner meetings, including religious ones, within a district of 49 blocks in the center of town claiming that these were blocking traffic. The Industrial Workers of the World stated that this was an attempt to suppress them. Two days before the new rules went into effect the IWW and other socialists, including Woodbey, held a meeting in the center of the restricted area, but were broken up by the police.

== Later life ==
According to Philip Foner, there is no record of Woodbey or his activities after 1915; however, an article by Woodbey was printed in a Chicago publication in 1909. He was said to have been active in California as late as 1923.

Woodbey died in Los Angeles, California on August 27, 1937, at the home of his son William, survived by his third wife and three children.

Reverend George W. Slater, Jr. credited Woodbey for his conversion and understanding of Socialism. Slater took the mantle of Socialism from Woodbey and continued to teach and preach his message as a disciple of the Socialist movement.

== Beliefs ==
The over-all equality between people in the socialist system is something that ties racial issues very close to socialism. Woodbey felt that a system of total equality would have helped African-Americans to obtain the freedoms and justice that they were denied. Woodbey argued that at the time of publication, socialism was going through a period of agitation in which many intelligent socialists were spreading the ideals and goals of socialism to create more socialists. He predicted that socialism would grow tremendously and influence governments all over the world.

He describes a socialist government as needing very few laws. He argues that with equal ownership and concern for society's production, men would no longer be swayed to illegal acts for monetary gain. He proposes a system in which any citizen can propose a law, and with enough support (he suggests 5% of the population) the law would be presented for vote. If a majority were in support of it, it would become a law. Woodbey does not mention or distinguish between State and Federal government in this section. Giving each worker equal interest and shareholding in the industries in which they work creates less demand for bosses and management chains, thereby creating more laborers. Woodbey envisions a society in which, given these parameters, the majority would vote in favor of equal distribution of goods to all citizens given that all citizens are equal owners. He also envisions a severe drop in all criminal activity, and a schooling system that prepares men and women for their positions in specific industries. With equal opportunities among the people, the differences between people would disappear and rid the society of prejudice. Any citizen who does not follow the laws passed by the majority of voters would be forced to go without a living.

== Works ==
- The Bible and Socialism: A Conversation Between Two Preachers. San Diego, CA: G.W. Woodbey, 1904.
- The Distribution of Wealth. San Diego, CA: G.W. Woodbey, 1910.
- Why the Negro Should Vote the Socialist Ticket. Chicago: Socialist Party of America, n.d. [1910s].
- Method of Procedure in Baptist Church Trials. Nashville, TN: National Baptist Pub. Board, 1916.

== Works cited ==
- Foner, Philip S. (1976). "Reverend George Washington Woodbey: Early Twentieth Century California Black Socialist". The Journal of Negro History. 61 (2): 136–157. doi:10.2307/2717267. ISSN 0022-2992. JSTOR 2717267.
- Foner, Philip (1977). American Socialism and Black Americans: From The Age of Jackson to World War II. Greenwood Publishing Group. ISBN 0837195454.
- Foner, Philip S. (1983). Black Socialist Preacher: The Teachings of Reverend George Washington Woodbey and His Disciple, Reverend G.W. Slater, Jr. Synthesis Publications. ISBN 978-0-89935-025-7.
