= Alfred W. Agee =

American politician (1850–1938)

3rd Lieutenant Governor of Nebraska
- In office 1883–1885
- Governor: James W. Dawes
- Preceded by: Edmund C. Carns
- Succeeded by: Hibbard H. Shedd

Personal details
- Born: November 18, 1850 Morgan County, Tennessee, US
- Died: October 4, 1938 (aged 87) Ogden, Utah, US
- Party: Republican
- Spouse(s): Lilla "Lillie" Eugenia Victoria (Gordon)(1855-1912), Clara Louise (Gordon)

Alfred Whitman Agee (November 18, 1850 – October 4, 1938) was the third lieutenant governor of Nebraska, serving from 1883 to 1885 while James W. Dawes was governor.

Agee was born in Morgan County, Tennessee, to Alfred and Catharine A. Agee. He moved with his parents to Pike County, Indiana, around 1861, as his father was an anti-slavery minister who wanted to move to a free state. Agee remained in Indiana until 1872. He spent some time in Illinois and also studied law, and ended up settling in Aurora, Nebraska, in 1874, and was admitted to the bar. He was elected Nebraska Lieutenant Governor in the fall of 1882, and served one two-year term (1883–1885). He subsequently served in the Nebraska legislature.

Agee later moved to Utah in 1897 as the legal representative of Union Pacific Railroad and practiced law. He also served as a judge there.

Political offices
Preceded by Edmund C. Carns	Lieutenant Governor of Nebraska; 1883 – 1885	Succeeded by Hibbard H. Shedd
