= James W. Dawes =

American politician (1844–1918)

James William Dawes
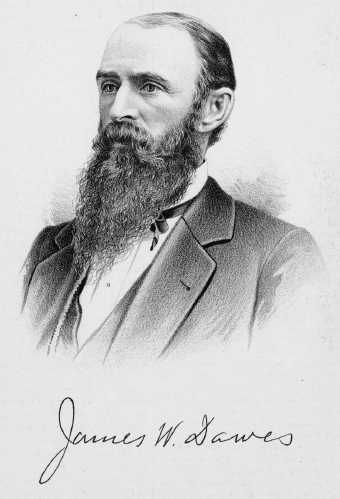

5th Governor of Nebraska
- In office January 4, 1883 – January 6, 1887
- Lieutenant: Alfred W. Agee (1883–1885); Hibbard H. Shedd (1885–1887)
- Preceded by: Albinus Nance
- Succeeded by: John M. Thayer

Member of the Nebraska Senate
- In office 1877

Personal details
- Born: January 8, 1845 McConnelsville, Ohio
- Died: October 8, 1918 (aged 73) Milwaukee, Wisconsin
- Resting place: Forest Home Cemetery
- Party: Republican
- Spouse: Francis Anna Dawes

James William Dawes (January 8, 1845 – October 8, 1918) was a Republican state politician. He served as the fifth governor of Nebraska from 1883 to 1887.

He was born in McConnelsville, Ohio. He was the great-grandson of William Dawes, a first cousin of Rufus R. Dawes, and a first cousin once removed of Charles G. Dawes.

Dawes attended Western Reserve Academy in Ohio and The Milwaukee Business College. He studied law in his cousin's law firm and was admitted to the bar in 1871. Dawes married his cousin, Francis Anna Dawes, in 1871. She died in 1909.

== Career ==
After relocating to Crete, Nebraska, Dawes worked in the mercantile business and opened a law practice. He was a delegate to the State Constitutional Convention in 1875 and a member of Nebraska State Senate in 1877. Dawes was a chairman of the Republican State Central Committee from 1876 to 1882.

Dawes was elected Governor of Nebraska in 1882, and was reelected to a second term in 1884. He later served as paymaster for the United States Army, working in Cuba and the Philippines.

Dawes served on the Doane College board of trustees for thirty-seven years.

== Death ==
Dawes died on October 8, 1918, at the age of seventy-three, in Milwaukee, Wisconsin. He is interred at Forest Home Cemetery, Milwaukee, Wisconsin.

== Legacy ==
Dawes County, Nebraska was named in Dawes' honor.

Between 1885 and 1890, Dawes' portrait was painted in Omaha by artist Herbert A. Collins.

== See also ==
- List of governors of Nebraska

Party political offices
Preceded by Albinus Nance	Republican nominee for Governor of Nebraska; 1882, 1884	Succeeded by John Milton Thayer
Political offices
Preceded by Albinus Nance	Governor of Nebraska; 1883–1887	Succeeded by John Milton Thayer
