= Albinus Nance =

American politician (1848–1911)

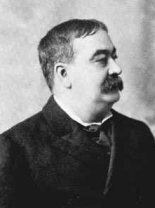

4th Governor of Nebraska
- In office January 9, 1879 – January 4, 1883
- Lieutenant: Edmund C. Carns
- Preceded by: Silas Garber
- Succeeded by: James W. Dawes

7th Speaker of the Nebraska House of Representatives
- In office January 1877 – January 1879
- Preceded by: Edward S. Towle
- Succeeded by: Charles P. Mathewson

Member of the Nebraska House of Representatives
- In office 1875–1879

Personal details
- Born: March 30, 1848 La Fayette, Illinois, US
- Died: December 7, 1911 (aged 63) Lincoln, Nebraska, US
- Resting place: Wyuka Cemetery
- Party: Republican
- Spouse: Sarah White

Albinus Roberts Nance (March 30, 1848 – December 7, 1911) was an American politician. He served as a soldier during the American Civil War, and as the fourth governor of Nebraska.

Nance was born in La Fayette, Illinois on March 30, 1848. He was born to Dr. Hiram Nance and Sarah (Smith) Nance. He was educated in Kewanee, Illinois, until age sixteen. He married Sarah White and they had one child.

== Career ==
At age sixteen, Nance enlisted with the 9th Illinois Cavalry. Nance fought in the American Civil War, from 1861 to 1865. He served as a private during the war. He fought in the battles of Hurricane Creek, Guntown, Columbia, Spring Hill, Franklin, and Nashville. He was slightly wounded during the Battle of Nashville. In 1865, after the war was over, Nance became a student at Knox College. In 1870, he was admitted to the bar in Illinois.

== Political career ==
Nance moved to Nebraska in 1871 to homestead and practice law, eventually settling in Osceola, Nebraska. He divided his time between farming and his law practice. He soon gave up farming, for his law practice and large real estate business. In 1874, Nance was nominated by the state Republican Party to run for the Nebraska House of Representatives. During his election, in 1875, Nance married Sarah White. He won the election and served as a member of the Nebraska Legislature from 1875 to 1878, and served as the Speaker of the Nebraska House of Representatives from 1877 to 1878. Nance was also a delegate to the Republican National Convention in 1876.

In 1878, while Speaker of the Nebraska House of Representatives, Nance was elected Governor of Nebraska. He was only thirty years old at the time of his election, and was known as "the boy governor". Nance and his administration were very popular with the people. His administration was described in The Public Men of Today in 1882, "The distinguishing feature of his administration has been an unassuming but inflexible determination to execute the laws with fidelity to the best interests of the people of Nebraska." Nance was renominated for the governorship, in 1880. He won the election, with an overwhelming majority.

He is known for calling in the Nebraska state militia to subdue the strikers in the Camp Dump Strike; one striker was killed by the militia.

== Death ==
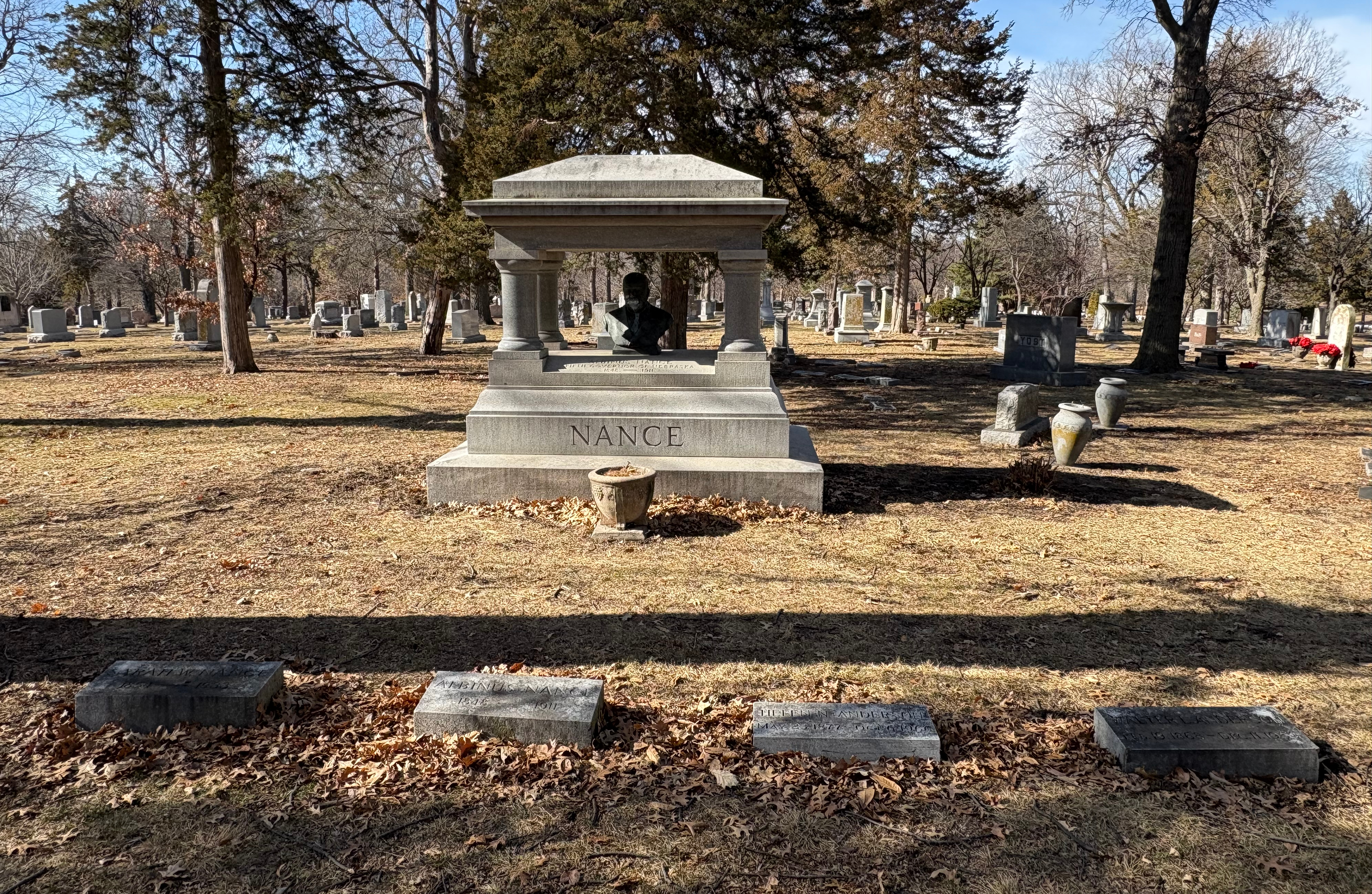
Nance's grave at Wyuka Cemetery

After being governor, Nance retired to civilian life. He owned large parts of numerous banks. He eventually retired altogether from business life. Nance died in Chicago on December 7, 1911, and was buried at Wyuka Cemetery in Lincoln. Nance County, Nebraska is named after him.

== See also ==
- List of governors of Nebraska

Party political offices
| Preceded by Silas Garber | Republican nominee for Governor of Nebraska; 1878, 1880 | Succeeded by James W. Dawes |
Political offices
| Preceded by Silas Garber | Governor of Nebraska; 1879 – 1883 | Succeeded by James W. Dawes |
