= 1866 Nebraska gubernatorial election =

- June 2, 1866

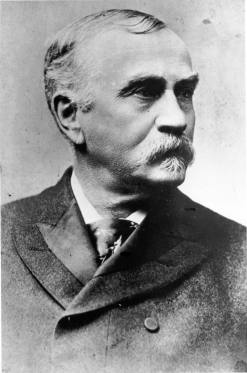
Nominee	David Butler	J. Sterling Morton
Party	Republican	Democratic
Popular vote	4,093	3,948
Percentage	50.77%	48.97%
- County results Butler: 50–60% 60–70% 70–80% 80–90% >90% Morton: 50–60% 60–70% 70–80% 80–90% No votes
Governor before election
Alvin Saunders (Territorial)
Republican
Elected Governor
David Butler
Republican

The 1866 Nebraska gubernatorial election was held on June 2, 1866, before Nebraska officially became a state. The Nebraska Constitution of 1866 specified that "the first election for Governor... shall be held on the second day of June, one thousand eight hundred and sixty-six" in order to prepare for statehood. This election featured Republican nominee David Butler defeating Democratic nominee J. Sterling Morton to become the first Governor of the State of Nebraska.

== General election ==
=== Candidates ===
- David Butler, Republican candidate
- J. Sterling Morton, Democratic candidate

=== Results ===
Nebraska gubernatorial election, 1866
Party	Candidate	Votes	%
Republican	David Butler	4,093	50.77%
Democratic	J. Sterling Morton	3,948	48.97%
Scattering		21	
Total votes		8,062	100.0%

== Aftermath ==
Although this election took place on June 2, 1866, Nebraska did not officially become a state until March 1, 1867. This meant that all officeholders elected under the Nebraska Constitution of 1866, including governor-elect David Butler, did not take office until after the transition period on March 27, 1867.
