= Edmund C. Carns =

American politician

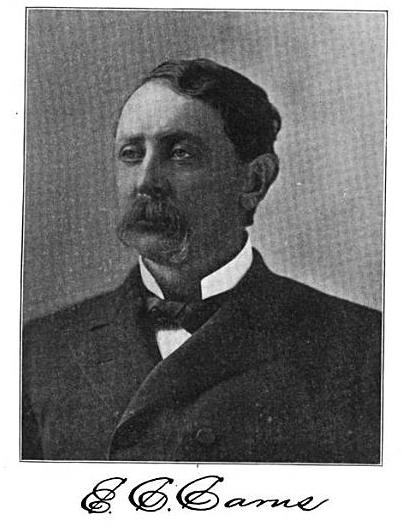

2nd Lieutenant Governor of Nebraska
- In office 1879–1883
- Governor: Albinus Nance
- Preceded by: Othman A. Abbott
- Succeeded by: Alfred W. Agee

Member of the Nebraska Senate
- In office 1876

Personal details
- Born: February 19, 1844 Butler County, Pennsylvania
- Died: March 22, 1895 (aged 51)
- Spouse: Margaret Jane Burke
- Children: 6

Edmund Crawford Carns (February 19, 1844 – March 12, 1895) was the second lieutenant governor of Nebraska, United States, serving from 1879 to 1883 while Albinus Nance was Governor. He was first elected state senator in 1876.

== Early life ==
Edmund received an academic education from Witherspoon Institute. During the Civil War, he enlisted under the 1st Minnesota Regiment and served until the end of the war as a sergeant. In 1873, he moved to Nebraska after living in several other states, including Illinois, Minnesota and California.
