= James E. Boyd (politician) =

American politician (1834–1906)

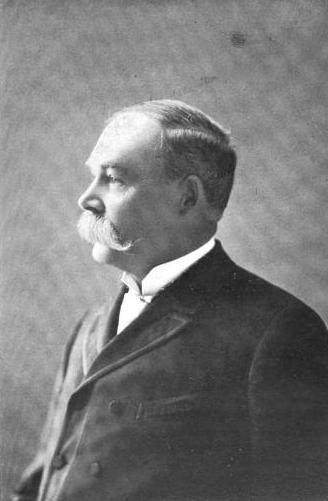

7th Governor of Nebraska
- In office January 15, 1891 – May 5, 1891
- Lieutenant: Thomas J. Majors
- Preceded by: John Milton Thayer
- Succeeded by: John Milton Thayer
- In office February 8, 1892 – January 13, 1893
- Lieutenant: Thomas J. Majors
- Preceded by: John Milton Thayer
- Succeeded by: Lorenzo Crounse

Member of the Nebraska House of Representatives
- In office 1866

Personal details
- Born: September 9, 1834 County Tyrone, Ireland
- Died: April 30, 1906 (aged 71) Omaha, Nebraska, U.S.
- Resting place: Forest Lawn Memorial Park
- Party: Democratic

James Edward Boyd (September 9, 1834 – April 30, 1906) was an Irish-born American businessman and politician in early Omaha, Nebraska. The founder of Boyd's Packing House and Boyd's Theater and Opera House, he served as the mayor of Omaha from 1881 to 1883 and from 1885 to 1887, and as the seventh governor of the state of Nebraska in 1891 and from 1892 – 1893.

== Early life ==
Boyd was born in County Tyrone, Ireland, on September 9, 1834. He moved to Belmont County, Ohio, with his family in 1844. His education was in the common schools. As he grew older, James and his brother, Joseph Boyd, managed the Boyd Ranch just west of Gibbon, Nebraska, and eventually married Anna Henry, an army doctor stationed at Fort Kearny, on August 22, 1858. The Boyd ranch served as a stopping point for travelers moving out west along the Oregon and Mormon Trails.

Travelers who had tired or worn out horses or oxen could trade for well-rested animals capable of pulling the large wagons across the Nebraska Prairie. As the Ranch business started to plummet Joseph sold his share of the ranching enterprise to James who then invested in 24 mule teams and other pieces of equipment to start a freight business. Among the first freight brought out from Missouri was lumber for a new ranch house built—between 1864 and 1868—at the Trails and Rails Museum today. In addition to his two previous business enterprises which made the Boyd Ranch well known across the state and country, James secured a contract with the Union Pacific to build 300 miles of track. As a result of this contract, the James Boyd family became very wealthy and lead to his involvement in many more business endeavors.

== Career ==
After a move to Omaha, Nebraska Territory, in 1856, he continued to support himself with his carpentry. A member of the Democratic Party, Boyd served in the Nebraska House of Representatives in 1866.

In 1881, Boyd built Boyd's Opera House at 15th and Farnam Streets in Downtown Omaha. When the building burned in 1891, Boyd quickly rebuilt a new 2,000-seat theater and opera house at 17th and Harney Streets. The new five-story structure, Boyd's Theater and Opera House, opened to the public on September 3, 1891. Until it was demolished in 1920, it hosted some of the most celebrated actors of the stage.

Boyd was mayor of Omaha, Nebraska, from 1881 to 1883, and from 1885 to 1887. He was the first Democrat elected as Nebraska's governor and served in that position in 1891, and from 1892 to 1893.

His opponent in his election for Governor, John Holbrook Powers, disputed the results of the election. While Boyd won by a margin of 1144 votes, Powers claimed to have evidence that "2000 persons were bribed in Douglas County to vote for Boyd." A resolution to investigate these allegations was introduced, but was ruled out of order.

However, the trouble was not over for Boyd. He was due to be sworn in as Governor of Nebraska on January 8, 1891, but John Milton Thayer, who was not a candidate in the 1890 election, challenged Boyd's citizenship, and thus his eligibility to be governor. This delayed Boyd's inauguration until January 15. Boyd took office as governor; however, he only served until May 5, 1891, because the Supreme Court of Nebraska ruled that Boyd was ineligible to be governor, and thus Thayer took office again on May 5. Boyd took his case, Boyd v. Nebraska ex rel. Thayer, to the United States Supreme Court, and it was argued on December 8, 1891. On February 1, 1892, the Supreme Court of the United States ruled that Boyd was eligible, and thus he took office again on February 8, 1892, and served out the remainder of his term.

== Death and legacy ==
Boyd died in Omaha, Nebraska, on April 30, 1906, and he is interred at Forest Lawn Memorial Park, Omaha, Douglas County, Nebraska.

Boyd County, Nebraska, is named after Boyd. Boyd Elementary School, part of the Omaha Public School system is also named for him, as well as Boyd Street that runs along the south side of the school's property.

From 1885 to 1890, Boyd's portrait was painted in Omaha by artist Herbert A. Collins.

== See also ==
- List of United States governors born outside the United States

Party political offices
Preceded by John A. McShane	Democratic nominee for Governor of Nebraska; 1890	Succeeded by Julius Sterling Morton
Political offices
Preceded by Champion S. Chase	Mayor of Omaha; 1881 – 1883	Succeeded by Champion S. Chase
Preceded by Patrick F. Murphy	Mayor of Omaha; 1885 – 1887	Succeeded by William J. Broatch
Preceded by John Milton Thayer	Governor of Nebraska; 1891	Succeeded by John Milton Thayer
Preceded by John Milton Thayer	Governor of Nebraska; 1892 – 1893	Succeeded by Lorenzo Crounse
