= Nebraska's congressional delegations =

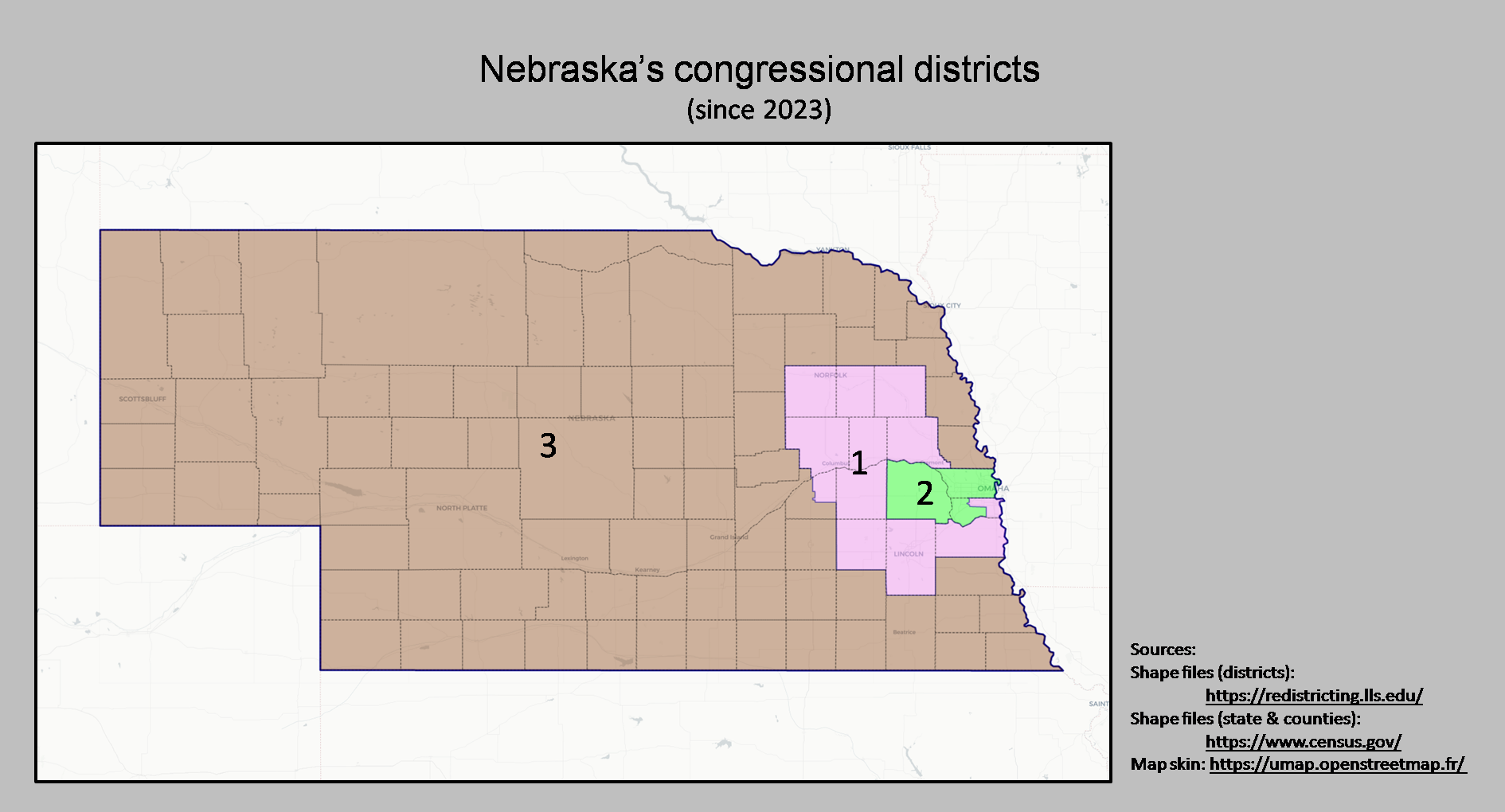
Nebraska's congressional districts since 2023

These are tables of congressional delegations from Nebraska to the United States House of Representatives and the United States Senate.

The current dean of the Nebraska delegation is Representative Adrian Smith (NE-3), having served in the House since 2007.

== U.S. House of Representatives ==
=== Current members ===
List of members, their terms in office, district boundaries, and the district political ratings according to the CPVI. The delegation has 3 members, all Republicans.

Current U.S. representatives from Nebraska
District	Member (Residence)	Party	Incumbent since	CPVI (2025)	District map
1st	Mike Flood (Norfolk)	Republican	June 28, 2022	R+6	
2nd	Don Bacon (Papillion)	Republican	January 3, 2017	D+3	
3rd	Adrian Smith (Gering)	Republican	January 3, 2007	R+27	

=== Delegate from Nebraska Territory ===
Congress	Delegate
33rd (1853–1855)	Napoleon Bonaparte; Giddings (D)
34th (1855–1857)	Bird Beers Chapman (D)
35th (1857–1859)	Fenner Ferguson (D)
36th (1859–1861)	Experience Estabrook (D)
36th (1859–1861)	Samuel Gordon Daily (R)
37th (1861–1863)	Samuel Gordon Daily (R)
38th (1863–1865)	Samuel Gordon Daily (R)
39th (1865–1867)	Phineas Hitchcock (R)

=== 1867–1883: one seat ===
Congress	At-large
39th (1867)	Turner M. Marquett (R)
40th (1867–1869)	John Taffe (R)
41st (1869–1871)	John Taffe (R)
42nd (1871–1873)	John Taffe (R)
43rd (1873–1875)	Lorenzo Crounse (R)
44th (1875–1877)	Lorenzo Crounse (R)
45th (1877–1879)	Frank Welch (R)
45th (1877–1879)	Thomas Jefferson Majors (R)
46th (1879–1881)	Edward K. Valentine (R)
47th (1881–1883)	Edward K. Valentine (R)

=== 1883–1893: three seats ===
Congress	1st district	2nd district	3rd district
48th (1883–1885)	Archibald J. Weaver (R)	James Laird (R)	Edward K. Valentine (R)
49th (1885–1887)	Archibald J. Weaver (R)	James Laird (R)	George W. E. Dorsey (R)
50th (1887–1889)	John A. McShane (D)	James Laird (R)	George W. E. Dorsey (R)
51st (1889–1891)	William James Connell (R)	James Laird (R)	George W. E. Dorsey (R)
51st (1889–1891)	William James Connell (R)	Gilbert L. Laws (R)	George W. E. Dorsey (R)
52nd (1891–1893)	William Jennings Bryan (D)	William A. McKeighan (Pop)	Omer M. Kem (Pop)

=== 1893–1933: six seats ===
Congress	1st district	2nd district	3rd district	4th district	5th district	6th district
53rd (1893–1895)	William Jennings; Bryan (D)	David Henry; Mercer (R)	George de Rue; Meiklejohn (R)	Eugene J. Hainer (R)	William A. McKeighan (Pop)	Omer M. Kem (Pop)
54th (1895–1897)	Jesse B. Strode (R)	David Henry; Mercer (R)	George de Rue; Meiklejohn (R)	Eugene J. Hainer (R)	William E. Andrews (R)	Omer M. Kem (Pop)
55th (1897–1899)	Jesse B. Strode (R)	David Henry; Mercer (R)	Samuel Maxwell (Pop)	William L. Stark (Pop)	Roderick D. Sutherland (Pop)	William Laury; Greene (Pop)
56th (1899–1901)	Elmer Burkett (R)	David Henry; Mercer (R)	John Seaton; Robinson (D)	William L. Stark (Pop)	Roderick D. Sutherland (Pop)	William Laury; Greene (Pop)
56th (1899–1901)	Elmer Burkett (R)	David Henry; Mercer (R)	John Seaton; Robinson (D)	William L. Stark (Pop)	Roderick D. Sutherland (Pop)	William Neville (Pop)
57th (1901–1903)	Elmer Burkett (R)	David Henry; Mercer (R)	John Seaton; Robinson (D)	William L. Stark (Pop)	Ashton C. Shallenberger (D)	William Neville (Pop)
58th (1903–1905)	Elmer Burkett (R)	Gilbert Hitchcock (D)	John McCarthy (R)	Edmund H. Hinshaw (R)	George W. Norris (R)	Moses Kinkaid (R)
59th (1905–1907)	Elmer Burkett (R)	John L. Kennedy (R)	John McCarthy (R)	Edmund H. Hinshaw (R)	George W. Norris (R)	Moses Kinkaid (R)
59th (1905–1907)	Ernest M. Pollard (R)	John L. Kennedy (R)	John McCarthy (R)	Edmund H. Hinshaw (R)	George W. Norris (R)	Moses Kinkaid (R)
60th (1907–1909)	Ernest M. Pollard (R)	Gilbert Hitchcock (D)	John Frank Boyd (R)	Edmund H. Hinshaw (R)	George W. Norris (R)	Moses Kinkaid (R)
61st (1909–1911)	John A. Maguire (D)	Gilbert Hitchcock (D)	James P. Latta (D)	Edmund H. Hinshaw (R)	George W. Norris (R)	Moses Kinkaid (R)
62nd (1911–1913)	John A. Maguire (D)	Charles O. Lobeck (D)	James P. Latta (D)	Charles H. Sloan (R)	George W. Norris (R)	Moses Kinkaid (R)
62nd (1911–1913)	John A. Maguire (D)	Charles O. Lobeck (D)	Dan V. Stephens (D)	Charles H. Sloan (R)	George W. Norris (R)	Moses Kinkaid (R)
63rd (1913–1915)	John A. Maguire (D)	Charles O. Lobeck (D)	Dan V. Stephens (D)	Charles H. Sloan (R)	Silas Reynolds; Barton (R)	Moses Kinkaid (R)
64th (1915–1917)	C. Frank Reavis (R)	Charles O. Lobeck (D)	Dan V. Stephens (D)	Charles H. Sloan (R)	Ashton C. Shallenberger (D)	Moses Kinkaid (R)
65th (1917–1919)	C. Frank Reavis (R)	Charles O. Lobeck (D)	Dan V. Stephens (D)	Charles H. Sloan (R)	Ashton C. Shallenberger (D)	Moses Kinkaid (R)
66th (1919–1921)	C. Frank Reavis (R)	Albert W. Jefferis (R)	Robert E. Evans (R)	Melvin O. McLaughlin (R)	William E. Andrews (R)	Moses Kinkaid (R)
67th (1921–1923)	C. Frank Reavis (R)	Albert W. Jefferis (R)	Robert E. Evans (R)	Melvin O. McLaughlin (R)	William E. Andrews (R)	Moses Kinkaid (R)
67th (1921–1923)	Roy H. Thorpe (R)	Albert W. Jefferis (R)	Robert E. Evans (R)	Melvin O. McLaughlin (R)	William E. Andrews (R)	Augustin Reed; Humphrey (R)
68th (1923–1925)	John H. Morehead (D)	Willis G. Sears (R)	Edgar Howard (D)	Melvin O. McLaughlin (R)	Ashton C. Shallenberger (D)	Robert G. Simmons (R)
69th (1925–1927)	John H. Morehead (D)	Willis G. Sears (R)	Edgar Howard (D)	Melvin O. McLaughlin (R)	Ashton C. Shallenberger (D)	Robert G. Simmons (R)
70th (1927–1929)	John H. Morehead (D)	Willis G. Sears (R)	Edgar Howard (D)	John N. Norton (D)	Ashton C. Shallenberger (D)	Robert G. Simmons (R)
71st (1929–1931)	John H. Morehead (D)	Willis G. Sears (R)	Edgar Howard (D)	Charles H. Sloan (R)	Fred G. Johnson (R)	Robert G. Simmons (R)
72nd (1931–1933)	John H. Morehead (D)	Howard M. Baldrige (R)	Edgar Howard (D)	John N. Norton (D)	Ashton C. Shallenberger (D)	Robert G. Simmons (R)

=== 1933–1943: five seats ===
Congress	1st district	2nd district	3rd district	4th district	5th district
73rd (1933–1935)	John H. Morehead (D)	Edward R. Burke (D)	Edgar Howard (D)	Ashton C. Shallenberger (D)	Terry Carpenter (D)
74th (1935–1937)	Henry C. Luckey (D)	Charles F. McLaughlin (D)	Karl Stefan (R)	Charles Binderup (D)	Harry B. Coffee (D)
75th (1937–1939)	Henry C. Luckey (D)	Charles F. McLaughlin (D)	Karl Stefan (R)	Charles Binderup (D)	Harry B. Coffee (D)
76th (1939–1941)	George H. Heinke (R)	Charles F. McLaughlin (D)	Karl Stefan (R)	Carl Curtis (R)	Harry B. Coffee (D)
76th (1939–1941)	John Hyde Sweet (R)	Charles F. McLaughlin (D)	Karl Stefan (R)	Carl Curtis (R)	Harry B. Coffee (D)
77th (1941–1943)	Oren S. Copeland	Charles F. McLaughlin (D)	Karl Stefan (R)	Carl Curtis (R)	Harry B. Coffee (D)

=== 1943–1963: four seats ===
Congress	1st district	2nd district	3rd district	4th district
78th (1943–1945)	Carl Curtis (R)	Howard Buffett (R)	Karl Stefan (R)	Arthur L. Miller (R)
79th (1945–1947)	Carl Curtis (R)	Howard Buffett (R)	Karl Stefan (R)	Arthur L. Miller (R)
80th (1947–1949)	Carl Curtis (R)	Howard Buffett (R)	Karl Stefan (R)	Arthur L. Miller (R)
81st (1949–1951)	Carl Curtis (R)	Eugene D. O'Sullivan (D)	Karl Stefan (R)	Arthur L. Miller (R)
82nd (1951–1953)	Carl Curtis (R)	Howard Buffett (R)	Karl Stefan (R)	Arthur L. Miller (R)
82nd (1951–1953)	Carl Curtis (R)	Howard Buffett (R)	R. D. Harrison (R)	Arthur L. Miller (R)
83rd (1953–1955)	Carl Curtis (R)	Roman Hruska (R)	R. D. Harrison (R)	Arthur L. Miller (R)
83rd (1953–1955)	Carl Curtis (R)	vacant	R. D. Harrison (R)	Arthur L. Miller (R)
84th (1955–1957)	Phil Weaver (R)	Jackson B. Chase (R)	R. D. Harrison (R)	Arthur L. Miller (R)
85th (1957–1959)	Phil Weaver (R)	Glenn Cunningham (R)	R. D. Harrison (R)	Arthur L. Miller (R)
86th (1959–1961)	Phil Weaver (R)	Glenn Cunningham (R)	Lawrence Brock (D)	Donald McGinley (D)
87th (1961–1963)	Phil Weaver (R)	Glenn Cunningham (R)	Ralph F. Beermann (R)	David Martin (R)

=== 1963–present: three seats ===
Congress	1st district	2nd district	3rd district
88th (1963–1965)	Ralph F. Beermann (R)	Glenn Cunningham (R)	David Martin (R)
89th (1965–1967)	Clair A. Callan (D)	Glenn Cunningham (R)	David Martin (R)
90th (1967–1969)	Robert V. Denney (R)	Glenn Cunningham (R)	David Martin (R)
91st (1969–1971)	Robert V. Denney (R)	Glenn Cunningham (R)	David Martin (R)
92nd (1971–1973)	Charles Thone (R)	John Y. McCollister (R)	David Martin (R)
93rd (1973–1975)	Charles Thone (R)	John Y. McCollister (R)	David Martin (R)
94th (1975–1977)	Charles Thone (R)	John Y. McCollister (R)	Virginia D. Smith (R)
95th (1977–1979)	Charles Thone (R)	John J. Cavanaugh III (D)	Virginia D. Smith (R)
96th (1979–1981)	Doug Bereuter (R)	John J. Cavanaugh III (D)	Virginia D. Smith (R)
97th (1981–1983)	Doug Bereuter (R)	Hal Daub (R)	Virginia D. Smith (R)
98th (1983–1985)	Doug Bereuter (R)	Hal Daub (R)	Virginia D. Smith (R)
99th (1985–1987)	Doug Bereuter (R)	Hal Daub (R)	Virginia D. Smith (R)
100th (1987–1989)	Doug Bereuter (R)	Hal Daub (R)	Virginia D. Smith (R)
101st (1989–1991)	Doug Bereuter (R)	Peter Hoagland (D)	Virginia D. Smith (R)
102nd (1991–1993)	Doug Bereuter (R)	Peter Hoagland (D)	Bill Barrett (R)
103rd (1993–1995)	Doug Bereuter (R)	Peter Hoagland (D)	Bill Barrett (R)
104th (1995–1997)	Doug Bereuter (R)	Jon; Christensen (R)	Bill Barrett (R)
105th (1997–1999)	Doug Bereuter (R)	Jon; Christensen (R)	Bill Barrett (R)
106th (1999–2001)	Doug Bereuter (R)	Lee Terry (R)	Bill Barrett (R)
107th (2001–2003)	Doug Bereuter (R)	Lee Terry (R)	Tom Osborne (R)
108th (2003–2005)	Doug Bereuter (R)	Lee Terry (R)	Tom Osborne (R)
108th (2003–2005)	vacant	Lee Terry (R)	Tom Osborne (R)
109th (2005–2007)	Jeff Fortenberry (R)	Lee Terry (R)	Tom Osborne (R)
110th (2007–2009)	Jeff Fortenberry (R)	Lee Terry (R)	Adrian Smith (R)
111th (2009–2011)	Jeff Fortenberry (R)	Lee Terry (R)	Adrian Smith (R)
112th (2011–2013)	Jeff Fortenberry (R)	Lee Terry (R)	Adrian Smith (R)
113th (2013–2015)	Jeff Fortenberry (R)	Lee Terry (R)	Adrian Smith (R)
114th (2015–2017)	Jeff Fortenberry (R)	Brad Ashford (D)	Adrian Smith (R)
115th (2017–2019)	Jeff Fortenberry (R)	Don Bacon (R)	Adrian Smith (R)
116th (2019–2021)	Jeff Fortenberry (R)	Don Bacon (R)	Adrian Smith (R)
117th (2021–2023)	Jeff Fortenberry (R)	Don Bacon (R)	Adrian Smith (R)
117th (2021–2023)	Mike Flood (R)	Don Bacon (R)	Adrian Smith (R)
118th (2023–2025)	Mike Flood (R)	Don Bacon (R)	Adrian Smith (R)
119th (2025–2027)	Mike Flood (R)	Don Bacon (R)	Adrian Smith (R)
120th (2027–2029)	Mike Flood (R)	Denise Powell (D)	Adrian Smith (R)

== U.S. Senate ==
Current U.S. senators from Nebraska
Nebraska CPVI (2025): R+10	Class I senator	Class II senator
Nebraska CPVI (2025): R+10	Deb Fischer (Senior senator) (Lincoln)	Pete Ricketts (Junior senator) (Omaha)
Party	Republican	Republican
Incumbent since	January 3, 2013	January 12, 2023

Senators from Nebraska
Class I senator	Congress	Class II senator
Thomas Tipton (R)	39th (1867)	John Milton; Thayer (R)
Thomas Tipton (R)	40th (1867–1869)	John Milton; Thayer (R)
Thomas Tipton (R)	41st (1869–1871)	John Milton; Thayer (R)
Thomas Tipton (R)	42nd (1871–1873)	Phineas Hitchcock (R)
Thomas Tipton (R)	43rd (1873–1875)	Phineas Hitchcock (R)
Algernon Paddock (R)	44th (1875–1877)	Phineas Hitchcock (R)
Algernon Paddock (R)	45th (1877–1879)	Alvin Saunders (R)
Algernon Paddock (R)	46th (1879–1881)	Alvin Saunders (R)
Charles Van Wyck (R)	47th (1881–1883)	Alvin Saunders (R)
Charles Van Wyck (R)	48th (1883–1885)	Charles F. Manderson (R)
Charles Van Wyck (R)	49th (1885–1887)	Charles F. Manderson (R)
Algernon Paddock (R)	50th (1887–1889)	Charles F. Manderson (R)
Algernon Paddock (R)	51st (1889–1891)	Charles F. Manderson (R)
Algernon Paddock (R)	52nd (1891–1893)	Charles F. Manderson (R)
William V. Allen (Pop)	53rd (1893–1895)	Charles F. Manderson (R)
William V. Allen (Pop)	54th (1895–1897)	John Mellen; Thurston (R)
William V. Allen (Pop)	55th (1897–1899)	John Mellen; Thurston (R)
Monroe Hayward (R)	56th (1899–1901)	John Mellen; Thurston (R)
William V. Allen (Pop)	56th (1899–1901)	John Mellen; Thurston (R)
William V. Allen (Pop)	57th (1901–1903)	Joseph Millard (R)
Charles H. Dietrich (R)	57th (1901–1903)	Joseph Millard (R)
Charles H. Dietrich (R)	58th (1903–1905)	Joseph Millard (R)
Elmer Burkett (R)	59th (1905–1907)	Joseph Millard (R)
Elmer Burkett (R)	60th (1907–1909)	Norris Brown (R)
Elmer Burkett (R)	61st (1909–1911)	Norris Brown (R)
Gilbert Hitchcock (D)	62nd (1911–1913)	Norris Brown (R)
Gilbert Hitchcock (D)	63rd (1913–1915)	George W. Norris (R)
Gilbert Hitchcock (D)	64th (1915–1917)	George W. Norris (R)
Gilbert Hitchcock (D)	65th (1917–1919)	George W. Norris (R)
Gilbert Hitchcock (D)	66th (1919–1921)	George W. Norris (R)
Gilbert Hitchcock (D)	67th (1921–1923)	George W. Norris (R)
Robert B. Howell (R)	68th (1923–1925)	George W. Norris (R)
Robert B. Howell (R)	69th (1925–1927)	George W. Norris (R)
Robert B. Howell (R)	70th (1927–1929)	George W. Norris (R)
Robert B. Howell (R)	71st (1929–1931)	George W. Norris (R)
Robert B. Howell (R)	72nd (1931–1933)	George W. Norris (R)
Robert B. Howell (R)	73rd (1933–1935)	George W. Norris (R)
William H. Thompson (D)	73rd (1933–1935)	George W. Norris (R)
Richard C. Hunter (D)	73rd (1933–1935)	George W. Norris (R)
Edward R. Burke (D)	74th (1935–1937)	George W. Norris (R)
Edward R. Burke (D)	74th (1935–1937)	George W. Norris (I)
Edward R. Burke (D)	75th (1937–1939)	George W. Norris (I)
Edward R. Burke (D)	76th (1939–1941)	George W. Norris (I)
Hugh A. Butler (R)	77th (1941–1943)	George W. Norris (I)
Hugh A. Butler (R)	78th (1943–1945)	Kenneth S. Wherry (R)
Hugh A. Butler (R)	79th (1945–1947)	Kenneth S. Wherry (R)
Hugh A. Butler (R)	80th (1947–1949)	Kenneth S. Wherry (R)
Hugh A. Butler (R)	81st (1949–1951)	Kenneth S. Wherry (R)
Hugh A. Butler (R)	82nd (1951–1953)	Kenneth S. Wherry (R)
Hugh A. Butler (R)	82nd (1951–1953)	Fred A. Seaton (R)
Hugh A. Butler (R)	82nd (1951–1953)	Dwight Griswold (R)
Hugh A. Butler (R)	83rd (1953–1955)	Dwight Griswold (R)
Hugh A. Butler (R)	83rd (1953–1955)	Eva Bowring (R)
Samuel W. Reynolds (R)	83rd (1953–1955)	Hazel Abel (R)
Roman Hruska (R)	83rd (1953–1955)	Carl Curtis (R)
Roman Hruska (R)	84th (1955–1957)	Carl Curtis (R)
Roman Hruska (R)	85th (1957–1959)	Carl Curtis (R)
Roman Hruska (R)	86th (1959–1961)	Carl Curtis (R)
Roman Hruska (R)	87th (1961–1963)	Carl Curtis (R)
Roman Hruska (R)	88th (1963–1965)	Carl Curtis (R)
Roman Hruska (R)	89th (1965–1967)	Carl Curtis (R)
Roman Hruska (R)	90th (1967–1969)	Carl Curtis (R)
Roman Hruska (R)	91st (1969–1971)	Carl Curtis (R)
Roman Hruska (R)	92nd (1971–1973)	Carl Curtis (R)
Roman Hruska (R)	93rd (1973–1975)	Carl Curtis (R)
Roman Hruska (R)	94th (1975–1977)	Carl Curtis (R)
Edward Zorinsky (D) (Note: Senator Zorinsky died on March 6, 1987, while in office.)	94th (1975–1977)	Carl Curtis (R)
Edward Zorinsky (D)	95th (1977–1979)	Carl Curtis (R)
Edward Zorinsky (D)	96th (1979–1981)	J. James Exon (D)
Edward Zorinsky (D)	97th (1981–1983)	J. James Exon (D)
Edward Zorinsky (D)	98th (1983–1985)	J. James Exon (D)
Edward Zorinsky (D)	99th (1985–1987)	J. James Exon (D)
Edward Zorinsky (D)	100th (1987–1989)	J. James Exon (D)
David Karnes (R)	100th (1987–1989)	J. James Exon (D)
Bob Kerrey (D)	101st (1989–1991)	J. James Exon (D)
Bob Kerrey (D)	102nd (1991–1993)	J. James Exon (D)
Bob Kerrey (D)	103rd (1993–1995)	J. James Exon (D)
Bob Kerrey (D)	104th (1995–1997)	J. James Exon (D)
Bob Kerrey (D)	105th (1997–1999)	Chuck Hagel (R)
Bob Kerrey (D)	106th (1999–2001)	Chuck Hagel (R)
Ben Nelson (D)	107th (2001–2003)	Chuck Hagel (R)
Ben Nelson (D)	108th (2003–2005)	Chuck Hagel (R)
Ben Nelson (D)	109th (2005–2007)	Chuck Hagel (R)
Ben Nelson (D)	110th (2007–2009)	Chuck Hagel (R)
Ben Nelson (D)	111th (2009–2011)	Mike Johanns (R)
Ben Nelson (D)	112th (2011–2013)	Mike Johanns (R)
Deb Fischer (R)	113th (2013–2015)	Mike Johanns (R)
Deb Fischer (R)	114th (2015–2017)	Ben Sasse (R) (Note: Senator Sasse resigned from the Senate on January 8, 2023 to serve as the president of the University of Florida.)
Deb Fischer (R)	115th (2017–2019)	Ben Sasse (R)
Deb Fischer (R)	116th (2019–2021)	Ben Sasse (R)
Deb Fischer (R)	117th (2021–2023)	Ben Sasse (R)
Deb Fischer (R)	118th (2023–2025)	Ben Sasse (R)
Deb Fischer (R)	118th (2023–2025)	Pete Ricketts (R)
Deb Fischer (R)	119th (2025–2027)	Pete Ricketts (R)
Deb Fischer (R)	120th (2027–2029)	Pete Ricketts (R)

== Key ==
Democratic (D)
Populist (Pop)
Republican (R)
Independent (I)

== See also ==
- List of United States congressional districts
- Nebraska's congressional districts
- Political party strength in Nebraska
