= 1936 United States Senate election in Nebraska =

- November 3, 1936
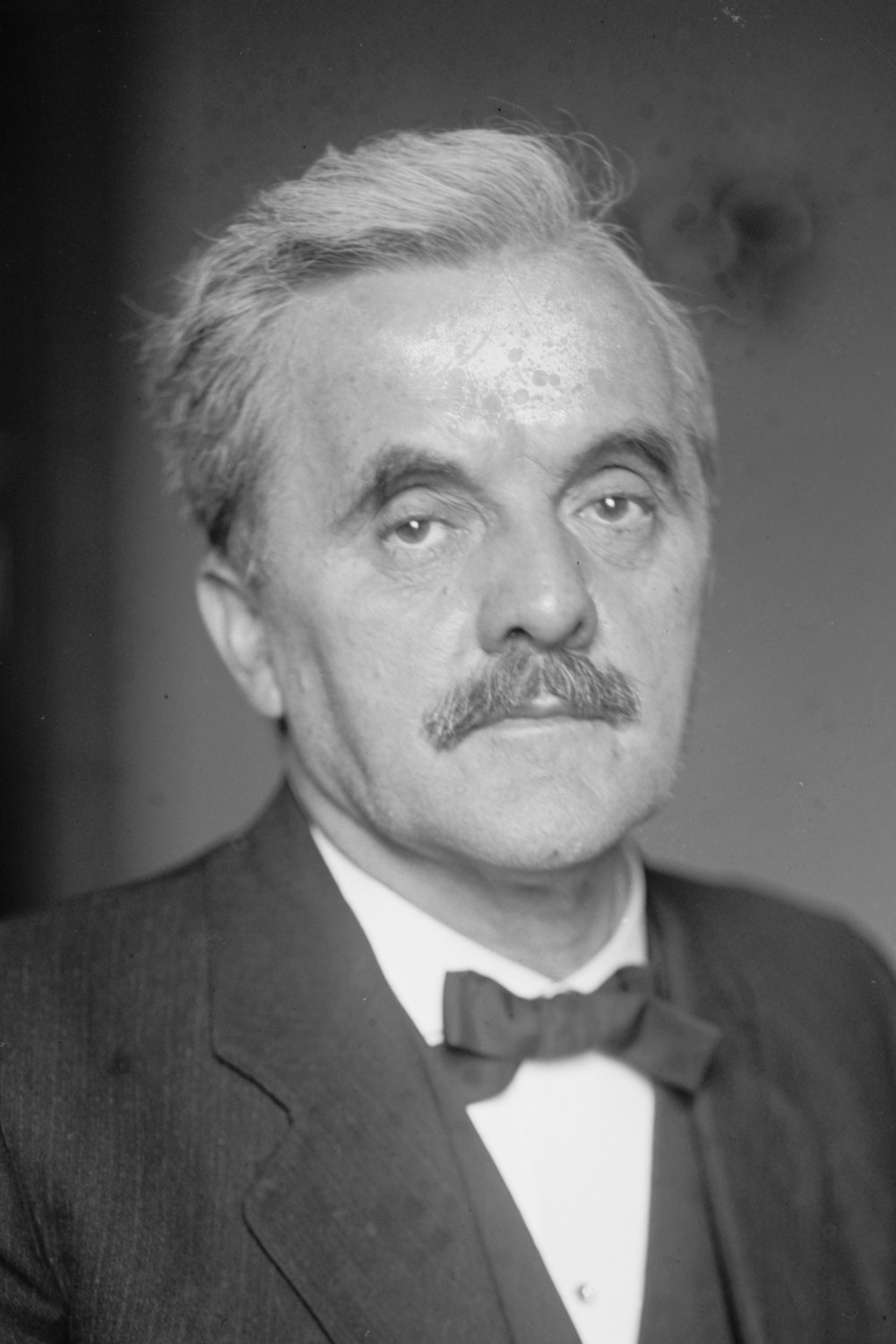

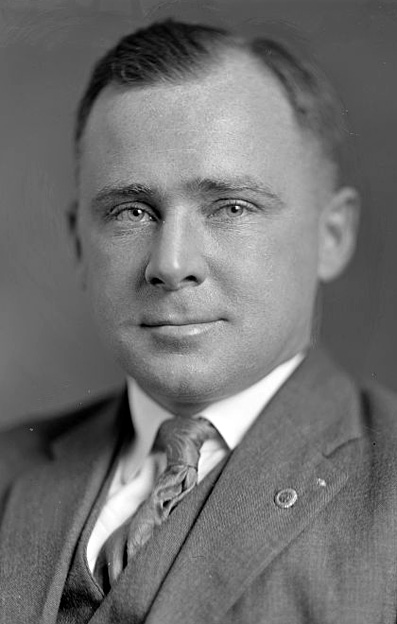

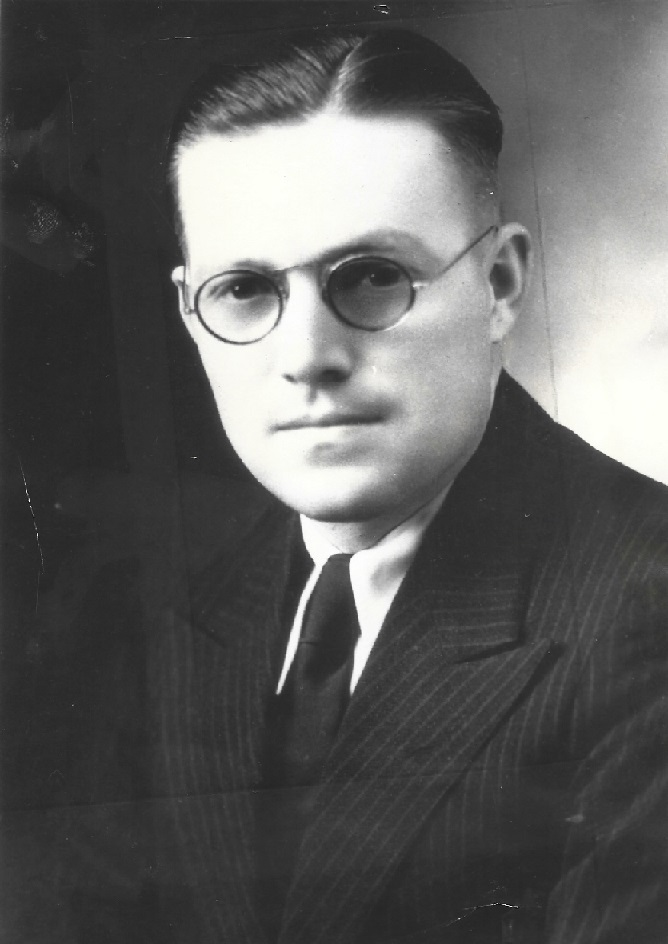
Nominee	George Norris	Robert Simmons	Terry Carpenter
Party	Independent	Republican	Democratic
Popular vote	258,700	223,276	108,391
Percentage	43.82%	37.82%	18.36%
County results
Norris
30–40%
40–50%
50–60%
60–70%
Simmons
40–50%
50–60%
Carpenter
30–40%
40–50%
50–60%
60–70%
U.S. senator before election
George W. Norris
Independent
Elected U.S. Senator
George W. Norris
Independent

The 1936 United States Senate election in Nebraska was held on November 3, 1936. Incumbent Senator George W. Norris, who had previously been elected as a Republican, ran for re-election to a fifth term as an independent candidate. He was challenged in the general election by former Congressman Robert G. Simmons, the Republican nominee, and former Congressman Terry Carpenter, the Democratic nominee. Norris won significant support from Democratic voters and won re-election with a 44% plurality over Simmons, who won 38%, with Carpenter in a distant third with 18%.

== Republican primary ==
=== Candidates ===
- Robert G. Simmons, former U.S. Representative from Nebraska's 3rd congressional district, 1934 Republican nominee for the U.S. Senate
- Harry O. Palmer, attorney, 1930 candidate for Nebraska Supreme Court, 1932 Republican candidate for Governor
- Lloyd C. Constable, Wymore druggist
- Cleon Dech, businessman

=== Results ===
Republican primary results
Party	Candidate	Votes	%
Republican	Robert Simmons	82,048	71.16%
Republican	Harry O. Palmer	22,687	19.68%
Republican	Lloyd C. Constable	5,959	5.17%
Republican	Cleon Dech	3,200	2.78%
Republican	George W. Norris (inc.) (write-in)	1,376	1.19%
Republican	Write-ins	31	0.03%
Total votes		115,301	100.00%

== Democratic primary ==
=== Candidates ===
- Terry Carpenter, former U.S. Representative from Nebraska's 5th congressional district, 1934 Democratic candidate for Governor
- James E. Quigley, Chairman of the Nebraska Democratic Party, former Cherry County Judge
- George Hall, Nebraska State Treasurer
- Emil Placek, Wahoo banker

=== Results ===
Democratic primary results
Party	Candidate	Votes	%
Democratic	Terry Carpenter	41,212	31.31%
Democratic	James E. Quigley	36,882	28.02%
Democratic	George Hall	25,183	19.13%
Democratic	Emil Placek	25,173	19.12%
Democratic	George W. Norris (incumbent) (write-in)	3,088	2.35%
Democratic	Write-ins	91	0.07%
Total votes		131,629	100.00%

== General election ==
=== Candidates ===
- George W. Norris, incumbent U.S. Senator (Independent)
- Robert G. Simmons, former U.S. Representative from Nebraska's 3rd congressional district (Republican)
- Terry Carpenter, former U.S. Representative from Nebraska's 5th congressional district (Democratic)

=== Results ===
1936 United States Senate election in Nebraska
Party	Candidate	Votes	%	±%
Independent	George W. Norris (inc.)	258,700	43.82%	—
Republican	Robert G. Simmons	223,276	37.82%	−19.02%
Democratic	Terry Carpenter	108,391	18.36%	−21.38%
Write-in		7	0.00%	—
Majority		74,323	17.10%	−8.02%
Total votes		434,804	100.00%	
Independent hold				

== See also ==
- 1936 United States Senate elections
