= List of United States representatives from Nebraska =

The following is an alphabetical list of United States representatives from the state of Nebraska. For chronological tables of members of both houses of the United States Congress from the state (through the present day), see Nebraska's congressional delegations. The list of names should be complete (as of June 28, 2022), but other data may be incomplete. It includes members who have represented both the state and the territory, both past and present.

== Current members ==
Updated January 3, 2025.

- 1st district: Mike Flood (R) (2022)
- 2nd district: Don Bacon (R) (2017)
- 3rd district: Adrian Smith (R) (2007)

== List of members and delegates ==
Representative	Party	Years	District	Notes
William E. Andrews	Republican	March 4, 1895 – March 3, 1897	5th	Elected in 1894. Lost re-election to Sutherland.
William E. Andrews	Republican	March 4, 1919 – March 3, 1923	5th	Elected in 1918. Lost re-election to Shallenberger.
Brad Ashford	Democratic	January 3, 2015 – January 3, 2017	2nd	Elected in 2014. Lost re-election to Bacon.
Don Bacon	Republican	January 3, 2017 – present	2nd	Elected in 2016. Incumbent.
Howard M. Baldrige	Republican	March 4, 1931 – March 3, 1933	2nd	Elected in 1930. Lost re-election to Burke.
Bill Barrett	Republican	January 3, 1991 – January 3, 2001	3rd	Elected in 1990. Retired.
Silas Reynolds Barton	Republican	March 4, 1913 – March 3, 1915	5th	Elected in 1912. Lost re-election to Shallenberger.
Ralph F. Beermann	Republican	January 3, 1961 – January 3, 1963	3rd	Elected in 1960. Redistricted to the 1st district.
Ralph F. Beermann	Republican	January 3, 1963 – January 3, 1965	1st	Redistricted from the 3rd district and re-elected in 1962. Lost re-election to Callan.
Doug Bereuter	Republican	January 3, 1979 – August 31, 2004	1st	Elected in 1978. Resigned to become president of The Asia Foundation.
Charles Binderup	Democratic	January 3, 1935 – January 3, 1939	4th	Elected in 1934. Lost re-election to Curtis.
John Frank Boyd	Republican	March 4, 1907 – March 3, 1909	3rd	Elected in 1906. Lost re-election to Latta.
Lawrence Brock	Democratic	January 3, 1959 – January 3, 1961	3rd	Elected in 1958. Lost re-election to Beermann.
William Jennings Bryan	Democratic	March 4, 1891 – March 3, 1895	1st	Elected in 1890. Retired to run for U.S. senator.
Howard Buffett	Republican	January 3, 1943 – January 3, 1949	2nd	Elected in 1942. Lost re-election to O'Sullivan.
Howard Buffett	Republican	January 3, 1951 – January 3, 1953	2nd	Elected in 1950. Retired.
Edward R. Burke	Democratic	March 4, 1933 – January 3, 1935	2nd	Elected in 1932. Retired to run for U.S. senator.
Elmer Burkett	Republican	March 4, 1899 – March 3, 1905	1st	Elected in 1898. Re-elected in 1904 but declined the election when elected U.S. Senator.
Clair A. Callan	Democratic	January 3, 1965 – January 3, 1967	1st	Elected in 1964. Lost re-election to Denney.
Terry Carpenter	Democratic	March 4, 1933 – January 3, 1935	5th	Elected in 1932. Retired to run for governor.
John J. Cavanaugh III	Democratic	January 3, 1977 – January 3, 1981	2nd	Elected in 1976. Retired.
Bird Beers Chapman	Democratic	March 4, 1855 – March 3, 1857	Territory	Elected in 1855. Lost re-election to Ferguson.
Jackson B. Chase	Republican	January 3, 1955 – January 3, 1957	2nd	Elected in 1954. Retired.
Jon Christensen	Republican	January 3, 1995 – January 3, 1999	2nd	Elected in 1994. Retired to run for Governor.
Harry B. Coffee	Democratic	January 3, 1935 – January 3, 1943	5th	Elected in 1934. Retired to run for U.S. senator.
William J. Connell	Republican	March 4, 1889 – March 3, 1891	1st	Elected in 1888. Lost re-election to Bryan.
Oren S. Copeland	Republican	January 3, 1941 – January 3, 1943	1st	Elected in 1940. Lost renomination to Curtis.
Lorenzo Crounse	Republican	March 4, 1873 – March 3, 1877	At-large	Elected in 1872. Retired.
Glenn Cunningham	Republican	January 3, 1957 – January 3, 1971	2nd	Elected in 1956. Lost renomination to McCollister.
Carl Curtis	Republican	January 3, 1939 – January 3, 1943	4th	Re-elected in 1938. Redistricted to the 1st district.
Carl Curtis	Republican	January 3, 1943 – December 31, 1954	1st	Redistricted from the 4th district and re-elected in 1942. Resigned when appointed U.S. senator.
Samuel Gordon Daily	Republican	May 18, 1860 – March 3, 1865	Territory	Won contested election. Retired.
Hal Daub	Republican	January 3, 1981 – January 3, 1989	2nd	Elected in 1980. Retired to run for U.S. senator.
Robert V. Denney	Republican	January 3, 1967 – January 3, 1971	1st	Elected in 1966. Retired.
George W. E. Dorsey	Republican	March 4, 1885 – March 3, 1891	3rd	Elected in 1884. Lost re-election to Kem.
Experience Estabrook	Democratic	March 4, 1859 – May 18, 1860	Territory	Elected in 1859. Lost contested election to Daily.
Robert E. Evans	Republican	March 4, 1919 – March 3, 1923	3rd	Elected in 1918. Lost re-election to Howard.
Fenner Ferguson	Democratic	March 4, 1857 – March 3, 1859	Territory	Elected in 1857. Retired.
Mike Flood	Republican	June 28, 2022 – present	1st	Elected to finish Fortenberry's term. Incumbent.
Jeff Fortenberry	Republican	January 3, 2005 – March 31, 2022	1st	Elected in 2004. Resigned.
Napoleon Bonaparte Giddings	Democratic	January 5, 1855 – March 3, 1855	Territory	Elected in 1854. Retired.
William L. Greene	Populist	March 4, 1897 – March 11, 1899	6th	Elected in 1896. Died.
Eugene J. Hainer	Republican	March 4, 1893 – March 3, 1897	4th	Elected in 1892. Lost re-election to Stark.
R. D. Harrison	Republican	October 4, 1951 – January 3, 1959	3rd	Elected to finish Stefan's term. Lost re-election to Brock.
George H. Heinke	Republican	January 3, 1939 – January 2, 1940	1st	Re-elected in 1938. Died.
Edmund H. Hinshaw	Republican	March 4, 1903 – March 3, 1911	4th	Elected in 1902. Retired.
Gilbert Hitchcock	Democratic	March 4, 1903 – March 3, 1905	2nd	Elected in 1902. Lost re-election to Kennedy.
Gilbert Hitchcock	Democratic	March 4, 1907 – March 3, 1911	2nd	Elected in 1906. Retired to run for U.S. senator.
Phineas Hitchcock	Republican	March 4, 1865 – March 1, 1867	Territory	Re-elected in 1864 or 1865. Position abolished upon statehood.
Peter Hoagland	Democratic	January 3, 1989 – January 3, 1995	2nd	Elected in 1988. Lost re-election to Christensen.
Edgar Howard	Democratic	March 4, 1923 – January 3, 1935	3rd	Elected in 1922. Lost re-election to Stefan.
Roman Hruska	Republican	January 3, 1953 – November 8, 1954	2nd	Elected in 1952. Resigned when elected U.S. Senator.
Augustin Reed Humphrey	Republican	November 7, 1922 – March 3, 1923	6th	Elected to finish Kinkaid's term. Retired.
Albert W. Jefferis	Republican	March 4, 1919 – March 3, 1923	2nd	Elected in 1918. Retired to run for U.S. senator.
Fred Gustus Johnson	Republican	March 4, 1929 – March 3, 1931	5th	Elected in 1928. Lost re-election to Shallenberger.
Omer M. Kem	Populist	March 4, 1891 – March 3, 1893	3rd	Elected in 1890. Redistricted to the 6th district.
Omer M. Kem	Populist	March 4, 1893 – March 3, 1897	6th	Redistricted from the 3rd district and re-elected in 1892. Retired.
John L. Kennedy	Republican	March 4, 1905 – March 3, 1907	2nd	Elected in 1904. Lost re-election to Hitchcock.
Moses Kinkaid	Republican	March 4, 1903 – July 6, 1922	6th	Elected in 1902. Died.
James Laird	Republican	March 4, 1883 – August 17, 1889	2nd	Elected in 1882. Died.
James P. Latta	Democratic	March 4, 1909 – September 11, 1911	3rd	Elected in 1908. Died.
Gilbert L. Laws	Republican	December 2, 1889 – March 3, 1891	2nd	Elected to finish Laird's term. Retired.
Charles O. Lobeck	Democratic	March 4, 1911 – March 3, 1919	2nd	Elected in 1910. Lost re-election to Jefferis.
Henry C. Luckey	Democratic	January 3, 1935 – January 3, 1939	1st	Elected in 1934. Lost re-election to Heinke.
John A. Maguire	Democratic	March 4, 1909 – March 3, 1915	1st	Elected in 1908. Lost re-election to Reavis.
Thomas Jefferson Majors	Republican	November 5, 1878 – March 3, 1879	At-large	Elected to finish Welch's term. Claimed to be (unrecognised) second member of Nebraska's House delegation.
Turner M. Marquett	Republican	March 2, 1867 – March 3, 1867	At-large	Elected in 1866. Retired.
David Martin	Republican	January 3, 1961 – January 3, 1963	4th	Elected in 1960. Redistricted to the 3rd district.
David Martin	Republican	January 3, 1963 – December 31, 1974	3rd	Redistricted from the 4th district and re-elected in 1962. Retired and resigned early.
Samuel Maxwell	Populist	March 4, 1897 – March 3, 1899	3rd	Elected in 1896. Retired.
John McCarthy	Republican	March 4, 1903 – March 3, 1907	3rd	Elected in 1902. Lost renomination to Boyd.
John Y. McCollister	Republican	January 3, 1971 – January 3, 1977	2nd	Elected in 1970. Retired to run for U.S. Senator.
Donald McGinley	Democratic	January 3, 1959 – January 3, 1961	4th	Elected in 1958. Lost re-election to Martin.
William A. McKeighan	Populist	March 4, 1891 – March 3, 1893	2nd	Elected in 1890. Redistricted to the 5th district.
William A. McKeighan	Populist	March 4, 1893 – March 3, 1895	5th	Redistricted from the 2nd district and re-elected in 1892. Lost re-election to Andrews.
Charles F. McLaughlin	Democratic	January 3, 1935 – January 3, 1943	2nd	Elected in 1934. Lost re-election to Buffett.
Melvin O. McLaughlin	Republican	March 4, 1919 – March 3, 1927	4th	Elected in 1918. Lost re-election to Norton.
John A. McShane	Democratic	March 4, 1887 – March 3, 1889	1st	Elected in 1886. Retired to run for U.S. senator..
George de Rue Meiklejohn	Republican	March 4, 1893 – March 3, 1897	3rd	Elected in 1892. Retired.
David Henry Mercer	Republican	March 4, 1893 – March 3, 1903	2nd	Elected in 1892. Lost re-election to Hitchcock.
Arthur L. Miller	Republican	January 3, 1943 – January 3, 1959	4th	Re-elected in 1942. Lost re-election to McGinley.
John H. Morehead	Democratic	March 4, 1923 – January 3, 1935	1st	Elected in 1922. Retired.
William Neville	Populist	December 4, 1899 – March 3, 1903	6th	Elected to finish Greene's term. Retired.
George W. Norris	Republican	March 4, 1903 – March 3, 1913	5th	Elected in 1902. Retired to run for U.S. senator.
John N. Norton	Democratic	March 4, 1927 – March 3, 1929	4th	Elected in 1926. Lost re-election to Sloan.
John N. Norton	Democratic	March 4, 1931 – March 3, 1933	4th	Elected in 1930. Lost renomination to Shallenberger.
Eugene D. O'Sullivan	Democratic	January 3, 1949 – January 3, 1951	2nd	Elected in 1948. Lost re-election to Buffet.
Tom Osborne	Republican	January 3, 2001 – January 3, 2007	3rd	Elected in 2000. Retired to run for Governor of Nebraska.
Ernest M. Pollard	Republican	July 18, 1905 – March 3, 1909	1st	Elected to finish Burkett's term. Lost re-election to Maguire.
C. Frank Reavis	Republican	March 4, 1915 – June 3, 1922	1st	Elected in 1914. Resigned to become special assistant to the U.S. Attorney General.
John Seaton Robinson	Democratic	March 4, 1899 – March 3, 1903	3rd	Elected in 1898. Lost re-election to McCarthy.
Willis G. Sears	Republican	March 4, 1923 – March 3, 1931	2nd	Elected in 1922. Lost renomination to Baldrige.
Ashton C. Shallenberger	Democratic	March 4, 1901 – March 3, 1903	5th	Elected in 1900. Lost re-election to Norris.
Ashton C. Shallenberger	Democratic	March 4, 1915 – March 3, 1919	5th	Elected in 1914. Lost re-election to Andrews.
Ashton C. Shallenberger	Democratic	March 4, 1923 – March 3, 1929	5th	Elected in 1922. Lost re-election to Johnson.
Ashton C. Shallenberger	Democratic	March 4, 1931 – March 3, 1933	5th	Elected in 1930. Redistricted to the 4th district.
Ashton C. Shallenberger	Democratic	March 4, 1933 – January 3, 1935	4th	Redistricted from the 5th district and re-elected in 1932. Lost renomination to Binderup.
Robert G. Simmons	Republican	March 4, 1923 – March 3, 1933	6th	Elected in 1922. Redistricted to the 5th district and lost re-election to Carpenter.
Charles H. Sloan	Republican	March 4, 1911 – March 3, 1919	4th	Elected in 1910. Retired.
Charles H. Sloan	Republican	March 4, 1929 – March 3, 1931	4th	Elected in 1928. Lost re-election to Norton.
Adrian Smith	Republican	January 3, 2007 – present	3rd	Elected in 2006. Incumbent
Virginia Smith	Republican	January 3, 1975 – January 3, 1991	3rd	Elected in 1974. Retired.
William L. Stark	Populist	March 4, 1897 – March 3, 1903	4th	Elected in 1896. Lost re-election to Hinshaw.
Karl Stefan	Republican	January 3, 1935 – October 2, 1951	3rd	Elected in 1934. Died.
Dan V. Stephens	Democratic	November 7, 1911 – March 3, 1919	3rd	Elected to finish Latta's term. Lost re-election to Evans.
Jesse B. Strode	Republican	March 4, 1895 – March 3, 1899	1st	Elected in 1894. Retired.
Roderick D. Sutherland	Populist	March 4, 1897 – March 3, 1901	5th	Elected in 1896. Retired.
John H. Sweet	Republican	April 19, 1940 – January 3, 1941	1st	Elected to finish Heinke's term. Retired.
John Taffe	Republican	March 4, 1867 – March 3, 1873	At-large	Elected in 1866. Retired.
Lee Terry	Republican	January 3, 1999 – January 3, 2015	2nd	Elected in 1998. Lost re-election to Ashford.
Charles Thone	Republican	January 3, 1971 – January 3, 1979	1st	Elected in 1970. Retired to run for Governor of Nebraska.
Roy H. Thorpe	Republican	November 7, 1922 – March 3, 1923	1st	Elected to finish Reavis's term. Retired.
Edward K. Valentine	Republican	March 4, 1879 – March 3, 1883	At-large	Elected in 1878. Redistricted to the 3rd district.
Edward K. Valentine	Republican	March 4, 1883 – March 3, 1885	3rd	Redistricted from at-large district and re-elected in 1882. Retired.
Archibald J. Weaver	Republican	March 4, 1883 – March 3, 1887	1st	Elected in 1882. Retired.
Phil Weaver	Republican	January 3, 1955 – January 3, 1963	1st	Elected in 1954. Lost renomination to Beermann.
Frank Welch	Republican	March 4, 1877 – September 4, 1878	At-large	Elected in 1876. Died.

== See also ==
- List of United States senators from Nebraska
- Nebraska's congressional delegations
- Nebraska's congressional districts
