= 1972 United States Senate election in Nebraska =

- November 7, 1972
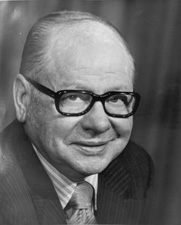

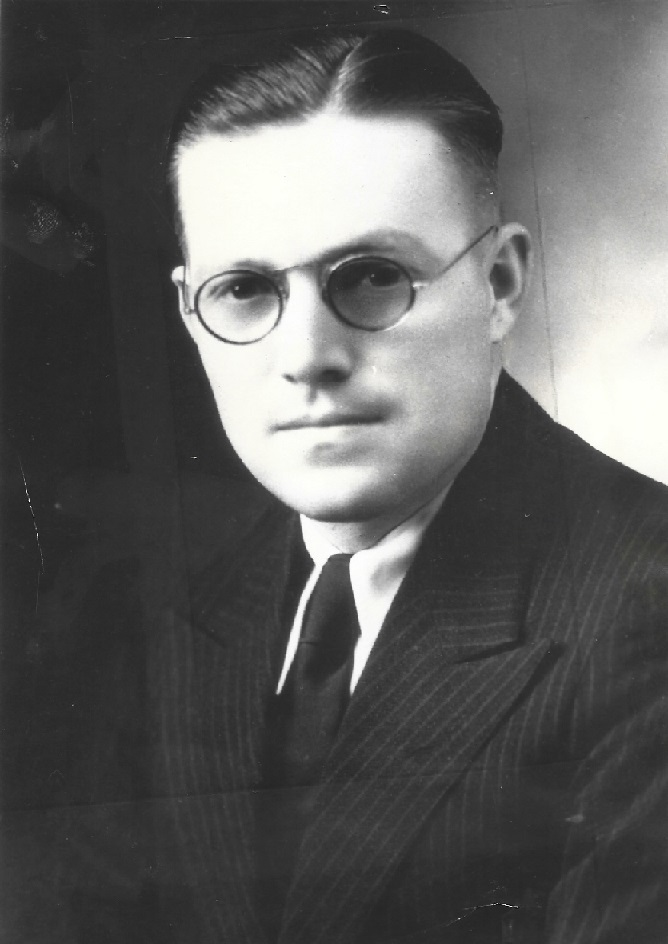
Nominee	Carl Curtis	Terry Carpenter
Party	Republican	Democratic
Popular vote	301,841	265,922
Percentage	53.09%	46.77%
- County results Curtis: 50–60% 60–70% 70–80% Carpenter: 50–60% 60–70%
U.S. senator before election
Carl Curtis
Republican
Elected U.S. Senator
Carl Curtis
Republican

The 1972 Nebraska United States Senate election was held on November 7, 1972. Incumbent Republican Senator Carl Curtis ran for re-election to a fourth term. He was challenged by State Senator and former Congressman Terry Carpenter, the Democratic nominee. Despite President Richard Nixon's landslide victory over Democratic challenger George McGovern in the presidential election in Nebraska, Curtis only defeated Carpenter with 53% of the vote, a narrower margin than many observers predicted. This was the last time until 1996 that a Republican won a U.S. Senate election in Nebraska.

== Democratic primary ==
=== Candidates ===
- Terry Carpenter, state senator, former U.S. representative from Nebraska's 5th congressional district
- John DeCamp, state senator
- Phillys Person Lyons, housewife
- Wallace C. Peterson, University of Nebraska–Lincoln economics professor
- Don Searcy, Kearney State College geography professor
- Wayne W. Ziebarth, state senator

=== Results ===
Democratic primary results
Party	Candidate	Votes	%
Democratic	Terry Carpenter	52,779	28.97%
Democratic	Wallace C. Peterson	49,569	27.21%
Democratic	Wayne W. Ziebarth	42,181	23.15%
Democratic	Don Searcy	25,854	14.19%
Democratic	John DeCamp	7,582	4.16%
Democratic	Phillys Person Lyons	4,121	2.26%
Democratic	Write-ins	90	0.05%
Total votes		182,176	100.00%

== Republican primary ==
=== Candidates ===
- Ronald L. Blauvelt, Thedford rancher
- Carl Curtis, incumbent senator
- Otis Glebe, Lincoln landlord
- Christine Millard Kneifl, former schoolteacher, widow of former State Attorney General Philip R. Kneifl

=== Results ===
Republican primary results
Party	Candidate	Votes	%
Republican	Carl T. Curtis (inc.)	141,213	74.04%
Republican	Ronald L. Blauvelt	30,138	15.80%
Republican	Christine Millard Kneifl	10,941	5.74%
Republican	Otis Glebe	8,143	4.27%
Republican	Write-ins	286	0.15%
Total votes		190,721	100.00%

== General election ==
1972 United States Senate election in Nebraska
Party	Candidate	Votes	%	±%
Republican	Carl Curtis (inc.)	301,841	53.09%	−7.95%
Democratic	Terry Carpenter	265,922	46.77%	+8.02%
Write-in		817	0.14%	—
Majority		35,919	6.32%	−15.98%
Total votes		568,580	100.00%	
Republican hold				
