= 1924 United States Senate election in Nebraska =

- November 4, 1924
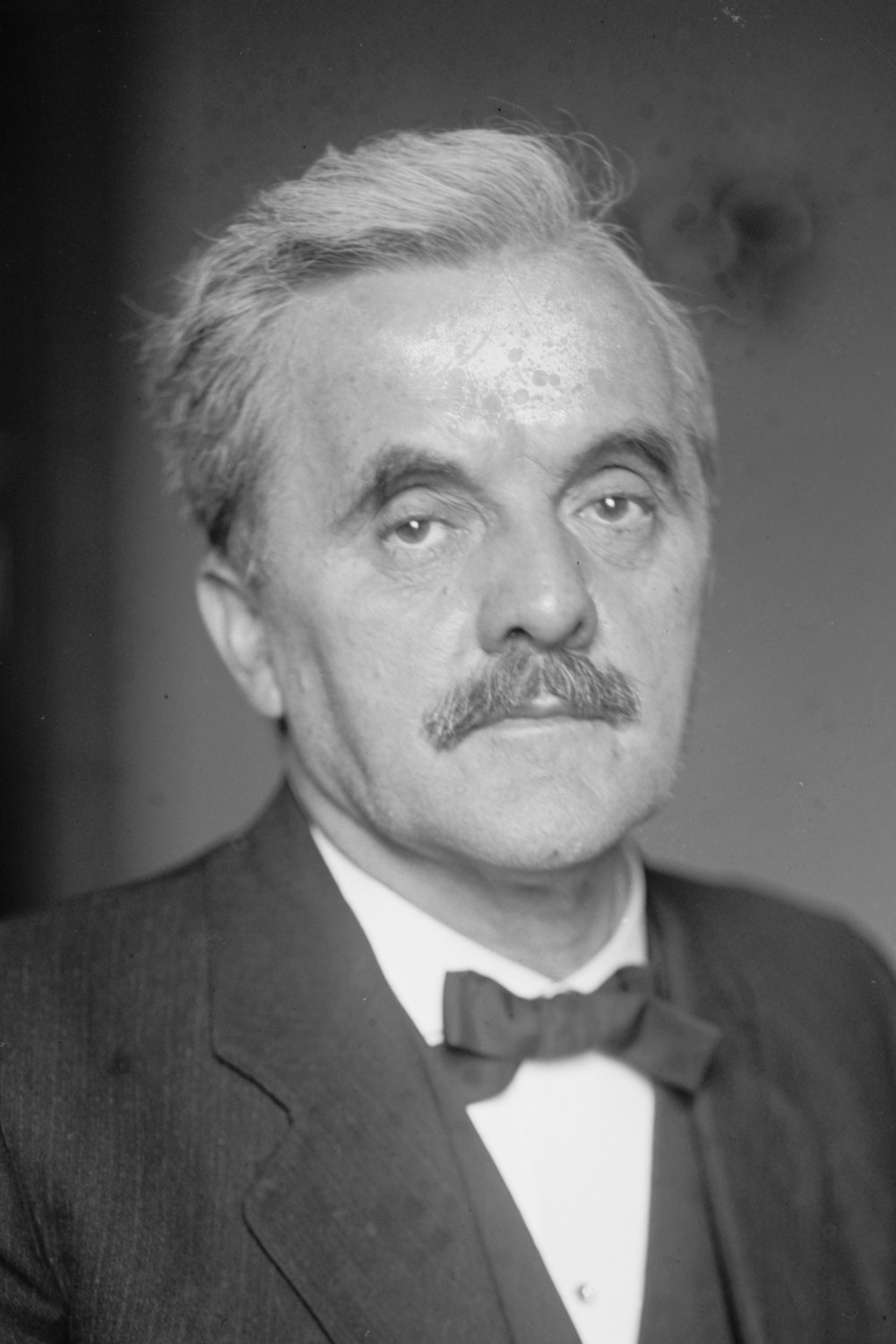

| Nominee | George W. Norris | John J. Thomas |
| Party | Republican | Democratic |
| Popular vote | 274,647 | 164,370 |
| Percentage | 62.56% | 37.44% |
- County results Norris: 50–60% 60–70% 70–80% Thomas: 50–60%
U.S. senator before election
George W. Norris
Republican
Elected U.S. Senator
George W. Norris
Republican

The 1924 United States Senate election in Nebraska took place on November 4, 1924. The incumbent Republican, George W. Norris, was re-elected by a wide margin to a third term. He defeated John J. Thomas. Norris overperformed Calvin Coolidge, who won the state with 47.09% in the presidential election.

== Republican primary ==
=== Candidates ===
- George W. Norris, incumbent Senator
- Fred G. Johnson, Lieutenant Governor of Nebraska
- Charles H. Sloan, former U.S. Representative from Nebraska's 4th congressional district

=== Results ===
Republican primary results
| Party | Candidate | Votes | % |
|---|---|---|---|
| Republican | George W. Norris (inc.) | 71,974 | 60.63% |
| Republican | Charles H. Sloan | 30,768 | 25.92% |
| Republican | Fred G. Johnson | 15,970 | 13.45% |
| Total votes | | 118,712 | 100.00% |

== Democratic primary ==
=== Candidates ===
- John J. Thomas, former Seward County Judge
- Kenneth W. McDonald, Bridgeport City School Board member, 1922 Democratic nominee for Attorney General
- D. C. Patterson, Omaha attorney
- Trenmore Cone, former State Representative

=== Results ===
Democratic primary results
| Party | Candidate | Votes | % |
|---|---|---|---|
| Democratic | John J. Thomas | 22,779 | 36.65% |
| Democratic | Kenneth W. McDonald | 19,890 | 32.00% |
| Democratic | Trenmore Cone | 10,404 | 16.74% |
| Democratic | D. C. Patterson | 8,983 | 14.45% |
| Democratic | Write-ins | 98 | 0.16% |
| Total votes | | 62,154 | 100.00% |

== Results ==
1924 United States Senate election in Nebraska
| Party | Candidate | Votes | % | ±% |
|---|---|---|---|---|
| Republican | George W. Norris (inc.) | 274,647 | 62.56% | +7.92% |
| Democratic | John J. Thomas | 164,370 | 37.44% | −7.92% |
| Write-in | | 14 | 0.00% | — |
| Majority | | 110,277 | 25.12% | +15.84% |
| Turnout | | 439,031 | | |
| Republican hold | | | | |
