= Terry Carpenter =

American politician

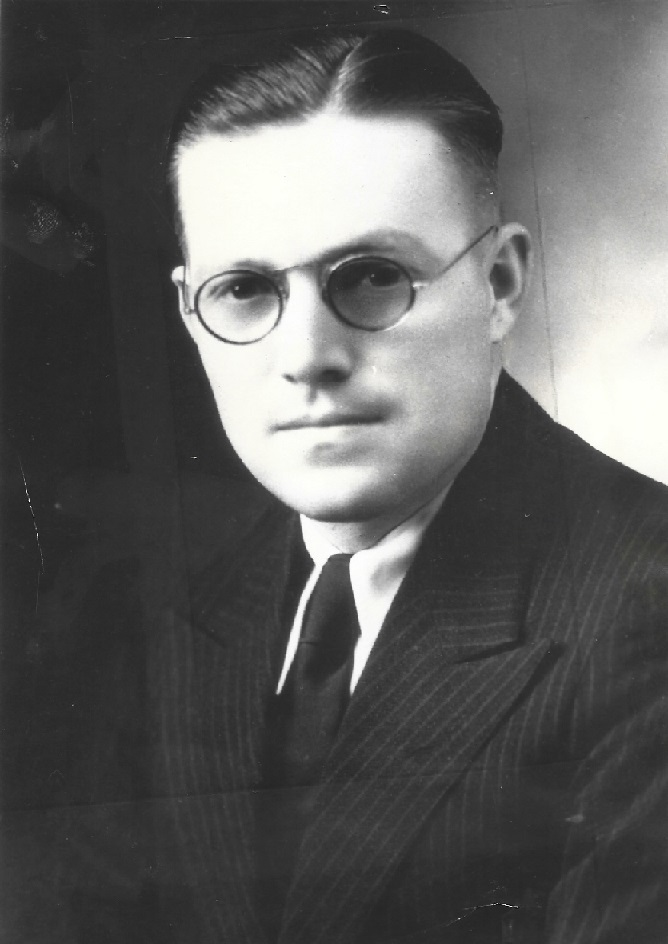
- Carpenter in 1934

Member of the U.S. House of Representatives from Nebraska's 5th district
- In office March 4, 1933 – January 3, 1935
- Preceded by: Ashton C. Shallenberger
- Succeeded by: Harry B. Coffee

Member of the Nebraska Legislature
- In office 1953–1955
- In office 1957–1961
- In office 1963–1974

Personal details
- Born: March 28, 1900 Cedar Rapids, Iowa, U.S.
- Died: April 27, 1978 (aged 78) Scottsbluff, Nebraska, U.S.
- Party: Democratic (c. 1932–50, 1972–74); Republican (c. 1954–60)
- Spouse: Hazeldeane Carruthers (m. 1930)
- Children: 3
- Parents: Burt C. Carpenter (father); Martha (mother)
- Occupation: Businessman; politician

Terry McGovern Carpenter (March 28, 1900 – April 27, 1978) was an American politician. Though he changed his party five times, he was elected as a Democrat to the United States House of Representatives and later served 22 years in the Nebraska Legislature. He also unsuccessfully ran for the Senate, Governor and Lieutenant Governor of Nebraska, and also unsuccessfully and then subsequently successfully for mayor of Scottsbluff, Nebraska. Carpenter was also a successful businessman and founded the village of Terrytown, Nebraska.

== Early life ==
Carpenter was born in Cedar Rapids, Iowa on March 28, 1900, the son of Burt and Martha Carpenter. He moved to Scottsbluff in 1916 and was employed in various capacities by a railroad company. From 1922 to 1923 he sold tobacco and candy, moving to Long Beach, California in 1923. There, he was the manager of the municipal gas and water department. He returned to Scottsbluff in 1927 where he worked in the garage business and the retail coal business.

After two brief marriages, Carpenter married Hazeldeane Carruthers on February 1, 1930, and they had three sons: Terry Jr., Gary, and Michael.

== Career ==
Carpenter ran unsuccessfully for mayor of Scottsbluff, Nebraska in 1931, but the next year was elected to the Seventy-third Congress (March 4, 1933 – January 3, 1935) as a Democrat for the 5th District. He did not run for reelection, since he was running for Governor of Nebraska in 1934. Failing to get the Democratic nomination, he next ran for a seat in the U.S. Senate but lost the election, coming in a distant third place with 18% of the vote, as he was running against the incumbent independent Republican George W. Norris and another Republican candidate. Norris won the election.

Carpenter continued to run for various offices unsuccessfully through the 1940s, but was a very successful businessman. He established the only gasoline refinery in Nebraska in Scottsbluff, with his own chain of gas stations in several states which created gas wars wherever they opened. He eventually sold this operation and started several new businesses.

Carpenter was a major in the United States Air Corps from 1942 to 1945 during World War II. He was elected mayor of Scottsbluff in 1947, but later stepped down due to perceived conflicts with his many businesses in the city. He founded a new village on the other side of the river from Scottsbluff in 1949 and called it Terrytown. He based his new businesses there, selling liquor by the drink before Scottsbluff did, starting a radio station, a drive-in movie theater, and two restaurants.

Carpenter changed political affiliation five times, being a delegate to the Republican National Convention in 1956. He was successful in being elected to the state legislature in 1952 and served 22 years as a state senator.

In 1970, Carpenter conducted much-publicized legislative hearings against a gay studies course being offered at the University of Nebraska–Lincoln. Carpenter considered homosexuality "a terrible disease" and believed that the college course would turn students gay. Carpenter attempted to expose the names of students taking the course. In 1971, he introduced legislation to prohibit courses pertaining to "aberrant" sexuality. It did not pass into law.

During his legislative career, he also operated Terry Carpenter, Inc., in Terrytown. He retired in Scottsbluff, Nebraska where he died April 27, 1978. He is buried in Fairview Cemetery in Scottsbluff.

== Campaign failures ==
Carpenter ran for but failed to be elected to the following offices:

- Mayor of Scottsbluff in 1931
- Democratic nomination for governor in 1934
- United States Senate in 1936
- Lieutenant governor in 1938
- Governor in 1940
- Democratic nomination for the United States Senate in 1942
- United States Senate in 1948
- Democratic nomination for governor in 1950
- Republican nomination for the United States Senate in 1954
- Republican nomination for governor in 1960
- United States Senate in 1972
- Democratic nomination for lieutenant governor in 1974

== Campaign successes ==
Carpenter was elected to the following offices:

- United States House of Representatives in 1932
- Mayor of Scottsbluff in 1947 (but later stepped down)
- Nebraska Legislature from District 48 (formerly District 42) as a Republican in 1952, 1956, 1958, 1962, 1964, 1966, and 1970

== Sources ==
1. "Carpenter, Terry McGovern". The Political Graveyard.
2. "Carpenter, Terry McGovern". Biographical Directory of the United States Congress.

U.S. House of Representatives
Preceded by Ashton C. Shallenberger (D)	Member of the U.S. House of Representatives from Nebraska's 5th congressional district March 4, 1933 – January 3, 1935	Succeeded by Harry B. Coffee (D)
Party political offices
Preceded by Gilbert Hitchcock	Democratic nominee for U.S. Senator (Class 2) from Nebraska; 1936	Succeeded by Foster May
Preceded by Robert L. Cochran	Democratic nominee for Governor of Nebraska; 1940	Succeeded by Charles W. Bryan
Preceded by Foster May	Democratic nominee for U.S. Senator (Class 2) from Nebraska; 1948	Succeeded by William Ritchie
Preceded by Frank B. Morrison	Democratic nominee for U.S. Senator (Class 2) from Nebraska; 1972	Succeeded by J. James Exon
