= Ashton C. Shallenberger =

American politician (1862–1938)

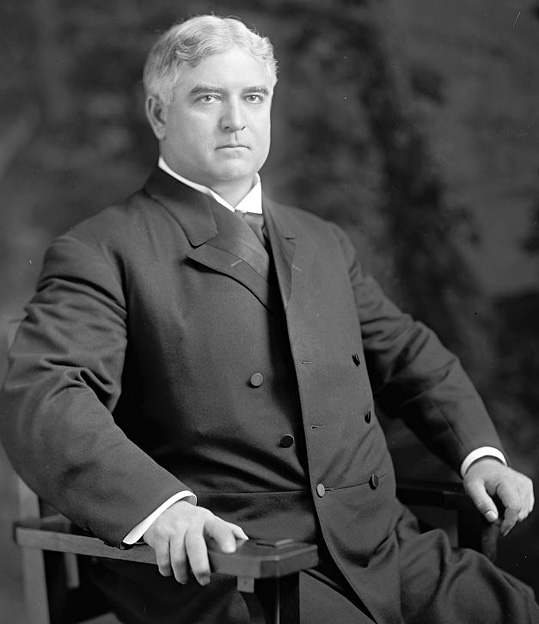

15th Governor of Nebraska
- In office January 7, 1909 – January 5, 1911
- Lieutenant: Melville R. Hopewell
- Preceded by: George L. Sheldon
- Succeeded by: Chester Hardy Aldrich

Member of the U.S. House of Representatives from Nebraska's 4th district
- In office March 4, 1933 – January 3, 1935
- Preceded by: John N. Norton
- Succeeded by: Charles Gustav Binderup

Member of the U.S. House of Representatives from Nebraska's 5th district
- In office March 4, 1931 – March 3, 1933
- Preceded by: Fred Gustus Johnson
- Succeeded by: Terry Carpenter
- In office March 4, 1923 – March 3, 1929
- Preceded by: William E. Andrews
- Succeeded by: Fred Gustus Johnson
- In office March 4, 1915 – March 3, 1919
- Preceded by: Silas Reynolds Barton
- Succeeded by: William E. Andrews
- In office March 4, 1901 – March 3, 1903
- Preceded by: Roderick D. Sutherland
- Succeeded by: George W. Norris

Personal details
- Born: Ashton Cokayne Shallenberger; December 23, 1862 Toulon, Illinois, US
- Died: February 22, 1938 (aged 75) Franklin, Nebraska, US
- Party: Democratic
- Spouse: Eliza Zilg
- Children: 3
- Education: University of Illinois at Urbana Champaign
- Profession: Politician

Ashton Cokayne Shallenberger (December 23, 1862 – February 22, 1938) was an American Democratic politician and the 15th governor of Nebraska from 1909 to 1911.

== Early life and education ==
Shallenberger was born in Toulon, Illinois, on December 23, 1862. He was educated in the public schools and attended the University of Illinois at Urbana–Champaign. He was married to Eliza Zilg in 1885 and they had three children.

== Career ==
After a move to Stromsburg, Polk County, Nebraska, in 1881, Shallenberger became a clerk, a banker and a rancher. He moved to Alma, Harlan County, Nebraska, in 1887 and founded the Bank of Alma. He was first elected to the 57th United States Congress but failed to be reelected in 1902.

According to Southwest Virginia folklore, in 1902 Shallenberger, Alma Journal editor H. S. Wetherald, and carriage dealer Frank Griggsby, were startled by the apparition of a Woman in Black.

His first attempt at the Governorship came in 1906, running under a Fusion label of the state Democratic and Populist parties, where he lost to Republican George L. Sheldon. He was then elected governor in 1908, defeating Sheldon in a narrowly won rematch. Shallenberger served from 1909 to 1911, his tenure included the adoption of the State Guarantee of Deposits Law and the "Oregon Plan", a direct primary bill regarding the election of United States senators. He lost an attempt at a second term in 1910, losing in the Democratic primary to James Charles Dahlman.

Unsuccessful in running for Senate from Nebraska in 1912, Shallenberger was elected a congressman to the 64th and 65th congresses (1915–1919), but was unsuccessful in being reelected to the 66th in 1918. He was a delegate to the Democratic National Convention in 1920, and was elected to the 68th, 69th, and 70th congresses from 1923 to 1929. Unsuccessful in being reelected to the 71st in 1929, but was successful in running for the 72nd and 73rd (1931–1935). He failed to be renominated in 1934 and returned to banking and breeding shorthorn cattle. Shallenberger was one of four governors (three of Nebraska, one of Wyoming) to come from the city of Osceola, Nebraska.

== Death ==
Shallenberger died on February 22, 1938.

Party political offices
Preceded by George W. Berge	Democratic nominee for Governor of Nebraska; 1906, 1908	Succeeded by James Dahlman
First	Democratic nominee for U.S. Senator from Nebraska (Class 2); 1913	Succeeded by John H. Morehead
U.S. House of Representatives
Preceded by Roderick Dhu Sutherland (Populist)	Member of the U.S. House of Representatives from Nebraska's 5th congressional district 1901 – 1903	Succeeded by George W. Norris (R)
Preceded by Silas Reynolds Barton (R)	Member of the U.S. House of Representatives from Nebraska's 5th congressional district 1915 – 1919	Succeeded by William E. Andrews (R)
Preceded by William E. Andrews (R)	Member of the U.S. House of Representatives from Nebraska's 5th congressional district 1923 – 1929	Succeeded by Fred Gustus Johnson (R)
Preceded by Fred Gustus Johnson (R)	Member of the U.S. House of Representatives from Nebraska's 5th congressional district 1931 – 1933	Succeeded by Terry Carpenter (D)
Preceded by John N. Norton (D)	Member of the U.S. House of Representatives from Nebraska's 4th congressional district 1933 – 1935	Succeeded by Charles Gustav Binderup (D)
Political offices
Preceded by George L. Sheldon	Governor of Nebraska; 1909 – 1911	Succeeded by Chester H. Aldrich
