= William E. Andrews =

American politician

William Ezekiel Andrews
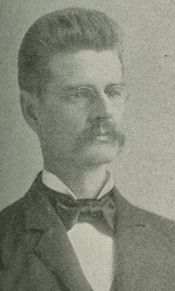

Member of the U.S. House of Representatives from Nebraska's 5th district
- In office March 4, 1895 – March 3, 1897
- Preceded by: William A. McKeighan
- Succeeded by: Roderick Dhu Sutherland
- In office March 4, 1919 – March 3, 1923
- Preceded by: Ashton C. Shallenberger
- Succeeded by: Ashton C. Shallenberger

Personal details
- Born: December 17, 1854 Oskaloosa, Iowa, US
- Died: January 19, 1942 (aged 87) Washington, D.C., US
- Party: Republican
- Education: Simpson College Parsons College
- Profession: Educator; Politician

William Ezekiel Andrews (December 17, 1854 – January 19, 1942) was an American politician who was a United States representative from Nebraska from 1895 to 1897.

== Biography ==
Andrews was born near Oskaloosa, Iowa, on December 17, 1854. He became an orphan early in life. He worked as a farm hand to get by and attended the country schools in winter. He graduated from Simpson College in 1874 and from Parsons College in 1875.

== Career ==
Andrews was elected superintendent of schools of Ringgold County, Iowa, in 1879. He became part of the faculty at Hastings College in Nebraska on January 1, 1885, and taught to January 1, 1893. He then was elected vice president of Hastings College in 1889 and president of the Nebraska State Teachers’ Association in 1890.

After an unsuccessful run for the Fifty-third Congress in 1892, Andrews served as a private secretary to the Governor of Nebraska, Lorenzo Crounse in 1893 and 1894. Running against William A. McKeighan, he was successful in being elected as a Republican to the Fifty-fourth Congress and served from March 4, 1895, to March 3, 1897. He ran for reelection in 1896 and lost to Roderick Dhu Sutherland.

Andrews was an auditor for the U.S. Treasury Department from 1897 to 1915 in Washington D.C. He ran again for the 5th district seat and won, being elected to the 66th and 67th congresses and serving from March 4, 1919, to March 3, 1923. During his time in the 67th Congress, he was the chair of the U.S. House Committee on the Election of the President, Vice President and Representatives in Congress. He was unsuccessful in running against former Nebraska governor Ashton C. Shallenberger in 1922.

== Death ==
Having lived out the rest of his life in Washington, D.C., Andrews died on January 19, 1942.

== Sources ==
- "Andrews, William Ezekiel". The Political Graveyard.
- "Andrews, William Ezekiel". Biographical Directory of the United States Congress.

U.S. House of Representatives
Preceded by William A. McKeighan (P)	Member of the U.S. House of Representatives from Nebraska's 5th congressional district March 4, 1895 – March 3, 1897	Succeeded by Roderick Dhu Sutherland (P)
Preceded by Ashton C. Shallenberger (D)	Member of the U.S. House of Representatives from Nebraska's 5th congressional district March 4, 1919 – March 3, 1923	Succeeded by Ashton C. Shallenberger (D)
