= William A. McKeighan =

American politician

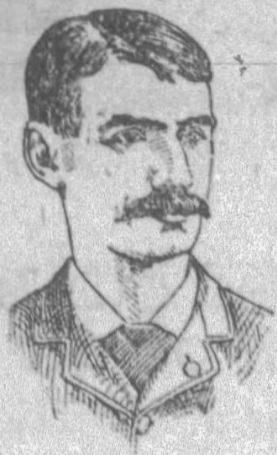
- Lincoln Evening Call, January 4, 1891

Member of the U.S. House of Representatives from Nebraska
- In office March 4, 1891 – March 3, 1895
- Preceded by: Gilbert L. Laws (2nd); District established (5th)
- Succeeded by: David Henry Mercer (2nd); William E. Andrews (5th)
- Constituency: 2nd district (1891-93); 5th district (1893-95)

Personal details
- Born: January 19, 1842 Millville, New Jersey
- Died: December 15, 1895 (aged 53) Hastings, Nebraska
- Party: Populist

William Arthur McKeighan (January 19, 1842 – December 15, 1895) was an American politician.

McKeighan was born in Millville, New Jersey. He moved with his parents to Fulton County, Illinois, in 1848. He enlisted in the 11th Regiment Illinois Volunteer Cavalry, in September 1861, to fight in the Civil War. When the war ended he was stationed on a farm near Pontiac, Illinois. He decided to take up farming. He moved to Nebraska in 1880 and continued farming near Red Cloud, Nebraska.

McKeighan started to take interest in creating the Farmers' Alliance and was elected Probate Judge of Webster County from 1885 to 1887. He ran unsuccessfully for U.S. Representative in the 1888 election. He ran and won the 2nd district seat in 1890. Following the results of the 1890 census being apportioned, McKeighan ran for the newly created 5th district in 1892 and won again. He ran and lost for reelection in 1894, and died in Hastings, Nebraska, on December 15, 1895. He is interred in Red Cloud Cemetery, Red Cloud, Nebraska

U.S. House of Representatives
| Preceded by Gilbert L. Laws (R) | Member of the U.S. House of Representatives from Nebraska's 2nd congressional district March 4, 1891 – March 3, 1893 | Succeeded by David Henry Mercer (R) |
| Preceded by Seat created | Member of the U.S. House of Representatives from Nebraska's 5th congressional district March 4, 1893 – March 3, 1895 | Succeeded by William E. Andrews (R) |
