= Gilbert L. Laws =

American politician

Gilbert Lafayette Laws
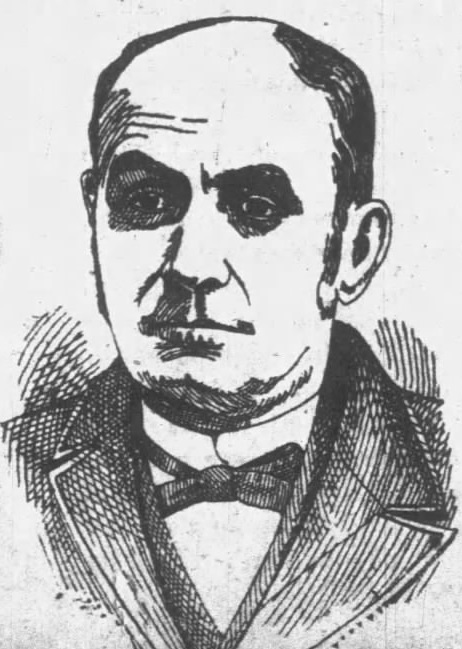
- The Aurora Republican (Aurora, NE), October 25, 1889

Member of the U.S. House of Representatives from Nebraska's 2nd district
- In office December 2, 1889 – March 3, 1891
- Preceded by: James Laird
- Succeeded by: William A. McKeighan

Secretary of State of Nebraska
- In office 1886–1888
- Governor: James W. Dawes; John Milton Thayer
- Preceded by: Edward P. Roggen
- Succeeded by: Benjamin R. Cowdery

Personal details
- Born: March 11, 1838 Olney, Illinois, U.S.
- Died: April 25, 1907 (aged 69) Lincoln, Nebraska, U.S.
- Resting place: Wyuka Cemetery, Lincoln, Nebraska
- Party: Republican
- Spouse: Josephine Lawrence Laws
- Children: Gertrude H. Laws; Theodosia C. Laws; Helen Lucile Laws
- Education: Haskell University; Milton College
- Occupation: Manufacturer; Politician; Newspaper publisher Businessman

Military service
- Allegiance: United States
- Branch/service: United States Volunteers; Union Army
- Years of service: 1861-1862
- Rank: Sergeant, USV
- Unit: 5th Reg. Wis. Vol. Infantry
- Battles/wars: American Civil War: Peninsula campaign; Battle of Williamsburg (WIA)

Gilbert Lafayette Laws (March 11, 1838 – April 25, 1907) was an American politician, newspaper publisher and businessman. He served as the Nebraska secretary of state and as a member of the United States House of Representatives during the 1800s.

== Early life ==
Born on a farm near Olney, Illinois, Laws was the son of James Laws and Lucinda (Calhoun) Laws. In 1845, he moved to Iowa County, Wisconsin, with his parents. He attended Haskell University and Milton College which he financed by working in the lumber business during the summers. After graduation, he taught school until 1861 in Richland Center, Wisconsin.

During the American Civil War, Laws enlisted in the 5th Wisconsin Infantry Regiment. His left leg was amputated below the knee as a result of being wounded in the Battle of Williamsburg on May 5, 1862. He was discharged in July 1862 and settled in Richland County, Wisconsin.

== Career ==
Laws was elected as the Richland County Clerk in 1862 and reelected twice. While serving as county clerk, he also published the Republican newspaper, "Richland County Observer". After selling his share of the newspaper in 1864, he manufactured lumber, wagon materials and bedsteads. He was a member of the Richland Center, Wisconsin city council in 1868 and 1869, and the city's mayor in 1869. In 1869 and 1870, he was the chairman of the county board of supervisors and from 1866 to 1876 the postmaster. He resigned his posts in 1876 and moved to Orleans, Nebraska.

Laws moved to Nebraska in 1876. In 1883, Laws was appointed register of the United States General Land Office in McCook, Nebraska. He served in that position until November 1, 1886, when he was elected Secretary of State of Nebraska. He was Secretary of State until 1888.

Elected as a Republican candidate to the 51st United States Congress to fill the vacancy caused by the death of James Laird, Laws served as a United States representative for the second district of Nebraska from December 2, 1889, to March 3, 1891.

He did not run for reelection, instead moving to Enid, Oklahoma, where he sold real estate. He returned to Lincoln, Nebraska, in 1895, and became secretary of the State board of transportation from 1896 to 1900.

== Death ==
Laws died on April 25, 1907 (age 69 years, 45 days), in Lincoln, Nebraska. He is interred at Wyuka Cemetery in Lincoln.

== Personal life ==
Laws married Josephine Lawrence on October 25, 1868. They had three daughters, Gertrude H. Laws, Theodosia C. Laws and Helen Lucile Laws.

U.S. House of Representatives
Preceded by James Laird (R)	Member of the U.S. House of Representatives from Nebraska's 2nd congressional district December 2, 1889 – March 3, 1891	Succeeded by William A. McKeighan (P)
Political offices
Preceded by Edward P. Roggen	Secretary of State of Nebraska; 1886-1888	Succeeded by Benjamin R. Cowdery
