= James Laird (politician) =

American politician

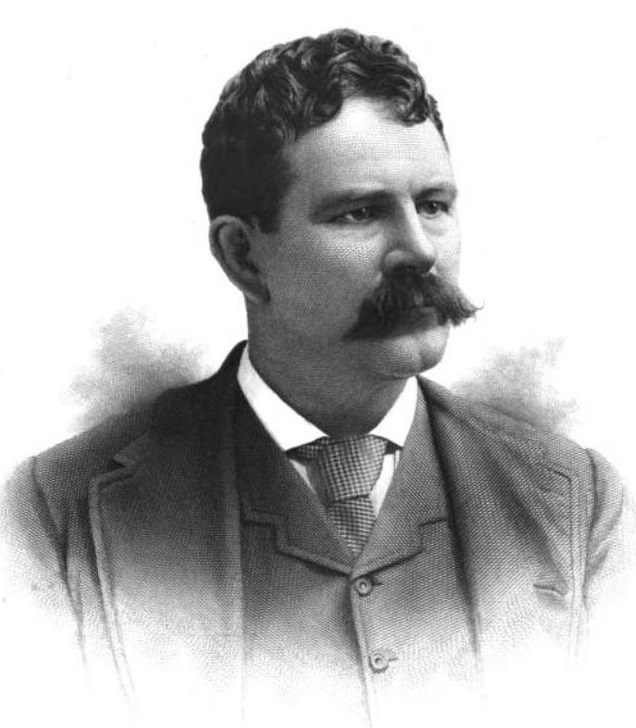

Member of the U.S. House of Representatives from Nebraska's 2nd district
- In office March 4, 1883 – August 17, 1889
- Preceded by: District created
- Succeeded by: Gilbert L. Laws

Personal details
- Born: June 20, 1849 Fowlerville, New York
- Died: August 17, 1889 (aged 40) Hastings, Nebraska
- Party: Republican
- Education: University of Michigan Law School

James Laird (June 20, 1849 – August 17, 1889) was an American Republican Party politician.

Laird was born in Fowlerville, New York, and moved with his parents to Hillsdale County, Michigan. He attended Adrian College and enlisted at thirteen in the Sixteenth Regiment of the Michigan Volunteer Infantry in the Army of the Potomac during the American Civil War. At Gaines' Mill, a musket ball struck him in the breast; he was taken prisoner and held for six weeks at Libby Prison before being exchanged. Later he served at Chancellorsville and Gettysburg, and, after re-enlisting in 1864, took part in the Petersburg campaign. Over three years, from 1862 to 1865, he was wounded five times, and rose to the rank of major by the time he was seventeen. His two brothers both died in the war. He graduated from the law department of the University of Michigan at Ann Arbor and was admitted to the bar.

He set up practice in Hastings, Nebraska, in 1872 and was a member of the Nebraska constitutional convention of 1875. He was elected as a Republican to fill the newly created 2nd district seat to the U.S. House of Representatives to the Forty-eighth United States Congress. He supported the moderate coinage of silver and favored revision of the high protective tariff, but not to the extent that would make him support either the Morrison tariff bill of 1886 or the Mills tariff bill of 1888. In that respect, he stayed safely in the good graces of the national party, and beat Democratic challengers easily, even with Prohibition third party candidates carrying somewhere between three and ten percent of the vote in a congressional race. As a member of the Military Affairs Committee, he pushed through a bill to make provision for homes for disabled soldiers in every state in the Union. He also served on the Pensions committee. As one senator said later, "No ex-soldier ever appealed to him in vain, and his generous nature could refuse nothing to the suffering or dependent." Breaking with other members of the Republican party, Laird strove to clear the name of General Fitz John Porter, who had been his old commanding general. "There was in his voice the sound of the ring of the saber," Congressman Byron Cutcheon of Michigan commented, "there was in his utterances the rattle of small arms in battle." Certainly one fellow congressman had cause to feel so that summer, when Laird took out a grievance by socking him in the mouth.

He was re-elected three times serving from March 4, 1883, but after his re-election in 1888 had a nervous breakdown, complicated by insomnia; as a result, he never took his seat in the lame-duck session of the Fiftieth Congress and had no chance to attend the Congress that followed it. He died on August 17, 1889, in Hastings, aged 40. Laird is buried in Hastings' Parkview Cemetery.

Laird is the namesake of the community of Laird, Colorado.

== See also ==
- List of members of the United States Congress who died in office (1790–1899)

== Notes ==
U.S. House of Representatives
Preceded by Seat Created	Member of the U.S. House of Representatives from Nebraska's 2nd congressional district March 4, 1883 – August 17, 1889	Succeeded by Gilbert L. Laws (R)
