= Charles Binderup =

American politician (1873–1950)

Charles Gustav Binderup
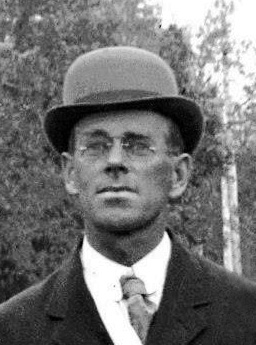
- Portrait of Charles Binderup in 1911, extracted from a photo of the Minden, Nebraska Band

Member of the U.S. House of Representatives from Nebraska's 4th congressional district
- In office January 3, 1935 – January 3, 1939
- Preceded by: Ashton C. Shallenberger
- Succeeded by: Carl Curtis

Personal details
- Born: March 5, 1873 Horsens, Denmark
- Died: August 19, 1950 (aged 77) Minden, Nebraska, US
- Spouse: Elena Westengaard Binderup
- Education: Grand Island Business College
- Profession: Farmer; Merchant; Realtor; Politician

Charles Gustav Binderup (March 5, 1873 – August 19, 1950) was a Nebraska Democratic politician. He served as United States Congressman from 1935 to 1939.

== Early life ==
Binderup was born in Horsens, Denmark, son of George Werner Binderup and Laurentza Bjerring. When he was six months old, his parents immigrated to the United States, settling on a farm near Hastings, Nebraska. He attended Grand Island Business College and farmed near Hastings and Minden, Nebraska. He married Elena Westengaard on September 18, 1900, and they had three children.

== Career ==
Binderup was in the mercantile and creamery business in Minden.

Binderup was elected as a Democrat to the Seventy-fourth and Seventy-fifth Congresses and served from January 3, 1935, to January 3, 1939. He failed to be reelected in 1938. He ran as an independent for the Seventy-seventh Congress but was defeated again. He helped organize the Constitutional Money League of America in Minden.

== Death ==
Binderup died in Minden on August 19, 1950.

U.S. House of Representatives
| Preceded by Ashton C. Shallenberger (D) | Member of the U.S. House of Representatives from Nebraska's 4th congressional district January 3, 1935 – January 3, 1939 | Succeeded by Carl Curtis (R) |
