= Roderick D. Sutherland =

American politician

Roderick Dhu Sutherland
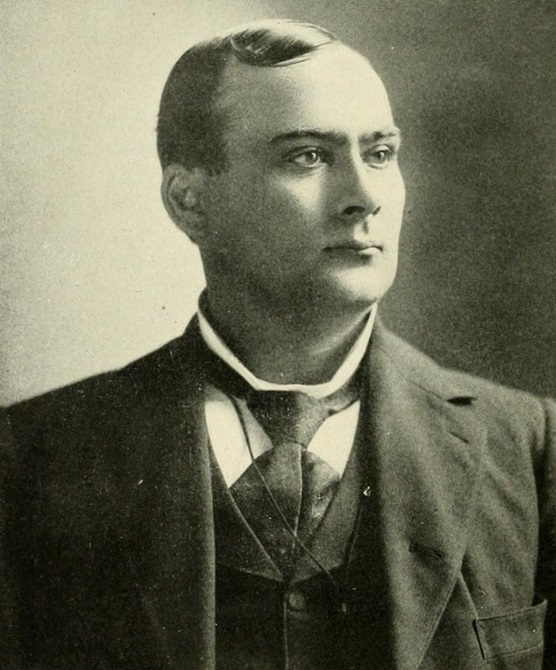
- From Volume 2 (1899) of Autobiographies and Portraits of the President, Cabinet, Supreme Court, and Fifty-fifth Congress

Member of the U.S. House of Representatives from Nebraska's 5th district
- In office March 4, 1897 – March 3, 1901
- Preceded by: William E. Andrews
- Succeeded by: Ashton C. Shallenberger

Personal details
- Born: April 27, 1862 Scotch Grove, Iowa, US
- Died: October 18, 1915 (aged 53) Kansas City, Kansas, US
- Party: Populist

Roderick Dhu Sutherland (April 27, 1862 – October 18, 1915) was an American Populist Party politician.

Sutherland was born in Scotch Grove, Iowa, and attended Amity College, in College Springs, Iowa. He taught school and studied law, being admitted to the bar in 1888. He set up practice in Nelson, Nebraska, becoming the prosecuting attorney of Nuckolls County 1890 until 1896.

Sutherland served as the chairman of the Populist state convention in Nebraska in 1899. He then was appointed by governor William A. Poynter as a delegate to the trust conference held in Chicago in September 1899. He was elected as a Populist to the Fifty-fifth and Fifty-sixth Congresses (March 4, 1897 – March 3, 1901), but failed at being reelected to the Fifty-seventh Congress in November 1900. He was a delegate to the Populist National Convention and a delegate to the 1900 Democratic National Convention and the 1908 Democratic National Convention.

After his Congressional service, Sutherland resumed practice of law in Nelson, and died in Kansas City, Kansas, in 1915. His remains were interred in Nelson Cemetery, Nelson, Nebraska.

He was married to Ana Marie Laramor.

U.S. House of Representatives
Preceded by William E. Andrews (R)	Member of the U.S. House of Representatives from Nebraska's 5th congressional district March 4, 1897 – March 3, 1901	Succeeded by Ashton C. Shallenberger (D)
