= Silas Reynolds Barton =

American politician

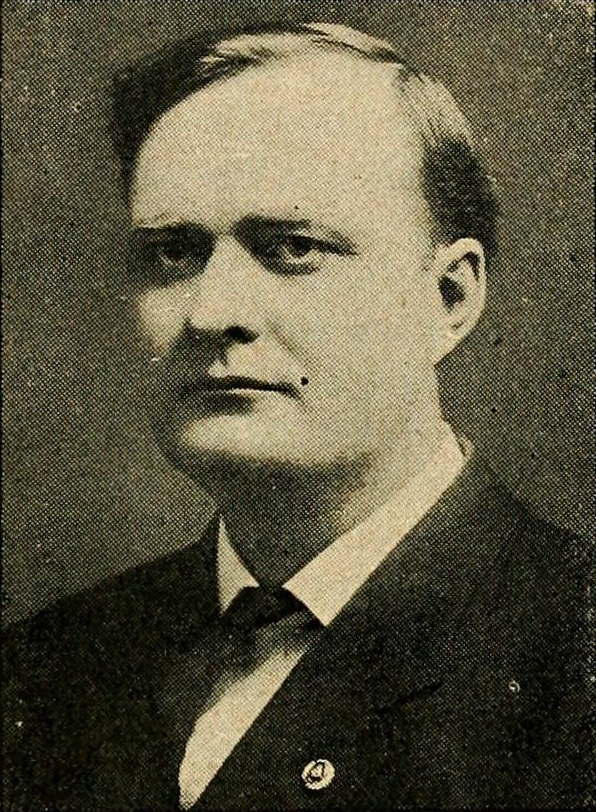
- From 1920s History of Hall County, Nebraska

Member of the U.S. House of Representatives from Nebraska's 5th district
- In office March 4, 1913 – March 3, 1915
- Preceded by: George W. Norris
- Succeeded by: Ashton C. Shallenberger

Nebraska Auditor of Public Accounts
- In office January 7, 1909 – January 9, 1913
- Governor: Ashton C. Shallenberger; Chester Hardy Aldrich
- Preceded by: Edward N. Searle Jr.
- Succeeded by: W. B. Howard

Personal details
- Born: May 21, 1872 New London, Iowa, US
- Died: November 7, 1916 (aged 44) Grand Island, Nebraska, US
- Party: Republican
- Spouse: Ellen Tazwell Metcalfe Barton Conant
- Children: Silas Barton Jr.
- Education: Peru State Normal School, Nebraska
- Profession: Farmer, teacher, politician

Silas Reynolds Barton (May 21, 1872 – November 7, 1916) was an American politician. A Republican, he represented Nebraska's 5th congressional district for one term in the United States House of Representatives.

== Biography ==
Barton was born in New London, Iowa on May 21, 1872, the son of Eli B. Barton and Teressa (Nugen) Barton. He moved with his parents to Hamilton County, Nebraska in 1873, and graduated from Aurora High School. He attended Peru State College. He married Adah Michell and had two children who died in infancy. After his first wife's death in 1909, he married Ellen Tazwell Metcalfe and had a son.

== Career ==
Barton was a farmer and teacher. From 1898 until 1901, he was the deputy treasurer of Hamilton County. In 1901, he became the grand recorder of the Ancient Order of United Workmen and served in that capacity until 1908. He was president for two terms of the Grand Recorders' Association of the United States.

Barton became the Nebraska State Auditor in 1909 and served until his election to the United States Congress in 1913. During his two terms as auditor he was an insurance commissioner and a member of the National Executive Committee of Insurance Commissioners.

Elected in 1913 to the 63rd Congress, Barton was in office from March 4, 1913, until March 3, 1915. He ran for the 65th Congress, but died before the election.

== Death ==
Barton died in Grand Island, Nebraska, on November 7, 1916, at the age of 44. He is interred at Aurora Cemetery in Aurora, Nebraska.

U.S. House of Representatives
Preceded by George W. Norris (R)	Member of the U.S. House of Representatives from Nebraska's 5th congressional district March 4, 1913 – March 3, 1915	Succeeded by Ashton C. Shallenberger (D)
