= Harry B. Coffee =

American politician (1890–1972)

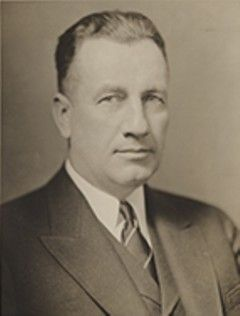
- Circa 1936. Collection of the U.S. House of Representatives.

Member of the U.S. House of Representatives from Nebraska's 5th district
- In office January 3, 1935 – January 3, 1943
- Preceded by: Terry Carpenter
- Succeeded by: District abolished

Personal details
- Born: March 16, 1890 Harrison, Nebraska, U.S.
- Died: October 3, 1972 (aged 82) Omaha, Nebraska, U.S.
- Party: Democratic

Harry Buffington Coffee (March 16, 1890 – October 3, 1972) was an American Democratic Party politician.

Born near Harrison, Nebraska on March 16, 1890, a son of Samuel Buffington Coffee and May Elizabeth Tisdale. Harry graduated from the University of Nebraska in 1913. He sold real estate and insurance in Chadron, Nebraska from 1914 to 1939. During World War I he was a second lieutenant in the Air Service in 1917 and 1918. He organized the Coffee Cattle Co., Inc. in 1915 which owned many ranches in Sioux County, Nebraska. He also did some farming.

He was elected as a Democrat to the Seventy-fourth Congress and reelected to the next three Congresses, serving from January 3, 1935, to January 3, 1943. He ran for the Senate in 1942 when his seat was merged and done away with, but he failed to obtain the nomination.

He became a president of a stockyard company and a terminal railway company from 1943 until 1961. In 1961 he was named chairman of the board of the company. He died in Omaha, Nebraska on October 3, 1972. He is buried in Forest Lawn Cemetery in Omaha. He was a member of the Methodist Church and a Freemason.

U.S. House of Representatives
Preceded by Terry Carpenter (D)	Member of the U.S. House of Representatives from Nebraska's 5th congressional district January 3, 1935 – January 3, 1943	Succeeded by Seat became obsolete
