= David Henry Mercer =

American politician

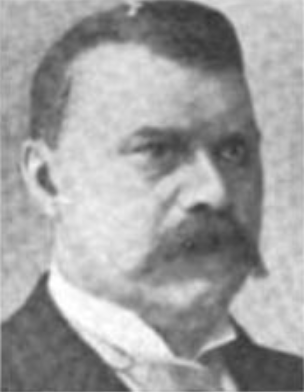

Member of the U.S. House of Representatives from Nebraska's 2nd district
- In office March 4, 1893 – March 3, 1903
- Preceded by: William A. McKeighan
- Succeeded by: Gilbert Hitchcock

Personal details
- Born: July 9, 1857 Benton County, Iowa
- Died: January 10, 1919 (aged 61) Omaha, Nebraska
- Party: Republican
- Education: University of Michigan

David Henry Mercer (July 9, 1857 – January 10, 1919) was an American Republican Party politician.

Born in Benton County, Iowa, on July 9, 1857, he moved with his parents to Adams County, Illinois, in 1858. After the American Civil War he moved again to Brownville, Nebraska. He graduated from the University of Nebraska in 1880 and the law department of University of Michigan in Ann Arbor, Michigan, in 1882. He was admitted to the bar and set up practice back in Brownville serving one term as city clerk and police judge.

He moved to Omaha, Nebraska, in 1885 and was for several years was chairman of the Republican city and county committees. He was the secretary of the Republican State central committee in 1896 and elected secretary of the Republican National Congressional Committee in the same year. In 1897 he was chairman of the Republican State Central committee of Nebraska in 1897 and 1898.

He was elected as a Republican to the Fifty-third United States Congress and to the four succeeding Congresses serving from March 4, 1893, to March 3, 1903. During his time as representatives, he was chairman of the U.S. House Committee on Public Buildings and Grounds during the Fifty-fifth, Fifty-sixth, and Fifty-seventh Congresses. He unsuccessfully ran for reelection in 1902. Afterwards, he settled in Washington, D.C., resuming his practice of law. He died in Omaha on January 10, 1919, and is buried in Forest Lawn Cemetery in Omaha.

U.S. House of Representatives
Preceded by William A. McKeighan (P)	Member of the U.S. House of Representatives from Nebraska's 2nd congressional district March 4, 1893 – March 3, 1903	Succeeded by Gilbert Hitchcock (D)
