= Fred Gustus Johnson =

American politician

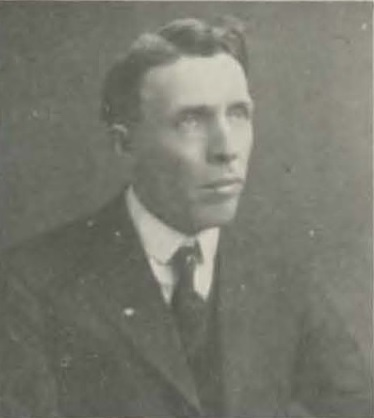
- From the Nebraska Blue Book for 1920-1921

Member of the U.S. House of Representatives from Nebraska's 5th district
- In office March 4, 1929 – March 3, 1931
- Preceded by: Ashton C. Shallenberger
- Succeeded by: Ashton C. Shallenberger

17th Lieutenant Governor of Nebraska
- In office 1923–1925
- Governor: Charles W. Bryan
- Preceded by: Pelham A. Barrows
- Succeeded by: George A. Williams

Fred Gustus Johnson (October 16, 1876 – April 30, 1951) was a Nebraska Republican politician.

Born on a farm near Dorchester, Nebraska on October 16, 1876, his father was a native of Sweden. Graduated from Dorchester High School in 1893 and from the University of Nebraska College of Law in 1903 and admitted to the bar in the same year. He set up practice in his home town Dorchester, also doing a little farming on the side. He moved to Oxford, Nebraska in 1909, and to Hastings, Nebraska in 1911 still practicing law.

He was a delegate to the Republican State convention from 1900 to 1938. He was elected a member of the Nebraska state house of representatives from 1907 to 1909 and again from 1917 to 1919. He was a member of the state senate in 1919 to 1920. He became the 17th lieutenant governor of Nebraska from 1923 to 1925 serving under Governor Charles W. Bryan. He was then elected to the represent Nebraska's 5th district to the Seventy-first Congress (March 4, 1929 – March 3, 1931). He ran in 1930 and 1932, but failed to be reelected.

From 1931 to 1933 he sold homes and engaged in law, and in 1934 to 1938 he ran an agricultural-industrial enterprise in Hastings, moving the business to Charleston, Mississippi from 1941 to 1943. He was elected one last time to become a judge of Adams County, Nebraska from 1945, being reelected in 1948 and serving until his death in Hastings on April 30, 1951. Buried in Parkview Cemetery, in Hastings.

Political offices
Preceded by Pelham A. Barrows	Lieutenant Governor of Nebraska; 1923 – 1925	Succeeded by George A. Williams
U.S. House of Representatives
Preceded by Ashton C. Shallenberger (D)	Member of the U.S. House of Representatives from Nebraska's 5th congressional district March 4, 1929 – March 3, 1931	Succeeded by Ashton C. Shallenberger (D)
