= George W. Norris =

American politician (1861–1944)

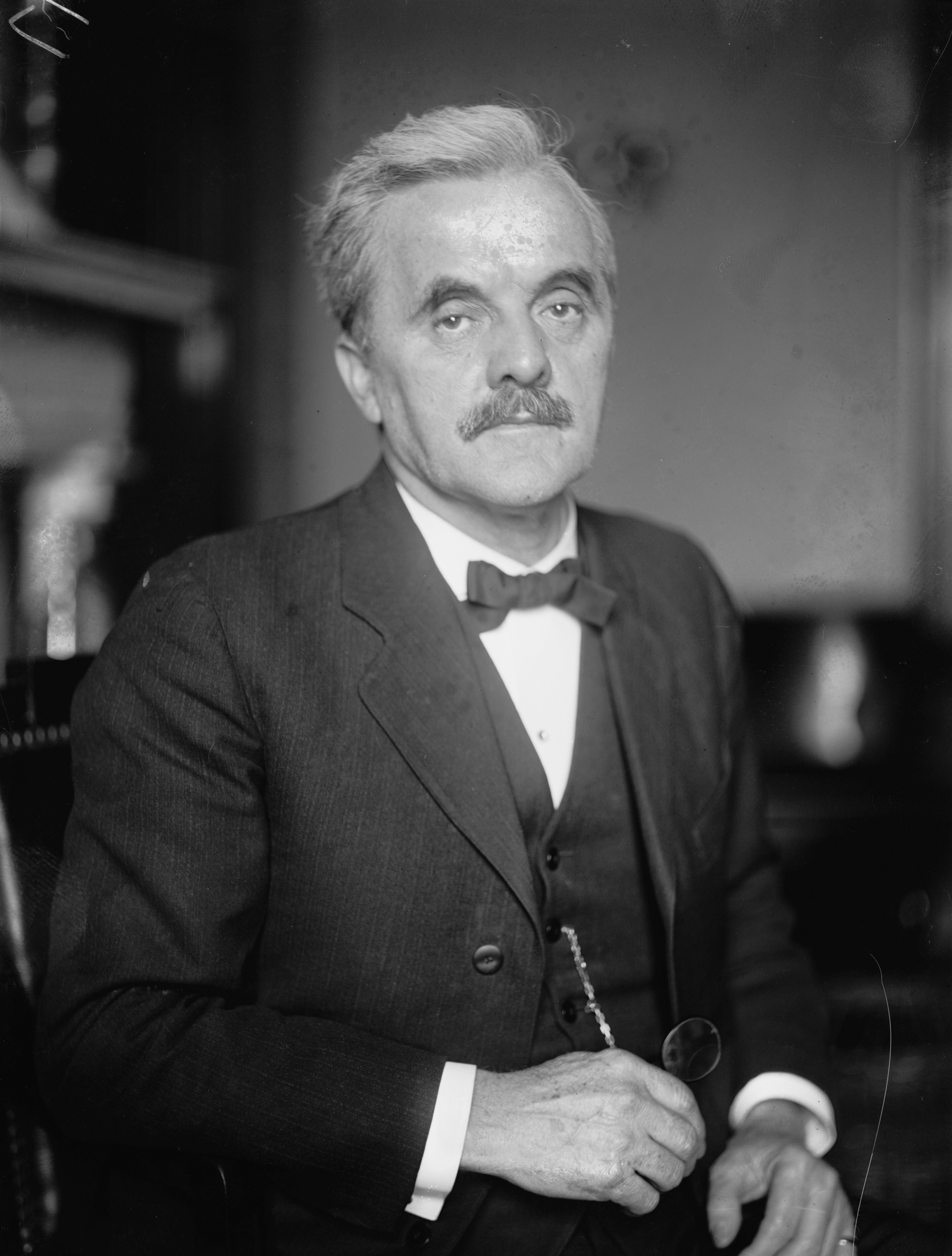
- Senator Norris c. 1918–1921

United States Senator from Nebraska
- In office March 4, 1913 – January 3, 1943
- Preceded by: Norris Brown
- Succeeded by: Kenneth S. Wherry
Senate positions
Chairman of the Senate Judiciary Committee
In office August 1, 1926 – March 3, 1933
Preceded by	Albert B. Cummins
Succeeded by	Henry F. Ashurst
Chairman of the Senate Agriculture Committee
In office March 4, 1921 – August 1, 1926
Preceded by	Asle J. Gronna
Succeeded by	Charles McNary

Member of the U.S. House of Representatives from Nebraska's 5th district
- In office March 4, 1903 – March 3, 1913
- Preceded by: Ashton C. Shallenberger
- Succeeded by: Silas Reynolds Barton

Personal details
- Born: George William Norris; July 11, 1861 York Township, Sandusky County, Ohio, U.S.
- Died: September 2, 1944 (aged 83) McCook, Nebraska, U.S.
- Party: Republican (until 1936); Independent (1936–1944)
- Spouses: Pluma Lashley (m. 1889; died 1901) Ellie Leonard (m. 1903)
- Children: 3
- Education: Baldwin University; Northern Indiana Law School
- Profession: Lawyer

George William Norris (July 11, 1861 – September 2, 1944) was an American progressive politician from Nebraska. He served in the United States House of Representatives as a Republican from 1903 to 1913, and in the United States Senate from 1913 to 1943. Disillusioned with the Republican Party, he became an independent in 1936. In the Senate, Norris was the chairman of the powerful Judiciary Committee and the Agriculture and Forestry Committee.

George W. Norris was a leader of progressive and liberal causes in Congress. He is best known as the man behind the creation of the Tennessee Valley Authority in 1933. Still in operation today, the Tennessee Valley Authority brought electricity to poor rural areas and constructed dams for flood control in the American Southeast. Norris was also the father of Nebraska's unicameral legislature—the only one-house legislature in the United States—and the author of the Twentieth Amendment. He was one of only six senators to vote against U.S. entry into World War I. Norris was known for his populist and pro-labor ideology, his frequent defiance of the Republican Party, his non-interventionist foreign policy, and his intense crusades against what he characterized as "wrong and evil".

President Franklin D. Roosevelt called him "the very perfect, gentle knight of American progressive ideals", and this has been the theme of all his biographers. He is one of eight senators profiled in President John F. Kennedy's Profiles in Courage. A 1957 advisory panel of 160 scholars recommended Norris as the top choice for the five best senators in U.S. history.

== Early life ==
George William Norris was born in 1861 in York Township, Sandusky County, Ohio. He was the eleventh child of poor, uneducated farmers of Scots-Irish and Pennsylvania Dutch descent. He graduated from Baldwin University and earned his LL.B. degree in 1883 at the Northern Indiana Law School.

He moved west to practice law, settling in Beaver City, Nebraska. In 1889 he married Pluma Lashley; the couple had three daughters (Gertrude, Hazel, and Marian) before her 1901 death. The widower Norris married Ellie Leonard in 1903; they had no children.

== Political career ==
=== House insurgent ===
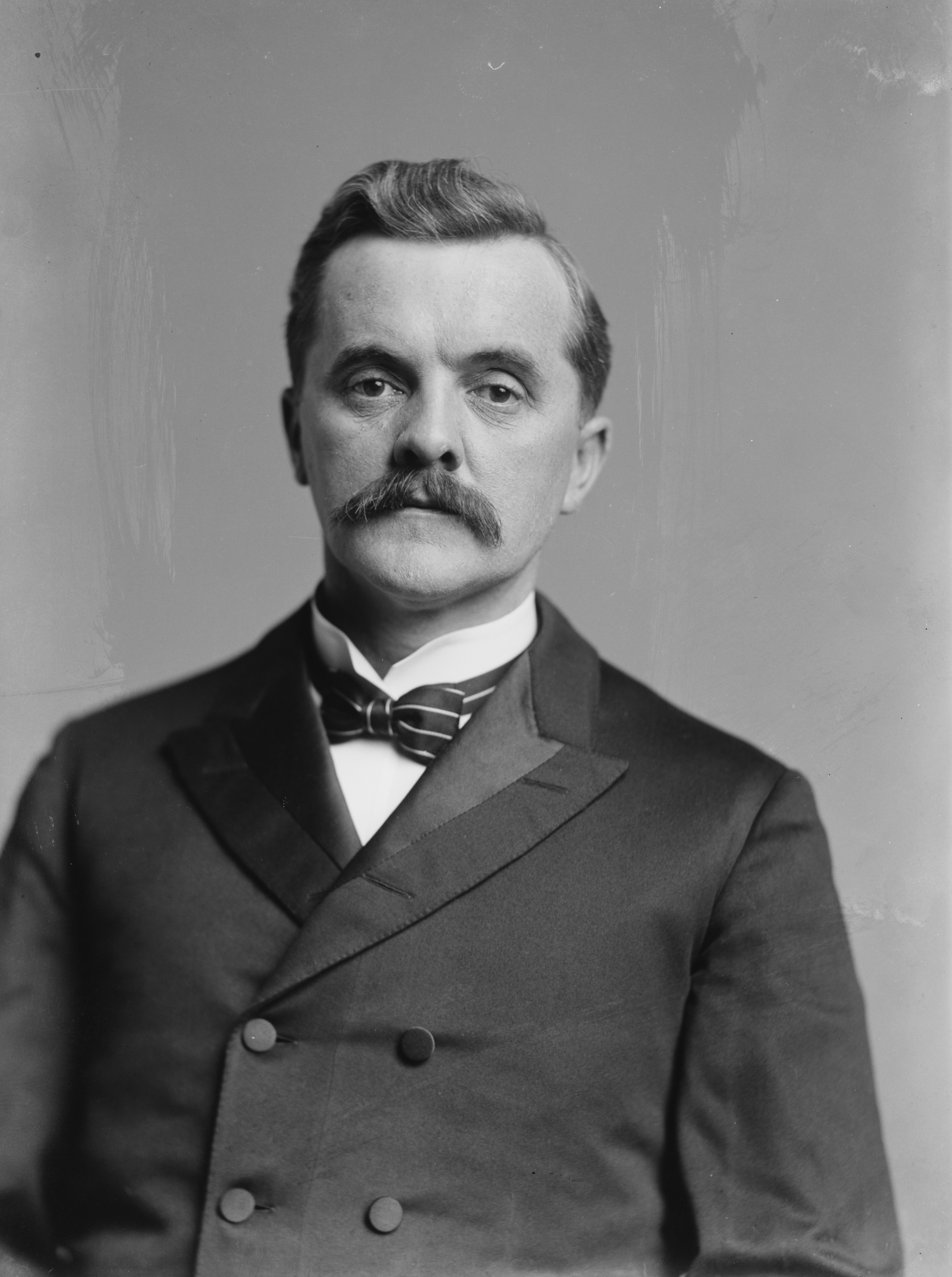
Portrait by C. M. Bell, 1903

In 1900 Norris relocated to the larger town of McCook, where he became active as a Republican in local politics. In 1902, running as a Republican, he was elected to the House of Representatives for Nebraska's 5th congressional district. In that election, he was supported by the railroads; however, in 1906 he broke with them, supporting Theodore Roosevelt's plans to regulate rates for the benefit of shippers, such as the merchants who lived in his district.

Rising to prominence as an insurgent in the House of Representatives, Norris led the 1910 revolt against House Speaker Joseph G. Cannon. At the time, the Speaker's position held enormous unchecked power and he was often called "Czar Cannon." The Speaker was the chairman of the House Rules Committee, which decides which bills will be brought to the House floor for consideration. The Rules Committee then had just five members: the Speaker, two of his majority allies, and two minority members. The three-to-two ratio meant the Speaker almost always got his way.

On March 17, 1910, Norris introduced a resolution to expand the Rules Committee and remove the Speaker as chairman. Norris "sought to create a legislative process independent of any one party leader while empowering different ideological blocs on the committee." The resolution was approved by a vote of 191–156; more than 40 Republicans voted against Cannon. This move successfully ended the Speaker's czarist control over legislation by removing him from the Rules Committee and ensuring the committee was less susceptible to his influence.

In January 1911, Norris helped create the National Progressive Republican League and served as its vice president. He endorsed fellow Progressive Republican Robert M. La Follette, Sr. in the 1912 presidential primaries, even urging former president Theodore Roosevelt to bow out of the Republican primary in support of La Follette. When incumbent president William Howard Taft won the Republican nomination, Roosevelt formed the progressive Bull Moose Party in order to remain in the race (the party disbanded in 1916). Norris supported Roosevelt in the general election.

=== Senator ===
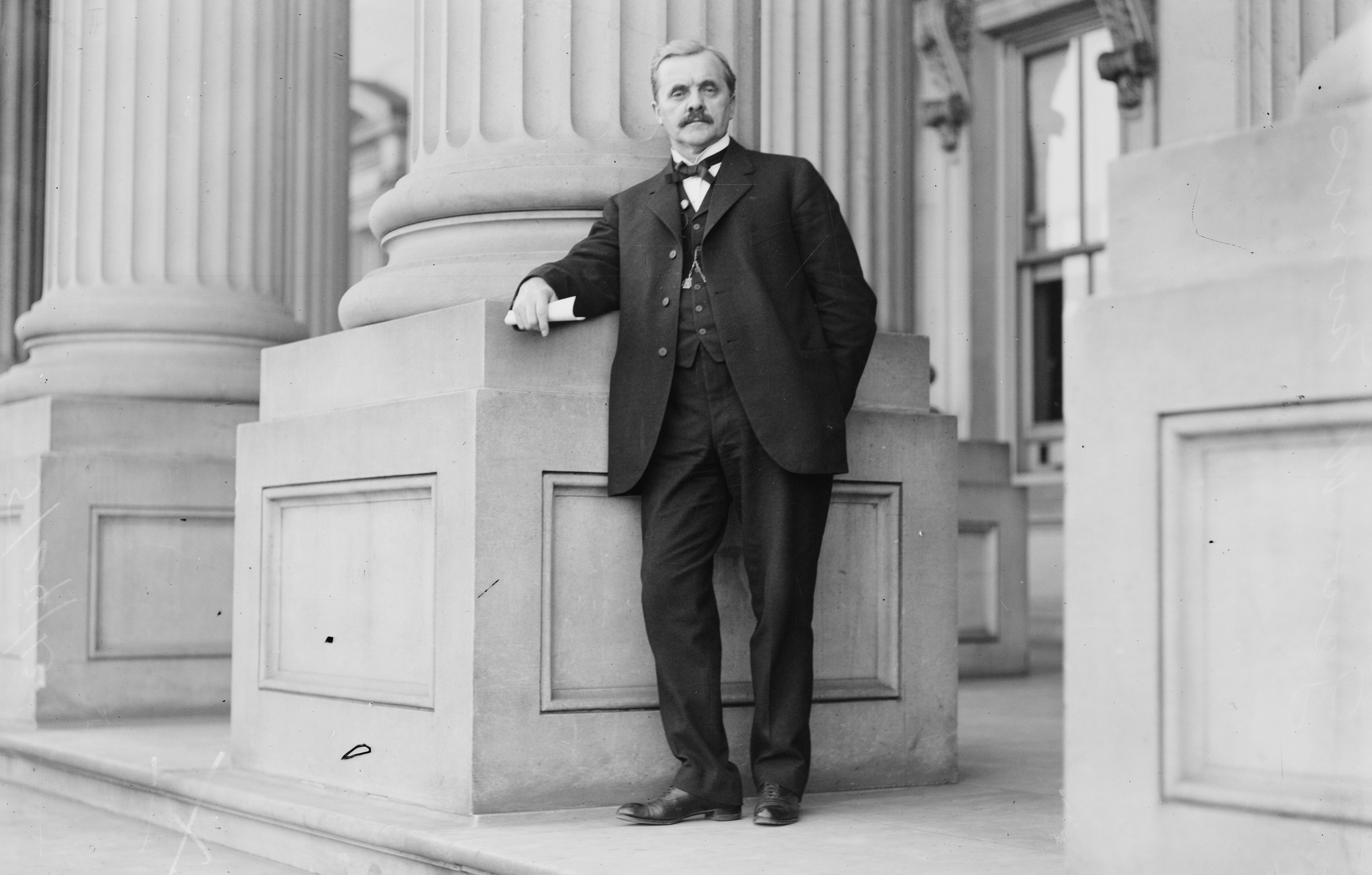
Senator Norris on Capitol Hill, 1913

In 1912, with five House terms under his belt, Norris ran to represent Nebraska in the U.S. Senate. Norris won the election against incumbent Republican senator Norris Brown, and he began his 30-year tenure in the Senate on March 4, 1913.

Notably, Senator Norris was the primary author and sponsor of the Twentieth Amendment to the Constitution, also known as the "Lame Duck" Amendment. The amendment shortened the "lame duck" period between elections and the start of new terms, enhancing government efficiency and creating accountability for elected officials who had been voted out of office.

Norris supported some of President Woodrow Wilson's domestic programs but became a firm isolationist, fearing that bankers were manipulating the country into war. In the face of enormous pressure from the media and the administration, Norris was one of only six senators to vote against the declaration of war on Germany in 1917.

Looking at the war in Europe, he said, "Many instances of cruelty and inhumanity can be found on both sides." Norris believed the government wanted to enter this war only because the wealthy had already aided the British financially in the war. He told Congress the only people who would benefit from the war were "munition manufacturers, stockbrokers, and bond dealers", adding that

"war brings no prosperity to the great mass of common and patriotic citizens. ... War brings prosperity to the stock gambler on Wall Street – to those who are already in possession of more wealth than can be realized or enjoyed."

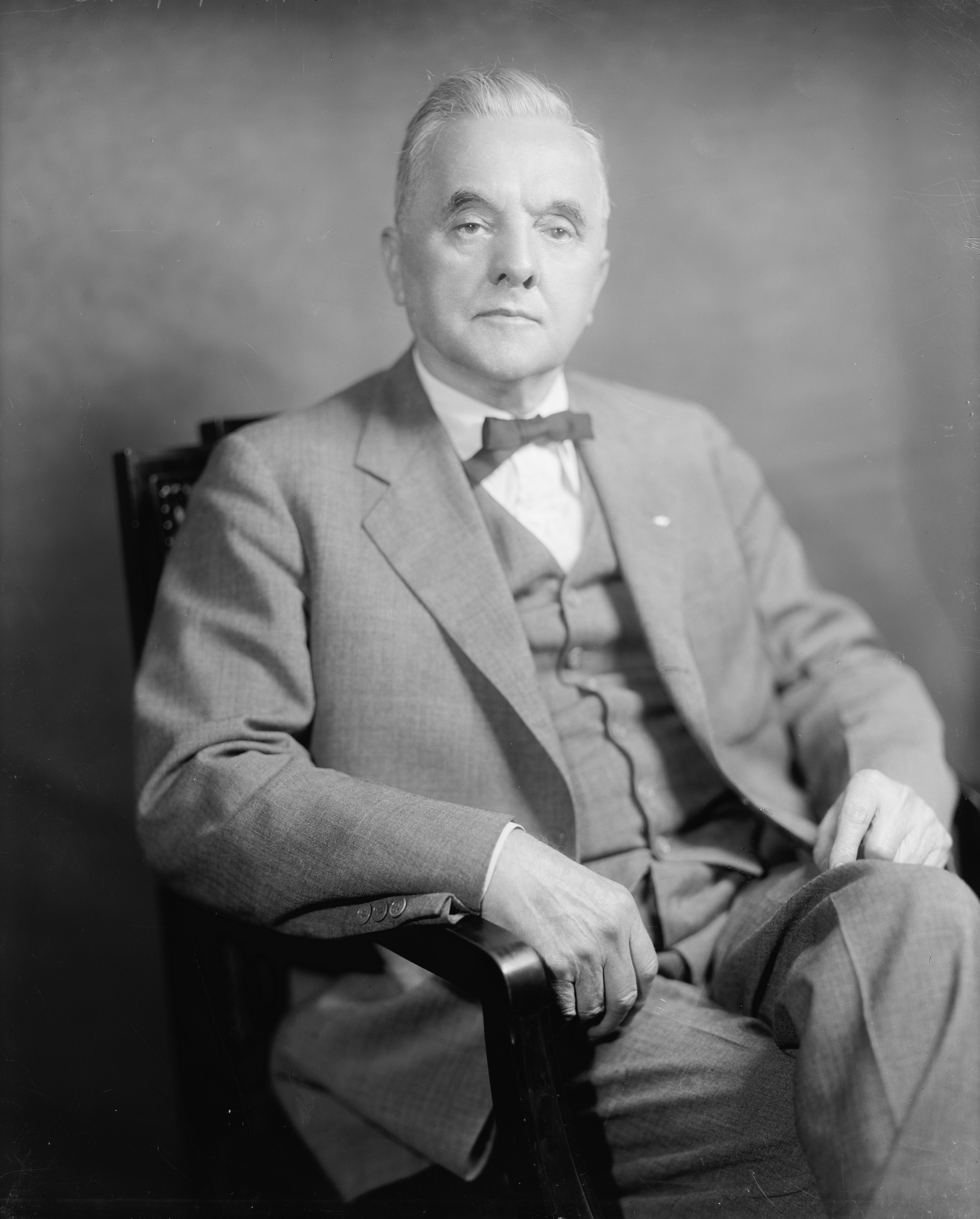
Senator Norris c. 1920s–1930s

Norris joined the Irreconcilables, who opposed and defeated U.S. participation in the Treaty of Versailles and the League of Nations in 1919.

After several terms, Norris's seniority gained him the chairmanships of the Agriculture and Forestry and Judiciary committees. As chairman of the Agriculture Committee, Norris blocked auto tycoon Henry Ford's proposal to buy the unfinished Wilson Dam in Muscle Shoals, Alabama and turn the property and surrounding areas into a modern metropolis. Norris was insistent that the property not be privatized, and instead be developed to provide public electricity and flood control. He twice succeeded in getting Congress to pass legislation for a federal electric power system based at Muscle Shoals, but it was vetoed by presidents Calvin Coolidge and Herbert Hoover. Norris said of Hoover:

"Using his power of veto, he destroyed the Muscle Shoals Bill – a measure designated to utilize the great government property at Muscle Shoals for the cheapening of fertilizer for American agriculture and utilization of the surplus power for the benefit of people.... The power people want no yardstick which would expose their extortionate rates so Hoover killed the bill after it had been passed by both houses of Congress."

Determined to improve quality of life in the rural Tennessee Valley region, Norris built upon the Muscle Shoals Bill to create the Tennessee Valley Authority Act of 1933. The Tennessee Valley Authority (TVA) soon became one of the first (and longest-lasting) programs of FDR's New Deal, and Norris's foremost legacy.

Although a nominal Republican (which was essential to his seniority), Norris routinely attacked and voted against the Republican administrations of Warren G. Harding, Calvin Coolidge, and Herbert Hoover. Norris supported Democrats Al Smith and FDR for president in 1928 and 1932, respectively. As a Progressive Republican, "Regular Republicans" deemed him one of the "Sons of the Wild Jackass".

Norris was a teetotaler, battling against alcohol even when the crusade lost favor during the Great Depression. He told voters prohibition means "this greatest evil of all mankind is driven from the homes of the American people," even if it means "we are giving up some of our personal rights and personal privileges."

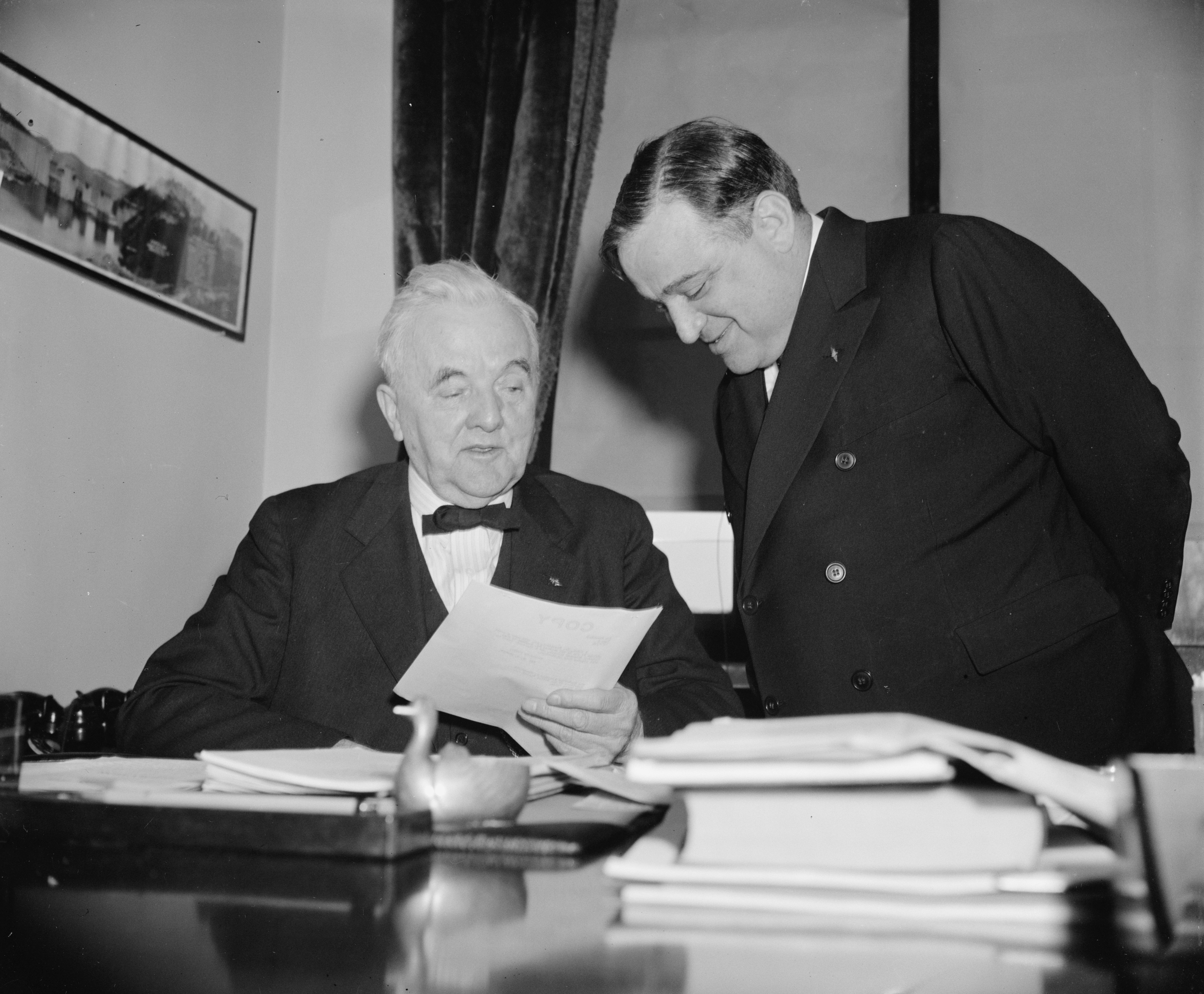
Senator Norris of Nebraska (left) and New York City Mayor Fiorello H. La Guardia in 1938

In 1932, along with Representative Fiorello H. La Guardia (NY-20), Norris secured passage of the Norris–La Guardia Act. It prohibited the practice of employers' requiring prospective employees to commit to not joining a labor union as a condition of employment (the so-called yellow-dog contract) and greatly limited the use of court injunctions against strikes.

In 1935, Norris voted along primarily with Democrats to adjourn the United States Senate as the chamber was deadlocked over the Costigan–Wagner Bill; the anti-lynching bill was ultimately defeated. In spite of inaction on said bill, Norris led efforts to outlaw poll taxes.

Norris is known for leading the conversion of Nebraska's bicameral legislature to the unicameral system. He believed the two-house system was unnecessarily complex, a drain on resources, and vulnerable to corruption and outside interference. Norris's initiative was passed by Nebraska voters in 1934, and the first session of Nebraska's unicameral legislature convened in January 1937. To this day, Nebraska remains the only state with a one-house legislature.

==== Tennessee Valley Authority and later career ====
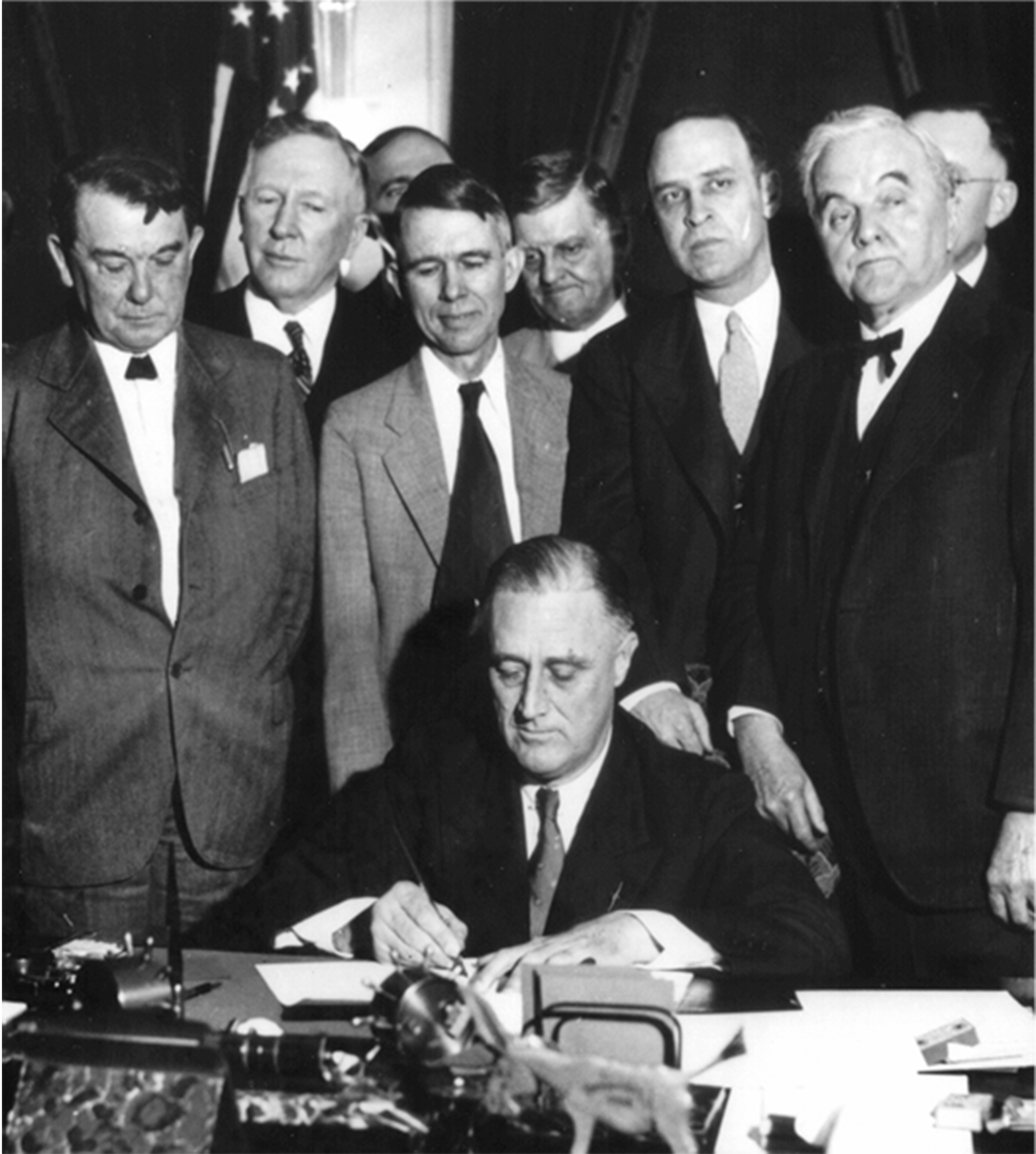
President Franklin D. Roosevelt (center) signs the Tennessee Valley Authority Act into law with Senator Norris (right), 1933

The major achievement of Senator Norris's career was the Tennessee Valley Authority Act of 1933, which he fought for several years to make reality. The Act established the Tennessee Valley Authority (TVA), which brought electricity to widespread parts of the rural South, stimulated the regional economy, and mitigated destructive flooding. Today, TVA is the largest public utility in the U.S., providing electricity to over 10 million Americans. Norris was also the co-author of the sweeping Rural Electrification Act, which expanded upon the benefits of TVA by bringing electrical service to underserved and unserved rural areas across the entire United States.

Norris believed in the wisdom of the common people and in the progress of civilization. "To get good government and to retain it, it is necessary that a liberty-loving, educated, intelligent people should be ever watchful, to carefully guard and protect their rights and liberties," Norris said in a 1934 speech, "The Model Legislature". The people were capable of being the government, he said, affirming his populist/progressive credentials. To alert the people, he called for transparency in government. "Publicity," he proclaimed, "is the greatest cure for evils which may exist in government".

Senator Norris was also an advocate for abolishing the electoral college, which he saw as a barrier to the voice of the American people. Norris initially included a provision to abolish the electoral college within his draft of the Twentieth Amendment, but was warned by his colleagues to strike the provision or they would not support the amendment. Of the electoral college, Norris wrote:

"....[the Electoral College] is unnecessary, cumbersome, and confusing, and has no merit whatever that can be mentioned in its favor, it has a severe and disastrous effect, and....takes away from the voter the right to effectively express his will.... I do not believe that the American people ever will attain their full freedom until they win emancipation from convention manipulation through the privilege of voting directly upon the President and the Vice President of the United States."

In 1936, Senator Norris left the Republican Party and was reelected to the Senate as an independent with 43.8% of the vote. A staunch supporter of the New Deal among other progressive initiatives, the senator believed the Republican Party no longer represented the common American. Norris received a modicum of Democratic support when he departed the Republican Party, but remained an independent and spent the rest of his career as such.

Norris opposed Roosevelt's Judiciary Reorganization Bill of 1937 to pack the Supreme Court, and railed against corrupt patronage.

Senator Norris gradually shifted his stance on isolationism and non-interventionism in the late 1930s as Japan continued to escalate tensions in Asia with aggressive expansionist military action. Siding against Japanese violence in China and Korea, Norris called the Japanese government "disgraceful, ignoble, barbarous, and cruel, even beyond the power of language to describe". He served as vice-president of the League of Friends of Korea, which advocated for Korea's independence.

Unable to secure enough Democratic support in Nebraska, and having been ostracized by much of the Republican Party for his progressive policies, Norris was defeated for re-election in 1942 by Republican Kenneth S. Wherry. He departed from office saying, "I have done my best to repudiate wrong and evil in government affairs."

== Legacy and memorials ==
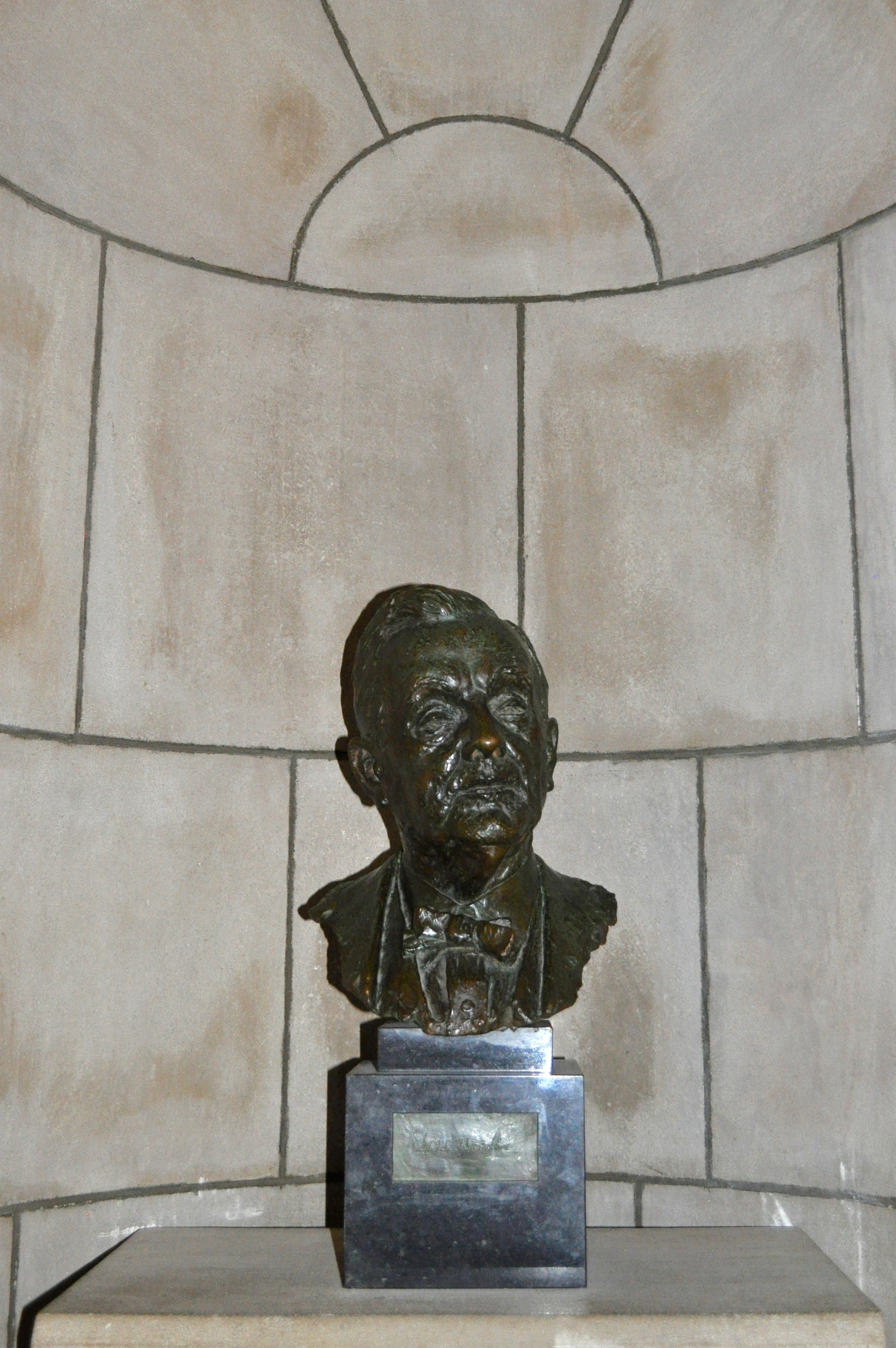
A bust of Norris was created in 1942 by Jo Davidson for the Nebraska Hall of Fame

Norris is one of eight senators profiled in John F. Kennedy's Profiles in Courage, included for opposing Speaker Cannon's autocratic power in the House, for speaking out against arming U.S. merchant ships during the United States' neutral period in World War I, and for supporting the presidential campaign of Democrat Al Smith.

The first dam built under the Tennessee Valley Authority is named Norris Dam and the planned city built alongside the dam is named Norris, Tennessee.

The principal north–south street through downtown McCook, Nebraska is named George Norris Avenue. Norris's house in McCook is listed in the National Register of Historic Places, and is operated as a museum by the Nebraska State Historical Society.

The west legislative chamber of the Nebraska State Capitol, home of the unicameral legislature pioneered by Norris, was named after Norris in February 1984.

George W. Norris Middle School and Norris Elementary School, both in Omaha, Nebraska, as well as Norris School District 160 near Firth, Nebraska, memorialize the late senator. When several public power districts in southeastern Nebraska merged into one in 1941, the new utility was named the Norris Public Power District in Senator Norris's honor. Norris Electric, an energy co-op with headquarters in Newton, Illinois, is named after Norris and his progressive efforts to electrify the nation.

On July 11, 1961, a four-cent stamp was issued in Senator Norris's honor. It depicts, in shades of green, a TVA dam in the upper left, with his portrait to the right. "Gentle knight of progressive ideals", a quote by President FDR on Norris's character, is inscribed at the bottom left, while the words "George W. Norris" appear below his portrait.

In 1961, Norris was inducted into the Nebraska Hall of Fame.

== See also ==
- List of United States senators who switched parties

== Bibliography ==
- Fellman, David. "The Liberalism of Senator Norris", American Political Science Review (1946) 40:27–41 in JSTOR
- Lowitt, Richard
  - George W. Norris: The Making of a Progressive, 1861–1912 (1963)
  - George W. Norris; The Persistence of a Progressive, 1913–1933 (1971)
  - George W. Norris: The Triumph of a Progressive, 1933–1944 (1978)
  - "George W Norris: A Reflective View", Nebraska History 70 (1989): 297–302. online
- Norris, George W. (1945). Fighting Liberal: The Autobiography of George W. Norris. Archived from the original on July 16, 2012 – via Questia.
- Zucker, Norman L. (1966). George W. Norris: Gentle Knight of American Democracy. Archived from the original on July 16, 2012 – via Questia.

Party political offices
First	Republican nominee for U.S. Senator from Nebraska (Class 2); 1913, 1918, 1924, 1930	Succeeded by Robert G. Simmons
U.S. House of Representatives
Preceded by Ashton C. Shallenberger	Member of the U.S. House of Representatives from Nebraska's 5th congressional district 1903–1913	Succeeded by Silas Reynolds Barton
U.S. Senate
Preceded by Norris Brown	U.S. senator (Class 2) from Nebraska; 1913–1943; Served alongside: Gilbert M. Hitchcock, Robert B. Howell, William H. Thompson, Richard C. Hunter, Edward R. Burke, Hugh A. Butler	Succeeded by Kenneth S. Wherry
Political offices
Preceded by Albert B. Cummins	Chairman of the Senate Judiciary Committee; 1926–1933	Succeeded by Henry F. Ashurst
