= Nebraska's 5th congressional district =

Former US electoral district (1890-1940)

- Obsolete district
- Created: 1890
- Eliminated: 1940
- Years active: 1893-1943

Nebraska's 5th congressional district is an obsolete district. It was created after the 1890 United States census and eliminated after the 1940 United States census.

Member	Party	Years of service	Cong ress	Electoral history
District established March 4, 1893
William A. McKeighan (Red Cloud)	Populist	March 4, 1893 – March 3, 1895	53rd	Redistricted from the 2nd district and re-elected in 1892. Lost re-election.
William E. Andrews (Hastings)	Republican	March 4, 1895 – March 3, 1897	54th	Elected in 1894. Lost re-election.
Roderick D. Sutherland (Nelson)	Populist	March 4, 1897 – March 3, 1901	55th 56th	Elected in 1896. Re-elected in 1898. Retired.
Ashton C. Shallenberger (Alma)	Democratic	March 4, 1901 – March 3, 1903	57th	Elected in 1900. Lost re-election.
George W. Norris (McCook)	Republican	March 4, 1903 – March 3, 1913	58th 59th 60th 61st 62nd	Elected in 1902. Re-elected in 1904. Re-elected in 1906. Re-elected in 1908. Re-elected in 1910. Retired to run for U.S. senator.
Silas Reynolds Barton (Grand Island)	Republican	March 4, 1913 – March 3, 1915	63rd	Elected in 1912. Lost re-election.
Ashton C. Shallenberger (Alma)	Democratic	March 4, 1915 – March 3, 1919	64th 65th	Elected in 1914. Re-elected in 1916. Lost re-election.
William E. Andrews (Hastings)	Republican	March 4, 1919 – March 3, 1923	66th 67th	Elected in 1918. Re-elected in 1920. Lost re-election.
Ashton C. Shallenberger (Alma)	Democratic	March 4, 1923 – March 3, 1929	68th 69th 70th	Elected in 1922. Re-elected in 1924. Re-elected in 1926. Lost re-election.
Fred Gustus Johnson (Hastings)	Republican	March 4, 1929 – March 3, 1931	71st	Elected in 1928. Lost re-election.
Ashton C. Shallenberger (Alma)	Democratic	March 4, 1931 – March 3, 1933	72nd	Elected in 1930. Redistricted to the 4th district.
Terry Carpenter (Scottsbluff)	Democratic	March 4, 1933 – January 3, 1935	73rd	Elected in 1932. Retired to run for governor.
Harry B. Coffee (Chadron)	Democratic	January 3, 1935 – January 3, 1943	74th 75th 76th 77th	Elected in 1934. Re-elected in 1936. Re-elected in 1938. Re-elected in 1940. Retired to run for U.S. senator.
District eliminated January 3, 1943
