= List of United States representatives in the 45th Congress =

This is a complete list of United States representatives during the 45th United States Congress listed by seniority.

As a historical article, the districts and party affiliations listed reflect those during the 45th Congress (March 4, 1877 – March 3, 1879). Seats and party affiliations on similar lists for other congresses will be different for certain members.

Seniority depends on the date on which members were sworn into office. Since many members are sworn in on the same day, subsequent ranking is based on previous congressional service of the individual and then by alphabetical order by the last name of the representative.

Committee chairmanship in the House is often associated with seniority. However, party leadership is typically not associated with seniority.

Note: The "*" indicates that the representative/delegate may have served one or more non-consecutive terms while in the House of Representatives of the United States Congress.

== U.S. House seniority list ==
U.S. House seniority
Rank	Representative	Party	District	Seniority date (Previous service, if any)	No.# of term(s)	Notes
1	William D. Kelley	R	PA-04	March 4, 1861	9th term	Dean of the House
2	James A. Garfield	R	OH-19	March 4, 1863	8th term	
3	Samuel J. Randall	D	PA-03	March 4, 1863	8th term	Speaker of the House
4	Fernando Wood	D	NY-09	March 4, 1867; Previous service, 1841–1843 and 1863–1865.	8th term**	
5	Omar D. Conger	R	MI-07	March 4, 1869	5th term	
6	Chester Bidwell Darrall	R	LA-03	March 4, 1869	5th term	Resigned on February 20, 1878.
7	Eugene Hale	R	ME-05	March 4, 1869	5th term	Left the House in 1879.
8	Thomas Swann	KN	MD-04	March 4, 1869	5th term	Left the House in 1879.
9	Horatio C. Burchard	R	IL-05	December 6, 1869	5th term	Left the House in 1879.
10	Joseph Rainey	R	SC-01	December 12, 1870	5th term	Left the House in 1879.
11	John M. Bright	D	TN-05	March 4, 1871	4th term	
12	Mark H. Dunnell	R	MN-01	March 4, 1871	4th term	
13	Benjamin T. Eames	R	RI-01	March 4, 1871	4th term	Left the House in 1879.
14	Charles Foster	R	OH-10	March 4, 1871	4th term	Left the House in 1879.
15	William P. Frye	R	ME-02	March 4, 1871	4th term	
16	John T. Harris	D	VA-07	March 4, 1871; Previous service, 1859–1861.	5th term*	
17	James Monroe	R	OH-18	March 4, 1871	4th term	
18	Alfred Moore Waddell	D	NC-03	March 4, 1871	4th term	Left the House in 1879.
19	Washington C. Whitthorne	D	TN-07	March 4, 1871	4th term	
20	John DeWitt Clinton Atkins	D	TN-08	March 4, 1873; Previous service, 1857–1859.	4th term*	
21	Henry B. Banning	D	OH-02	March 4, 1873	3rd term	Left the House in 1879.
22	Richard P. Bland	D	MO-05	March 4, 1873	3rd term	
23	James Henderson Blount	D	GA-06	March 4, 1873	3rd term	
24	Aylett Hawes Buckner	D	MO-13	March 4, 1873	3rd term	
25	Joseph Gurney Cannon	R	IL-14	March 4, 1873	3rd term	
26	John Bullock Clark, Jr.	D	MO-11	March 4, 1873	3rd term	
27	Hiester Clymer	D	PA-08	March 4, 1873	3rd term	
28	Philip Cook	D	GA-03	March 4, 1873	3rd term	
29	Lorenzo Danford	R	OH-16	March 4, 1873	3rd term	Left the House in 1879.
30	Milton J. Durham	D	KY-08	March 4, 1873	3rd term	Left the House in 1879.
31	John R. Eden	D	IL-15	March 4, 1873; Previous service, 1863–1865.	4th term*	Left the House in 1879.
32	Greenbury L. Fort	R	IL-08	March 4, 1873	3rd term	
33	John Montgomery Glover	D	MO-12	March 4, 1873	3rd term	Left the House in 1879.
34	Benjamin W. Harris	R	MA-02	March 4, 1873	3rd term	
35	Henry R. Harris	D	GA-04	March 4, 1873	3rd term	Left the House in 1879.
36	Robert Anthony Hatcher	D	MO-04	March 4, 1873	3rd term	Left the House in 1879.
37	George Whitman Hendee	R	VT-03	March 4, 1873	3rd term	Left the House in 1879.
38	Jay Abel Hubbell	R	MI-09	March 4, 1873	3rd term	
39	Morton C. Hunter	R	IN-08	March 4, 1873; Previous service, 1867–1869.	4th term*	Left the House in 1879.
40	Eppa Hunton	D	VA-08	March 4, 1873	3rd term	
41	John K. Luttrell	D	CA-03	March 4, 1873	3rd term	Left the House in 1879.
42	Roger Q. Mills	D	TX-04	March 4, 1873	3rd term	
43	William Ralls Morrison	D	IL-17	March 4, 1873; Previous service, 1863–1865.	4th term*	
44	Charles O'Neill	R	PA-02	March 4, 1873; Previous service, 1863–1871.	7th term*	
45	Horace F. Page	R	CA-02	March 4, 1873	3rd term	
46	William A. Phillips	R	KS-01	March 4, 1873	3rd term	Left the House in 1879.
47	William M. Robbins	D	NC-07	March 4, 1873	3rd term	Left the House in 1879.
48	Milton Sayler	D	OH-01	March 4, 1873	3rd term	Left the House in 1879.
49	Abraham Herr Smith	R	PA-09	March 4, 1873	3rd term	
50	Milton I. Southard	D	OH-13	March 4, 1873	3rd term	Left the House in 1879.
51	Horace B. Strait	R	MN-02	March 4, 1873	3rd term	Left the House in 1879.
52	Jacob Montgomery Thornburgh	R	TN-02	March 4, 1873	3rd term	Left the House in 1879.
53	Robert B. Vance	D	NC-08	March 4, 1873	3rd term	
54	Charles G. Williams	R	WI-01	March 4, 1873	3rd term	
55	Samuel S. Cox	D	NY-06	November 4, 1873; Previous service, 1857–1865 and 1869–1873.	9th term**	
56	Alexander H. Stephens	D	GA-08	December 1, 1873; Previous service, 1843–1859.	11th term*	
57	Thomas M. Gunter	D	AR-04	June 16, 1874	3rd term	
58	Simeon B. Chittenden	R	NY-03	November 3, 1874	3rd term	
59	George A. Bagley	R	NY-22	March 4, 1875	2nd term	Left the House in 1879.
60	Latimer Whipple Ballou	R	RI-02	March 4, 1875	2nd term	
61	John Baker	R	IN-13	March 4, 1875	2nd term	
62	William H. Baker	R	NY-24	March 4, 1875	2nd term	Left the House in 1879.
63	Nathaniel P. Banks	R	MA-05	March 4, 1875; Previous service, 1853–1857 and 1865–1873.	9th term**	Left the House in 1879.
64	George M. Beebe	D	NY-14	March 4, 1875	2nd term	Left the House in 1879.
65	Joseph Clay Stiles Blackburn	D	KY-07	March 4, 1875	2nd term	
66	Henry W. Blair	R	NH-03	March 4, 1875	2nd term	Left the House in 1879.
67	Archibald M. Bliss	D	NY-04	March 4, 1875	2nd term	
68	Andrew Boone	D	KY-01	March 4, 1875	2nd term	Left the House in 1879.
69	George Cabell	D	VA-05	March 4, 1875	2nd term	
70	William Parker Caldwell	D	TN-09	March 4, 1875	2nd term	Left the House in 1879.
71	Milton A. Candler	D	GA-05	March 4, 1875	2nd term	Left the House in 1879.
72	Lucien B. Caswell	R	WI-02	March 4, 1875	2nd term	
73	John Blades Clarke	D	KY-10	March 4, 1875	2nd term	Left the House in 1879.
74	Francis Dolan Collins	D	PA-11	March 4, 1875	2nd term	Left the House in 1879.
75	David B. Culberson	D	TX-02	March 4, 1875	2nd term	
76	Augustus W. Cutler	D	NJ-05	March 4, 1875	2nd term	Left the House in 1879.
77	Joseph J. Davis	D	NC-04	March 4, 1875	2nd term	
78	Dudley Chase Denison	R	VT-02	March 4, 1875	2nd term	Left the House in 1879.
79	George Gibbs Dibrell	D	TN-03	March 4, 1875	2nd term	
80	Beverly B. Douglas	D	VA-01	March 4, 1875	2nd term	Died on December 22, 1878.
81	E. John Ellis	D	LA-02	March 4, 1875	2nd term	
82	William Harrell Felton	D	GA-07	March 4, 1875	2nd term	
83	Benjamin J. Franklin	D	MO-08	March 4, 1875	2nd term	Left the House in 1879.
84	James La Fayette Evans	R	IN-11	March 4, 1875	2nd term	Left the House in 1879.
85	William H. Forney	D	AL-07	March 4, 1875	2nd term	
86	Chapman Freeman	R	PA-01	March 4, 1875	2nd term	Left the House in 1879.
87	Benoni S. Fuller	D	IN-01	March 4, 1875	2nd term	Left the House in 1879.
88	Lucien C. Gause	D	AR-01	March 4, 1875	2nd term	Left the House in 1879.
89	Randall L. Gibson	D	LA-01	March 4, 1875	2nd term	
90	John Goode	D	VA-02	March 4, 1875	2nd term	
91	Andrew H. Hamilton	D	IN-12	March 4, 1875	2nd term	Left the House in 1879.
92	Augustus A. Hardenbergh	D	NJ-07	March 4, 1875	2nd term	Left the House in 1879.
93	Carter Harrison, Sr.	D	IL-02	March 4, 1875	2nd term	Left the House in 1879.
94	Julian Hartridge	D	GA-01	March 4, 1875	2nd term	Died on January 8, 1879.
95	William Hartzell	D	IL-18	March 4, 1875	2nd term	Left the House in 1879.
96	Thomas J. Henderson	R	IL-06	March 4, 1875	2nd term	
97	Eli Jones Henkle	D	MD-05	March 4, 1875	2nd term	
98	Abram Hewitt	D	NY-10	March 4, 1875	2nd term	Left the House in 1879.
99	Goldsmith W. Hewitt	D	AL-06	March 4, 1875	2nd term	Left the House in 1879.
100	Charles E. Hooker	D	MS-05	March 4, 1875	2nd term	
101	John Ford House	D	TN-06	March 4, 1875	2nd term	
102	Frank Jones	D	NH-01	March 4, 1875	2nd term	Left the House in 1879.
103	Charles Herbert Joyce	R	VT-01	March 4, 1875	2nd term	
104	J. Proctor Knott	D	KY-04	March 4, 1875; Previous service, 1867–1871.	4th term*	
105	George M. Landers	D	CT-01	March 4, 1875	2nd term	Left the House in 1879.
106	Elbridge G. Lapham	R	NY-27	March 4, 1875	2nd term	
107	George B. Loring	R	MA-06	March 4, 1875	2nd term	
108	William P. Lynde	D	WI-04	March 4, 1875; Previous service, 1848–1849.	3rd term*	Left the House in 1879.
109	Levi A. Mackey	D	PA-20	March 4, 1875	2nd term	Left the House in 1879.
110	Levi Maish	D	PA-19	March 4, 1875	2nd term	Left the House in 1879.
111	John A. McMahon	D	OH-04	March 4, 1875	2nd term	
112	Hernando Money	D	MS-03	March 4, 1875	2nd term	
113	Charles H. Morgan	D	MO-06	March 4, 1875	2nd term	Left the House in 1879.
114	S. Addison Oliver	R	IA-09	March 4, 1875	2nd term	Left the House in 1879.
115	James Phelps	D	CT-02	March 4, 1875	2nd term	
116	David Rea	D	MO-09	March 4, 1875	2nd term	Left the House in 1879.
117	John Henninger Reagan	D	TX-01	March 4, 1875; Previous service, 1857–1861.	4th term*	
118	James Bernard Reilly	D	PA-13	March 4, 1875	2nd term	Left the House in 1879.
119	Americus V. Rice	D	OH-05	March 4, 1875	2nd term	Left the House in 1879.
120	Charles Boyle Roberts	D	MD-02	March 4, 1875	2nd term	Left the House in 1879.
121	Milton S. Robinson	R	IN-06	March 4, 1875	2nd term	Left the House in 1879.
122	Miles Ross	D	NJ-03	March 4, 1875	2nd term	
123	Ezekiel S. Sampson	R	IA-06	March 4, 1875	2nd term	Left the House in 1879.
124	Alfred Moore Scales	D	NC-05	March 4, 1875; Previous service, 1857–1859.	3rd term*	
125	Gustav Schleicher	D	TX-06	March 4, 1875	2nd term	Died on January 10, 1879.
126	Otho R. Singleton	D	MS-04	March 4, 1875; Previous service, 1853–1855 and 1857–1861.	5th term**	
127	Clement Hall Sinnickson	R	NJ-01	March 4, 1875	2nd term	Left the House in 1879.
128	William F. Slemons	D	AR-02	March 4, 1875	2nd term	
129	Robert Smalls	R	SC-05	March 4, 1875	2nd term	
130	William Ephraim Smith	D	GA-02	March 4, 1875	2nd term	
131	William Stenger	D	PA-18	March 4, 1875	2nd term	Left the House in 1879.
132	William A.J. Sparks	D	IL-16	March 4, 1875	2nd term	
133	William McKendree Springer	D	IL-12	March 4, 1875	2nd term	
134	James W. Throckmorton	D	TX-03	March 4, 1875	2nd term	Left the House in 1879.
135	Martin I. Townsend	R	NY-17	March 4, 1875	2nd term	Left the House in 1879.
136	John R. Tucker	D	VA-06	March 4, 1875	2nd term	
137	Jacob Turney	D	PA-21	March 4, 1875	2nd term	Left the House in 1879.
138	Nelson H. Van Vorhes	R	OH-15	March 4, 1875	2nd term	Left the House in 1879.
139	Gilbert Carlton Walker	D	VA-03	March 4, 1875	2nd term	Left the House in 1879.
140	William Walsh	D	MD-06	March 4, 1875	2nd term	Left the House in 1879.
141	Alpheus S. Williams	D	MI-01	March 4, 1875	2nd term	Died on December 21, 1878.
142	Andrew Williams	R	NY-18	March 4, 1875	2nd term	Left the House in 1879.
143	James Williams	D	DE	March 4, 1875	2nd term	Left the House in 1879.
144	Jeremiah N. Williams	D	AL-03	March 4, 1875	2nd term	Left the House in 1879.
145	Benjamin A. Willis	D	NY-11	March 4, 1875	2nd term	Left the House in 1879.
146	Benjamin Wilson	D	WV-01	March 4, 1875	2nd term	
147	Jesse Johnson Yeates	D	NC-01	March 4, 1875	2nd term	Left the House in 1879.
148	H. Casey Young	D	TN-10	March 4, 1875	2nd term	
149	William W. Crapo	R	MA-01	November 2, 1875	2nd term	
150	Haywood Yancey Riddle	D	TN-04	December 14, 1875	2nd term	Left the House in 1879.
151	John T. Wait	R	CT-03	April 12, 1876	2nd term	
152	James B. Belford	R	CO	October 3, 1876	2nd term	Resigned on December 13, 1877.
153	Levi Warner	D	CT-04	December 4, 1876	2nd term	Left the House in 1879.
154	William Aldrich	R	IL-01	March 4, 1877	1st term	
155	D. Wyatt Aiken	D	SC-03	March 4, 1877	1st term	
156	William J. Bacon	R	NY-23	March 4, 1877	1st term	Left the House in 1879.
157	Thomas McKee Bayne	R	PA-23	March 4, 1877	1st term	
158	Charles B. Benedict	D	NY-31	March 4, 1877	1st term	Left the House in 1879.
159	George A. Bicknell	D	IN-03	March 4, 1877	1st term	
160	Horatio Bisbee, Jr.	R	FL-02	March 4, 1877	1st term	Resigned on February 20, 1879.
161	Lorenzo Brentano	R	IL-03	March 4, 1877	1st term	Left the House in 1879.
162	Gabriel Bouck	D	WI-06	March 4, 1877	1st term	
163	Thomas A. Boyd	R	IL-09	March 4, 1877	1st term	
164	Edward S. Bragg	D	WI-05	March 4, 1877	1st term	
165	Mark S. Brewer	R	MI-06	March 4, 1877	1st term	
166	Samuel Augustus Bridges	R	PA-10	March 4, 1877; Previous service, 1848–1849 and 1853–1855.	3rd term**	Left the House in 1879.
167	James Frankland Briggs	R	NH-02	March 4, 1877	1st term	
168	Curtis Hooks Brogden	R	NC-02	March 4, 1877	1st term	Left the House in 1879.
169	Thomas M. Browne	R	IN-05	March 4, 1877	1st term	
170	Solomon Bundy	R	NY-21	March 4, 1877	1st term	Left the House in 1879.
171	Theodore Weld Burdick	R	IA-03	March 4, 1877	1st term	Left the House in 1879.
172	Benjamin F. Butler	R	MA-07	March 4, 1877; Previous service, 1867–1875.	5th term*	Left the House in 1879.
173	John W. Caldwell	D	KY-03	March 4, 1877	1st term	
174	William H. Calkins	R	IN-10	March 4, 1877	1st term	
175	Jacob Miller Campbell	R	PA-17	March 4, 1877	1st term	Left the House in 1879.
176	Richard H. Cain	R	SC-02	March 4, 1877; Previous service, 1873–1875.	2nd term*	Left the House in 1879.
177	John H. Camp	R	NY-26	March 4, 1877	1st term	
178	John G. Carlisle	D	KY-06	March 4, 1877	1st term	
179	James Ronald Chalmers	D	MS-06	March 4, 1877	1st term	
180	William Claflin	R	MA-08	March 4, 1877	1st term	
181	Alvah A. Clark	D	NJ-04	March 4, 1877	1st term	
182	Rush Clark	R	IA-05	March 4, 1877	1st term	
183	Thomas R. Cobb	D	IN-02	March 4, 1877	1st term	
184	Nathan Cole	R	MO-02	March 4, 1877	1st term	Left the House in 1879.
185	James W. Covert	D	NY-01	March 4, 1877	1st term	
186	Jacob Dolson Cox	R	OH-06	March 4, 1877	1st term	Left the House in 1879.
187	Jordan E. Cravens	D	AR-03	March 4, 1877	1st term	
188	Thomas Theodore Crittenden	D	MO-07	March 4, 1877; Previous service, 1873–1875.	2nd term*	Left the House in 1879.
189	Henry J.B. Cummings	R	IA-07	March 4, 1877	1st term	Left the House in 1879.
190	Nathaniel Cobb Deering	R	IA-04	March 4, 1877	1st term	
191	Robert H. M. Davidson	D	FL-01	March 4, 1877	1st term	
192	Horace Davis	R	CA-01	March 4, 1877	1st term	
193	Henry L. Dickey	D	OH-07	March 4, 1877	1st term	
194	Jeremiah W. Dwight	R	NY-28	March 4, 1877	1st term	
195	Anthony Eickhoff	D	NY-07	March 4, 1877	1st term	Left the House in 1879.
196	Joseph Barton Elam	D	LA-04	March 4, 1877	1st term	
197	Charles C. Ellsworth	R	MI-08	March 4, 1877	1st term	Left the House in 1879.
198	Russell Errett	R	PA-22	March 4, 1877	1st term	
199	Isaac Newton Evans	R	PA-07	March 4, 1877	1st term	Left the House in 1879.
200	John H. Evins	D	SC-04	March 4, 1877	1st term	
201	Thomas Ewing, Jr.	D	OH-12	March 4, 1877	1st term	
202	Walbridge A. Field	R	MA-03	March 4, 1877	1st term	Resigned on March 28, 1878.
203	Ebenezer B. Finley	D	OH-14	March 4, 1877	1st term	
204	Mills Gardner	R	OH-03	March 4, 1877	1st term	Left the House in 1879.
205	William Willis Garth	D	AL-08	March 4, 1877	1st term	Left the House in 1879.
206	Dewitt Clinton Giddings	D	TX-05	March 4, 1877; Previous service, 1872–1875.	3rd term*	Left the House in 1879.
207	Alfred C. Harmer	R	PA-05	March 4, 1877; Previous service, 1871–1875.	3rd term*	
208	John Hanna	R	IN-07	March 4, 1877	1st term	Left the House in 1879.
209	Elizur K. Hart	D	NY-30	March 4, 1877	1st term	Left the House in 1879.
210	Dudley C. Haskell	R	KS-02	March 4, 1877	1st term	
211	Philip C. Hayes	R	IL-07	March 4, 1877	1st term	
212	George Cochrane Hazelton	R	WI-03	March 4, 1877	1st term	
213	Daniel Maynadier Henry	D	MD-01	March 4, 1877	1st term	
214	Hilary A. Herbert	D	AL-02	March 4, 1877	1st term	
215	Frank Hiscock	R	NY-25	March 4, 1877	1st term	
216	Herman L. Humphrey	R	WI-07	March 4, 1877	1st term	
217	John N. Hungerford	R	NY-29	March 4, 1877	1st term	Left the House in 1879.
218	Anthony F. Ittner	R	MO-01	March 4, 1877	1st term	Left the House in 1879.
219	Amaziah B. James	R	NY-19	March 4, 1877	1st term	
220	James T. Jones	D	AL-01	March 4, 1877	1st term	Left the House in 1879.
221	John S. Jones	R	OH-09	March 4, 1877	1st term	Left the House in 1879.
222	Joseph Jorgensen	R	VA-04	March 4, 1877	1st term	
223	J. Warren Keifer	R	OH-08	March 4, 1877	1st term	
224	Edwin W. Keightley	R	MI-04	March 4, 1877	1st term	Left the House in 1879.
225	John E. Kenna	D	WV-03	March 4, 1877	1st term	
226	John H. Ketcham	R	NY-13	March 4, 1877; Previous service, 1865–1873.	5th term*	
227	John Weinland Killinger	R	PA-14	March 4, 1877; Previous service, 1859–1863 and 1871–1875.	5th term**	
228	William Kimmel	D	MD-03	March 4, 1877	1st term	
229	Robert M. Knapp	D	IL-11	March 4, 1877; Previous service, 1873–1875.	2nd term*	Left the House in 1879.
230	William Lathrop	R	IL-04	March 4, 1877	1st term	Left the House in 1879.
231	John E. Leonard	R	LA-05	March 4, 1877	1st term	Died on March 15, 1878.
232	Robert F. Ligon	D	AL-05	March 4, 1877	1st term	Left the House in 1879.
233	Stephen Lindsey	R	ME-03	March 4, 1877	1st term	
234	Daniel N. Lockwood	D	NY-32	March 4, 1877	1st term	Left the House in 1879.
235	Van H. Manning	D	MS-02	March 4, 1877	1st term	
236	Benjamin F. Marsh	R	IL-10	March 4, 1877	1st term	
237	Benjamin F. Martin	D	WV-02	March 4, 1877	1st term	
238	Stephen L. Mayham	D	NY-15	March 4, 1877; Previous service, 1869–1871.	2nd term*	Left the House in 1879.
239	Anson G. McCook	R	NY-08	March 4, 1877	1st term	
240	Jonas H. McGowan	R	MI-03	March 4, 1877	1st term	
241	James A. McKenzie	D	KY-02	March 4, 1877	1st term	
242	William McKinley	R	OH-17	March 4, 1877	1st term	
243	Lyne Metcalfe	R	MO-03	March 4, 1877	1st term	Left the House in 1879.
244	John I. Mitchell	R	PA-16	March 4, 1877	1st term	
245	Leopold Morse	D	MA-04	March 4, 1877	1st term	
246	Henry L. Muldrow	D	MS-01	March 4, 1877	1st term	
247	Nicholas Muller	D	NY-05	March 4, 1877	1st term	
248	Henry S. Neal	R	OH-11	March 4, 1877	1st term	
249	Amasa Norcross	R	MA-10	March 4, 1877	1st term	
250	Edward Overton, Jr.	R	PA-15	March 4, 1877	1st term	
251	Romualdo Pacheco	R	CA-04	March 4, 1877	1st term	Resigned on February 7, 1878.
252	George W. Patterson	R	NY-33	March 4, 1877	1st term	Left the House in 1879.
253	Thomas Baldwin Peddie	R	NJ-06	March 4, 1877	1st term	Left the House in 1879.
254	Henry Moses Pollard	R	MO-10	March 4, 1877	1st term	Left the House in 1879.
255	Clarkson Nott Potter	D	NY-12	March 4, 1877; Previous service, 1869–1875.	4th term*	Left the House in 1879.
256	Thaddeus C. Pound	R	WI-08	March 4, 1877	1st term	
257	Llewellyn Powers	R	ME-04	March 4, 1877	1st term	Left the House in 1879.
258	Hiram Price	R	IA-02	March 4, 1877; Previous service, 1863–1869.	4th term*	
259	Auburn Pridemore	D	VA-09	March 4, 1877	1st term	Left the House in 1879.
260	John H. Pugh	R	NJ-02	March 4, 1877	1st term	Left the House in 1879.
261	Terence J. Quinn	D	NY-16	March 4, 1877	1st term	Died on June 18, 1878.
262	James Henry Randolph	R	TN-01	March 4, 1877	1st term	Left the House in 1879.
263	William W. Rice	R	MA-09	March 4, 1877	1st term	
264	Edward White Robertson	D	LA-06	March 4, 1877	1st term	
265	Thomas Ryan	R	KS-03	March 4, 1877	1st term	
266	William Fletcher Sapp	R	IA-08	March 4, 1877	1st term	
267	Leonidas Sexton	R	IN-04	March 4, 1877	1st term	Left the House in 1879.
268	William Shadrack Shallenberger	R	PA-24	March 4, 1877	1st term	
269	Charles M. Shelley	D	AL-04	March 4, 1877	1st term	
270	John H. Starin	R	NY-20	March 4, 1877	1st term	
271	Walter Leak Steele	D	NC-06	March 4, 1877	1st term	
272	Jacob H. Stewart	R	MN-03	March 4, 1877	1st term	Left the House in 1879.
273	John W. Stone	R	MI-05	March 4, 1877	1st term	
274	Joseph C. Stone	R	IA-01	March 4, 1877	1st term	Left the House in 1879.
275	Thomas F. Tipton	R	IL-13	March 4, 1877	1st term	Left the House in 1879.
276	John M. Thompson	R	PA-26	March 4, 1877; Previous service, 1874–1875.	2nd term*	Left the House in 1879.
277	Amos Townsend	R	OH-20	March 4, 1877	1st term	
278	Richard W. Townshend	D	IL-19	March 4, 1877	1st term	
279	Thomas Turner	D	KY-09	March 4, 1877	1st term	
280	William D. Veeder	D	NY-02	March 4, 1877	1st term	Left the House in 1879.
281	Thomas Brackett Reed	R	ME-01	March 4, 1877	1st term	
282	George D. Robinson	R	MA-11	March 4, 1877	1st term	
283	Lewis Findlay Watson	R	PA-27	March 4, 1877	1st term	Left the House in 1879.
284	William Ward	R	PA-06	March 4, 1877	1st term	
285	Frank Welch	R	NE	March 4, 1877	1st term	Died on September 4, 1878.
286	Harry White	R	PA-25	March 4, 1877	1st term	
287	Michael D. White	R	IN-09	March 4, 1877	1st term	Left the House in 1879.
288	Richard Williams	R	OR	March 4, 1877	1st term	Left the House in 1879.
289	Albert S. Willis	D	KY-05	March 4, 1877	1st term	
290	Edwin Willits	R	MI-02	March 4, 1877	1st term	
291	Thomas Wren	R	NV	March 4, 1877	1st term	Left the House in 1879.
292	Hendrick Bradley Wright	D	PA-12	March 4, 1877; Previous service, 1853–1855 and 1861–1863.	3rd term**	
	Hiram Parks Bell	D	GA-09	March 13, 1877; Previous service, 1873–1875.	2nd term*	Left the House in 1879.
	Thomas M. Patterson	D	CO	December 13, 1877; Previous service, 1875–1876.	2nd term*	Left the House in 1879.
	Peter D. Wigginton	D	CA-04	February 7, 1878; Previous service, 1875–1877.	2nd term*	Left the House in 1879.
	Joseph H. Acklen	D	LA-03	February 20, 1878	1st term	
	Benjamin Dean	D	MA-03	March 28, 1878	1st term	Left the House in 1879.
	John Mosher Bailey	R	NY-16	November 5, 1878	1st term	
	Thomas Jefferson Majors	R	NE	November 5, 1878	1st term	Left the House in 1879.
	J. Smith Young	D	LA-05	November 5, 1878	1st term	Left the House in 1879.
	Richard L.T. Beale	D	VA-01	January 23, 1879; Previous service, 1847–1849.	2nd term*	
	William Bennett Fleming	D	GA-01	February 10, 1879	1st term	Left the House in 1879.
	Jesse J. Finley	D	FL-02	February 20, 1879; Previous service, 1876–1877.	2nd term*	Left the House in 1879.

== Delegates ==
Rank	Delegate	Party	District	Seniority date (Previous service, if any)	No.# of term(s)	Notes
1	George Q. Cannon	R	UT	March 4, 1873	3rd term	
2	Martin Maginnis	D	MT	March 4, 1873	3rd term	
3	Orange Jacobs	R	WA	March 4, 1875	2nd term	
4	Jefferson P. Kidder	R	DAK	March 4, 1875	2nd term	
5	Hiram Sanford Stevens	D	AZ	March 4, 1875	2nd term	
6	Stephen Southmyd Fenn	D	ID	June 23, 1876	2nd term	
7	Trinidad Romero	R	NM	March 4, 1877	1st term	
8	William Wellington Corlett	R	WY	March 4, 1877	1st term	

== See also ==
- 45th United States Congress
- List of United States congressional districts
- List of United States senators in the 45th Congress
