= List of United States senators in the 45th Congress =

This is a complete list of United States senators during the 45th United States Congress listed by seniority from March 4, 1877, to March 3, 1879.

Order of service is based on the commencement of the senator's first term. Behind this is former service as a senator (only giving the senator seniority within their new incoming class), service as vice president, a House member, a cabinet secretary, or a governor of a state. The final factor is the population of the senator's state.

Senators who were sworn in during the middle of the Congress (up until the last senator who was not sworn in early after winning the November 1878 election) are listed at the end of the list with no number.

== Terms of service ==
| Class | Terms of service of senators that expired in years |
|---|---|
| Class 3 | Terms of service of senators that expired in 1879 (AL, AR, CA, CO, CT, FL, GA, IA, IL, IN, KS, KY, LA, MD, MO, NC, NH, NV, NY, OH, OR, PA, SC, SD, VT, and WI.) |
| Class 1 | Terms of service of senators that expired in 1881 (CA, CT, DE, FL, IN, MA, MD, ME, MI, MN, MO, MS, NE, NJ, NV, NY, OH, PA, RI, TN, TX, VA, VT, WI, and WV) |
| Class 2 | Terms of service of senators that expired in 1883 (AL, AR, CO, DE, GA, IA, IL, KS, KY, LA, MA, ME, MI, MN, MS, NC, NE, NH, NJ, OR, RI, SC, TN, TX, VA, and WV.) |

== U.S. Senate seniority list ==
U.S. Senate seniority
| Rank | Senator (party-state) | Seniority date | Other factors |
|---|---|---|---|
| 1 | Henry B. Anthony (R-RI) | March 4, 1859 | Former governor |
| 2 | Timothy O. Howe (R-WI) | March 4, 1861 | |
| 3 | John Sherman (R-OH) | March 21, 1861 | |
| 4 | George F. Edmunds (R-VT) | April 3, 1866 | |
| 5 | Roscoe Conkling (R-NY) | March 4, 1867 | |
| 6 | Justin Smith Morrill (R-VT) | March 4, 1867 | |
| 7 | Oliver P. Morton (R-IN) | March 4, 1867 | |
| 8 | Simon Cameron (R-PA) | March 4, 1867 | |
| 9 | George E. Spencer (R-AL) | July 13, 1868 | |
| 10 | Thomas F. Bayard (D-DE) | March 4, 1869 | |
| 11 | Hannibal Hamlin (R-ME) | March 4, 1869 | |
| 12 | Allen G. Thurman (D-OH) | March 4, 1869 | |
| 13 | Eli Saulsbury (D-DE) | March 4, 1871 | |
| 14 | Thomas W. Ferry (R-MI) | March 4, 1871 | |
| 15 | William Windom (R-MN) | March 4, 1871 | Former representative |
| 16 | Henry G. Davis (D-WV) | March 4, 1871 | |
| 17 | John W. Johnston (D-VA) | March 15, 1871 | |
| 18 | Matt W. Ransom (D-NC) | January 30, 1872 | |
| 19 | William B. Allison (R-IA) | March 4, 1873 | Former representative |
| 20 | John P. Jones (R-NV) | March 4, 1873 | |
| 21 | John Brown Gordon (D-GA) | March 4, 1873 | |
| 22 | Stephen Wallace Dorsey (R-AR) | March 4, 1873 | |
| 23 | Aaron A. Sargent (R-CA) | March 4, 1873 | |
| 24 | Simon B. Conover (R-FL) | March 4, 1873 | |
| 25 | Richard J. Oglesby (R-IL) | March 4, 1873 | |
| 26 | John J. Ingalls (R-KS) | March 4, 1873 | |
| 27 | Thomas C. McCreery (D-KY) | March 4, 1873 | |
| 28 | George R. Dennis (D-MD) | March 4, 1873 | |
| 29 | Lewis V. Bogy (D-MO) | March 4, 1873 | |
| 30 | Bainbridge Wadleigh (R-NH) | March 4, 1873 | |
| 31 | Augustus S. Merrimon (D-NC) | March 4, 1873 | |
| 32 | John H. Mitchell (R-OR) | March 4, 1873 | |
| 33 | John J. Patterson (R-SC) | March 4, 1873 | |
| 34 | William W. Eaton (D-CT) | February 5, 1875 | |
| 35 | Francis Cockrell (D-MO) | March 4, 1875 | |
| 36 | Henry L. Dawes (R-MA) | March 4, 1875 | |
| 37 | Charles W. Jones (D-FL) | March 4, 1875 | |
| 38 | Samuel J. R. McMillan (R-MN) | March 4, 1875 | |
| 39 | Samuel B. Maxey (D-TX) | March 4, 1875 | |
| 40 | Ambrose Burnside (R-RI) | March 4, 1875 | Former governor |
| 41 | Newton Booth (AM-CA) | March 4, 1875 | Former governor |
| 42 | Joseph E. McDonald (D-IN) | March 4, 1875 | Former representative |
| 43 | William Pinkney Whyte (D-MD) | March 4, 1875 | |
| 44 | Blanche Bruce (R-MS) | March 4, 1875 | |
| 45 | Algernon Paddock (R-NE) | March 4, 1875 | |
| 46 | Theodore F. Randolph (D-NJ) | March 4, 1875 | Former governor |
| 47 | Francis Kernan (D-NY) | March 4, 1875 | |
| 48 | William A. Wallace (D-PA) | March 4, 1875 | |
| 49 | Robert E. Withers (D-VA) | March 4, 1875 | |
| 50 | Isaac P. Christiancy (R-MI) | March 4, 1875 | |
| 51 | William Sharon (R-NV) | March 4, 1875 | |
| 52 | James B. Eustis (D-LA) | January 12, 1876 | |
| 53 | William H. Barnum (D-CT) | May 18, 1876 | |
| 54 | James G. Blaine (R-ME) | July 10, 1876 | Former representative |
| 55 | Henry M. Teller (R-CO) | November 15, 1876 | |
| 56 | Jerome B. Chaffee (R-CO) | November 15, 1876 | |
| 57 | James E. Bailey (D-TN) | January 19, 1877 | |
| 58 | Frank Hereford (D-WV) | January 31, 1877 | |
| 59 | George F. Hoar (R-MA) | March 4, 1877 | Former representative |
| 60 | Isham G. Harris (D-TN) | March 4, 1877 | Former governor |
| 61 | John Tyler Morgan (D-AL) | March 4, 1877 | |
| 62 | John R. McPherson (D-NJ) | March 4, 1877 | |
| 63 | Matthew Butler (D-SC) | March 4, 1877 | |
| 64 | Richard Coke (D-TX) | March 4, 1877 | |
| 65 | Preston B. Plumb (R-KS) | March 4, 1877 | |
| 66 | James B. Beck (D-KY) | March 4, 1877 | |
| 67 | Lucius Q. C. Lamar (D-MS) | March 4, 1877 | |
| 68 | Augustus H. Garland (D-AR) | March 4, 1877 | |
| 69 | Benjamin H. Hill (D-GA) | March 4, 1877 | |
| 70 | David Davis (I-IL) | March 4, 1877 | |
| 71 | Samuel J. Kirkwood (R-IA) | March 4, 1877 | |
| 72 | Alvin Saunders (R-NE) | March 4, 1877 | |
| 73 | Edward H. Rollins (R-NH) | March 4, 1877 | |
| 74 | William P. Kellogg (R-LA) | March 4, 1877 | |
| 75 | La Fayette Grover (D-OR) | March 4, 1877 | Former governor |
| | J. Donald Cameron (R-PA) | March 20, 1877 | |
| | Stanley Matthews (R-OH) | March 21, 1877 | |
| | David H. Armstrong (R-MO) | September 29, 1877 | |
| | Daniel W. Voorhees (D-IN) | November 6, 1877 | |
| | James Shields (R-MO) | January 27, 1879 | |
| | Zachariah Chandler (R-MI) | February 22, 1879 | |

== See also ==
- 45th United States Congress
- List of United States representatives in the 45th Congress
