= John Taffe =

American politician (1827–1884)

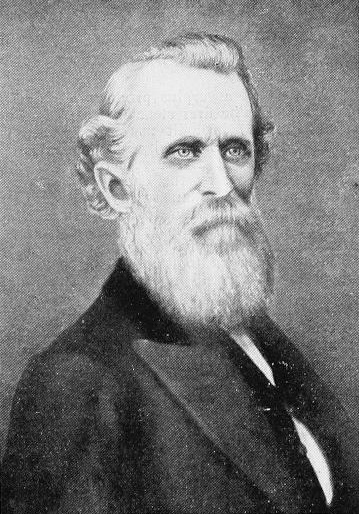

Member of the U.S. House of Representatives from Nebraska's at-large district
- In office March 4, 1867 – March 3, 1873
- Preceded by: Turner M. Marquett
- Succeeded by: Lorenzo Crounse

8th President of the Nebraska Territorial Council
- In office December 2, 1861 – January 10, 1862
- Preceded by: William H. Taylor
- Succeeded by: Edwin A. Allen

Personal details
- Born: January 30, 1827 Indianapolis, Indiana, U.S.
- Died: March 14, 1884 (aged 57) North Platte, Nebraska, U.S.
- Resting place: Prospect Hill Cemetery, North Omaha, Nebraska
- Party: Republican

Military service
- Allegiance: United States
- Rank: Major
- Battles/wars: American Civil War

John Taffe (January 30, 1827 – March 14, 1884) was a Nebraska Republican politician.

== Biography ==
He was born in Indianapolis, Indiana, on January 30, 1827. He passed the bar and moved to the Nebraska Territory in 1856, becoming a member of the Nebraska Territorial House of Representatives from 1858 to 1859 and as the president of the Nebraska Territorial council in 1860 and 1861. During the American Civil War, he enlisted and served as major in the Second Regiment of the Nebraska Volunteer Cavalry. Originally named Captain of Company "I", he was promoted to Major Jan 24, 1863, joining the Field Officers of the entire regiment.

He returned to Omaha, Nebraska, where he was elected to the Fortieth United States Congress from Nebraska. He was re-elected two times serving from March 4, 1867, to March 3, 1873. During the Forty-second United States Congress, he was the chairman on the Committee on Territories.

He resumed his practice of law, becoming receiver of the public land office in North Platte, Nebraska, where he died March 14, 1884. He is buried in Prospect Hill Cemetery in North Omaha.

U.S. House of Representatives
Preceded by Turner M. Marquett (R)	Member of the U.S. House of Representatives from Nebraska's at-large congressional district March 4, 1867 – March 3, 1873	Succeeded by Lorenzo Crounse (R)
