= Turner M. Marquett =

American politician (1831–1894)

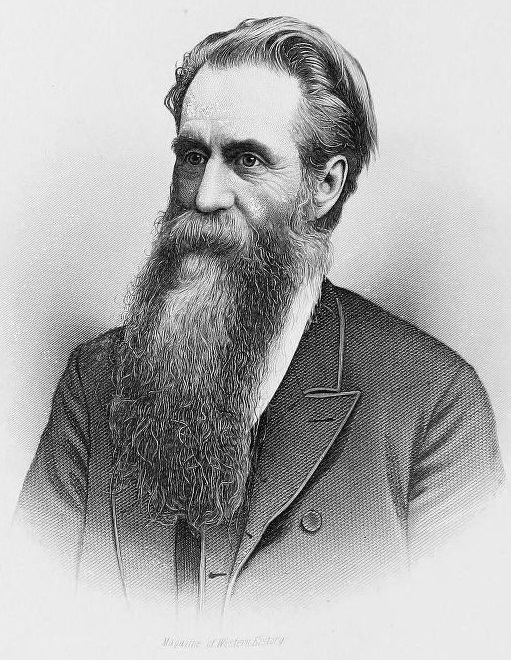

Member of the U.S. House of Representatives from Nebraska's at-large district
- In office March 2, 1867 – March 3, 1867
- Preceded by: district created
- Succeeded by: John Taffe

Personal details
- Born: Turner Mastin Marquett; July 19, 1831 Springfield, Ohio, US
- Died: December 22, 1894 (aged 63) Tampa, Florida, US
- Resting place: Wyuka Cemetery, Lincoln, Nebraska
- Party: Republican

Turner Mastin Marquett (July 19, 1831 – December 22, 1894) was a Nebraska Republican politician best known for being the first House representative for the state.

== Early life ==
Marquett (sometimes spelled "Marquette") was born near Springfield, Ohio, in 1831 and attended Springfield High School and Wittenberg College. He graduated from Ohio University in 1855 and moved to Plattsmouth, Nebraska in 1856. He studied law, was admitted to the bar in 1859, and practiced in Plattsmouth.

== Career ==
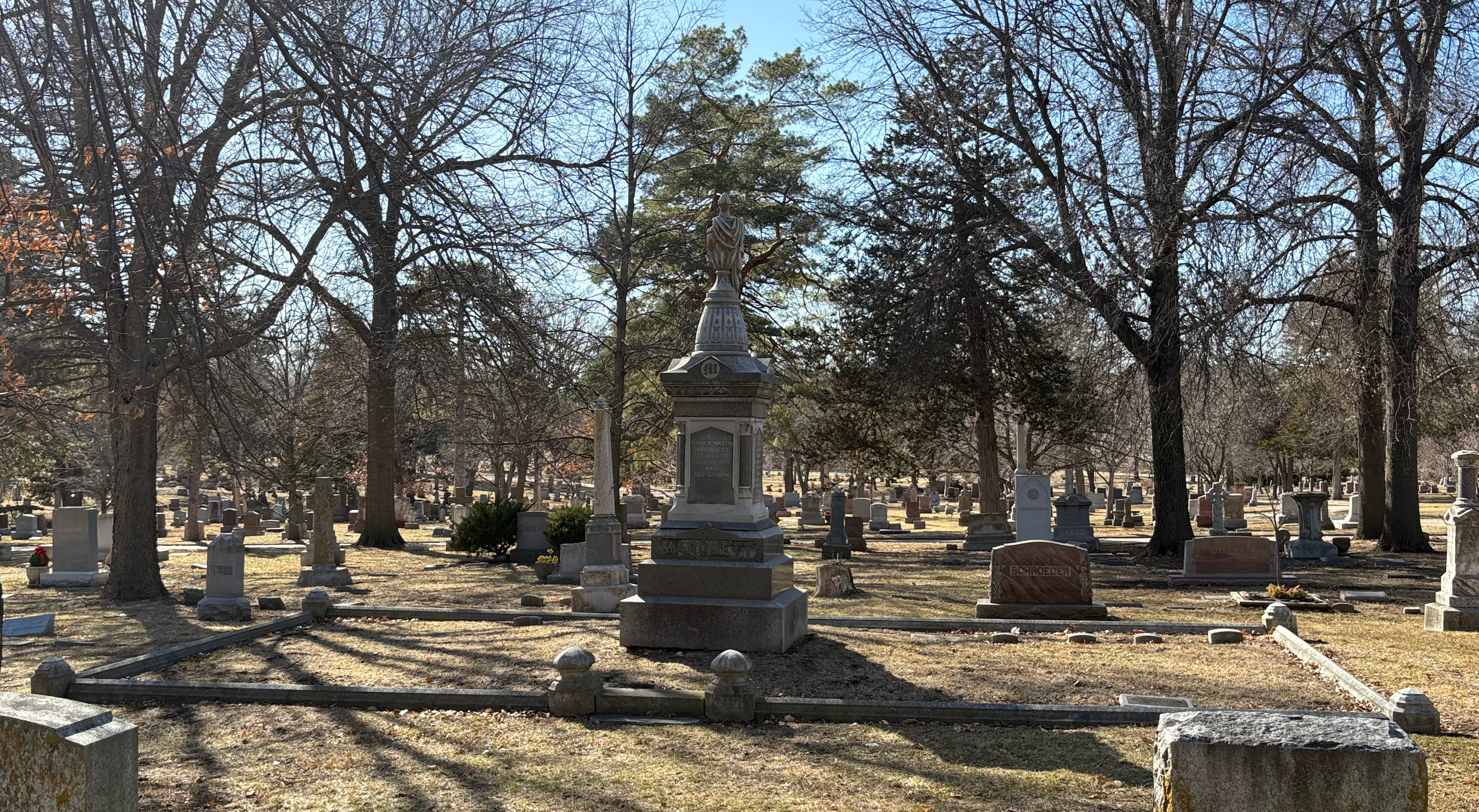
Marquett's grave at Wyuka Cemetery

Marquett was a member of the Nebraska Territorial assembly from 1857 to 1859, and in the Territorial council in 1860 and 1861. He ran and won as Delegate from the Territory of Nebraska to the Fortieth United States Congress, but, since Nebraska was accepted as a state in 1867, the election was voided. He ran for the at-large seat as a U.S. representative for the State of Nebraska, but, because of the exact date of admission, he was only able to serve as a representative for two days.

He resumed his practice in Plattsmouth, moving to Lincoln, Nebraska in 1874. He was general attorney for the Chicago, Burlington & Quincy Railroad from 1869 until December 22, 1894, when he died in Tampa, Florida. He was buried at Wyuka Cemetery in Lincoln.

U.S. House of Representatives
Preceded by Seat created	Member of the U.S. House of Representatives from Nebraska's at-large congressional district March 2, 1867 – March 3, 1867	Succeeded by John Taffe
