= Lorenzo Crounse =

American politician and judge (1834–1909)

8th Governor of Nebraska
- In office January 13, 1893 – January 3, 1895
- Lieutenant: Thomas J. Majors
- Preceded by: James E. Boyd
- Succeeded by: Silas A. Holcomb

Member of the U.S. House of Representatives from Nebraska's at-large congressional district
- In office March 4, 1873 – March 3, 1877
- Preceded by: John Taffe
- Succeeded by: Frank Welch

Member of the Nebraska Territorial House of Representatives
- In office 1866

Associate Justice of the Nebraska Supreme Court
- In office 1867–1873

Assistant Secretary of the U.S. Treasury
- In office April 27, 1891 – October 31, 1892

Member of the Nebraska State Senate from the 10th District
- In office 1901

Personal details
- Born: January 27, 1834 Sharon, New York, U.S.
- Died: May 13, 1909 (aged 75) Omaha, Nebraska, U.S.
- Party: Republican
- Spouse: Mary E. Griffiths

Lorenzo Crounse (January 27, 1834 – May 13, 1909) was a Nebraska Republican politician and the eighth governor of Nebraska.

== Early life ==
Born in Sharon in Schoharie County, New York, Crounse attended the New York Conference Seminary in Charlotteville, New York. While teaching school, he studied law and in 1857 he was admitted to the bar. In 1860, he married Mary E. Griffiths and they had four children.

== Career ==
Crounse established a law practice at Fort Plain, New York. During the Civil War he organized Battery K, New York Light Artillery and became a captain in 1861, served for a year; but was discharged after suffering wounds at a battle on the Rappahannock River in Virginia and resumed his law practice.

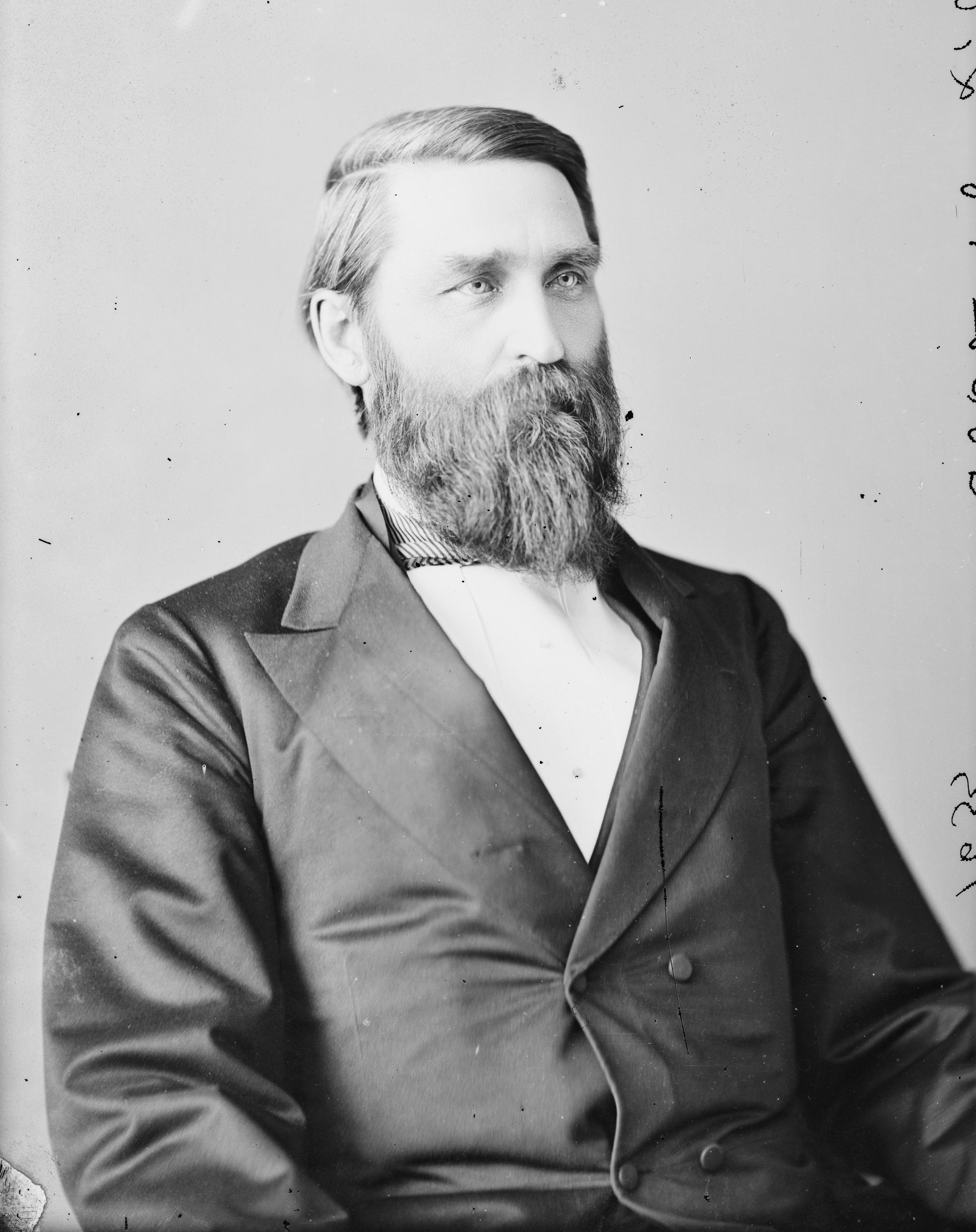
Lorenzo Crounse

Crounse moved to the Nebraska Territory in 1864, and became part of the territorial legislature and later was a delegate to the state's constitutional convention. He became a Justice of Nebraska state supreme court from 1867 to 1873, and after his term expired, ran and was elected as a Republican to the Forty-third and Forty-fourth Congresses (1873–1877). He declined to run again in 1876.

He became an internal revenue collector for the district of Nebraska in 1879, and then was appointed Assistant Secretary of the United States Treasury on April 27, 1891. He resigned on October 31, 1892 to become the 8th governor of Nebraska. During his term, future Nebraska representative William E. Andrews worked as his private secretary. He served until 1895, and then served briefly in the Nebraska state senate in 1901.

== Death and legacy ==
After his wife, Mary E. Griffiths Crounse (1836-1882) died, Crounse remained a widower, and he spent his last years with one of his four children. He died in Omaha. The now-extinct village of Crounse, Nebraska, near Lincoln was named after him.

Party political offices
Preceded by Lucius D. Richards	Republican nominee for Governor of Nebraska; 1892	Succeeded by Thomas Jefferson Majors
U.S. House of Representatives
Preceded by John Taffe	Member of the U.S. House of Representatives from Nebraska's at-large congressional district 1873–1877	Succeeded by Frank Welch
Political offices
Preceded by James E. Boyd	Governor of Nebraska; 1893–1895	Succeeded by Silas A. Holcomb
