= Libertyville, Iowa =

- City
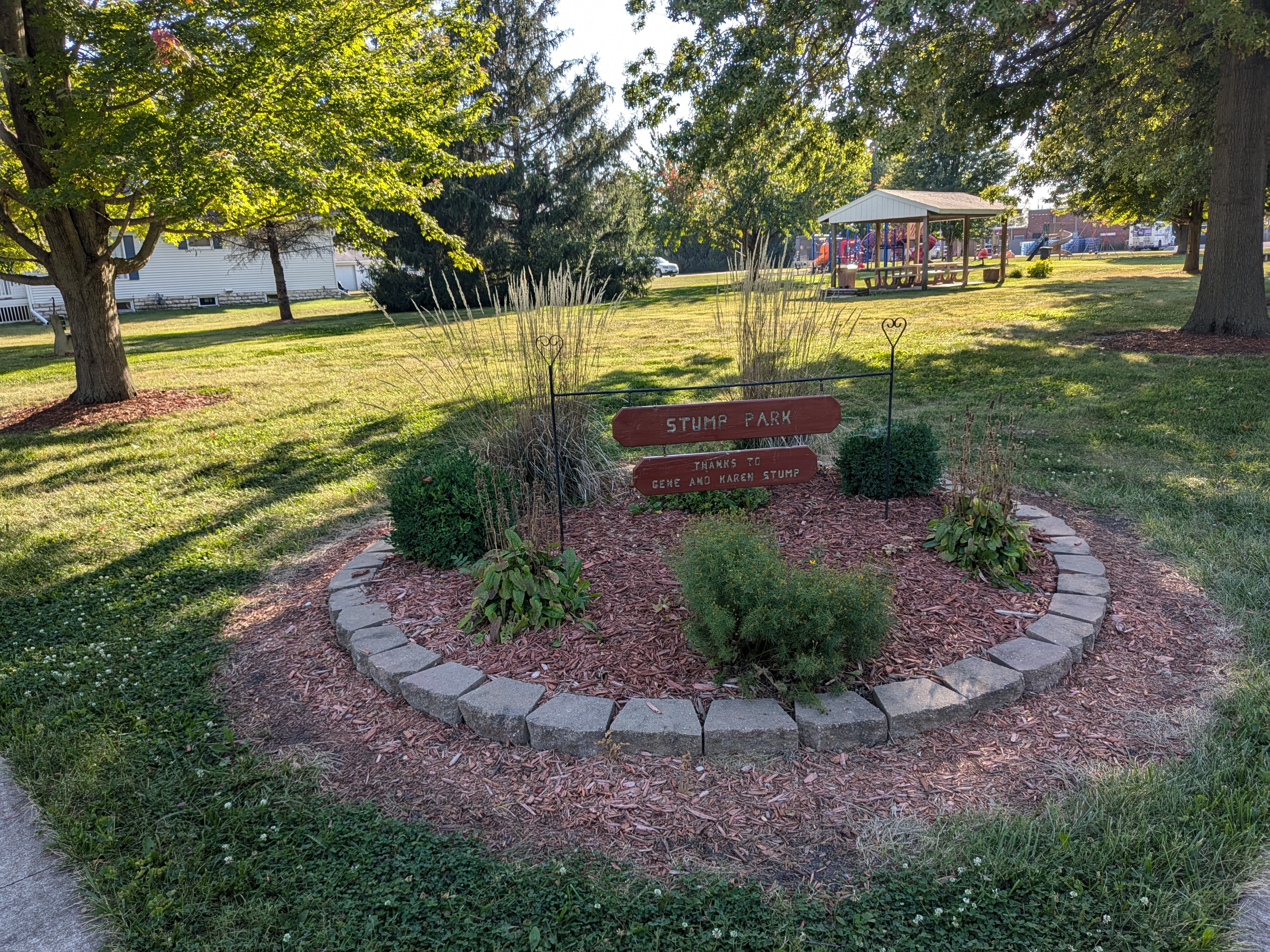
- Stump Park in Libertyville

- Location of Libertyville, Iowa
- Coordinates: 40°57′30″N 92°02′59″W
- Country: United States
- State: Iowa
- County: Jefferson

Area
  - Total: 0.51 sq mi (1.31 km^{2})
  - Land: 0.51 sq mi (1.31 km^{2})
  - Water: 0 sq mi (0.00 km^{2})
- Elevation: 761 ft (232 m)

Population (2020)
  - Total: 274
  - Density: 541.4/sq mi (209.05/km^{2})
- Time zone: UTC-6 (Central (CST))
  - Summer (DST): UTC-5 (CDT)
- ZIP code: 52567
- Area code: 641
- FIPS code: 19-44985
- GNIS feature ID: 2395702
- Website: www.libertyvilleiowa.org

Libertyville is a city in Jefferson County, Iowa, United States. The population was 274 at the time of the 2020 census. It was platted in 1845.

== Geography ==
According to the United States Census Bureau, the city has a total area of 0.49 square miles (1.27 km^{2}), all land.

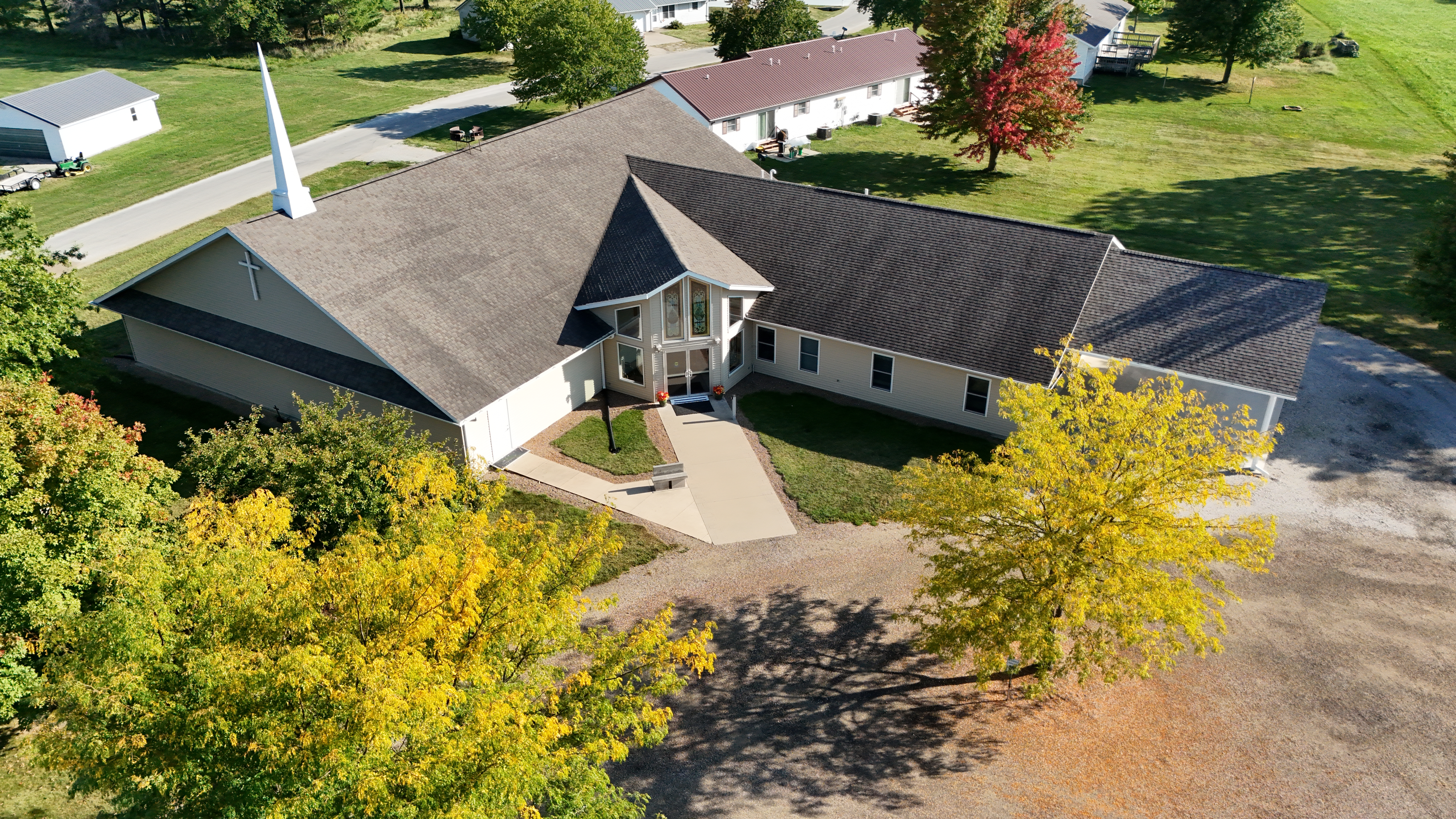
Faith Global Methodist Church in Libertyville

== Demographics ==
Historical populations
Year	Pop.	±%
1880	296	—
1920	321	+8.4%
1930	258	−19.6%
1940	310	+20.2%
1950	311	+0.3%
1960	368	+18.3%
1970	329	−10.6%
1980	281	−14.6%
1990	264	−6.0%
2000	325	+23.1%
2010	315	−3.1%
2020	274	−13.0%
Source:"U.S. Census website". United States Census Bureau. and Iowa Data Center; Source: U.S. Decennial Census

=== 2020 census ===
As of the census of 2020, there were 274 people, 111 households, and 74 families residing in the city. The population density was 541.4 inhabitants per square mile (209.1/km^{2}). There were 133 housing units at an average density of 262.8 per square mile (101.5/km^{2}). The racial makeup of the city was 94.2% White, 0.4% Black or African American, 0.0% Native American, 0.0% Asian, 0.0% Pacific Islander, 0.7% from other races and 4.7% from two or more races. Hispanic or Latino persons of any race comprised 3.3% of the population.

Of the 111 households, 35.1% of which had children under the age of 18 living with them, 52.3% were married couples living together, 5.4% were cohabitating couples, 26.1% had a female householder with no spouse or partner present and 16.2% had a male householder with no spouse or partner present. 33.3% of all households were non-families. 27.9% of all households were made up of individuals, 10.8% had someone living alone who was 65 years old or older.

The median age in the city was 41.5 years. 26.6% of the residents were under the age of 20; 4.4% were between the ages of 20 and 24; 21.2% were from 25 and 44; 29.9% were from 45 and 64; and 17.9% were 65 years of age or older. The gender makeup of the city was 48.5% male and 51.5% female.

=== 2010 census ===
As of the census of 2010, there were 315 people, 132 households, and 86 families living in the city. The population density was 642.9 inhabitants per square mile (248.2/km^{2}). There were 142 housing units at an average density of 289.8 per square mile (111.9/km^{2}). The racial makeup of the city was 97.8% White, 0.3% Native American, 1.3% from other races, and 0.6% from two or more races. Hispanic or Latino of any race were 1.3% of the population.

There were 132 households, of which 33.3% had children under the age of 18 living with them, 54.5% were married couples living together, 8.3% had a female householder with no husband present, 2.3% had a male householder with no wife present, and 34.8% were non-families. Of all households 31.8% were made up of individuals, and 12.9% had someone living alone who was 65 years of age or older. The average household size was 2.39 and the average family size was 2.98.

The median age in the city was 38.2 years; 23.8% of residents were under the age of 18; 6.7% were between the ages of 18 and 24; 29.9% were from 25 to 44; 27.6% were from 45 to 64; and 12.1% were 65 years of age or older. The gender makeup of the city was 49.5% male and 50.5% female.

=== 2000 census ===
As of the census of 2000, there were 325 people, 138 households, and 85 families living in the city. The population density was 665.4 inhabitants per square mile (256.9/km^{2}). There were 143 housing units at an average density of 292.8 per square mile (113.1/km^{2}). The racial makeup of the city was 97.54% White, 0.31% African American, 0.31% Native American, 0.31% Asian, and 1.54% from two or more races. Hispanic or Latino of any race were 0.92% of the population.

There were 138 households, out of which 29.7% had children under the age of 18 living with them, 55.1% were married couples living together, 5.1% had a female householder with no husband present, and 37.7% were non-families. Of all households 32.6% were made up of individuals, and 15.2% had someone living alone who was 65 years of age or older. The average household size was 2.36 and the average family size was 3.05.

In the city, the population was spread out, with 26.8% under the age of 18, 6.8% from 18 to 24, 31.7% from 25 to 44, 21.8% from 45 to 64, and 12.9% who were 65 years of age or older. The median age was 37 years. For every 100 females, there were 91.2 males. For every 100 females age 18 and over, there were 84.5 males.

The median income for a household in the city was $31,071, and the median income for a family was $41,875. Males had a median income of $27,250 versus $17,656 for females. The per capita income for the city was $14,368. About 9.8% of families and 12.5% of the population were below the poverty line, including 16.1% of those under age 18 and none of those age 65 or over.

== Notable person ==
- Thomas Jefferson Majors, former U.S. Representative from Nebraska
