= 45th United States Congress =

1877-1879 U.S. Congress

←	44th	46th	→
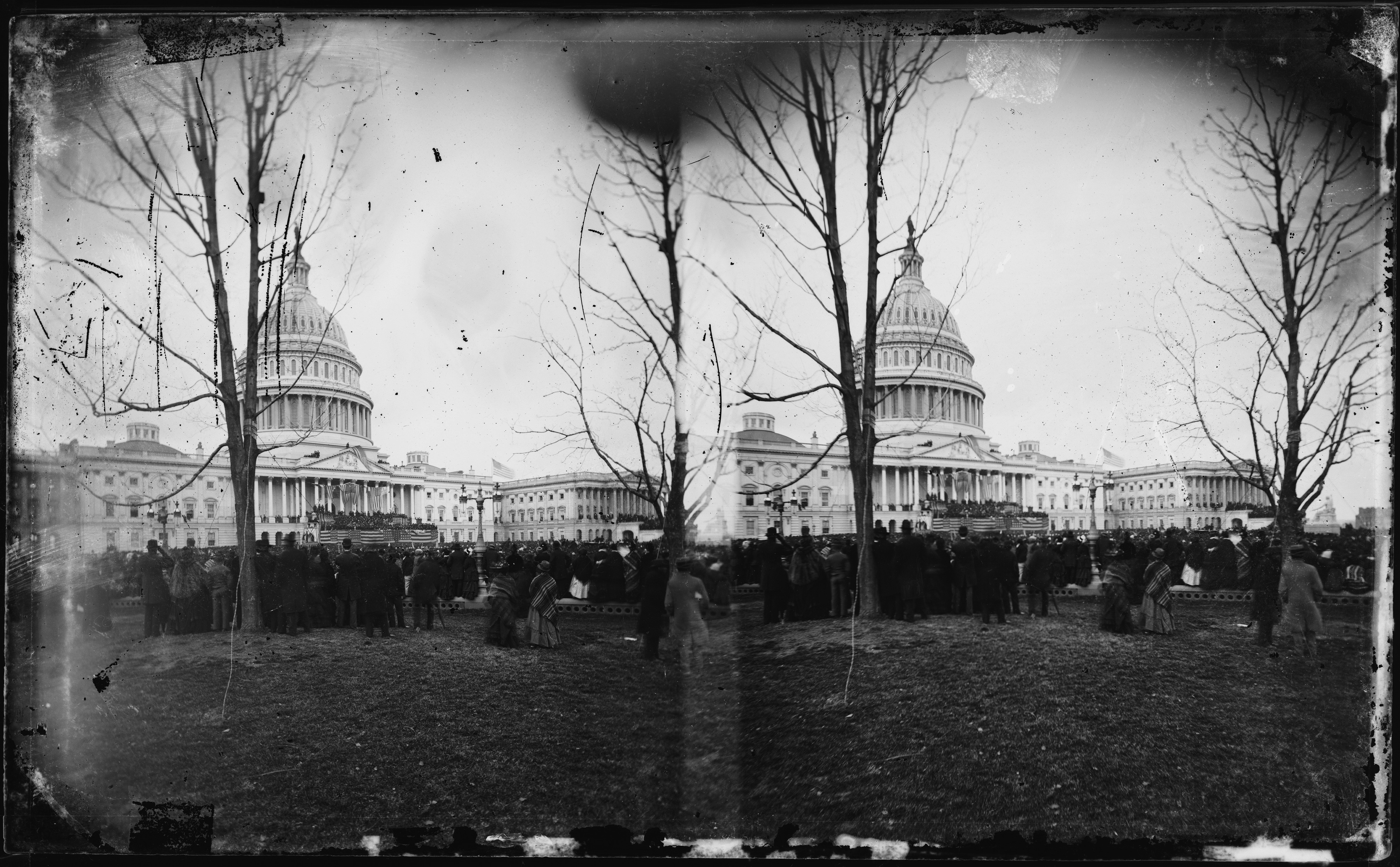
- United States Capitol (1877)

Overview
- Legislative body: United States Congress
- Jurisdiction: United States
- Term: March 4, 1877 – March 4, 1879

Senate
- Members: 76
- President: William A. Wheeler (R)
- President pro tempore: Thomas W. Ferry (R)
- Party control: Republican (with tie-breaking VP)

House of Representatives
- Members: 293 representatives 8 non-voting delegates
- Speaker: Samuel J. Randall (D)
- Party control: Democratic

Sessions
- Special (Note: Special session of the Senate.): March 5, 1877 – March 17, 1877
- 1st: October 15, 1877 – December 3, 1877
- 2nd: December 3, 1877 – June 20, 1878
- 3rd: December 2, 1878 – March 3, 1879

The 45th United States Congress was a meeting of the legislative branch of the United States federal government, consisting of the United States Senate and the United States House of Representatives. It met in Washington, D.C. from March 4, 1877, to March 4, 1879, during the first two years of Rutherford Hayes's presidency. The apportionment of seats in the House of Representatives was based on the 1870 United States census. The Senate had a Republican majority, and the House had a Democratic majority.

The 45th Congress remained politically divided between a Democratic House and Republican Senate. President Hayes vetoed an Army appropriations bill from the House which would have ended Reconstruction and prohibited the use of federal troops to protect polling stations in the former Confederacy. Striking back, Congress overrode another of Hayes's vetoes and enacted the Bland-Allison Act that required the purchase and coining of silver. Congress also approved a generous increase in pension eligibility for Northern Civil War veterans.

== Major events ==
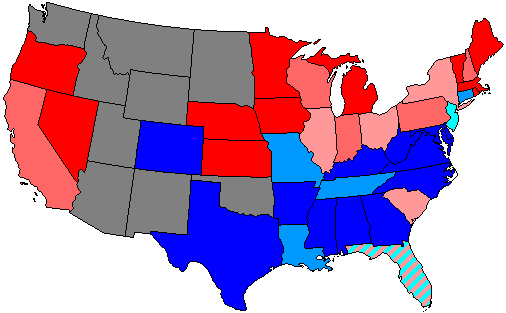
House seats by party holding plurality in state: 80+% Democratic / 80+% Republican; 60+ to 80% Democratic / 60+ to 80% Republican; Up to 60% Democratic / Up to 60% Republican

- March 4, 1877: Rutherford B. Hayes became President of the United States

== Major legislation ==
- February 28, 1878: Bland–Allison Act (Coinage Act (Silver Dollar)), Sess. 2, ch. 20, 20 Stat. 25
- April 29, 1878: National Quarantine Act of 1878, Sess. 2, ch. 66, 20 Stat. 37
- June 3, 1878: Timber and Stone Act, Sess. 2, ch. 151, 20 Stat. 89
- June 18, 1878: Posse Comitatus Act, Sess. 2, ch. 263, §15, 20 Stat. 152

== Party summary ==
The count below identifies party affiliations at the beginning of the first session of this Congress, and includes members from vacancies and newly admitted states, when they were first seated. Changes resulting from subsequent replacements are shown below in the "Changes in membership" section.

During this Congress, two Senate seats and one House seat were added for the new state, Colorado.

=== Senate ===
Republicans controlled the Senate through a VP-tie-breaking majority.

	Party (shading shows control)				Total	Vacant
	Anti- Monopoly (AM)	Democratic (D)	Republican (R)	Independent (I)	Total	Vacant
End of previous congress	1	30	45	0	76	0
Begin	1	35	39	1	76	0
End	1	36	38	1	76	0
Final voting share	1.3%	47.4%	50.0%	1.3%		
Beginning of next congress	1	42	32	1	76	0

=== House of Representatives ===
	Party (shading shows control)						Total	Vacant
	Democratic (D)	Independent Democratic (ID)	Independent	Independent Republican	Republican (R)	Greenback	Total	Vacant
End of previous congress	183	1	3	4	100	0	291	1
Begin	149	2	0	0	141	0	292	1
End	153	2	0	0	136	0	291	2
Final voting share	52.6%	0.7%	0.0%	0.0%	46.7%	0.0%		
Non-voting members	3	0	0	0	5	0	8	0
Beginning of next congress	145	4	1	0	131	11	292	1

== Leadership ==
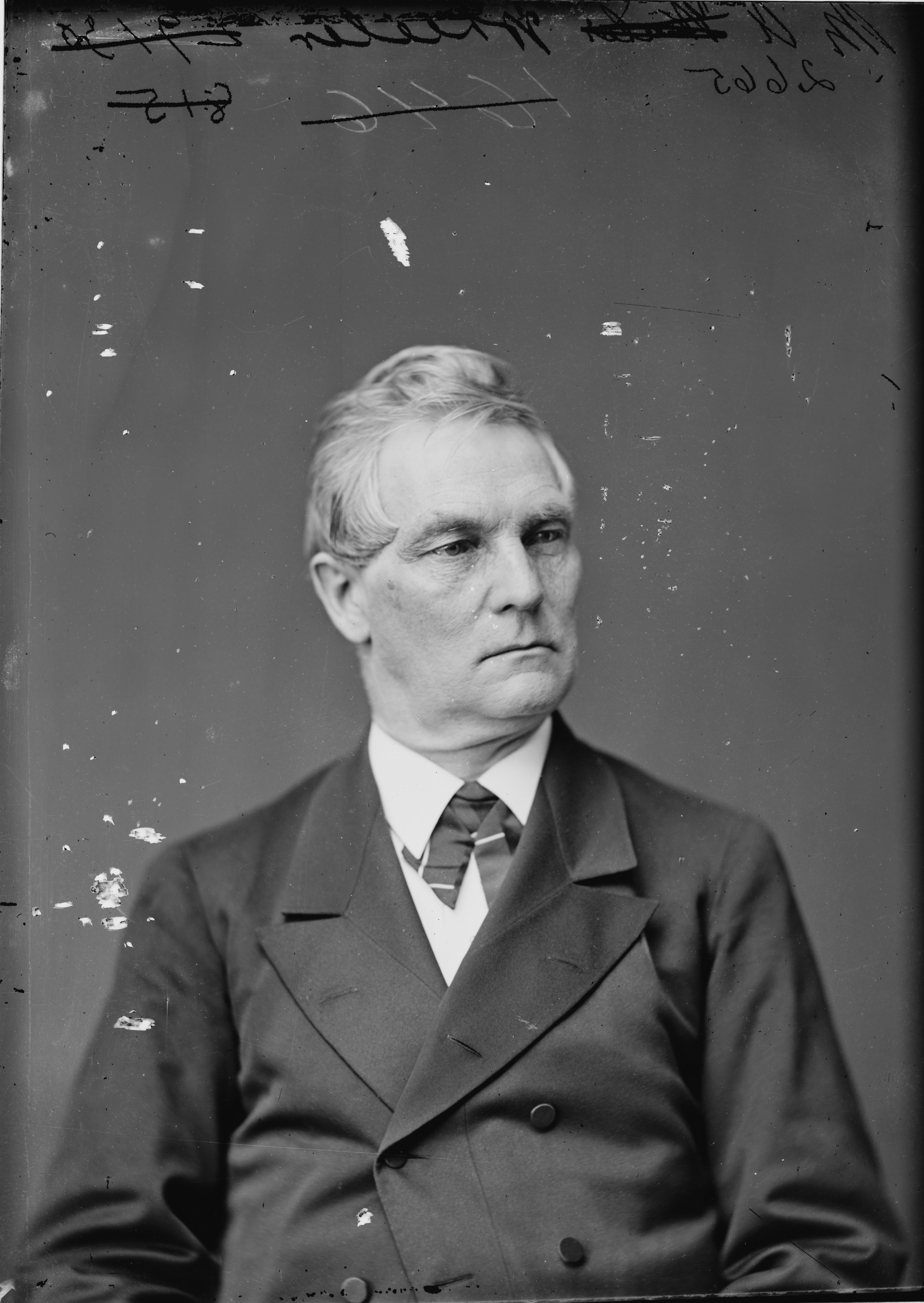
President of the Senate William A. Wheeler

=== Senate ===
- President: William A. Wheeler (R)
- President pro tempore: Thomas W. Ferry (R)
- Republican Conference Chairman: Henry B. Anthony
- Democratic Caucus Chairman: William A. Wallace

=== House of Representatives ===
- Speaker: Samuel J. Randall (D)
- Democratic Caucus Chairman: Hiester Clymer
- Republican Conference Chairman: Eugene Hale
- Democratic Campaign Committee Chairman: Joseph Clay Stiles Blackburn

== Members ==
This list is arranged by chamber, then by state. Senators are listed in order of seniority, and representatives are listed by district.

=== Senate ===
Senators were elected by the state legislatures every two years, with one-third beginning new six-year terms with each Congress. Preceding the names in the list below are Senate class numbers, which indicate the cycle of their election. In this Congress, Class 1 meant their term began in the last Congress, requiring reelection in 1880; Class 2 meant their term began in this Congress, requiring reelection in 1882; and Class 3 meant their term ended in this Congress, requiring reelection in 1878.

Skip to House of Representatives, below

==== Alabama ====
▌2. John T. Morgan (D)
▌3. George E. Spencer (R)

==== Arkansas ====
▌2. Augustus H. Garland (D)
▌3. Stephen W. Dorsey (R)

==== California ====
▌1. Newton Booth (AM)
▌3. Aaron A. Sargent (R)

==== Colorado ====
▌2. Henry M. Teller (R)
▌3. Jerome B. Chaffee (R)

==== Connecticut ====
▌1. William W. Eaton (D)
▌3. William H. Barnum (D)

==== Delaware ====
▌1. Thomas F. Bayard Sr. (D)
▌2. Eli Saulsbury (D)

==== Florida ====
▌1. Charles W. Jones (D)
▌3. Simon B. Conover (R)

==== Georgia ====
▌2. Benjamin H. Hill (D)
▌3. John B. Gordon (D)

==== Illinois ====
▌2. David Davis (I)
▌3. Richard J. Oglesby (R)

==== Indiana ====
▌1. Joseph E. McDonald (D)
▌3. Oliver H. P. T. Morton (R), until November 1, 1877

▌Daniel W. Voorhees (D), from November 6, 1877

==== Iowa ====
▌2. Samuel J. Kirkwood (R)
▌3. William B. Allison (R)

==== Kansas ====
▌2. Preston B. Plumb (R)
▌3. John J. Ingalls (R)

==== Kentucky ====
▌2. James B. Beck (D)
▌3. Thomas C. McCreery (D)

==== Louisiana ====
▌2. William Pitt Kellogg (R)
▌3. James B. Eustis (D)

==== Maine ====
▌1. Hannibal Hamlin (R)
▌2. James G. Blaine (R)

==== Maryland ====
▌1. William Pinkney Whyte (D)
▌3. George R. Dennis (D)

==== Massachusetts ====
▌1. Henry L. Dawes (R)
▌2. George F. Hoar (R)

==== Michigan ====
▌1. Isaac P. Christiancy (R), until February 10, 1879

▌Zachariah Chandler (R), from February 22, 1879

▌2. Thomas W. Ferry (R)

==== Minnesota ====
▌1. Samuel J. R. McMillan (R)
▌2. William Windom (R)

==== Mississippi ====
▌1. Blanche Bruce (R)
▌2. Lucius Q. C. Lamar (D)

==== Missouri ====
▌1. Francis Cockrell (D)
▌3. Lewis V. Bogy (D), until September 20, 1877

▌David H. Armstrong (D), September 29, 1877 - January 26, 1879
▌James Shields (D), from January 27, 1879

==== Nebraska ====
▌1. Algernon Paddock (R)
▌2. Alvin Saunders (R)

==== Nevada ====
▌1. William Sharon (R)
▌3. John P. Jones (R)

==== New Hampshire ====
▌2. Edward H. Rollins (R)
▌3. Bainbridge Wadleigh (R)

==== New Jersey ====
▌1. Theodore F. Randolph (D)
▌2. John R. McPherson (D)

==== New York ====
▌1. Francis Kernan (D)
▌3. Roscoe Conkling (R)

==== North Carolina ====
▌2. Matt W. Ransom (D)
▌3. Augustus S. Merrimon (D)

==== Ohio ====
▌1. Allen G. Thurman (D)
▌3. John Sherman (R), until March 8, 1877

▌Stanley Matthews (R), from March 21, 1877

==== Oregon ====
▌2. La Fayette Grover (D)
▌3. John H. Mitchell (R)

==== Pennsylvania ====
▌1. William A. Wallace (D)
▌3. Simon Cameron (R), until March 12, 1877

▌J. Donald Cameron (R), from March 20, 1877

==== Rhode Island ====
▌1. Ambrose Burnside (R)
▌2. Henry B. Anthony (R)

==== South Carolina ====
▌2. Matthew C. Butler (D)
▌3. John J. Patterson (R)

==== Tennessee ====
▌1. James E. Bailey (D)
▌2. Isham G. Harris (D)

==== Texas ====
▌1. Samuel B. Maxey (D)
▌2. Richard Coke (D)

==== Vermont ====
▌1. George F. Edmunds (R)
▌3. Justin S. Morrill (R)

==== Virginia ====
▌1. Robert E. Withers (D)
▌2. John W. Johnston (D)

==== West Virginia ====
▌1. Frank Hereford (D)
▌2. Henry G. Davis (D)

==== Wisconsin ====
▌1. Angus Cameron (R)
▌3. Timothy O. Howe (R)

Senators' party membership by state at the opening of the 45th Congress in March 1877. The green stripes in California represent Newton Booth of the Anti-Monopoly Party, while the gray stripes in Illinois represent independent David Davis. 2 Democrats 1 Democrat and 1 Republican 2 Republicans Territories

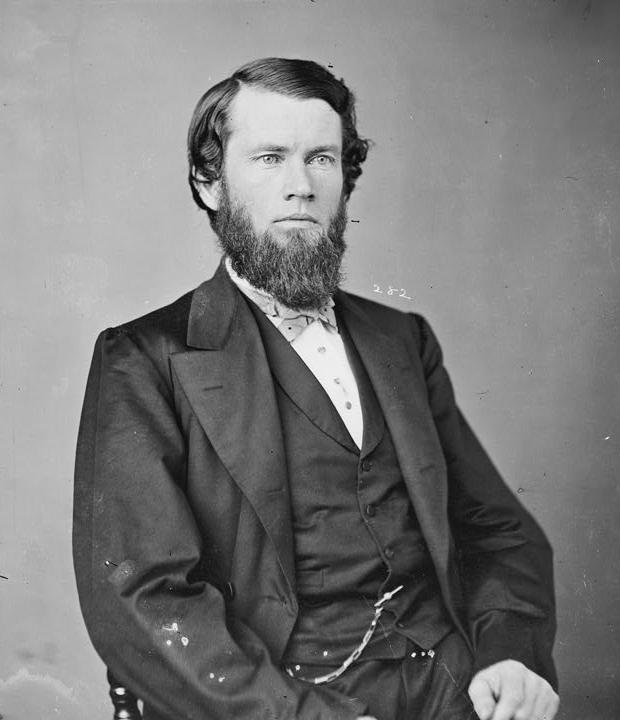
President pro tempore Thomas W. Ferry

=== House of Representatives ===
The names of representatives are preceded by their district numbers.

==== Alabama ====
▌1. James T. Jones (D)
▌2. Hilary A. Herbert (D)
▌3. Jeremiah N. Williams (D)
▌4. Charles M. Shelley (D)
▌5. Robert F. Ligon (D)
▌6. Goldsmith W. Hewitt (D)
▌7. William H. Forney (D)
▌8. William W. Garth (D)

==== Arkansas ====
▌1. Lucien C. Gause (D)
▌2. William F. Slemons (D)
▌3. Jordan E. Cravens (ID)
▌4. Thomas M. Gunter (D)

==== California ====
▌1. Horace Davis (R)
▌2. Horace F. Page (R)
▌3. John K. Luttrell (D)
▌4. Romualdo Pacheco (R), until February 7, 1878

▌Peter D. Wigginton (D), from February 7, 1878

==== Colorado ====
▌At-large. James B. Belford (R), until December 13, 1877

▌Thomas M. Patterson (D), from December 13, 1877

==== Connecticut ====
▌1. George M. Landers (D)
▌2. James Phelps (D)
▌3. John T. Wait (R)
▌4. Levi Warner (D)

==== Delaware ====
▌At-large. James Williams (D)

==== Florida ====
▌1. Robert H. M. Davidson (D)
▌2. Horatio Bisbee Jr. (R), until February 20, 1879

▌Jesse J. Finley (D), from February 20, 1879

==== Georgia ====
▌1. Julian Hartridge (D), until January 8, 1879

▌William B. Fleming (D), from February 10, 1879

▌2. William E. Smith (D)
▌3. Philip Cook (D)
▌4. Henry R. Harris (D)
▌5. Milton A. Candler (D)
▌6. James H. Blount (D)
▌7. William H. Felton (ID)
▌8. Alexander H. Stephens (D)
▌9. Hiram P. Bell (D), from March 13, 1877

==== Illinois ====
▌1. William Aldrich (R)
▌2. Carter H. Harrison (D)
▌3. Lorenzo Brentano (R)
▌4. William Lathrop (R)
▌5. Horatio C. Burchard (R)
▌6. Thomas J. Henderson (R)
▌7. Philip C. Hayes (R)
▌8. Greenbury L. Fort (R)
▌9. Thomas A. Boyd (R)
▌10. Benjamin F. Marsh (R)
▌11. Robert M. Knapp (D)
▌12. William M. Springer (D)
▌13. Thomas F. Tipton (R)
▌14. Joseph G. Cannon (R)
▌15. John R. Eden (D)
▌16. William A. J. Sparks (D)
▌17. William R. Morrison (D)
▌18. William Hartzell (D)
▌19. Richard W. Townshend (D)

==== Indiana ====
▌1. Benoni S. Fuller (D)
▌2. Thomas R. Cobb (D)
▌3. George A. Bicknell (D)
▌4. Leonidas Sexton (R)
▌5. Thomas M. Browne (R)
▌6. Milton S. Robinson (R)
▌7. John Hanna (R)
▌8. Morton C. Hunter (R)
▌9. Michael D. White (R)
▌10. William H. Calkins (R)
▌11. James L. Evans (R)
▌12. Andrew H. Hamilton (D)
▌13. John Baker (R)

==== Iowa ====
▌1. Joseph C. Stone (R)
▌2. Hiram Price (R)
▌3. Theodore W. Burdick (R)
▌4. Nathaniel C. Deering (R)
▌5. Rush Clark (R)
▌6. Ezekiel S. Sampson (R)
▌7. Henry J. B. Cummings (R)
▌8. William F. Sapp (R)
▌9. S. Addison Oliver (R)

==== Kansas ====
▌1. William A. Phillips (R)
▌2. Dudley C. Haskell (R)
▌3. Thomas Ryan (R)

==== Kentucky ====
▌1. Andrew Boone (D)
▌2. James A. McKenzie (D)
▌3. John William Caldwell (D)
▌4. J. Proctor Knott (D)
▌5. Albert S. Willis (D)
▌6. John G. Carlisle (D)
▌7. Joseph C. S. Blackburn (D)
▌8. Milton J. Durham (D)
▌9. Thomas Turner (D)
▌10. John B. Clarke (D)

==== Louisiana ====
▌1. Randall L. Gibson (D)
▌2. E. John Ellis (D)
▌3. Chester B. Darrall (R), until February 20, 1878

▌Joseph H. Acklen (D), from February 20, 1878

▌4. Joseph B. Elam (D)
▌5. John E. Leonard (R), until March 15, 1878

▌John S. Young (D), from November 5, 1878

▌6. Edward W. Robertson (D)

==== Maine ====
▌1. Thomas B. Reed (R)
▌2. William P. Frye (R)
▌3. Stephen D. Lindsey (R)
▌4. Llewellyn Powers (R)
▌5. Eugene Hale (R)

==== Maryland ====
▌1. Daniel M. Henry (D)
▌2. Charles B. Roberts (D)
▌3. William Kimmel (D)
▌4. Thomas Swann (D)
▌5. Eli J. Henkle (D)
▌6. William Walsh (D)

==== Massachusetts ====
▌1. William W. Crapo (R)
▌2. Benjamin W. Harris (R)
▌3. Walbridge A. Field (R), until March 28, 1878

▌Benjamin Dean (D), from March 28, 1878

▌4. Leopold Morse (D)
▌5. Nathaniel P. Banks (R)
▌6. George B. Loring (R)
▌7. Benjamin F. Butler (R)
▌8. William Claflin (R)
▌9. William W. Rice (R)
▌10. Amasa Norcross (R)
▌11. George D. Robinson (R)

==== Michigan ====
▌1. Alpheus S. Williams (D), until December 21, 1878
▌2. Edwin Willits (R)
▌3. Jonas H. McGowan (R)
▌4. Edwin W. Keightley (R)
▌5. John W. Stone (R)
▌6. Mark S. Brewer (R)
▌7. Omar D. Conger (R)
▌8. Charles C. Ellsworth (R)
▌9. Jay A. Hubbell (R)

==== Minnesota ====
▌1. Mark H. Dunnell (R)
▌2. Horace B. Strait (R)
▌3. Jacob H. Stewart (R)

==== Mississippi ====
▌1. Henry L. Muldrow (D)
▌2. Vannoy H. Manning (D)
▌3. Hernando Money (D)
▌4. Otho R. Singleton (D)
▌5. Charles E. Hooker (D)
▌6. James R. Chalmers (D)

==== Missouri ====
▌1. Anthony F. Ittner (R)
▌2. Nathan Cole (R)
▌3. Lyne S. Metcalfe (R)
▌4. Robert A. Hatcher (D)
▌5. Richard P. Bland (D)
▌6. Charles H. Morgan (D)
▌7. Thomas T. Crittenden (D)
▌8. Benjamin J. Franklin (D)
▌9. David Rea (D)
▌10. Henry M. Pollard (R)
▌11. John B. Clark Jr. (D)
▌12. John M. Glover (D)
▌13. Aylett H. Buckner (D)

==== Nebraska ====
▌At-large. Frank Welch (R), until September 4, 1878

▌Thomas J. Majors (R), from November 5, 1878

==== Nevada ====
▌At-large. Thomas Wren (R)

==== New Hampshire ====
▌1. Frank Jones (D)
▌2. James F. Briggs (R)
▌3. Henry W. Blair (R)

==== New Jersey ====
▌1. Clement H. Sinnickson (R)
▌2. John H. Pugh (R)
▌3. Miles Ross (D)
▌4. Alvah A. Clark (D)
▌5. Augustus W. Cutler (D)
▌6. Thomas B. Peddie (R)
▌7. Augustus A. Hardenbergh (D)

==== New York ====
▌1. James W. Covert (D)
▌2. William D. Veeder (D)
▌3. Simeon B. Chittenden (R)
▌4. Archibald M. Bliss (D)
▌5. Nicholas Muller (D)
▌6. Samuel S. Cox (D)
▌7. Anthony Eickhoff (D)
▌8. Anson G. McCook (R)
▌9. Fernando Wood (D)
▌10. Abram S. Hewitt (D)
▌11. Benjamin A. Willis (D)
▌12. Clarkson N. Potter (D)
▌13. John H. Ketcham (R)
▌14. George M. Beebe (D)
▌15. Stephen L. Mayham (D)
▌16. Terence J. Quinn (D), until June 18, 1878

▌John M. Bailey (R), from November 5, 1878

▌17. Martin I. Townsend (R)
▌18. Andrew Williams (R)
▌19. Amaziah B. James (R)
▌20. John H. Starin (R)
▌21. Solomon Bundy (R)
▌22. George A. Bagley (R)
▌23. William J. Bacon (R)
▌24. William H. Baker (R)
▌25. Frank Hiscock (R)
▌26. John H. Camp (R)
▌27. Elbridge G. Lapham (R)
▌28. Jeremiah W. Dwight (R)
▌29. John N. Hungerford (R)
▌30. E. Kirke Hart (D)
▌31. Charles B. Benedict (D)
▌32. Daniel N. Lockwood (D)
▌33. George W. Patterson (R)

==== North Carolina ====
▌1. Jesse J. Yeates (D)
▌2. Curtis H. Brogden (R)
▌3. Alfred M. Waddell (D)
▌4. Joseph J. Davis (D)
▌5. Alfred M. Scales (D)
▌6. Walter L. Steele (D)
▌7. William M. Robbins (D)
▌8. Robert B. Vance (D)

==== Ohio ====
▌1. Milton Sayler (D)
▌2. Henry B. Banning (D)
▌3. Mills Gardner (R)
▌4. John A. McMahon (D)
▌5. Americus V. Rice (D)
▌6. Jacob D. Cox (R)
▌7. Henry L. Dickey (D)
▌8. J. Warren Keifer (R)
▌9. John S. Jones (R)
▌10. Charles Foster (R)
▌11. Henry S. Neal (R)
▌12. Thomas Ewing Jr. (D)
▌13. Milton I. Southard (D)
▌14. Ebenezer B. Finley (D)
▌15. Nelson H. Van Vorhes (R)
▌16. Lorenzo Danford (R)
▌17. William McKinley (R)
▌18. James Monroe (R)
▌19. James A. Garfield (R)
▌20. Amos Townsend (R)

==== Oregon ====
▌At-large. Richard Williams (R)

==== Pennsylvania ====
▌1. Chapman Freeman (R)
▌2. Charles O'Neill (R)
▌3. Samuel J. Randall (D)
▌4. William D. Kelley (R)
▌5. Alfred C. Harmer (R)
▌6. William Ward (R)
▌7. I. Newton Evans (R)
▌8. Hiester Clymer (D)
▌9. A. Herr Smith (R)
▌10. Samuel A. Bridges (D)
▌11. Francis D. Collins (D)
▌12. Hendrick B. Wright (D)
▌13. James B. Reilly (D)
▌14. John W. Killinger (R)
▌15. Edward Overton Jr. (R)
▌16. John I. Mitchell (R)
▌17. Jacob M. Campbell (R)
▌18. William Stenger (D)
▌19. Levi Maish (D)
▌20. Levi A. Mackey (D)
▌21. Jacob Turney (D)
▌22. Russell Errett (R)
▌23. Thomas M. Bayne (R)
▌24. William S. Shallenberger (R)
▌25. Harry White (R)
▌26. John M. Thompson (R)
▌27. Lewis F. Watson (R)

==== Rhode Island ====
▌1. Benjamin T. Eames (R)
▌2. Latimer W. Ballou (R)

==== South Carolina ====
▌1. Joseph Rainey (R)
▌2. Richard H. Cain (R)
▌3. D. Wyatt Aiken (D)
▌4. John H. Evins (D)
▌5. Robert Smalls (R)

==== Tennessee ====
▌1. James H. Randolph (R)
▌2. Jacob M. Thornburgh (R)
▌3. George G. Dibrell (D)
▌4. Haywood Y. Riddle (D)
▌5. John M. Bright (D)
▌6. John F. House (D)
▌7. Washington C. Whitthorne (D)
▌8. John D. C. Atkins (D)
▌9. William P. Caldwell (D)
▌10. H. Casey Young (D)

==== Texas ====
▌1. John H. Reagan (D)
▌2. David B. Culberson (D)
▌3. James W. Throckmorton (D)
▌4. Roger Q. Mills (D)
▌5. Dewitt C. Giddings (D)
▌6. Gustave Schleicher (D), until January 10, 1879

==== Vermont ====
▌1. Charles H. Joyce (R)
▌2. Dudley C. Denison (R)
▌3. George W. Hendee (R)

==== Virginia ====
▌1. Beverly B. Douglas (D), until December 22, 1878

▌Richard Lee T. Beale (D), from January 23, 1879

▌2. John Goode Jr. (D)
▌3. Gilbert C. Walker (D)
▌4. Joseph Jorgensen (R)
▌5. George Cabell (D)
▌6. John R. Tucker (D)
▌7. John T. Harris (D)
▌8. Eppa Hutton, II (D)
▌9. Auburn Pridemore (D)

==== West Virginia ====
▌1. Benjamin Wilson (D)
▌2. Benjamin F. Martin (D)
▌3. John E. Kenna (D)

==== Wisconsin ====
▌1. Charles G. Williams (R)
▌2. Lucien B. Caswell (R)
▌3. George C. Hazelton (R)
▌4. William P. Lynde (D)
▌5. Edward S. Bragg (D)
▌6. Gabriel Bouck (D)
▌7. Herman L. Humphrey (R)
▌8. Thaddeus C. Pound (R)

==== Non-voting members ====
▌Arizona Territory. Hiram S. Stevens (D)
▌Dakota Territory. Jefferson P. Kidder (R)
▌Idaho Territory. Stephen S. Fenn (D)
▌Montana Territory. Martin Maginnis (D)
▌New Mexico Territory. Trinidad Romero (R)
▌Utah Territory. George Q. Cannon (R)
▌Washington Territory. Orange Jacobs (R)
▌Wyoming Territory. William W. Corlett (R)

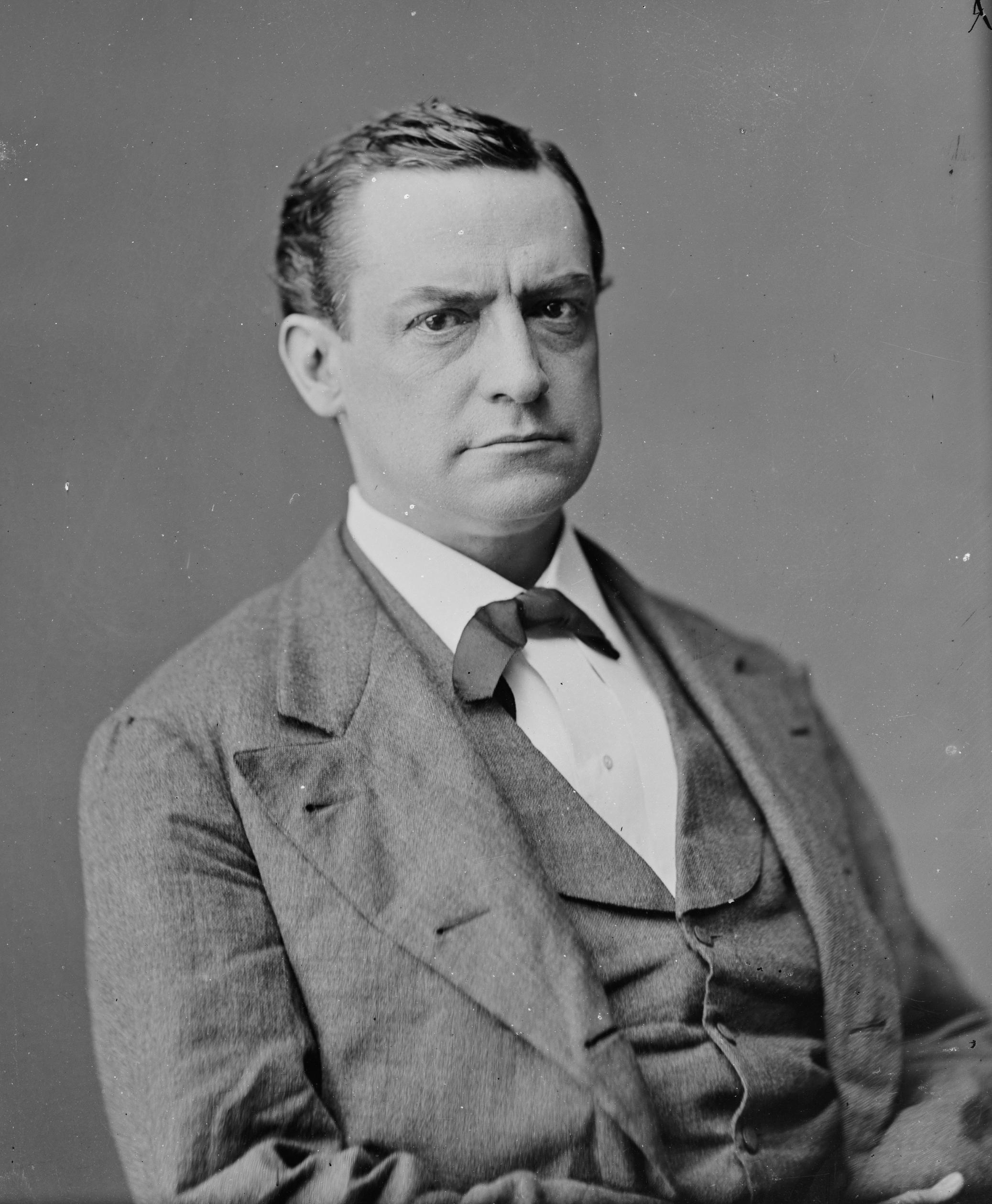
Speaker Samuel J. Randall

== Changes in membership ==
The count below reflects changes from the beginning of the first session of this Congress.

=== Senate ===
- Replacements: 5
  - Democratic: 1 seat net gain
  - Republican: 1 seat net loss
- Deaths: 2
- Resignations: 3
- Interim appointments: 1
- Contested elections: 0
- Total seats with changes: 5

Senate changes
State (class)	Vacated by	Reason for change	Successor	Date of successor's formal installation (Note: When seated or oath administered, not necessarily when service began.)
Ohio (3)	John Sherman (R)	Resigned March 8, 1877 to become U.S. Secretary of the Treasury. Successor elected March 21, 1877.	Stanley Matthews (R)	March 21, 1877
Pennsylvania (3)	Simon Cameron (R)	Resigned March 12, 1877. Successor elected March 20, 1877.	J. Donald Cameron (R)	March 20, 1877
Missouri (3)	Lewis V. Bogy (D)	Died September 20, 1877. Successor was appointed September 29, 1877, to continue the term.	David H. Armstrong (D)	September 29, 1877
Indiana (3)	Oliver P. Morton (R)	Died November 1, 1877. Successor elected January 31, 1879.	Daniel W. Voorhees (D)	November 6, 1877
Missouri (3)	David H. Armstrong (D)	Interim appointee retired. Successor elected January 26, 1879.	James Shields (D)	January 27, 1879
Michigan (1)	Isaac P. Christiancy (R)	Resigned February 10, 1879 due to ill health. Successor elected February 22, 1879.	Zachariah Chandler (R)	February 22, 1879

=== House of Representatives ===
- Replacements: 10
  - Democratic: 5 seat net gain
  - Republican: 5 seat net loss
- Deaths: 7
- Resignations: 1
- Contested election: 5
- Total seats with changes: 13

House changes
District	Vacated by	Reason for change	Successor	Date of successor's formal installation
Georgia 9th	Vacant	Rep. Benjamin Harvey Hill resigned in previous congress	Hiram P. Bell (D)	March 13, 1877
Colorado At-large	James B. Belford (R)	Lost contested election December 13, 1877	Thomas M. Patterson (D)	December 13, 1877
California 4th	Romualdo Pacheco (R)	Lost contested election February 7, 1878	Peter D. Wigginton (D)	February 7, 1878
Louisiana 3rd	Chester B. Darrall (R)	Lost contested election February 20, 1878	Joseph H. Acklen (D)	February 20, 1878
Louisiana 5th	John E. Leonard (R)	Died March 15, 1878	J. Smith Young (D)	November 5, 1878
Massachusetts 3rd	Walbridge A. Field (R)	Lost contested election March 28, 1878	Benjamin Dean (D)	March 28, 1878
New York 16th	Terence J. Quinn (D)	Died June 18, 1878	John M. Bailey (R)	November 5, 1878
Nebraska At-large	Frank Welch (R)	Died September 4, 1878	Thomas J. Majors (R)	November 5, 1878
Michigan 1st	Alpheus S. Williams (D)	Died December 21, 1878	Vacant	Not filled this term
Virginia 1st	Beverly B. Douglas (D)	Died December 22, 1878	Richard L. T. Beale (D)	January 23, 1879
Georgia 1st	Julian Hartridge (D)	Died January 8, 1879	William B. Fleming (D)	February 10, 1879
Texas 6th	Gustav Schleicher (D)	Died January 10, 1879	Vacant	Not filled this term
Florida 2nd	Horatio Bisbee Jr. (R)	Lost contested election February 20, 1879	Jesse J. Finley (D)	February 20, 1879

== Committees ==
Lists of committees and their party leaders for members of the House and Senate committees can be found through the Official Congressional Directory at the bottom of this article. The directory after the pages of terms of service lists committees of the Senate, House (Standing with Subcommittees, Select and Special) and Joint and, after that, House/Senate committee assignments. On the committees section of the House and Senate in the Official Congressional Directory, the committee's members on the first row on the left side shows the chairman of the committee and on the right side shows the ranking member of the committee.

=== Senate ===
- Agriculture (Chairman: Algernon S. Paddock; Ranking Member: Henry G. Davis)
- Appropriations (Chairman: William Windom; Ranking Member: Henry G. Davis)
- Audit and Control the Contingent Expenses of the Senate (Chairman: John P. Jones; Ranking Member: George R. Dennis)
- Civil Service and Retrenchment (Chairman: Henry M. Teller; Ranking Member: Thomas C. McCreery)
- Claims (Chairman: Samuel J. R. McMillan; Ranking Member: Francis M. Cockrell)
- Commerce (Chairman: Roscoe Conkling; Ranking Member: John B. Gordon)
- Distributing Public Revenue Among the States (Select)
- District of Columbia (Chairman: Stephen W. Dorsey; Ranking Member: Augustus S. Merrimon)
- Education and Labor (Chairman: Ambrose E. Burnside; Ranking Member: John B. Gordon)
- Elections of 1878 (Select)
- Engrossed Bills (Chairman: Thomas F. Bayard; Ranking Member: Henry B. Anthony)
- Epidemic Diseases (Select)
- Examine the Several Branches in the Civil Service (Select) (Chairman: Jerome B. Chaffee; Ranking Member: Augustus S. Merrimon)
- Finance (Chairman: Justin S. Morrill; Ranking Member: Thomas F. Bayard)
- Foreign Relations (Chairman: Hannibal Hamlin; Ranking Member: Thomas C. McCreery)
- Hot Springs (Arkansas) Commission (Special)
- Indian Affairs (Chairman: William B. Allison; Ranking Member: Thomas C. McCreery)
- Judiciary (Chairman: George F. Edmunds; Ranking Member: David Davis)
- Late Presidential Election Louisiana
- Manufactures (Chairman: Edward H. Rollins; Ranking Member: John W. Johnston)
- Mexican Relations (Select)
- Military Affairs (Chairman: George E. Spencer; Ranking Member: Theodore F. Randolph)
- Mines and Mining (Chairman: William Sharon; Ranking Member: Frank Hereford)
- Mississippi River Levee System (Select) (Chairman: Blanche Bruce; Ranking Member: Francis M. Cockrell)
- Naval Affairs (Chairman: Aaron A. Sargent; Ranking Member: William P. Whyte)
- Ordnance and War Ships (Select)
- Patents (Chairman: Newton Booth; Ranking Member: Francis Kernan)
- Pensions (Chairman: John J. Ingalls; Ranking Member: Robert E. Withers)
- Post Office and Post Roads (Chairman: Thomas W. Ferry; Ranking Member: Ambrose E. Burnside)
- Private Land Claims (Chairman: Allen G. Thurman; Ranking Member: Isaac P. Christiancy)
- Privileges and Elections (Chairman: Bainbridge Wadleigh; Ranking Member: John J. Ingalls)
- Public Lands (Chairman: Richard J. Oglesby; Ranking Member: Joseph E. McDonald)
- Railroads (Chairman: John H. Mitchell; Ranking Member: Stanley Matthews)
- Revision of the Laws (Chairman: Isaac P. Christiancy; Ranking Member: William A. Wallace)
- Revolutionary Claims (Chairman: John W. Johnston; Ranking Member: Henry L. Dawes)
- Rules (Chairman: James G. Blaine; Ranking Member: Augustus S. Merrimon)
- Tariff Regulation (Select)
- Tenth Census (Select) (Chairman: Justin S. Morrill; Ranking Member: N/A)
- Territories (Chairman: John J. Patterson; Ranking Member: Augustus H. Garland)
- Transportation Routes to the Seaboard (Select) (Chairman: Angus Cameron; Ranking Member: N/A)
- Treasury Department Account Discrepancies (Select) (Chairman: Henry G. Davis; Ranking Member: John J. Ingalls)
- Whole

=== House of Representatives ===
- Accounts (Chairman: Charles B. Roberts; Ranking Member: Henry W. Blair)
- Agriculture (Chairman: Augustus W. Cutler; Ranking Member: Walter L. Steele)
- Appropriations (Chairman: John DeWitt Clinton Atkins; Ranking Member: Eugene Hale)
- Banking and Currency (Chairman: Aylett H. Buckner; Ranking Member: Elizur K. Hart)
- Claims (Chairman: John M. Bright; Ranking Member: Daniel N. Lockwood)
- Coinage, Weights and Measures (Chairman: Alexander H. Stephens; Ranking Member: John B. Clarke)
- Commerce (Chairman: John H. Reagan; Ranking Member: John E. Kenna)
- District of Columbia (Chairman: Alpheus S. Williams then Joseph C.S. Blackburn; Ranking Member: Gabriel Bouck)
- Education and Labor (Chairman: John Goode; Ranking Member: Van H. Manning)
- Elections (Chairman: John T. Harris; Ranking Member: E. John Ellis)
- Enrolled Bills (Chairman: Andrew H. Hamilton; Ranking Member: Nelson H. Van Vorhes)
- Expenditures in the Interior Department (Chairman: William A.J. Sparks; Ranking Member: Edwin Willits)
- Expenditures in the Justice Department (Chairman: Edward S. Bragg; Ranking Member: Nicholas Muller)
- Expenditures in the Navy Department (Chairman: Benjamin A. Willis; Ranking Member: Jay A. Hubbell)
- Expenditures in the Post Office Department (Chairman: Jeremiah N. Williams; Ranking Member: Curtis H. Brogden)
- Expenditures in the State Department (Chairman: William M. Springer; Ranking Member: Thomas M. Bayne)
- Expenditures in the Treasury Department (Chairman: John M. Glover; Ranking Member: Henry L. Dickey)
- Expenditures in the War Department (Chairman: Joseph C. S. Blackburn; Ranking Member: Benjamin T. Eames)
- Expenditures on Public Buildings (Chairman: William P. Lynde; Ranking Member: William S. Stenger)
- Foreign Affairs (Chairman: Thomas Swann; Ranking Member: Benjamin Wilson)
- Indian Affairs (Chairman: Alfred M. Scales; Ranking Member: George M. Beebe)
- Invalid Pensions (Chairman: Americus V. Rice; Ranking Member: Clement H. Sinnickson)
- Judiciary (Chairman: J. Proctor Knott; Ranking Member: David B. Culberson)
- Levees and Improvements of the Mississippi River
- Manufactures (Chairman: Hendrick B. Wright; Ranking Member: Robert F. Ligon)
- Mileage (Chairman: Thomas R. Cobb; Ranking Member: Lorenzo Danford)
- Military Affairs (Chairman: Henry B. Banning; Ranking Member: Edward S. Bragg)
- Militia (Chairman: Miles Ross; Ranking Member: Thomas Turner)
- Mines and Mining (Chairman: George M. Beebe; Ranking Member: James T. Jones)
- Mississippi Levees (Chairman: Edward W. Robertson; Ranking Member: Benjamin F. Martin)
- Naval Affairs (Chairman: Washington C. Whitthorne; Ranking Member: Benjamin W. Harris)
- Pacific Railroads (Chairman: James W. Throckmorton; Ranking Member: Charles O'Neill)
- Patents (Chairman: Robert B. Vance; Ranking Member: Augustus W. Cutler)
- Post Office and Post Roads (Chairman: Alfred M. Waddell; Ranking Member: Terence J. Quinn then Joseph G. Cannon)
- Private Land Claims (Chairman: Thomas M. Gunter; Ranking Member: Dudley C. Denison)
- Public Buildings and Grounds (Chairman: Philip Cook; Ranking Member: James A. McKenzie)
- Public Expenditures (Chairman: Robert A. Hatcher; Ranking Member: Robert H.M. Davidson)
- Public Lands (Chairman: William R. Morrison; Ranking Member: William E. Smith)
- Railways and Canals (Chairman: George C. Cabell; Ranking Member: Alvah A. Clark)
- Revision of Laws (Chairman: William Walsh; Ranking Member: Walbridge A. Field)
- Rules (Select) (Chairman: Samuel J. Randall; Ranking Member: James A. Garfield)
- Revolutionary Pensions (Chairman: Levi A. Mackey; Ranking Member: William Kimmel)
- Standards of Official Conduct
- Territories (Chairman: Benjamin J. Franklin; Ranking Member: George A. Bagley)
- War Claims (Chairman: John R. Eden; Ranking Member: S. Addison Oliver)
- Ways and Means (Chairman: Fernando Wood; Ranking Member: William D. Kelley)
- Whole

=== Joint committees ===
- Conditions of Indian Tribes (Special)
- Enrolled Bills (Chairman: Rep. Andrew H. Hamilton; Vice Chairman: Rep. Nelson H. Van Vorhes)
- The Library (Chairman: Rep. Samuel S. Cox; Vice Chairman: Rep. Eugene Hale)
- Printing (Chairman: Rep. Otho R. Singleton; Vice Chairman: Rep. Latimer W. Ballou)
- Reorganization of the Army
- Transfer of the Indian Bureau

== Caucuses ==
- Democratic (House)
- Democratic (Senate)

== Employees ==
=== Legislative branch agency directors ===
- Architect of the Capitol: Edward Clark
- Librarian of Congress: Ainsworth Rand Spofford
- Public Printer of the United States: John D. Defrees

=== Senate ===
- Chaplain: Byron Sunderland (Presbyterian)
- Librarian: George F. Dawson
- Secretary: George C. Gorham
- Sergeant at Arms: John R. French

=== House of Representatives ===
- Chaplain: I.L. Townsend (Episcopalian), until October 15, 1877
  - John Poise (Methodist), until December 3, 1877
  - W. P. Harrison (Methodist), elected December 3, 1877
- Clerk: George M. Adams
- Clerk at the Speaker’s Table: William H. Scudder
  - J. Randolph Tucker Jr.
- Doorkeeper: John W. Polk, elected October 17, 1877
  - Charles W. Field, elected April 8, 1878
- Postmaster: James M. Steuart
- Reading Clerks: Thomas S. Pettit (D) and Neill S. Brown Jr. (R)
- Sergeant at Arms: John G. Thompson

== See also ==
- 1876 United States elections (elections leading to this Congress)
  - 1876 United States presidential election
  - 1876–77 United States Senate elections
  - 1876–77 United States House of Representatives elections
- 1878 United States elections (elections during this Congress, leading to the next Congress)
  - 1878–79 United States Senate elections
  - 1878–79 United States House of Representatives elections
