= Edward K. Valentine =

American politician

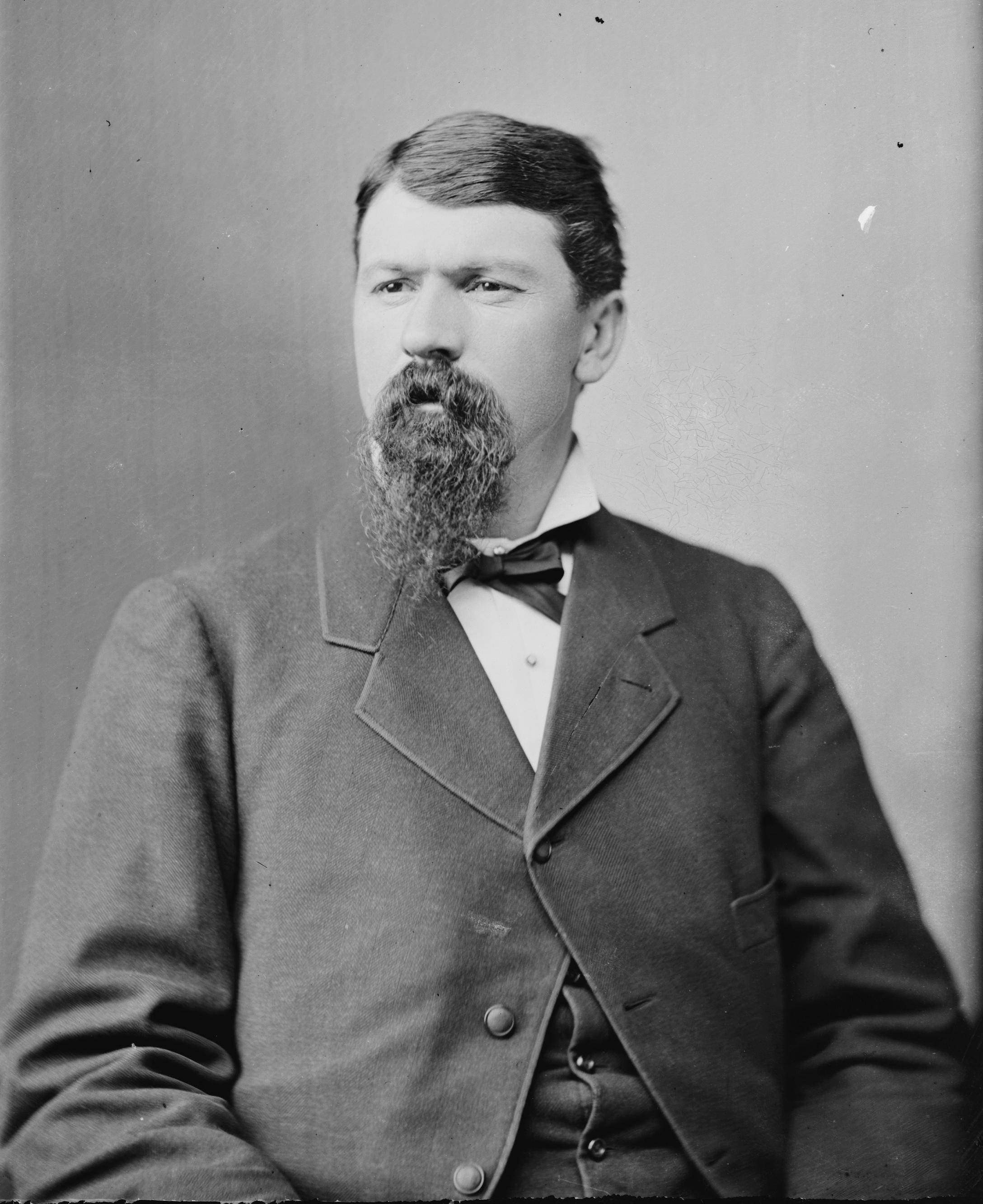

Sergeant at Arms of the United States Senate
- In office June 30, 1890 – August 7, 1893
- Preceded by: William P. Canaday
- Succeeded by: Richard J. Bright

Member of the U.S. House of Representatives from Nebraska
- In office March 4, 1879 – March 3, 1885
- Preceded by: Thomas J. Majors (AL); District established (3rd)
- Succeeded by: District eliminated (AL); George W. E. Dorsey (3rd)
- Constituency: At-large district (1879-83); 3rd district (1883-85)

Personal details
- Born: Edward Kimble Valentine; June 1, 1843 Keosauqua, Iowa Territory
- Died: April 11, 1916 (aged 72) Chicago, Illinois, U.S.
- Party: Republican

Edward Kimble Valentine (June 1, 1843 – April 11, 1916) was an American Republican Party politician.

== Biography ==
Born in Keosauqua, Iowa, he attended common schools and learned to become a printer. During the Civil War he was a member in the Union army served in the Illinois Volunteer Infantry in the Sixty-seventh Regiment. He was promoted to second lieutenant and then honorably discharged. He reenlisted in the spring of 1863 as a private in the Seventh Iowa Volunteer Cavalry. He was promoted to adjutant of the regiment and served until 1866.

He settled in Omaha, Nebraska, in 1866. He was appointed register of the United States General Land Office in West Point, Nebraska, serving from May 17, 1869, to September 30, 1871. He studied law and was admitted to the bar in 1869, setting up practice in West Point.

He was elected judge to the sixth judicial district in 1875. He ran in Nebraska at-large for the Forty-sixth and Forty-seventh congress, being elected as a Republican both times. He was elected to the newly created 3rd district of Nebraska to the Forty-eighth Congresses. In all he served from March 4, 1879, to March 3, 1885. During his time in the Forty-seventh Congress he was the chairman of the U.S. House Committee on Agriculture. He declined to be a candidate for renomination in 1884. He was the United States Senate Sergeant at Arms from June 30, 1890, to August 6, 1893. After that he resumed practicing law in West Point. He retired to Chicago, Illinois, in 1908, where he later died. He was buried in Union Ridge Cemetery, Norwood Park, Illinois.

== Honors ==
Valentine, Nebraska, is named for him.

== Notes ==
1. "Valentine, Edward Kimble". The Political Graveyard.
- United States Congress. "Edward K. Valentine (id: V000005)". Biographical Directory of the United States Congress. Retrieved on 2008-02-15

U.S. House of Representatives
Preceded by Thomas Jefferson Majors	Member of the U.S. House of Representatives from Nebraska's at-large congressional district March 4, 1879 – March 3, 1883	Succeeded by Seat abolished
Preceded by Seat created	Member of the U.S. House of Representatives from Nebraska's 3rd congressional district March 4, 1883 – March 3, 1885	Succeeded by George W. E. Dorsey
Political offices
Preceded by William P. Canaday	Sergeant at Arms of the United States Senate; 1890–1893	Succeeded by Richard J. Bright
