= Nebraska's at-large congressional district =

- Obsolete district
- Created: 1867
- Eliminated: 1880
- Years active: 1867-1883

From statehood in 1867 until 1883, Nebraska had only one congressional district. Its representative was elected at-large statewide.

In 1883, after the 1880 census, Nebraska was apportioned more representatives who were elected from geographically based districts, thereby obviating the need for an at-large representative.

== List of members representing the district ==
Member	Party	Years of service	Cong ress	Electoral history
District established March 2, 1867
Turner M. Marquett (Plattsmouth)	Republican	March 2, 1867 – March 3, 1867	39th	Previously elected delegate from the Territory of Nebraska to the United States Congress. Elected in June 1866 in special election in anticipation of Nebraska's admission to the Union (March 1, 1867). Retired.
John Taffe (Omaha)	Republican	March 4, 1867 – March 3, 1873	40th 41st 42nd	Elected in October 1866. Re-elected in 1868. Re-elected in 1870. Retired.
Lorenzo Crounse (Fort Calhoun)	Republican	March 4, 1873 – March 3, 1877	43rd 44th	Elected in 1872. Re-elected in 1874. Retired.
Frank Welch (Norfolk)	Republican	March 4, 1877 – September 4, 1878	45th	Elected in 1876. Died.
Vacant		September 4, 1878 – November 5, 1878	45th	
Thomas Jefferson Majors (Peru)	Republican	November 5, 1878 – March 3, 1879	45th	Elected to finish Welch's term. Claimed to be (unrecognised) second member of Nebraska's House delegation.
Edward K. Valentine (West Point)	Republican	March 4, 1879 – March 3, 1883	46th 47th	Elected in 1878. Re-elected in 1880. Redistricted to the 3rd district.
District eliminated March 4, 1883
