= Thomas Jefferson Majors =

American politician (1841–1932)

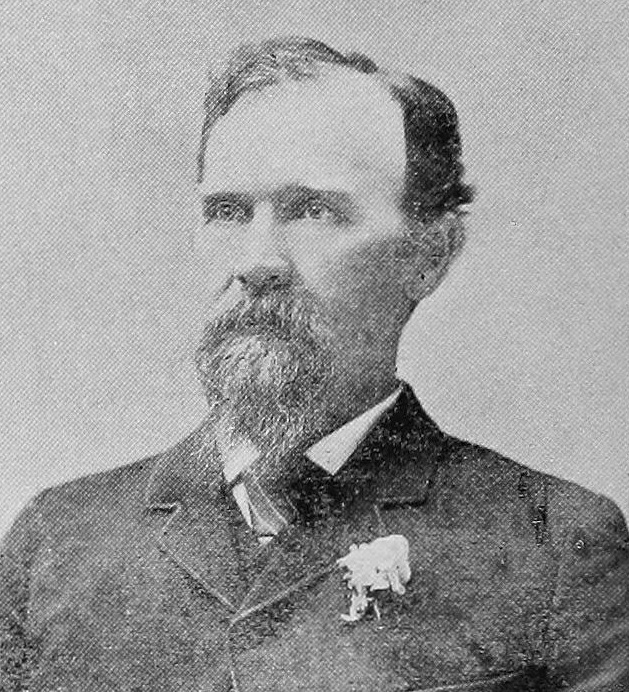

6th Lieutenant Governor of Nebraska
- In office 1891–1895
- Governor: John Milton Thayer; James E. Boyd; Lorenzo Crounse
- Preceded by: George de Rue Meiklejohn
- Succeeded by: Robert E. Moore

Member of the U.S. House of Representatives from Nebraska's at-large district
- In office November 5, 1878 – March 3, 1879
- Preceded by: Frank Welch
- Succeeded by: Edward K. Valentine

Personal details
- Born: June 25, 1841 Libertyville, Iowa Territory
- Died: July 11, 1932 (aged 91) Peru, Nebraska, U.S.
- Party: Republican

Military service
- Allegiance: United States
- Years of service: 1861–1866
- Rank: lieutenant colonel
- Battles/wars: American Civil War

Thomas Jefferson Majors (June 25, 1841 – July 11, 1932) was a Republican politician from the U.S. state of Nebraska.

He was born in Libertyville, Iowa, on June 25, 1841, and attended the Nebraska state normal school. He moved to Peru, Nebraska, in 1860 and entered the Union Army in June 1861 as a first lieutenant of Company C, First Regiment, Nebraska Volunteer Infantry. He served successively as captain, major, and lieutenant colonel of that regiment and was mustered out June 15, 1866.

He was a member of the last Nebraska Territorial council in 1866, and its equivalent after Nebraska was accepted as a state, the first Nebraska State senate, from 1867 to 1869. He was appointed assessor of internal revenue for the Nebraska district in 1869 until the offices of collector and assessor were merged into one.

He was elected as a Republican to the Forty-fifth United States Congress as the second member of Nebraska's house congressional delegation. He did not present his credentials and was not seated as the house only recognized Nebraska as having one representative. When the recognized representative, Frank Welch, died, he ran and subsequently was elected. He was elected to both the Forty-sixth and Forty-seventh United States Congresses again as the second member of the delegation, but the House, on February 24, 1883, disallowed Nebraska’s claim to an additional Member and refused to seat him.

He returned to Nebraska and became the director of Citizens’ State Bank of Peru. He was elected to the Nebraska State House of Representatives in 1889, and became the sixth Lieutenant Governor of Nebraska from 1891 to 1895 serving under three different Governors John Milton Thayer, James E. Boyd and Lorenzo Crounse. He ran for Governor of Nebraska in 1894 against Silas A. Holcomb, but lost. He then served as a member and president of the State board of education. He died in Peru on July 11, 1932, and was buried in Mount Vernon Cemetery, Peru.

Party political offices
Preceded by Lorenzo Crounse	Republican nominee for Governor of Nebraska; 1894	Succeeded by John H. McColl
U.S. House of Representatives
Preceded by Frank Welch	Member of the U.S. House of Representatives from Nebraska's at-large congressional district November 5, 1878 – March 3, 1879	Succeeded by Edward K. Valentine
Political offices
Preceded by George D. Meiklejohn	Lieutenant Governor of Nebraska; 1891 – 1895	Succeeded by Robert E. Moore
