= Frank Welch (American politician) =

American politician (1835–1878)

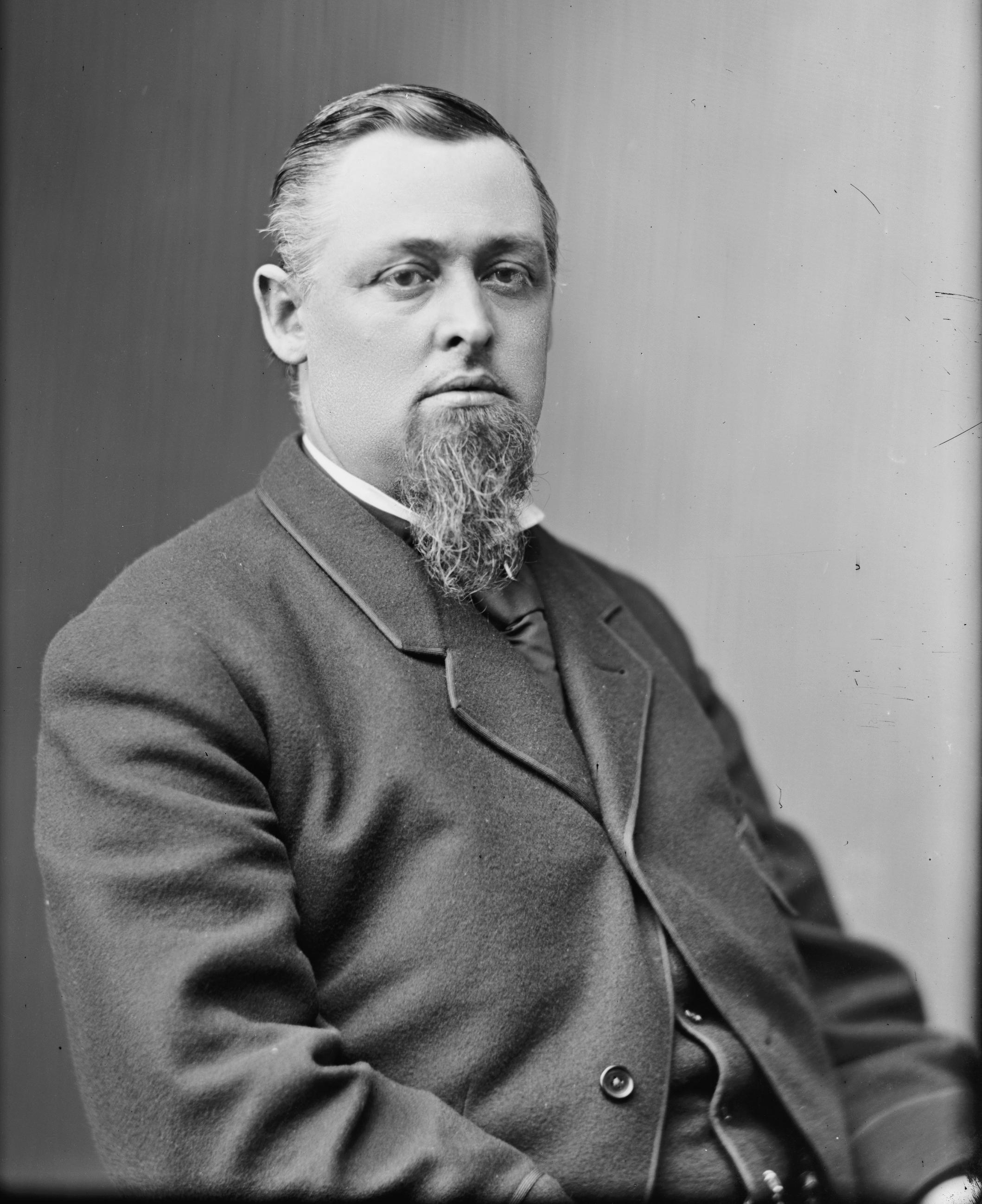

Member of the U.S. House of Representatives from Nebraska's at-large district
- In office March 4, 1877 – September 4, 1878
- Preceded by: Lorenzo Crounse
- Succeeded by: Thomas Jefferson Majors

1st President of the Nebraska Senate
- In office July 4, 1866 – July 11, 1866
- Preceded by: Eliphus H. Rogers (Territorial)
- Succeeded by: Eliphus H. Rogers

Personal details
- Born: February 10, 1835 Charlestown, Boston, U.S.
- Died: September 4, 1878 (aged 43) Neligh, Nebraska, U.S.
- Resting place: Forest Hills Cemetery, Jamaica Plain, Massachusetts
- Party: Republican

Frank Welch (February 10, 1835 – September 4, 1878) was a Nebraska Republican politician.

He was born at Bunker Hill, Charlestown, Massachusetts, on February 10, 1835, and moved to Boston with his parents. He graduated from Boston High School and took up civil engineering. He moved to the Nebraska Territory in 1857 to Decatur, Nebraska, serving as postmaster.

He served in the Nebraska Territorial council in 1864 and was presiding officer of the Territorial House of Representatives in 1865, also serving in the house in 1866. He was a register of the land office at West Point, Nebraska, from 1871 to 1876. He was elected as a Republican to the Forty-fifth United States Congress, serving from March 4, 1877, until his death in Neligh, Nebraska, on September 4, 1878. He is interred in Forest Hills Cemetery, Jamaica Plain, Massachusetts.

== See also ==
- List of members of the United States Congress who died in office (1790–1899)

U.S. House of Representatives
Preceded by Lorenzo Crounse	Member of the U.S. House of Representatives from Nebraska's at-large congressional district March 4, 1877 – September 4, 1878	Succeeded by Thomas Jefferson Majors
