= David H. Armstrong =

American politician (1812–1893)

David Hartley Armstrong
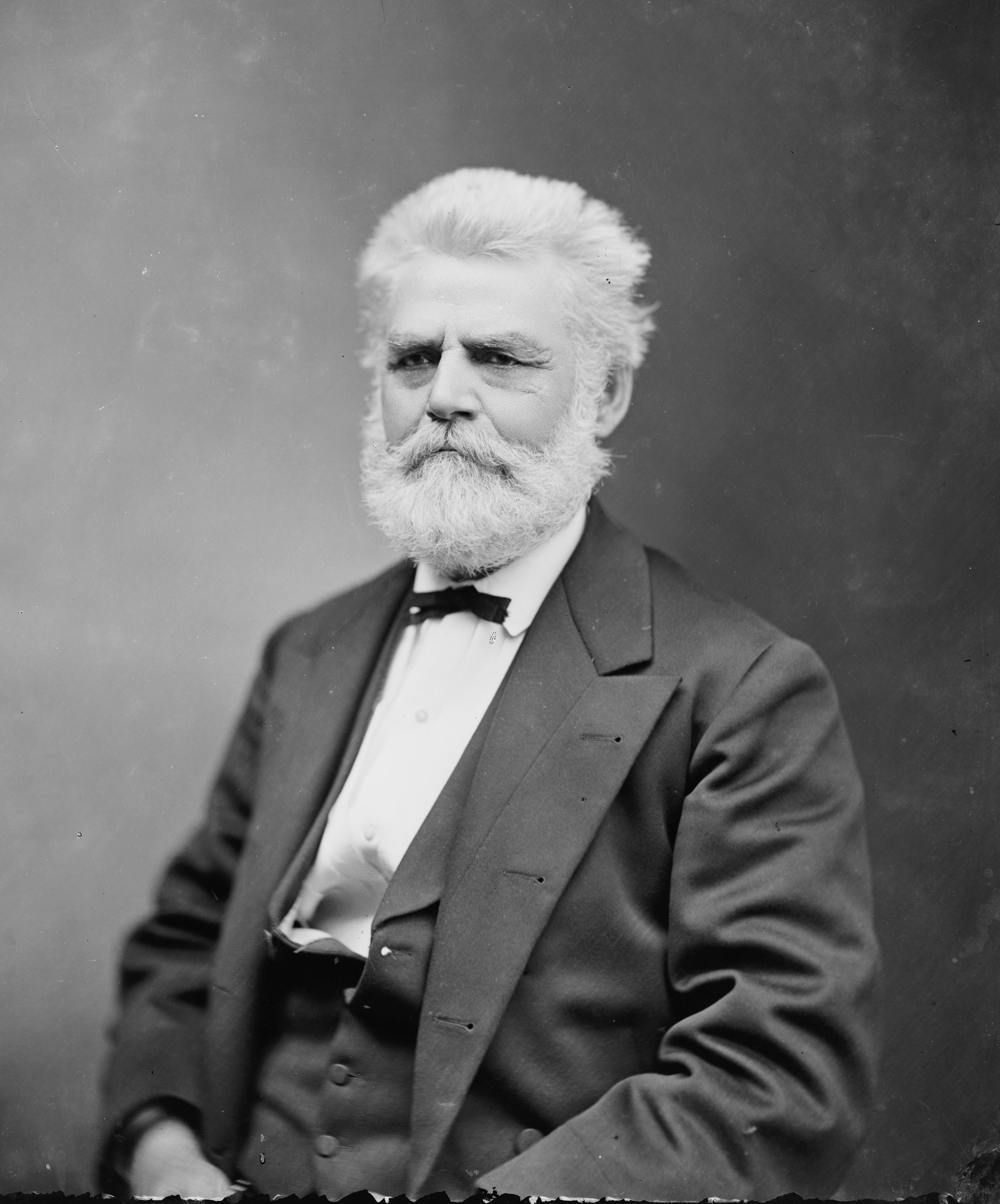

United States Senator from Missouri
- In office September 29, 1877 – January 26, 1879
- Appointed by: John S. Phelps
- Preceded by: Lewis V. Bogy
- Succeeded by: James Shields

Personal details
- Born: October 21, 1812 Nova Scotia, British Canada
- Died: March 18, 1893 (aged 80) St. Louis, Missouri, US
- Party: Democratic
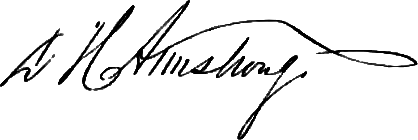
- Signature

David Hartley Armstrong (October 21, 1812 – March 18, 1893) was a United States senator from Missouri.

== Biography ==
Born in Nova Scotia, British Canada, he attended Maine Wesleyan Seminary and taught school in New Bedford, Massachusetts from 1833 to 1837. He moved to St. Louis, Missouri in 1837, and then to Lebanon, Illinois, where he taught at McKendree College (now McKendree University). He returned to Missouri and was principal of the public school at Benton from 1838 to 1847, comptroller of St. Louis from 1847 to 1850, postmaster of St. Louis from 1854 to 1858 and a member of the board of police commissioners from 1873 to 1876.

Armstrong served as a member of the board of freeholders which framed the charter of St. Louis in 1876, and was appointed as a Democrat to the U.S. Senate to fill the vacancy caused by the death of Lewis V. Bogy, serving from September 29, 1877, to January 26, 1879, when a successor was elected and qualified. Armstrong was not a candidate for reelection in 1879; and in 1893 died in St. Louis. Interment was in Bellefontaine Cemetery.

Armstrong was Vice President of the St. Louis Board and helped command the July 27, 1877 cavalry attack on the strikers outside Schuler Hall, the headquarters of the Executive Committee coordinating the St. Louis General strike. He reportedly yelled from a shady side of the street for his policemen to "Ride 'em down!".

== See also ==
- List of United States senators born outside the United States

U.S. Senate
Preceded by Lewis V. Bogy	U.S. senator (Class 3) from Missouri; 1877–1879; Served alongside: Francis M. Cockrell	Succeeded by James Shields
