= Lewis V. Bogy =

American politician (1813–1877)

Lewis Vital Bogy
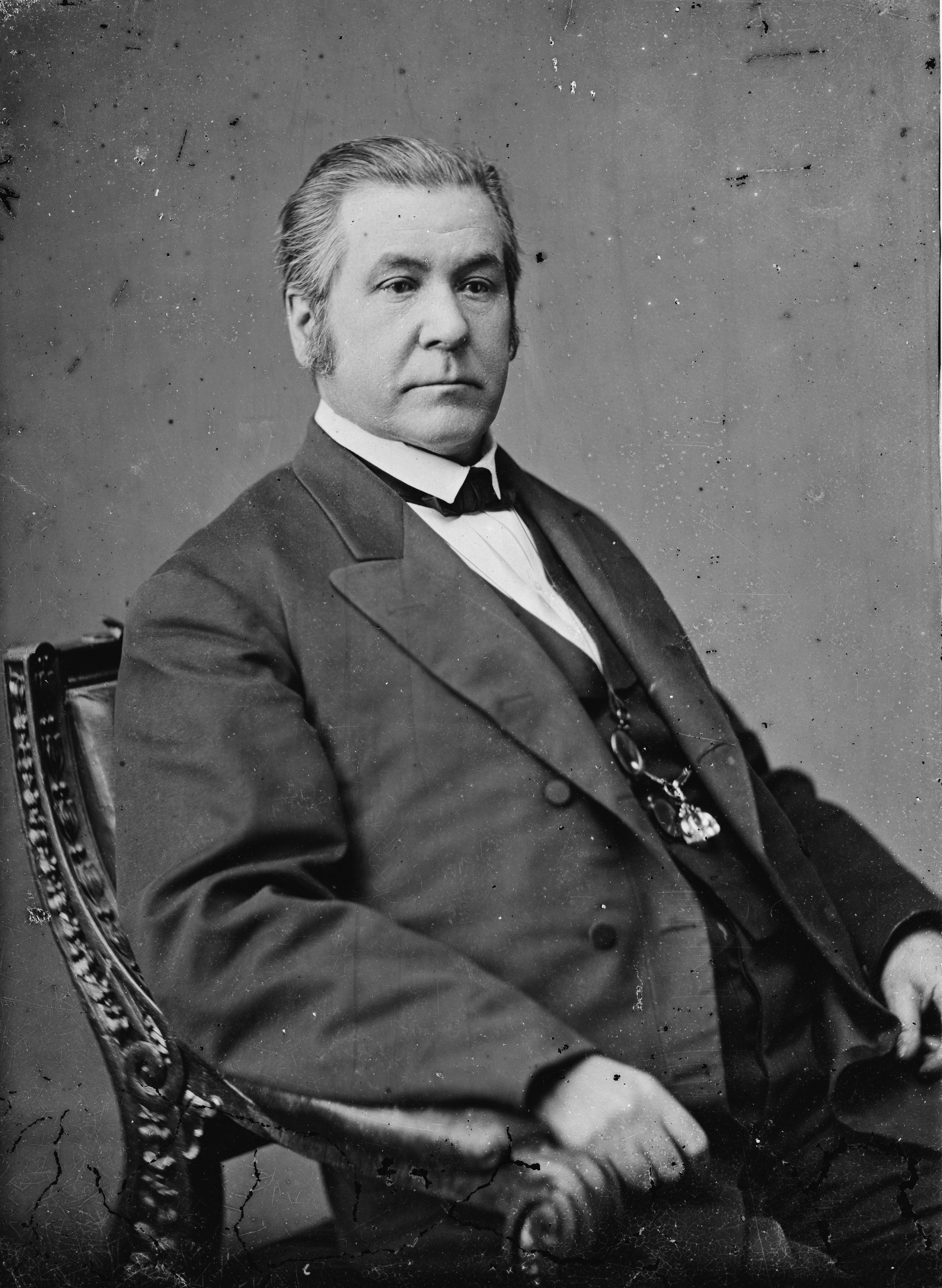
- Bogy, 1870–1877

United States Senator from Missouri
- In office March 4, 1873 – September 20, 1877
- Preceded by: Francis P. Blair Jr.
- Succeeded by: David H. Armstrong

14th Commissioner of Indian Affairs
- In office 1866–1867
- President: Andrew Johnson
- Preceded by: Dennis N. Cooley
- Succeeded by: Nathaniel Green Taylor

President of the St. Louis Board of Aldermen
- In office 1872

Member of the Missouri House of Representatives
- In office 1840–1841; 1854–1855

St. Louis Alderman
- In office 1838

Personal details
- Born: April 9, 1813 Ste. Genevieve, Missouri, US
- Died: September 20, 1877 (aged 64) St. Louis, Missouri, US
- Resting place: Calvary Cemetery
- Party: Democratic
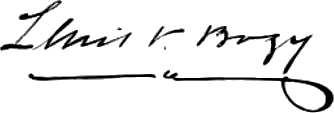
- Signature

Lewis Vital Bogy (April 9, 1813 – September 20, 1877) was a United States senator from Missouri.

== Biography ==
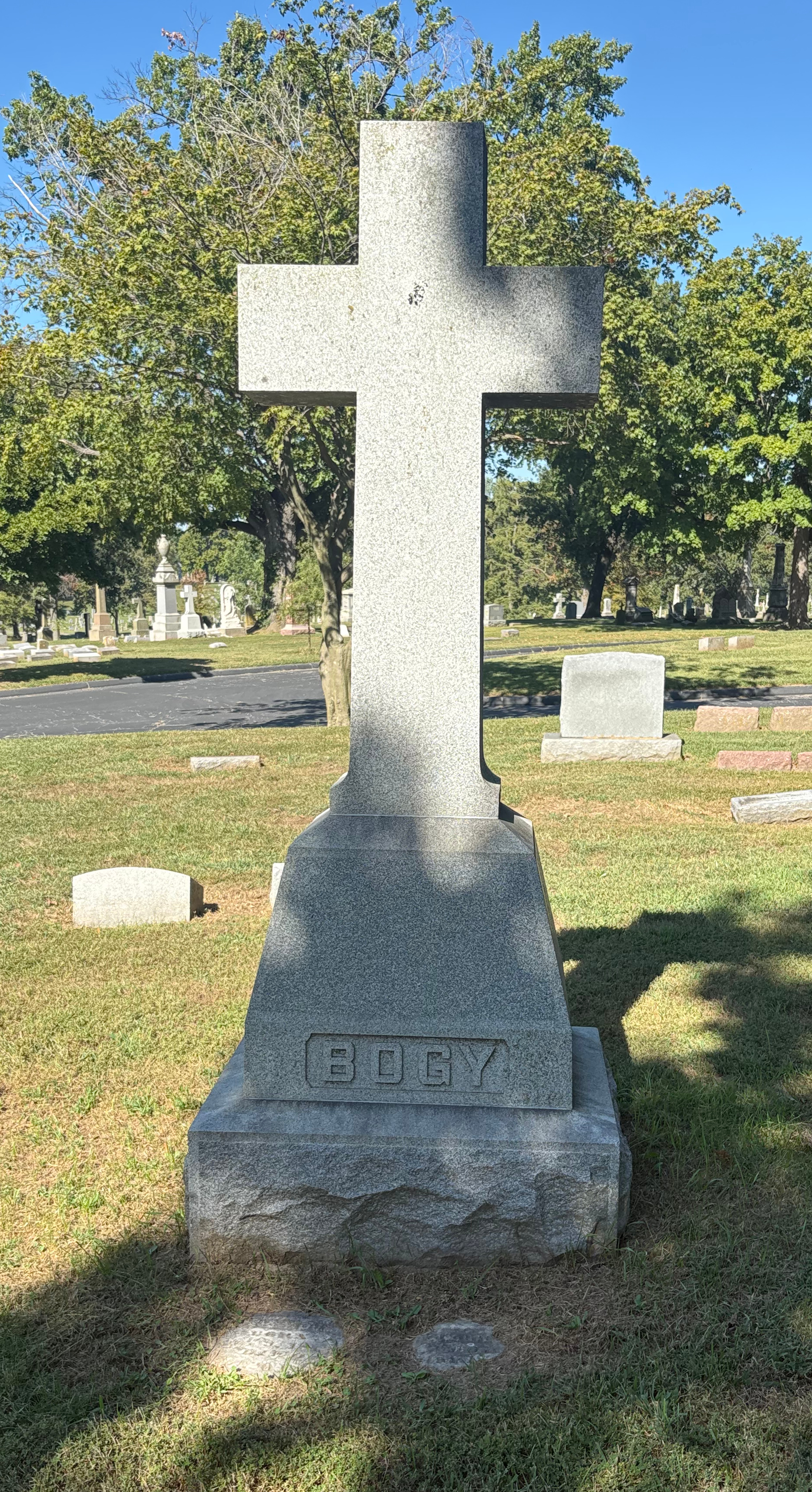
Bogy's grave at Calvary Cemetery

Born in Ste. Geneviève, he attended the public schools, was employed as clerk in a mercantile establishment, studied law in Illinois, graduated from Transylvania University (Lexington, Kentucky) in 1835 and commenced practice in St. Louis. He served in the Black Hawk War, was a member of the board of aldermen of St. Louis in 1838, and was a member of the Missouri House of Representatives in 1840–1841 and 1854–1855. He was Commissioner of Indian Affairs in 1866 and 1867, and president of the city council of St. Louis in 1872. Bogy was one of the founders of the St. Louis Iron Mountain Railway, acting as president for two years.

Bogy was elected as a Democrat to the U.S. Senate and served from March 4, 1873, until his death in St. Louis in 1877; he was buried at Calvary Cemetery section 1.

== See also ==
- List of members of the United States Congress who died in office (1790–1899)

== Works ==
- Bogy, Lewis Vital (1891). In Office; a Story of Washington Life and Society. The Ariel Library. Extra no., B. Chicago: F. J. Schulte & Company.

== Notes ==
- United States Congress. "Lewis V. Bogy (id: B000595)". Biographical Directory of the United States Congress.

U.S. Senate
Preceded by Francis P. Blair Jr.	U.S. senator (Class 3) from Missouri; 1873–1877; Served alongside: Carl Schurz, Francis M. Cockrell	Succeeded by David H. Armstrong
