= Mary Ridder =

Nebraska Public Service Commission member (born 1957)

Member of the Nebraska Public Service Commission from the 5th district
- In office January 5, 2017 – January 5, 2023
- Preceded by: Jerry Vap
- Succeeded by: Kevin Stocker

Personal details
- Born: March 7, 1957 (age 69) Schuyler, Nebraska
- Party: Republican
- Spouse: John Ridder
- Children: 6
- Education: Creighton University (B.A.)
- Occupation: Rancher

Mary Ridder (née Guynan, born March 7, 1957) is a Republican politician from the state of Nebraska who served as a member of the Nebraska Public Service Commission from 2017 to 2023.

== Early career ==
Ridder was born in Schuyler, Nebraska, in 1957, and graduated from Schuyler Central High School in 1975. She later attended Creighton University, graduating with her bachelor's degree in 1979. Ridder settled in Callaway, where she worked as a rancher. In 2006, she ran for the Callaway School Board, and served on the Board until 2014.

== Nebraska Public Service Commission ==
Ridder challenged incumbent Public Service Commissioner Jerry Vap in the Republican primary in 2016. She argued that she would bring a "valuable rural and landowner perspective" to the commission, citing her experience as a rancher. Ridder campaigned on improving access to internet and phone service in the most rural parts of the state. The race between Ridder and Vap was close, and after all precincts were counted on election night, Ridder had a 57-vote lead, which shrank to 36 votes when the votes were canvassed and certified. In response, the Board of State Canvassers ordered a recount. Following the recount, Ridder's victory over Vap was confirmed to be 46 votes. Ridder faced no competition in the general election and was elected unopposed.

In 2017, when the Public Service Commission voted to approve the controversial Keystone XL pipeline with an alternative route by a 3–2 vote, Ridder and Democrat Crystal Rhoades voted against it. In opposing the pipeline's construction, Ridder criticized the routes proposed by TransCanada would have harmful effects on fragile soul in the region, and both Rhoades and Ridder argued that the proposed route could affect the Ogallala Aquifer.

Ridder was elected Chair of the Public Service Commission in 2018, and served as Chair through 2020.

Ridder ran for re-election in 2022. She was challenged in the Republican primary by businessman Kevin Stocker and Dakota Delka. Stocker self-funded his campaign and significantly outspent Ridder, who did not raise or spend enough to file a campaign finance report under state law. Ultimately, Stocker narrowly defeated Ridder, winning 41 percent of the vote to her 39 percent.
