= 2022 Nebraska elections =

Nebraska state elections in 2022 were held in the U.S. state of Nebraska on November 8, 2022. All three of Nebraska's seats in the United States House of Representatives were up for election; all of the state's executive officers were up for election; half of the seats in the Nebraska Legislature were up; and several seats each were up on the Public Service Commission, State Board of Education, and Board of Regents.

== United States Congress ==
All of Nebraska's three seats in the United States House of Representatives were up for election in 2022.

=== Results ===
District	Republican		Democratic		Others		Total		Result
District	Votes	%	Votes	%	Votes	%	Votes	%	Result
District 1	129,236	57.91%	93,929	42.09%	0	0.00%	223,165	100.0%	Republican hold
District 2	112,663	51.33%	106,807	48.67%	0	0.00%	219,470	100.0%	Republican hold
District 3	172,700	78.30%	34,836	15.79%	13,016	5.90%	220,552	100.0%	Republican hold
Total	411,034	62.71%	231,511	35.32%	13,016	1.96%	663,187	100.0%	

Popular vote
Republican	62.71%
Democratic	35.32%
Other	1.96%

House seats
Republican	100.00%

== Governor and Lieutenant Governor ==
Incumbent Republican Governor Pete Ricketts was ineligible to seek a third consecutive term as Governor. Jim Pillen, a member of the University of Nebraska Board of Regents, won the Republican primary to succeed him. He faced State Senator Carol Blood, the Democratic nominee, in the general election and defeated her in a landslide.

2022 Nebraska gubernatorial election
Party	Candidate	Votes	%	±%
Republican	Jim Pillen; Joe Kelly	398,334	59.22%	+0.22%
Democratic	Carol Blood; Al Davis	242,006	35.98%	−5.02%
Libertarian	Scott Zimmerman; Jason Blumenthal	26,455	3.93%	—
Write-in		5,798	0.86%	—
Total votes		672,593	100.00%	
Turnout		682,716	54.93%	
Republican hold				

== Attorney General ==
Incumbent Attorney General Doug Peterson declined to seek a third consecutive term. Mike Hilgers, the Speaker of the Legislature, won the Republican primary to succeed him. The only candidate that Hilgers faced in the general election was Larry Bolinger, the nominee of the Legal Marijuana Now Party. Hilgers defeated Bolinger with nearly 70% of the vote.

2022 Nebraska Attorney General election
Party	Candidate	Votes	%	±%
Republican	Mike Hilgers	434,671	69.73%	−30.27%
Legal Marijuana Now	Larry Bolinger	188,649	30.27%	—
Majority		246,022	39.47%	−60.53%
Turnout		623,320		
Republican hold				

== Secretary of State ==
Incumbent Secretary of State Bob Evnen ran for re-election to a second term. He won the Republican primary win a 44% plurality and was unopposed in the general election.

2022 Nebraska Secretary of State election
Party	Candidate	Votes	%
Republican	Bob Evnen (inc.)	500,342	100.00%
Total votes		500,342	100.00%
Republican hold			

== State Treasurer ==
Incumbent State Treasurer John Murante ran for re-election to a second term. He won the Republican primary and then faced Libertarian candidate Katrina Tomsen in the general election, winning 72% of the vote.

2022 Nebraska State Treasurer election
Party	Candidate	Votes	%	±%
Republican	John Murante (inc.)	431,193	72.21%	−27.79%
Libertarian	Katrina Tomsen	165,951	27.79%	—
Majority		265,242	44.42%	−55.58%
Turnout		597,144		
Republican hold				

== Auditor of Public Accounts ==
2022 Nebraska Auditor of Public Accounts election
- November 8, 2022
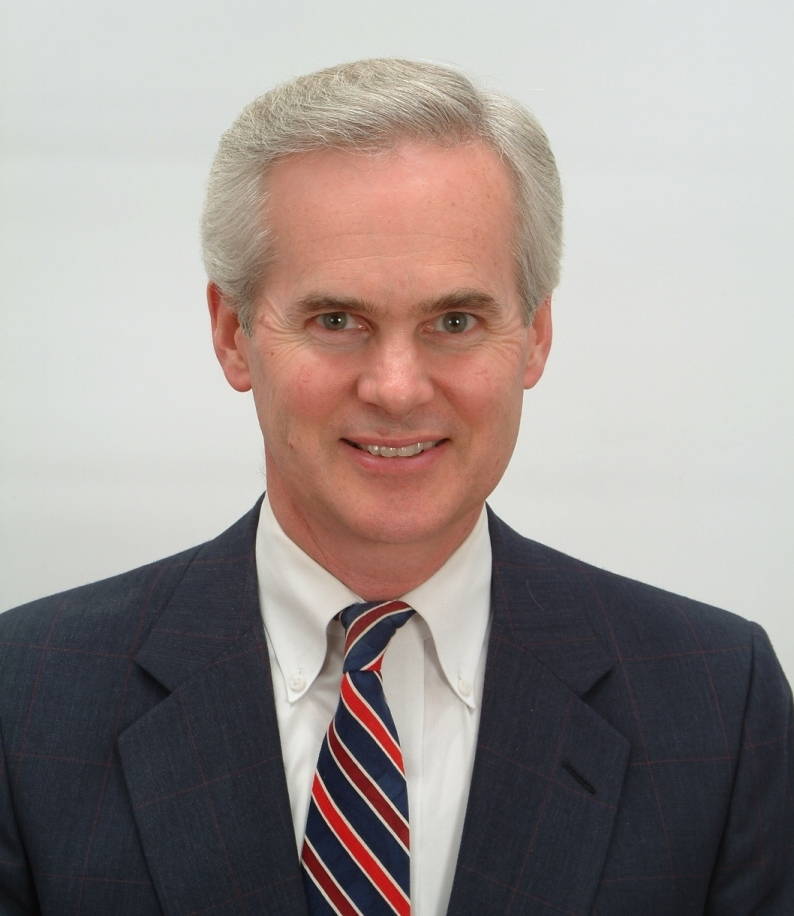

Candidate	Mike Foley	L. Leroy Lopez	Gene Siadek
Party	Republican	Legal Marijuana Now	Libertarian
Popular vote	429,169	120,987	76,223
Percentage	68.52%	19.32%	12.17%
- Foley: 50–60% 60–70% 70–80% 80–90% >90%
State Auditor before election
Charlie Janssen
Republican
Elected State Auditor
Mike Foley
Republican

Incumbent Auditor Charlie Janssen declined to seek a third term. Lieutenant Governor Mike Foley, who previously served as Auditor from 2007 to 2015, won the Republican primary to succeed him. He then defeated two independent candidates in the general election.

2022 Nebraska Auditor of Public Accounts election
Party	Candidate	Votes	%	±%
Republican	Mike Foley	429,169	68.52%	+10.96%
Legal Marijuana Now	L. Leroy Lopez	120,987	19.32%	—
Libertarian	Gene Siadek	76,223	12.17%	—
Majority		308,182	49.20%	+34.08%
Turnout		597,144		
Republican hold				

== Public Service Commission ==
=== District 4 ===
Incumbent Public Service Commissioner Rod Johnson ran for re-election. He was opposed in the Republican primary by Geneva Mayor Eric Kamler, who criticized Johnson for his poor attendance record on the Commission. Kamler ultimately defeated Johnson by a wide margin in the primary and was unopposed in the general election.

==== Republican primary ====
===== Candidates =====
- Eric Kamler, Mayor of Geneva
- Rod Johnson, incumbent Public Service Commissioner

===== Results =====
Republican primary results
Party	Candidate	Votes	%
Republican	Eric Kamler	32,418	57.57%
Republican	Rod Johnson (inc.)	23,901	42.43%
Total votes		56,319	100.00%

==== General election ====
2022 District 4 election
Party	Candidate	Votes	%
Republican	Eric Kamler	104,862	100.00%
Total votes		104,862	100.00%
Republican hold			

=== District 5 ===
Incumbent Public Service Commissioner Mary Ridder ran for re-election. She was opposed by businessman Kevin Stocker and Dakota Delka in the Republican primary. Stocker narrowly defeated Ridder and faced no opposition in the general election.

==== Republican primary ====
===== Candidates =====
- Kevin Stocker, Scottsbluff businessman
- Mary Ridder, incumbent Public Service Commissioner
- Dakota Delka

===== Results =====
Republican primary results
Party	Candidate	Votes	%
Republican	Kevin Stocker	22,590	41.43%
Republican	Mary Ridder (inc.)	21,154	38.78%
Republican	Dakota Delka	8,260	15.14%
Total votes		54,604	100.00%

==== General election ====
2022 District 5 election
Party	Candidate	Votes	%
Republican	Kevin Stocker	102,665	100.00%
Total votes		102,665	100.00%
Republican hold			

== State Board of Education ==
Four seats were up on the State Board of Education in 2022: Districts 5, 6, 7, and 8. Across the state, a slate of socially conservative candidates backed by Protect Nebraska Children, a political action committee, ran to win a conservative majority on the Board. The slate was opposed to the teaching of "critical race theory" and to proposed sexual health standards considered by the Board. Three of the four members of the slate were elected, with incumbent Kirk Penner winning re-election in District 5, Sherry Jones winning an open seat in District 6, and Elizabeth Tegtmeier defeating incumbent Board Member Robin Stevens in District 7.

=== District 5 ===
Incumbent member Kirk Penner, who was appointed to the Board of Education in 2021 by Governor Pete Ricketts, ran for re-election to a full term. He was opposed by retired professor Helen Raikes, whom he defeated.

==== Candidates ====
- Kirk Penner, incumbent Board Member
- Helen Raikes, retired University of Nebraska–Lincoln early childhood studies professor

==== Primary election results ====
Nonpartisan primary results
Party	Candidate	Votes	%
Nonpartisan	Kirk Penner (inc.)	32,492	60.73%
Nonpartisan	Helen Raikes	21,007	39.27%
Total votes		53,499	100.00%

==== General election results ====
Nonpartisan primary results
Party	Candidate	Votes	%
Nonpartisan	Kirk Penner (inc.)	43,050	54.71%
Nonpartisan	Helen Raikes	35,631	45.29%
Total votes		78,681	100.00%

=== District 6 ===
Incumbent Board Member Maureen Nickels declined to seek re-election to a third term. Two retired teachers, Sherry Jones and Danielle Helzer, ran to succeed her. Jones, who was part of the conservative slate of candidates, defeated Helzer in a landslide.

==== Candidates ====
- Sherry Jones, retired teacher and school counselor
- Danielle Helzer, retired English teacher and writing coach

==== Primary election results ====
Nonpartisan primary results
Party	Candidate	Votes	%
Nonpartisan	Sherry Jones	29,756	69.17%
Nonpartisan	Danielle Helzer	13,267	30.83%
Total votes		43,023	100.00%

==== General election results ====
Nonpartisan general results
Party	Candidate	Votes	%
Nonpartisan	Sherry Jones	41,463	66.13%
Nonpartisan	Danielle Helzer	21,196	33.87%
Total votes		62,659	100.00%

=== District 7 ===
Incumbent Board Member Robin Stevens ran for re-election to a second term. He was opposed by former public school teacher Elizabeth Tegtmeier and retired pastor Pat Moore. Tegtmeier was part of the conservative slate of candidates for the Board, and placed first in the primary election by a wide margin. In the general election, Tegtmeier defeated Stevens for re-election in a landslide.

==== Candidates ====
- Elizabeth Tegtmeier, former public school teacher
- Robin Stevens, incumbent Board Member
- Pat Moore, retired pastor

==== Primary election results ====
Nonpartisan primary results
Party	Candidate	Votes	%
Nonpartisan	Elizabeth Tegtmeier	33,304	59.73%
Nonpartisan	Robin Stevens (inc.)	10,698	19.12%
Nonpartisan	Pat Moore	9,149	16.31%
Total votes		53,151	100.00%

==== General election results ====
Nonpartisan general results
Party	Candidate	Votes	%
Nonpartisan	Elizabeth Tegtmeier	53,088	70.53%
Nonpartisan	Robin Stevens (inc.)	22,195	29.47%
Total votes		75,283	100.00%

=== District 8 ===
Incumbent Board Member Deborah Neary ran for re-election to a second term. She was opposed in the primary election by massage therapist Marni Hodges, who was a part of the conservative slate of candidates, and former Board Member John Sieler. At the primary election, Neary placed first, and Hodgen narrowly edged out Sieler for the second slot. The ensuing general election became one of the most contentious races statewide, and Neary narrowly defeated Hodges, winning re-election with 52% of the vote.

==== Candidates ====
- Deborah Neary
- Marni Hodgen
- John Sieler

==== Primary election results ====
Nonpartisan primary results
Party	Candidate	Votes	%
Nonpartisan	Deborah Neary (inc.)	23,843	44.92%
Nonpartisan	Marni Hodgen	13,291	25.07%
Nonpartisan	John Sieler	11,748	22.13%
Total votes		48,882	100.00%

==== General election results ====
Nonpartisan general results
Party	Candidate	Votes	%
Nonpartisan	Deborah Neary (inc.)	41,717	51.89%
Nonpartisan	Marni Hodgen	38,660	48.11%
Total votes		80,377	100.00%

== University of Nebraska Board of Regents ==
=== District 6 ===
Incumbent Regent Paul Kenney ran for re-election to a second term. Former Grand Island City Councilwoman Julie Hehnke ran against him. Kenney narrowly won re-election.

==== Candidates ====
- Paul R. Kenney
- Julie Hehnke

==== Primary election results ====
Nonpartisan primary results
Party	Candidate	Votes	%
Nonpartisan	Paul R. Kenney (inc.)	22,399	51.97%
Nonpartisan	Julie Hehnke	21,184	48.03%
Total votes		43,583	100.00%

==== General election results ====
Nonpartisan general results
Party	Candidate	Votes	%
Nonpartisan	Paul R. Kenney (inc.)	34,705	54.13%
Nonpartisan	Julie Hehnke	29,420	45.87%
Total votes		64,125	100.00%

=== District 7 ===
Incumbent Regent Bob Phares declined to seek re-election to a fourth term, creating an open seat. State Senator Matt Williams, former State Board of Education member Kathy Wilmot, and Nolan Gurnsey ran to succeed him. Williams and Wilmot placed first and second in the primary election and advanced to the general election. Williams was endorsed by Regent Jim Pillen, the Republican nominee for Governor, as well as several other regents, while Wilmot was endorsed by Governor Pete Ricketts. The Nebraska Future Fund, a political action committee funded by the Ricketts family, spent several hundred thousand dollars attacking Williams as a "Republican in Name Only (RINO)," and elevating Wilmot, who claimed that the courses in the university system were "liberal leaning." Ultimately, Wilmot defeated Williams, winning 54% of the vote.

==== Candidates ====
- Matt Williams, State Senator
- Kathy Wilmot, former State Board of Education Member
- Nolan Gurnsey

==== Primary election results ====
Nonpartisan primary results
Party	Candidate	Votes	%
Nonpartisan	Matt Williams	22,380	39.48%
Nonpartisan	Kathy Wilmot	20,532	36.46%
Nonpartisan	Nolan Gurnsey	6,079	10.79%
Total votes		56,991	100.00%

==== General election results ====
Nonpartisan general results
Party	Candidate	Votes	%
Nonpartisan	Kathy Wilmot	39,539	54.39%
Nonpartisan	Matt Williams	33,121	45.61%
Total votes		72,660	100.00%

== See also ==
- Elections in Nebraska
- Political party strength in Nebraska
- Nebraska Democratic Party
- Nebraska Republican Party
- Government of Nebraska
- 2022 United States elections
