= 2026 Nebraska Public Service Commission election =

2026 Nebraska Public Service Commission District 2 election
- November 3, 2026
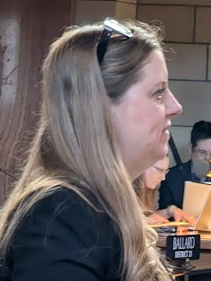

Candidate	Wendy DeBoer	Dennis McCann
Party	Democratic	Republican
Popular vote	84,500	39,509
Percentage	68.1%	31.9%
Commissioner before election
Christian Mirch
Republican
Elected Commissioner
Wendy DeBoer
Democratic

The 2026 Nebraska Public Service Commission election was held on November 3, 2026, to elect one member to the Nebraska Public Service Commission to a six-year term. Primary elections were held on May 12. Incumbent Republican commissioner Christian Mirch was appointed in 2023 by Governor Jim Pillen and is not running for a full term in office.

== Background ==
The commission currently consists of five Republican members. District 2, the only seat up for election in 2026, is located in eastern Douglas County. It is the most Democratic-leaning district on the commission.

== Republican primary ==
Mirch was appointed in January 2023 after Crystal Rhoades, a Democratic commissioner, was elected to serve as the Douglas County Clerk of the District Court.

=== Candidates ===
==== Nominee ====
- Dennis McCann, retired public safety worker

==== Declined ====
- Christian Mirch, incumbent commissioner

=== Results ===
Republican primary
Party	Candidate	Votes	%
Republican	Dennis McCann	15,518	100.0
Total votes		15,518	100.0

== Democratic primary ==
=== Candidates ===
==== Nominee ====
- Wendy DeBoer, state legislator from the 10th district (2019–present)

=== Endorsements ===
Wendy DeBoer

Political parties

- Nebraska Democratic Party

=== Results ===
Democratic primary
Party	Candidate	Votes	%
Democratic	Wendy DeBoer	34,905	100.0
Total votes		34,905	100.0

== General election ==
=== Results ===
2026 Nebraska Public Service Commission election, district 2
Party	Candidate	Votes	%
Democratic	Wendy DeBoer	84,500	68.14
Republican	Dennis McCann	39,509	31.86
Total votes		124,009	100.00

== See also ==
- Nebraska Public Service Commission
- Elections in Nebraska
- 2026 United States elections
- 2024 Nebraska elections#Public Service Commission
