= Mike Boyle =

American politician (1944–2021)

Member of the Douglas County Board of Commissioners from the 1st district
- In office September 30, 1997 – September 12, 2021
- Preceded by: Bernice Labedz
- Succeeded by: Roger Garcia

40th Mayor of Omaha, Nebraska
- In office June 1981 – January 1987
- Preceded by: Al Veys
- Succeeded by: Stephen Tomasek, Jr.

Personal details
- Born: Michael David Boyle; January 19, 1944 Los Angeles, California, U.S.
- Died: September 10, 2021 (aged 77) Omaha, Nebraska, U.S.
- Party: Democratic
- Spouse: Anne Boyle (m. 1965; died 2019)
- Children: 5
- Education: Creighton University (B.A.); Creighton University School of Law (J.D.)
- Profession: Attorney, Politician

Michael David Boyle (January 19, 1944 – September 10, 2021) was an American Democratic politician from Nebraska who served as mayor of Omaha and later as a member of the Douglas County Board of Commissioners. He was a lawyer in private practice in Omaha for over 30 years.

== Biography ==
Educated in Catholic schools in Omaha, Boyle graduated from Creighton University in 1973 with a degree in economics and management from the Business Administration School. He graduated from the Creighton University School of Law in 1977.

Mike married Anne Howell on April 24, 1965, at St. Cecilia Cathedral in Omaha. They had five children and 18 grandchildren. Anne Boyle was the first woman elected in the 130-year history of the Nebraska Public Service Commission. She was re-elected in 2008, and was a former chair of the Nebraska Democratic Party. She led the Bill Clinton for President campaign in Nebraska and the re-election campaign as well. Anne Boyle died in 2019 after suffering a stroke.

== Political career ==
Boyle was elected mayor of Omaha in 1981 and re-elected in 1985.

In October 1986, a recall campaign was initiated against Boyle after a controversial dismissal of the Omaha Chief of Police. In October 1985, police lieutenant Tony Infantino wrote a memo titled "Mission Impossible," describing a plan to target and surveil the mayor's brother-in-law, John Howell, and attempt to arrest him on suspicion of drunken driving. This was meant to provide an opportunity for Boyle to interfere with the criminal justice process.

The arrest of the mayor's brother-in-law was carried out, and an investigation by Omaha Public Safety Director Keith Lant followed. Lant held that there was both an improper plot and subsequent cover-up, and demanded that Omaha Chief of Police Robert C. Wadman discipline the involved officers. Chief Wadman refused Lant's orders to co-sign the disciplinary notices based on his personal beliefs, despite the results of polygraph examinations of the command officers. Lant proceeded to personally issue the disciplinary notices against the officers, and recommended the dismissal of Wadman for insubordination.

The Personnel Board of the City of Omaha, a panel of citizens, unanimously approved Lant's disciplinary notices and Wadman's dismissal. The Douglas County District Court upheld the disciplinary notices, but overturned Wadman's dismissal by the Personnel Board. The overturned dismissal was appealed by a citizen to the Supreme Court of Nebraska, which reversed the District Court's decision and found the Personnel Board's order to dismiss Robert Wadman to be legal.

Supporters of the recall effort obtained 34,816 signatures on recall petitions, significantly more than the 19,669 signatures needed to force a recall election. The recall election was held in January 1987, and drew an exceptionally large turnout of over 98,000 voters, 56.4 percent of those registered. Boyle was removed from office as a result of the election, in which the vote was 56 percent for his recall and 44 percent for his retention.

In 1989, Boyle ran for re-election as mayor. He finished first out of a field of six in the primary, though he lost to P.J. Morgan, a former State Senator, in the general election. In 1990, Boyle ran for governor. He lost the Democratic primary by less than one vote per precinct Statewide. Ben Nelson was nominated and served two terms as governor before being elected a United States senator.

In 1997, Boyle was appointed to the Douglas County Board of Commissioners after Bernice Labedz resigned for health reasons, serving until his death in 2021.

In March 2021, Boyle was diagnosed with lung cancer and began treatment. On September 2, 2021, he suffered complications of diabetes that required him to be hospitalized. He died on September 10, 2021, at the age of 77.

== See also ==
- Government of Omaha
- History of Omaha

Preceded by Al Veys	Mayor of Omaha; 1981 - 1987	Succeeded by Stephen Tomasek, Jr.
