= 2024 United States House of Representatives elections in Nebraska =

- November 5, 2024

All 3 Nebraska seats to the United States House of Representatives
	Majority party	Minority party
Party	Republican	Democratic
Last election	3	0
Seats won	3	0
Seat change	Steady	Steady
Popular vote	591,238	338,154
Percentage	63.62%	36.38%
Swing	▲0.91%	▲1.06%

Republican
50–60%
60–70%
70–80%
80–90%
>90%
Democratic
50–60%

The 2024 United States House of Representatives elections in Nebraska were held on November 5, 2024, to elect the three U.S. representatives from the State of Nebraska, one from each of the state's congressional districts. The elections coincided with the 2024 U.S. presidential election, other elections to the House of Representatives, elections to the United States Senate, and various state and local elections. The primary elections were held on May 14, 2024.

== Overview ==
=== Statewide ===
Party	Candi- dates	Votes		Seats		
Party	Candi- dates	No.	%	No.	+/–	%
Republican Party	3	591,238	63.62%	3	Steady	100%
Democratic Party	3	338,154	36.38%	0	Steady	0%
Total	6	929,392	100%	3	Steady	100%

Popular vote
Republican	63.62%
Democratic	36.38%

House seats
Republican	100.0%

=== District ===
District	Republican		Democratic		Total		Result
District	Votes	%	Votes	%	Votes	%	Result
District 1	187,559	60.10%	124,498	39.90%	312,057	100.0%	Republican hold
District 2	160,198	50.93%	154,369	49.07%	314,567	100.0%	Republican hold
District 3	243,481	80.42%	59,287	19.58%	302,768	100.0%	Republican hold
Total	591,238	63.62%	338,154	36.38%	929,392	100.0%	

== District 1 ==
2024 Nebraska's 1st congressional district election
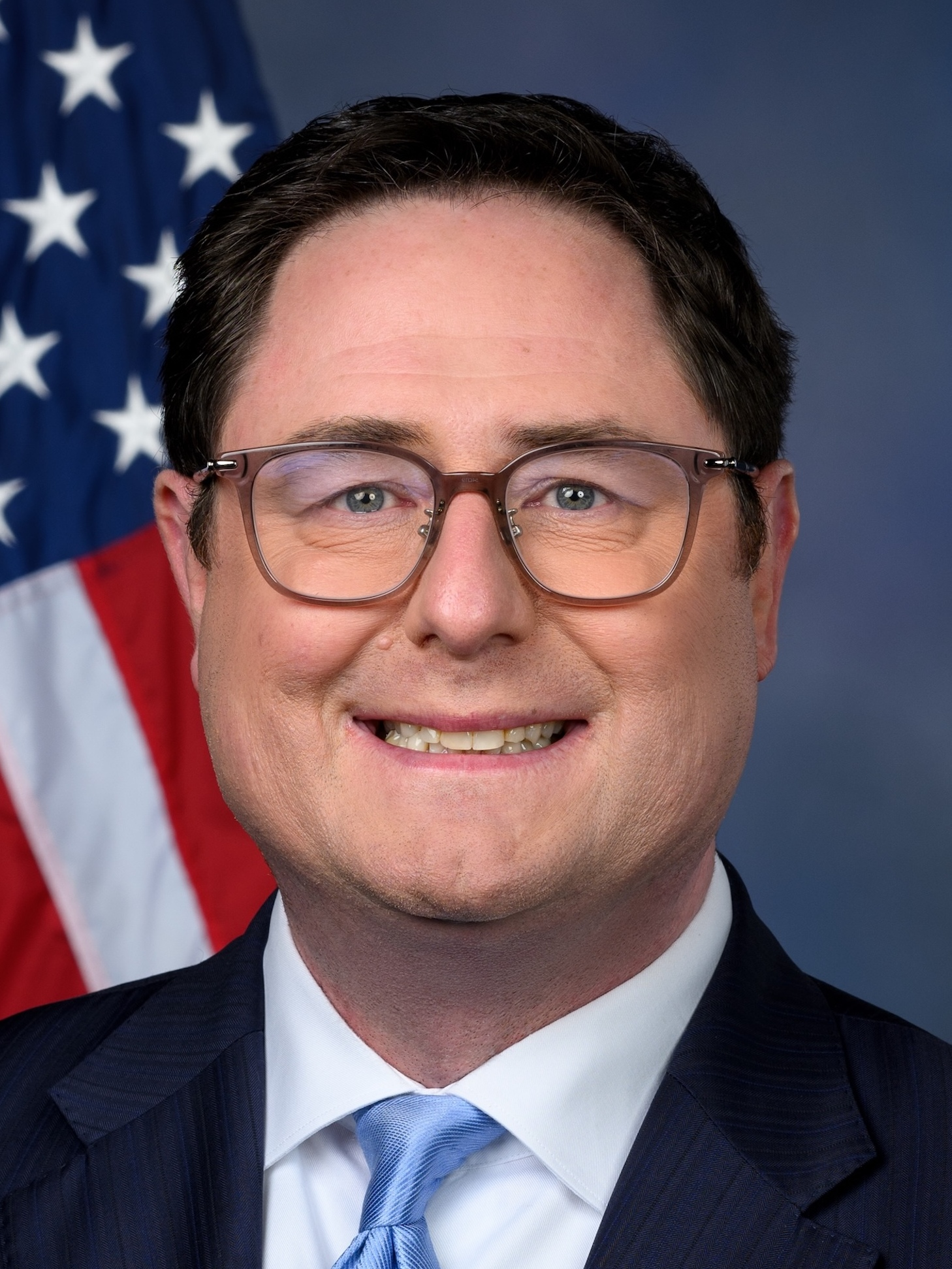

Nominee	Mike Flood	Carol Blood
Party	Republican	Democratic
Popular vote	187,559	124,498
Percentage	60.10%	39.90%
- Flood: 50–60% 60–70% 70–80% 80–90% >90% Blood: 50–60% 60–70% 70–80% Tie: 50%
U.S. Representative before election
Mike Flood
Republican
Elected U.S. Representative
Mike Flood
Republican

The 1st district is located in eastern Nebraska surrounding Omaha and its suburbs, taking in Lincoln, Bellevue, Fremont, and Norfolk. The incumbent was Republican Mike Flood, who was re-elected with 57.9% of the vote in 2022.

=== Republican primary ===
==== Nominee ====
- Mike Flood, incumbent U.S. representative

==== Eliminated in primary ====
- Michael Connely, education advisor and candidate for governor in 2022

==== Endorsements ====
Mike Flood

Organizations

- AIPAC
- National Rifle Association Political Victory Fund
- National Right to Life Committee
- Nebraska Farm Bureau
- U.S. Chamber of Commerce (post-primary)

==== Fundraising ====
Campaign finance reports as of April 24, 2024
Candidate	Raised	Spent	Cash on hand
Michael Connely (R)	$0	$0	$0
Mike Flood (R)	$1,279,065	$928,355	$357,582
Source: Federal Election Commission

==== Results ====
Republican primary results
Party	Candidate	Votes	%
Republican	Mike Flood (incumbent)	56,846	81.53%
Republican	Michael Connely	12,884	18.48%
Total votes		69,730	100.00%

=== Democratic primary ===
==== Nominee ====
- Carol Blood, state senator and nominee for governor in 2022

==== Endorsements ====
Carol Blood

State legislators

- George Dungan III, state senator

Organizations

- Vote Mama

Labor unions

- National Education Association

==== Fundraising ====
Campaign finance reports as of April 24, 2024
Candidate	Raised	Spent	Cash on hand
Carol Blood (D)	$36,076	$20,647	$15,428
Source: Federal Election Commission

==== Results ====
Democratic primary results
Party	Candidate	Votes	%
Democratic	Carol Blood	34,888	100.00%
Total votes		34,888	100.00%

=== General election ===
==== Predictions ====
Source	Ranking	As of
The Cook Political Report	Solid R	April 29, 2024
Inside Elections	Solid R	March 10, 2023
Sabato's Crystal Ball	Safe R	February 23, 2023
Elections Daily	Safe R	October 5, 2023
CNalysis	Solid R	November 16, 2023

==== Polling ====
Poll source	Date(s) administered	Sample size (Note: Key: A – all adults RV – registered voters LV – likely voters V – unclear)	Margin of error	Mike Flood (R)	Carol Blood (D)	Other	Undecided
YouGov (Note: Poll sponsored by The Economist)	October 21–28, 2024	406 (LV)	–	53%	39%	1% (Note: "Someone else" with 1%)	7%

==== Results ====
2024 Nebraska's 1st congressional district election
Party	Candidate	Votes	%
Republican	Mike Flood (incumbent)	187,559	60.10%
Democratic	Carol Blood	124,498	39.90%
Total votes		312,057	100.00%
Republican hold			

== District 2 ==
2024 Nebraska's 2nd congressional district election
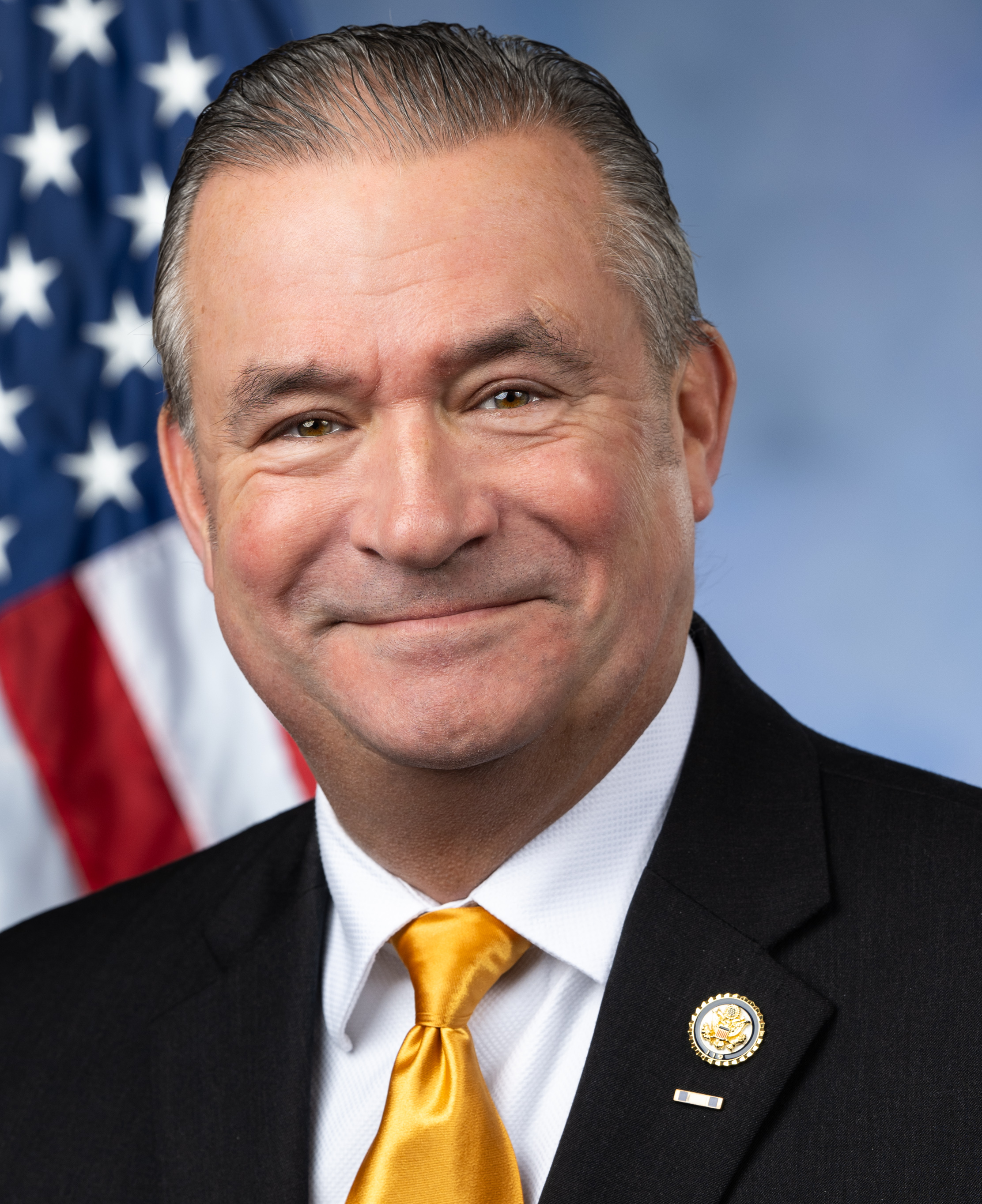

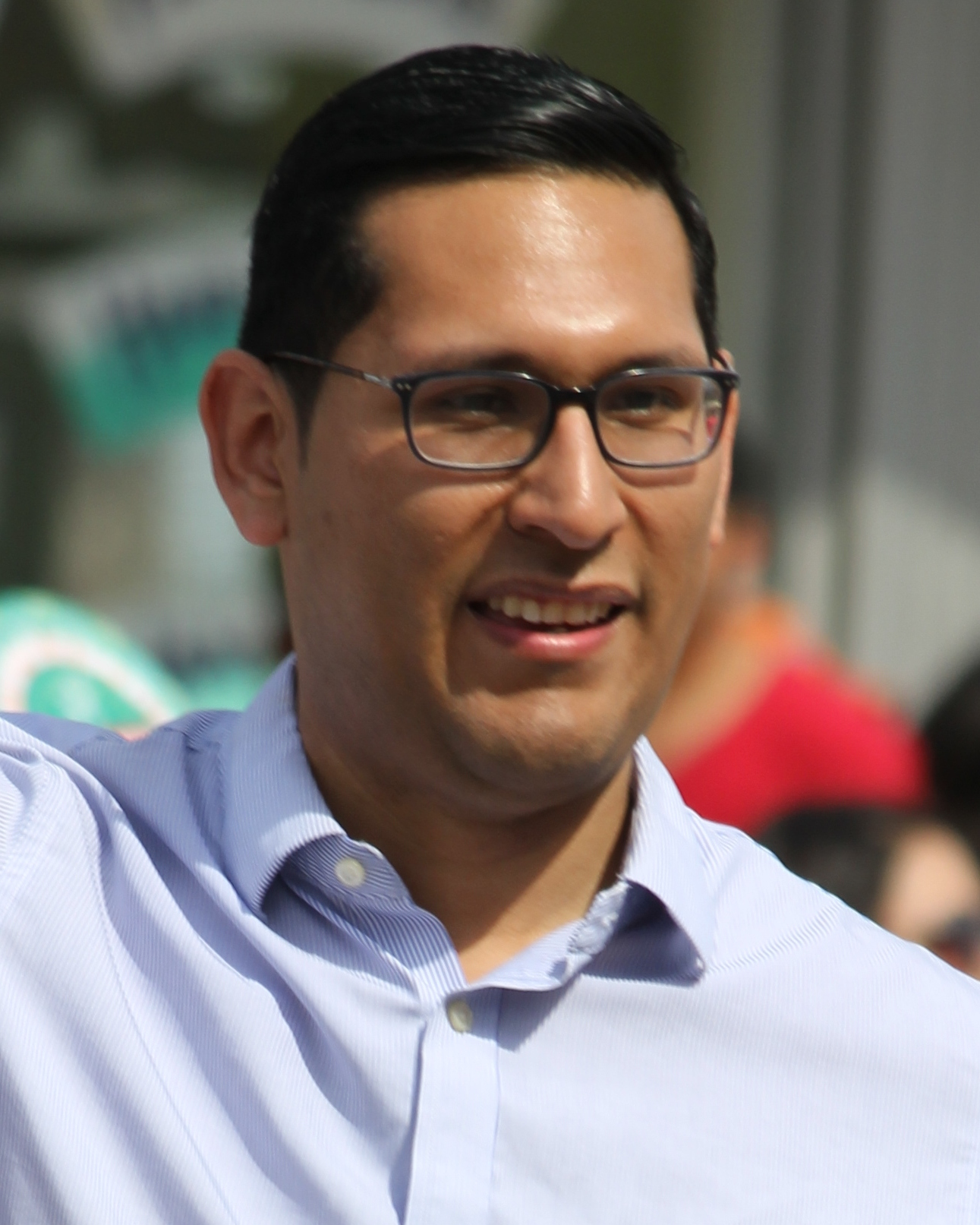
Nominee	Don Bacon	Tony Vargas
Party	Republican	Democratic
Popular vote	160,198	154,369
Percentage	50.93%	49.07%
- Bacon: 50–60% 60–70% 70–80% 80–90% Vargas: 50–60% 60–70% 70–80% 80–90%
U.S. Representative before election
Don Bacon
Republican
Elected U.S. Representative
Don Bacon
Republican

The 2nd district covers the Omaha metropolitan area, including all of Douglas County, home to the city of Omaha, Saunders County, and suburban parts of northern Sarpy County, including La Vista and Papillon. The incumbent was Republican Don Bacon, who was re-elected with 51.3% of the vote in 2022.

=== Republican primary ===
==== Nominee ====
- Don Bacon, incumbent U.S. representative

==== Eliminated in primary ====
- Dan Frei, businessman, former member of the Nebraska Republican Party State Central Committee, and candidate for this district in 2014

==== Withdrawn ====
- Michael Connely, education advisor and candidate for governor in 2022 (endorsed Frei, switched to the 1st district)

==== Declined ====
- Robert Anthony, real estate broker (endorsed Frei)

==== Endorsements ====
Don Bacon

U.S. executive branch officials

- John Bolton, national security advisor (2018–2019), United States Ambassador to the United Nations (2005–2006)
- Donald Trump, 45th president of the United States (2017–2021) (post-primary)

U.S. senators

- Deb Fischer, U.S. senator from Nebraska (2013–present)
- Pete Ricketts, U.S. senator from Nebraska (2023–present)

U.S. representatives

- Mike Johnson, speaker of the United States House of Representatives (2023–present) and LA-04 (2017–present)

State officials

- Bob Evnen, Nebraska secretary of state (2019–present)
- Jim Pillen, governor of Nebraska (2023–present)

State legislators

- 26 state senators

Local officials

- Jean Stothert, mayor of Omaha

Individuals

- Ann Ashford, Democratic primary candidate for this district in 2020 and wife of former U.S. Representative Brad Ashford (Democratic)

Organizations

- AIPAC
- BIPAC
- National Republican Congressional Committee
- National Rifle Association Political Victory Fund
- National Right to Life Committee
- Pro-Israel America
- Republican Jewish Coalition
- U.S. Chamber of Commerce (post-primary)
- With Honor Fund

Labor unions

- Association of Flight Attendants
- Omaha Police Officers Association
Dan Frei

Political parties

- Nebraska Republican Party

==== Fundraising ====
Campaign finance reports as of April 24, 2024
Candidate	Raised	Spent	Cash on hand
Don Bacon (R)	$3,465,982	$1,929,712	$1,727,525
Dan Frei (R)	$125,759	$84,491	$41,268
Source: Federal Election Commission

==== Results ====
Republican primary results
Party	Candidate	Votes	%
Republican	Don Bacon (incumbent)	35,748	61.96%
Republican	Dan Frei	21,946	38.04%
Total votes		57,694	100.00%

=== Democratic primary ===
==== Nominee ====
- Tony Vargas, state senator and nominee for this district in 2022

==== Endorsements ====
Tony Vargas

Statewide officials

- Gretchen Whitmer, governor of Michigan (2019–present)

Organizations

- CHC BOLD PAC
- DCCC Red to Blue
- Democratic Majority for Israel
- End Citizens United
- Everytown for Gun Safety
- J Street PAC
- Jewish Democratic Council of America
- Latino Victory Fund
- League of Conservation Voters
- NewDem Action Fund
- Planned Parenthood Action Fund
- Reproductive Freedom for All
- Sierra Club
- Swing Left

Labor unions

- United Auto Workers

==== Fundraising ====
Campaign finance reports as of April 24, 2024
Candidate	Raised	Spent	Cash on hand
Tony Vargas (D)	$2,407,207	$819,341	$1,641,255
Source: Federal Election Commission

==== Results ====
Democratic primary results
Party	Candidate	Votes	%
Democratic	Tony Vargas	39,038	100.00%
Total votes		39,038	100.00%

=== Independents ===
==== Declined ====
- Megan Hunt, state senator

=== General election ===
==== Debates and forums ====
2024 Nebraska 2nd congressional district debates and forums
No.	Date	Host	Moderator	Link	Participants	
P Participant A Absent N Non-invitee I Invitee W Withdrawn						
P Participant A Absent N Non-invitee I Invitee W Withdrawn					Bacon	Vargas
1	October 4, 2024	WOWT	Brian Mastre		P	P
2	October 8, 2024	Nebraska Public Media	Aaron Sanderford		P	P
3	October 13, 2024	KETV	Rob McCartney		P	P

==== Predictions ====
Source	Ranking	As of
The Cook Political Report	Lean D (flip)	November 1, 2024
Inside Elections	Tilt D (flip)	October 10, 2024
Sabato's Crystal Ball	Lean D (flip)	September 30, 2024
Elections Daily	Lean D (flip)	October 10, 2024
CNalysis	Tilt D (flip)	October 7, 2024
Roll Call	Tilt D (flip)	October 15, 2024
Fox News	Tossup	September 25, 2024
DDHQ	Lean D (flip)	November 4, 2024
FiveThirtyEight	Lean D (flip)	October 8, 2024
The Economist	Lean D (flip)	October 10, 2024

==== Polling ====
Aggregate polls

Source of poll aggregation	Dates administered	Dates updated	Don Bacon (R)	Tony Vargas (D)	Undecided (Note: Calculated by taking the difference of 100% and all other candidates combined.)	Margin
The Hill/DDHQ	through October 28, 2024	October 30, 2024	44.9%	50.2%	4.9%	Vargas +5.3%

Poll source	Date(s) administered	Sample size	Margin of error	Don Bacon (R)	Tony Vargas (D)	Other	Undecided
YouGov	October 21–28, 2024	389 (LV)	± 6.2%	46%	50%	1%	3%
The New York Times/Siena College	September 24–26, 2024	663 (LV)	± 4.1%	46%	49%	–	6%
The New York Times/Siena College	September 24–26, 2024	663 (RV)	± 4.0%	44%	48%	–	8%
CNN/SSRS	September 20–25, 2024	749 (RV)	± 4.0%	44%	50%	6% (Note: "Neither" with 4%; "Other" with 2%)	–
September 19–23, 2024	Republican efforts to move Nebraska to a winner-take-all electoral vote system for President						
Change Research (D) (Note: Poll sponsored by Future Majority PAC, a Democratic group)	September 16–23, 2024	548 (LV)	–	41%	49%	–	10%
Global Strategy Group (D) (Note: Poll sponsored by Vargas's campaign)	September 9–13, 2024	600 (LV)	± 4.4%	45%	49%	–	6%
SurveyUSA (Note: Poll sponsored by Split Ticket)	August 23–27, 2024	507 (RV)	± 5.6%	40%	46%	–	14%
Change Research (D)	August 10–17, 2024	2,429 (V)	± 2.2%	43%	48%	–	9%
Remington Research Group (R)	August 14–17, 2024	656 (LV)	± 3.8%	46%	44%	–	10%
GQR (D) (Note: Poll sponsored by House Majority PAC, a Democratic group)	July 16–21, 2024	400 (LV)	–	45%	49%	–	6%
July 21, 2024	Joe Biden withdraws from the presidential race						
Torchlight Strategies (R) (Note: Poll sponsored by the campaign of U.S. Senator Deb Fischer, who has endorsed Bacon)	July 8–11, 2024	300 (LV)	± 6.3%	46%	43%	–	11%
Global Strategy Group (D)	June 25–30, 2024	700 (LV)	± 4.4%	44%	46%	–	9%
Global Strategy Group (D)	February 20–25, 2024	500 (A)	± 4.4%	43%	46%	–	11%

==== Fundraising ====
Campaign finance reports as of September 30, 2024
Candidate	Raised	Spent	Cash on hand
Don Bacon (R)	$5,630,302	$3,638,458	$2,006,079
Tony Vargas (D)	$6,189,421	$4,718,757	$1,524,052
Source: Federal Election Commission

==== Results ====
2024 Nebraska's 2nd congressional district election
Party	Candidate	Votes	%
Republican	Don Bacon (incumbent)	160,198	50.93%
Democratic	Tony Vargas	154,369	49.07%
Total votes		314,567	100.00%
Republican hold			

== District 3 ==
2024 Nebraska's 3rd congressional district election
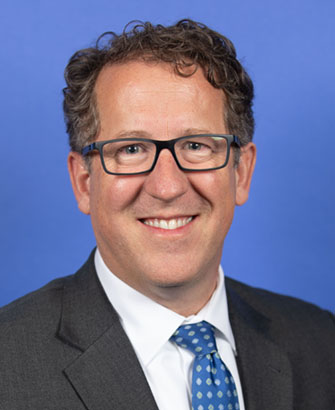

Nominee	Adrian Smith	Daniel Ebers
Party	Republican	Democratic
Popular vote	243,481	59,287
Percentage	80.42%	19.58%
- Smith: 50–60% 60–70% 70–80% 80–90% >90% Ebers: 80–90%
U.S. Representative before election
Adrian Smith
Republican
Elected U.S. Representative
Adrian Smith
Republican

The 3rd district covers most of the rural central and western part of the state, and includes Grand Island, Kearney, Hastings, North Platte, Alliance, and Scottsbluff. The incumbent was Republican Adrian Smith, who was re-elected with 78.3% of the vote in 2022.

=== Republican primary ===
==== Nominee ====
- Adrian Smith, incumbent U.S. representative

==== Eliminated in primary ====
- Robert McCuiston, former mayor of Tamora
- John Walz, mechanical engineer

==== Endorsements ====
Adrian Smith

Organizations

- AIPAC
- National Rifle Association Political Victory Fund
- National Right to Life Committee
- Nebraska Farm Bureau
John Walz

Political parties

- Nebraska Republican Party

==== Fundraising ====
Campaign finance reports as of April 24, 2024
Candidate	Raised	Spent	Cash on hand
Adrian Smith (R)	$1,236,502	$945,970	$1,205,069
John Walz (R)	$19,932	$18,380	$1,570
Source: Federal Election Commission

==== Results ====
Primary results by county: Smith: 50–60%; 60–70%; 70–80%; 80–90%

Republican primary results
Party	Candidate	Votes	%
Republican	Adrian Smith (incumbent)	68,056	74.16%
Republican	John Walz	17,060	18.59%
Republican	Robert McCuiston	6,654	7.25%
Total votes		91,770	100.00%

=== Democratic primary ===
==== Nominee ====
- Daniel Ebers, hotel manager

==== Eliminated in primary ====
- David Else, farmer and nominee for this district in 2022

==== Fundraising ====
Campaign finance reports as of April 24, 2024
Candidate	Raised	Spent	Cash on hand
David Else (D)	$0	$0	$0
Source: Federal Election Commission

==== Results ====
Primary results by county: Ebers: 50–60%; 60–70%; 70–80%; Else: 50–60%; 60–70%; 70–80%; Tie

Democratic primary results
Party	Candidate	Votes	%
Democratic	Daniel Ebers	7,841	52.90%
Democratic	David Else	6,982	47.10%
Total votes		14,823	100.00%

=== General election ===
==== Predictions ====
Source	Ranking	As of
The Cook Political Report	Solid R	April 29, 2024
Inside Elections	Solid R	March 10, 2023
Sabato's Crystal Ball	Safe R	February 23, 2023
Elections Daily	Safe R	October 5, 2023
CNalysis	Solid R	November 16, 2023

==== Polling ====
Poll source	Date(s) administered	Sample size	Margin of error	Adrian Smith (R)	Daniel Ebers (D)	Other	Undecided
YouGov	October 21–28, 2024	404 (LV)	–	68%	22%	2% (Note: "Someone else" with 2%)	8%

==== Results ====
2024 Nebraska's 3rd congressional district election
Party	Candidate	Votes	%
Republican	Adrian Smith (incumbent)	243,481	80.42%
Democratic	Daniel Ebers	59,287	19.58%
Total votes		302,768	100.00%
Republican hold			

== See also ==
- 2024 Nebraska elections

== Notes ==
Partisan clients
