= 2024 United States presidential election in Nebraska =

- November 5, 2024
- Turnout: 76.39% (▲0.06 pp)

Nominee	Donald Trump	Kamala Harris
Party	Republican	Democratic
Home state	Florida	California
Running mate	JD Vance	Tim Walz
Electoral vote	4	1
Popular vote	564,816	369,995
Percentage	59.32%	38.86%

Trump
40–50%
50–60%
60–70%
70–80%
80–90%
90–100%
Harris
40–50%
50–60%
60–70%
70–80%
80–90%
90–100%
Tie
President before election
Joe Biden
Democratic
Elected President
Donald Trump
Republican

The 2024 United States presidential election in Nebraska took place on Tuesday, November 5, 2024, as part of the 2024 United States presidential election in which all 50 states and the District of Columbia participated. Nebraska voters chose electors to represent them in the Electoral College via a popular vote. Nebraska has five electoral votes.

Nebraska is one of two states — the other being Maine — that allocates their electoral votes separately by congressional district in addition to two electoral votes going to the statewide winner. The 2nd congressional district, which contains Omaha and some of its suburbs, has been competitive since 2008, when Obama narrowly won the district, making it the first time in 44 years that a Democrat won any of the state's electoral votes. In recent years, the district has leaned Democratic. In 2020, the district flipped back to the Democratic column, backing Joe Biden by 5.9%, despite the state voting Republican by a landslide margin.

Trump improved his margin statewide but lost the 2nd district again. This is the first time the 2nd district voted for a Democratic nominee who lost the popular vote and the presidential election. Barack Obama in 2012 and Hillary Clinton in 2016 both failed to carry the district, even as both won the popular vote. The 2nd district was the only electoral vote Trump won in 2016 that he did not win in 2024. While redistricting between the 2020 and 2024 elections had made the district more Republican-leaning, Kamala Harris carried it by 4.6%.

Nebraska had one of the smallest swings of any state, swinging by just 1.3% from 2020 to 2024, to a 20.46% margin. Tim Walz, the running mate of Kamala Harris and governor of Minnesota, was born and raised in the state.

== Primary elections ==
=== Democratic primary ===
The Nebraska Democratic primary was held on May 14, 2024. President Biden won twenty-eight delegates. Congressman Dean Phillips won one delegate by receiving the most votes of any candidate in Logan County, with 55.6% of the vote.

Nebraska Democratic primary, May 14, 2024
Candidate	Votes	%	Delegates
Joe Biden (incumbent)	84,677	90.20	28
Dean Phillips (withdrawn)	9,199	9.80	1
Total	93,876	100%	29

=== Republican primary ===
The Nebraska Republican primary was held on May 14, 2024.

Nebraska Republican primary, May 14, 2024
Candidate	Votes	Percentage	Actual delegate count		
Candidate	Votes	Percentage	Bound	Unbound	Total
Donald Trump	167,968	79.94%	36		36
Nikki Haley (withdrawn)	38,246	18.20%			
Perry Johnson (withdrawn)	3,902	1.86%			
Total:	211,787	100.00%	36		36

=== Libertarian primary ===
Primary results by county: Oliver: 20–30%; 30–40%; 40–50%; 50–60%; 60–70%; 70–80%; >90%; Ballay: 20–30%; 30–40%; 40–50%; 60–70%; >90%; Hornberger: 50–60%; 60–70%; Mapstead: 30–40%; 50–60%; >90%; Rectenwald: 40–50%; Tie: 20–30%; 30–40%; 40–50%; 50–60%; No Votes

The Nebraska Libertarian primary was held on May 14, 2024. Six candidates were on the ballot.

Nebraska Libertarian primary, May 14, 2024
Candidate	Votes	Percentage
Chase Oliver	309	27.6%
Charles Ballay	237	21.2%
Jacob Hornberger	204	18.2%
Lars Mapstead	180	16.1%
Michael Rectenwald	120	10.7%
Mike ter Maat	69	6.2%
Total:	1,119	100.0%

== General election ==
=== Candidates ===
The following presidential candidates have received ballot access in Nebraska:

- Kamala Harris, Democratic Party
- Donald Trump, Republican Party
- Chase Oliver, Libertarian Party
- Jill Stein, Green Party
- Cornel West, Independent

In addition, Robert F. Kennedy Jr. successfully made it on the ballot, but took his name off of it when he withdrew.

=== Proposal to change to electoral vote system ===
In April 2024, there was a failed push from some Republicans to replace the split Electoral College voting with a winner-takes-all system. The change was prompted by a possible scenario where if Joe Biden carried the blue wall states of Wisconsin, Michigan, and Pennsylvania but no other swing states, the second district could give Biden the decisive 270th electoral vote. While Republicans control the state legislature, the attempt failed due to internal opposition. Only eight legislators voted to advance the proposal when it was brought forward at the end of the legislative session. Republican Senator Mike McDonnell, who had given the caucus a filibuster-proof majority when he switched his affiliation from Democratic, stated, "I am not voting for cloture on winner-take-all, and I am not supporting winner-take-all."

Governor Jim Pillen said he would call a special session to adopt a winner-take-all system if it were to get the necessary support for passage. As bills in Nebraska normally take effect three months after being signed, it would need to be passed with an emergency clause and the support of two-thirds of 49 senators – meaning all 33 Republicans – to be effective for the election. Maureen Terry, a Democratic leader in Maine, responded to the efforts by signaling that if they were successful, the Maine legislature would also adopt a winner-take-all system to negate any benefit given to Republicans.

After Kamala Harris replaced Biden as the Democratic presidential candidate, a second push to change to a winner-take-all system began in September after Republican nominee Donald Trump and several of his allies spoke to Republican legislators and Pillen about instituting the change. Pillen stated he would call a special session for the change if supporters could give him commitments from the 33 legislators needed to overcome a Democratic filibuster; at the time, three of the 33 Republicans in the legislature, including McDonnell, who was expected to be the last holdout, had not committed to supporting the change. Due to restrictions in Maine law, Maine would not have been able to counter such a modification in time for the November election, meaning the change would almost certainly have secured an extra Republican electoral vote. McDonnell stated on September 23 that he would not vote to change the system before the election, preferring that the issue be decided by the state's voters. The following day, Pillen stated he would not call a special session.

=== Predictions ===
Source	1st district	2nd district	3rd district	Statewide	As of
Cook Political Report	Solid R	Likely D	Solid R	Solid R	November 1, 2024
Sabato's Crystal Ball	Likely R	Likely D	Solid R	Safe R	November 4, 2024
Decision Desk HQ/The Hill	Solid R	Likely D	Solid R	Safe R	August 26, 2024
CNalysis	Solid R	Solid D	Solid R	Solid R	November 4, 2024
CNN	Solid R	Lean D	Solid R	Solid R	October 1, 2024
The Economist	Safe R	Likely D	Solid R	Safe R	October 3, 2024
538	Solid R	Likely D	Solid R	Solid R	September 13, 2024
Inside Elections	Solid R	Lean D	Solid R	Solid R	August 29, 2024
NBC News	Safe R	Lean D	Safe R	Safe R	October 6, 2024
YouGov	Safe R	Tossup	Safe R	Safe R	October 16, 2024
Split Ticket	Solid R	Likely D	Solid R	Solid R	November 1, 2024

=== Polling ===
Statewide

Poll source	Date(s) administered	Sample size (Note: Key: A – all adults RV – registered voters LV – likely voters V – unclear)	Margin of error	Donald Trump Republican	Kamala Harris Democratic	Other / Undecided
Change Research (D) (Note: Poll sponsored by the campaign of Dan Osborn, an independent candidate for Nebraska's Class 1 Senate seat)	October 30–31, 2024	600 (LV)	± 4.3%	57%	39%	4%
Torchlight Strategies (R) (Note: Poll sponsored by the campaign of U.S. Senator Deb Fischer, who has endorsed Trump)	October 25–28, 2024	605 (LV)	± 3.9%	56%	39%	5%
New York Times/Siena College	October 23−26, 2024	1,194 (RV)	± 3.2%	55%	40%	5%
New York Times/Siena College	October 23−26, 2024	1,194 (LV)	± 3.2%	55%	40%	5%
Change Research (D)	October 18–21, 2024	815 (LV)	–	55%	41%	4%
Torchlight Strategies (R)	October 5–8, 2024	600 (LV)	± 4.9%	57%	37%	6%
Change Research (D)	October 3–8, 2024	895 (LV)	± 3.5%	58%	38%	4%
Impact Research (D)	October 1–3, 2024	600 (LV)	± 4.0%	58%	38%	4%
The Bullfinch Group (Note: Poll conducted for The Independent Center)	September 27 – October 1, 2024	400 (LV)	± 4.9%	53%	42%	5%
The Bullfinch Group	September 27 – October 1, 2024	400 (LV)	± 4.9%	48%	38%	14% (Note: "A third party / Independent candidate" with 7%)
SurveyUSA	September 20–23, 2024	558 (LV)	± 4.8%	56%	40%	5% (Note: "Other" with 3%; "Undecided" with 2%)
Global Strategy Group (D) (Note: Poll sponsored by Retire Career Politicians PAC)	August 26–29, 2024	600 (LV)	–	54%	37%	9%
SurveyUSA (Note: Poll commissioned by Split Ticket)	August 23–27, 2024	1,293 (RV)	± 3.5%	54%	37%	9% (Note: "Other" with 4%)

Poll source	Date(s) administered	Sample size	Margin of error	Donald Trump Republican	Kamala Harris Democratic	Cornel West Independent	Jill Stein Green	Chase Oliver Libertarian	Other / Undecided
The Economist/YouGov	October 21–28, 2024	1,206 (LV)	± 3.5%	55%	40%	0%	0%	1%	4% (Note: "Other" with 1%)
New York Times/Siena College	October 23−26, 2024	1,194 (RV)	± 3.2%	53%	38%	0%	0%	1%	8%
New York Times/Siena College	October 23−26, 2024	1,194 (LV)	± 3.2%	53%	39%	0%	0%	1%	7%

Hypothetical polling with Donald Trump and Joe Biden

Donald Trump vs. Joe Biden

Poll source	Date(s) administered	Sample size	Margin of error	Donald Trump Republican	Joe Biden Democratic	Other / Undecided
Torchlight Strategies (R)	July 8–11, 2024	698 (LV)	± 3.7%	52%	33%	15% (Note: "Someone else" with 11%)
Public Policy Polling (D)	April 24–25, 2024	737 (V)	± 3.6%	57%	34%	9%
John Zogby Strategies (Note: Poll conducted for Kennedy's campaign)	April 13–21, 2024	307 (LV)	–	50%	39%	11%
Change Research (D) (Note: Poll sponsored by Nebraska Railroaders for Public Safety)	November 13–16, 2023	1,048 (LV)	–	53%	35%	12%
Emerson College	October 1–4, 2023	423 (RV)	± 4.7%	47%	31%	23%

Hypothetical polling with other candidates

Donald Trump vs. Robert F. Kennedy Jr.

Poll source	Date(s) administered	Sample size	Margin of error	Donald Trump Republican	Robert Kennedy Jr. Independent	Other / Undecided
John Zogby Strategies	April 13–21, 2024	307 (LV)	–	47%	39%	14%

Robert F. Kennedy Jr. vs. Joe Biden

Poll source	Date(s) administered	Sample size	Margin of error	Robert Kennedy Jr. Independent	Joe Biden Democratic	Other / Undecided
John Zogby Strategies	April 13–21, 2024	307 (LV)	–	50%	38%	12%

1st congressional district

Donald Trump vs. Kamala Harris vs.Cornel West vs. Jill Stein vs. Chase Oliver

Poll source	Date(s) administered	Sample size	Margin of error	Donald Trump Republican	Kamala Harris Democratic	Cornel West Independent	Jill Stein Green	Chase Oliver Libertarian	Other / Undecided
The Economist/YouGov	October 21–28, 2024	408 (LV)	–	51%	43%	0%	0%	3%	3%

2nd congressional district

Poll source	Date(s) administered	Sample size	Margin of error	Kamala Harris Democratic	Donald Trump Republican	Other / Undecided
New York Times/Siena College	October 23−26, 2024	500 (LV)	± 4.8%	54%	42%	4%
New York Times/Siena College	September 24–26, 2024	680 (RV)	± 4.0%	51%	42%	7%
New York Times/Siena College	September 24–26, 2024	680 (LV)	± 4.0%	52%	43%	5%
SurveyUSA	August 23–27, 2024	507 (RV)	± 5.6%	47%	42%	11% (Note: "Other" with 5%)

Poll source	Date(s) administered	Sample size	Margin of error	Kamala Harris Democratic	Donald Trump Republican	Cornel West Independent	Jill Stein Green	Chase Oliver Libertarian	Other / Undecided
The Economist/YouGov	October 21–28, 2024	393 (LV)	–	52%	44%	0%	1%	1%	2%
New York Times/Siena College	October 23−26, 2024	500 (LV)	± 4.8%	53%	41%	0%	0%	1%	5%
New York Times/Siena College	September 24–26, 2024	680 (RV)	± 4.0%	49%	41%	–	2%	2%	6%
New York Times/Siena College	September 24–26, 2024	680 (LV)	± 4.0%	51%	42%	–	2%	1%	4%
CNN/SSRS	September 20–25, 2024	794 (LV)	± 4.0%	53%	42%	1%	1%	1%	2%

Hypothetical polling with Robert F. Kennedy Jr.

Kamala Harris vs. Donald Trump vs. Robert F. Kennedy Jr. vs. Chase Oliver vs. Cornel West vs. Jill Stein

Poll source	Date(s) administered	Sample size	Margin of error	Kamala Harris Democratic	Donald Trump Republican	Robert F. Kennedy Jr. Independent	Chase Oliver Libertarian	Cornel West Independent	Jill Stein Green	Other / Undecided
Remington Research Group (R) (Note: Poll sponsored by Nebraska Examiner)	August 14–17, 2024	656 (LV)	± 3.8%	50%	42%	2%	1%	1%	0%	4%

Kamala Harris vs. Donald Trump vs. Robert F. Kennedy Jr.

Poll source	Date(s) administered	Sample size	Margin of error	Kamala Harris Democratic	Donald Trump Republican	Robert F. Kennedy Jr. Independent	Other / Undecided
Change Research (D) (Note: Poll sponsored by Future Majority)	August 10–17, 2024	437 (LV)	–	47%	42%	5%	6%

Hypothetical polling with Joe Biden and Donald Trump

Joe Biden vs. Donald Trump

Poll source	Date(s) administered	Sample size	Margin of error	Joe Biden Democratic	Donald Trump Republican	Other / Undecided
Torchlight Strategies (R)	July 8–11, 2024	300 (LV)	–	42%	42%	16% (Note: "Someone else" with 12%)
Public Policy Polling (D)	April 24–25, 2024	–	–	43%	46%	11%

Joe Biden vs. Donald Trump vs. Robert F. Kennedy Jr. vs. Cornel West vs. Jill Stein

Poll source	Date(s) administered	Sample size	Margin of error	Joe Biden Democratic	Donald Trump Republican	Robert F. Kennedy Jr. Independent	Cornel West Independent	Jill Stein Green	Other / Undecided
Public Policy Polling (D)	April 24–25, 2024	–	–	34%	37%	9%	4%	4%	12%

Joe Biden vs. Donald Trump vs. Robert F. Kennedy Jr.

Poll source	Date(s) administered	Sample size	Margin of error	Joe Biden Democratic	Donald Trump Republican	Robert F. Kennedy Jr. Independent	Other / Undecided
Iron Light Intelligence (Note: Poll commissioned by League of American Workers)	May 17–22, 2024	400 (LV)	± 5.0%	42%	37%	13%	8%

3rd congressional district

Donald Trump vs. Kamala Harris vs.Cornel West vs. Jill Stein vs. Chase Oliver

Poll source	Date(s) administered	Sample size	Margin of error	Donald Trump Republican	Kamala Harris Democratic	Cornel West Independent	Jill Stein Green	Chase Oliver Libertarian	Other / Undecided
The Economist/YouGov	October 21–28, 2024	404 (LV)	–	70%	25%	0%	0%	0%	5%

=== Results ===
State Legislature district results: Trump 50–60% 60–70% 70–80% 80–90% / Harris 50–60% 60–70% 70–80% 80–90%

2024 United States presidential election in Nebraska
Party	Candidate	Votes	%	±%
Republican	Donald Trump; JD Vance	564,816	59.32%	+1.10%
Democratic	Kamala Harris; Tim Walz	369,995	38.86%	−0.31%
Libertarian	Chase Oliver; Mike ter Maat	6,399	0.67%	−1.45%
Legal Marijuana Now	Cornel West; Melina Abdullah	3,062	0.32%	N/A
Green	Jill Stein (Note: Listed on the ballot without party affiliation.); Samson Kpadenou (Note: Replacement for Butch Ware, Stein's vice presidential nominee.)	2,887	0.30%	N/A
Write-in		5,023	0.53%	+0.04%
Total votes		952,182	100.00%	N/A

==== By county ====
County	Donald Trump Republican		Kamala Harris Democratic		Various candidates Other parties		Margin		Total
County	#	%	#	%	#	%	#	%	Total
Adams	10,077	69.92%	4,100	28.45%	235	1.63%	5,977	41.47%	14,412
Antelope	3,032	87.68%	396	11.45%	30	0.87%	2,636	76.23%	3,458
Arthur	264	93.29%	17	6.01%	2	0.71%	247	87.28%	283
Banner	348	89.23%	34	8.72%	8	2.05%	314	80.51%	390
Blaine	250	85.62%	37	12.67%	5	1.71%	213	72.95%	292
Boone	2,499	82.20%	496	16.32%	45	1.48%	2,003	65.88%	3,040
Box Butte	3,827	77.52%	1,043	21.13%	67	1.36%	2,784	56.39%	4,937
Boyd	938	87.17%	132	12.27%	6	0.56%	806	74.90%	1,076
Brown	1,428	86.65%	201	12.20%	19	1.15%	1,227	74.45%	1,648
Buffalo	17,064	71.47%	6,386	26.75%	427	1.79%	10,678	44.72%	23,877
Burt	2,632	71.81%	983	26.82%	50	1.36%	1,649	44.99%	3,665
Butler	3,642	79.05%	906	19.67%	59	1.28%	2,736	59.38%	4,607
Cass	10,685	67.50%	4,824	30.47%	321	2.03%	5,861	37.03%	15,830
Cedar	4,141	83.86%	702	14.22%	95	1.92%	3,439	69.64%	4,938
Chase	1,648	88.22%	204	10.92%	16	0.86%	1,444	77.30%	1,868
Cherry	2,687	87.30%	349	11.34%	42	1.36%	2,338	75.96%	3,078
Cheyenne	3,692	81.11%	787	17.29%	73	1.60%	2,905	63.82%	4,552
Clay	2,677	80.66%	577	17.38%	65	1.96%	2,100	63.28%	3,319
Colfax	2,636	74.91%	845	24.01%	38	1.08%	1,791	50.90%	3,519
Cuming	3,536	79.34%	867	19.45%	54	1.21%	2,669	59.89%	4,457
Custer	5,042	85.33%	786	13.30%	81	1.37%	4,256	72.03%	5,909
Dakota	3,934	64.09%	2,109	34.36%	95	1.55%	1,825	29.73%	6,138
Dawes	2,812	72.31%	992	25.51%	85	2.19%	1,820	46.80%	3,889
Dawson	6,312	74.07%	2,101	24.65%	109	1.28%	4,211	49.42%	8,522
Deuel	843	83.14%	151	14.89%	20	1.97%	692	68.25%	1,014
Dixon	2,271	78.20%	573	19.73%	60	2.07%	1,698	58.47%	2,904
Dodge	10,795	65.39%	5,434	32.92%	279	1.69%	5,361	32.47%	16,508
Douglas	120,919	43.95%	148,733	54.06%	5,493	2.00%	-27,814	-10.11%	275,145
Dundy	829	89.04%	96	10.31%	6	0.64%	733	78.73%	931
Fillmore	2,315	76.55%	662	21.89%	47	1.55%	1,653	54.66%	3,024
Franklin	1,351	84.17%	236	14.70%	18	1.12%	1,115	69.47%	1,605
Frontier	1,213	85.85%	185	13.09%	15	1.06%	1,028	72.76%	1,413
Furnas	2,043	84.46%	358	14.80%	18	0.74%	1,685	69.66%	2,419
Gage	7,523	68.61%	3,242	29.57%	200	1.82%	4,281	39.04%	10,965
Garden	949	84.73%	162	14.46%	9	0.80%	787	70.27%	1,120
Garfield	893	87.81%	116	11.41%	8	0.79%	777	76.40%	1,017
Gosper	907	80.77%	203	18.08%	13	1.16%	704	62.69%	1,123
Grant	351	95.90%	15	4.10%	0	0.00%	336	91.80%	366
Greeley	1,030	83.40%	192	15.55%	13	1.05%	838	67.85%	1,235
Hall	15,566	67.97%	6,956	30.37%	379	1.65%	8,610	37.60%	22,901
Hamilton	4,416	79.24%	1,067	19.15%	90	1.61%	3,349	60.09%	5,573
Harlan	1,506	83.43%	280	15.51%	19	1.05%	1,226	67.92%	1,805
Hayes	472	95.55%	19	3.85%	3	0.61%	453	91.70%	494
Hitchcock	1,269	88.19%	152	10.56%	18	1.25%	1,117	77.63%	1,439
Holt	4,708	86.26%	681	12.48%	69	1.26%	4,027	73.78%	5,458
Hooker	369	86.42%	55	12.88%	3	0.70%	314	73.54%	427
Howard	2,868	80.43%	642	18.00%	56	1.57%	2,226	62.43%	3,566
Jefferson	2,614	71.83%	968	26.60%	57	1.57%	1,646	45.23%	3,639
Johnson	1,496	69.16%	625	28.90%	42	1.94%	871	40.26%	2,163
Kearney	2,828	78.23%	736	20.36%	51	1.41%	2,092	57.87%	3,615
Keith	3,416	81.16%	731	17.37%	62	1.47%	2,685	63.79%	4,209
Keya Paha	500	91.74%	44	8.07%	1	0.18%	456	83.67%	545
Kimball	1,424	82.69%	272	15.80%	26	1.51%	1,152	66.89%	1,722
Knox	3,593	80.78%	786	17.67%	69	1.55%	2,807	63.11%	4,448
Lancaster	74,215	46.75%	81,012	51.04%	3,507	2.21%	-6,797	-4.29%	158,734
Lincoln	12,674	76.67%	3,586	21.69%	270	1.63%	9,088	54.98%	16,530
Logan	409	92.53%	25	5.66%	8	1.81%	384	86.87%	442
Loup	354	82.71%	73	17.06%	1	0.23%	281	65.65%	428
Madison	12,145	77.13%	3,360	21.34%	242	1.54%	8,785	55.79%	15,747
McPherson	267	94.01%	12	4.23%	5	1.76%	255	89.78%	284
Merrick	3,551	81.30%	730	16.71%	87	1.99%	2,821	64.59%	4,368
Morrill	2,026	83.37%	366	15.06%	38	1.56%	1,660	68.31%	2,430
Nance	1,462	79.28%	352	19.09%	30	1.63%	1,110	60.19%	1,844
Nemaha	2,443	71.04%	915	26.61%	81	2.36%	1,528	44.43%	3,439
Nuckolls	1,836	81.17%	399	17.64%	27	1.19%	1,437	63.53%	2,262
Otoe	5,651	68.69%	2,463	29.94%	113	1.37%	3,188	38.75%	8,227
Pawnee	1,085	78.34%	284	20.51%	16	1.16%	801	57.83%	1,385
Perkins	1,224	85.47%	187	13.06%	21	1.47%	1,037	72.41%	1,432
Phelps	4,158	83.39%	758	15.20%	70	1.40%	3,400	68.19%	4,986
Pierce	3,420	87.47%	446	11.41%	44	1.13%	2,974	76.06%	3,910
Platte	12,326	78.33%	3,191	20.28%	219	1.39%	9,135	58.05%	15,736
Polk	2,296	81.16%	501	17.71%	32	1.13%	1,795	63.45%	2,829
Red Willow	4,457	83.48%	815	15.27%	67	1.25%	3,642	68.21%	5,339
Richardson	2,962	74.76%	934	23.57%	66	1.67%	2,028	51.19%	3,962
Rock	745	89.22%	85	10.18%	5	0.60%	660	79.04%	835
Saline	3,734	65.84%	1,855	32.71%	82	1.45%	1,879	33.13%	5,671
Sarpy	55,567	54.85%	43,825	43.26%	1,907	1.88%	11,742	11.59%	101,299
Saunders	9,854	72.34%	3,558	26.12%	210	1.54%	6,296	46.22%	13,622
Scotts Bluff	11,033	73.09%	3,856	25.54%	206	1.36%	7,177	47.55%	15,095
Seward	6,667	72.15%	2,388	25.84%	185	2.00%	4,279	46.31%	9,240
Sheridan	2,102	84.18%	362	14.50%	33	1.32%	1,740	69.68%	2,497
Sherman	1,344	79.43%	328	19.39%	20	1.18%	1,016	60.04%	1,692
Sioux	597	87.79%	77	11.32%	6	0.88%	520	76.47%	680
Stanton	2,536	82.44%	492	15.99%	48	1.56%	2,044	66.45%	3,076
Thayer	2,278	79.57%	544	19.00%	41	1.43%	1,734	60.57%	2,863
Thomas	348	88.55%	44	11.20%	1	0.25%	304	77.35%	393
Thurston	1,125	52.99%	978	46.07%	20	0.94%	147	6.92%	2,123
Valley	1,872	81.36%	403	17.51%	26	1.13%	1,469	63.85%	2,301
Washington	8,855	70.24%	3,538	28.06%	214	1.70%	5,317	42.18%	12,607
Wayne	3,011	73.33%	1,006	24.50%	89	2.17%	2,005	48.83%	4,106
Webster	1,449	82.10%	296	16.77%	20	1.13%	1,153	65.33%	1,765
Wheeler	424	87.24%	57	11.73%	5	1.03%	367	75.51%	486
York	5,234	74.56%	1,648	23.48%	138	1.97%	3,586	51.08%	7,020
Totals	564,816	59.32%	369,995	38.86%	17,371	1.82%	194,821	20.46%	952,182

==== By congressional district ====
Trump won two of Nebraska's three congressional districts, while Harris won the second, which elected a Republican.

District	Trump		Harris		Other		Representative
District	#	%	#	%	#	%	Representative
1st	177,666	55.49%	136,153	42.52%	6,375	1.99%	Mike Flood
2nd	148,905	46.73%	163,541	51.32%	6,200	1.95%	Don Bacon
3rd	238,245	76.03%	70,301	22.44%	4,796	1.53%	Adrian Smith

== Analysis ==
A sparsely populated Great Plains state, Nebraska has voted Republican in nearly every presidential election since its statehood, making exceptions only for favorite son William Jennings Bryan; Woodrow Wilson; Franklin D. Roosevelt in his first two terms; and landslide winner Lyndon B. Johnson. Democratic presidential candidates have not been able to come within single digits of carrying the state since Johnson carried the state in his 1964 landslide, and the only Democrat to win more than 40% of the statewide vote since then was Barack Obama, who garnered 41.60% in 2008.

Harris's win in Nebraska's 2nd congressional district marked the first time Democrats carried the district in consecutive elections since Nebraska adopted the district method in 1992, and the first time since 1936 that Democrats won consecutive electoral votes from the state. It was also the first presidential election since 2012 where the district did not back the Electoral College winner, and the first time a Republican won the presidency without carrying the district or sweeping Nebraska’s electoral votes since 1908. Despite Harris's win at the top of the ticket, Republican Don Bacon won re-election to represent the 2nd district in the U.S. House, although by a narrower margin than in 2020 with Biden.

In the 1st and 3rd districts, Harris improved from Biden by earning more raw votes in both. However, her gains in the 3rd district were counterbalanced with similar gains Trump made in the district. Although Trump won the 1st district with 55.49% of its vote, the district shifted towards Harris by 1.96%. With all fifty states plus Washington, D.C. swinging towards Trump, a feat not seen since the 1976 presidential election, this marked the only electoral vote to swing left in 2024. Additionally, the 3rd district shifted towards Trump by 0.58%, marking the smallest rightward swing for any electoral vote in 2024, even surpassing Washington state's 0.98% swing. In Sarpy County, the state's third-largest county that is split between the 1st and 2nd districts, Harris garnered the highest percentage for a Democratic candidate since Johnson's win in 1964.

== Aftermath ==
Following Harris's victory in the 2nd district, Republicans attempted to pass a measure in the Nebraska Legislature to return the state to winner-take-all. However, the measure only received 31 votes in favor to 18 in opposition; 33 votes were needed to overcome the filibuster.

== See also ==
- United States presidential elections in Nebraska
- 2024 Nebraska elections
- 2024 United States elections

== Notes ==
Partisan clients
