= Christian Mirch =

American politician

Member of the Nebraska Public Service Commission from the 2nd district
- Incumbent
- Assumed office January 27, 2023
- Preceded by: Crystal Rhoades

Personal details
- Born: Christian Heyer Mirch; March 30, 1987 (age 39)
- Party: Republican
- Spouse: Emma
- Children: 2
- Education: Creighton University (BS, JD)

Christian Heyer Mirch (born March 30, 1987) is a Republican politician currently serving as a member of the Nebraska Public Service Commission from the 2nd district. He was appointed in 2023 by Governor Jim Pillen to serve out the remaining four-year term following his predecessor's resignation.

== Early career ==
Mirch grew up in Douglas, Wyoming, and graduated from Douglas High School in 2005. He attended Creighton University while working as a police officer for the Omaha Police Department, and graduated in 2011. He later attended the Creighton University School of Law, graduating in 2019, after which he clerked for Justice Michael G. Heavican of the Nebraska Supreme Court. In 2020, Mirch ran for the Papio-Missouri River Natural Resources District as a Director from Subdistrict 3 but lost to Larry Bradley, receiving 43.1% of the vote to Bradley's 56.9%.

In 2022, Mirch ran for the Nebraska Legislature in District 6 against incumbent Senator Machaela Cavanaugh, who affiliated with the Democratic Party, and Elizabeth Hallgren. Mirch placed second in the primary, with 39% of the vote, and advanced to the general election against Cavanaugh, who received 49%. In the general election, Cavanaugh defeated Mirch by a wide margin, winning 56% of the vote to his 44%.

== Nebraska Public Service Commission ==
In 2023, after Public Service Commissioner Crystal Rhoades resigned from the commission upon her election as Douglas County Clerk of the District Court, Governor Jim Pillen appointed Mirch to serve out the final four years of Rhoades's term. Mirch's appointment gave Republicans control of all five seats on the commission.

Several months into Mirch's term, he and fellow Commissioner Kevin Stocker were censured by the commission for an undisclosed personnel issue, which was connected to grievances filed by staffers alleging that they had created a "hostile workplace." Mirch and Stocker issued a joint press release in response to the censure, which they characterized as a "politically motivated attack" by the commission's chairman, Dan Watermeier, which was meant "to distract the media and the public from the commission's repeated failures and dereliction of duty."

Mirch considered seeking a full term in 2026 but ultimately declined to do so.
