= Anne Boyle =

American politician

Member of the Nebraska Public Service Commission from the 2nd district
- In office January 9, 1997 – January 8, 2015
- Preceded by: James F. Munnelly
- Succeeded by: Crystal Rhoades

Chair of the Nebraska Democratic Party
- In office June 27, 1998 – June 1, 2001
- Preceded by: Deb Hardin Quirk
- Succeeded by: Steve Achelpohl

Personal details
- Born: December 22, 1942 Omaha, Nebraska
- Died: February 2, 2019 (aged 76) Omaha, Nebraska
- Party: Democratic
- Spouse: Mike Boyle (m. 1965)

Anne C. Boyle (née Howell, December 22, 1942 – February 2, 2019) was an American Democratic politician from the U.S. state of Nebraska who served as a member of the Nebraska Public Service Commission from 1997 to 2015. Boyle served as the chair of the Nebraska Democratic Party from 1998 to 2001, and in 2010 ran as the Democratic nominee for lieutenant governor.

== Early life ==
Boyle was born in 1942 in Omaha, and was the daughter of longtime County Treasurer Sam J. Howell Jr. She graduated from Cathedral High School in 1961 and later worked at the family's insurance agency, marrying Mike Boyle in 1965. Boyle later worked for U.S. senator J. James Exon's office, served as the chair of the Douglas County Democratic Party from 1972 to 1974, and was the campaign coordinator for Omaha Mayor Edward Zorinsky's successful Senate campaign in 1976.

Mike was elected Mayor of Omaha in 1981 and 1985, and Boyle served as First Lady of the city. When he faced a recall election in 1987, she campaigned for him, but he was ultimately ousted from office.

== Political career ==
In 1991, Boyle ran for the Omaha City Council from District 6. After City Councilman Jim Cleary declined to seek re-election, Liz Barnes, the wife of former U.S. senator David Karnes, emerged as a frontrunner. However, Barnes dropped out of the race several weeks before the primary after she underwent cancer surgery, and Boyle entered the race as a write-in candidate. In the April 2 primary election, Boyle placed second, winning 29 percent of the vote to Lee Terry's 38 percent, and advanced to the general election against him. Terry ultimately defeated Boyle by a wide margin, winning 63 percent of the vote to Boyle's 36 percent.

Following the appointment of State Senator Tim Hall as the state's Deputy Insurance Commissioner in 1995, Boyle considered applying to fill his vacancy, but faced questions as to her residency. However, citing a new business venture, she ultimately declined to apply for the seat.

== Nebraska Public Service Commission ==
In 1996, Public Service Commissioner James Munnelly declined to seek re-election to a sixth term on the commission, and Boyle ran to succeed him in the 2nd district, which was based in metropolitan Omaha. She faced Michael Jacobson, an employee with the County Treasurer's office; Rod Lindwall, a construction company executive; and Gil Steele, a custodian and former firefighter, in the Democratic primary. She won the nomination by a wide margin, receiving 64 percent of the vote. In the general election, she faced Republican Thomas Skutt, an underwriter, and narrowly defeated him, receiving 50 percent of the vote to his 46 percent.

Boyle was elected Chair of the Nebraska Democratic Party in 1998. She stepped down in 2001, citing her official responsibilities and family life.

Following the resignation of Gloria Tristani from the Federal Communications Commission in 2001, Boyle applied to succeed her. Boyle was supported by U.S. senator Ben Nelson and former U.S. senator Bob Kerrey, However, U.S. Senate Minority Leader Tom Daschle ultimately recommended that President George W. Bush nominate Jonathan Adelstein, and Boyle ran for re-election to a second term on the Public Service Commission. Boyle was challenged for re-election by Republican nominee Reid Kenedy, a businessman. Boyle was re-elected by a wider margin, receiving 53 percent of the vote to Kenedy's 47 percent. She was re-elected in 2008 over Metropolitan Utilities District Board member John McCollister, the Republican nominee, in a landslide, receiving 62 percent of the vote to his 33 percent.

In 2010, Democratic gubernatorial nominee Mark Lakers faced a controversy over allegations that he had "fabricated" campaign contributions on his finance reports. Boyle called for the state party to "disavow" his campaign, and Lakers eventually dropped out of the race. Attorney Mike Meister, the party's 2002 nominee for Attorney General, was ultimately named as the replacement gubernatorial nominee, and he selected Boyle as his running mate, saying that she "balances the ticket" and was "ornery." The Meister–Boyle ticket lost the general election to Republican governor Dave Heineman in a landslide, receiving just 26 percent of the vote to Heineman's 74 percent.

Boyle declined to seek re-election to a fourth term in 2014, and was succeeded by Democrat Crystal Rhoades.

== Death ==
Boyle died on February 2, 2019, after she suffered a stroke several days earlier.

Party political offices
Preceded by Steve Loschen	Democratic nominee for Lieutenant Governor of Nebraska; 2010	Succeeded by Jane Raybould
