= Al Veys =

American politician

39th Mayor of Omaha
- In office 1977–1981
- Preceded by: Robert G. Cunningham
- Succeeded by: Mike Boyle

Personal details
- Born: Albert L. Veys; January 10, 1919
- Died: January 8, 2002 (aged 82)
- Party: Democratic
- Spouse: Mary Jean Veys (m. 1981)
- Occupation: Mayor

Albert L. Veys (January 10, 1919 – January 8, 2002) was the 39th mayor of Omaha, Nebraska. He took office on June 6, 1977, after a successful write-in campaign and served until June 8, 1981. He won over council member Betty Abbott by 11,987 votes.

== Tenure as mayor ==
Throughout his tenure as mayor, Veys promoted the use of federal funds to improve Omaha's housing situation. One of his first appointments in office was James Cavanaugh, brother of Representative John Cavanaugh III, to search for available federal funds the city could apply for.

In 1977, Veys supported a plan to apply for US$4,700,000 via the Public Works Act for sewage treatment improvements at the Papillion Creek Sewage Treatment Plant, despite continuing the moratorium on hiring new employees put in place by Mayor Edward Zorinsky. He also proposed an increase to the fee for sewer usage, stating that the failure to do so had caused the Missouri River Treatment Plant to fall into disrepair, resulting in increased pollution.

He supported applying for assistance for residents whose domiciles were flooded in July 1977 when the natural runoff course to Big Papio Creek had been eliminated due to improvements on 82nd Street and the construction of Interstate 80. Prior to the flooding, officials announced that the warning sirens would not be used; Veys had been concerned that people would head to their basements as with a tornado.

When negotiating with the city employees's unions for 1978 pay increases, Omaha offered a 4.1% increase. This was rejected by the unions, with an arbitration court ordering 14.1% for police and 11.1% for firemen. Veys said the city would have difficulty meeting that requirement, and the Nebraska Legislature considered a bill that would require the court to consider a city's ability to pay before making a ruling.

In 1978, he created the Elmwood Park Task Force by appointment to propose improvements to the community.

During the 1979 oil crisis, a comment from Veys resulted in Omaha consumers panic buying gasoline on June 21. Gasoline shipments from Omaha crossed the picket lines established by independent truckers after the statement, though diesel fuel was still restricted.

In May 1980, Veys used an automated telephone call campaign to encourage residents to vote for an extension of Omaha's sales tax in the May 13th election. Veys had told Senator Bernice Labedz that Omaha would be able to lose either the sales tax or the utilities tax that had been approved in 1967. Labedz had proposed legislation to end the utilities tax, which would reduce Omaha's revenue by US$2,100,000.

Mike Boyle defeated Veys in the May 1981 election by 1,592 votes. Veys had been supported by the Nebraska Republican Party because they did not want Boyle to challenge Hal Daub in the election for Nebraska's 2nd congressional district.

=== Commemorative acts ===
On April 21, 1979, Veys presented a key to the city to Spencer W. Kimball at a ceremony in which Kimball announced the end of toll collections on the Mormon Pioneer Memorial Bridge.

On May 9, 1979, Veys declared that May 12 would be observed as "Standing Bear Day" as well as 1979 being observed as "Standing Bear Year."

Veys declared February 15, 1981 "Bob Gibson Day".

== Personal life and death ==
Veys' wife was Mary Jean Veys.

Veys owned a grocery store in south Omaha, and had poor eyesight. He began smoking cigarettes in 1942, and participated in the American Cancer Society's first and third Great American Smokeouts.

In 2002, Veys died two days before his 83rd birthday in Omaha, Nebraska, US.

== Sources ==
- "Bad gas weekend seen for drivers". The Madison Courier. Vol. 143, no. 45. June 22, 1979. p. 12 – via Google Books.
- "Camden, N.J. elects first black mayor". The Lewiston Journal. May 13, 1981. p. 19 – via Google Books.
- "City worker trash pickup considered". Lincoln Star. June 5, 1977. p. 12 – via Internet Archive.
- "Council to decide fate of Omaha sewage plan". Lincoln Star. July 5, 1977. p. 6 – via Internet Archive.
- "Labedz promises to report Omaha flood damage". Lincoln Star. July 30, 1977. p. 6 – via Internet Archive.
- "Mayor's pitch not appreciated". Ellensburg Daily Record. Vol. 79, no. 114. May 13, 1980. p. 9 – via Google Books.
- "No Lighting Up, Please". Altus Times-Democrat. Vol. 55, no. 267. November 14, 1979. p. 9 – via Google Books.
- "Omaha Elects "Write‐in" Mayor". New York Times. May 12, 1977.
- "Omaha mayor gets bread stolen, wants changes in police policies". Lincoln Star. June 25, 1977. p. 5 – via Internet Archive.
- "Omaha sirens will howl only to warn of tornado". Lincoln Star. July 27, 1977. p. 37 – via Internet Archive.
- "Omaha to mark 'Bob Gibson' day". Baltimore Afro-American. Vol. 89, no. 53. February 10, 1981. p. 6 – via Google Books.
- "Omaha tries for public works funds". Lincoln Star. July 7, 1977. p. 8 – via Internet Archive.
- "Public hostile to government workers' unions". Star-News. Vol. 48, no. 25. March 5, 1978. p. 6-A – via Google Books.
- "Truck strike violence mounting; emergency declared in Florida". Record-Journal. Vol. 112, no. 147. June 22, 1979. p. 14 – via Google Books.
- "U.S. major cities". Rulers.org. n.d.
- "Veys' Omaha budget includes sewer fee hike". Lincoln Star. July 20, 1977. p. 13 – via Internet Archive.
- DiSilvestro, Gary (January 13, 1982). "Parks Board delays action on Elmwood Park". The Gateway. Vol. 81, no. 30. p. 10 – via Internet Archive.
- Dustin, Dorothy Devereaux (1980). Omaha & Douglas County: A Panoramic History. Woodland Hills, CA: Windsor Publications. p. 114. ISBN 0-89781-011-2. LCCN 80-52065 – via Internet Archive.
- Holmes, Michael (May 13, 1977). "Is federal money habit forming?". Lincoln Star. p. 9 – via Internet Archive.
- Larsen, Lawrence H.; Cottrell, Barbara J.; Dalstrom, Hal; Dalstrom, Kay Calamé (2007). Upstream Metropolis: An Urban Biography of Omaha and Council Bluffs. Lincoln: University of Nebraska Press. ISBN 978-0-80328-002-1. LCCN 2006051062.
- Pappan, John (June 1, 1979). "Standing Bear Project Report". American Indian Center of Omaha, Inc., Newsletter. Vol. 2, no. 6. p. 7. JSTOR community.38333901.
- Randall, Jim (April 28, 1979). "President Kimball speaks at rites ending tolls on Mormon Bridge". Church News (insert). The Deseret News. Vol. 129, no. 277. p. 4 – via Google Books.
- Stonecipher, Harry W.; Nicholls, Edward C.; Anderson, Douglas A. (1981). Electronic Age News Editing. Chicago: Nelson Hall. ISBN 0-88229-779-1. LCCN 81-536 – via Internet Archive.

Preceded by Robert G. Cunningham	Mayor of Omaha; 1977–1981	Succeeded by Mike Boyle
