= Kevin Stocker (politician) =

American politician

Member of the Nebraska Public Service Commission from the 5th district
- Incumbent
- Assumed office January 5, 2023
- Preceded by: Mary Ridder

Personal details
- Born: November 7, 1960 (age 65) Scottsbluff, Nebraska, U.S.
- Party: Republican
- Spouse: Mary Starkey
- Education: University of Nebraska–Lincoln (BS)

Kevin Stocker (born November 7, 1960) is an American Republican politician and businessman currently serving as a member of the Nebraska Public Service Commission from the 5th district.

== Early life ==
Stocker was born in Scottsbluff, Nebraska, and graduated from Scottsbluff High School in 1979. He then attended the University of Nebraska–Lincoln, graduating with his bachelor's degree in agriscience in 1982.

== Nebraska Public Service Commission ==
Stocker ran for the Public Service Commission in 2022, challenging incumbent Commissioner Mary Ridder in the Republican primary. He self-funded his campaign and significantly outspent Ridder, who had not raised or spent enough to file a state campaign finance report. Stocker ultimately defeated Ridder in a 3 way race by winning 41 percent of the vote. He was unopposed in the general election.

Several months into Stocker's term, he and fellow Commissioner Christian Mirch were censured by the Commission for an undisclosed personnel issue, which was connected to grievances filed by staffers alleging that they had created a "hostile workplace." Stocker and Mirch issued a joint press release in response to the censure, which they characterized as a "politically motivated attack" by the Commission's Chairman, Dan Watermeier, which was meant "to distract the media and the public from the commission's repeated failures and dereliction of duty."
