= 2012 United States presidential election in Nebraska =

- November 6, 2012

Nominee	Mitt Romney	Barack Obama
Party	Republican	Democratic
Home state	Massachusetts	Illinois
Running mate	Paul Ryan	Joe Biden
Electoral vote	5	0
Popular vote	475,064	302,081
Percentage	59.80%	38.03%

Romney
40–50%
50–60%
60–70%
70–80%
80–90%
Obama
50–60%
President before election
Barack Obama
Democratic
Elected President
Barack Obama
Democratic

The 2012 United States presidential election in Nebraska took place on November 6, 2012, as part of the 2012 United States presidential election in which all 50 states plus the District of Columbia participated. Voters chose five electors to represent them in the Electoral College via a popular vote pitting incumbent Democratic President Barack Obama and his running mate, Vice President Joe Biden, against Republican challenger and former Massachusetts Governor Mitt Romney and his running mate, Congressman Paul Ryan.

Prior to the election, Nebraska was considered to be a state that Romney would win or a safe red state. Although statewide elections aren't competitive, Nebraska is one of only two states (along with Maine) which splits its electoral votes based on the winner of each congressional district. The winner of the statewide vote receives two electoral votes and the remaining 3 electoral votes are awarded based on the winner of each congressional district.

Mitt Romney won Nebraska's statewide vote, taking 59.80% of the vote to Barack Obama's 38.03%, a margin of 21.77%, a noticeable improvement over McCain's 15% margin in 2008.

Romney also won all 3 congressional districts, thus winning all 5 of the state's electoral votes. This was a change from 2008, when the state as a whole had voted for Republican John McCain but Democrat Barack Obama still won an electoral vote from the state. Nebraska's 2nd congressional district, home to Omaha, had split with the rest of the state and awarded one of Nebraska's electoral votes to a Democratic presidential nominee for the first time since 1964. Nebraska's 2nd congressional district, Indiana, and North Carolina were the only sources of electoral votes won by Obama in 2008 that Romney managed to flip. This was the first time in the 21st Century that Nebraska's 2nd Congressional District voted for the overall losing presidential candidate, a feat that would be reprised in 2024.

Obama only won a single county, Thurston, largely due to its majority and increasingly politically active Native American population. He also narrowly lost three of four counties he won in 2008: Douglas, Lancaster, and Saline, home to the cities of Omaha, Lincoln, and Crete, respectively. He became the first Democrat since Grover Cleveland in 1892 to win without carrying Saline County.

As of the 2024 presidential election, this is the last time that the Democrat won Thurston County and the Republican won Douglas or Lancaster County.

== Primary elections ==
=== Democratic primary ===
The Democratic primary was not held as Barack Obama ran unopposed and had secured enough delegates for nomination.

=== Republican primary ===
2012 Nebraska Republican presidential primary
- May 15, 2012

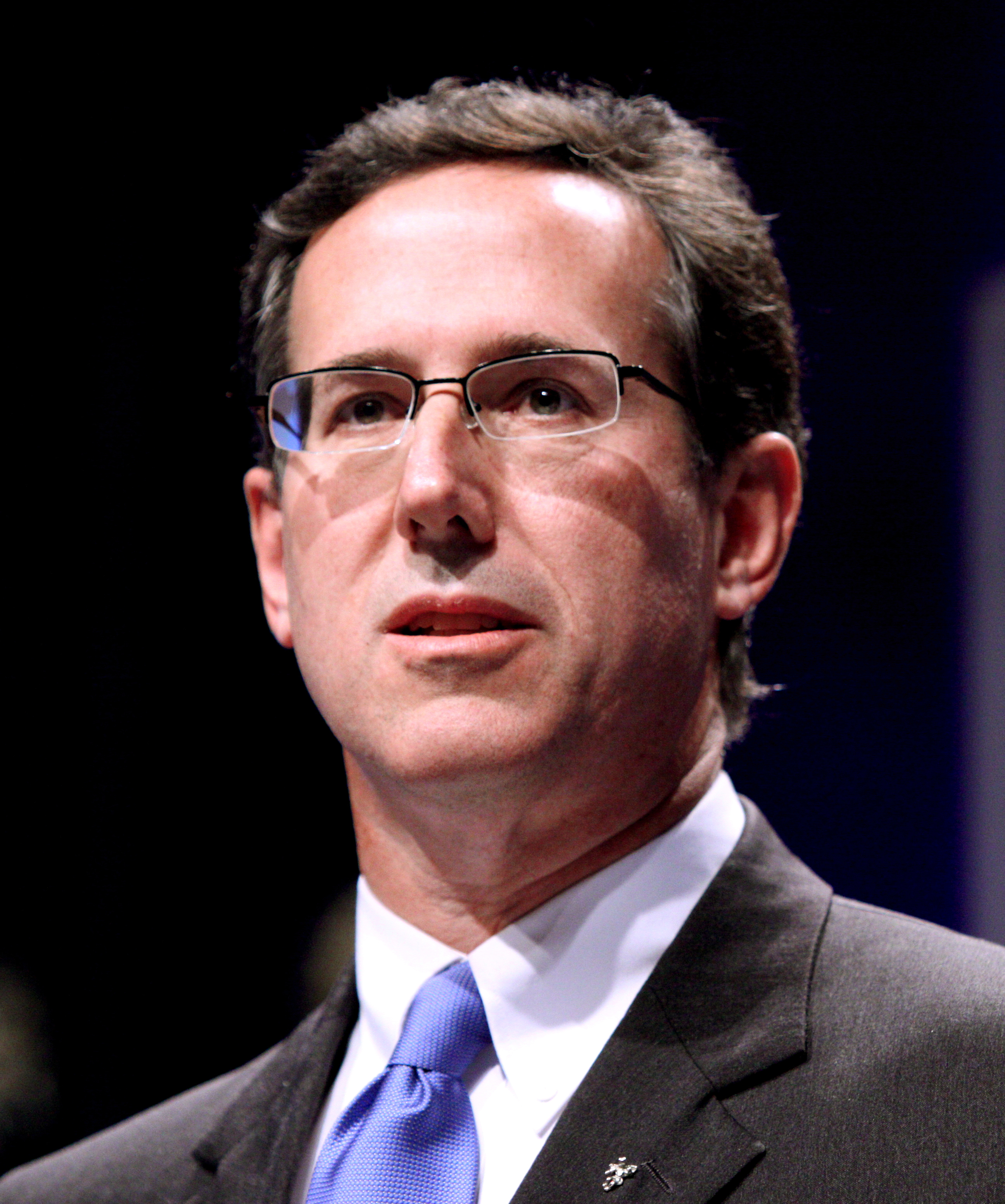

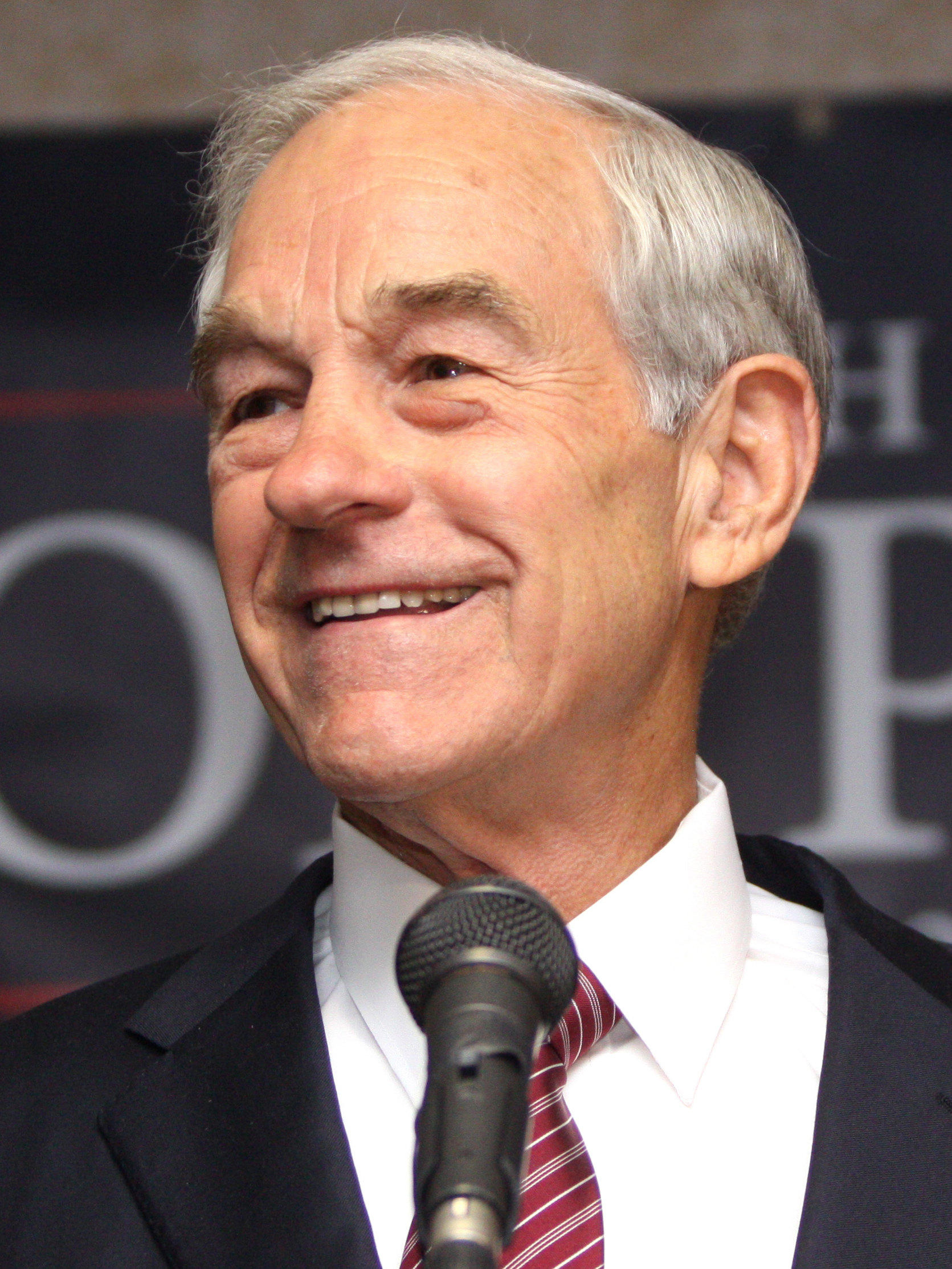

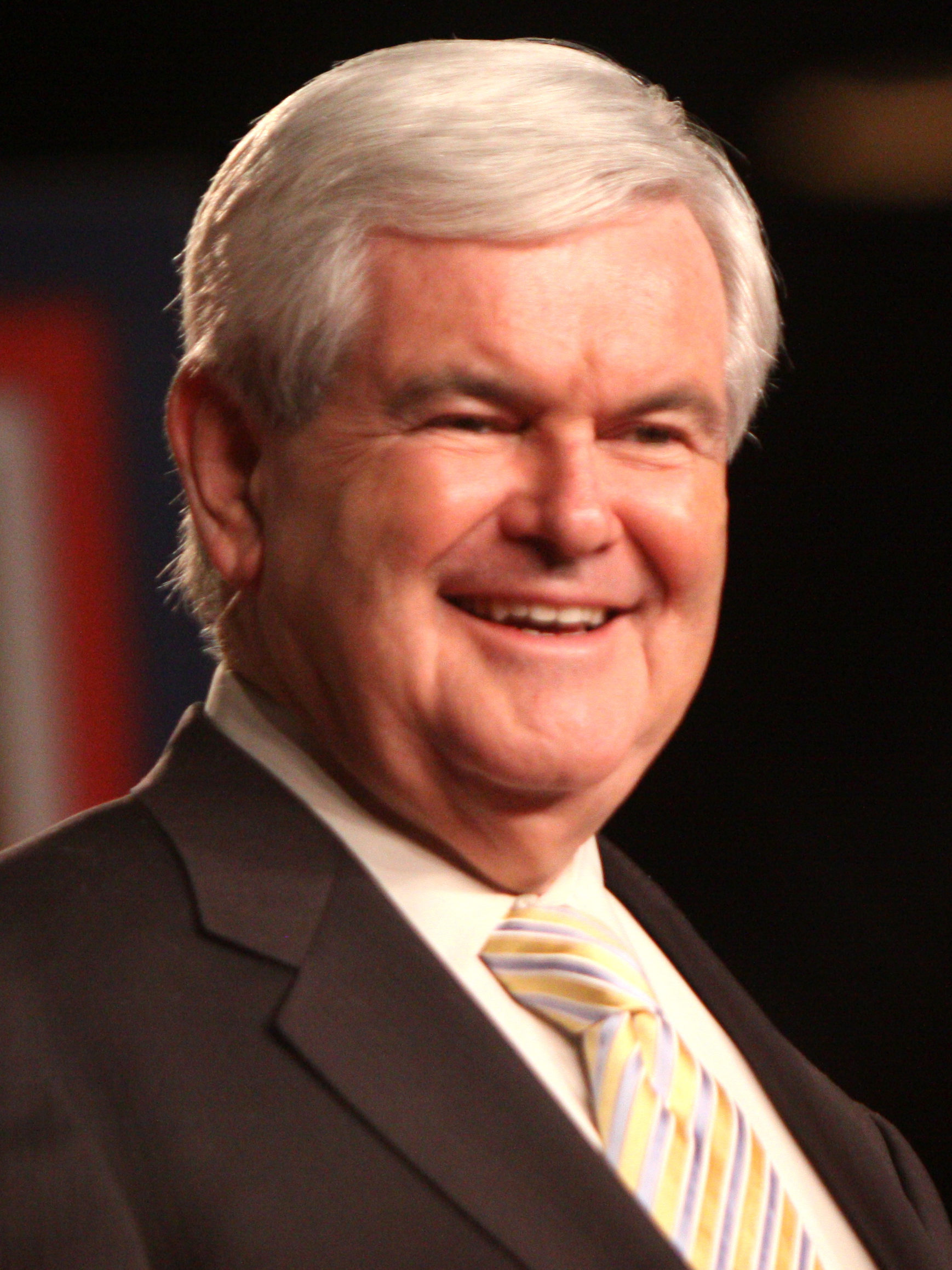
Candidate	Mitt Romney	Rick Santorum
Home state	Massachusetts	Pennsylvania
Delegate count	30	0
Popular vote	131,436	25,830
Percentage	70.89%	13.93%
Candidate	Ron Paul	Newt Gingrich
Home state	Texas	Georgia
Delegate count	2	0
Popular vote	18,508	9,628
Percentage	9.98%	5.19%
- Nebraska results by county Mitt Romney (Note: Italicization indicates a withdrawn candidacy)

The Republican primary was on May 15, 2012. This primary was purely of an advisory nature. From June 1 to June 10 caucuses county conventions caucused to elect delegates to the state convention. These delegates were not bound to vote for any candidate, but at the state convention on July 14, elected 32 bound National delegates. 3 party leaders attended the National Convention unbound, making a total of 35 voting delegates going to the national convention from Nebraska.

2012 Nebraska Republican primary
Candidate	Votes	Percentage	Delegates
Mitt Romney	131,436	70.89%	30
Rick Santorum	25,830	13.93%	0
Ron Paul	18,508	9.98%	2
Newt Gingrich	9,628	5.19%	0
Unpledged delegates:			3
Total:	185,402	100.0%	35

Key:	Withdrew prior to contest

==== Convention ====
The State Convention was held in Grand Island on July 14, 2012.

Convention Results
Candidate	1st	2nd	3rd	State	Party leaders	Total
Mitt Romney	3	1	3	23	2	32
Ron Paul	0	2	0	0	0	2
Unknown	0	0	0	0	1	1
Total	9			23	3	35

== General election ==
=== Predictions ===
Source	Ranking	As of
Huffington Post	Safe R	November 6, 2012
CNN	Safe R	November 6, 2012
New York Times	Safe R	November 6, 2012
Washington Post	Safe R	November 6, 2012
RealClearPolitics	Solid R	November 6, 2012
Sabato's Crystal Ball	Solid R	November 5, 2012
FiveThirtyEight	Solid R	November 6, 2012

Source	1st district	2nd district	3rd district	As of
New York Times	Safe R	Lean R (flip)	Safe R	November 6, 2012
Sabato's Crystal Ball	Safe R	Lean R (flip)	Safe R	November 5, 2012

=== Results ===
2012 United States presidential election in Nebraska
Party	Candidate	Running mate	Votes	Percentage	Electoral votes
Republican	Mitt Romney	Paul Ryan	475,064	59.80%	5
Democratic	Barack Obama (incumbent)	Joe Biden (incumbent)	302,081	38.03%	0
Libertarian	Gary Johnson	Jim Gray	11,109	1.40%	0
Write-Ins			3,717	0.47%	0
Independent	Randall Terry	Missy Smith	2,408	0.30%	0
Totals			794,379	100.00%	5

==== By county ====
County	Mitt Romney Republican		Barack Obama Democratic		Various candidates Other parties		Margin		Total
County	#	%	#	%	#	%	#	%	Total
Adams	8,316	65.64%	4,062	32.06%	292	2.30%	4,254	33.58%	12,670
Antelope	2,596	80.32%	571	17.67%	65	2.01%	2,025	62.65%	3,232
Arthur	227	86.64%	30	11.45%	5	1.91%	197	75.19%	262
Banner	346	84.18%	55	13.38%	10	2.44%	291	70.80%	411
Blaine	268	88.45%	29	9.57%	6	1.98%	239	78.88%	303
Boone	2,138	76.19%	615	21.92%	53	1.89%	1,523	54.27%	2,806
Box Butte	2,869	60.98%	1,692	35.96%	144	3.06%	1,177	25.02%	4,705
Boyd	873	81.51%	188	17.55%	10	0.94%	685	63.96%	1,071
Brown	1,302	83.73%	224	14.41%	29	1.86%	1,078	69.32%	1,555
Buffalo	13,570	69.76%	5,365	27.58%	518	2.66%	8,205	42.18%	19,453
Burt	2,029	60.12%	1,291	38.25%	55	1.63%	738	21.87%	3,375
Butler	2,738	70.95%	1,045	27.08%	76	1.97%	1,693	43.87%	3,859
Cass	7,556	62.04%	4,367	35.85%	257	2.11%	3,189	26.19%	12,180
Cedar	3,278	75.63%	958	22.10%	98	2.27%	2,320	53.53%	4,334
Chase	1,584	84.84%	254	13.60%	29	1.56%	1,330	71.24%	1,867
Cherry	2,557	83.45%	436	14.23%	71	2.32%	2,121	69.22%	3,064
Cheyenne	3,449	74.19%	1,084	23.32%	116	2.49%	2,365	50.87%	4,649
Clay	2,232	75.74%	667	22.63%	48	1.63%	1,565	53.11%	2,947
Colfax	2,051	66.83%	969	31.57%	49	1.60%	1,082	35.26%	3,069
Cuming	2,876	72.33%	1,031	25.93%	69	1.74%	1,845	46.40%	3,976
Custer	4,296	78.14%	1,083	19.70%	119	2.16%	3,213	58.44%	5,498
Dakota	3,094	50.42%	2,922	47.62%	120	1.96%	172	2.80%	6,136
Dawes	2,478	66.47%	1,132	30.36%	118	3.17%	1,346	36.11%	3,728
Dawson	5,460	69.47%	2,199	27.98%	200	2.55%	3,261	41.49%	7,859
Deuel	763	75.02%	215	21.14%	39	3.84%	548	53.88%	1,017
Dixon	1,745	64.97%	870	32.39%	71	2.64%	875	32.58%	2,686
Dodge	8,995	60.17%	5,673	37.95%	282	1.88%	3,322	22.22%	14,950
Douglas	113,220	50.56%	106,456	47.54%	4,251	1.90%	6,764	3.02%	223,927
Dundy	792	80.41%	176	17.87%	17	1.72%	616	62.54%	985
Fillmore	2,007	69.71%	807	28.03%	65	2.26%	1,200	41.68%	2,879
Franklin	1,112	72.40%	384	25.00%	40	2.60%	728	47.40%	1,536
Frontier	1,007	77.16%	271	20.77%	27	2.07%	736	56.39%	1,305
Furnas	1,782	79.55%	423	18.88%	35	1.57%	1,359	60.67%	2,240
Gage	5,513	57.06%	3,903	40.40%	245	2.54%	1,610	16.66%	9,661
Garden	829	75.99%	242	22.18%	20	1.83%	587	53.81%	1,091
Garfield	769	81.81%	149	15.85%	22	2.34%	620	65.96%	940
Gosper	734	75.05%	230	23.52%	14	1.43%	504	51.53%	978
Grant	322	88.71%	30	8.26%	11	3.03%	292	80.45%	363
Greeley	820	69.20%	340	28.69%	25	2.11%	480	40.51%	1,185
Hall	12,646	62.51%	7,161	35.40%	422	2.09%	5,485	27.11%	20,229
Hamilton	3,600	73.91%	1,146	23.53%	125	2.56%	2,454	50.38%	4,871
Harlan	1,395	78.46%	354	19.91%	29	1.63%	1,041	58.55%	1,778
Hayes	476	88.31%	51	9.46%	12	2.23%	425	78.85%	539
Hitchcock	1,178	78.80%	274	18.33%	43	2.87%	904	60.47%	1,495
Holt	3,922	79.41%	882	17.86%	135	2.73%	3,040	61.55%	4,939
Hooker	330	83.54%	59	14.94%	6	1.52%	271	68.60%	395
Howard	1,890	65.85%	914	31.85%	66	2.30%	976	34.00%	2,870
Jefferson	2,166	62.86%	1,195	34.68%	85	2.46%	971	28.18%	3,446
Johnson	1,225	59.38%	790	38.29%	48	2.33%	435	21.09%	2,063
Kearney	2,349	73.87%	773	24.31%	58	1.82%	1,576	49.56%	3,180
Keith	3,044	75.01%	928	22.87%	86	2.12%	2,116	52.14%	4,058
Keya Paha	393	81.20%	80	16.53%	11	2.27%	313	64.67%	484
Kimball	1,235	73.21%	395	23.41%	57	3.38%	840	49.80%	1,687
Knox	2,885	71.48%	1,059	26.24%	92	2.28%	1,826	45.24%	4,036
Lancaster	62,434	49.02%	62,015	48.69%	2,906	2.29%	419	0.33%	127,355
Lincoln	10,728	68.53%	4,450	28.43%	477	3.06%	6,278	40.10%	15,655
Logan	356	82.60%	68	15.78%	7	1.62%	288	66.82%	431
Loup	290	81.01%	62	17.32%	6	1.67%	228	63.69%	358
Madison	10,062	72.47%	3,485	25.10%	338	2.43%	6,577	47.37%	13,885
McPherson	237	81.44%	41	14.09%	13	4.47%	196	67.35%	291
Merrick	2,490	71.37%	925	26.51%	74	2.12%	1,565	44.86%	3,489
Morrill	1,681	76.76%	455	20.78%	54	2.46%	1,226	55.98%	2,190
Nance	1,106	68.23%	481	29.67%	34	2.10%	625	38.56%	1,621
Nemaha	2,012	62.60%	1,128	35.10%	74	2.30%	884	27.50%	3,214
Nuckolls	1,574	71.84%	568	25.92%	49	2.24%	1,006	45.92%	2,191
Otoe	4,258	60.99%	2,561	36.68%	163	2.33%	1,697	24.31%	6,982
Pawnee	899	67.04%	400	29.83%	42	3.13%	499	37.21%	1,341
Perkins	1,135	81.42%	238	17.07%	21	1.51%	897	64.35%	1,394
Phelps	3,400	77.63%	880	20.09%	100	2.28%	2,520	57.54%	4,380
Pierce	2,707	78.90%	637	18.57%	87	2.53%	2,070	60.33%	3,431
Platte	10,061	74.68%	3,148	23.37%	264	1.95%	6,913	51.31%	13,473
Polk	1,890	76.92%	528	21.49%	39	1.59%	1,362	55.43%	2,457
Red Willow	3,891	78.83%	952	19.29%	93	1.88%	2,939	59.54%	4,936
Richardson	2,443	65.34%	1,191	31.85%	105	2.81%	1,252	33.49%	3,739
Rock	672	85.17%	103	13.05%	14	1.78%	569	72.12%	789
Saline	2,557	51.57%	2,289	46.17%	112	2.26%	268	5.40%	4,958
Sarpy	43,213	60.45%	26,671	37.31%	1,606	2.24%	16,542	23.14%	71,490
Saunders	6,770	65.65%	3,307	32.07%	235	2.28%	3,463	33.58%	10,312
Scotts Bluff	9,648	67.53%	4,327	30.29%	312	2.18%	5,321	37.24%	14,287
Seward	5,003	66.06%	2,386	31.51%	184	2.43%	2,617	34.55%	7,573
Sheridan	2,021	81.76%	390	15.78%	61	2.46%	1,631	65.98%	2,472
Sherman	927	60.59%	552	36.08%	51	3.33%	375	24.51%	1,530
Sioux	624	84.44%	101	13.67%	14	1.89%	523	70.77%	739
Stanton	1,949	73.71%	614	23.22%	81	3.07%	1,335	50.49%	2,644
Thayer	1,874	70.48%	728	27.38%	57	2.14%	1,146	43.10%	2,659
Thomas	360	88.24%	42	10.29%	6	1.47%	318	77.95%	408
Thurston	939	42.39%	1,247	56.30%	29	1.31%	-308	-13.91%	2,215
Valley	1,657	75.49%	498	22.69%	40	1.82%	1,159	52.80%	2,195
Washington	6,899	67.33%	3,132	30.57%	215	2.10%	3,767	36.76%	10,246
Wayne	2,493	67.71%	1,074	29.17%	115	3.12%	1,419	38.54%	3,682
Webster	1,258	72.22%	442	25.37%	42	2.41%	816	46.85%	1,742
Wheeler	345	77.01%	93	20.76%	10	2.23%	252	56.25%	448
York	4,874	76.70%	1,373	21.61%	108	1.69%	3,501	55.09%	6,355
Totals	475,064	59.80%	302,081	38.03%	17,234	2.17%	172,983	21.77%	794,379

Counties that flipped from Democratic to Republican

- Douglas (largest city: Omaha)
- Lancaster (largest city: Lincoln)
- Saline (largest city: Crete)

==== By congressional district ====
Romney won all three of Nebraska's congressional districts.

District	Romney	Obama	Representative
1st	57%	41%	Jeff Fortenberry
2nd	53%	46%	Lee Terry
3rd	70%	28%	Adrian Smith

== See also ==
- United States presidential elections in Nebraska
- 2012 Republican Party presidential debates and forums
- 2012 Republican Party presidential primaries
- Results of the 2012 Republican Party presidential primaries
- Nebraska Republican Party
