= 2024 Nebraska elections =

The 2024 Nebraska elections were held on November 5, 2024. Voters in Nebraska elected both of the state's members of the United States Senate, all three members of the United States House of Representatives, half of the seats in the state legislature, and seats on the Public Service Commission, State Board of Education, and Board of Regents.

== President and vice president of the United States ==
2024 United States presidential election in Nebraska
Party	Candidate	Votes	%	±%
Republican	Donald Trump; JD Vance	564,816	59.32%	+1.10%
Democratic	Kamala Harris; Tim Walz	369,995	38.86%	−0.31%
Libertarian	Chase Oliver; Mike ter Maat	6,399	0.67%	−1.45%
Legal Marijuana Now	Cornel West; Melina Abdullah	3,062	0.32%	N/A
Green	Jill Stein (Note: Listed on the ballot without party affiliation.); Samson Kpadenou (Note: Replacement for Butch Ware, Stein's vice presidential nominee.)	2,887	0.30%	N/A
Write-in		5,023	0.53%	+0.04%
Total votes		952,182	100.00%	N/A

== United States Senate ==
=== Class I Senate seat ===
Incumbent Republican Senator Deb Fischer ran for re-election to a third term in the Senate. She did not face any major-party opposition, and was instead challenged by independent Dan Osborn, who had the support of the Nebraska Democratic Party. Fischer narrowly defeated Osborn to win re-election.

2024 United States Senate election in Nebraska
Party	Candidate	Votes	%	±%
Republican	Deb Fischer (inc.)	499,124	53.19%	−4.50%
Independent	Dan Osborn	436,493	46.52%	—
Write-in		2,719	0.29%	—
Majority		62,631	6.67%	−12.39%
Total votes		938,336	100.00%	
Republican hold				

=== Class II Senate seat ===
In 2023, Senator Ben Sasse resigned to become the president of the University of Florida. Governor Jim Pillen appointed outgoing Governor Pete Ricketts as Sasse's successor. and called a special election in 2024 to fill out the remaining two years of Sasse's term. Ricketts ran for re-election and faced Democratic nominee Preston Love Jr. in the general election. Ricketts defeated Love in a landslide to win re-election.

2024 United States Senate special election in Nebraska
Party	Candidate	Votes	%	±%
Republican	Pete Ricketts (inc.)	585,103	62.58%	−0.16%
Democratic	Preston Love Jr.	349,902	37.42%	+12.99%
Majority		235,201	25.16%	−13.15%
Total votes		935,005	100.0%	
Republican hold				

== United States House of Representatives ==
All three incumbent members of the House of Representatives ran for re-election, and all three were re-elected.

District	Republican		Democratic		Others		Total		Result
District	Votes	%	Votes	%	Votes	%	Votes	%	Result
District 1	187,559	60.10%	124,498	39.90%	0	0.00%	312,057	100%	Republican hold
District 2	160,198	50.93%	154,369	49.07%	0	0.00%	314,567	100%	Republican hold
District 3	243,481	80.42%	59,287	19.58%	0	0.00%	302,768	100%	Republican hold
Total	591,238	63.62%	338,154	36.38%	0	0.00%	929,392	100%	

== Public Service Commission ==
=== District 1 ===
Incumbent Commissioner Dan Watermeier ran for re-election to a second term and faced no opposition.

==== Republican primary ====
===== Candidates =====
- Dan Watermeier, incumbent commissioner

===== Results =====
District 1 results
Party	Candidate	Votes	%
Republican	Dan Watermeier (inc.)	32,590	100.00%
Total votes		32,590	100.00%

==== General election ====
2024 District 1 election
Party	Candidate	Votes	%
Republican	Dan Watermeier (inc.)	137,263	100.00%
Total votes		137,263	100.00%
Republican hold			

=== District 3 ===
Incumbent Republican Commissioner Tim Schram ran for re-election to a fourth term. He was re-elected unopposed.

==== Republican primary ====
===== Candidates =====
- Tim Schram, incumbent commissioner

===== Results =====
District 3 results
Party	Candidate	Votes	%
Republican	Tim Schram (inc.)	33,306	100.00%
Total votes		33,306	100.00%

==== General election ====
2024 District 3 election
Party	Candidate	Votes	%
Republican	Tim Schram (inc.)	162,613	100.00%
Total votes		162,613	100.00%
Republican hold			

== State Board of Education ==
Following gains by social conservatives on the State Board of Education in 2022, conservative challengers sought to gain control of the State Board in the 2024 elections. The Protect Nebraska Children political action committee endorsed socially conservative candidates, while the Nebraska State Education Association (NSEA) supported moderate and liberal candidates. Following the election, after conservative-aligned candidate Lisa Schonhoff was elected to succeed moderate Patti Gubbels in the 3rd district, control of the board flipped to conservatives.

=== District 1 ===
Incumbent board member Patsy Koch John declined to seek re-election. Kristin Christensen, a former teacher who worked for a literacy nonprofit, and Liz Davids, a homeschooling advocate, ran to replace her. Christensen was supported by the Nebraska State Education Association, and Davids ran with the support of Protect Nebraska Children. Christensen defeated Davids by a wide margin in the general election, winning 58% of the vote.

==== Candidates ====
- Kristin Christensen, former teacher
- Liz Davids, homeschooling advocate

==== Primary election results ====
Nonpartisan primary results
Party	Candidate	Votes	%
Nonpartisan	Kristin Christensen	22,079	61.07%
Nonpartisan	Liz Davids	14,078	38.93%
Total votes		36,157	100.00%

==== General election results ====
Nonpartisan general results
Party	Candidate	Votes	%
Nonpartisan	Kristin Christensen	51,497	58.33%
Nonpartisan	Liz Davids	36,790	41.67%
Total votes		88,287	100.00%

=== District 2 ===
Incumbent board member Lisa Fricke declined to seek re-election. One Republican, former clinical psychology professor Linda Vermooten, and two Democrats, retired teachers Maggie Douglas and Karen Morgan, ran to succeed her. Vermooten, who was supported by Protect Nebraska Children, and Douglas, who was endorsed by the NSEA, both advanced to the general election. In the general election, Douglas narrowly defeated Vermooten.

==== Candidates ====
- Maggie Douglas, former teacher
- Karen Morgan, former teacher
- Linda Vermooten, former Grace University clinical psychology professor

==== Primary election results ====
Nonpartisan primary results
Party	Candidate	Votes	%
Nonpartisan	Linda Vermooten	14,112	42.79%
Nonpartisan	Maggie Douglas	10,915	33.09%
Nonpartisan	Karen Morgan	6,269	24.12%
Total votes		31,296	100.00%

==== General election results ====
Nonpartisan general results
Party	Candidate	Votes	%
Nonpartisan	Maggie Douglas	42,156	53.93%
Nonpartisan	Linda Vermooten	36,028	46.07%
Total votes		78,184	100.00%

=== District 3 ===
Incumbent board member Patti Gubbels declined to seek re-election. Two Republicans, former teacher Lisa Schonhoff and former school administrator Bill McAllister, ran to succeed her. Schonhoff won the endorsement of the Nebraska Republican Party, and defeated McAllister by a wide margin.

==== Candidates ====
- Bill McAllister, former school administrator
- Lisa Schonhoff, former teacher

==== Primary election results ====
Nonpartisan primary results
Party	Candidate	Votes	%
Nonpartisan	Lisa Schonhoff	23,884	59.91%
Nonpartisan	Bill McAllister	15,989	40.09%
Total votes		39,873	100.00%

==== General election results ====
Nonpartisan general results
Party	Candidate	Votes	%
Nonpartisan	Lisa Schonhoff	66,822	63.08%
Nonpartisan	Bill McAllister	39,080	36.92%
Total votes		105,902	100.00%

=== District 4 ===
Incumbent Board member Jacquelyn Morrison declined to seek re-election and resigned in October 2024, leaving the seat vacant at the time of the election. Writer and producer Liz Renner, who produced documentaries about the state's public schools, ran to succeed her, along with administrator Stacy Matula and homeschool advocate LeDonna Griffin. Renner placed first in the primary, winning 45% of the vote, while Griffin narrowly edged out Matula, who was endorsed by Protect Nebraska Children, winning 28% of the vote to Matula's 27%. In the general election, Renner defeated Griffin in a landslide, winning 63% of the vote.

==== Candidates ====
- Stacy Matula, administrator
- Liz Renner, documentarian
- LeDonna White Griffin, homeschool advocate

==== Primary election results ====
Nonpartisan primary results
Party	Candidate	Votes	%
Nonpartisan	Liz Renner	11,296	45.35%
Nonpartisan	LeDonna White Griffin	6,900	27.71%
Nonpartisan	Stacy Matula	5,842	26.94%
Total votes		24,038	100.00%

==== General election results ====
Nonpartisan general results
Party	Candidate	Votes	%
Nonpartisan	Liz Renner	42,609	62.86%
Nonpartisan	LeDonna White Griffin	25,185	37.14%
Total votes		67,794	100.00%

== University of Nebraska Board of Regents ==
=== District 3 ===
Incumbent Regent Jim Scheer, who was appointed to the Board of Regents in 2023, ran for re-election to a full term. He was unopposed and won re-election uncontested.

==== Candidates ====
- Jim Scheer, incumbent regent

==== Primary election results ====
Nonpartisan primary results
Party	Candidate	Votes	%
Nonpartisan	Jim Scheer (inc.)	34,840	100.00%
Total votes		34,840	100.00%

==== General election results ====
Nonpartisan general results
Party	Candidate	Votes	%
Nonpartisan	Jim Scheer (inc.)	83,560	100.00%
Total votes		83,560	100.00%

=== District 4 ===
Incumbent Regent Elizabeth O'Connor ran for re-election to a second term. She was challenged by Jim Rogers, a retired mathematics professor at the University of Nebraska Omaha.

==== Candidates ====
- Elizabeth R. O'Connor, incumbent regent
- Jim Rogers, retired University of Nebraska Omaha professor

==== Primary election results ====
Nonpartisan primary results
Party	Candidate	Votes	%
Nonpartisan	Elizabeth R. O'Connor (inc.)	15,031	66.70%
Nonpartisan	Jim Rogers	7,505	33.30%
Total votes		22,536	100.00%

==== General election results ====
Nonpartisan general results
Party	Candidate	Votes	%
Nonpartisan	Elizabeth R. O'Connor (inc.)	42,320	67.14%
Nonpartisan	Jim Rogers	20,692	32.86%
Total votes		63,012	100.00%

=== District 5 ===
Incumbent Regent Rob Schafer, the chair of the board, ran for re-election. He was challenged by Gary Rogge, a retired farmer, and Jerome Wohleb, a retired hospital administrator. Schafer placed first in the primary with 48% of the vote and advanced to the general election against Rogge, who won 22%. Schafer ultimately defeated Rogge in a landslide, winning 63% of the vote.

==== Candidates ====
- Gary L. Rogge, retired farmer
- Rob Schafer, incumbent regent
- Jerome Wohleb, retired hospital administrator

==== Primary election results ====
Nonpartisan primary results
Party	Candidate	Votes	%
Nonpartisan	Rob Schafer (inc.)	22,606	47.83%
Nonpartisan	Gary L. Rogge	10,562	22.36%
Nonpartisan	Jerome Wohleb	7,873	16.63%
Total votes		41,041	100.00%

==== General election results ====
Nonpartisan general results
Party	Candidate	Votes	%
Nonpartisan	Rob Schafer (inc.)	61,916	63.49%
Nonpartisan	Gary L. Rogge	35,603	36.51%
Total votes		97,519	100.00%

=== District 8 ===
Incumbent Regent Barbara Weitz ran for re-election to a second term. She was challenged by Zach Mellender, an IT technician at the Omaha Zoo. She defeated Mellender in a landslide, winning 64% of the vote.

==== Candidates ====
- Zachary Mellender, IT technician at Omaha's Henry Doorly Zoo and Aquarium
- Barbara Weitz, incumbent regent

==== Primary election results ====
Nonpartisan primary results
Party	Candidate	Votes	%
Nonpartisan	Barbara Weitz (inc.)	24,173	66.00%
Nonpartisan	Zachary Mellender	12,464	34.00%
Total votes		36,637	100.00%

==== General election results ====
Nonpartisan general results
Party	Candidate	Votes	%
Nonpartisan	Barbara Weitz (inc.)	61,544	63.54%
Nonpartisan	Zachary Mellender	35,357	36.46%
Total votes		96,901	100.00%

== See also ==
- Elections in Nebraska
- Political party strength in Nebraska
- Nebraska Democratic Party
- Nebraska Republican Party
- Government of Nebraska
- 2024 United States elections
