= Crystal Rhoades =

American politician (born 1978)

Clerk of the District Court of Douglas County
- Incumbent
- Assumed office January 5, 2023
- Preceded by: John Friend

Member of the Nebraska Public Service Commission from the 2nd district
- In office January 8, 2015 – January 5, 2023
- Preceded by: Anne Boyle
- Succeeded by: Christian Mirch

Personal details
- Born: March 17, 1978 (age 48) Omaha, Nebraska, U.S.
- Party: Democratic
- Education: University of Nebraska, Omaha (BA, MS)

Crystal Rhoades (born March 17, 1978) is an American politician serving as the Douglas County, Nebraska, clerk of the district court since 2023. She was elected to the position in 2022 and took office on January 5, 2023. Rhoades is a Democrat.

Previously, Rhoades served as a member of the Metropolitan Community College Board from 2006 to 2014 and of the Nebraska Public Service Commission from the 2nd district from 2015 to 2023. She was elected in 2014 to succeed long-time commissioner Anne Boyle and was re-elected in 2020. She resigned in 2023 to assume her role as clerk of the District Court.

Rhoades was a candidate for the U.S. House of Representatives in the 2026 election in Nebraska's 2nd congressional district, and finished third in the Democratic primary.

== Early career ==
Rhoades graduated from Omaha Central High School and later attended the University of Nebraska Omaha as a Goodrich Scholar, graduating with her Bachelor of Arts in political science and psychology in 2004. After graduating, she worked as assistant executive director of the Neighborhood Center for Greater Omaha and continued her studies at the University of Nebraska, receiving her Master of Science in political science in 2010.

In 2006, Rhoades ran for the Metropolitan Community College Board of Governors from the 4th District, challenging incumbent Director Gary Kiel. She placed first in the nonpartisan May primary, winning 40.4% of the vote (4,975 votes) to Kiel's 37.3% (4,584 votes) and Steve Brock's 22.3% (3,920 votes). She advanced to the general election against Kiel and narrowly defeated him with 53% of the vote. She was re-elected unopposed in 2010.

== Public Service Commission ==
In 2014, when long-time commissioner Anne Boyle announced that she would not seek re-election to another term on the Nebraska Public Service Commission, Rhoades ran to succeed her in the 2nd district, which includes most of metropolitan Omaha. In the Democratic primary, Rhoades faced attorney and former congressional candidate Jim Esch, and John Green, an attorney and a member of the Omaha Public Power District board of directors. She won Boyle's endorsement to succeed her. During the campaign, one of the biggest issues concerned whether rideshare companies like Uber and Lyft should be permitted to operate in Nebraska. The Public Service Commission, which has responsibility for regulating taxis, required the companies to apply for state certificates before they could operate. Esch argued that the companies ought to be permitted to operate, while Rhoades argued that they needed to proceed through the proper licensing process. Ultimately, Rhoades won the Democratic nomination, winning 42.4% of the vote (5,974 votes) to Esch's 39.1% (5,507 votes) and Green's 16.1% (2,265 votes). In the general election, she faced Republican nominee John Sieler and won with 56% of the vote.

As a member of the Public Service Commission, Rhoades voted against construction of the Keystone XL pipeline, which was approved by the commission by a 3–2 vote with an alternative route. Rhoades criticized the commission's action, arguing that there was "no evidence" that the pipeline would create jobs, and that there "was very little or almost no evidence presented" about the "mainline alternative route" that was approved, which she suggested "was going to violate the due process of the landowners."

Rhoades was elected as chair of the Douglas County Democratic Party in 2016. She clashed with Jane Kleeb, the chair of the Nebraska Democratic Party, during her tenure, and in 2019, Kleeb endorsed another candidate for the spot over Rhoades. Ultimately, Rhoades declined to seek another term as chair, citing her desire to focus on her responsibilities on the Public Service Commission.

In 2020, Rhoades ran for re-election to the Public Service Commission, and was challenged by Republican Tim Davis, a restaurant server. Davis attacked Rhoades for opposing the pipeline, which he argued would create construction jobs. She was re-elected over Davis, winning 63 percent of the vote to his 37 percent.

== Douglas County clerk of the district court ==
In 2022, Rhoades ran for Douglas County clerk of the district court after incumbent John Friend announced his retirement. She won the Democratic primary with 65% of the vote. In the general election, she defeated Republican nominee Thomas Flynn, winning 51.0% of the vote (94,346 votes) to Flynn's 48.9% (90,502 votes).

== U.S House campaign ==
On July 21, 2025, Rhoades announced that she was running to be the Democratic nominee for the U.S House of Representatives in Nebraska's 2nd congressional district. Rhoades placed third in the primary election.
