= Tim Schram =

American politician

Member of the Nebraska Public Service Commission from the 5th district
- Incumbent
- Assumed office January 7, 2007
- Preceded by: Lowell Johnson

Personal details
- Born: October 20, 1961 (age 64)
- Party: Republican
- Spouse: Laura
- Education: University of Nebraska–Lincoln (BS)

Tim Schram (born October 20, 1961) is an American Republican politician currently serving as a member of the Nebraska Public Service Commission from the 3rd district. He was first elected in 2006 and re-elected in 2012, 2018, and 2024, making him the longest-serving current member of the Commission.

== Early career ==
Schram graduated from Ashland-Greenwood High School in Ashland, Nebraska, and attended the University of Nebraska–Lincoln, graduating with his bachelor's degree in agricultural economics in 1986. He started Schram Auction, an auction house in Gretna, and was appointed to the Sarpy County Planning Commission and the Sarpy County Extension Board. In 1994, he ran for the Sarpy County Commission, challenging incumbent Commissioner Bob Woolman in the Republican primary. Schram defeated Woolman by a wide margin and faced Democrat Randy Penke in the general election. Woolman ran in the general election as a write-in candidate, but Schram won in a landslide, receiving 67% of the vote to Penke's 27% and Woolman's 6%. In 1998, Schram ran for re-election and faced Ashland City Attorney Larry Morten in the Republican primary. Schram defeated Morten by a wide margin and was unopposed in the general election. He was re-elected unopposed in 2002.

== Nebraska Public Service Commission ==
In 2006, two-term incumbent Public Service Commissioner Lowell Johnson announced that he would not seek re-election, and Schram ran to succeed him. He faced real estate agent Rich Hurley in the Republican primary. The Omaha World-Herald endorsed Schram over Hurley, praising Schram's experience as a county commissioner and noting that he "likely would have less of a learning curve" than Hurley. Schram narrowly defeated Hurley, winning 52.5% to Hurley's 47.5%. In the general election, Schram faced State Senator Matt Connealy, the Democratic nominee. The World-Herald endorsed Connealy over Schram, noting that both were strong candidates, but that "Connealy's State Capitol service means he could more quickly acclimate to the panel's potpourri of responsibilities." Ultimately, Schram defeated Connealy by a wide margin, winning 58.2% of the vote.

Schram was re-elected without opposition in 2012. In 2018, he was challenged by Democrat Mike Forsythe, a retired business executive. While the controversial Keystone XL pipeline was a significant issue in the other Public Service Commission election that year, it played a muted role in the District 3 race. Schram defeated Forsythe by a wide margin, winning 62% of the vote to Forsythe's 38%. Schram won his fourth term unopposed in 2024.
