= Eric Kamler =

American politician (born 1991)

Member of the Nebraska Public Service Commission from the 4th district
- Incumbent
- Assumed office January 5, 2023
- Preceded by: Rod Johnson

Personal details
- Born: May 13, 1991 (age 35) York, Nebraska, U.S.
- Party: Republican
- Education: University of Nebraska–Lincoln (BS)

Eric Kamler (born May 13, 1991) is an American Republican politician currently serving as a member of the Nebraska Public Service Commission from the 4th district.

== Early career ==
Kamler was born in York, Nebraska, and graduated from graduated from Fillmore Central School in 2009. He attended the University of Nebraska–Lincoln, where he served as the student body president and as a student regent, graduating with his bachelor's degree in agricultural economics in 2015. After graduating, he returned to his family farm, where he raised corn, soybeans, and sorghum, and managed a seed dealership. He also worked for Congressman Adrian Smith as an agricultural liaison. In 2014, Kamler was elected to the Geneva City Council, and in 2018, he was elected as the Mayor.

In 2019, following reports of damage to buildings and staffing shortages at the Youth Rehabilitation and Treatment Center in Geneva, the Nebraska Department of Health and Human Services temporarily relocated twenty-four girls who were incarcerated at the Center to a similar facility in Kearney. Kamler lobbied against the permanent closure of the facility, which was one of the largest employers in the city, but several months later, the Department announced that it would continue to house juvenile offenders in Kearney as it re-evaluated the state's youth rehabilitation and treatment center system.

== Nebraska Public Service Commission ==
In 2022, Kamler announced that he would run for the Nebraska Public Service Commission from the 4th District, challenging long-time incumbent Rod Johnson in the Republican primary. During the campaign, Kamler attacked Johnson for his poor attendance record as a member of the Commission, and emphasized that he would work to expand internet coverage to rural communities, noting that he would work to "ensure rural Nebraskans have the same access of digital technology needed to remain competitive on the world stage" as other parts of the state.

In his campaign, Kamler was endorsed by much of the state's Republican establishment, including former Governor Dave Heineman, Congressman Don Bacon, State Auditor Charlie Janssen, and State Legislative Speaker Mike Hilgers. Kamler ultimately defeated Johnson by a wide margin, winning 57.6% of the vote to Johnson's 42.4%. He was unopposed in the general election.
