= Dan Watermeier =

American politician

Member of the Nebraska Public Service Commission from the 1st district
- Incumbent
- Assumed office January 9, 2019
- Preceded by: Frank E. Landis

Chair of the Executive Board of the Nebraska Legislature
- In office January 4, 2017 – January 9, 2019
- Preceded by: Bob Krist
- Succeeded by: Mike Hilgers

Member of the Nebraska Legislature from the 1st district
- In office January 9, 2013 – January 9, 2019
- Preceded by: Lavon Heidemann
- Succeeded by: Julie Slama

Personal details
- Born: May 29, 1961 (age 65) Lincoln, Nebraska, U.S.
- Party: Republican
- Spouse: Jean Laessle
- Children: 3
- Education: University of Nebraska–Lincoln (BS)
- Website: Official website

Dan Watermeier (born May 29, 1961) is an American politician currently serving as a member of the Nebraska Public Service Commission from the 1st district. He was elected in 2018 and began his term in 2019, succeeding Frank E. Landis. Prior to his election to the Public Service Commission, Watermeier served in the Nebraska Legislature, representing District 1 from 2013 to 2019.

== Early career ==
Watermeier graduated from Syracuse-Dunbar-Avoca High School in 1979 and attended the University of Nebraska–Lincoln, graduating with his bachelor's degree in agriculture in 1983. He later owned and operated a farm in Syracuse. Watermeier was elected as a Nemaha Natural Resources District Director from Subdistrict Two in 2006 and 2010, winning both times unopposed.

== State legislature ==
In 2012, when incumbent Senator Lavon Heidemann was unable to seek re-election due to term limits, Watermeier ran to succeed him in the 1st District, which included Johnson, Nemaha, Otoe, Pawnee, and Richardson counties in southeastern Nebraska. Watermeier faced college administrator and Stella Mayor Jerry Joy in the nonpartisan primary election, along with Douglas Bohling, Bruce Bernadt, Alvin Guenther, and Neal Schatz. Watermeier received 32.7% of the vote, placing first and advancing to the general election against Joy, who received 27.4% of the vote. Both candidates campaigned in the general election as conservatives, though Watermeier was a Republican and Joy a Democrat, with both supporting capital punishment and opposing abortion rights. Watermeier was endorsed by business groups like the Nebraska Farm Bureau and Nebraska Chamber of Commerce, while Joy was supported by the Nebraska State Education Association and local unions. Ultimately, Watermeier defeated Joy, winning 56% of the vote. Watermeier was re-elected without opposition in 2016.

== Public Service Commission ==
In 2018, long-time Public Service Commissioner Frank E. Landis, who was first elected in 1988, declined to seek re-election, and Watermeier ran to succeed him in the 1st District, which overlapped with most of his legislative district. He faced Ron Nolte, a retired pilot and farmer, and Scott Smathers, the executive director of the Nebraska Sportsmen's Foundation, in the Republican primary. Watermeier won the primary by a wide margin, winning 59% of the vote to Nolte's 24% and Smathers's 17%.

In the general election, Watermeier faced Democratic nominee Christa Yoakum, a community organizer. The race was fought in part over the controversial Keystone XL pipeline, with Watermeier in support of it and Yoakum opposed. Ultimately, Watermeier narrowly defeated Yoakum, winning 51.1% to her 48.9%. Watermeier won his second term unopposed in 2024.

Nebraska Legislature
Preceded by Bob Krist	Chair of the Executive Board of the Nebraska Legislature; 2017–2019	Succeeded by Mike Hilgers
