= Nebraska Public Service Commission =

Public utility commission in Nebraska, USA

Agency overview
- Formed: 1906
- Jurisdiction: Nebraska
- Headquarters: Lincoln, Nebraska
- Agency executives: Tim Schram, Chair; Kevin Stocker, Vice Chair
- Website: psc.nebraska.gov

The Nebraska Public Service Commission regulates railroads, household goods and passenger carriers, telephone companies, grain warehouses and construction of manufactured housing.

== History ==
The first iteration of the Public Service Commission was established as a statutory body in 1885, when the legislature established the Board of Railway Commissioners, which consisted of the Attorney General, Secretary of State, and Auditor of Public Records. In 1887, the legislature abolished the Board and reconstructed it as the Board of Transportation. The Board consisted of the Attorney General, Secretary of State, Auditor of Public Accounts, Treasurer, and Commissioner of Public Lands and Buildings and was responsible for regulating the railroad industry. In 1884 and 1896, the legislature attempted to create a railway commission as a constitutional entity, but the amendments were not ratified by the voters because too many voters abstained from casting ballots on the amendments.

In 1901, after previously holding that the Board of Transportation's existence did not violate the state constitution, the Nebraska Supreme Court struck down the 1887 law creating it, concluding that the law did not comply with the constitution's legislative process.

In 1906, voters ratified a constitutional amendment establishing the Railway Commission, and simultaneously elected three members to serve as the first commissioners. The Commission originally consisted of three members who were elected to six-year terms at statewide elections, with one commissioner's term expiring at every general election. In 1962, voters approved an amendment that allowed the legislature to expand the size of the Commission to up to seven members and mandated the election of the Commission by districts drawn by the legislature. The Nebraska Legislature established the commission as a five-member body and drew the first set of districts, which have been redrawn every ten years following the federal census. The name of the Commission was changed to the Public Service Commission in 1972 with the ratification of another constitutional amendment.

== Commissioners ==
The commissioners are elected in partisan elections from districts drawn by the Nebraska Legislature for six-year terms. Following the 2023 appointment of Christian Mirch, all members of the Commission are Republicans.

District	Name	Party	Start	Next Election
1	Dan Watermeier	Republican	January 9, 2019	2030
2	Christian Mirch	Republican	January 27, 2023 (appointed)	2026 (retiring)
3	Tim Schram, Chair	Republican	January 7, 2007	2030
4	Eric Kamler	Republican	January 5, 2023	2028
5	Kevin Stocker, Vice Chair	Republican	January 5, 2023	2028

== See also ==
- 2026 Nebraska Public Service Commission election
- Elections in Nebraska
- 2026 United States elections
- 2024 Nebraska elections#Public Service Commission
