= Nebraska Legislature 34th district =

American legislative district

Nebraska's 34th legislative district
- Map of Nebraska Legislature districts with the 34th district shaded in red
Senator
Loren Lippincott; R–Central City
since 2023
- Demographics: 89% White; 0.9% Black; 8.4% Hispanic; 0.8% Asian; 0.6% Native American
- Population (2020): 38,230

The Nebraska Legislature's 34th district is one of the 49 legislative districts in the Nebraska Legislature. The district is located in south-central Nebraska and covers Hamilton, Merrick, Nance, and part of Hall counties. The area of Hall County it includes encircles Grand Island and includes some of its outlying areas. Notable settlements in the area include Aurora, Central City, Fullerton, Genoa, and Palmer. Loren Lippincott has represented the district since 2023.

== Demographics ==
The US Census Bureau recorded the population as of 2020 at 38,230.

- 89% of the district is White.
- 8.4% of the district is Hispanic.
- 0.9% of the district is Black.
- 0.8% of the district is Asian.
- 0.6% of the district is Native American.

== List of representatives ==
Representative	Party	Years of service	Legislature	Residence
Loren Lippincott	Republican	2023 - present	108th-109th	Central City
Curt Friesen	Republican	2015-2023	104th-107th	Henderson
Annette Dubas	Republican	2007-2015	100th-103rd	Fullerton
Robert Kremer	Republican	1999-2007	96th-99th	Aurora
Jerry Willhoft	Democratic	1997-1999	95th	Central City
Janis McKenzie	Democratic	1993-1997*	93rd-94th	Harvard
Rod Johnson	Republican	1983-1992*	88th-92nd	Sutton
Maurice Kremer	Republican	1965-1983	75th-87th	Aurora
Richard Lysinger	Republican	1963-1965	74th	Ravenna

- Rod Johnson resigned before his term ended. Janis McKenzie was appointed to fill the vacancy.
- Janis McKenzie resigned before her term ended. Jerry Willhoft was appointed to fill the vacancy.
