= Nebraska Highway 66 =

State highway in Nebraska, U.S.

State Highway 66
- N-66 highlighted in red

Route information
- Maintained by NDOT
- Length: 83.55 mi (134.46 km)

Western segment
- Length: 21.01 mi (33.81 km)
- West end: N-14 south of Central City
- East end: US 81 south of Stromsburg

Middle segment
- Length: 14.03 mi (22.58 km)
- West end: N-15 west of Dwight
- East end: N-79 in Valparaiso

Eastern segment
- Length: 35.34 mi (56.87 km)
- West end: US 77 south of Wahoo
- Major intersections: US 6 in Ashland; I-80 southeast of Ashland; N-50 southwest of Louisville
- East end: Main Street in Louisville

Far eastern segment
- Length: 13.17 mi (21.20 km)
- West end: Walnut Street in Louisville
- East end: US 34 / US 75 west of Plattsmouth

Location
- Country: United States
- State: Nebraska
- Counties: Western segment: Hamilton, Polk; Middle segment: Butler, Saunders; Eastern segment: Saunders, Cass; Far eastern segment: Cass

Highway system
- Nebraska State Highway System; Interstate; US; State; Link; Spur; State Spurs; Recreation
← N-65	→ N-67

Nebraska Highway 66 is a highway in central and eastern Nebraska. It is a discontinuous highway with four segments heading in a west-to-east direction. The first segment begins at Nebraska Highway 14 south of Central City and ends at U.S. Highway 81 south of Stromsburg. The second segment begins at Nebraska Highway 15 west of Dwight and ends at Nebraska Highway 79 in Valparaiso. The third segment begins at U.S. Highway 77 south of Wahoo and ends at Main Street in Louisville. The fourth and final segment begins at the intersection with Walnut Street and Koop Avenue in Louisville, and ends at U.S. Highway 34 and U.S. Highway 75 west of Plattsmouth.

== Route description ==
=== Western segment ===
Nebraska Highway 66 begins at an intersection with NE 14 south of Central City. It heads eastward through farmland, passing through Hordville and Polk along the way. South of Stromsburg, it meets US 81 where the western segment terminates. The next segment begins about 26 miles (42 km) to the east of this point.

=== Middle segment ===
The middle segment of Nebraska Highway 66 begins at NE 15 west of Dwight. It continues in an eastward direction through farmland before ending at NE 79 in Valparaiso. The next segment picks up just over 15 miles (24 km) to the east of Valparaiso.

=== Eastern segment ===
The eastern segment of N-66 starts at an intersection with US 77 south of Wahoo. It again continues eastward and to the southeast into farmland, passing near the communities of Ithaca and Memphis. To the southeast, it enters Ashland where the highway will intersect with US 6. Continuing to the southeast, N-66 intersects I-80 at exit 426. The highway continues eastward, passing through South Bend and heading to the southeast. Southwest of Louisville, the route intersects with NE 50 and runs concurrently northward with it for just over a mile. Upon entering Louisville, N-66 splits off to the east. At Main Street near Mill Creek, this segment ends, as there is no bridge crossing over the creek. The highway resumes 0.13 miles (0.21 km) to the east.

=== Far eastern segment ===
Still in Louisville, the far eastern segment of N-66 starts at the intersection with Koop Avenue and Walnut Street. It continues eastward, exiting Louisville and entering farmland. Further to the east, the highway intersects with US 34 and US 75 just west of Plattsmouth. At this point, the highway ends.

== History ==
Prior to October 24, 2005, the segment of Nebraska Highway 66 between U.S. Highway 77 south of Wahoo and U.S. Highway 6 in Ashland was designated as Nebraska Highway 63. On that day, this segment was renumbered to the present designation of NE 66.

== Major intersections ==
County	Location	mi	km	Destinations	Notes
Hamilton	Overland	0.00	0.00	N-14 (Broadway Street) – Aurora, Central City	Western terminus
Polk		21.01	33.81	US 81 (Center Road)	Eastern terminus of western segment; road continues as County Road 123
Gap in route
Butler		47.01	75.66	N-15 (Road O) / S-12C west (Road 23) – Ulysses, Seward, David City	Western terminus of middle segment; road continues as S-12C
Butler		51.00	82.08	S-12D north (South Road) – Dwight	
Saunders	Valparaiso	61.04	98.23	N-79 – North Bend, Lincoln	Eastern terminus of middle segment; road continues as South Street
Saunders	Gap in route				
Saunders		76.24	122.70	US 77 – Lincoln, Wahoo	Western terminus of eastern segment; former northern terminus of N-63; road continues as County Road G
Saunders		81.17	130.63	S-78B north – Ithaca	
Saunders		90.35	145.40	S-78C west (Galena Street) – Memphis	
Saunders	Ashland	97.44	156.81	US 6 (I-80 Alternate Route) to N-63 – Lincoln, Omaha	N-66 west of this point is former N-63 north; US 6 west is former N-63 south
Cass		101.30	163.03	I-80 – Lincoln, Omaha	I-80 exit 426
Cass	Louisville	109.89	176.85	N-50 south	West end of N-50 overlap
Cass	Louisville	111.24	179.02	N-50 north to N-66 east	East end of N-50 overlap
Cass	Louisville	111.58	179.57	Main Street	Eastern terminus of eastern segment
Cass	Louisville	Gap in route			
Cass	Louisville	111.71	179.78	Walnut Street to N-50 / N-66	Western terminus of far eastern segment
Cass		115.27	185.51	S-13H north (114th Street) – Cedar Creek	
Cass	Plattsmouth	124.88	200.97	US 34 / US 75 to I-29 – Omaha, Nebraska City	Eastern terminus; road continues as 8th Avenue (former US 34 east)
1.000 mi = 1.609 km; 1.000 km = 0.621 mi: Concurrency terminus
