= 2010 Nebraska elections =

Nebraska state elections in 2010 were held in the state of Nebraska on November 2, 2010. Nebraska electors voted for all three members representing the state in the United States House of Representatives; all statewide executive officers, including the Governor; half of the members of the Nebraska Legislature; seats on the Nebraska Public Service Commission, State Board of Education, and Board of Regents; members of the judiciary in retention elections; and several constitutional amendments.

== United States Congress ==
All three of Nebraska's seats in the United States House of Representatives were up for election in 2010. All three incumbents are Republican, and all three ran successfully ran for re-election.

United States House of Representatives elections in Nebraska, 2010
Party	Votes	Percentage	Seats	+/–
Republican	327,986	67.55%	3	—
Democratic	137,524	28.32%	0	—
Independents	20,036	4.13%	0	—
Totals	485,546	100.00%	3	—

== Governor and Lieutenant Governor ==
Incumbent Republican Governor Dave Heineman ran for a second full term as Governor. He handily won the Republican primary and was originally set to face Democratic nominee Mark Lakers, an investment banker, in the general election. However, Lakers dropped out of the race following a campaign finance scandal and was replaced with attorney Mike Meister. Heineman defeated Meister in the general election with 74% of the vote.

2010 Nebraska gubernatorial election
Party	Candidate	Votes	%	±%
Republican	Dave Heineman (inc.)	360,645	73.90%	+0.50%
Democratic	Mike Meister	127,343	26.10%	+1.64%
Majority		233,302	47.81%	−1.13%
Total votes		174,888	100.00	
Republican hold				

== Secretary of State ==
Incumbent Republican Secretary of State John A. Gale ran for re-election to a third full term. He was challenged in the general election by Fremont attorney Janet Stewart, whom he defeated in a landslide.

=== Republican primary ===
==== Candidates ====
- John A. Gale, incumbent Secretary of State

==== Results ====
Republican primary results
Party	Candidate	Votes	%
Republican	John A. Gale (inc.)	139,824	100.00%
Total votes		139,824	100.00%

=== Democratic primary ===
==== Candidates ====
- Janet Stewart, Fremont attorney

==== Results ====
Democratic primary results
Party	Candidate	Votes	%
Democratic	Janet Stewart	57,583	100.00%
Total votes		57,583	100.00%

=== General election ===
2010 Nebraska Secretary of State election
Party	Candidate	Votes	%	±%
Republican	John A. Gale (inc.)	326,431	69.75%	+8.43%
Democratic	Janet Stewart	141,564	30.25%	−3.34%
Majority		184,867	39.50%	+11.77%
Turnout		467,995		
Republican hold				

Results by county Gale: 50–60%; 60–70%; 70–80%; 80–90%; 90–100%

== Auditor of Public Accounts ==
Incumbent Republican State Auditor Mike Foley ran for re-election to a second consecutive term. He faced no major-party opposition and defeated Libertarian nominee Michele Sallach-Grace in the general election by a wide margin.

=== Republican primary ===
==== Candidates ====
- Mike Foley, incumbent State Auditor

==== Results ====
Republican primary results
Party	Candidate	Votes	%
Republican	Mike Foley	137,544	100.00%
Total votes		137,544	100.00%

=== General election ===
2010 Nebraska Auditor of Public Accounts election
Party	Candidate	Votes	%	±%
Republican	Mike Foley (inc.)	345,436	79.62%	+26.30%
Libertarian	Michele Sallach-Grace	88,433	20.38%	—
Majority		257,003	59.24%	+45.22%
Turnout		433,869		
Republican hold				

Results by county Foley: 70–80%; 80–90%; 90–100%

== State Treasurer ==
Incumbent Republican State Treasurer Shane Osborn declined to seek re-election to a second term. Former Attorney General Don Stenberg won the Republican nomination to succeed him. In the general election, he faced Democratic nominee Mark Stoj, a branch manager for a credit union. Stenberg won the election in a landslide.

=== Republican primary ===
Stenberg entered the race with high name recognition from his past service as Attorney General and several unsuccessful runs for the United States Senate. He was challenged by State Senator Tony Fulton, who emphasized the "fresh perspective" and "new energy" he would bring to the office, and former State Patrol Superintendent Tom Nesbitt, who argued that he was an experienced, non-partisan administrator. Stenberg ultimately won the primary by a wide margin and advanced to the general election.

==== Candidates ====
- Don Stenberg, former Attorney General
- Tony Fulton, State Senator
- Tom Nesbitt, former Superintendent of the Nebraska State Patrol

==== Results ====
Republican primary results
Party	Candidate	Votes	%
Republican	Don Stenberg	83,461	45.43%
Republican	Tony Fulton	44,771	24.38%
Republican	Tom Nesbitt	32,979	17.94%
Total votes		183,211	100.00%

=== Democratic primary ===
==== Candidates ====
- Mark Stoj, credit union branch manager

==== Results ====
Democratic primary results
Party	Candidate	Votes	%
Democratic	Mark Stoj	54,981	100.00%
Total votes		54,981	100.00%

=== General election ===
2010 Nebraska State Treasurer election
Party	Candidate	Votes	%	±%
Republican	Don Stenberg	345,661	72.94%	−3.35%
Democratic	Mark Stoj	128,231	27.06%	+3.35%
Majority		217,430	45.88%	−6.69%
Turnout		473,892		
Republican hold				

Results by county Stenberg: 60–70%; 70–80%; 80–90%; 90–100%

== Attorney General ==
Incumbent Republican Attorney General Jon Bruning ran for re-election to a third term. He faced no opposition in the primary or general election and was re-elected uncontested.

=== Republican primary ===
==== Candidates ====
- Jon Bruning, incumbent Attorney General

==== Results ====
Republican primary results
Party	Candidate	Votes	%
Republican	Jon Bruning (inc.)	148,746	100.00%
Total votes		148,746	100.00%

=== General election ===
2010 Nebraska Attorney General election
Party	Candidate	Votes	%
Republican	Jon Bruning (inc.)	393,124	100.00%
Total votes		393,124	100.00%
Republican hold			

Results by county Bruning: 90–100%

== Public Service Commission ==
=== District 4 ===
==== Republican primary ====
Incumbent Public Service Commissioner Rod Johnson ran for re-election to a fourth term. He was challenged in the Republican primary by Nebraska Party founder Paul A. Rosberg and Webster County Commissioner Roger L. Bohrer. Johnson campaigned on his experience in dealing with the issues that the commission faces, including "E911 enhancement; continued statewide broadband deployment; affordable natural gas rates and services; and maintaining sound financial grain warehouses." Rosberg emphasized that he was "not a politician, but a Christian statesman," and stressed the importance of ensuring "that the average person gets representation as to utility bill costs." Bohrer argued that his background as a businessman and local government official positioned him as "the only true candidate in this race with the passion for the citizens of this great state." Johnson ultimately won the primary by a wide margin, and advanced to the general election, where he was re-elected unopposed.

===== Candidates =====
- Rod Johnson
- Paul A. Rosberg, founder of the Nebraska Party
- Roger L. Bohrer, Webster County Commissioner

===== Results =====
Republican primary results
Party	Candidate	Votes	%
Republican	Rod Johnson (inc.)	14,704	49.45%
Republican	Paul A. Rosberg	7,090	23.85%
Republican	Roger L. Bohrer	5,683	19.11%
Total votes		27,477	100.00%

==== General election ====
2010 District 4 election
Party	Candidate	Votes	%
Republican	Rod Johnson (inc.)	72,377	100.00%
Total votes		72,377	100.00%
Republican hold			

=== District 5 ===
==== Republican primary ====
Incumbent Public Service Commissioner Jerry Vap ran for re-election to a second full term. He faced a crowded Republican primary, with five challengers running against him. Vap campaigned on his experience, pointing to his work in providing for enhanced 911 services, broadband availability, and expanding telehealth. Vap won renomination with a 32% plurality and was unopposed in the general election.

===== Candidates =====
- Jerry Vap, incumbent Commissioner
- Kelly Renee Rosberg, 2002 Nebraska Party nominee for Auditor
- Justin Jensen, former department store manager
- Christopher VanWinkle
- Mike Delka, 1998 candidate for the Public Service Commission, Chairman of the Webster County Republican Party
- Duane Dufek

===== Results =====
Republican primary results
Party	Candidate	Votes	%
Republican	Jerry Vap (inc.)	14,037	31.64%
Republican	Kelly Renee Rosberg	6,994	15.77%
Republican	Justin Jensen	4,617	10.41%
Republican	Christopher VanWinkle	4,217	9.51%
Republican	Mike Delka	3,357	7.57%
Republican	Duane Dufek	2,191	4.94%
Total votes		44,413	100.00%

==== General election ====
2010 District 5 election
Party	Candidate	Votes	%
Republican	Jerry Vap (inc.)	82,588	100.00%
Total votes		82,588	100.00%
Republican hold			

== State Board of Education ==
=== District 5 ===
Incumbent Board member Patricia H. Timm was unopposed for re-election.

==== Candidates ====
- Patricia H. Timm, incumbent Board member

==== Primary election results ====
Nonpartisan primary results
Party	Candidate	Votes	%
Nonpartisan	Patricia H. Timm (inc.)	27,500	100.00%
Total votes		27,500	100.00%

==== General election results ====
Nonpartisan general results
Party	Candidate	Votes	%
Nonpartisan	Patricia H. Timm (inc.)	41,186	100.00%
Total votes		41,186	100.00%

=== District 6 ===
Incumbent Board member Fred Meyer declined to seek re-election, and he was succeeded by Grand Island Public School Board member Lynn R. Cronk, who defeated Randy P. Klawitter by a wide margin.

==== Candidates ====
- Lynn R. Cronk, Grand Island Public School Board member
- Randy P. Klawitter

==== Primary election results ====
Nonpartisan primary results
Party	Candidate	Votes	%
Nonpartisan	Lynn R. Cronk	18,112	65.65%
Nonpartisan	Randy P. Klawitter	9,477	34.35%
Total votes		27,589	100.00%

==== General election results ====
Nonpartisan general results
Party	Candidate	Votes	%
Nonpartisan	Lynn R. Cronk	28,990	66.17%
Nonpartisan	Randy P. Klawitter	14,825	33.83%
Total votes		43,815	100.00%

=== District 7 ===
Incumbent Board member Kandy Imes declined to seek re-election. Cindi Allen, a member of the Ogallala Public School Board, and Molly O'Holleran, a member of the North Platte Public School Board, ran to succeed her. Allen narrowly placed first in the nonpartisan primary, but in the general election, O'Holleran defeated her by a wide margin.

==== Candidates ====
- Molly O'Holleran, North Platte Public School Board member
- Cindi Allen, Ogallala Public School Board member

==== Primary election results ====
Nonpartisan primary results
Party	Candidate	Votes	%
Nonpartisan	Cindi Allen	16,226	52.55%
Nonpartisan	Molly O'Holleran	14,652	47.45%
Total votes		30,878	100.00%

==== General election results ====
Nonpartisan general results
Party	Candidate	Votes	%
Nonpartisan	Molly O'Holleran	31,676	60.11%
Nonpartisan	Cindi Allen	21,035	39.89%
Total votes		52,711	100.00%

=== District 8 ===
Incumbent Board member Joe Higgins declined to seek re-election. Businessman John Sieler and retired teacher and administrator Dennis McIntyre ran to replace him. Though the race was formally nonpartisan, Sieler ran as a conservative with the endorsement of Republican Governor Dave Heineman. McIntyre, meanwhile, won the endorsement of the Omaha World-Herald, which praised him for having a "far broader and deeper understanding" of public education issues than Sieler. Ultimately, Sieler narrowly defeated McIntyre.

==== Candidates ====
- John Sieler, Omaha businessman
- Dennis McIntyre, retired high school social studies teacher

==== Primary election results ====
Nonpartisan primary results
Party	Candidate	Votes	%
Nonpartisan	Dennis McIntyre	7,824	53.58%
Nonpartisan	John Sieler	6,786	46.42%
Total votes		14,610	100.00%

==== General election results ====
Nonpartisan general results
Party	Candidate	Votes	%
Nonpartisan	John Sieler	23,139	50.60%
Nonpartisan	Dennis McIntyre	22,585	49.40%
Total votes		45,724	100.00%

== Board of Regents ==
=== District 6 ===
Incumbent Regent Kent Schroeder was unopposed for re-election.

==== Candidates ====
- Kent Schroeder, incumbent Board member

==== Primary election results ====
Nonpartisan primary results
Party	Candidate	Votes	%
Nonpartisan	Kent Schroeder	27,900	100.00%
Total votes		27,900	100.00%

==== General election results ====
Nonpartisan general results
Party	Candidate	Votes	%
Nonpartisan	Kent Schroeder	43,647	100.00%
Total votes		43,647	100.00%

=== District 7 ===
Incumbent Regent Bob Phares, who was appointed in 2006 following the impeachment and removal of Regent David Hergert, ran for re-election to a full term. He was challenged by Frank B. Svoboda, who had previously served as the Keith County Attorney, a district court judge, and a director of the Upper Republican Natural Resources District. Svoboda placed first in the primary, but Phares ultimately defeated him with 55% of the vote.

==== Candidates ====
- Bob Phares, incumbent Regent
- Frank B. Svoboda, former Keith County Attorney

==== Primary election results ====
Nonpartisan primary results
Party	Candidate	Votes	%
Nonpartisan	Frank B. Svoboda	18,890	58.84%
Nonpartisan	Bob Phares (inc.)	13,213	41.16%
Total votes		32,103	100.00%

==== General election results ====
Nonpartisan general results
Party	Candidate	Votes	%
Nonpartisan	Bob Phares (inc.)	27,564	54.53%
Nonpartisan	Frank B. Svoboda	22,975	45.47%
Total votes		50,539	100.00%
