= Senator McKenzie =

Senator McKenzie may refer to:

- Andy McKenzie (politician) (born 1970), West Virginia State Senate
- Bridget McKenzie (born 1969), Senator for Victoria in the Parliament of Australia
- Curt McKenzie (born 1969), Idaho State Senate
- Henry McKenzie (1882–1974), Florida State Senate
- Janis Johnson McKenzie (born 1955), Nebraska State Senate
- John C. McKenzie (1860–1941), Illinois State Senate
- Lewis H. McKenzie (1926–1999), Georgia State Senate

== See also ==
- Ronald MacKenzie (born 1934), Massachusetts State Senate
