= Maurice Kremer (politician) =

American politician (1907–1990)

Member of the Nebraska Legislature
- In office January 1, 1963 – January 5, 1983
- Preceded by: Hans Jensen
- Succeeded by: Rod Johnson
- Constituency: 25th district (1963–1965); 34th district (1965–1983)

Personal details
- Born: August 31, 1907 Milford, Nebraska
- Died: February 10, 1990 (aged 82) Hastings, Nebraska
- Party: Republican
- Spouse: Alice M. Troyer (m. 1932)
- Children: 4 (Kenneth, Bob, Arys, Beth)
- Occupation: Farmer, businessman

Maurice Kremer (August 31, 1907 – February 10, 1990) was a Republican politician from Nebraska who served as a member of the Nebraska Legislature from 1963 to 1983.

== Early life ==
Kremer was born in Milford, Nebraska, in 1907, and graduated from Aurora High School. He attended the University of Nebraska over the course of two winter semesters to take a farm operator's course. Kremer established a farm in Aurora, and pioneered water and soil conservation techniques in Nebraska, including by establishing a state database for soil and water data.

== Nebraska Legislature ==
In 1961, State Senator Hans Jensen resigned from the legislature to become a consultant in the U.S. Department of Agriculture's Agricultural Stabilization and Conservation Service. Governor Frank B. Morrison did not fill the vacancy caused by Jensen's resignation, and Kremer ran to succeed him in 1962. In the nonpartisan primary, Kremer faced former Clay County Supervisor Parker W. Aker, Farm Bureau official Walter Beck, businessman Albert Boom, farmer Cloyde Mankin. Kremer placed first in the primary election, winning 37 percent of the vote, and advanced to the general election with Berck, who placed second with 20 percent of the vote. Kremer defeated Berck by a wide margin, winning 58 percent to Berck's 42 percent.

After redistricting took place in 1964, Kremer opted to run for re-election in the newly created 34th district, and ran against fellow State Senator Ted Reeves. Kremer placed first over Reeves in the primary election, receiving 56 percent of the vote to Reeves's 44 percent, and defeated him by a wide margin in the general election, winning 57–43 percent.

In 1966, Kremer ran for re-election to a third term. He was challenged by George McCormick, a farmer and Union Pacific employee, and Franz Penner, a former farmer and University of Nebraska–Lincoln student. Kremer placed first in the primary by a wide margin, receiving 68 percent of the vote to Penner's 17 percent and McCormick's 15 percent. He advanced to the general election with Penner, and won in a landslide, receiving 73 percent of the vote to Penner's 27 percent.

Kremer was re-elected without opposition in 1970 and 1974.

In 1978, Kremer ran for re-election to a sixth term. He was challenged by Maynard Jensen, a farmer and president of the Nebraska Agricultural Council. Jensen, a friend of Kremer's, agreed with him on most of the issues, and was speculated to be "building his name recognition for a repeat bid in 1982" rather than meaningfully contesting the race. Kremer placed first in the primary election by a wide margin, winning 64 percent of the vote to Jensen's 36 percent. In the general election, Kremer defeated Jensen with 60 percent of the vote.

Kremer declined to seek re-election in 1982.

== Death and legacy ==
Kremer died on February 10, 1990. In 1998, his son, Bob Kremer, was elected to the 34th district, serving from 1999 to 2007.
