= Jerry Vap =

Nebraska Public Service Commission member (born 1940)

Member of the Nebraska Public Service Commission from the 5th district
- In office August 7, 2001 – January 5, 2017
- Preceded by: Dan Urwiller
- Succeeded by: Mary Ridder

Personal details
- Born: November 9, 1940 (age 85) McCook, Nebraska
- Party: Republican
- Spouse: Sherry Brant
- Children: 3
- Education: University of Nebraska (B.S.)

Gerald L. Vap (born November 9, 1940) is a Republican politician who served as a member of the Nebraska Public Service Commission from 2001 to 2017.

== Early career ==
Vap was born in McCook, Nebraska, and graduated from McCook High School in 1958. He attended the University of Nebraska, receiving his bachelor's degree in business administration in 1962. He owned and operated Vap's Seed and Hardware in McCook, and served on the Middle Republican Natural Resources District board of directors from 1972 to 2001. While serving on the board, Vap also served as the president of the Nebraska Association of Resources Districts and the president of the National Association of Conservation Districts.

== Nebraska Public Service Commission ==
In 2001, Public Service Commissioner Dan Urwiller resigned from office following allegations that he had misused state resources. Governor Mike Johanns appointed Vap as Urwiller's successor, and he was sworn in on August 7, 2001.

Vap ran for re-election in 2004. He won the Republican primary unopposed, and was challenged by Nebraska Party nominee Anna Rosberg in the general election. Vap won re-election in a landslide, receiving 68 percent of the vote to Rosberg's 32 percent.

In 2010, Vap ran for re-election to a second full term. He was challenged by five opponents in the Republican primary. He won the primary with a small plurality, receiving 32 percent of the vote. In the general election, Vap was re-elected unopposed.

Vap sought re-election to a third full term in 2016, and was challenged by rancher Mary Ridder in the Republican primary. Ridder led Vap on election night by 57 votes, which was reduced to 36 votes after the election results were certified, which prompted a recount. The recount ultimately confirmed that Vap had lost renomination by 46 votes.

== Personal life ==
He and his wife Sherry have three children.
