= Curt Friesen =

American politician

Member of the Nebraska Legislature from the 34th district
- In office January 7, 2015 – January 4, 2023
- Preceded by: Annette Dubas
- Succeeded by: Loren Lippincott

Personal details
- Born: July 13, 1955 (age 71)
- Party: Republican
- Occupation: Farmer

Curt Friesen (born July 13, 1955) is a politician from the state of Nebraska in the Midwestern United States. In 2006, he unsuccessfully ran for a seat in the Nebraska Legislature. In 2014, he was elected to the legislature, representing a central portion of the state. Friesen is a member of the Republican Party.

== Early life ==
Friesen was born July 13, 1955, in Henderson, Nebraska. He graduated from Henderson Community School in 1973, then attended Southeast Community College in Milford, Nebraska, obtaining an associate degree in diesel technology in 1975. In about 1976, he began farming in Hamilton County, where he raised corn and soybeans.

== Early political career ==
Early in Friesen's farming career, he found himself in difficulties with U.S. Department of Agriculture (USDA) regulations. He sought assistance from Virginia Smith, who represented Nebraska's Third District in the U.S. House of Representatives. Smith's office contacted USDA officials, and the regulation in question was changed. According to Friesen, this experience resolved him to involve himself in politics rather than being "the person complaining in the coffee shop".

From 1997 to 2008, Friesen served on the board of directors of the Upper Big Blue Natural Resources District, a local governmental body charged with managing ground and surface water and with preventing soil erosion in the upper portion of the Big Blue River basin. For the last two of these years, he was the board's chairman. From 2000 through 2004, he was the mayor of Henderson; he sought re-election in 2004, but was defeated. In 2008, he was appointed as one of nine directors of the Nebraska Corn Board, which manages funds raised by a half-cent-per-bushel checkoff for research, education, market development, and promotion of Nebraska corn; he served two three-year terms, until 2014.

== Nebraska Legislature ==
=== 2006 election ===
In November 2005, Friesen announced his intention of running in the next year's election for the Nebraska Legislature from the 24th District, which consisted of York, Seward, and part of Polk County. Incumbent Elaine Stuhr, a member of the Republican Party, was barred by Nebraska's term-limits law from running for re-election.

Friesen, a Republican, was one of four candidates in the race. Greg Adams, a Republican, was a high-school teacher and the current mayor of York. Jim Ruby, a Republican from Seward, had served as the Seward County attorney from 1999 to 2003. Larry TeSelle had sold cars in Seward and Milford for 30 years; at the time of the election, he was a maintenance worker for Union Bank in Lincoln.

In the nonpartisan primary, Adams received 4055 votes, or 42.8% of the 9474 votes cast. Friesen placed second, with 3593 votes, or 37.9%. Ruby and TeSelle received 1202 votes (12.7%) and 624 votes (6.6%) respectively.

As the top two vote-getters in the primary, Adams and Friesen moved on to the general election. Over the entire course of the election, the Adams campaign was one of the top fundraisers among the southeastern Nebraska legislative races, raising $68,000 and spending $54,000; the Friesen campaign raised $34,000 and spent the same. Several of the largest institutional contributors gave money to both campaigns: the Nebraska Chamber of Commerce and Industry gave $3000 to Adams and $1500 to Friesen; the Nebraska Bankers gave $3600 to Adams and $1250 to Friesen; the Associated General Contractors Highway Improvement PAC gave $3500 to Adams and $500 to Friesen. The Nebraska Realtors gave $1500 to Adams and nothing to Friesen; Central Nebraska Wood Preservers of Sutton, Nebraska, gave Friesen $2000 and Adams nothing.

When the November election was held, Adams received 6088 votes, or 50.8% of the 11,979 votes cast; Friesen received 5891 votes, or 49.2%.

=== 2014 election ===
In August 2013, Friesen announced that he would make a second bid for a seat in the Nebraska legislature. On this occasion, he ran from the 34th District, which encompassed Nance, Merrick, Hamilton, and part of Hall Counties, including the cities of Fullerton, Central City, Aurora, and part of Grand Island. The incumbent, Annette Dubas, a member of the Democratic Party, was barred by Nebraska's term-limits law from running for a third consecutive term.

Friesen ran unopposed in the 2014 election. He raised over $35,000 for the campaign, and spent $7600. Major contributors included the Nebraska Realtors, which supplied $3000; the Nebraska Bankers PAC and the Nebraska Optometric Association, each of which contributed $2000; and the Associated General Contractors Highway Improvement PAC, which furnished $1750.

=== Legislative tenure ===
==== 2015 session ====
In the 2015 session of the legislature, Friesen was named vice-chair of the Natural Resources Committee; he was also appointed to the Transportation and Telecommunications Committee.

== Personal life ==
In 1975, Friesen married Nancy Vaught; they have four children.
