= Nebraska Highway 79 =

State highway in Nebraska, U.S.

State Highway 79
- N-79 highlighted in red

Route information
- Maintained by NDOT
- Length: 60.36 mi (97.14 km)
- Existed: 1934–present

Major junctions
- South end: US 34 northwest of Lincoln
- N-92 west of Weston; US 30 in North Bend
- North end: N-91 in Snyder

Location
- Country: United States
- State: Nebraska
- Counties: Lancaster, Saunders, Dodge

Highway system
- Nebraska State Highway System; Interstate; US; State; Link; Spur; State Spurs; Recreation
← N-78	→ I-80

Nebraska Highway 79 is a highway in eastern Nebraska. It is a north–south highway which has a length of 60.28 miles (97.01 km). The southern terminus of Highway 79 is northwest of Lincoln near Lincoln Airport at U.S. Highway 34. The northern terminus of Highway 79 is in Snyder.

== Route description ==
Nebraska Highway 79 begins northwest of Lincoln near Lincoln Municipal Airport at U.S. 34. The highway goes north into farmland, then northwest and meets Nebraska Highway 66 in Valparaiso. It goes north until meeting Nebraska Highway 92, with which it runs east concurrently for one mile (1.6 km). It turns north and passes through Prague. It continues north, turns east briefly, then turns north to enter Morse Bluff. It then crosses the Platte River and enters North Bend, where it intersects U.S. Highway 30. It continues north from North Bend, then ends at Nebraska Highway 91 in Snyder.

== Major intersections ==
County	Location	mi	km	Destinations	Notes
Lancaster		0.00	0.00	US 34 (W. Alvo Road/Purple Heart Highway)	
Lancaster	Raymond	5.03	8.10	S-55J east (W. Raymond Road)	
Saunders	Valparaiso	13.49	21.71	N-66 west	
Saunders		22.53	36.26	N-92 west	Southern end of N-92 overlap
Saunders		23.55	37.90	N-92 east	Northern end of N-92 overlap
Dodge	North Bend	43.22	69.56	US 30 (6th Street)	
Dodge	Snyder	60.36	97.14	N-91 (4th Street)	
1.000 mi = 1.609 km; 1.000 km = 0.621 mi: Concurrency terminus
