= Nebraska Highway 63 =

State highway in Nebraska, U.S.

State Highway 63
- 238th Street
- N-63 highlighted in red

Route information
- Maintained by NDOT
- Length: 13.96 mi (22.47 km)
- Existed: 1936–present

Major junctions
- South end: US 34 east of Eagle
- I-80 east of Greenwood
- North end: US 6 southwest of Ashland

Location
- Country: United States
- State: Nebraska
- Counties: Cass

Highway system
- Nebraska State Highway System; Interstate; US; State; Link; Spur; State Spurs; Recreation
← N-62	→ N-64

Nebraska Highway 63 is a north–south highway in eastern Nebraska with a length of 13.93 miles (22.42 km). It is also known throughout Cass County as 238th Street, except in the village of Alvo, where it adopts the name Russell Street. Its southern terminus is at U.S. Highway 34 east of Eagle. Its northern terminus is at U.S. Highway 6 southwest of Ashland.

== Route description ==
Nebraska Highway 63 begins at US 34 east of Eagle. It goes north into farmland through Alvo before intersecting Interstate 80. It goes north towards Ashland before ending at US 6. Nebraska Highway 63 currently lies entirely in Cass County. Exit signage on Interstate 80 indicates the Nebraska Highway 63 exit as the exit for Ashland and Greenwood.

== History ==
Prior to October 24, 2005, Nebraska Highway 63 extended north from its present terminus on a concurrency with U.S. Highway 6 to Ashland. At Ashland, it turned north, and followed a highway which went north and west near the villages of Memphis and Ithaca, eventually terminating at U.S. Highway 77 south of Wahoo. On that day, that part of the highway was renumbered as Nebraska Highway 66.

== Major intersections ==
The entire route is in Cass County.

Location	mi	km	Destinations	Notes
	0.00	0.00	US 34 – Union, Lincoln	Southern terminus; road continues as 238th Street
	10.97	17.65	I-80 – Lincoln, Omaha	I-80 exit 420
	13.96	22.47	US 6 (I-80 Alternate Route) – Greenwood, Ashland	Northern terminus; US 6 east is former N-63 north
1.000 mi = 1.609 km; 1.000 km = 0.621 mi
