= Annette Dubas =

American politician

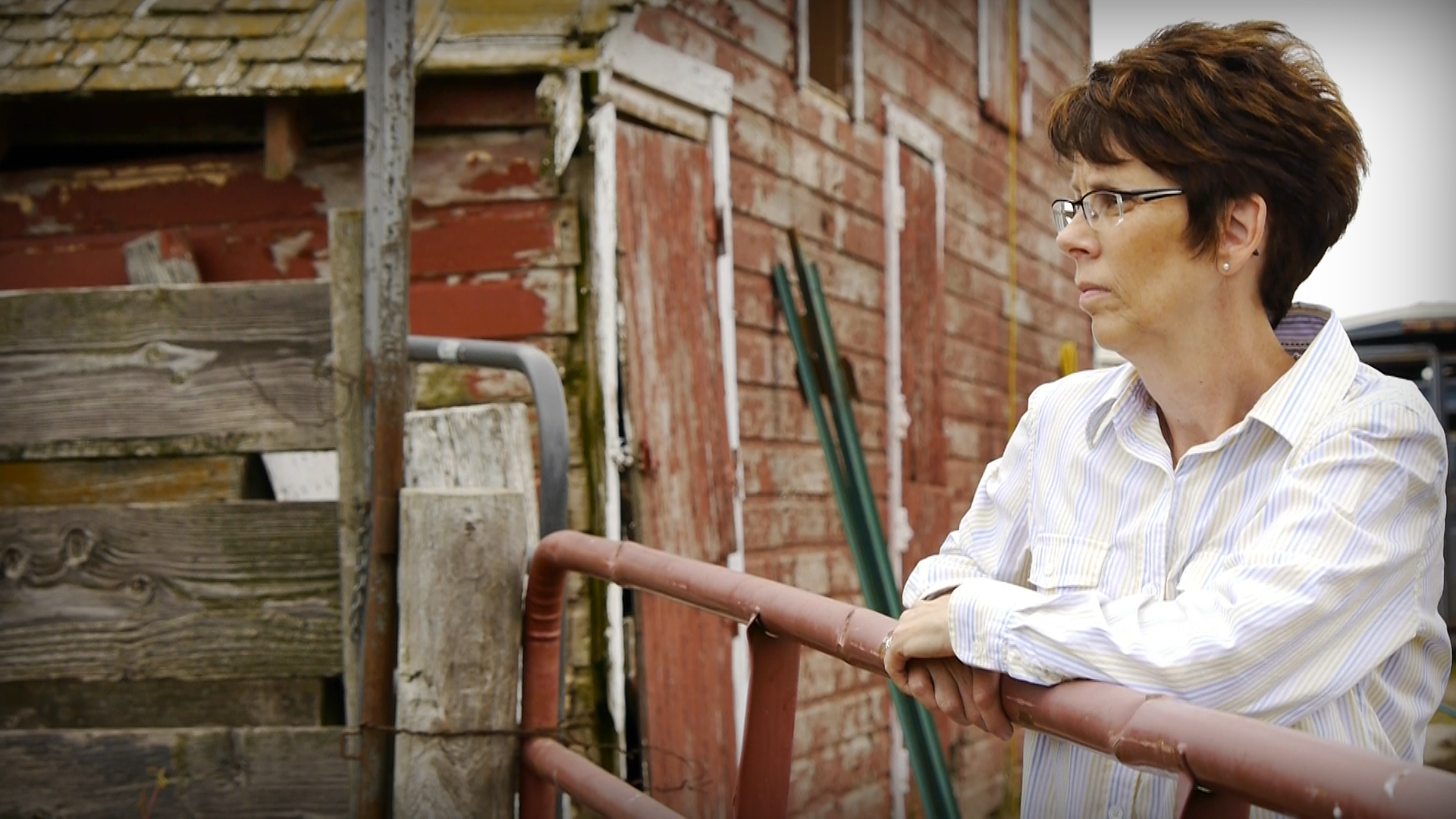
- Annette Dubas on her family farm.

Member of the Nebraska Legislature from the 34th district
- In office 2007–2015
- Preceded by: Bob Kremer
- Succeeded by: Curt Friesen

Personal details
- Born: February 5, 1956 (age 70) Omaha, Nebraska, U.S.
- Party: Democratic

Annette M. Dubas (born February 5, 1956) is a politician from the U.S. state of Nebraska, who served in the Nebraska Legislature from 2007 to 2015. She was a candidate in the 2014 Nebraska gubernatorial election, but withdrew in November 2013.

== Personal life ==
She was born on February 5, 1956, in Omaha, Nebraska, and graduated from Fullerton High School in 1974. She is married and has four children. She, her husband, and one of her sons operate a farm and ranch, raising corn, soybeans, wheat and alfalfa, as well as purebred Angus cattle. Prior to being elected to the State Legislature, Dubas served on the Fullerton Public School Board for ten years and chaired the Nance County Planning and Zoning Commission for six years.

== State legislature ==
She was elected in 2006 to represent the 34th Nebraska legislative district, which includes Hamilton, Merrick, and Nance, counties, as well as parts of Hall and Polk counties. Major communities in the district include Aurora, Fullerton, Central City, Doniphan, and small portions of Grand Island.

== Political positions ==
Dubas supports same-sex marriage.

== Gubernatorial candidacy ==
On September 22, 2013, Dubas launched her campaign for the 2014 Nebraska gubernatorial election. On November 25, she announced that she was withdrawing as a candidate, stating that "campaign life was taking its toll on me and my family".
