= 2016 Nebraska elections =

The 2016 Nebraska state elections were held on November 8, 2016. Voters elected all three of Nebraska’s representatives to the United States House of Representatives, along with half of the members of the Nebraska Legislature. Elections were also held for seats on the Nebraska Public Service Commission, State Board of Education, and Board of Regents. Additionally, judicial retention elections took place for the Nebraska Supreme Court, Court of Appeals, Workers' Compensation Court, and lower courts. Local district elections were also on the ballot, as was a referendum on repealing the state's death penalty.

== United States House of Representatives ==
All three of Nebraska's U.S. Representatives ran for re-election. Republicans Jeff Fortenberry and Adrian Smith successfully won re-election, but Democrat Brad Ashford was defeated for re-election.

District	Republican		Democratic		Others		Total		Result
District	Votes	%	Votes	%	Votes	%	Votes	%	Result
District 1	189,771	69.45%	83,467	30.55%	0	0.00%	273,238	100.0%	Republican hold
District 2	141,066	48.93%	137,602	47.73%	9,640	3.34%	288,308	100.0%	Republican gain
District 3	226,720	100.0%	0	0.00%	0	0.00%	226,720	100.0%	Republican hold
Total	557,557	70.74%	221,069	28.04%	9,640	1.22%	788,266	100.0%	

== Public Service Commission ==
=== District 4 ===
Incumbent Commissioner Rod Johnson ran for re-election. He was challenged in the Republican primary by Tammy Cheatum and Dakota Della, but defeated both easily, winning 64% of the vote. In the general election, Johnson faced no challenger and won uncontested.

==== Republican primary ====
===== Candidates =====
- Rod Johnson, incumbent Public Service Commissioner
- Tammy Cheatum, high school guidance counselor
- Dakota Delka, McCook farmer

===== Results =====
Republican primary results
Party	Candidate	Votes	%
Republican	Rod Johnson	24,009	63.72%
Republican	Tammy Cheatum	7,867	20.89%
Republican	Dakota Delka	4,972	13.19%
Total votes		36,848	100.00%

==== General election ====
2016 Nebraska Public Service Commission, District 4 election
Party	Candidate	Votes	%
Republican	Rod Johnson (inc.)	126,758	100.00%
Total votes		126,758	100.00%
Republican hold			

=== District 5 ===
Incumbent Public Service Commissioner Jerry Vap ran for re-election to another term. He was challenged in the Republican primary by rancher Mary Ridder. Vap campaigned for re-election on his experience, arguing that he was "the most qualified person to serve the citizens of Nebraska on the Public Service Commission," and pointed to his work in upgrading 911 services and expanding broadband internet coverage. Ridder, meanwhile, argued that she would bring a "valuable rural and landowner perspective" to the Commission. The race between Vap and Ridder was too close to call on election night, with Ridder in a slight lead, and produced an automatic recount, which confirmed that she defeated Vap for nomination by 46 votes. In the general election, Ridder faced no challenger and won unopposed.

==== Republican primary ====
===== Candidates =====
- Mary Ridder, rancher
- Jerry Vap, incumbent Public Service Commissioner

===== Results =====
Republican primary results
Party	Candidate	Votes	%
Republican	Mary Ridder	21,925	50.05%
Republican	Jerry Vap (inc.)	21,879	49.95%
Total votes		43,804	100.00%

==== General election ====
2016 Nebraska Public Service Commission, District 5 election
Party	Candidate	Votes	%
Republican	Mary Ridder	127,050	100.00%
Total votes		127,050	100.00%
Republican hold			

== State Board of Education ==
=== District 1 ===
Incumbent Board member Lillie Larsen declined to run for re-election in the 1st district, which included most of metropolitan Lincoln. Two retired educators—Stephanie Bohlke-Schulte and Patricia A. Koch Johns—ran against physician Bob Rauner. Though the race was formally nonpartisan, Bohlke-Schulte ran as a Republican, Koch Johns as a Democrat, and Rauner as a "nonpartisan." During the campaign, the candidates agreed on their opposition to charter schools and standardized testing, and the sharpest divide was over comprehensive sex education. Koch Johns and Rauner favored comprehensive sex education, while Bohlke-Schulte opposed it. Koch Johns and Bohlke-Schulte narrowly defeated Rauner to win first and second place in the nonpartisan primary, and advanced to the general election, where Koch Johns narrowly defeated Bohlke-Schulte, 52-48%, to win her first term on the Board.

==== Candidates ====
- Patricia A. Koch Johns, retired teacher
- Stephanie Bohlke-Schulte, retired school principal, former member of the Grand Island School Board
- Bob Rauner, physician

==== Primary election results ====
Nonpartisan primary results
Party	Candidate	Votes	%
Nonpartisan	Patricia A. Koch Johns	13,679	34.20%
Nonpartisan	Stephanie Bohlke-Schulte	13,330	33.31%
Nonpartisan	Bob Rauner	12,657	32.49%
Total votes		39,666	100.00%

==== General election results ====
Nonpartisan general results
Party	Candidate	Votes	%
Nonpartisan	Patricia A. Koch Johns	47,386	52.20%
Nonpartisan	Stephanie Bohlke-Schulte	43,378	47.80%
Total votes		90,764	100.00%

=== District 2 ===
Incumbent Board member Glen A. Flint, who was appointed to the Board in 2014 by then-Governor Dave Heineman, ran for re-election to a full term. He was challenged by teacher Lisa Fricke, who had the support of the Nebraska State Education Association. Though the race was formally nonpartisan, Flint ran as a Republican and Fricke as a Democrat. Fricke outpaced Flint in the nonpartisan primary and then defeated him in a landslide in the general election, winning 65% of the vote.

==== Candidates ====
- Lisa Fricke, teacher
- Glen A. Flint, incumbent Board member

==== Primary election results ====
Nonpartisan primary results
Party	Candidate	Votes	%
Nonpartisan	Lisa Fricke	16,324	60.20%
Nonpartisan	Glen A. Flint	10,786	39.80%
Total votes		27,110	100.00%

==== General election results ====
Nonpartisan general results
Party	Candidate	Votes	%
Nonpartisan	Lisa Fricke	31,384	64.72%
Nonpartisan	Glen A. Flint	17,111	35.28%
Total votes		48,495	100.00%

=== District 3 ===
Incumbent Board member Rachel Wise ran for re-election and won another term unopposed.

==== Candidates ====
- Rachel Wise, incumbent Board member

==== Primary election results ====
Nonpartisan primary results
Party	Candidate	Votes	%
Nonpartisan	Rachel Wise	29,458	100.00%
Total votes		29,458	100.00%

==== General election results ====
Nonpartisan general results
Party	Candidate	Votes	%
Nonpartisan	Rachel Wise	70,797	100.00%
Total votes		70,797	100.00%

=== District 4 ===
Incumbent Board member John Witzel ran for re-election and was elected unopposed.

==== Candidates ====
- John Witzel, incumbent Board member

==== Primary election results ====
Nonpartisan primary results
Party	Candidate	Votes	%
Nonpartisan	John Witzel	16,498	100.00%
Total votes		16,498	100.00%

==== General election results ====
Nonpartisan general results
Party	Candidate	Votes	%
Nonpartisan	John Witzel	57,477	100.00%
Total votes		57,477	100.00%

== Board of Regents ==
=== District 6 ===
Incumbent Regent Kent Schroeder declined to run for re-election. Agribusiness executive Paul Kenney, businesswoman Mary George, and attorney Marsha Fangmeyer ran to succeed him. In the nonpartisan primary, Kenney placed first and Fangmeyer narrowly defeated George for second place, enabling her to advance to the general election. Kenney defeated Fangmeyer with 58% of the vote.

==== Candidates ====
- Paul Kenney, agribusiness executive
- Marsha E. Fangmeyer, attorney
- Mary George, businesswoman

==== Primary election results ====
Nonpartisan primary results
Party	Candidate	Votes	%
Nonpartisan	Paul Kenney	18,105	43.93%
Nonpartisan	Marsha E. Fangmeyer	8,769	21.29%
Nonpartisan	Mary George	8,601	20.88%
Total votes		35,475	100.00%

==== General election results ====
Nonpartisan general results
Party	Candidate	Votes	%
Nonpartisan	Paul Kenney	45,836	57.89%
Nonpartisan	Marsha E. Fangmeyer	33,357	42.11%
Total votes		79,193	100.00%

=== District 7 ===
Incumbent Regent Bob Phares ran for re-election and faced no opposition.

==== Candidates ====
- Bob Phares, incumbent Regent

==== Primary election results ====
Nonpartisan primary results
Party	Candidate	Votes	%
Nonpartisan	Bob Phares	33,549	100.00%
Total votes		33,549	100.00%

==== General election results ====
Nonpartisan general results
Party	Candidate	Votes	%
Nonpartisan	Bob Phares	76,158	100.00%
Total votes		76,158	100.00%

== See also ==
- Elections in Nebraska
- Political party strength in Nebraska
- Nebraska Democratic Party
- Nebraska Republican Party
- Government of Nebraska
- 2022 United States elections
