= Dan Urwiller =

American politician

Daniel G. Urwiller

Member of the Nebraska Public Service Commission from the 5th district
- In office January 9, 1987 – May 1, 2001
- Preceded by: Robert O. Brayton
- Succeeded by: Jerry Vap

Member of the Nebraska State Board of Education from the 7th district
- In office January 6, 1983 – January 9, 1987
- Preceded by: Arlene E. Hart
- Succeeded by: Thelma Lang

Personal details
- Born: August 13, 1949 (age 77) Kearney, Nebraska
- Party: Republican
- Children: 2 (Darren, Christopher)
- Education: Kearney State College (B.A.)

Daniel G. "Dan" Urwiller (born August 13, 1949) is a Republican politician who served as a member of the Nebraska Public Service Commission from 1987 until his resignation in 2001, and as a member of the Nebraska State Board of Education from 1983 to 1987.

== Early life ==
Urwiller was born in Kearney, Nebraska, and graduated from Ravenna High School in 1967. He attended Central Technical Community College and ultimately graduated from Kearney State College with his bachelor's degree in 1973.

In 1974, following the retirement of Bonnie Applegate, the Buffalo County Clerk, Urwiller ran to succeed her. He defeated Frances Saltzgaber in the Republican primary, and advanced to the general election, where he faced Mildred Hemmingsen, the Democratic nominee. Urwiller defeated Hemmingsen in a landslide, winning 61 percent of the vote to her 39 percent. In 1978, Urwiller ran for re-election to a second term. He defeated Donna Erpelding, an employee in the county attorney's office, in the Republican primary, and was unopposed in the general election.

== Nebraska State Board of Education ==
Arlene Hart, who represented the 7th district on the Nebraska State Board of Education, declined to seek re-election in 1982, and Urwiller ran to succeed her. In the nonpartisan primary election, he faced farmer Gerald Clausen. In the primary election, Clausen narrowly placed first over Urwiller, winning 53 percent of the vote to Urwiller's 47 percent. However, Urwiller ultimately won the general election, receiving 52 percent of the vote.

== Nebraska Public Service Commission ==
In 1986, Public Service Commissioner Robert O. Brayton declined to seek re-election to a second term. Urwiller ran to succeed him in the 5th district, which included most of central and western Nebraska. In the Republican primary, he faced farmer Jerry O'Connor, Corrinne Hasenauer Pedersen, a local chamber of commerce official; Dawson County Commissioner Jack Stuckey; and Hay Springs City Attorney James Wefso. Urwiller won a narrow plurality in the primary, receiving 25 percent of the vote. In the general election, Urwiller was opposed by Furnas County Assessor Ruby Hays, the Democratic nominee. Urwiller defeated Hays by a wide margin, winning 56 percent of the vote to her 44 percent.

Urwiller ran for re-election in 1992. He was unopposed in the Republican primary, and in the general election, was challenged by Don Egenberger, the general manager of a retail store. He defeated Egenberger in a landslide, winning 63 percent of the vote.

Urwiller ran for re-election in 1998, and was challenged in the Republican primary by real estate broker James Anderson. The campaign between Urwiller and Anderson focused on the effects of telecommunications deregulation on rural Nebraska, which they both agreed would be harmful. Urwiller only narrowly defeated Anderson, winning renomination with 53 percent of the vote. He was unopposed in the general election.

In 2000, following the retirement of Congressman Bill Barrett, Urwiller ran to succeed him in the 3rd district. However, following the entry of former University of Nebraska head football coach Tom Osborne, Urwiller dropped out of the race.

== Controversy ==
On April 15, 2000, Urwiller was arrested for driving under the influence in Gibbon. On December 1, 2000, Urwiller pleaded guilty to refusing to submit to a preliminary breath test in exchange for the dismissal of the DUI charge, and was later sentenced to six months on probation.

In 2001, Urwiller borrowed a state car for two weeks. He logged almost 2,000 miles on the car and returned it in such a dirty condition that it cost $238 to fully remove mud from the car and the engine. He was subsequently invested by the state auditor's office for his alleged misuse of the car, as well as allegations that he had made personal telephone calls using a state credit card. The state legislature's Transportation Committee demanded that Urwiller either resign or apologize for his actions and reimburse the state. The Public Service Commission demanded that Urwiller provide information about his use of the car, and prepared to censure him if he failed to do so. Urwiller subsequently resigned from office on May 1, 2001, and subsequently entered an alcoholism treatment program.
