= Oak Creek Township, Saunders County, Nebraska =

Oak Creek Township
- Township
- Location in Saunders County
- Coordinates: 41°05′30″N 096°50′57″W
- Country: United States
- State: Nebraska
- County: Saunders

Area
  - Total: 36.12 sq mi (93.55 km^{2})
  - Land: 36.10 sq mi (93.49 km^{2})
  - Water: 0.023 sq mi (0.06 km^{2}) 0.06%
- Elevation: 1,300 ft (400 m)

Population (2020)
  - Total: 932
  - Density: 25.8/sq mi (9.97/km^{2})
- GNIS feature ID: 0838167

Oak Creek Township is one of twenty-four townships in Saunders County, Nebraska, United States. The population was 932 at the 2020 census, 40.8% of whom were of Czech ancestry, the second highest percentage of Czech-Americans in the United States. A 2021 estimate placed the township's population at 943.

The Village of Valparaiso lies within the township.

== See also ==
- County government in Nebraska
