= North Platte High School (Nebraska) =

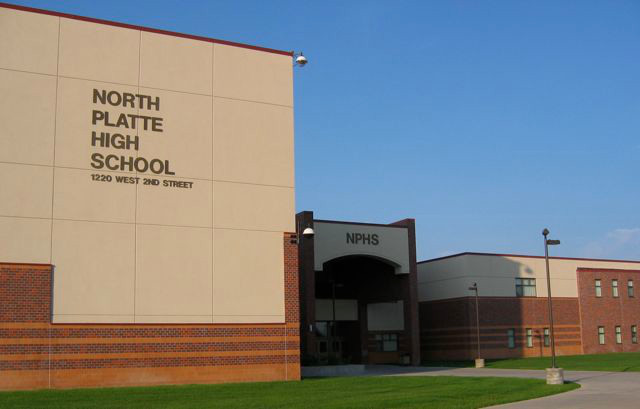
- North entrance of the school

Location
- 1220 West 2nd Street; North Platte, Nebraska 69103; United States; 41.1358739°N 100.7762146°W

Information
- Other name: NPHS
- Type: Public high school
- School district: North Platte Public Schools
- NCES School ID: 310002201330
- Principal: Cory Spotanski
- Teaching staff: 66.50 (on an FTE basis)
- Grades: 9–12
- Enrollment: 1,189 (2023-2024)
- Student to teacher ratio: 17.88
- Colors: Blue and gold
- Athletics conference: Greater Nebraska Athletic Conference
- Mascot: Bulldog
- Nickname: Bulldogs
- Newspaper: The Bulldogger
- Website: www.nppsd.org/o/nphs

North Platte High School (NPHS) is a public high school in North Platte, Nebraska, United States. It is part of the North Platte Public Schools district.

== History ==
The first public school in North Platte was a log schoolhouse located at the corner of 5th and Dewey streets. Built in 1868 using private funds and made of "red cedar logs which were obtained in the canyons south of the river," it opened on November 30, 1868, with less than twelve students. That number grew to around 80 by 1870, and despite an addition finished that year, the building became inadequate. Work began on a new building in 1873. The log school was sold at auction in 1874 for $611. It served several private functions until it was later torn down in April 1921.

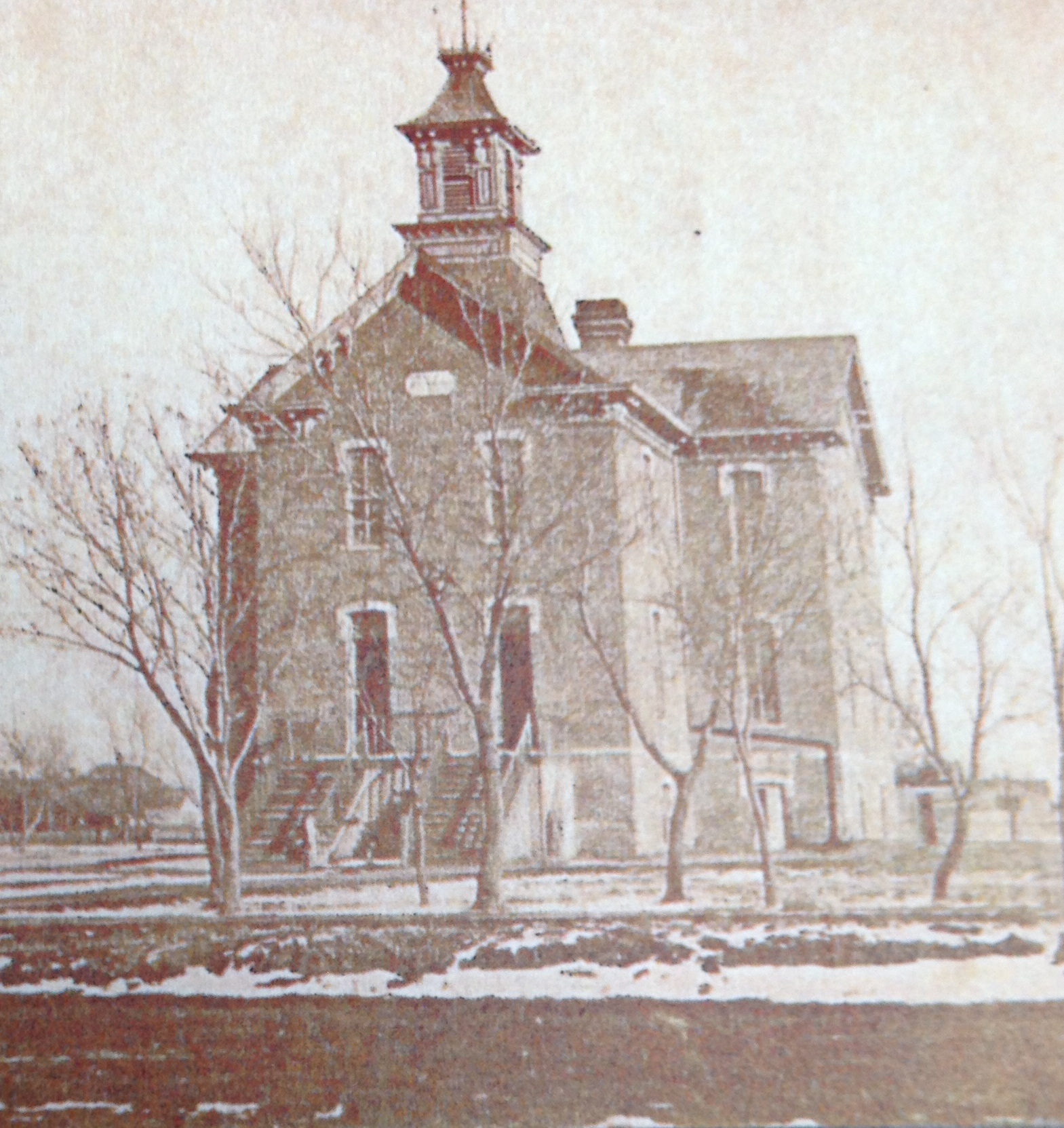
The first North Platte High School building, completed in 1874.

By 1874 the student population numbered 270, and on August 27 of that year, work was finished on a two-story brick school built between Third and Fourth streets on North Dewey. The building was damaged by an earthquake less than a year after its completion and, despite repairs, was declared unsafe in 1899.

In 1900, a new high school was completed on the same lot. It contained an auditorium, seven classrooms, and five recitation rooms. By 1920, North Platte's student population had grown to 1,685, and the building became crowded. It was eventually demolished in 1932 following a report in 1926 by engineers which stated, according to the Superintendent, that the "building was unsafe in a high wind." A number of the city's ward schools (schools for lower grades) were first constructed during its lifetime to accommodate increasing demand (most have since been completely rebuilt).

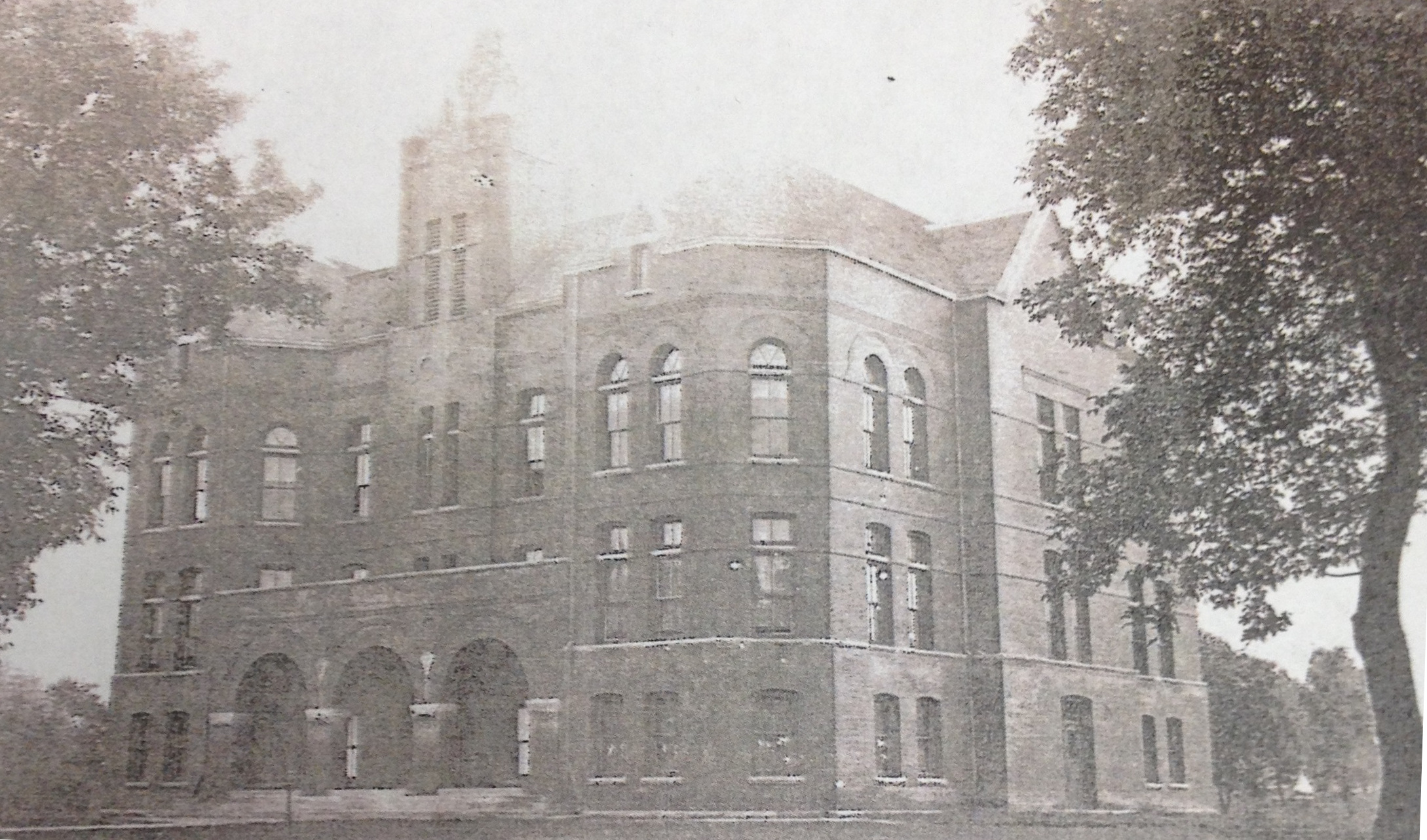
The second North Platte High School building, completed in 1900 and demolished in 1932.

In response to further increasing population, voters approved a $480,000 bond issue on May 28, 1929 to build a new high school (and for other purposes) on a 15-acre tract on west Second street at what was then the western edge of North Platte. The new building cost around $364,000 (in 1929 dollars), contained reinforced concrete floors and 700 recessed lockers, and was faced in red brick with terra cotta trim. It was dedicated on March 13, 1931. At the same time, a new track, athletic field, and concrete stadium with seating for 1500 were constructed just south of the new building. The school had 485 students and 22 teachers in its first year, but these numbers did not include the incoming freshman class which was scheduled to attend the school the following year. It had a capacity of 750 students and a "crowded capacity" of 900.

The 1930 building also featured an auditorium which, according to the 1931 Round-Up publication, was the largest in western Nebraska at the time. Eventually known as the Little Theater, it originally contained both bleachers and wooden seats, together providing a capacity for 1,100 people. It also had an orchestra pit, a balcony, and side dressing rooms. Part of the school modernization effort in the 1970s (discussed below) provided for the transformation of the auditorium into a fine arts theater. Its final performance was the 2003 Miss Nebraska Scholarship Pageant.

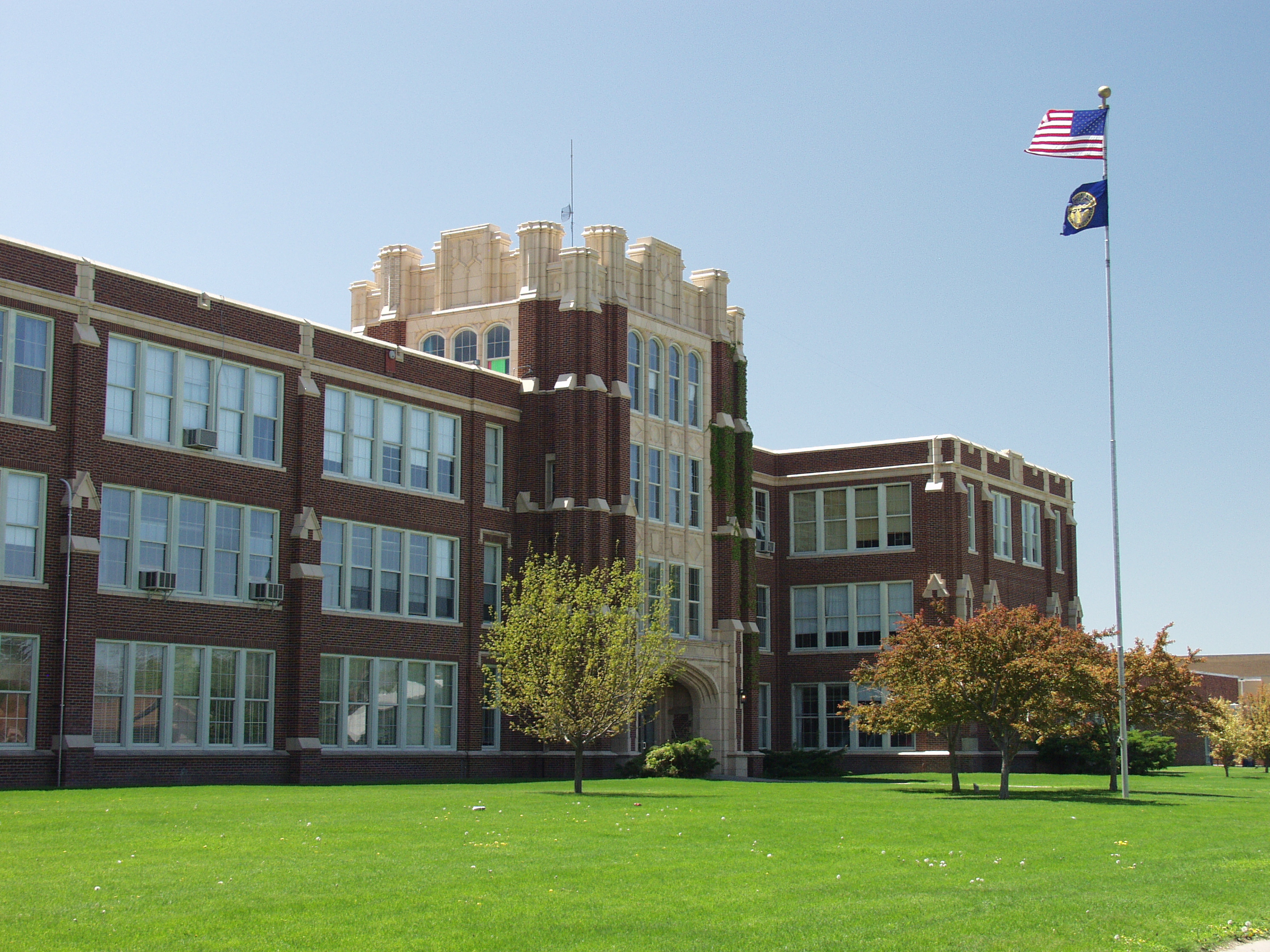
The third North Platte High School building, completed in 1930 and demolished in 2003.

Pressured by overcrowded conditions at the existing junior high school which caused freshmen to attend the senior high school, another bond issue, approved by a "substantial majority" on April 6, 1948, called for the construction of a new junior high on the same site as the senior high school. Adams Junior High was completed in 1950 to the west of the 1930 building at a cost of $987,000. In 1963, an addition on the west end the senior high school was built as part of a $2 million bond. The addition opened in time for the 1963-64 school year and contained new rooms for science, vocal music, and art, as well as new gymnasiums for physical education, wrestling, and gymnastics, an auto mechanics shop, a wood shop, a new library, and a cafeteria with seating for 300.

In the 1970s, a need was recognized to expand, replace, and modernize many of the city's schools. A 166-page report by the University of Northern Colorado's Educational Planning Service about current conditions throughout the school district noted that, in regards to the high school, with both the senior and junior high schools on the same 28-acre site, it was "severely congested." The report also found that many of the senior high schools' classrooms were too small and that the building itself was overcrowded. In 1975, the Citizens Advisory Committee distributed Look and See, a small brochure which highlighted safety and efficacy concerns at a number of school buildings and urged voters to support an upcoming bond issue to deal with them. The $9.99 million bond was approved by 60% of those voting on October 21, 1975. Part of the measure called for the construction of a new junior high school on another site (now known as Adams Middle School) and the subsequent connection of the 1930 and 1963 sections of North Platte High School with Adams Junior High, creating a larger senior high school.

This arrangement remained until January 1998 when another citizens group, the North Platte High School Facilities Task Force, was formed in order to "identify and prioritize the North Platte School District's high school facilities needs," to find a solution to those needs, and to recommend the solution to the Board of Education. It completed its work in April 1999. The task force identified a number of "immediate needs" concerning the building's site, security, educational space, mechanical systems, life safety, and accessibility. The group considered both the renovation of the existing building and a new construction project and found that "the total costs of the solutions involving renovation were substantially similar to the cost of constructing a new building on the same site." The group's report noted that the total cost of ownership would be lower for new construction and that renovation did not resolve all the concerns it had found. As a result, the group recommended the construction of a new facility on the same site.

Despite previous elections for new construction which failed in 1971, 1993 and 1997, and a proposal for major renovation of the current building which failed in 1994, a bond issue for the task force's proposal was passed by 63% of voters on April 4, 2000.

Community members broke ground for the new building on April 7, 2001, and the project was completed in the fall of 2003 at an approximate cost of $29 million. All three sections of the old high school were demolished and the ground where they sat became the new facility's parking lot. Three time capsules, one from the cornerstone of the 1930 building, one from 1987, and a new capsule containing a 2003-2004 school yearbook and other items, were placed in the new facility's cornerstone during the dedication ceremony on September 14, 2003. The 270,000-square-foot building has a capacity of 1,600 students (expandable to 2,000 with additions) and features an energy-efficient ground source heat pump heating and cooling system, a large common area, larger gymnasiums, classrooms, and cafeteria, a 1,200-seat performing arts auditorium, a media center, and modern computer, camera, life safety, and security systems.

== Athletics ==
North Platte High School is a member of the Nebraska School Activities Association and competes in the Greater Nebraska Athletic Conference. The school mascot is the Bulldog.

Bulldog teams face numerous long trips to Lincoln and Omaha every season in most sports due to North Platte being the only Class A (largest classification) school west of US Highway 183. It is one of three Class A schools--the others being Grand Island and Kearney--west of US Highway 81.

State championships
| Season | Sport | Number of championships | Year |
|---|---|---|---|
| Fall | Football | 0 | |
| Fall | Cross country, boys | 0 | |
| Fall | Cross country, girls | 3 | 1980, 1981, 1982 |
| Fall | Volleyball | 2 | 1979, 1980 |
| Fall | Softball | 0 | |
| Fall | Golf, girls | 1 | 2020 |
| Fall | Tennis, boys | 1 | 1970 |
| Fall | Unified bowling | 0 | |
| Winter | Basketball, boys | 0 | |
| Winter | Basketball, girls | 0 | |
| Winter | Swimming, boys | 0 | |
| Winter | Swimming, girls | 0 | |
| Winter | Wrestling, boys | 0 | |
| Winter | Wrestling, girls | 0 | |
| Winter | Bowling, boys | 0 | |
| Winter | Bowling, girls | 0 | |
| Spring | Baseball | 0 | |
| Spring | Soccer, boys | 0 | |
| Spring | Soccer, girls | 0 | |
| Spring | Track and field, boys | 2 | 1936, 1952 |
| Spring | Track and field, girls | 1 | 1971 |
| Spring | Golf, boys | 1 | 2019 |
| Spring | Tennis, girls | 0 | |
| Total | | 11 | |

== Notable alumni ==
- Nathan Enderle, NFL player
- Elaine Mardis, scientist and geneticist
- Daryl Mundis, lawyer
- Zane Smith, MLB player
- Danny Woodhead, NFL player
- Roland Locke (1922), set a world record in the 220-yard dash when he ran it in 20.6 seconds in 1926; Jesse Owens broke the record 10 years later by running the race in 20.3 seconds
- Katie Meuser, Chicago-based artist
