= Montgomery, Georgia =

- Unincorporated community Census-designated place
- Location in Chatham County and the state of Georgia
- Coordinates: 31°56′36″N 81°6′24″W
- Country: United States
- State: Georgia
- County: Chatham

Area
  - Total: 6.10 sq mi (15.81 km^{2})
  - Land: 5.22 sq mi (13.51 km^{2})
  - Water: 0.89 sq mi (2.30 km^{2})
- Elevation: 13 ft (4.0 m)

Population (2020)
  - Total: 4,443
  - Density: 852.0/sq mi (328.95/km^{2})
- Time zone: UTC-5 (Eastern (EST))
  - Summer (DST): UTC-4 (EDT)
- FIPS code: 13-52332
- GNIS feature ID: 0332411

Montgomery is an unincorporated community and census-designated place (CDP) in Chatham County, Georgia, United States. The population was 4,443 at the 2020 United States census, down slightly from 4,523 in 2010. It is a suburb of Savannah and is part of the Savannah metropolitan area.

== History ==
Montgomery is believed to be the location of an early settlement in the Savannah area (prior to General Oglethorpe's land grant in 1733) founded by three brothers who were British baronets: William, James, and Robert Montgomery. They received a land grant in 1677. They failed to maintain a permanent settlement, due to poor location and disease, and therefore lost their grant. The brothers moved to the more established Virginia Colony. The name of the settlement continues in this area of Chatham county, as well as Old Montgomery Road, Montgomery Street, and Montgomery Cross Road.

== Geography ==
Montgomery is located south of the center of Chatham County at 31°56′36″N 81°6′24″W (31.943237, -81.106648). It occupies a neck of land bordered on the west by the Vernon River, on the east by the Moon River, and on the south by the Burnside River; all of which are tidal. The northeast border of the CDP is formed by Georgia SR 204 Spur, which leads to Skidaway Island. Downtown Savannah is 13 miles (21 km) north of the Montgomery town center.

According to the United States Census Bureau, the CDP has a total area of 6.1 square miles (15.7 km^{2}), of which 5.2 square miles (13.5 km^{2}) is land and 0.85 square miles (2.2 km^{2}), or 13.94%, is water.

== Demographics ==
Historical population
Census	Pop.	Note	%±
1990	4,327		—
2000	4,134		−4.5%
2010	4,523		9.4%
2020	4,443		−1.8%
U.S. Decennial Census; 1850-1870 1870-1880; 1890-1910 1920-1930; 1940 1950 1960; 1970 1980 1990; 2000 2010 2020

Montgomery first appeared as a census designated place in the 1990 U.S. census.

=== Racial and ethnic composition ===
Montgomery, Georgia – Racial and ethnic composition Note: the US Census treats Hispanic/Latino as an ethnic category. This table excludes Latinos from the racial categories and assigns them to a separate category. Hispanics/Latinos may be of any race.
Race / Ethnicity (NH = Non-Hispanic)	Pop 2000	Pop 2010	Pop 2020	% 2000	% 2010	% 2020
White alone (NH)	3,612	3,463	2,930	87.37%	76.56%	65.95%
Black or African American alone (NH)	382	396	329	9.24%	8.76%	7.40%
Native American or Alaska Native alone (NH)	4	12	19	0.10%	0.27%	0.43%
Asian alone (NH)	25	65	50	0.60%	1.44%	1.13%
Pacific Islander alone (NH)	14	3	2	0.34%	0.07%	0.05%
Some Other Race alone (NH)	4	6	25	0.10%	0.13%	0.56%
Mixed Race or Multi-Racial (NH)	32	52	163	0.77%	1.15%	3.67%
Hispanic or Latino (any race)	61	526	925	1.48%	11.63%	20.82%
Total	4,134	4,523	4,443	100.00%	100.00%	100.00%

=== 2020 census ===
As of the 2020 census, Montgomery had a population of 4,443. The median age was 40.4 years. 22.9% of residents were under the age of 18 and 19.2% were 65 years of age or older. For every 100 females there were 99.1 males, and for every 100 females age 18 and over there were 99.1 males age 18 and over.

99.1% of residents lived in urban areas, while 0.9% lived in rural areas.

There were 1,702 households in Montgomery, including 1,161 family households. Of all households, 30.3% had children under the age of 18 living in them, 51.3% were married-couple households, 19.8% were households with a male householder and no spouse or partner present, and 24.0% were households with a female householder and no spouse or partner present. About 26.3% of all households were made up of individuals, and 13.3% had someone living alone who was 65 years of age or older.

There were 1,837 housing units, of which 7.3% were vacant. The homeowner vacancy rate was 1.4% and the rental vacancy rate was 7.1%.

== Notable people ==
- Henry McKenzie (died 1974), newspaper publisher and politician
