= Rod Johnson (Nebraska politician) =

American politician (born 1957)

Member of the Nebraska Public Service Commission from the 4th district
- In office January 7, 1993 – January 5, 2023
- Preceded by: Eric Rasmussen
- Succeeded by: Eric Kamler

Member of the Nebraska Legislature from the 34th district
- In office January 5, 1983 – January 6, 1993
- Preceded by: Maurice Kremer
- Succeeded by: Janis Johnson McKenzie

Personal details
- Born: August 18, 1957 (age 69) Hastings, Nebraska
- Spouse: Lisa Leininger
- Children: 2 (Alexa, Kyle)
- Education: Nebraska Wesleyan University (B.S.)

Rod Johnson (born August 18, 1957) is a Republican politician who served as a member of Nebraska Public Service Commission from 1993 to 2023, and in the Nebraska Legislature from 1983 to 1993.

== Early life ==
Johnson was born in Hastings, Nebraska, and graduated from Harvard High School in 1976. He attended Nebraska Wesleyan University, graduating with a bachelor's degree in history and political science in 1981. Johnson worked as a legislative aide to Senators Rex Haberman and Richard Peterson.

== Nebraska Legislature ==
In 1982, State Senator Maurice Kremer declined to seek re-election from the 34th district, which included Clay, Hall, Hamilton, Merrick, and Polk counties. In the primary election, he faced Hamilton County Commissioner Ted Regier, farmer Ed Eilts, and pharmacist John Harris. In the primary election, Johnson placed first with 53 percent of the vote, and he advanced to the general election with Regier, who placed second with 25 percent of the vote. He defeated Regier by a wide margin, winning 59 percent of the vote. Johnson was re-elected in 1986 without opposition.

Johnson ran for Congress in 1990 United States House of Representatives elections in Nebraska#District 3 from the 3rd district following the retirement of Republican Congresswoman Virginia D. Smith. He lost in the Republican primary to State Legislature Speaker Bill Barrett, winning 15 percent of the vote to Barrett's 30 percent. After the defeat in the primary, Johnson announced that he would run for re-election to his seat in the legislature as a write-in candidate. Johnson defeated farmer Gary Hansen and insurance salesman Larry Jones, receiving 43 percent of the vote to Hansen's 34 percent and Jones's 22 percent. He resigned from the legislature on January 5, 1993, after his election to the Public Service Commission.

== Nebraska Public Service Commission ==
Public Service Commissioner Eric Rasmussen declined to seek re-election to another term on the commission, and Johnson ran to succeed him in the 4th district. Johnson ran in a crowded Republicanp rimary that included businessman Ron Brown; furniture dealer Jim Greiner; engineer Leslie Olson; Robert Rasmussen, a member of the Howard-Greeley Rural Public Power District Board of Directors; and Les Taylor, a member of the Nebraska Public Power District Board of Directors Johnson placed first in the primary, receiving 48 percent of the vote. In the general election, he faced Wendell Johnson, the Democratic nominee and a member of the Central Nebraska Public Power and Irrigation District Board of Directors. Johnson defeated his Democratic opponent by a wide margin, receiving 62 percent of the vote. Johnson ran for re-election in 1998, and won the Republican primary over Mike Delka with 75 percent of the vote. He faced no challengers in the general election and won his second term unopposed.

In 2004, Johnson was challenged in the Republican primary by Webster County Commissioner Mary Delka. He won re-nomination with 68 percent of the vote. In the general election, Johnson was only opposed by Nebraska Party nominee Peter Rosberg. He won re-election with 73 percent of the vote.

Johnson ran for re-election to a fourth term in 2010, and was challenged in the Republican primary by Nebraska Party founder Paul A. Rosberg and Webster County Commissioner Roger L. Bohrer. He defeated both, winning a plurality in the primary with 49 percent of the vote to Rosberg's 24 percent and Bohrer's 19 percent. He faced no opposition in the general election and won unopposed.

In 2016, Johnson ran for re-election and was challenged by farmer Dakota Delka and high school guidance counselor Tammy Cheatum in the Republican primary. He won the primary with 64 percent of the vote. He was unopposed in the general election.

Johnson ran for a sixth term in 2022, and was challenged in the Republican primary by Geneva Mayor Eric Kamler. Kamler criticized Johnson for his poor attendance at Commission meetings, and defeated Johnson in the primary by a wide margin, winning 58 percent of the vote to Johnson's 42 percent.
