= North Platte Public Schools (Nebraska) =

Public school district in North Platte, Nebraska

Location
- North Platte, Lincoln County, Nebraska; United States

District information
- Type: Public
- Motto: "United In Respect, Destined For Greatness"
- Grades: Pre-Kindergarten - 12
- Superintendent: Dr. Ron Hanson
- NCES District ID: 3100022

Students and staff
- Students: 4217
- Teachers: 270.99 (FTE)
- Staff: 550.19 (FTE)

Other information
- Website: https://www.nppsd.org

North Platte Public Schools (NPPS) is a public school district in North Platte, Nebraska, United States.

== Facilities ==
The following schools are currently in operation by NPPS.

- High schools (1): North Platte High School
- Middle schools (2): Adams Middle School and Madison Middle School
- Elementary schools (8): Buffalo Elementary, Cody Elementary, Eisenhower Elementary, Jefferson Elementary, Lake Maloney Elementary, Lincoln Elementary, McDonald Elementary, and Washington Elementary.

NPPS also operates its main office building (McKinley Education Center), and a maintenance and bus barn building.

Schools formerly in use but which have since been closed include Roosevelt, Cleveland, Taft, and Osgood schools.
