= Hordville, Nebraska =

- Village
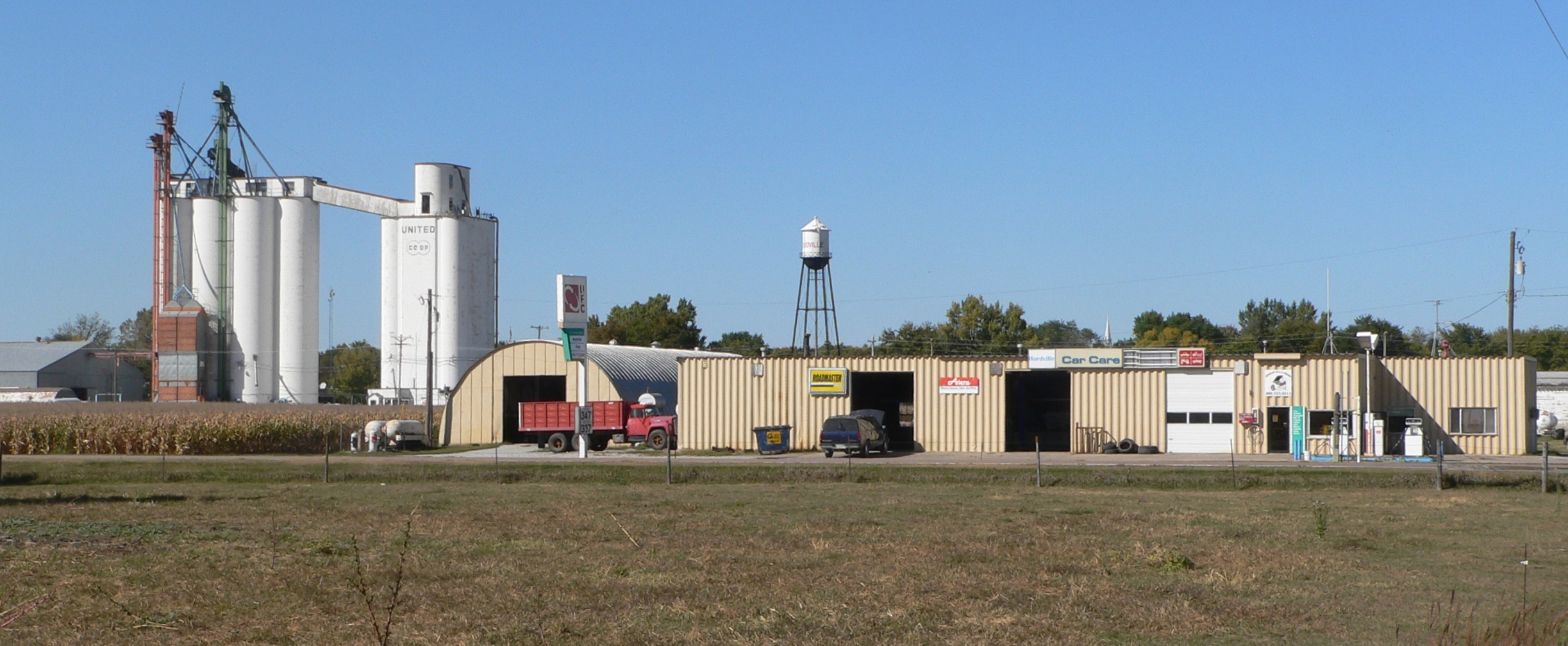
- Hordville, seen from the south

- Location of Hordville, Nebraska
- Coordinates: 41°04′46″N 97°53′25″W
- Country: United States
- State: Nebraska
- County: Hamilton

Area
  - Total: 0.27 sq mi (0.69 km^{2})
  - Land: 0.27 sq mi (0.69 km^{2})
  - Water: 0 sq mi (0.00 km^{2})
- Elevation: 1,778 ft (542 m)

Population (2020)
  - Total: 131
  - Density: 490.2/sq mi (189.25/km^{2})
- Time zone: UTC-6 (Central (CST))
  - Summer (DST): UTC-5 (CDT)
- ZIP code: 68846
- Area code: 402
- FIPS code: 31-23200
- GNIS feature ID: 2398545

Hordville is a village in Hamilton County, Nebraska, United States. As of the 2020 census, Hordville had a population of 131.

== History ==
Hordville was platted in 1906 when the Union Pacific Railroad was extended to that point. It was named for T. B. Hord, a landowner. Hordville was incorporated as a village in 1916.

== Geography ==
According to the United States Census Bureau, the village has a total area of 0.27 square miles (0.70 km^{2}), all land.

== Demographics ==
Historical population
Census	Pop.	Note	%±
1920	191		—
1930	175		−8.4%
1940	160		−8.6%
1950	116		−27.5%
1960	128		10.3%
1970	147		14.8%
1980	155		5.4%
1990	164		5.8%
2000	150		−8.5%
2010	144		−4.0%
2020	131		−9.0%
U.S. Decennial Census

=== 2010 census ===
As of the census of 2010, there were 144 people, 64 households, and 41 families residing in the village. The population density was 533.3 inhabitants per square mile (205.9/km^{2}). There were 70 housing units at an average density of 259.3 per square mile (100.1/km^{2}). The racial makeup of the village was 99.3% White and 0.7% from two or more races.

There were 64 households, of which 26.6% had children under the age of 18 living with them, 48.4% were married couples living together, 12.5% had a female householder with no husband present, 3.1% had a male householder with no wife present, and 35.9% were non-families. 25.0% of all households were made up of individuals, and 6.3% had someone living alone who was 65 years of age or older. The average household size was 2.25 and the average family size was 2.76.

The median age in the village was 44 years. 20.1% of residents were under the age of 18; 8.4% were between the ages of 18 and 24; 24.3% were from 25 to 44; 34% were from 45 to 64; and 13.2% were 65 years of age or older. The gender makeup of the village was 53.5% male and 46.5% female.

=== 2000 census ===
As of the census of 2000, there were 150 people, 58 households, and 48 families residing in the village. The population density was 569.9 inhabitants per square mile (220.0/km^{2}). There were 68 housing units at an average density of 258.3 per square mile (99.7/km^{2}). The racial makeup of the village was 98.67% White, and 1.33% from two or more races.

There were 58 households, out of which 41.4% had children under the age of 18 living with them, 67.2% were married couples living together, 6.9% had a female householder with no husband present, and 17.2% were non-families. 15.5% of all households were made up of individuals, and 1.7% had someone living alone who was 65 years of age or older. The average household size was 2.59 and the average family size was 2.88.

In the village, the population was spread out, with 28.0% under the age of 18, 4.0% from 18 to 24, 29.3% from 25 to 44, 26.0% from 45 to 64, and 12.7% who were 65 years of age or older. The median age was 39 years. For every 100 females, there were 154.2 males. For every 100 females age 18 and over, there were 129.8 males.

As of 2000 the median income for a household in the village was $31,000, and the median income for a family was $40,000. Males had a median income of $26,250 versus $17,250 for females. The per capita income for the village was $14,390. About 10.9% of families and 11.2% of the population were below the poverty line, including 9.8% of those under the age of 18 and none of those 65 and older.
