= Henry McKenzie =

American politician

Personal details
- Born: Montgomery, Georgia
- Died: June 23, 1974 (aged 92) Palatka, Florida
- Resting place: Oak Hill Cemetery in Palatka, Florida, United States

Henry Solomon McKenzie (died June 23, 1974) was an American newspaper publisher and politician. He was a member of the Florida legislature for 38 years and publisher of the Palatka Herald newspaper in Palatka, Florida. He is buried at Oak Hill Cemetery in Palatka, Florida.
