= North Bend, Nebraska =

- City
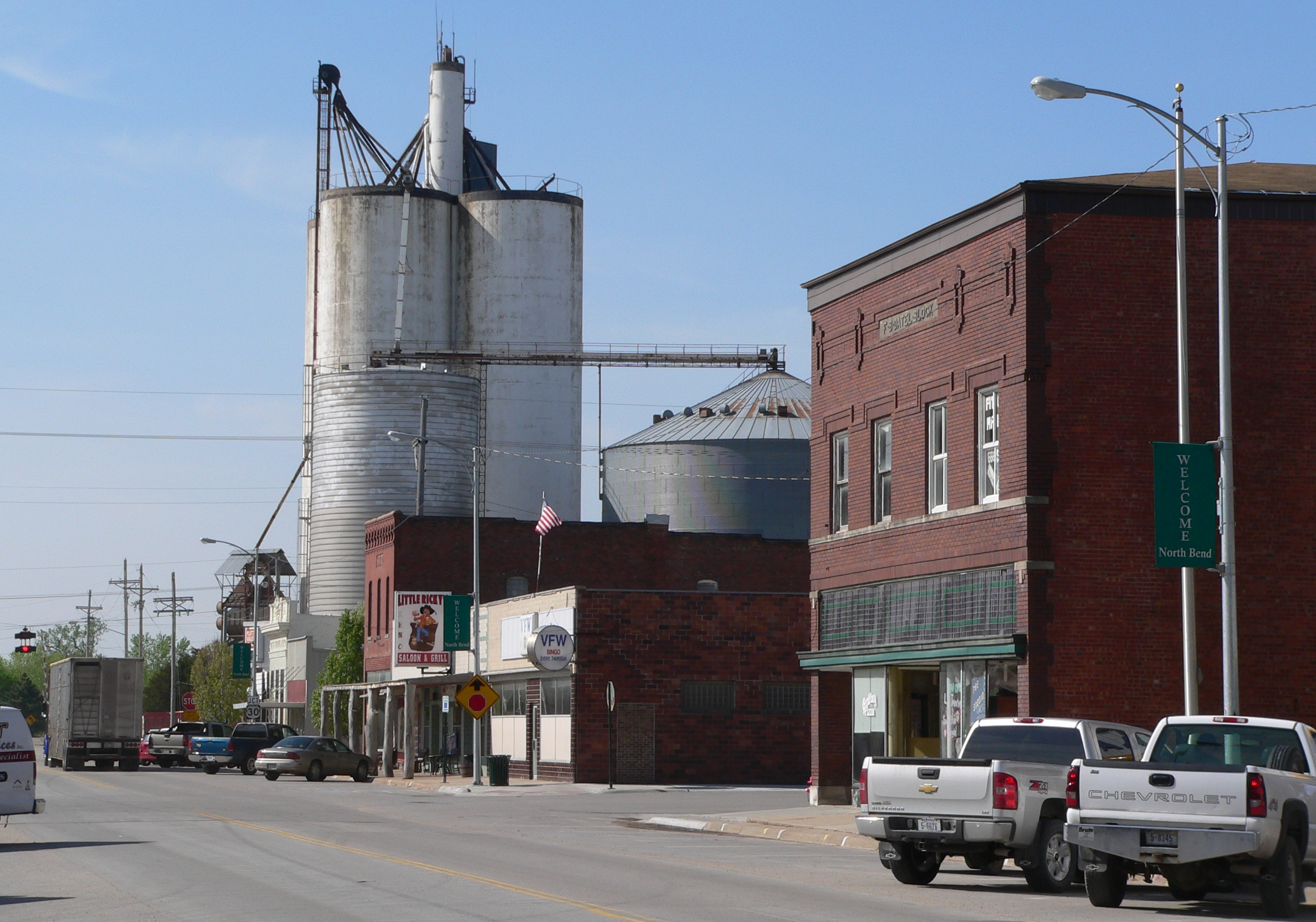
- Downtown North Bend: west side of Main Street

- Location of North Bend, Nebraska
- Coordinates: 41°27′43″N 96°47′09″W
- Country: United States
- State: Nebraska
- County: Dodge

Area
  - Total: 1.20 sq mi (3.10 km^{2})
  - Land: 1.12 sq mi (2.90 km^{2})
  - Water: 0.073 sq mi (0.19 km^{2})
- Elevation: 1,276 ft (389 m)

Population (2020)
  - Total: 1,279
  - Density: 1,141.5/sq mi (440.72/km^{2})
- Time zone: UTC-6 (Central (CST))
  - Summer (DST): UTC-5 (CDT)
- ZIP code: 68649
- Area code: 402
- FIPS code: 31-34720
- GNIS feature ID: 838161

North Bend is a city in Dodge County, Nebraska, United States. As of the 2020 census, North Bend had a population of 1,279.

== Geography ==
North Bend lies on the north bank of the Platte River, at the intersection of U.S. Route 30 and Nebraska Highway 79. The main east–west line of the Union Pacific Railroad passes through the city.

According to the United States Census Bureau, the city has a total area of 0.79 square miles (2.05 km^{2}), all land.

== History ==
The site of North Bend was settled in 1856 by a party of Scottish immigrants. En route from Lake Zurich, Illinois to Kansas, they stopped at a bend at the northernmost point of the Platte River, where they were invited to an impromptu Fourth of July celebration at a newly founded townsite named Emerson. Finding the site congenial, and concerned about the "Border War" in Kansas, they opted to remain there, founding a nearby townsite that they named Franklin.

The site grew with the arrival of new parties of settlers. One such party brought a steam-powered sawmill and meal-grinder, the first steam mill in Dodge County. In 1858, Emerson's name was changed to Wallace, after a Philadelphia philanthropist who had offered to build a library in any town taking his name. In the 1860s, the town had a pontoon bridge across the Platte River allowing for trade with the farms to the south of the river making into the local grain market, a prime business opportunity for the incoming Union Pacific Railroad.

The combined townsite arrived at its present name in 1864, when the Union Pacific (UP) Railroad bought a piece of ground for a depot on the proposed transcontinental railroad. For many years, surveys had shown the town's location as "the north bend" and was the northernmost point of the UP in the state of Nebraska. The residents and UP officials agreed on North Bend as the name for the town.

The first train arrived in North Bend in 1866, and the town was platted by the railroad in 1867. By 1876, the population had reached 250; there were 21 businesses, a school, and two churches. The city's first newspaper, the Independent, was founded in 1879.

Growth continued steadily. In 1890, the population reached 897; a city building was constructed. By 1920, North Bend had electricity, a waterworks, and paved streets; the population was 1,087. The town continued to grow through much of the 20th century, with its population reaching a peak of 1,368 in 1980.

== Demographics ==
Historical population
Census	Pop.	Note	%±
1880	415		—
1890	897		116.1%
1900	1,010		12.6%
1910	1,105		9.4%
1920	1,087		−1.6%
1930	1,108		1.9%
1940	1,003		−9.5%
1950	906		−9.7%
1960	1,174		29.6%
1970	1,350		15.0%
1980	1,368		1.3%
1990	1,249		−8.7%
2000	1,213		−2.9%
2010	1,177		−3.0%
2020	1,279		8.7%
U.S. Decennial Census

=== 2010 census ===
As of the census of 2010, there were 1,177 people, 447 households, and 317 families residing in the city. The population density was 1,489.9 inhabitants per square mile (575.3/km^{2}). There were 501 housing units at an average density of 634.2 per square mile (244.9/km^{2}). The racial makeup of the city was 98.1% White, 1.0% African American, 0.2% Native American, 0.2% Asian, 0.1% from other races, and 0.4% from two or more races. Hispanic or Latino of any race were 1.2% of the population.

There were 447 households, of which 33.6% had children under the age of 18 living with them, 57.0% were married couples living together, 8.9% had a female householder with no husband present, 4.9% had a male householder with no wife present, and 29.1% were non-families. 25.1% of all households were made up of individuals, and 13.4% had someone living alone who was 65 years of age or older. The average household size was 2.53 and the average family size was 2.99.

The median age in the city was 41.8 years. 27.4% of residents were under the age of 18; 4.9% were between the ages of 18 and 24; 21% were from 25 to 44; 26.8% were from 45 to 64; and 20% were 65 years of age or older. The gender makeup of the city was 48.2% male and 51.8% female.

=== 2000 census ===
As of the census of 2000, there were 1,213 people, 468 households, and 322 families residing in the city. The population density was 1,588.1 inhabitants per square mile (613.2/km^{2}). There were 509 housing units at an average density of 666.4 per square mile (257.3/km^{2}). The racial makeup of the city was 99.34% White, 0.08% African American, 0.16% Native American, 0.08% Asian, 0.16% from other races, and 0.16% from two or more races. Hispanic or Latino of any race were 0.82% of the population.

There were 468 households, out of which 35.7% had children under the age of 18 living with them, 57.1% were married couples living together, 9.4% had a female householder with no husband present, and 31.0% were non-families. 28.4% of all households were made up of individuals, and 19.7% had someone living alone who was 65 years of age or older. The average household size was 2.48 and the average family size was 3.04.

In the city, the population was 27.0% under the age of 18, 6.4% from 18 to 24, 23.7% from 25 to 44, 21.4% from 45 to 64, and 21.4% who were 65 years of age or older. The median age was 40 years. For every 100 females, there were 85.8 males. For every 100 females age 18 and over, there were 80.6 males.

As of 2000 the median income for a household in the city was $38,879, and the median income for a family was $43,984. Males had a median income of $31,324 versus $18,352 for females. The per capita income for the city was $15,897. About 3.3% of families and 5.1% of the population were below the poverty line, including 4.7% of those under age 18 and 11.2% of those age 65 or over.

== Economy ==
The largest industry in the North Bend area is agriculture. There are nearly 100 small businesses operating in the city. The largest single employers are North Bend Central Public Schools, which employs 76 people and serves Morse Bluff and Ames as well as North Bend. Birchwood Manor, a nursing home, was the No. 2 largest with 72 employees before closing in 2019.

== Media ==
The city's newspaper is the weekly North Bend Eagle. The paper was formed in November 1897 by the merger of the North Bend Argus and the North Bend Republican. It is the city's oldest continuously operating business.

== Transportation ==
Intercity bus service to the city is provided by Express Arrow.

== Notable people ==
- Marg Helgenberger, actress on CSI and China Beach
- Charles H. Purcell, Chief Engineer responsible for the design and construction of the San Francisco–Oakland Bay Bridge
- Eddie Watt, baseball player
