= Jerry Willhoft =

American politician

Jerry D. Willhoft

Member of the Nebraska Legislature from the 34th district
- In office August 27, 1997 – January 6, 1999
- Preceded by: Janis Johnson McKenzie
- Succeeded by: Bob Kremer

Personal details
- Born: 1935 (age 90–91)
- Party: Democratic
- Spouse: Shirley (m. 1957)
- Children: 4 (Jay, Joel, Jim, John)
- Education: University of Nebraska–Lincoln (B.S.)
- Occupation: Soil conservationist

Jerry Willhoft (born 1935) is a Democratic politician from Nebraska who served as a member of the Nebraska Legislature from the 34th district from 1997 to 1999.

== Early career ==
Willhoft was born on his family's farm in Central City, Nebraska, and graduated from Central City High School in 1954. He joined the Soil Conservation Service in 1960, and worked as a soil conservation specialist for thirty-six years. Willhoft later attended the University of Nebraska–Lincoln at the same time as two of his sons, and graduated with his bachelor's degree in agriculture in 1980. He served on the school boards in Imperial and Central City, and unsuccessfully ran for the school board in Chase County.

== Nebraska Legislature ==
In 1997, upon the resignation of State Senator Janis Johnson McKenzie, Governor Ben Nelson appointed Willhoft as her successor in the 34th district, and he was sworn in on August 27, 1997.

Willhoft ran for a full term in 1998, and was challenged by farmer Bob Kremer and Andy Jensen. In the primary election, Willhoft narrowly placed second, receiving 40 percent of the vote to Kremer's 42 percent, and they both advanced to the general election. Though the race was formally nonpartisan, Willhoft was a Democrat and Kremer was a Republican, and both parties invested in the election. Kremer ultimately defeated Willhoft, winning 55–45 percent.

In 2002, Willhoft announced that he would challenge Kremer for re-election. Kremer placed first over Willhoft by a wide margin in the primary election, winning 69% of the vote, and defeated Willhoft in a landslide in the general election, receiving 66 percent of the vote to Willhoft's 34 percent.
