= Bob Kremer =

American politician

Bob Kremer (born 1936) is a politician from the U.S. state of Nebraska. From 1999 to 2007, he represented the 34th District in the Nebraska Legislature. Kremer is a farmer and cattle feeder.

Kremer was born on January 8, 1936, in Aurora and graduated from Aurora High School in 1953, and Northwestern College in Minneapolis, Minnesota, in 1958.

In 1998, Kremer was elected to represent the 34th Nebraska legislative district; he was re-elected in 2002. During his tenure, he served on the Business and Labor and Natural Resources committees and was the chairperson of the Committee on Agriculture. Nebraska's term-limits law precluded his running for a third consecutive term in 2006.

== Notable recognition ==
Kremer was awarded the Nebraska Farm Bureau's highest honor, the Silver Eagle award. According to the Nebraska Farm Bureau, "this award honors outstanding leadership and distinguished service to the agricultural industry."

Preceded by Jerry Willhoft	Nebraska state senator-district 34; 1999-2007	Succeeded by Annette Dubas
