= Grand Island Public Schools =

Public school district

Location
- Grand Island, Nebraska United States

District information
- Motto: Every Student, Every Day, A Success!
- Grades: PK-12
- Established: 1867
- Superintendent: Matthew Fisher
- Schools: 23
- NCES District ID: 3100016

Students and staff
- Students: 9,920 (2020–21)
- Teachers: 716.76 (FTE)
- Staff: about 1,500

Other information
- Website: gips.org

Grand Island Public Schools (GIPS) is a public school district located in the city of Grand Island, Nebraska, United States. The district serves all of Grand Island. It has one high school, three middle schools, and fourteen elementary schools, as well as a preschool.

GIPS's superintendent is Matthew Fisher.

== Enrollment ==
GIPS enrolls 9,920 students as of the 2020–21 school year.

== Schools ==
The district operates fourteen elementary schools: Dodge, Engleman, Gates, Howard, Jefferson, Knickrehm, Lincoln, Newell, Seedling Mile, Shoemaker, Starr, Stolley Park, Wasmer, and West Lawn. It also has a preschool, Early Learning Center, for children aged 3–5.

There are three middle schools: Barr, Walnut, and Westridge.

There is one high school: Grand Island Senior High School or GISH.

=== High school ===
School	Mascot	Location	Grades	Enrollment	Opened
Grand Island Senior High	Islanders	2124 North Lafayette	9–12	2,558 (2017–18)	1870

=== Middle schools ===
School	Mascot	Location	Grades	Enrollment	Opened
R.J. Barr Middle School	Bulldogs	602 West Stolley Park Road	6–8	696 (2017–18)	1967
Walnut Middle School	Wildcats	1600 North Custer Avenue	6–8	771 (2017–18)	1994
Westridge Middle School	Cougars	4111 W. 13th Street	6–8	681 (2017–18)	2008

=== Elementary schools ===
School	Mascot	Location	Grades	Enrollment	Opened
Dodge Elementary School	Dragons	641 South Oak	K–5	482 (2017–18)	1940
Engleman Elementary School	Wildcats	1812 Mansfield Road	K–5	530 (2017–18)	2008
Gates Elementary School	Gators	2700 West Louise Street	K–5	415 (2017–18)	1955
Howard Elementary	Huskies	502 West 9th Street	K–5	401 (2017–18)	1954
Jefferson Elementary	All Stars	1314 W. 7th Street	K–5	279 (2017–18)	1971
Knickrehm Elementary	Cougars	2013 North Oak Street	K–5	247 (2017–18)	1966
Lincoln Elementary	Lynx	805 North Beal Street	K–5	369 (2017–18)	1911
Newell Elementary	Knights	2700 West 13th Street	K–5	491 (2017–18)	1955
Shoemaker Elementary	Eagles	4160 Old Potash Highway	K–5	375 (2017–18)	1964
Starr Elementary	Stallions	1800 S. Adams Street	K–5	525 (2017–18)	2018
Stolley Park Elementary	Panthers	1700 W. Stolley Park Road	K–5		2019
Wasmer Elementary	Wildcats	318 South Clark Street	K–5	367 (2017–18)	2000
West Lawn Elementary	Mustangs	3022 W. College Street	K–5	272 (2017–18)	1995

=== Alternative or specialized schools ===
School	Mascot	Location	Grades	Enrollment	Opened
O'Connor Learning Center		2208 N Webb Road	Pre–K		c. 2021
Success Academy		1912 North Lafayette Avenue	6–12		2011
