= Memphis, Nebraska =

- Village
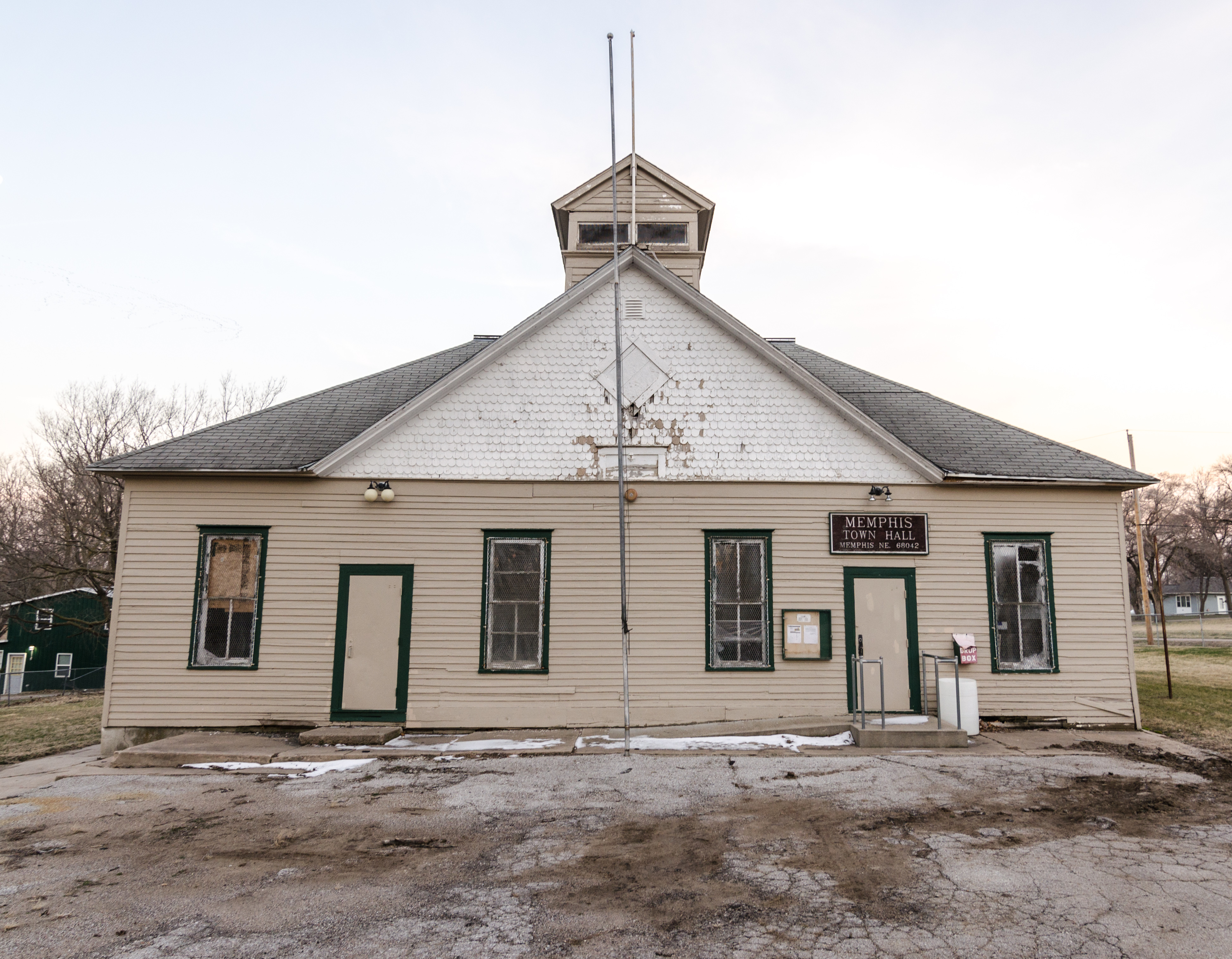
- The old town hall in Memphis, March 2017

- Location of Memphis, Nebraska
- Coordinates: 41°05′40″N 96°25′59″W
- Country: United States
- State: Nebraska
- County: Saunders

Area
  - Total: 0.089 sq mi (0.23 km^{2})
  - Land: 0.089 sq mi (0.23 km^{2})
  - Water: 0 sq mi (0.00 km^{2})
- Elevation: 1,093 ft (333 m)

Population (2020)
  - Total: 109
  - Density: 1,253/sq mi (483.9/km^{2})
- Time zone: UTC-6 (Central (CST))
  - Summer (DST): UTC-5 (CDT)
- ZIP code: 68042
- Area code: 402
- FIPS code: 31-31640
- GNIS feature ID: 2399311

Memphis is a village in Saunders County, Nebraska, United States. The population was 109 at the 2020 census.

== History ==
Memphis was established in the 1880s when the Chicago, Burlington and Quincy Railroad was extended to that point. A large share of the early settlers being natives of Memphis, Tennessee caused the name to be selected. Jack C. Owen owned the land that Memphis was platted on. Originally they wanted to call the town Owenville, but Mr. Owen wanted nothing to do with that, so the second choice was Memphis.

== Geography ==
According to the United States Census Bureau, the village has a total area of 0.09 square miles (0.23 km^{2}), all land.

== Demographics ==
Historical population
Census	Pop.	Note	%±
1910	162		—
1920	186		14.8%
1930	149		−19.9%
1940	103		−30.9%
1950	92		−10.7%
1960	77		−16.3%
1970	71		−7.8%
1980	89		25.4%
1990	117		31.5%
2000	106		−9.4%
2010	114		7.5%
2020	109		−4.4%
U.S. Decennial Census

=== 2010 census ===
As of the census of 2010, there were 114 people, 47 households, and 33 families living in the village. The population density was 1,266.7 inhabitants per square mile (489.1/km^{2}). There were 54 housing units at an average density of 600.0 per square mile (231.7/km^{2}). The racial makeup of the village was 100.0% White. Hispanic or Latino of any race were 4.4% of the population.

There were 47 households, of which 31.9% had children under the age of 18 living with them, 59.6% were married couples living together, 6.4% had a female householder with no husband present, 4.3% had a male householder with no wife present, and 29.8% were non-families. 25.5% of all households were made up of individuals, and 10.7% had someone living alone who was 65 years of age or older. The average household size was 2.43 and the average family size was 2.94.

The median age in the village was 38.8 years. 25.4% of residents were under the age of 18; 5.3% were between the ages of 18 and 24; 26.2% were from 25 to 44; 30.8% were from 45 to 64; and 12.3% were 65 years of age or older. The gender makeup of the village was 50.9% male and 49.1% female.

=== 2000 census ===
As of the census of 2000, there were 106 people, 44 households, and 31 families living in the village. The population density was 1,226.3 inhabitants per square mile (473.5/km^{2}). There were 46 housing units at an average density of 532.2 per square mile (205.5/km^{2}). The racial makeup of the village was 94.34% White, 1.89% Native American, and 3.77% from two or more races. Hispanic or Latino of any race were 3.77% of the population.

There were 44 households, out of which 31.8% had children under the age of 18 living with them, 63.6% were married couples living together, 4.5% had a female householder with no husband present, and 29.5% were non-families. 22.7% of all households were made up of individuals, and 6.8% had someone living alone who was 65 years of age or older. The average household size was 2.41 and the average family size was 2.90.

In the village, the population was spread out, with 26.4% under the age of 18, 1.9% from 18 to 24, 32.1% from 25 to 44, 27.4% from 45 to 64, and 12.3% who were 65 years of age or older. The median age was 39 years. For every 100 females, there were 130.4 males. For every 100 females age 18 and over, there were 116.7 males.

As of 2000 the median income for a household in the village was $41,875, and the median income for a family was $47,813. Males had a median income of $32,000 versus $23,125 for females. The per capita income for the village was $16,156. There were no families and 2.8% of the population living below the poverty line, including no under eighteens and 21.4% of those over 64.

== See also ==
- List of municipalities in Nebraska
