= Janis Johnson McKenzie =

American politician

Member of the Nebraska Legislature from the 34th district
- In office January 5, 1993 – July 31, 1997
- Preceded by: Rod Johnson
- Succeeded by: Jerry Willhoft

Personal details
- Born: February 28, 1955 (age 71) Hastings, Nebraska
- Party: Democratic
- Spouse: John Dee McKenzie (m. 1974)
- Children: 1 (Nathan)
- Education: University of Nebraska–Lincoln (B.S.); University of Connecticut (M.E.)
- Occupation: Educational consultant

Janis Johnson McKenzie (born February 28, 1955) is a Democratic politician and educator from Nebraska who served as a member of the Nebraska Legislature from the 34th district from 1993 to 1997. She was appointed by Governor Ben Nelson in 1993, re-elected in 1994, and resigned in 1997 to become the director of gifted education in the Nebraska Department of Education.

== Early career ==
McKenzie was born in Hastings, Nebraska, and graduated from Sutton High School. She attended the University of Nebraska–Lincoln, receiving her bachelor's degree in 1977, and the University of Connecticut, where she received her master's degree in education in 1989 McKenzie worked as a public school teacher in several local school districts and as a curriculum specialist.

== Nebraskas Legislature ==
Following the election of State Senator Rod Johnson to the Nebraska Public Service Commission in 1992, Governor Ben Nelson appointed McKenzie as his successor, and was sworn in on January 5, 1993.

McKenzie ran for re-election in 1994 and was challenged by Clay County Commissioner Gene Arnold. She placed first in the primary by a wide margin, winning 64 percent of the vote to Arnold's 36 percent, and won the general election in a landslide with 60 percent of the vote.

In 1997, McKenzie announced that she would resign from the legislature, effective July 31, 1997, to become the director of gifted education in the state Department of Education, citing several years of bad crops on her family farm and the need to earn a regular salary to support her family.
