= Valparaiso, Nebraska =

Village in Saunders County, Nebraska, United States

- Village
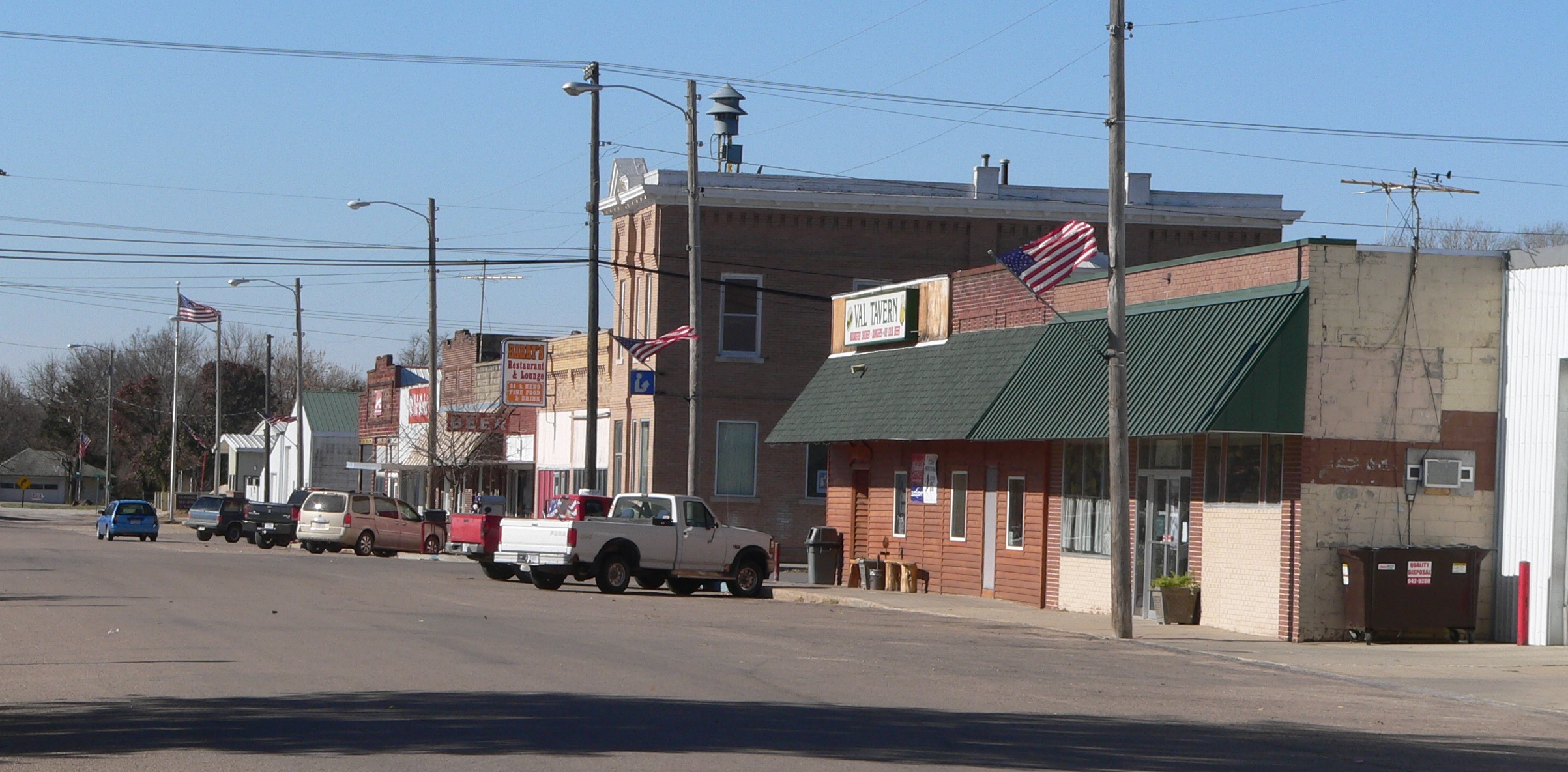
- Downtown Valparaiso: Second Street

- Location of Valparaiso, Nebraska

- Location within Nebraska Location within the United States
- Coordinates: 41°4′47″N 96°49′59″W
- Country: United States
- State: Nebraska
- County: Saunders
- Township: Oak Creek

Area
  - Total: 0.56 sq mi (1.46 km^{2})
  - Land: 0.56 sq mi (1.46 km^{2})
  - Water: 0 sq mi (0.00 km^{2})
- Elevation: 1,306 ft (398 m)

Population (2020)
  - Total: 595
  - Density: 1,056.0/sq mi (407.73/km^{2})
- Time zone: UTC-6 (Central (CST))
  - Summer (DST): UTC-5 (CDT)
- ZIP code: 68065
- Area code: 402
- FIPS code: 31-50125
- GNIS feature ID: 2400042
- Website: valparaisonebraska.com

Valparaiso (/ˌvælpəˈreɪzoʊ/ val-pə-RAY-zoh) is a village in Saunders County, Nebraska, United States. The population was 595 at the 2020 census.

== History ==
The early history of Valparaiso is unclear. It first appeared on an 1863 map. Valparaiso is derived from a Spanish name meaning "vale of paradise". Valparaiso was incorporated in 1880.

== Geography ==
According to the United States Census Bureau, the village has a total area of 0.56 square miles (1.45 km^{2}), all land.

== Demographics ==
Historical population
Census	Pop.	Note	%±
1880	300		—
1890	515		71.7%
1900	614		19.2%
1910	560		−8.8%
1920	599		7.0%
1930	523		−12.7%
1940	403		−22.9%
1950	392		−2.7%
1960	394		0.5%
1970	415		5.3%
1980	484		16.6%
1990	481		−0.6%
2000	563		17.0%
2010	570		1.2%
2020	595		4.4%
U.S. Decennial Census

=== 2010 census ===
As of the census of 2010, there were 570 people, 241 households, and 157 families living in the village. The population density was 1,017.9 inhabitants per square mile (393.0/km^{2}). There were 276 housing units at an average density of 492.9 per square mile (190.3/km^{2}). The racial makeup of the village was 97.7% White, 0.2% Native American, 0.4% Asian, 0.4% from other races, and 1.4% from two or more races. Hispanic or Latino of any race were 1.2% of the population.

There were 241 households, of which 31.1% had children under the age of 18 living with them, 54.4% were married couples living together, 5.8% had a female householder with no husband present, 5.0% had a male householder with no wife present, and 34.9% were non-families. 30.3% of all households were made up of individuals, and 14.1% had someone living alone who was 65 years of age or older. The average household size was 2.37 and the average family size was 2.97.

The median age in the village was 41.4 years. 25.1% of residents were under the age of 18; 5.8% were between the ages of 18 and 24; 23.8% were from 25 to 44; 29.2% were from 45 to 64; and 16% were 65 years of age or older. The gender makeup of the village was 48.8% male and 51.2% female.

=== 2000 census ===
As of the census of 2000, there were 563 people, 232 households, and 150 families living in the village. The population density was 1,028.5 inhabitants per square mile (397.1/km^{2}). There were 245 housing units at an average density of 447.6 per square mile (172.8/km^{2}). The racial makeup of the village was 98.58% White, 0.18% Native American, 0.18% Asian, 0.89% from other races, and 0.18% from two or more races. Hispanic or Latino of any race were 1.07% of the population.

There were 232 households, out of which 32.8% had children under the age of 18 living with them, 55.2% were married couples living together, 6.5% had a female householder with no husband present, and 35.3% were non-families. 32.3% of all households were made up of individuals, and 15.5% had someone living alone who was 65 years of age or older. The average household size was 2.43 and the average family size was 3.11.

In the village, the population was spread out, with 28.2% under the age of 18, 7.1% from 18 to 24, 28.8% from 25 to 44, 21.5% from 45 to 64, and 14.4% who were 65 years of age or older. The median age was 38 years. For every 100 females, there were 94.8 males. For every 100 females age 18 and over, there were 95.2 males.

As of 2000 the median income for a household in the village was $39,444, and the median income for a family was $47,981. Males had a median income of $32,143 versus $24,712 for females. The per capita income for the village was $18,024. About 2.7% of families and 4.2% of the population were below the poverty line, including 1.8% of those under age 18 and 8.4% of those age 65 or over.

== See also ==
- List of municipalities in Nebraska
