= Hamilton County, Nebraska =

County in Nebraska, United States

- County
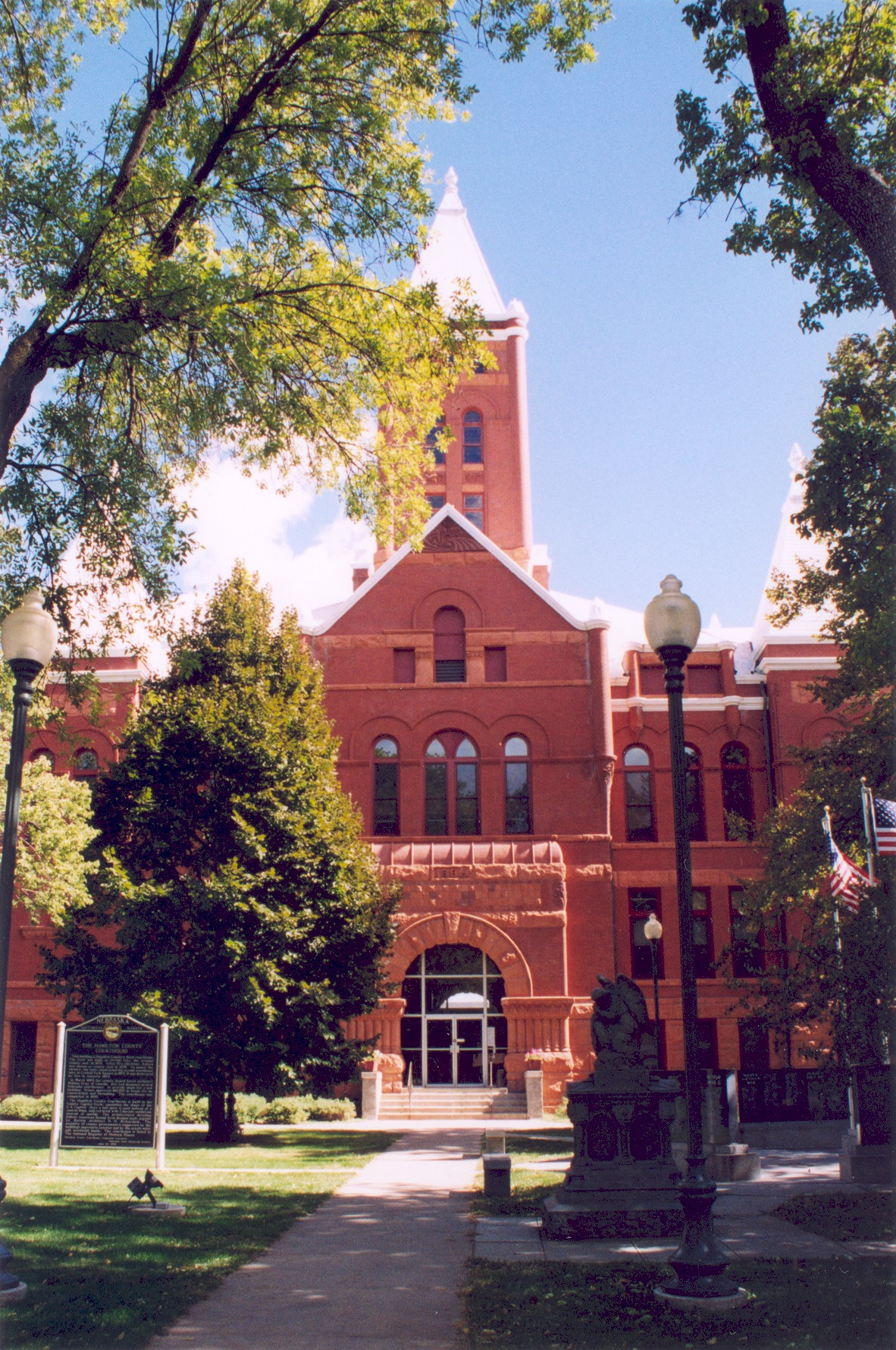
- Hamilton County Courthouse in Aurora

- Location within the U.S. state of Nebraska
- Coordinates: 40°53′N 98°01′W
- Country: United States
- State: Nebraska
- Founded: 1867 (created); 1870 (organized)
- Named for: Alexander Hamilton
- Seat: Aurora
- Largest city: Aurora

Area
  - Total: 547 sq mi (1,420 km^{2})
  - Land: 544 sq mi (1,410 km^{2})
  - Water: 4.1 sq mi (11 km^{2}) 0.8%

Population (2020)
  - Total: 9,429
  - Estimate (2025): 9,678 ▲
  - Density: 17.3/sq mi (6.69/km^{2})
- Time zone: UTC−6 (Central)
  - Summer (DST): UTC−5 (CDT)
- Congressional district: 3rd
- Website: hamiltoncountyne.gov

Hamilton County is a county in the U.S. state Nebraska. As of the 2020 United States Census, the population was 9,429. Its county seat is Aurora. The county was named for Alexander Hamilton, the first Secretary of the Treasury in the new United States government.

Hamilton County is included in the Grand Island metropolitan area.

In the Nebraska license plate system, Hamilton County is represented by the prefix 28 (it had the 28th-largest number of vehicles registered in the county when the license plate system was established in 1922).

== History ==
The first permanent settlers arrived in Hamilton County in 1866. Hamilton County was created in 1867, and was organized in 1870. It was named for Alexander Hamilton.

== Geography ==
The Platte River flows northeastward along the northwest side of Hamilton County, forming the northwestern boundary line with Merrick County.

According to the U.S. Census Bureau, the county has a total area of 547 square miles (1,420 km^{2}), of which 543 square miles (1,410 km^{2}) is land and 4.1 square miles (11 km^{2}) (0.8%) is water.

=== Major highways ===
- Interstate 80
- U.S. Highway 34
- Nebraska Highway 2
- Nebraska Highway 14
- Nebraska Highway 66

=== Adjacent counties ===
- Polk County – northeast
- York County – east
- Clay County – south
- Adams County – southwest
- Hall County – west
- Merrick County – north

=== Protected areas ===
- Gadwall State Wildlife Management Area
- Nelson Federal Waterfowl Production Area
- Pintail State Wildlife Management Area
- Rainwater Basin Wildlife Management District
- Springer Federal Waterfowl Production Area
- Troester Federal Waterfowl Production Area
- Deep Well State Wildlife Management Area

== Demographics ==
Historical population
| Census | Pop. | Note | %± |
|---|---|---|---|
| 1870 | 130 | | — |
| 1880 | 8,267 | | 6,259.2% |
| 1890 | 14,096 | | 70.5% |
| 1900 | 13,330 | | −5.4% |
| 1910 | 13,459 | | 1.0% |
| 1920 | 13,237 | | −1.6% |
| 1930 | 12,159 | | −8.1% |
| 1940 | 9,982 | | −17.9% |
| 1950 | 8,778 | | −12.1% |
| 1960 | 8,714 | | −0.7% |
| 1970 | 8,867 | | 1.8% |
| 1980 | 9,301 | | 4.9% |
| 1990 | 8,862 | | −4.7% |
| 2000 | 9,403 | | 6.1% |
| 2010 | 9,124 | | −3.0% |
| 2020 | 9,429 | | 3.3% |
| 2025 (est.) | 9,678 | ▲ | 2.6% |
US Decennial Census; 1790-1960 1900-1990; 1990-2000 2010

=== 2020 census ===
As of the 2020 census, the county had a population of 9,429. The median age was 41.4 years. 25.5% of residents were under the age of 18 and 20.0% of residents were 65 years of age or older. For every 100 females there were 101.3 males, and for every 100 females age 18 and over there were 97.1 males age 18 and over.

The racial makeup of the county was 94.3% White, 0.3% Black or African American, 0.4% American Indian and Alaska Native, 0.2% Asian, 0.0% Native Hawaiian and Pacific Islander, 1.2% from some other race, and 3.6% from two or more races. Hispanic or Latino residents of any race comprised 3.4% of the population.

0.0% of residents lived in urban areas, while 100.0% lived in rural areas.

There were 3,715 households in the county, of which 31.4% had children under the age of 18 living with them and 19.0% had a female householder with no spouse or partner present. About 24.3% of all households were made up of individuals and 11.2% had someone living alone who was 65 years of age or older.

There were 4,088 housing units, of which 9.1% were vacant. Among occupied housing units, 78.4% were owner-occupied and 21.6% were renter-occupied. The homeowner vacancy rate was 1.1% and the rental vacancy rate was 8.2%.

=== 2000 census ===
As of the 2000 United States census, there were 9,403 people, 3,503 households, and 2,676 families residing in the county. The population density was 17 people per square mile (6.6 people/km^{2}). There were 3,850 housing units at an average density of 7 units per square mile (2.7/km^{2}).

The racial makeup of the county was 98.43% White, 0.18% Black or African American, 0.12% Native American, 0.22% Asian, 0.49% from other races, and 0.56% from two or more races. 1.14% of the population were Hispanic or Latino of any race.

There were 3,503 households, out of which 37.30% had children under the age of 18 living with them, 67.40% were married couples living together, 5.90% had a female householder with no husband present, and 23.60% were non-families. 21.10% of all households were made up of individuals, and 10.10% had someone living alone who was 65 years of age or older. The average household size was 2.64 and the average family size was 3.07.

The county population contained 29.10% under the age of 18, 5.90% from 18 to 24, 26.50% from 25 to 44, 23.20% from 45 to 64, and 15.30% who were 65 years of age or older. The median age was 38 years. For every 100 females there were 99.40 males. For every 100 females age 18 and over, there were 96.10 males.

The median income for a household in the county was $40,277, and the median income for a family was $45,659. Males had a median income of $29,238 versus $20,308 for females. The per capita income for the county was $17,590. About 5.90% of families and 7.50% of the population were below the poverty line, including 9.80% of those under age 18 and 5.40% of those age 65 or over.

== Communities ==
=== City ===
- Aurora (county seat)

=== Villages ===
- Giltner
- Hampton
- Hordville
- Marquette
- Phillips
- Stockham

=== Census-designated place ===
- Overland

== Politics ==
Hamilton County voters have long been reliably Republican. In only one national election since 1916 has the county selected the Democratic Party candidate.

United States presidential election results for Hamilton County, Nebraska
| Year | Republican | | Democratic | | Third party(ies) | |
| Year | No. | % | No. | % | No. | % |
|---|---|---|---|---|---|---|
| 1900 | 1,524 | 47.85% | 1,571 | 49.32% | 90 | 2.83% |
| 1904 | 1,845 | 61.38% | 551 | 18.33% | 610 | 20.29% |
| 1908 | 1,633 | 47.36% | 1,664 | 48.26% | 151 | 4.38% |
| 1912 | 450 | 14.57% | 1,433 | 46.41% | 1,205 | 39.02% |
| 1916 | 1,444 | 43.16% | 1,816 | 54.27% | 86 | 2.57% |
| 1920 | 2,950 | 66.89% | 1,356 | 30.75% | 104 | 2.36% |
| 1924 | 2,935 | 56.12% | 1,545 | 29.54% | 750 | 14.34% |
| 1928 | 3,634 | 68.77% | 1,606 | 30.39% | 44 | 0.83% |
| 1932 | 2,003 | 39.66% | 2,969 | 58.78% | 79 | 1.56% |
| 1936 | 2,748 | 50.43% | 2,653 | 48.69% | 48 | 0.88% |
| 1940 | 3,286 | 66.36% | 1,666 | 33.64% | 0 | 0.00% |
| 1944 | 3,057 | 69.68% | 1,330 | 30.32% | 0 | 0.00% |
| 1948 | 2,406 | 61.46% | 1,509 | 38.54% | 0 | 0.00% |
| 1952 | 3,579 | 76.00% | 1,130 | 24.00% | 0 | 0.00% |
| 1956 | 3,217 | 74.95% | 1,075 | 25.05% | 0 | 0.00% |
| 1960 | 3,249 | 72.65% | 1,223 | 27.35% | 0 | 0.00% |
| 1964 | 2,105 | 52.74% | 1,886 | 47.26% | 0 | 0.00% |
| 1968 | 2,592 | 70.94% | 918 | 25.12% | 144 | 3.94% |
| 1972 | 2,960 | 76.55% | 907 | 23.45% | 0 | 0.00% |
| 1976 | 2,737 | 65.46% | 1,337 | 31.98% | 107 | 2.56% |
| 1980 | 3,200 | 74.92% | 778 | 18.22% | 293 | 6.86% |
| 1984 | 3,418 | 79.77% | 842 | 19.65% | 25 | 0.58% |
| 1988 | 3,022 | 69.73% | 1,289 | 29.74% | 23 | 0.53% |
| 1992 | 2,388 | 51.72% | 994 | 21.53% | 1,235 | 26.75% |
| 1996 | 2,623 | 61.37% | 1,172 | 27.42% | 479 | 11.21% |
| 2000 | 3,251 | 72.39% | 1,066 | 23.74% | 174 | 3.87% |
| 2004 | 3,785 | 77.78% | 1,012 | 20.80% | 69 | 1.42% |
| 2008 | 3,389 | 70.62% | 1,332 | 27.76% | 78 | 1.63% |
| 2012 | 3,600 | 73.91% | 1,146 | 23.53% | 125 | 2.57% |
| 2016 | 3,783 | 75.60% | 878 | 17.55% | 343 | 6.85% |
| 2020 | 4,309 | 77.42% | 1,118 | 20.09% | 139 | 2.50% |
| 2024 | 4,416 | 79.24% | 1,067 | 19.15% | 90 | 1.61% |

== See also ==
- National Register of Historic Places listings in Hamilton County, Nebraska
