= Aurora, Nebraska =

- City
- Downtown Aurora in 2026

- Location of Aurora, Nebraska
- Coordinates: 40°51′53″N 98°00′27″W
- Country: United States
- State: Nebraska
- County: Hamilton
- Incorporated: July 3, 1877

Government
  - Type: Council/Mayor
  - Mayor: Marlin Seeman

Area
  - Total: 3.31 sq mi (8.58 km^{2})
  - Land: 3.28 sq mi (8.49 km^{2})
  - Water: 0.035 sq mi (0.09 km^{2})
- Elevation: 1,795 ft (547 m)

Population (2020)
  - Total: 4,678
  - Density: 1,426.9/sq mi (550.93/km^{2})
- Time zone: UTC-6 (Central (CST))
  - Summer (DST): UTC-5 (CDT)
- ZIP code: 68818
- Area code: 402
- FIPS code: 31-02690
- GNIS feature ID: 2394036
- Website: http://www.cityofaurora.org/

Aurora is a city in Hamilton County, Nebraska, United States. As of the 2020 census, Aurora had a population of 4,678. It is the county seat of Hamilton County.

== History ==
In 1861, David Millspaw became the first permanent settler in the area of what was to become Aurora. Hamilton County was formed in 1870.

Aurora was laid out as a town in 1871 by David Stone who named it after his former hometown of Aurora, Illinois. The county seat was transferred from Orville City (an extinct town) to Aurora in 1876.

== Geography ==
According to the United States Census Bureau, the city has a total area of 2.91 square miles (7.54 km^{2}), of which 2.90 square miles (7.51 km^{2}) is land and 0.01 square miles (0.03 km^{2}) is water. The average precipitation per year in Hamilton County during the years 1971 to 2000 was between 26 and 30 inches (660 and 760 mm).

Climate data for Aurora, Nebraska (1991-2020 normals)
Month	Jan	Feb	Mar	Apr	May	Jun	Jul	Aug	Sep	Oct	Nov	Dec	Year
Mean daily maximum °F (°C)	35.7 (2.1)	39.6 (4.2)	52.1 (11.2)	62.9 (17.2)	72.9 (22.7)	83.4 (28.6)	86.5 (30.3)	84.5 (29.2)	78.1 (25.6)	66.0 (18.9)	51.3 (10.7)	38.6 (3.7)	62.6 (17.0)
Daily mean °F (°C)	25.2 (−3.8)	29.0 (−1.7)	40.1 (4.5)	50.5 (10.3)	61.7 (16.5)	72.3 (22.4)	75.7 (24.3)	73.6 (23.1)	65.5 (18.6)	53.1 (11.7)	39.6 (4.2)	28.6 (−1.9)	51.2 (10.7)
Mean daily minimum °F (°C)	14.6 (−9.7)	18.4 (−7.6)	28.1 (−2.2)	38.1 (3.4)	50.6 (10.3)	61.2 (16.2)	64.9 (18.3)	62.8 (17.1)	53.0 (11.7)	40.2 (4.6)	28.0 (−2.2)	18.6 (−7.4)	39.9 (4.4)
Average precipitation inches (mm)	0.69 (18)	0.81 (21)	1.58 (40)	2.97 (75)	5.11 (130)	4.89 (124)	2.80 (71)	3.84 (98)	2.48 (63)	2.66 (68)	1.49 (38)	1.13 (29)	30.45 (775)
Average snowfall inches (cm)	7.2 (18)	5.6 (14)	4.1 (10)	2.2 (5.6)	0.0 (0.0)	0.0 (0.0)	0.0 (0.0)	0.0 (0.0)	0.1 (0.25)	1.2 (3.0)	2.9 (7.4)	3.8 (9.7)	27.1 (67.95)
Average extreme snow depth inches (cm)	4 (10)	6 (15)	1 (2.5)	1 (2.5)	0 (0)	0 (0)	0 (0)	0 (0)	0 (0)	0 (0)	1 (2.5)	3 (7.6)	6 (15)
Average precipitation days (≥ 0.01 in)	4.1	4.6	6.3	9	11.9	9.3	9.4	9	7.1	6.2	5.2	4.2	86.3
Average snowy days (≥ 0.01 in)	3.6	2.7	1.8	0.8	0	0	0	0	0.1	0.2	1.8	2.8	13.8
Source: NOAA (Snow depth 2013-2022)

== Demographics ==
Historical population
Census	Pop.	Note	%±
1890	1,862		—
1900	1,921		3.2%
1910	2,630		36.9%
1920	2,962		12.6%
1930	2,715		−8.3%
1940	2,419		−10.9%
1950	2,455		1.5%
1960	2,576		4.9%
1970	3,180		23.4%
1980	3,717		16.9%
1990	3,810		2.5%
2000	4,225		10.9%
2010	4,479		6.0%
2020	4,678		4.4%
U.S. Decennial Census; 2012 Estimate

=== 2020 census ===
As of the 2020 census, Aurora had a population of 4,678. The median age was 39.2 years. 27.4% of residents were under the age of 18 and 20.5% of residents were 65 years of age or older. For every 100 females there were 96.7 males, and for every 100 females age 18 and over there were 88.6 males age 18 and over.

0.0% of residents lived in urban areas, while 100.0% lived in rural areas.

There were 1,847 households in Aurora, of which 33.0% had children under the age of 18 living in them. Of all households, 55.4% were married-couple households, 15.1% were households with a male householder and no spouse or partner present, and 24.8% were households with a female householder and no spouse or partner present. About 28.1% of all households were made up of individuals and 12.9% had someone living alone who was 65 years of age or older.

There were 2,001 housing units, of which 7.7% were vacant. The homeowner vacancy rate was 1.1% and the rental vacancy rate was 10.5%.

Racial composition as of the 2020 census
Race	Number	Percent
White	4,398	94.0%
Black or African American	19	0.4%
American Indian and Alaska Native	20	0.4%
Asian	12	0.3%
Native Hawaiian and Other Pacific Islander	2	0.0%
Some other race	60	1.3%
Two or more races	167	3.6%
Hispanic or Latino (of any race)	194	4.1%

=== 2010 census ===
At the 2010 census, there were 4,479 people, 1,781 households and 1,199 families in the city. The population density was 1,544.5 inhabitants per square mile (596.3/km^{2}). There were 1,939 housing units at an average density of 668.6 per square mile (258.1/km^{2}). The racial makeup of the city was 97.7% White, 0.4% African American, 0.2% Native American, 0.2% Asian, 0.7% from other races, and 0.8% from two or more races. Hispanic or Latino of any race were 2.4% of the population.

There were 1,781 households, of which 33.7% had children under the age of 18 living with them, 55.7% were married couples living together, 8.5% had a female householder with no husband present, 3.1% had a male householder with no wife present, and 32.7% were non-families. 29.1% of all households were made up of individuals, and 15.3% had someone living alone who was 65 years of age or older. The average household size was 2.45 and the average family size was 3.00.

The median age in the city was 40.4 years. 26.5% of residents were under the age of 18; 5.7% were between the ages of 18 and 24; 23.3% were from 25 to 44; 25.7% were from 45 to 64; and 18.7% were 65 years of age or older. The gender makeup of the city was 48.4% male and 51.6% female.

=== 2000 census ===
At the 2000 census, there were 4,225 people, 1,662 households and 1,163 families residing in the city. The population density was 2,243.0 inhabitants per square mile (866.0/km^{2}). There were 1,798 housing units at an average density of 954.5 per square mile (368.5/km^{2}). The racial makeup of the city was 97.92% White, 0.19% African American, 0.05% Native American, 0.43% Asian, 0.57% from other races, and 0.85% from two or more races. Hispanic or Latino of any race were 1.56% of the population.

There were 1,662 households, of which 34.9% had children under the age of 18 living with them, 59.3% were married couples living together, 7.8% had a female householder with no husband present, and 30.0% were non-families. 27.1% of all households were made up of individuals, and 14.1% had someone living alone who was 65 years of age or older. The average household size was 2.45 and the average family size was 2.98.

27.4% of the population were under the age of 18, 6.2% from 18 to 24, 25.7% from 25 to 44, 20.9% from 45 to 64, and 19.7% who were 65 years of age or older. The median age was 39 years. For every 100 females, there were 90.8 males. For every 100 females age 18 and over, there were 84.6 males.

The median household income was $37,690 and the median family income was $43,884. Males had a median income of $29,162 compared with $20,484 for females. The per capita income for the city was $17,309. About 6.1% of families and 6.2% of the population were below the poverty line, including 7.4% of those under age 18 and 5.4% of those age 65 or over.

== Education ==
=== Public schools ===
Aurora is served by Aurora Public Schools

- Aurora High School (grades 9 though 12)
- Aurora Middle School (grades 6 through 8)
- Aurora Elementary School (grades PreK through 5)

== Media ==
=== Radio ===
- KRGY 97.3FM

=== Newspaper ===
- Aurora News-Register

== Notable people ==
- Silas Reynolds Barton, U.S. Representative from Nebraska
- Nate Boerkircher, football player
- Harold Eugene Edgerton, inventor of the strobe light
- Eugene Jerome Hainer, U.S. Representative from Nebraska
- Bob Kremer, Nebraska state senator
- Tom Kropp, professional basketball player
- Clarence Mitchell, Major League Baseball player
- Terese Nielsen, freelance fantasy artist
- Baylor Scheierman, professional basketball player
- Harry Scott Smith, entomologist and educator
- Ron Spencer, artist for Magic: The Gathering
- William Ledyard Stark, populist politician
- Marion Van Berg, thoroughbred trainer in Racing Hall of Fame
