= Amanda McGill =

American politician (born 1980)

Amanda McGill Johnson
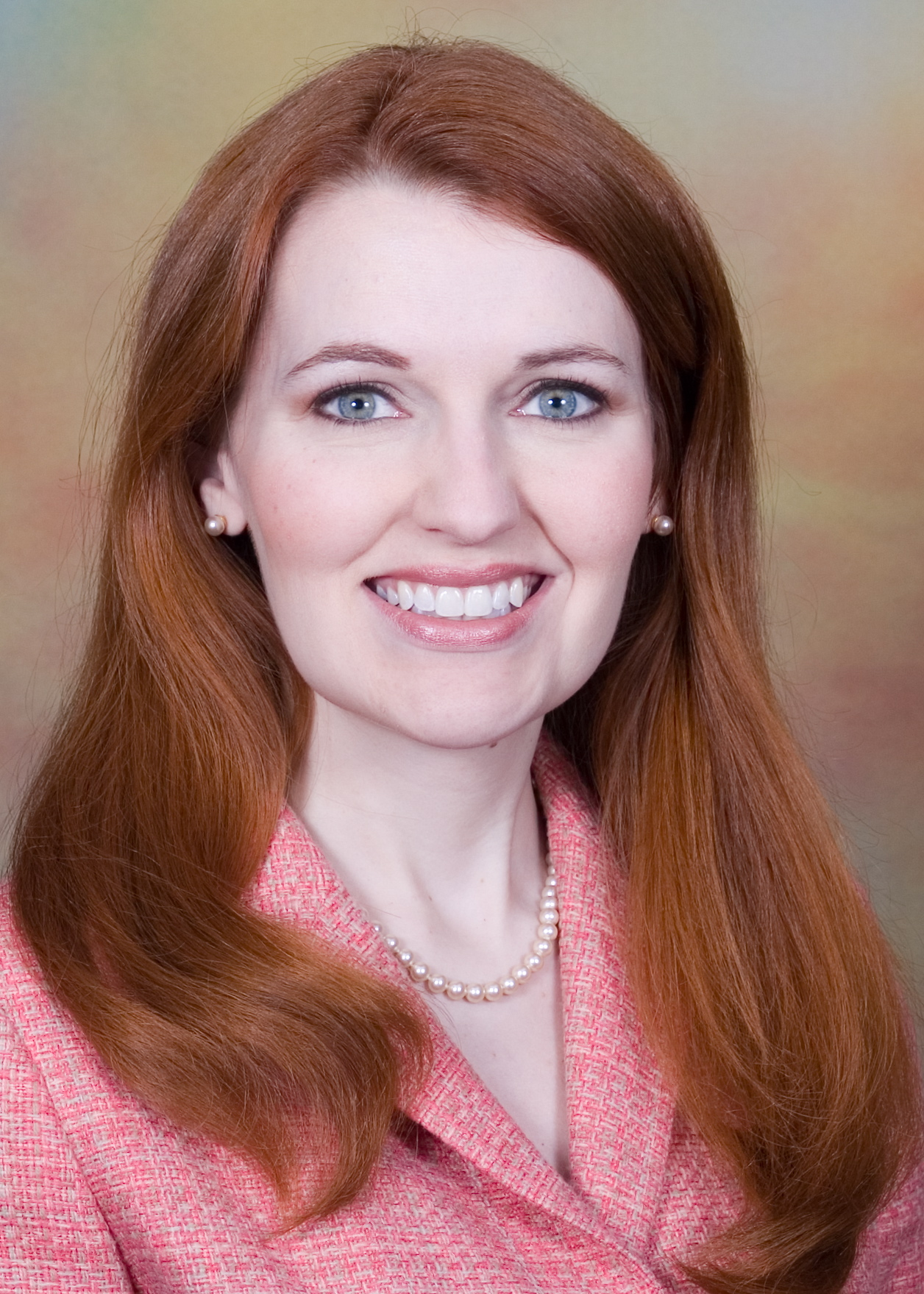

Member of the Nebraska Legislature from the 26th district
- In office January 3, 2007 – January 7, 2015
- Preceded by: Marian Price
- Succeeded by: Matt Hansen

Personal details
- Born: March 21, 1980 (age 46) Omaha, Nebraska
- Party: Democratic
- Education: University of Nebraska–Lincoln

Amanda McGill Johnson (born March 21, 1980) is a politician from the state of Nebraska in the Midwestern United States. From 2007 to 2015, she represented a Lincoln district in the Nebraska Legislature. She has served on the Millard Public Schools Board of Education since 2017. In 2020, she published her first children's book Unicameral and You: Collaborating for the Common Good in Nebraska's Capitol.

== Early life, education and career ==
Born in Omaha, she graduated from Millard North High School in 1998 and went on to the University of Nebraska–Lincoln where she graduated in 2002.

She was a television reporter for KCAU in Sioux City in 2003 and KOLN in Lincoln from 2004 to 2005. She then became communications director for the Nebraska Democratic Party until she decided to run for office. She served as District Director to Rep. Brad Ashford and became Executive Director of Nebraska Cures in 2019.

== Political career ==
Senator McGill was elected to the Legislature in 2006 serving Nebraska's 26th legislative district and served as the Chair of the Urban Affairs Committee from the fall of 2009 until she was term limited out of office. She also served on the Business and Labor and Judiciary Committees.

She ran as the Democratic Party's candidate for Nebraska State Auditor in 2014, losing to Republican candidate Charlie Janssen.

She successfully ran for the Millard Public Schools Board of Education in 2016 and won re-election in 2020.

Party political offices
Vacant Title last held by Kate Witek	Democratic nominee for Nebraska State Auditor; 2014	Succeeded by Jane Skinner
