= 2006 Nebraska gubernatorial election =

- November 7, 2006
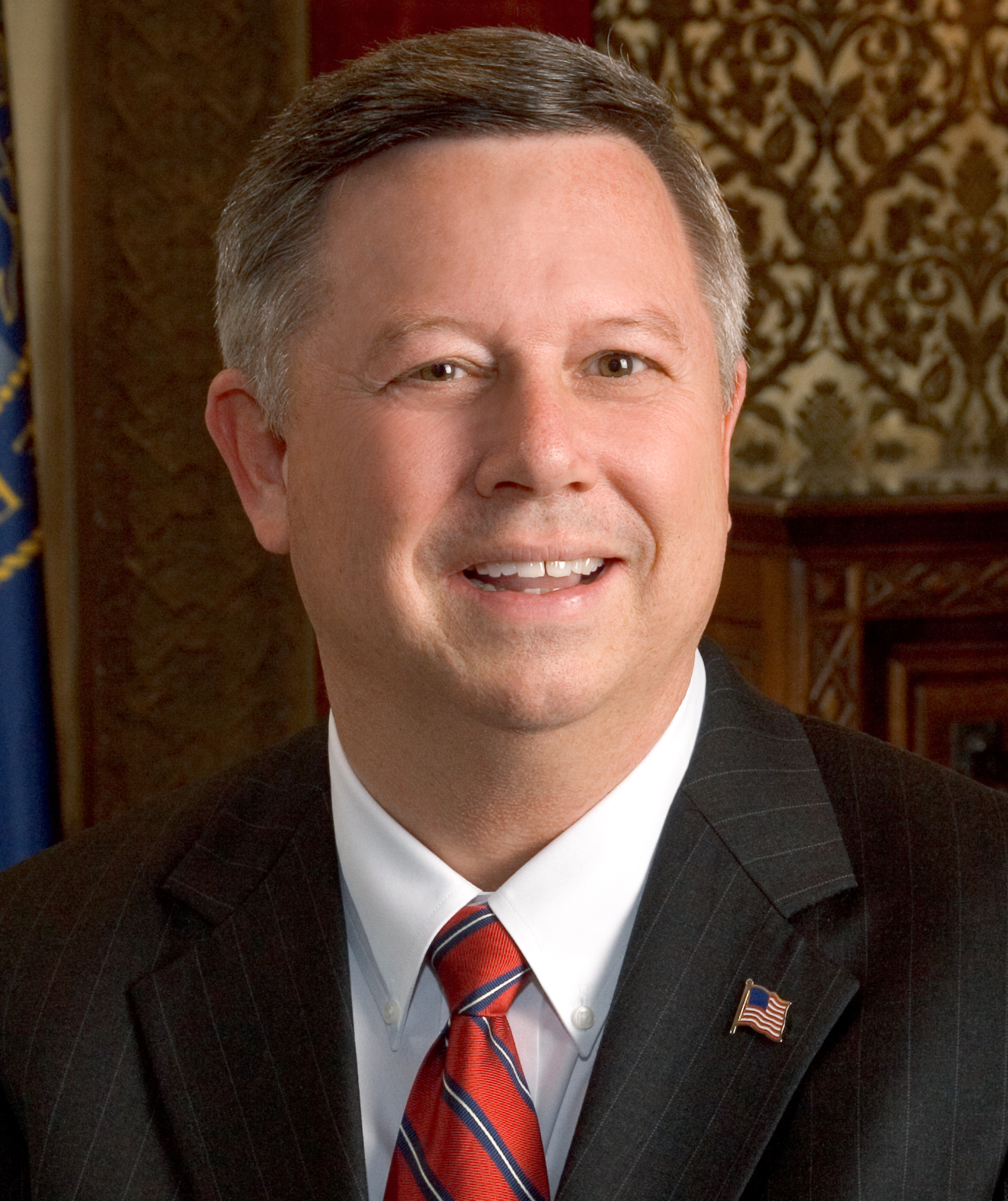

Nominee	Dave Heineman	David Hahn
Party	Republican	Democratic
Running mate	Rick Sheehy	Steve Loschen
Popular vote	434,802	144,624
Percentage	73.40%	24.46%
- Heineman: 40–50% 50–60% 60–70% 70–80% 80–90% >90% Hahn: 40–50% 50–60% 60–70% 70–80% 80–90% >90% Tie: 40–50% 50% No votes
Governor before election
Dave Heineman
Republican
Elected Governor
Dave Heineman
Republican

The 2006 Nebraska gubernatorial election was held on November 7, 2006; the primary election was held on May 9, 2006. Republican incumbent Dave Heineman was re-elected to a full term, defeating Democrat David Hahn.

== Republican primary ==
=== Candidates ===
- Dave Heineman, incumbent Governor of Nebraska
- Dave Nabity, financial consultant, former Young Republicans state chair
- Tom Osborne, U.S. Congressman, former football coach

=== Campaign ===
The Republican primary election had the unusual situation of an incumbent running against several members of his own party. Originally, the 2006 election would not have had an incumbent. However, this changed when Mike Johanns resigned in January 2005 to become United States Secretary of Agriculture; this elevated Lieutenant Governor Dave Heineman to the governorship. He then announced his intention to run for election to a full four-year term. The other two candidates for the Republican nomination were former Nebraska Cornhuskers football coach Tom Osborne—then serving in the United States House of Representatives—and Omaha businessman Dave Nabity.

In 2005, the three Republican candidates raised more than $2 million overall for their campaigns: Osborne $972,000; Heineman $922,000; and Nabity $150,000.

Osborne named Kate Witek, the Nebraska State Auditor, as his running mate for the office of lieutenant governor. She had previously been the running mate of Gene Spence in the 1994 Nebraska gubernatorial election. After the Osborne-Witek ticket was unsuccessful in the Republican primaries, Witek switched parties and joined the Democratic party.

=== Results ===
Primary results by county. Map legend: Heineman—70–80%; Heineman—60–70%; Heineman—50–60%; Heineman—40–50%; Osborne—40–50%; Osborne—50–60%

Republican Party primary results
Party	Candidate	Votes	%
Republican	Dave Heineman (incumbent)	138,216	50.26
Republican	Tom Osborne	121,973	44.36
Republican	Dave Nabity	14,786	5.38
Total votes		274,975	100.00

== Democratic primary ==
=== Candidates ===
- Glenn R. Boot Jr., truck driver
- David Hahn, attorney and internet development company CEO

=== Campaign ===
The Democratic primary election did not have any candidates until December 2005, when David Hahn announced his candidacy. Glenn Boot Jr. of Ashland was the other Democratic candidate, but he was disqualified due to a previous felony conviction. The election was not a high priority for Nebraska Democrats. While the main reason was focusing on getting U.S. Senator Ben Nelson reelected, it was very likely that most Democrats didn't want to face the possibility of running against the immensely popular Osborne.

=== Results ===
Democratic Party primary results
Party	Candidate	Votes	%
Democratic	David Hahn	68,004	91.57
Democratic	Glenn R. Boot, Jr.	6,259	8.43
Total votes		74,263	100.00

== Nebraska Party primary ==
=== Candidates ===
- Barry Richards, farmer

=== Results ===
Nebraska Party primary results
Party	Candidate	Votes	%
Nebraska	Barry Richards	138	100.00
Total votes		138	100.00

== Independent candidates ==
- Mort Sullivan, perennial candidate

== General election ==
=== Predictions ===
Source	Ranking	As of
The Cook Political Report	Solid R	November 6, 2006
Sabato's Crystal Ball	Safe R	November 6, 2006
Rothenberg Political Report	Safe R	November 2, 2006
Real Clear Politics	Safe R	November 6, 2006

=== Polling ===
Source	Date	Dave Heineman (R)	David Hahn (D)
Rasmussen	October 19, 2006	70%	22%
Rasmussen	September 26, 2006	72%	18%
Rasmussen	August 17, 2006	71%	18%
Rasmussen	July 17, 2006	66%	21%

=== Results ===
Nebraska gubernatorial election, 2006
Party	Candidate	Votes	%	±%
Republican	Dave Heineman (incumbent)	435,507	73.40%	+4.72%
Democratic	David Hahn	145,115	24.46%	−3.06%
Nebraska	Barry Richards	8,953	1.51%	−2.29%
Independent	Mort Sullivan	3,782	0.64%	
Majority		290,392	48.94%	+7.78%
Turnout		593,357		
Republican hold		Swing		

==== By County ====
By county

County	Person Democratic		Person Republican		Various candidates Other parties		Margin		Total votes
County	#	%	#	%	#	%	#	%	Total votes
Adams County									
Antelope County									
Arthur County									
Banner County									
Blaine County									
Boone County									
Box Butte County									
Boyd County									
Brown County									
Buffalo County									
Burt County									
Butler County									
Cass County									
Cedar County									
Chase County									
Cherry County									
Cheyenne County									
Clay County									
Colfax County									
Cuming County									
Custer County									
Dakota County									
Dawes County									
Dawson County									
Deuel County									
Dixon County									
Dodge County									
Douglas County									
Dundy County									
Fillmore County									
Franklin County									
Frontier County									
Furnas County									
Gage County									
Garden County									
Garfield County									
Gosper County									
Grant County									
Greeley County									
Hall County									
Hamilton County									
Hayes County									
Hitchcock County									
Holt County									
Hooker County									
Howard County									
Jefferson County									
Johnson County									
Kearney County									
Keith County									
Keya Paha County									
Kimball County									
Knox County									
Lancaster County									
Lincoln County									
Logan County									
Loup County									
Madison County									
McPherson County									
Merrick County									
Morrill County									
Nance County									
Nance County									
Nemaha County									
Nuckolls County									
Otoe County									
Pawnee County									
Perkins County									
Phelps County									
Pierce County									
Platte County									
Polk County									
Red Willow County									
Richardson County									
Rock County									
Saline County									
Sarpy County									
Saunders County									
Scotts Bluff County									
Seward County									
Sheridan County									
Sioux County									
Stanton County									
Thayer County									
Stanton County									
Thurston County									
Valley County									
Washington County									
Wayne County									
Webster County									
Wheeler County									
York County									
Totals									

== See also ==
- Nebraska United States Senate election, 2006
- U.S. gubernatorial elections, 2006
