= Shane Osborn =

American politician (born 1974)

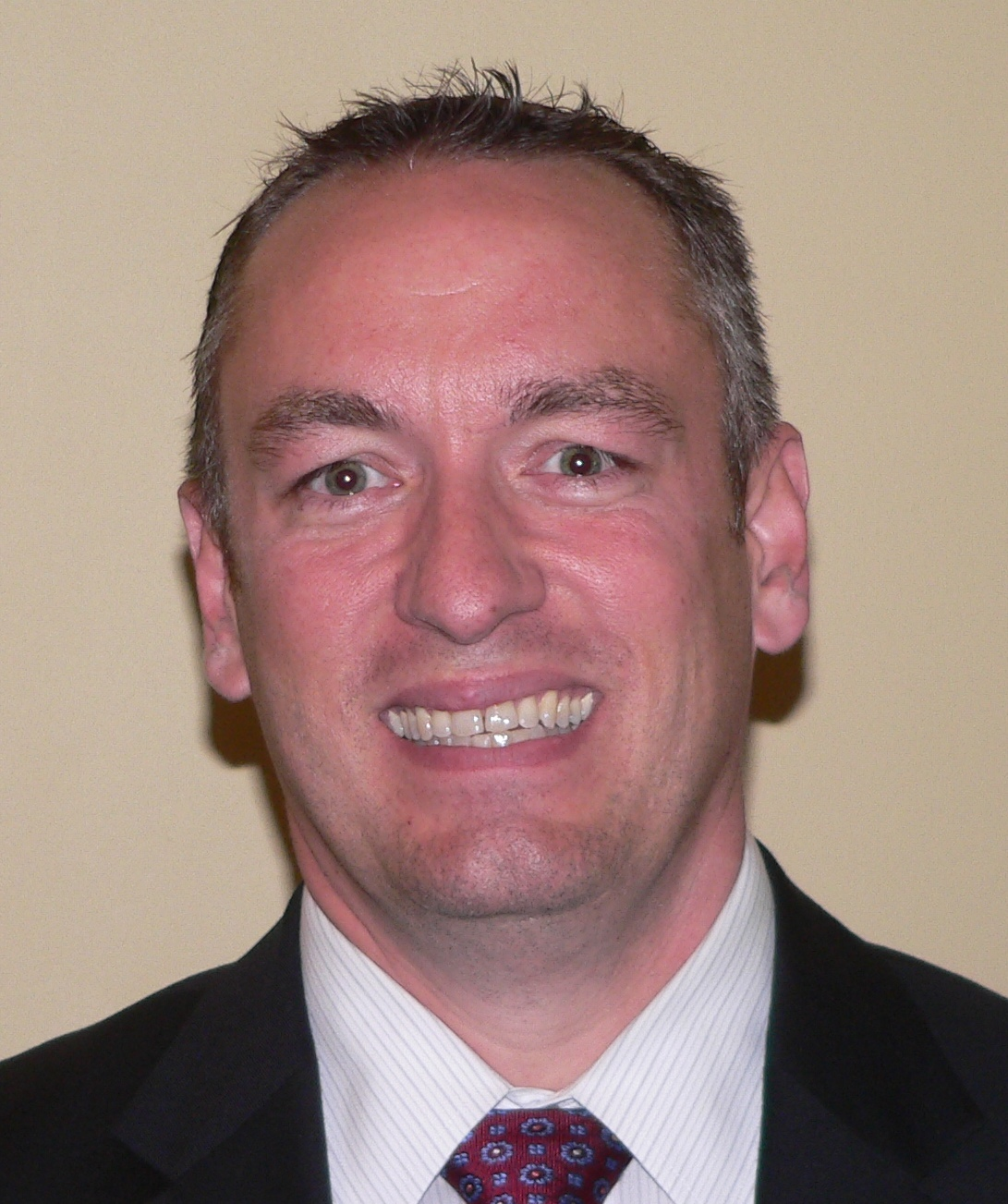
- Osborn in 2013

40th Treasurer of Nebraska
- In office January 4, 2007 – January 6, 2011
- Governor: Dave Heineman
- Preceded by: Ron Ross
- Succeeded by: Don Stenberg

Personal details
- Born: June 21, 1974 (age 52) Loomis, South Dakota, U.S.
- Party: Republican
- Website: website

Military service
- Branch/service: United States Navy
- Rank: Lieutenant commander

Shane Osborn (born June 21, 1974) is an American politician and naval aviator who served as the 42nd Nebraska State Treasurer from 2007 to 2011. He is a member of the Republican Party. He was the U.S. pilot during the Hainan Island incident.

== Military career ==
Osborn graduated from Norfolk High School in 1992 and then attended the University of Nebraska–Lincoln on a Naval ROTC scholarship. After graduating in 1996 with a degree in statistics and actuarial science, Osborn was commissioned as an ensign in the United States Navy and entered flight training in Florida and Texas. Subsequently designated as a naval aviator, he was eventually assigned to the Fleet Air Reconnaissance Squadron One (VQ-1) "World Watchers" at NAS Whidbey Island, Washington, flying the EP-3E Aries aircraft.

On April 1, 2001, then-Lieutenant Osborn was an Electronic Warfare Aircraft Commander piloting an EP-3E aircraft with a 23-member crew near Chinese airspace when a Chinese J-8IIM jet fighter that had intercepted the U.S. aircraft collided with the EP-3E. The EP-3E's propeller cut the J-8 in half and its pilot was killed. The fighter's nose section cartwheeled upward, smashing into the EP-3E's nose and tearing off its radome. The impact sent the EP-3 plane into an inverted dive, dropping 8,000 feet in 30 seconds and falling another 6,000 feet before Osborn had the EP-3E's nose up and wings level. In a September 2003 article in the Naval Aviation News, Osborn told Jim Turnbull that once he regained control of the plane he "called for the crew to prepare to bail out." They donned parachutes and initiated an emergency destruct plan, which included destroying intelligence equipment and sensitive documents on board.

After an emergency landing at the Lingshui Air Base on Hainan Island, Osborn and his crew were taken to a Chinese military barracks where they were detained and interrogated for 12 days. The aircraft was dismantled by American engineers after much negotiation between the countries and returned to the US in boxes after months of scrutiny by Chinese officials. On April 12, 2001 the crew were released from Chinese custody and returned to the United States. After the Hainan Island incident, Osborn was awarded the Distinguished Flying Cross.

In 2005, Osborn left the Regular Navy as a Lieutenant Commander after nine years of active duty and entered the Navy Reserve.

=== Distinguished Flying Cross citation ===
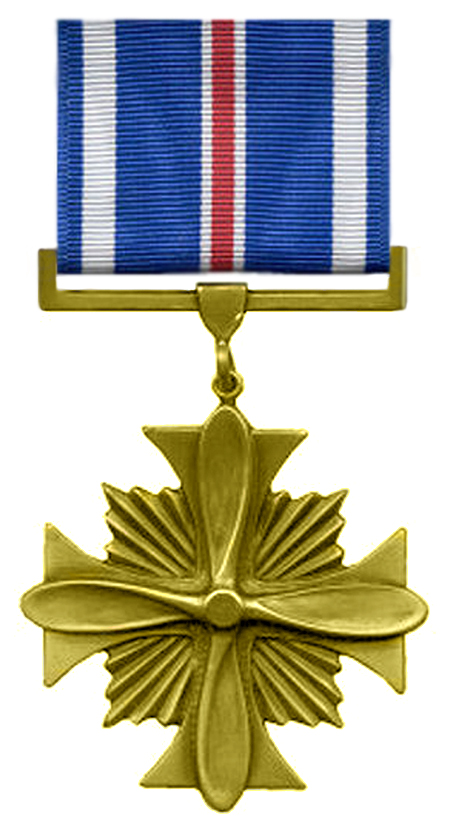

The President of the United States of America takes pleasure in presenting the Distinguished Flying Cross to Lieutenant Shane J. Osborn, United States Navy, for extraordinary achievement while participating in aerial flight as EP-3 Electronic Warfare Aircraft Commander/Mission Commander, Fleet Air Reconnaissance Squadron ONE during sensitive surveillance operations on 1 April 2001. During a mission in direct support of U.S. National Security interests, following an in-flight collision with a People's Republic of China fighter aircraft. Lieutenant Osborn displayed superb airmanship and courage. Despite extreme damage to the aircraft, including loss of an engine, nose radio, all airspeed and altitude information, and structural damage to forward portions of the fuselage and control surfaces, he heroically regained control, directed appropriate emergency procedures, and coordinated the crew's efforts to safely land the aircraft. Lieutenant Osborn's dedicated efforts ultimately ensured the survival of twenty-four crew members and preserved a vital operational asset. By his superb airmanship, proven ability to perform under pressure, and steadfast devotion to duty, Lieutenant Osborn reflected great credit upon himself and upheld the highest traditions of the United States Naval Service.

== Political career ==
=== State treasurer ===
In 2006, Osborn won the Republican nomination for the office of Nebraska State Treasurer by defeating Republican incumbent Ron Ross, who had been appointed to the position on January 6, 2004 by Governor Mike Johanns. In the primary election, Osborn received 148,355 votes to Ross's 85,541, for a 63.4%–36.6% victory. In the general election, Osborn obtained 410,459 votes to Nebraska Party candidate John H. Gaithings's 127,586 votes, winning 76.3%–23.7%.

In 2007, the Aspen Institute selected Osborn to be a part of their Aspen-Rodell Fellows Program in Public Leadership and was also elected vice president of the National Association of Unclaimed Property Administrators. He is also a shareholder with the SilverStone Group, a financial services firm in Omaha, Nebraska.

During his tenure in office, Osborn reduced the state treasurer's budget by 12.8 percent.

In September 2009, Osborn announced he would not seek re-election for Nebraska State Treasurer.

=== 2014 U.S. Senate campaign ===
On June 2, 2013, Osborn announced that he would seek election to the U.S. Senate from Nebraska, after incumbent Senator Mike Johanns announced that he would retire after one term. Osborn lost the May 13, 2014, primary to Ben Sasse.

Party political offices
Preceded by Lorelee Hunt Byrd	Republican nominee for Nebraska State Treasurer; 2006	Succeeded by Don Stenberg
Political offices
Preceded by Ron Ross	Treasurer of Nebraska; 2007–2011	Succeeded by Don Stenberg
