= Mike Foley (Nebraska politician) =

American politician (born 1954)

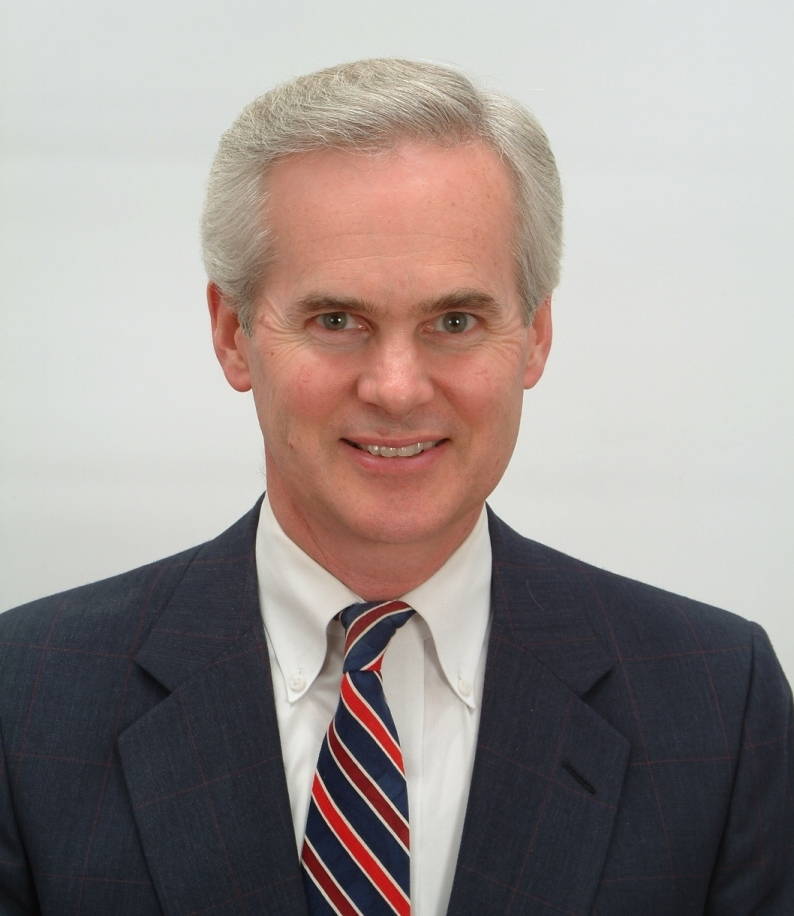
- Foley in 2006

24th and 26th Auditor of Nebraska
- Incumbent
- Assumed office January 5, 2023
- Governor: Jim Pillen
- Preceded by: Charlie Janssen
- In office January 3, 2007 – January 8, 2015
- Governor: Dave Heineman
- Preceded by: Kate Witek
- Succeeded by: Charlie Janssen

41st Lieutenant Governor of Nebraska
- In office January 8, 2015 – January 5, 2023
- Governor: Pete Ricketts
- Preceded by: John Nelson
- Succeeded by: Joe Kelly

62nd Chair of the National Lieutenant Governors Association
- In office 2021–2022
- Preceded by: Bethany Hall-Long
- Succeeded by: Juliana Stratton

Member of the Nebraska Legislature from the 29th district
- In office January 3, 2001 – January 3, 2007
- Preceded by: LaVon Crosby
- Succeeded by: Tony Fulton

Personal details
- Born: April 5, 1954 (age 72) Rochester, New York, U.S.
- Party: Republican
- Education: State University of New York, Brockport (BA); Michigan State University (MBA)

Michael D. Foley (born April 5, 1954) is an American politician who has served as the Nebraska State Auditor since 2023, having previously served in the same position from 2007 to 2015. A member of the Republican Party, he was the 41st lieutenant governor of Nebraska under Governor Pete Ricketts between 2015 and 2023, and a member of the Nebraska Legislature from 2001 to 2007.

== Personal life ==
Foley was born in Rochester, New York and graduated from Bishop Kearney High School in 1972, the State University of New York at Brockport in 1976, and Michigan State University with an M.B.A. He held summer positions in the offices of the United States Department of Transportation and the United States International Trade Commission. For 18 years, he was the director of financial analysis for the National Association of Regulatory Utility Commissioners in Washington, DC. Prior to that position he was a consultant with Kirschner Associates.

He is married to Nebraska native Susan (Seiker) Foley. They have six children and are members of St. Peter's Catholic Church in Lincoln, Nebraska.

== Nebraska Legislature ==
Foley was elected in 2000 to represent the 29th Nebraska legislative district, and reelected in 2004 with 70% of the vote. He sat on the Judiciary and the Transportation and Telecommunications committees. He resigned in January, 2007 to become state auditor after winning a statewide election for that position in the 2006 election cycle.

In 2005, senator Foley opposed two bills prohibiting the state government's discriminating on the basis of sexual orientation; regarding the measures, he stated, "[H]omosexual conduct is wrong. And it's OK to think that it is wrong. And it is OK to say that it is wrong."

== Auditor of Public Accounts ==
On November 7, 2006, Foley defeated incumbent Democrat Kate Witek to become the Nebraska Auditor of Public Accounts. In 2010 he was re-elected to a second term with 80% of the statewide vote.

== Lieutenant Governor of Nebraska ==
Pete Ricketts selected Foley to replace Lavon Heidemann as his running mate in the 2014 Nebraska governor's race. The ticket ran successfully again in 2018.

Party political offices
Preceded by Kate Witek	Republican nominee for Auditor of Nebraska; 2006, 2010	Succeeded by Charlie Janssen
Preceded by Lavon Heidemann	Republican nominee for Lieutenant Governor of Nebraska; 2014, 2018	Succeeded by Joe Kelly
Preceded by Charlie Janssen	Republican nominee for Auditor of Nebraska; 2022, 2026	Most recent
Political offices
Preceded by Kate Witek	Auditor of Nebraska; 2007–2015	Succeeded by Charlie Janssen
Preceded by John Nelson	Lieutenant Governor of Nebraska; 2015–2023	Succeeded by Joe Kelly
Preceded by Charlie Janssen	Auditor of Nebraska; 2023–present	Incumbent
