= Mark Quandahl =

American politician

Mark Quandahl (born 1961) is an Omaha attorney appointed by Governor Pete Ricketts as the director of Nebraska Department of Banking and Finance, a former member of the Nebraska State Board of Education representing District 2, and the former chairman of the Nebraska Republican Party.

Born in Omaha, he graduated from Ralston High School in 1980. He graduated from the University of Nebraska–Lincoln in 1984 and obtained his law degree from the University of Nebraska College of Law in 1987.

He was appointed to the Nebraska Legislature in 1999 by Governor Ben Nelson to fill out the term of newly elected state auditor Kate Witek. He was elected in 2000 to represent Nebraska's 31st Legislative District. During his tenure in the legislature he served as the chairman of the Banking, Commerce, and Insurance Committee.

After retiring from the legislature in 2004, Quandahl was elected chairman of the Nebraska Republican Party in February 2005, to succeed David Kramer, who was running for United States Senate. He was unanimously reelected as state party chairman in 2007 with his term concluding in January 2009. He did not seek a third term and was succeeded by Lincoln attorney, Mark Fahleson. Quandahl was elected as a Nebraska delegate to the 2004 Republican National Convention in New York, New York, and he, also, served as a Nebraska super-delegate to the 2008 Republican National Convention in St. Paul, Minnesota, as a Delegate for President George W. Bush and John McCain at each of the respective conventions.

On August 17, 2009, Governor Dave Heineman appointed him to serve the remaining term of Nebraska State Board of Education member, Kerry Winterer, who resigned to become the CEO at the Nebraska Department of Health and Human Services in July 2009. The district includes Cass, Saunders, and Washington Counties, as well as portions of Douglas and Sarpy Counties. Quandahl completed the term representing District 2 in January 2014.

In December 2014 newly elected Nebraska governor Pete Ricketts nominated Quandahl to serve as the state's director of banking and finance. Quandahl continues to serve as Nebraska's leading banking industry regulator.

Preceded by Kerry Winterer	Nebraska State Board of Education, District 2 Member; 2009–2014	Succeeded by Glen Flint
Preceded by David J. Kramer	Chairman, Nebraska Republican Party; 2005–2009	Succeeded by Mark Fahleson
Preceded by Kate Witek	Nebraska state senator-District 31; 1999–2005	Succeeded by Rich Pahls
