= Dennis Byars =

American politician (1940–2022)

Dennis Michael Byars (August 23, 1940 – April 14, 2022) was an American politician who was a state senator in the Nebraska Legislature and director of Beatrice Community Hospital Foundation.

== Personal life ==
Byars was born August 23, 1940, in Beatrice, Nebraska, and graduated from Beatrice High School in 1958 and attended the University of Nebraska. He served as a 1st lieutenant in the Nebraska Army National Guard. He has belonged to many groups dealing with people with developmental disabilities and other Gage County, and Beatrice organizations. Byars served on the Beatrice School Board and on the Gage County, Nebraska Board of Supervisors.

== State legislature ==
Byars was appointed on December 19, 1988, to replace Patricia S. Morehead, who had resigned. He was elected in 1990 to represent the 30th Nebraska legislative district but did not run in 1994. He ran and won in 1998 and 2002, and was the vice chairperson of both the Education and Health and Human Services committees while serving in this period. He was term limited out of office in 2007.

Preceded by Patricia S. Morehead	Nebraska state senator-district 30; 1988 - 1995	Succeeded by David Maurstad
Preceded by David Maurstad	Nebraska state senator-district 30; 1999 - 2007	Succeeded by Norm Wallman
