= Senator Morehead =

Senator Morehead may refer to:

- James Turner Morehead (Kentucky politician) (1797–1854), U.S. Senator from Kentucky
- James Turner Morehead (North Carolina politician) (1799–1875), North Carolina State Senate
- John H. Morehead (1861–1942), Nebraska State Senate
- Patricia S. Morehead (born 1936), Nebraska State Senate

== See also ==
- Tom Van Horn Moorehead (1898–1979), Ohio State Senate
