= 2026 Nebraska State Auditor election =

- November 3, 2026
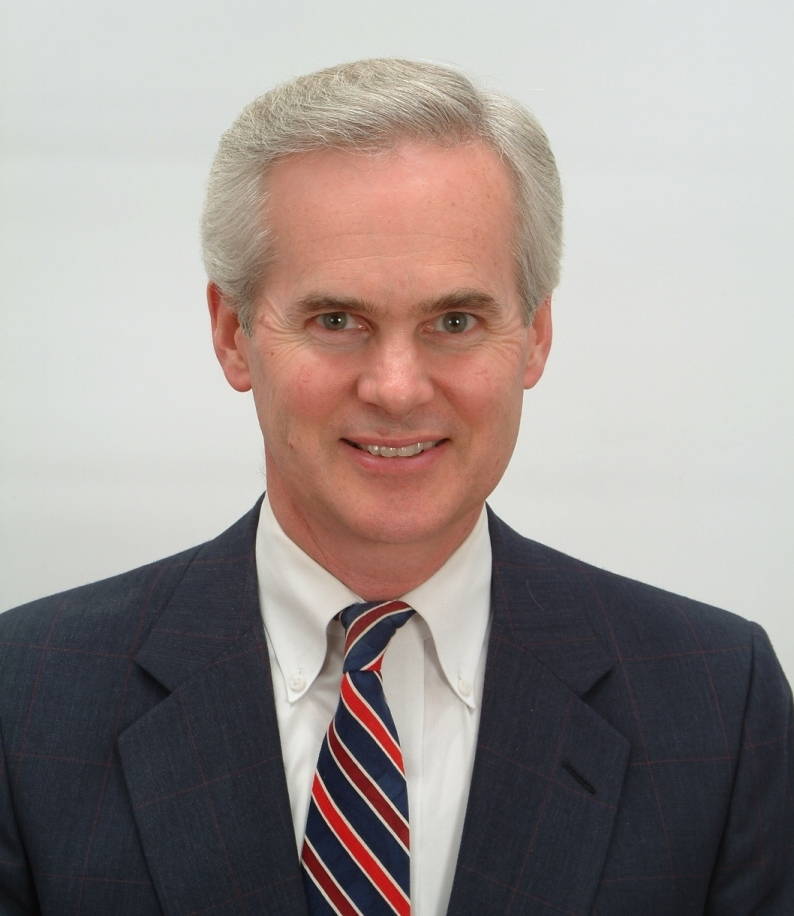

| Nominee | Mike Foley | John Knight |
| Party | Republican | America First |
| Popular vote | 505,804 | 174,992 |
| Percentage | 74.30% | 25.70% |
State Auditor before election
Mike Foley
Republican
Elected State Auditor
Mike Foley
Republican

The 2026 Nebraska State Auditor election took place on November 3, 2026, to elect the state auditor of Nebraska. Incumbent Republican state auditor Mike Foley won re-election to a second consecutive term in office.

== Republican primary ==
=== Candidates ===
==== Nominee ====
- Mike Foley, incumbent state auditor

=== Results ===
Republican primary
| Party | Candidate | Votes | % |
|---|---|---|---|
| Republican | Mike Foley (incumbent) | 165,602 | 100.0 |
| Total votes | | 165,602 | 100.0 |

== America First Party ==
=== Nominee ===
- John Knight, secretary of the America First Party

== General election ==
=== Results ===
2026 Nebraska State Auditor election
| Party | Candidate | Votes | % | ±% |
|---|---|---|---|---|
| Republican | Mike Foley (incumbent) | | | |
| America First | John Knight | | | |
| Total votes | | | 100.0 | |

== See also ==
- 2026 United States state auditor elections
- 2026 Nebraska elections
