= Rich Pahls =

American politician (1943–2022)

Member of the Nebraska Legislature from the 31st district
- In office January 6, 2021 – April 27, 2022
- Preceded by: Rick Kolowski
- Succeeded by: Kathleen Kauth
- In office January 5, 2005 – January 2, 2013
- Preceded by: Mark Quandahl
- Succeeded by: Rick Kolowski

Member of the Omaha City Council from the 5th District
- In office January 2, 2013 – January 5, 2021
- Preceded by: Jean Stothert
- Succeeded by: Colleen Brennan

Personal details
- Born: August 7, 1943 Jewell, Kansas, U.S.
- Died: April 27, 2022 (aged 78)
- Party: Republican
- Education: Fort Hays State University (BA, MA); University of Nebraska–Lincoln (EdD)

Rich Pahls (August 7, 1943 – April 27, 2022) was an American politician and educator from the state of Nebraska representing an Omaha district. He served two full terms in the Nebraska Legislature, from 2005 to 2013. He was subsequently re-elected to the Nebraska Legislature in 2020, serving a partial term from 2021 until his death in 2022.

Pahls graduated from Fort Hays State University in 1966 with a B.A. and in 1967 with an M.A., and from the University of Nebraska–Lincoln with an Ed. D in 1979.

== State legislature ==
Pahls was elected to the Legislature in 2004, representing the 31st Nebraska legislative district. He served as Chairman of the Banking, Commerce and Insurance Committee, and as a member of the Government, and Military and Veterans' Affairs Committee, the Executive Board of the Legislative Council, and the Education Commission of the States.

Pahls was re-elected in 2020.

== City council ==
In May 2013, he was elected to the Omaha City Council. In May 2017, he was re-elected for another four-year term. Pahls resigned from the council on January 5, 2021, in order to serve in the Nebraska Legislature. He died of cancer on April 27, 2022, at the age of 78, while still in office.

== Sources ==
- "Nebraska Unicameral Legislature". Sen. Rich Pahls.
