= Matt Hansen =

American politician (born 1988)

- Hansen in 2018

Member of the Nebraska Legislature from the 26th district
- In office January 7, 2015 – January 4, 2023
- Preceded by: Amanda McGill
- Succeeded by: George Dungan

Personal details
- Born: February 11, 1988 (age 38) Morgantown, West Virginia
- Party: Democratic
- Education: University of Nebraska–Lincoln(B.A.); University of Nebraska College of Law(J.D.)
- Profession: Attorney

Matthew V. "Matt" Hansen (born February 11, 1988) is a politician from the state of Nebraska in the Midwestern United States. In 2014, he was elected to the Nebraska Legislature, representing a Lincoln district. Hansen is a member of the Democratic Party.

== Personal life and professional career ==
Hansen was born February 11, 1988, in Morgantown, West Virginia. He was raised in Lincoln, and graduated from Lincoln Southwest High School in 2006. He attended the University of Nebraska–Lincoln, receiving a B.A. in psychology and political science in 2010; he then attended the University of Nebraska College of Law, from which he received a J.D. in 2013.

As of late 2013, Hansen taught sociology and math one-on-one to gifted students as a mentor for Lincoln Public Schools. He sat on the board of the University Place Community Organization and on Lincoln's Cable Advisory Board.

== Political career ==
=== 2014 election ===
==== 2014 primary ====
In November 2013, Hansen announced that he would run in the 2014 election for a seat in the Nebraska state legislature, representing the 26th District in northeastern Lincoln. The incumbent, Democrat Amanda McGill, was precluded by Nebraska's term-limits law from running for a third consecutive term.

Hansen was one of four Democrats seeking the position. Larry Weixelman was a University of Nebraska–Lincoln employee who also owned a market-analysis and software company that worked to promote tourism in Nebraska. Justin Valencia, an attorney, was an adjunct professor at Bellevue University. Bob Van Valkenburg, a 78-year-old described as a "perennial candidate", had been a registered Republican but had changed his registration to Democrat in recent years; he stated that he was running because of his dislike for one of the other candidates, and because being in the Legislature was on his "bucket list".

A single Republican was also in the race. Brent Smoyer, an attorney, worked as an aide for state legislator Scott Lautenbaugh. Smoyer had run for the Legislature from another Lincoln district in 2008, but had been eliminated after placing third in the three-way nonpartisan primary. In 2010, he had won a four-year term on the Lancaster County Board.

As the primary drew near, Smoyer led the field in fundraising; three weeks before the May 13 election, he had raised $19,000 and had $13,000 cash on hand. Hansen led the Democratic candidates, with $11,300 raised and $1,150 on hand. Weixelman reported $5,500 raised and $325 on hand; Valencia and Van Valkenburg had not filed a campaign-finance report with the Nebraska Accountability and Disclosure Commission, indicating that they had not raised or spent the $5,000 that would require such a report.

When the nonpartisan primary was held, Smoyer secured a narrow plurality, with 1968 of the 6086 votes, representing 32.3% of the total. Hansen came in second, with 1823 votes, or 30.0%. Weixelman placed third with 1105 votes (18.2%); Van Valkenburg took 597 votes (9.8%); and Valencia received 593 votes (9.7%).

==== 2014 general election ====
As the top two vote-getters in the primary, Smoyer and Hansen moved on to the general election. The candidates differed on a number of salient issues. Hansen supported the proposed expansion of Medicaid in Nebraska under the terms of the 2010 Affordable Care Act, declaring, "Ensuring that all Nebraskans have access to quality health care should remain a top priority of the Legislature"; Smoyer opposed it, expressing concern lest the federal government renege on its promise to reimburse states for the costs of the Medicaid expansion. Hansen favored the abolition of capital punishment in Nebraska; Smoyer favored keeping the death penalty, though using it rarely. Hansen was described as supporting a woman's right to an abortion; Smoyer, as "anti-abortion". Hansen wanted to repeal Nebraska's policy of denying driver's licenses to persons who were residing illegally in the United States after being brought to the country as children, and who were granted an exemption from deportation under the Barack Obama administration's Deferred Action for Childhood Arrivals (DACA) policy; Smoyer believed that such licenses should continue to be denied. Hansen believed that Nebraska's law requiring motorcyclists to wear helmets should be kept; Smoyer favored its repeal.

In the course of the entire legislative campaign, Hansen raised about $63,000 and spent about $59,000. His major contributors included the Nebraska State Education Association, with contributions totaling about $18,500, the local chapter of the International Association of Fire Fighters, with a contribution of $4000, and the Nebraska Association of Trial Attorneys, contributing $3500. Smoyer raised about $94,000 and spent about $95,000. His major contributors included the Nebraska Realtors, which gave him $8500 (also contributing $2000 to the Hansen campaign), the Nebraska Chamber of Commerce and Industry, which contributed about $5600, and the Nebraska Farm Bureau Federation, which contributed about $5600.

Hansen was endorsed by the Nebraska State Education Association and by the AFL–CIO; Smoyer and the Omaha Police Officers Association. Smoyer also won the editorial endorsement of the Lincoln Journal Star, which had endorsed him and Valencia in the primary election.

When the general election was held, Hansen defeated Smoyer, with 5376 votes to Smoyer's 4442, for a 55%–45% margin.
