= Rick Kolowski =

American politician (1944–2025)

Member of the Nebraska Legislature from the 31st district
- In office January 9, 2013 – January 6, 2021
- Preceded by: Rich Pahls
- Succeeded by: Rich Pahls

Personal details
- Born: December 26, 1944 Oglesby, Illinois, U.S.
- Died: September 4, 2025 (aged 80)
- Party: Democratic

Rick Kolowski (December 26, 1944 – September 4, 2025) was an American politician from the state of Nebraska. He represented District 31 in the Nebraska Legislature.

== Life and career ==
Kolowski was born on December 26, 1944. He earned his BA from Lake Forest College in 1966, his MS from the University of Nebraska Omaha, and his PhD from the University of Nebraska–Lincoln.

When Senator Rich Pahls retired and left the District 31 seat open, Kolowski placed first in the May 15, 2012, primary election with 3,214 votes, and won the November 6, 2012, general election with 9,121 votes against Acela Turco.

Kolowski retired from the Millard Public Schools where he served in several positions over his three decades of employment, culminating as principal of Millard West High School. Before running for the Nebraska Legislature, Kolowski served as a board member for the Learning Community of the Douglas and Sarpy Counties as well as an elected member of the Papio Missouri River Natural Resources District board.

Kolowski died on September 4, 2025, at the age of 80.
