= Joni Craighead =

American politician (born 1954)

Member of the Nebraska Legislature from the 6th district
- In office 2015–2017
- Preceded by: John Nelson
- Succeeded by: Theresa Thibodeau

Personal details
- Born: August 11, 1954 (age 71)
- Party: Republican
- Occupation: Realtor, real-estate developer

Joni Craighead (born August 11, 1954) is a politician from the state of Nebraska in the Midwestern United States. In 2014, she was elected to the Nebraska Legislature, representing a district in Omaha. She resigned in 2017, before the end of her term.

== Early life and professional career ==
Craighead was born Joni James, on August 11, 1954, in Nebraska City. She graduated from Nebraska City High School in 1976. In 1976, she received a B.S. in medical technology from the University of Nebraska Medical Center; in 1982, a Master of Public Administration degree from the University of Kansas.

In 1984, Craighead founded an image-consulting company; in 1996, she wrote a book, First Impressions: Tips to Enhance Your Image, with a number of tips to help women interested in "enhancing both your inner and outer beauty". She worked as a real estate broker and developer, and served as Governmental Affairs Director for the Omaha Area Board of Realtors.

She married Michael Craighead, and the couple had one child. In 2007, Michael died of cholangiocarcinoma; Craighead was one of the founders of the Cholangiocarcinoma Foundation, serving on the board of directors from 2006 to 2008. In 2012, she married fellow realtor Dick Hoback.

== Political career ==
Craighead was active in Republican Party politics in Omaha. She was a member of the Nebraska Republican Party Central Committee, an alternate delegate to the 2008 Republican National Convention, and at various times served as chair, vice-chair, and finance chair of the Douglas County Republican Party.

=== 2014 election ===
In September 2013, Craighead announced that she would run for the seat in the Nebraska Legislature representing the 6th District in west-central Omaha. The incumbent, Republican John Nelson, was barred by Nebraska's term-limits law from running for a third consecutive term in the 2014 election.

A total of six candidates joined the race: three Republicans, two Democrats, and an independent. The Republicans were Craighead; Paul Anderson, a retired railroad mechanic who had unsuccessfully run for the Legislature in 1994 and 1998; and Patricia Hannan, a former aide to state senator Tom Baker and an unsuccessful candidate for the Legislature in 2006. The Democrats were Omaha attorney John Stalnaker; and Justin Spooner, a 23-year-old who had served as a page in the Legislature and had interned with U.S. senators Ben Nelson and Mike Johanns. The independent candidate was George Westphal, a retired mechanical technician for Millard Public Schools, who had unsuccessfully run for the Legislature in 2010.

In the nonpartisan primary, Craighead won a narrow plurality, with 1581 votes, comprising 26.3% of the total. Stalnaker placed second, with 1438 votes, or 23.9%. Spooner received 1026 votes (17.1%); Hannan, 892 votes (14.8%); Anderson, 694 votes (11.5%); and Westphal, 380 votes (6.3%).

As the top two vote-getters, Craighead and Stalnaker moved on to the general election. The two candidates differed on the proposed expansion of Medicaid under the provisions of the 2010 Affordable Care Act: Stalnaker was in favor of it, while Craighead was opposed. The two also disagreed on a referendum to increase Nebraska's minimum wage: Stalnaker said that he would vote for it, while Craighead stated that she would vote against.

Over the course of the entire campaign, Craighead raised nearly $137,000 and spent $139,000. Major contributions included over $25,000 from the Nebraska Realtors PAC, $5000 from the Nebraska Bankers State PAC, $5000 from Republican gubernatorial candidate Pete Ricketts and his father Joe Ricketts, and $3500 from the Nebraska Chamber of Commerce and Industry PAC. Stalnaker raised about $125,000 and spent over $129,000. Major contributions to his campaign included $29,500 from the Nebraska State Education Association PAC, $5500 from the Nebraska Association of Trial Attorneys PAC, $3500 from the International Brotherhood of Electrical Workers, and $3000 from the United Transportation Union PAC; he also received $850 from the Nebraska Bankers State PAC.

When the general election was held in November 2014, Craighead received 5726 of the 11,127 votes cast, or 51.5% of the total. Stalnaker received 5401 votes, or 48.5%.

=== Legislative tenure ===
==== 2015 session ====
In the 2015 session of the Legislature, Craighead was appointed to the Banking, Commerce, and Insurance Committee, and the Government, Military, and Veterans Affairs Committee.

Among the "most significant" actions taken by the Legislature in its 2015 session were three bills that passed over vetoes by governor Pete Ricketts. LB268 repealed the state's death penalty; LB623 reversed the state's previous policy of denying driver's licenses to people who were living illegally in the United States after being brought to the country as children, and who had been granted exemption from deportation under the Barack Obama administration's Deferred Action for Childhood Arrivals (DACA) program; and LB610 increased the tax on gasoline to pay for repairs to roads and bridges. Craighead voted against the death-penalty repeal, and to sustain Ricketts's veto of the measure; she was listed as "excused and not voting" for the vote on LB623, and for the veto-override vote; and she voted against the gas-tax increase, and to sustain the gubernatorial veto.

==== 2016 session ====
In its 2016 session, the Nebraska Legislature passed three bills that Ricketts then vetoed. LB580 would have created an independent commission of citizens to draw new district maps following censuses; supporters described it as an attempt to de-politicize the redistricting process, while Ricketts maintained that the bill delegated the legislature's constitutional duty of redistricting to "an unelected and unaccountable board". Craighead voted against the bill in its 29–15 passage. Sponsor John Murante opted not to seek an override of the governor's veto.

A second vetoed bill, LB935, would have changed state audit procedures. The bill passed by a margin of 37–8, with 4 present and not voting; Craighead was among those voting against it. The bill was withdrawn without an attempt to override the veto; the state auditor agreed to work with the governor on a new version for the next year's session.

A third bill passed over Ricketts's veto. LB947 made DACA beneficiaries eligible for commercial and professional licenses in Nebraska. The bill passed the Legislature on a vote of 33–11–5; the veto override passed 31–13–5. Craighead was recorded as "present and not voting" when the bill initially passed; she voted against the override of Ricketts's veto.

The legislature failed to pass LB10, greatly desired by the Republican Party, which would have restored Nebraska to a winner-take-all scheme of allocating its electoral votes in U.S. presidential elections, rather than continuing its practice of awarding the electoral vote for each congressional district to the candidate who received the most votes in that district. Supporters were unable to break a filibuster; in the 32–17 cloture motion, Craighead was among those who voted for the bill.

==== 2017 resignation ====
Craighead resigned from her legislative seat, effective September 8, 2017, citing the need to focus on family and work obligations. She stated that she was resigning before the end of her first term in part so that Ricketts could fill the vacant seat with a Republican, who could then run as an incumbent in the 2018 election. In October 2017, Ricketts appointed Theresa Thibodeau to the vacant seat.

Political offices
Preceded by John Nelson	Nebraska State Senator - District 6; 2015 – 2017	Succeeded by Theresa Thibodeau
