= John E. Nelson (Nebraska politician) =

40th Lieutenant Governor of Nebraska

40th Lieutenant Governor of Nebraska
- In office September 29, 2014 – January 8, 2015
- Governor: Dave Heineman
- Preceded by: Lavon Heidemann
- Succeeded by: Mike Foley

Member of the Nebraska Legislature from the 6th district
- In office September 8, 2007 – September 29, 2014
- Preceded by: Pam Brown
- Succeeded by: Joni Craighead

Personal details
- Born: December 29, 1935 (age 90) Geneva, Nebraska, U.S
- Party: Republican
- Spouse: Judy Nelson
- Occupation: Attorney

John Edward Nelson (born December 29, 1935) is an American politician who served as the 40th lieutenant governor of Nebraska from September 29, 2014 to January 8, 2015 under Governor Dave Heineman. He is a member of the Republican Party.

Born in Geneva, Nebraska, Nelson received his bachelor's degree from University of Nebraska and his law degree from Creighton University. He practiced law in Omaha, Nebraska.

He was elected to the Nebraska Legislature in 2006, representing Nebraska's 6th legislative district; Nelson served until he resigned to assume the lieutenant governorship. While a member of the state legislature, he served on the Appropriations Committee and; in 2009, State Senator Nelson was elected vice-chairman of the executive board by a 33 to 15 margin.

Political offices
Preceded by Pam Brown	Nebraska State Senator from the 6th district 2007–2014	Succeeded by Joni Craighead
Preceded by Lavon Heidemann	Lieutenant Governor of Nebraska; 2014–2015	Succeeded by Mike Foley
