= Ray A. C. Johnson =

American politician (1923–2002)

20th Nebraska State Auditor
- In office January 7, 1971 – January 9, 1991
- Preceded by: Ray C. Johnson
- Succeeded by: John Breslow

Personal details
- Born: July 25, 1923 Stanton, Iowa
- Died: April 26, 2002 (aged 78) Lincoln, Nebraska
- Party: Republican
- Spouse: Mary Ann Butler (m. 1947)
- Children: 2 (Cynthia, Constance)
- Education: Creighton University
- Occupation: Certified public accountant

Ray A. C. Johnson (July 25, 1923 – April 26, 2002) was a Republican politician from Nebraska who served as the 20th Nebraska State Auditor from 1971 to 1991.

== Early career ==
Johnson was born in Stanton, Iowa, in 1923, and graduated from Stanton High School. He served in the U.S. Air Force during World War II, and later attended Creighton University, graduating in 1949. Johnson lived in Omaha, Nebraska, until 1961, when he moved to Lincoln and worked as a certified public accountant for the firm of Buckley and Lockett.

== Nebraska State Auditor ==
In 1970, incumbent State Auditor Ray C. Johnson declined to seek re-election, and Johnson, who was not related to him, ran in the Republican primary to succeed him. Johnson ran against Hans Johnson, an accountant, and Francis Walls, who was the chief examiner in the auditor's office and was endorsed by the incumbent. Johnson won the Republican primary by a wide margin, receiving 55 percent of the vote to Walls's 27 percent and Johnson's 18 percent, which some observers attributed to voter confusion.

In the general election, Johnson faced former State Treasurer Fred Sorensen, the Democratic nominee. Johnson ultimately defeated Sorensen by a narrow margin, winning his first term, 53–47 percent.

Johnson ran for re-election in 1974, and was challenged in the Republican primary by A. Calvin Rickard Jr., a tax consultant. He defeated Rickard in a landslide, receiving 79 percent of the vote to Rickard's 21 percent. In the general election, he was opposed by former State Treasurer Richard Larsen, the Democratic nominee. Johnson won a second term over Larsen, 55–45 percent.

In 1977, Johnson announced that he would run for the U.S. Senate in 1978. However, on February 16, 1978, he dropped out of the race, and instead ran for a third term as State Auditor. He won the Republican primary unopposed, and faced farmer Darl Naumann, a Democrat, in the general election. Johnson defeated Naumann in a landslide, winning 64 percent of the vote to his 36 percent.

Johnson ran for a fourth term in 1982, and was challenged in the Republican primary by Chuck Patteson, the former deputy auditor. Johnson fired Patteson from the auditor's office in 1981, which Patteson attributed to his refusal to sign off on an audit of Governor Charles Thone's office, which "did not mention some accounting practices considered questionable by Patteson and the others[.]" Johnson ultimately won renomination in a landslide, receiving 61 percent of the vote to Patteson's 39 percent. In the general election, Johnson faced a rematch against Darl Naumann, whom Patteson endorsed and praised as "young and energetic." Johnson defeated Naumann by a wide margin, but reduced from his 1978 victory, receiving 57 percent of the vote to Naumann's 43 percent.

In 1986, Johnson ran for re-election to a fifth term. He was unopposed in the Republican primary, and faced David Wilken, the Democratic nominee and a member of the Omaha School Board. Johnson defeated Wilken, winning 56–44 percent.

Johnson ran for a sixth term in 1990, and was challenged by businessman John Breslow, who won the Democratic nomination unopposed. Breslow, who was independently wealthy, loaned his campaign more than $320,000, and significantly outspent Johnson. Breslow attacked Johnson for "looking the other way" following allegations that Republican State Treasurer Frank Marsh had made several thousand dollars' worth of personal phone calls that were charged to the state. Johnson ultimately lost to Breslow in a landslide, receiving 35 percent of the vote to Breslow's 65 percent.

== Death ==
Johnson died on April 26, 2002.
