= David Hahn (American politician) =

American businessman

Personal details
- Born: 1955 (age 70–71) Omaha, Nebraska, U.S.
- Party: Democratic
- Education: Sterling College, Kansas (BA); University of Nebraska–Lincoln (JD)

David Hahn (born 1955) is an American businessman. He is the CEO of Internet development company New Digital Group and was the Democratic nominee for Governor of Nebraska in 2006.

== Biography ==
Hahn was born in Omaha, Nebraska, in 1955, and spent most of his youth in Schuyler and Stromsburg, Nebraska. When he was 15 years old, his family moved to Mount Vernon, Ohio, and he graduated from Mount Vernon High School in 1973. In 1978, he graduated from Sterling College in Kansas with a bachelor's degree in political science and philosophy. His undergraduate education included a year studying philosophy and theology at Phillips University in Marburg, Germany. After college, he returned to his home state and obtained a J.D. degree in 1981 from the University of Nebraska College of Law.

Hahn practiced law throughout the 1980s in Kearney, Nebraska, Lincoln, Nebraska, and Santa Fe, New Mexico. His hobby of software development eventually grew into New Digital Group, a company he founded in 1995, and of which he is the CEO.

Hahn announced his intention to run for Governor of Nebraska in December 2005. His only competition in the Democratic primary was Glenn Boot Jr. of Ashland, Nebraska who was disqualified due to a previous felony conviction. Hahn selected Wilcox, Nebraska farmer Steve Loschen as his running mate for Lieutenant Governor and faced Nebraska party candidate Barry Richards, independent Mort Sullivan, and incumbent Republican Governor Dave Heineman in the November 7, 2006 general election. He lost, only receiving 24% of the vote.

Party political offices
Preceded by Stormy Dean	Democratic nominee for Governor of Nebraska; 2006	Succeeded by Mike Meister
