= 2010 Nebraska gubernatorial election =

- November 2, 2010
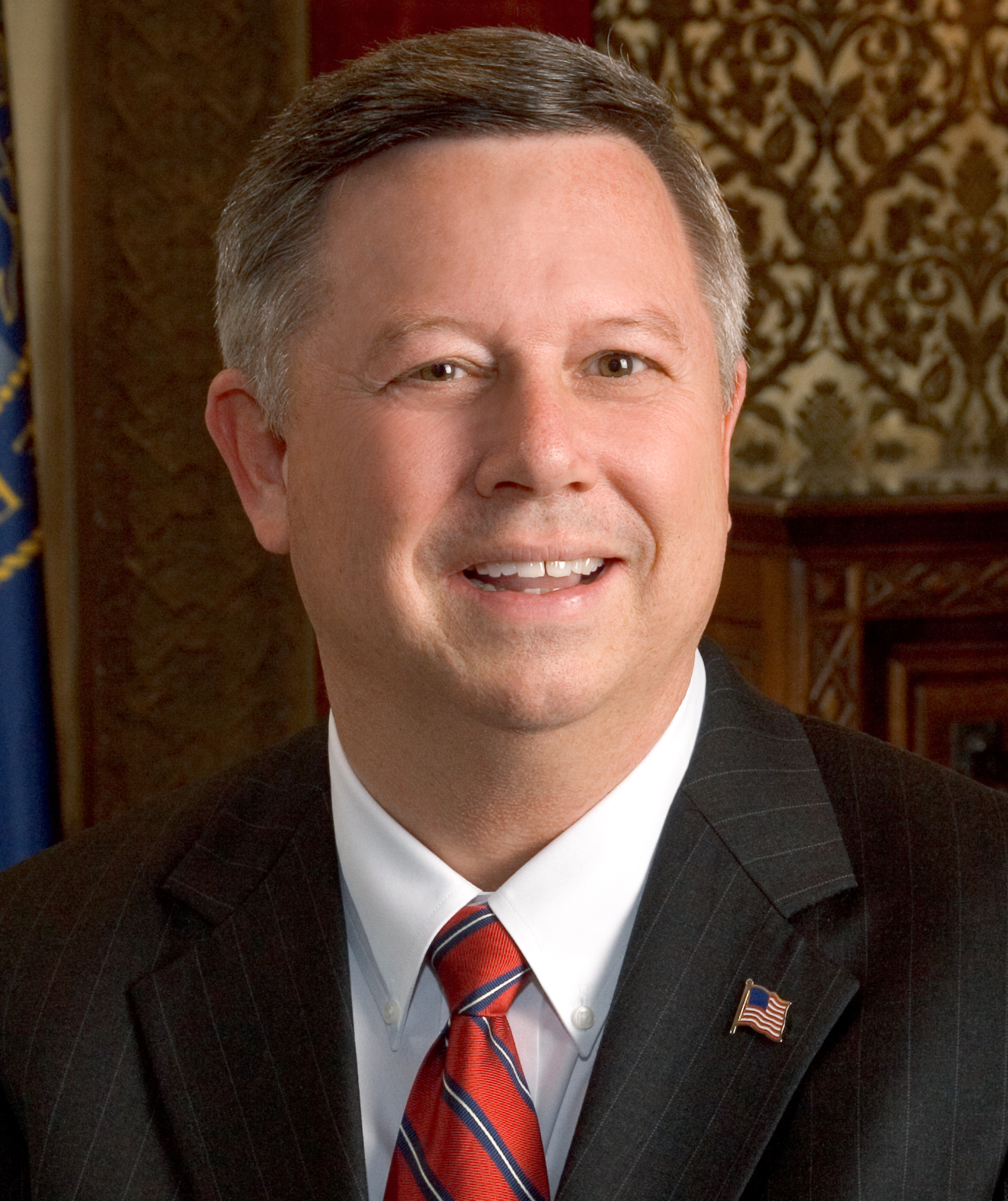

Nominee	Dave Heineman	Mike Meister
Party	Republican	Democratic
Running mate	Rick Sheehy	Anne Boyle
Popular vote	360,645	127,343
Percentage	73.90%	26.10%
- County results Heineman: 60–70% 70–80% 80–90% >90%
Governor before election
Dave Heineman
Republican
Elected Governor
Dave Heineman
Republican

The 2010 Nebraska gubernatorial election was held on Tuesday, November 2, 2010, to elect the governor of Nebraska, who would serve a four-year term that began in January 2011. Republican incumbent Dave Heineman won, defeating Democrat Mike Meister in a landslide. Heineman easily won his party's nomination. Mark Lakers ran unopposed in the Democratic primary, but dropped out in July 2010. Attorney Mike Meister was chosen as a replacement. As of 2022, this was the last time Lancaster County voted for the Republican candidate. To date, this is the last time that the winner of the Nebraska gubernatorial election carried every county.

== Republican primary ==
=== Candidates ===
- Paul Anderson
- Christopher Geary, retired Marine
- Dave Heineman, incumbent Governor of Nebraska

=== Results ===
Republican primary results
Party	Candidate	Votes	%
Republican	Dave Heineman (incumbent)	152,931	89.91
Republican	Paul Anderson	8,980	5.28
Republican	Christopher Geary	8,179	4.81
Total votes		170,090	100.00

== Democratic primary ==
=== Candidates ===
- Mark Lakers, investment banker

=== Results ===
Democratic primary results
Party	Candidate	Votes	%
Democratic	Mark Lakers	57,463	100.00
Total votes		57,463	100.00

Lakers was unopposed for the Democratic nomination. However, he dropped out of the race on July 2, 2010, due to a scandal involving campaign fundraising. Several donors listed on a campaign finance report denied ever giving money to Lakers, prompting criticism from both parties.

After being forced from the race due to investigations by the Nebraska Attorney General's Office and the Nebraska Campaign Disclosure Board, Lakers pleaded guilty in September to a misdemeanor charge of abuse of public records and admitted to falsifying his campaign finance reports. As part of the plea, Lakers acknowledged that 51 of the 80 pledges listed on his reports were false and agreed to pay a $500 fine.

Mike Meister, the Democratic nominee for Attorney General of Nebraska in 2002, was selected to replace him and he selected Nebraska Public Service Commissioner and former state Democratic Party chairwoman Anne Boyle as his running mate.

== General election ==
=== Predictions ===
Source	Ranking	As of
Cook Political Report	Safe R	October 14, 2010
Rothenberg	Safe R	October 28, 2010
RealClearPolitics	Safe R	November 1, 2010
Sabato's Crystal Ball	Safe R	October 28, 2010
CQ Politics	Safe R	October 28, 2010

=== Polling ===
Poll source	Date(s) administered	Sample size	Margin of error	Dave Heineman (R)	Mike Meister (D)	Other	Undecided
Rasmussen Reports	October 7, 2010	500	± 4.5%	66%	24%	3%	6%
Rasmussen Reports	September 2, 2010	500	± 4.5%	61%	28%	3%	8%
Rasmussen Reports	July 19, 2010	500	± 4.5%	71%	18%	2%	8%

Hypothetical polling

Poll source	Date(s) administered	Sample size	Margin of error	Dave Heineman (R)	Mark Lakers (D)	Other	Undecided
Rasmussen Reports	March 4, 2010	500	± 4.5%	61%	23%	2%	14%

=== Results ===
2010 Nebraska gubernatorial election
Party	Candidate	Votes	%	±%
Republican	Dave Heineman (inc.)	360,645	73.90%	+0.50%
Democratic	Mike Meister	127,343	26.10%	+1.64%
Majority		233,302	47.81%	−1.13%
Total votes		487,988	100.00	
Republican hold				

==== By County ====
By county

County	Person Democratic		Person Republican		Various candidates Other parties		Margin		Total votes
County	#	%	#	%	#	%	#	%	Total votes
Adams County									
Antelope County									
Arthur County									
Banner County									
Blaine County									
Boone County									
Box Butte County									
Boyd County									
Brown County									
Buffalo County									
Burt County									
Butler County									
Cass County									
Cedar County									
Chase County									
Cherry County									
Cheyenne County									
Clay County									
Colfax County									
Cuming County									
Custer County									
Dakota County									
Dawes County									
Dawson County									
Deuel County									
Dixon County									
Dodge County									
Douglas County									
Dundy County									
Fillmore County									
Franklin County									
Frontier County									
Furnas County									
Gage County									
Garden County									
Garfield County									
Gosper County									
Grant County									
Greeley County									
Hall County									
Hamilton County									
Hayes County									
Hitchcock County									
Holt County									
Hooker County									
Howard County									
Jefferson County									
Johnson County									
Kearney County									
Keith County									
Keya Paha County									
Kimball County									
Knox County									
Lancaster County									
Lincoln County									
Logan County									
Loup County									
Madison County									
McPherson County									
Merrick County									
Morrill County									
Nance County									
Nance County									
Nemaha County									
Nuckolls County									
Otoe County									
Pawnee County									
Perkins County									
Phelps County									
Pierce County									
Platte County									
Polk County									
Red Willow County									
Richardson County									
Rock County									
Saline County									
Sarpy County									
Saunders County									
Scotts Bluff County									
Seward County									
Sheridan County									
Sioux County									
Stanton County									
Thayer County									
Stanton County									
Thurston County									
Valley County									
Washington County									
Wayne County									
Webster County									
Wheeler County									
York County									
Totals									

== See also ==
- 2010 Nebraska elections
- 2010 United States gubernatorial elections
