= John Breslow =

American politician (born 1949)

- Official portrait, 2026

United States Ambassador to Cyprus
- Incumbent
- Assumed office September 9, 2026
- President: Donald Trump
- Preceded by: Julie D. Fisher

21st Nebraska State Auditor
- In office January 3, 1991 – January 7, 1999
- Preceded by: Ray A. C. Johnson
- Succeeded by: Kate Witek

Personal details
- Born: June 27, 1949 (age 77) Lincoln, Nebraska
- Party: Democratic (before 1994); Republican (1994–present)
- Spouse: Sonia Polonski (m. 1974)
- Children: 3 (Laura, Melissa, Danielle)
- Education: University of Nebraska–Lincoln (BS)
- Occupation: Businessman

John Breslow (born June 27, 1949) is a Republican politician and businessman who has been serving as the United States Ambassador to Cyprus since September 2026. From 1991 to 1999, he served as the Nebraska State Auditor. Originally elected as a Democrat, he switched to the Republican Party in 1994 and unsuccessfully ran for Governor in 1998. Prior to his political career, he owned LinWeld, a Nebraska-based supplier of welding goods and industrial gases.

== Early career ==
Breslow was born in Lincoln, Nebraska, and graduated from Lincoln Southeast High School, and the University of Nebraska–Lincoln, where he graduated with his bachelor's degree in education. Breslow owned LinWeld, a Nebraska-based supplier of welding goods and industrial gases, which he sold to Matheson in 2006.

== Nebraska State Auditor ==
In 1990, Breslow ran for State Auditor, challenging incumbent Republican Auditor Ray A. C. Johnson. He won the Democratic primary unopposed, and advanced to the general election against Johnson. Breslow self-funded his campaign with more than $320,000, and significantly outraised Johnson.

During the campaign, Dawn Rockey, the Democratic nominee for Treasurer, accused her opponent, Republican incumbent Frank Marsh, of having made several thousand dollars' worth of personal phone calls that were charged to the state, which Marsh ultimately admitted. Breslow attacked Johnson for being a "sleeping watchdog" and for "looking the other way" by not investigating Marsh's conduct.

Breslow defeated Johnson in a landslide, receiving 65 percent of the vote to Johnson's 35 percent, becoming the first Democrat to be elected Auditor since 1936.

Breslow was re-elected unopposed in 1994. Shortly following his uncontested re-election, he announced that he was leaving the Democratic Party, citing his belief "in smaller, more efficient government."

== 1998 gubernatorial election ==
In 1998, Democratic Governor Ben Nelson was term-limited and unable to seek re-election. Breslow ran to succeed him in the Republican primary, and ran against Lincoln Mayor Mike Johanns and Congressman Jon Christensen. Breslow was defeated by Johanns, winning 30 percent of the vote to Johanns's 40 percent, and Christensen's 28 percent.

== Subsequent career ==
Breslow ran for the University of Nebraska Board of Regents in 2000 from the 4th district, which included parts of southeastern Nebraska, challenging incumbent Regent Drew Miller for re-election. Breslow placed first in the nonpartisan primary by a wide margin, winning 45 percent of the vote to Miller's 24 percent. However, Miller narrowly defeated Breslow in the general election, receiving 51 percent of the vote to Breslow's 49 percent. Following the election, Breslow declined to concede, accusing Miller of working with a third-party campaign committee to attack Breslow over his support for the state's ban on fetal tissue research.

Breslow and his wife relocated to Arizona. He was a fundraiser for Donald Trump's 2024 presidential campaign, raising $250,000 for him. He was subsequently appointed to be United States Ambassador to Cyprus. He presented his credentials to the President of the Republic of Cyprus Nikos Christodoulides on September 9, 2026.
