= Ron Ross (Nebraska politician) =

American politician

39th Nebraska State Treasurer
- In office January 6, 2004 – January 4, 2007
- Preceded by: Lorelee Hunt Byrd
- Succeeded by: Shane Osborn

Personal details
- Born: July 21, 1954 (age 71) Deshler, Nebraska
- Party: Republican
- Spouse: Diane
- Children: 4 (Rob, Bill, Matt, Emily)
- Education: University of Colorado (B.S.)

Ron Ross (born July 21, 1954) is a Republican politician from Nebraska who served as State Treasurer from 2004 to 2007. He was appointed Treasurer in 2004 following the resignation of Lorelee Hunt Byrd, and ran for re-election in 2006, but was defeated in the Republican primary by Shane Osborn.

== Early career ==
Ross was born in Deshler, Nebraska, in 1954, and graduated from Wilber High School in 1973. He attended the University of Colorado, graduating with his bachelor's degree in business administration in 1978. He worked as a business manager and healthcare administrator in Denver, Rapid City, and Cambridge, Nebraska, before being appointed the Director of the Nebraska Department of Health and Human Services in 1999 by Governor Mike Johanns.

== State Treasurer ==
In 2004, following the resignation of State Treasurer Lorelee Hunt Byrd, Ross was appointed by Johanns as her replacement. Byrd had resigned after pleading guilty to official misconduct, and Ross pledged to return stability to the office. He ran for a full term in 2006, and was challenged in the Republican primary by Shane Osborn, a former U.S. Navy pilot. He was defeated by Osborn in a landslide, receiving 37 percent of the vote to Osborn's 63 percent.
