= Rick Sheehy =

38th Lieutenant Governor of Nebraska

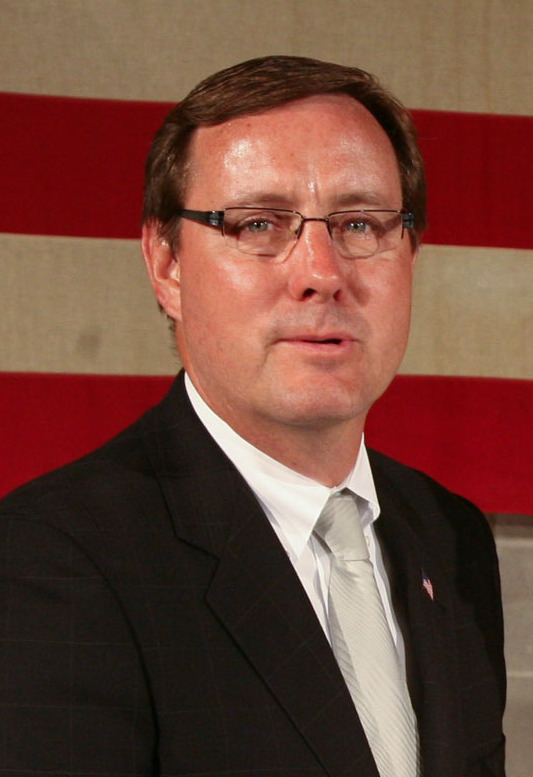
- Sheehy in 2009

38th Lieutenant Governor of Nebraska
- In office January 24, 2005 – February 2, 2013
- Governor: Dave Heineman
- Preceded by: Dave Heineman
- Succeeded by: Lavon Heidemann

52nd Chair of the National Lieutenant Governors Association
- In office 2011–2012
- Preceded by: Anthony Brown
- Succeeded by: Tim Murray

Personal details
- Born: October 3, 1959 (age 66) Hastings, Nebraska, U.S.
- Party: Democratic (before 2003); Republican (since 2003)
- Profession: Paramedic

Rick Sheehy (born October 3, 1959) is an American politician who served as the 38th lieutenant governor of Nebraska from 2005 to 2013. A member of the Republican Party since 2003, he is the longest-serving lieutenant governor in Nebraska history, with slightly over eight years of service. He was appointed to the office by Governor Dave Heineman, having been previously elected as Mayor of Hastings in 2000.

== Early life, education and private career ==
Sheehy was born in Hastings, Nebraska and graduated from St. Cecilia High School. He attended the University of Nebraska–Lincoln and later received certification as a paramedic from Central Community College in Hastings. Sheehy worked for Rural Metro Ambulance for more than 20 years, starting as an emergency medical technician and becoming Rural/Metro's paramedic field supervisor. In 1987, he became the market general manager, a position he held until his appointment as lieutenant governor.

In 1994, Sheehy was elected to the Hastings City Council as a Democrat. He served on the council for six years, for four of which (1996–2000), as president. He then served as Mayor of Hastings for four years. In 2003, he became a Republican.

== Lieutenant governorship ==
In 2005, Governor Mike Johanns resigned to serve as U.S. Secretary of Agriculture under President George W. Bush. Lieutenant Governor Dave Heineman ascended to the governorship, and then appointed Sheehy to succeed him as lieutenant governor. Soon afterward, Heineman named Sheehy as his running mate in his bid for a full term in 2006. The Heineman-Sheehy ticket was handily elected in 2006 and was reelected in 2010.

Sheehy is past Chairman of the National Lieutenant Governors Association; he completed his term in July, 2012. He continued his work with the Association by serving on the executive committee. He also served on the Homeland Security Advisors Council for the National Governors Association. As lieutenant governor, Sheehy was Director of Nebraska's Homeland Security Department. He is a past board member of the Nebraska Rural Health Association, as well as a FEMA Disaster Response Team member.

He was awarded the "Distinguished Service to the States" award by the Council of State Governments for his efforts as an advocate for Nebraska, and his work on computerized health records and emergency preparedness.

== Resignation ==
On February 2 and 3, 2013, the Omaha World-Herald reported that Sheehy, who was then married, had been using his state-issued cell phone to make 2,000 late-night telephone calls to four different women over a period of several years.

On February 2, Sheehy abruptly issued a two-sentence resignation letter. Later that day, then-Governor Dave Heineman held a press conference at the state capitol building to announce that he had accepted Sheehy's resignation. At the press conference, Heineman said, "We take our public trust very seriously. I had trusted him, and that trust was broken." Heineman's office subsequently released cell phone records corroborating the World-Herald's reporting. The records showed Sheehy had been making calls to women other than his wife for at least four years. He was replaced by Lavon Heidemann.

== Personal life ==
Sheehy married Connie Sheehy in 1983. The couple had two children before divorcing in 2012.

== See also ==
- List of American politicians who switched parties in office

Party political offices
| Preceded by Dave Heineman | Republican nominee for Lieutenant Governor of Nebraska; 2006, 2010 | Succeeded by Lavon Heidemann |
