= Theresa Thibodeau =

American politician from Nebraska

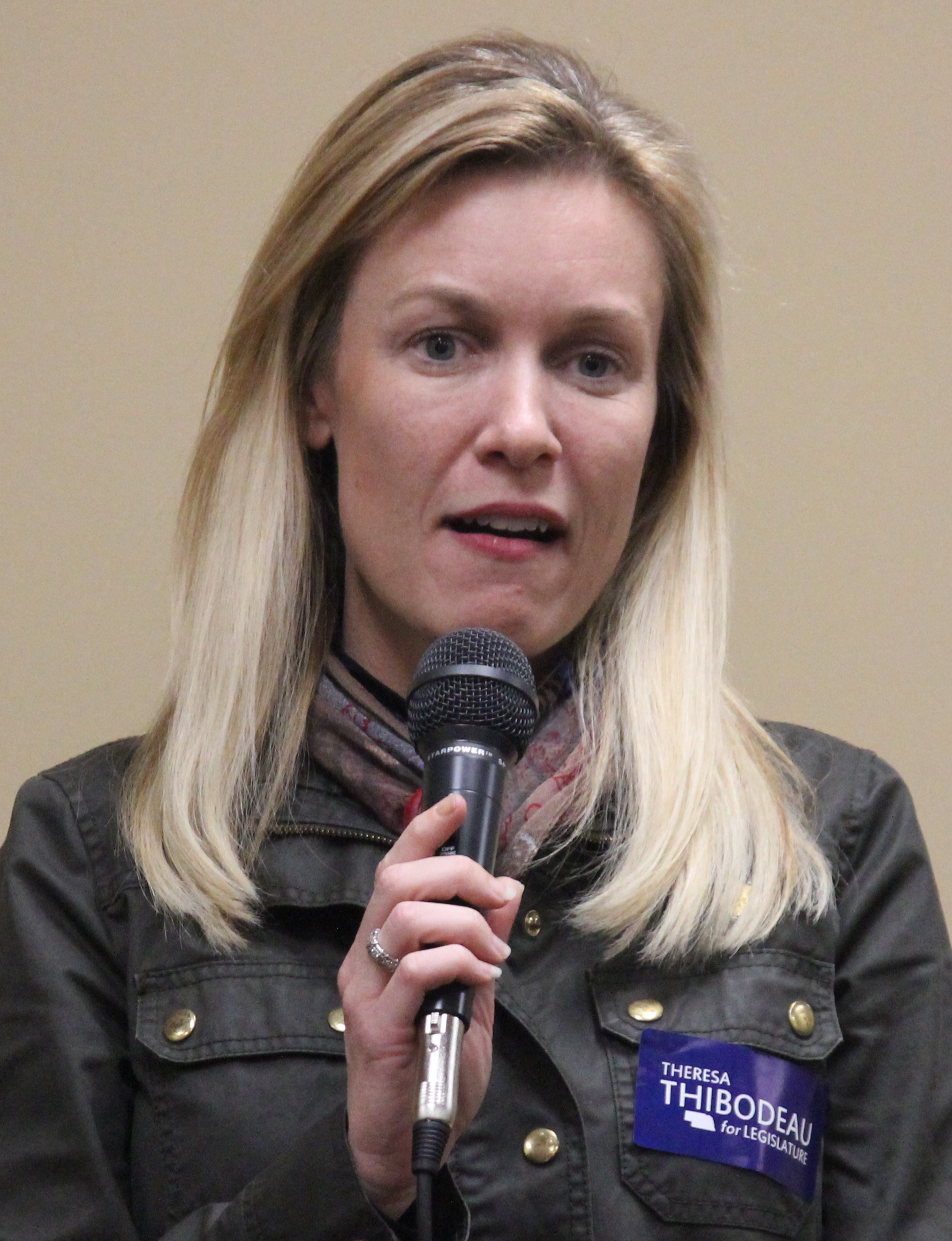
- Thibodeau in 2018

Member of the Nebraska Legislature from the 6th district
- In office October 19, 2017 – January 9, 2019
- Preceded by: Joni Craighead
- Succeeded by: Machaela Cavanaugh

Personal details
- Born: Theresa Sanderson; June 9, 1975 (age 51) Kansas City, Missouri, U.S.
- Party: Republican
- Spouse: Joseph Thibodeau (m. 2001)
- Children: 3
- Education: University of Nebraska, Omaha (BA)

Theresa Thibodeau (born June 9, 1975) is an American politician who served as a member of the Nebraska Legislature from 2017 to 2019. In November 2021, Thibodeau entered the Republican primary for Governor of Nebraska.

== Early life and career ==
Thibodeau was born Theresa Sanderson on June 9, 1975, in Kansas City, Missouri. She attended Capistrano Valley High School and graduated in 1993. She attended the University of Nebraska at Omaha from 1996 to 1998, and graduated with a bachelor's degree in psychology.

== Political career ==
=== Nebraska State Legislature ===
Thibodeau was appointed to represent District 6, in Omaha, by Governor Pete Ricketts in October 2017. The seat became vacant following the resignation of the incumbent Republican, Joni Craighead. Thibodeau was encouraged by Pete Rickets to submit her name for the position, which she did on October 13, two weeks after the deadline to submit on September 29. Thibodeau was defeated by Democrat Machaela Cavanaugh in the 2018 midterm elections held in November 2018.

Thibodeau unsuccessfully sought the Republican nomination for governor in the 2022 Nebraska gubernatorial election. She came in fourth place with 6.05% of the vote, behind Jim Pillen (33.75%), Charles Herbster (30.13%), and Brett Lindstrom (25.68%).

== Electoral history ==
Nebraska's 6th Legislative District Election, 2018
Primary election
| Party | Candidate | Votes | % |
|---|---|---|---|
| Republican | Theresa Thibodeau (incumbent) | 3,641 | 51.30 |
| Democratic | Machaela Cavanaugh | 3,027 | 42.65 |
| Independent | Ricky Fulton | 429 | 6.04 |
| Total votes | | 7,097 | 100.0 |
General election
| Democratic | Machaela Cavanaugh | 7,733 | 50.95 |
| Republican | Theresa Thibodeau (incumbent) | 7,445 | 49.05 |
| Total votes | | 15,178 | 100.0 |
| Democratic gain from Republican | | | |

== Personal life ==
Thibodeau is a Catholic. She and her husband, Joseph Thibodeau, live in Nebraska with their three children, two daughters and a son.

Nebraska Legislature
| Preceded by Joni Craighead | Member of the Nebraska Legislature from the 6th district 2017–2019 | Succeeded by Machaela Cavanaugh |
