= Kate Witek =

American politician (born 1954)

Nebraska Auditor of Public Accounts
- In office January 1999 – January 2007
- Governor: Mike Johanns; Dave Heineman
- Preceded by: John Breslow
- Succeeded by: Mike Foley

Member of the Nebraska Legislature from the 31st district
- In office January 1993 – January 1999
- Preceded by: Jerry Chizek
- Succeeded by: Mark Quandahl

Personal details
- Born: October 22, 1954 (age 71) Detroit, Michigan, U.S.
- Party: Republican (until 2006); Democratic (after 2006)

Kate Witek (born October 22, 1954) is a former Nebraska Auditor of Public Accounts, member of the Nebraska Legislature, and candidate for Lieutenant Governor of Nebraska. She was first elected Nebraska State Auditor in November 1998 as a Republican. She was reelected in 2002 as a Republican but was defeated in her attempt for a third term in 2006 after switching to the Democratic Party.

== Political career and party switch ==
Witek began her career as a Republican, winning election to the nonpartisan unicameral Nebraska Legislature in November 1992 from District 31 in southwestern Omaha. She was the elected Republican nominee for Lieutenant Governor in 1994 and ran as a team with Gene Spence, the unsuccessful Republican candidate for Governor. After the 1994 election the legislature changed the Nebraska Constitution so that the position of Lieutenant Governor became an appointed position instead of an elected position. Witek was reelected to the Legislature in 1996 but resigned from her District 31 seat upon her swearing-in as the first woman Nebraska Auditor of Public Accounts in January 1999. She was reelected State Auditor in 2002.

After running as the Lieutenant Governor candidate with unsuccessful Governor candidate Tom Osborne, Republican Witek decided to switch parties in August 2006, citing concerns about a Republican Party that, in her own words, "...was only looking at controlling all the offices instead of looking at resolving the problems challenging this state."

Witek had initially decided to forgo reelection in 2006, but after she switched parties, the Nebraska Democratic Party nominated her as their candidate for Auditor at their State Convention in Grand Island, Nebraska.

== Personal life ==
Kate Witek is married to Charles Witek.

== See also ==
- List of American politicians who switched parties in office

Party political offices
Preceded by Jack Maddux	Republican nominee for Lieutenant Governor of Nebraska; 1994	Succeeded by David Maurstad
Preceded by John Breslow	Republican nominee for Nebraska State Auditor; 1998, 2002	Succeeded by Mike Foley
Preceded by David A. Wilken	Democratic nominee for Nebraska State Auditor; 2006	Vacant Title next held by Amanda McGill
Preceded by Jerry Chizek	Nebraska state senator–District 31; 1993–1998	Succeeded by Mark Quandahl
Preceded by John Breslow	Nebraska Auditor of Public Accounts; 1999–2007	Succeeded by Mike Foley
