= Hainan Island incident =

2001 aviation accident between aircraft of the US and China

- The damaged EP-3 on the ground on Hainan Island.
| Date | April 1–11, 2001 |
| Location | Hainan Island, People's Republic of China, South China Sea 17.6056°N 111.3611°E |
| Result | American crew detained, later released; one Chinese J-8 pilot MIA and presumed dead |

Belligerents
| United States | China |

Commanders and leaders
| George W. Bush: Lt. Shane Osborn | Jiang Zemin: Lt. Cdr. Wang Wei † |

Strength
| 1 EP-3E signals intelligence aircraft | 2 Shenyang J-8II aircraft |

Casualties and losses
| 1 EP-3E damaged and captured; 24 aircrew captured and detained | 1 J-8 destroyed; 1 pilot missing, presumed dead |

A ten-day international incident between the United States and the People's Republic of China (PRC) resulted from a mid-air collision between a United States Navy EP-3E ARIES II signals intelligence aircraft and a People's Liberation Army Air Force J-8 interceptor on April 1, 2001.

The EP-3 was flying over the South China Sea at a point roughly midway between Hainan Island and the Paracel Islands when it was intercepted by two J-8II fighters. A collision between the EP-3 and one of the J-8s caused damage to the EP-3 and the loss of the J-8 and its pilot. The EP-3 was forced to make an emergency landing on Hainan without permission from the PRC, and its 24 crew members were detained and interrogated by Chinese authorities until a statement was delivered by the United States government regarding the incident. The ambiguous phrasing of the statement allowed both countries to save face and defused a potentially volatile situation.

== Background ==
This sea area includes the South China Sea Islands, which are claimed by the PRC and several other countries. It is a strategically sensitive area.

The United States and the People's Republic of China disagree on the legality of the overflights by US naval aircraft of the area where the incident occurred. This part of the South China Sea comprises part of the PRC's exclusive economic zone based on the United Nations Convention on the Law of the Sea (UNCLOS) and the Chinese claim that the Paracel Islands belong to China. This claim was acknowledged by Vietnam in 1958 but it has since reversed itself to contest the claim after the end of the Vietnam War in 1975. The United States remains neutral in this dispute, but patrols the sea regularly with naval ships and airplanes, during what it terms freedom of navigation operations. The PRC interprets the convention as allowing it to preclude other nations' military operations within this area, but the United States does not recognize China's claim for the Paracel Islands and maintains that the Convention grants free navigation for all countries' aircraft and ships, including military aircraft and ships, within a country's exclusive economic zone. Although the United States is not party to UNCLOS, it has accepted and complies with nearly all of the treaty's provisions.

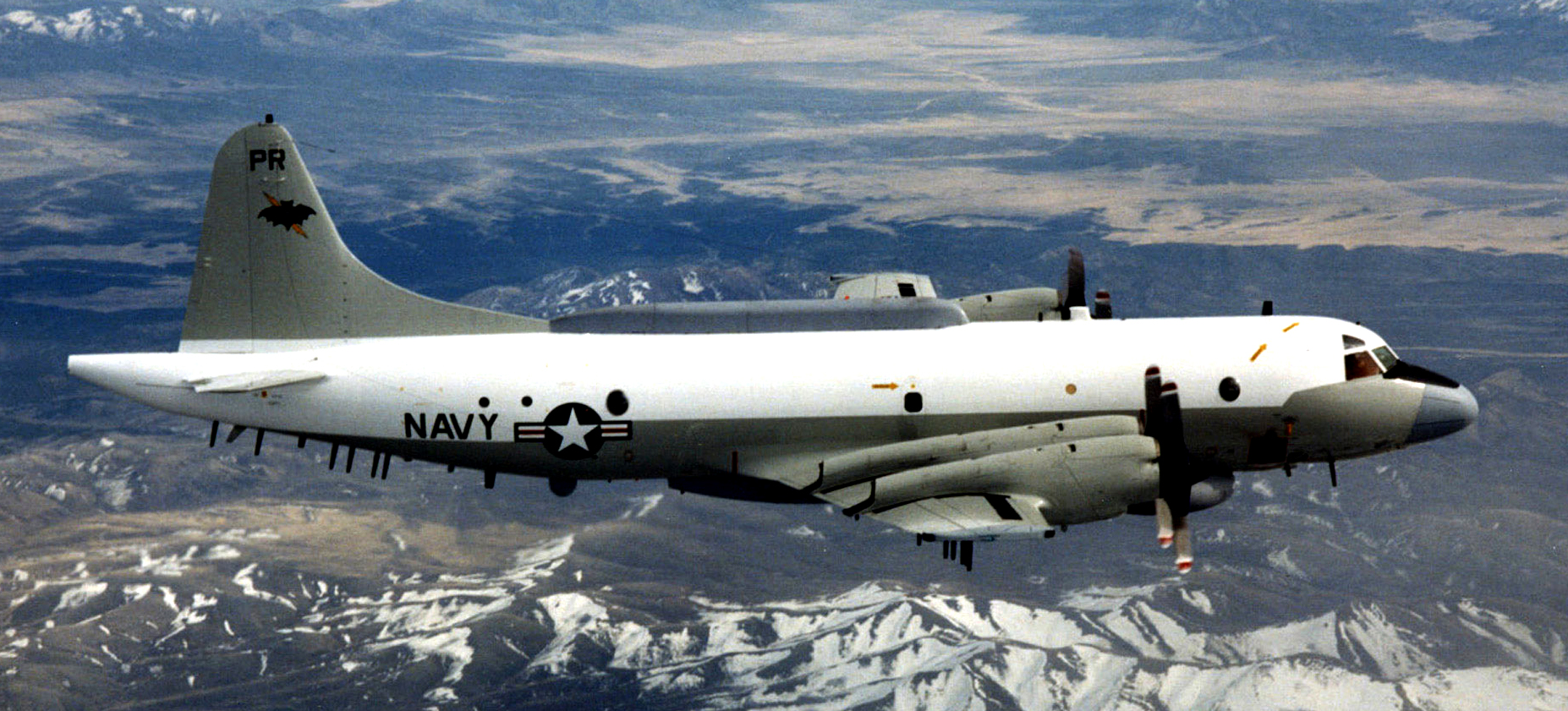
An EP-3E of VQ-1

A PRC Sukhoi Su-27 force is based at Hainan. The island also houses a large signals intelligence facility that tracks civil and military activity in the area and monitors traffic from commercial communications satellites. The United States has long kept the island under surveillance; on May 22, 1951, for example, RAF Spitfire PR Mk 19s based at Hong Kong's Kai Tak Airport flew photo-reconnaissance missions at the behest of US naval intelligence.

== In the air ==
On April 1, 2001, the EP-3 (BuNo 156511), assigned to Fleet Air Reconnaissance Squadron One (VQ-1, "World Watchers"), had taken off as Mission PR32 from Kadena Air Base in Okinawa, Japan. At about 9:15 a.m. local time, toward the end of the EP-3's six-hour ELINT mission, it was flying at 22,000 feet (6,700 m) and 180 knots (210 mph; 330 km/h), on a heading of 110°, about 70 miles (110 km) away from the island. Two Chinese J-8s from Hainan's Lingshui airfield approached. One of the J-8s (81194), piloted by Lt. Cdr. Wang Wei, made two close passes to the EP-3. On the third pass, it collided with the larger aircraft. The J-8 broke into two pieces; the EP-3's radome detached completely and its No. 1 (outer left) propeller was damaged severely. Airspeed and altitude data were lost, the aircraft depressurized, and an antenna became wrapped around the tailplane. The J-8's tail fin struck the EP-3's left aileron, forcing it fully upright, and causing the Lockheed to roll to the left at three to four times its normal maximum rate.

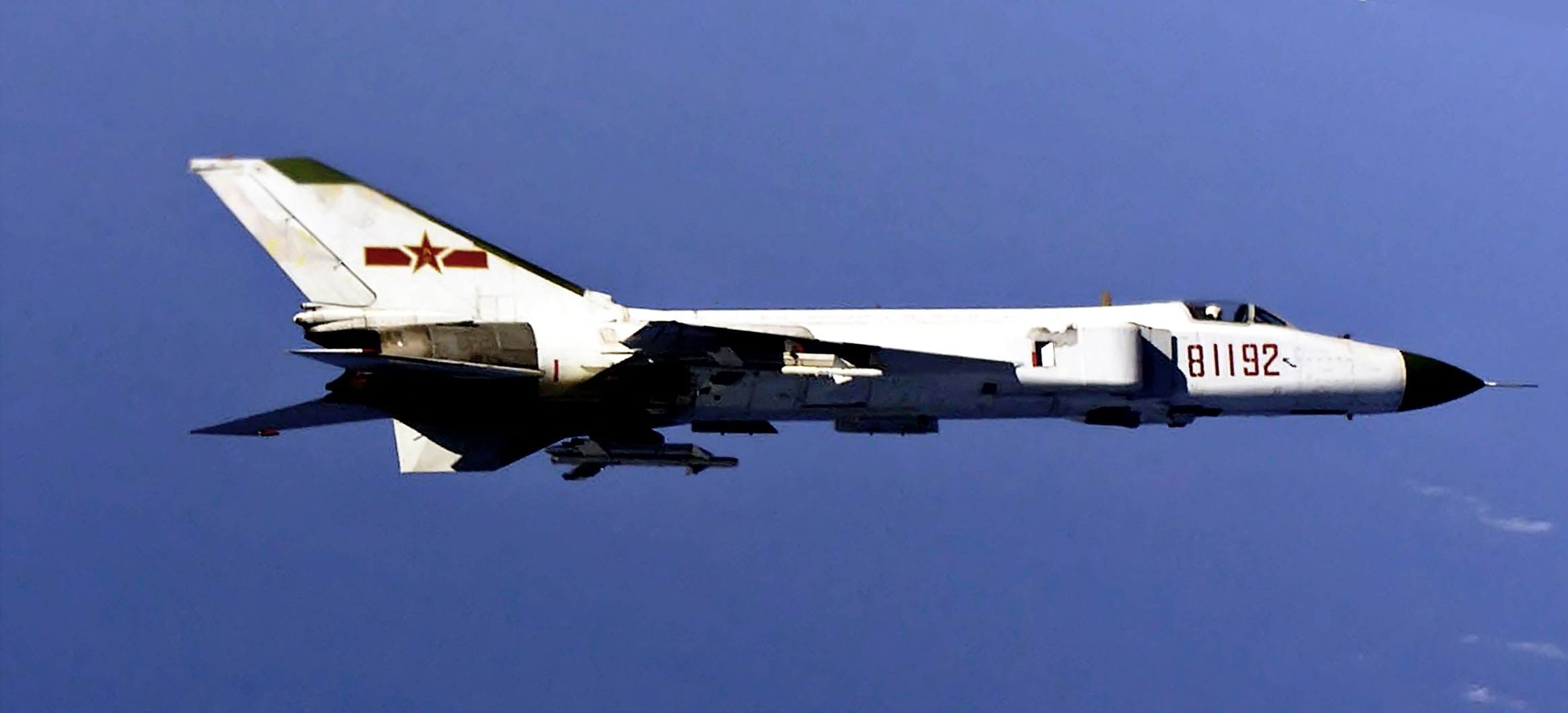
Shenyang J-8 81192, a different aircraft piloted by Lt Cdr Wang Wei in an earlier altercation with an American EP-3E.

The impact sent the EP-3 into a 30° dive at a bank angle of 130°, almost inverted. It dropped 8,000 feet (2,400 m) in 30 seconds, and fell another 6,000 feet (1,800 m) before the pilot, Lt. Shane Osborn, got the EP-3's wings level and the nose up. In a September 2003 article in Naval Aviation News, Osborn said that once he regained control of the aircraft, he "called for the crew to prepare to bail out". He then managed to control the aircraft's descent by using emergency power on the working engines, allowing him to plan an emergency landing on Hainan.

Shenyang J-8 (81192) in another altercation with a US reconnaissance aircraft in January 2001.

For the next 26 minutes, the crew of the EP-3 performed an emergency plan which included destroying sensitive items aboard the aircraft, such as electronic equipment related to intelligence-gathering, documents and data. Part of this plan involved pouring freshly brewed coffee into disk drives and motherboards and using an axe from the plane's survival kit to destroy hard drives. The crew had not been formally trained on how to destroy sensitive documents and equipment, and so improvised. As a result of the destruction, the plane's interior was later described as resembling "the aftermath of a frat party".

Osborn made an unauthorized emergency landing at Lingshui airfield, after at least 15 distress signals had gone unanswered, with the emergency code selected on the transponder. It landed at 170 knots (200 mph; 310 km/h), with no flaps, no trim, and a damaged left elevator, weighing 108,000 pounds (49,000 kg). After the collision, the failure of the nose cone had disabled the No. 3 (inner right) engine, and the No. 1 propeller could not be feathered, resulting in increased drag on that side. There was no working airspeed indicator or altimeter, and Osborn used full right aileron during the landing. The other J-8 involved in the intercept had landed there 10 minutes earlier.

Wang was seen to eject after the collision, but the Pentagon said that the damage to the underside of the EP-3 could mean that the cockpit of the Chinese fighter jet was crushed, making it impossible for the pilot to survive. Wang's body was never recovered, and he was presumed dead.

=== Cause of collision ===
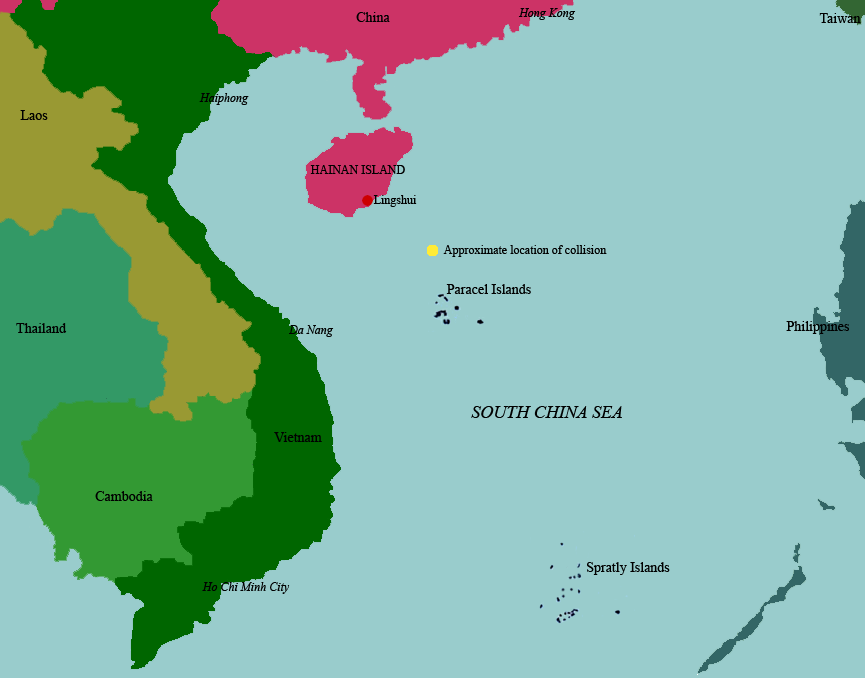
Area of the collision in the South China Sea.

Both the cause of the collision and the assignment of blame were disputed:

- The US government stated that the Chinese jet bumped the wing of the larger, slower, and less maneuverable EP-3. After returning to US soil, the pilot of the EP-3, Lt. Shane Osborn, was allowed to make a brief statement in which he said that the EP-3 was on autopilot and in straight-and-level flight at the time of the collision. He stated that he was just "guarding the autopilot" in his interview with Frontline. The U.S. released video footage from previous missions which revealed that American reconnaissance crews had previously been intercepted by the same aircraft.
- The Chinese government stated that, according to Wang Wei's wingman, the American aircraft "veered at a wide angle towards the Chinese", in the process ramming the J-8.

Neither claim can be verified since the Chinese government took possession of both aircraft's flight recorders, and has not publicly released data from either one.

== On the ground ==
For 15 minutes after landing, the EP-3 crew continued to destroy sensitive items and data on board the aircraft, as per protocol. They disembarked from the aircraft after soldiers looked through windows, pointed guns and shouted through bullhorns. The Chinese offered them water and cigarettes. Guarded closely, they were taken to a military barracks at Lingshui where they were interrogated for two nights before being moved to lodgings in Haikou, the provincial capital and largest city on the island. They were generally treated well. However, they were interrogated at all hours and thus suffered from lack of sleep. They found the Chinese food unpalatable as it included fish heads, but this later improved. Guards gave them decks of cards and an English-language newspaper. To pass the time and keep spirits up, Lts. Honeck and Vignery worked up humorous routines based on the television shows The People's Court, Saturday Night Live, and The Crocodile Hunter. These were performed as they went to meals, the only time they were together. They gradually developed good relations with their guards, with one guard inquiring of them the lyrics for the song "Hotel California" by the Eagles.

Three US diplomats were sent to Hainan to meet the crew, assess their conditions and to negotiate the crew's release. The diplomats were first allowed to meet with the crew three days after the incident. US officials complained about China's delays in this regard.

The 24 crew members (21 men and three women) were detained for 10 days in total and were released soon after the US issued the "letter of the two sorries" to the Chinese. The crew was only partially successful in their destruction of classified material. Some of the material they failed to destroy included cryptographic keys, signals intelligence manuals, and the names of National Security Agency employees. Some of the captured computers contained detailed information for processing PROFORMA communications from North Korea, Russia, Vietnam, China, and other countries. The plane also carried information on the emitter parameters for US-allied radar systems worldwide. China also discovered that the United States could track People's Liberation Army Navy submarines via signal transmission.

== Letter of the two sorries ==
The "Letter of the two sorries" was the letter delivered by the United States Ambassador Joseph Prueher to Foreign Minister Tang Jiaxuan of the People's Republic of China to end the incident. Upon delivery of the letter, China released the detained crew and eventually returned the disassembled aircraft. The letter stated that the United States was "very sorry" for the death of Chinese pilot Wang Wei (王伟) and was "very sorry" the aircraft entered China's airspace, additionally apologizing because its landing did not have "verbal clearance". The United States stated that it was "not a letter of apology"–as then characterized by state-owned Chinese media outlets–but that instead it was "an expression of regret and sorrow". China had originally asked for an apology, but the U.S. explained, "We did not do anything wrong, and therefore it was not possible to apologize".

There was further debate over the exact meaning of the Chinese translation issued by the US Embassy. A senior administration official was quoted as saying "What the Chinese will choose to characterize as an apology, we would probably choose to characterize as an expression of regret or sorrow". General Secretary of the Chinese Communist Party Jiang Zemin accepted the expression of "very sorry" as consistent with the formal apology that China had sought, and so China released the Americans thereafter.

== Aftermath ==
The crew of the EP-3 was released on April 11, 2001, and returned to their base at Whidbey Island via Honolulu, Hawaii, where they were subject to two days of debriefings. The pilot, Lt. Shane Osborn, was awarded the Distinguished Flying Cross for "heroism and extraordinary achievement" in flight. The J-8B pilot, Wang Wei, was posthumously honored in China as a "Guardian of Territorial Airspace and Waters". His widow received a personal letter of condolence from US President George W. Bush.

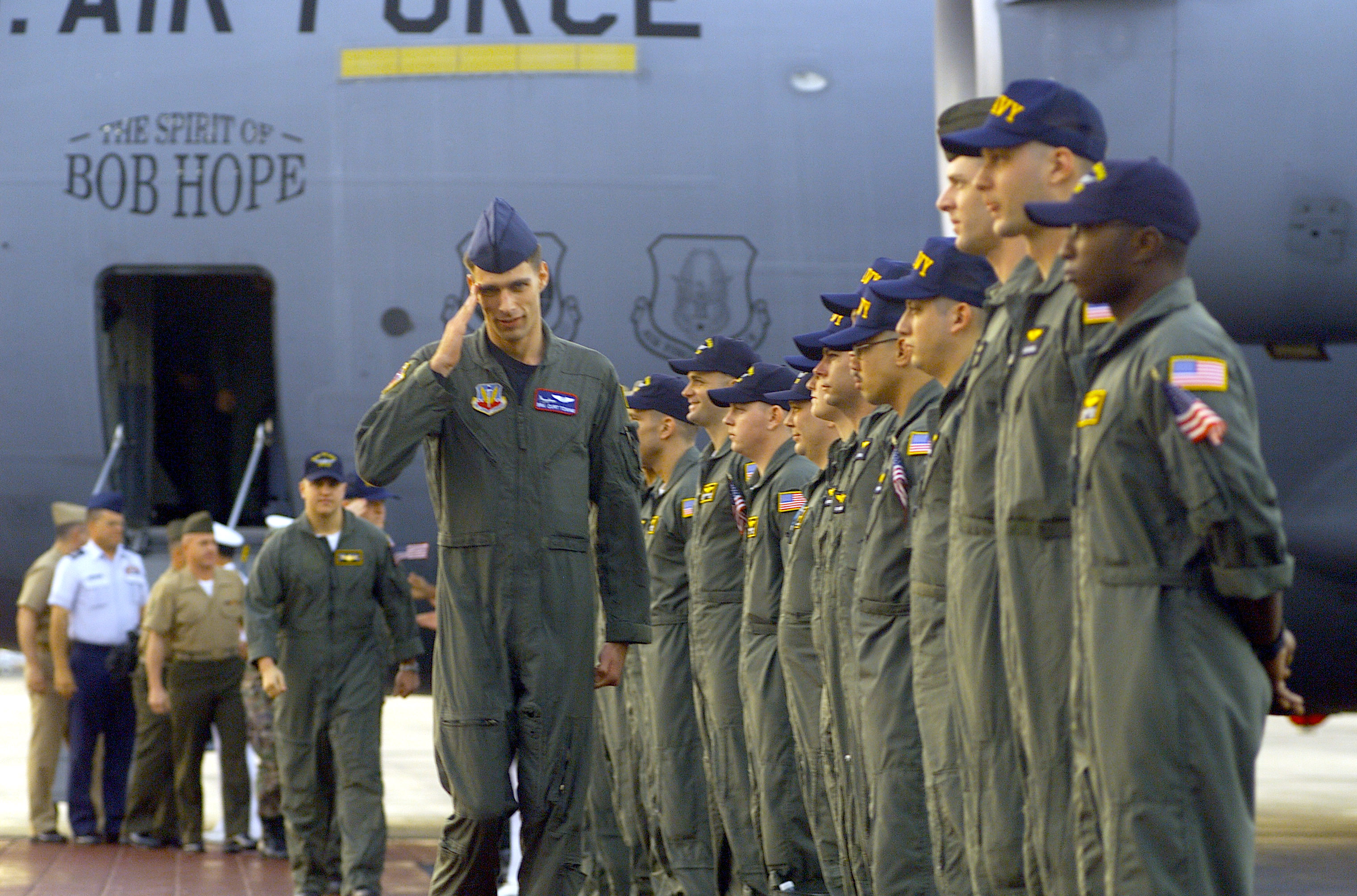
The EP-3 crew arrives at Hickam AFB in Hawaii. Pictured saluting is U.S. Air Force Senior Airman Curtis Towne.

US Navy engineers said the EP-3 could be repaired in 8–12 months, but China refused to allow it to be flown off Hainan island. The disassembled aircraft was released on July 3, 2001, and was returned to the United States by the Russian airline Polet Flight in two Antonov An-124 Ruslans. Repairs were performed at Lockheed Martin in Marietta, Georgia, for reassembly and to make it flightworthy again. The aircraft was then flown to L3 in Waco, Texas for missionization as they were the main provider of EP-3 maintenance and modernization at the time. After being returned to service, 156511 was transferred to VQ-1 in 2012, and on October 21, 2024, it was retired to Davis-Monthan Air Force Base and three days later moved to Pima Air and Space Museum for display.

The incident occurred ten weeks after George W. Bush's presidential inauguration and was his first foreign policy crisis. Both countries were criticized after the event: the Chinese for making a bluff which was called without any real concessions from America other than the "Letter of the two sorries"; and the US first for being insensitive immediately after the event and later for issuing the letter rather than being more oppositional. The United States tried to be conciliatory in order to try to avoid Chinese objections to US foreign policy, which became more important after the September 11 attacks and at the beginning of the war on terror.

Among the Chinese public, the incident created negative feelings towards the United States and increased feelings of Chinese nationalism. Despite the fact that the destroyed aircraft carried the serial number 81194, footage of Lt Cdr Wang Wei piloting airplane J-8B bearing serial number 81192 in a similar incident earlier in the year was popularized and became a national icon for both the PLANAF and the Chinese nation.

After the collision, China briefly lessened aggressiveness in monitoring of reconnaissance flights. Flights of US surveillance aircraft near the Chinese coastline continued as before the incident.

As of 2009, Hainan was the home of the People's Liberation Army Navy (PLAN) Hainan Submarine Base, an underground facility capable of supporting nuclear ballistic missile submarines. During March 2009, Chinese ships and aircraft approached the USNS Impeccable, an ocean surveillance ship of the US Navy while operating 75 miles (121 km) south of Hainan. Pentagon officials characterized the actions as "aggressive" and "harassment". In August 2014, the US protested when a Chinese Shenyang J-11BH came within 30 feet (10 m) of a patrolling Boeing P-8 Poseidon aircraft and performed aerobatic maneuvers including a barrel roll. In May 2016, the US protested when two Shenyang J-11BH aircraft reportedly came within 50 feet (15 m) of a US EP-3 on "a routine" patrol approximately 50 miles (80 km) east of Hainan Island. China responded by demanding an end to US surveillance near China.

== In popular culture ==
The Other Washington, a speculative espionage novel and its graphic adoption, both by Liu Wei, incorporate the 2001 Hainan Island incident into its fictional narrative.

== See also ==
- List of accidents and incidents involving military aircraft (2000–09)
