= Lorelee Hunt Byrd =

American politician (born 1956)

38th Nebraska State Treasurer
- In office October 1, 2001 – January 6, 2004
- Governor: Mike Johanns
- Preceded by: Dave Heineman
- Succeeded by: Ron Ross

Personal details
- Born: April 14, 1956 (age 69) Bassett, Nebraska
- Party: Republican
- Children: 2 (Amy, Ryan)

Lorelee Hunt Byrd (born April 14, 1956) is a Republican politician who served as Nebraska State Treasurer from 2001 to 2004. She was appointed by Governor Mike Johanns as Treasurer in 2001 to replace former Treasurer Dave Heineman, who became Lieutenant Governor, and was re-elected in 2002. She resigned in 2004 after pleading guilty to official misconduct.

== Early career ==
Byrd was born in Bassett, Nebraska, in 1956, and graduated from Stanton High School in Stanton. She attended Wayne State College, but did not graduate. Byrd worked in the insurance industry for Mutual of Omaha, and then as an aide to state senators Sharon Beck and Owen Elmer, and then to Congressman Doug Bereuter. In 1995, after the election of Dave Heineman as State Treasurer, Byrd was appointed as the administrator of unclaimed property, and was appointed Deputy State Treasurer later that year.

== State Treasurer ==
In 2001, Treasurer Dave Heineman was appointed Lieutenant Governor following the resignation of David Maurstad. Following Heineman's resignation as Treasurer, Governor Mike Johanns appointed Byrd as his successor. Byrd ran for a full term in 2002. She faced businessman Brad Kuiper and Sarpy County Deputy Treasurer Rene Dreiling in the Republican primary, both of whom announced their candidacies prior to Byrd's appointment, given that Heineman was term-limited in 2002. Byrd defeated both by a wide margin, winning 58 percent of the vote to Kuiper's 26 percent and Dreiling's 16 percent. In the general election, she faced no major-party opposition, and was chalelnged by Bob Scheckler, the Nebraska Party nominee. Byrd defeated Scheckler with 76 percent of the vote.

Byrd faced allegations that she was protecting her office from budget cuts by writing $300,000 in checks and then cancelling them, making it appear as though unspent money had actually been spent. The Nebraska State Patrol initiated a criminal investigation of Byrd's office, and following the investigation, she entered into a plea agreement with state Attorney General Jon Bruning, in which she pleaded guilty to a misdemeanor count of official misconduct. In response, Governor Johanns and a majority of the Nebraska Legislature called on Byrd to resign. As the legislature considered pursuing impeachment, Byrd announced on December 2, 2003, that she would resign from office. She left office on January 6, 2004, and was succeeded by Ron Ross. Following her resignation, Bruning released the State Patrol's report, which concluded that Byrd had hidden $300,000 and lied to the State Patrol during its investigation.
