= Lavon Heidemann =

39th Lieutenant Governor of Nebraska

39th Lieutenant Governor of Nebraska
- In office February 13, 2013 – September 9, 2014
- Governor: Dave Heineman
- Preceded by: Rick Sheehy
- Succeeded by: John E. Nelson

Member of the Nebraska Legislature from the 1st district
- In office 2005–2013
- Preceded by: Floyd Vrtiska
- Succeeded by: Dan Watermeier

Personal details
- Born: October 24, 1958 (age 67) Pawnee City, Nebraska, U.S.
- Party: Republican
- Spouse: Robin
- Occupation: Dairy farmer, politician

Lavon Lynn Heidemann (born October 24, 1958) is an American politician and farmer who served as the 39th lieutenant governor of Nebraska from February 13, 2013 to September 9, 2014 under Governor Dave Heineman. He is a member of the Republican Party.

== Biography ==
Born in Pawnee City, Nebraska, Heidemann graduated from Elk Creek High School in 1977. He was a dairy farmer and member of the Elk Creek Public Schools Board of Education. He is also a member of the local fire district board and attends St. Peter's Lutheran Church.

In 2004, Heidemann ran for a seat representing the 1st district in the Nebraska Legislature and won. In 2008, he ran unopposed, until his support for an increase in the gas tax prompted Jerry Joy to launch an ultimately unsuccessful write-in campaign. He served as chairman of the Appropriations Committee.

In 2012, Heidemann ran for University of Nebraska regent in the 5th district, against Mike Jones. He won with a narrow lead.

In 2013, Lieutenant Governor Rick Sheehy resigned after the Omaha World-Herald revealed that he had made several thousand late-night calls using his state-issued cell phone to four women, none his wife. Governor Dave Heineman named Heidemann the new lieutenant governor on February 13, 2013. In June 2014, Republican gubernatorial candidate Pete Ricketts named Heidemann as his running mate for the November 2014 election.

In September 2014, Heidemann's sister obtained a restraining order against him, alleging that he had physically assaulted her in the course of a dispute over the care of their elderly mother. Heidemann resigned from his post as lieutenant governor and withdrew from the Ricketts ticket. Heineman appointed Omaha legislator John E. Nelson to replace Heidemann as lieutenant governor; Ricketts named State Auditor Mike Foley as his new running mate.

Party political offices
Preceded by Rick Sheehy	Republican nominee for Lieutenant Governor of Nebraska; 2014	Succeeded by Mike Foley
