= Pam Brown (Nebraska politician) =

American politician (1952–2011)

Member of the Nebraska Legislature from the 6th district
- In office 1995–2006
- Preceded by: Brad Ashford
- Succeeded by: John E. Nelson

Personal details
- Born: September 12, 1952 San Antonio, Texas, U.S.
- Died: June 10, 2011 (aged 58)
- Children: 1
- Education: Broken Bow High School; University of Nebraska–Lincoln
- Occupation: Politician, businesswoman

Pamela K. Brown (September 12, 1952 – June 10, 2011) was an American businesswoman and legislator. She served as state senator from Omaha.

== Personal life ==
Born in San Antonio, Texas, she graduated from Broken Bow High School and University of Nebraska–Lincoln. She was married and had one child.

She was a member of the National Conference of State Legislatures Task Force on Genetic Technologies and was a board director for the United Way of the Midlands, the Safety and Health Council of Greater Omaha, and the Westside Schools Foundation.

== State legislature ==
Brown was elected in 1994 to represent the 6th Nebraska legislative district and reelected in 1998 and 2002. She sat on the Government, Military, and Veterans Affairs; Transportation and Telecommunications; and Intergovernmental Cooperation committees.

== Death ==
Brown died from ovarian cancer, aged 58, on June 10, 2011.

Preceded by Brad Ashford	Nebraska state senator-district 6; 1995–2006	Succeeded by John E. Nelson
