= David Maurstad =

American politician (born 1953)

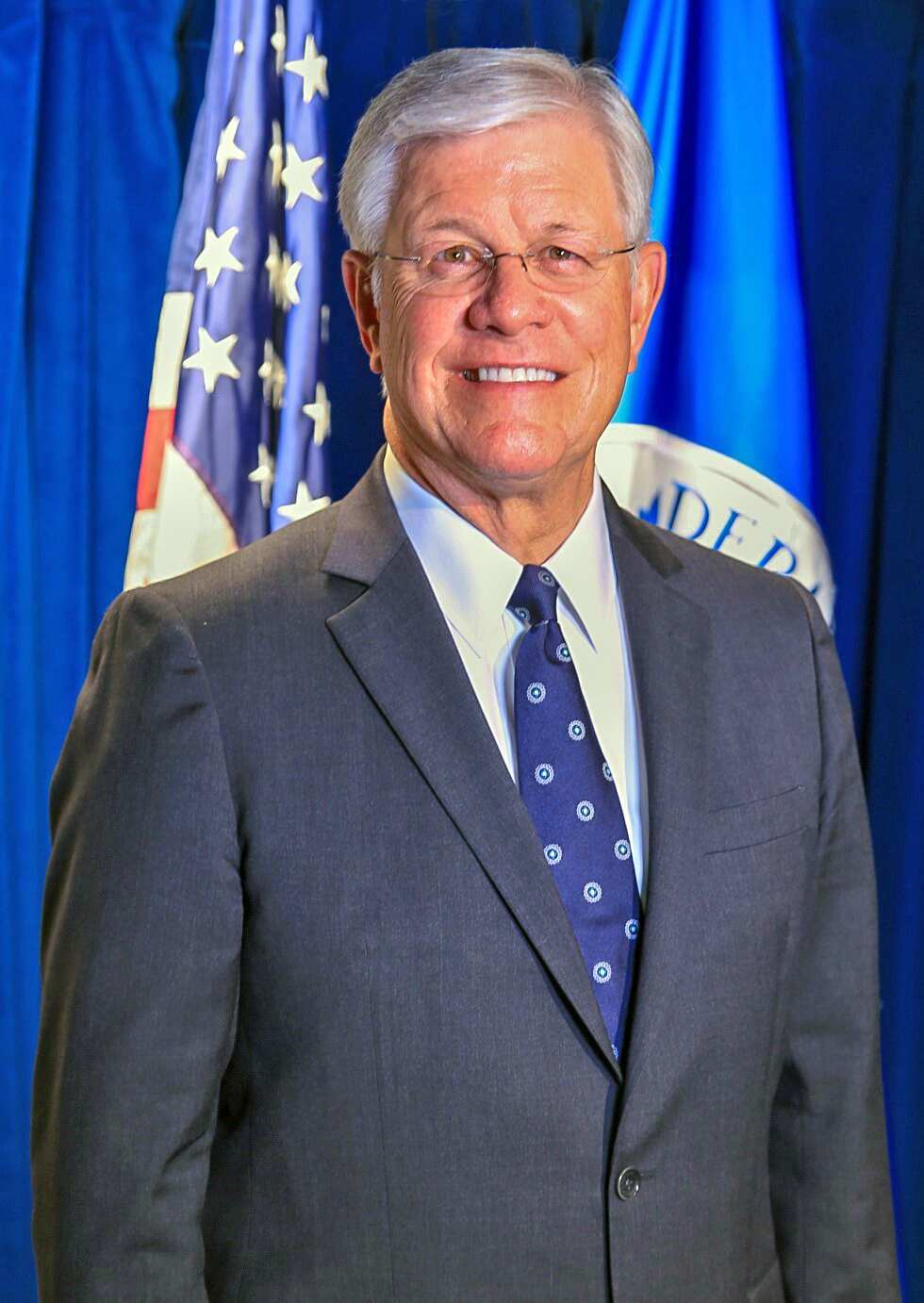

Lieutenant Governor of Nebraska
- In office January 7, 1999 – October 1, 2001
- Governor: Mike Johanns
- Preceded by: Kim Robak
- Succeeded by: Dave Heineman

Member of the Nebraska Legislature from the 30th district
- In office January 4, 1995 – January 6, 1999
- Preceded by: Dennis Byars
- Succeeded by: Dennis Byars

Personal details
- Born: August 25, 1953 (age 73) North Platte, Nebraska
- Party: Republican
- Education: North Platte Community College (A.A.); University of Nebraska–Lincoln (B.A., M.B.A.)

David Ingolf Maurstad (born August 26, 1953) is an American politician and government official who was the 36th lieutenant governor of Nebraska from 1999 to 2001. He was appointed Regional Director at Federal Emergency Management Agency (FEMA) Region 8 in 2001.

== Education ==
Maurstad received his Bachelor of Science in business administration and Master of Business Administration from the University of Nebraska–Lincoln.

== Career ==
Maurstad was an insurance agent for nearly 25 years and served as member of School District 15 board and the mayor of Beatrice and as a member of the Nebraska Legislature. He was lieutenant governor from 1999 to 2001. In 2001, he became director of the Federal Emergency Management Agency Region VIII (Colorado, Montana, North Dakota, South Dakota, Utah, Wyoming). He was appointed Federal Insurance Administrator and Assistant Administrator Mitigation Directorate at FEMA in 2006. He currently serves as its deputy associate administrator for Resilience and as the senior executive of the National Flood Insurance Program (NFIP).

Party political offices
Preceded by Kate Witek	Republican nominee for Lieutenant Governor of Nebraska; 1998	Succeeded by Dave Heineman
