= Charlie Janssen =

American politician

Auditor of Nebraska
- In office January 8, 2015 – January 5, 2023
- Governor: Pete Ricketts
- Preceded by: Mike Foley
- Succeeded by: Mike Foley

Member of the Nebraska Legislature from the 15th district
- In office January 2009 – December 2014
- Preceded by: Ray Janssen
- Succeeded by: David Schnoor

Personal details
- Born: January 15, 1971 (age 55) Fremont, Nebraska, U.S.
- Party: Republican
- Relatives: Ray Janssen (uncle)
- Education: Wayne State College (BS)

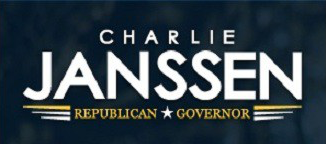
Charlie Janssen gubernatorial campaign, 2014

Charlie Janssen (born January 15, 1971) is an American politician from the U.S. state of Nebraska. A member of the Republican Party, Jansen served in the Nebraska Legislature from 2009 to 2014; in 2014, he was elected Nebraska Auditor of Public Accounts.

Janssen was born in Fremont, Nebraska. He graduated with a BS from Wayne State College in 1997. Janssen served in the United States Navy from 1989 to 1993. He lives in Fremont, and has two children.

Janssen served on the Fremont City Council before being elected to the Nebraska legislature. In 2008, he was elected to represent the 15th Nebraska legislative district replacing his uncle, Ray Janssen of Nickerson. In the Legislature, he sat on the Government, Military and Veterans Affairs, Intergovernmental Cooperation, and Transportation and Telecommunications committees. He briefly proposed an amendment to LB403 (a bill mandating the use of E-Verify for public employers, public contractors and companies seeking state tax breaks) which would have overturned the Dream Act of 2006 in Nebraska, however he later withdrew his amendment.

Janssen successfully ran as the Republican nominee for Nebraska Auditor of Public Accounts in the 2014 election to succeed Mike Foley and was sworn in on January 8, 2015, and was succeeded by Mike Foley in 2023.

Janssen was reelected in 2018 amidst controversy involving being discovered drinking at local bars for hours at a time during workdays on multiple occasions.

Party political offices
Preceded by Mike Foley	Republican nominee for Auditor of Nebraska; 2014, 2018	Succeeded by Mike Foley
Political offices
Preceded by Mike Foley	Auditor of Nebraska; 2015–2023	Succeeded by Mike Foley
