= Patricia S. Morehead =

American educator and politician

Patricia Stalder Morehead (born July 21, 1936) was an American educator and politician.

Morehead was born in Falls City, Nebraska. She went to MacMurray College in Jacksonville, Illinois and University of Nebraska Omaha. She received her bachelor's degree from the University of Nebraska in 1958. She lived in Beatrice, Nebraska and taught in the elementary and secondary private and public schools. Morehead served in the Nebraska Legislature from 1983 until 1988 and was involved with the Democratic Party.
