= Nebraska State Auditor =

Auditor of Public Accounts of Nebraska
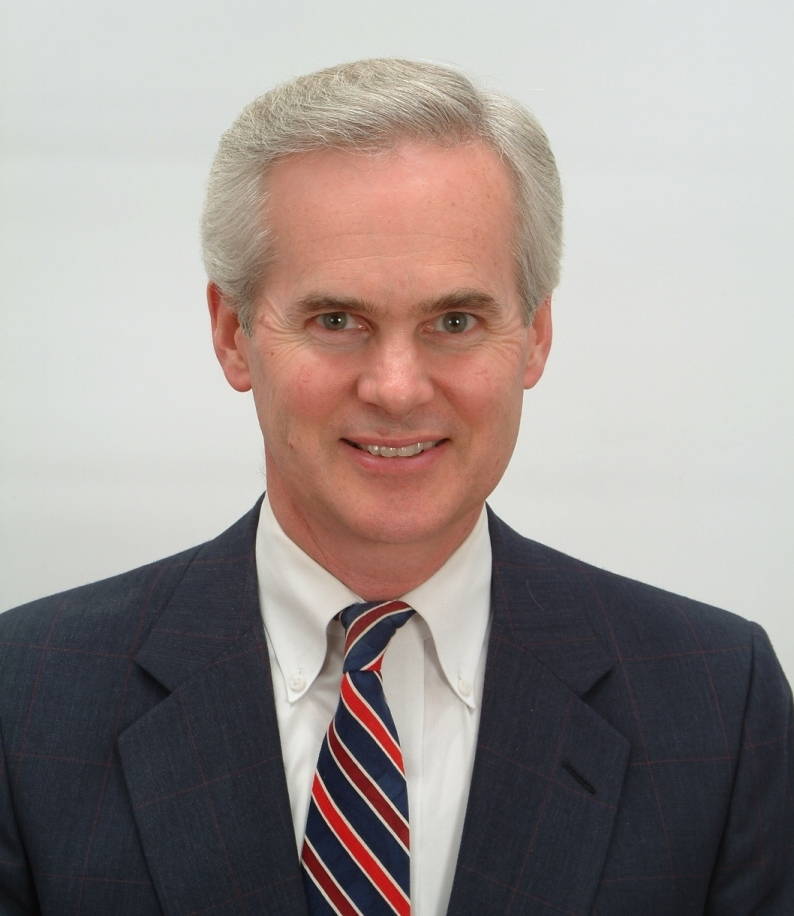
- Incumbent; Mike Foley since January 5, 2023
- Style: Mister or Madam Auditor (informal); The Honorable (formal)
- Member of: Board of State Canvassers; State Records Board; Suggestion Award Board
- Seat: Nebraska State Capitol; Lincoln, Nebraska
- Appointer: General election
- Term length: Four years, unlimited
- Constituting instrument: Article IV, Section 1, Nebraska Constitution
- Inaugural holder: Charles B. Smith (Nebraska Territory); John Gillespie (State of Nebraska)
- Formation: March 1, 1867 (159 years ago)
- Salary: $85,000
- Website: Official website

The auditor of public accounts of Nebraska, more commonly known as the "state auditor", is an elected constitutional officer in the executive branch of the U.S. state of Nebraska. Twenty-five individuals have held the office of auditor of public accounts since statehood. The current auditor is Mike Foley, a Republican.

== Powers and duties ==
The auditor of public accounts has the constitutional authority to audit all state fiscal activity and the fiduciary responsibility to promulgate audit standards applicable to all state agencies and local governments. To this end, the Office of the Auditor of Public Accounts (APA) engages in financial audits of every state agency, officer, board, bureau and commission, conducts the annual single audit of federal awards received by the state, and investigates both reported and alleged waste, fraud, and mismanagement throughout state and local government.

With respect to local governments, APA annually audits the accounts of most counties and each educational service district, registers school, municipal and public bonds, and prescribes uniform accounting and budgeting systems for all political subdivisions in Nebraska. Financial audits of all other local governments are generally prepared by private-sector auditors and reviewed by APA staff for compliance with the law and the duly promulgated audit standards.

Aside from financial audits, APA also conducts performance audits of local governments receiving more than $25,000 of state aid in any fiscal year and of state agencies when directed by the state legislature. These audits provide critical information to state lawmakers on the economy, efficiency, and effectiveness of public programs and influence public policy debates.

== List of territorial auditors ==
| No. | Auditor | Term | Party |
|---|---|---|---|
| 1 | Charles B. Smith | 1855–1858 | Unknown |
| * | Samuel L. Campbell (Note: Appointed but did not qualify.) | | Unknown |
| 2 | William E. Moore | 1858 | Unknown |
| 3 | Robert C. Jordan | 1858–1861 | Democratic |
| 4 | William E. Harvey | 1861–1865 | Democratic |
| 5 | John Gillespie | 1865–1867 | Republican |

== List of state auditors ==
Parties

Republican (18) Democratic (5) Fusion (Democratic/Populist) (1)

| No. | Auditor | Term | Party |
|---|---|---|---|
| 1 | John Gillespie (Note: Term began February 21, 1867.) | 1867–1873 | Republican |
| 2 | Jefferson B. Weston | 1873–1879 | Republican |
| 3 | Frederick W. Liedtke (Note: In office from 1879 to Nov. 11, 1880.) | 1879–1880 | Republican |
| 4 | John Wallichs (Note: In office from Nov. 12, 1880, to 1885.) | 1880–1885 | Republican |
| 5 | Heman A. Babcock | 1885–1889 | Republican |
| 6 | Thomas H. Benton | 1889–1893 | Republican |
| 7 | Eugene Moore | 1893–1897 | Republican |
| 8 | John F. Cornell | 1897–1901 | Fusion (Note: Joint Populist-Democratic ticket.) |
| 9 | Charles Weston | 1901–1905 | Republican |
| 10 | Edward N. Searle Jr. | 1905–1909 | Republican |
| 11 | Silas R. Barton | 1909–1913 | Republican |
| 12 | William B. Howard | 1913–1915 | Republican |
| 13 | William H. Smith | 1915–1919 | Democratic |
| 14 | George W. Marsh | 1919–1927 | Republican |
| 15 | Lucian B. Johnson | 1927–1931 | Republican |
| – | George W. Marsh | 1931–1933 | Republican |
| 16 | William B. Price (Note: Died Aug. 19, 1935.) | 1933–1935 | Democratic |
| 17 | Fred C. Ayres (Note: In office from Aug. 20, 1935, to 1937.) | 1935–1937 | Democratic |
| 18 | William H. Price (Note: William H. Price was not related to and did not even know his predecessor William B. Price.) | 1937–1939 | Democratic |
| 19 | Ray C. Johnson | 1939–1971 | Republican |
| 20 | Ray A. C. Johnson | 1971–1991 | Republican |
| 21 | John Breslow (Note: After winning re-election as a Democrat, John Breslow switched to the Republican Party in 1994.) | 1991–1999 | Republican |
| 22 | Kate Witek (Note: After winning re-election as a Republican, Kate Witek switched to the Democratic Party in 2006.) | 1999–2007 | Democratic |
| 23 | Mike Foley | 2007–2015 | Republican |
| 24 | Charlie Janssen | 2015–2023 | Republican |
| – | Mike Foley | 2023–present | Republican |
