= Dave Heineman =

Governor of Nebraska from 2005 to 2015

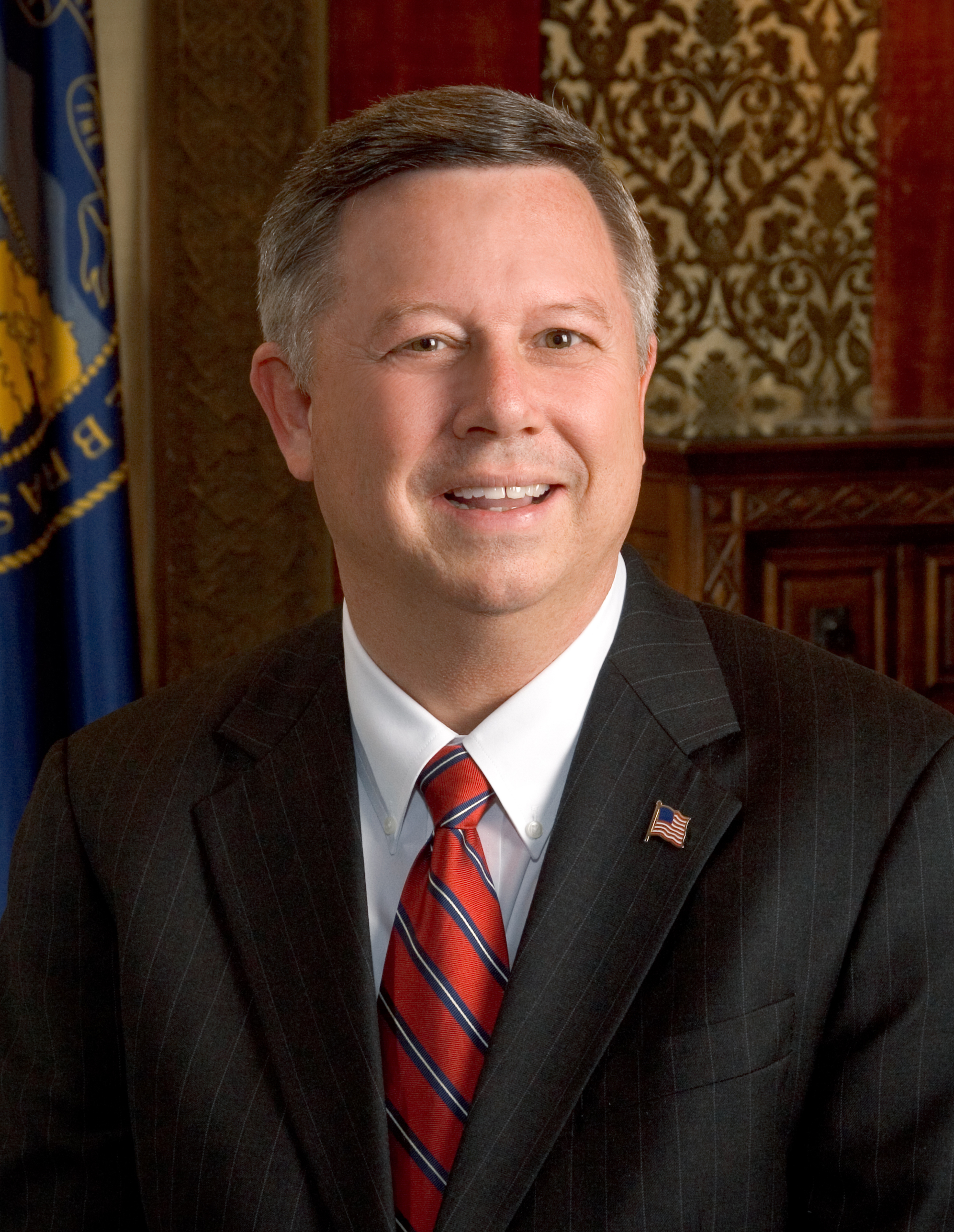
- Official portrait, 2006

39th Governor of Nebraska
- In office January 20, 2005 – January 8, 2015
- Lieutenant: Rick Sheehy; Lavon Heidemann; John Nelson
- Preceded by: Mike Johanns
- Succeeded by: Pete Ricketts

Chair of the National Governors Association
- In office July 17, 2011 – July 15, 2012
- Preceded by: Christine Gregoire
- Succeeded by: Jack Markell

37th Lieutenant Governor of Nebraska
- In office October 1, 2001 – January 20, 2005
- Governor: Mike Johanns
- Preceded by: David Maurstad
- Succeeded by: Rick Sheehy

37th Treasurer of Nebraska
- In office January 2, 1995 – October 1, 2001
- Governor: Ben Nelson; Mike Johanns
- Preceded by: Dawn Rockey
- Succeeded by: Lorelee Hunt Byrd

Personal details
- Born: David Eugene Heineman; May 12, 1948 (age 78) Falls City, Nebraska, U.S.
- Party: Republican
- Spouse: Sally Ganem
- Children: 1
- Education: United States Military Academy (BS)

Military service
- Branch/service: United States Army
- Years of service: 1970–1975
- Rank: Captain
- Unit: United States Army Rangers

David Eugene Heineman (born May 12, 1948) is an American politician who served as the 39th governor of Nebraska from 2005 to 2015. A member of the Republican Party, he was the 39th treasurer of Nebraska from 1995 to 2001 and 37th lieutenant governor of Nebraska from 2001 to 2005 under governor Mike Johanns. Heineman took over the governorship after Johanns resigned to become the U.S. Secretary of Agriculture.

Heineman won full four-year terms in the 2006 and 2010 elections. Due to this, he is the longest-serving Nebraska Governor with just under 10 years of service. Heineman was barred by term limits from seeking a third full four-year term in 2014 as the Constitution of Nebraska prohibits governors from seeking a third term. He was succeeded by businessman Pete Ricketts.

== Early life and education ==
Heineman was born in Falls City, Nebraska, the son of Irene (née Larkin) and Jean T. Heineman, a stock manager for J. C. Penney. He lived in a variety of places in eastern Nebraska during his youth, eventually attending high school in Wahoo, Nebraska. He graduated from the United States Military Academy in 1970. He served five years in the U.S. Army, leaving with the rank of captain. He also graduated from the Army Ranger training program.

== Career ==
Heineman served on the Fremont City Council from 1990 to 1994. He also served two terms as Nebraska State Treasurer from 1995 to 2001. He was appointed the 37th Lieutenant Governor of Nebraska by Governor Mike Johanns on October 1, 2001 after David Maurstad resigned to take a post in the administration of George W. Bush. He was elected to his first full term as Nebraska Lieutenant Governor in 2002 as Johanns's running mate.

=== Governor of Nebraska ===
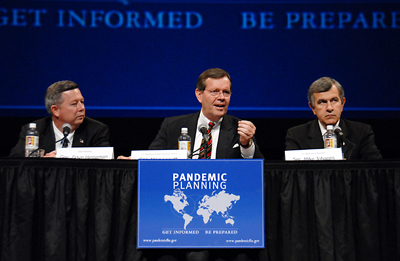
Heineman (left) with Secretary of Health and Human Services Mike Leavitt (center) and predecessor Mike Johanns (right) in 2006

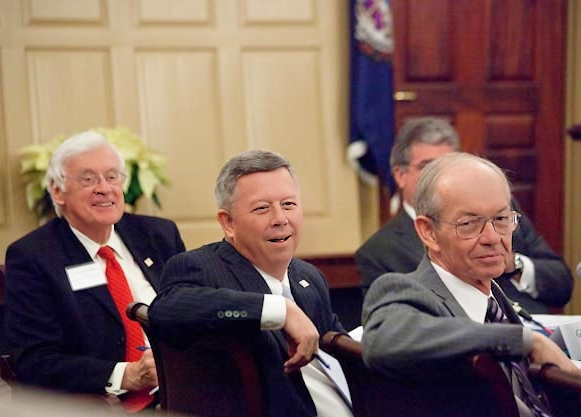
Former Governor of Virginia Gerald L. Baliles, Governor of Nebraska Dave Heineman and former Governor of Wyoming Jim Geringer at the Miller Center Higher Education Conference in 2010

Heineman became governor on January 20, 2005, following Mike Johanns's resignation to become United States Secretary of Agriculture in President George W. Bush's Cabinet. On April 11, 2005, he announced that he would be seeking election to a full four-year term. He had the backing of Nebraska Senator Chuck Hagel, although he faced a difficult challenge in the Republican primary from former Nebraska Cornhuskers football coach and U.S. Representative Tom Osborne. He took 49 percent of the more than 197,000 votes cast and Osborne 45 percent.

In the November 7, 2006 general election, Heineman defeated Democratic nominee David Hahn, securing 73.4% of the vote to Hahn's 24.5%. The Lincoln Journal Star's analysis of the 2006 gubernatorial race attributed Heineman's win to his opposition to rural school consolodation and the granting of resident college tuition rates to the children of undocumented immigrants, as both of these issues greatly helped him win over the state's many rural voters. This proved critical in the primary. While Osborne carried most of the Omaha and Lincoln areas, which cast more than two-thirds of Nebraska's vote, Heineman won by sufficient margins in western and central Nebraska to secure the nomination.

In 2010, Heineman signed two bills restricting abortion. One bill banned abortions at and after 20 weeks of pregnancy, based on the claim that fetuses of that age can feel pain; the other required that women seeking abortions be screened for mental-health problems.

Heineman was reelected in 2010 with 73.9 percent of the vote to Democratic nominee Mike Meister's 26.1%. In June 2011, Heineman became the first sitting governor to endorse Mitt Romney's presidential campaign.

As of 2012 Heineman worked with the Nebraska Legislature to pass the "largest tax relief package in Nebraska history". His website describes him as a "leader for Nebraska’s agricultural industry", stating that he secured trade deals for the export of wheat, soybeans and other commodities.

In January 2013, he approved a revised route for the Keystone Pipeline, that would avoid the environmentally sensitive Sandhills region, but cut through the High Plains Aquifer. Heineman was able to do this after a 2012 state law "let oil pipeline companies take their projects directly to the governor, bypassing the Nebraska Public Service Commission", which Nebraska justices upheld even though a lower court had blocked this law.

In March 2014, together with Nebraska Attorney General Jon Bruning, Heineman brought Nebraska into a lawsuit filed by Missouri Attorney General Chris Koster against California's egg production standards; in a press release, Heineman stated "This is about protecting Nebraska’s farmers and ranchers from the potential for regulatory burdens that hamper interstate trade." In October 2014, federal judge Kimberly Mueller dismissed the lawsuit, rejecting the states' challenge to Proposition 2, California's prohibition on the sale of eggs laid by caged hens kept in conditions more restrictive than those approved by California voters in a 2008 ballot initiative. Heineman had previously squared off against the Humane Society of the U.S., a champion of Proposition 2.

In April 2014, Heineman signed a bill striking the word "firearms" from the list of those items a governor may suspend during a state of emergency. In January 2015, Heinemann relinquished the governorship of Nebraska due to term limits. He was succeeded by fellow Republican Pete Ricketts.

In 2019, Heineman announced his support for Janet Palmtag in her candidacy for the Nebraska legislature.

== Personal life ==
Heineman is married to Sally Ganem, a former elementary school principal. They have one son.

== See also ==
- 2010 Nebraska gubernatorial election

Party political offices
Preceded by Frank Marsh	Republican nominee for Treasurer of Nebraska; 1994, 1998	Succeeded by Lorelee Hunt Byrd
Preceded by David Maurstad	Republican nominee for Lieutenant Governor of Nebraska; 2002	Succeeded by Rick Sheehy
Preceded by Mike Johanns	Republican nominee for Governor of Nebraska; 2006, 2010	Succeeded by Pete Ricketts
Political offices
Preceded by Dawn Rockey	Treasurer of Nebraska; 1995–2001	Succeeded by Lorelee Hunt Byrd
Preceded by David Maurstad	Lieutenant Governor of Nebraska; 2001–2005	Succeeded by Rick Sheehy
Preceded by Mike Johanns	Governor of Nebraska; 2005–2015	Succeeded by Pete Ricketts
Preceded by Christine Gregoire	Chair of National Governors Association; 2011–2012	Succeeded by Jack Markell
U.S. order of precedence (ceremonial)
Preceded by Kay A. Orr as Former Governor	Order of precedence of the United States; Within Nebraska	Succeeded by Jack Markell as Former Governor
Preceded by Kay A. Orr as Former Governor	Order of precedence of the United States; Outside Nebraska	Succeeded by Roy Romer as Former Governor
