= 2026 Nebraska Secretary of State election =

- November 3, 2026
| Candidate | Scott Petersen | Sarah Slattery |
| Party | Republican | Democratic |
| Popular vote | 398,061 | 301,483 |
| Percentage | 53.66% | 40.64% |
- Petersen: 40–50% 50–60% 60–70% 70–80% 80–90% >90% Slattery: 40–50% 50–60%
Secretary of state before election
Bob Evnen
Republican
Elected Secretary of state
Scott Petersen
Republican

The 2026 Nebraska Secretary of State election was held on November 3, 2026, to elect the Secretary of State of Nebraska. Primary elections were held on May 12. Incumbent Republican secretary of state Bob Evnen ran for re-election to a third term but was defeated in the Republican primary by Scott Petersen. Scott Petersen would go on to defeat Democratic challenger Sarah Slattery in the general election.

== Republican primary ==
=== Candidates ===
==== Nominee ====
- Scott Petersen, businessman and member of the state party's executive committee

==== Eliminated in primary ====
- Bob Evnen, incumbent secretary of state

=== Results ===
County results Petersen: 50–60%; 60–70%; 70–80%; Evnen: 50–60%

Congressional district results Petersen: 50–60%

Republican primary results
| Party | Candidate | Votes | % |
|---|---|---|---|
| Republican | Scott Petersen | 97,430 | 54.6 |
| Republican | Bob Evnen (incumbent) | 80,850 | 45.4 |
| Total votes | | 178,280 | 100.0 |

== Democratic primary ==
=== Candidates ===
==== Nominee ====
- Sarah Slattery, small business owner, professional chef, and candidate for state legislature in 2022

==== Eliminated in primary ====
- Lee Cimfel, retired accountant

=== Results ===
Democratic primary
| Party | Candidate | Votes | % |
|---|---|---|---|
| Democratic | Sarah Slattery | 109,344 | 91.2 |
| Democratic | Lee Cimfel | 10,608 | 8.8 |
| Total votes | | 119,952 | 100.0 |

== Third party and independent candidates ==
=== America First Party ===
==== Nominee ====
- Bob Krist, former chair of the Executive Board of the Nebraska Legislature (2015–2017) from the 10th district (2009–2019) and Democratic nominee for governor in 2018

=== Nebraska Working People Party ===
==== Nominee ====
- Paul Rumbaugh, project manager

== General election ==
=== Predictions ===
| Source | Ranking | As of |
|---|---|---|
| Sabato's Crystal Ball | Lean R | October 29, 2026 |

=== Post-primary endorsements ===
Scott Petersen (R)

Individuals

- Charles Herbster, agribusiness executive and candidate for governor in 2022

=== Results ===
2026 Nebraska Secretary of State election
| Party | Candidate | Votes | % | ±% |
|---|---|---|---|---|
| Republican | Scott Petersen | 393,501 | 54.0% | −46.0% |
| Democratic | Sarah Slattery | 293,529 | 40.3% | +40.3% |
| Working People | Paul Rumbaugh | 22,487 | 3.1% | N/A |
| America First | Bob Krist | 18,749 | 2.6% | N/A |
| Total votes | | | 100.0 | |
| Republican hold | | | | |
