= Scott Petersen (politician) =

American politician

Secretary of State of Nebraska
- Elect
- Assuming office January 2027
- Governor: Jim Pillen
- Succeeding: Bob Evnen

Personal details
- Born: 1959 or 1960 (age 66–67)
- Party: Republican
- Education: University of Iowa (BBA)

Scott Petersen (born 1959/1960) is an American businessman and politician from Nebraska. He was elected to be the next Secretary of State of Nebraska in the November 2026 elections.

== Personal life ==
Peterson earned a Bachelor of Business Administration from the University of Iowa.

== Political career ==
Petersen served as the chairman of the Douglas County Republican Party. He is also the vice chairman of Nebraska's 2nd Congressional District for the Nebraska Republican Party, which grants him a seat on their executive board.

Peterson ran for secretary of state of Nebraska in the 2026 elections. Critics such as Don Bacon argued that Petersen's election integrity concerns as, "going down a bad rabbit hole." He defeated incumbent Bob Evnen in the Republican Party primary election. His primary win was described as an upset. Petersen won the general election in November.

== Electoral history ==
=== 2026 Nebraska Secretary of State election ===
County results Petersen: 50–60%; 60–70%; 70–80%; Evnen: 50–60%

Republican primary
Party	Candidate	Votes	%
Republican	Scott Petersen	97,399	54.64
Republican	Bob Evnen (incumbent)	80,844	45.36
Total votes		178,243	100.00

General election
Party	Candidate	Votes	%
Republican	Scott Petersen	398,851	54.00
Democratic	Sarah Slattery	301,563	41.00
Nebraska Working People	Paul Rumbaugh	23,007	3.00
America First Party (2026)	Bob Krist	19,309	3.00
Total votes		742,730	100.00

Political offices
Preceded by Bob Evnen	Secretary of State of Nebraska; Taking office 2027	Elect
