= 2018 Nebraska elections =

The 2018 Nebraska elections were held on November 6, 2018. All of Nebraska's executive were up for election, as well as a United States Senate seat, all three of Nebraska's seats in the United States House of Representatives, half of the seats in the Nebraska Legislature, and seats on the Nebraska Public Service Commission, the State Board of Education, and the Board of Regents.

== United States Senate ==
Incumbent Republican Senator Deb Fischer ran for re-election to a second term. She defeated former Lancaster County Commissioner Jane Raybould, the Democratic nominee, in the general election with 58% of the vote.

2018 United States Senate election in Nebraska
Party	Candidate	Votes	%	±%
Republican	Deb Fischer (inc.)	403,151	57.69%	−0.08%
Democratic	Jane Raybould	269,917	38.62%	−3.61%
Libertarian	Jim Schultz	25,349	3.63	—
Write-in		466	0.07%	—
Majority		133,234	19.06%	+3.52%
Total votes		698,883	100.00%	
Republican hold				

== United States House of Representatives ==
All three Republican members of the United States House of Representatives from Nebraska ran for re-election. All three won re-election.

Results of the 2018 United States House of Representatives elections in Nebraska by district:

District	Republican		Democratic		Others		Total		Result
District	Votes	%	Votes	%	Votes	%	Votes	%	Result
District 1	141,712	60.36%	93,069	39.64%	0	0.00%	234,781	100%	Republican hold
District 2	126,715	51.00%	121,770	49.00%	0	0.00%	248,485	100%	Republican hold
District 3	163,650	76.72%	49,654	23.28%	0	0.00%	213,304	100%	Republican hold
Total	432,077	62.56%	264,493	35.19%	0	0.00%	696,570	100%	

== Governor and lieutenant governor ==
Incumbent Republican Governor Pete Ricketts ran for re-election to a second term. He was challenged in the general election by State Senator Bob Krist, the Democratic nominee. Ricketts defeated Krist with 59% of the vote.

2018 Nebraska gubernatorial election
Party	Candidate	Votes	%	±%
Republican	Pete Ricketts (inc.)	411,812	59.00%	+1.85%
Democratic	Bob Krist	286,169	41.00%	+1.77%
Majority		125,643	18.00%	+0.08%
Total votes		697,981	100.0%	
Republican hold				

== Secretary of State ==
2018 Nebraska Secretary of State election
- November 6, 2018
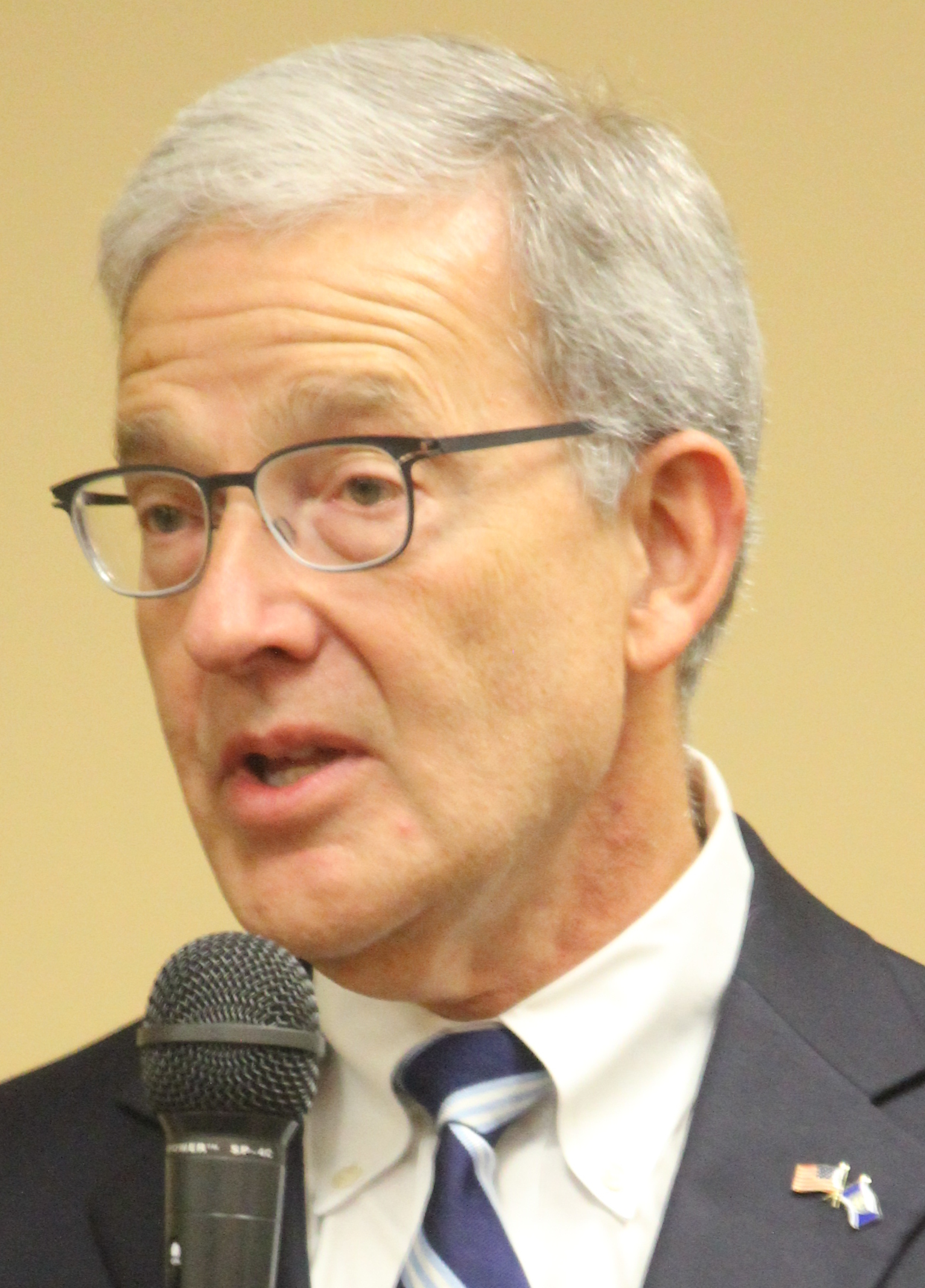

Nominee	Bob Evnen	Spencer Danner
Party	Republican	Democratic
Popular vote	406,632	263,982
Percentage	60.6%	39.4%
- Evnen: 50–60% 60–70% 70–80% 80–90% >90% Danner: 50–60% 60–70% 70–80% 80–90% >90% Tie: 50% No votes
Secretary of State before election
John A. Gale
Republican
Elected Secretary of State
Bob Evnen
Republican

Incumbent Republican Secretary of State John Gale declined to run for re-election to a fifth term. Bob Evnen, an attorney and former member of the State Board of Education, won the Republican primary against administrative assistant Debra Terrell, with 59% of the vote. In the general election, he was opposed by Spencer Danner, the former head of the Omaha Human Rights and Relations Department. Evnen defeated Tanner with 61% of the vote.

=== Republican primary ===
==== Candidates ====
- Bob Evnen, attorney and former member of the State Board of Education
- Debra Terrell, administrative assistant

Republican primary results
Party	Candidate	Votes	%
Republican	Bob Evnen	81,371	58.48%
Republican	Debra Perrell	57,816	41.52%
Total votes		139,187	100.00%

=== Democratic primary ===
==== Candidates ====
- Spencer Danner, consultant, former head of the Omaha Human Rights and Relations Department

==== Results ====
Democratic primary results
Party	Candidate	Votes	%
Democratic	Spencer Danner	76,769	100.00%
Total votes		76,769	100.00%

=== General election ===
2018 Nebraska Secretary of State general election results
Party	Candidate	Votes	%	±%
Republican	Bob Evnen	406,632	60.64%	−14.55%
Democratic	Spencer Danner	263,982	39.36%	—
Majority		142,650	21.27%	−29.11%
Turnout		670,614		
Republican hold				

== Auditor of Public Accounts ==
2018 Nebraska Auditor of Public Accounts election
- November 6, 2018
Nominee	Charlie Janssen	Jane Skinner
Party	Republican	Democratic
Popular vote	380,666	280,669
Percentage	57.56%	42.44%
- Janssen: 50–60% 60–70% 70–80% 80–90% >90% Skinner: 50–60%
Auditor of Public Accounts before election
Charlie Janssen
Republican
Elected Auditor of Public Accounts
Charlie Janssen
Republican

Incumbent Republican Auditor Charlie Janssen ran for re-election to a second term. He was challenged in the general election by Omaha librarian Jane Skinner. During the campaign, the Omaha World-Herald reported that, during a three-month investigation, Janssen repeatedly took "three-hour beer drinking lunches at a Lincoln sports bar," prompting calls from the Nebraska Democratic Party that he resign. Ultimately, though Janssen won re-election, it was by the thinnest margin of any statewide Republican candidate.

=== Republican primary ===
==== Candidates ====
- Charlie Janssen, incumbent Auditor of Accounts

==== Results ====
Republican primary results
Party	Candidate	Votes	%
Republican	Charlie Janssen (inc.)	132,365	100.00%
Total votes		132,365	100.00%

=== Democratic primary ===
==== Candidates ====
- Jane Skinner, Omaha librarian

==== Results ====
Democratic primary results
Party	Candidate	Votes	%
Democratic	Jane Skinner	75,699	100.00%
Total votes		75,699	100.00%

=== General election ===
2018 Nebraska Auditor of Public Accounts election
Party	Candidate	Votes	%	±%
Republican	Charlie Janssen (inc.)	380,666	57.56%	−1.51%
Democratic	Jane Skinner	280,669	42.44%	+1.51%
Majority		99,997	15.12%	−3.01%
Turnout		661,335		
Republican hold				

== State Treasurer ==
Incumbent Republican State Treasurer Don Stenberg was unable to seek a third consecutive term. State Senator John Murante defeated public accountant Taylor Royal to win the Republican primary and was unopposed in the general election.

=== Republican primary ===
==== Candidates ====
- John Murante, state senator
- Taylor Royal, public accountant, 2017 candidate for mayor of Omaha

==== Results ====
Republican primary results
Party	Candidate	Votes	%
Republican	John Murante	82,667	56.42%
Republican	Taylor Royal	63,844	43.58%
Total votes		146,511	100.00%

=== General election ===
2018 Nebraska State Treasurer general election
Party	Candidate	Votes	%
Republican	John Murante	516,210	100.00%
Total votes		516,210	100.00%
Republican hold			

== Attorney General ==
Incumbent Republican Attorney General Doug Peterson ran for re-election to a second term. He won the Republican primary unopposed and was originally set to face Democratic nominee Evangelos Argyrakis, an Omaha-area attorney. However, after Argyrakis won the primary unopposed, he was arrested for strangulation after an altercation involving his father, and he dropped out of the race. Though Democrats originally planned on replacing Argyrakis on the ballot, they ultimately did not do so, and Peterson was re-elected unopposed.

=== Republican primary ===
==== Candidates ====
- Doug Peterson, incumbent attorney general

==== Results ====
Republican primary results
Party	Candidate	Votes	%
Republican	Doug Peterson (inc.)	140,675	100.00%
Total votes		140,675	100.00%

=== Democratic primary ===
==== Candidates ====
- Evangelos Argyrakis, Omaha attorney

==== Results ====
Democratic primary results
Party	Candidate	Votes	%
Democratic	Evangelos Argyrakis	67,022	100.00%
Total votes		67,022	100.00%

=== General election ===
==== Predictions ====
Source	Ranking	As of
Governing	Safe R	October 26, 2018

==== Results ====
2018 Nebraska Attorney General election
Party	Candidate	Votes	%
Republican	Doug Peterson (inc.)	516,777	100.00%
Total votes		516,777	100.00%
Republican hold			

== Public Service Commission ==
=== District 1 ===
Incumbent Republican Commissioner Frank E. Landis declined to seek a sixth term. State Senator Dan Watermeier ran in the Republican primary against former Cass County Commissioner Ron Nolte and Scott Smathers, the executive director of the Nebraska Sportsmen's Foundation. Community organizer Christa Yoakum and software developer John Atkeison both ran in the Democratic primary. Watermeier won the Republican primary in a landslide, winning 59% of the vote, while Yoakum defeated Atkeison with 77% of the vote. In the general election, Watermeier and Yoakum took opposite positions on whether the Commission should ultimately approve the controversial Keystone XL pipeline, with Watermeier supporting the project and Yoakum opposing it. Watermeier ended up narrowly defeating Yoakum with 52% of the vote.

==== Republican primary ====
===== Candidates =====
- Ron Nolte, former Cass County commissioner
- Scott Smathers, executive director of the Nebraska Sportsmen's Foundation
- Dan Watermeier, state senator

===== Results =====
Republican primary results
Party	Candidate	Votes	%
Republican	Dan Watermeier	15,997	59.06%
Republican	Ron Nolte	6,518	24.06%
Republican	Scott Smathers	4,570	16.87%
Total votes		27,085	100.00%

==== Democratic primary ====
===== Candidates =====
- John Atkeison, software developer
- Christa Yoakum, community organizer

===== Results =====
Democratic primary results
Party	Candidate	Votes	%
Democratic	Christa Yoakum	18,510	76.67%
Democratic	John Atkeison	5,634	23.33%
Total votes		24,144	100.00%

==== General election ====
2018 Nebraska Public Service Commission, District 1 election
Party	Candidate	Votes	%
Republican	Dan Watermeier	73,891	51.68%
Democratic	Christa Yoakum	70,595	48.32%
Total votes		144,486	100.00%
Republican hold			

=== District 3 ===
Incumbent Republican Commissioner Tim Schram ran for re-election to a third term. He and his Democratic opponent, retired business executive Mike Forsythe, were both unopposed in their respective primary elections. Schram defeated Forsythe by a wide margin, winning 62% of the vote.

==== Republican primary ====
===== Candidates =====
- Tim Schram, incumbent Public Service commissioner

===== Results =====
Republican primary results
Party	Candidate	Votes	%
Republican	Tim Schram	24,596	100.00%
Total votes		24,596	100.00%

==== Democratic primary ====
===== Candidates =====
- Mike Forsythe, retired business executive

===== Results =====
Democratic primary results
Party	Candidate	Votes	%
Democratic	Mike Forsythe	14,439	100.00%
Total votes		14,439	100.00%

==== General election ====
2018 Nebraska Public Service Commission, District 3 election
Party	Candidate	Votes	%
Republican	Tim Schram (inc.)	99,986	62.19%
Democratic	Mike Forsythe	61,133	37.81%
Total votes		161,119	100.00%
Republican hold			

== State Board of Education ==
=== District 5 ===
2018 Nebraska State Board of Education District 5 election
- November 6, 2018
Nominee	Patricia Timm	Maris Bentley
Party	Nonpartisan	Nonpartisan
Popular vote	38,800	22,713
Percentage	63.1%	36.9%
- Timm: 50–60% 60–70% 70–80% Bentley: 50–60%
Board Member before election
Patricia Timm
Republican
Elected Board Member
Patricia Timm
Republican

Incumbent board member Patricia H. Timm ran for another term. She was challenged by retired teacher Maris Bentley, who founded a conservative advocacy group, Nebraskans for Founders' Values, which opposed changes made to the Omaha Public Schools sex education curriculum. Timm led Bentley in the nonpartisan primary with 70% of the vote and defeated her in a landslide in the general election, winning 63% of the vote.

==== Candidates ====
- Maris Bentley, retired Plattsmouth teacher
- Patricia H. Timm, incumbent board member

==== Primary election results ====
Nonpartisan primary results
Party	Candidate	Votes	%
Nonpartisan	Patricia H. Timm (inc.)	21,273	70.22%
Nonpartisan	Maris Bentley	9,023	29.78%
Total votes		30,296	100.00%

==== General election results ====
Nonpartisan general results
Party	Candidate	Votes	%
Nonpartisan	Patricia H. Timm (inc.)	38,800	63.08%
Nonpartisan	Maris Bentley	22,713	36.92%
Total votes		61,513	100.00%

=== District 6 ===
Incumbent board member Maureen Nickels was unopposed for another term.

==== Candidates ====
- Maureen Nickels, incumbent board member

==== Primary election results ====
Nonpartisan primary results
Party	Candidate	Votes	%
Nonpartisan	Maureen Nickels (inc.)	27,904	100.00%
Total votes		27,904	100.00%

==== General election results ====
Nonpartisan general results
Party	Candidate	Votes	%
Nonpartisan	Maureen Nickels (inc.)	56,395	100.00%
Total votes		56,395	100.00%

=== District 7 ===
Incumbent board member Molly O'Holleran declined to seek another term. Robin Stevens, the former superintendent of Schuyler Public Schools and O'Holleran's 2018 opponent, ran to succeed her and won unopposed.

==== Candidates ====
- Robin R. Stevens, former superintendent of Schuyler Public Schools, 2018 candidate for board

==== Primary election results ====
Nonpartisan primary results
Party	Candidate	Votes	%
Nonpartisan	Robin R. Stevens	30,727	100.00%
Total votes		30,727	100.00%

==== General election results ====
Nonpartisan general results
Party	Candidate	Votes	%
Nonpartisan	Robin R. Stevens	58,764	100.00%
Total votes		58,764	100.00%

=== District 8 ===
Incumbent board member Pat McPherson ran for re-election. He was challenged by retired teacher Bob Meyers, who ran for the position in 2018, and Deborah Neary, the Executive Director of the Midlands Mentoring Partnership. During McPherson's term on the board, he attracted controversy over a post on a defunct blog that he ran that referred to former President Barack Obama as a "half breed." McPherson denied that he authored the post and disavowed it, keeping a low profile on the board thereafter. Neary emerged as the frontrunner, winning 51% of the vote in the primary to McPherson's 28%. In the ensuing general election, Neary defeated McPherson with 59% of the vote.

==== Candidates ====
- Pat McPherson, incumbent board member
- Bob Meyers, retired teacher, 2018 candidate for board
- Deborah Neary, executive director of the Midlands Mentoring Partnership

==== Primary election results ====
Nonpartisan primary results
Party	Candidate	Votes	%
Nonpartisan	Deborah Neary	15,018	50.86%
Nonpartisan	Pat McPherson (inc.)	8,137	27.56%
Nonpartisan	Bob Meyers	6,373	21.58%
Total votes		29,528	100.00%

==== General election results ====
Nonpartisan general results
Party	Candidate	Votes	%
Nonpartisan	Deborah Neary	46,697	59.12%
Nonpartisan	Pat McPherson (inc.)	32,292	40.88%
Total votes		78,989	100.00%

== Board of Regents ==
Incumbent Regent Jim Pillen was unopposed for re-election.

=== District 3 ===
==== Candidates ====
- Jim Pillen, incumbent regent

==== Primary election results ====
Nonpartisan primary results
Party	Candidate	Votes	%
Nonpartisan	Jim Pillen (inc.)	29,077	100.00%
Total votes		29,077	100.00%

==== General election results ====
Nonpartisan general results
Party	Candidate	Votes	%
Nonpartisan	Jim Pillen (inc.)	55,440	100.00%
Total votes		55,440	100.00%

=== District 4 ===
Incumbent Regent Bob Whitehouse declined to seek re-election. Two Democrats, attorney Elizabeth O'Connor and adjunct professor Larry Bradley, who ran for this seat in 2012, ran to succeed him. O'Connor defeated Bradley in a landslide.

==== Candidates ====
- Larry Bradley, adjunct professor at the University of Nebraska Omaha, member of the Papio Missouri Natural Resources District, 2012 regent candidate
- Elizabeth O'Connor, attorney

==== Primary election results ====
Nonpartisan primary results
Party	Candidate	Votes	%
Nonpartisan	Elizabeth O'Connor	15,418	72.14%
Nonpartisan	Larry Bradley	5,958	27.86%
Total votes		21,376	100.00%

==== General election results ====
Nonpartisan general results
Party	Candidate	Votes	%
Nonpartisan	Elizabeth O'Connor	38,304	72.58%
Nonpartisan	Larry Bradley	14,478	27.42%
Total votes		52,782	100.00%

=== District 5 ===
Incumbent Regent Rob Schafer ran for re-election. He was challenged by former Regent Robert J. Prokop and photographer Joshua Redwine. Schafer and Prokop advanced to the general election from the primary, winning 43% and 24% of the vote, respectively. Schafer defeated Prokop in the general election by a wide margin, winning 61% of the vote to Prokop's 39%.

==== Candidates ====
- Robert J. Prokop, former regent
- Joshua Redwine, Lincoln photographer
- Rob Schafer, incumbent regent

==== Primary election results ====
Nonpartisan primary results
Party	Candidate	Votes	%
Nonpartisan	Rob Schafer (inc.)	16,354	43.30%
Nonpartisan	Robert J. Prokop	9,047	23.97%
Nonpartisan	Joshua Redwine	6,962	18.43%
Total votes		32,363	100.00%

==== General election results ====
Nonpartisan general results
Party	Candidate	Votes	%
Nonpartisan	Rob Schafer (inc.)	39,538	60.57%
Nonpartisan	Robert J. Prokop	25,732	39.43%
Total votes		65,270	100.00%

=== District 8 ===
Incumbent Regent Hal Daub, the former Mayor of Omaha and former Congressman, ran for re-election to a second term on the Board of Regents. He was challenged by Barbara Weitz, a retired faculty member at the University of Nebraska Omaha, and attorney Ryan Wilkins. Weitz and Daub placed first and second in the primary election and advanced to the general election, where Weitz narrowly defeated Daub with 53% of the vote.

==== Candidates ====
- Hal Daub, incumbent regent
- Barbara Weitz, retired social work professor at the University of Nebraska Omaha
- Ryan Wilkins, attorney

==== Primary election results ====
Nonpartisan primary results
Party	Candidate	Votes	%
Nonpartisan	Barbara Weitz	14,487	41.23%
Nonpartisan	Hal Daub (inc.)	13,774	39.22%
Nonpartisan	Ryan Wilkins	4,844	13.78%
Total votes		35,105	100.00%

==== General election results ====
Nonpartisan general results
Party	Candidate	Votes	%
Nonpartisan	Barbara Weitz	48,265	52.92%
Nonpartisan	Hal Daub (inc.)	42,941	47.08%
Total votes		91,206	100.00%
