= 2022 Nebraska Secretary of State election =

- November 8, 2022
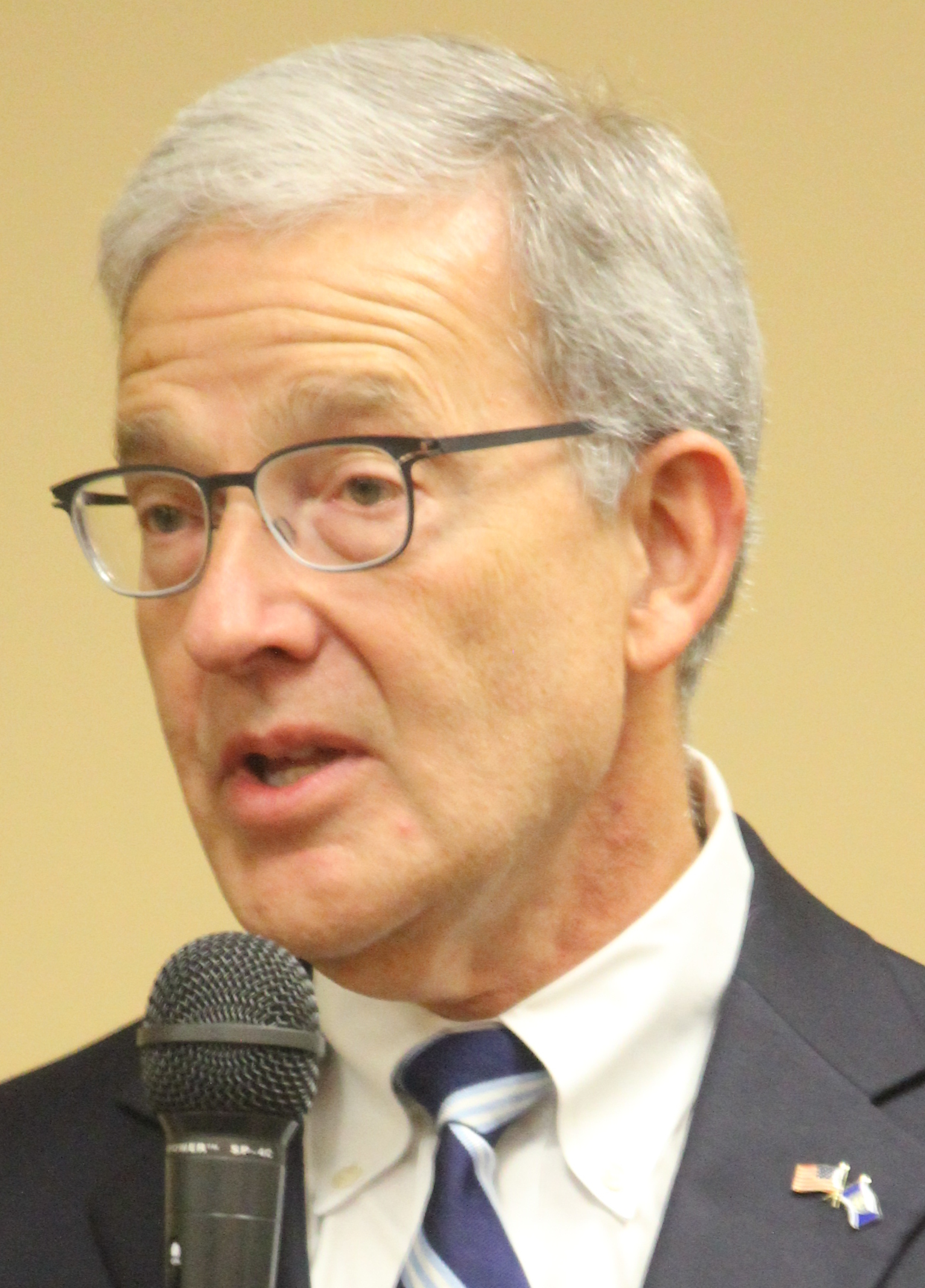
Nominee	Bob Evnen
Party	Republican
Popular vote	500,342
Percentage	100.00%
- County results Evnen: 90–100%
Secretary of State before election
Bob Evnen
Republican
Elected Secretary of State
Bob Evnen
Republican

The 2022 Nebraska Secretary of State election was held on November 8, 2022, to elect the Secretary of State of Nebraska. Incumbent Republican Bob Evnen won re-election to a second term unopposed. No Democratic candidates filed against him.

== Republican primary ==
=== Candidates ===
==== Nominee ====
- Bob Evnen, incumbent secretary of state

==== Eliminated in primary ====
- Robert J. Borer, retired fire captain and first-ever recipient of the Congressional Public Safety Officer Medal of Valor
- Rex Schroder, small business owner and retired fire chief

==== Endorsements ====
Robert J. Borer

Organizations

- America First Secretary of State Coalition

=== Primary results ===
Republican primary results by county Evnen: 30–40% 40–50% 50–60%; Borer: 30–40% 40–50% 50–60%; Schroder: 30–40% 40–50%

Republican primary results
Party	Candidate	Votes	%
Republican	Bob Evnen (inc.)	98,263	40.89
Republican	Robert J. Borer	72,150	30.02
Republican	Rex Schroder	53,628	22.29
Total votes		224,041	100.00

== General election ==
=== Predictions ===
Source	Ranking	As of
Sabato's Crystal Ball	Safe R	December 1, 2021
Elections Daily	Safe R	November 7, 2022

=== Results ===
2022 Nebraska Secretary of State election
Party	Candidate	Votes	%
Republican	Bob Evnen (inc.)	500,342	100.00%
Total votes		500,342	100.00%
Republican hold			

County Flips: Republican Hold Flip

==== By county ====
County	Bob Evnen Republican	
County	%	#
Adams	100%	7,988
Antelope	100%	2,038
Arthur	100%	225
Banner	100%	342
Blaine	100%	173
Boone	100%	2,094
Box Butte	100%	2,860
Boyd	100%	723
Brown	100%	1,090
Buffalo	100%	12,936
Burt	100%	2,250
Butler	100%	2,796
Cass	100%	8,842
Cedar	100%	3,349
Chase	100%	1,346
Cherry	100%	2,176
Cheyenne	100%	2,816
Clay	100%	2,280
Colfax	100%	2,008
Cuming	100%	2,752
Custer	100%	3,773
Dakota	100%	3,040
Dawes	100%	2,475
Dawson	100%	4,811
Deuel	100%	650
Dixon	100%	1,929
Dodge	100%	9,283
Douglas	100%	128,128
Dundy	100%	681
Fillmore	100%	1,981
Franklin	100%	1,043
Frontier	100%	937
Furnas	100%	1,657
Gage	100%	6,368
Garden	100%	785
Garfield	100%	655
Gosper	100%	743
Grant	100%	250
Greeley	100%	762
Hall	100%	12,127
Hamilton	100%	3,346
Harlan	100%	1,215
Hayes	100%	346
Hitchcock	100%	922
Holt	100%	3,411
Hooker	100%	331
Howard	100%	2,009
Jefferson	100%	2,243
Johnson	100%	1,326
Kearney	100%	2,239
Keith	100%	2,559
Keya Paha	100%	358
Kimball	100%	1,191
Knox	100%	3,104
Lancaster	100%	76,022
Lincoln	100%	10,158
Logan	100%	299
Loup	100%	278
Madison	100%	9,913
McPherson	100%	197
Merrick	100%	2,749
Morrill	100%	1,668
Nance	100%	980
Nemaha	100%	1,981
Nuckolls	100%	1,352
Otoe	100%	4,758
Pawnee	100%	887
Perkins	100%	990
Phelps	100%	3,224
Pierce	100%	2,528
Platte	100%	9,376
Polk	100%	1,749
Red Willow	100%	3,505
Richardson	100%	2,487
Rock	100%	514
Saline	100%	2,947
Sarpy	100%	47,556
Saunders	100%	7,760
Scotts Bluff	100%	8,318
Seward	100%	5,508
Sheridan	100%	1,683
Sherman	100%	978
Sioux	100%	454
Stanton	100%	2,110
Thayer	100%	1,794
Thomas	100%	280
Thurston	100%	939
Valley	100%	1,464
Washington	100%	7,097
Wayne	100%	2,542
Webster	100%	1,094
Wheeler	100%	283
York	100%	4,188

Counties that flipped from Democratic to Republican

- Thurston (largest village: Pender)
- Douglas (largest city: Omaha)
- Lancaster (largest city: Lincoln)
