= Bob Krist =

American politician

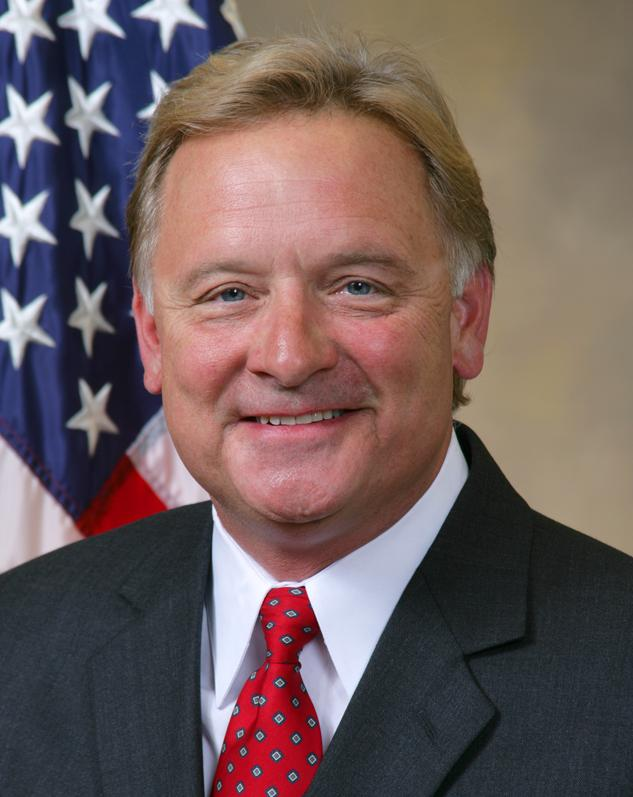

Chair of the Executive Board of the Nebraska Legislature
- In office January 7, 2015 – January 4, 2017
- Preceded by: John Wightman
- Succeeded by: Dan Watermeier

Member of the Nebraska Legislature from the 10th district
- In office September 11, 2009 – January 9, 2019
- Preceded by: Mike Friend
- Succeeded by: Wendy DeBoer

Personal details
- Born: March 29, 1957 (age 69) Omaha, Nebraska, U.S.
- Party: America First (2026–present)
- Other political affiliations: Republican (before 2017, 2022–2026); Democratic (2018–2022); Independent (2017–2018)
- Education: University of St. Thomas, Minnesota (BA); Webster University (MA)

Military service
- Allegiance: United States
- Branch/service: United States Air Force
- Years of service: 1979–2000
- Rank: Lieutenant Colonel
- Battles/wars: Operation Desert Shield; Operation Desert Storm
- Awards: Air Medal; Meritorious Service Medal; Air Force Commendation Medal; Aerial Achievement Medal

Robert J. Krist (born March 29, 1957) is an American politician who served as the Nebraska State Senator from the 10th district from 2009 to 2019. A member of the Republican Party until 2017, his district includes Bennington and part of Omaha. Krist joined the Democratic Party in 2018; he was its nominee for Governor of Nebraska in the 2018 election. He rejoined the Republican Party in 2022 before switching to the America First Party in 2026 to run for secretary of state of Nebraska.

== Personal life ==
Krist was born in Omaha, Nebraska. In 1980, he married Margaret Mary O'Connor.

== Education ==
Krist graduated with honors from Creighton Preparatory School in Omaha, Nebraska, in 1975. He attended the University of St. Thomas in Saint Paul, Minnesota, where he received a Bachelor of Arts degree in sociology in 1979. He obtained a Master of Arts degree in business administration and human relations from Webster University in St. Louis, Missouri in 1982.

== Military career ==
Krist served in the United States Air Force from 1979 to 2000 and retired as a lieutenant colonel. During his stint in the Air Force, Krist held key leadership positions directing critical missions including the high visibility Looking Glass mission at Offutt Air Force Base in Bellevue, Nebraska. He scheduled operations and flew missions on the Looking Glass EC-135 aircraft, which was the Airborne Command Post for Strategic Air Command.

Among other operations, Krist served in both Operation Desert Shield and Desert Storm. In 1998, he was chosen as an Active Duty Air Force Advisor to then-Nebraska Governor Ben Nelson and the Adjutant General of Nebraska.

In 2014, Krist was inducted into the Nebraska Aviation Hall of Fame. In 2017, the Secretary of State of Nebraska, John Gale, appointed him to serve on the Honor a Veteran Honorary Steering Committee.

== Nebraska Legislature ==
Krist was appointed to the Nebraska Legislature by Governor Dave Heineman on September 11, 2009, to replace Senator Mike Friend. He won election to the office in 2010 and was reelected in 2014. Krist represented the 10th Legislative District, an area encompassing some of the northwest portion of Omaha, the entire city of Bennington and a north-central portion of Douglas County. In 2015, senators elected him Chairman of the Executive Board of the Legislative Council and he also served as Chairman of the Referencing Committee.

His standing committee assignments in the Legislature include the Judiciary Committee, the Agriculture Committee, and the General Affairs Committee. He also serves on the Rules Committee and the Justice Reinvestment Oversight Committee.

== 2018 gubernatorial campaign ==
In 2017, Krist expressed interest in running for the governorship of Nebraska in 2018. He initially indicated that he might run against incumbent Pete Ricketts in the Republican primary. In July 2017, he stated that he would run as a third-party candidate and that he would remain a Republican until the end of his term in the Nebraska Legislature. In September 2017, Krist announced his candidacy; he stated that he would change his party registration to "nonpartisan" later that day. In February 2018, he changed his registration to the Democratic Party and said he would run for that party's gubernatorial nomination.

Krist won the primary election on May 15, 2018, defeating two other candidates. He was defeated in the general election on November 6, 2018 by Ricketts, with 41% of the vote against Ricketts's 59%.

== 2026 secretary of state campaign ==
Krist considered running for secretary of state of Nebraska in 2026 as an independent candidate, though initially decided against a campaign. He was approached by members of the America First Party, who convinced him to run under their nomination. He changed his affiliation to the America First Party and was chosen as their nominee for secretary of state.

== Occupation ==
Krist is currently the owner of Dyna-Tech Aviation. He has served as a pilot since 2000 and the Chief Pilot since 2002.

== Electoral history ==
=== 2018 ===
Democratic primary
Party	Candidate	Votes	%
Democratic	Bob Krist	54,992	59.81
Democratic	Vanessa Gayle Ward	26,478	28.80
Democratic	Tyler Davis	10,472	11.39
Total votes		91,942	100.00

Nebraska gubernatorial election, 2018
Party	Candidate	Votes	%	±%
Republican	Pete Ricketts (incumbent)	411,812	59.00%	+1.85%
Democratic	Bob Krist	286,169	41.00%	+1.77%
Total votes		697,981	100.00%	N/A
Republican hold				

== See also ==
- List of American politicians who switched parties in office

Party political offices
Preceded by Chuck Hassebrook	Democratic nominee for Governor of Nebraska; 2018	Succeeded by Carol Blood
