= Harold Sieck =

American politician (1916–1988)

Member of the Nebraska Legislature from the 24th district
- In office January 3, 1979 – January 7, 1987
- Preceded by: Doug Bereuter
- Succeeded by: Scott Moore

Personal details
- Born: February 29, 1916 Pleasant Dale, Nebraska
- Died: March 24, 1988 (aged 72) Pleasant Dale, Nebraska
- Party: Democratic
- Spouse: Elsie Meinberg (m. 1942)
- Children: 5 (Thomas, Barbara, Roger, Gerald, Annette)
- Occupation: Farmer

Harold Sieck (February 29, 1916 – March 24, 1988) was a Democratic politician and farmer from Nebraska who served as a member of the Nebraska Legislature from the 24th district from 1979 to 1987.

== Early career ==
Sieck was born in Pleasant Dale, Nebraska, in 1916, and graduated from Pleasant Dale High School. He worked on his family farm, and was active in water and soil conservation efforts, developing minimum tillage techniques on his farm and lobbying for the creation of natural resources districts in the state. Sieck helped organize the creation of the Seward Rural Power District, and served on the board after it was established.

== Nebraska Legislature ==
In 1978, when State Senator Doug Bereuter ran for Congress to succeed Charles Thone, Sieck ran to succeed Bereuter in the 24th district. In the nonpartisan primary, he faced former Polk County Supervisor Burdette Flodman, journalist John Gleason, and York Board of Education member Raymond Ratliff. Sieck placed first in the primary by a wide margin, winning 41 percent of the vote to Ratliff's 23 percent, and they both advanced to the general election. Sieck only narrowly defeated Ratliff in the general election, winning his first term with 50.6 percent of the vote and by a margin of 98 votes.

Sieck ran for a second term in 1982, and he was challenged by Dorris Marxhausen, a member of the Seward Planning Commission and civic activist. In the primary, he placed first over Marxhausen in a landslide, receiving 64 percent of the vote to her 36 percent. In the general election, he defeated Marxhausen by a wide margin, winning his second term, 57–43 percent.

In 1985, Sieck announced that he would not run for a third term in 1986.

== Death ==
Sieck died on March 24, 1988.
