= Allen Beermann =

American politician (born 1940)

- Official portrait, 1972

Secretary of State of Nebraska
- In office January 7, 1971 – January 9, 1995
- Governor: Norbert Tiemann; J. James Exon; Charles Thone; Bob Kerrey; Kay A. Orr; Ben Nelson
- Preceded by: Frank Marsh Jr.
- Succeeded by: Scott Moore

Personal details
- Born: January 14, 1940 (age 86) Sioux City, Iowa or Dakota County, Nebraska
- Party: Republican
- Spouse: Linda R. Dierking (m. 1971; died 2022)
- Children: 2

Allen J. Beermann (born January 14, 1940) is an American politician who served as the 24th Secretary of State of Nebraska from 1971 to 1995. Serving for 24 years, he holds the title of longest serving Secretary of State of Nebraska. He is a member of the Republican Party.

== Biography ==
Allen J. Beermann was born on January 14, 1940, as the son of German immigrants, in either Sioux City, Iowa, or in Dakota County, Nebraska. (Note: Sources vary on where he was born.) In 1958, he graduated from South Sioux City High School, and in 1965, he graduated from Creighton University School of Law with a Juris Doctor degree. In September 1967, he was appointed as the deputy secretary of state of Nebraska by Governor Norbert Tiemann. On January 7, 1971, Beermann was sworn in as the 24th secretary of state of Nebraska. Serving under six governors, he held the position for 24 years until 1995, when he was succeeded by Scott Moore. The following year, Beermann would become the executive director of the Nebraska Press Association.

== Personal life ==
On May 23, 1971, Beermann married Linda R. Dierking, a weather reporter from Nebraska City, with whom he had two children. The two remained married for the next 51 years, until Linda's death in 2022. In March 2024, he published a book called Allen Beermann: Nebraska’s Ambassador to the World, an autobiography about his life.
