= 2012 Nebraska elections =

The 2012 Nebraska state elections took place on November 6, 2012. At the federal level, voters elected a member of the United States Senate and three members of the United States House of Representatives. At the state level, half of the seats in the Nebraska Legislature were on the ballot, as well as positions on the Nebraska Public Service Commission, State Board of Education, and Board of Regents. Voters also cast ballots in judicial retention elections and on four separate constitutional amendments.

== United States Senate ==
Incumbent Democratic Senator Ben Nelson declined to seek re-election to a third term. Republican Deb Fischer won the Republican primary to succeed him over Attorney General Jon Bruning and State Treasurer Don Stenberg. In the general election, she faced former Senator Bob Kerrey, and defeated him with 58% of the vote, picking up the seat for Republicans.

2012 United States Senate election in Nebraska
Party	Candidate	Votes	%	±%
Republican	Deb Fischer	455,593	57.77%	+21.65%
Democratic	Bob Kerrey	332,979	42.23%	−21.65%
Majority		122,614	22.69%	−5.07%
Total votes		540,337	100.00%	
Republican gain from Democratic				

== United States House of Representatives ==
Incumbent Republican Congressmen Jeff Fortenberry of the 1st district, Lee Terry of the 2nd district, and Adrian Smith of the 3rd district ran for re-election. All three ultimately won re-election.

== Public Service Commission ==
=== District 1 ===
Incumbent Commissioner Frank Landis ran for re-election, and faced no opposition in either the Republican primary or general election.

==== Republican primary ====
===== Candidates =====
- Frank Landis, incumbent Public Service Commissioner

===== Results =====
Republican primary results
Party	Candidate	Votes	%
Republican	Frank Landis	27,989	100.00%
Total votes		27,989	100.00%

==== General election ====
2012 Nebraska Public Service Commission, District 1 election
Party	Candidate	Votes	%
Republican	Frank Landis (inc.)	114,289	100.00%
Total votes		114,289	100.00%
Republican hold			

=== District 3 ===
Incumbent Commissioner Tim Schram ran for re-election, and faced no opposition in either the Republican primary or general election.

==== Republican primary ====
===== Candidates =====
- Tim Schram, incumbent Public Service Commissioner

===== Results =====
Republican primary results
Party	Candidate	Votes	%
Republican	Tim Schram	27,975	100.00%
Total votes		27,975	100.00%

==== General election ====
2012 Nebraska Public Service Commission, District 3 election
Party	Candidate	Votes	%
Republican	Tim Schram (inc.)	133,590	100.00%
Total votes		133,590	100.00%
Republican hold			

== Board of Education ==
=== District 1 ===
Incumbent Board member Bob Evnen declined to seek a second full term. Lillie Larsen, a former member of the Lincoln Board of Education, and Robert Van Valkenburg, a consultant, ran to replace him. Though the race was formally nonpartisan, Larsen was a Democrat and Van Valkenburg was a Republican. Larsen defeated Van Valkenburg in a landslide, winning 67% of the vote in the primary and then 69% of the vote in the general election.

==== Candidates ====
- Lillie Larsen, former Lincoln Board of Education member
- Bob Van Valkenburg, consultant

==== Primary election results ====
Nonpartisan primary result
Party	Candidate	Votes	%
Nonpartisan	Lillie Larsen	22,388	67.06%
Nonpartisan	Bob Van Valkenburg	10,997	32.94%
Total votes		33,385	100.00%

==== General election results ====
Nonpartisan general results
Party	Candidate	Votes	%
Nonpartisan	Lillie Larsen	54,982	69.12%
Nonpartisan	Bob Van Valkenburg	24,555	30.88%
Total votes		79,537	100.00%

=== District 2 ===
Incumbent Board member Mark Quandahl was unopposed for re-election.

==== Candidates ====
- Mark Quandahl, incumbent Board member

==== Primary election results ====
Nonpartisan primary result
Party	Candidate	Votes	%
Nonpartisan	Mark Quandahl (inc.)	23,610	100.00%
Total votes		23,610	100.00%

==== General election results ====
Nonpartisan general results
Party	Candidate	Votes	%
Nonpartisan	Mark Quandahl (inc.)	73,212	100.00%
Total votes		73,212	100.00%

=== District 3 ===
Incumbent Board member Jim Scheer opted to run for the state legislature rather than seek re-election. Rachel Wise, a former school administrator, and the chief operating officer of an education nonprofit, and Tom Schommer, a businessman who owned a wireless communications company, both ran to succeed Scheer. Wise, a Democrat, campaigned on supporting local control, reevaluating standardized testing requirements, and strengthening teacher preparation efforts, while Schommer emphasized that, as an outsider "not from the education industry," he had "no vested interest or agenda in running for the office, other than just improving achievement levels for kids." Schommer placed first in the primary election, but in the general, Wise defeated him with 56% of the vote.

==== Candidates ====
- Rachel Wise, former school administrator and executive director of Building Bright Futures
- Tom Schommer, businessman

==== Primary election results ====
Nonpartisan primary result
Party	Candidate	Votes	%
Nonpartisan	Tom Schommer	16,702	54.32%
Nonpartisan	Rachel Wise	14,046	45.68%
Total votes		30,748	100.00%

==== General election results ====
Nonpartisan general results
Party	Candidate	Votes	%
Nonpartisan	Rachel Wise	43,521	56.37%
Nonpartisan	Tom Schommer	33,706	43.63%
Total votes		77,227	100.00%

=== District 4 ===
Incumbent Board member Rebecca Valdez was unopposed for re-election.

==== Candidates ====
- Rebecca Valdez, incumbent Board member

==== Primary election results ====
Nonpartisan primary result
Party	Candidate	Votes	%
Nonpartisan	Rebecca Valdez (inc.)	16,781	100.00%
Total votes		16,781	100.00%

==== General election results ====
Nonpartisan general results
Party	Candidate	Votes	%
Nonpartisan	Rebecca Valdez (inc.)	52,557	100.00%
Total votes		52,557	100.00%

== Board of Regents ==
=== District 3 ===
Incumbent Regent Chuck Hassebrook opted to 2012 United States Senate election in Nebraska#run for the U.S. Senate rather than seek re-election. Veterinarian Jim Pillen, who also owned his family's pork business; attorney David Couple; and manufacturing executive Tony Raimondo Jr. all ran to succeed him. During the campaign, Pillen and Copple were endorsed by Nebraskans United for Life and Nebraska Right to Life, two pro-life groups that were opposed to embryonic stem cell research at the University of Nebraska Medical Center, while Raimondo was recommended by Research Nebraska, which supported continuing the research. Pillen placed first in the primary election, winning 46% of the vote, and advanced to the general election against Copple, who won 28%. Pillen overwhelmingly defeated Copple, winning 64% of the vote in the general election.

==== Candidates ====
- Jim Pillen, veterinarian and businessman
- David Copple, Norfolk attorney
- Tony Raimondo Jr., manufacturing executive

==== Primary election results ====
Nonpartisan primary result
Party	Candidate	Votes	%
Nonpartisan	Jim Pillen	18,095	45.78%
Nonpartisan	David Copple	10,882	27.54%
Nonpartisan	Tony Raimondo, Jr.	5,958	15.08%
Total votes		39,935	100.00%

==== General election results ====
Nonpartisan general results
Party	Candidate	Votes	%
Nonpartisan	Jim Pillen	50,339	64.19%
Nonpartisan	David Copple	28,083	35.81%
Total votes		78,422	100.00%

=== District 4 ===
Incumbent Regent Bob Whitehouse ran for re-election to a second term. He was challenged by Larry Bradley, an adjunct professor at the University of Nebraska Omaha and a member of the Papio-Missouri River Natural Resources District board. During the campaign, Bradley, a Democrat, attacked the Board of Regents for cutting back on football and wrestling programs at UNO, and filed a public records request for records related to the cancellations. The controversy over the stem cell research emerged during the campaign, with Whitehouse supported by the pro-research groups and Bradley by the pro-life groups. Whitehouse defeated Bradley with 54% of the vote in the primary and with 55% of the vote in the general election.

==== Candidates ====
- Bob Whitehouse, incumbent Board member
- Larry Bradley, member of the Papio-Missouri River Natural Resources District board, adjunct professor at the University of Nebraska Omaha

==== Primary election results ====
Nonpartisan primary result
Party	Candidate	Votes	%
Nonpartisan	Bob Whitehouse (inc.)	10,271	54.44%
Nonpartisan	Larry Bradley	8,602	45.56%
Total votes		18,873	100.00%

==== General election results ====
Nonpartisan general results
Party	Candidate	Votes	%
Nonpartisan	Bob Whitehouse (inc.)	31,801	55.19%
Nonpartisan	Larry Bradley	25,818	44.81%
Total votes		57,619	100.00%

=== District 5 ===
Incumbent Regent Jim McClurg declined to seek re-election. State Senator Lavon Heidemann, insurance company owner Mike Jones, and former Regent Robert Prokop ran to succeed him. During the campaign, pro-life groups endorsed Heidemann and Prokop, while the pro-research group recommended Jones. In the primary election, Heidemann placed first with 46% of the vote and advanced to the general election with Jones, who won 33% of the vote. Heidemann ultimately defeated Jones by a narrow margin, winning 53% of the vote in the general election.

==== Candidates ====
- Lavon Heidemann, State Senator
- Mike Jones, insurance company owner
- Robert J. Prokop, former Regent

==== Primary election results ====
Nonpartisan primary result
Party	Candidate	Votes	%
Nonpartisan	Lavon Heidemann	15,291	45.50%
Nonpartisan	Mike Jones	11,019	32.79%
Nonpartisan	Robert J. Prokop	7,283	21.71%
Total votes		33,593	100.00%

==== General election results ====
Nonpartisan general results
Party	Candidate	Votes	%
Nonpartisan	Lavon Heidemann	41,974	52.52%
Nonpartisan	Mike Jones	37,907	47.48%
Total votes		79,881	100.00%

=== District 8 ===
Incumbent Regent Randy Ferlic declined to seek re-election. A crowded field emerged to replace him, with former Omaha Mayor and Congressman Hal Daub; attorney Ann Ferlic Ashford, the daughter of Ferlic and wife of State Senator Brad Ashford; investment banker Mark Lakers, who was the original Democratic nominee for Governor in 2010 before dropping out after a campaign finance scandal; and businessman Carl Jennings all running. Lakers, a Democrat, was supported by the pro-life groups opposed to stem-cell research, while the pro-research group recommended Daub and Ashford, who were Republicans. Daub won the primary election by a wide margin, winning 47% of the vote, while Ashford won 30% of the vote and advanced to the general election. Daub centered his campaign on improving the quality of classroom instruction, maintaining affordable tuition, and establishing partnerships with private companies, while Ashford campaigned in support of cost-effective tuition and ensuring that on-time graduation rates increased. Daub ultimately narrowly defeated Ashford, winning 53% of the vote.

==== Candidates ====
- Hal Daub, former Mayor of Omaha, former Congressman
- Ann Ferlic Ashford, attorney
- Carl Jennings, businessman
- Mark Lakers, investment banker

==== Primary election results ====
Nonpartisan primary result
Party	Candidate	Votes	%
Nonpartisan	Hal Daub	15,768	46.66%
Nonpartisan	Ann Ferlic Ashford	9,972	29.50%
Nonpartisan	Carl Jennings	3,133	9.27%
Nonpartisan	Mark Lakers	2,561	7.58%
Total votes		33,434	100.00%

==== General election results ====
Nonpartisan general results
Party	Candidate	Votes	%
Nonpartisan	Hal Daub	50,498	52.63%
Nonpartisan	Ann Ferlic Ashford	45,452	47.37%
Total votes		95,950	100.00%
