= Scott Moore (Nebraska politician) =

American politician (born 1960)

25th Secretary of State of Nebraska
- In office January 5, 1995 – December 18, 2000
- Preceded by: Allen Beermann
- Succeeded by: John A. Gale

Member of the Nebraska Legislature from the 24th district
- In office January 7, 1987 – January 4, 1995
- Preceded by: Harold Sieck
- Succeeded by: Elaine Stuhr

Personal details
- Born: October 9, 1960 (age 65) York, Nebraska
- Party: Republican
- Spouse: Danene J. Tushar
- Education: University of Nebraska–Lincoln (B.A.)
- Occupation: Farmer

Scott Moore (born October 9, 1960) is a Republican politician and railroad company executive from Nebraska. He served as the Secretary of State of Nebraska from 1995 to 2000, and resigned in 2000 to become the Director of Government Affairs at Union Pacific Railroad, retiring as Senior Vice President of Corporate Relations and Chief Administrative Officer in 2023.

== Early career ==
Moore was born in York, Nebraska, and graduated from Benedict High School in Benedict. He attended the University of Nebraska–Lincoln, graduating with his bachelor's degree in political science, and served as a legislative aide to State Senators Rod Johnson and Harold Sieck.

== Nebraska Legislature ==
In 1986, after State Senator Harold Sieck announced that he would not seek re-election, Moore ran to succeed him in the 24th district, which included Seward and York counties, and parts of Polk County. In the primary election, he faced former Garland Village Board member and businessman Bill Hartmann, insurance salesman Robert Wambold, and Nebraska Wesleyan University junior Steven Fillman. Moore placed first in the primary, winning 47 percent of the vote to Hartmann's 39 percent, and they advanced to the general election. Moore ultimately defeated Hartmann with 57 percent of the vote.

Moore ran for re-election in 1990, and was challenged by Marvin Havlat, a farmer who had previously been convicted of conspiracy to cultivate marijuana. Moore placed first in the primary by a wide margin, winning 82 percent of the vote, and was re-elected over Havlat in the general election, 83–17 percent.

== Nebraska Secretary of State ==
Secretary of State Allen Beermann announced in 1994 that he would not seek re-election to a seventh term, and Moore announced that he would run to succeed him. He faced businessman Rick Logsdon in the Republican primary, and defeated him in a landslide, winning 76 percent of the vote. In the general election, Moore was opposed by Democratic nominee Allan Eurek, an attorney. Moore defeated Eurek, winning 63 percent of the vote to Eurek's 37 percent.

Moore ran for re-election in 1998. He was challenged by Democrat Kent Bernbeck, a petition activist who managed campaigns to defeat Nebraska Supreme Court Justice David Lanphier and enact term limits in 1996, and Libertarian Michaelle Miller, a college student. Moore was re-elected in a landslide, winning 65 percent of the vote to Bernbeck's 28 percent and Miller's 7 percent.

== 2000 U.S. Senate campaign ==
After initially announcing that he would seek a third term in the U.S. Senate, Democratic Senator Bob Kerrey announced that he would not run for re-election in 2000, which prompted other candidates to enter the race, including former Governor Ben Nelson. Moore announced on February 1, 2000, that he would join the Republican primary to succeed Kerrey.

Though Moore argued that he was the best candidate to take on Nelson in the general election, observers viewed him as an underdog against Attorney General Don Stenberg, who polled ahead of Moore and his other opponents and raised more money than them. Moore ultimately lost to Stenberg by a wide margin, winning 22 percent of the vote to Stenberg's 50 percent.

== Union Pacific ==
On November 9, 2000, Moore announced that he would resign from office to serve as the Director of Government Affairs for Union Pacific Railroad. Moore left office on December 18, 2000, after the certification of Nebraska's electors for the presidential election, and was succeeded by John A. Gale.

Moore retired from Union Pacific in 2023.
