= Doug Bereuter =

American politician (born 1939)

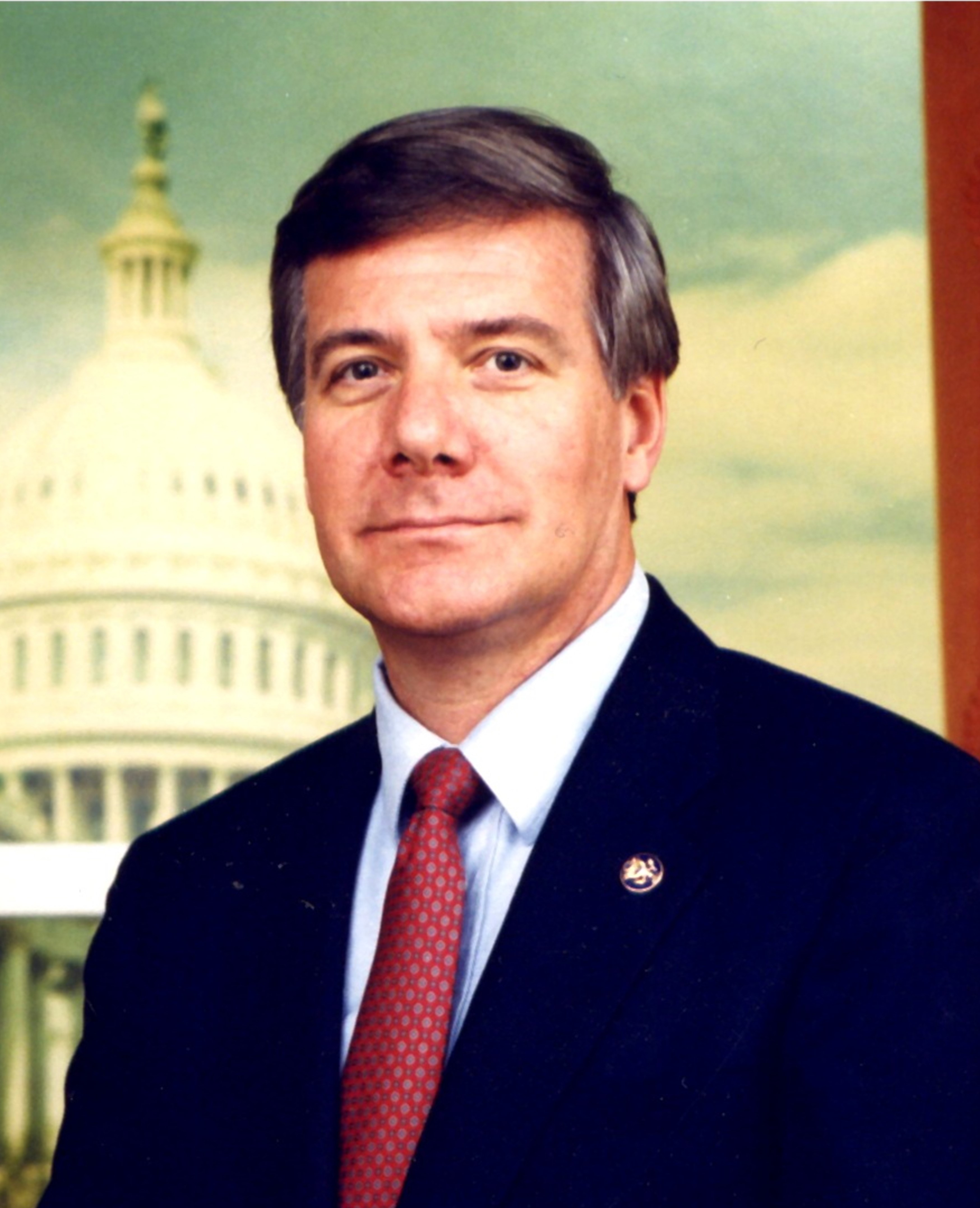
- Official portrait, 2000

Member of the U.S. House of Representatives from Nebraska's 1st district
- In office January 3, 1979 – August 31, 2004
- Preceded by: Charles Thone
- Succeeded by: Jeff Fortenberry

Member of the Nebraska Legislature from the 24th district
- In office January 8, 1975 – January 3, 1979
- Preceded by: Walter Epke
- Succeeded by: Harold Sieck

Personal details
- Born: October 6, 1939 (age 86) York, Nebraska, U.S.
- Party: Republican
- Spouse: Louise
- Children: 2
- Education: University of Nebraska (BA); Harvard University (MUP, MPA)
- Bereuter's voice Bereuter welcoming Peter Milliken to the U.S. Recorded May 2, 2002

Douglas Kent Bereuter (born October 6, 1939) is an American retired politician from the state of Nebraska in the Midwestern United States. He served as a Republican member of the United States House of Representatives from 1979 until 2004. He also served as the president and CEO of The Asia Foundation from 2004 to 2011 and is a member of the ReFormers Caucus at Issue One. Bereuter is a member of the Republican Party.

== Early life and education ==
Bereuter, a fifth generation Nebraskan, was born in York, Nebraska, and was reared in Utica, Nebraska, attended its Lutheran and public schools before graduating from Utica High School in 1957. He attended the University of Nebraska in Lincoln, where he was a member of Sigma Alpha Epsilon, with election to Phi Beta Kappa, and Sigma Xi, before graduating in 1961 with a B.A. and as a Distinguished Military Graduate. He attended the Harvard Graduate School of Design from 1961 to 1963, receiving its M.C.P. degree. From 1963 to 1965 he served as a counter-intelligence officer in the U.S. Army, with the 1st Infantry Division. After intervening public and private sector employment, from 1972 to 1973 he attended Harvard's Kennedy School of Government, receiving the M.P.A. degree.

== Career ==
Bereuter worked as an urban planner with the U.S. Department of Housing and Urban Development from 1965 to 1966. He was a division director for the Nebraska Department of Economic Development from 1967 to 1968, and from 1968 to 1970 he was director of the Nebraska Office of Planning & Programming and the State's Federal-State Relations Coordinator. After the 1970 election defeat of Nebraska's Republican governor, Norbert T. Tiemann, Bereuter worked as an independent city and regional planning consultant in the Great Plains and Rocky Mountain West and as a part-time associate professor in the graduate planning programs of both Kansas State University and the University of Nebraska. After his congressional service, Doug Bereuter was active in public service as a long term board member of the Arbor Day Foundation and the Nebraska Community Foundation, on supporting food security and agricultural development in Sub-Saharan Africa and South Asia with the Chicago Council on Global Affairs, where he is a Distinguished Fellow, and for seven years as a member of the State Department's International Security Advisory Board. He is a member of the Council on Foreign Affairs and the World Affairs Council of Northern California.

== Political career ==
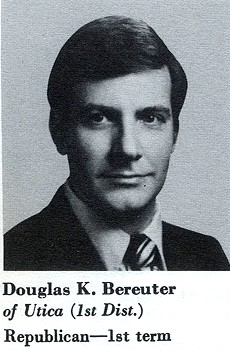
Douglas Bereuter's first term, 1979, Congressional Pictorial Directory

After defeating an incumbent state senator in his home district, Bereuter served in the Nebraska Legislature from 1975 to 1979. He was a member of the Nebraska Legislature's appropriations committee. As a Republican congressional candidate in the 1978 General Election, Bereuter received 58.13% of the vote and was elected to serve Nebraska's 1st Congressional District in the U.S. House of Representatives. He was subsequently re-elected 12 times, never winning less than 59% of the vote. His 26 years in the House was the longest for a Nebraska congressman, exceeded only by the combined House and Senate service of both George W. Norris and Carl Curtis. He announced that he would not seek re-election for a 14th term, and retired from the U.S. House of Representatives on August 31, 2004, to immediately become the president and CEO of The Asia Foundation, where he served until retirement at the beginning of 2011.

After his initial assignments on the House Interior & Insular Affairs Committee and the Small Business Committee, Bereuter served 22 years on both the House Foreign Affairs and Banking or Financial Services Committees. As a leading member of the Foreign Affairs Committee, he served as its vice chairman and as chairman of its Asia-Pacific and Europe Subcommittees. He also served on the Economic Policy & Trade and Human Rights Subcommittees of the Foreign Affairs Committee. On the Banking Committee, he served for 16 years as chairman or ranking minority member of its International Financial Institutions Subcommittee. Bereuter also served a total of nearly 10 years on the House Permanent Select Committee on Intelligence, retiring as its vice chairman. Additionally, Bereuter served his last three terms on the Transportation & Infrastructure Committee; and he served on the House Select Committee on Hunger for the entire period of its existence.

Some of Bereuter's additional congressional responsibilities included service as a congressional delegate to the United Nations' 42nd General Assembly, as the founding co-chairman of the Congressional-Executive Commission on China, and as Chairman of the Speaker's Task Force to Monitor and Report on the Transition Hong Kong (1996–2002). Additionally, he served on the U.S. Presidential Commission on Security and Economic Assistance (1983–1984) and on the U.S. Presidential Commission on Agricultural Trade and Export Policy (1985–1986). Bereuter also chaired the House delegation to the NATO Parliamentary Assembly for ten years, retiring after two years as its president. For his work on European and NATO expansion issues, he was the recipient of decorations from the governments of Bulgaria, Lithuania, and Romania. He also had leadership roles in parliamentary exchanges with the European Parliament, Japan, Korea, China, and the United Kingdom.

Among the bills that Bereuter authored was the Bunning-Bereuter-Blumenauer Flood Insurance Reform Act of 2004. He also was co-author of the Bereuter-Levin Amendment, which made possible the passage of the act granting Permanent Normal Trading Relations with China. He was also responsible for starting the USAID Farmer-to-Farmer technical assistance program, which has taken thousands of American volunteers abroad. At the end of his congressional service, that program was named for him, along with a Farmers Home Administration program he authored to provide a home loan guarantee program for residents of small communities.

Bereuter generally had a moderate voting record. His lifetime American Conservative Union rating was 63. His speech at a Nebraska Republican Party meeting in 1998 underscored his moderate political approach and drew national attention when he urged the party to adopt a big tent policy by welcoming membership to people of any religious background through its practices and policies. In 2004, Bereuter endorsed state Senator Curt Bromm, Speaker of the Nebraska Legislature, as his successor in the U.S. House of Representatives. From a field of seven Republican candidates in Nebraska's Primary Election, Senator Bromm came in second behind Jeff Fortenberry after the Club for Growth made a large, last minute campaign contribution to defeat him. Shortly before he left Congress, Bereuter released a statement calling the Iraq War, which he had previously supported, "a mistake," and strongly criticized a "massive failure" of pre-war intelligence.

U.S. House of Representatives
Preceded by Charles Thone	Member of the U.S. House of Representatives from Nebraska's 1st congressional district 1979–2004	Succeeded by Jeff Fortenberry
Diplomatic posts
Preceded by Rafael Estrella	President of the NATO Parliamentary Assembly; 2002–2004	Succeeded by Pierre Lellouche
U.S. order of precedence (ceremonial)
Preceded by Sam Farr as Former U.S. Representative	Order of precedence of the United States as Former U.S. Representative	Succeeded by Jack Kingston as Former U.S. Representative
