= Walter Epke =

American politician (1917–2006)

Member of the Nebraska Legislature from the 24th district
- In office January 5, 1971 – January 8, 1975
- Preceded by: Wayne Schreurs
- Succeeded by: Doug Bereuter

Personal details
- Born: March 21, 1917 Waco, Nebraska
- Died: September 8, 2006 (aged 89) San Francisco, California
- Party: Republican
- Spouse: Doris Grewell (m. 1948; died 2006)
- Children: 2 (Gretchen, Gregory)
- Occupation: Livestock auction market operator, cattle feeder

Military service
- Allegiance: United States
- Branch/service: United States Army
- Years of service: 1941–1945
- Awards: Philippine Liberation Medal

Walter Henry Epke (March 21, 1917 – September 8, 2006) was a Republican politician from Nebraska who served as a member of the Nebraska Legislature from the 24th district from 1971 to 1975.

== Early life ==
Epke was born in Waco, Nebraska, in 1917, and served in the U.S. Army during World War II. Epke raised livestock in York, and owned and operated the York Livestock Sales Company with Wilbur Epke, his twin brother.

== Nebraska Legislature ==
In 1954, Epke ran for the state legislature, challenging State Senator Herbert Diers for re-election in the 24th district, which included Seward and York counties. In the primary election, Diers placed first with 51 percent of the vote and Epke placed second with 29 percent, and both advanced to the general election. Diers ultimately defeated Epke, winning re-election 54–46 percent.

In 1970, Epke ran for the legislature again, challenging appointed State Senator Wayne Schreurs, who was seeking a full term in the 24th district. In the primary election, Epke placed first, winning 39 percent of the vote to Schreurs's 30 percent, and they advanced to the general election. Epke narrowly defeated Schreurs, winning 51–49 percent.

Epke ran for re-election in 1974, and was challenged for re-election by Doug Bereuter, a consultant, and Dorris Marxhausen, a member of the Seward City Planning Commission. In the primary election, Bereuter placed first, receiving 41 percent of the vote to Epke's 32 percent and Marxhausen's 26 percent. Bereuter ultimately defeated Epke, winning 55–45 percent.

== Death ==
Epke died on September 8, 2006.
