= 2018 Nebraska gubernatorial election =

- November 6, 2018
- Turnout: 57.95%
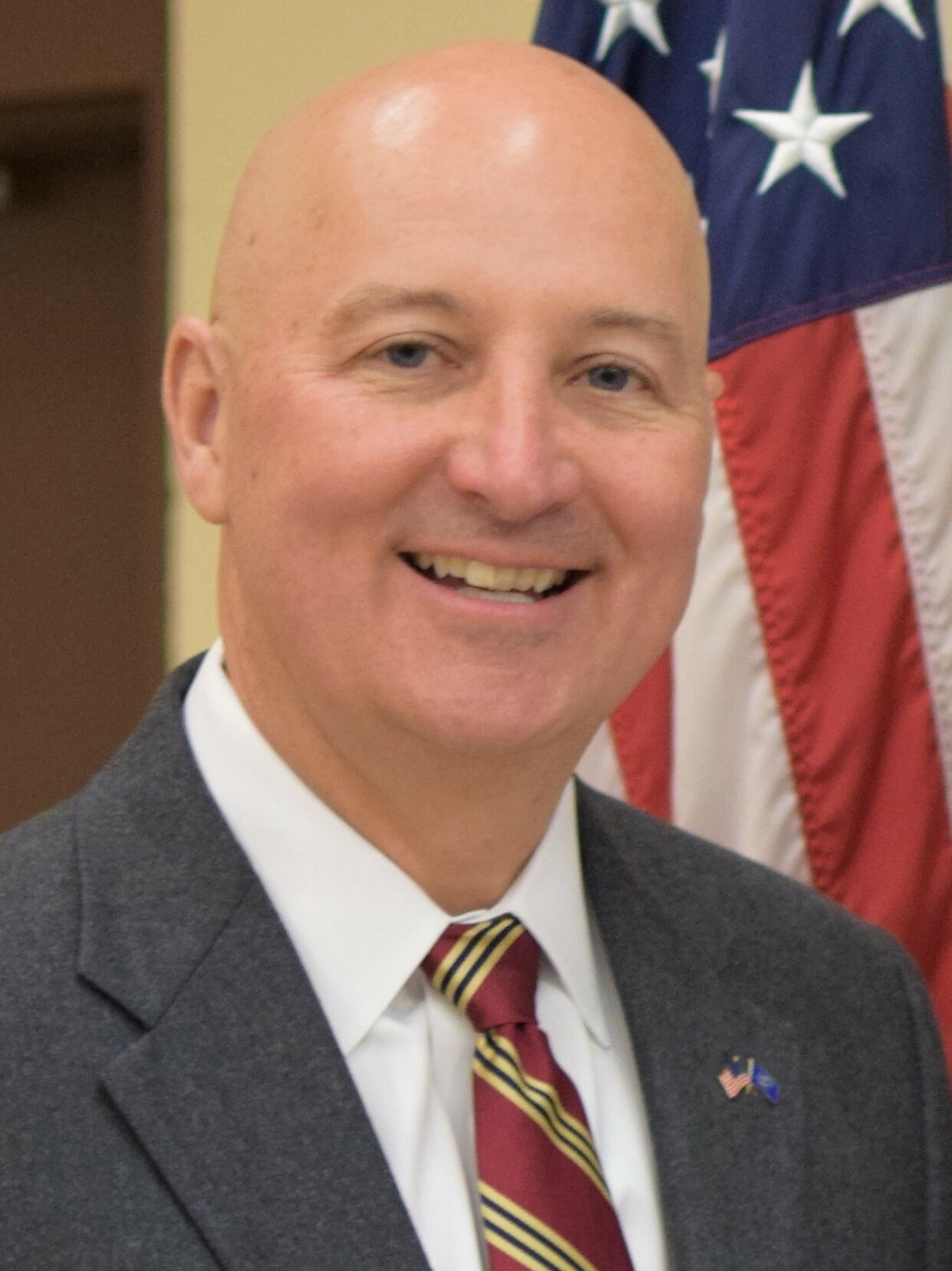

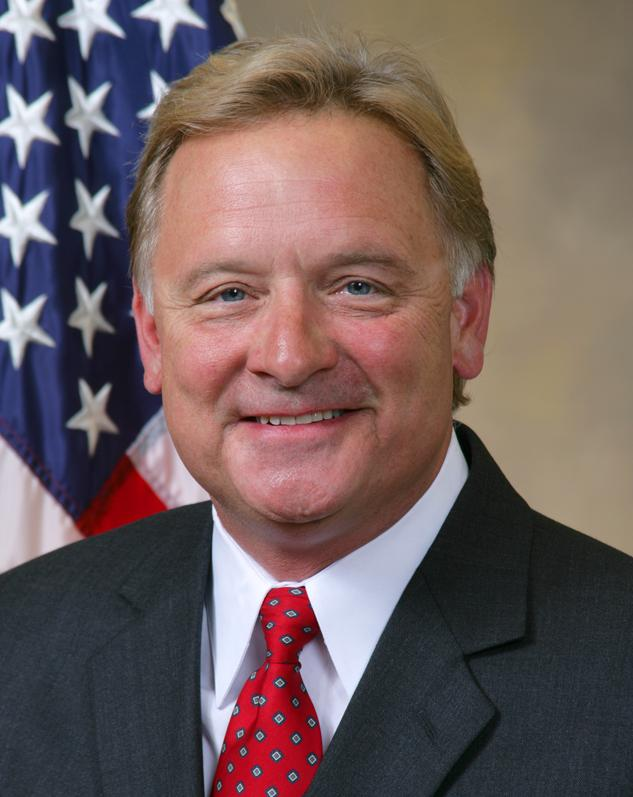
Nominee	Pete Ricketts	Bob Krist
Party	Republican	Democratic
Running mate	Mike Foley	Lynne Walz
Popular vote	411,812	286,169
Percentage	59.00%	41.00%
- Ricketts: 50–60% 60–70% 70–80% 80–90% >90% Krist: 50–60% 60–70% 70–80% 80–90% >90% Tie: 50% No votes
Governor before election
Pete Ricketts
Republican
Elected Governor
Pete Ricketts
Republican

The 2018 Nebraska gubernatorial election took place on November 6, 2018, to elect the governor of Nebraska. Republican incumbent Pete Ricketts won re-election to a second term, defeating Democratic state senator Bob Krist. Ricketts won by a slightly bigger margin than in 2014.

== Republican primary ==
=== Candidates ===
==== Declared ====
- Krystal Gabel, writer, candidate for Metropolitan Utilities District in 2016 and candidate for Omaha City Council in 2017
- Pete Ricketts, incumbent governor

- Running mate: Mike Foley, incumbent lieutenant governor

==== Declined ====
- Mike Flood, former speaker of the Nebraska Legislature
- Bob Krist, state senator (running as a Democrat)

=== Endorsements ===
Pete Ricketts

Organizations

- Nebraska Farm Bureau
- NRA Political Victory Fund

=== Results ===
Results by county: Ricketts—>90% Ricketts—80–90% Ricketts—70–80% Ricketts—60–70%

Republican primary results
Party	Candidate	Votes	%
Republican	Pete Ricketts (inc.)	138,292	81.42%
Republican	Krystal Gabel	31,568	18.58%
Total votes		169,860	100.00%

== Democratic primary ==
=== Candidates ===
==== Declared ====
- Tyler Davis, University of Nebraska, Omaha instructor
- Bob Krist, state senator

- Running mate: Lynne Walz, state senator

- Vanessa Gayle Ward, activist

==== Declined ====
- Chuck Hassebrook, former regent of the University of Nebraska and nominee for governor in 2014 (running for the legislature)
- Steve Lathrop, former state senator (running for the legislature)

=== Endorsements ===
Bob Krist

State legislators

- Burke Harr, Nebraska Legislature 8th District

Mayors

- Chris Beutler, Lincoln

Federal-level politicians

- Brad Ashford, former congressman

=== Results ===
Results by county: Krist—70–80% Krist—60–70% Krist—50–60% Krist—40–50% Krist—<40% Tie Ward—40–50% Ward—50–60%

Democratic primary results
Party	Candidate	Votes	%
Democratic	Bob Krist	54,992	59.81%
Democratic	Vanessa Gayle Ward	26,478	28.80%
Democratic	Tyler A. Davis	10,472	11.39%
Total votes		91,942	100.00%

== Independents ==
State Senator Bob Krist announced in September 2017 that he had left the Republican Party in order to mount a third party challenge against Governor Ricketts. Krist planned to create a new party in order to run, which would require submitting 5,000 signatures to qualify the party for the ballot. However, in February 2018, he abandoned his independent candidacy and became a Democrat.

=== Candidates ===
==== Withdrawn ====
- Bob Krist, state senator (running as a Democrat)

== General election ==
=== Predictions ===
Source	Ranking	As of
The Cook Political Report	Safe R	October 26, 2018
The Washington Post	Safe R	November 5, 2018
FiveThirtyEight	Safe R	November 5, 2018
Rothenberg Political Report	Safe R	November 1, 2018
Sabato's Crystal Ball	Safe R	November 5, 2018
RealClearPolitics	Safe R	November 4, 2018
Daily Kos	Safe R	November 5, 2018
Fox News (Note: The Fox News Midterm Power Rankings uniquely does not contain a category for Safe/Solid races)	Likely R	November 5, 2018
Politico	Safe R	November 5, 2018
Governing	Safe R	November 5, 2018

=== Debates ===
Host network/sponsors	Date	Link(s)	Participants	
Host network/sponsors	Date	Link(s)	Bob Krist (D)	Pete Ricketts (R)
KMTV-TV	August 30, 2018; 3:00 pm MDT		Invited	Invited

=== Results ===
2018 Nebraska gubernatorial election
Party	Candidate	Votes	%	±%
Republican	Pete Ricketts (inc.)	411,812	59.00%	+1.85%
Democratic	Bob Krist	286,169	41.00%	+1.77%
Majority		125,643	18.00%	+0.08%
Total votes		697,981	100.0%	
Republican hold				

==== By county ====
By county

County	Person Democratic		Person Republican		Various candidates Other parties		Margin		Total votes
County	#	%	#	%	#	%	#	%	Total votes
Adams County									
Antelope County									
Arthur County									
Banner County									
Blaine County									
Boone County									
Box Butte County									
Boyd County									
Brown County									
Buffalo County									
Burt County									
Butler County									
Cass County									
Cedar County									
Chase County									
Cherry County									
Cheyenne County									
Clay County									
Colfax County									
Cuming County									
Custer County									
Dakota County									
Dawes County									
Dawson County									
Deuel County									
Dixon County									
Dodge County									
Douglas County									
Dundy County									
Fillmore County									
Franklin County									
Frontier County									
Furnas County									
Gage County									
Garden County									
Garfield County									
Gosper County									
Grant County									
Greeley County									
Hall County									
Hamilton County									
Hayes County									
Hitchcock County									
Holt County									
Hooker County									
Howard County									
Jefferson County									
Johnson County									
Kearney County									
Keith County									
Keya Paha County									
Kimball County									
Knox County									
Lancaster County									
Lincoln County									
Logan County									
Loup County									
Madison County									
McPherson County									
Merrick County									
Morrill County									
Nance County									
Nance County									
Nemaha County									
Nuckolls County									
Otoe County									
Pawnee County									
Perkins County									
Phelps County									
Pierce County									
Platte County									
Polk County									
Red Willow County									
Richardson County									
Rock County									
Saline County									
Sarpy County									
Saunders County									
Scotts Bluff County									
Seward County									
Sheridan County									
Sioux County									
Stanton County									
Thayer County									
Stanton County									
Thurston County									
Valley County									
Washington County									
Wayne County									
Webster County									
Wheeler County									
York County									
Totals									

Counties that flipped from Democratic to Republican

- Burt (largest village: Tekamah)
- Saline (largest city: Crete)
- Thurston (largest village: Pender)

Counties that flipped from Republican to Democratic

- Douglas (largest city: Omaha)

==== By congressional district ====
Rickets won two of three congressional districts, with Krist winning the remaining one, which elected a Republican.

District	Ricketts	Krist	Representative
1st	56%	44%	Jeff Fortenberry
2nd	49%	51%	Don Bacon
3rd	74%	26%	Adrian Smith

== See also ==
- Nebraska elections, 2018
