= William Walker (Wyandot leader) =

American Wyandot leader (1800–1874)

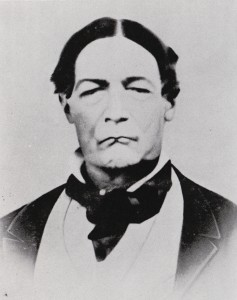

Governor of Nebraska
- Acting
- In office July 23, 1853 – October 16, 1854
- Preceded by: Position established
- Succeeded by: Francis Burt

Personal details
- Born: March 5, 1800 Wayne County, Michigan, U.S.
- Died: February 13, 1874 (aged 73) Kansas City, Missouri, U.S.
- Citizenship: American; Wyandot
- Party: Democratic

William Walker (March 5, 1800 – February 13, 1874) was a Wyandot Native American leader and the first provisional governor of Nebraska Territory which also encompassed the present-day state of Kansas.

== Background ==
Walker was born March 5, 1800, in Wayne County, Michigan Territory. He was the son of William Walker, Sr., a white man who was captured by Lenape Indians in 1777 in Russell County, Virginia. Walker, Sr. was later sold to the Wyandot and grew up among them. William, Sr. married Catherine Rankin, who was one-fourth Wyandot. The couple had ten children.

Walker was educated in a Methodist school in Worthington, Ohio, and spoke English, French, Wyandot, Lenape, Shawnee, Miami, and Potawatomi; and read Latin and Greek. He was described as an eloquent speaker and forceful writer on political and literary subjects. He married Hannah Barrett (d. Dec 7, 1863) on April 8, 1824. She was a student in a Christian mission school at Upper Sandusky, Ohio, and was probably partly Native American. She served as private secretary to Lewis Cass, the governor of Michigan Territory. He became chief of the Wyandot in 1835. After the death of his first wife, Walker married Evelina J. Barrett, a widowed sister-in-law of his first wife, in 1865. She died on August 28, 1868.

== The move to Kansas ==
Despite their adaption to American mores, political pressure increased on the Wyandot in the 1830s to exchange their lands in Ohio for land in what would become the state of Kansas. In 1832, Walker headed a delegation of five Wyandot to explore their proposed new lands. The report of the Wyandot, written by Walker, was highly unfavorable toward the land they saw and the white people they encountered on the frontier, an "abandoned, dissolute, and wicked class of people," many of whom were "fugitives from justice." The murder of a Wyandot chief and his family finally persuaded the Wyandot that the American government would not protect them in Ohio and, in 1843, 664 Wyandot left Ohio by steamboat for their new home in Kansas. Their new lands, purchased from the Lenape, another Indian tribe in Kansas, encompassed the present Kansas City, Kansas.

Kansas historian William E. Connelley described the Wyandot. "When the Wyandots came to Kansas no member of the tribe was more than one-fourth Indian. The tribe was Indian; the people three-fourths white. They brought with them their church, their schools, their Masonic lodge, a code of laws for their government. They set up their institutions here. They enforced the law."

== Provisional governor of Nebraska Territory ==
On July 26, 1853, Walker was elected provisional governor of the territory of Nebraska at a meeting at the Wyandot Council house. The group that elected him consisted of Wyandot, white traders, and others with outside interests who wished to preempt the federal government's organization of the territory and benefit from the settlement of Kansas by white settlers. Walker and the others were also promoting Kansas as the route for the proposed transcontinental railroad.

Walker's election as provisional governor was not accepted by the federal government, but it prompted Congress to hasten the official organization of the future states of Kansas and Nebraska by passing the Kansas–Nebraska Act 1854. This opened the territory to white settlement and allowed settlers to determine if slavery would be allowed in their territories. The Wyandot people were divided on the issue of slavery, although some, Walker included, owned slaves. Walker, however, opposed secession. A few Wyandot benefited in the 1850s and 1860s by selling their lands to white settlers, but for most the influx of Whites proved disastrous and they soon moved to Oklahoma and new lands there. Walker, however, remained in Kansas where he died on February 13, 1874.

== Walker's legacy ==
Walker's political efforts had the objective of preventing the Wyandot from being dispossessed of their lands in Kansas as they had been in Ohio. As a member of the Wyandot elite, he believed that the Wyandot could survive and prosper alongside white settlers. He was wrong, although some of the Wyandot, including himself, continued to be respected and to be known as important citizens of the territory and state of Kansas.

Political offices
New office	Governor of Nebraska; Acting; 1853–1854	Succeeded by Francis Burt
