= Thomas B. Cuming =

American politician

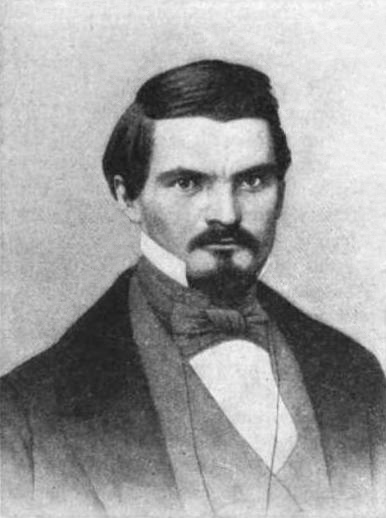

Acting Governor of Nebraska Territory
- In office October 18, 1854 – February 23, 1855
- Appointed by: Franklin Pierce
- Preceded by: Francis Burt as Territorial Governor
- Succeeded by: Mark W. Izard as Territorial Governor
- In office October 25, 1857 – January 12, 1858
- Appointed by: James Buchanan
- Preceded by: Mark W. Izard as Territorial Governor
- Succeeded by: William Alexander Richardson as Territorial Governor

Personal details
- Born: Thomas Barney Cuming; December 25, 1827 Genesee County, New York, U.S.
- Died: March 12, 1858 (aged 30) Omaha, Nebraska Territory
- Party: Democratic
- Spouse: Margaret C. Murphy
- Education: University of Michigan

Thomas Barney Cuming (December 25, 1827 – March 12, 1858) was an American military officer and politician. He served as the first Secretary of Nebraska Territory and served twice as the territory's Acting Governor, the first time following the death of Francis Burt and the second following the resignation of Mark W. Izard.

== Background ==
Cuming was born in Genesee County, New York on December 25, 1827. The son of an Episcopal minister, his mother died when he was a young child. Following his mother's death, he was raised by his uncle, a Prebysterian residing in Rochester, New York. Cuming was admitted to The University of Michigan, Ann Arbor, at an early age and graduated at the age of sixteen. Following his graduation, he worked as a geologist in a scientific expedition exploring the Lake Superior region for minerals.

In November 1847, during the Mexican-American War, Cuming enlisted as a sergeant with the 1st Michigan Infantry Regiment. His assigned duties kept him away from battle for the duration of the hostilities. Following the war, he became a telegraph operator in Keokuk, Iowa. Looking to advance himself, he began writing articles for the Keokuk Dispatch. The reaction to these articles was extremely favorable, and Cuming was made editor of the newspaper. During his time in Keokuk, he also married Margaret C. Murphy.

== Nebraska ==
Cuming was appointed Secretary of the newly formed Nebraska Territory at the age of 25 and arrived to assume his duties on October 8, 1854. Just ten days later, with the sudden death of Governor Francis Burt, Cuming became the Acting Governor.

Among his first duties as Acting Governor, Cuming ordered a census of the territory and preparations for the territory's first legislative session. Despite Governor Burt's intention to establish the capital in Bellevue, Cuming chose to locate it in Omaha. The choice of a location north of the Platte River, while beneficial to Cuming's political allies in Council Bluffs, Iowa, angered many of the territory's 2,732 residents, 1,818 of whom lived south of the river. The Acting Governor further complicated the situation by allocating a majority of the legislative representation to counties north of the river. As a result, when the legislature convened on January 16, 1855, it dedicated most of its energies to examining Cuming's role in making Omaha the territorial capital.

He was accused of successfully using fraud and bribery to designate Omaha the territorial capital. The Nebraska Palladium reported in 1855: "Men have been bought—four thousand dollars was offered to John M. Singleton, of Richardson County, if he would vote for the Capitol being located at Omaha City; and it was offered [to] him by the Private Secretary of Acting Governor Cuming."

With the arrival of Governor Mark W. Izard, Cuming resumed his role as Territorial Secretary. The political split between north and south continued however, with a short lived effort to have southern Nebraska annexed into Kansas taking place. Following the resignation of Governor Izard, Cuming again became Acting Governor until the arrival of Governor William Alexander Richardson.

Cuming died on March 12, 1858, at the age of 30. Cuming County, Nebraska, and Cuming Street, a main street of Omaha, was named after him.

Preceded by Francis Burt; Territorial Governor	Acting Governor of Nebraska Territory; October 18, 1854 – 1855	Succeeded by Mark W. Izard; Territorial Governor
Preceded by Mark W. Izard; Territorial Governor	Acting Governor of Nebraska Territory; 1857 – March 23, 1858	Succeeded by William A. Richardson; Territorial Governor
