= Wayne Schreurs =

American politician (1928–2020)

Member of the Nebraska Legislature from the 24th district
- In office January 24, 1969 – January 5, 1971
- Preceded by: Stanley Matzke
- Succeeded by: Walter Epke

Personal details
- Born: August 17, 1928 Lincoln, Nebraska
- Died: November 1, 2020 (aged 92) Lincoln, Nebraska
- Spouse: Catha Nora Rhoads (m. 1948)
- Children: 3 (Greg, Les, Ann)
- Education: Evangelical Theological Seminary; Westmar College; Concordia Teachers College
- Occupation: Teacher, minister

Wayne Leroy Schreurs (August 17, 1928 – November 1, 2020) was an American politician from Nebraska who served as a member of the Nebraska Legislature from the 24th district from 1969 to 1971.

== Early life ==
Schreurs was born in Lincoln, Nebraska, in 1928, and graduated from Lincoln High School. He graduated from Westmar College and the Evangelical Theological Seminary, and attended Concordia Teachers College. Schreurs was a minister in the Evangelical United Brethren Church, and was at churches in Geneva, Norfolk, and Seward. He began teaching at Seward High School in 1966, and taught courses in government and psychology.

== Nebraska Legislature ==
On January 19, 1969, State Senator Stanley Matzke, who represented the 24th district, died, and Governor Norbert Tiemann appointed Schreurs to serve out the remaining two years of Matzke's term.

Schreurs ran for a full term in 1970. He was challenged by businessman Walter Epke; Ted Otto, the former state director of the National Farmers Union; and York County Commissioner Manford Ekart. Schreurs placed second in the primary election, winning 30 percent of the vote to Epke's 39 percent. Epke and Schreurs advanced to the general election, where Epke narrowly defeated Schreurs, winning 51 percent of the vote to Schreurs's 49 percent.

== Death ==
Schreurs died on November 1, 2020.
