= John A. Gale =

American politician (born 1940)

John Gale

26th Secretary of State of Nebraska
- In office December 2000 – January 10, 2019
- Governor: Mike Johanns; Dave Heineman; Pete Ricketts
- Preceded by: Scott Moore
- Succeeded by: Bob Evnen

Personal details
- Born: October 23, 1940 (age 86) Omaha, Nebraska, U.S.
- Party: Republican
- Education: Carleton College (BA); University of Chicago (JD)

John A. Gale (born October 23, 1940) is from North Platte, Nebraska, and served as the 26th Secretary of State of Nebraska from 2000 until 2019. He is a member of the Republican Party.

== Early life ==
John A. Gale was born in Omaha, Nebraska, and graduated from Omaha North High School. He earned his B.A. in Government and International Relations at Carleton College in Northfield, Minnesota in 1962. In 1965, Gale graduated with a J.D. from the University of Chicago Law School.

== Professional background ==
After law school, Gale held legal positions in the private and public sectors. He worked in the legal department at Northern Natural Gas Company in Omaha. From 1968 to 1970, he served as a legislative assistant to U.S. senator Roman Hruska of Nebraska and was responsible for agricultural appropriations, foreign relations, and constitutional law issues. In 1970, he returned to Nebraska to work as an Assistant U.S. Attorney, first in Omaha and then in Lincoln.

Gale and his family moved to North Platte, Nebraska, in 1971, where he entered the private practice of law. He practiced law there for 29 years.

He is a former chairman of the Nebraska Republican Party, former chairman of the Mental Health Board for Lincoln County, former president of the 11th Judicial District Bar Association, former chairman for the North Platte Chamber of Commerce Government Affairs Committee, and former president for the North Platte Sunrise Rotary Club.

Gale ran unsuccessfully for the U.S. House of Representatives in 2000. He was defeated by former U.S. representative Tom Osborne for the Republican nomination.

== Secretary of State ==
Gale was appointed to fill a vacancy at Secretary of State in December 2000 by Governor Mike Johanns. He was elected Secretary of State in 2002, defeating his Democratic Party opponent, Jay Stoddard. He was reelected in 2006, defeating Stoddard again. In 2010, Gale won re-election against Democratic Party opponent Janet Stewart. In 2014, Gale won re-election against Libertarian Party opponent Ben Backus.

As Secretary of State, Gale implemented major election improvements in Nebraska to meet the requirements of the federal Help America Vote Act. Under his leadership, all Nebraska counties received new ballot tabulation equipment and switched to a computerized statewide voter registration system. He promoted efforts to increase voter participation. Nebraska set new turnout records in both the 2004 and 2008 presidential elections.

At his request, he was designated chief protocol officer for international relations by the Legislature. In that role, he promoted commerce, educational studies and cultural exchange between foreign nations and Nebraska. Gale was instrumental in getting the Legislature to overhaul and modernize state law dealing with notaries public. As secretary of state and chairman of the state Records Board, he pushed for increased and improved online access to state government. He championed efforts to provide civics education to the state’s youth, with the goal to encourage youth to become active citizens and lifelong voters.

Gale was a national leader on election reform and was active in the National Association of Secretaries of State. He served on the Executive Committee for NASS, including as a past chairman of its Business Services and International Relations committees. He is a current member of the U.S. Standards Board for the U.S. Election Assistance Commission and served in the past on the Technical Guidelines Development Committee for the U.S. Election Assistance Commission.

As Secretary of State, Gale was the chairman of the Nebraska Real Estate Commission, and served on the Nebraska State Records Board, Nebraska Collection Agency Licensing Board, Nebraska Accountability and Disclosure Commission, the Nebraska Canvassing Board, and the Nebraska Pardons Board. He is a board member for Cornhusker Boys State and the NebraskaLAND Foundation.

== Family ==
Gale's family includes his wife, Carol; sons David of North Platte, Nebraska, and Steven of Laramie, Wyoming; daughter Elaine of Los Angeles, California; and six grandsons.

== Electoral history ==
Nebraska secretary of state election, 2014
Party	Candidate	Votes	%
Republican	John A. Gale (incumbent)	368,135	75.19
Libertarian	Ben Backus	121,470	24.81
Total votes		489,605	100.0
Republican hold			

Nebraska secretary of state election, 2010
Party	Candidate	Votes	%
Republican	John A. Gale (incumbent)	326,431	69.75
Democratic	Janet Stewart	141,564	30.25
Total votes		467,995	100.0
Republican hold			

Nebraska secretary of state election, 2006
Party	Candidate	Votes	%
Republican	John A. Gale (incumbent)	337,189	61.32
Democratic	Jay Stoddard	184,684	33.60
Green	Doug Paterson	27,987	5.09
Total votes		549,860	100.0
Republican hold			

Nebraska secretary of state election, 2002
Party	Candidate	Votes	%
Republican	John A. Gale (incumbent)	274,268	62.06
Democratic	Jay Stoddard	131,408	29.73
Nebraska	Joseph Rosberg	27,579	6.24
Libertarian	Tudor Lewis	8,679	1.96
Total votes		441,934	100.0
Republican hold			

Nebraska 3rd congressional district Republican primary election, 2000
Party	Candidate	Votes	%
Republican	Tom Osborne	52,438	70.72
Republican	John A. Gale	12,553	16.93
Republican	Kathy Wilmot	9,127	12.31
Republican	Write-ins	26	0.04
Total votes		74,144	100.0

Party political offices
Preceded by Scott Moore	Republican nominee for Secretary of State of Nebraska; 2002, 2006, 2010, 2014	Succeeded by Bob Evnen
Political offices
Preceded by Scott Moore	Secretary of State of Nebraska; 2000–2019	Succeeded by Bob Evnen
