= Pleasant Dale, Nebraska =

Village in Seward County, Nebraska, United States

- Village
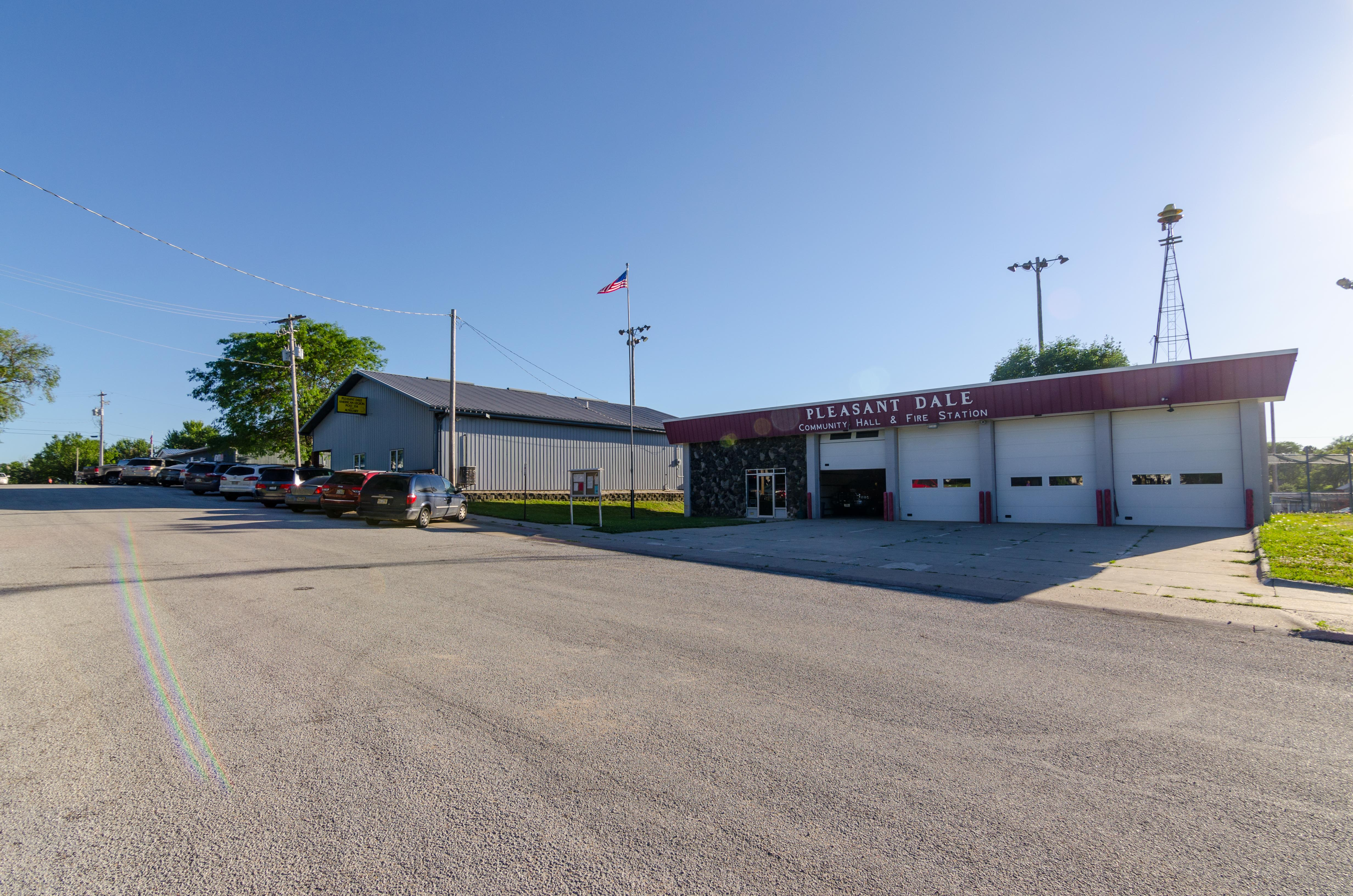
- Pleasant Dale Fire Station, June 2017

- Location of Pleasant Dale, Nebraska
- Coordinates: 40°47′28″N 96°55′59″W
- Country: United States
- State: Nebraska
- County: Seward

Area
  - Total: 0.11 sq mi (0.29 km^{2})
  - Land: 0.11 sq mi (0.29 km^{2})
  - Water: 0 sq mi (0.00 km^{2})
- Elevation: 1,322 ft (403 m)

Population (2020)
  - Total: 218
  - Density: 1,937.2/sq mi (747.95/km^{2})
- Time zone: UTC-6 (Central (CST))
  - Summer (DST): UTC-5 (CDT)
- ZIP code: 68423
- Area code: 402
- FIPS code: 31-39380
- GNIS feature ID: 2399690
- Website: pdale-ne.us

Pleasant Dale is a village in Seward County, Nebraska, United States. It is part of the Lincoln, Nebraska Metropolitan Statistical Area. The population was 218 at the 2020 census.

== History ==
Pleasant Dale was laid out in 1883. It was named from its scenic setting in the Middle Creek valley.

== Geography ==
According to the United States Census Bureau, the village has a total area of 0.11 square miles (0.28 km^{2}), all land.

== Demographics ==
Historical population
Census	Pop.	Note	%±
1910	257		—
1920	221		−14.0%
1930	138		−37.6%
1940	140		1.4%
1950	163		16.4%
1960	190		16.6%
1970	258		35.8%
1980	259		0.4%
1990	253		−2.3%
2000	245		−3.2%
2010	205		−16.3%
2020	218		6.3%
U.S. Decennial Census

=== 2010 census ===
As of the census of 2010, there were 205 people, 92 households, and 63 families residing in the village. The population density was 1,863.6 inhabitants per square mile (719.5/km^{2}). There were 105 housing units at an average density of 954.5 per square mile (368.5/km^{2}). The racial makeup of the village was 93.2% White, 0.5% Asian, 0.5% from other races, and 5.9% from two or more races. Hispanic or Latino of any race were 1.0% of the population.

There were 92 households, of which 23.9% had children under the age of 18 living with them, 55.4% were married couples living together, 9.8% had a female householder with no husband present, 3.3% had a male householder with no wife present, and 31.5% were non-families. 30.4% of all households were made up of individuals, and 14.2% had someone living alone who was 65 years of age or older. The average household size was 2.23 and the average family size was 2.76.

The median age in the village was 41.3 years. 22% of residents were under the age of 18; 6.8% were between the ages of 18 and 24; 24.4% were from 25 to 44; 28.2% were from 45 to 64; and 18.5% were 65 years of age or older. The gender makeup of the village was 50.2% male and 49.8% female.

=== 2000 census ===
As of the census of 2000, there were 245 people, 105 households, and 72 families residing in the village. The population density was 2,830.4 inhabitants per square mile (1,092.8/km^{2}). There were 111 housing units at an average density of 1,282.4 per square mile (495.1/km^{2}). The racial makeup of the village was 97.96% White, 1.22% Native American, and 0.82% from two or more races. Hispanic or Latino of any race were 0.82% of the population.

There were 105 households, out of which 27.6% had children under the age of 18 living with them, 61.9% were married couples living together, 3.8% had a female householder with no husband present, and 30.5% were non-families. 20.0% of all households were made up of individuals, and 7.6% had someone living alone who was 65 years of age or older. The average household size was 2.33 and the average family size was 2.73.

In the village, the population was spread out, with 18.8% under the age of 18, 9.4% from 18 to 24, 29.8% from 25 to 44, 29.0% from 45 to 64, and 13.1% who were 65 years of age or older. The median age was 38 years. For every 100 females, there were 107.6 males. For every 100 females age 18 and over, there were 107.3 males.

As of 2000 the median income for a household in the village was $43,438, and the median income for a family was $48,958. Males had a median income of $27,500 versus $26,250 for females. The per capita income for the village was $20,190. About 4.1% of families and 4.5% of the population were below the poverty line, including 13.2% of those under the age of eighteen and none of those 65 or over.

== See also ==
- List of municipalities in Nebraska
