= Francis Burt (American politician) =

American politician (1807–1854)

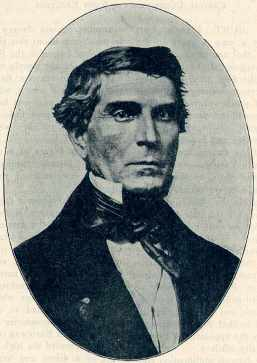

1st Governor of Nebraska Territory
- In office October 16, 1854 – October 18, 1854
- Appointed by: Franklin Pierce
- Preceded by: William Walker (Acting)
- Succeeded by: Thomas B. Cuming (Acting)

Personal details
- Born: January 13, 1807 Pendleton, South Carolina
- Died: October 18, 1854 (aged 47) Bellevue, Nebraska Territory
- Party: Democratic
- Spouse: Georgianna Hall

Francis Burt (January 13, 1807 – October 18, 1854) was an American politician from South Carolina who served as the first Governor of Nebraska Territory.

== Background ==
Burt was born on January 13, 1807, to Francis and Katherine (Miles) Burt in Pendleton, South Carolina. The fifth of ten children, he attended Pendleton Academy but did not graduate. After completing his formal education, Burt read law under Warren R. Davis before establishing his own legal practice. In 1831, he married Georgianna Hall of Charleston. The marriage produced three boys and five girls: Frank, Armistead, George Ann, Harriett Giraud, Joanna Lois, Mary Eliza, Katherine, and George Abbott.

Burt entered politics as a member of South Carolina's Nullification Convention, being one of the 136 delegates voting in support of the Ordinance of Nullification. In addition to the convention, 1832 saw Burt elected to the South Carolina General Assembly. He remained in the state legislature until 1844 when he was elected State Treasurer. Burt left office after a single term and served as editor of the Pendleton Messenger from 1847 till 1851. In 1852 he was a member of the South Carolina Constitutional Convention.

== Nebraska ==
Due to his active participation in the Democratic Party, President Franklin Pierce appointed Burt Third Auditor of the United States Treasury Department in 1853. The next year Pierce needed to select a governor for the newly created Nebraska Territory. After William Orlando Butler declined the position, the President selected Burt. The new governor was commissioned on August 2, 1854, and left his home in Pendleton for Nebraska on September 11.

Burt's son Armistead and several of his neighbors accompanied him of the four-week trip to the new territory. The new governor had suffered from digestive problems for several years and experienced an intensification of symptoms while en route. His medical condition was such that he spent several days in St. Louis, Missouri under care of a physician. Upon his October 7 arrival in Bellevue, Burt had experienced a relapse and was immediately confined to a sick bed in the local Presbyterian mission to the Oto and Omaha.

Judge Fenner Ferguson administered the oath of office to Burt on October 16, 1854. Two days later, on October 18, 1854, the governor died. Following the death of Governor Burt, Territorial Secretary Thomas B. Cuming became acting governor until the arrival of Governor Mark W. Izard.

Burt's body was returned to Pendleton, South Carolina for burial. In January 1855, the Nebraska Territorial Legislature named Burt County, Nebraska in honor of the deceased governor.

== Notes ==
Preceded by William Walker; Acting	Governor of Nebraska Territory; October 16, 1854 – October 18, 1854	Succeeded by Thomas B. Cuming; Acting
