= Mark W. Izard =

American politician

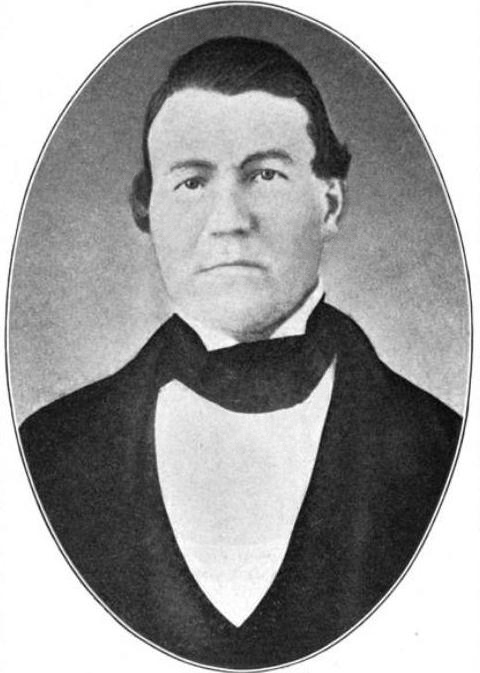

2nd Governor of Nebraska Territory
- In office February 20, 1855 – October 25, 1857
- Nominated by: Franklin Pierce
- Preceded by: Francis Burt; Thomas B. Cuming (acting)
- Succeeded by: Thomas B. Cuming (acting); William Richardson

Personal details
- Born: Mark Whitaker Izard; December 25, 1799 Lexington, Kentucky, U.S.
- Died: August 4, 1866 (aged 66) Forrest City, Arkansas, U.S.
- Party: Democratic

Mark Whitaker Izard (December 25, 1799 – August 4, 1866) was an Arkansas Democratic politician who served as the 2nd Governor of the Nebraska Territory. He also served in the Arkansas Senate.

Izard was born in Lexington, Kentucky to Nicholas H and Rebecca (Whitaker) Izard on December 25, 1799. His family were among the early settlers of the Huntsville, Alabama area and he was educated there in public schools. Izard married the daughter of George Shackleford of Charleston, South Carolina in 1823. The next year he moved his family to frontier town of Mount Vernon, Arkansas. Over the next several years he acquired an appreciable amount of land and slaves.

Mark Izard served in the Arkansas Territorial Council and as a delegate to the Arkansas Constitutional Convention of 1836. He was a member of both the Arkansas State Senate 1836, 1838–1840, and 1850–1853; he served as President of the Arkansas Senate. Izard also served in the Arkansas House of Representatives and served as its speaker. He became the governor of the Nebraska Territory in 1855 to 1857. He died in 1866 and is buried in Forrest City, Arkansas.

Preceded by Thomas B. Cuming; Acting Territorial Governor	Governor of Nebraska Territory; February 23, 1855 – October 25, 1857	Succeeded by Thomas B. Cuming; Acting Territorial Governor
