= Nebraska Republican Party =

Nebraska affiliate of the Republican Party

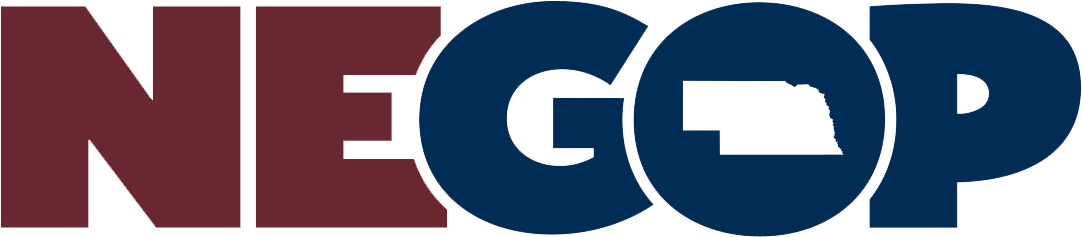
- Chairperson: Mary Jane Truemper
- Governor: Jim Pillen
- Lt. Governor: Joe Kelly
- Senate leader (Lt. Governor): Joe Kelly
- Speaker of the Legislature: John Arch
- Headquarters: 1610 N Street; Lincoln, NE 68508
- Membership (2024): ▲623,229
- Ideology: Conservatism
- National affiliation: Republican Party
- Colors: Ruby Red
- Seats in the U.S. Senate: 2 / 2
- Seats in the U.S. House: 3 / 3
- Statewide executive offices: 6 / 6
- Nebraska Supreme Court seats: 6 / 6
- Seats in the Nebraska Legislature (officially nonpartisan): 33 / 49
- Nebraska State Board of Education seats (officially nonpartisan): 4 / 8

Election symbol

Website
- www.ne.gop

The Nebraska Republican Party (NEGOP) is the affiliate of the Republican Party in Nebraska. The party is led by chair Mary Jane Truemper. Its headquarters is located in Lincoln. It is currently the dominant party in the state, controlling all of Nebraska's three U.S. House seats, both U.S. Senate seats, the state legislature, and the governorship.

== Party history ==
After 1860, Republicans dominated state elections in Nebraska for 30 years. The state has been strongly Republican during presidential elections.

As a result of a referendum in 1934, Nebraska has the United States' only unicameral legislature, known as the Nebraska Unicameral. All representatives are officially nonpartisan. Despite this, Republicans have held a majority in the state legislature for several decades.

== Political campaigns ==
In December 2009, the party organized a nationwide effort to unseat Democratic Senator Ben Nelson in 2012 under the theme "Give Ben The Boot".

For the 2024 United States elections, the state party made the unorthodox decision to support none of Nebraska's five incumbents throughout the primary season. The party endorsed opponents to Don Bacon, Adrian Smith and Pete Ricketts and did not endorse Deb Fischer nor Mike Flood in their races. All incumbents prevailed by large margins in their primary races; the closest was Bacon with a 24-point difference.

== Current elected officials ==
The Nebraska Republican Party currently controls all six statewide offices, both of the state's U.S. Senate seats, and all of the state's U.S. House seats.

=== Members of Congress ===
==== U.S. Senate ====
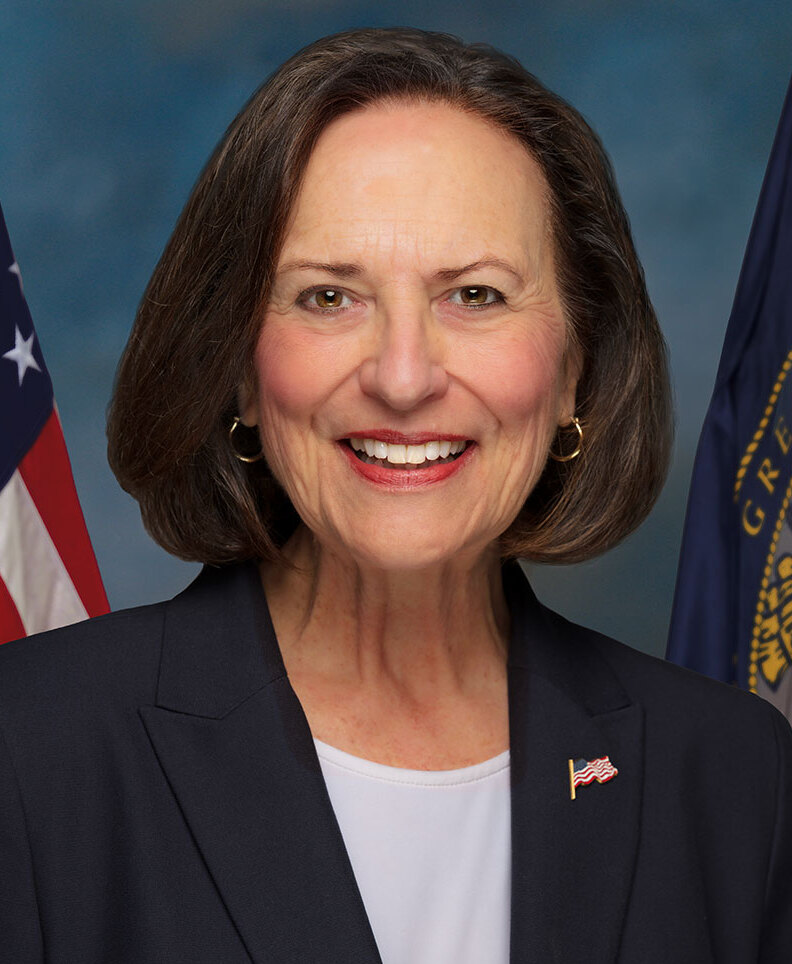
Senior U.S. Senator Deb Fischer

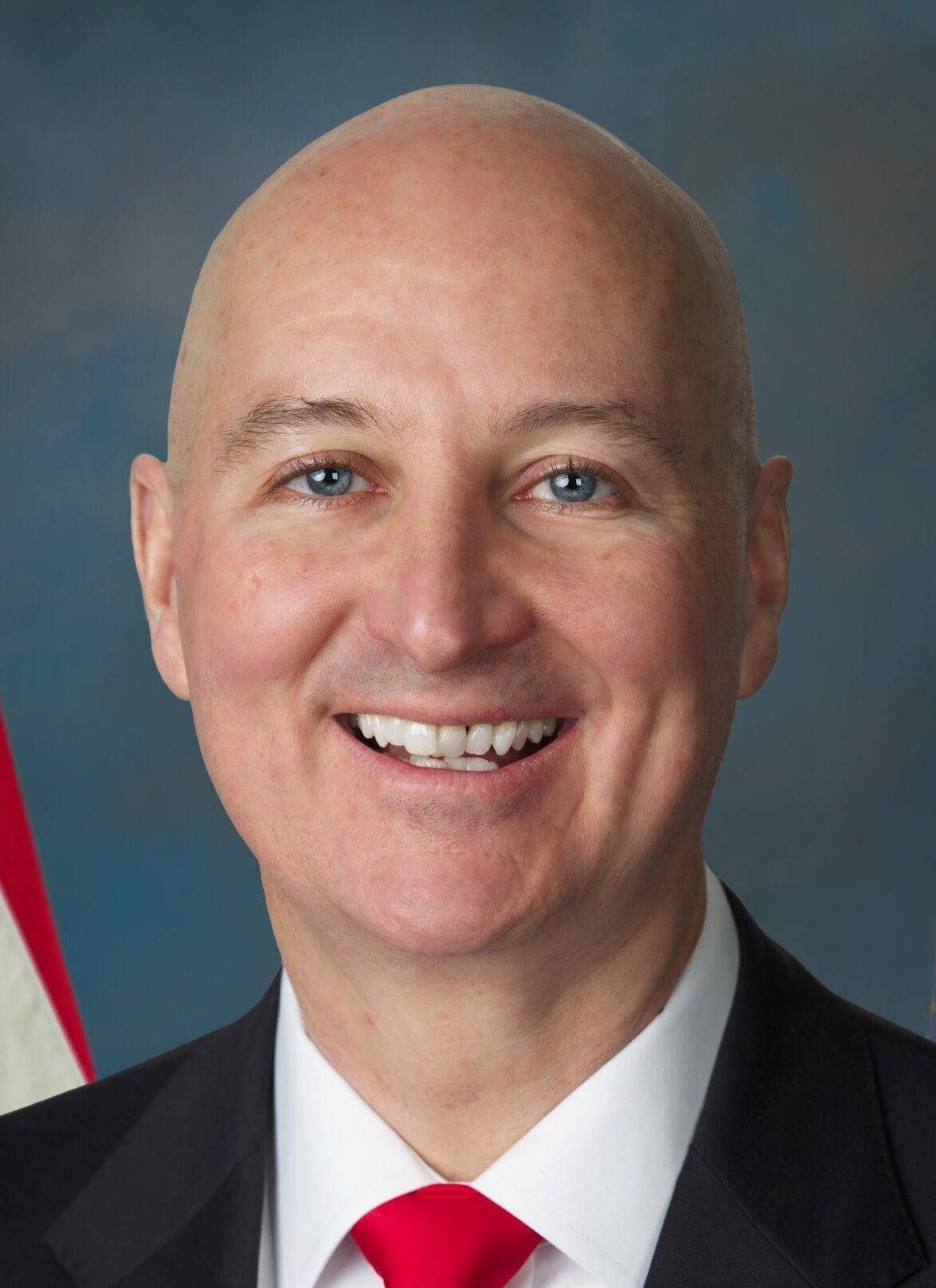
Junior U.S. Senator Pete Ricketts

==== U.S. House of Representatives ====
District	Member	Photo
1st	Mike Flood	
2nd	Don Bacon	
3rd	Adrian Smith	

=== Statewide offices ===
- Governor: Jim Pillen
- Lieutenant Governor: Joe Kelly
- Secretary of State: Bob Evnen
- Attorney General: Mike Hilgers
- Treasurer: John Murante
- Auditor: Mike Foley

=== Statewide Supreme Court justices ===
- Jeffrey J. Funke, Chief Justice
- Stephanie F. Stacy, District 1
- Derek Vaughn, District 2
- William B. Cassel, District 3
- Jonathan Papik, District 4
- Jason Bergevin, District 5
- John Freudenberg, District 6

== Executive officers ==
The Nebraska Republican Party has 34 executive officers. They are each a part of the executive committee where they approve business policies, general affairs, the annual budget, legislative plan, and the political plan of the state party. There are 30 members that have voting power, and 4 members that are considered ex-officio who do not have voting power.

Executive officers
Officer Role	Officeholder
State Chairman	Mary Jane Truemper
National Committeeman	William Feely
National Committeewoman	Fanchon Blythe
Treasurer	Dave Plond
Vice Chairman	Colton Schaardt
Assistant State Chairman I	Rick Benson
Assistant State Chairman II	Jon Tucker
Assistant State Chairman III	Sue Greenwald
Assistant State Chairman At Large	Craig Sefranek
Secretary	Pam Swenson
Finance Chairman	Ty Betka
General Counsel	Perry Pirsch
CD1 Chairman	Loreen Reynante
CD1 Vice-chairman	Stacy Rulla-Parroquin
CD1 Member-at-large	Jeanne Griesen
CD2 Chairman	Susie Bliss
CD2 Vice-chairman	Scott Petersen
CD2 Member-at-large	Dave Brodahl
CD3 Chairman	Christine Vail
CD3 Vice-chairman	Morissa Benson
CD3 Member-at-large	John McHargue
CD1 County Chairman Representative I (from Lancaster County)	Jack Riggins
CD1 County Chairman Representative II	Michael Tiedeman
CD2 County Chairman Representative I	John Schnell
CD2 County Chairman Representative II	Nancy Hicks
CD3 County Chairman Representative I	Vacant
CD3 County Chairman Representative II	Michael Schoop
CD3 County Chairman Representative III	Diana Johnson
CD3 County Chairman Representative IV	Cammie Matheny
State Federation of Republican Women President (ex-officio)	Deb Ecklund
State Young Republican Chairman (ex-officio)	Michael Ferguson
State College Republicans of America Chairman (ex-officio)	Nick Stefanik
State High School Republican Chairman (ex-officio)	Vacant
Immediate Past State Chairman	Eric Underwood

== Electoral history ==
=== Gubernatorial ===
Nebraska Republican Party gubernatorial election results
Election	Gubernatorial candidate	Votes	Vote %	Result
1994	Gene Spence	148,230	25.6%	Lost ✗
1998	Mike Johanns	293,910	53.90%	Won ✓
2002	Mike Johanns	330,349	68.68%	Won ✓
2006	Dave Heineman	434,802	73.4%	Won ✓
2010	Dave Heineman	360,645	73.90%	Won ✓
2014	Pete Ricketts	308,751	57.15%	Won ✓
2018	Pete Ricketts	411,812	59.00%	Won ✓
2022	Jim Pillen	398,334	59.22%	Won ✓
2026	Jim Pillen	380,604	50.41%	Won ✓
