= Bob Evnen =

American attorney and politician

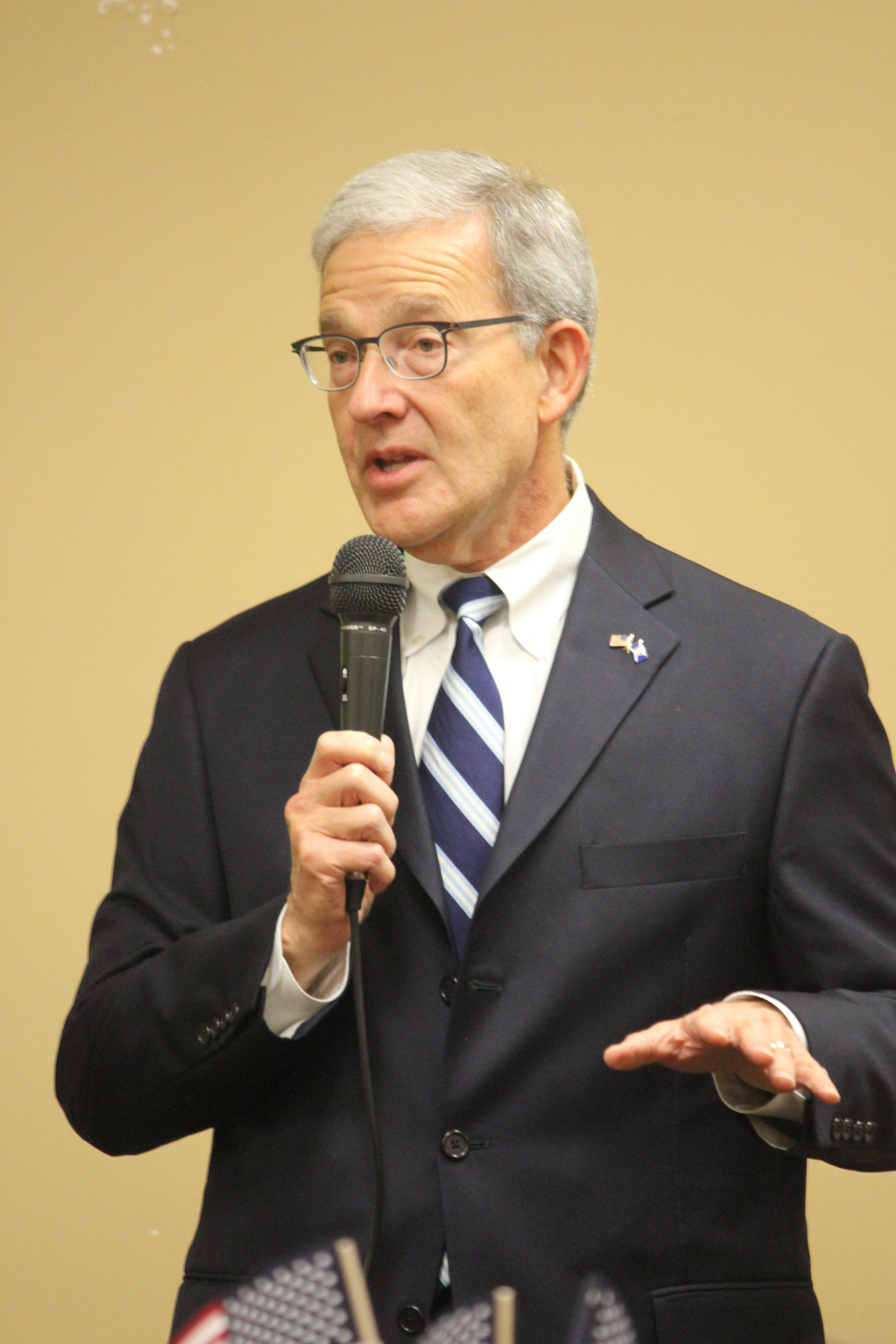
- Evnen in 2018

27th Secretary of State of Nebraska
- Incumbent
- Assumed office January 10, 2019
- Governor: Pete Ricketts; Jim Pillen
- Preceded by: John A. Gale

Personal details
- Born: Robert Barnett Evnen; September 29, 1952 (age 73) Sioux City, Iowa, U.S.
- Party: Republican
- Education: Michigan State University (BA); University of Southern California (JD)

Robert Barnett Evnen (born 1952) is an American attorney and Republican politician in the state of Nebraska. He is the 27th Secretary of State of Nebraska, serving since 2019.

Evnen was first elected Secretary of State in 2018, and re-elected in 2022 after winning the Republican primary with 40.89% of the vote. He ran for a third term in 2026, losing the Republican primary to Scott Petersen with 45.36% of the vote.

== Legal career ==
Evnen graduated from Michigan State University with a bachelor's degree in social science in 1974 and from the University of Southern California's Gould School of Law with a Juris Doctor in 1977. He was a partner at the Lincoln, Nebraska law firm Woods & Aitken, LLP for 32 years, where he practiced labor and employment law. He is licensed to practice law in Nebraska, Iowa, and California (inactive).

== Political career ==
Evnen served as a member of the State Board of Education, following his appointment by Governor Dave Heineman in 2005 and he was elected to a full term in 2008. He also served as general counsel to the Nebraska Republican Party and as campaign treasurer for U.S. Senator Deb Fischer.

In the 2018 elections, Evnen ran for Secretary of State of Nebraska. He won the election, defeating Spencer Danner, the Democratic Party nominee, and was sworn into office on January 10, 2019. Evnen supported Nebraska Attorney General Doug Peterson's decision to sign on to a lawsuit contesting the 2020 United States presidential election. Evnen's office later investigated allegations of voter fraud, saying that they "haven't found any validity or merit" to them.

Evnen ran for a second term in the 2022 election. He won the Republican primary with 40% of the vote, defeating two candidates who had endorsed President Donald Trump's false allegations of voter fraud in the 2020 presidential election, and won the general election unopposed.

Evnen ran for a third term in the 2026 election. He faced a primary challenge from Scott Petersen, an Omaha businessman, and Petersen defeated Evnen for the nomination.

== Electoral history ==
=== 2018 ===
Republican primary results
Party	Candidate	Votes	%
Republican	Bob Evnen	81,371	58.48%
Republican	Debra Perrell	57,816	41.52%
Total votes		139,187	100.00%

2018 Nebraska Secretary of State general election results
Party	Candidate	Votes	%	±%
Republican	Bob Evnen	406,632	60.64%	−14.55%
Democratic	Spencer Danner	263,982	39.36%	—
Majority		142,650	21.27%	−29.11%
Turnout		670,614		
Republican hold				

=== 2022 ===
Republican primary results by county Evnen: 30–40% 40–50% 50–60%; Borer: 30–40% 40–50% 50–60%; Schroder: 30–40% 40–50%

Republican primary results
Party	Candidate	Votes	%
Republican	Bob Evnen (inc.)	98,263	40.89
Republican	Robert J. Borer	72,150	30.02
Republican	Rex Schroder	53,628	22.29
Total votes		224,041	100.00

2022 Nebraska Secretary of State election
Party	Candidate	Votes	%
Republican	Bob Evnen (inc.)	500,342	100.00%
Total votes		500,342	100.00%
Republican hold			

=== 2026 ===
County results Petersen: 50–60%; 60–70%; 70–80%; Evnen: 50–60%

Republican primary
Party	Candidate	Votes	%
Republican	Scott Petersen	97,399	54.64
Republican	Bob Evnen (incumbent)	80,844	45.36
Total votes		178,243	100.00

Party political offices
Preceded by John A. Gale	Republican nominee for Secretary of State of Nebraska; 2018, 2022	Succeeded by Scott Petersen
Political offices
Preceded by John A. Gale	Secretary of State of Nebraska; 2019–present	Incumbent
