= Secretary of State of Nebraska =

Constitutional officer of the U.S. state of Nebraska

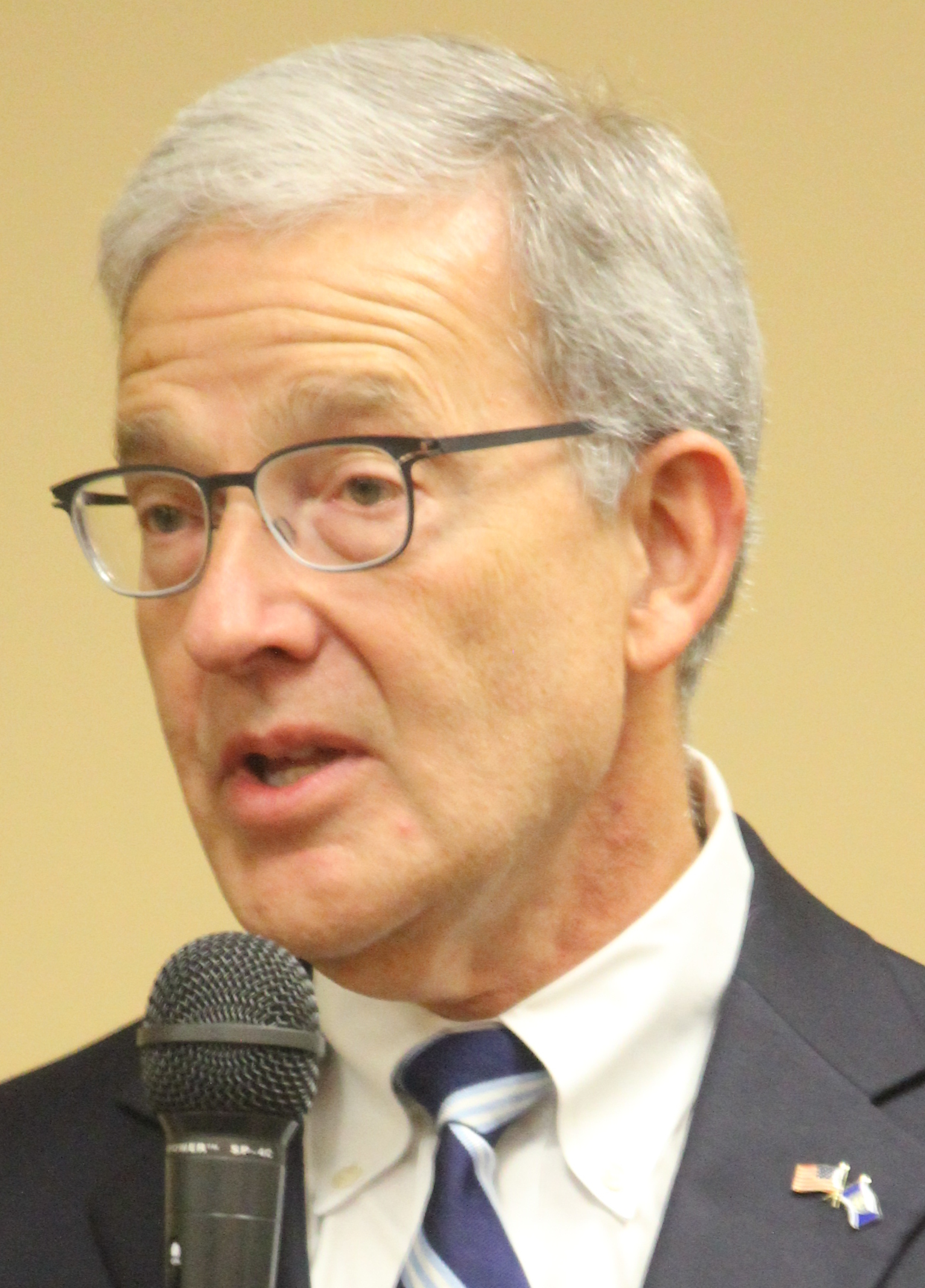
- Incumbent; Bob Evnen since January 10, 2019
- Type: Secretary of State
- Term length: 4 years
- Formation: 1854
- First holder: Thomas B. Cuming (Nebraska Territory); Thomas P. Kennard (State of Nebraska)
- Website: Official homepage of the Nebraska Secretary of State (Flash/Dynamic HTML website)

The secretary of state of Nebraska is one of the constitutional officers of the U.S. state of Nebraska. In Nebraska, the secretary of state is elected for a four-year term. Vacancies are filled by appointment by the governor of Nebraska.

The current officeholder is Bob Evnen, who took office in 2019.

== Organization ==
The secretary of state's office is composed of four divisions:

- The Business Services Division registers corporations, limited liability companies, limited partnerships, limited liability partnerships, trade names and trademarks. This division is also responsible for filing liens under the Uniform Commercial Code, licensing notaries public, and administering Nebraska's address confidentiality program.
- The Elections Division administers elections, including the implementation of the Help America Vote Act.
- The Records Management Division is responsible for storing state government records, converting them into different formats when necessary, and creates and administers records retention policies.
- The Licensing Division oversees the licensing of collection agencies, debt management agencies, private detectives, and polygraph and voice stress examiners.

== Additional duties ==
The Nebraska secretary of state is the keeper of the Great Seal of the State of Nebraska, and the state's main advisor on youth civics education. The secretary is also in charge of filing, certifying, and distributing state agency rules and regulations which are to become part of the Nebraska Administrative Code. The secretary is the state's "chief protocol officer", with the duty of promoting commerce, cultural exchange and educational studies between Nebraska and foreign nations.

=== Boards and commissions ===
The Nebraska secretary of state holds ex officio these posts of the following boards and commissions:

- Chairperson of the Nebraska State Records Board, which oversees electronic access to state government information and advises on the implementation of the Records Management Act.
- Chairperson of the Nebraska Real Estate Commission, which licenses real estate brokers and agents and investigates complaints against licensees.
- Chairperson of the Nebraska Collection Agency Licensing Board, which is responsible for licensing collection agencies.
- Secretary of the Nebraska Board of Pardons, which considers applications for pardons of criminal convictions and commutations of sentences.
- Secretary of the Board of State Canvassers, which certifies results following each statewide election.
- Member of the Nebraska Accountability and Disclosure Commission, which administers and enforces state laws regarding ethics, campaign finance and lobbying.

== List of secretaries of the Territory of Nebraska ==
#	Image	Name	Term of office	Party	Appointed By
1		Thomas B. Cuming (Note: Served as Acting Territorial Governor of Nebraska twice; first after the death of Francis Burt from October 18, 1854, to February 23, 1855, and second after the resignation of Mark W. Izard from October 25, 1857 to January 12, 1858.)	1854–1858 (Note: Died while in office on March 23, 1858.)	Democratic	Franklin Pierce
Acting		John B. Motley	1858	Unknown	
2		J. Sterling Morton (Note: Served as Acting Territorial Governor of Nebraska twice; first after the resignation of William A. Richardson from December 5, 1858, to May 2, 1859, and second after the resignation of Samuel W. Black from February 24, 1861, to March 6, 1861.)	1858–1861	Democratic	James Buchanan
3		Algernon S. Paddock (Note: Served as Acting Territorial Governor of Nebraska before the appointment of Alvin Saunders from March 6, 1861, to May 15, 1861.)	1861–1867	Republican	Abraham Lincoln

== List of secretaries of the State of Nebraska ==
Parties

Republican (22) Democratic (2) Fusion (Democratic/Populist) (1)

#	Image	Name	Term of office	Party
1		Thomas P. Kennard (Note: Term of office began Feb. 21, 1867.)	1867–1871	Republican
2		William H. James (Note: After the removal of Governor David Butler from office, William H. James served as Acting Governor of Nebraska for most of his term as Secretary of State, since at that time, under the Constitution of 1866, Nebraska had no lieutenant governor.)	1871–1873	Republican
3		John J. Gosper	1873–1875	Republican
4		Bruno Tzschuck	1875–1879	Republican
5		Samuel J. Alexander	1879–1883	Republican
6		Edward P. Roggen	1883–1887	Republican
7		Gilbert L. Laws (Note: Resigned Nov. 20, 1889, after he was elected to fill the unexpired term in Congress caused by the death of James Laird.)	1887–1889	Republican
8		Benjamin R. Cowdery (Note: Appointed by Governor John Milton Thayer to fill the vacancy created by the election of Gilbert L. Laws to the House of Representatives.)	1889–1891	Republican
9		John Clayton Allen	1891–1895	Republican
10		Joel A. Piper	1895–1897	Republican
11		William F. Porter	1897–1901	Fusion (Democratic/Populist)
12		George W. Marsh	1901–1905	Republican
13		Algernon Galusha	1905–1907	Republican
14		George C. Junkin	1907–1911	Republican
15		Addison Wait	1911–1915	Republican
16		Charles W. Pool	1915–1919	Democratic
17		Darius M. Amsberry	1919–1923	Republican
–		Charles W. Pool	1923–1927	Democratic
18		Frank Marsh Sr.	1927–1933	Republican
19		Harry R. Swanson	1933–1941	Democratic
–		Frank Marsh Sr. (Note: Died while in office on February 9, 1951.)	1941–1951	Republican
20		James S. Pittenger (Note: Appointed Feb. 10, 1951, by Governor Val Peterson to fill the vacancy created by the death of Frank Marsh Sr.)	1951–1953	Republican
21		Frank Marsh Jr.	1953–1971	Republican
22		Allen Beermann	1971–1995	Republican
23		Scott Moore (Note: Resigned to take a job with Union Pacific Railroad.)	1995–2000	Republican
24		John A. Gale (Note: Appointed Dec. 18, 2000, by Governor Mike Johanns to fill a vacancy created by the resignation of Scott Moore.)	2000–2019	Republican
25		Bob Evnen	2019–present	Republican

== See also ==
- List of company registers
