= Political party strength in Nebraska =

Politics in the US state of Nebraska

The following table indicates the party of elected officials in the U.S. state of Nebraska (including its time as a territory):

- Governor
- Lieutenant Governor
- Secretary of State
- Attorney General
- State Auditor of Public Accounts
- State Treasurer

The table also indicates the historical party composition in the:

- State Legislature (technically non-partisan since 1937)
- State delegation to the U.S. Senate
- State delegation to the U.S. House of Representatives (including non-voting delegate)

For years in which a presidential election was held, the table indicates which party's nominees received the state's electoral votes.

== Pre-statehood (1853–1866) ==
Year	Executive offices	Legislature	United States Congress
Year	Governor	Legislature	Delegate
1853	William Walker (I) (Note: Provisional)	no legislature	Napoleon Bonaparte Giddings (D)
1854	Francis Burt (D)	no legislature	Napoleon Bonaparte Giddings (D)
1855	Mark W. Izard (D)	Territorial legislature	Bird Beers Chapman (D)
1856	Mark W. Izard (D)	Territorial legislature	Bird Beers Chapman (D)
1857	Mark W. Izard (D)	Territorial legislature	Fenner Ferguson (D)
1858	William Alexander Richardson (D)	Territorial legislature	Fenner Ferguson (D)
1859	Samuel W. Black (D)	Territorial legislature	Experience Estabrook (D)
1860	Samuel W. Black (D)	Territorial legislature	Samuel Gordon Daily (R)
1861	Alvin Saunders (R)	Territorial legislature	Samuel Gordon Daily (R)
1862	Alvin Saunders (R)	Territorial legislature	Samuel Gordon Daily (R)
1863	Alvin Saunders (R)	Territorial legislature	Samuel Gordon Daily (R)
1864	Alvin Saunders (R)	Territorial legislature	Samuel Gordon Daily (R)
1865	Alvin Saunders (R)	Territorial legislature	Phineas Hitchcock (R)
1866	Alvin Saunders (R)	Territorial legislature	Phineas Hitchcock (R)

== 1867–1936 ==
Year	Executive offices						State Legislature		United States Congress			Electoral votes
Year	Governor	Lieutenant Governor	Secretary of State	Attorney General	Auditor	Treasurer	Senate	House	Senator (Class I)	Senator (Class II)	House	Electoral votes
1867	David Butler (R) (Note: Impeached and removed from office for misappropriation of state funds; the impeachment was expunged six years later.)	no such office	Thomas P. Kennard House (R)	Champion S. Chase (R)	John Gillespie (R)	Augustus Kountze (R)	R maj.	R maj.	Thomas Tipton (R)	John Milton Thayer (R)	Turner M. Marquett (R)	
1867	David Butler (R)	no such office	Thomas P. Kennard House (R)	Champion S. Chase (R)	John Gillespie (R)	Augustus Kountze (R)	R maj.	R maj.	Thomas Tipton (R)	John Milton Thayer (R)	John Taffe (R)	
1868	David Butler (R)	no such office	Thomas P. Kennard House (R)	Champion S. Chase (R)	John Gillespie (R)	Augustus Kountze (R)	R maj.	R maj.	Thomas Tipton (R)	John Milton Thayer (R)	John Taffe (R)	Grant/ Colfax (R) ✓
1869	David Butler (R)	no such office	Thomas P. Kennard House (R)	Seth Robinson (R)	John Gillespie (R)	James Sweet (R)	R maj.	R maj.	Thomas Tipton (R)	John Milton Thayer (R)	John Taffe (R)	Grant/ Colfax (R) ✓
1870	David Butler (R)	no such office	Thomas P. Kennard House (R)	Seth Robinson (R)	John Gillespie (R)	James Sweet (R)	R maj.	R maj.	Thomas Tipton (R)	John Milton Thayer (R)	John Taffe (R)	Grant/ Colfax (R) ✓
1871	David Butler (R)	no such office	William H. James (R)	George H. Roberts (R)	John Gillespie (R)	Henry A. Koenig (R)	R maj.	R maj.	Thomas Tipton (R)	Phineas Hitchcock (R)	John Taffe (R)	Grant/ Colfax (R) ✓
1871	William H. James (R) (Note: As state secretary of state, acted as governor for unexpired term.)	no such office	William H. James (R)	George H. Roberts (R)	John Gillespie (R)	Henry A. Koenig (R)	R maj.	R maj.	Thomas Tipton (R)	Phineas Hitchcock (R)	John Taffe (R)	Grant/ Colfax (R) ✓
1872	William H. James (R)	no such office	William H. James (R)	George H. Roberts (R)	John Gillespie (R)	Henry A. Koenig (R)	R maj.	R maj.	Thomas Tipton (R)	Phineas Hitchcock (R)	John Taffe (R)	Grant/ Wilson (R) ✓
1873	Robert Wilkinson Furnas (R)	no such office	John J. Gosper (R)	Joseph R. Webster (R)	Jefferson B. Weston (R)	Henry A. Koenig (R)	R maj.	R maj.	Thomas Tipton (R)	Phineas Hitchcock (R)	Lorenzo Crounse (R)	Grant/ Wilson (R) ✓
1874	Robert Wilkinson Furnas (R)	no such office	John J. Gosper (R)	Joseph R. Webster (R)	Jefferson B. Weston (R)	Henry A. Koenig (R)	R maj.	R maj.	Thomas Tipton (R)	Phineas Hitchcock (R)	Lorenzo Crounse (R)	Grant/ Wilson (R) ✓
1875	Silas Garber (R)	no such office	Bruno Tzschuck (R)	George H. Roberts (R)	Jefferson B. Weston (R)	J. C. McBride (R)	R maj.	R maj.	Algernon Paddock (R)	Phineas Hitchcock (R)	Lorenzo Crounse (R)	Grant/ Wilson (R) ✓
1876	Silas Garber (R)	no such office	Bruno Tzschuck (R)	George H. Roberts (R)	Jefferson B. Weston (R)	J. C. McBride (R)	R maj.	R maj.	Algernon Paddock (R)	Phineas Hitchcock (R)	Lorenzo Crounse (R)	Hayes/ Wheeler (R) ✓
1877	Silas Garber (R)	Othman A. Abbott (R)	Bruno Tzschuck (R)	George H. Roberts (R)	Jefferson B. Weston (R)	J. C. McBride (R)	R maj.	R maj.	Algernon Paddock (R)	Alvin Saunders (R)	Frank Welch (R) (Note: Died in office.)	Hayes/ Wheeler (R) ✓
1878	Silas Garber (R)	Othman A. Abbott (R)	Bruno Tzschuck (R)	George H. Roberts (R)	Jefferson B. Weston (R)	J. C. McBride (R)	R maj.	R maj.	Algernon Paddock (R)	Alvin Saunders (R)	Frank Welch (R)	Hayes/ Wheeler (R) ✓
1878	Silas Garber (R)	Othman A. Abbott (R)	Bruno Tzschuck (R)	George H. Roberts (R)	Jefferson B. Weston (R)	J. C. McBride (R)	R maj.	R maj.	Algernon Paddock (R)	Alvin Saunders (R)	Thomas Jefferson; Majors (R)	Hayes/ Wheeler (R) ✓
1879	Albinus Nance (R)	Edmund C. Carns (R)	S. J. Alexander (R)	C. J. Dilworth (R)	F. W. Liedtke (R)	George M. Bartlett (R)	R maj.	R maj.	Algernon Paddock (R)	Alvin Saunders (R)	Edward K. Valentine (R)	Hayes/ Wheeler (R) ✓
1880	Albinus Nance (R)	Edmund C. Carns (R)	S. J. Alexander (R)	C. J. Dilworth (R)	F. W. Liedtke (R)	George M. Bartlett (R)	R maj.	R maj.	Algernon Paddock (R)	Alvin Saunders (R)	Edward K. Valentine (R)	Garfield/ Arthur (R) ✗
1881	Albinus Nance (R)	Edmund C. Carns (R)	S. J. Alexander (R)	C. J. Dilworth (R)	John Wallichs (R)	George M. Bartlett (R)	R maj.	R maj.	Charles Van Wyck (R)	Alvin Saunders (R)	Edward K. Valentine (R)	Garfield/ Arthur (R) ✗
1882	Albinus Nance (R)	Edmund C. Carns (R)	S. J. Alexander (R)	C. J. Dilworth (R)	John Wallichs (R)	George M. Bartlett (R)	R maj.	R maj.	Charles Van Wyck (R)	Alvin Saunders (R)	Edward K. Valentine (R)	Garfield/ Arthur (R) ✗
1883	James W. Dawes (R)	Alfred W. Agee (R)	Edward P. Roggen (R)	Isaac Powers, Jr. (R)	John Wallichs (R)	Phelps D. Sturdevant (D/A-Mo)	D/A-Mo maj. (Note: The Coalition elected an Anti-Monopolist as Senate President Pro Tempore.)	R maj.	Charles Van Wyck (R)	Charles F. Manderson (R)	3R	Garfield/ Arthur (R) ✗
1884	James W. Dawes (R)	Alfred W. Agee (R)	Edward P. Roggen (R)	Isaac Powers, Jr. (R)	John Wallichs (R)	Phelps D. Sturdevant (D/A-Mo)	D/A-Mo maj.	R maj.	Charles Van Wyck (R)	Charles F. Manderson (R)	3R	Blaine/ Logan (R) ✗
1885	James W. Dawes (R)	Hibbard H. Shedd (R)	Edward P. Roggen (R)	William Leese (R)	H. A. Babcock (R)	Charles H. Willard (R)	R maj.	R maj.	Charles Van Wyck (R)	Charles F. Manderson (R)	3R	Blaine/ Logan (R) ✗
1886	James W. Dawes (R)	Hibbard H. Shedd (R)	Edward P. Roggen (R)	William Leese (R)	H. A. Babcock (R)	Charles H. Willard (R)	R maj.	R maj.	Charles Van Wyck (R)	Charles F. Manderson (R)	3R	Blaine/ Logan (R) ✗
1887	John Milton Thayer (R) (Note: James E. Boyd won the 1890 election and was sworn in on January 8, 1891. However, due to a question of his U.S. citizenship and eligibility for the office, he did not take office until February 8, 1892.)	Hibbard H. Shedd (R)	Gilbert L. Laws (R) (Note: Resigned on November 20, 1889 to take an elected seat in the United States House of Representatives.)	William Leese (R)	H. A. Babcock (R)	Charles H. Willard (R)	R maj.	R maj.	Algernon Paddock (R)	Charles F. Manderson (R)	2R, 1D	Blaine/ Logan (R) ✗
1888	John Milton Thayer (R)	Hibbard H. Shedd (R)	Gilbert L. Laws (R)	William Leese (R)	H. A. Babcock (R)	Charles H. Willard (R)	R maj.	R maj.	Algernon Paddock (R)	Charles F. Manderson (R)	2R, 1D	Harrison/ Morton (R) ✓
1889	John Milton Thayer (R)	George de Rue; Meiklejohn (R)	Gilbert L. Laws (R)	William Leese (R)	Thomas H. Benton (R)	John E. Hill (R)	R maj.	R maj.	Algernon Paddock (R)	Charles F. Manderson (R)	3R	Harrison/ Morton (R) ✓
1890	John Milton Thayer (R)	George de Rue; Meiklejohn (R)	Benjamin R. Cowdery (R) (Note: Appointed to fill vacancy.)	William Leese (R)	Thomas H. Benton (R)	John E. Hill (R)	R maj.	R maj.	Algernon Paddock (R)	Charles F. Manderson (R)	3R	Harrison/ Morton (R) ✓
1891	John Milton Thayer (R)	Thomas Jefferson; Majors (R)	John Clayton Allen (R)	George H. Hastings (R)	Thomas H. Benton (R)	John E. Hill (R)	Pop maj.	Pop maj.	Algernon Paddock (R)	Charles F. Manderson (R)	2Pop, 1D	Harrison/ Morton (R) ✓
1892	James E. Boyd (D)	Thomas Jefferson; Majors (R)	John Clayton Allen (R)	George H. Hastings (R)	Thomas H. Benton (R)	John E. Hill (R)	Pop maj.	Pop maj.	Algernon Paddock (R)	Charles F. Manderson (R)	2Pop, 1D	Harrison/ Reid (R) ✗
1893	Lorenzo Crounse (R)	Thomas Jefferson; Majors (R)	John Clayton Allen (R)	George H. Hastings (R)	Eugene Moore (R)	Joseph S. Bartley (R)	D/Pop maj.	D/Pop maj. (Note: A Republican was elected as Senate President Pro Tempore, but the chamber was organized by the coalition of Democrats and Populists.)	William V. Allen (Pop)	Charles F. Manderson (R)	3R, 2Pop, 1D	Harrison/ Reid (R) ✗
1894	Lorenzo Crounse (R)	Thomas Jefferson; Majors (R)	John Clayton Allen (R)	George H. Hastings (R)	Eugene Moore (R)	Joseph S. Bartley (R)	D/Pop maj.	D/Pop maj.	William V. Allen (Pop)	Charles F. Manderson (R)	3R, 2Pop, 1D	Harrison/ Reid (R) ✗
1895	Silas A. Holcomb (D/Pop)	Robert E. Moore (D/Pop)	Joel A. Piper (R)	Arthur S. Churchill (R)	Eugene Moore (R)	Joseph S. Bartley (R)	R maj.	R maj.	William V. Allen (Pop)	John M. Thurston (R)	5R, 1Pop	Harrison/ Reid (R) ✗
1896	Silas A. Holcomb (D/Pop)	Robert E. Moore (D/Pop)	Joel A. Piper (R)	Arthur S. Churchill (R)	Eugene Moore (R)	Joseph S. Bartley (R)	R maj.	R maj.	William V. Allen (Pop)	John M. Thurston (R)	5R, 1Pop	4 – Bryan/ Sewall (D/Sv) ✗ 4 – Bryan/ Watson (Pop) ✗
1897	Silas A. Holcomb (D/Pop)	James E. Harris (D/Pop)	William F. Porter (D/Pop)	Constantine Joseph; Smyth (D/Pop)	John F. Cornell (D/Pop)	John B. Meserve (D/Pop)	D/Pop/SvR maj.	D/Pop/SvR maj. (Note: A Silver Republican was elected as Senate President Pro Tempore, and the Silver Republicans were in coalition with the Democrats and Populists in organizing both chambers.)	William V. Allen (Pop)	John M. Thurston (R)	4Pop, 2R	4 – Bryan/ Sewall (D/Sv) ✗ 4 – Bryan/ Watson (Pop) ✗
1898	Silas A. Holcomb (D/Pop)	James E. Harris (D/Pop)	William F. Porter (D/Pop)	Constantine Joseph; Smyth (D/Pop)	John F. Cornell (D/Pop)	John B. Meserve (D/Pop)	D/Pop/SvR maj.	D/Pop/SvR maj.	William V. Allen (Pop)	John M. Thurston (R)	4Pop, 2R	4 – Bryan/ Sewall (D/Sv) ✗ 4 – Bryan/ Watson (Pop) ✗
1899	William A. Poynter (D/Pop)	Edward A. Gilbert (R)	William F. Porter (D/Pop)	Constantine Joseph; Smyth (D/Pop)	John F. Cornell (D/Pop)	John B. Meserve (D/Pop)	R maj.	R maj.	Monroe Hayward (R)	John M. Thurston (R)	3Pop, 2R, 1D	4 – Bryan/ Sewall (D/Sv) ✗ 4 – Bryan/ Watson (Pop) ✗
1900	William A. Poynter (D/Pop)	Edward A. Gilbert (R)	William F. Porter (D/Pop)	Constantine Joseph; Smyth (D/Pop)	John F. Cornell (D/Pop)	John B. Meserve (D/Pop)	R maj.	R maj.	William V. Allen (Pop) (Note: Appointed to fill vacancy; did not seek election.)	John M. Thurston (R)	3Pop, 2R, 1D	McKinley/ Roosevelt (R) ✓
1901	Charles H. Dietrich (R) (Note: Resigned on May 1, 1901 to take an elected seat in the United States Senate.)	Ezra P. Savage (R)	George W. Marsh (R)	Frank N. Prout (R)	Charles Weston (R)	William Stuefer (R)	R maj.	R maj.	William V. Allen (Pop)	Joseph Millard (R)	2D, 2Pop, 2R	McKinley/ Roosevelt (R) ✓
1901	Ezra P. Savage (R) (Note: As lieutenant governor, acted as governor for unexpired term.)	vacant	George W. Marsh (R)	Frank N. Prout (R)	Charles Weston (R)	William Stuefer (R)	R maj.	R maj.	Charles H. Dietrich (R)	Joseph Millard (R)	2D, 2Pop, 2R	McKinley/ Roosevelt (R) ✓
1902	Ezra P. Savage (R)	vacant	George W. Marsh (R)	Frank N. Prout (R)	Charles Weston (R)	William Stuefer (R)	R maj.	R maj.	Charles H. Dietrich (R)	Joseph Millard (R)	2D, 2Pop, 2R	McKinley/ Roosevelt (R) ✓
1903	John H. Mickey (R)	Edmund G. McGilton (R)	George W. Marsh (R)	Frank N. Prout (R)	Charles Weston (R)	Peter Mortensen (R)	R maj.	R maj.	Charles H. Dietrich (R)	Joseph Millard (R)	5R, 1D	McKinley/ Roosevelt (R) ✓
1904	John H. Mickey (R)	Edmund G. McGilton (R)	George W. Marsh (R)	Frank N. Prout (R)	Charles Weston (R)	Peter Mortensen (R)	R maj.	R maj.	Charles H. Dietrich (R)	Joseph Millard (R)	5R, 1D	Roosevelt/ Fairbanks (R) ✓
1905	John H. Mickey (R)	Edmund G. McGilton (R)	A. Galusha (R)	Norris Brown (R)	Edward N. Searle Jr. (R)	Peter Mortensen (R)	R maj.	R maj.	Elmer Burkett (R)	Joseph Millard (R)	6R	Roosevelt/ Fairbanks (R) ✓
1906	John H. Mickey (R)	Edmund G. McGilton (R)	A. Galusha (R)	Norris Brown (R)	Edward N. Searle Jr. (R)	Peter Mortensen (R)	R maj.	R maj.	Elmer Burkett (R)	Joseph Millard (R)	6R	Roosevelt/ Fairbanks (R) ✓
1907	George L. Sheldon (R)	Melville R. Hopewell (R)	George C. Junkin (R)	William T. Thompson (R) (Note: Resigned in 1910 to take office as Solicitor of the United States Treasury.)	Edward N. Searle Jr. (R)	L. G. Brian (R)	R maj.	R maj.	Elmer Burkett (R)	Norris Brown (R)	5R, 1D	Roosevelt/ Fairbanks (R) ✓
1908	George L. Sheldon (R)	Melville R. Hopewell (R)	George C. Junkin (R)	William T. Thompson (R)	Edward N. Searle Jr. (R)	L. G. Brian (R)	R maj.	R maj.	Elmer Burkett (R)	Norris Brown (R)	5R, 1D	Bryan/ Kern (D) ✗
1909	Ashton C. Shallenberger (D)	Melville R. Hopewell (R)	George C. Junkin (R)	William T. Thompson (R)	Silas Reynolds; Barton (R)	L. G. Brian (R)	D maj.	D maj.	Elmer Burkett (R)	Norris Brown (R)	3D, 3R	Bryan/ Kern (D) ✗
1910	Ashton C. Shallenberger (D)	Melville R. Hopewell (R)	George C. Junkin (R)	Arthur F. Mullen (D)	Silas Reynolds; Barton (R)	L. G. Brian (R)	D maj.	D maj.	Elmer Burkett (R)	Norris Brown (R)	3D, 3R	Bryan/ Kern (D) ✗
1911	Chester Hardy Aldrich (R)	Melville R. Hopewell (R)	Addison Wait (R)	Grant G. Martin (R)	Silas Reynolds; Barton (R)	Walter A. George (R)	D maj.	D maj.	Gilbert Hitchcock (D)	Norris Brown (R)	3D, 3R	Bryan/ Kern (D) ✗
1912	Chester Hardy Aldrich (R)	vacant	Addison Wait (R)	Grant G. Martin (R)	Silas Reynolds; Barton (R)	Walter A. George (R)	D maj.	D maj.	Gilbert Hitchcock (D)	Norris Brown (R)	3D, 3R	Wilson/ Marshall (D) ✓
1913	John H. Morehead (D)	Samuel Roy McKelvie (R)	Addison Wait (R)	Grant G. Martin (R)	W. B. Howard (R)	Walter A. George (R)	R maj.	D maj.	Gilbert Hitchcock (D)	George W. Norris (R)	3D, 3R	Wilson/ Marshall (D) ✓
1914	John H. Morehead (D)	Samuel Roy McKelvie (R)	Addison Wait (R)	Grant G. Martin (R)	W. B. Howard (R)	Walter A. George (R)	R maj.	D maj.	Gilbert Hitchcock (D)	George W. Norris (R)	3D, 3R	Wilson/ Marshall (D) ✓
1915	John H. Morehead (D)	James Pearson (D)	Charles W. Pool (D)	Willis E. Reed (D)	William H. Smith (D)	George E. Hall (D)	D maj.	D maj.	Gilbert Hitchcock (D)	George W. Norris (R)	3D, 3R	Wilson/ Marshall (D) ✓
1916	John H. Morehead (D)	James Pearson (D)	Charles W. Pool (D)	Willis E. Reed (D)	William H. Smith (D)	George E. Hall (D)	D maj.	D maj.	Gilbert Hitchcock (D)	George W. Norris (R)	3D, 3R	Wilson/ Marshall (D) ✓
1917	Keith Neville (D)	Edgar Howard (D)	Charles W. Pool (D)	Willis E. Reed (D)	William H. Smith (D)	George E. Hall (D)	D maj.	D maj.	Gilbert Hitchcock (D)	George W. Norris (R)	3D, 3R	Wilson/ Marshall (D) ✓
1918	Keith Neville (D)	Edgar Howard (D)	Charles W. Pool (D)	Willis E. Reed (D)	William H. Smith (D)	George E. Hall (D)	D maj.	D maj.	Gilbert Hitchcock (D)	George W. Norris (R)	3D, 3R	Wilson/ Marshall (D) ✓
1919	Samuel Roy McKelvie (R)	Pelham A. Barrows (R)	Darius M. Amsberry (R)	Clarence A. Davis (R)	George W. Marsh (R)	Daniel B. Cropsey (R)	R maj.	R maj.	Gilbert Hitchcock (D)	George W. Norris (R)	6R	Wilson/ Marshall (D) ✓
1920	Samuel Roy McKelvie (R)	Pelham A. Barrows (R)	Darius M. Amsberry (R)	Clarence A. Davis (R)	George W. Marsh (R)	Daniel B. Cropsey (R)	R maj.	R maj.	Gilbert Hitchcock (D)	George W. Norris (R)	6R	Harding/ Coolidge (R) ✓
1921	Samuel Roy McKelvie (R)	Pelham A. Barrows (R)	Darius M. Amsberry (R)	Clarence A. Davis (R)	George W. Marsh (R)	Daniel B. Cropsey (R)	R maj.	R maj.	Gilbert Hitchcock (D)	George W. Norris (R)	6R	Harding/ Coolidge (R) ✓
1922	Samuel Roy McKelvie (R)	Pelham A. Barrows (R)	Darius M. Amsberry (R)	Clarence A. Davis (R)	George W. Marsh (R)	Daniel B. Cropsey (R)	R maj.	R maj.	Gilbert Hitchcock (D)	George W. Norris (R)	6R	Harding/ Coolidge (R) ✓
1923	Charles W. Bryan (D)	Fred Gustus Johnson (R)	Charles W. Pool (D)	Ora S. Spillman (R)	George W. Marsh (R)	Charles D. Robinson (R)	R maj.	R maj.	Robert B. Howell (R)	George W. Norris (R)	3D, 3R	Harding/ Coolidge (R) ✓
1924	Charles W. Bryan (D)	Fred Gustus Johnson (R)	Charles W. Pool (D)	Ora S. Spillman (R)	George W. Marsh (R)	Charles D. Robinson (R)	R maj.	R maj.	Robert B. Howell (R)	George W. Norris (R)	3D, 3R	Coolidge/ Dawes (R) ✓
1925	Adam McMullen (R)	George A. Williams (R)	Charles W. Pool (D)	Ora S. Spillman (R)	George W. Marsh (R)	Charles D. Robinson (R)	R maj.	R maj.	Robert B. Howell (R)	George W. Norris (R)	3D, 3R	Coolidge/ Dawes (R) ✓
1926	Adam McMullen (R)	George A. Williams (R)	Charles W. Pool (D)	Ora S. Spillman (R)	George W. Marsh (R)	Charles D. Robinson (R)	R maj.	R maj.	Robert B. Howell (R)	George W. Norris (R)	3D, 3R	Coolidge/ Dawes (R) ✓
1927	Adam McMullen (R)	George A. Williams (R)	Frank Marsh Sr. (R)	Ora S. Spillman (R)	L. B. Johnson (R)	W. M. Stebbins (R)	R maj.	R maj.	Robert B. Howell (R)	George W. Norris (R)	4D, 2R	Coolidge/ Dawes (R) ✓
1928	Adam McMullen (R)	George A. Williams (R)	Frank Marsh Sr. (R)	Ora S. Spillman (R)	L. B. Johnson (R)	W. M. Stebbins (R)	R maj.	R maj.	Robert B. Howell (R)	George W. Norris (R)	4D, 2R	Hoover/ Curtis (R) ✓
1929	Arthur J. Weaver (R)	George A. Williams (R)	Frank Marsh Sr. (R)	Christian A. Sorensen (R)	L. B. Johnson (R)	W. M. Stebbins (R)	R maj.	R maj.	Robert B. Howell (R)	George W. Norris (R)	4R, 2D	Hoover/ Curtis (R) ✓
1930	Arthur J. Weaver (R)	George A. Williams (R)	Frank Marsh Sr. (R)	Christian A. Sorensen (R)	L. B. Johnson (R)	W. M. Stebbins (R)	R maj.	R maj.	Robert B. Howell (R)	George W. Norris (R)	4R, 2D	Hoover/ Curtis (R) ✓
1931	Charles W. Bryan (D)	Theodore W. Metcalfe (R)	Frank Marsh Sr. (R)	Christian A. Sorensen (R)	George W. Marsh (R)	Truman W. Bass (R)	R maj.	R maj.	Robert B. Howell (R)	George W. Norris (R)	4D, 2R	Hoover/ Curtis (R) ✓
1932	Charles W. Bryan (D)	Theodore W. Metcalfe (R)	Frank Marsh Sr. (R)	Christian A. Sorensen (R)	George W. Marsh (R)	Truman W. Bass (R)	R maj.	R maj.	Robert B. Howell (R)	George W. Norris (R)	4D, 2R	Roosevelt/ Garner (D) ✓
1933	Charles W. Bryan (D)	Walter H. Jurgensen (D)	Harry R. Swanson (D)	Paul F. Good (D)	William B. Price (D) (Note: Died in office on August 19, 1935.)	George E. Hall (D) (Note: Died in office on December 21, 1936.)	D maj.	D maj.	Robert B. Howell (R)	George W. Norris (R)	5D	Roosevelt/ Garner (D) ✓
1933	Charles W. Bryan (D)	Walter H. Jurgensen (D)	Harry R. Swanson (D)	Paul F. Good (D)	William B. Price (D)	George E. Hall (D)	D maj.	D maj.	William H. Thompson (D)	George W. Norris (R)	5D	Roosevelt/ Garner (D) ✓
1934	Charles W. Bryan (D)	Walter H. Jurgensen (D)	Harry R. Swanson (D)	Paul F. Good (D)	William B. Price (D)	George E. Hall (D)	D maj.	D maj.	William H. Thompson (D)	George W. Norris (R)	5D	Roosevelt/ Garner (D) ✓
1934	Charles W. Bryan (D)	Walter H. Jurgensen (D)	Harry R. Swanson (D)	Paul F. Good (D)	William B. Price (D)	George E. Hall (D)	D maj.	D maj.	Richard C. Hunter (D)	George W. Norris (R)	5D	Roosevelt/ Garner (D) ✓
1935	Robert Leroy Cochran (D)	Walter H. Jurgensen (D)	Harry R. Swanson (D)	William H. Wright (D)	William B. Price (D)	George E. Hall (D)	D maj.	D maj.	Edward R. Burke (D)	George W. Norris (R)	4D, 1R	Roosevelt/ Garner (D) ✓
1935	Robert Leroy Cochran (D)	Walter H. Jurgensen (D)	Harry R. Swanson (D)	William H. Wright (D)	Fred C. Ayres (D)	George E. Hall (D)	D maj.	D maj.	Edward R. Burke (D)	George W. Norris (R)	4D, 1R	Roosevelt/ Garner (D) ✓
1936	Robert Leroy Cochran (D)	Walter H. Jurgensen (D)	Harry R. Swanson (D)	William H. Wright (D)	Fred C. Ayres (D)	George E. Hall (D)	D maj.	D maj.	Edward R. Burke (D)	George W. Norris (I) (Note: Changed party affiliation from Republican to Independent in 1936.)	4D, 1R	Roosevelt/ Garner (D) ✓
1936	Robert Leroy Cochran (D)	Walter H. Jurgensen (D)	Harry R. Swanson (D)	William H. Wright (D)	Fred C. Ayres (D)	H. J. Murray (D)	D maj.	D maj.	Edward R. Burke (D)	George W. Norris (I)	4D, 1R	Roosevelt/ Garner (D) ✓

== 1937–present ==
Year	Executive offices						State Legislature (Note: Due to a constitutional amendment passed in 1934, effective with the 1936 election, the Nebraska Legislature became a non-partisan unicameral body with 43 elected members.)	United States Congress			Electoral votes
Year	Governor	Lieutenant Governor	Secretary of State	Attorney General	Auditor	Treasurer	State Legislature	Senator (Class I)	Senator (Class II)	House	Electoral votes
1937	Robert Leroy Cochran (D)	Walter H. Jurgensen (D)	Harry R. Swanson (D)	Richard C. Hunter (D)	William H. Price (D)	Walter H. Jensen (D)	43NP (22R, 21D)	Edward R. Burke (D)	George W. Norris (I)	4D, 1R	
1938	Robert Leroy Cochran (D)	Walter H. Jurgensen (D)	Harry R. Swanson (D)	Richard C. Hunter (D)	William H. Price (D)	Walter H. Jensen (D)	43NP (22R, 21D)	Edward R. Burke (D)	George W. Norris (I)	4D, 1R	
1938	Robert Leroy Cochran (D)	Nate M. Parsons (D)	Harry R. Swanson (D)	Richard C. Hunter (D)	William H. Price (D)	Walter H. Jensen (D)	43NP (22R, 21D)	Edward R. Burke (D)	George W. Norris (I)	4D, 1R	
1939	Robert Leroy Cochran (D)	William E. Johnson (R)	Harry R. Swanson (D)	Walter R. Johnson (R)	Ray C. Johnson (R)	Truman W. Bass (R) (Note: Died in office on August 21, 1939.)	43NP (24R, 19D)	Edward R. Burke (D)	George W. Norris (I)	3R, 2D	
1939	Robert Leroy Cochran (D)	William E. Johnson (R)	Harry R. Swanson (D)	Walter R. Johnson (R)	Ray C. Johnson (R)	John Havekost (D)	43NP (24R, 19D)	Edward R. Burke (D)	George W. Norris (I)	3R, 2D	
1940	Robert Leroy Cochran (D)	William E. Johnson (R)	Harry R. Swanson (D)	Walter R. Johnson (R)	Ray C. Johnson (R)	John Havekost (D)	43NP (24R, 19D)	Edward R. Burke (D)	George W. Norris (I)	3R, 2D	Willkie/ McNary (R) ✗
1941	Dwight Griswold (R)	William E. Johnson (R)	Frank Marsh Sr. (R) (Note: Died in office on February 9, 1951.)	Walter R. Johnson (R)	Ray C. Johnson (R)	L. B. Johnson (R)	43NP (26R, 17D)	Hugh A. Butler (R)	George W. Norris (I)	3R, 2D	Willkie/ McNary (R) ✗
1942	Dwight Griswold (R)	William E. Johnson (R)	Frank Marsh Sr. (R)	Walter R. Johnson (R)	Ray C. Johnson (R)	L. B. Johnson (R)	43NP (26R, 17D)	Hugh A. Butler (R)	George W. Norris (I)	3R, 2D	Willkie/ McNary (R) ✗
1943	Dwight Griswold (R)	Roy W. Johnson (R)	Frank Marsh Sr. (R)	Walter R. Johnson (R)	Ray C. Johnson (R)	Carl G. Swanson (R) (Note: Resigned on December 31, 1945.)	43NP (26R, 13D; 4 not reported)	Hugh A. Butler (R)	Kenneth S. Wherry (R)	4R	Willkie/ McNary (R) ✗
1944	Dwight Griswold (R)	Roy W. Johnson (R)	Frank Marsh Sr. (R)	Walter R. Johnson (R)	Ray C. Johnson (R)	Carl G. Swanson (R)	43NP (25R, 13D; 5 not reported)	Hugh A. Butler (R)	Kenneth S. Wherry (R)	4R	Dewey/ Bricker (R) ✗
1945	Dwight Griswold (R)	Roy W. Johnson (R)	Frank Marsh Sr. (R)	Walter R. Johnson (R)	Ray C. Johnson (R)	Carl G. Swanson (R)	43NP (28R, 7D; 8 not reported)	Hugh A. Butler (R)	Kenneth S. Wherry (R)	4R	Dewey/ Bricker (R) ✗
1946	Dwight Griswold (R)	Roy W. Johnson (R)	Frank Marsh Sr. (R)	Walter R. Johnson (R)	Ray C. Johnson (R)	Edward Gillette (R) (Note: Appointed to fill vacancy; subsequently elected.)	43NP (28R, 7D; 8 not reported)	Hugh A. Butler (R)	Kenneth S. Wherry (R)	4R	Dewey/ Bricker (R) ✗
1947	Val Peterson (R)	Robert B. Crosby (R)	Frank Marsh Sr. (R)	Walter R. Johnson (R)	Ray C. Johnson (R)	Edward Gillette (R)	43NP (20R, 9D; 14 not reported)	Hugh A. Butler (R)	Kenneth S. Wherry (R)	4R	Dewey/ Bricker (R) ✗
1948	Val Peterson (R)	Robert B. Crosby (R)	Frank Marsh Sr. (R)	Walter R. Johnson (R)	Ray C. Johnson (R)	Edward Gillette (R)	43NP (20R, 9D; 14 not reported)	Hugh A. Butler (R)	Kenneth S. Wherry (R)	4R	Dewey/ Warren (R) ✗
1949	Val Peterson (R)	Charles J. Warner (R)	Frank Marsh Sr. (R)	James Hodson; Anderson (R) (Note: Resigned.)	Ray C. Johnson (R)	Edward Gillette (R)	43NP (22R, 5D; 16 not reported)	Hugh A. Butler (R)	Kenneth S. Wherry (R)	3R, 1D	Dewey/ Warren (R) ✗
1950	Val Peterson (R)	Charles J. Warner (R)	Frank Marsh Sr. (R)	Clarence S. Beck (R)	Ray C. Johnson (R)	Edward Gillette (R)	43NP (23R, 5D; 15 not reported)	Hugh A. Butler (R)	Kenneth S. Wherry (R)	3R, 1D	Dewey/ Warren (R) ✗
1951	Val Peterson (R)	Charles J. Warner (R)	James S. Pittenger (R)	Clarence S. Beck (R)	Ray C. Johnson (R)	Frank B. Heintze (R)	43NP (25R, 5D, 1I; 12 not reported)	Hugh A. Butler (R)	Kenneth S. Wherry (R)	4R	Dewey/ Warren (R) ✗
1952	Val Peterson (R)	Charles J. Warner (R)	James S. Pittenger (R)	Clarence S. Beck (R)	Ray C. Johnson (R)	Frank B. Heintze (R)	43NP (25R, 5D, 1I; 12 not reported)	Hugh A. Butler (R)	Fred A. Seaton (R)	4R	Eisenhower/ Nixon (R) ✓
1952	Val Peterson (R)	Charles J. Warner (R)	James S. Pittenger (R)	Clarence S. Beck (R)	Ray C. Johnson (R)	Frank B. Heintze (R)	43NP (25R, 5D, 1I; 12 not reported)	Hugh A. Butler (R)	Dwight Griswold (R)	4R	Eisenhower/ Nixon (R) ✓
1953	Robert B. Crosby (R)	Charles J. Warner (R)	Frank Marsh (R)	Clarence S. Beck (R)	Ray C. Johnson (R)	Frank B. Heintze (R)	43NP (26R, 5D, 1I; 11 not reported)	Hugh A. Butler (R)	Dwight Griswold (R)	4R	Eisenhower/ Nixon (R) ✓
1954	Robert B. Crosby (R)	Charles J. Warner (R)	Frank Marsh (R)	Clarence S. Beck (R)	Ray C. Johnson (R)	Frank B. Heintze (R)	43NP (26R, 4D, 1I; 12 not reported)	Hugh A. Butler (R)	Dwight Griswold (R)	4R	Eisenhower/ Nixon (R) ✓
1954	Robert B. Crosby (R)	Charles J. Warner (R)	Frank Marsh (R)	Clarence S. Beck (R)	Ray C. Johnson (R)	Frank B. Heintze (R)	43NP (26R, 4D, 1I; 12 not reported)	Samuel W. Reynolds (R)	Eva Bowring (R)	4R	Eisenhower/ Nixon (R) ✓
1954	Robert B. Crosby (R)	Charles J. Warner (R)	Frank Marsh (R)	Clarence S. Beck (R)	Ray C. Johnson (R)	Frank B. Heintze (R)	43NP (26R, 4D, 1I; 12 not reported)	Roman Hruska (R)	Hazel Abel (R)	4R	Eisenhower/ Nixon (R) ✓
1955	Victor Anderson (R)	Charles J. Warner (R)	Frank Marsh (R)	Clarence S. Beck (R)	Ray C. Johnson (R)	Ralph W. Hill (R) (Note: Died in office on July 13, 1958.)	43NP (23R, 8D, 2I; 10 not reported)	Roman Hruska (R)	Carl Curtis (R)	4R	Eisenhower/ Nixon (R) ✓
1956	Victor Anderson (R)	vacant	Frank Marsh (R)	Clarence S. Beck (R)	Ray C. Johnson (R)	Ralph W. Hill (R)	43NP (23R, 8D, 2I; 10 not reported)	Roman Hruska (R)	Carl Curtis (R)	4R	Eisenhower/ Nixon (R) ✓
1957	Victor Anderson (R)	Dwight Burney (R)	Frank Marsh (R)	Clarence S. Beck (R)	Ray C. Johnson (R)	Ralph W. Hill (R)	43NP (25R, 13D, 1I; 4 not reported)	Roman Hruska (R)	Carl Curtis (R)	4R	Eisenhower/ Nixon (R) ✓
1958	Victor Anderson (R)	Dwight Burney (R)	Frank Marsh (R)	Clarence S. Beck (R)	Ray C. Johnson (R)	Bertha I. Hill (R)	43NP (25R, 13D, 1I; 4 not reported)	Roman Hruska (R)	Carl Curtis (R)	4R	Eisenhower/ Nixon (R) ✓
1959	Ralph Brooks (D)	Dwight Burney (R)	Frank Marsh (R)	Clarence S. Beck (R)	Ray C. Johnson (R)	Richard R. Larsen (D)	43NP (31R, 9D, 3I)	Roman Hruska (R)	Carl Curtis (R)	2D, 2R	Eisenhower/ Nixon (R) ✓
1960	Ralph Brooks (D)	Dwight Burney (R)	Frank Marsh (R)	Clarence S. Beck (R)	Ray C. Johnson (R)	Richard R. Larsen (D)	43NP (31R, 9D, 3I)	Roman Hruska (R)	Carl Curtis (R)	2D, 2R	Nixon/ Lodge (R) ✗
1960	Dwight Burney (R)	Dwight Burney (R)	Frank Marsh (R)	Clarence S. Beck (R)	Ray C. Johnson (R)	Richard R. Larsen (D)	43NP (31R, 9D, 3I)	Roman Hruska (R)	Carl Curtis (R)	2D, 2R	Nixon/ Lodge (R) ✗
1961	Frank B. Morrison (D)	Dwight Burney (R)	Frank Marsh (R)	Clarence A. H. Meyer (R)	Ray C. Johnson (R)	Clarence L. E. Swanson (R) (Note: Died in office on April 5, 1964.)	43NP (26R, 11D, 3I; 3 not reported)	Roman Hruska (R)	Carl Curtis (R)	4R	Nixon/ Lodge (R) ✗
1962	Frank B. Morrison (D)	Dwight Burney (R)	Frank Marsh (R)	Clarence A. H. Meyer (R)	Ray C. Johnson (R)	Clarence L. E. Swanson (R)	43NP (27R, 10D, 3I; 3 not reported)	Roman Hruska (R)	Carl Curtis (R)	4R	Nixon/ Lodge (R) ✗
1963	Frank B. Morrison (D)	Dwight Burney (R)	Frank Marsh (R)	Clarence A. H. Meyer (R)	Ray C. Johnson (R)	Clarence L. E. Swanson (R)	43NP (29R, 12D, 2I)	Roman Hruska (R)	Carl Curtis (R)	3R	Nixon/ Lodge (R) ✗
1964	Frank B. Morrison (D)	Dwight Burney (R)	Frank Marsh (R)	Clarence A. H. Meyer (R)	Ray C. Johnson (R)	P. Merle Humphries (R)	43NP (28R, 13D, 2I)	Roman Hruska (R)	Carl Curtis (R)	3R	Johnson/ Humphrey (D) ✓
1965	Frank B. Morrison (D)	Philip Sorensen (D)	Frank Marsh (R)	Clarence A. H. Meyer (R)	Ray C. Johnson (R)	Fred Sorensen (D)	49NP (Note: Due to the mandate of "one man, one vote" in Baker v. Carr and Reynolds v. Sims in redistricting, the Legislature expanded to 49 members.) (31R, 12D, 2I; 4 not reported)	Roman Hruska (R)	Carl Curtis (R)	2R, 1D	Johnson/ Humphrey (D) ✓
1966	Frank B. Morrison (D)	Philip Sorensen (D)	Frank Marsh (R)	Clarence A. H. Meyer (R)	Ray C. Johnson (R)	Fred Sorensen (D)	49NP (31R, 12D, 2I; 4 not reported)	Roman Hruska (R)	Carl Curtis (R)	2R, 1D	Johnson/ Humphrey (D) ✓
1967	Norbert Tiemann (R)	John Everroad (R)	Frank Marsh (R)	Clarence A. H. Meyer (R)	Ray C. Johnson (R)	Wayne Swanson (R)	49NP (33R, 12D, 2I; 2 not reported)	Roman Hruska (R)	Carl Curtis (R)	3R	Johnson/ Humphrey (D) ✓
1968	Norbert Tiemann (R)	John Everroad (R)	Frank Marsh (R)	Clarence A. H. Meyer (R)	Ray C. Johnson (R)	Wayne Swanson (R)	49NP (33R, 12D, 2I; 2 not reported)	Roman Hruska (R)	Carl Curtis (R)	3R	Nixon/ Agnew (R) ✓
1969	Norbert Tiemann (R)	John Everroad (R)	Frank Marsh (R)	Clarence A. H. Meyer (R)	Ray C. Johnson (R)	Wayne Swanson (R)	49NP (36R, 11D; 2 not reported)	Roman Hruska (R)	Carl Curtis (R)	3R	Nixon/ Agnew (R) ✓
1970	Norbert Tiemann (R)	John Everroad (R)	Frank Marsh (R)	Clarence A. H. Meyer (R)	Ray C. Johnson (R)	Wayne Swanson (R)	49NP (36R, 11D; 2 not reported)	Roman Hruska (R)	Carl Curtis (R)	3R	Nixon/ Agnew (R) ✓
1971	J. James Exon (D)	Frank Marsh (R)	Allen Beermann (R)	Clarence A. H. Meyer (R)	Ray A. C. Johnson (R)	Wayne Swanson (R)	49NP (36R, 12D, 1I)	Roman Hruska (R)	Carl Curtis (R)	3R	Nixon/ Agnew (R) ✓
1972	J. James Exon (D)	Frank Marsh (R)	Allen Beermann (R)	Clarence A. H. Meyer (R)	Ray A. C. Johnson (R)	Wayne Swanson (R)	49NP (36R, 12D, 1I)	Roman Hruska (R)	Carl Curtis (R)	3R	Nixon/ Agnew (R) ✓
1973	J. James Exon (D)	Frank Marsh (R)	Allen Beermann (R)	Clarence A. H. Meyer (R)	Ray A. C. Johnson (R)	Wayne Swanson (R)	49NP (33R, 15D, 1I)	Roman Hruska (R)	Carl Curtis (R)	3R	Nixon/ Agnew (R) ✓
1974	J. James Exon (D)	Frank Marsh (R)	Allen Beermann (R)	Clarence A. H. Meyer (R)	Ray A. C. Johnson (R)	Wayne Swanson (R)	49NP (33R, 15D, 1I)	Roman Hruska (R)	Carl Curtis (R)	3R	Nixon/ Agnew (R) ✓
1975	J. James Exon (D)	Gerald Whelan (D)	Allen Beermann (R)	Paul L. Douglas (R)	Ray A. C. Johnson (R)	Frank Marsh (R)	49NP (33R, 15D, 1I)	Roman Hruska (R)	Carl Curtis (R)	3R	Nixon/ Agnew (R) ✓
1976	J. James Exon (D)	Gerald Whelan (D)	Allen Beermann (R)	Paul L. Douglas (R)	Ray A. C. Johnson (R)	Frank Marsh (R)	49NP (33R, 15D, 1I)	Roman Hruska (R)	Carl Curtis (R)	3R	Ford/ Dole (R) ✗
1977	J. James Exon (D)	Gerald Whelan (D)	Allen Beermann (R)	Paul L. Douglas (R)	Ray A. C. Johnson (R)	Frank Marsh (R)	49NP (30R, 17D, 2I)	Edward Zorinsky (D)	Carl Curtis (R)	2R, 1D	Ford/ Dole (R) ✗
1978	J. James Exon (D)	Gerald Whelan (D)	Allen Beermann (R)	Paul L. Douglas (R)	Ray A. C. Johnson (R)	Frank Marsh (R)	49NP (28R, 19D, 2I)	Edward Zorinsky (D)	Carl Curtis (R)	2R, 1D	Ford/ Dole (R) ✗
1979	Charles Thone (R)	Roland Luedtke (R)	Allen Beermann (R)	Paul L. Douglas (R)	Ray A. C. Johnson (R)	Frank Marsh (R)	49NP (25R, 22D, 2I)	Edward Zorinsky (D)	J. James Exon (D)	2R, 1D	Ford/ Dole (R) ✗
1980	Charles Thone (R)	Roland Luedtke (R)	Allen Beermann (R)	Paul L. Douglas (R)	Ray A. C. Johnson (R)	Frank Marsh (R)	49NP (25R, 22D, 2I)	Edward Zorinsky (D)	J. James Exon (D)	2R, 1D	Reagan/ Bush (R) ✓
1981	Charles Thone (R)	Roland Luedtke (R)	Allen Beermann (R)	Paul L. Douglas (R)	Ray A. C. Johnson (R)	Kay Orr (R)	49NP (30R, 17D, 2I)	Edward Zorinsky (D)	J. James Exon (D)	3R	Reagan/ Bush (R) ✓
1982	Charles Thone (R)	Roland Luedtke (R)	Allen Beermann (R)	Paul L. Douglas (R)	Ray A. C. Johnson (R)	Kay Orr (R)	49NP (31R, 16D, 2I)	Edward Zorinsky (D)	J. James Exon (D)	3R	Reagan/ Bush (R) ✓
1983	Bob Kerrey (D)	Donald McGinley (D)	Allen Beermann (R)	Paul L. Douglas (R)	Ray A. C. Johnson (R)	Kay Orr (R)	49NP (30R, 17D, 2I)	Edward Zorinsky (D)	J. James Exon (D)	3R	Reagan/ Bush (R) ✓
1984	Bob Kerrey (D)	Donald McGinley (D)	Allen Beermann (R)	Paul L. Douglas (R)	Ray A. C. Johnson (R)	Kay Orr (R)	49NP (29R, 19D, 1I)	Edward Zorinsky (D)	J. James Exon (D)	3R	Reagan/ Bush (R) ✓
1985	Bob Kerrey (D)	Donald McGinley (D)	Allen Beermann (R)	Robert Spire (R)	Ray A. C. Johnson (R)	Kay Orr (R)	49NP (26R, 22D, 1I)	Edward Zorinsky (D)	J. James Exon (D)	3R	Reagan/ Bush (R) ✓
1986	Bob Kerrey (D)	Donald McGinley (D)	Allen Beermann (R)	Robert Spire (R)	Ray A. C. Johnson (R)	Kay Orr (R)	49NP (25R, 23D, 1I)	Edward Zorinsky (D)	J. James Exon (D)	3R	Reagan/ Bush (R) ✓
1987	Kay Orr (R)	William E. Nichol (R)	Allen Beermann (R)	Robert Spire (R)	Ray A. C. Johnson (R)	Frank Marsh (R)	49NP (26R, 22D, 1I)	Edward Zorinsky (D)	J. James Exon (D)	3R	Reagan/ Bush (R) ✓
1987	Kay Orr (R)	William E. Nichol (R)	Allen Beermann (R)	Robert Spire (R)	Ray A. C. Johnson (R)	Frank Marsh (R)	49NP (26R, 22D, 1I)	David Karnes (R) (Note: Appointed to fill vacancy; lost election to a full term.)	J. James Exon (D)	3R	Reagan/ Bush (R) ✓
1988	Kay Orr (R)	William E. Nichol (R)	Allen Beermann (R)	Robert Spire (R)	Ray A. C. Johnson (R)	Frank Marsh (R)	49NP (27R, 21D, 1I)	David Karnes (R)	J. James Exon (D)	3R	Bush/ Quayle (R) ✓
1989	Kay Orr (R)	William E. Nichol (R)	Allen Beermann (R)	Robert Spire (R)	Ray A. C. Johnson (R)	Frank Marsh (R)	49NP (28R, 20D, 1I)	Bob Kerrey (D)	J. James Exon (D)	2R, 1D	Bush/ Quayle (R) ✓
1990	Kay Orr (R)	William E. Nichol (R)	Allen Beermann (R)	Robert Spire (R)	Ray A. C. Johnson (R)	Frank Marsh (R)	49NP (29R, 19D, 1I)	Bob Kerrey (D)	J. James Exon (D)	2R, 1D	Bush/ Quayle (R) ✓
1991	Ben Nelson (D)	Maxine Moul (D) (Note: Resigned on October 4, 1993 to take office as director of the Nebraska Department of Economic Development.)	Allen Beermann (R)	Don Stenberg (R)	John Breslow (D)	Dawn Rockey (D)	49NP (27R, 21D, 1I)	Bob Kerrey (D)	J. James Exon (D)	2R, 1D	Bush/ Quayle (R) ✓
1992	Ben Nelson (D)	Maxine Moul (D)	Allen Beermann (R)	Don Stenberg (R)	John Breslow (D)	Dawn Rockey (D)	49NP (26R, 22D, 1I)	Bob Kerrey (D)	J. James Exon (D)	2R, 1D	Bush/ Quayle (R) ✗
1993	Ben Nelson (D)	Maxine Moul (D)	Allen Beermann (R)	Don Stenberg (R)	John Breslow (D)	Dawn Rockey (D)	49NP (26R, 22D, 1I)	Bob Kerrey (D)	J. James Exon (D)	2R, 1D	Bush/ Quayle (R) ✗
1993	Ben Nelson (D)	Kim Robak (D)	Allen Beermann (R)	Don Stenberg (R)	John Breslow (D)	Dawn Rockey (D)	49NP (26R, 22D, 1I)	Bob Kerrey (D)	J. James Exon (D)	2R, 1D	Bush/ Quayle (R) ✗
1994	Ben Nelson (D)	Kim Robak (D)	Allen Beermann (R)	Don Stenberg (R)	John Breslow (D)	Dawn Rockey (D)	49NP (25R, 23D, 1I)	Bob Kerrey (D)	J. James Exon (D)	2R, 1D	Bush/ Quayle (R) ✗
1995	Ben Nelson (D)	Kim Robak (D)	Scott Moore (R) (Note: Resigned on December 15, 2000 to take a position with Union Pacific Railroad.)	Don Stenberg (R)	John Breslow (R) (Note: Changed party affiliation from Democratic to Republican in November 1994 after winning reelection as a Democrat.)	Dave Heineman (R) (Note: Resigned on October 1, 2001 to take office as Lieutenant Governor.)	49NP (26R, 22D, 1I)	Bob Kerrey (D)	J. James Exon (D)	3R	Bush/ Quayle (R) ✗
1996	Ben Nelson (D)	Kim Robak (D)	Scott Moore (R)	Don Stenberg (R)	John Breslow (R)	Dave Heineman (R)	49NP (26R, 22D, 1I)	Bob Kerrey (D)	J. James Exon (D)	3R	Dole/ Kemp (R) ✗
1997	Ben Nelson (D)	Kim Robak (D)	Scott Moore (R)	Don Stenberg (R)	John Breslow (R)	Dave Heineman (R)	49NP (27R, 21D, 1I)	Bob Kerrey (D)	Chuck Hagel (R)	3R	Dole/ Kemp (R) ✗
1998	Ben Nelson (D)	Kim Robak (D)	Scott Moore (R)	Don Stenberg (R)	John Breslow (R)	Dave Heineman (R)	49NP (26R, 21D, 2I)	Bob Kerrey (D)	Chuck Hagel (R)	3R	Dole/ Kemp (R) ✗
1999	Mike Johanns (R) (Note: Resigned on January 20, 2005 to take office as United States Secretary of Agriculture.)	David Maurstad (R) (Note: Resigned on October 1, 2001 to take office as director of Federal Emergency Management Agency Region VIII.)	Scott Moore (R)	Don Stenberg (R)	Kate Witek (R)	Dave Heineman (R)	49NP (28R, 19D, 2I)	Bob Kerrey (D)	Chuck Hagel (R)	3R	Dole/ Kemp (R) ✗
2000	Mike Johanns (R)	David Maurstad (R)	Scott Moore (R)	Don Stenberg (R)	Kate Witek (R)	Dave Heineman (R)	49NP (29R, 18D, 2I)	Bob Kerrey (D)	Chuck Hagel (R)	3R	Bush and Cheney (R) ✓
2001	Mike Johanns (R)	David Maurstad (R)	John A. Gale (R)	Don Stenberg (R)	Kate Witek (R)	Dave Heineman (R)	49NP (31R, 16D, 2I)	Ben Nelson (D)	Chuck Hagel (R)	3R	Bush and Cheney (R) ✓
2001	Mike Johanns (R)	Dave Heineman (R)	John A. Gale (R)	Don Stenberg (R)	Kate Witek (R)	Lorelee Hunt Byrd (R) (Note: Resigned on January 6, 2004.)	49NP (31R, 16D, 2I)	Ben Nelson (D)	Chuck Hagel (R)	3R	Bush and Cheney (R) ✓
2002	Mike Johanns (R)	Dave Heineman (R)	John A. Gale (R)	Don Stenberg (R)	Kate Witek (R)	Lorelee Hunt Byrd (R)	49NP (31R, 16D, 2I)	Ben Nelson (D)	Chuck Hagel (R)	3R	Bush and Cheney (R) ✓
2003	Mike Johanns (R)	Dave Heineman (R)	John A. Gale (R)	Jon Bruning (R)	Kate Witek (R)	Lorelee Hunt Byrd (R)	49NP (34R, 13D, 2I)	Ben Nelson (D)	Chuck Hagel (R)	3R	Bush and Cheney (R) ✓
2004	Mike Johanns (R)	Dave Heineman (R)	John A. Gale (R)	Jon Bruning (R)	Kate Witek (R)	Ron Ross (R)	49NP (34R, 13D, 2I)	Ben Nelson (D)	Chuck Hagel (R)	3R	Bush and Cheney (R) ✓
2005	Dave Heineman (R) (Note: As lieutenant governor, acted as governor for unexpired term and was later elected in his own right.)	Rick Sheehy (R)	John A. Gale (R)	Jon Bruning (R)	Kate Witek (R)	Ron Ross (R)	49NP (32R, 15D, 2I)	Ben Nelson (D)	Chuck Hagel (R)	3R	Bush and Cheney (R) ✓
2006	Dave Heineman (R)	Rick Sheehy (R)	John A. Gale (R)	Jon Bruning (R)	Kate Witek (D) (Note: Changed party affiliation from Republican to Democratic in August 2006.)	Ron Ross (R)	49NP (32R, 15D, 2I)	Ben Nelson (D)	Chuck Hagel (R)	3R	Bush and Cheney (R) ✓
2007	Dave Heineman (R)	Rick Sheehy (R)	John A. Gale (R)	Jon Bruning (R)	Mike Foley (R)	Shane Osborn (R)	49NP (30R, 17D, 2I)	Ben Nelson (D)	Chuck Hagel (R)	3R	Bush and Cheney (R) ✓
2008	Dave Heineman (R)	Rick Sheehy (R)	John A. Gale (R)	Jon Bruning (R)	Mike Foley (R)	Shane Osborn (R)	49NP (30R, 17D, 2I)	Ben Nelson (D)	Chuck Hagel (R)	3R	4 – McCain/ Palin (R) ✗ 1 – Obama/ Biden (D) ✓ (Note: McCain and Palin received the state's two at-large votes and one vote each in the First and Third Congressional Districts while Obama and Biden received one vote in the Second District.)
2009	Dave Heineman (R)	Rick Sheehy (R)	John A. Gale (R)	Jon Bruning (R)	Mike Foley (R)	Shane Osborn (R)	49NP (31R, 18D)	Ben Nelson (D)	Mike Johanns (R)	3R	4 – McCain/ Palin (R) ✗ 1 – Obama/ Biden (D) ✓
2010	Dave Heineman (R)	Rick Sheehy (R)	John A. Gale (R)	Jon Bruning (R)	Mike Foley (R)	Shane Osborn (R)	49NP (30R, 19D)	Ben Nelson (D)	Mike Johanns (R)	3R	4 – McCain/ Palin (R) ✗ 1 – Obama/ Biden (D) ✓
2011	Dave Heineman (R)	Rick Sheehy (R)	John A. Gale (R)	Jon Bruning (R)	Mike Foley (R)	Don Stenberg (R)	49NP (32R, 17D)	Ben Nelson (D)	Mike Johanns (R)	3R	4 – McCain/ Palin (R) ✗ 1 – Obama/ Biden (D) ✓
2012	Dave Heineman (R)	Rick Sheehy (R)	John A. Gale (R)	Jon Bruning (R)	Mike Foley (R)	Don Stenberg (R)	49NP (32R, 17D)	Ben Nelson (D)	Mike Johanns (R)	3R	Romney/ Ryan (R) ✗
2013	Dave Heineman (R)	Lavon Heidemann (R)	John A. Gale (R)	Jon Bruning (R)	Mike Foley (R)	Don Stenberg (R)	49NP (29R, 19D, 1I)	Deb Fischer (R)	Mike Johanns (R)	3R	Romney/ Ryan (R) ✗
2014	Dave Heineman (R)	Lavon Heidemann (R)	John A. Gale (R)	Jon Bruning (R)	Mike Foley (R)	Don Stenberg (R)	49NP (29R, 19D, 1I)	Deb Fischer (R)	Mike Johanns (R)	3R	Romney/ Ryan (R) ✗
2014	Dave Heineman (R)	John E. Nelson (R)	John A. Gale (R)	Jon Bruning (R)	Mike Foley (R)	Don Stenberg (R)	49NP (29R, 19D, 1I)	Deb Fischer (R)	Mike Johanns (R)	3R	Romney/ Ryan (R) ✗
2015	Pete Ricketts (R)	Mike Foley (R)	John A. Gale (R)	Doug Peterson (R)	Charlie Janssen (R)	Don Stenberg (R)	49NP (34R, 14D, 1I)	Deb Fischer (R)	Ben Sasse (R)	2R, 1D	Romney/ Ryan (R) ✗
2016	Pete Ricketts (R)	Mike Foley (R)	John A. Gale (R)	Doug Peterson (R)	Charlie Janssen (R)	Don Stenberg (R)	49NP (35R, 13D, 1I)	Deb Fischer (R)	Ben Sasse (R)	2R, 1D	Trump/ Pence (R) ✓
2017	Pete Ricketts (R)	Mike Foley (R)	John A. Gale (R)	Doug Peterson (R)	Charlie Janssen (R)	Don Stenberg (R)	49NP (31R, 16D, 1L, 1I)	Deb Fischer (R)	Ben Sasse (R)	3R	Trump/ Pence (R) ✓
2018	Pete Ricketts (R)	Mike Foley (R)	John A. Gale (R)	Doug Peterson (R)	Charlie Janssen (R)	Don Stenberg (R)	49NP (31R, 16D, 1L, 1I)	Deb Fischer (R)	Ben Sasse (R)	3R	Trump/ Pence (R) ✓
2019	Pete Ricketts (R)	Mike Foley (R)	Bob Evnen (R)	Doug Peterson (R)	Charlie Janssen (R)	John Murante (R) (Note: Resigned on September 18, 2023 to lead the Nebraska Public Employees Retirement Systems.)	49NP (30R, 18D, 1I)	Deb Fischer (R)	Ben Sasse (R)	3R	Trump/ Pence (R) ✓
2020	Pete Ricketts (R)	Mike Foley (R)	Bob Evnen (R)	Doug Peterson (R)	Charlie Janssen (R)	John Murante (R)	49NP (30R, 18D, 1I)	Deb Fischer (R)	Ben Sasse (R)	3R	4 – Trump/ Pence (R) ✗ 1 – Biden/ Harris (D) ✓ (Note: Trump and Pence received the state's two at-large votes and one vote each in the First and Third Congressional Districts while Biden and Harris received one vote in the Second District.)
2021	Pete Ricketts (R)	Mike Foley (R)	Bob Evnen (R)	Doug Peterson (R)	Charlie Janssen (R)	John Murante (R)	49NP (32R, 17D)	Deb Fischer (R)	Ben Sasse (R)	3R	4 – Trump/ Pence (R) ✗ 1 – Biden/ Harris (D) ✓
2022	Pete Ricketts (R)	Mike Foley (R)	Bob Evnen (R)	Doug Peterson (R)	Charlie Janssen (R)	John Murante (R)	49NP (32R, 17D)	Deb Fischer (R)	Ben Sasse (R)	3R	4 – Trump/ Pence (R) ✗ 1 – Biden/ Harris (D) ✓
2023	Jim Pillen (R)	Joe Kelly (R)	Bob Evnen (R)	Mike Hilgers (R)	Mike Foley (R)	John Murante (R)	49NP (32R, 17D)	Deb Fischer (R)	Pete Ricketts (R)	3R	4 – Trump/ Pence (R) ✗ 1 – Biden/ Harris (D) ✓
2023	Jim Pillen (R)	Joe Kelly (R)	Bob Evnen (R)	Mike Hilgers (R)	Mike Foley (R)	Tom Briese (R)	49NP (32R, 16D, 1I)	Deb Fischer (R)	Pete Ricketts (R)	3R	4 – Trump/ Pence (R) ✗ 1 – Biden/ Harris (D) ✓
2024	Jim Pillen (R)	Joe Kelly (R)	Bob Evnen (R)	Mike Hilgers (R)	Mike Foley (R)	Tom Briese (R)	49NP (32R, 16D, 1I)	Deb Fischer (R)	Pete Ricketts (R)	3R	4 – Trump/ Vance (R) ✓ 1 – Harris/ Walz (D) ✗ (Note: Trump and Vance received the state's two at-large votes and one vote each in the First and Third Congressional Districts while Harris and Walz received one vote in the Second District.)
2024	Jim Pillen (R)	Joe Kelly (R)	Bob Evnen (R)	Mike Hilgers (R)	Mike Foley (R)	Tom Briese (R)	49NP (33R, 15D, 1I)	Deb Fischer (R)	Pete Ricketts (R)	3R	4 – Trump/ Vance (R) ✓ 1 – Harris/ Walz (D) ✗
2025	Jim Pillen (R)	Joe Kelly (R)	Bob Evnen (R)	Mike Hilgers (R)	Mike Foley (R)	Tom Briese (R)	49NP (33R, 15D, 1I)	Deb Fischer (R)	Pete Ricketts (R)	3R	4 – Trump/ Vance (R) ✓ 1 – Harris/ Walz (D) ✗
2026	Jim Pillen (R)	Joe Kelly (R)	Bob Evnen (R)	Mike Hilgers (R)	Mike Foley (R)	Joey Spellerberg (R)	49NP (33R, 15D, 1I)	Deb Fischer (R)	Pete Ricketts (R)	3R	4 – Trump/ Vance (R) ✓ 1 – Harris/ Walz (D) ✗
2027	Jim Pillen (R)	Joe Kelly (R)	Scott Petersen	Mike Hilgers (R)	Mike Foley (R)	Joey Spellerberg (R)	49NP (30R, 18D, 1I)	Deb Fischer (R)	Pete Ricketts (R)	2R, 1D	4 – Trump/ Vance (R) ✓ 1 – Harris/ Walz (D) ✗

Key to party colors and abbreviations for members of the U.S. Congress and other politicians or officials
Alaskan Independence (AKIP) Know Nothing (KN) American Labor (AL) Anti-Jacksonian (Anti-J); National Republican (NR) Anti-Administration (AA) Anti-Masonic (Anti-M) Conservative (Con) Covenant (Cov)	Democratic (D) Democratic–Farmer–Labor (DFL) Democratic–NPL (D-NPL) Dixiecrat (Dix), States' Rights (SR) Democratic-Republican (DR) Farmer–Labor (FL) Federalist (F); Pro-Administration (PA)	Free Soil (FS) Fusion (Fus) Greenback (GB) Independence (IPM) Jacksonian (J) Liberal (Lib) Libertarian (L) National Union (NU)	Nonpartisan League (NPL) Nullifier (N) Opposition Northern (O); Opposition Southern (O) Populist (Pop) Progressive (Prog) Prohibition (Proh) Readjuster (Rea)	Republican (R) Silver (Sv) Silver Republican (SvR) Socialist (Soc) Union (U) Unconditional Union (UU) Vermont Progressive (VP) Whig (W)	Independent (I) Nonpartisan (NP)

== See also ==
- Politics in Nebraska
