= 1902 Nebraska lieutenant gubernatorial election =

- November 4, 1902

Nominee	Edmund G. McGilton	Edward A. Gilbert
Party	Republican	Populist
Alliance		Democratic
Popular vote	98,320	87,009
Percentage	51.0%	45.1%
Lieutenant Governor before election
Calvin F. Steele (acting)
Republican
Elected Lieutenant Governor
Edmund G. McGilton
Republican

The 1902 Nebraska lieutenant gubernatorial election was held on November 4, 1902, and featured Republican nominee Edmund G. McGilton defeating Edward A. Gilbert, the Populist and Democratic fusion nominee, as well as Prohibition nominee Isaiah Lightner and Socialist nominee Andrew D. Peugh. (Note: Several sources, including various newspapers from the time period, refer to Peugh as "A. David Pugh" instead of "Andrew D. Peugh." However, the name "Andrew D. Peugh" is also widely used in newspaper sources and is the name given in the official results in the 1903 Senate Journal of the Legislature of the State of Nebraska.)

On May 1, 1901, after serving only four months as Governor of Nebraska, Charles H. Dietrich resigned from being governor as he had been elected by the Nebraska Legislature to fill the vacant U.S. Senate term of Monroe L. Hayward, who had died. Thus, Ezra P. Savage, the lieutenant governor elected in 1900, became the Governor of Nebraska.

After the elevation of Savage to Governor, Calvin F. Steele was considered the Acting Lieutenant Governor due to his position as president pro tempore of the Nebraska Senate based on Article V, Section 18, of the Nebraska Constitution. Thus, in the 1915 Nebraska Blue Book and the 1918 Nebraska Blue Book, Steele is listed as having served as lieutenant governor, even replacing any mention of Savage's brief stint as lieutenant governor. Neither Savage nor Steele sought the office of lieutenant governor in 1902.

== General election ==
=== Candidates ===
- Edward A. Gilbert, Populist/Democratic fusion candidate, former Nebraska Lieutenant Governor from 1899 to 1901 from York, Nebraska, who was aligned with the Silver Republican Party
- Isaiah Lightner, Prohibition candidate, farmer from Monroe, Nebraska, and president of the Monroe Agricultural Society
- Edmund G. McGilton, Republican candidate, lawyer from Omaha, Nebraska, who was an unsuccessful Republican nominee for University of Nebraska Board of Regents in 1900
- Andrew D. Peugh, Socialist candidate from Fairfield, Nebraska

=== Results ===
Nebraska lieutenant gubernatorial election, 1902
Party	Candidate	Votes	%
Republican	Edmund G. McGilton	98,320	50.96
Populist	Edward A. Gilbert	87,009	45.10
Prohibition	Isaiah Lightner	4,129	2.14
Socialist	Andrew D. Peugh	3,482	1.80
Total votes		192,940	100.00
Republican hold			

== See also ==
- 1902 Nebraska gubernatorial election
