= 1900 Nebraska lieutenant gubernatorial election =

- November 6, 1900
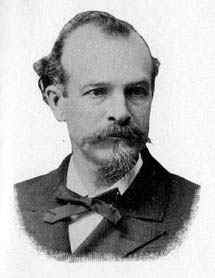

Nominee	Ezra P. Savage	Edward A. Gilbert
Party	Republican	Populist
Alliance		Democratic
Popular vote	114,082	111,280
Percentage	49.3%	48.1%
Lieutenant Governor before election
Edward A. Gilbert
Populist
Elected Lieutenant Governor
Ezra P. Savage
Republican

The 1900 Nebraska lieutenant gubernatorial election was held on November 6, 1900, and featured Republican nominee Ezra P. Savage defeating incumbent Nebraska Lieutenant Governor Edward A. Gilbert, the Populist and Democratic fusion nominee. Other candidates who received two percent of the vote or less included Prohibition nominee Charles R. Lawson, Midroad Populist nominee Herman G. Reiter, and Social Democratic nominee David McKibben.

== General election ==
=== Candidates ===
- Edward A. Gilbert, Populist/Democratic fusion candidate, incumbent Nebraska Lieutenant Governor from York, Nebraska, who was aligned with the Silver Republican Party
- Charles R. Lawson, Prohibition candidate from Santee, Nebraska
- David McKibben, Social Democratic candidate from Giltner, Nebraska. The Social Democratic Party was recognized as a socialist party and was a precursor to the Socialist Party of America.
- Herman G. Reiter, Midroad Populist candidate from Prairie Center in Buffalo County, Nebraska, nominated by the Midroad Populist convention which objected to fusion with the Democrats.
- Ezra P. Savage, Republican candidate, businessman, farmer, banker, former member of the Nebraska House of Representatives from 1883 to 1885 from Sargent, Nebraska, and first mayor of South Omaha, Nebraska, in 1887

=== Results ===
Nebraska lieutenant gubernatorial election, 1900
Party	Candidate	Votes	%
Republican	Ezra P. Savage	114,082	49.27
Populist	Edward A. Gilbert (incumbent)	111,280	48.06
Prohibition	Charles R. Lawson	4,020	1.74
Midroad-Populist	Herman G. Reiter	1,306	0.56
Social Democratic	David McKibben	848	0.37
Total votes		231,536	100.00
Republican gain from Populist			

== Aftermath ==
On May 1, 1901, after serving only four months as Governor of Nebraska, Charles H. Dietrich resigned from being governor as he had been elected by the Nebraska Legislature to fill the vacant U.S. Senate term of Monroe L. Hayward, who had died. Thus, Ezra P. Savage, the lieutenant governor elected in 1900, became the Governor of Nebraska. After the elevation of Savage to Governor, Calvin F. Steele was considered the Acting Lieutenant Governor due to his position as president pro tempore of the Nebraska Senate based on Article V, Section 18, of the Nebraska Constitution. Thus, in the 1915 Nebraska Blue Book and the 1918 Nebraska Blue Book, Steele is listed as having served as lieutenant governor, even replacing any mention of Savage's brief stint as lieutenant governor.

== See also ==
- 1900 Nebraska gubernatorial election
