= 1898 Nebraska lieutenant gubernatorial election =

- November 8, 1898

Nominee	Edward A. Gilbert	George A. Murphy
Party	Populist	Republican
Alliance	Democratic
Popular vote	94,850	92,150
Percentage	50.2%	48.8%
Lieutenant Governor before election
James E. Harris
Populist
Elected Lieutenant Governor
Edward A. Gilbert
Populist

The 1898 Nebraska lieutenant gubernatorial election was held on November 8, 1898, and featured Populist and Democratic fusion nominee Edward A. Gilbert defeating Republican nominee George A. Murphy as well as Prohibition nominee Newell S. Lowrie and Socialist Labor nominee J. J. Kerrigan.

Early in 1898, there was speculation that incumbent Nebraska Lieutenant Governor James E. Harris might seek the office of Governor of Nebraska in the 1898 election; however, by the fall of 1898, Harris was not running for governor and had become disaffected with the Populist party. Harris eventually withdrew from being renominated for the office of lieutenant governor in favor of Edward A. Gilbert so that the Silver Republican Party, who supported Gilbert, might have some representation on the Populist/Democratic fusion ticket.

A party calling itself the Liberty Party held a convention on August 2, 1898, and had originally nominated candidates for governor and lieutenant governor. The nominees were Richard A. Hawley for governor, who had previously run for governor with the so-called National Party in the election of 1896, and J. Phipps Roe, of Omaha, Nebraska, for lieutenant governor. However, on September 22, both candidates withdrew their names and the Liberty Party decided to endorse the Populist/Democratic fusion candidates, William A. Poynter and Edward A. Gilbert, for governor and lieutenant governor respectively.

== General election ==
=== Candidates ===
- Edward A. Gilbert, Populist/Democratic fusion candidate, former member of the Nebraska House of Representatives as a Republican from 1889 to 1891 from York, Nebraska, who was aligned with the Silver Republican Party
- J. J. Kerrigan, Socialist Labor candidate from Omaha, Nebraska
- Rev. Newell Samuel Lowrie, Prohibition candidate, Presbyterian minister from O'Neill, Nebraska
- George Arthur Murphy, Republican candidate, lawyer, member of the Nebraska Senate since 1897 from Beatrice, Nebraska, and former city attorney of Beatrice and prosecuting attorney of Gage County

=== Results ===
Nebraska lieutenant gubernatorial election, 1898
Party	Candidate	Votes	%
Populist	Edward A. Gilbert (Note: Cross-endorsed by a party calling itself the Liberty Party)	94,850	50.18
Republican	George A. Murphy	92,150	48.75
Prohibition	Newell S. Lowrie	1,778	0.94
Socialist Labor	J. J. Kerrigan	254	0.13
Total votes		189,032	100.00
Populist hold			

== See also ==
- 1898 Nebraska gubernatorial election
