= 1898 Nebraska gubernatorial election =

- November 8, 1898
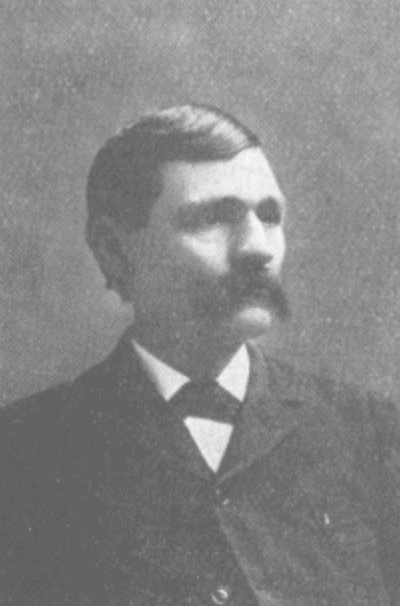

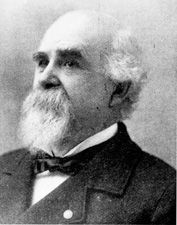
Nominee	William A. Poynter	Monroe Hayward
Party	Populist	Republican
Alliance	Democratic
Popular vote	95,703	92,982
Percentage	50.19%	48.77%
- County results Poynter: 40–50% 50–60% 60–70% 70–80% Hayward: 40–50% 50–60% 60–70%
Governor before election
Silas A. Holcomb
Populist
Elected Governor
William A. Poynter
Populist

The 1898 Nebraska gubernatorial election was held on November 8, 1898. Incumbent Populist Governor Silas A. Holcomb did not stand for re-election. Populist and Democratic fusion nominee William A. Poynter defeated Republican nominee Monroe Hayward with 50.19% of the vote.

A party calling itself the Liberty Party held a convention on August 2, 1898, and had originally nominated candidates for governor and lieutenant governor. The nominees were Richard A. Hawley for governor, who had previously run for governor with the so-called National Party in the election of 1896, and J. Phipps Roe, of Omaha, Nebraska, for lieutenant governor. However, on September 22, both candidates withdrew their names and the Liberty Party decided to endorse the Populist/Democratic fusion candidates, William A. Poynter and Edward A. Gilbert, for governor and lieutenant governor respectively.

== General election ==
=== Candidates ===
Major party candidates

- William A. Poynter, People's Independent, Democratic and Silver Republican fusion candidate, former President Pro Tempore of the Nebraska Senate, Populist candidate for Nebraska's 3rd congressional district in 1892. The Democratic state convention first nominated Constantine Joseph Smyth, who declined the nomination, then Edgar Howard, before nominating Poynter who had already been nominated by the Populist and Silver Republican parties.
- Monroe Hayward, Republican, former district court judge

Other candidates

- Robert Valentine Muir, Prohibition
- Dr. H. S. Aley, Socialist Labor

=== Results ===
1898 Nebraska gubernatorial election
Party	Candidate	Votes	%
Populist	William A. Poynter (Note: Cross-endorsed by a party calling itself the Liberty Party)	95,703	50.19%
Republican	Monroe Hayward	92,982	48.77%
Prohibition	Robert V. Muir	1,724	0.90%
Socialist Labor	H. S. Aley	248	0.13%
Scattering		11	0.01%
Majority		2,721	1.43%
Turnout		190,668	
Populist hold			

== See also ==
- 1898 Nebraska lieutenant gubernatorial election
