= William V. Allen =

American politician (1847–1924)

William Vincent Allen
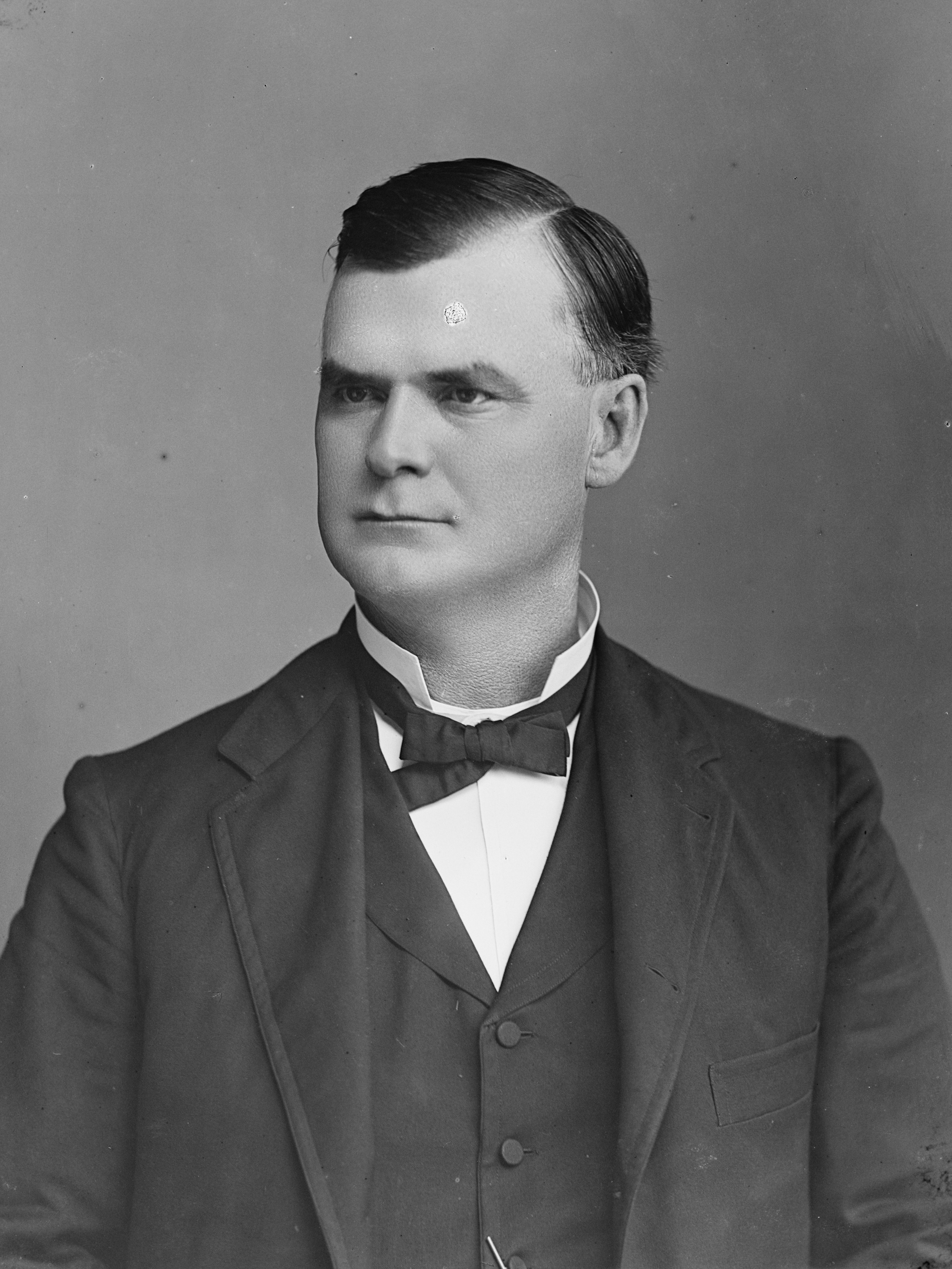
- Portrait by C. M. Bell c. 1893–1894

United States Senator from Nebraska
- In office December 13, 1899 – March 28, 1901
- Appointed by: William A. Poynter
- Preceded by: Monroe L. Hayward
- Succeeded by: Charles H. Dietrich
- In office March 4, 1893 – March 3, 1899
- Preceded by: Algernon S. Paddock
- Succeeded by: Monroe L. Hayward

Personal details
- Born: January 28, 1847 Midway, Ohio, U.S.
- Died: January 12, 1924 (aged 76) Los Angeles, California, U.S.
- Resting place: Crown Hill Cemetery; Madison, Nebraska, U.S.
- Party: Populist
- Occupation: Attorney, judge

William Vincent Allen (January 28, 1847 – January 12, 1924) was an American jurist and twice a U.S. Senator from Nebraska.

== Early life ==
Allen was born in Midway, Ohio. He moved with his parents to Iowa in 1857, where he attended the common schools and Upper Iowa University at Fayette, Iowa.

He married Blanche Mott, born in Tidioute, Pennsylvania, though most of her life was spent in Iowa. Her parents moved to that state when she was ten years old. Here she was educated, and married at Fayette, Iowa, to Hon. William V. Allen, May 9, 1870. Four children, three daughters (Lulu, Willa and Edith) and one son.

He served as a private with the 32nd Iowa Volunteer Infantry Regiment during the Civil War.

== Political and legal career ==
He then studied law at West Union, Iowa and was admitted to the bar in 1869. Allen practiced in Iowa until 1884 when he moved to Madison, Nebraska. He served as judge of the district court of the ninth judicial district of Nebraska from 1891 to 1893.

Allen was the permanent chairman of the Populist State conventions in 1892, 1894 and 1896. Allen was elected as a Populist to the United States Senate by the Nebraska State Legislature and served from March 4, 1893, to March 3, 1899. During his term, he served as the chairman of the Committee on Forest Reservations and Game Protection (Fifty-fourth and Fifty-fifth Congresses). Allen championed various bills for public buildings and drought relief along the Missouri River Valley and authored the bill that would establish the 1898 Trans-Mississippi Exposition in Omaha, Nebraska.

Allen was an unsuccessful candidate for reelection in 1899. After that, he was appointed and subsequently elected judge of the district court of the ninth judicial district of Nebraska and served from March 9, 1899, to December 1899, when he resigned to return to the Senate, because he was appointed to fill the vacancy caused by the death of his successor, Monroe L. Hayward. He served from December 13, 1899, to March 28, 1901, when a successor was elected; he was not a candidate for election to the vacancy.

Allen then resumed the practice of law in Madison, where he was again elected judge of the district court of the ninth judicial district of Nebraska in 1917 and served until his death.

== Committee assignments ==
At various times during his tenure as a United States Senator, Allen served on 10 standing committees and 3 select or special committees. During his first term in the Senate, he chaired the Select Committee on Forest Reservations, and retained his chairmanship when the committee became the standing Committee on Forest Reservations and the Protection of Game during the 54th Congress. When he returned to the Senate for his second term during the 56th Congress, he was again appointed to this committee, but did not serve as chairman.

Committee	Congresses	Notes
Forest Reservations (Select); Forest Reservations and the Protection of Game	53rd 54th – 56th	Chairman (53rd – 55th); Renamed and made a standing committee in the 54th Congress
Claims	53rd – 56th	
Indian Affairs	53rd – 55th	
Public Lands	53rd – 55th	
Transportation Routes to the Seaboard	54th – 55th	
Privileges and Elections	55th	
Agriculture and Forestry	56th	
Interstate Commerce	56th	
Pensions	56th	
The Philippines	56th	
Transportation and Sale of Meat Products (Select)	53rd – 55th	
Investigate Attempts at Bribery, etc. (Special)	53rd	

== Death ==
He died in Los Angeles, California on January 12, 1924, and was interred in Crown Hill Cemetery at Madison, Nebraska.

== Works ==
- "Necessity of the People's Party," The Arena, vol. 30, no. 4 (Oct. 1903), pp. 410–414.

U.S. Senate
Preceded by Algernon S. Paddock	U.S. senator (Class 1) from Nebraska; 1893–1899; Served alongside: Charles F. Manderson, John M. Thurston	Succeeded by Monroe L. Hayward
Preceded by Monroe L. Hayward	U.S. senator (Class 1) from Nebraska; 1899–1901; Served alongside: John M. Thurston, Joseph H. Millard	Succeeded by Charles H. Dietrich
