= 1900 Nebraska gubernatorial election =

- November 6, 1900
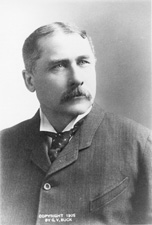

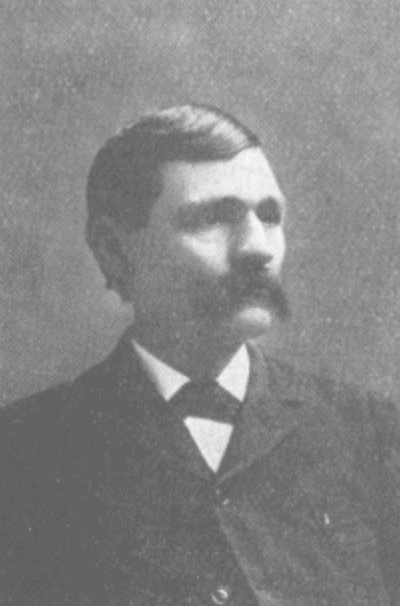
Nominee	Charles Henry Dietrich	William A. Poynter
Party	Republican	Populist
Alliance		Democratic
Popular vote	113,879	113,018
Percentage	48.88%	48.51%
- County results Dietrich: 40–50% 50–60% 60–70% Poynter: 40–50% 50–60% 60–70%
Governor before election
William A. Poynter
Populist
Elected Governor
Charles Henry Dietrich
Republican

The 1900 Nebraska gubernatorial election was held on November 6, 1900.

Incumbent Populist and Democratic fusion Governor William A. Poynter was defeated for re-election by Republican nominee Charles Henry Dietrich.

== General election ==
=== Candidates ===
Major party candidates

- William A. Poynter, People's Independent and Democratic fusion candidate, Incumbent Governor
- Charles Henry Dietrich, Republican, banker

Other candidates

- Lucius O. Jones, Prohibition candidate, businessman, banker, prominent member of the Methodist church, and Prohibition nominee for lieutenant governor in 1896 from Lincoln, Nebraska
- Taylor Flick, Midroad Populist, former member of the Kansas Legislature. Flick was nominated by a Midroad Populist convention which objected to fusion with the Democrats.
- Prof. Theodore Kharas, Social Democrat

=== Results ===
1900 Nebraska gubernatorial election
Party	Candidate	Votes	%
Republican	Charles Henry Dietrich	113,879	48.88%
Populist	William A. Poynter (incumbent)	113,018 (Note: Dubin gives Poynter's vote as 113,048.)	48.51%
Prohibition	Lucius O. Jones	4,315	1.85%
Midroad-Populist	Taylor Flick	1,095	0.47%
Social Democratic	Theodore Kharas	674	0.29%
Majority		861	0.37%
Turnout		232,981	
Republican gain from Populist			

== See also ==
- 1900 Nebraska lieutenant gubernatorial election
