= Governor Holcomb =

Governor Holcomb may refer to:

- Eric Holcomb (born 1968), 51st Governor of Indiana
- Marcus H. Holcomb (1844–1932), 66th Governor of Connecticut
- Silas A. Holcomb (1858–1920), 9th Governor of Nebraska
