= 1896 Nebraska lieutenant gubernatorial election =

- November 3, 1896

| Nominee | James E. Harris | Orlando Tefft |
| Party | Populist | Republican |
| Alliance | Democratic |
| Popular vote | 111,729 | 95,757 |
| Percentage | 51.7% | 44.3% |
Lieutenant Governor before election
Robert E. Moore
Republican
Elected Lieutenant Governor
James E. Harris
Populist

The 1896 Nebraska lieutenant gubernatorial election was held on November 3, 1896, and featured Populist and Democratic fusion nominee James E. Harris defeating his major rival, Republican nominee Orlando Tefft. Other candidates who received two percent of the vote or less included Gold Democratic nominee Owen F. Biglin, Prohibition nominee Lucius O. Jones, Socialist Labor nominee Fred Herman, and National Silver nominee Oscar Kent. Incumbent Nebraska Lieutenant Governor Robert E. Moore did not seek reelection.

With the victory of Populist/Democratic fusion candidate James E. Harris, this election became the first Nebraska lieutenant gubernatorial election in which a candidate affiliated with a party other than the Republican Party won the office of lieutenant governor. The success of the Populist/Democratic fusion candidates was helped in part by the popularity of William Jennings Bryan, a Nebraskan running for president on the Populist/Democratic ticket.

== General election ==
=== Candidates ===
- Owen F. Biglin, Nebraska Gold Democratic candidate, former candidate for Holt County Treasurer from O'Neill, Nebraska
- James E. Harris, Populist/Democratic fusion candidate, farmer, preacher, and former member of the Nebraska Senate from 1893 to 1895 from Talmage, Nebraska
- Fred Herman, Socialist Labor Party candidate from Lincoln, Nebraska
- Lucius Orville Jones, Prohibition Party candidate, businessman, banker, and prominent member of the Methodist church from Lincoln, Nebraska
- Oscar Kent, National Silver Party candidate, from Kenesaw, Nebraska
- Orlando Tefft, Republican candidate, businessman, banker, and member of the Nebraska Senate since 1893 and previously from 1879 to 1883 from Avoca, Nebraska

=== Results ===
Nebraska lieutenant gubernatorial election, 1896
| Party | Candidate | Votes | % |
|---|---|---|---|
| Populist | James E. Harris | 111,729 | 51.71 |
| Republican | Orlando Tefft | 95,757 | 44.32 |
| National Democratic | Owen F. Biglin | 4,431 | 2.05 |
| Prohibition | Lucius O. Jones | 2,458 | 1.14 |
| Socialist Labor | Fred Herman | 875 | 0.40 |
| Silver | Oscar Kent | 810 | 0.37 |
| Total votes | | 216,060 | 100.00 |
| Populist gain from Republican | | | |

== See also ==
- 1896 Nebraska gubernatorial election
