= 1902 Nebraska gubernatorial election =

- November 4, 1902
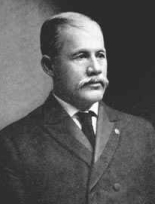

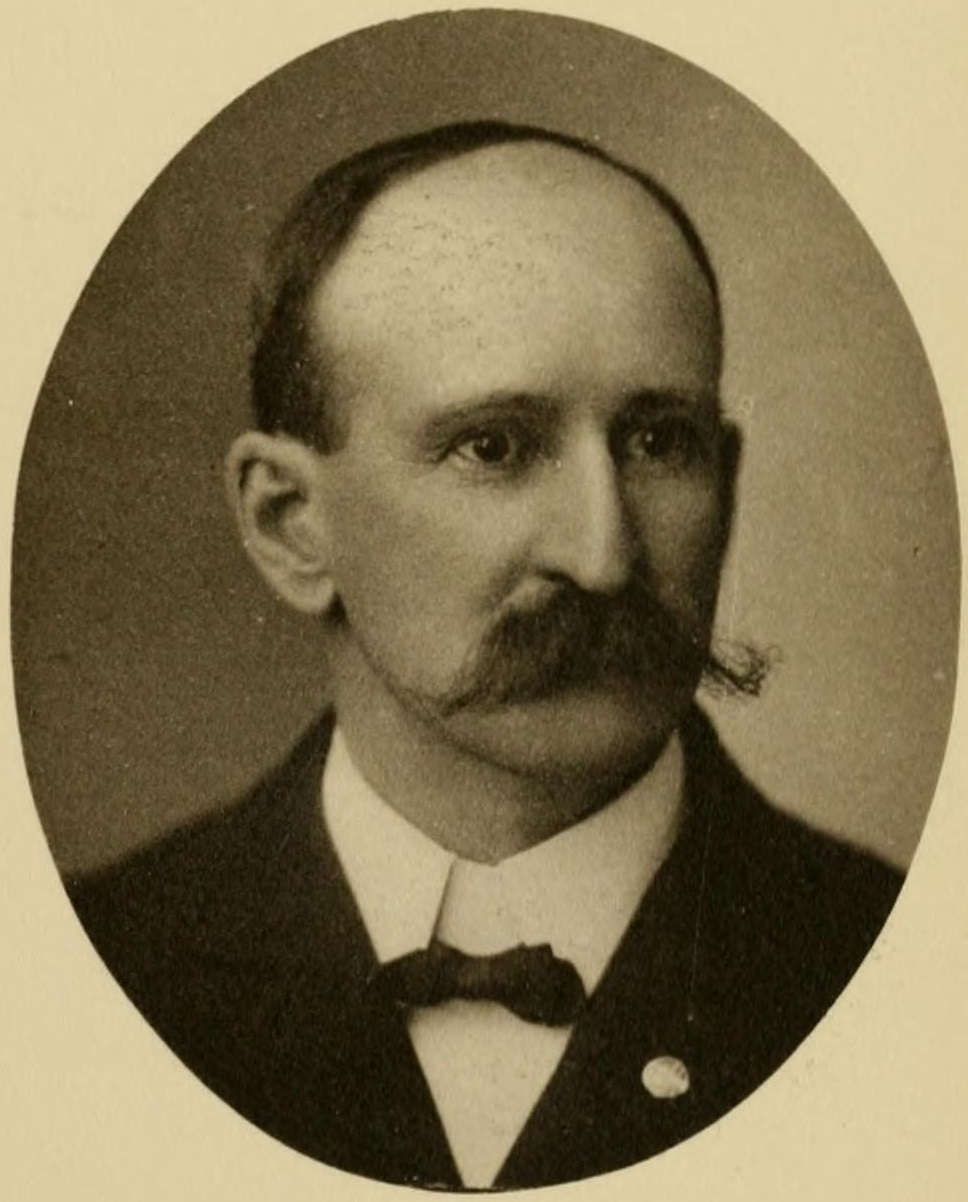
Nominee	John H. Mickey	William Henry Thompson
Party	Republican	Populist
Alliance		Democratic
Popular vote	96,471	91,116
Percentage	49.69%	46.93%
- County results Mickey: 40–50% 50–60% 60–70% Thompson: 40–50% 50–60% 60–70% Tie: 40–50%
Governor before election
Ezra P. Savage
Republican
Elected Governor
John H. Mickey
Republican

The 1902 Nebraska gubernatorial election was held on November 4, 1902. Republican nominee John H. Mickey defeated Democratic and Populist fusion nominee William Henry Thompson with 49.69% of the vote.

Incumbent Republican Governor Ezra P. Savage did not stand for re-election. Savage originally intended to run for a second term as governor, but the criticism which was caused by his parole and pardon of former State Treasurer Bartley, who was serving a prison sentence for embezzlement, influenced his decision to step down from the race.

== General election ==
=== Candidates ===
Major party candidates

- William Henry Thompson, Democratic and People's Independent fusion candidate, former Mayor of Grand Island, Nebraska, Fusion candidate for U. S. Senate in 1901
- John H. Mickey, Republican, former member of the Nebraska House of Representatives

Other candidates

- Samuel T. Davies, Prohibition, Prohibition candidate for Nebraska's 1st congressional district in 1900
- George E. Bigelow, Socialist, Prohibition candidate for Governor in 1888

=== Results ===
1902 Nebraska gubernatorial election (Note: OurCampaigns gives Bigelow's vote as 3,757.)
Party	Candidate	Votes	%
Republican	John H. Mickey	96,471	49.69%
Populist	William Henry Thompson	91,116	46.93%
Prohibition	Samuel T. Davies	3,397	1.75%
Socialist	George E. Bigelow	3,157	1.63%
Scattering		2	0.00%
Majority		5,355	2.76%
Turnout		194,143	
Republican hold			

== See also ==
- 1902 Nebraska lieutenant gubernatorial election
