= United States Senate Committee on the Philippines =

The Committee on the Philippines was a standing committee of the United States Senate from 1899 to 1921. The committee was established by Senate resolution on December 15, 1899, to oversee administration of the Philippines, which Spain had ceded to the United States as part of the settlement of the Spanish–American War. The committee was established by Senate resolution on December 15, 1899, even though the peace treaty signed in Paris on December 10, 1898, had not yet been ratified. In 1921, the committee was terminated and jurisdiction over legislative matters concerning the Philippines was transferred to the newly created Committee on Territories and Insular Possessions.

== History ==
At the time of the creation of the committee, the Philippines were in a state of civil turmoil that greatly concerned the Senate, where a debate raged between those who wished to extend U.S. sovereignty over the Filipinos and the anti-imperialists. Like the Committee on the Pacific Islands and Puerto Rico, the Committee on the Philippines focused on primarily on legal and economic matters, such as Philippine independence, administration of the islands by the Taft Commission, and trade issues. Matters relating to the suppression of the Philippine insurrection were often referred to the Senate Foreign Relations Committee.

=== Chairmen ===
- Henry Cabot Lodge (R-MA) 1899-1911
- Simon Guggenheim (R-CO) 1911-1913
- Gilbert M. Hitchcock (D-NE) 1913-1918
- John F. Shafroth (D-CO) 1918-1919
- Warren Harding (R-OH) 1919-1921

== Lodge Committee ==
Henry Cabot Lodge, Republican of Massachusetts, was the committee's first chairman, serving until 1911. During this time, the committee was informally known as the Lodge Committee. In 1902, under Chairman Lodge, the committee carried out an investigation into allegations of war crimes in the Philippine–American War. The hearings commenced on January 31, 1902 and adjourned on June 28, 1902. They were closed to the public, except for three press associations. The final report came to 3,000 pages.

A remark to a Manila News reporter by newly promoted Brigadier General Jacob H. Smith on November 4, 1901, triggered the hearings, which eventually led to Smith's own court-martial and conviction. Smith said that he intended to set the entire island of Samar ablaze, and would likely wipe out most of the population.

Senator George Frisbie Hoar had been demanding an investigation after increasing evidence of U.S. military war crimes in the Philippine–American War. Hoar introduced a resolution to establish a select committee to conduct the investigation on January 13, 1902. However, Chairman Lodge argued that the hearings would be better conducted by the existing Committee on the Philippines. Anti-imperialists in the Senate feared a whitewash, because Lodge had been avoiding investigating mounting allegations of war crimes so much so that the U.S. Senate Committee on the Philippines had been inactive for several months.

=== Members, 1902 ===
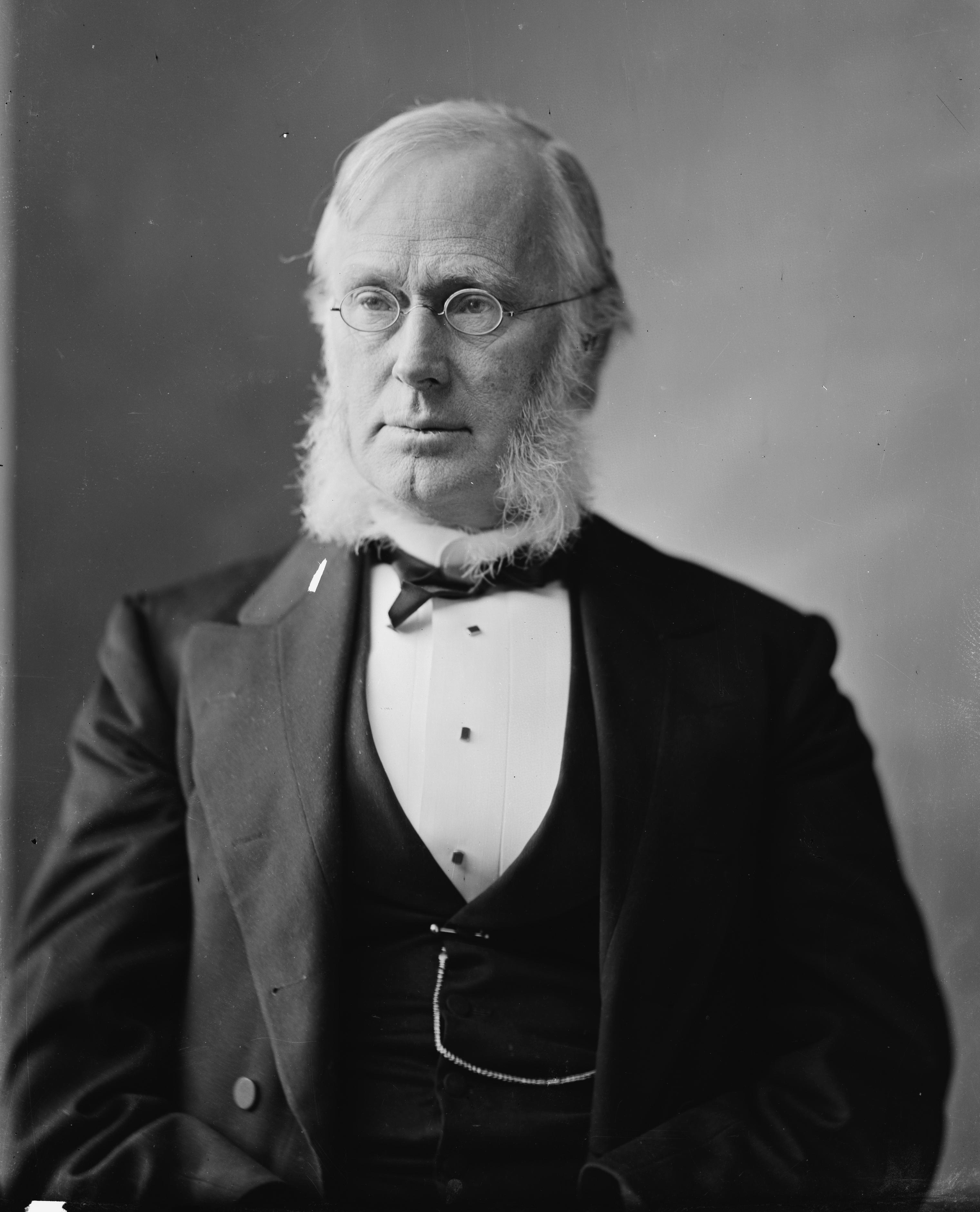
George Frisbie Hoar

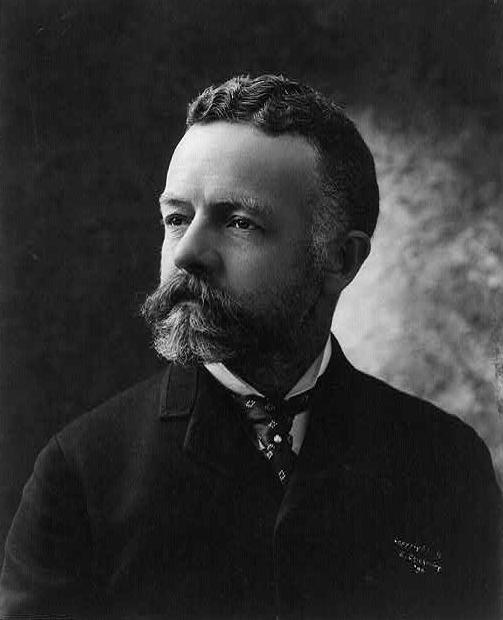
Henry Cabot Lodge

During the time of the committee investigation, the minority on the committee consisted of Democratic and Republican anti-imperialists, led by Senator Hoar, while the majority was dominated by imperialists, led by Chairman Lodge. Hearings often degenerated into shouting matches between the imperialists and anti-imperialists. Nothing came of the hearings.

Majority (imperialists)	Minority (anti-imperialists)
Henry Cabot Lodge, Chairman, Massachusetts; Albert J. Beveridge, Indiana; Redfield Proctor, Vermont; William Boyd Allison, Iowa; Charles Henry Dietrich, Nebraska; Louis Emory McComas, Maryland; Julius Caesar Burrows, Michigan	George Frisbie Hoar, Massachusetts; Charles Allen Culberson, Texas, Thomas MacDonald Patterson, Colorado; Joseph Lafayette Rawlins, Utah; Edward Ward Carmack, Tennessee; Eugene Hale, Maine

Eugene Hale was the only other Republican to vote with Hoar against the Treaty of Paris.

== Investigation ==
=== Initial hearings ===
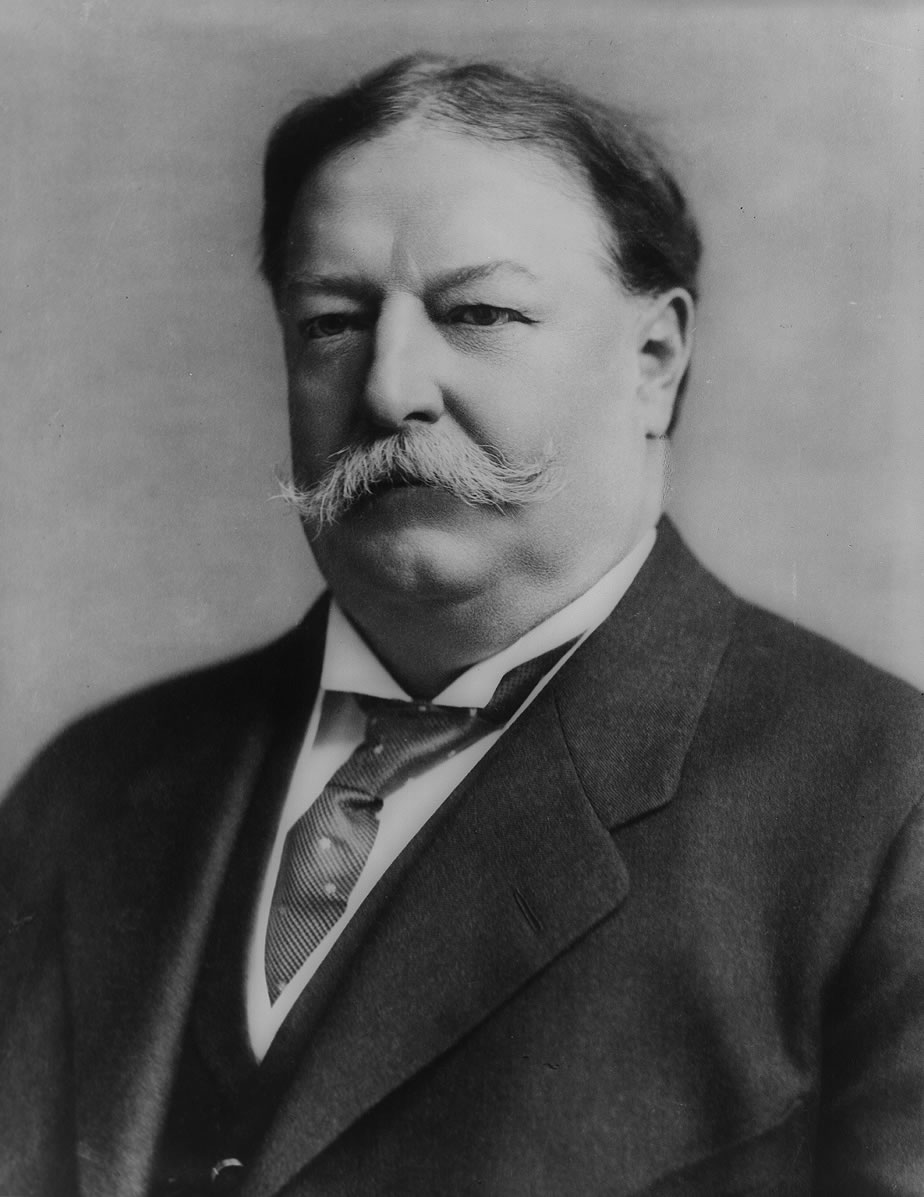
William Howard Taft

Governor William Howard Taft had arrived in the Philippines in June 1900 with the Taft Commission to set up a civilian government. Taft was the first to testify in the Lodge Committee. As a lawyer, Taft would be assumed to have been a safe witness, but he conceded under questioning that "the torturing of natives by so-called water-cure and other methods" had been used "on some occasions to extract information"..."There are some amusing instances of Filipinos who came in and said they would not say anything unless tortured; that they must have an excuse for what they proposed to say." As Miller writes, "Very few died from the water cure, a mild form of torture."

Taft was immediately followed by three pro-imperialist witnesses. General Robert P. Hughes, chief of staff to General Elwell Stephen Otis, testified for two weeks in March 1902. In his testimony, Hughes conceded that Filipino houses were burned indiscriminately as a strategy to eliminate shelters and hiding places for guerrillas and as a deterrent. During questioning, Senator Charles Dietrich followed up by asking Hughes to estimate the value of these houses. Hughes said they only took a few days to build, and cost between $1.50 and $4.00. Senator Joseph Rawlins continued the questioning:

Rawlins: If these shacks were of no consequence what was the utility of their destruction?
Hughes: The destruction was a punishment. They permitted these people to come in there and conceal themselves and they gave no sign. It is always--
Rawlins: The punishment in that case would fall, not upon the men, who could go elsewhere, but mainly upon the women and little children.
Hughes: The women and children are part of the family, and where you wish to inflict a punishment you can punish the man probably worse in that way than in any other.
Rawlins: But is that within the ordinary rules of civilized warfare? Of course you could exterminate the family which would be still worse punishment.
Hughes: These people are not civilized.
Rawlins: But is that within the ordinary rules of civilized warfare?
Hughes: No; I think it is not.
Dietrich: In order to carry on civilized warfare both sides have to engage in such warfare.
Hughes: Yes sir; certainly that is the point, I think that if I am allowed to go on I will come to a place where I shall have something to say that will bear directly on the subject.

Senator Hale commented that the war had become less and less civilized with each successive commander, to which Hughes agreed saying "from summer to summer, the conduct of the war was sterner, stiffer, as you call it."

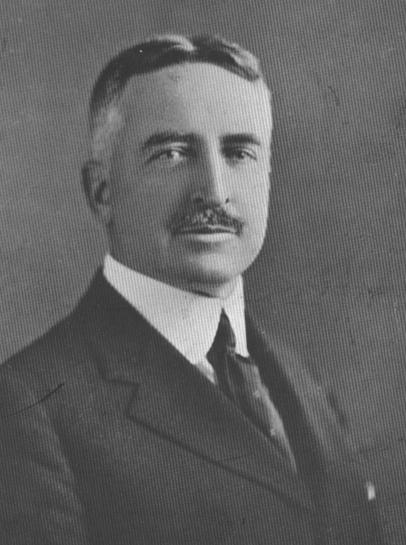
David P. Barrows

David Prescott Barrows, school director in the Philippines testified, claiming that anti-imperialist factions in the press had grossly distorted the situation. For example, concentration camps and the water cure were explained in the press as "more terrible than they are." He claimed Filipinos in the camps were "there of their own volition", for they "are pleased with it, because they are permitted to lead an easier life--much easier than at home." He went on to claim that alleged torture via the water cure "injured no one." While stating his belief that the natives had benefited from the war, Barrows stated he did not "wish to assent to the proposition that war is a good thing ... but where you have a war existing, it is, I think, better to go ahead and pursue it rigorously and finish it."

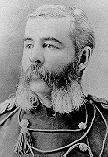
General Elwell Stephen Otis

A fourth witness, General Elwell Stephen Otis testified the week of March 20, claiming here had been no warfare in the Philippines for the past two years. Senator Hale questions that statement, saying "there have been a good many fights since." Otis alleged any such fighting was due to "robbers", and that he and his men "were laughed at by the Spaniards and European officers for the humanity that we exercised." The committee proceeded to take a two-week break before continuing with hearings.

=== Hearings continue ===
Major Cornelius Gardener, a West Point graduate serving as provincial governor of Tayabas, the province next to Batangas, submitted a report to the committee, which Chairman Lodge laid before the committee on April 10, 1902.

Of late by reason of the conduct of the troops, such as the extensive burning of the barrios in trying to lay waste the country so that the insurgents cannot occupy it, the torturing of natives by so-called water cure and other methods, in order to obtain information, the harsh treatment of natives generally, and the failure of inexperienced, lately appointed Lieutenants commanding posts, to distinguish between those who are friendly and those unfriendly and to treat every native as if he were, whether or no, an insurrecto at heart, this favorable sentiment above referred to is being fast destroyed and a deep hatred toward us engendered. The course now being pursued in this province and in the Provinces of Batangas, Laguna, and Samar is in my opinion sowing the seeds for a perpetual revolution against us hereafter whenever a good opportunity offers. Under present conditions the political situation in this province is slowly retrograding, and the American sentiment is decreasing and we are daily making permanent enemies.

The Committee on the Philippines refused to subpoena Major Cornelius Gardener in a May 1, party-line vote. Committee members Senator Thomas Patterson decried this move in a speech on the Senate floor. Senator Benjamin Tillman, a Democrat from South Carolina, similarly objected to this move, claiming information was being "smothered."

=== Emilio Aguinaldo ===
Democrats on the committee pressed Lodge to call as witnesses Emilio Aguinaldo, the Filipino general and independence leader, and several others they thought necessary for the committee to hear. In addition to Mr. Aguinaldo, Mr. Rawlings proposed calling Apolinario Mabini, one of Aguinaldo's principal advisors and Prime Minister of the declared Filipino revolutionary government; Sixto Lopez, an advocate for Philippine independence; Judge Pío del Pilar, General Torres, Howard W. Bray, an Englishman, who has spent many years in the Philippines, Robert M. Collins, and Harold Martin, both Associated Press correspondents. The committee refused this request as well as one that would have sent a subcommittee to the Philippines to collect testimony.

Instead, Mr. Lodge subpoenaed several veterans from a so-called "safe list" supplied by Secretary of War Elihu Root. However, when the soldiers appeared, they began to lecture the committee on the necessity of shooting and burning all Filipinos because of their "inability to appreciate human kindness."

Sergeant L. E. Hallock, Private William J. Gibbs, George C. Boardman, Captain Lee Hall, Richard Thomas O'Brien all testified to what they had seen during their service in the Philippines, including torture of Filipino prisoners, including use of the water cure, murder of natives, and other harassment.

Chairman Lodge countered with details of the murder of Private O'Herne. The witness said that in June 1900, O'Herne, with two other members of the company, had been sent to Iloilo for mail, and that on their return, on June 30, they were ambushed by 100 natives, and O'Herne's companions captured. O'Herne had made a dash to get away, and after escaping from the attacking party, had fallen in with other natives supposed to be friendly, but that instead of proving to be so they had devoted the entire next day to his torture and death, beginning at daylight by cutting him with bolos and then roasting him all day by a slow fire, not finishing up until night. All these details had, the witness said, been gathered from the confessions of the men to whom they had given the cure. Sergeant Hallock described the torture of around a dozen natives at the town of Leon, Panay. He said they were captured and tortured in order to secure information of the murder of Private O'Herne.

Corporal Richard O'Brien, testified he had been present at Igbaras when the water cure was administered to the Presidente (or chief) of that town. "There was a Spanish woman in town--a woman of education--who was attacked by the American officers." The witness said he could not give the names of the officers, adding that he had not witnessed the incident, but that the woman's husband was his authority for the statement." O'Brien further testified that there was an "unwritten law out there to take no prisoners." He said "dum dum" bullets, or expanding bullets, were issued in the regular way with other ammunition. He had seen them strike a man and take the top of his head off.

=== General Arthur MacArthur ===
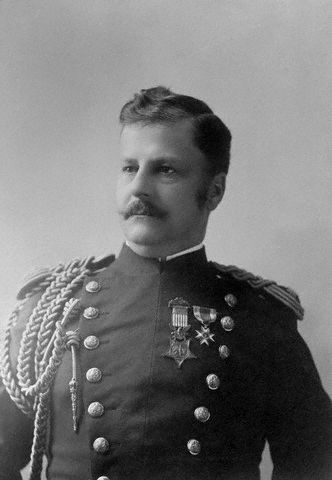
Arthur MacArthur, Jr.

General MacArthur testified before the committee twice. On April 13, he initially discussed the short war with the Spaniards and the American cooperation with the Filipinos. Then later that month, he testified again, regarding the capture of Emilio Aguinaldo. The General testified he had used deception to capture Mr. Aguinaldo, saying "I am responsible in that matter in every way and particular. It was one of the deceptions frequently practiced in war, and whatever deception attached thereto, I take." He attributed the plan to Gen. Funston, but said he (MacArthur) was responsible for approving the plant. However, he insisted doing so did not violate the rules of civilized warfare. MacArthur also distanced himself from any alleged orders of General Jacob H. Smith to turn Samar a howling wilderness.

MacArthur said that absolute chaos would result should the Filipinos be given complete independence and the United States entirely withdraw from the islands. Aguinaldo also had told him it would be impossible at this stage of their evolution for his own people to establish a stable independent Government. He said Aguinaldo was at the time of the conversation a "qualified prisoner", but that there was no coercion or duress resorted to extract the statement.

In regards to the death toll in the Philippines, he said, "The destruction is simply incident to war, and of course embraces a very small percentage of the total population, which is dense." In response, Senator Patterson noted that the death toll in one province was nearly a third. Gen. MacArthur spoke of the capture of papers from high Filipino officials in which the information was contained that, if President McKinley should be re-elected, the insurgents would surrender to the authority of the United States.

=== Alleged war crimes ===
==== Concentration camps ====
Colonel Arthur L. Wagner, the Army's chief public relations officer, had spent two and a half years in the Philippines. Wagner testified in May, where he was questioned about concentration camps in the Philippines, 31 including deaths at the camps. In one camp, it was reported that the people were assembled according to villages, so that the people in all cases would have their old neighbors near them. So far as he had been able to observe, there was no evidence of want among the people there congregated. Moreover, they were surprisingly contented. Such camps, he insisted, were created to "protect friendly natives from the insurgents" and to "assure them an adequate food supply", while also teaching them "proper sanitary standards." People were limited to travel within 300 to 800 yards of the camp, beyond which was a so-called "dead line" that anyone caught crossing would be shot, though he claimed the standing order was not to shoot any helpless persons, or any others if the shooting could be avoided.

Colonel Wagner said that one of the principal purposes of concentrating the native people in the Philippines was to protect them against the Ladrones, which had been admirably accomplished. Another object of the camps had been that of facilitating the collection of the rice supplies in order to starve out the Ladrones and guerrillas. The result had been that hostile parties had practically disappeared and their leader, Malvar, had been captured. The policy had been necessary to "protect life and property, and he did not see how any other policy could have been successful. He said that the people were fed and given medical supplies, and the sanitation of the camps was looked after. He insisted that American camps in the Philippines no more could be compared to Valeriano Weyler's reconcentrado camps in Cuba than mercy could be compared to cruelty.

Over loud Republican protests, Senator Culberson began to read a letter from one of J. Franklin Bell's officers, which had been quoted in the Senate by Mr. Bacon, in which the officer described a concentration camp as a "suburb of hell." The chair ruled that unless the senator identified the author, who had asked to remain anonymous, it was "hearsay evidence" and directed the witness not to comment on it. But Culberson had already read part of the letter:

What a farce it all is ... this little spot of black sogginess is a reconcentrado pen, with a dead line outside, beyond which everything living is shot ... Upon arrival, I found 30 cases of smallpox, and average fresh ones of five a day, which practically have to be turned out to die. At nightfall crowds of huge vampire bats softly swirl out of their orgies over the dead. Mosquitos work in relays. This corpse-carcass stench wafts in and combined with some lovely municipal odors besides makes it slightly unpleasant here.

==== Torture of Filipinos ====
Col. Wagner said he had no personal knowledge of the tortures of the natives in the Philippines, but he gave several instances in which he had heard reports of torture. In most of these it was found on examination that the reports either were untrue or exaggerated.

Wagner said that he knew that one village had been burned because the citizens would not give information of the murderers of a native friendly to the United States.

After intense cross examination, Wagner agreed that some "innocents" had suffered in the Philippines, but he added that the same was true of every war and that it was an injustice as old as man. "The Almighty destroyed Sodom, notwithstanding the fact there were a few just people in that community." Senator Albert Beveridge replied, "I was thinking of that instance of Sodom and Gomorrah."

=== Senator Beveridge's conclusions ===
Senator Albert Beveridge published a separate senate document containing his views on the committee, published as Senate Document 422 in the 57th Congress, 1st session. Historian Miller criticized this secondary publication, calling it a "deceitful cut and paste job ... gleaning from the record anything that remotely supported his conclusion that the war was one of the most humane ones in history ... [Beveridge felt that] the Lodge committee had destroyed the malicious fiction of "the slanders of the Army".

== See also ==
- Little Brown Brother
- Philippine–American War
- Frederick Funston
