= 1896 Nebraska gubernatorial election =

- November 3, 1896
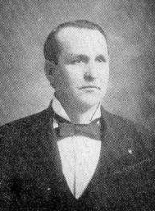

Nominee	Silas A. Holcomb	John H. MacColl
Party	Populist	Republican
Alliance	Democratic
Popular vote	116,415	94,723
Percentage	53.46%	43.50%
- County results Holcomb: 40–50% 50–60% 60–70% 70–80% MacColl: 40–50% 50–60%
Governor before election
Silas A. Holcomb
Populist
Elected Governor
Silas A. Holcomb
Populist

The 1896 Nebraska gubernatorial election was held on November 3, 1896, and featured incumbent Governor Silas A. Holcomb, a Populist, defeating his major rival, Republican nominee John H. MacColl, to win a second two-year term in office.

== General election ==
=== Candidates ===
Major party candidates

- Silas A. Holcomb, People's Independent and Democratic fusion candidate, incumbent Governor of Nebraska
- John H. MacColl, Republican candidate
- Robert S. Bibbs, Nebraska Gold Democratic candidate

Other candidates

- Richard A. Hawley, National Silver Party
- Joel Warner, Prohibition Party
- Charles Sadilek, Socialist Labor

=== Results ===
Nebraska gubernatorial election, 1896
Party	Candidate	Votes	%
Populist	Silas A. Holcomb (incumbent)	116,415	53.46%
Republican	John H. MacColl	94,723	43.50%
National Democratic	Robert S. Bibbs	3,557	1.63%
Prohibition	Joel Warner	1,560	0.72%
Silver	Richard A. Hawley	930	0.43%
Socialist Labor	Charles Sadilek	578	0.27%
Total votes		217,763	100.0%
Populist hold			

== See also ==
- 1896 Nebraska lieutenant gubernatorial election
