= Robert E. Moore =

American politician (1849–1921)

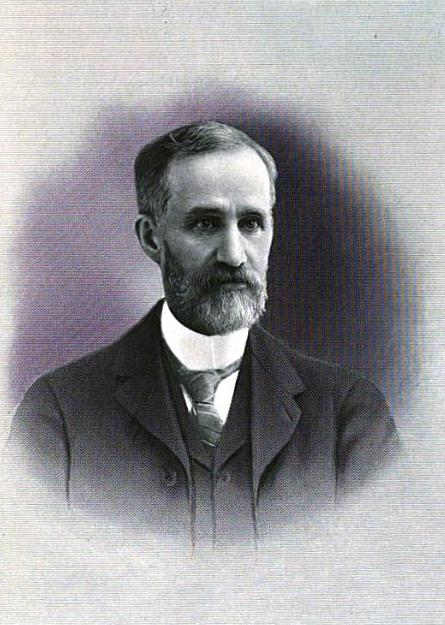

7th Lieutenant Governor of Nebraska
- In office 1895–1897
- Governor: Silas A. Holcomb
- Preceded by: Thomas Jefferson Majors
- Succeeded by: James E. Harris

11th Mayor of Lincoln
- In office April 9, 1883 – April 13, 1885
- Preceded by: John Doolittle
- Succeeded by: Carlos C. Burr

Personal details
- Born: October 22, 1849
- Died: December 6, 1921 (aged 72)
- Spouse: Emily J. Peterson (m. December 28, 1874)

Robert Emmett Moore (October 22, 1849 – December 6, 1921) was an American politician who served as seventh lieutenant governor of Nebraska, from 1895-97.

He also served as 11th mayor of Lincoln, Nebraska, from 1883-85.

Political offices
Preceded by Thomas Jefferson Majors	Lieutenant Governor of Nebraska; 1895 – 1897	Succeeded by James E. Harris
