= Monroe Hayward =

American judge and politician (1840–1899)

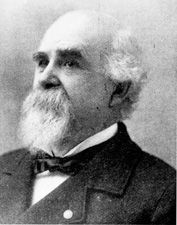

United States Senator-elect from Nebraska
- In office Died before taking office
- Preceded by: William V. Allen
- Succeeded by: William V. Allen

Personal details
- Born: Monroe Leland Hayward; December 22, 1840 Willsboro, New York, U.S.
- Died: December 5, 1899 (aged 58) Nebraska City, Nebraska, U.S.
- Party: Republican
- Children: William Hayward
- Relatives: Leland Hayward (grandson); Brooke Hayward (great-granddaughter)
- Education: Fort Edward Collegiate Institute

Monroe Leland Hayward (December 22, 1840 – December 5, 1899) was an American politician from Nebraska. He was elected to become a Senator of Nebraska in 1899, dying before taking the oath of office.

== Life and career ==
Hayward was born in Willsboro, New York. He served during the Civil War in the Twenty-second Regiment, New York Volunteer Infantry, and in the Fifth Regiment, New York Volunteer Cavalry. He graduated from Fort Edward Collegiate Institute, New York, in 1865. Hayward then studied law in Whitewater, Wisconsin; he was admitted to the bar in 1867 and commenced practice in Nebraska City, Nebraska. He was a member of the state constitutional convention in 1873. He became judge of the district court of Nebraska in 1886.

Hayward was elected as a Republican to the United States Senate on March 8, 1899, to fill the vacancy in the term beginning March 4, 1899. This delay was caused by the failure of the Nebraska Legislature to elect a Senator by the start of the term. He did not take the Senate's oath of office before his death and was hence never officially a Senator, both because his health deteriorated after his election, and the Senate had adjourned. He died in Nebraska City, Nebraska on December 5, 1899, while in a coma. He was interred in Wyuka Cemetery.

Sources at the time noted that while he was a Republican, the Governor appointing his replacement, William A. Poynter was a Populist. He was hence replaced by Populist William V. Allen. The Courier wrote: "Ethically as a republican senator was elected and has died a republican should be appointed to take his place, but such transcendental politics is still unheard of in the year of our Lord eighteen hundred and ninety-nine."

His son, Colonel William Hayward, commanded the 369th Infantry Regiment during the First World War, known as the Harlem Hellfighters.

His grandson was Broadway producer Leland Hayward, and the actress/writer Brooke Hayward is his great-granddaughter.

== See also ==
- List of members of the United States Congress who died in office (1790–1899)

Party political offices
Preceded by John McColl	Republican nominee for Governor of Nebraska; 1898	Succeeded by Charles Henry Dietrich
U.S. Senate
Preceded by William V. Allen	U.S. Senator-elect (Class 1) from Nebraska; 1899; Served alongside: John Thurston	Succeeded by William V. Allen
