= Edmund G. McGilton =

American politician and lawyer

11th Lieutenant Governor of Nebraska
- In office January 8, 1903 – January 3, 1907
- Governor: John H. Mickey
- Preceded by: Calvin F. Steele (Acting); Ezra P. Savage
- Succeeded by: Melville R. Hopewell

Personal details
- Born: February 10, 1859 Eau Galle, Wisconsin
- Died: August 31, 1933 (aged 75) Omaha, Nebraska
- Occupation: Politician

Edmund George McGilton (February 10, 1859 – August 31, 1933) was a Nebraska politician and lawyer who served as the 11th lieutenant governor from 1903 to 1907 under Governor John H. Mickey.

McGilton was born on February 10, 1859, in Eau Galle, Wisconsin. He graduated from Menomonie High School and the University of Wisconsin, where he also obtained a law degree in 1885. He served for a time as the Superintendent of Schools in Menomonie and then joined the legal department of the Wisconsin Central Railroad Company. In 1888, he moved to Omaha, Nebraska, and was active in the Republican Party. He served two terms as lieutenant governor (1903–05 and 1905–07) while John H. Mickey was governor. He practiced law in Omaha after that time, and was elected president of the Commercial Law League of America in 1916.

McGilton died on August 31, 1933, at Bishop Clarkson Hospital in Omaha, Nebraska.

Political offices
Preceded by Ezra P. Savage	Lieutenant Governor of Nebraska; 1903–1907	Succeeded by Melville R. Hopewell
