= Charles H. Dietrich =

American politician (1853–1924)

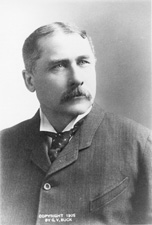

United States Senator from Nebraska
- In office May 1, 1901 – March 3, 1905
- Preceded by: William V. Allen
- Succeeded by: Elmer Burkett

11th Governor of Nebraska
- In office January 3, 1901 – May 1, 1901
- Lieutenant: Ezra P. Savage
- Preceded by: William A. Poynter
- Succeeded by: Ezra P. Savage

Personal details
- Born: November 26, 1853 Aurora, Illinois, U.S.
- Died: April 10, 1924 (aged 70) Hastings, Nebraska, U.S.
- Party: Republican

Charles Henry Dietrich (November 26, 1853 – April 10, 1924) was the 11th governor of Nebraska. Dietrich began his career in mercantile pursuits and banking. After serving as governor, he was elected U.S. Senator from May 1, 1901 to March 3, 1905.

== Personal life ==
He was born in Aurora, Illinois, and was of German ancestry. His education was attained in the public schools of his native state and he quit at the age of twelve.

Dietrich was married twice. His first wife, Elizabeth Slaker, died in 1887. After Elizabeth's death, he married Margretta Stewart in on October 27, 1909. Deitrich and Margretta lived in Hastings, Nebraska.

== Career ==
Dietrich was employed as a clerk in a hardware store in St. Joseph, Missouri. He moved to Chicago, Illinois and engaged in the hardware business. He moved to Deadwood, Dakota Territory (now South Dakota), in 1875 and engaged in mercantile pursuits, delivering goods on pack animals through the Black Hills. He then located and owned the 'Aurora' mine.

Dietrich settled in Hastings, Nebraska, in 1878 and engaged in mercantile pursuits and in banking. Dietrich founded the German National Bank at Hastings and served as the president of the bank from 1887 to 1905. He became the president of the Hastings Board of Trade.

Elected in 1900, Dietrich served as Governor of Nebraska from January 3, 1901, to May 1, 1901. He resigned his governorship to replace interim U.S. Senator William V. Allen, who had been appointed in 1899 after Monroe L. Hayward died in office.

His tenure in the Senate lasted from May 1, 1901 to March 3, 1905. His Senate service was most notable as a pro-imperialist on the Lodge Committee that investigated war crimes during the Philippine–American War. He did not run for reelection in 1904.

=== Bribery charge ===
Before he assumed his Senate seat, Dietrich accepted money from Jacob Fisher in exchange for obtaining Fisher's appointment as a U.S. Postmaster. Dietrich and Fisher were charged with conspiracy to receive a bribe, accepting a bribe and profiting by the leasing of a building to the government. But before the trial could begin, Judge Vandeventer held that Dietrich could not be prosecuted because the alleged bribery occurred after he was elected, but before Dietrich had been sworn in on December 2, 1901. All the charges were dropped, and Dietrich continued to serve as a US Senator from Nebraska.

== Death ==
Dietrich retired in 1905 and died in Hastings, Nebraska.

Party political offices
Preceded by Monroe Hayward	Republican nominee for Governor of Nebraska; 1900	Succeeded by John H. Mickey
Political offices
Preceded by William A. Poynter	Governor of Nebraska; January 1901 – May 1901	Succeeded by Ezra P. Savage
U.S. Senate
Preceded by William V. Allen	U.S. senator (Class 1) from Nebraska; 1901–1905; Served alongside: Joseph H. Millard	Succeeded by Elmer J. Burkett
