= James E. Harris =

American politician (1840–1923)

8th Lieutenant Governor of Nebraska
- In office 1897–1899
- Governor: Silas A. Holcomb
- Preceded by: Robert E. Moore
- Succeeded by: Edward A. Gilbert

Personal details
- Born: May 27, 1840 Licking County, Ohio
- Died: September 2, 1923 (aged 83) San Bernardino County, California
- Party: Fusion Party
- Education: Eureka College

James Eastman Harris (May 27, 1840 – September 2, 1923) was a Nebraska politician who served as the eighth lieutenant governor of Nebraska from 1897 to 1899.

Harris was born to Abram and Phebe Eastman Harris in Licking County, Ohio on May 27, 1840. He briefly attended Bethany College starting in 1860, but his studies were interrupted by the Civil War. He subsequently obtained a degree from Eureka College. In 1866, he married Angeline Mitchell, daughter of Rev. D.G. Mitchell. Becoming a teacher and a preacher, he led the Utica (Ohio) Normal Training School for Teachers for nine years.

Around 1885 he moved to a farm in Nemaha County, Nebraska, and became pastor of a church in Auburn. He was elected to the Nebraska Legislature in 1892, and in 1896 elected to serve as Lieutenant Governor.

He died in 1923 and was buried at Evergreen Memorial Park in Riverside, California.

Political offices
Preceded by Robert E. Moore	Lieutenant Governor of Nebraska; 1897–1899	Succeeded by Edward A. Gilbert
