= Ezra P. Savage =

American politician (1842–1920)

Ezra Perin Savage
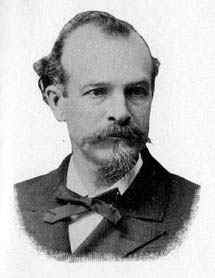

12th Governor of Nebraska
- In office May 1, 1901 – January 8, 1903
- Lieutenant: Calvin F. Steele (acting)
- Preceded by: Charles H. Dietrich
- Succeeded by: John H. Mickey

10th Lieutenant Governor of Nebraska
- In office January 3, 1901 – May 1, 1901
- Governor: Charles H. Dietrich
- Preceded by: Edward A. Gilbert
- Succeeded by: Calvin F. Steele (acting); Edmund G. McGilton

Mayor of South Omaha, Nebraska
- In office 1887

Member of the Nebraska House of Representatives
- In office 1883

Personal details
- Born: April 3, 1842 Connersville, Indiana, U.S.
- Died: January 8, 1920 (aged 77) Tacoma, Washington, U.S.
- Party: Republican
- Spouses: Anna Chase Rich (m. 1866; died 1883) Elvira Hess (m. 1896; died 1899) Julia McCullough (m. 1899)

Ezra Perin Savage (April 3, 1842 – January 8, 1920) was an American politician and the 12th governor of Nebraska from 1901 to 1903. He was the tenth lieutenant governor in 1901 serving under Governor Charles H. Dietrich.

Savage was born in Connersville, Indiana, but his parents moved to Iowa shortly after his birth. He graduated from high school in Davenport, Iowa and then attended Iowa College.

== Career ==
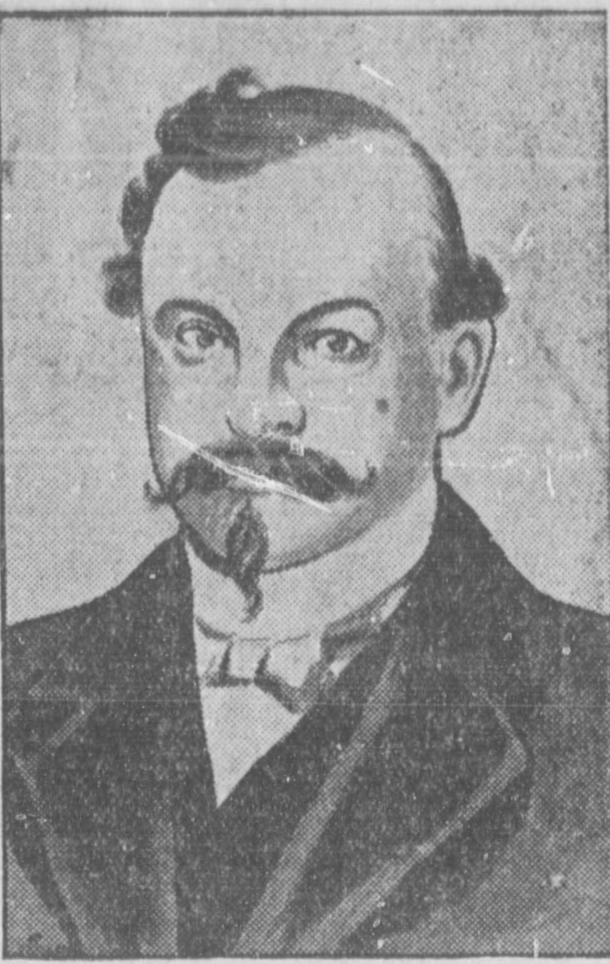
Ezra Savage ca. 1901 (sketch)

Savage enlisted in the Union Army as a soldier and scout at the start of the Civil War, but he was discharged due to a disability. After the war he returned to Iowa and studied law, and was admitted to the bar in 1875. He moved to Nebraska in 1879 and founded Sargent, Nebraska in Custer County.

In 1883, Savage was elected to the Nebraska House of Representatives, where he served two terms. After leaving office he moved to Omaha, where he became the first mayor of South Omaha in 1887. He was City Councilman in 1888. He was elected lieutenant governor in 1900. Savage took over as governor of Nebraska on May 1, 1901, after the resignation of Charles H. Dietrich to fill a US Senate seat.

Savage intended to run for a second term as governor, but the criticism which was caused by his parole and pardon of former State Treasurer Joseph S. Bartley, who was serving a prison sentence for embezzlement, influenced his decision to step down from the race.

== Family life ==
Savage married three times: to Anna Chase Rich in 1866, who died in 1883; to Elvira Hess in 1896, and she died in 1899; and finally to Julia McCullough in 1896, daughter of Alexander and Esther McCullough of Pennsylvania. She survived his passing and lived in Tacoma until her death in May 1941.

He had six children, five of them by Anna Rich, and the last, born in 1880 to Elvira Hess.

== Death ==
Shortly after serving out his one term as governor, Savage moved to Tacoma, Washington. He died in Tacoma and is interred at Tacoma Cemetery.

Political offices
Preceded by Edward A. Gilbert	Lieutenant Governor of Nebraska; 1901	Succeeded by Edmund G. McGilton
Preceded by Charles H. Dietrich	Governor of Nebraska; 1901–1903	Succeeded by John H. Mickey
