= Silas A. Holcomb =

American judge (1858–1920)

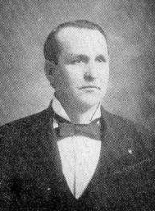

9th Governor of Nebraska
- In office January 3, 1895 – January 5, 1899
- Lieutenant: Robert E. Moore; James E. Harris
- Preceded by: Lorenzo Crounse
- Succeeded by: William A. Poynter

Personal details
- Born: August 25, 1858 Gibson County, Indiana, U.S.
- Died: April 25, 1920 (aged 61) Bellingham, Washington, U.S.
- Party: Peoples
- Spouse: Alice Brinson

Silas Alexander Holcomb (August 25, 1858 – April 25, 1920) was a Nebraska lawyer and politician elected as the ninth governor of Nebraska and serving from 1895 to 1899. He ran under a fusion ticket between the Populist and the Democratic Party.

Holcomb was born in Gibson County, Indiana, helped on the family farm and went to the local schools in winter. At age seventeen, he began to teach school. After his father's death in 1878, he moved with mother and siblings to Hamilton County, Nebraska in 1879. He worked in Thummel & Platt law office in Grand Island and was admitted to the Nebraska bar in 1882. On April 13, 1882, he married Martha Alice Brinson in Mills County, Iowa. They moved to Broken Bow where he farmed and practiced law.

== Career ==
From 1891 to 1894, Holcomb served as a 12th District judge. In 1894, with the support of William Jennings Bryan, he was elected Governor of Nebraska. He was re-elected in 1896. During his tenure, sounder financial policies were initiated and corruption and mismanagement in the state treasurer's office was addressed; reforms in state government programs were initiated. Following his years as governor, Holcomb was appointed a judge of the Nebraska Supreme Court in 1899. From 1904 to 1906, he served as chief judge. He left the Court in 1906, but then he served on the Nebraska Board of Commissioners of State Institutions from 1913 until his failing health made it necessary for him to resign.

In 1896, Holcomb was accused of tampering with ballots regarding constitutional amendments. In 1899, The Norfolk Weekly News accused Holcomb of ballot fraud in an attempt to "steal two seats on the supreme bench" in a party meeting. During balloting, it was alleged that votes were changed, and that when a recount was asked for, "Holcomb paid no attention to their suggestions." He was ultimately appointed to serve on the court in 1899.

== Death ==
Holcomb moved to Bellingham, Washington, where he lived with his daughter until his death on April 25, 1920. Holcomb's body was returned to Nebraska and he is interred at Broken Bow Cemetery, Broken Bow, Custer County, Nebraska.

Party political offices
Preceded by Julius Sterling Morton	Democratic nominee for Governor of Nebraska; 1894, 1896	Succeeded by William A. Poynter
Preceded by Charles Van Wyck	Populist nominee for Governor of Nebraska; 1894, 1896	Succeeded by William A. Poynter
Political offices
Preceded by Lorenzo Crounse	Governor of Nebraska; 1895–1899	Succeeded by William A. Poynter
