= William A. Poynter =

American politician (1848–1909)

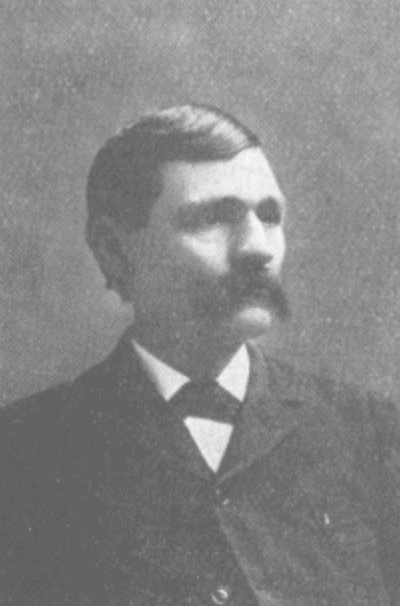

10th Governor of Nebraska
- In office January 5, 1899 – January 3, 1901
- Lieutenant: Edward A. Gilbert
- Preceded by: Silas A. Holcomb
- Succeeded by: Charles Henry Dietrich

16th President pro tempore of the Nebraska Senate
- In office January 1891 – January 1893
- Preceded by: Church Howe
- Succeeded by: Erasmus M. Correll

Member of the Nebraska Senate
- In office Elected 1890

Member of the Nebraska House of Representatives
- In office Elected 1884

Personal details
- Born: William Amos Poynter; May 29, 1848 Eureka, Illinois, US
- Died: April 5, 1909 (aged 60) Lincoln, Nebraska, US
- Resting place: Wyuka Cemetery
- Party: Democratic; Populist
- Spouse: Maria Josephine McCorkle
- Children: 2
- Education: Eureka College

William Amos Poynter (May 29, 1848 – April 5, 1909) was a Nebraska politician and the tenth governor of Nebraska from 1899 to 1901, running under a fusion ticket between the Populist Party and the Democratic Party. He had previously also been elected to the former Nebraska State House of Representatives in 1885 and the State Senate in 1891.

== Early life ==
Born in Eureka, Illinois, Poynter completed his college studies at Eureka College, graduating in 1867. He married Maria Josephine McCorkle in 1869, and the couple had two children: Josephine and Charles. Poynter worked as a merchant in Eureka, Illinois, for several years until relocating his family to Albion, Nebraska in 1879.

== Career ==
Poynter worked as a rancher and a farmer in Boone County, Nebraska, and became active in politics. He helped organize the Farmers' Alliance and was elected to the Nebraska House of Representatives in 1884. He was elected to the Nebraska State Senate in 1890 and named President Pro Tempore of that body.

Poynter was nominated again for President pro tempore of the Nebraska Senate in 1892, but he was defeated by Republican George D. Meiklejohn. He served as a member of the Nebraska Legislature for nearly two decades before being elected governor in 1898. During his tenure as governor, railroad regulations were promoted, and legislation was sanctioned that established Lincoln, Nebraska, as the site for the state fair. Poynter served only one term as governor, being narrowly defeated in 1900 by Charles H. Dietrich. When he retired from public life, he remained active in his own business affairs and was also president of the Security Savings and Loan Association.

== Death ==
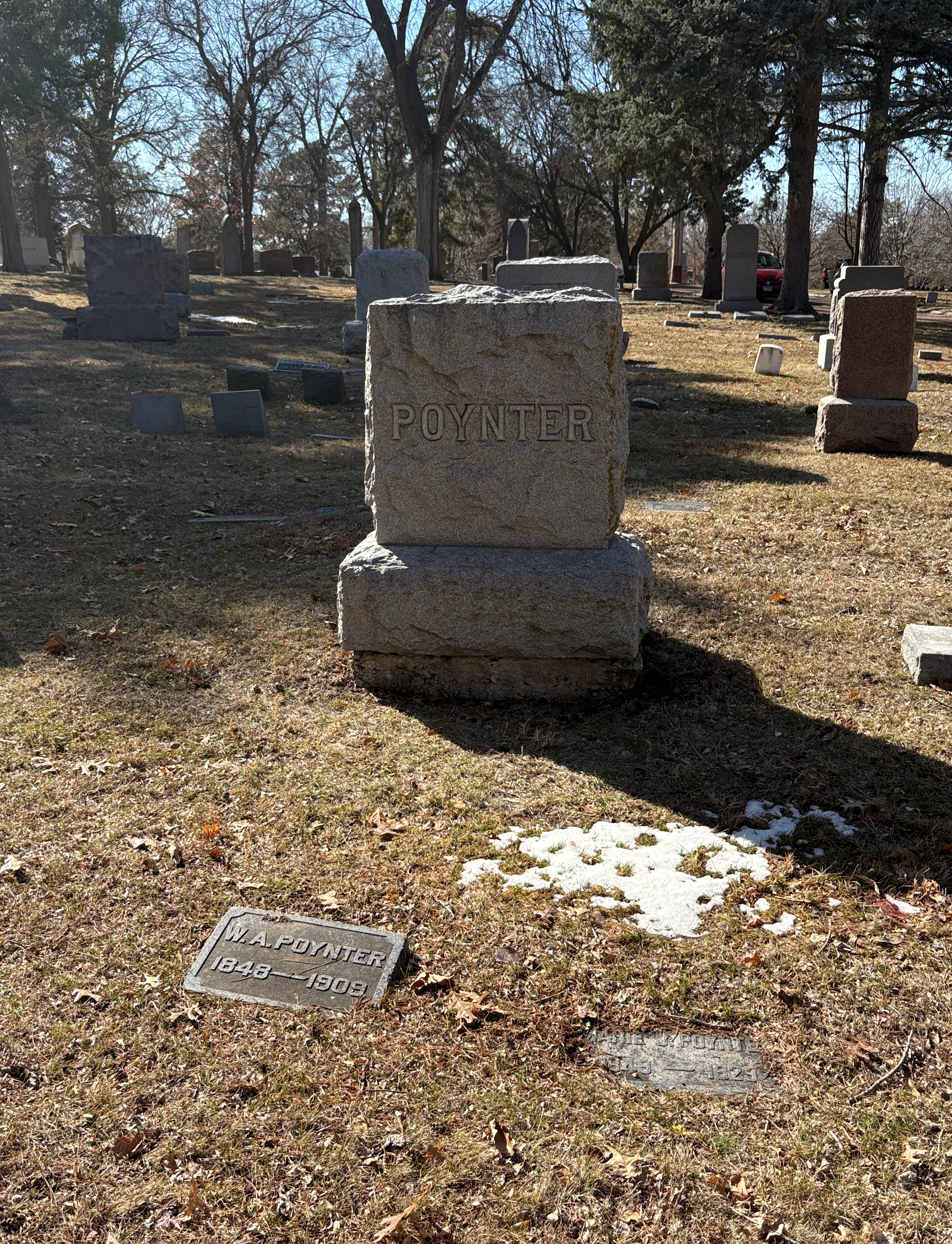
Poynter's grave at Wyuka Cemetery

Poynter died suddenly while visiting then Governor Ashton C. Shallenberger. He is interred at Wyuka Cemetery, Lincoln, Lancaster County, Nebraska.

Party political offices
Preceded by Silas A. Holcomb	Democratic nominee for Governor of Nebraska; 1898, 1900	Succeeded by William Henry Thompson
Political offices
Preceded by Silas A. Holcomb	Governor of Nebraska; 1899–1901	Succeeded by Charles H. Dietrich
