= Edward A. Gilbert =

American politician (1854–1935)

9th Lieutenant Governor of Nebraska
- In office 1899–1901
- Governor: William A. Poynter
- Preceded by: James E. Harris
- Succeeded by: Ezra P. Savage

Personal details
- Born: July 6, 1854 Macoupin County, Illinois, U.S.
- Died: March 13, 1935 (aged 80) Long Beach, California, U.S.
- Party: Fusion Party
- Spouse: Louise May

Edward Addison Gilbert (July 6, 1854 – March 13, 1935) (often referred to as "E.A. Gilbert") was a Nebraska politician who served as the ninth lieutenant governor of Nebraska from 1899 until 1901 under Governor William A. Poynter. He also served as a Republican in the Nebraska legislature in 1889. In 1900, he was nominated for a second term as lieutenant governor as a Silver Republican aligned with the Populists, and directly as a Populist in 1902 but did not prevail.

Gilbert was born in Illinois and moved from Macoupin County, Illinois, to York County, Nebraska, in 1884. He married Louise May on January 1, 1878, in Carlinville, Illinois. He died in Long Beach, California, on March 13, 1935, at the age of 80.

Political offices
Preceded by James E. Harris	Lieutenant Governor of Nebraska; 1899–1901	Succeeded by Ezra P. Savage
