= 1910 Nebraska lieutenant gubernatorial election =

- November 8, 1910
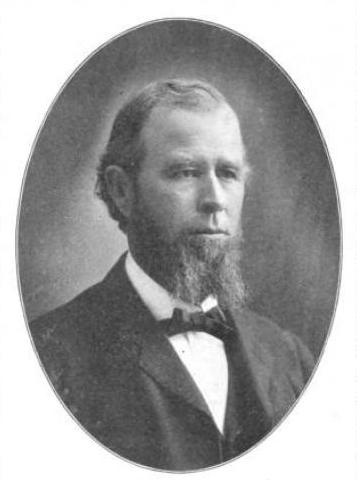

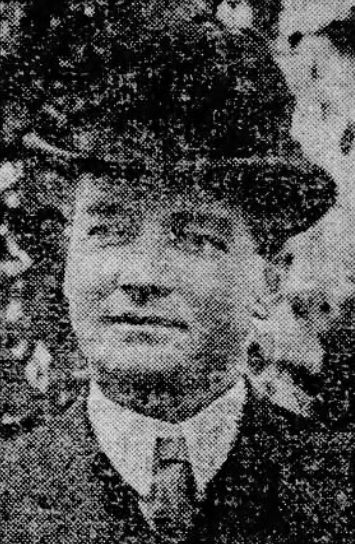
Nominee	Melville R. Hopewell	Ralph A. Clark
Party	Republican	Democratic
Popular vote	113,002	110,704
Percentage	48.4%	47.4%
Lieutenant Governor before election
Melville R. Hopewell
Republican
Elected Lieutenant Governor
Melville R. Hopewell
Republican

The 1910 Nebraska lieutenant gubernatorial election was held on November 8, 1910, and featured incumbent Nebraska Lieutenant Governor Melville R. Hopewell, a Republican, defeating Democratic nominee Ralph A. Clark as well as Socialist Party nominee George L. Slutter and Prohibition Party nominee Samuel Lichty.

== Democratic primary ==
=== Candidates ===
- Ralph A. Clark, farmer, banker and member of the Nebraska House of Representatives since 1909 and previously from 1897 to 1899 from Stella, Nebraska
- William H. Green, editor of the Creighton Liberal newspaper, dealer of agricultural implements, and Democratic nominee for lieutenant governor in 1906 from Creighton, Nebraska

=== Results ===
Democratic primary results
Party	Candidate	Votes	%
Democratic	Ralph A. Clark	21,598	51.57
Democratic	William H. Green	20,282	48.43

== People's Independent primary ==
=== Candidates ===
The People's Independent Party, a remnant of the earlier populist movement, chose between the two democratic candidates for lieutenant governor. Although William H. Green edged out the victory in the primary, the People's Independent Party decided to endorse Ralph A. Clark instead, since he was the Democratic nominee and the party did not desire to split the vote with the Democrats in the general election.

=== Results ===
People's Independent primary results
Party	Candidate	Votes	%
Populist	William H. Green	1,461	52.27
Populist	Ralph A. Clark	1,334	47.73

== Prohibition primary ==
=== Candidates ===
Samuel Lichty ran unopposed for the Prohibition Party nomination. He was the secretary of the Richardson County Farm Mutual Insurance Company from Falls City, Nebraska.

=== Results ===
Prohibition primary results
Party	Candidate	Votes	%
Prohibition	Samuel Lichty	456	100.0

== Republican primary ==
=== Candidates ===
- Melville R. Hopewell, incumbent Nebraska Lieutenant Governor from Tekamah, Nebraska
- Walter Johnson from Omaha, Nebraska, who was previously from Ord, Nebraska, and was a Democratic candidate for US House of Representatives in 1908

=== Results ===
Republican primary results
Party	Candidate	Votes	%
Republican	Melville R. Hopewell (incumbent)	21,943	58.49
Republican	Walter Johnson	15,570	41.51

== Socialist primary ==
=== Candidates ===
George L. Slutter ran unopposed for the Socialist Party nomination. He was from Omaha, Nebraska.

=== Results ===
Socialist primary results
Party	Candidate	Votes	%
Socialist	George L. Slutter	735	100.0

== General election ==
=== Results ===
Nebraska lieutenant gubernatorial election, 1910
Party	Candidate	Votes	%
Republican	Melville R. Hopewell (incumbent)	113,002	48.42
Democratic	Ralph A. Clark (Note: Cross-endorsed by the People's Independent (Populist) Party.)	110,704	47.44
Socialist	George L. Slutter	6,115	2.62
Prohibition	Samuel Lichty	3,543	1.52
Total votes		233,364	100.00
Republican hold			

== Aftermath ==
On May 2, 1911, incumbent Nebraska Lieutenant Governor Melville R. Hopewell, who was reelected in this election, died while in office. After the death of Hopewell, John H. Morehead was considered to be the acting lieutenant governor due to his position as president pro tempore of the Nebraska Senate based on Article V, Section 18, of the Nebraska Constitution until another lieutenant governor was elected in the 1912 Nebraska lieutenant gubernatorial election.

== See also ==
- 1910 Nebraska gubernatorial election
