= 1914 Nebraska gubernatorial election =

- November 3, 1914
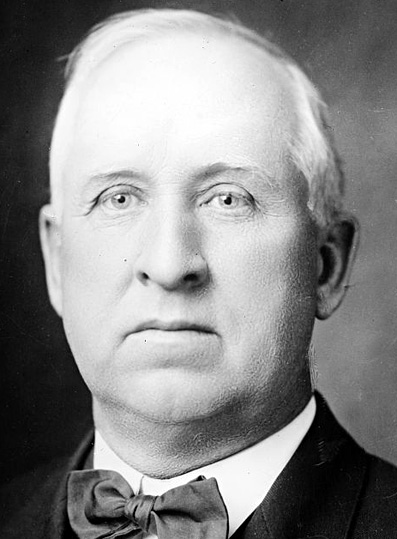

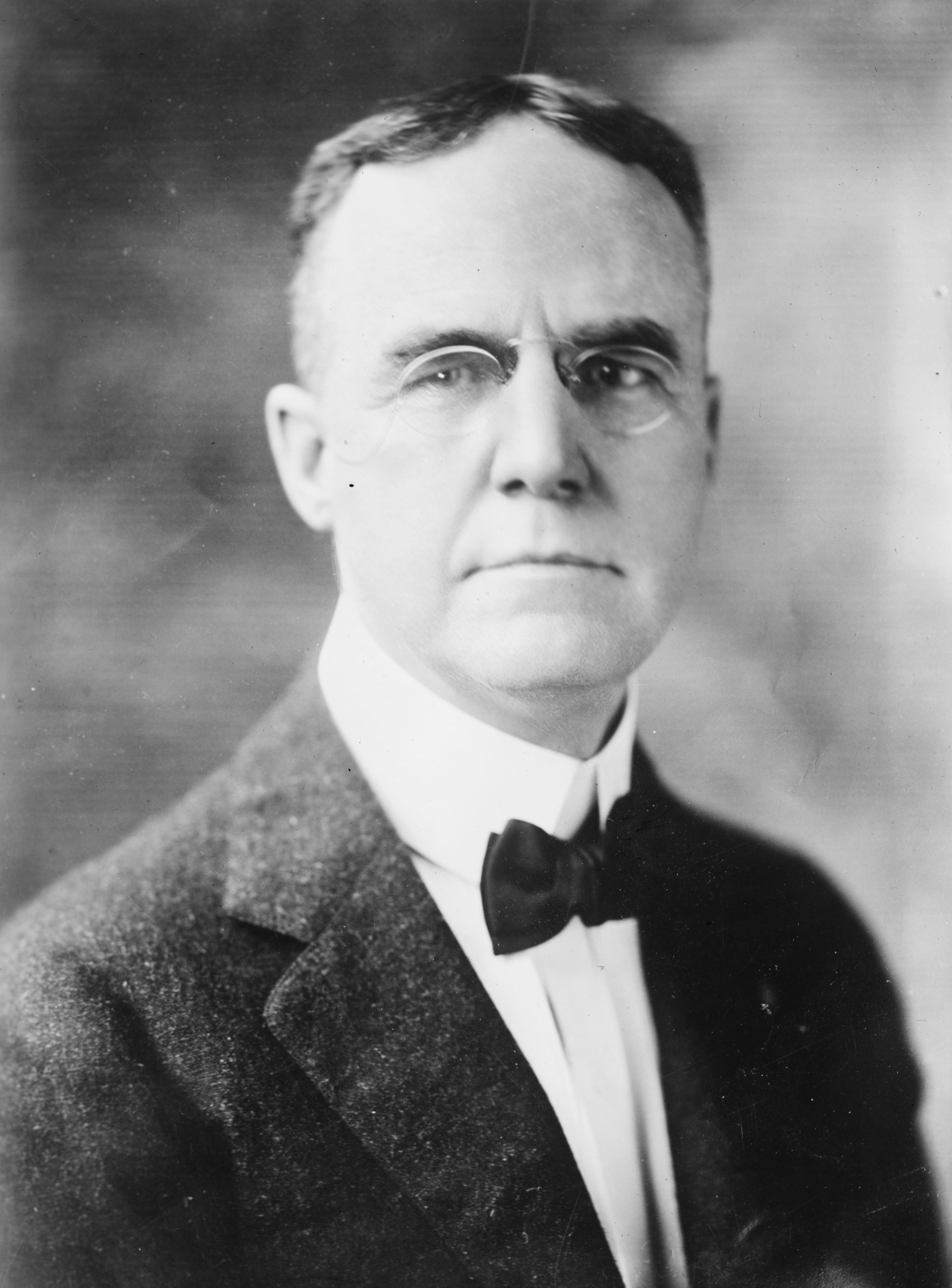
Nominee	John H. Morehead	Robert B. Howell
Party	Democratic	Republican
Alliance	Populist
Popular vote	120,206	101,229
Percentage	50.36%	42.41%
- County results Morehead: 40–50% 50–60% 60–70% Howell: 40–50% 50–60%
Governor before election
John H. Morehead
Democratic
Elected Governor
John H. Morehead
Democratic

The 1914 Nebraska gubernatorial election was held on November 3, 1914.

Incumbent Democratic Governor John H. Morehead defeated Republican nominee Robert B. Howell with 50.36% of the vote.

== Primary elections ==
Primary elections were held on August 18, 1914.

=== Democratic primary ===
==== Candidates ====
- George W. Berge, Fusion candidate for governor in 1904
- Richard Lee Metcalfe, former Military Governor of the Panama Canal Zone
- John H. Morehead, incumbent Governor

==== Results ====
Democratic primary results
Party	Candidate	Votes	%
Democratic	John H. Morehead (incumbent)	39,264	62.39
Democratic	Richard Lee Metcalfe	12,373	19.66
Democratic	George W. Berge	11,300	17.95
Total votes		62,937	100.00

=== People's Independent primary ===
==== Candidates ====
- George W. Berge, Fusion candidate for governor in 1904
- John H. Morehead, incumbent Governor

==== Results ====
People's Independent primary results
Party	Candidate	Votes	%
Populist	John H. Morehead (incumbent)	724	57.05
Populist	George W. Berge	545	42.95
Total votes		1,269	100.00

=== Progressive primary ===
==== Candidates ====
- Harry E. Sackett, attorney, former State Senator

==== Withdrew ====
- Arthur Wray, judge

==== Results ====
Progressive primary results
Party	Candidate	Votes	%
Progressive	Harry E. Sackett	1,974	100.00
Total votes		1,974	100.00

=== Prohibition primary ===
==== Candidates ====
- Nathan Wilson, Prohibition candidate for governor in 1912

==== Results ====
Prohibition primary results
Party	Candidate	Votes	%
Prohibition	Nathan Wilson	333	100.00
Total votes		333	100.00

=== Republican primary ===
==== Candidates ====
- John Ceplecha
- Robert B. Howell, former State Senator
- Ross L. Hammond, newspaper editor
- James Harvey Kemp, State Senator
- John Stevens
- John O. Yeiser, member of the State Board of Pardons

==== Results ====
Republican primary results
Party	Candidate	Votes	%
Republican	Robert B. Howell	23,410	34.86
Republican	Ross L. Hammond	17,131	25.51
Republican	James Harvey Kemp	14,374	21.41
Republican	John Stevens	6,265	9.33
Republican	John O. Yeiser	3,954	5.89
Republican	John Ceplecha	2,008	2.99
Republican	Harry E. Sackett	10	0.01
Total votes		67,152	100.00

=== Socialist primary ===
==== Candidates ====
- George C. Porter, Socialist candidate for Nebraska's 2nd congressional district in 1908

==== Results ====
Socialist primary results
Party	Candidate	Votes	%
Socialist	George C. Porter	852	100.00
Total votes		852	100.00

== General election ==
=== Candidates ===
Major party candidates

- John H. Morehead, Democratic and People's Independent
- Robert B. Howell, Republican

Other candidates

- Harry E. Sackett, Progressive
- Nathan Wilson, Prohibition
- George C. Porter, Socialist

=== Results ===
1914 Nebraska gubernatorial election (Note: Some sources give Morehead's vote as 120,201.)
Party	Candidate	Votes	%
Democratic	John H. Morehead (incumbent)	120,206	50.36%
Republican	Robert B. Howell	101,229	42.41%
Progressive	Harry E. Sackett	8,655	3.63%
Socialist	George C. Porter	5,754	2.41%
Prohibition	Nathan Wilson	2,873	1.20%
Majority		18,977	7.95%
Turnout		238,717	
Democratic hold			

==== By County ====
By county

County	Person Democratic		Person Republican		Various candidates Other parties		Margin		Total votes
County	#	%	#	%	#	%	#	%	Total votes
Adams County									
Antelope County									
Arthur County									
Banner County									
Blaine County									
Boone County									
Box Butte County									
Boyd County									
Brown County									
Buffalo County									
Burt County									
Butler County									
Cass County									
Cedar County									
Chase County									
Cherry County									
Cheyenne County									
Clay County									
Colfax County									
Cuming County									
Custer County									
Dakota County									
Dawes County									
Dawson County									
Deuel County									
Dixon County									
Dodge County									
Douglas County									
Dundy County									
Fillmore County									
Franklin County									
Frontier County									
Furnas County									
Gage County									
Garden County									
Garfield County									
Gosper County									
Grant County									
Greeley County									
Hall County									
Hamilton County									
Hayes County									
Hitchcock County									
Holt County									
Hooker County									
Howard County									
Jefferson County									
Johnson County									
Kearney County									
Keith County									
Keya Paha County									
Kimball County									
Knox County									
Lancaster County									
Lincoln County									
Logan County									
Loup County									
Madison County									
McPherson County									
Merrick County									
Morrill County									
Nance County									
Nance County									
Nemaha County									
Nuckolls County									
Otoe County									
Pawnee County									
Perkins County									
Phelps County									
Pierce County									
Platte County									
Polk County									
Red Willow County									
Richardson County									
Rock County									
Saline County									
Sarpy County									
Saunders County									
Scotts Bluff County									
Seward County									
Sheridan County									
Sioux County									
Stanton County									
Thayer County									
Stanton County									
Thurston County									
Valley County									
Washington County									
Wayne County									
Webster County									
Wheeler County									
York County									
Totals									

== See also ==
- 1914 Nebraska lieutenant gubernatorial election

== Bibliography ==
- Sheldon, Addison E., ed. (1915). The Nebraska Blue Book and Historical Register 1915. Lincoln: State Journal Company.
