= 1908 Nebraska gubernatorial election =

- November 3, 1908
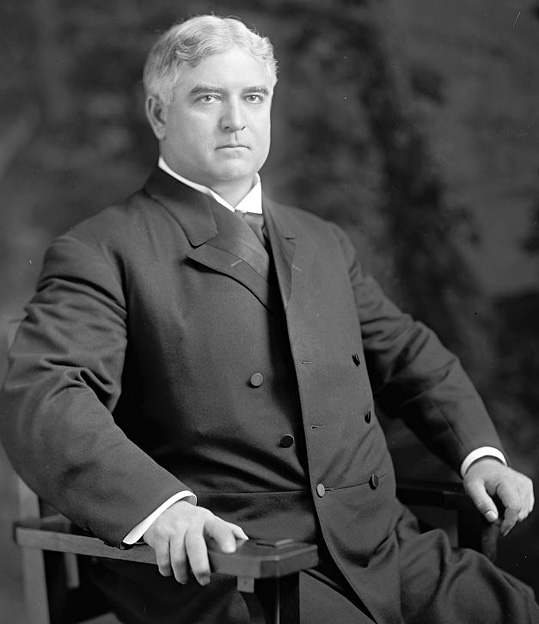

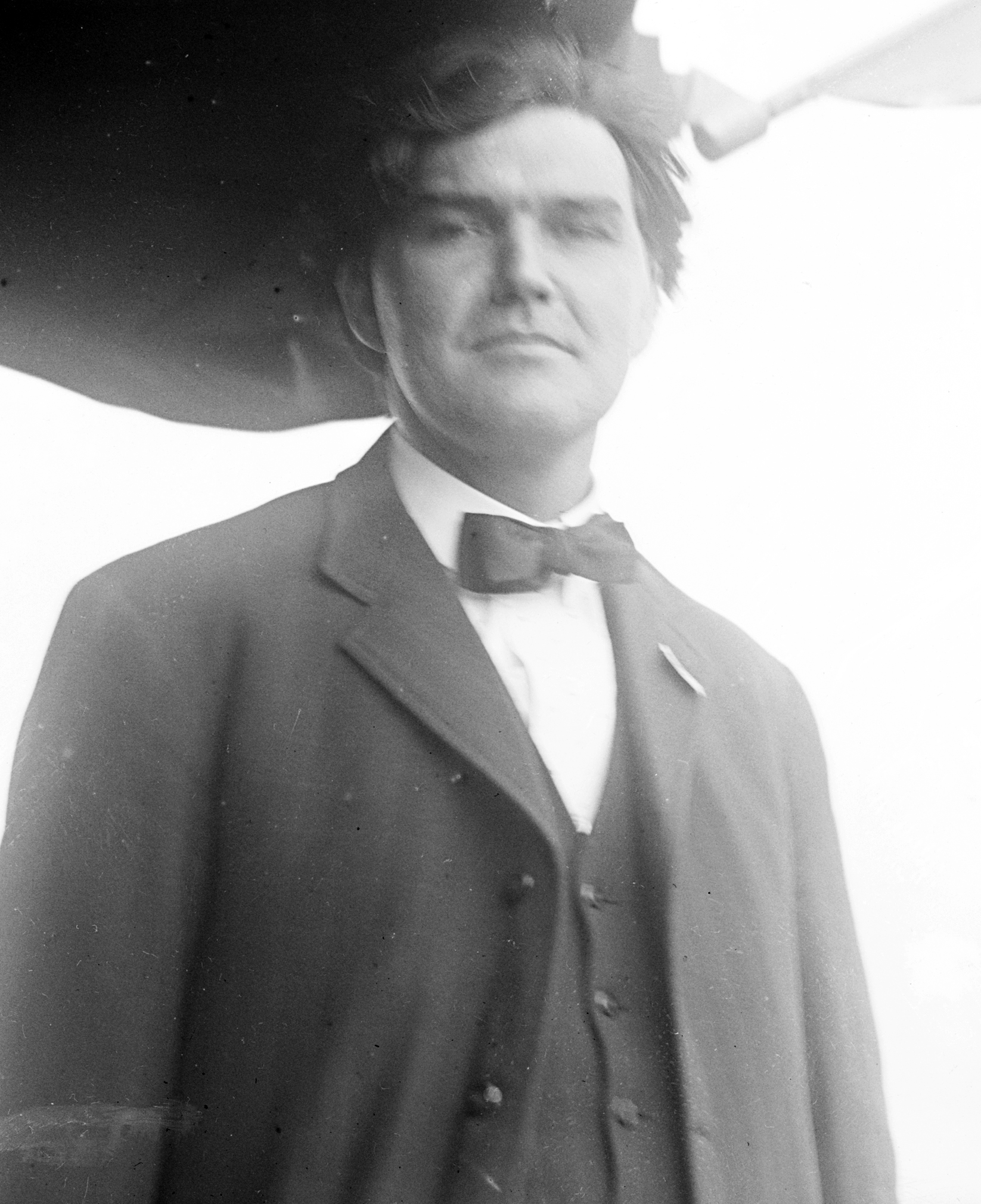
Nominee	Ashton C. Shallenberger	George L. Sheldon
Party	Democratic	Republican
Alliance	Populist
Popular vote	132,960	125,976
Percentage	49.90%	47.28%
- County results Shallenberger: 40–50% 50–60% 60–70% Sheldon: 40–50% 50–60% 60–70% Tie: 40–50%
Governor before election
George L. Sheldon
Republican
Elected Governor
Ashton C. Shallenberger
Democratic

The 1908 Nebraska gubernatorial election was held on November 3, 1908.

Incumbent Republican Governor George L. Sheldon was defeated by Democratic nominee Ashton C. Shallenberger.

== Primary elections ==
Primary elections were held on September 1, 1908.

=== Democratic primary ===
==== Candidates ====
- George W. Berge, Fusion candidate for governor in 1904
- James Dahlman, Mayor of Omaha
- Ashton C. Shallenberger, Fusion candidate for governor in 1906

==== Results ====
Democratic primary results
Party	Candidate	Votes	%
Democratic	Ashton C. Shallenberger	12,526	38.45
Democratic	James Dahlman	10,157	31.18
Democratic	George W. Berge	9,894	30.37
Total votes		32,577	100.00

=== People's Independent primary ===
==== Candidates ====
- George W. Berge, Fusion candidate for governor in 1904
- Ashton C. Shallenberger, Fusion candidate for governor in 1906

==== Results ====
People's Independent primary results
Party	Candidate	Votes	%
Populist	George W. Berge	2,317	63.12
Populist	Ashton C. Shallenberger	1,354	36.88
Total votes		3,671	100.00

Berge withdrew his candidacy in favor of Shallenberger.

=== Prohibition primary ===
==== Candidates ====
- Rev. Roy R. Teeter

==== Results ====
Prohibition primary results
Party	Candidate	Votes	%
Prohibition	Roy R. Teeter	711	100.00
Total votes		711	100.00

=== Republican primary ===
==== Candidates ====
- George L. Sheldon, incumbent Governor

==== Results ====
Republican primary results
Party	Candidate	Votes	%
Republican	George L. Sheldon (incumbent)	50,282	100.00
Total votes		50,282	100.00

=== Socialist primary ===
==== Candidates ====
- C. H. Harbaugh
- J. W. Walker

==== Results ====
Socialist primary results
Party	Candidate	Votes	%
Socialist	C. H. Harbaugh	240	58.25
Socialist	J. W. Walker	172	41.75
Total votes		412	100.00

== General election ==
=== Candidates ===
Major party candidates

- Ashton C. Shallenberger, Democratic and People's Independent
- George L. Sheldon, Republican

Other candidates

- Roy R. Teeter, Prohibition
- C. H. Harbaugh, Socialist

=== Results ===
1908 Nebraska gubernatorial election (Note: Some sources give Sheldon's vote as 125,967.)
Party	Candidate	Votes	%
Democratic	Ashton C. Shallenberger	132,960	49.90%
Republican	George L. Sheldon (incumbent)	125,976	47.28%
Prohibition	Roy R. Teeter	4,464	1.67%
Socialist	C. H. Harbaugh	3,069	1.15%
Majority		6,984	2.62%
Turnout		266,469	
Democratic gain from Republican			

== See also ==
- 1908 Nebraska lieutenant gubernatorial election

== Bibliography ==
- Sheldon, Addison E., ed. (1915). The Nebraska Blue Book and Historical Register 1915. Lincoln: State Journal Company.
