= 1908 Nebraska lieutenant gubernatorial election =

- November 3, 1908
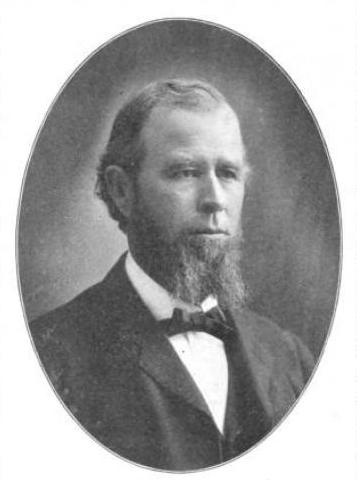

Nominee	Melville R. Hopewell	Erasmus O. Garrett
Party	Republican	Democratic
Popular vote	127,805	127,575
Percentage	48.4%	48.3%
Lieutenant Governor before election
Melville R. Hopewell
Republican
Elected Lieutenant Governor
Melville R. Hopewell
Republican

The 1908 Nebraska lieutenant gubernatorial election was held on November 3, 1908, and featured incumbent Nebraska Lieutenant Governor Melville R. Hopewell, a Republican, defeating Democratic nominee Erasmus O. Garrett as well as Prohibition Party nominee Frank E. Linch and Socialist Party nominee Thomas Jorgenson.

== Democratic primary ==
=== Candidates ===
- Erasmus O. Garrett, former superintendent of schools and general agent for the American Book Company from Fremont, Nebraska
- James A. Grimison, district judge and former county attorney of Colfax County from Schuyler, Nebraska
- Addison S. Tibbets, judge and vice president of the state prison association from Lincoln, Nebraska

=== Results ===
Democratic primary results
Party	Candidate	Votes	%
Democratic	Erasmus O. Garrett	15,552	51.60
Democratic	Addison S. Tibbets	8,420	27.94
Democratic	James A. Grimison	6,167	20.46

== People's Independent primary ==
=== Candidates ===
The People's Independent Party, a remnant of the earlier populist movement, chose between two of the democratic candidates for lieutenant governor since the Democratic Party and the Populist Party had run on "fusion" tickets in past elections.

=== Results ===
People's Independent primary results
Party	Candidate	Votes	%
Populist	Erasmus O. Garrett	2,573	75.30
Populist	James A. Grimison	844	24.70

== Prohibition primary ==
=== Candidates ===
Frank E. Linch ran unopposed for the Prohibition Party nomination. He was a businessman and insurance agent from Lincoln, Nebraska, and a prominent Methodist who was involved in religious and charitable organizations.

=== Results ===
Prohibition primary results
Party	Candidate	Votes	%
Prohibition	Frank E. Linch	715	100.0

== Republican primary ==
=== Candidates ===
Melville R. Hopewell, the incumbent Nebraska Lieutenant Governor from Tekamah, Nebraska, ran unopposed for the Republican Party nomination.

=== Results ===
Republican primary results
Party	Candidate	Votes	%
Republican	Melville R. Hopewell (incumbent)	48,032	100.0

== Socialist primary ==
=== Candidates ===
- Thomas Jorgenson from Florence, Nebraska
- W. C. Rodgers from Wahoo, Nebraska

=== Results ===
Socialist primary results
Party	Candidate	Votes	%
Socialist	Thomas Jorgenson	245	60.0
Socialist	W. C. Rodgers	164	40.0

== General election ==
The result of the general election was extremely close, the separation between Melville Hopewell and Erasmus O. Garrett being only 230 votes. In the gubernatorial race, Democratic candidate Ashton Shallenberger defeated Republican incumbent George L. Sheldon by a few thousand votes, leading many to think that the same would happen in the race for lieutenant governor. In fact, some newspapers called the election for Garrett after most of the results had come in. However, the election took weeks to resolve. When the election had been declared for Hopewell, Garrett initially stated he would ask the Nebraska Legislature for a recount. However, Garrett later decided not to request a recount and to concede the election to Hopewell. He wrote an open letter explaining his decision and thanking his supporters, saying that some thought enough errors could be discovered to give him the victory, but he would not challenge the result.

=== Results ===
Nebraska lieutenant gubernatorial election, 1908
Party	Candidate	Votes	%
Republican	Melville R. Hopewell (incumbent)	127,805 (Note: While the 1909 Senate Journal of the Legislature of the State of Nebraska gives Hopewell's total as 127,805, several newspaper sources list his total as 127,705.)	48.35
Democratic	Erasmus O. Garrett (Note: Cross-endorsed by the People's Independent (Populist) Party.)	127,575 (Note: While the 1909 Senate Journal of the Legislature of the State of Nebraska gives Garrett's total as 127,575, several newspaper sources list his total as 127,503.)	48.26
Prohibition	Frank E. Linch	5,469	2.07
Socialist	Thomas Jorgenson	3,484	1.32
Total votes		264,333	100.00
Republican hold			

== See also ==
- 1908 Nebraska gubernatorial election
