= 1912 Nebraska lieutenant gubernatorial election =

- November 5, 1912
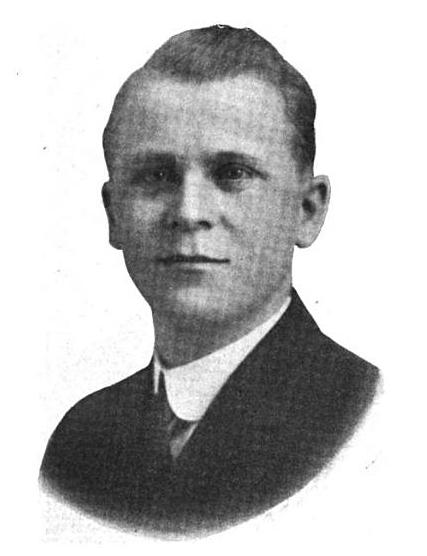

Nominee	Samuel Roy McKelvie	Herman Diers
Party	Republican	Democratic
Popular vote	123,837	109,186
Percentage	50.0%	44.1%
Lieutenant Governor before election
John H. Morehead (acting)
Democratic
Elected Lieutenant Governor
Samuel Roy McKelvie
Republican

The 1912 Nebraska lieutenant gubernatorial election was held on November 5, 1912, and featured Republican nominee Samuel Roy McKelvie defeating Democratic nominee Herman Diers as well as Socialist Party nominee W. T. Jeffryes and Prohibition Party nominee Theodore J. Shrode.

On May 2, 1911, incumbent Nebraska Lieutenant Governor Melville R. Hopewell died while in office. After the death of Hopewell, John H. Morehead was considered to be the acting lieutenant governor due to his position as president pro tempore of the Nebraska Senate based on Article V, Section 18, of the Nebraska Constitution. Morehead decided to seek the office of Governor of Nebraska and thus did not run to be officially elected as lieutenant governor in the election of 1912.

== Democratic primary ==
=== Candidates ===
Herman Diers ran unopposed for the Democratic nomination. He was a businessman and banker from Gresham, Nebraska, who was a member of the Nebraska Senate from 1909 to 1911 and a member of the Nebraska House of Representatives from 1901 to 1903.

=== Results ===
Democratic primary results
Party	Candidate	Votes	%
Democratic	Herman Diers	29,110	100.0

== Republican primary ==
=== Candidates ===
- Martin L. Fries, farmer, former businessman in the lumber industry, and former member of the Nebraska Senate from 1903 to 1907 from Arcadia, Nebraska
- L. W. Hague, lawyer from Minden, Nebraska
- Samuel Roy McKelvie, president and manager of The Nebraska Farmer newspaper and member of the Nebraska House of Representatives since 1911 from Lincoln, Nebraska
- Lorin A. Varner, lawyer, founder and publisher of the Sterling Sun newspaper, former president of the Nebraska Press Association, member of the Nebraska Senate since 1911, and former member of the Nebraska House of Representatives from 1885 to 1887 from Sterling, Nebraska

=== Results ===
Republican primary results
Party	Candidate	Votes	%
Republican	Samuel Roy McKelvie	27,268	41.93
Republican	Martin L. Fries	15,607	24.00
Republican	Lorin A. Varner	12,162	18.70
Republican	L. W. Hague	10,000	15.38

== General election ==
=== Candidates ===
- Herman Diers, Democratic nominee
- Dr. W. T. Jeffryes, Socialist nominee, physician from Horsefoot, Nebraska, a village in Rock County, Nebraska
- Samuel Roy McKelvie, Republican nominee
- Theodore J. Shrode, Prohibition nominee

=== Results ===
Nebraska lieutenant gubernatorial election, 1912
Party	Candidate	Votes	%
Republican	Samuel Roy McKelvie	123,837 (Note: The total given for McKelvie's vote in the 1913 Nebraska House of Representatives journal was 123,839.)	49.96
Democratic	Herman Diers	109,186	44.05
Socialist	W. T. Jeffryes	10,925	4.41
Prohibition	Theodore J. Shrode	3,932	1.59
Total votes		247,880	100.00
Republican gain from Democratic			

== See also ==
- 1912 Nebraska gubernatorial election
