= Gov. John Hopwood Mickey House =

Historic house in Nebraska, United States

- U.S. National Register of Historic Places
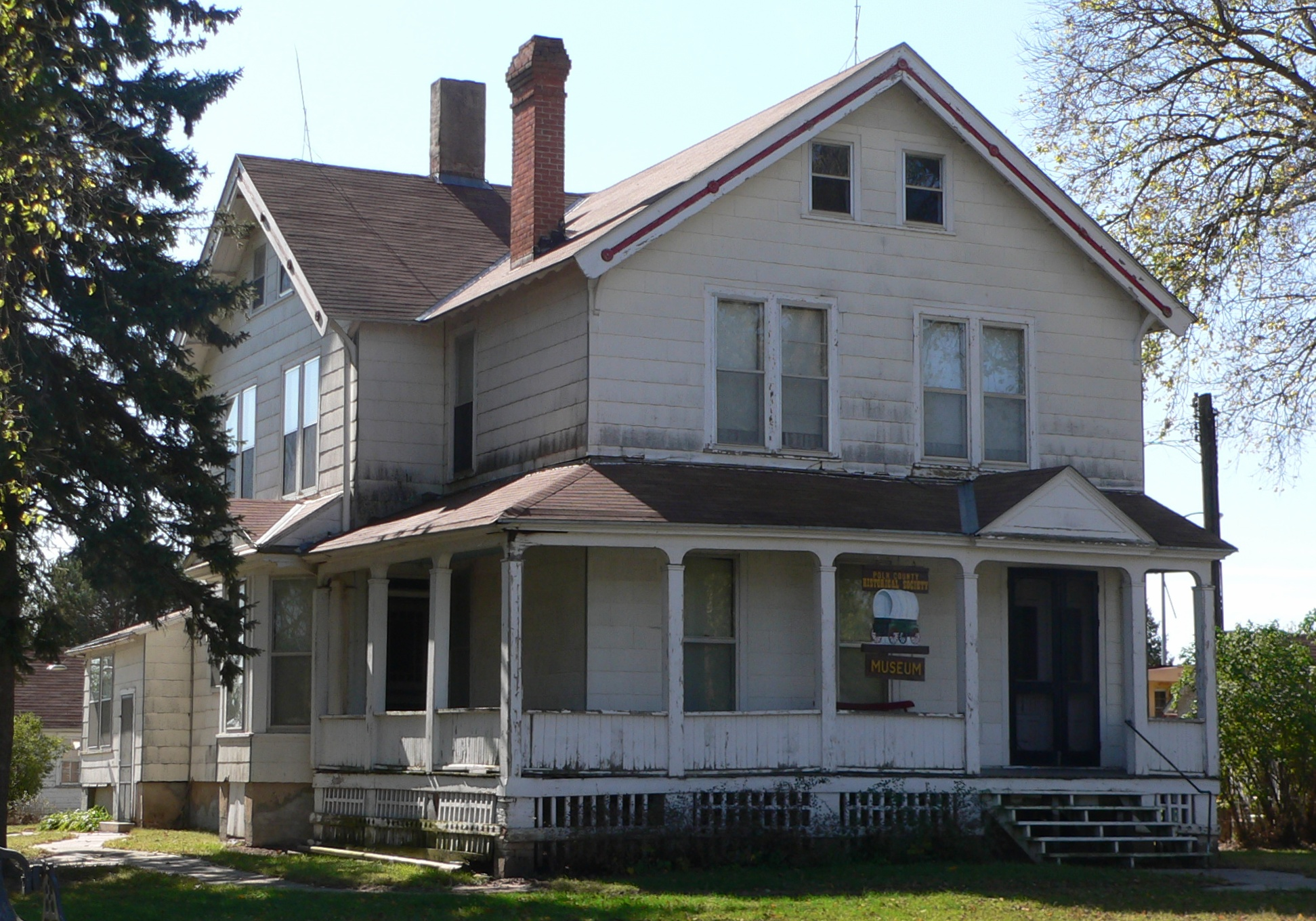

- Location within Nebraska Location within the United States
- Location: State St., Osceola, Nebraska
- Coordinates: 41°10′12″N 97°32′52″W
- Area: less than one acre
- Built: c.1883-1884
- NRHP reference No.: 77000835
- Added to NRHP: May 12, 1977

The Gov. John Hopwood Mickey House, at State St. in Osceola, Nebraska, was built in c.1883-1884. It was a home of John Hopwood Mickey. In 1977 the house was leased by, and was also known as, the Polk County Historical Museum, which includes other historic buildings that have been moved onto the property.

Alone out of the buildings on the property, the house was listed on the National Register of Historic Places in 1977.
