= 1918 United States Senate election in Nebraska =

- November 5, 1918
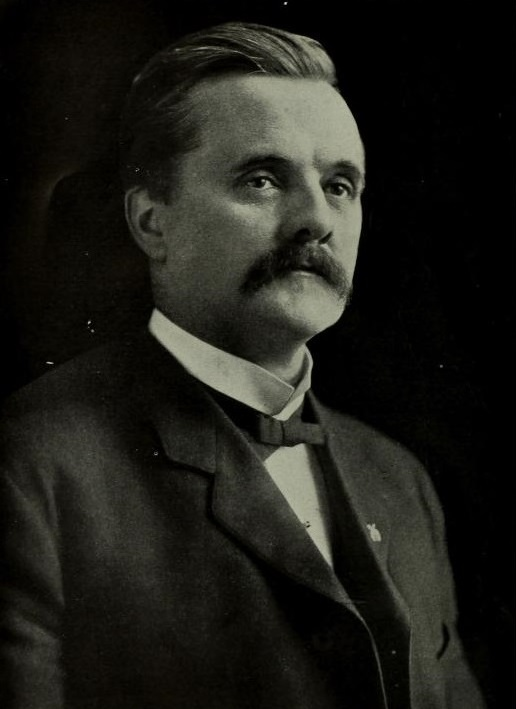

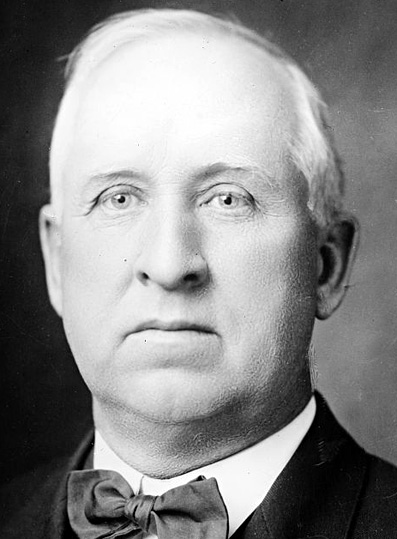
Nominee	George W. Norris	John H. Morehead
Party	Republican	Democratic
Popular vote	119,486	99,696
Percentage	54.51%	45.49%
- County results Norris: 50–60% 60–70% Morehead: 50–60% 60–70%
U.S. senator before election
George W. Norris
Republican
Elected U.S. senator
George W. Norris
Republican

The 1918 United States Senate election in Nebraska was held on November 5, 1918. Incumbent Republican Senator George W. Norris sought re-election in his first popular election. He won the Republican primary with a 35% plurality and faced former Governor John H. Morehead, the Democratic nominee, in the general election. Owing to nationwide Republican strength in the 1918 elections, Norris defeated Morehead with 55% of the vote.

== Democratic primary ==
=== Candidates ===
- John H. Morehead, former Governor of Nebraska
- Richard Lee Metcalfe, former Military Governor of the Panama Canal Zone
- Edgar Howard, Lieutenant Governor of Nebraska
- Willis E. Reed, Attorney General of Nebraska
- William B. Price, Lincoln attorney

=== Results ===
Democratic primary results
Party	Candidate	Votes	%
Democratic	John H. Morehead	29,581	48.82%
Democratic	Richard L. Metcalfe	12,506	20.64%
Democratic	Edgar Howard	8,263	13.64%
Democratic	Willis E. Reed	7,796	12.87%
Democratic	William B. Price	2,444	4.03%
Total votes		60,590	100.00%

== Republican primary ==
=== Candidates ===
- George W. Norris, incumbent Senator
- Charles H. Sloan, U.S. Representative from Nebraska's 4th congressional district
- Ross L. Hammond, editor of the Fremont Tribune, former Collector of Internal Revenue for the District of Nebraska
- William Madgett, Mayor of Hastings
- David Mercer, former U.S. Representative from Nebraska's 2nd congressional district

=== Results ===
Republican primary results
Party	Candidate	Votes	%
Republican	George W. Norris	23,715	35.86%
Republican	Charles H. Sloan	17,070	25.82%
Republican	Ross L. Hammond	16,948	25.63%
Republican	William Madgett	4,301	6.50%
Republican	David Mercer	4,089	6.18%
Total votes		66,123	100.00%

== General election ==
=== Results ===
1918 United States Senate election in Nebraska
Party	Candidate	Votes	%
Republican	George W. Norris (inc.)	120,086	54.64%
Democratic	John H. Morehead	99,690	45.36%
Total votes		219,776	100.00%
Republican hold			
