= Chester Hardy Aldrich =

American judge

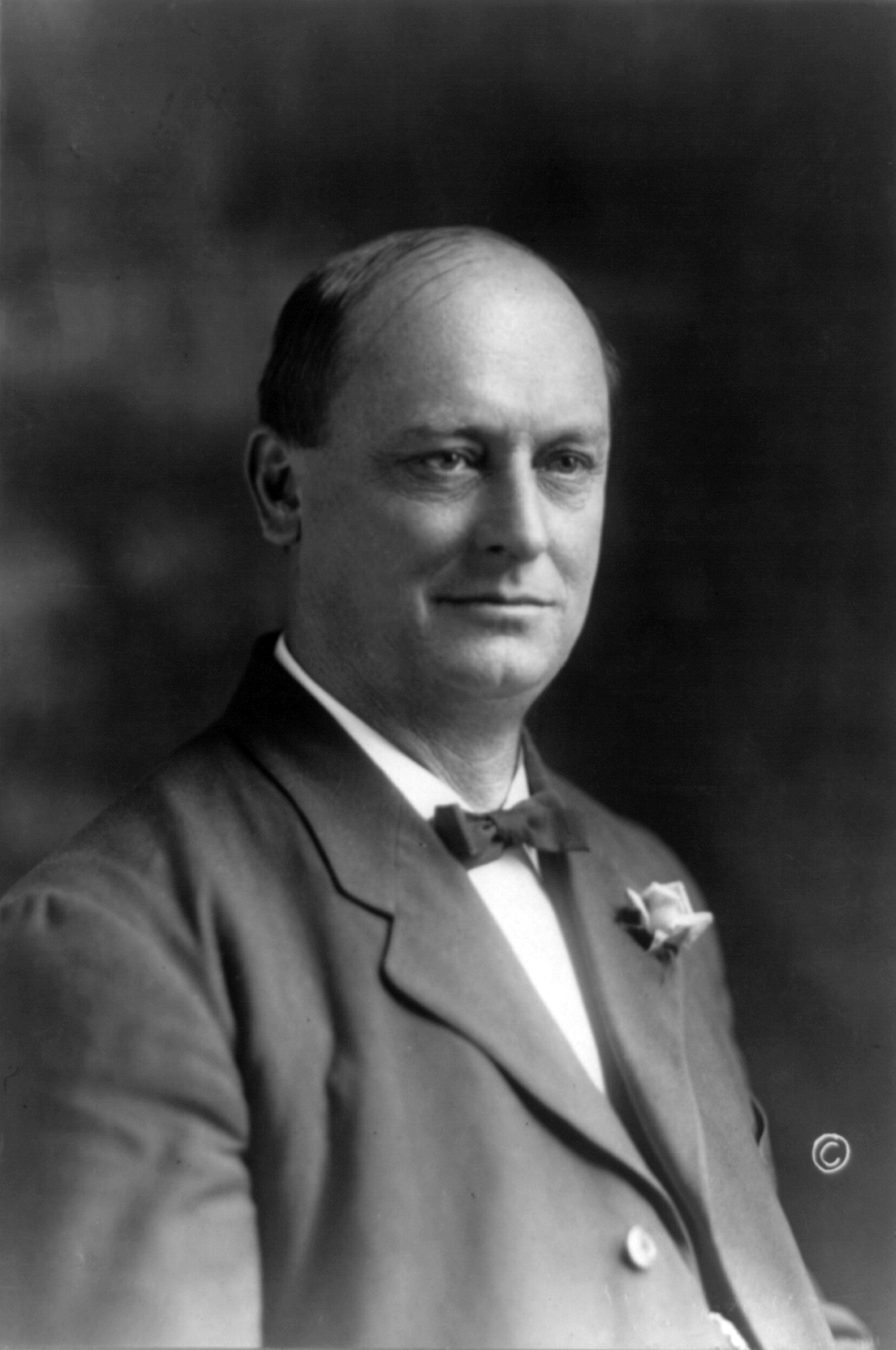

16th Governor of Nebraska
- In office January 5, 1911 – January 9, 1913
- Lieutenant: Melville R. Hopewell (1911); John H. Morehead (acting) (1911–13)
- Preceded by: Ashton C. Shallenberger
- Succeeded by: John H. Morehead

Member of the Nebraska State Senate
- In office 1907

Associate Justice of the Nebraska Supreme Court
- In office 1918–1924

Personal details
- Born: November 10, 1863 Pierpont, Ohio, U.S.
- Died: March 10, 1924 (aged 60) Superior, Nebraska, U.S.
- Party: Republican
- Spouse: Sylvia Estelle Stroman
- Education: Ohio State University

Chester Hardy Aldrich (November 10, 1863 – March 10, 1924) was an American politician. A member of the Republican Party, he served as the 16th governor of Nebraska and as a justice of the Nebraska Supreme Court.

== Personal life ==
Aldrich was born in Pierpont in Ashtabula County, Ohio. He married Sylvia Estelle Stroman on June 4, 1889, and they had five children. He was a member of the Methodist Episcopal Church, a Freemason and a Knight Templar. He died in office on March 10, 1924.

== Education ==
After he graduated from the prep school at Hillsdale College in Michigan, Aldrich entered the Ohio State University as a freshman in 1884. While at Ohio State he became a champion orator, served as an editor of The Lantern, and in 1886 became the captain of an abortive first attempt at forming an Ohio State University football team. He graduated from Ohio State in 1888 with an A.B.

In a commencement address, delivered at his university soon after he was elected governor of Nebraska, he offered his views on the topic of "Progressive Citizenship."

== Political life ==
Aldrich settled in Ulysses, Nebraska, where he worked as a high school principal and livestock rancher while he studied law. He passed the Nebraska Bar in 1890 and began practicing law in David City. He served as mayor of David City and was elected to the Nebraska State Senate in 1906. As a state senator, he wrote the Railway Commission Law and the Aldrich Freight Rate Law, which attacked the power of the Nebraska railroad trusts. When the laws were brought to Federal Court, Aldrich personally served as counsel for the state and the laws were sustained.

In 1910, with support from Populist Democrat William Jennings Bryan, and over opposition of the trusts, Aldrich was elected governor of Nebraska. During his tenure as governor, a co-operative association act was sanctioned; a board of control for state institutions was established; a sanitary health bill was authorized; and a road program was initiated.

In 1911, Aldrich appointed a three-man commission to arrange, compile, and codify the Nebraska state statutes. Alfred M. Post became chairman of the commission, serving with Edwin L. King and John H. Broady.

Aldrich served as governor until 1913. In 1918, he was elected as a justice of the Nebraska Supreme Court and remained in that position until his death.

Party political offices
Preceded by George L. Sheldon	Republican nominee for Governor of Nebraska; 1910, 1912	Succeeded by Robert B. Howell
Political offices
Preceded by Ashton C. Shallenberger	Governor of Nebraska; 1911–1913	Succeeded by John H. Morehead
