= Edwin L. King =

Prominent Nebraska attorney, state legislator

Edwin Laverne King
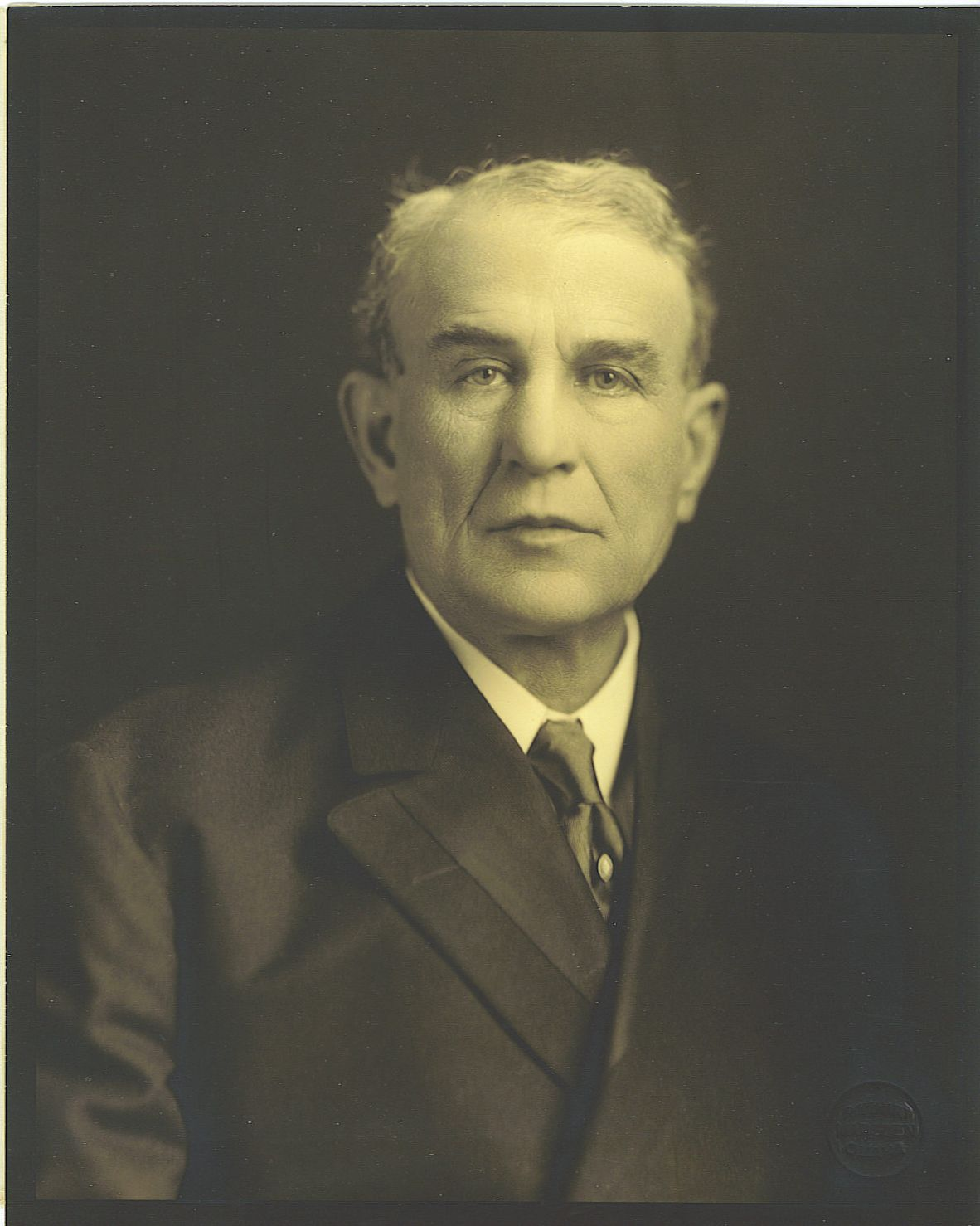

State Legislator
- In office 1885–1886
- In office 1907–1912

Personal details
- Born: February 4, 1855 Bedford, Ohio, U.S.
- Died: April 22, 1921 (aged 66) Osceola, Nebraska, U.S.
- Party: Republican
- Spouse: Abby Fowle
- Education: Iowa State College, Des Moines Law School
- Occupation: Attorney, Politician

Edwin L. King (February 4, 1855 – April 22, 1921) was a Nebraska attorney who served in both houses of the state legislature; was instrumental in passage of legislation improving public education and regulating the railroad as a public utility; and was a revisor and codifier of the state's laws.

== Early life ==
Edwin Laverne King was born February 4, 1855, in Bedford, Cuyahoga County, Ohio, the son of a farmer whose ancestors were emigres to the Connecticut Western Reserve in the early 19th century. In 1867 the family moved to Benton County in central eastern Iowa. King graduated from Iowa State College in 1877 and from the Des Moines Law School the following year, and entered law practice in Vinton, the county seat of Benton County. In July 1879, King moved to Osceola, Nebraska, where he spent the rest of his life.

== Career ==
King early established himself in the community. In addition to his law practice, he was an original trustee of Osceola upon the community's incorporation August 26, 1881. Also that year, another influential citizen, John H. Mickey, incorporated Osceola Bank, the first bank in Polk County. King was appointed vice-president of the bank, reflecting a relationship between the two men that endured for more than twenty years. King was a city councilman and served as a member of the Osceola School Board for 18 years, many years as its president. He held the office of Polk County Attorney twice, 1887–1888, and 1915–1916.

== Legislative career and accomplishments ==
King served in the Nebraska House of Representatives in 1885–1886, and in the State Senate from 1907 to 1912.

The 1907 Nebraska legislative session produced much reform legislation. Senator King was instrumental in the efforts.

King framed and championed an anti-pass law, limiting the issuance of free railroad passes, a custom which was said to have led to abuses such as influencing legislation and the administration of justice. Hand in hand with this, King supported passage of the Nebraska Railway Commission law, which created the regulatory agency to investigate and control the railroads and other public corporations.

He introduced legislation that became known as "King’s High School Bill," which sought to expand educational opportunities by allowing for four years of high school for all youth. This enabled young people in rural communities to attend public schools in the towns, supported by tuition charges of $.75 paid by counties.

King was also the author of the Corporation Tax Law, imposing for the first time a tax on corporate earnings.

In the 1909-1910 legislative session, King was chairman of the Judiciary Committee.

During the term of Nebraska Governor John H. Mickey (1903–1907), King served as his legal advisor. Both Osceola residents, the two had enjoyed a long business relationship.

== Codification ==
In 1911, Nebraska Governor Chester Hardy Aldrich appointed King one of three members of a commission to arrange, compile, and codify state statutes for the first time in the state's history. He was joined by state judges A.M. Post and J.H. Broady. They produced the Nebraska Revised Statutes of 1913, a codification, with regular statutory updates and revisions, that remains intact today. King was recognized as the one who did a disproportionate amount of work on the commission.

== Political life ==
King attended the 1912 Republican national convention in Chicago as a delegate from Nebraska. He was regarded as an "ardent progressive," but disapproved of Theodore Roosevelt's bolting the party that year. From 1912 to 1914, he served as chairman of the Republican State Committee. In 1916 King presided over the Republican state convention.

== Personal life ==
In 1880 King married Abby Fowle of Clarksville, Iowa, whom he had met in college. They had two children, Edna Laura (1881-1949), and William Ross (1886-1983).

King was a Mason, a past master, trustee, and treasurer of Osceola Lodge No. 65, A.F. and A.M., and was a member of Modern Woodmen of America.

King died suddenly of an apoplectic stroke at his home, April 22, 1921, at age 66. Memorial services were held in the Osceola Auditorium. All business in the community was suspended during the services.
