= 1912 Nebraska gubernatorial election =

- November 5, 1912
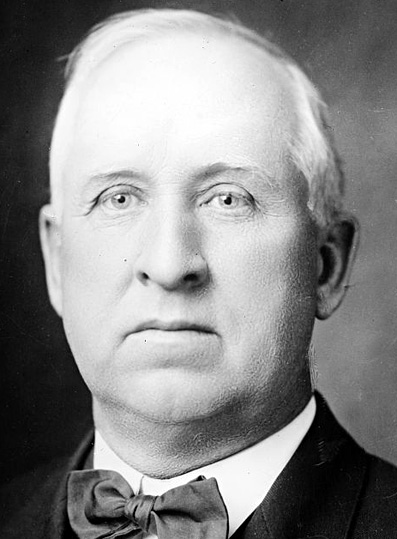

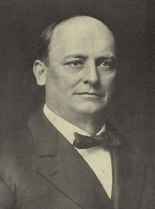
Nominee	John H. Morehead	Chester Hardy Aldrich
Party	Democratic	Republican
Alliance	Populist	Progressive
Popular vote	123,997	114,075
Percentage	49.27%	45.33%
- County results Morehead: 40–50% 50–60% 60–70% Aldrich: 40–50% 50–60% 60–70%
Governor before election
Chester Hardy Aldrich
Republican
Elected Governor
John H. Morehead
Democratic

The 1912 Nebraska gubernatorial election was held on November 5, 1912.

Incumbent Republican Governor Chester Hardy Aldrich was defeated for re-election by Democratic nominee John H. Morehead.

== Primary elections ==
Primary elections were held on April 19, 1912.

=== Democratic primary ===
==== Candidates ====
- Richard Lee Metcalfe, newspaper editor
- John H. Morehead, President pro tempore of the State Senate

==== Withdrew ====
- Charles W. Pool

==== Results ====
Democratic primary results
Party	Candidate	Votes	%
Democratic	John H. Morehead	26,279	54.36
Democratic	Richard Lee Metcalfe	22,065	45.64
Total votes		48,344	100.00

=== People's Independent primary ===
==== Candidates ====
- Richard Lee Metcalfe, newspaper editor
- John H. Morehead, President pro tempore of the State Senate

==== Results ====
People's Independent primary results
Party	Candidate	Votes	%
Populist	Richard Lee Metcalfe	606	60.30
Populist	John H. Morehead	399	39.70
Total votes		1,005	100.00

Metcalfe withdrew in favour of Morehead.

=== Prohibition primary ===
==== Candidates ====
- Nathan Wilson

==== Results ====
Prohibition primary results
Party	Candidate	Votes	%
Prohibition	Nathan Wilson	490	100.00
Total votes		490	100.00

=== Republican primary ===
==== Candidates ====
- Chester Hardy Aldrich, incumbent Governor
- Jesse S. Newton, merchant

==== Results ====
Republican primary results
Party	Candidate	Votes	%
Republican	Chester Hardy Aldrich (incumbent)	48,981	67.42
Republican	Jesse S. Newton	23,673	32.58
Total votes		72,654	100.00

=== Socialist primary ===
==== Candidates ====
- Clyde J. Wright, Socialist candidate for Governor in 1910

==== Results ====
Socialist primary results
Party	Candidate	Votes	%
Socialist	Clyde J. Wright	1,559	100.00
Total votes		1,559	100.00

== General election ==
=== Candidates ===
Major party candidates

- John H. Morehead, Democratic and People's Independent
- Chester Hardy Aldrich, Republican and Progressive

Other candidates

- Nathan Wilson, Prohibition
- Clyde J. Wright, Socialist

=== Results ===
1912 Nebraska gubernatorial election
Party	Candidate	Votes	%
Democratic	John H. Morehead	123,997	49.27%
Republican	Chester Hardy Aldrich (incumbent)	114,075	45.33%
Socialist	Clyde J. Wright	9,964	3.96%
Prohibition	Nathan Wilson	3,642	1.45%
Majority		9,922	3.94%
Turnout		251,678	
Democratic gain from Republican			

== See also ==
- 1912 Nebraska lieutenant gubernatorial election

== Bibliography ==
- Sheldon, Addison E., ed. (1915). The Nebraska Blue Book and Historical Register 1915. Lincoln: State Journal Company.
