= 1928 United States Senate election in Nebraska =

- November 6, 1928
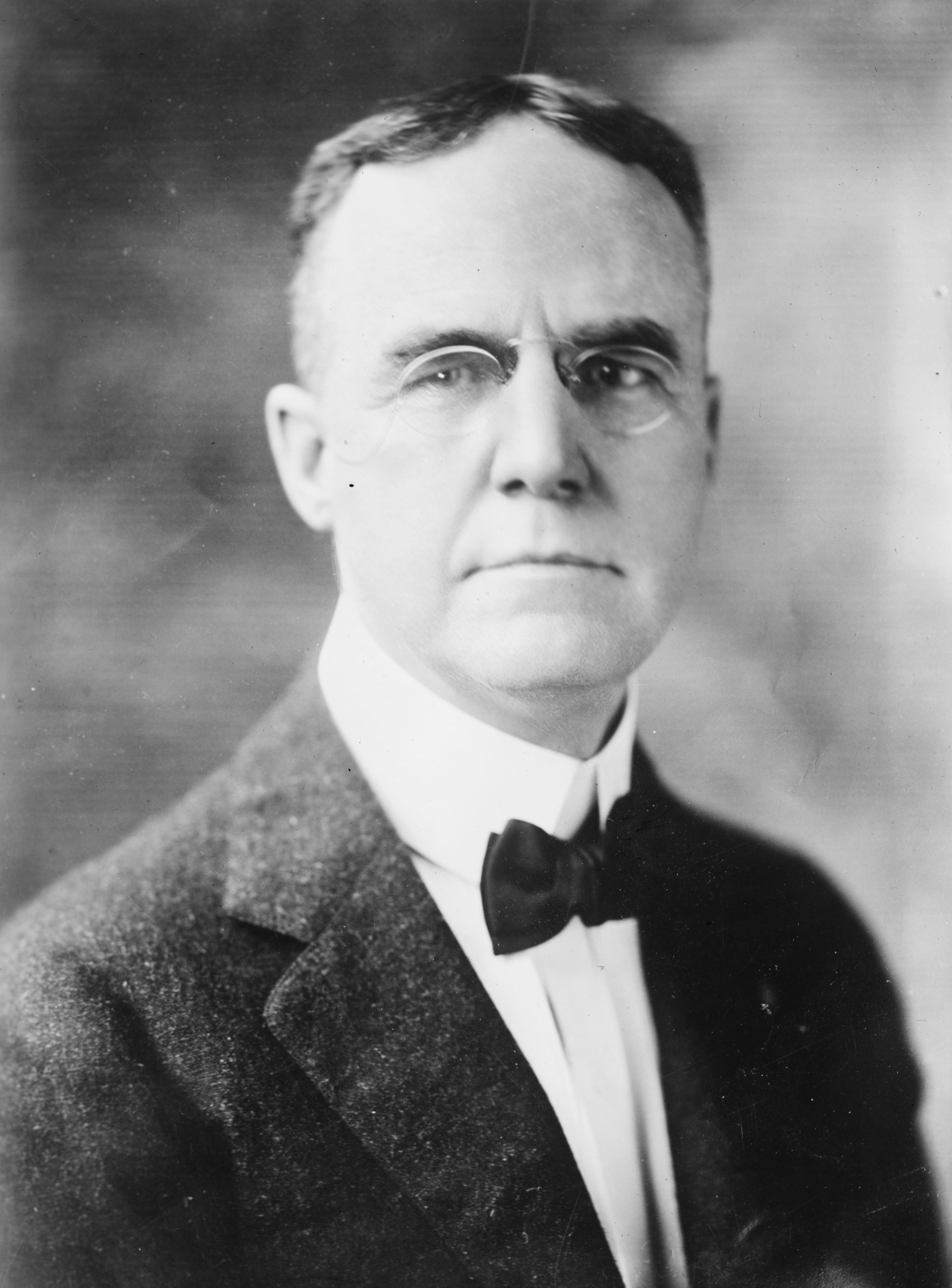

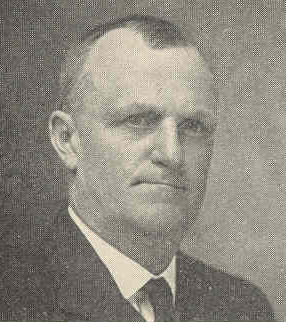
Nominee	Robert B. Howell	Richard L. Metcalfe
Party	Republican	Democratic
Popular vote	324,014	204,737
Percentage	61.28%	38.72%
- County results Howell: 50–60% 60–70% 70–80% 80–90% Metcalfe: 50–60%
U.S. senator before election
Robert B. Howell
Republican
Elected U.S. Senator
Robert B. Howell
Republican

The 1928 United States Senate election in Nebraska took place on November 6, 1928. The incumbent Republican, Robert B. Howell, was re-elected by a wide margin to a second term. He defeated Richard Lee Metcalfe. Howell underperformed Herbert Hoover, who won the state with 63.19% in the presidential election.

== Democratic primary ==
=== Candidates ===
- Richard Lee Metcalfe, former Military Governor of the Panama Canal Zone
- E. E. Placek, former State Senator

=== Results ===
Democratic primary results
Party	Candidate	Votes	%
Democratic	Richard Lee Metcalfe	37,630	57.38%
Democratic	E. E. Placek	27,929	42.59%
Democratic	Scattering	17	0.03%
Total votes		65,576	100.00%

== Republican primary ==
=== Candidates ===
- Robert B. Howell, incumbent Senator
- Ora S. Spillman, Attorney General of Nebraska

=== Results ===
Republican primary results
Party	Candidate	Votes	%
Republican	Robert B. Howell (inc.)	82,672	59.33%
Republican	Ora S. Spillman	56,658	40.66%
Republican	Scattering	12	0.01%
Total votes		139,342	100.00%

== General election ==
1928 United States Senate election in Nebraska
Party	Candidate	Votes	%	±%
Republican	Robert B. Howell (inc.)	324,014	61.28%	+4.44%
Democratic	Richard Lee Metcalfe	204,737	38.72%	+0.48%
Write-in		1	0.00%	—
Majority		119,277	22.56%	+3.96%
Total votes		528,752	100.00%	
Republican hold				
