= Robert B. Howell =

American politician

Robert Beecher Howell
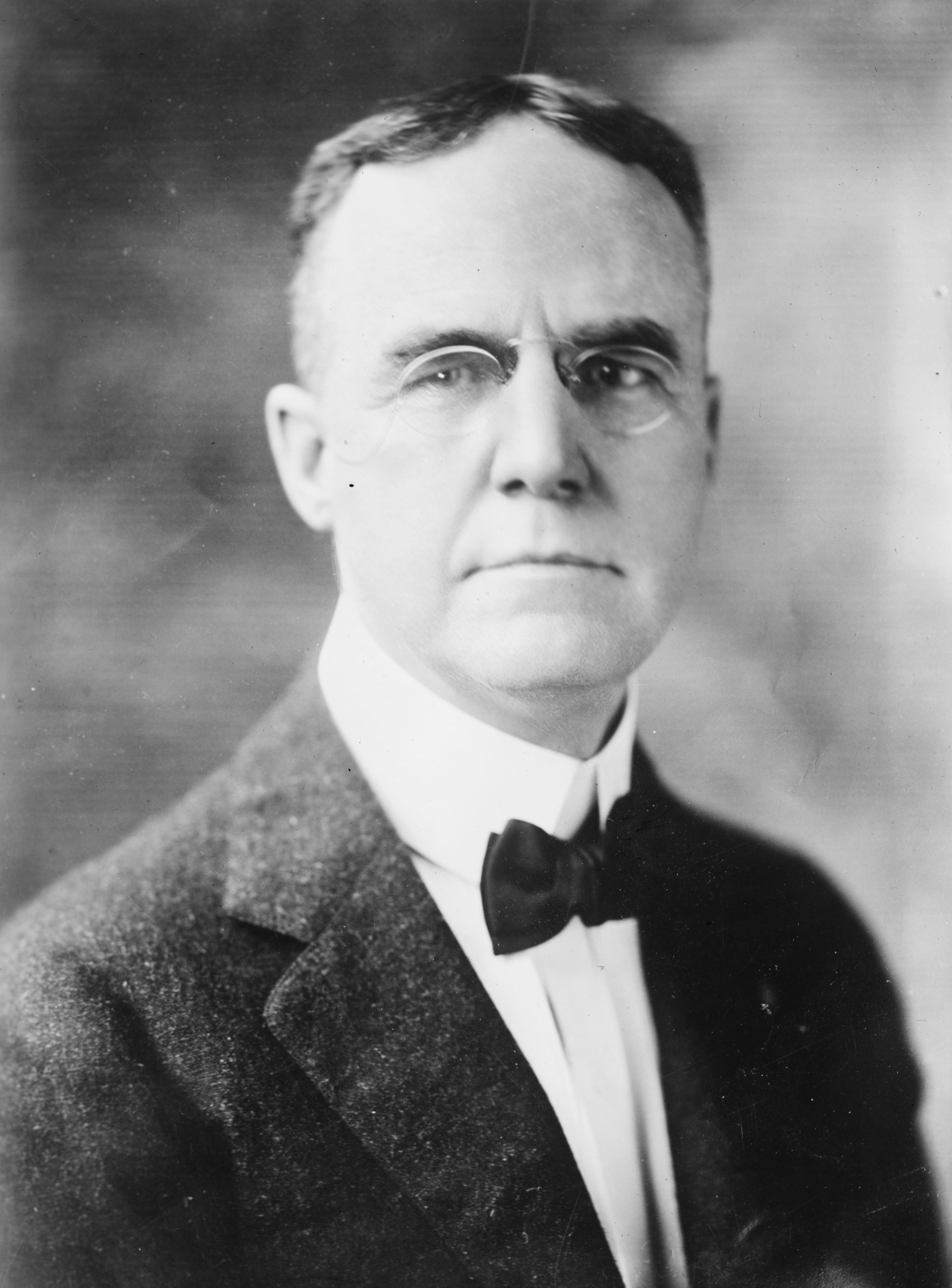
- Howell c. 1920–1925

United States Senator from Nebraska
- In office March 4, 1923 – March 11, 1933
- Preceded by: Gilbert Hitchcock
- Succeeded by: William H. Thompson

Personal details
- Born: January 21, 1864 Adrian, Michigan, U.S.
- Died: March 11, 1933 (aged 69) Washington, D.C., U.S.
- Party: Republican

Robert Beecher Howell (January 21, 1864 – March 11, 1933) was an American politician. He was born in Adrian, Michigan. He graduated from the United States Naval Academy in Annapolis, Maryland in 1885. Afterwards, he went to the Detroit School of Law. He moved to Omaha, Nebraska for his health in 1888.

A Nebraska progressive Republican, Howell was first a Nebraska state engineer from 1895 to 1896 and an engineer for the city of Omaha from 1896 to 1897. He was a lieutenant in the United States Navy during the Spanish–American War. He was elected to the state senate in 1902 to 1904, and then served on the Omaha Water Board and its successor, the Metropolitan Utilities District from 1904 to 1923, of which he was the chair from 1912 to 1923. Howell was elected to the Republican National Committee in 1912, 1916, and 1920.

After an unsuccessful bid for Governor of Nebraska in 1914, he served as a lieutenant in the United States Naval Reserve Force from 1917 to 1923. In 1921, he became the chairman of the radio commission in the United States Post Office Department. He was elected to the United States Senate in 1922, where he served until March 11, 1933, when he died in office. During his time in the Senate, he was the chairman of the Committee on Claims (1927 to 1933).

In March 1921, Howell suggested to Postmaster General Will H. Hays that the U.S. government should establish its own official broadcasting stations. In early September 1921, Howell conferred with Hays prior to leaving for Europe to conduct a survey of radio broadcasting development. A contemporary wire report stated that Hayes expressed the hope that "in the near future radio phones could be utilized to broadcast weather and market reports and other information". Shortly thereafter the Commerce Department, which regulated radio at this time, issued a regulation formally creating a radio broadcasting service classification. Effective December 1, 1921, broadcasting stations could be established which held Limited Commercial licenses that authorized operation on two designated broadcasting wavelengths: 360 meters (833 kHz) for "entertainment", and 485 meters (619 kHz) for "market and weather reports".

On December 29, 1921, a license with the randomly assigned call letters WOU was issued to Robert B. Howell, for operation in Omaha on both 360 and 485 meters. This was the first broadcasting station to be authorized to broadcast on the 485-meter "market and weather report" wavelength, and also the first broadcasting station in the state of Nebraska. In early 1922, station ownership was transferred to the Metropolitan Utilities District. WOU was subsequently deleted on June 23, 1923.

In August 1928, Howell was issued a license for portable broadcasting station, KGIF, which was placed in an automobile, and used to broadcast speeches after stopping in various towns, as part of Howell's successful senatorial re-election campaign. This station was deleted in May of the following year.

He was married to Alice C. Howell.

== See also ==
- List of members of the United States Congress who died in office (1900–1949)

Party political offices
Preceded by Chester Hardy Aldrich	Republican nominee for Governor of Nebraska; 1914	Succeeded by Abraham L. Sutton
Preceded by John L. Kennedy	Republican nominee for U.S. Senator from Nebraska (Class 1); 1922, 1928	Succeeded by J.H. Kemp
U.S. Senate
Preceded by Gilbert Hitchcock	U.S. senator (Class 1) from Nebraska; 1923–1933; Served alongside: George W. Norris	Succeeded by William Henry Thompson
