= 1914 Nebraska lieutenant gubernatorial election =

- November 3, 1914
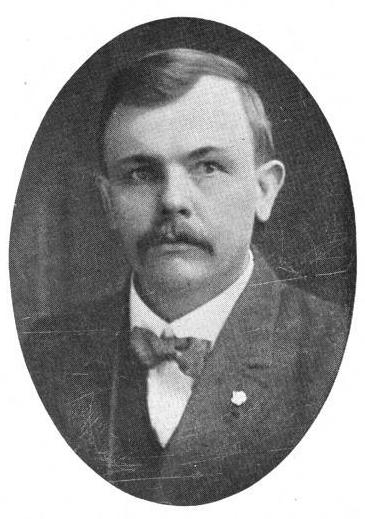

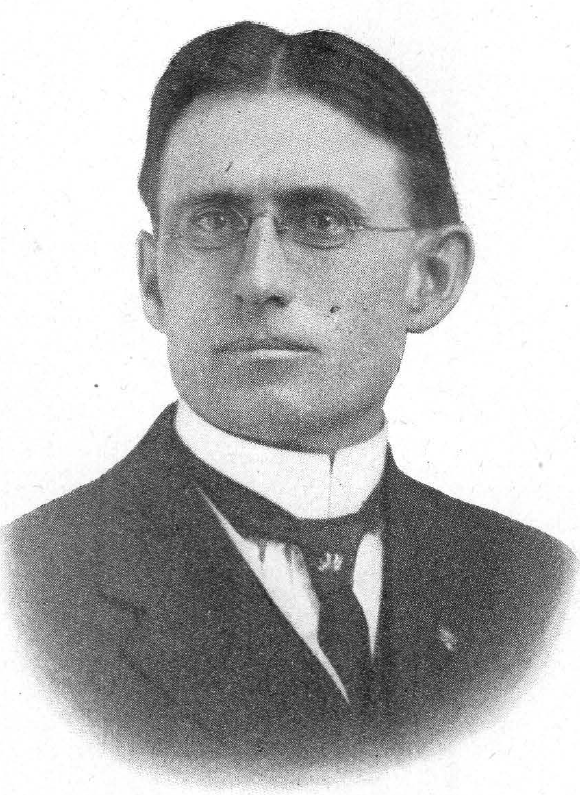
Nominee	James Pearson	Walter V. Hoagland
Party	Democratic	Republican
Popular vote	106,340	103,090
Percentage	45.8%	44.4%
Lieutenant Governor before election
Samuel R. McKelvie
Republican
Elected Lieutenant Governor
James Pearson
Democratic

The 1914 Nebraska lieutenant gubernatorial election was held on November 3, 1914, and featured Democratic nominee James Pearson defeating Republican nominee Walter V. Hoagland as well as Progressive Party nominee G. L. E. Klingbiel, Socialist Party nominee Glen H. Abel, and Prohibition Party nominee Henry F. J. Hockenberger. Incumbent Nebraska Lieutenant Governor Samuel R. McKelvie did not seek reelection.

== Democratic primary ==
=== Candidates ===
- James Pearson, farmer and member of the Nebraska House of Representatives since 1913 from Moorefield, Nebraska
- George W. Potts, farmer, businessman, former county treasurer of Pawnee County, and member of the Nebraska House of Representatives since 1911 from Du Bois, Nebraska
- Edgar F. Snavely, lawyer and businessman from Lincoln, Nebraska

=== Results ===
Democratic primary results
Party	Candidate	Votes	%
Democratic	James Pearson	22,859	41.73
Democratic	George W. Potts	19,659	35.89
Democratic	Edgar F. Snavely	12,257	22.38

== People's Independent primary ==
=== Candidates ===
The People's Independent Party, a remnant of the earlier Populist party movement, chose between two of the democratic candidates for lieutenant governor.

=== Results ===
People's Independent primary results
Party	Candidate	Votes	%
Populist	James Pearson	659	57.66
Populist	George W. Potts	484	42.34

== Republican primary ==
=== Candidates ===
- L. P. Albright, state bank examiner from Red Cloud, Nebraska
- Walter V. Hoagland, lawyer, bankruptcy referee, and member of the Nebraska Senate since 1911 from North Platte, Nebraska
- Franklin A. Shotwell, lawyer and former assistant Douglas County attorney from Florence, Nebraska
- A. J. Vanalstine

=== Results ===
Republican primary results
Party	Candidate	Votes	%
Republican	Walter V. Hoagland	23,958	37.99
Republican	Franklin A. Shotwell	19,213	30.47
Republican	L. P. Albright	14,706	23.32
Republican	A. J. Vanalstine	5,182	8.22

== General election ==
=== Candidates ===
- Glen H. Abel, Socialist nominee
- Walter V. Hoagland, Republican nominee
- Henry F. J. Hockenberger, Prohibition nominee from Columbus, Nebraska
- G. L. E. Klingbiel, Progressive nominee from Omaha, Nebraska
- James Pearson, Democratic and People's Independent nominee

=== Results ===
Nebraska lieutenant gubernatorial election, 1914
Party	Candidate	Votes	%
Democratic	James Pearson (Note: Cross-endorsed by the People's Independent (Populist) Party.)	106,340	45.75
Republican	Walter V. Hoagland	103,090	44.35
Progressive	G. L. E. Klingbiel	10,747	4.62
Socialist	Glen H. Abel	7,642	3.29
Prohibition	Henry F. J. Hockenberger	4,614	1.99
Total votes		232,433	100.00
Democratic gain from Republican			

== See also ==
- 1914 Nebraska gubernatorial election
