= 1906 Nebraska gubernatorial election =

- November 6, 1906
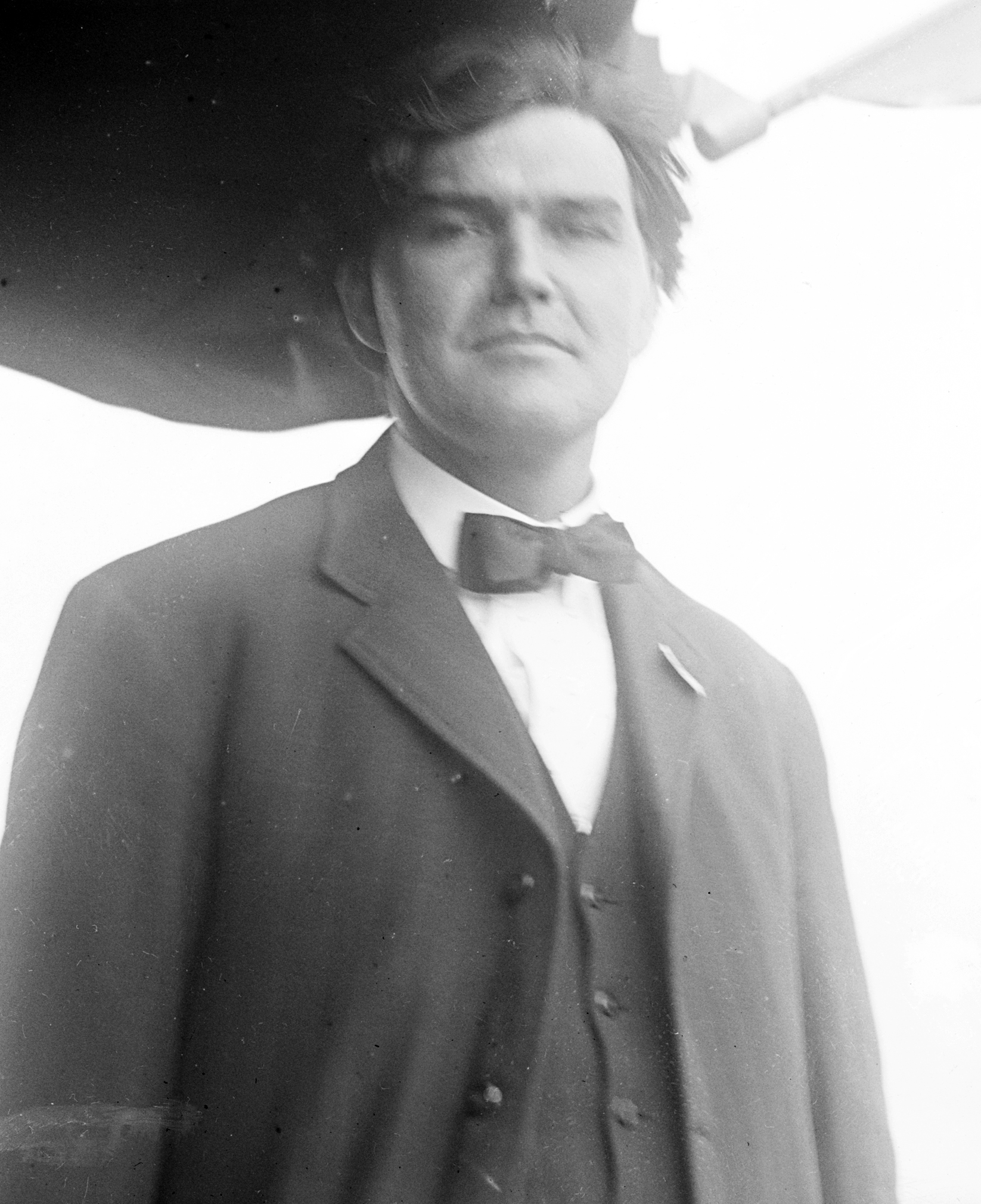

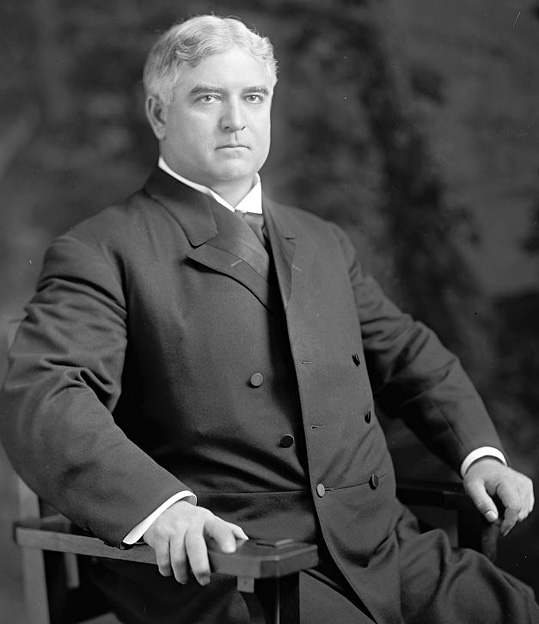
Nominee	George L. Sheldon	Ashton C. Shallenberger
Party	Republican	Democratic
Alliance		Populist
Popular vote	97,858	84,885
Percentage	51.27%	44.48%
- County results Sheldon: 40–50% 50–60% 60–70% Shallenberger: 40–50% 50–60% 60–70%
Governor before election
John H. Mickey
Republican
Elected Governor
George L. Sheldon
Republican

The 1906 Nebraska gubernatorial election was held on November 6, 1906.

Incumbent Republican Governor John H. Mickey did not stand for re-election.

Republican nominee George L. Sheldon defeated Democratic and Populist fusion nominee Ashton C. Shallenberger with 51.27% of the vote.

== General election ==
=== Candidates ===
Major party candidates

- Ashton C. Shallenberger, Democratic and People's Independent fusion candidate, former U.S. Congressman
- George L. Sheldon, Republican, incumbent State Senator

Other candidates

- Harry T. Sutton, Prohibition, head of the Department of Eloquence at Cotner College
- Elisha Taylor, Socialist

=== Results ===
1906 Nebraska gubernatorial election
Party	Candidate	Votes	%
Republican	George L. Sheldon	97,858	51.27%
Democratic	Ashton C. Shallenberger	84,885	44.48%
Prohibition	Harry T. Sutton	5,106	2.68%
Socialist	Elisha Taylor	2,999	1.57%
Scattering		5	0.00%
Majority		12,973	6.79%
Turnout		190,853	
Republican hold			

== See also ==
- 1906 Nebraska lieutenant gubernatorial election
