= 1904 Nebraska lieutenant gubernatorial election =

- November 8, 1904

Nominee	Edmund G. McGilton	Adelbert Townsend
Party	Republican	Populist
Alliance		Democratic
Popular vote	120,514	90,673
Percentage	54.0%	40.6%
Lieutenant Governor before election
Edmund G. McGilton
Republican
Elected Lieutenant Governor
Edmund G. McGilton
Republican

The 1904 Nebraska lieutenant gubernatorial election was held on November 8, 1904, and featured incumbent Nebraska Lieutenant Governor Edmund G. McGilton, a Republican, defeating Adelbert Townsend, the Populist and Democratic fusion nominee, as well as Prohibition nominee Isaiah Lightner and Socialist nominee Thomas Carroll.

== General election ==
=== Candidates ===
- Thomas Carroll, Socialist candidate from Hastings, Nebraska
- Isaiah Lightner, Prohibition candidate, farmer from Monroe, Nebraska, president of the Monroe Telephone Company, and Prohibition nominee for lieutenant governor in 1902
- Edmund G. McGilton, Republican candidate, incumbent Nebraska Lieutenant Governor from Omaha, Nebraska
- Dr. Adelbert Townsend, Populist/Democratic fusion candidate, physician from Campbell, Nebraska

=== Results ===
Nebraska lieutenant gubernatorial election, 1904
Party	Candidate	Votes	%
Republican	Edmund G. McGilton (incumbent)	120,514	53.95
Populist	Adelbert Townsend	90,673	40.59
Prohibition	Isaiah Lightner	6,159	2.76
Socialist	Thomas Carroll	6,029	2.70
Scattering		2	
Total votes		223,377	100.00
Republican hold			

== See also ==
- 1904 Nebraska gubernatorial election
