= 1906 Nebraska lieutenant gubernatorial election =

- November 6, 1906
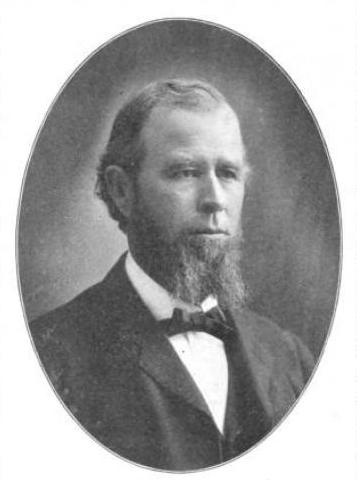

Nominee	Melville R. Hopewell	William H. Green
Party	Republican	Democratic
Alliance		Populist
Popular vote	97,972	82,298
Percentage	51.7%	43.4%
Lieutenant Governor before election
Edmund G. McGilton
Republican
Elected Lieutenant Governor
Melville R. Hopewell
Republican

The 1906 Nebraska lieutenant gubernatorial election was held on November 6, 1906, and featured Republican nominee Melville R. Hopewell, defeating William H. Green, the Democratic and Populist fusion nominee, as well as Prohibition nominee J. D. Forsythe and Socialist nominee C. A. Howe.

== General election ==
=== Candidates ===
- Rev. J. D. Forsythe, Prohibition candidate, pastor from University Place, Nebraska
- William H. Green, Democratic/Populist fusion candidate, editor of the Creighton Liberal newspaper and dealer of agricultural implements from Creighton, Nebraska
- Melville R. Hopewell, Republican candidate, lawyer, farmer, former banker, and former district court judge from Tekamah, Nebraska, who was nominated over W. W. Young at the Republican convention
- C. A. Howe, Socialist candidate from North Platte, Nebraska

=== Results ===
Nebraska lieutenant gubernatorial election, 1906
Party	Candidate	Votes	%
Republican	Melville R. Hopewell	97,972	51.68
Democratic	William H. Green	82,298	43.41
Prohibition	J. D. Forsythe	5,967	3.15
Socialist	C. A. Howe	3,331	1.76
Scattering		3	
Total votes		189,571	100.00
Republican hold			

== See also ==
- 1906 Nebraska gubernatorial election
