= 1922 United States Senate election in Nebraska =

- November 7, 1922
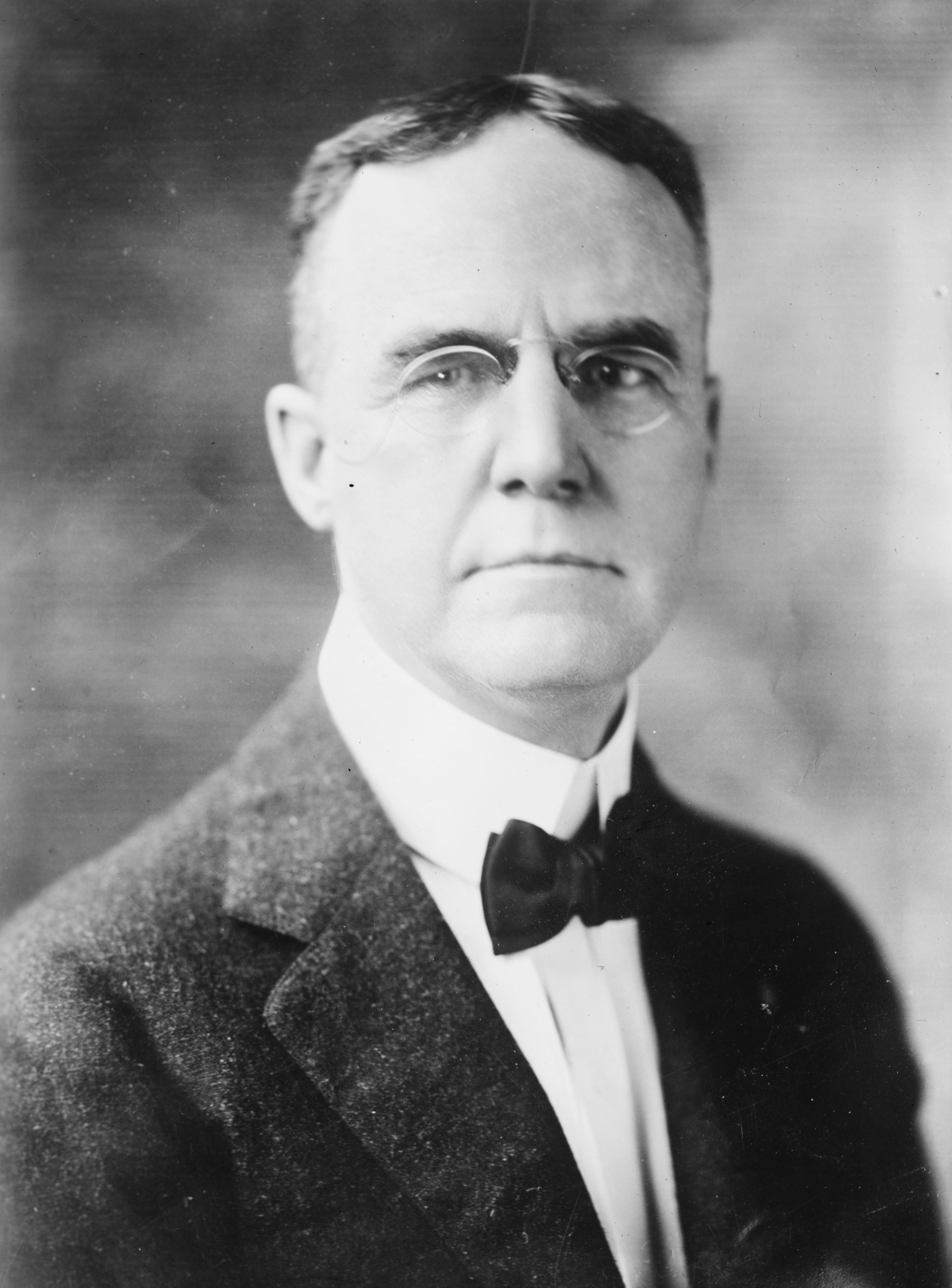

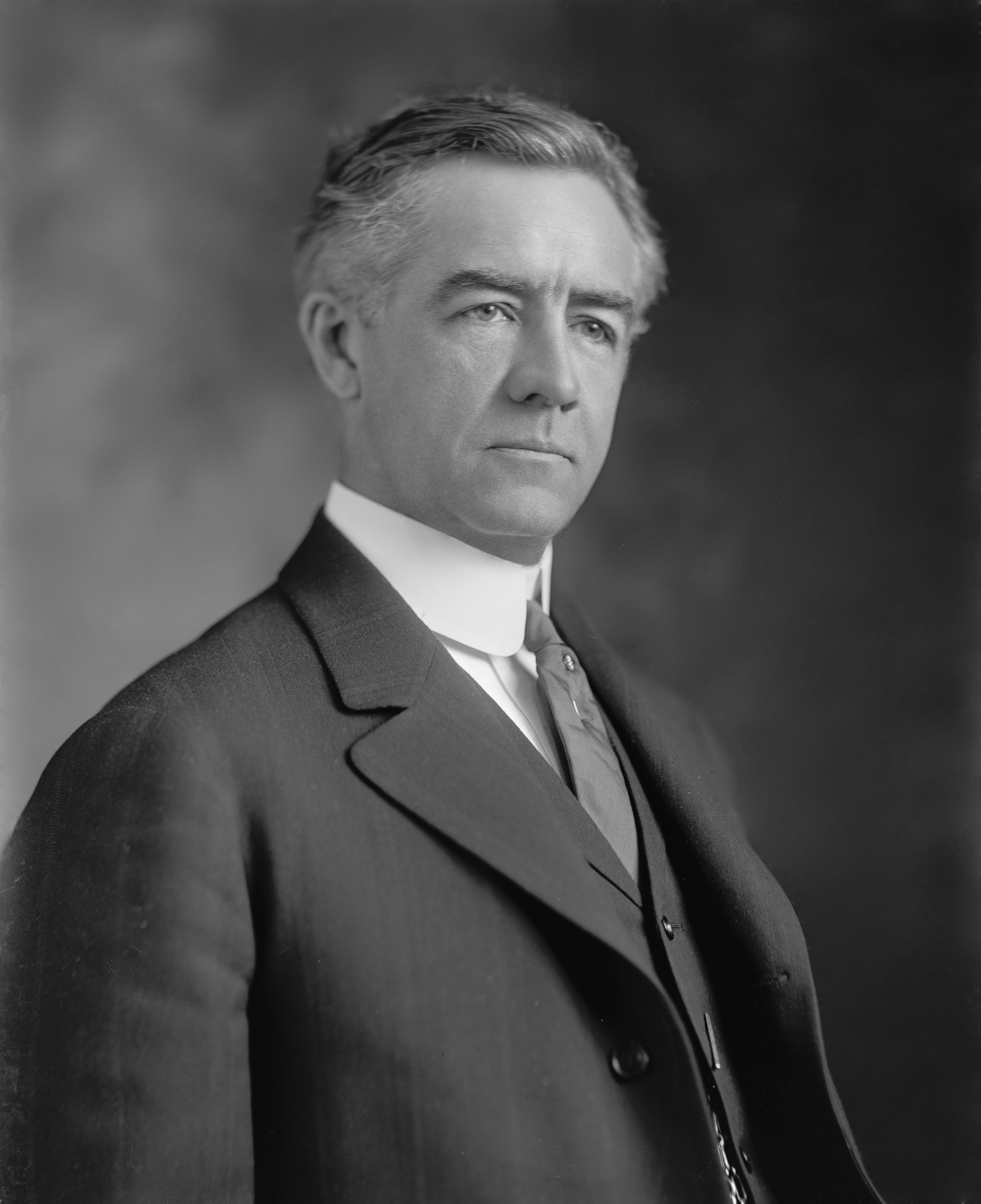
Nominee	Robert B. Howell	Gilbert Hitchcock
Party	Republican	Democratic
Popular vote	220,350	148,265
Percentage	56.84%	38.24%
- County results Howell: 40–50% 50–60% 60–70% 70–80% Hitchcock: 40–50% 50–60%
U.S. senator before election
Gilbert Hitchcock
Democratic
Elected U.S. Senator
Robert B. Howell
Republican

The 1922 United States Senate election in Nebraska took place on November 7, 1922. Incumbent Senator Gilbert M. Hitchcock ran for re-election to a third term. He was challenged in the general election by Republican Robert B. Howell, the Chairman of the Metropolitan Utilities District. Despite nationwide Democratic gains in the Senate, Hitchcock was defeated by Howell in a landslide.

== Republican primary ==
=== Candidates ===
- Robert B. Howell, Chair of the Metropolitan Utilities District
- Albert W. Jefferis, U.S. Representative from Nebraska's 2nd congressional district
- Clarence A. Davis, Attorney General of Nebraska
- C. H. Gustafson, President of the United States Grain Growers
- Frank John
- John O. Yeiser, former State Representative

=== Results ===
Republican primary results
Party	Candidate	Votes	%
Republican	Robert B. Howell	40,254	34.02%
Republican	Albert W. Jefferis	25,925	21.91%
Republican	Clarence A. Davis	25,534	21.58%
Republican	C. H. Gustafson	18,516	15.65%
Republican	Frank John	4,622	3.91%
Republican	John O. Yeiser	3,450	2.92%
Republican	Write-ins	27	0.02%
Total votes		118,428	100.00%

== Democratic primary ==
=== Candidates ===
- Gilbert M. Hitchcock, incumbent U.S. Senator
- J. O. Shreyer, former Director of the Nebraska Farmers' Union
- Anthony T. Monahan, member of the Nebraska Live Stock Commission

=== Results ===
Democratic primary results
Party	Candidate	Votes	%
Democratic	Gilbert M. Hitchcock (inc.)	46,752	63.18%
Democratic	J. O. Shreyer	17,045	23.03%
Democratic	Anthony T. Monahan	10,134	13.69%
Democratic	Write-ins	68	0.09%
Total votes		74,000	100.00%

== Progressive primary ==
=== Candidates ===
- Arthur G. Wray, former Mayor of York
- Anson H. Bigelow, union attorney

=== Results ===
Progressive primary results
Party	Candidate	Votes	%
Progressive Party (United States, 1924–1934)	Arthur G. Wray	5,823	72.25%
Progressive Party (United States, 1924–1934)	Anson H. Bigelow	2,215	27.48%
Progressive Party (United States, 1924–1934)	Scattering	21	0.26%
Total votes		8,059	100.00%

After winning the primary, Wray withdrew from the race and endorsed Howell, declaring, "It would be morally wrong for me, or any other man, to divide the progressive vote and contribute in the least degree to the re-election of the reactionary, Hitchcock."

== General election ==
1922 United States Senate election in Nebraska
Party	Candidate	Votes	%	±%
Republican	Robert B. Howell	220,350	56.84%	+10.95%
Democratic	Gilbert M. Hitchcock (inc.)	148,265	38.24%	−11.73%
Prohibition	James L. Beebe	19,076	4.92%	+3.37%
Write-in		2	0.00%	—
Majority		72,085	18.59%	+14.50%
Total votes		387,693	100.00%	
Republican gain from Democratic				
