= WOU (AM) =

Radio station in Omaha, Nebraska (1921–1923)

WOU was a short-lived radio station in Omaha, Nebraska, United States, originally licensed in December 1921 to Robert B. Howell, and later transferred to the city's Metropolitan Utilities District. It was the first formally recognized broadcasting station in the state of Nebraska, and was deleted in mid-1923.

== History ==
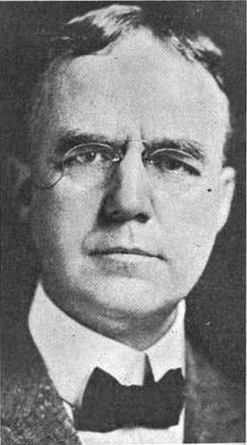
Future U.S. senator Robert B. Howell was WOU's original licensee.

WOU was first licensed to Robert B. Howell, general manager of Omaha, Nebraska's Metropolitan Utilities District. Howell's interest in radio broadcasting dated back to 1908, when, in the face of opposition from one of the city's newspapers to his plan for Omaha to purchase the local water works, he investigated the possibility of establishing a radio station to promote his proposal. Technical limitations made this broadcasting idea impossible at the time, however the later development of vacuum-tube radio transmitters would make the concept practical.

In March 1921 Howell suggested to postmaster general Will H. Hays that the U.S. government should establish its own official broadcasting stations. In early September 1921, Howell conferred with Hays prior to leaving for Europe to conduct a survey of radio broadcasting development. A contemporary wire report stated that Hayes expressed the hope that "in the near future radio phones could be utilized to broadcast weather and market reports and other information". Shortly thereafter the Commerce Department, which regulated radio at this time, issued a regulation formally creating a radio broadcasting service classification. Effective December 1, 1921, broadcasting stations could be established which held Limited Commercial licenses that authorized operation on two designated broadcasting wavelengths: 360 meters (833 kHz) for "entertainment", and 485 meters (619 kHz) for "market and weather reports".

On December 29, 1921, a license with the randomly assigned call letters WOU was issued to Robert B. Howell, for operation on both 360 and 485 meters. This was the first broadcasting station to be authorized to broadcast on the 485-meter "market and weather report" wavelength, and also the first broadcasting station in the state of Nebraska. In early 1922, station ownership was transferred to the Metropolitan Utilities District.

WOU apparently made few broadcasts, and was soon overshadowed by the establishment in 1922 of the Omaha Grain Exchange's broadcasting station, WAAW, and one of the U.S. Post Office's "Air Mail Radio" stations, KDEF, which broadcast daily live stock and grain reports. In early July, the Omaha World-Herald reported that WAAW was operating daily from 8:15 a.m. to 9:00 p.m., while WOU had "no schedule". WOU was subsequently deleted on June 23, 1923.

Howell briefly reentered the broadcasting field five years later. As part of his successful reelection run in 1928, he was issued a license for a low-powered portable broadcasting station, KGIF, (Note: KGIF was licensed in August 1928 and deleted the following May.) which was authorized for a few months to travel throughout Nebraska with the campaign.

== See also ==
- List of initial AM-band station grants in the United States
