= 1910 Nebraska gubernatorial election =

- November 8, 1910
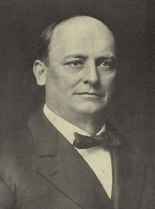

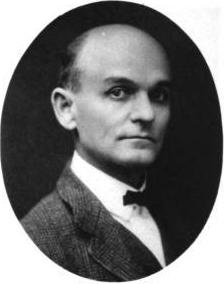
Nominee	Chester Hardy Aldrich	James Dahlman
Party	Republican	Democratic
Popular vote	123,070	107,760
Percentage	51.90%	45.45%
- County results Aldrich: 40–50% 50–60% 60–70% 70–80% Dahlman: 40–50% 50–60% 60–70%
Governor before election
Ashton C. Shallenberger
Democratic
Elected Governor
Chester Hardy Aldrich
Republican

The 1910 Nebraska gubernatorial election was held on November 8, 1910.

Incumbent Democratic Governor Ashton C. Shallenberger was defeated in the Democratic primary.

Republican nominee Chester Hardy Aldrich defeated Democratic nominee James Dahlman with 51.90% of the vote.

== Primary elections ==
Primary elections were held on August 16, 1910.

=== Democratic primary ===
==== Candidates ====
- James Dahlman, Mayor of Omaha
- Ashton C. Shallenberger, incumbent Governor

==== Results ====
Democratic primary results
Party	Candidate	Votes	%
Democratic	James Dahlman	27,591	50.28
Democratic	Ashton C. Shallenberger (incumbent)	27,287	49.72
Total votes		54,878	100.00

=== People's Independent primary ===
==== Candidates ====
- Ashton C. Shallenberger, incumbent Governor

==== Results ====
People's Independent primary results
Party	Candidate	Votes	%
Populist	Ashton C. Shallenberger (incumbent)	3,148	100.00
Total votes		3,148	100.00

Shellenberger declined the nomination. The state central committee decided not to fill the vacancy.

=== Prohibition primary ===
==== Candidates ====
- George I. Wright

==== Results ====
Prohibition primary results
Party	Candidate	Votes	%
Prohibition	George I. Wright	463	100.00
Total votes		463	100.00

Wright withdrew from the candidacy in favour of Aldrich.

=== Republican primary ===
==== Candidates ====
- Chester Hardy Aldrich, former State Senator
- Addison E. Cady, Republican candidate for Nebraska's 6th congressional district in 1896
- William Elmer Low, farmer

==== Results ====
Republican primary results
Party	Candidate	Votes	%
Republican	Chester Hardy Aldrich	20,627	51.43
Republican	Addison E. Cady	15,616	38.93
Republican	William Elmer Low	3,868	9.64
Total votes		40,111	100.00

=== Socialist primary ===
==== Candidates ====
- Clyde J. Wright, state secretary of the Socialist Party

==== Results ====
Socialist primary results
Party	Candidate	Votes	%
Socialist	Clyde J. Wright	841	100.00
Total votes		841	100.00

== General election ==
=== Candidates ===
Major party candidates

- James Dahlman, Democratic
- Chester Hardy Aldrich, Republican

Other candidates

- Clyde J. Wright, Socialist

=== Results ===
1910 Nebraska gubernatorial election
Party	Candidate	Votes	%
Republican	Chester Hardy Aldrich	123,070	51.90%
Democratic	James Dahlman	107,760	45.45%
Socialist	Clyde J. Wright	6,279	2.65%
Majority		15,310	6.45%
Turnout		237,109	
Republican gain from Democratic			

== See also ==
- 1910 Nebraska lieutenant gubernatorial election

== Bibliography ==
- Sheldon, Addison E., ed. (1915). The Nebraska Blue Book and Historical Register 1915. Lincoln: State Journal Company.
