= Alfred M. Post =

American judge (1847–1923)

Alfred M. Post (August 10, 1847 – August 26, 1923) was a justice of the Nebraska Supreme Court from 1892 to 1898, serving as chief justice from 1896 to 1898.

== Early life, education, and career ==
Born in Greenfield, Pennsylvania, Post was the son of a Presbyterian minister. At an early ago he moved with his parents to Cumberland, Ohio, where he attended the public schools. In 1869, he graduated from the law college of Ohio University, and gained admission to the bar in Bloomfield, Iowa. He taught school in Iowa for a time, and entered the private practive of law in Leon, Iowa, in 1870.

== Consular and judicial service ==
In 1874, Post was appointed to the United States consular service in Santiago, Cape Verde, where he spent two years. He moved to Columbus, Nebraska, in 1876, taking up the practice of law with the firm of Whitmoyer, Gerrard and Post. On March 7, 1883, Post was appointed Judge of the Fourth Judicial District of Nebraska, succeeding his brother, who had previously held that office. Post drove from one county seat to another in a horse and buggy to hear cases. He was re-elected in 1887, holding that office for a total of eight years, until he was elected to the state supreme court in the fall of 1891.

In 1898, Post left the court to accept an appointment from President William McKinley to serve as a district attorney in the Territory of Alaska. Post resigned after a year and returned to Columbus.

In 1911, he was appointed chairman of a commission to codify the laws of Nebraska, which took two years to complete. Edwin L. King and J.H. Broady joined him on the commission. The revised, codified statutes were published in 1913.

In 1919, Post was appointed to a vacant district judgeship, where he remained until his death.

== Personal life ==
Post married Ella Munsell in Hamilton, Iowa, on October 6, 1873, with whom he had nine children. Post died in Columbus at the age of 76.

Political offices
Preceded by Amasa Cobb	Justice of the Nebraska Supreme Court; 1892–1898	Succeeded by John Joseph Sullivan
