= Osceola, Nebraska =

- City
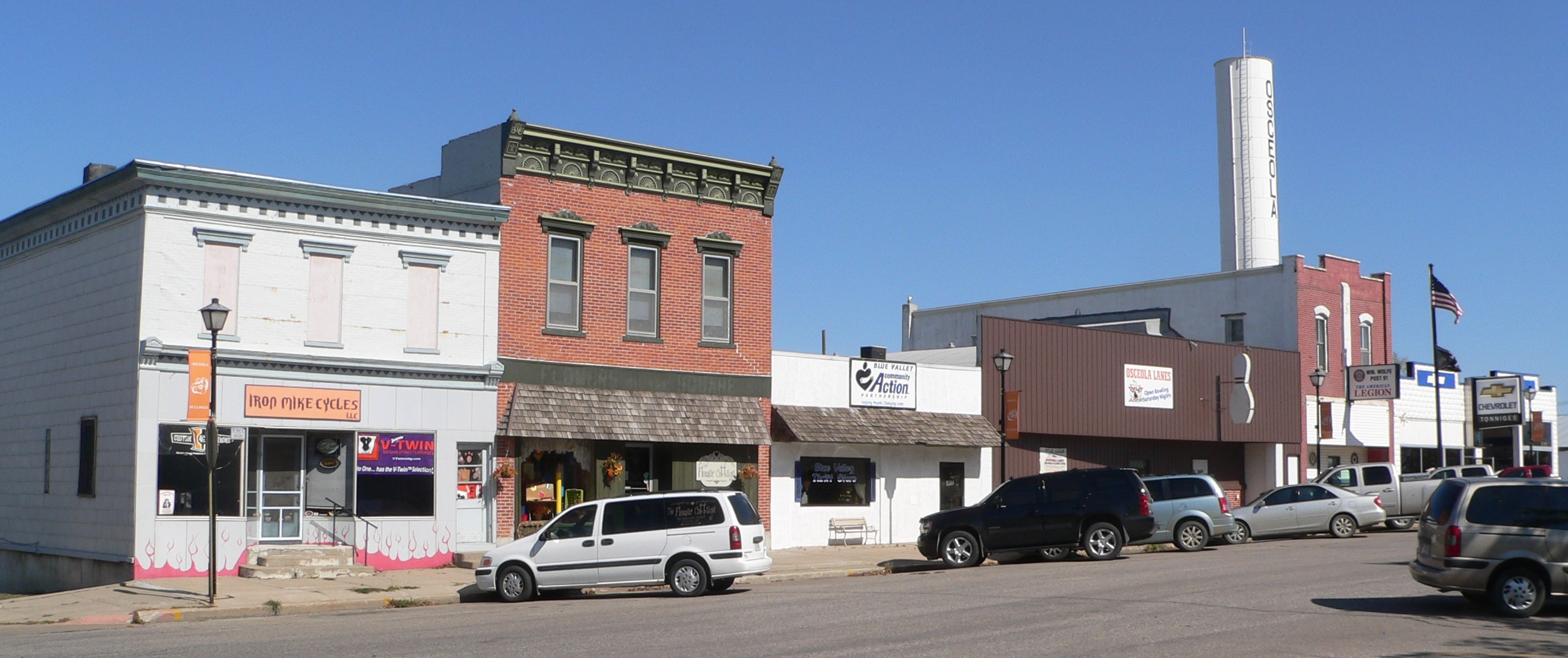
- Downtown Osceola: north side of courthouse square

- Location of Osceola, Nebraska
- Coordinates: 41°10′41″N 97°32′59″W
- Country: United States
- State: Nebraska
- County: Polk

Area
  - Total: 0.92 sq mi (2.39 km^{2})
  - Land: 0.92 sq mi (2.39 km^{2})
  - Water: 0 sq mi (0.00 km^{2})
- Elevation: 1,647 ft (502 m)

Population (2020)
  - Total: 875
  - Density: 949.0/sq mi (366.43/km^{2})
- Time zone: UTC−6 (Central (CST))
  - Summer (DST): UTC−5 (CDT)
- ZIP code: 68651
- Area code: 402
- FIPS code: 31-37525
- GNIS feature ID: 2396093

Osceola is a city in and the county seat of Polk County, Nebraska, United States. As of the 2020 census, Osceola had a population of 875.

== History ==
According to the University of Nebraska–Lincoln, the first settlers of Osceola, which included the families of Reverend James Query and Vinson Perry Davis, arrived in October 1868. Davis is credited with naming the settlement after a city of the same name in Iowa, which had been named after Chief Osceola of the Seminole people. After three years of settlement and disputes over the permanent location, the town itself was organized by frontiersmen William Francis Kimmel and John Hopwood Mickey in the early fall of 1871. It had been decided in an election by a margin of 14 votes, prior to the formation that the "geographic center of the county" was best suited to be the settlement's site. A courthouse was erected the following spring and a general store was founded in May. During the summer, a post office was built, which served as a terminus between the cities of Lincoln and Ulysses. The town's first full year concluded with the establishment of a public school. The following year brought Methodism to the town, and a church for the faith had been completed by 1878. In the succeeding year, Nebraska Wesleyan college was founded in the church, serving 11 students by means of 4 instructors. The school would later move to Fullerton. The Omaha and Republican Valley Railroad, reached the town in 1879 and named a locomotive after the city, however it was ultimately renamed the number "9." Two years following the arrival of the railroad, the settlement was incorporated as a village on August 26, 1881 after accumulating a population of 200 citizens. The city would ultimately reach its peak of 1,200 residents in 1920.

A newspaper titled The Homesteader was established in August 1873. It was renamed the Osceola Record in March 1876, and as of 1995 it is known as the Polk County News. It currently has a circulation of approximately 1,850 subscribers.

The city experienced a drought from 1893–95. During the final stages in 1895, much of the city was burned by a two-hour-long fire that left only two buildings standing.

A sewage plant for the city was constructed in 1958 and expanded in 2007. Hanna Keelan from Lincoln, Nebraska was responsible for the formation of a comprehensive city plan formulated in 1985.

In the city's centennial year of 1971, celebrations were held for the city and twenty years after this, festivities marked the 100th anniversary of St. Mary's Catholic Church just outside town.

== Geography ==
According to the United States Census Bureau, the city has a total area of 0.92 square miles (2.38 km^{2}), all land.

Using paved roads, Stromsburg and Shelby are tied as the closest cities to Osceola, located approximately 6.8 miles (10.9 km) away. Polk, which is in the same county as Osceola is located 19 miles (31 km) away. Outside of the county, Silver Creek is the closest city, found 11 miles (18 km) away.

With regard to the largest cities of the state, Osceola is found 49 miles (79 km) northeast of Grand Island, 76 miles (122 km) northwest of Lincoln and 90 miles (140 km) to the west of Omaha.

Surrounding places

=== Climate ===
Osceola has a humid continental climate (Köppen Dfa), with cold, dry winters and warm, humid summers. Precipitation is highest in the late spring and summer months, with an annual average of 28.79 in (731 mm). The city's highest recorded temperature was 112 °F or 44.4 °C in 1954 and the lowest −31 °F or −35.0 °C in 2021.

Climate data for Osceola, Nebraska (1991–2020 normals, extremes 1907–present)
Month	Jan	Feb	Mar	Apr	May	Jun	Jul	Aug	Sep	Oct	Nov	Dec	Year
Record high °F (°C)	73 (23)	81 (27)	90 (32)	98 (37)	104 (40)	110 (43)	116 (47)	112 (44)	105 (41)	93 (34)	83 (28)	72 (22)	116 (47)
Mean maximum °F (°C)	56.7 (13.7)	62.5 (16.9)	75.4 (24.1)	84.5 (29.2)	90.6 (32.6)	93.9 (34.4)	95.0 (35.0)	93.3 (34.1)	91.2 (32.9)	84.7 (29.3)	72.2 (22.3)	58.4 (14.7)	96.8 (36.0)
Mean daily maximum °F (°C)	34.3 (1.3)	39.0 (3.9)	51.6 (10.9)	62.7 (17.1)	73.0 (22.8)	82.4 (28.0)	86.0 (30.0)	83.8 (28.8)	78.0 (25.6)	65.1 (18.4)	50.3 (10.2)	37.4 (3.0)	62.0 (16.7)
Daily mean °F (°C)	23.7 (−4.6)	27.7 (−2.4)	38.9 (3.8)	49.8 (9.9)	61.5 (16.4)	71.5 (21.9)	75.4 (24.1)	73.0 (22.8)	65.6 (18.7)	52.5 (11.4)	38.5 (3.6)	27.3 (−2.6)	50.4 (10.2)
Mean daily minimum °F (°C)	13.1 (−10.5)	16.4 (−8.7)	26.2 (−3.2)	37.0 (2.8)	50.1 (10.1)	60.7 (15.9)	64.8 (18.2)	62.2 (16.8)	53.1 (11.7)	39.8 (4.3)	26.7 (−2.9)	17.1 (−8.3)	38.9 (3.8)
Mean minimum °F (°C)	−8.9 (−22.7)	−3.5 (−19.7)	6.8 (−14.0)	21.8 (−5.7)	35.1 (1.7)	48.1 (8.9)	53.8 (12.1)	51.9 (11.1)	38.5 (3.6)	22.7 (−5.2)	8.9 (−12.8)	−2.5 (−19.2)	−12.4 (−24.7)
Record low °F (°C)	−30 (−34)	−31 (−35)	−20 (−29)	0 (−18)	21 (−6)	37 (3)	38 (3)	38 (3)	22 (−6)	5 (−15)	−13 (−25)	−29 (−34)	−31 (−35)
Average precipitation inches (mm)	0.66 (17)	0.78 (20)	1.62 (41)	2.90 (74)	4.86 (123)	4.20 (107)	3.15 (80)	3.58 (91)	2.42 (61)	2.17 (55)	1.36 (35)	1.09 (28)	28.79 (731)
Average snowfall inches (cm)	6.2 (16)	7.5 (19)	4.1 (10)	2.0 (5.1)	0.0 (0.0)	0.0 (0.0)	0.0 (0.0)	0.0 (0.0)	0.0 (0.0)	0.9 (2.3)	2.8 (7.1)	5.8 (15)	29.3 (74)
Average precipitation days (≥ 0.01 in)	4.4	4.9	6.9	8.8	11.6	10.1	8.8	8.7	7.0	6.5	4.8	4.9	87.4
Average snowy days (≥ 0.1 in)	3.7	4.1	2.2	0.8	0.1	0.0	0.0	0.0	0.0	0.4	1.8	3.4	16.5
Source: NOAA

== Demographics ==
Historical population
Census	Pop.	Note	%±
1880	527		—
1890	947		79.7%
1900	882		−6.9%
1910	1,105		25.3%
1920	1,209		9.4%
1930	1,054		−12.8%
1940	1,039		−1.4%
1950	1,098		5.7%
1960	1,013		−7.7%
1970	923		−8.9%
1980	975		5.6%
1990	879		−9.8%
2000	921		4.8%
2010	880		−4.5%
2020	875		−0.6%
U.S. Decennial Census

=== 2010 census ===
As of the census of 2010, there were 880 people, 365 households, and 229 families residing in the city. The population density was 956.5 inhabitants per square mile (369.3/km^{2}). There were 415 housing units at an average density of 451.1 per square mile (174.2/km^{2}). The racial makeup of the city was 98.6% White, 0.2% Native American, 0.1% Asian, 0.2% Pacific Islander, and 0.8% from two or more races. Hispanic or Latino of any race were 0.6% of the population.

There were 365 households, of which 31.2% had children under the age of 18 living with them, 49.9% were married couples living together, 11.0% had a female householder with no husband present, 1.9% had a male householder with no wife present, and 37.3% were non-families. 33.7% of all households were made up of individuals, and 19.5% had someone living alone who was 65 years of age or older. The average household size was 2.29 and the average family size was 2.94.

The median age in the city was 45.3 years. 25% of residents were under the age of 18; 5.2% were between the ages of 18 and 24; 19.1% were from 25 to 44; 29.5% were from 45 to 64; and 21% were 65 years of age or older. The gender makeup of the city was 45.8% male and 54.2% female.

=== 2000 census ===
As of the census of 2000, there were 921 people, 381 households, and 235 families residing in the city. The population density was 1,036.8 inhabitants per square mile (400.3/km^{2}). There were 417 housing units at an average density of 469.4 per square mile (181.2/km^{2}). The racial makeup of the city was 99.57% White, 0.33% Native American, and 0.11% from two or more races. Hispanic or Latino of any race were 0.43% of the population.

There were 381 households, out of which 27.3% had children under the age of 18 living with them, 54.9% were married couples living together, 5.8% had a female householder with no husband present, and 38.1% were non-families. 36.7% of all households were made up of individuals, and 23.6% had someone living alone who was 65 years of age or older. The average household size was 2.27 and the average family size was 2.99.

The median age in the city was 43 years. 23.8% of the population was under the age of 18, 5.4% were aged from 18 to 24, 23.6%, from 25 to 44, 20.8%, from 45 to 64, and 26.4% were 65 years of age or older. For every 100 females, there were 80.2 males. For every 100 females age 18 and over, there were 78.2 males.

As of 2000 the median income for a household in the city was $34,737, and the median income for a family was $46,354. Males had a median income of $33,906 versus $19,432 for females. The per capita income for the city was $17,037. About 5.2% of families and 6.8% of the population were below the poverty line, including 10.7% of those under age 18 and 3.2% of those age 65 or over.

== Economy ==
The economy of Osceola is based upon agriculture. Like most of Polk County, Osceola is involved in dairy, cattle and pork production. Seed corn and soybean are among the grains produced by the city.

Osceola's largest employer is the "Annie Jeffrey Memorial County Health Center", which employs 56 individuals overall, 52 of which are female. The largest local employer of males is the Polk County government with 25 male employees.

Roughly $2.33 of tax were paid in the city for every $100.00. The tax rate has steadily decreased from 2005 to 2007. A 1% sales tax is imposed upon the citizens by the city government.

== Government ==
The city government includes a mayor and a city council. City planning is conducted by a five-member commission appointed by the mayor and approved by the city council. They serve for three year terms.

City services include, one fire station located within the city, provided with twenty-five volunteers and twelve Emergency Medical Technicians. The Polk County Sheriff's Department is also found in the city limits and includes seven sworn officers, four part-time officers and five support personnel.

The city of Osceola banned the ownership of certain dog breeds including Staffordshire Bull Terriers, American Pit Bull Terriers, American Staffordshire Terriers, Chow Chows, Dobermans, Rottweilers, American Bandog Mastiffs and Neapolitan Mastiffs within city limits during the summer of 2008. Citizens were given 48 hours to transfer the dogs from their residence.

== Education ==
Osceola Public Schools operates two schools: Jeffrey Elementary and the Osceola Middle/High School.

== Notable people ==
- John Archer, actor
- Stanley K. Hathaway, governor of Wyoming and U.S. secretary of the interior
- Edwin L. King, codifier of the Nebraska Revised Statutes in 1913
- John H. Mickey, governor of Nebraska
- Albinus Nance, governor of Nebraska
- Ashton C. Shallenberger, governor of Nebraska

== See also ==
- List of municipalities in Nebraska
