= Richard Lee Metcalfe =

American politician (1861–1954)

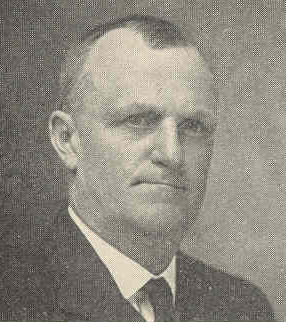

Military Governor of Panama Canal Zone
- In office 1913–1914
- Appointed by: William Howard Taft
- Preceded by: Maurice Hudson Thatcher
- Succeeded by: George Washington Goethals as 1st civil governor

Personal details
- Born: November 11, 1861 Upper Alton, Illinois, U.S.
- Died: March 31, 1954 (aged 92) Omaha, Nebraska, U.S.
- Children: Theodore W. Metcalfe

Richard Lee Metcalfe (October 11, 1861 – March 31, 1954) was an American politician and editor who was the last military governor of Panama Canal Zone and one-time mayor of Omaha, Nebraska.

== Biography ==
Metcalfe was born on October 11, 1861, to Richard Lee Metcalfe and Ellen Tazewell Edwards. He began his career as an editor at the Omaha World-Herald, where he also authored a biography of William Jennings Bryan.

Metcalfe ran for the Democratic nomination for Governor of Nebraska in the 1912 election but lost to John H. Morehead.

He died on March 31, 1954, in Omaha, Nebraska.

== Works ==
- Life and patriotic services of Hon. William J. Bryan (1896)

Party political offices
| Preceded by Gilbert Hitchcock | Democratic nominee for U.S. Senator from Nebraska (Class 1); 1928 | Succeeded by Richard C. Hunter |
| Preceded by Maurice Hudson Thatcher | Military Governor of Panama Canal Zone; 1913–1914 | Succeeded by Civil Governor George Washington Goethals |
