= John H. Mickey =

American politician (1845–1910)

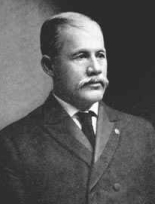

13th Governor of Nebraska
- In office January 8, 1903 – January 3, 1907
- Lieutenant: Edmund G. McGilton
- Preceded by: Ezra P. Savage
- Succeeded by: George L. Sheldon

Member of the Nebraska House of Representatives from the 35th district
- In office January 4, 1881 – February 26, 1881

Personal details
- Born: September 30, 1845 Burlington, Iowa, U.S.
- Died: June 2, 1910 (aged 64) Osceola, Nebraska, U.S.
- Party: Republican
- Spouse(s): Morinda McCray; Flora Cinderella Campbell
- Parent(s): Oliver Perry Mickey; Betsy Ann Davidson
- Education: Iowa Wesleyan College
- Occupation: Banker, Politician

John Hopwood Mickey (September 30, 1845 – June 2, 1910) was an American banker and Republican politician who served as the 13th governor of Nebraska from 1903 to 1907.

== Life and career ==
=== Early life and ancestors ===
He was born near Burlington, Iowa, on September 30, 1845, a son of Oliver Perry Mickey, a pioneer in Iowa, locating there from Pennsylvania in 1836 and Betsy Ann Davidson.

=== Education ===
In 1847, his parents moved the family removed to Louisa County, Iowa, and it was there his education was attained in the Iowa public school system. After being mustered out of the service, he returned to his Iowa home and for two years was a student at Iowa Wesleyan College in Mount Pleasant, Iowa. Upon leaving college, he engaged in school teaching and during the vacation periods he devoted himself to farming.

=== Military service ===
In 1863, he enlisted as a private in the Union Army, in Company D, 8th Iowa cavalry, and served until the close of the war. His regiment was in service in eastern Tennessee and with William Tecumseh Sherman in his Atlanta campaign until the successful surrender of Atlanta on September 2, 1864. He also served in the Franklin-Nashville Campaign. He was honorably mustered out of service in August 1865.

=== Marriage and family ===
He married as his first wife, on September 10, 1867, at Des Moines, Iowa, Morinda McCray, born April 8, 1849, at Fayette, Indiana, the daughter of James McCray and Mary Harlan. She died on December 23, 1886, at Osceola, Polk County, Nebraska and is buried in Osceola Cemetery. John and Morinda were the parents of 5 children.

He married, as his second wife, on December 8, 1887, at the Methodist Episcopal Church in Osceola, Polk County, Nebraska, Flora Cinderella Campbell, the daughter of Benjamin Crawford Campbell and Elizabeth Ann Scott. She was born on November 16, 1861, in Iowa and died on January 16, 1938, at Osceola, Nebraska. She is buried next to her husband in Osceola Cemetery. John and Flora were the parents of 4 children.

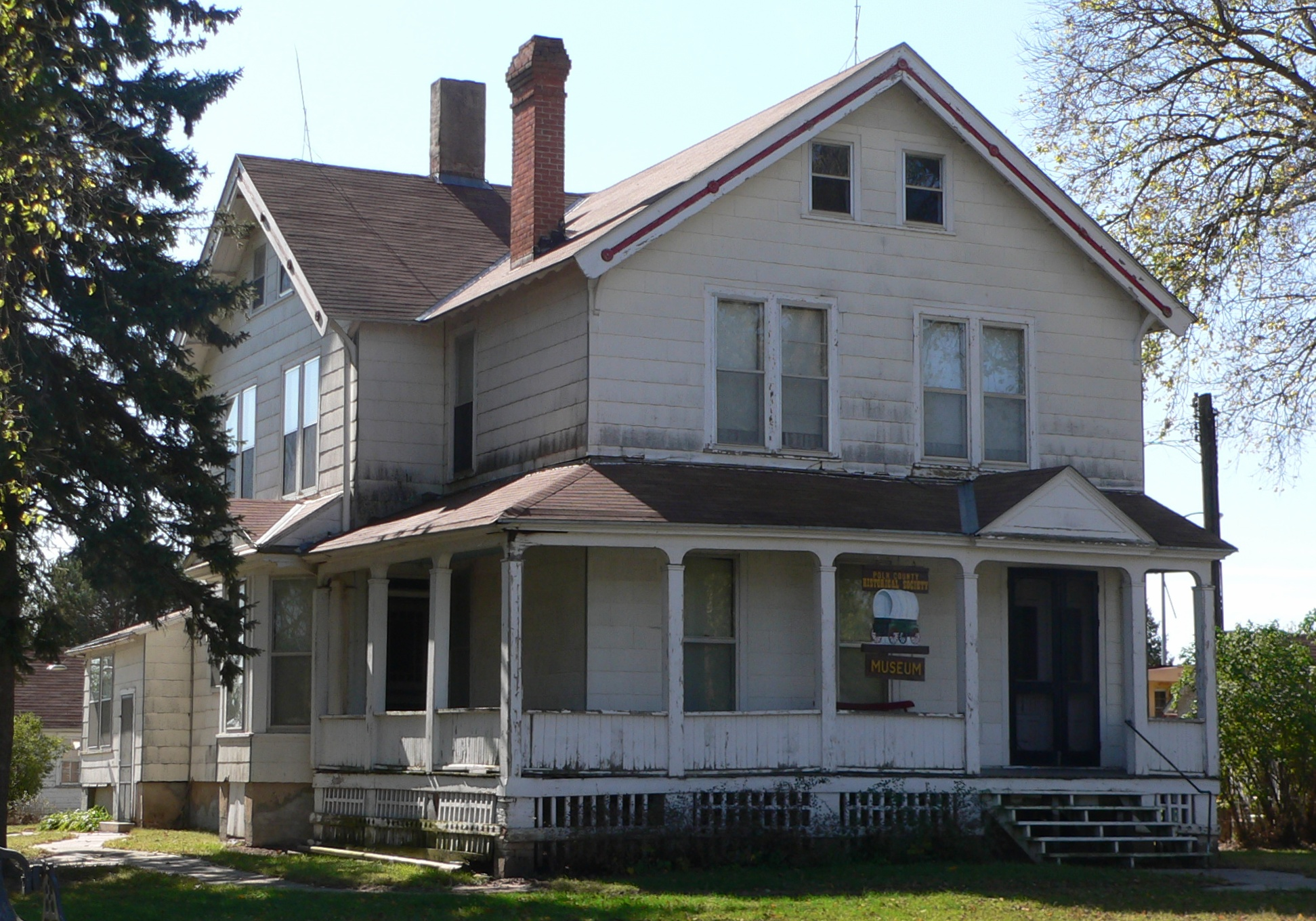
Mickey's house in Osceola is listed in the National Register of Historic Places. It is now part of the Polk County Historical Society Museum.

=== Career ===
He moved with his young bride and child to Polk County, Nebraska, arrived on September 3, 1868, and homesteaded. He moved to the town of Osceola in 1872.

In May 1879, the Osceola Bank, with a capital stock of $5,000 was opened by Mr. Mickey. During the financial stringency of 1893, when financial institutions throughout the country were threatened with disaster, Mr. Mickey's bank survived the storm and was the means of assisting many of the business houses and farmers of Polk county in maintaining such credit as enabled them to survive during the depressed times.

=== Political career ===
Even though his father was a Stephen A. Douglas Democrat, he always identified as a Republican. He cast his first vote for Abraham Lincoln in 1864, when he was only nineteen years old, the State of Iowa having passed a special act enabling all soldiers to vote irrespective of age.

Shortly after settling in Nebraska, Mickey was elected treasurer of Polk County. After 10 years as treasurer, he served two terms in the Nebraska House of Representatives. He was elected governor of Nebraska in 1902 and re-elected in 1904. His failed attempt to arbitrate strikes in Omaha between Gurdon Wattles's Omaha Traction Company and union organizers in 1903 marked the rest of his administration.

During his tenure as governor, numerous pardons were granted; an improved state auditing system was initiated; and a direct primary law was promoted.

=== Post career ===
After retiring as governor, John Mickey returned to Osceola, Nebraska. He was an active member of the Osceola Methodist Episcopal Church, and for many years was a trustee of his church and superintendent of the Sunday school. He was a lifelong supporter of the temperance movement, and served as president of the Board of Trustees of Nebraska Wesleyan University.

=== Death ===
He died at his home in Osceola on June 2, 1910.

Party political offices
Preceded by Charles Henry Dietrich	Republican nominee for Governor of Nebraska; 1902, 1904	Succeeded by George L. Sheldon
Political offices
Preceded by Ezra P. Savage	Governor of Nebraska; 1903–1907	Succeeded by George L. Sheldon
