= 1904 Nebraska gubernatorial election =

- November 8, 1904
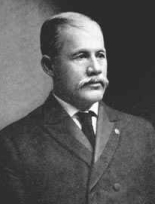

Nominee	John H. Mickey	George W. Berge
Party	Republican	Populist
Alliance		Democratic
Popular vote	111,711	102,568
Percentage	49.67%	45.61%
- County results Mickey: 40–50% 50–60% 60–70% 70–80% Berge: 40–50% 50–60% 60–70% Tie: 40–50%
Governor before election
John H. Mickey
Republican
Elected Governor
John H. Mickey
Republican

The 1904 Nebraska gubernatorial election was held on November 8, 1904. Incumbent Republican Governor John H. Mickey won re-election to a second term, defeating Democratic and Populist fusion nominee George W. Berge with 49.67% of the vote.

== General election ==
=== Candidates ===
Major party candidates

- George W. Berge, Populist, Democratic fusion candidate, attorney, Fusion candidate for Nebraska's 1st congressional district in 1900
- John H. Mickey, Republican, incumbent Governor

Other candidates

- Rev. Clarence F. Swander, Prohibition
- Benjamin H. Vail, Socialist

=== Results ===
1904 Nebraska gubernatorial election
Party	Candidate	Votes	%
Republican	John H. Mickey (incumbent)	111,711	49.67%
Populist	George W. Berge	102,568	45.61%
Prohibition	Clarence F. Swander	5,488	2.44%
Socialist	Benjamin H. Vail	5,122	2.28%
Scattering		6	0.00%
Majority		9,143	4.06%
Turnout		224,895	
Republican hold			

== See also ==
- 1904 Nebraska lieutenant gubernatorial election
