= John H. Morehead =

American politician (1861–1942)

John Henry Morehead
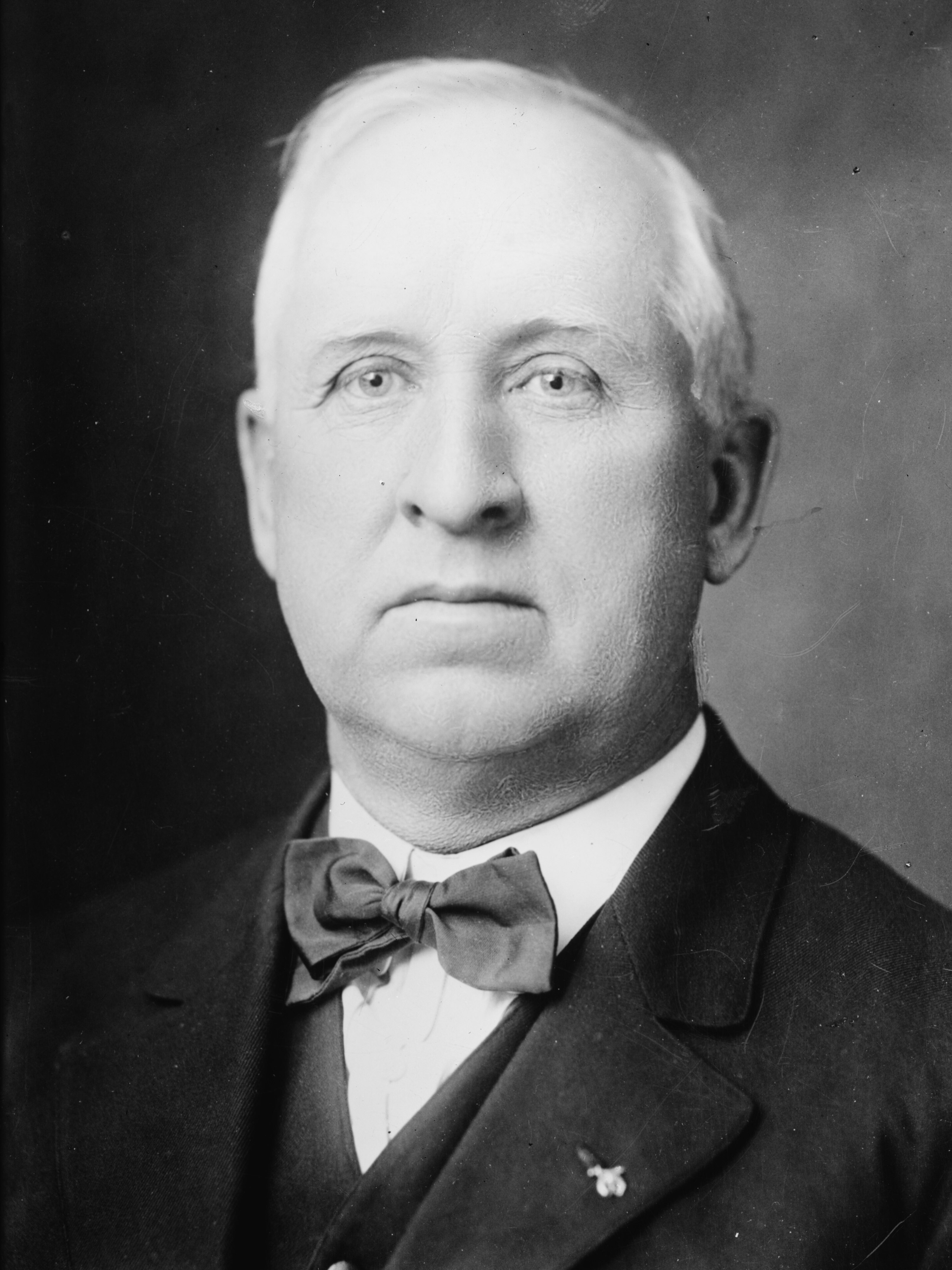

Member of the U.S. House of Representatives from Nebraska's 1st district
- In office March 4, 1923 – January 3, 1935
- Preceded by: Roy H. Thorpe
- Succeeded by: Henry C. Luckey

17th Governor of Nebraska
- In office January 9, 1913 – January 4, 1917
- Lieutenant: Samuel R. McKelvie (1913–15); James Pearson (1915–17)
- Preceded by: Chester H. Aldrich
- Succeeded by: Keith Neville

Acting Lieutenant Governor of Nebraska
- In office May 2, 1911 – January 9, 1913
- Governor: Chester H. Aldrich
- Preceded by: Melville R. Hopewell
- Succeeded by: Samuel R. McKelvie

26th President pro tempore of the Nebraska Senate
- In office January 1911 – January 1913
- Preceded by: George W. Tibbets
- Succeeded by: James H. Kemp

Member of the Nebraska State Senate
- In office 1910–1912

Personal details
- Born: December 3, 1861 Columbia, Iowa, U.S.
- Died: May 31, 1942 (aged 80) St. Joseph, Missouri, U.S.
- Party: Democratic
- Spouse: Minnie Weisenreder
- Children: 2

John Henry Morehead (December 3, 1861 – May 31, 1942) was an American politician who served as the 17th governor of Nebraska from 1913 to 1917.

== Early life ==
Born on a farm in Lucas County, Iowa, Morehead attended business college and moved to Richardson County, Nebraska, in 1884.

== Career ==
After arriving in Nebraska, Morehead taught school, farmed, and banked, and eventually opened his own mercantile business.

Morehead moved to Falls City, Nebraska, where he and served as the first treasurer of Richardson County from 1896 to 1899. He was later the mayor of the city in 1900. He was elected to the Nebraska state senate in 1910 and served as its president pro tempore.

On May 2, 1911, the Lieutenant Governor of Nebraska, Melville R. Hopewell, died while in office. Although Morehead is not listed in recent editions of the Nebraska Blue Book as having served as Lieutenant Governor, multiple sources from the time indicate that after the death of Hopewell, Morehead was considered the Acting Lieutenant Governor due to his position as president pro tempore of the Nebraska Senate based on a misinterpretation of Article V, Section 18, of the Nebraska Constitution. (Article V, Section 18, of the Nebraska constitution at the time provided that "If there be no lieutenant governor..., the president [pro tempore] of the senate shall act as governor until the vacancy is filled, or the disability removed...." This would only take effect if the office of Governor of Nebraska was vacant and there was no Lieutenant Governor then in office to fill it. It should not have been applied to the case where only the office of lieutenant governor was vacant.) Thus, in the 1915 Nebraska Blue Book and the 1918 Nebraska Blue Book, Morehead is listed as having served as Lieutenant Governor. It is also said in a local newspaper account from the time that Morehead "became acting Lieutenant Governor of the state" and other newspaper accounts from the time referred to him as the "lieutenant governor" or "acting lieutenant governor." However, as soon as 1920, he was not being included in the list of lieutenant governors of Nebraska in the Nebraska Blue Book though editions of the Blue Book during the time that Morehead served as a U.S. representative stated that he had been the lieutenant governor in his biography while still failing to list him with the other lieutenant governors. In addition, some later editions of the Blue Book noted that Morehead was the President pro tempore during the time that the lieutenant governor's office was vacant.

In 1912, Morehead was elected Governor of Nebraska and served from 1913 to 1917. During his term, he was a delegate to the Democratic National Convention. As governor the state deficit was reduced, a workman's compensation law was sanctioned, and other labor reforms were carried out.

Morehead was the Democratic nominee in the 1918 United States Senate election in Nebraska and 1920 Nebraska gubernatorial election, losing both races.

Morehead was elected to the 68th Congress (1923) and reelected five more times. He chaired the Committee on Memorials in the 72nd and 73rd Congresses. He did not stand for re-election in 1934 and returned to farming and selling real estate. He was again a delegate to the Democratic National Convention in 1940.

== Personal life ==
Morehead married Minnie Weisenreder on February 14, 1885, and they had two children. He died in St. Joseph, Missouri, in 1942. He is interred in Steele Cemetery, Falls City, Richardson County, Nebraska.

Party political offices
Preceded by James Dahlman	Democratic nominee for Governor of Nebraska; 1912, 1914	Succeeded by Keith Neville
Preceded by Ashton C. Shallenberger	Democratic nominee for U.S. Senator from Nebraska (Class 2); 1918	Succeeded by J. J. Thomas
Preceded by Keith Neville	Democratic nominee for Governor of Nebraska; 1920	Succeeded by Charles W. Bryan
Political offices
Preceded by Chester H. Aldrich	Governor of Nebraska; 1913–1917	Succeeded by Keith Neville
U.S. House of Representatives
Preceded by Roy H. Thorpe (R)	Member of the U.S. House of Representatives from Nebraska's 1st congressional district March 4, 1923 – January 3, 1935	Succeeded by Henry Carl Luckey (D)
