= Melville R. Hopewell =

American politician

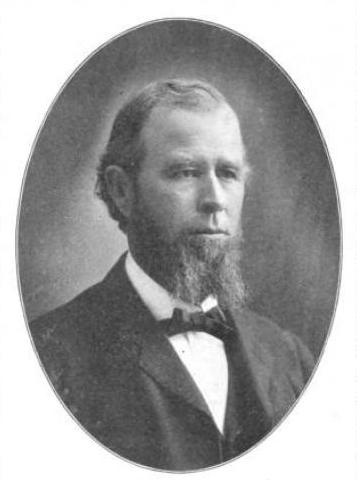

12th Lieutenant Governor of Nebraska
- In office January 3, 1907 – May 2, 1911
- Governor: George L. Sheldon; Ashton C. Shallenberger; Chester Hardy Aldrich
- Preceded by: Edmund G. McGilton
- Succeeded by: John H. Morehead (acting); Samuel Roy McKelvie

Personal details
- Born: March 27, 1845 Monroe County, Indiana
- Died: May 2, 1911 (aged 66) Nebraska
- Spouse: Hattie E. Nelson

Melville Reeves Hopewell (March 27, 1845 – May 2, 1911) was a Nebraska lawyer and Republican politician who served as the state's 12th lieutenant governor from 1907 to 1911.

Hopewell was born in Monroe County, Indiana, in 1845, and moved to Collin County, Texas, with his parents in 1851. After his mother died in 1854, the family returned to Indiana, where his father remarried, and then moved to Kansas, followed by Gentry County, Missouri. Hopewell served in the Missouri Mounted Militia from 1863 to 1864. He graduated from Indiana Asbury University in 1869, was admitted to the bar in Indiana, then moved to Tekamah, Nebraska, in 1870. He founded the first bank in Burt County, Nebraska, in 1873. In 1887, Nebraska Governor Thayer appointed Hopewell as a district judge, which he served as until 1896, at which point he resumed his practice of law.

In 1906, Hopewell was elected as lieutenant governor. He served from January 1907 until he died in office on May 2, 1911.

Political offices
Preceded by Edmund G. McGilton	Lieutenant Governor of Nebraska; 1907-May 2, 1911	Succeeded by Samuel Roy McKelvie
