= 1940 Nebraska gubernatorial election =

- November 5, 1940
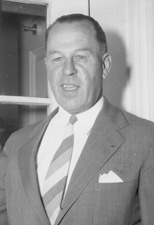

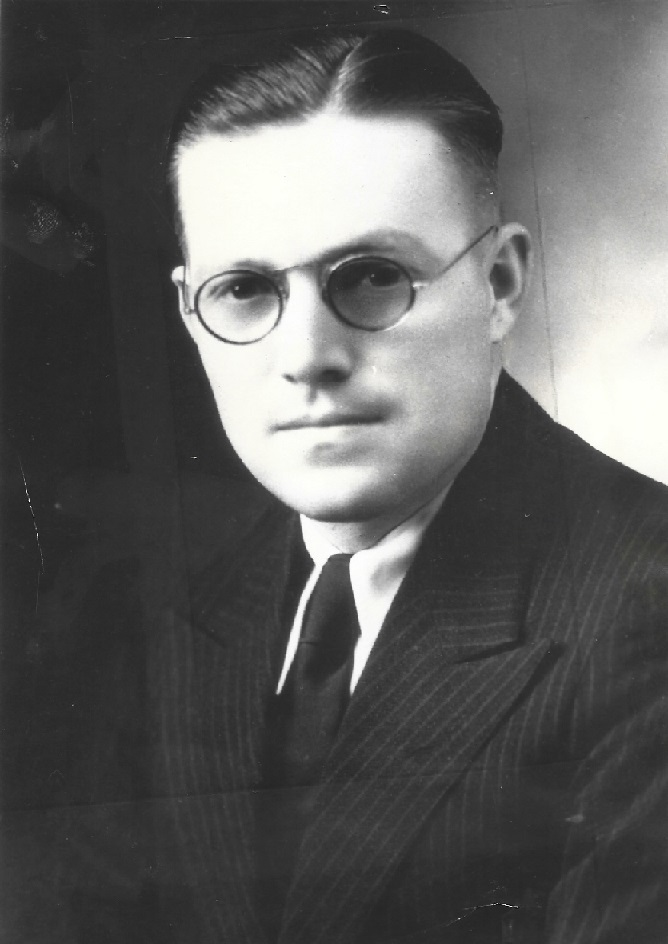
| Nominee | Dwight Griswold | Terry Carpenter |
| Party | Republican | Democratic |
| Popular vote | 365,638 | 235,167 |
| Percentage | 60.86% | 39.14% |
- County results Griswold: 50–60% 60–70% 70–80% Carpenter: 50–60%
Governor before election
Robert L. Cochran
Democratic
Elected Governor
Dwight Griswold
Republican

The 1940 Nebraska gubernatorial election was held on Tuesday November 5, to elect next the Governor of Nebraska. Republican candidate and featured newspaper publisher and former state representative Dwight Griswold defeating Democratic candidate and former United States Representative for Nebraska's 5th congressional district Terry Carpenter. Griswold became the first Republican to win the governorship since 1928.

== Democratic primary ==
=== Candidates ===
- Fred W. Bartzatt
- Terry Carpenter, former U.S. Representative
- Dr. John A. Guttery, a dentist from Lynch, Nebraska, who previously ran for the Democratic nomination for lieutenant governor in 1934
- Keith Neville, former Governor of Nebraska from 1917 to 1919

=== Results ===
Democratic primary results
| Party | Candidate | Votes | % |
|---|---|---|---|
| Democratic | Terry Carpenter | 68,017 | 47.53 |
| Democratic | Keith Neville | 67,013 | 46.82 |
| Democratic | John A. Guttery | 4,502 | 3.15 |
| Democratic | Fred W. Bartzatt | 3,584 | 2.50 |

== Republican primary ==
=== Candidates ===
- C. E. Alter, state director of the National Reclamation Association
- Ed M. Baumann, Mayor of West Point
- Dwight Griswold, newspaper publisher, former member of the Nebraska Legislature, and unsuccessful Republican nominee for governor in 1932, 1934, and 1936.
- Arthur L. Miller, member of the Nebraska Legislature and physician
- Robert G. Ross
- Charles J. Warner, former Speaker of the Nebraska Legislature

=== Results ===
Republican primary results
| Party | Candidate | Votes | % |
|---|---|---|---|
| Republican | Dwight Griswold | 73,330 | 42.52 |
| Republican | Charles J. Warner | 55,386 | 32.12 |
| Republican | Arthur L. Miller | 22,408 | 12.99 |
| Republican | Ed M. Baumann | 10,693 | 6.20 |
| Republican | C. E. Alter | 7,570 | 4.39 |
| Republican | Robert G. Ross | 3,075 | 1.78 |

== General election ==
=== Results ===
Nebraska gubernatorial election, 1940
| Party | Candidate | Votes | % |
|---|---|---|---|
| Republican | Dwight Griswold | 365,638 | 60.86% |
| Democratic | Terry Carpenter | 235,167 | 39.14% |
| Total votes | | 600,805 | 100.00% |
| Republican gain from Democratic | | | |

==== By County ====
By county

| County | Person Democratic | | Person Republican | | Various candidates Other parties | | Margin | | Total votes |
| County | # | % | # | % | # | % | # | % | Total votes |
|---|---|---|---|---|---|---|---|---|---|
| Adams County | | | | | | | | | |
| Antelope County | | | | | | | | | |
| Arthur County | | | | | | | | | |
| Banner County | | | | | | | | | |
| Blaine County | | | | | | | | | |
| Boone County | | | | | | | | | |
| Box Butte County | | | | | | | | | |
| Boyd County | | | | | | | | | |
| Brown County | | | | | | | | | |
| Buffalo County | | | | | | | | | |
| Burt County | | | | | | | | | |
| Butler County | | | | | | | | | |
| Cass County | | | | | | | | | |
| Cedar County | | | | | | | | | |
| Chase County | | | | | | | | | |
| Cherry County | | | | | | | | | |
| Cheyenne County | | | | | | | | | |
| Clay County | | | | | | | | | |
| Colfax County | | | | | | | | | |
| Cuming County | | | | | | | | | |
| Custer County | | | | | | | | | |
| Dakota County | | | | | | | | | |
| Dawes County | | | | | | | | | |
| Dawson County | | | | | | | | | |
| Deuel County | | | | | | | | | |
| Dixon County | | | | | | | | | |
| Dodge County | | | | | | | | | |
| Douglas County | | | | | | | | | |
| Dundy County | | | | | | | | | |
| Fillmore County | | | | | | | | | |
| Franklin County | | | | | | | | | |
| Frontier County | | | | | | | | | |
| Furnas County | | | | | | | | | |
| Gage County | | | | | | | | | |
| Garden County | | | | | | | | | |
| Garfield County | | | | | | | | | |
| Gosper County | | | | | | | | | |
| Grant County | | | | | | | | | |
| Greeley County | | | | | | | | | |
| Hall County | | | | | | | | | |
| Hamilton County | | | | | | | | | |
| Hayes County | | | | | | | | | |
| Hitchcock County | | | | | | | | | |
| Holt County | | | | | | | | | |
| Hooker County | | | | | | | | | |
| Howard County | | | | | | | | | |
| Jefferson County | | | | | | | | | |
| Johnson County | | | | | | | | | |
| Kearney County | | | | | | | | | |
| Keith County | | | | | | | | | |
| Keya Paha County | | | | | | | | | |
| Kimball County | | | | | | | | | |
| Knox County | | | | | | | | | |
| Lancaster County | | | | | | | | | |
| Lincoln County | | | | | | | | | |
| Logan County | | | | | | | | | |
| Loup County | | | | | | | | | |
| Madison County | | | | | | | | | |
| McPherson County | | | | | | | | | |
| Merrick County | | | | | | | | | |
| Morrill County | | | | | | | | | |
| Nance County | | | | | | | | | |
| Nance County | | | | | | | | | |
| Nemaha County | | | | | | | | | |
| Nuckolls County | | | | | | | | | |
| Otoe County | | | | | | | | | |
| Pawnee County | | | | | | | | | |
| Perkins County | | | | | | | | | |
| Phelps County | | | | | | | | | |
| Pierce County | | | | | | | | | |
| Platte County | | | | | | | | | |
| Polk County | | | | | | | | | |
| Red Willow County | | | | | | | | | |
| Richardson County | | | | | | | | | |
| Rock County | | | | | | | | | |
| Saline County | | | | | | | | | |
| Sarpy County | | | | | | | | | |
| Saunders County | | | | | | | | | |
| Scotts Bluff County | | | | | | | | | |
| Seward County | | | | | | | | | |
| Sheridan County | | | | | | | | | |
| Sioux County | | | | | | | | | |
| Stanton County | | | | | | | | | |
| Thayer County | | | | | | | | | |
| Stanton County | | | | | | | | | |
| Thurston County | | | | | | | | | |
| Valley County | | | | | | | | | |
| Washington County | | | | | | | | | |
| Wayne County | | | | | | | | | |
| Webster County | | | | | | | | | |
| Wheeler County | | | | | | | | | |
| York County | | | | | | | | | |
| Totals | | | | | | | | | |

== See also ==
- 1940 Nebraska lieutenant gubernatorial election
