= 1938 Nebraska lieutenant gubernatorial elections =

1938 Nebraska lieutenant gubernatorial regular election
- November 8, 1938
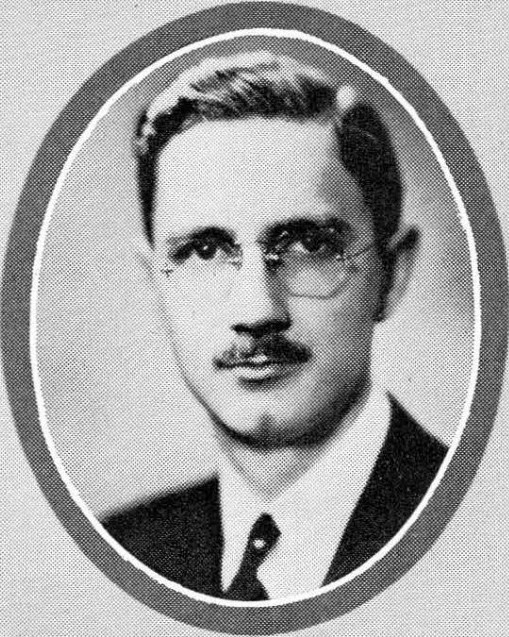

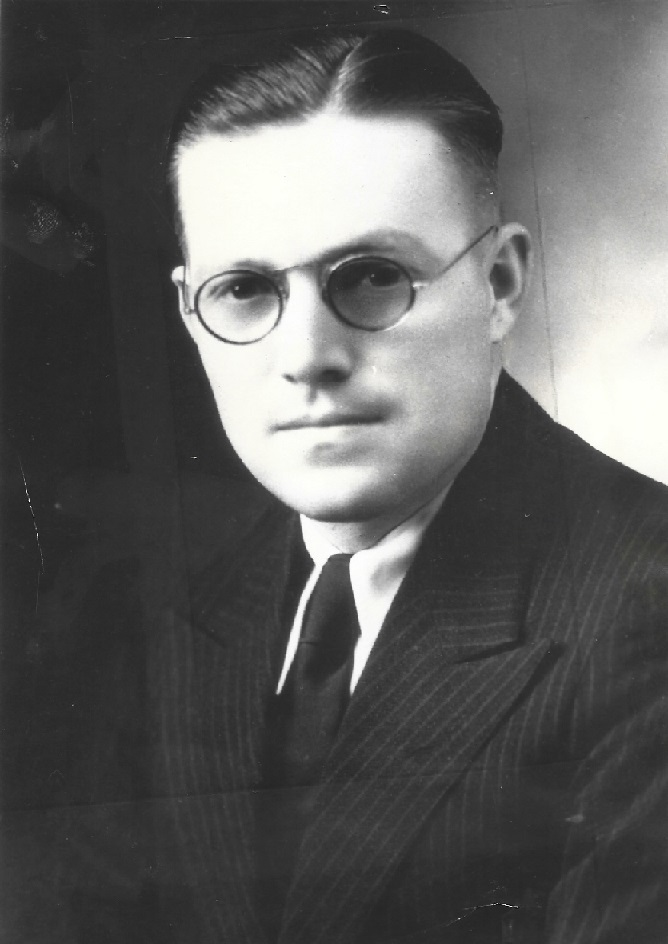

Nominee	William E. Johnson	Terry Carpenter	John B. Elliott Jr.
Party	Republican	Democratic	Independent
Popular vote	226,363	215,725	24,872
Percentage	48.5%	46.2%	5.3%
Lieutenant Governor before election
Walter H. Jurgensen
(removed June 26, 1938)
Democratic
Elected Lieutenant Governor
William E. Johnson
Republican

The 1938 Nebraska lieutenant gubernatorial elections were both held on November 8, 1938. Incumbent Nebraska Lieutenant Governor Walter H. Jurgensen was convicted of a felony in March 1938 and barred from running for a fourth term as lieutenant governor in June, 1938, leaving the 1938 lieutenant gubernatorial race wide open. The vacancy caused by his removal from office brought about two elections for lieutenant governor in 1938: the regular election which always happened biennially and a special election to fill the vacancy.

The regular election, which was held to elect a lieutenant governor for the term from January 5, 1939, to January 9, 1941, featured William E. Johnson, the Republican nominee, defeating the Democratic nominee, former US Representative Terry Carpenter, and independent candidate John B. Elliott Jr.

The special election, which was held to elect a lieutenant governor to finish out the vacant term of Walter H. Jurgensen for its two remaining months from November 8, 1938, to January 5, 1939, featured Nate M. Parsons, the Democratic nominee, defeating Republican nominee Jack S. Kroh.

== Regular election ==
=== Democratic primary ===
==== Candidates ====
- Terry Carpenter, former US Representative from Nebraska from 1933 to 1935, unsuccessful candidate for Governor of Nebraska in 1934, and unsuccessful Democratic nominee for US Senate in 1936.
- Glen E. Carpenter
- James Franklin Christie, candidate for the Democratic nomination for Governor of Nebraska in 1928 and 1932
- Martin L. Gable
- Edward D. McKim, former member of the Nebraska House of Representatives from Omaha, Nebraska
- George E. Nickles, former member of the Nebraska House of Representatives from Murray, Nebraska
- William H. O'Gara, former member of the Nebraska House of Representatives from Laurel, Nebraska
- Oscar L. Osterlund
- Henry Pedersen, former member of the Nebraska Senate from Guide Rock, Nebraska
- Henry F. Schepman, former member of the Nebraska House of Representatives and the Nebraska Senate from Tecumseh, Nebraska, and candidate for the Democratic nomination for lieutenant governor in 1932
- Asa D. Scott
- H. B. Shellenbarger, former member of the Nebraska Senate from Stamford, Nebraska
- Phil A. Tomek, attorney and former member of the Nebraska House of Representatives and the Nebraska Senate from David City, Nebraska

==== Results ====
Democratic primary results
Party	Candidate	Votes	%
Democratic	Terry Carpenter	45,934	32.09
Democratic	Edward D. McKim	17,356	12.13
Democratic	H. B. Shellenbarger	14,916	10.42
Democratic	Phil A. Tomek	12,464	8.71
Democratic	William H. O'Gara	11,692	8.17
Democratic	Glen E. Carpenter	9,372	6.55
Democratic	Henry F. Schepman	7,515	5.25
Democratic	Henry Pedersen	7,157	5.00
Democratic	George E. Nickles	4,866	3.40
Democratic	Oscar L. Osterlund	3,377	2.36
Democratic	Asa D. Scott	3,373	2.36
Democratic	Martin L. Gable	3,171	2.22
Democratic	James Franklin Christie	1,940	1.36

=== Republican primary ===
==== Candidates ====
- Leo J. Crosby from Omaha, Nebraska
- C. A. "Doc" Green, candidate for the Republican nomination for lieutenant governor in 1934 and 1936 from Lincoln, Nebraska
- William E. Johnson, practicing accountant, writer of economic articles for financial journals, and political newcomer from Schuyler, Nebraska
- Harry C. Moore from Lincoln, Nebraska
- Robert A. Nelson
- Clarence Reckmeyer from Fremont, Nebraska
- Arthur B. Walker, physician from Lincoln, Nebraska

==== Results ====
Republican primary results
Party	Candidate	Votes	%
Republican	William E. Johnson	22,801	20.08
Republican	Robert A. Nelson	19,449	17.13
Republican	Leo J. Crosby	19,023	16.75
Republican	Harry C. Moore	17,182	15.13
Republican	C. A. Green	12,462	10.97
Republican	Clarence Reckmeyer	11,695	10.30
Republican	Arthur B. Walker	10,938	9.63

=== General election ===
In the general election, in addition to Republican nominee William E. Johnson and Democratic nominee Terry Carpenter, John B. Elliott Jr. filed to run as an independent candidate by petition. Elliott was a farmer and farm implement dealer from Alvo, Nebraska, who portrayed himself as a political outsider and nonpolitical candidate.

==== Results ====
Nebraska lieutenant gubernatorial election, 1938
Party	Candidate	Votes	%
Republican	William E. Johnson	226,363	48.48
Democratic	Terry Carpenter	215,725	46.20
Independent	John B. Elliott Jr.	24,872	5.33
Total votes		466,960	100.00
Republican gain from Democratic			

== Special election ==
1938 Nebraska lieutenant gubernatorial special election
- November 8, 1938

Nominee	Nate M. Parsons	Jack S. Kroh
Party	Democratic	Republican
Popular vote	229,780	142,557
Percentage	61.7%	38.3%
Lieutenant Governor before election
Walter H. Jurgensen
(removed June 26, 1938)
Democratic
Elected Lieutenant Governor
Nate M. Parsons
Democratic

On March 7, 1938, incumbent Nebraska Lieutenant Governor Walter H. Jurgensen was convicted of a felony for embezzling $549 in a stock transaction between a co-defendant and a railroad station agent in September 1934. Jurgensen contested the conviction and sought to be renominated for a fourth term as lieutenant governor, but he was declared ineligible to participate in the primary. He was then removed from office by the Nebraska Supreme Court on June 25, 1938, leaving the lieutenant governor's office vacant. The Nebraska Supreme Court ruled that the lieutenant governor's office became vacant on March 7 when he had been convicted of a felony since Article III, Section 23, of the Nebraska State Constitution provided at the time that "All offices created by this constitution shall become vacant by... conviction of a felony."

Since the lieutenant governor's office was now vacant, there was mixed opinion on how to handle this vacancy. The office of Nebraska lieutenant governor had not been vacant since Nebraska Lieutenant Governor Melville R. Hopewell died while in office on May 2, 1911. At the time, the president pro tempore of the Nebraska State Senate, John H. Morehead, was considered the "Acting Lieutenant Governor" based on Article V, Section 18, of the Nebraska Constitution which provided that "If there be no lieutenant governor..., the president [pro tempore] of the senate shall act as governor until the vacancy is filled...."

Based on this precedent, some believed that the Speaker of the Nebraska Legislature should assume the office of the lieutenant governor. Then Nebraska Attorney General Richard C. Hunter issued an opinion based on this precedent that then Speaker of the Nebraska Legislature Charles J. Warner (who was also a candidate for governor) could perform the duties of the lieutenant governor without assuming the office. Others believed that then Nebraska Governor Roy Cochran had the authority to appoint a lieutenant governor to fill the vacancy. When asked about Jurgensen's removal from office, Cochran said that he didn't think it was necessary to appoint a lieutenant governor at that time because "There is no necessity for haste. If the legislature were in session... it would be a different matter" since the Nebraska lieutenant governor presides over sessions of the legislature.

Others believed that, under certain Nebraska laws, a special election needed to be held to fill the vacancy. Among these was Nate M. Parsons, a pharmacist from Lincoln, Nebraska, who filed to run for the vacant term of lieutenant governor very shortly before the deadline for filing to run in the primary elections. Parsons argued, among other things, that Article IV, Section 18, of the Nebraska Constitution, which provided that "If there be no lieutenant governor... the president of the senate shall act as governor until the vacancy is filled," and Article V, Section 21, which provided that "Vacancies in ...elective offices shall be filled by election," meant that if the governor did not appoint someone to the office of lieutenant governor, then it was to be filled by special election. Nebraska Secretary of State Harry Swanson, who received Parsons' filing, asked Nebraska Attorney General Hunter to issue an opinion on the matter.

Nebraska Attorney General Richard Hunter issued his opinion declaring that Parsons was correct. The opinion stated that, under Nebraska law, since there was "no special constitutional provision for filling of a vacancy in the office of Lieutenant Governor" and "since the vacancy occurred more than thirty days prior to the November election," the Nebraska Secretary of State should therefore "accept the filing made [by Parsons]." The Attorney General also ordered that "In making up the ballot at the primary and general elections respectively, separate places should be provided for voting for Lieutenant Governor for the full term and for Lieutenant Governor for the unexpired term." In 1938, the Nebraska primary elections were held on August 9.

Because it was uncertain how a vacancy in the office of lieutenant governor was to be handled and whether or not there would even be a special election, no filings were made to run in the special election until Parsons made his last-minute filing before the deadline. Thus, he was the only candidate of any party to run in the primaries for the special election for lieutenant governor.

=== Democratic primary ===
==== Candidates ====
Nate M. Parsons, a pharmacist from Lincoln, Nebraska, who had been active in Democratic party politics in the past, ran unopposed since he was the only person to file before the deadline.

==== Results ====
Democratic primary results
Party	Candidate	Votes	%
Democratic	Nate M. Parsons	96,321	100.0

=== Republican primary ===
Because of the uncertainty over the handling of the vacancy of lieutenant governor, no Republican primary was held for the lieutenant gubernatorial special election. However, at the Republican state convention, which took place after the primaries, Jack S. Kroh was nominated to run for the vacant term of lieutenant governor. Because of this, Kroh had to run "by petition" and thus was not listed as a "Republican" on the ballot. Jack S. Kroh, from Ogallala, Nebraska, was the owner and publisher of the Keith County News. He was a former president of the Nebraska Press Association and a former member of the Nebraska State Senate from 1923 to 1924.

=== General election ===
==== Results ====
Nebraska lieutenant gubernatorial special election, 1938
Party	Candidate	Votes	%
Democratic	Nate M. Parsons	229,780	61.71
Republican	Jack S. Kroh	142,557	38.29
Total votes		372,337	100.00
Democratic hold			

=== Aftermath ===
After winning the special election for lieutenant governor to fill the vacancy, Nate M. Parsons took office immediately after he had qualified. He was sworn into office on November 14, 1938, and served until January 5, 1939. Since the legislative session began on January 3, 1939, but Lieutenant Governor-elect William E. Johnson did not take office until January 5, Parsons presided over the first two days of the legislative session. The Nebraska Legislature later officially voted to thank him "for the impartial manner in which he opened and presided over the organization of the Fifty-third Session of the Nebraska Legislature."

== See also ==
- 1938 Nebraska gubernatorial election
