= 1936 Nebraska lieutenant gubernatorial election =

- November 3, 1936

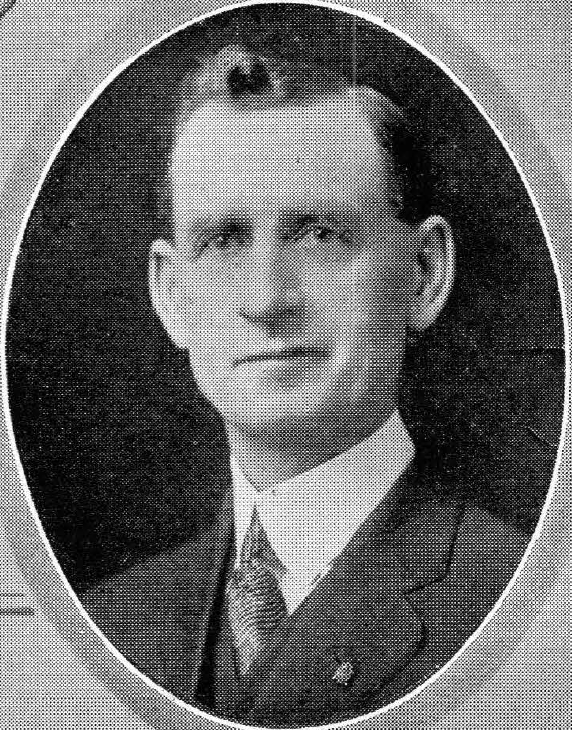
Nominee	Walter H. Jurgensen	George A. Williams
Party	Democratic	Republican
Popular vote	314,404	232,583
Percentage	57.5%	42.5%
- County results Jurgensen: 50–60% 60–70% 70–80% Williams: 50–60%
Lieutenant Governor before election
Walter H. Jurgensen
Democratic
Elected Lieutenant Governor
Walter H. Jurgensen
Democratic

The 1936 Nebraska lieutenant gubernatorial election was held on November 3, 1936, and featured incumbent Nebraska Lieutenant Governor Walter H. Jurgensen, a Democrat, defeating Republican nominee George A. Williams, who was a former Nebraska Lieutenant Governor.

== Democratic primary ==
=== Candidates ===
- Edgar Howard, former Nebraska Lieutenant Governor from 1917 to 1919, former US Representative from 1923 to 1935 who lost reelection in 1934, and publisher of the Columbus Telegram newspaper from Columbus, Nebraska
- Walter H. Jurgensen, incumbent Nebraska Lieutenant Governor

=== Results ===
Democratic primary results
Party	Candidate	Votes	%
Democratic	Walter H. Jurgensen (incumbent)	81,126	61.84
Democratic	Edgar Howard	50,071	38.16

== Republican primary ==
In addition to the six candidates who ran in the Republican primary listed below, a petition was filed by 38 Republicans from Lancaster County for Theodore W. Metcalfe, former Nebraska Lieutenant Governor from 1931 to 1933 and unsuccessful candidate for Governor of Nebraska in 1934, to run for his old office of lieutenant governor. Metcalfe notified the Nebraska Secretary of State that he would not accept the petition to run for lieutenant governor and thus was not a candidate for the Republican nomination in 1936.

=== Candidates ===
- C. A. "Doc" Green, candidate for the Republican nomination for lieutenant governor in 1934 from Lincoln, Nebraska
- Albert T. Howard, member of the Nebraska Senate from Scottsbluff, Nebraska
- Jess P. Palmer, from Omaha, Nebraska
- A. A. Rezac, from Omaha, Nebraska
- Murray F. Rickard, former member of the Nebraska Senate and the Nebraska House of Representatives from Guide Rock, Nebraska, and unsuccessful candidate for the Republican nomination for Nebraska Governor in 1932
- George A. Williams, former Nebraska Lieutenant Governor from 1925 to 1931 and unsuccessful candidate for the Republican nomination for Nebraska Governor in 1932 from Fairmont, Nebraska

=== Results ===
Republican primary results
Party	Candidate	Votes	%
Republican	George A. Williams	34,217	32.21
Republican	Albert T. Howard	21,770	20.49
Republican	Jess P. Palmer	21,556	20.29
Republican	C. A. Green	16,799	15.81
Republican	Murray F. Rickard	7,267	6.84
Republican	A. A. Rezac	4,611	4.34
Scattering		3	

== General election ==
=== Results ===
Nebraska lieutenant gubernatorial election, 1936
Party	Candidate	Votes	%
Democratic	Walter H. Jurgensen (incumbent)	314,404	57.48
Republican	George A. Williams	232,583	42.52
Total votes		546,987	100.00
Democratic hold			

== Aftermath ==
On March 7, 1938, incumbent Nebraska Lieutenant Governor Walter H. Jurgensen was convicted of a felony for embezzling $549 in a stock transaction between a co-defendant and a railroad station agent in September 1934. Jurgensen contested the conviction and sought to be renominated for a fourth term as lieutenant governor, but he was declared ineligible to participate in the primary. He was then removed from office by the Nebraska Supreme Court on June 25, 1938, leaving the lieutenant governor's office vacant. This caused two elections, a regular and a special election, to be held for the office of lieutenant governor in 1938.

== See also ==
- 1936 Nebraska gubernatorial election
