= 1930 Nebraska lieutenant gubernatorial election =

- November 4, 1930

Nominee	Theodore W. Metcalfe	James C. Agee
Party	Republican	Democratic
Popular vote	243,392	154,281
Percentage	61.2%	38.8%
Lieutenant Governor before election
George A. Williams
Republican
Elected Lieutenant Governor
Theodore W. Metcalfe
Republican

The 1930 Nebraska lieutenant gubernatorial election was held on November 8, 1932, and featured Theodore W. Metcalfe, the Republican nominee, defeating Democratic nominee James C. Agee. The incumbent lieutenant governor George A. Williams decided not to seek reelection.

== Democratic primary ==
=== Candidates ===
Dr. James C. Agee ran unopposed in the Democratic primary. He was a physician from Fremont, Nebraska. Lawrence J. Meyer of Hay Springs, Nebraska, had apparently also filed to run for the Democratic nomination, but by the date of the primary on August 12, 1930, he was no longer a candidate.

=== Results ===
Democratic primary results
Party	Candidate	Votes	%
Democratic	James C. Agee	60,335	100.0

== Republican primary ==
=== Candidates ===
- Bern R. Coulter, member of the Nebraska House of Representatives since 1925 from Bridgeport, Nebraska
- Donald Gallagher, former member of the Nebraska House of Representatives from 1923 to 1925 from O'Neill, Nebraska
- James A. Gardner, publisher of the Western Nebraska Beacon newspaper from Lewellen, Nebraska
- Theodore W. Metcalfe, son of current Democratic Omaha Mayor Richard Lee Metcalfe, lawyer, and secretary-treasurer of the Metcalfe Company in Omaha, Nebraska
- G. Eli Simon, former county attorney of Furnas County, Nebraska, city attorney of Cambridge, Nebraska, and member of the board of trustees of Doane College

=== Results ===
Republican primary results
Party	Candidate	Votes	%
Republican	Theodore W. Metcalfe	61,579	38.51
Republican	Eli Simon	28,681	17.94
Republican	James A. Gardner	25,674	16.06
Republican	Bern R. Coulter	22,662	14.17
Republican	Donald Gallagher	21,306	13.32

== General election ==
=== Results ===
Nebraska lieutenant gubernatorial election, 1930
Party	Candidate	Votes	%
Republican	Theodore W. Metcalfe	243,392	61.20
Democratic	James C. Agee	154,281	38.80
Total votes		397,673	100.00
Republican hold			

== See also ==
- 1930 Nebraska gubernatorial election
