= 1954 Nebraska gubernatorial election =

- November 2, 1954
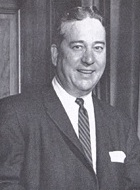

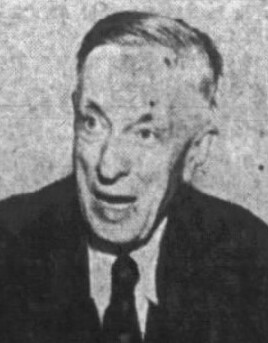
Nominee	Victor Anderson	William Ritchie
Party	Republican	Democratic
Popular vote	250,080	164,753
Percentage	60.28%	39.72%
- County results Anderson: 50–60% 60–70% 70–80% Ritchie: 50–60%
Governor before election
Robert B. Crosby
Republican
Elected Governor
Victor Anderson
Republican

The 1954 Nebraska gubernatorial election was held on November 2, 1954, and featured Mayor of Lincoln Victor Anderson, the Republican nominee, defeating Democratic nominee, attorney William Ritchie.

== Democratic primary ==
=== Candidates ===
- Mabel Fossler
- P. J. Heaton, former city attorney for Sidney, Nebraska, and candidate in the Democratic primary for governor in 1944
- William Ritchie, attorney, Democratic nominee for United States Senate in 1952, and candidate for the Democratic nomination for Governor of Nebraska in 1932
- Andrew E. Swanson, farmer from near Polk, Nebraska, and unsuccessful Republican primary candidate for lieutenant governor in 1944, governor in 1946 and 1948, and again for lieutenant governor in 1950 after failing to switch to the Democratic Party soon enough in 1950. Swanson was recognized as a perennial candidate.

=== Results ===
Democratic primary results
Party	Candidate	Votes	%
Democratic	William Ritchie	39,127	53.18
Democratic	P. J. Heaton	18,481	25.12
Democratic	Andrew E. Swanson	12,633	17.17
Democratic	Mabel Fossler	3,312	4.50
Democratic	Write-in	25	0.03

== Republican primary ==
=== Candidates ===
- Victor Anderson, Mayor of Lincoln and former member of the Nebraska Legislature
- James L. Bourret
- Clarence R. Bristol
- Louis H. Hector
- John McKernan
- Frederick H. Wagener, Lancaster County Attorney
- Arthur B. Walker, physician and perennial candidate in the Republican primaries (who ran for governor in 1952, 1950, 1948, 1946, and for lieutenant governor in 1938)

=== Results ===
Republican primary results
Party	Candidate	Votes	%
Republican	Victor Anderson	91,624	60.24
Republican	Frederick H. Wagener	40,140	26.39
Republican	Clarence R. Bristol	6,654	4.38
Republican	Arthur B. Walker	5,664	3.72
Republican	John McKernan	3,374	2.22
Republican	James L. Bourret	3,319	2.18
Republican	Louis H. Hector	1,295	0.85
Republican	Write-in	19	0.01

== General election ==
=== Results ===
1954 Nebraska gubernatorial election
Party	Candidate	Votes	%
Republican	Victor Anderson	250,080	60.28%
Democratic	William Ritchie	164,753	39.72%
Write-in	Others	8	>0.01%
Total votes		414,841	100.0%
Republican hold			

==== By County ====
By county

County	Person Democratic		Person Republican		Various candidates Other parties		Margin		Total votes
County	#	%	#	%	#	%	#	%	Total votes
Adams County									
Antelope County									
Arthur County									
Banner County									
Blaine County									
Boone County									
Box Butte County									
Boyd County									
Brown County									
Buffalo County									
Burt County									
Butler County									
Cass County									
Cedar County									
Chase County									
Cherry County									
Cheyenne County									
Clay County									
Colfax County									
Cuming County									
Custer County									
Dakota County									
Dawes County									
Dawson County									
Deuel County									
Dixon County									
Dodge County									
Douglas County									
Dundy County									
Fillmore County									
Franklin County									
Frontier County									
Furnas County									
Gage County									
Garden County									
Garfield County									
Gosper County									
Grant County									
Greeley County									
Hall County									
Hamilton County									
Hayes County									
Hitchcock County									
Holt County									
Hooker County									
Howard County									
Jefferson County									
Johnson County									
Kearney County									
Keith County									
Keya Paha County									
Kimball County									
Knox County									
Lancaster County									
Lincoln County									
Logan County									
Loup County									
Madison County									
McPherson County									
Merrick County									
Morrill County									
Nance County									
Nance County									
Nemaha County									
Nuckolls County									
Otoe County									
Pawnee County									
Perkins County									
Phelps County									
Pierce County									
Platte County									
Polk County									
Red Willow County									
Richardson County									
Rock County									
Saline County									
Sarpy County									
Saunders County									
Scotts Bluff County									
Seward County									
Sheridan County									
Sioux County									
Stanton County									
Thayer County									
Stanton County									
Thurston County									
Valley County									
Washington County									
Wayne County									
Webster County									
Wheeler County									
York County									
Totals									

== See also ==
- 1954 Nebraska lieutenant gubernatorial election
