= 1928 Nebraska lieutenant gubernatorial election =

- November 6, 1928
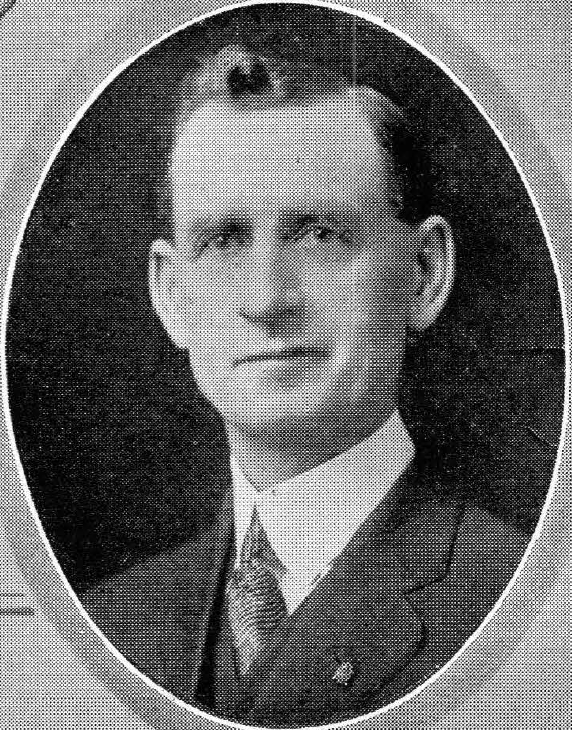

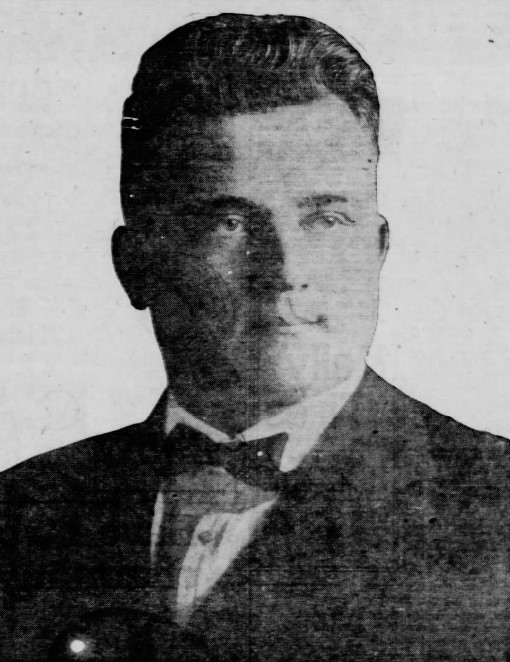
Nominee	George A. Williams	Frank A. Dutton
Party	Republican	Democratic
Popular vote	311,256	200,868
Percentage	60.3%	38.9%
Lieutenant Governor before election
George A. Williams
Republican
Elected Lieutenant Governor
George A. Williams
Republican

The 1928 Nebraska lieutenant gubernatorial election was held on November 6, 1928, and featured incumbent Nebraska Lieutenant Governor George A. Williams, a Republican, defeating Democratic nominee Frank A. Dutton. For the two major candidates, this election was a rematch of the previous Nebraska lieutenant gubernatorial election in 1926.

== Democratic primary ==
=== Candidates ===
- Frank A. Dutton, former city attorney of Beatrice, Nebraska, and unsuccessful candidate for lieutenant governor in 1926
- Dr. Alexander T. Gatewood, dentist from McCook, Nebraska, and past candidate for Nebraska Secretary of State in 1908 who died later in 1928

=== Results ===
Democratic primary results
Party	Candidate	Votes	%
Democratic	Frank A. Dutton	38,483	62.53
Democratic	Alexander T. Gatewood	23,056	37.47

== Republican primary ==
=== Candidates ===
- John L. Riddell, county attorney of York County, Nebraska
- George A. Williams, incumbent Nebraska Lieutenant Governor

=== Results ===
Republican primary results
Party	Candidate	Votes	%
Republican	George A. Williams (incumbent)	79,986	64.43
Republican	John L. Riddell	44,162	35.57

== General election ==
=== Results ===
Nebraska lieutenant gubernatorial election, 1928
Party	Candidate	Votes	%
Republican	George A. Williams (incumbent)	311,256	60.30
Democratic	Frank A. Dutton	200,868	38.91
Socialist	Samuel Lerner	4,079	0.79
Total votes		516,203	100.00
Republican hold			

== See also ==
- 1928 Nebraska gubernatorial election
