= 1936 Nebraska gubernatorial election =

- November 3, 1936
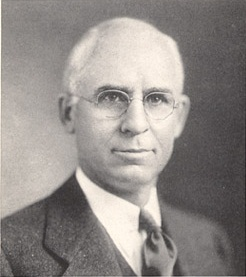

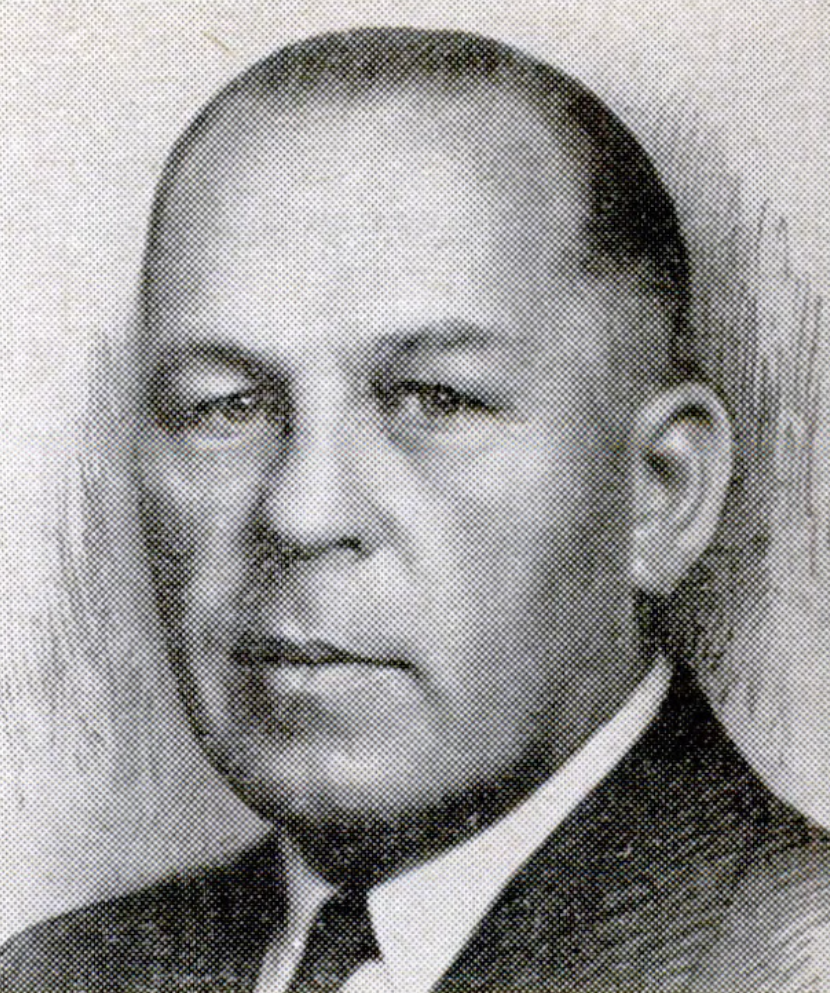
Nominee	Robert L. Cochran	Dwight Griswold
Party	Democratic	Republican
Popular vote	333,412	257,267
Percentage	55.90%	43.13%
- County results Cochran: 40–50% 50–60% 60–70% Griswold: 40–50% 50–60% 60–70% 70–80%
Governor before election
Robert L. Cochran
Democratic
Elected Governor
Robert L. Cochran
Democratic

The 1936 Nebraska gubernatorial election was held on November 3, 1936.

The election featured incumbent Governor Robert L. Cochran, a Democrat, who defeated the Republican nominee, newspaper publisher and former state legislator Dwight Griswold, to win a second two-year term in office.

Former State Attorney General Ora S. Spillman unsuccessfully ran for the Republican nomination.

== Democratic primary ==
=== Candidates ===
- Robert L. Cochran, incumbent Governor
- Anton H. Jensen, unsuccessful candidate for Governor of Nebraska in 1930

=== Results ===
Democratic primary results
Party	Candidate	Votes	%
Democratic	Robert L. Cochran (incumbent)	112,853	79.43
Democratic	Anton H. Jensen	29,229	20.57

== Republican primary ==
=== Candidates ===
- Dwight Griswold, newspaper publisher and former member of the Nebraska Legislature; unsuccessful Republican candidate for Governor of Nebraska in 1932 and 1934
- William Madgett, former mayor of Hastings, Nebraska
- Ora S. Spillman, former Nebraska Attorney General from 1923 to 1929
- Stanley Wright

=== Results ===
Republican primary results
Party	Candidate	Votes	%
Republican	Dwight Griswold	85,331	68.54
Republican	Ora S. Spillman	24,510	19.69
Republican	William Madgett	8,607	6.91
Republican	Stanley Wright	6,055	4.86

== General election ==
=== Results ===
Nebraska gubernatorial election, 1936
Party	Candidate	Votes	%
Democratic	Robert L. Cochran (incumbent)	333,412	55.90%
Republican	Dwight Griswold	257,267	43.13%
Independent	Peter Mehrens	5,746	0.96%
Total votes		596,425	100.0%
Democratic hold			

==== By County ====
By county

County	Person Democratic		Person Republican		Various candidates Other parties		Margin		Total votes
County	#	%	#	%	#	%	#	%	Total votes
Adams County									
Antelope County									
Arthur County									
Banner County									
Blaine County									
Boone County									
Box Butte County									
Boyd County									
Brown County									
Buffalo County									
Burt County									
Butler County									
Cass County									
Cedar County									
Chase County									
Cherry County									
Cheyenne County									
Clay County									
Colfax County									
Cuming County									
Custer County									
Dakota County									
Dawes County									
Dawson County									
Deuel County									
Dixon County									
Dodge County									
Douglas County									
Dundy County									
Fillmore County									
Franklin County									
Frontier County									
Furnas County									
Gage County									
Garden County									
Garfield County									
Gosper County									
Grant County									
Greeley County									
Hall County									
Hamilton County									
Hayes County									
Hitchcock County									
Holt County									
Hooker County									
Howard County									
Jefferson County									
Johnson County									
Kearney County									
Keith County									
Keya Paha County									
Kimball County									
Knox County									
Lancaster County									
Lincoln County									
Logan County									
Loup County									
Madison County									
McPherson County									
Merrick County									
Morrill County									
Nance County									
Nance County									
Nemaha County									
Nuckolls County									
Otoe County									
Pawnee County									
Perkins County									
Phelps County									
Pierce County									
Platte County									
Polk County									
Red Willow County									
Richardson County									
Rock County									
Saline County									
Sarpy County									
Saunders County									
Scotts Bluff County									
Seward County									
Sheridan County									
Sioux County									
Stanton County									
Thayer County									
Stanton County									
Thurston County									
Valley County									
Washington County									
Wayne County									
Webster County									
Wheeler County									
York County									
Totals									

== See also ==
- 1936 Nebraska lieutenant gubernatorial election
