= Ulysses Township =

Ulysses Township may refer to one of the following places within the United States:

- Ulysses Township, Butler County, Nebraska
- Ulysses Township, Pennsylvania

See also

- Ulysses (disambiguation)
