= 1924 Nebraska lieutenant gubernatorial election =

- November 4, 1924
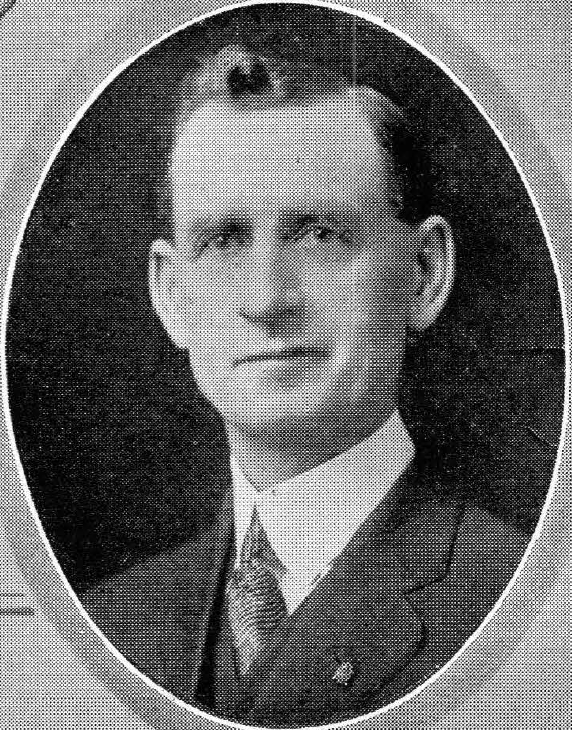

| Nominee | George A. Williams | P. J. Mullin | Granville Hummer |
| Party | Republican | Democratic | Progressive Party (United States, 1924) |
| Popular vote | 219,965 | 167,018 | 30,797 |
| Percentage | 51.3% | 39.0% | 7.2% |
- County results Williams: 30–40% 40–50% 50–60% 60–70% Mullin: 40–50% 50–60% 60–70%
Lieutenant Governor before election
Fred G. Johnson
Republican
Elected Lieutenant Governor
George A. Williams
Republican

The 1924 Nebraska lieutenant gubernatorial election was held on November 4, 1924, and featured Republican nominee George A. Williams defeating Democratic nominee P. J. Mullin as well as Progressive nominee Granville Hummer and Prohibition nominee J. F. Webster. Incumbent Nebraska Lieutenant Governor Fred G. Johnson, a Republican, chose not to seek reelection to the office of lieutenant governor in order to challenge George W. Norris for the Republican nomination for US Senate from Nebraska.

== Democratic primary ==
=== Candidates ===
- James P. Connolly, former member of the Nebraska House of Representatives from 1909 to 1911 from Omaha, Nebraska
- Frank Mills, former member of the Nebraska House of Representatives from 1917 to 1919 from Lincoln, Nebraska
- Patrick John "P. J." Mullin, farmer and businessman from near Albion, Nebraska who was the Democratic nominee for lieutenant governor in 1922

=== Results ===
Democratic primary results
| Party | Candidate | Votes | % |
|---|---|---|---|
| Democratic | P. J. Mullin | 27,522 | 43.82 |
| Democratic | Frank Mills | 20,620 | 32.83 |
| Democratic | James P. Connolly | 14,670 | 23.36 |

== Progressive primary ==
=== Candidates ===
- Granville Hummer
- Grant Mears
- Frank Mills
- P. J. Mullin

=== Results ===
Progressive primary results
| Party | Candidate | Votes | % |
|---|---|---|---|
| Progressive Party (United States, 1924) | Granville Hummer | 28 | 50.91 |
| Progressive Party (United States, 1924) | Grant Mears | 18 | 32.73 |
| Progressive Party (United States, 1924) | Frank Mills | 7 | 12.73 |
| Progressive Party (United States, 1924) | P. J. Mullin | 2 | 3.64 |

== Prohibition primary ==
=== Candidates ===
J. F. Webster from St. Paul, Nebraska, ran unopposed in the Prohibition Party primary. He was the owner and publisher of The Phonograph, a newspaper in Howard County, Nebraska.

=== Results ===
Prohibition primary results
| Party | Candidate | Votes | % |
|---|---|---|---|
| Prohibition | J. F. Webster | 65 | 100.0 |

== Republican primary ==
=== Candidates ===
- Thomas E. Conley, attorney from Omaha, Nebraska, who was previously a member of the Nebraska House of Representatives from 1915 to 1919 representing Gage, Jefferson, and Thayer counties
- John M. MacFarland, former member of the Nebraska Senate from 1913 to 1915 from Omaha, Nebraska
- Grant S. Mears, member of the Nebraska House of Representatives since 1915 from Wayne, Nebraska
- George A. Williams, farmer and former member of the Nebraska House of Representatives from 1919 to 1923 from Fairmont, Nebraska

=== Results ===
Republican primary results
| Party | Candidate | Votes | % |
|---|---|---|---|
| Republican | George A. Williams | 34,974 | 35.16 |
| Republican | Grant S. Mears | 25,902 | 26.04 |
| Republican | John M. MacFarland | 24,854 | 20.30 |
| Republican | Thomas E. Conley | 13,753 | 13.82 |

== General election ==
=== Results ===
Nebraska lieutenant gubernatorial election, 1924
| Party | Candidate | Votes | % |
|---|---|---|---|
| Republican | George A. Williams | 219,965 | 51.29 |
| Democratic | P. J. Mullin | 167,018 | 38.95 |
| Progressive Party (United States, 1924) | Granville Hummer | 30,797 | 7.18 |
| Prohibition | J. F. Webster | 11,064 | 2.58 |
| Total votes | | 428,844 | 100.00 |
| Republican hold | | | |

== See also ==
- 1924 Nebraska gubernatorial election
