= 1940 Nebraska lieutenant gubernatorial election =

- November 5, 1940
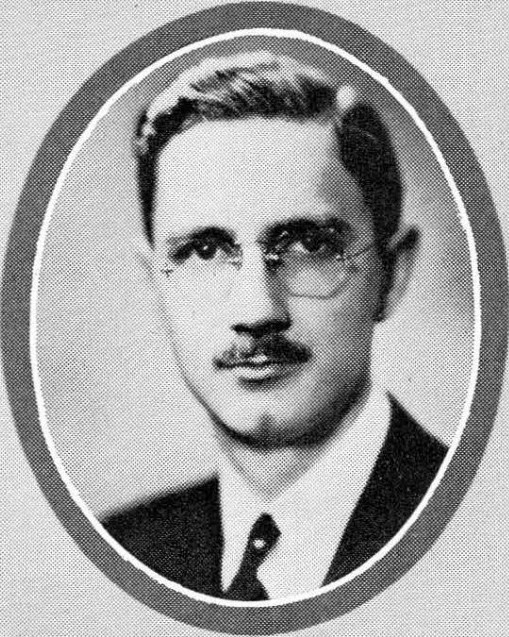

Nominee	William E. Johnson	William H. Diers
Party	Republican	Democratic
Popular vote	330,313	218,161
Percentage	60.2%	39.8%
Lieutenant Governor before election
William E. Johnson
Republican
Elected Lieutenant Governor
William E. Johnson
Republican

The 1940 Nebraska lieutenant gubernatorial election was held on November 5, 1940, and featured incumbent Nebraska Lieutenant Governor William E. Johnson, a Republican, defeating Democratic nominee and Speaker of the Nebraska Legislature William H. Diers.

== Democratic primary ==
=== Candidates ===
- William H. Diers, Speaker of the Nebraska Legislature and member of the Nebraska Legislature from District 24
- John B. Elliott Jr., former independent candidate for lieutenant governor in 1938
- Peter Mehrens
- Arthur L. Neumann, former president pro tempore of the Nebraska Senate from 1935 to 1936 and member of the Nebraska Senate from 1927 to 1937 from Oakland, Nebraska
- Nate M. Parsons, former Nebraska Lieutenant Governor for a short term to fill the vacancy from November 8, 1938, to January 5, 1939, after winning the special election in 1938.

=== Results ===
Democratic primary results
Party	Candidate	Votes	%
Democratic	William H. Diers	28,171	23.85
Democratic	Peter Mehrens	25,999	22.02
Democratic	Arthur L. Neumann	22,705	19.23
Democratic	Nate M. Parsons	21,936	18.58
Democratic	John B. Elliott, Jr.	19,283	16.33

== Republican primary ==
=== Candidates ===
- Frank A. High
- William E. Johnson, incumbent Nebraska Lieutenant Governor
- John B. Peterson
- Harry L. Reed, insurance agent and property manager in Lincoln, Nebraska

=== Results ===
Republican primary results
Party	Candidate	Votes	%
Republican	William E. Johnson (incumbent)	55,364	38.57
Republican	Harry L. Reed	40,426	28.16
Republican	John B. Peterson	24,017	16.73
Republican	Frank A. High	23,744	16.54

== General election ==
=== Results ===
Nebraska lieutenant gubernatorial election, 1940
Party	Candidate	Votes	%
Republican	William E. Johnson (incumbent)	330,313	60.22
Democratic	William H. Diers	218,161	39.78
Total votes		548,474	100.00
Republican hold			

== See also ==
- 1940 Nebraska gubernatorial election
