= Ulysses, Nebraska =

Village in Nebraska, US

- Village
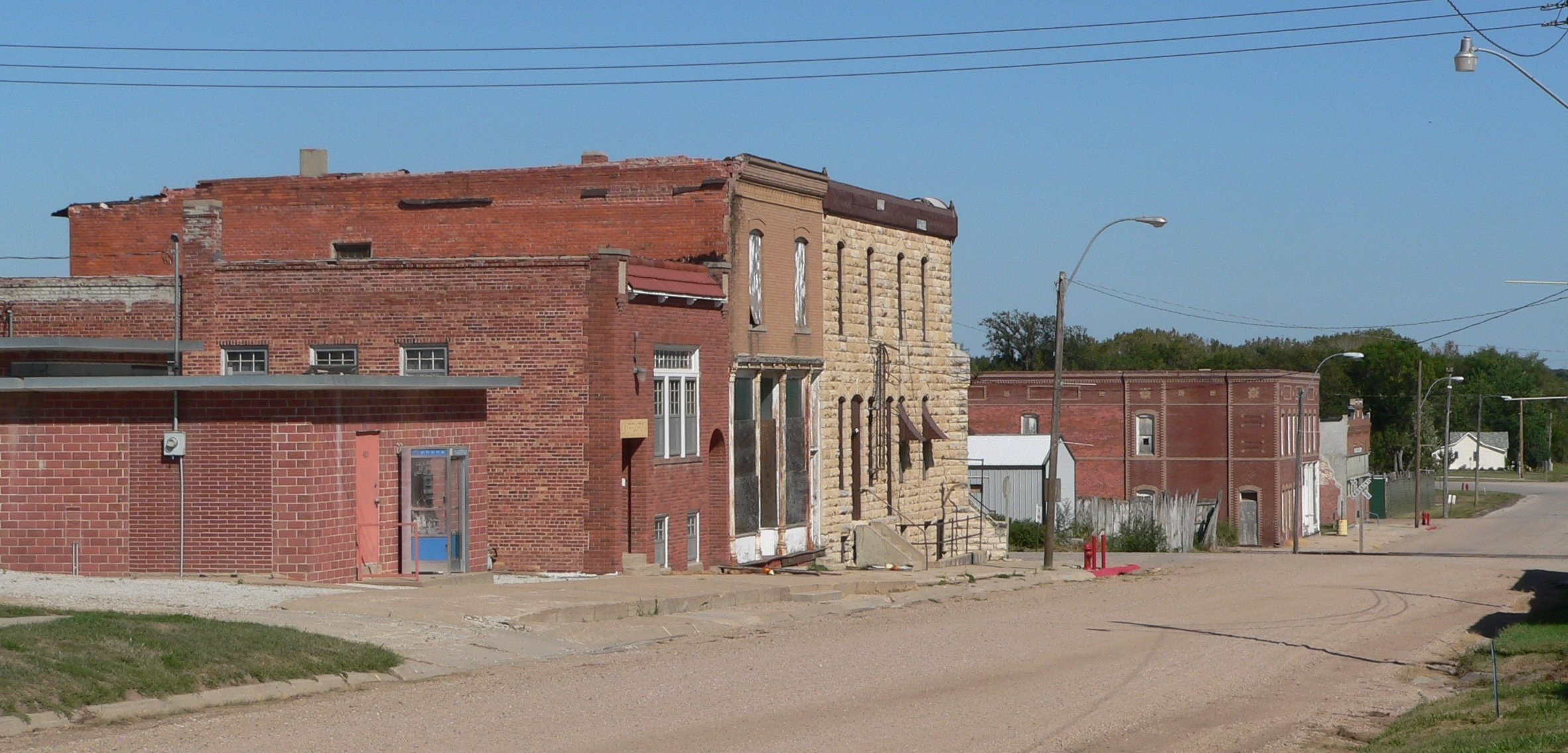
- Downtown Ulysses: C Street

- Location of Ulysses, Nebraska

- Location within Nebraska Location within the United States
- Coordinates: 41°04′19″N 97°12′11″W
- Country: United States
- State: Nebraska
- County: Butler
- Township: Ulysses

Area
  - Total: 0.22 sq mi (0.56 km^{2})
  - Land: 0.22 sq mi (0.56 km^{2})
  - Water: 0 sq mi (0.00 km^{2})
- Elevation: 1,539 ft (469 m)

Population (2020)
  - Total: 196
  - Density: 904/sq mi (349.1/km^{2})
- Time zone: UTC-6 (Central (CST))
  - Summer (DST): UTC-5 (CDT)
- ZIP codes: 68667, 68669
- Area code: 402
- FIPS code: 31-49460
- GNIS feature ID: 2400017

Ulysses is a village in Butler County, Nebraska, United States. As of the 2020 census, Ulysses had a population of 196.

== History ==
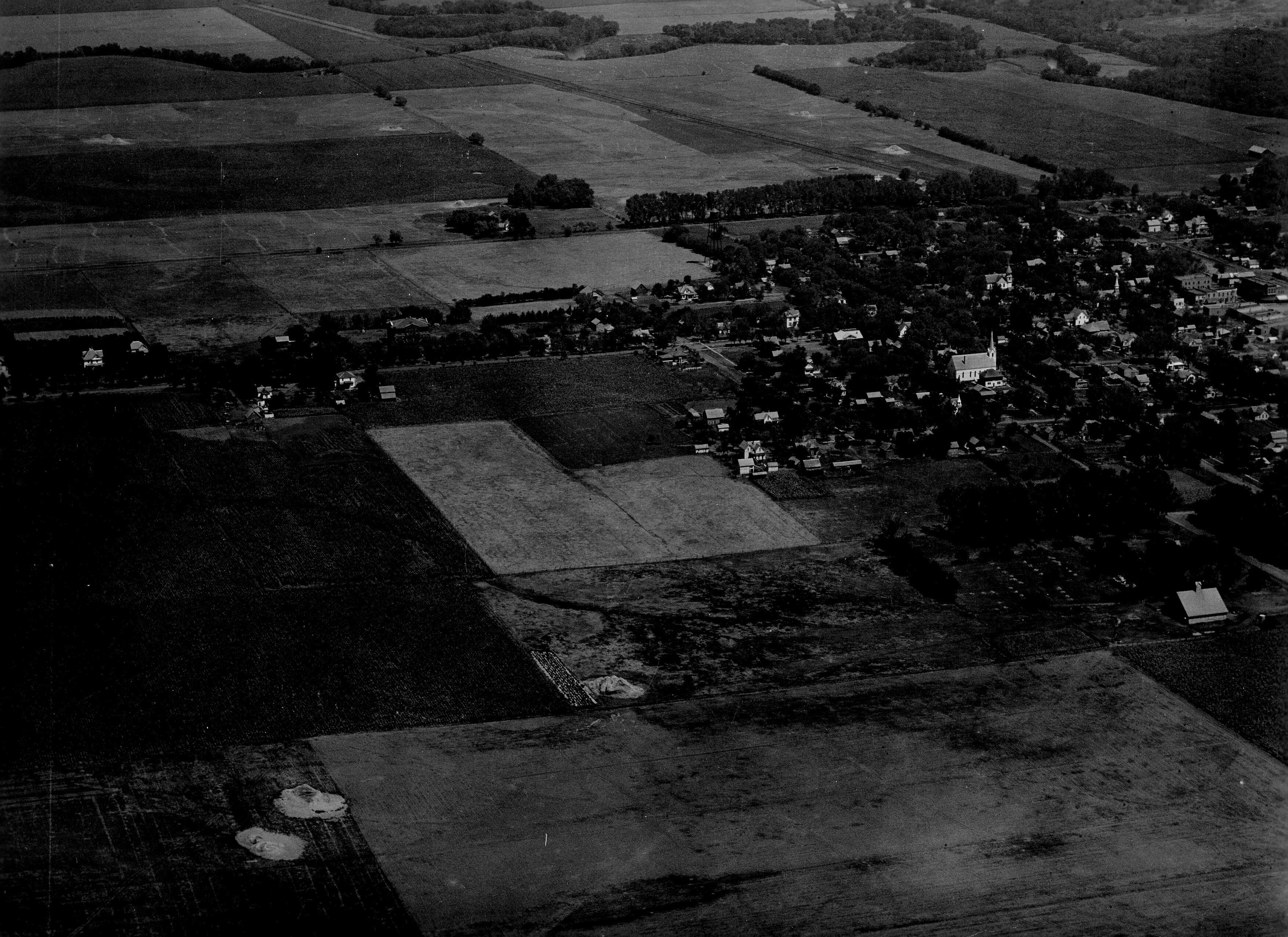
Ulysses in 1925

The first post office in Ulysses was established in 1869. The village is named for Ulysses S. Grant.

== Geography ==
According to the United States Census Bureau, the village has a total area of 0.20 square miles (0.52 km^{2}), all land.

== Demographics ==
Historical population
Census	Pop.	Note	%±
1880	305		—
1890	621		103.6%
1900	563		−9.3%
1910	551		−2.1%
1920	460		−16.5%
1930	492		7.0%
1940	429		−12.8%
1950	374		−12.8%
1960	357		−4.5%
1970	312		−12.6%
1980	270		−13.5%
1990	256		−5.2%
2000	276		7.8%
2010	171		−38.0%
2020	196		14.6%
U.S. Decennial Census

=== 2010 census ===
As of the census of 2010, there were 171 people, 74 households, and 50 families living in the village. The population density was 855.0 inhabitants per square mile (330.1/km^{2}). There were 105 housing units at an average density of 525.0 per square mile (202.7/km^{2}). The racial makeup of the village was 98.8% White and 1.2% from two or more races. Hispanic or Latino of any race were 2.3% of the population.

There were 74 households, of which 32.4% had children under the age of 18 living with them, 54.1% were married couples living together, 8.1% had a female householder with no husband present, 5.4% had a male householder with no wife present, and 32.4% were non-families. 31.1% of all households were made up of individuals, and 13.6% had someone living alone who was 65 years of age or older. The average household size was 2.31 and the average family size was 2.84.

The median age in the village was 43.8 years. 25.1% of residents were under the age of 18; 2.9% were between the ages of 18 and 24; 22.7% were from 25 to 44; 31.5% were from 45 to 64; and 17.5% were 65 years of age or older. The gender makeup of the village was 50.9% male and 49.1% female.

=== 2000 census ===
As of the census of 2000, there were 276 people, 107 households, and 78 families living in the village. The population density was 1,378.3 inhabitants per square mile (532.2/km^{2}). There were 123 housing units at an average density of 614.2 per square mile (237.1/km^{2}). The racial makeup of the village was 96.74% White, 0.36% Native American, 0.36% Asian, and 2.54% from two or more races. Hispanic or Latino of any race were 2.54% of the population.

There were 107 households, out of which 31.8% had children under the age of 18 living with them, 59.8% were married couples living together, 10.3% had a female householder with no husband present, and 27.1% were non-families. 21.5% of all households were made up of individuals, and 14.0% had someone living alone who was 65 years of age or older. The average household size was 2.58 and the average family size was 3.05.

In the village, the population was spread out, with 29.3% under the age of 18, 5.1% from 18 to 24, 30.4% from 25 to 44, 20.7% from 45 to 64, and 14.5% who were 65 years of age or older. The median age was 34 years. For every 100 females, there were 93.0 males. For every 100 females age 18 and over, there were 85.7 males.

As of 2000 the median income for a household in the village was $31,500, and the median income for a family was $39,306. Males had a median income of $27,321 versus $20,000 for females. The per capita income for the village was $14,022. About 4.9% of families and 10.5% of the population were below the poverty line, including 13.0% of those under the age of eighteen and 5.7% of those 65 or over.

== Notable people ==
- Chester Hardy Aldrich, governor of Nebraska and justice of the Nebraska Supreme Court
- William H. Diers, speaker of the Nebraska Legislature
- Ray Prochaska, NFL player and coach
- George E. Waldo, U.S. representative from New York
