= 1938 Nebraska gubernatorial election =

- November 8, 1938
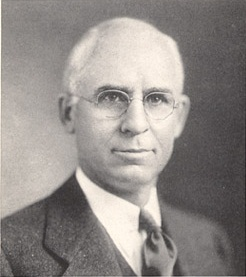

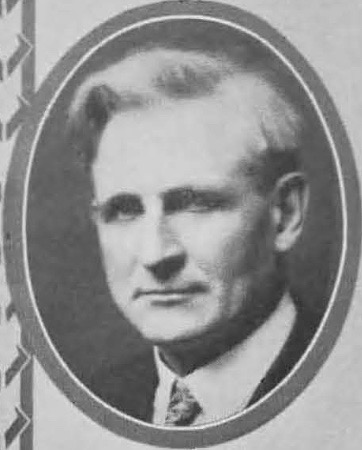

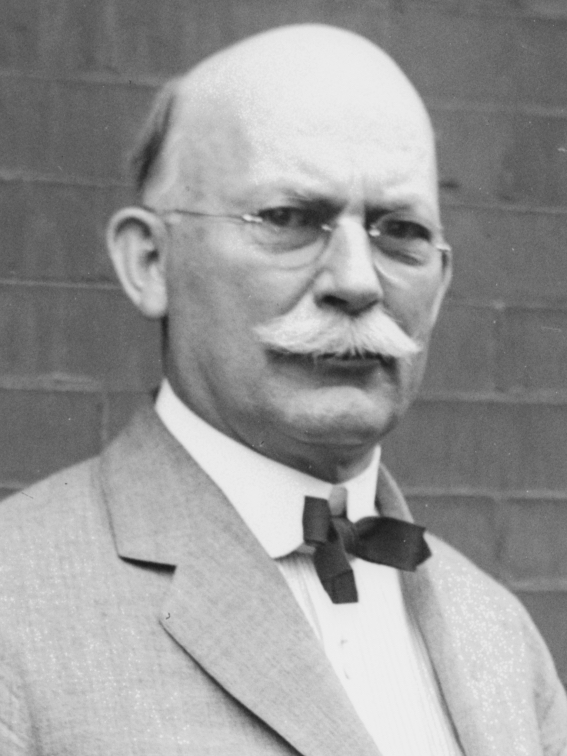
Nominee	Robert L. Cochran	Charles J. Warner	Charles W. Bryan
Party	Democratic	Republican	Independent
Popular vote	218,787	201,898	76,258
Percentage	44.03%	40.63%	15.35%
- County results Cochran: 40–50% 50–60% 60–70% 70–80% Warner: 30–40% 40–50% 50–60% 60–70%
Governor before election
Robert L. Cochran
Democratic
Elected Governor
Robert L. Cochran
Democratic

The 1938 Nebraska gubernatorial election was held on November 8, 1938, and featured incumbent Governor Robert L. Cochran, a Democrat, defeating Republican nominee, Speaker of the state legislature Charles J. Warner, as well as former Democratic Governor Charles W. Bryan, who ran as an independent, to win a third and final two-year term in office.

== Democratic primary ==
=== Candidates ===
- Fred W. Bartzatt
- Robert L. Cochran, incumbent Governor
- Samuel Freeman
- Franz C. Radke, former member of the Nebraska Legislature, Johnson County Judge, Tecumseh City Attorney, and general counsel of the state Department of Banking
- William H. Swanson

=== Results ===
Democratic primary results
Party	Candidate	Votes	%
Democratic	Robert L. Cochran (incumbent)	109,885	70.84
Democratic	William H. Swanson	15,702	10.12
Democratic	Franz C. Radke	15,426	9.94
Democratic	Samuel Freeman	10,451	6.74
Democratic	Fred W. Bartzatt	3,659	2.36

== Republican primary ==
=== Candidates ===
- Kenneth H. Gedney, architect
- Robert G. Ross
- Vernon R. Thomas
- Charles J. Warner, Speaker of the Nebraska Legislature

=== Results ===
Republican primary results
Party	Candidate	Votes	%
Republican	Charles J. Warner	70,227	55.83
Republican	Robert G. Ross	20,397	16.22
Republican	Kenneth H. Gedney	18,695	14.86
Republican	Vernon R. Thomas	16,467	13.09

== General election ==
=== Results ===
Nebraska gubernatorial election, 1938
Party	Candidate	Votes	%
Democratic	Robert L. Cochran (incumbent)	218,787	44.03%
Republican	Charles J. Warner	201,898	40.63%
Independent	Charles W. Bryan	76,258	15.35%
Total votes		496,943	100.0%
Democratic hold			

==== By County ====
By county

County	Person Democratic		Person Republican		Various candidates Other parties		Margin		Total votes
County	#	%	#	%	#	%	#	%	Total votes
Adams County									
Antelope County									
Arthur County									
Banner County									
Blaine County									
Boone County									
Box Butte County									
Boyd County									
Brown County									
Buffalo County									
Burt County									
Butler County									
Cass County									
Cedar County									
Chase County									
Cherry County									
Cheyenne County									
Clay County									
Colfax County									
Cuming County									
Custer County									
Dakota County									
Dawes County									
Dawson County									
Deuel County									
Dixon County									
Dodge County									
Douglas County									
Dundy County									
Fillmore County									
Franklin County									
Frontier County									
Furnas County									
Gage County									
Garden County									
Garfield County									
Gosper County									
Grant County									
Greeley County									
Hall County									
Hamilton County									
Hayes County									
Hitchcock County									
Holt County									
Hooker County									
Howard County									
Jefferson County									
Johnson County									
Kearney County									
Keith County									
Keya Paha County									
Kimball County									
Knox County									
Lancaster County									
Lincoln County									
Logan County									
Loup County									
Madison County									
McPherson County									
Merrick County									
Morrill County									
Nance County									
Nance County									
Nemaha County									
Nuckolls County									
Otoe County									
Pawnee County									
Perkins County									
Phelps County									
Pierce County									
Platte County									
Polk County									
Red Willow County									
Richardson County									
Rock County									
Saline County									
Sarpy County									
Saunders County									
Scotts Bluff County									
Seward County									
Sheridan County									
Sioux County									
Stanton County									
Thayer County									
Stanton County									
Thurston County									
Valley County									
Washington County									
Wayne County									
Webster County									
Wheeler County									
York County									
Totals									

== See also ==
- 1938 Nebraska lieutenant gubernatorial elections
