= 1926 Nebraska lieutenant gubernatorial election =

- November 2, 1926
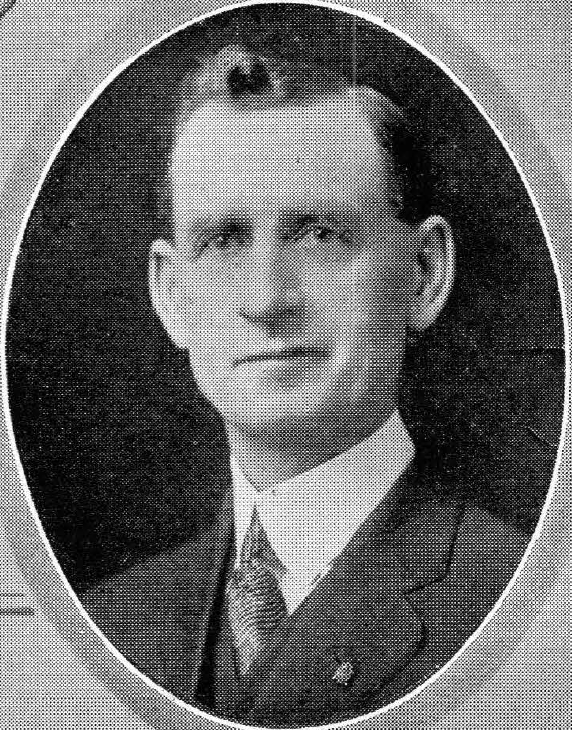

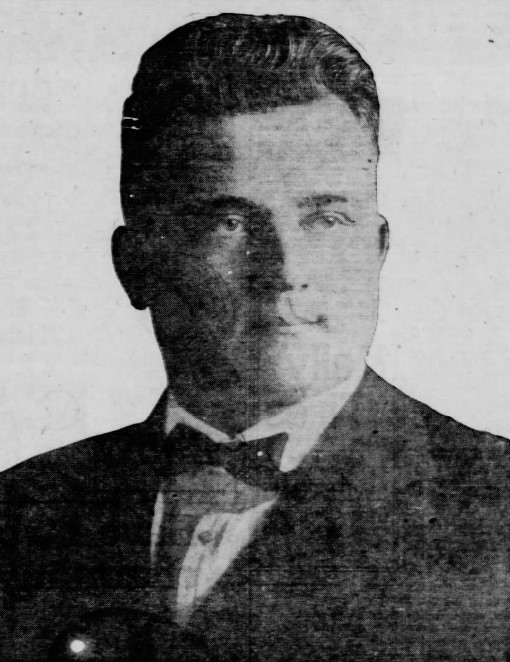
Nominee	George A. Williams	Frank A. Dutton
Party	Republican	Democratic
Popular vote	214,103	157,567
Percentage	55.8%	41.1%
Lieutenant Governor before election
George A. Williams
Republican
Elected Lieutenant Governor
George A. Williams
Republican

The 1926 Nebraska lieutenant gubernatorial election was held on November 2, 1926, and featured incumbent Nebraska Lieutenant Governor George A. Williams, a Republican, defeating Democratic nominee Frank A. Dutton as well as Progressive nominee Lloyd H. Huffman.

== Democratic primary ==
=== Candidates ===
- Will Brookley, former member of the Nebraska Senate from 1913 to 1917 from Edgar, Nebraska
- Frank A. Dutton, former city attorney of Beatrice, Nebraska
- John H. Grosvenor, attorney and former member of the Nebraska House of Representatives from 1897 to 1901 from Aurora, Nebraska
- William M. Peebler of Nelson, Nebraska

=== Results ===
Democratic primary results
Party	Candidate	Votes	%
Democratic	Frank A. Dutton	28,191	38.60
Democratic	John H. Grosvenor	20,664	28.30
Democratic	Will Brookley	13,872	19.00
Democratic	William M. Peebler	10,300	14.10

== Republican primary ==
=== Candidates ===
Alice A. Holtman of Omaha, Nebraska, was nominated to run for the Republican nomination by petition, but she did not accept it.

- Rev. Walter C. Rundin of Mitchell, Nebraska, former president of the Nebraska Association of Volunteer Firemen
- B. F. Thomas, attorney, former member of the Nebraska Senate from 1905 to 1909, and former postmaster of Omaha, Nebraska, from 1908 to 1913
- George A. Williams, incumbent Nebraska Lieutenant Governor

=== Results ===
Republican primary results
Party	Candidate	Votes	%
Republican	George A. Williams (incumbent)	67,372	50.19
Republican	B. F. Thomas	39,612	29.51
Republican	Walter C. Rundin	27,244	20.30

== General election ==
=== Results ===
Nebraska lieutenant gubernatorial election, 1926
Party	Candidate	Votes	%
Republican	George A. Williams (incumbent)	214,103	55.77
Democratic	Frank A. Dutton	157,567	41.05
Progressive Party (United States, 1924)	Lloyd H. Huffman	12,214	3.18
Total votes		383,884	100.00
Republican hold			

== See also ==
- 1926 Nebraska gubernatorial election
