= Ray Prochaska =

American football player and coach (1919–1997)

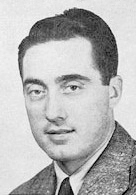
- Prochaska, circa 1946

No. 8
- Position: End

Personal information
- Born: September 8, 1919; Ulysses, Nebraska, U.S.
- Died: March 9, 1997 (aged 77); Orange County, California, U.S.
- Listed height: 6 ft 3 in (1.91 m)
- Listed weight: 200 lb (91 kg)

Career information
- High school: Ulysses
- College: Nebraska (1937–1940)
- NFL draft: 1941: 7th round, 54th overall pick

Career history

Playing
- Cleveland Rams (1941)

Coaching
- Nebraska (1947–1948, 1950–1954) Assistant coach; Edmonton Eskimos (1955–1957) Assistant coach; St. Louis Cardinals (1958–1961) Offensive line coach; St. Louis Cardinals (1961) Interim head coach; St. Louis Cardinals (1962–1965) Offensive line coach; Los Angeles Rams (1966–1970) Offensive line coach; Cleveland Browns (1971–1972) Offensive line coach; Los Angeles Rams (1973–1976) Offensive line coach; Los Angeles Rams (1977) Offensive coordinator; Buffalo Bills (1978–1982) Offensive coordinator; Seattle Seahawks (1983–1985) Offensive coordinator/offensive line coach

Awards and highlights
- First-team All-Big Six (1940)

Career NFL statistics
- Receptions: 4
- Receiving yards: 29
- Stats at Pro Football Reference

Head coaching record
- Regular season: 2–0–0 (1.000)
- Coaching profile at Pro Football Reference

Raymond Edward Prochaska (/proʊˈhæskə/ proh-HAS-kə; August 9, 1919 – March 9, 1997) was an American gridiron football player and coach. He attended the University of Nebraska and played one season in the National Football League (NFL).

== Biography ==
Ray Prochaska was born in Ulysses, Nebraska, to Emil Prochaska and Marie Fredlick, having Czech and Moravian ancestry. He attended high school in Ulysses before enrolling at the University of Nebraska, where he played college football. Prochaska helped take the Cornhuskers to the 1941 Rose Bowl, where they were defeated by the Stanford Indians, 21 to 13.

Prochaska was drafted by and made his professional debut in the National Football League in 1941 with the Cleveland Rams before leaving football for military service during World War II. He served from 1942 to 1946 in the US Army and held the rank of captain when discharged.

After leaving the military he joined the coaching staff at his alma mater, where he was assistant coach in charge of ends. In May 1955 he moved to the professional ranks, joining the staff of head coach Pop Ivy of the Edmonton Eskimos of the Canadian Football League (CFL). When Ivy was named head coach of the Chicago Cardinals in 1958, Prochaska turned down an offer to take over as head coach of the Eskimos and followed his mentor to the NFL, joining him as an assistant coach on his staff.

After Ivy resigned as coach of the Cards late in the 1961 season, Prochaska joined fellow assistant coaches Chuck Drulis and Ray Willsey in sharing head coaching duties on an interim basis. The trio finished the year with a 2–0 record.

Prochaska went on to be an NFL assistant coach for a number of NFL teams, often serving under Chuck Knox, including the Los Angeles Rams, Buffalo Bills, and Seattle Seahawks.

Ray Prochaska died March 9, 1997, in Orange County, California. He was 77 years old at the time of his death.
