= 1954 Nebraska lieutenant gubernatorial election =

- November 2, 1954
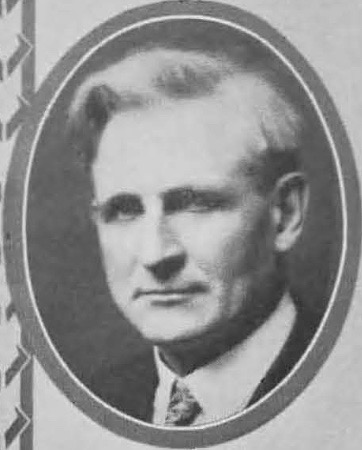

Nominee	Charles J. Warner	Stanley D. Long
Party	Republican	Democratic
Popular vote	250,377	148,569
Percentage	62.8%	37.2%
Lieutenant Governor before election
Charles J. Warner
Republican
Elected Lieutenant Governor
Charles J. Warner
Republican

The 1954 Nebraska lieutenant gubernatorial election was held on November 2, 1954, and featured incumbent Nebraska Lieutenant Governor Charles J. Warner, a Republican, defeating Democratic nominee Stanley D. Long, a former member of the University of Nebraska Board of Regents, to win his fourth term as lieutenant governor.

About a month shy of a year after this election, Charles J. Warner died on September 24, 1955, and thus the office of Nebraska Lieutenant Governor became vacant for over a year until it was filled in the 1956 election.

== Democratic primary ==
=== Candidates ===
Stanley D. Long ran unopposed in the Democratic primary. He was a realtor and pharmacist who served from 1927 to 1951 on the University of Nebraska Board of Regents. He was also the former mayor of Cowles, Nebraska, and was an unsuccessful Democratic nominee for United States Senate in 1952.

=== Results ===
Democratic primary results
Party	Candidate	Votes	%
Democratic	Stanley D. Long	59,370	99.98
Scattering		9	

== Republican primary ==
=== Candidates ===
- A. P. Hanna
- C. A. Huck
- Charles J. Warner, incumbent Nebraska Lieutenant Governor

=== Results ===
Republican primary results
Party	Candidate	Votes	%
Republican	Charles J. Warner (incumbent)	101,738	74.98
Republican	A. P. Hanna	23,803	17.54
Republican	C. A. Huck	10,130	7.47
Scattering		8	

== General election ==
=== Results ===
Nebraska lieutenant gubernatorial election, 1954
Party	Candidate	Votes	%
Republican	Charles J. Warner (incumbent)	250,377	62.76
Democratic	Stanley D. Long	148,569	37.24
Total votes		398,946	100.00
Republican hold			

== See also ==
- 1954 Nebraska gubernatorial election
