= William E. Johnson (Nebraska politician) =

American politician

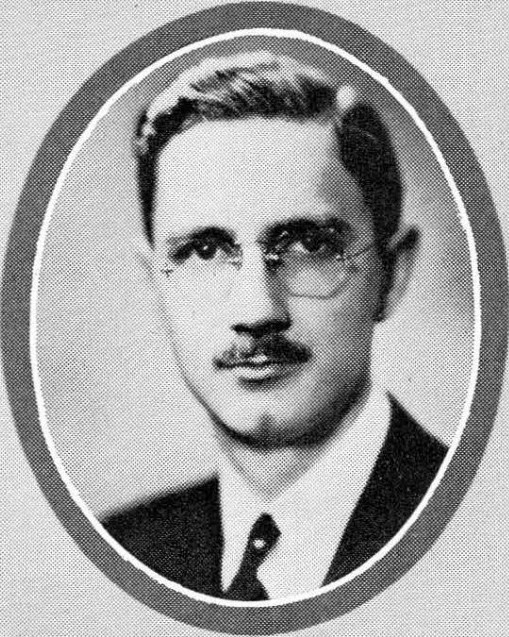

22nd Lieutenant Governor of Nebraska
- In office January 5, 1939 – January 7, 1943
- Governor: Roy Cochran; Dwight Griswold
- Preceded by: Nate M. Parsons
- Succeeded by: Roy W. Johnson

Personal details
- Born: June 28, 1906 Omaha, Nebraska, US
- Died: September 18, 1976 (aged 70)
- Party: Republican
- Spouse: Jeroma Johnson
- Children: 4
- Profession: Accountant

William Edward Johnson (June 28, 1906 – September 18, 1976) served as the 22nd lieutenant governor of Nebraska, from 1939 to 1943. He was a Republican who initially served under Democratic governor Roy Cochran and later under governor Dwight Griswold, who was also a Republican. He was born in and died in Omaha.

Johnson was an accountant and writer of economic articles for financial journals from Schuyler, Nebraska. He first entered politics in the election of 1938 by filing to run for Nebraska Lieutenant Governor. He won the Republican nomination in a field of seven candidates and then went on to win the general election over former US Representative Terry Carpenter. Johnson was reelected as lieutenant governor in the 1940 election.

In 1942, Johnson decided not to run for reelection as lieutenant governor in order to run for United States House of Representatives in Nebraska's First District. He lost to Republican Carl Curtis in the Republican primaries. In 1946, when Nebraska Governor Dwight P. Griswold decided not to seek reelection as governor, Johnson, who served under Griswold, ran for governor but also lost in the Republican primaries to Val Peterson.

Johnson was reportedly a descendant of Nebraska Governor James E. Boyd.
