= Lieutenant Governor of Nebraska =

Government official in the United States

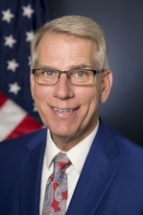
- Incumbent; Joe Kelly since January 5, 2023
- Type: Lieutenant governor
- Term length: Four years, no term limits
- Formation: 1877
- First holder: Othman A. Abbott
- Succession: First
- Website: https://ltgov.nebraska.gov

The lieutenant governor of Nebraska is the highest-ranking executive official in the state of Nebraska after the governor. According to the Nebraska State Constitution, in the event a governor dies, becomes permanently incapacitated, resigns, or is removed from office, the lieutenant governor will become governor.

Prior to the Constitution of 1875, Nebraska had no office of lieutenant governor. If the governor died, resigned, or was removed from office (as happened to Governor David Butler in 1871), then the Nebraska Secretary of State was appointed as acting governor until the vacancy would be filled by the next election. The Constitution of 1875 created the office of Lieutenant Governor of Nebraska, leading to the first election of a lieutenant governor in Nebraska in the election of 1876.

Prior to 1962, both the governor and the lieutenant governor were elected to two-year terms, but in 1962, voters approved a constitutional amendment providing that the governor and lieutenant governor would be elected to four-year terms beginning in 1966. However, prior to 1974, the governor and the lieutenant governor ran independently and were elected on separate tickets in the general election, which is why sometimes Nebraska had a governor from one party but a lieutenant governor from another. Starting in 1974, due to a constitutional amendment, the process was changed such that the governor and lieutenant governor candidates would secure their nominations independently in the primary elections in their respective parties, but then they ran together in the general election on one ticket from the same political party. Finally, by 2002, the constitution was again amended to allow gubernatorial candidates to choose their nominee for lieutenant governor after winning their respective parties’ primary elections, which means that the lieutenant governor is no longer elected independently of the governor at any stage.

By law, the lieutenant governor presides over the Nebraska Legislature, acts as governor when the governor is out of the state or is incapacitated, and performs other duties assigned to him or her by the governor. Nebraska's lieutenant governor also serves as the director of homeland security for the state and as the chairman of the Governor's Homeland Security Policy Group. Before 1971, the office of lieutenant governor was considered a part-time position except during the biennial legislative session. When the Legislature began meeting annually, the office of lieutenant governor became a full-time position.

== Legislative role ==
As the highest-ranking presiding officer of the Nebraska Legislature, the lieutenant governor is known officially as the president of the Legislature. When presiding, the lieutenant governor may vote to break a tie in the Legislature on any matter except when the vote is on the final passage of a bill. The lieutenant governor, in the role of presiding officer, also signs all bills and resolutions passed by the Legislature. In the absence of the lieutenant governor, the speaker presides over legislative sessions.

== List ==
Parties

Republican (32 + 1 Acting) Democratic (9 + 1 Acting) Fusion (Democratic/Populist) (2)

#	Image	Lieutenant Governor	Term	Governor(s) Served Under	Election(s)	Party
1		Othman A. Abbott	1877–1879	Silas Garber	1876	Republican
2		Edmund C. Carns	1879–1883	Albinus Nance	1878	Republican
2		Edmund C. Carns	1879–1883	Albinus Nance	1880	Republican
3		Alfred W. Agee	1883–1885	James W. Dawes	1882	Republican
4		Hibbard H. Shedd	1885–1889	James W. Dawes	1884	Republican
4		Hibbard H. Shedd	1885–1889	John Milton Thayer	1886	Republican
5		George D. Meiklejohn	1889–1891	John Milton Thayer	1888	Republican
6		Thomas J. Majors	1891–1895	James E. Boyd	1890	Republican
6		Thomas J. Majors	1891–1895	John Milton Thayer	Governorship; Disputed	Republican
6		Thomas J. Majors	1891–1895	James E. Boyd	Governorship; Disputed	Republican
6		Thomas J. Majors	1891–1895	Lorenzo Crounse	1892	Republican
7		Robert E. Moore	1895–1897	Silas A. Holcomb	1894	Republican
8		James E. Harris	1897–1899	Silas A. Holcomb	1896	Fusion (Democratic/Populist)
9		Edward A. Gilbert	1899–1901	William A. Poynter	1898	Fusion (Democratic/Populist)
10		Ezra P. Savage (Note: On May 1, 1901, after serving only four months as Governor of Nebraska, Charles H. Dietrich resigned from being governor as he had been elected by the Nebraska Legislature to fill the vacant U.S. Senate term of Monroe L. Hayward, who had died. Thus, Ezra P. Savage became the Governor of Nebraska and the office of Lieutenant Governor was vacant until after the election of Edmund G. McGilton in 1902.)	1901	Charles H. Dietrich	1900	Republican
–		Calvin F. Steele (Acting) (Note: Although Calvin F. Steele is not listed in recent editions of the Nebraska Blue Book as having served as Lieutenant Governor, multiple sources from the time indicate that after the elevation of Ezra P. Savage to Governor, Steele was considered the acting lieutenant governor due to his position as president pro tempore of the Nebraska Senate based on a misinterpretation of Article V, Section 18, of the Nebraska Constitution. (Article V, Section 18, of the Nebraska constitution at the time provided that "If there be no lieutenant governor..., the president [pro tempore] of the senate shall act as governor until the vacancy is filled, or the disability removed...." This would only take effect if the office of Governor of Nebraska was vacant and there was no Lieutenant Governor then in office to fill it. It should not have been applied to the case where only the office of lieutenant governor was vacant.) Thus, in the 1915 Nebraska Blue Book and the 1918 Nebraska Blue Book, Calvin F. Steele is listed as having served as Lieutenant Governor, even replacing any mention of Ezra P. Savage's brief stint as Lieutenant Governor. Steele is also called the "former Lieutenant Governor" in a local newspaper account. However, by 1920, Steele along with Morehead was not being included in the list of lieutenant governors of Nebraska in the Nebraska Blue Book though some later editions of the Blue Book specifically noted in the list of lieutenant governors that Steele was the president pro tempore of the Nebraska Senate during the time that the lieutenant governor's office was vacant.)	1901–1903	Ezra P. Savage	Acting	Republican
11		Edmund G. McGilton	1903–1907	John H. Mickey	1902	Republican
11		Edmund G. McGilton	1903–1907	John H. Mickey	1904	Republican
12		Melville R. Hopewell (Note: On May 2, 1911, Melville Hopewell died while in office, which left the office of Lieutenant Governor vacant until it was filled by the subsequent election of Samuel R. McKelvie.)	1907–1911	George L. Sheldon	1906	Republican
12		Melville R. Hopewell	1907–1911	Ashton C. Shallenberger	1908	Republican
12		Melville R. Hopewell	1907–1911	Chester H. Aldrich	1910	Republican
–		John H. Morehead (Acting) (Note: Although John H. Morehead is not listed in recent editions of the Nebraska Blue Book as having served as Lieutenant Governor, multiple sources from the time indicate that after the death of Melville R. Hopewell, Morehead was considered the acting lieutenant governor due to his position as president pro tempore of the Nebraska Senate based on a misinterpretation of Article V, Section 18, of the Nebraska Constitution. (See the note under Calvin F. Steele.) Thus, in the 1915 Nebraska Blue Book and the 1918 Nebraska Blue Book, John H. Morehead is listed as having served as Lieutenant Governor. It is also said in a local newspaper account from the time that Morehead "became acting Lieutenant Governor of the state" and other newspaper accounts from the time referred to him as the "lieutenant governor" or "acting lieutenant governor." However, as soon as 1920, he was not being included in the list of lieutenant governors of Nebraska in the Nebraska Blue Book though some later editions of the Blue Book specifically noted in the list of lieutenant governors that Morehead was the President pro tempore of the Nebraska Senate during the time that the lieutenant governor's office was vacant.)	1911–1913	Chester H. Aldrich	Acting	Democratic
13		Samuel R. McKelvie	1913–1915	John H. Morehead	1912	Republican
14		James Pearson	1915–1917	John H. Morehead	1914	Democratic
15		Edgar Howard	1917–1919	Keith Neville	1916	Democratic
16		Pelham A. Barrows	1919–1923	Samuel R. McKelvie	1918	Republican
16		Pelham A. Barrows	1919–1923	Samuel R. McKelvie	1920	Republican
17		Fred G. Johnson	1923–1925	Charles W. Bryan	1922	Republican
18		George A. Williams	1925–1931	Adam McMullen	1924	Republican
18		George A. Williams	1925–1931	Adam McMullen	1926	Republican
18		George A. Williams	1925–1931	Arthur J. Weaver	1928	Republican
19		Theodore W. Metcalfe	1931–1933	Charles W. Bryan	1930	Republican
20		Walter H. Jurgensen (Note: Walter H. Jurgensen was removed from office in June 1938 after being convicted in March 1938 of embezzling $549 in a stock transaction between a co-defendant and a railroad station agent in September 1934. Jurgensen contested the conviction and sought renomination for a fourth term as lieutenant governor, but he was declared ineligible to participate in the primary.)	1933–1938	Charles W. Bryan	1932	Democratic
20		Walter H. Jurgensen	1933–1938	Robert Leroy Cochran	1934	Democratic
20		Walter H. Jurgensen	1933–1938	Robert Leroy Cochran	1936	Democratic
21		Nate M. Parsons (Note: Nate M. Parsons was elected in a special election to fill out the remainder of the term of Walter H. Jurgensen, who was removed from office. He served in office from Nov. 8, 1938, to Jan. 5, 1939.)	1938–1939	Robert Leroy Cochran	1938 (special)	Democratic
22		William E. Johnson	1939–1943	Robert Leroy Cochran	1938	Republican
22		William E. Johnson	1939–1943	Dwight Griswold	1940	Republican
23		Roy W. Johnson	1943–1947	Dwight Griswold	1942	Republican
23		Roy W. Johnson	1943–1947	Dwight Griswold	1944	Republican
24		Robert B. Crosby	1947–1949	Val Peterson	1946	Republican
25		Charles J. Warner (Note: On Sept. 24, 1955, Charles J. Warner died while in office, which left the office of Lieutenant Governor vacant until it was filled by the subsequent election of Dwight Burney.)	1949–1955	Val Peterson	1948	Republican
25		Charles J. Warner	1949–1955	Val Peterson	1950	Republican
25		Charles J. Warner	1949–1955	Robert B. Crosby	1952	Republican
25		Charles J. Warner	1949–1955	Victor Anderson	1954	Republican
26		Dwight Burney	1957–1965	Victor Anderson	1956	Republican
26		Dwight Burney	1957–1965	Ralph G. Brooks	1958	Republican
26		Dwight Burney	1957–1965	Became Governor (Note: On Sept. 9, 1960, Governor Ralph G. Brooks died in office, which caused Dwight Burney to become the Governor of Nebraska. He served out the remaining four months of Brooks' term and was subsequently reelected to the office of Lieutenant Governor in 1960.)		Republican
26		Dwight Burney	1957–1965	Frank B. Morrison	1960	Republican
26		Dwight Burney	1957–1965	Frank B. Morrison	1962	Republican
27		Philip Sorensen	1965–1967	Frank B. Morrison	1964	Democratic
28		John Everroad	1967–1971	Norbert Tiemann	1966	Republican
29		Frank Marsh	1971–1975	James Exon	1970	Republican
30		Gerald Whelan	1975–1979	James Exon	1974	Democratic
31		Roland Luedtke	1979–1983	Charles Thone	1978	Republican
32		Donald McGinley	1983–1987	Bob Kerrey	1982	Democratic
33		William E. Nichol	1987–1991	Kay Orr	1986	Republican
34		Maxine Moul (Note: Maxine B. Moul resigned in 1993 to become the director of the Nebraska Department of Economic Development.)	1991–1993	Ben Nelson	1990	Democratic
35		Kim Robak (Note: Kim Robak was appointed by Governor Ben Nelson on Oct. 6, 1993, to complete the term of Maxine B. Moul, who had resigned. She was subsequently elected to the office in 1994.)	1993–1999	Ben Nelson	Appointed	Democratic
35		Kim Robak	1993–1999	Ben Nelson	1994	Democratic
36		David Maurstad (Note: David Maurstad resigned in 2001 to become the director of the Federal Emergency Management Agency, Region VIII.)	1999–2001	Mike Johanns	1998	Republican
37		Dave Heineman (Note: Dave Heineman was appointed by Governor Mike Johanns on Oct. 1, 2001, to complete the term of David Maurstad, who had resigned. He was subsequently elected to the office in 2002.)	2001–2005 (Note: Dave Heineman became the governor on January 20, 2005, following Governor Mike Johanns's resignation to become United States Secretary of Agriculture in President George W. Bush's administration.)	Mike Johanns	Appointed	Republican
37		Dave Heineman	2001–2005	Mike Johanns	2002	Republican
38		Rick Sheehy (Note: Rick Sheehy was appointed by Governor Dave Heineman on Jan. 24, 2005, to finish his own term since he had become Governor. Rick Sheehy was subsequently elected to the office in 2006.)	2005–2013 (Note: Rick Sheehy resigned on Feb. 2, 2013, with a two-sentence resignation letter, after it was reported that he had been using his state-issued cell phone for years to make 2,000 late-night telephone calls to four different women who were not his wife.)	Dave Heineman	Appointed	Republican
38		Rick Sheehy	2005–2013	Dave Heineman	2006	Republican
38		Rick Sheehy	2005–2013	Dave Heineman	2010	Republican
39		Lavon Heidemann (Note: Lavon Heidemann was appointed by Governor Dave Heineman on Feb. 13, 2013, to finish the term of Rick Sheehy, who had resigned.)	2013–2014 (Note: Lavon Heidemann resigned on Sept. 9, 2014, after his sister obtained a restraining order against him, alleging that he had physically assaulted her in the course of a dispute over the care of their elderly mother. Heidemann had been chosen by then-candidate for Governor Pete Ricketts as his running mate for Lieutenant Governor, but he withdrew from the Ricketts ticket in light of his resignation.)	Dave Heineman	Appointed	Republican
40		John E. Nelson (Note: John E. Nelson was appointed by Governor Dave Heineman on Sept. 29, 2014, to finish the term of Lavon Heidemann, who had resigned.)	2014–2015	Dave Heineman	Appointed	Republican
41		Mike Foley	2015–2023	Pete Ricketts	2014	Republican
41		Mike Foley	2015–2023	Pete Ricketts	2018	Republican
42		Joe Kelly	2023–present	Jim Pillen	2022	Republican

== See also ==
- List of governors of Nebraska
