= 1932 Nebraska lieutenant gubernatorial election =

- November 8, 1932

| Nominee | Walter H. Jurgensen | Theodore W. Metcalfe |
| Party | Democratic | Republican |
| Popular vote | 280,657 | 245,756 |
| Percentage | 52.2% | 45.7% |
Lieutenant Governor before election
Theodore W. Metcalfe
Republican
Elected Lieutenant Governor
Walter H. Jurgensen
Democratic

The 1932 Nebraska lieutenant gubernatorial election was held on November 8, 1932, and featured Democratic nominee Walter H. Jurgensen defeating the incumbent Nebraska Lieutenant Governor, Republican Theodore W. Metcalfe, as part of a Democratic landslide in the state connected to Franklin D. Roosevelt's election as president.

== Democratic primary ==
=== Candidates ===
- Charles F. Beushausen, former member of the Nebraska House of Representatives from 1923 to 1925 from Loup City, Nebraska
- Walter H. Jurgensen, president of the Western Union Life Insurance Company and former unsuccessful Republican candidate for Nebraska Senate challenging Charles J. Warner in 1928 from Lincoln, Nebraska
- Bennie Nelson, from Anoka, Nebraska
- William F. Porter, former Nebraska Secretary of State from 1897 to 1901 and member of the Nebraska Senate from 1891 to 1895
- Henry F. Schepman, member of the Nebraska Senate since 1929 and former member of the Nebraska House of Representatives from 1925 to 1927 from Falls City, Nebraska
- Rudolph E. Watzke, merchant from Humboldt, Nebraska

=== Results ===
Democratic primary results
| Party | Candidate | Votes | % |
|---|---|---|---|
| Democratic | Walter H. Jurgensen | 32,588 | 28.07 |
| Democratic | William F. Porter | 30,286 | 26.09 |
| Democratic | Bennie Nelson | 16,819 | 14.49 |
| Democratic | Henry F. Schepman | 16,030 | 13.81 |
| Democratic | Charles F. Beushausen | 12,743 | 10.98 |
| Democratic | Rudolph E. Watzke | 7,610 | 6.56 |

== Republican primary ==
=== Candidates ===
- James Otto Martin, from Farnam, Nebraska
- Theodore W. Metcalfe, incumbent Nebraska Lieutenant Governor
- Alfred E. Reeves, from Farnam, Nebraska

=== Results ===
Republican primary results
| Party | Candidate | Votes | % |
|---|---|---|---|
| Republican | Theodore W. Metcalfe (incumbent) | 62,685 | 62.66 |
| Republican | Alfred E. Reeves | 19,494 | 19.49 |
| Republican | James O. Martin | 17,854 | 17.85 |

== General election ==
=== Results ===
Nebraska lieutenant gubernatorial election, 1932
| Party | Candidate | Votes | % |
|---|---|---|---|
| Democratic | Walter H. Jurgensen | 280,657 | 52.23 |
| Republican | Theodore W. Metcalfe (incumbent) | 245,756 | 45.73 |
| Socialist | C. H. Wilson | 10,945 | 2.04 |
| Total votes | | 537,358 | 100.00 |
| Democratic gain from Republican | | | |

== See also ==
- 1932 Nebraska gubernatorial election
