= 1934 Nebraska gubernatorial election =

- November 6, 1934
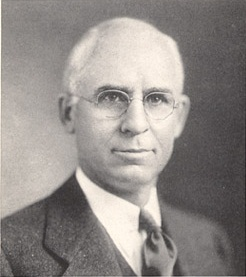

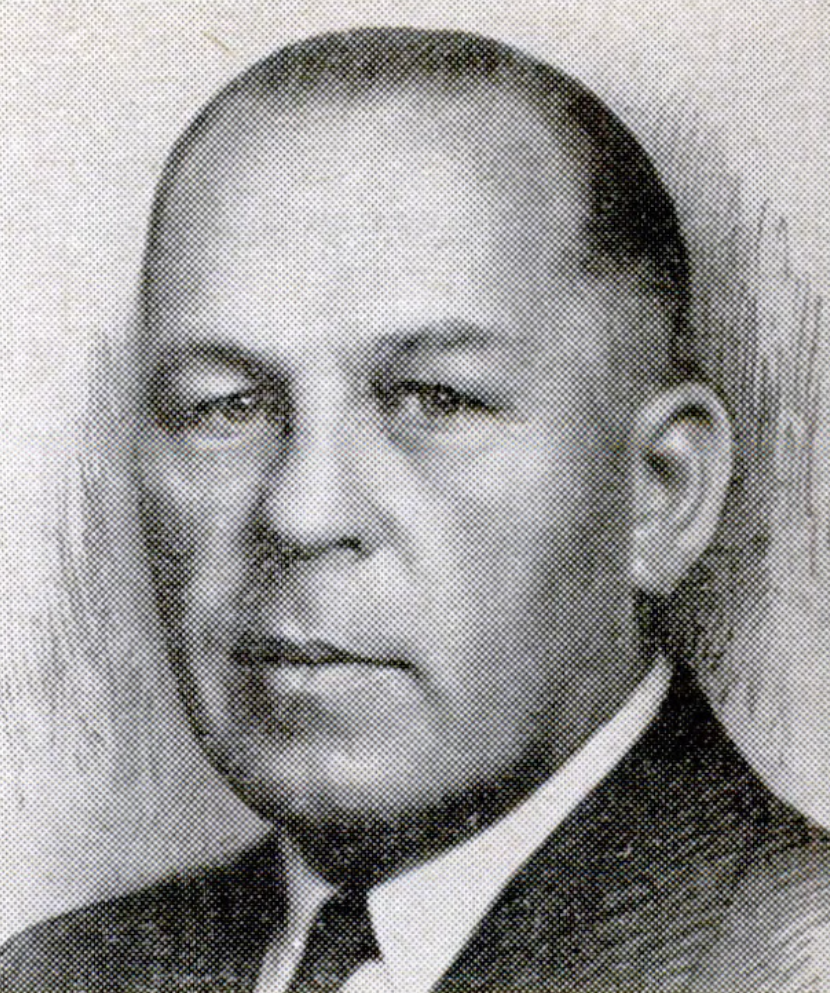
Nominee	Robert L. Cochran	Dwight Griswold
Party	Democratic	Republican
Popular vote	284,095	266,707
Percentage	50.84%	47.73%
- County results Cochran: 40–50% 50–60% 60–70% Griswold: 40–50% 50–60% 60–70%
Governor before election
Charles W. Bryan
Democratic
Elected Governor
Robert L. Cochran
Democratic

The 1934 Nebraska gubernatorial election was held on November 6, 1934, and featured state engineer Robert L. Cochran, a Democrat, defeating Republican nominee, newspaper publisher and former state legislator Dwight Griswold.

== Democratic primary ==
=== Candidates ===
- William B. Banning, former member of the Nebraska Senate
- Terry Carpenter, U.S. Representative
- Robert L. Cochran, state engineer
- Frank J. Klopping, member of the Nebraska House of Representatives
- Maud Edgerton Nuquist, secretary-treasurer of the director's council of the General Federation of Women's Clubs
- Eugene D. O'Sullivan, attorney
- William F. Porter, former Nebraska Secretary of State from 1897 to 1901 and candidate for the Democratic nomination for lieutenant governor in 1932
- John F. Rohn, Mayor of Fremont
- J. G. Stroble

=== Results ===
Democratic primary results
Party	Candidate	Votes	%
Democratic	Robert L. Cochran	56,961	28.79
Democratic	Terry Carpenter	44,024	22.25
Democratic	Eugene D. O'Sullivan	41,058	20.75
Democratic	John F. Rohn	22,762	11.50
Democratic	William B. Banning	16,039	8.11
Democratic	Maud Edgerton Nuquist	7,018	3.55
Democratic	William F. Porter	3,755	1.90
Democratic	Frank J. Klopping	3,440	1.74
Democratic	J. G. Stroble	2,784	1.41
Democratic	Write-in	13	0.01

== Republican primary ==
=== Candidates ===
- George B. Clark
- Dwight Griswold, newspaper publisher, former member of the Nebraska Legislature, and candidate for governor in 1932.
- Theodore W. Metcalfe, former Lieutenant Governor
- Christian A. Sorensen, former Attorney General
- George W. Sterling

=== Results ===
Republican primary results
Party	Candidate	Votes	%
Republican	Dwight Griswold	94,781	52.75
Republican	Christian A. Sorensen	42,200	23.48
Republican	Theodore W. Metcalfe	36,037	20.06
Republican	George B. Clark	3,954	2.20
Republican	George W. Sterling	2,701	1.50
Republican	Write-in	17	0.01

== General election ==
=== Results ===
Nebraska gubernatorial election, 1934
Party	Candidate	Votes	%
Democratic	Robert L. Cochran	284,095	50.84%
Republican	Dwight Griswold	266,707	47.73%
Independent	Ralph W. Madison	4,630	0.83%
Independent	John J. Schefcik	3,362	0.60%
Write-in	Others	7	>0.01%
Total votes		558,801	100.0%
Democratic hold			

==== By County ====
By county

County	Person Democratic		Person Republican		Various candidates Other parties		Margin		Total votes
County	#	%	#	%	#	%	#	%	Total votes
Adams County									
Antelope County									
Arthur County									
Banner County									
Blaine County									
Boone County									
Box Butte County									
Boyd County									
Brown County									
Buffalo County									
Burt County									
Butler County									
Cass County									
Cedar County									
Chase County									
Cherry County									
Cheyenne County									
Clay County									
Colfax County									
Cuming County									
Custer County									
Dakota County									
Dawes County									
Dawson County									
Deuel County									
Dixon County									
Dodge County									
Douglas County									
Dundy County									
Fillmore County									
Franklin County									
Frontier County									
Furnas County									
Gage County									
Garden County									
Garfield County									
Gosper County									
Grant County									
Greeley County									
Hall County									
Hamilton County									
Hayes County									
Hitchcock County									
Holt County									
Hooker County									
Howard County									
Jefferson County									
Johnson County									
Kearney County									
Keith County									
Keya Paha County									
Kimball County									
Knox County									
Lancaster County									
Lincoln County									
Logan County									
Loup County									
Madison County									
McPherson County									
Merrick County									
Morrill County									
Nance County									
Nance County									
Nemaha County									
Nuckolls County									
Otoe County									
Pawnee County									
Perkins County									
Phelps County									
Pierce County									
Platte County									
Polk County									
Red Willow County									
Richardson County									
Rock County									
Saline County									
Sarpy County									
Saunders County									
Scotts Bluff County									
Seward County									
Sheridan County									
Sioux County									
Stanton County									
Thayer County									
Stanton County									
Thurston County									
Valley County									
Washington County									
Wayne County									
Webster County									
Wheeler County									
York County									
Totals									

== See also ==
- 1934 Nebraska lieutenant gubernatorial election
