= Ulysses Township, Butler County, Nebraska =

Ulysses Township
- Township
- Location in Butler County
- Coordinates: 41°05′29″N 097°12′00″W
- Country: United States
- State: Nebraska
- County: Butler

Area
  - Total: 36.29 sq mi (93.99 km^{2})
  - Land: 36.29 sq mi (93.99 km^{2})
  - Water: 0 sq mi (0 km^{2}) 0%
- Elevation: 1,510 ft (460 m)

Population (2020)
  - Total: 315
  - Density: 8.68/sq mi (3.35/km^{2})
- GNIS feature ID: 0838295

Ulysses Township is one of seventeen townships in Butler County, Nebraska, United States. The population was 315 at the 2020 census. A 2021 estimate placed the township's population at 318.

The Village of Ulysses lies within the Township.

== See also ==
- County government in Nebraska
