= Nate M. Parsons =

American politician (1888–1945)

Nathan Marcellus Parsons

21st Lieutenant Governor of Nebraska
- In office November 8, 1938 – January 5, 1939
- Governor: Roy Cochran
- Preceded by: Walter H. Jurgensen
- Succeeded by: William E. Johnson

Personal details
- Born: March 15, 1888 York County, Nebraska
- Died: October 17, 1945 (aged 57) Lincoln, Nebraska
- Occupation: Pharmacist, Politician

Nathan Marcellus Parsons (March 15, 1888 in York County, Nebraska – October 17, 1945 in Lincoln, Nebraska) was an American pharmacist and politician. A Democrat, he was elected to a very brief term as the 21st lieutenant governor of Nebraska - about two months in late 1938 and early 1939.

== Career ==
Parsons in 1938

Parsons' father Isaac Newton Parsons (1849-1920) came to Nebraska from Ohio, settling in York County. Parsons graduated from Lincoln High School in 1907 and then studied pharmacy. After 1912 he worked as a salesman for several companies.

In 1934 he worked on publicity and speaking for the Democratic campaigns of Roy Cochran and Edward R. Burke for governor and senator. From 1935 to 1937 he served as the assistant state director of old age assistance. He was the Lancaster County campaign manager for Senator George W. Norris's Independent campaign in 1936. In 1937 he opened the Parsons Drug Store in Lincoln. After Walter H. Jurgensen was convicted of embezzlement in 1938, Parsons was elected to fill out the remainder of Jurgensen's term, which amounted to less than two months: November 8, 1938 to January 5, 1939. He presided over the first two days of the legislative term and was later officially voted thanks "for the impartial manner in which he opened and presided over the organization of the Fifty-third Session of the Nebraska Legislature".

Parsons filed for election as lieutenant governor again in 1940 but lost, coming in fourth in a closely divided five-way Democratic primary won by William H. Diers.

In 1944 he was the unsuccessful Democratic candidate for Nebraska Secretary of State.

== Family ==
Parsons married Cecelia De Broux in 1912; they had 7 children.
