= Walter H. Jurgensen =

American politician (1894–1973)

20th Lieutenant Governor of Nebraska
- In office 1933–1938
- Governor: Charles W. Bryan; Roy Cochran
- Preceded by: Theodore Metcalfe
- Succeeded by: Nate M. Parsons

Personal details
- Party: Democratic; Republican (previously)

Walter H. Jurgensen (October 1894 – 1973) was the 20th lieutenant governor of Nebraska from 1933 to 1938.

Jurgensen was born in Madison, Nebraska, in October 1894 to Peter and Sophia (Paulsen) Jurgensen. He attended high school in Spencer, Nebraska and college at the University of Nebraska, and worked in the insurance business. He married Margaret J. Carper of Cass County in 1920.

Before seeking political office, Jurgensen served as president of the Western Union Life Insurance Company in Lincoln, Nebraska. In 1928 Jurgensen, then a Republican, challenged Charles J. Warner, then an incumbent state senator, in the Republican primaries for his seat in the Nebraska Senate, but he was unsuccessful.

Jurgensen was first elected Nebraska Lieutenant Governor as a Democrat in November 1932, defeating Republican incumbent Theodore Metcalfe as part of a Democratic landslide in the state connected to Franklin D. Roosevelt's election as President. He was reelected in 1934, defeating Charles W. Johnson, and he defeated former lieutenant governor George A. Williams to win reelection to a third-term in 1936. As Lieutenant Governor, he formally opened the first session of the new unicameral Nebraska Legislature in 1937.

Jurgensen was removed from office in June 1938, after being convicted in March 1938 of embezzling $549 in a stock transaction between a co-defendant and a railroad station agent in September 1934. Jurgensen contested the conviction and sought renomination for a fourth term as lieutenant governor, but was declared ineligible to participate in the primary. His successor, Democrat Nate M. Parsons, was elected to fill out the remainder of his term, less than two months.

Jurgensen was sentenced to serve two to five years in prison, and was freed by the state pardon board in December 1940 after making an unopposed request to be released.

Political offices
Preceded by Theodore Metcalfe	Lieutenant Governor of Nebraska; 1933–1938	Succeeded by Nate M. Parsons
