= Roy Cochran (politician) =

American politician (1886–1963)

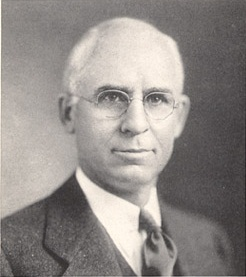

24th Governor of Nebraska
- In office January 3, 1935 – January 9, 1941
- Lieutenant: Walter H. Jurgensen; Nate M. Parsons; William E. Johnson
- Preceded by: Charles W. Bryan
- Succeeded by: Dwight Griswold

Chair of the National Governors Association
- In office September 14, 1937 – June 26, 1939
- Preceded by: George C. Peery
- Succeeded by: Lloyd C. Stark

Personal details
- Born: Robert Leroy Cochran; January 28, 1886 Avoca, Nebraska, U.S.
- Died: February 23, 1963 (aged 77) Lincoln, Nebraska, U.S.
- Party: Democratic
- Spouse: Aileen Gant (1888-1984)
- Children: 2
- Education: University of Nebraska (BS)

Robert Leroy Cochran (January 28, 1886 – February 23, 1963) was an American Democratic politician and the 24th governor of Nebraska.

Cochran was born in Avoca, Nebraska, and began his education in a sod school house. After graduating from Brady High school, he worked his way through and received a civil engineering degree from the University of Nebraska in 1910. First working for the County Surveyor, he was hired as a surveyor by the Atchison, Topeka, and Santa Fe Railroad. In 1912 he was elected County Surveyor and served in that position until 1916. During World War I, he served two years in the Army Artillery Corps and was discharged with the rank of captain in 1919. He was married to Aileen Gant on March 15, 1919, and the couple had two children, Robert Leroy Jr and Mary Aileen.

== Political and military career ==
Cochran served in the U.S. Army Coast Artillery Corps during World War I, being discharged with the rank of captain. He was commissioned in the Officers Reserve Corps after the war, reaching the rank of colonel and commanding the 515th Coast Artillery Regiment (Antiaircraft) from 1933 to 1941.

Cochran ran for governor of Nebraska and won in 1934, defeating the Republican candidate, Dwight Griswold, by 17,388 votes (50,8% to 47.7%). He was re-elected in 1936, again defeating Griswold, this time by 55.9% to 43.1%. In 1938 he was elected for a third term as governor, defeating the Republican candidate, Charles J. Warner, by 44% to 40.6%; a third candidate, Charles W. Bryan, received 15.4% of the vote. This made him the first governor to serve three consecutive terms. In 1940 he ran unsuccessfully for Nebraska senator, unseating incumbent Edward R. Burke in the Democratic primary, but losing the general election to Hugh Butler by 57% to 41.5%.

Cochran was called to active duty in the U.S. Army as the commander of Fort Leonard Wood, Missouri, from January 1941 to January 1942, before being retired for health reasons. He became Assistant Commissioner of the Federal Public Housing Authority from 1942 to 1943, and Commissioner from 1943 to 1944. He served as Deputy Commissioner of the American Mission for Aid to Greece. He retired from public life in 1956.

== Death and legacy ==
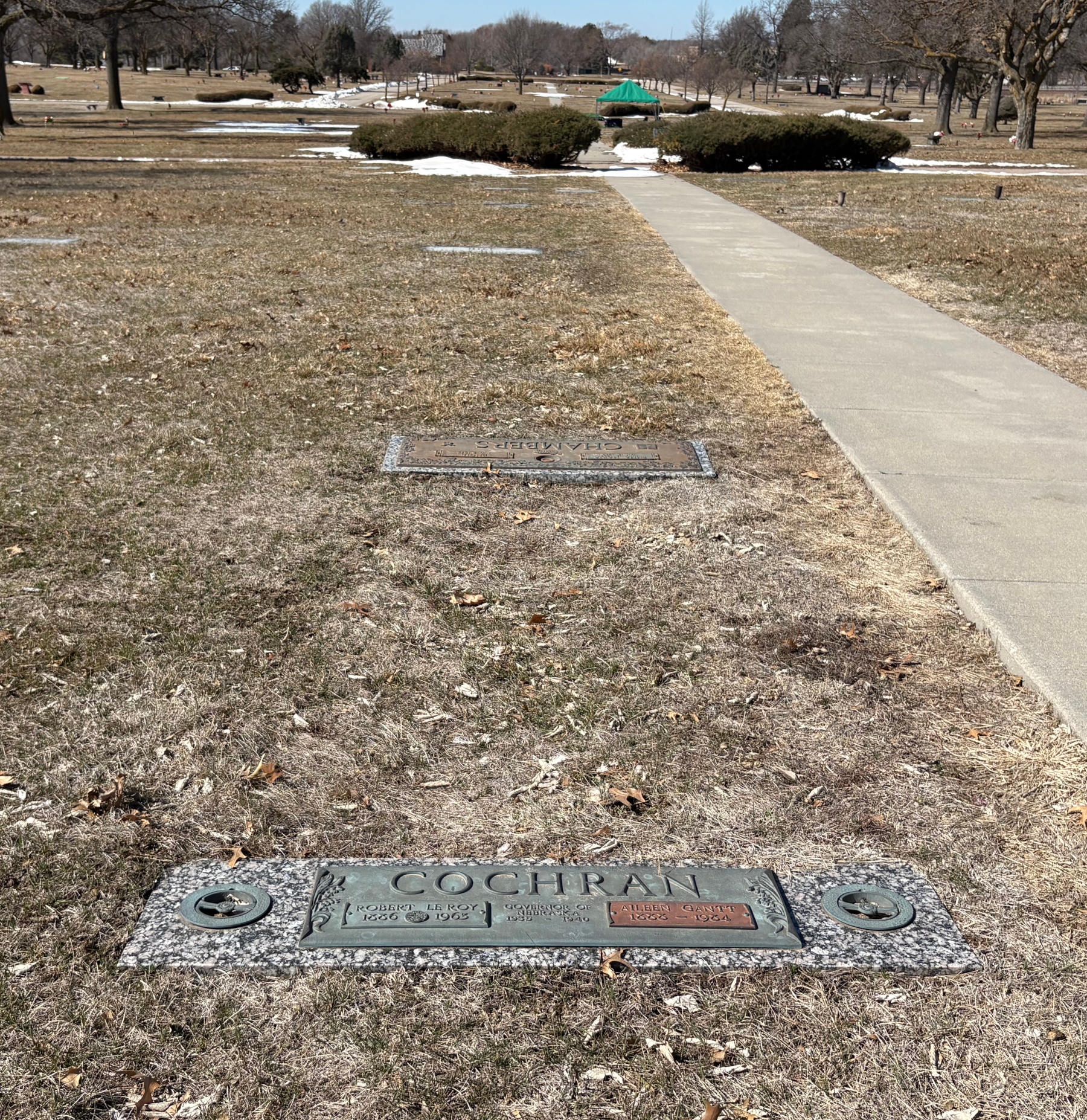
Cochran's grave at Lincoln Memorial Park

Cochran died on February 23, 1963. He was buried at Lincoln Memorial Park.

He was a member of the Episcopal Church, a Freemason, Knight Templar, Shriner, and member of Alpha Tau Omega.

Party political offices
Preceded by Charles W. Bryan	Democratic nominee for Governor of Nebraska; 1934, 1936, 1938	Succeeded by Terry Carpenter
Preceded by Edward R. Burke	Democratic nominee for U.S. Senator from Nebraska (Class 1); 1940	Succeeded by John Mekota
Political offices
Preceded by Charles W. Bryan	Governor of Nebraska; 1935–1941	Succeeded by Dwight Griswold
Preceded by George C. Peery	Chair of the National Governors Association; 1937–1939	Succeeded by Lloyd C. Stark
