= 1934 Nebraska lieutenant gubernatorial election =

- November 6, 1934

Nominee	Walter H. Jurgensen	Charles W. Johnson
Party	Democratic	Republican
Popular vote	295,684	226,006
Percentage	56.7%	43.3%
Lieutenant Governor before election
Walter H. Jurgensen
Democratic
Elected Lieutenant Governor
Walter H. Jurgensen
Democratic

The 1934 Nebraska lieutenant gubernatorial election was held on November 6, 1934, and featured incumbent Nebraska Lieutenant Governor Walter H. Jurgensen, a Democrat, defeating Republican nominee Charles W. Johnson.

== Democratic primary ==
=== Candidates ===
- Dr. John A. Guttery, a dentist from Lynch, Nebraska, who was nominated for the office of lieutenant governor by a petition signed by citizens from every town in Boyd County, Nebraska, which he accepted
- Walter H. Jurgensen, incumbent Nebraska Lieutenant Governor

=== Results ===
Democratic primary results
Party	Candidate	Votes	%
Democratic	Walter H. Jurgensen (incumbent)	134,218	78.51
Democratic	John A. Guttery	36,747	21.49

== Republican primary ==
=== Candidates ===
- C. A. "Doc" Green, from Lincoln, Nebraska
- Charles William Johnson, a farmer, rancher, merchant, and banker who served as the postmaster and county assessor for Cheyenne County, Nebraska, and in the Nebraska Senate from 1925 to 1933 from Potter, Nebraska
- Harvey L. Webster, a farmer, banker, and former member of the Nebraska House of Representatives from 1921 to 1923 from Tekamah, Nebraska
- Lewis C. Westwood, farmer from Tecumseh, Nebraska
- Stanley Wright, a farmer, masseur, and former member of the Nebraska House of Representatives from 1929 to 1931 from Alliance, Nebraska

=== Results ===
Republican primary results
Party	Candidate	Votes	%
Republican	Charles W. Johnson	45,272	31.89
Republican	C. A. Green	29,613	20.86
Republican	Harvey L. Webster	29,252	20.60
Republican	Stanley Wright	21,062	14.83
Republican	Lewis C. Westwood	16,778	11.82

== General election ==
=== Results ===
Nebraska lieutenant gubernatorial election, 1934
Party	Candidate	Votes	%
Democratic	Walter H. Jurgensen (incumbent)	295,684	56.68
Republican	Charles W. Johnson	226,006	43.32
Total votes		521,690	100.00
Democratic hold			

== See also ==
- 1934 Nebraska gubernatorial election
