= Theodore W. Metcalfe =

American politician (1894–1973)

19th Lieutenant Governor of Nebraska
- In office January 8, 1931 – January 3, 1933
- Governor: Charles W. Bryan
- Preceded by: George A. Williams
- Succeeded by: Walter H. Jurgensen

Personal details
- Born: August 16, 1894 Omaha, Nebraska, U.S.
- Died: February 19, 1973 (aged 78) Omaha, Nebraska, U.S.
- Party: Republican
- Spouse: Helen Houston

Theodore W. Metcalfe (August 16, 1894 – February 19, 1973) was the 19th lieutenant governor of Nebraska.

Metcalfe was born in Omaha, Nebraska in August 1894, the son of Omaha mayor and Panama Canal Zone military governor Richard Lee Metcalfe and his wife Elizabeth Buehler.

A member of the Republican Party, he was elected Lieutenant Governor of Nebraska in the 1930 election, serving with Democratic Governor Charles W. Bryan, brother of William Jennings Bryan. In his position as Lieutenant Governor, Metcalfe took advantage of Bryan's occasional absence from the state to play practical jokes, and in 1931 he established the office of Admiral in the Great Navy of the State of Nebraska, a humorous and effectively meaningless role which references the fact that Nebraska is the only triply landlocked U.S. state.

In 1934, Metcalfe ran in Nebraska's gubernatorial election, and was defeated by Dwight Griswold in the Republican primary. He again ran for office in the 1940 election for Nebraska's 2nd congressional district, and was defeated by Democrat Charles F. McLaughlin. In 1952 and 1960, he served as a delegate to the Republican National Convention from Nebraska. He died on February 19, 1973, and is interred in Forest Lawn Memorial Park, in Omaha, Nebraska.

Political offices
Preceded by George A. Williams	Lieutenant Governor of Nebraska; 1931–1933	Succeeded by Walter H. Jurgensen
