= 1932 Nebraska gubernatorial election =

- November 8, 1932
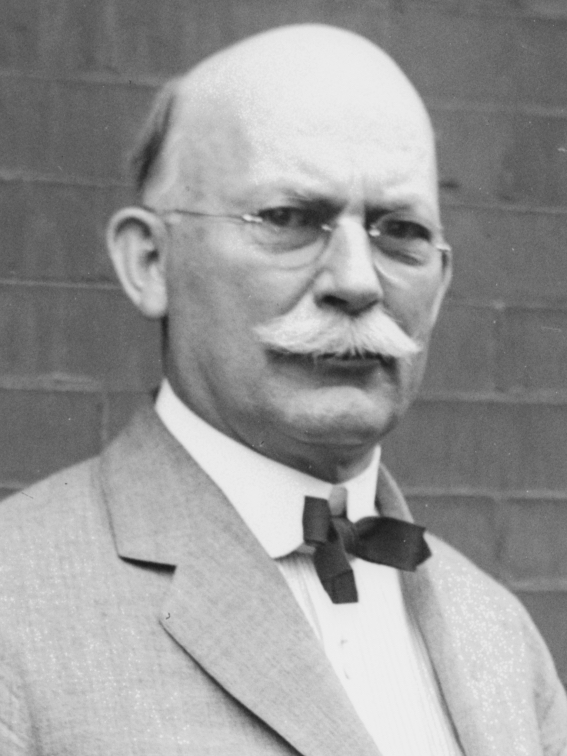

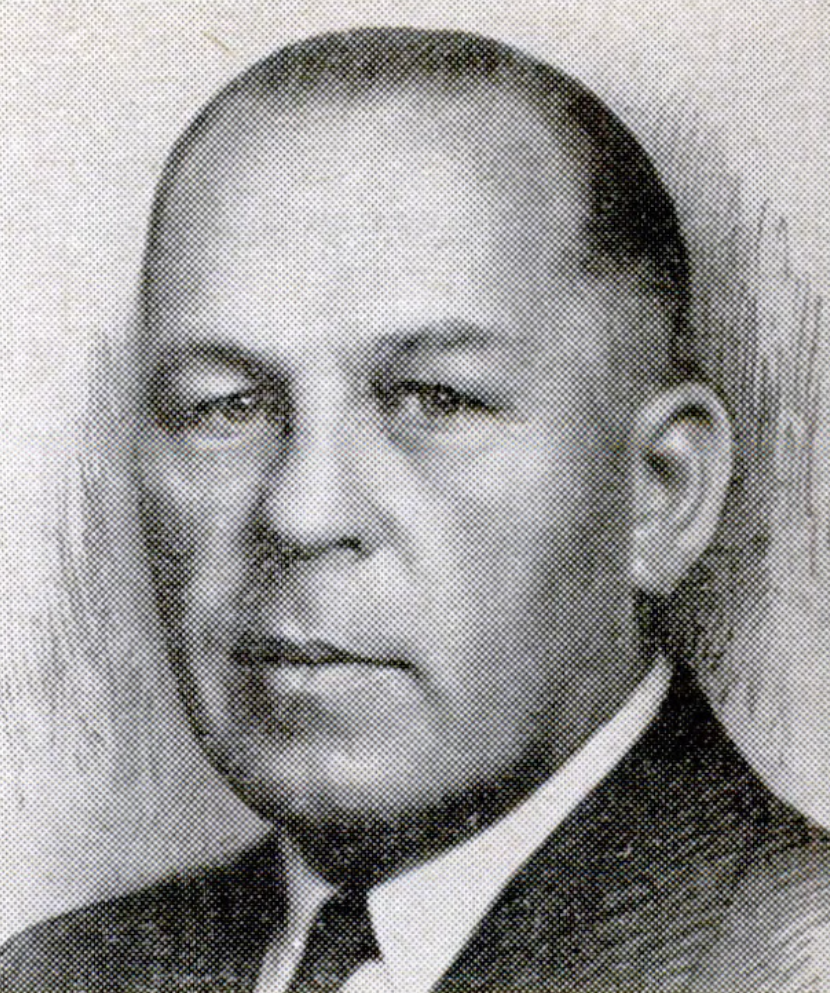
Nominee	Charles W. Bryan	Dwight Griswold
Party	Democratic	Republican
Popular vote	296,117	260,888
Percentage	52.53%	46.28%
- County results Bryan: 40–50% 50–60% 60–70% Griswold: 40–50% 50–60%
Governor before election
Charles W. Bryan
Democratic
Elected Governor
Charles W. Bryan
Democratic

The 1932 Nebraska gubernatorial election was held on November 8, 1932, and featured incumbent Governor Charles W. Bryan, a Democrat, defeating Republican nominee, newspaper publisher and former state legislator Dwight Griswold, to win a third and final two-year, non-consecutive term in office.

== Democratic primary ==
=== Candidates ===
- Charles W. Bryan, incumbent Governor
- James Franklin Christie, candidate for the Democratic nomination for governor in 1928
- George W. Olsen
- William Ritchie, attorney

=== Results ===
Democratic primary results
Party	Candidate	Votes	%
Democratic	Charles W. Bryan (incumbent)	86,748	60.10
Democratic	William Ritchie	49,934	34.59
Democratic	George W. Olsen	4,181	2.90
Democratic	James F. Christie	3,469	2.40
Democratic	Write-in	7	>0.01

== Republican primary ==
=== Candidates ===
- Dwight Griswold, newspaper publisher and former member of the Nebraska Legislature
- Frank Myers
- Murray F. Rickard
- Robert G. Ross
- Kenneth S. Wherry, member of the Nebraska Senate
- George A. Williams, former Lieutenant Governor

=== Results ===
Republican primary results
Party	Candidate	Votes	%
Republican	Dwight Griswold	39,386	36.32
Republican	Kenneth S. Wherry	36,365	33.53
Republican	George A. Williams	15,702	14.48
Republican	Frank Myers	7,113	6.56
Republican	Robert G. Ross	5,784	5.33
Republican	Murray F. Rickard	4,030	3.72
Republican	Write-in	72	0.07

== General election ==
=== Results ===
Nebraska gubernatorial election, 1932
Party	Candidate	Votes	%
Democratic	Charles W. Bryan (incumbent)	296,117	52.53%
Republican	Dwight Griswold	260,888	46.28%
Socialist	John M. Paul	6,733	1.19%
Total votes		563,738	100.0%
Democratic hold			

==== By County ====
By county

County	Person Democratic		Person Republican		Various candidates Other parties		Margin		Total votes
County	#	%	#	%	#	%	#	%	Total votes
Adams County									
Antelope County									
Arthur County									
Banner County									
Blaine County									
Boone County									
Box Butte County									
Boyd County									
Brown County									
Buffalo County									
Burt County									
Butler County									
Cass County									
Cedar County									
Chase County									
Cherry County									
Cheyenne County									
Clay County									
Colfax County									
Cuming County									
Custer County									
Dakota County									
Dawes County									
Dawson County									
Deuel County									
Dixon County									
Dodge County									
Douglas County									
Dundy County									
Fillmore County									
Franklin County									
Frontier County									
Furnas County									
Gage County									
Garden County									
Garfield County									
Gosper County									
Grant County									
Greeley County									
Hall County									
Hamilton County									
Hayes County									
Hitchcock County									
Holt County									
Hooker County									
Howard County									
Jefferson County									
Johnson County									
Kearney County									
Keith County									
Keya Paha County									
Kimball County									
Knox County									
Lancaster County									
Lincoln County									
Logan County									
Loup County									
Madison County									
McPherson County									
Merrick County									
Morrill County									
Nance County									
Nance County									
Nemaha County									
Nuckolls County									
Otoe County									
Pawnee County									
Perkins County									
Phelps County									
Pierce County									
Platte County									
Polk County									
Red Willow County									
Richardson County									
Rock County									
Saline County									
Sarpy County									
Saunders County									
Scotts Bluff County									
Seward County									
Sheridan County									
Sioux County									
Stanton County									
Thayer County									
Stanton County									
Thurston County									
Valley County									
Washington County									
Wayne County									
Webster County									
Wheeler County									
York County									
Totals									

== See also ==
- 1932 Nebraska lieutenant gubernatorial election
