= George A. Williams (Nebraska politician) =

American politician

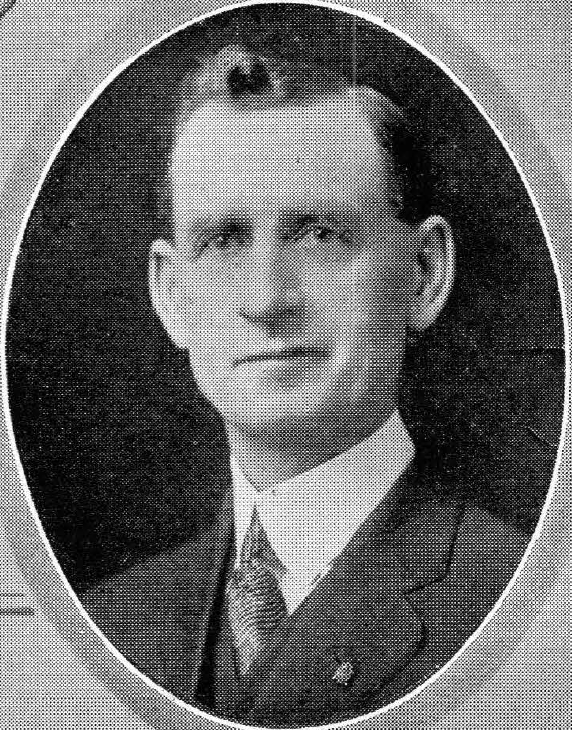

18th Lieutenant Governor of Nebraska
- In office 1925–1931
- Governor: Adam McMullen; Arthur J. Weaver
- Preceded by: Fred G. Johnson
- Succeeded by: Theodore W. Metcalfe

Personal details
- Born: George Arthur Williams; August 17, 1864 La Fayette, Illinois
- Died: July 7, 1946 (aged 81) Boulder, Colorado
- Party: Republican
- Spouse: Mabel L. Grubb
- Children: 8
- Profession: Merchant, Farmer

George Arthur Williams (August 17, 1864 – July 7, 1946) was a 20th-century politician who served as the 18th lieutenant governor of Nebraska from 1925 to 1931.

Born in La Fayette, Illinois, Williams attended school in Galva, Illinois, though didn't graduate from high school. In 1888, he married Mabel L. Grubb, with whom he would eventually have eight children, and moved to Fairmont, Nebraska where his wife's family owned a farm. Raised a Baptist, he and his wife joined Seventh-day Adventist Church after attending a meetings held by William Byington White, president of the Nebraska Conference of Seventh-day Adventists. Becoming missionaries, they moved their family to Citronelle, Alabama, where a new congregation was successfully organized under William's leadership, before moving first to Battle Creek, Michigan in 1901, then to Franklin, Kentucky, running successful mercantile businesses in each city. In December 1903, Williams assumed management of the store at the Southern Training School (today Southern Adventist University) in Graysville, Tennessee, where he also completed his formal education, and in 1908, took over management of the Adventist-sponsored Atlanta Sanitarium.

Returning to Nebraska in 1909, Williams began farming in Harlan County before becoming business manager of the Nebraska Sanitarium in Hastings and continued farming north of the city. In 1914, he and family moved back to the Grubb farm in Fairmont and became involved in community affairs, managing an American Red Cross fund drive and serving on the Fillmore County Council of Defense during World War I. A Republican, he was elected to the Nebraska House of Representatives in 1918 and reelected in 1920. As a legislator, he focused on road and farming issues and supported ratification of the Eighteenth Amendment to the United States Constitution. After running unsuccessfully for nomination for Secretary of State, he was elected lieutenant governor in 1924 and was reelected in 1926 and 1928.

Williams ran for Governor in 1932, placing third in the Republican primary, and again for lieutenant governor in 1936, losing to incumbent Democrat Walter H. Jurgensen. He served as president of the Nebraska chapter of the Anti-Saloon League until 1936 and remained active in church activities, working for the Religious Liberty Department of the General Conference of Seventh-day Adventists and writing for Liberty, the church magazine. He served on the boards of numerous church institutions and, in 1942, he served as interim pastor of the Lincoln City Seventh-day Adventist Church.

Williams was a member of the Sons of Union Veterans of the Civil War and honored as a Nebraska Admiral. He was a friend and ally of the state's longtime U.S. Senator George W. Norris. He died at Boulder Sanitarium in Boulder, Colorado and was interred at Fairmont Cemetery in Fairmont, Nebraska.

Political offices
| Preceded by Fred G. Johnson | Lieutenant Governor of Nebraska; 1925–1931 | Succeeded by Theodore W. Metcalfe |
