= 2014 Nebraska elections =

The 2014 Nebraska state elections took place on November 4, 2014. Voters in Nebraska elected all three of the state's representatives to the United States House of Representatives, as well as all statewide executive officials, including the Governor. Additionally, elections were held for half of the seats in the Nebraska Legislature, positions on the Nebraska Public Service Commission, the State Board of Education, and the Board of Regents. Judicial retention elections and several constitutional amendments were also on the ballot.

== United States Senate ==
Incumbent Republican senator Mike Johanns declined to run for re-election to a second term. Republican Ben Sasse, the President of Midland University, won the Republican primary to succeed him over banker Sid Dinsdale, former State Treasurer Shane Osborn, attorney Bart McLeay, and businessman Clifton Johnson. In the general election, Sasse defeated Democratic nominee David Domina, a prominent attorney.

2014 United States Senate election in Nebraska
Party	Candidate	Votes	%	±%
Republican	Ben Sasse	347,636	64.34%	+6.82%
Democratic	Dave Domina	170,127	31.49%	−8.57%
Independent	Jim Jenkins	15,868	2.94%	—
Independent	Todd Watson	6,260	1.16%	—
Write-in		446	0.08%	—
Majority		177,509	32.85%	+15.39%
Total votes		540,337	100.0%	
Republican hold				

== United States House of Representatives ==
All of Nebraska's three seats in the United States House of Representatives were up for election in 2014, and all three incumbent Republican congressmen ran for re-election. Jeff Fortenberry and Adrian Smith won landslide re-elections in the 1st and 3rd districts, respectively. Congressman Lee Terry was narrowly defeated for re-election by Democrat Brad Ashford, one of just two Democratic gains in the House that year.

District	Republican		Democratic		Others		Total		Result
District	Votes	%	Votes	%	Votes	%	Votes	%	Result
District 1	123,219	68.82%	55,838	31.18%	0	0.00%	179,057	100%	Republican hold
District 2	78,157	45.57%	83,872	48.90%	9,480	5.53%	171,509	100%	Democratic gain
District 3	139,440	75.39%	45,524	24.61%	0	0.00%	184,964	100%	Republican hold
Total	340,816	63.64%	185,234	34.59%	9,480	1.77%	535,530	100%	

== Governor and lieutenant governor ==
Incumbent Republican Governor Dave Heineman was term-limited and could not run for re-election to a third consecutive term. Businessman and 2006 Senate candidate Pete Ricketts narrowly won the Republican primary over Attorney General Jon Bruning and faced former University Regent Chuck Hassebrook in the general election, whom he defeated in a landslide.

2014 Nebraska gubernatorial election
Party	Candidate	Votes	%	±%
Republican	Pete Ricketts	308,751	57.15%	−16.75%
Democratic	Chuck Hassebrook	211,905	39.23%	+13.13%
Libertarian	Mark Elworth	19,001	3.52%	—
Write-in		545	0.10%	—
Majority		96,846	17.92%	−29.89%
Total votes		540,202	100.0%	
Republican hold				

== Secretary of State ==
2014 Nebraska Secretary of State election

Nominee	John A. Gale	Ben Backus
Party	Republican	Libertarian
Popular vote	368,135	121,470
Percentage	75.1%	24.8%
- County results Gale: 60–70% 70–80% 80–90% >90%
Secretary of State before election
John A. Gale
Republican
Elected Secretary of State
John A. Gale
Republican

Incumbent Secretary of State John A. Gale ran for re-election to a fourth full term in office. He did not face major-party opposition and defeated Libertarian nominee Ben Backus in the general election with 75% of the vote.

=== Republican primary ===
==== Candidates ====
- John A. Gale, incumbent Secretary of State

==== Results ====
Republican primary results
Party	Candidate	Votes	%
Republican	John A. Gale (inc.)	175,764	100.00%
Total votes		175,764	100.00%

=== Libertarian primary ===
==== Candidates ====
- Ben Backus

==== Results ====
Libertarian primary results
Party	Candidate	Votes	%
Libertarian	Ben Backus	492	100.00%
Total votes		492	100.00%

=== General election ===
2014 Nebraska Secretary of State election
Party	Candidate	Votes	%	±%
Republican	John A. Gale (inc.)	368,135	75.19%	+5.44%
Libertarian	Ben Backus	121,470	24.81%	
Majority		246,665	50.38%	+10.88%
Turnout		489,605		
Republican hold				

== State Treasurer ==
Incumbent State Treasurer Don Stenberg ran for re-election to a second term in office. He was challenged in the Republican primary by Omaha businessman Christopher Costello, whom he defeated with 85% of the vote. In the general election, Stenberg was opposed by the Democratic nominee, Michael O'Hara, a law and economics professor at the University of Nebraska Omaha, and Libertarian nominee Michael Knebel, a futures broker. Stenberg defeated both to win re-election with 68% of the vote.

=== Republican primary ===
==== Candidates ====
- Don Stenberg, incumbent State Treasurer
- Christopher Costello, Omaha businessman

==== Results ====
Republican primary results
Party	Candidate	Votes	%
Republican	Don Stenberg (inc.)	172,861	84.98%
Republican	Christopher Costello	30,566	15.02%
Total votes		203,427	100.00%

=== Democratic primary ===
==== Candidates ====
- Michael J. O'Hara, University of Nebraska Omaha business law professor

==== Results ====
Democratic primary results
Party	Candidate	Votes	%
Democratic	Michael J. O'Hara	61,147	100.00%
Total votes		61,147	100.00%

=== Libertarian primary ===
==== Candidates ====
- Michael Knebel, futures broker

==== Results ====
Libertarian primary results
Party	Candidate	Votes	%
Libertarian	Michael Knebel	480	100.00%
Total votes		480	100.00%

=== General election ===
2014 Nebraska State Treasurer election
Party	Candidate	Votes	%	±%
Republican	Don Stenberg (inc.)	357,474	68.14%	−4.80%
Democratic	Michael J. O'Hara	139,101	26.52%	−0.54%
Libertarian	Michael Knebel	28,009	5.34%	
Majority		218,373	41.63%	−4.25%
Turnout		524,584		
Republican hold				

Results by county Stenberg: 50–60%; 60–70%; 70–80%; 80–90%; 90–100%

== Attorney General ==
2014 Nebraska Attorney General election
- November 3, 2014
Nominee	Doug Peterson	Janet Stewart
Party	Republican	Democratic
Popular vote	339,846	174,614
Percentage	66.06%	33.94%
- County results Peterson: 50–60% 60–70% 70–80% 80–90% >90%
Attorney General before election
Jon Bruning
Republican
Elected Attorney General
Doug Peterson
Republican

Incumbent Republican Attorney General Jon Bruning did not run for a fourth term, instead unsuccessfully running 2014 Nebraska gubernatorial election#Republican primary for Governor. A crowded Republican primary developed, with three attorneys in private practice—Doug Peterson, Brian C. Buescher, and Mike Hilgers—and State Senator Pete Pirsch all running. Peterson won the primary with a 34% plurality and advanced to the general election, where he faced attorney Janet Stewart, the Democratic nominee. He won his first term as Attorney General over Stewart with 66% of the vote.

=== Republican primary ===
==== Candidates ====
- Doug Peterson, Lincoln attorney and nephew of former Governor Val Peterson
- Brian C. Buescher, Omaha attorney
- Mike Hilgers, Lincoln attorney and 2012 candidate for the state legislature
- Pete Pirsch, State Senator

==== Results ====
Republican primary results
Party	Candidate	Votes	%
Republican	Doug Peterson	67,678	34.05%
Republican	Brian C. Buescher	48,316	24.30%
Republican	Mike Hilgers	43,371	21.83%
Republican	Pete Pirsch	30,321	15.82%
Total votes		198,686	100.00%

=== Democratic primary ===
==== Candidates ====
- Janet Stewart, Fremont attorney, 2010 Democratic nominee for Secretary of State
- Allan J. Eurek, Lincoln attorney, 1994 Democratic nominee for Secretary of State

==== Results ====
Democratic primary results
Party	Candidate	Votes	%
Democratic	Janet Stewart	47,944	72.26%
Democratic	Allan J. Eurek	18,407	27.74%
Total votes		66,351	100.00%

=== General election ===
2014 Nebraska Attorney General election
Party	Candidate	Votes	%	±%
Republican	Doug Peterson	339,846	66.06%	−33.94%
Democratic	Janet Stewart	174,614	33.94%	—
Majority		165,232	32.12%	−67.88%
Turnout		514,460		
Republican hold				

== Auditor of Public Accounts ==
Incumbent Auditor Mike Foley opted to run for Governor instead of seeking re-election. State Senator Charlie Janssen won the Republican primary over Larry Anderson, an employee in the office, and faced fellow State Senator Amanda McGill, the Democratic nominee, in the general election. Janssen defeated McGill by a wide margin to win his first term.

=== Republican primary ===
==== Candidates ====
- Charlie Janssen, State Senator
- Larry Anderson, Auditor's office employee

==== Results ====
Republican primary results
Party	Candidate	Votes	%
Republican	Charlie Janssen	93,212	56.63%
Republican	Larry Anderson	71,389	43.37%
Total votes		164,601	100.00%

=== Democratic primary ===
==== Candidates ====
- Amanda McGill

==== Results ====
Democratic primary results
Party	Candidate	Votes	%
Democratic	Amanda McGill	63,414	100.00%
Total votes		63,414	100.00%

2014 Nebraska Auditor of Public Accounts election
Party	Candidate	Votes	%	±%
Republican	Charlie Janssen	294,688	59.07%	−20.55%
Democratic	Amanda McGill	204,221	40.93%	—
Majority		90,467	18.13%	−41.10%
Turnout		498,909		
Republican hold				

Results by county Janssen: 50–60%; 60–70%; 70–80%; 80–90%; McGill: 50–60%

== Public Service Commissioner ==
=== District 2 ===
Long-time incumbent Public Service Commissioner Anne Boyle, a Democrat, declined to seek re-election. Crystal Rhoades, a member of the Metropolitan Community College Board of Governors, narrowly won the Democratic primary over attorney Jim Esch and John Green, a member of the Omaha Public Power District Board of Directors. In the general election, she faced State Board of Education member John Sieler, the Republican nominee, and defeated him to win her first term on the Commission.

==== Republican primary ====
===== Candidates =====
- John Sieler, member of the State Board of Education

===== Results =====
Republican primary results
Party	Candidate	Votes	%
Republican	John Sieler	14,954	100.00%
Total votes		14,954	100.00%

==== Democratic primary ====
===== Candidates =====
- Crystal Rhoades, member of the Metropolitan Community College Board of Governors
- Jim Esch, attorney, 2006 and 2008 Democratic nominee for Congress
- John Green, member of the Omaha Public Power District Board of Directors

===== Results =====
Democratic primary results
Party	Candidate	Votes	%
Democratic	Crystal Rhoades	5,974	42.85%
Democratic	Jim Esch	5,507	39.48%
Democratic	John Green	2,265	16.27%
Total votes		13,746	100.00%

==== General election ====
2014 District 2 election
Party	Candidate	Votes	%
Democratic	Crystal Rhoades	46,405	56.63%
Republican	John Sieler	35,519	43.37%
Total votes		81,924	100.00%
Democratic hold			

== State Board of Education ==
=== District 5 ===
Incumbent Board member Patricia H. Timm ran for re-election, and was challenged by Tecumseh businesswoman Christine Lade. Timm ran as a supporter of public education, while Lade campaigned against federal intervention in local schools, in support of "local and parental control of their children's education," and on her "conservative views." Timm defeated Lade by a wide margin to win re-election.

==== Candidates ====
- Patricia H. Timm, incumbent Board of Education member
- Christine Lade, Tecumseh businesswoman

==== Primary election results ====
Nonpartisan primary results
Party	Candidate	Votes	%
Nonpartisan	Patricia H. Timm (inc.)	18,973	59.76%
Nonpartisan	Christine Lade	12,781	40.24%
Total votes		31,754	100.00%

==== General election results ====
Nonpartisan general results
Party	Candidate	Votes	%
Nonpartisan	Patricia H. Timm (inc.)	27,923	57.91%
Nonpartisan	Christine Lade	20,291	42.09%
Total votes		48,214	100.00%

=== District 6 ===
Incumbent Board member Lynn Cronk declined to run for re-election. Maureen Nickels, a former teacher in the Grand Island Public School district, ran to succeed her, and was elected unopposed.

==== Candidates ====
- Maureen Nickels, Grand Island Public School teacher

==== Primary election results ====
Nonpartisan primary results
Party	Candidate	Votes	%
Nonpartisan	Maureen Nickels	36,220	100.00%
Total votes		36,220	100.00%

==== General election results ====
Nonpartisan general results
Party	Candidate	Votes	%
Nonpartisan	Maureen Nickels	48,624	100.00%
Total votes		48,624	100.00%

=== District 7 ===
Incumbent Board member Molly O'Holleran ran for re-election to a second term, and was challenged by retired school administrator Robin Stevens. O'Holleran and Stevens largely agreed on the need to reduce the emphasis on standardized testing and on their opposition to the adoption of Common Core standards. O'Holleran ultimately defeated Stevens by a wide margin to win re-election.

==== Candidates ====
- Molly O'Holleran, incumbent Board member
- Robin Stevens, retired school administrator

==== Primary election results ====
Nonpartisan primary results
Party	Candidate	Votes	%
Nonpartisan	Molly O'Holleran (inc.)	23,473	57.46%
Nonpartisan	Robin Stevens	17,372	42.54%
Total votes		40,845	100.00%

==== General election results ====
Nonpartisan general results
Party	Candidate	Votes	%
Nonpartisan	Molly O'Holleran (inc.)	34,502	61.96%
Nonpartisan	Robin R. Stevens	21,178	38.04%
Total votes		55,680	100.00%

=== District 8 ===
Incumbent Board member John Sieler opted to run for the Public Service Commission instead of seeking re-election. Political consultant Patrick McPherson, who previously served on the Papio Natural Resources District Board of Directors; retired school administrator and former Grand Island City Councilman Bob Meyers; and children's advocate Clarice Jackson all ran to succeed him. Though the race was formally nonpartisan, McPherson was a Republican and Meyers and Jackson were both Democrats. Meyers was endorsed by the Nebraska State Education Association, while Jackson, a charter school advocate, received endorsements from local Democrats and Republicans. In the nonpartisan primary, McPherson placed first and Meyers placed second, advancing to the general election. At the ensuing general election, McPherson defeated Meyers.

==== Candidates ====
- Patrick J. McPherson, political consultant
- Bob Meyers, retired school administrator
- Clarice L. Jackson, executive director and founder of the Voice Advocacy Center

==== Primary election results ====
Nonpartisan primary results
Party	Candidate	Votes	%
Nonpartisan	Patrick J. McPherson	9,315	41.51%
Nonpartisan	Bob Meyers	8,002	35.64%
Nonpartisan	Clarice L. Jackson	6,365	22.85%
Total votes		23,682	100.00%

==== General election results ====
Nonpartisan general results
Party	Candidate	Votes	%
Nonpartisan	Patrick J. McPherson	26,204	54.60%
Nonpartisan	Bob Meyers	21,797	45.40%
Total votes		48,001	100.00%

== Board of Regents ==
=== District 1 ===
Incumbent Regent Tim Clare ran for re-election and won his second term unopposed.

==== Candidates ====
- Tim Clare, incumbent Regent

==== Primary election results ====
Nonpartisan primary results
Party	Candidate	Votes	%
Nonpartisan	Tim Clare (inc.)	36,274	100.00%
Total votes		36,274	100.00%

==== General election results ====
Nonpartisan general results
Party	Candidate	Votes	%
Nonpartisan	Tim Clare (inc.)	51,394	100.00%
Total votes		51,394	100.00%

=== District 2 ===
Incumbent Regent Howard Hawks ran for re-election and won his second term unopposed.

==== Candidates ====
- Howard Hawks, incumbent Regent

==== Primary election results ====
Nonpartisan primary results
Party	Candidate	Votes	%
Nonpartisan	Howard Hawks (inc.)	24,216	100.00%
Total votes		24,216	100.00%

==== General election results ====
Nonpartisan general results
Party	Candidate	Votes	%
Nonpartisan	Howard Hawks (inc.)	48,651	100.00%
Total votes		48,651	100.00%

=== District 5 ===
Incumbent Regent Rob Schafer, who was appointed to the Board in 2013 to replace Lieutenant Governor Lavon Heidemann, ran for re-election for a full term. He was challenged for re-election by businessman Steve Glenn and former Regent Robert J. Prokop, who had previously served from 1971 to 1983. At the nonpartisan primary, Glenn and Schafer placed first and second, respectively, and advanced to the general election. In the general election, both candidates agreed on the need to keep spending and tuition low, and each argued that their experience was better suited for the position. Schafer received the endorsement of the Nebraska Republican Party and Governor Dave Heineman, while Glenn was supported by comedian and Nebraska native Dan Whitney, known as Larry the Cable Guy. Schafer ultimately defeated Glenn by a narrow margin to win re-election.

==== Candidates ====
- Rob Schafer, incumbent Regent
- Steve Glenn
- Robert J. Prokop, former Regent

==== Primary election results ====
Nonpartisan primary results
Party	Candidate	Votes	%
Nonpartisan	Steve Glenn	14,966	41.10%
Nonpartisan	Rob Schafer (inc.)	12,912	35.47%
Nonpartisan	Robert J. Prokop	8,410	23.43%
Total votes		36,288	100.00%

==== General election results ====
Nonpartisan general results
Party	Candidate	Votes	%
Nonpartisan	Rob Schafer (inc.)	32,126	53.25%
Nonpartisan	Steve Glenn	28,205	46.75%
Total votes		60,331	100.00%
