= Innocents Society =

Honor society at University of Nebraska Lincoln, US

- Founded: April 24, 1903; 122 years ago University of Nebraska–Lincoln
- Type: Honor
- Affiliation: Independent
- Status: Active
- Emphasis: Juniors
- Scope: Local
- Colors: Red
- Chapters: 1
- Headquarters: Lincoln, Nebraska; United States

The Innocents Society is the chancellor's senior honor society at the University of Nebraska–Lincoln, composed of thirteen men and women who apply during the spring of their junior year and are selected based on academic excellence, unparalleled leadership, and selfless service to the university and community. Members are known throughout campus, but the society retains secrecy through rituals and a secret meeting room. Members work to promote school spirit and create an appreciation among the student body of the greater values for which Nebraska stands.

== History ==
The society was founded at the University of Nebraska on April 24, 1903, through the efforts of alumni including George Condra and Roscoe Pound, a famous legal scholar who would later become dean at Harvard Law School. Pound and Condra drew on medieval customs of knighthood, as well as papal traditions, in forming the ritual and heraldry of the society. During their early years, the Innocents Society selected school cheerleaders, supervised an annual Olympics between the freshmen and sophomores, and planned Dandelion Day and Fete Day.

During the 1940s and 1950s, the Innocents Society coordinated freshmen beanie sales and wore identical jackets one day each week. The Innocents of these years were known for mischievous activities, but many of these antics died down during the 1970s. The 1980s brought renewed spirit to the Innocents, and although the Innocents today no longer coordinate Dandelion Day or choose members of the spirit squad, they carry on many of the traditions of the founders. In the mid-2000s, members led annual fundraisers for local charities.

The 2008–09 Innocents coordinated a service trip across the state of Nebraska, stopping at thirteen towns over four days and completing a service project in each town. This tradition was continued by subsequent classes.

=== Trophy games ===
The Innocents Society began the Victory Bell exchange between Missouri and Nebraska. In 1892, a bell was stolen from a Seward church by members of Delta Tau Delta and Phi Delta Theta; the bell served as a prize for the winner of athletic and scholastic competitions between the fraternities. In 1926 the bell became a college football trophy, awarded to the winner of the annual Missouri–Nebraska game. It was engraved with an "M" on one side and an "N" on the other. The bell tradition ended when Nebraska joined the Big Ten Conference, making the 106th class of the Innocents Society the last to trade (and keep) what had become one of the oldest college football rivalry trophies. In 2011, the 107th class of the Innocents Society began a new trophy exchange with the University of Iowa.

After the establishment of the Victory Bell, the Innocents Society helped establish a trophy game with Colorado – the head of a buffalo was mounted for $20 and named "Mr. Chips." The tradition ended in 1962 when Mr. Chips was misplaced by members of CU's Heart and Dagger Society.

== Symbols ==
The society was named for the thirteen Popes named Innocent, who have historically stood as champions against evil. The badge of the Society of Innocents is Mephistopheles' head above crossed tridents. Mephistopheles represents the evil the society seeks to overcome.

== Membership ==
Thirteen members of the junior class are selected for membership in the society each spring.

== Notable alumni ==
- Herbert Brownell Jr., U.S. attorney general
- Brian C. Buescher, U.S. district judge for the District of Nebraska
- Howard Buffett, U.S. representative from Nebraska
- Jon Bruning, Nebraska attorney general
- Bob Kerrey, governor of Nebraska and U.S. senator from Nebraska
- James Milliken, academic administrator
- Norbert Tiemann, governor of Nebraska
- Bill Thornton, football player and coach
- Kyle Vanden Bosch, football player
- Don Wesely, mayor of Lincoln and Nebraska state senator
