= Brian C. Buescher =

American judge (born 1975)

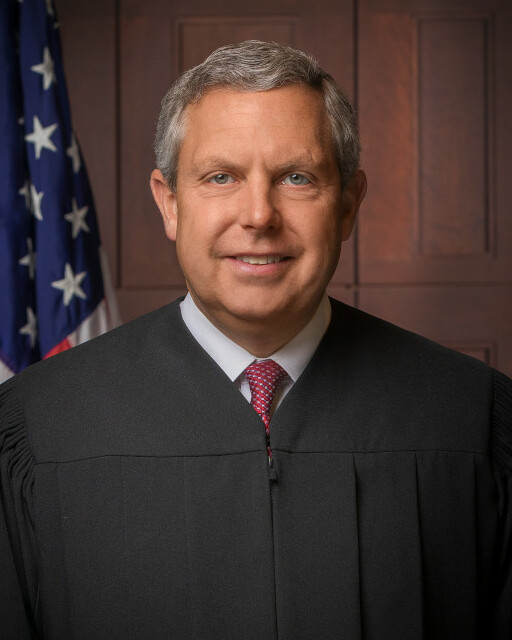

Chief Judge of the United States District Court for the District of Nebraska
- Incumbent
- Assumed office July 16, 2026
- Preceded by: Robert F. Rossiter Jr.

Judge of the United States District Court for the District of Nebraska
- Incumbent
- Assumed office August 6, 2019
- Appointed by: Donald Trump
- Preceded by: Laurie Smith Camp

Personal details
- Born: Brian Craig Buescher; 1975 (age 50–51) Beatrice, Nebraska, U.S.
- Party: Republican
- Education: University of Nebraska–Lincoln (BA); Georgetown University (JD)

Brian Craig Buescher (born 1975) is the chief United States district judge of the United States District Court for the District of Nebraska.

== Early life and education ==
Buescher was born in 1975, in Beatrice, Nebraska and was raised on a farm near Deweese, Nebraska. He graduated valedictorian from Sandy Creek High School near Fairfield, Nebraska in 1993. He received his Bachelor of Arts with honors and high distinction in economics and political science from the University of Nebraska–Lincoln in 1997. At UNL, Buescher graduated Phi Beta Kappa and as a Chancellor's Scholar, earning a cumulative 4.0 grade point average. He also served as president of the University of Nebraska Chancellor's Senior Honorary, the Innocents Society. Buescher received his Juris Doctor from the Georgetown University Law Center in 2000. At Georgetown Law, Buescher served as Editor-in-Chief of The Georgetown Journal of Legal Ethics, Vice President of the Georgetown University Law Center Student Bar Association, and he received the St. Thomas More Award for his outstanding publication in legal ethics.

== Career ==
After graduating from law school, Buescher joined the Omaha, Nebraska office of Kutak Rock LLP as an associate. He became a partner in 2007. At Kutak Rock, he led the firm's agribusiness litigation practice, with extensive experience in agribusiness, environmental, food law, real estate, product liability, class action, banking, and insurance litigation matters. Buescher served as the Chair of both the Nebraska Bar Association's Agricultural and Environmental Law Sections. In 2004, Buescher served as a prosecutor for Douglas County and Omaha while still working at Kutak Rock. He received the Excellence in Agricultural Law Award for private practice from the American Agricultural Law Association in 2017. He left Kutak Rock in 2019 after being appointed and confirmed as a federal judge.

In 2014, Buescher unsuccessfully ran in the Republican primary for Attorney General of Nebraska.

=== Federal judicial service ===
On October 10, 2018, President Donald Trump announced his intent to nominate Buescher to serve as a United States district judge of the United States District Court for the District of Nebraska. On November 13, 2018, his nomination was sent to the Senate. President Trump nominated Buescher to the seat vacated by Judge Laurie Smith Camp, who assumed senior status on December 1, 2018.

On November 28, 2018, a hearing on his nomination was held before the Senate Judiciary Committee. During or after the hearing in written questions, Sens. Kamala Harris and Mazie Hirono questioned Buescher about his membership in the Knights of Columbus, a fraternal Catholic charitable organization, which they alleged has "taken a number of extreme positions." The senators were then criticized by Sen. Orrin Hatch and others for allegedly "imposing religious tests on Federal judicial nominees," a potential violation of Article VI of the U.S. Constitution. Writing in the Los Angeles Times, Rabbi Mitchell Rocklin said that the senators approach amounted to a "religious test" such as is precluded by Article VI of the Constitution. Rocklin said: "The line of questioning Buescher faced about his affiliation with the Knights of Columbus sets a troubling precedent of intolerance—one that is unconscionable in principle and terrible in practice for people of all faiths who seek a role in public service. ...For centuries, many Jews have suffered a similar 'dual loyalty' smear: the anti-Semitic lie that, faced with a choice between country and religion, a Jewish public official will put his faith before his country." Rocklin noted the anti-Semitism experienced by Justices Louis Brandeis and Benjamin N. Cardozo, and further state, "It is even more absurd for senators to imply that a judge, who cannot propose or enact legislation, would be incapable of setting aside his religious beliefs when interpreting our written laws. ...If sitting lawmakers are allowed to make such assumptions of Catholic nominees, religious minorities could very well be next."

On January 3, 2019, his nomination was returned to the President under Rule XXXI, Paragraph 6 of the United States Senate. On January 23, 2019, Trump announced his intent to renominate Buescher for a federal judgeship. His nomination was sent to the Senate later that day. On February 7, 2019, his nomination was reported out of committee by a 12–10 vote. On July 24, 2019, the Senate invoked cloture on his nomination by a 52–39 vote. Later that day, his nomination was confirmed by a 51–40 vote. He received his judicial commission on August 6, 2019.

During his time on the bench, Judge Buescher has been appointed by the Chief Justice as one of fourteen federal judges on the Judicial Conference of the United States Committee on Information Technology. Judge Buescher has also been appointed to serve on the Federal Courts Online System for Clerkship Application and Review (OSCAR) Working Group, and the Information Technology Security Awareness Working Group. In the District of Nebraska, Judge Buescher has served many roles, including judicial liaison to the District of Nebraska Federal Practice Committee. Judge Buescher has also served as adjunct professor of law for Creighton University School of Law, teaching Federal Courts and Agricultural Law.

== Electoral history ==
2009

Omaha City Council — 3rd District Primary — April 7, 2009
Party	Candidate	Votes	%
Nonpartisan	Chris Jerram	1,402	23.41%
Nonpartisan	Chip Maxwell	1,373	22.93%
Nonpartisan	Brian C. Buescher	1,276	21.31%
Nonpartisan	Crystal Rhoades	1,198	20.01%
Nonpartisan	Jim Farho	570	9.52%
Nonpartisan	Steve Cross	145	2.42%
Nonpartisan	Write-ins	24	0.40%
Total votes		5,988	100.00%
Runoff election

2014

Nebraska Attorney General Republican Primary, May 13, 2014
Party	Candidate	Votes	%
Republican	Doug Peterson	67,578	35.65%
Republican	Brian C. Buescher	48,316	25.49%
Republican	Mike Hilgers	43,371	22.88%
Republican	Pete Pirsch	30,321	15.99%
Plurality		19,262	10.16%
Total votes		189,586	100.00%

Legal offices
Preceded by Laurie Smith Camp	Judge of the United States District Court for the District of Nebraska; 2019–present	Incumbent
Preceded by Robert F. Rossiter Jr.	Chief Judge of the United States District Court for the District of Nebraska; 2026–present	Incumbent
