= 2026 Nebraska Attorney General election =

- November 3, 2026
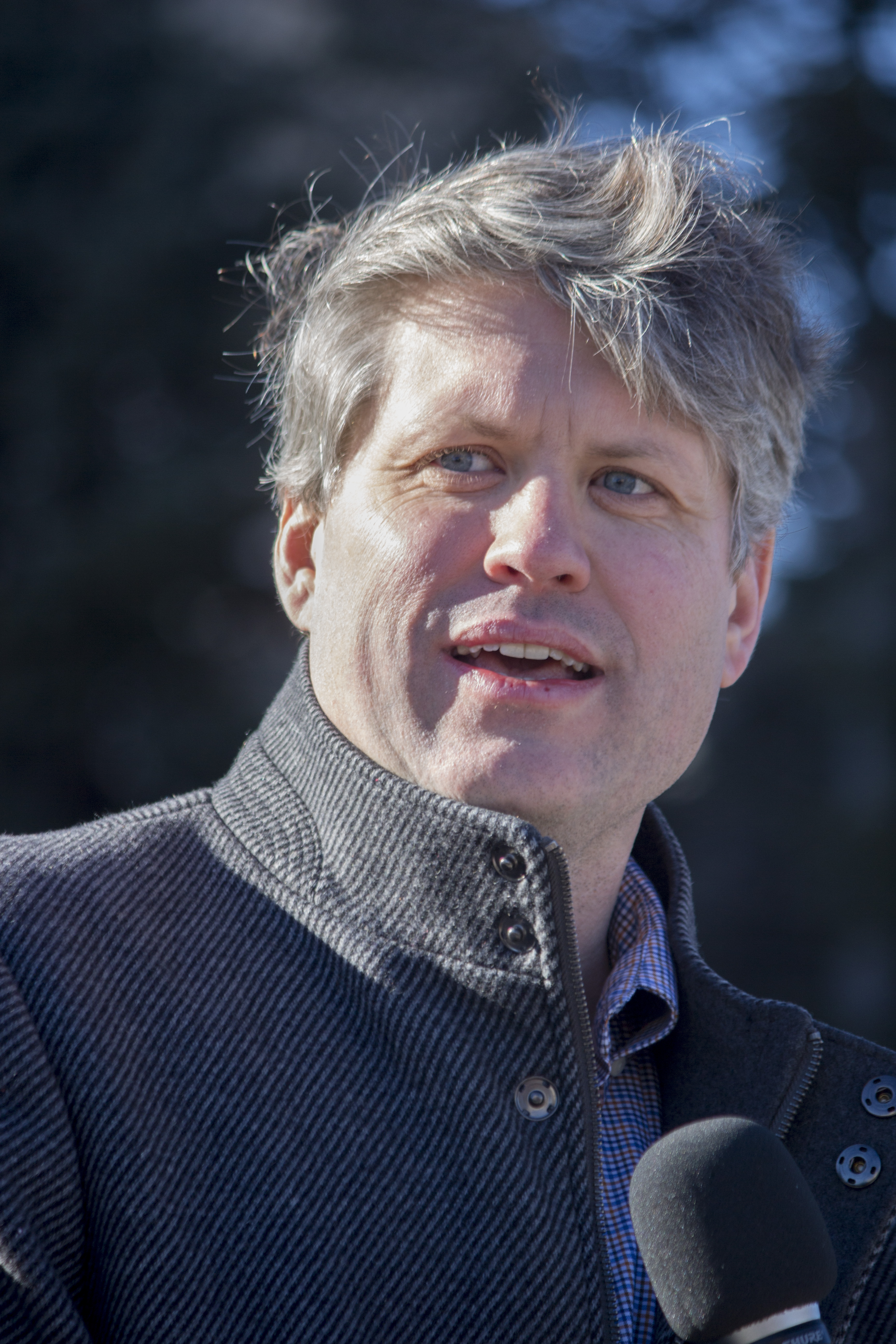

Nominee	Mike Hilgers	Jocelyn Brasher
Party	Republican	Democratic
Popular vote	412,134	323,433
Percentage	56.0%	44.0%
Attorney General before election
Mike Hilgers
Republican
Elected Attorney General
Mike Hilgers
Republican

The 2026 Nebraska Attorney General election took place on November 3, 2026, to elect the attorney general of Nebraska. Incumbent Republican attorney general Mike Hilgers, who was elected in 2022 with 69.7% of the vote, won re-election for a second term. Primary elections were held on May 12, 2026.

== Republican primary ==
=== Candidates ===
==== Nominee ====
- Mike Hilgers, incumbent attorney general

=== Results ===
Republican primary
Party	Candidate	Votes	%
Republican	Mike Hilgers (incumbent)	161,220	100.0
Total votes		161,220	100.0

== Democratic primary ==
=== Candidates ===
==== Nominee ====
- Jocelyn Brasher, former assistant attorney general

=== Results ===
Democratic primary
Party	Candidate	Votes	%
Democratic	Jocelyn Brasher	111,939	100.0
Total votes		111,939	100.0

== General election ==
=== Predictions ===
Source	Ranking	As of
Sabato's Crystal Ball	Safe R	August 21, 2025

=== Results ===
2026 Nebraska Attorney General election
Party	Candidate	Votes	%	±%
Republican	Mike Hilgers (incumbent)			
Democratic	Jocelyn Brasher			
Total votes			100.0	
Republican hold				

== See also ==
- 2026 United States attorney general elections
- Nebraska Attorney General
