= Harold P. Caldwell =

Attorney General of Nebraska for 31 hours in 1951

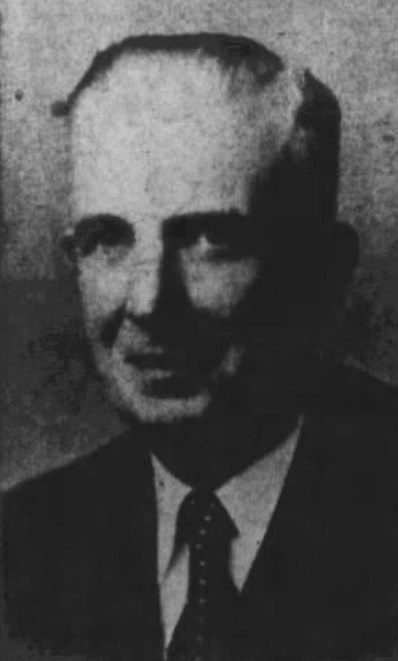

26th Attorney General of Nebraska
- In office January 2, 1951 – January 3, 1951
- Governor: Val Peterson
- Preceded by: Clarence S. Beck
- Succeeded by: Clarence S. Beck

Member of the Nebraska House of Representatives
- In office 1925–1927

Personal details
- Born: August 6, 1899 Omaha, Nebraska
- Died: May 31, 1959 (aged 59) Omaha, Nebraska
- Party: Democratic
- Spouse: Catherine Caldwell
- Children: 2
- Education: Creighton University School of Law (JD)

Harold Patrick Caldwell (August 6, 1899 – May 31, 1959) was an American politician and lawyer from Omaha, Nebraska. He was elected Nebraska Attorney General in 1950 in an uncontested special election to fill a vacancy but only served for about 31 hours. Caldwell also served briefly in the Nebraska Legislature and on the Omaha City Council.

== Early life and career ==
Caldwell in 1925 in the Nebraska Legislature

Caldwell was born in Omaha, Nebraska, to Patrick C. Caldwell, a judge and justice of the peace in South Omaha, Nebraska, and Anna Caldwell. He attended night classes at Creighton University School of Law while working during the day as a timekeeper and paymaster at a packing company. He earned his degree in law and was admitted to the bar in 1923.

In 1924, Caldwell was elected to a seat in the Nebraska House of Representatives and served from 1925 to 1927. At the time of his election, he was 25 years old and the youngest person ever elected to the Nebraska Legislature. After his brief time in the legislature, he worked as an attorney in private practice in Omaha, Nebraska.

Caldwell in 1938 when he ran for assessor

In 1938, Caldwell discovered a loophole relating to the office of county assessor for Douglas County, Nebraska. He realized that the appointment of the county assessor only lasted until election day in November and that anyone could run for the open seat after that. So, at the last minute, Caldwell entered the race, running to fill the "vacant" term. Caldwell pointed to the precedent of then Nebraska Attorney General Richard C. Hunter who had filed to run in a similar manner to fill a vacancy in the United States Senate in 1934. Caldwell's filing to run worried Carl King, the appointed county assessor, who quickly encouraged two of his employees to also file to run to fill the vacancy, one as a Democrat and the other as a Republican, before the midnight deadline on July 1, 1938.

On election day, November 8, 1938, Caldwell was victorious over his two opponents, winning the office of Douglas County assessor for the short term from November until January, when the candidate for county assessor for the regular term would take over. Upon winning the seat, Caldwell went down to the county assessor's office at 10 a.m. on November 9, the day after the election, to take over the office and begin serving as county assessor. It was reported that "Caldwell marched at once to the assessor's rooms, took off his coat and hat in [previous assessor] King's private office, and sat down at King's desk." To help with the transition of the office that was to occur in January when the candidate elected to the regular term of county assessor was to be installed, Caldwell appointed that candidate as his chief deputy assessor. In this same 1938 election cycle, another Nebraska Democratic politician named Nate M. Parsons used the same mechanism as Caldwell to be elected Lieutenant Governor of Nebraska for a short term to fill out a vacancy.

== Nebraska Attorney General ==
In March 1950, Nebraska Attorney General James Hodson Anderson resigned the office. Nebraska governor Val Peterson appointed Clarence S. Beck to fill the vacancy in the attorney general's office. However, Caldwell took notice of the same legal loophole in this situation that he had used to become Douglas County assessor for a short term. Although the governor had appointed Beck to the post, Caldwell argued that it was still a vacancy to be filled by a special election, since the governor's appointee could only hold office "until the next election." Thus, Caldwell filed to run for Nebraska attorney general at the last minute on June 30, 1950, to fill the vacancy.

Since no other candidates filed to run to fill the short-term vacancy, Caldwell was elected, but his election was disputed. Caldwell argued that he should take office immediately upon the vote being certified on November 27, 1950, whereas Beck argued that Caldwell couldn't take office until the Nebraska Legislature canvassed the result on January 2, 1951. Caldwell took his case to the Nebraska Supreme Court, seeking a writ of mandamus ordering the state of Nebraska to give him the office of attorney general immediately. The Nebraska Supreme Court heard oral arguments in the case on December 2, 1950. On December 9, it ultimately ruled in State ex rel. Caldwell v. Peterson et al. that Caldwell was duly elected to the office of attorney general for the short term, but it sided with Beck in ruling that Caldwell could not take office until the legislature had canvassed the vote. Former Nebraska attorney general Clarence A. Davis argued the case on behalf of the state against Caldwell.

Caldwell became attorney general on January 2, 1951, after the legislature had canvassed the vote. He only served in office about 31 hours until midnight on January 4, 1951, when Beck was reinstated pursuant to Nebraska Constitution Article XVII, Section 5, since he had been elected to the full term starting in 1951. Beck stated that he had spent the one day while Caldwell was in office between his two terms as attorney general "sharpening kitchen knives" for his wife. It was later implied that Caldwell had run for the office of attorney general for the short term in order to bring awareness to the loophole in Nebraska law that allowed it to happen. Caldwell's victory in this race allowing him to serve as attorney general for 31 hours eventually did result in the Nebraska Legislature changing the law to prevent future such cases.

== Later career ==
After the brief formality of serving as Nebraska's attorney general, Caldwell was elected to the Omaha City Council in 1951, on which he served for four years.

In 1956, Caldwell was elected to the Omaha Metropolitan Utilities District board of directors, a position that he held until his death.

== Personal life ==
Caldwell married his wife Catherine Caldwell (née Coad) in August 1931, which was after his service in the Nebraska Legislature. He and his wife had two children.

Caldwell died of a heart attack at his home at age 59 on May 31, 1959.
