= 2022 Nebraska Attorney General election =

- November 8, 2022
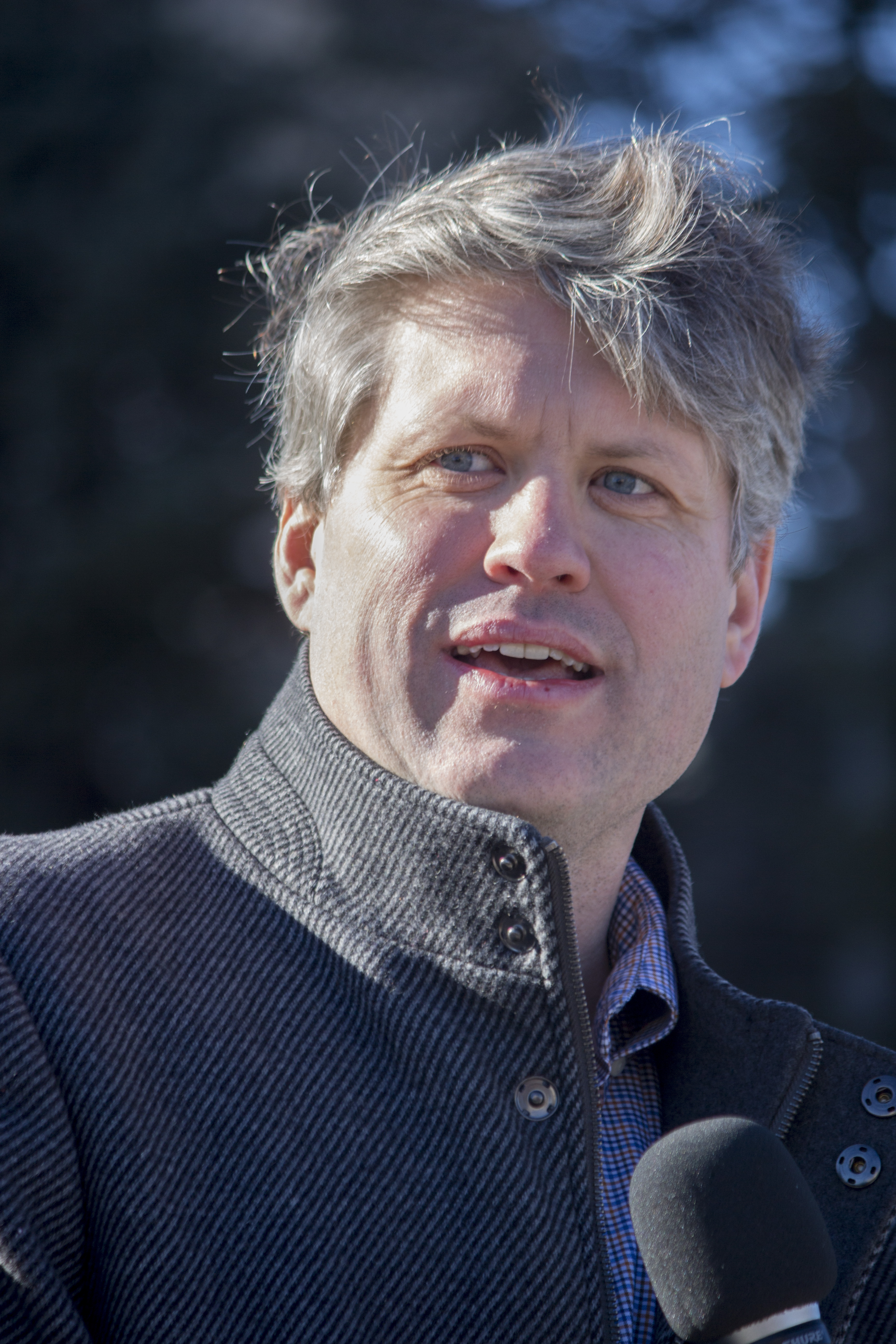

Nominee	Mike Hilgers	Larry Bolinger
Party	Republican	Legal Marijuana Now
Popular vote	434,671	188,649
Percentage	69.73%	30.27%
- County results Hilgers: 50-60% 60-70% 70-80% 80-90% >90%
Attorney General before election
Doug Peterson
Republican
Elected Attorney General
Mike Hilgers
Republican

The 2022 Nebraska Attorney General election was held on November 8, 2022, to elect the next attorney general of Nebraska. Incumbent Republican Attorney General Doug Peterson was eligible to run for a third term, but he announced on December 14, 2021, that he would not run for re-election.

No Democratic candidates filed to run for the position, and Hilgers faced Legal Marijuana Now candidate, former Republican congressional candidate Larry Bolinger, in the general election.

== Republican primary ==
=== Candidates ===
==== Nominee ====
- Mike Hilgers, Speaker of the Nebraska Legislature

==== Eliminated in primary ====
- Jennifer Hicks, conservative activist

==== Declined ====
- Doug Peterson, incumbent attorney general

=== Endorsements ===
Mike Hilgers

U.S. Senators

- Deb Fischer, U.S. Senator from Nebraska (2013–present)

Governors

- Dave Heineman, former Governor of Nebraska (2005–2015)
- Kay Orr, former Governor of Nebraska (1987–1991)
- Pete Ricketts, Governor of Nebraska (2015–present)

Attorneys General

- Doug Peterson, Nebraska Attorney General (2016–2021)

State legislators

- Mike Flood, U.S. Representative for Nebraska's 1st congressional district (2022–present), state senator from the 19th district (2005–2013; 2021–2022), former speaker of the Nebraska Legislature (2007–2013)
- Jim Scheer, former state senator from the 19th district (2013–2021), former speaker of the Nebraska Legislature (2017–2021)

=== Results ===
Results by county Hilgers: 50–60%; 60–70%; 70–80%; 80–90%; Hicks: 50–60%; 60–70%

Republican primary results
Party	Candidate	Votes	%
Republican	Mike Hilgers	151,709	67.24
Republican	Jennifer Hicks	73,906	32.76
Total votes		225,615	100.00

== Legal Marijuana Now primary ==
=== Candidates ===
==== Declared ====
- Larry Bolinger, author and Republican candidate for Nebraska's 3rd congressional district in 2018 and 2020

=== Results ===
Legal Marijuana Now primary results
Party	Candidate	Votes	%
Legal Marijuana Now	Larry Bolinger	912	100.00
Total votes		912	100.00

== General election ==
=== Predictions ===
Source	Ranking	As of
Sabato's Crystal Ball	Safe R	September 14, 2022
Elections Daily	Safe R	November 1, 2022

=== Results ===
2022 Nebraska Attorney General election
Party	Candidate	Votes	%	±%
Republican	Mike Hilgers	434,671	69.73%	−30.27%
Legal Marijuana Now	Larry Bolinger	188,649	30.27%	N/A
Majority		246,022	39.47%	−60.53%
Turnout		623,320		
Republican hold				

==== By county ====
County	Mike Hilgers Republican		Larry Bolinger Legal Marijuana Now		Total votes
County	%	#	%	#	Total votes
Adams	79.8%	7,621	20.1%	1,933	9,554
Antelope	90.2%	2,083	9.8%	226	2,309
Arthur	90.1%	209	9.9%	23	232
Banner	91.5%	323	8.5%	30	353
Blaine	90.5%	172	9.5%	18	290
Boone	88.7%	2,072	11.3%	263	2,335
Box Butte	84.2%	2,707	15.8%	509	3,216
Boyd	93.6%	770	6.4%	53	823
Brown	90.8%	1,079	9.2%	109	1,188
Buffalo	82.1%	12,301	17.9%	2,688	14,989
Burt	78.1%	2,008	21.9%	563	2,571
Butler	84.3%	2,755	15.7%	513	3,268
Cass	70.6%	7,567	29.4%	3,153	10,720
Cedar	88.9%	3,227	11.1%	401	3,628
Chase	92.4%	1,317	7.6%	109	1,426
Cherry	89.2%	2,158	10.8%	261	2,419
Cheyenne	84.1%	2,696	15.9%	508	3,204
Clay	86.0%	2,220	14.0%	360	2,580
Colfax	83.7%	1,851	16.3%	360	2,211
Cuming	86.9%	2,610	13.1%	394	3,004
Custer	90.2%	3,718	9.8%	406	4,124
Dakota	79.5%	2,687	20.5%	693	3,380
Dawes	79.7%	2,396	20.3%	610	3,006
Dawson	85.1%	4,555	14.9%	795	5,350
Deuel	87.8%	629	12.2%	87	716
Dixon	85.8%	1,825	14.2%	302	2,127
Dodge	73.6%	7,995	26.4%	2,863	10,858
Douglas	55.9%	98,023	44.1%	77,361	175,384
Dundy	90.6%	653	9.4%	68	721
Fillmore	84.4%	1,888	15.6%	350	2,238
Franklin	88.7%	997	12.2%	139	1,136
Frontier	88.7%	906	11.3%	115	1,021
Furnas	88.2%	1,569	11.8%	210	1,779
Gage	77.9%	5,817	22.1%	1,648	7,465
Garden	85.9%	731	14.1%	120	851
Garfield	92.7%	669	7.3%	53	722
Gosper	90.8%	728	9.2%	74	802
Grant	94.8%	255	5.2%	14	269
Greeley	87.3%	762	12.7%	111	873
Hall	79.9%	11,363	20.1%	2,853	14,216
Hamilton	85.9%	3,320	14.1%	545	3,865
Harlan	88.8%	1,176	11.2%	149	1,325
Hayes	95.2%	355	4.8%	18	373
Hitchcock	87.2%	885	12.8%	130	1,015
Holt	91.1%	3,460	8.9%	338	1,798
Hooker	91.7%	319	8.3%	29	348
Howard	84.9%	1,930	15.1%	342	2,272
Jefferson	81.6%	2,080	18.4%	468	2,548
Johnson	79.3%	1,187	20.7%	309	1,496
Kearney	86.4%	2,124	13.6%	335	2,459
Keith	87.2%	2,443	12.8%	358	2,798
Keya Paha	96.1%	374	2.9%	15	389
Kimball	84.7%	1,091	15.3%	197	1,288
Knox	87.3%	3,008	12.7%	437	3,445
Lancaster	60.5%	63,375	39.5%	41,372	104,747
Lincoln	82.2%	9,466	17.8%	2,053	11,519
Logan	93.8%	300	6.3%	20	320
Loup	87.0%	275	13.0%	41	316
Madison	83.0%	9,253	17.0%	1,893	11,146
McPherson	97.2%	209	2.8%	6	215
Merrick	85.2%	2,646	14.8%	459	3,105
Morrill	84.7%	1,578	15.3%	284	1,862
Nance	81.7%	947	18.3%	212	1,159
Nemaha	79.2%	1,757	20.8%	461	2,218
Nuckolls	87.8%	1,315	12.2%	182	1,497
Otoe	78.1%	4,271	21.9%	1,198	5,469
Pawnee	83.1%	844	16.9%	172	1,016
Perkins	88.6%	949	11.4%	122	1,071
Phelps	89.5%	3,165	10.5%	373	3,538
Pierce	89.8%	2,458	10.2%	280	2,738
Platte	84.5%	8,846	15.5%	1,626	10,472
Polk	87.6%	1,703	12.4%	242	1,945
Red Willow	86.6%	3,321	13.4%	516	3,837
Richardson	78.8%	2,194	21.2%	589	2,783
Rock	93.6%	541	6.4%	37	578
Saline	77.1%	2,673	22.9%	795	3,468
Sarpy	65.4%	39,395	34.6%	20,814	57,209
Saunders	75.9%	6,903	24.1%	2,188	9,091
Scotts Bluff	79.3%	7,533	20.7%	1,962	9,495
Seward	83.0%	5,272	17.0%	1,079	6,351
Sheridan	88.9%	1,631	11.1%	203	1,834
Sherman	85.2%	961	14.8%	167	1,128
Sioux	91.8%	469	8.2%	42	511
Stanton	85.5%	2,010	14.5%	342	2,352
Thayer	86.0%	1,787	14.0%	292	2,079
Thomas	94.4%	287	5.6%	17	304
Thurston	70.3%	832	29.7%	351	1,183
Valley	88.8%	1,509	11.2%	190	1,699
Washington	79.1%	6,488	20.9%	1,716	8,204
Wayne	83.6%	2,390	16.4%	469	2,829
Webster	87.2%	1,079	12.8%	159	1,238
Wheeler	93.0%	306	7.0%	23	329
York	85.6%	4,069	14.4%	686	4,755

== See also ==
- 2022 Nebraska elections
