= Nelnet =

American financial services conglomerate

Nelnet, Inc.
- Type: Public
- Traded as: NYSE: NNI; Russell 2000 component
- Industry: Financial services
- Founded: 1996; 30 years ago
- Headquarters: Lincoln, Nebraska, U.S.
- Key people: Michael S. Dunlap (chairman); Jeff Noordhoek (CEO)
- Revenue: ▲US$969 million (2022)
- Operating income: ▲US$1.5 billion (2022)
- Net income: ▲US$396 million (2022)
- AUM: ▼US$15.2 billion (2022)
- Total assets: ▼US$19.4 billion (2022)
- Total equity: ▲US$3.2 billion (2022)
- Website: nelnet.com
- Footnotes; Financials as of December 31, 2022. References

Nelnet, Inc. is a United States–based conglomerate that primarily focuses on financial services including student and consumer loan origination and servicing. Additionally, the company operates an investing arm, an internet bank and has a 26% stake in Allo Fiber, a cable and internet provider. The company is headquartered in Lincoln, Nebraska.

== History ==
Nelnet was founded in 1996 by Mike Dunlap and Steve Butterfield. In March 2000, Nelnet bought UNIPAC Service Corporation, an existing loan servicing company which was founded in 1978 and based in Denver, Colorado. As a subsidiary, UNIPAC Service Corporation was then renamed Nelnet Loan Services, Inc. In June 2000, Nelnet acquired In Tuition, Inc., a loan-servicing company based in Jacksonville, Florida, which was founded in 1979.

Nelnet became a publicly traded company in 2003, at which point the two founders were co-CEOs. In August 2003, the parent company was renamed from Nelnet Loan Services, Inc. to simply Nelnet, Inc. The initial public offering occurred on August 19, 2003, for $200 million. Steve Butterfield stepped down as CEO in 2007.

Nelnet owns over 50 subsidiaries that administer and collect student loans throughout the United States and Canada, such as in Tuition, infiNET, LoanSTAR, and TriCura Canada, Inc. Through its subsidiary, FACTS Management, Nelnet owns RenWeb, a school management program.

On February 7, 2018, Nelnet completed its acquisition of Great Lakes Educational Loan Services, Inc. The combined company is the largest servicer of student loans in the United States, with $397 billion in loans, or around 42% of all student loans in the United States.

== Lines of business ==
Nelnet encompasses several service lines, including Nelnet Diversified Services providing loan servicing, Nelnet Enrollment Services providing college educational planning content (like Peterson's Publishing) and lead generation, Nelnet Business Services providing payment tech and community management solutions to schools, and other subsidiaries.

=== Other subsidiaries and investments ===
Allo Communications is a fiber optic cable and internet service provider headquartered in Imperial, Nebraska.

Health Education Solutions is an online certification course provider in the health education field, offering advanced cardiac life support (ACLS) and pediatric advanced life support (PALS) training and certification.

Total Well-Being provides services that motivate organizations' employees to achieve health & wellness goals.

Nelnet also invests in a number of startup companies, including Hudl, Nebraska Global, Eye Verify, Travefy, and Mind Mixer.

== Controversies ==
In February 2007, New York Attorney General Andrew Cuomo launched an investigation into alleged deceptive lending practices by student loan providers that included Citibank, The College Board, EduCap, and Sallie Mae, along with Nelnet.

The New York Times reported in August 2007 that Jon Bruning, Nebraska Attorney General, allowed Nelnet to be forgiven the $1 million settlement the company reached with Bruning in April 2007. Nelnet was accused of industry wide kickbacks, improper inducements, and gifts from student loan providers to colleges and universities. Nelnet agreed to provide $1 million to the state in support of a national financial aid awareness campaign. Bruning decided in August 2007 to forgive Nelnet its $1 million obligation after the company announced that it had reached a separate $2 million settlement with New York State Attorney General Andrew Cuomo.

Nelnet has also made significant financial contributions to United States congressional campaigns, including a contribution from Nelnet and Union Bank & Trust Company of $16,100 to Jon Bruning, Nebraska Attorney General, for his Senate election campaign. Nelnet spent approximately $200,000.00 in the 2015–2016 Election Cycle, per Federal Election Commission Records and have already spent an approximate $60,000 for the 2017–2018 Election Cycle.

A United States Department of Education audit revealed that from 1993 to 2007, Nelnet had utilized a loophole in federal tax legislation that allowed the company to receive a higher interest rate on specified loans, generating $278 million from taxpayers. Nelnet disputed the findings of the audit through a letter written to the United States Department of Education letting them know of this loophole, and ultimately, U.S. Department of Education ruled that Nelnet would keep the $278 million.

The Chronicle of Higher Education reported in August 2010, that Nelnet settled a case for $55 million. The suit was filed by a former Department of Education researcher named Dr. Jon Oberg. Nelnet and other lenders were accused of defrauding taxpayers of billions of dollars in student loan subsidies. The largest student lender in the country, Sallie Mae, is also listed as a defendant in the case. Oberg's suit ultimately led to taxpayer funds being returned by seven of the nine companies Oberg sued.
