= Nebraska Capitol Commission =

Commission overview
- Formed: February 20, 1919; 107 years ago
- Jurisdiction: Nebraska State Capitol and grounds
- Headquarters: Nebraska State Capitol Lincoln, Nebraska
- Employees: 28

The Nebraska Capitol Commission is the State of Nebraska's official custodian of the Nebraska State Capitol. The seven-member commission and its corresponding executive agency, the Office of the Nebraska Capitol Commission, serve to assure "the highest quality preservation, restoration, and enhancement of and long-term planning for the State Capitol and capitol grounds for the perpetual use by state government and the enjoyment of all persons".

== History ==
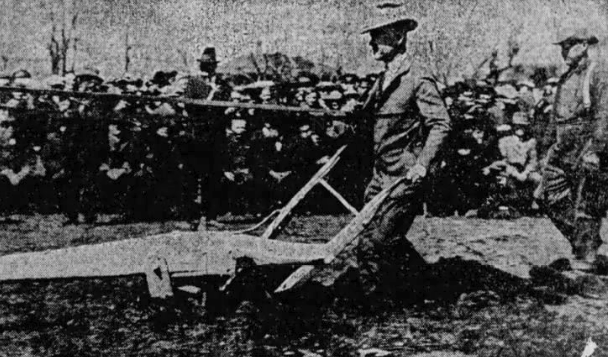
Governor Samuel McKelvie breaks ground for the new Nebraska State Capitol, April 15, 1922.

Nebraska Capitol Commission Members, 1919-1935
Member	Years served
Governors, ex officio
Samuel R. McKelvie	1919–1923
Charles W. Bryan	1923–1925, 1931–1935
Adam McMullen	1925–1929
Arthur J. Weaver	1929–1931
State Engineers, ex officio
George E. Johnson	1919–1923
Robert L. Cochran	1923–1935
Citizen members, appointed
William E. Hardy (Lincoln)	1919–1935
Walter W. Head (Omaha)	1919–1931
William H. Thompson (Grand Island)	1919–1935

=== Origins ===
On January 9, 1919, Governor Samuel McKelvie delivered his inaugural address before a joint session of the Nebraska Legislature from the rostrum of Representative Hall. Along the south wall of the hall, a dozen telephone poles with cross bracing attempted to stabilize the chamber. The roof trusses were inches from slipping off the supporting walls as the weak foundation caused the chamber to sink. McKelvie admonished:

The building of a new capitol is a matter that cannot be much longer deferred. Not only is the present capitol a discredit to the state, but it is inadequate to house the State Government and is actually unsafe for occupancy. . . . I believe it is time to approach this question in a courageous and businesslike manner, provide the ways and means for beginning the construction of a new capitol at the earliest convenient moment.

Previous governors had issued similar calls to no avail. McKelvie knew, however, that Nebraska, the United States, and the world were in a new era much different than that of his predecessors. With the signing of the final World War I armistice but two months before, civilization could now stabilize, rebuild, and remember. McKelvie concluded his plea for a new capitol:

If this project were undertaken now, the capitol could be dedicated to the memory of the gallant soldiers and sailors who enlisted their service during this war.

Three days after the inaugural ceremony, the Nebraska legislature introduced not one but two capitol bills. Representative George E. Tracewell of Valentine introduced House Roll 2, and Representative Grant S. Mears of Wayne introduced House Roll 3. (Only the moral urgency to ratify the Eighteenth Amendment to the U.S. Constitution prevented a capitol bill from being designated “House Roll 1”.) Both bills called for the creation of a five-member Capitol Commission to oversee construction of a new capitol, and both bills established a construction levy of one mill on each dollar’s valuation of property. Governor McKelvie favored the Mears bill—House Roll 3—the bill he personally drafted with assistance from a Lincoln attorney. Tracewell, unaware of the governor’s plan prior to introduction, agreed to abandon his measure and support the Mears bill. In that way, the Nebraska State Journal joked, Tracewell and Mears could “encourage the building of one capitol instead of two”.

On January 30, representatives passed House Roll 3 after the third and final reading (93 to 2), and the Senate, though it threatened to amend, subsequently passed House Roll 3 with no changes on February 17 (27 to 2). Three days later McKelvie not only signed the bill with its emergency clause but appointed the new Capitol Commission. William E. Hardy, president of Hardy Furniture Company, and Walter W. Head, vice president of the Omaha National Bank, were Republicans from Lincoln and Omaha respectively. William H. Thompson, a prominent lawyer, was a Democrat from Grand Island. The three citizen members joined the ex officio members, Governor McKelvie and State Engineer George E. Johnson, to become the Nebraska Capitol Commission.

The Nebraska Capitol Commission organized on May 9, 1919, and shortly thereafter, hired Omaha architect Thomas Rogers Kimball to serve as Professional Advisor. Kimball, president of the American Institute of Architects, believed a competition program would be the best means of selecting a capitol architect—an architect who would be unfettered by any predetermined plan, scope, or style. He organized the competition, received entries, and by late evening, June 26, 1920, a New Yorker named Bertram Grosvenor Goodhue was named architect for Nebraska’s new statehouse.

After the commission allowed a special property tax for construction to accrue, McKelvie ceremoniously broke ground on Goodhue’s skyscraper capitol on April 15, 1922. Ten years later, the superstructure was completed, yet the commission continued to oversee decorative finishes, furnishing, and landscaping through 1934. The commission issued its final report to the legislature in January 1935 and marginally operated until 1937. That year, the legislature dissolved the commission, and Governor Roy Cochran—who had served on the Capitol Commission from 1923 as state engineer—became the official custodian of the capitol.

=== Commission reestablished ===
Nebraska State Building Commission Members, 1949-1974
Member	Years served
Governors, ex officio
Val Peterson	1949–1953
Robert B. Crosby	1953–1955
Victor Anderson	1955–1959
Ralph G. Brooks	1959–1960
Dwight Burney	1960–1961
Frank B. Morrison	1961–1967
Norbert Tiemann	1967–1971
J. James Exon	1971–1974
State Engineers, ex officio
Fred H. Klietsch	1949–1951
Harold Aitken	1951–1953
L.N. Ress	1953–1958
Robert L. Cochran	1958–1960
John Hossack	1960–1968
Marvin Nuerenberger	1968–1970
Thomas D. Doyle	1970–1974
Citizen members, appointed
Tom Wake (Seward)	1949–1953
Gus Prestegaard (Lincoln)	1949–1952
W.C. Fraser (Omaha)	1949–1961
A.Q. Schimmel (Lincoln)	1953–1966
Jack Windel (Nebraska City)	1953–1959
Maurice Hevelone (Beatrice)	1959–1965
Linus Burr Smith (Lincoln)	1961–1974
Harold B. Stryker (Rising City)	1965–1968
Thomas C. Woods, Jr. (Lincoln)	1966–1974
Kermit Wagner (Schuyler)	1968–1974

In 1949, the legislature created the State Building Commission, effectively resurrecting the Capitol Commission after a twelve-year dissolution. The new commission charged the governor, state engineer, and three appointed citizens “to supervise the repairs and improvements of the capitol building costing in excess of ten thousand dollars”, and for the next twenty-five years, the commission carried out its duties with ever-expanding jurisdiction over the Governor’s Mansion and the planning of a new state office building.

In 1965, the legislature created the Department of Administrative Services to serve as a central agency to perform accounting, budgeting, and purchasing for the executive branch. Additionally, the legislature made the department the new custodian of the capitol and required the director to appoint a Superintendent of Building and Grounds to aid in the performance of the custodianship. In 1974, the legislature gave the department greater authority over the capitol by establishing the State Building Division and subsequently restructured the State Building Commission as an advisory board to the new division. With peripheral status, the newly named State Building Advisory Commission effectively ceased to function by the early eighties.

In 1993, the legislature resuscitated the commission by eliminating its advisory role and by giving it greater authority in overseeing the ongoing preservation of the Nebraska State Capitol. The legislature restored the commission’s original name and expanded the size of the Capitol Commission with four new ex officio members: the Chief Justice of the Supreme Court, the Speaker of the Legislature, the dean of the College of Architecture at the University of Nebraska–Lincoln, and the Director of the Nebraska State Historical Society.

=== Nebraska State Capitol Preservation and Restoration Act ===
The most recent major change affecting the commission occurred in 2004, with the adoption of the Nebraska State Capitol Preservation and Restoration Act. The act made the commission the official custodian of the capitol and the Office of the Nebraska Capitol Commission.

== Capital Commission, 1867 to 1869 ==
The 1919 Capitol Commission was Nebraska's first named “Capitol Commission”. From 1867 to 1869, Governor David Butler, Secretary of State Thomas P. Kennard, and Auditor John Gillespie served on a “Commission” that was responsible for locating and platting a seat of government to be named Lincoln, but contemporary legislative records and newspaper accounts only referred to the trio as the “Commissioners”. After said Commissioners completed their duties, Governor Butler became the de facto supervisor of the capitol building; a duty performed by subsequent governors until that “general supervision and control” was assigned to a newly created Nebraska Board of Public Lands and Buildings in 1877. This was the same board (consisting of the commissioner of public lands and buildings, the secretary of state, treasurer, and attorney general) that oversaw construction of the second state capitol beginning in 1879.

In the 1880s, many surrounding states established “capitol commissions” with specific responsibility for overseeing construction of their new capitol buildings, unlike Nebraska's Board of Public Lands and Buildings, which supervised all state buildings apart from the University of Nebraska. It was perhaps within this context that newspaper editor Charles H. Gere read a paper before the Nebraska State Historical Society on January 12, 1886. In "The Capital Question: Nebraska and the Location of the Seat of Government at Lincoln", Gere labeled Butler, Kennard, and Gillespie not as a “capitol commission” but more broadly, and rightly so, as the “Capital Commission”.

== Sources ==
- Nebraska Capitol Commission (1919–1935). Nebraska Capitol Commission Minutes. Nebraska Office of the Capitol Commission: Nebraska Capitol Collections.
