= Walter R. Johnson =

American politician (1897–1974)

25th Attorney General of Nebraska
- In office January 5, 1939 – January 6, 1949
- Preceded by: Richard C. Hunter
- Succeeded by: James Hodson Anderson

Member of the Nebraska Legislature from the 4th district
- In office January 5, 1937 – January 3, 1939
- Preceded by: Position created
- Succeeded by: William J. Norman

Member of the Nebraska House of Representatives
- In office January 6, 1931 – January 1, 1935
- Preceded by: C. Ray McKay
- Succeeded by: Earl F. Sallander
- Constituency: 8th district
- In office January 6, 1925 – January 4, 1927
- Preceded by: John R. Hughes
- Succeeded by: John A. Singleton
- Constituency: 9th district

Personal details
- Born: October 30, 1897 Omaha, Nebraska
- Died: August 12, 1974 (aged 76) Arlington, Virginia
- Party: Republican
- Spouse: Mary V. Burke (m. 1924)
- Children: 4
- Education: University of Nebraska; Creighton University School of Law
- Occupation: Attorney

Military service
- Allegiance: United States
- Branch/service: United States Army Air Service

Walter R. Johnson (October 30, 1897 – August 12, 1974) was a Republican politician from Nebraska who served as the 25th Attorney General of Nebraska from 1939 to 1949. He earlier served as a member of the Nebraska House of Representatives and the unicameral Nebraska Legislature.

== Early life ==
Johnson was born in Omaha, Nebraska, in 1897. He attended the University of Nebraska and the Creighton University School of Law and practiced as an attorney. Johnson served in the United States Army Air Service during World War I.

== Nebraska House of Representatives ==
In 1924, Johnson was elected to the Nebraska House of Representatives from the 9th district, which was based in Douglas County. He ran for re-election in 1926, and was defeated in the Republican primary by John A. Singleton. In 1930, he was elected to the State House again, succeeding Republican State Representative C. Ray McKay in the 8th district, and served from 1931 to 1935. During the 1933 to 1935 legislative session, he was selected as the Minority Leader of the State House. Johnson declined to seek re-election in 1934.

== Nebraska Legislature ==
Following the consolidation of the State House and State Senate into the unicameral legislature, Johnson ran for the newly created 4th district in 1936. In the nonpartisan primary, he faced engineer L. Roosevelt Brown, real estate investor Bob Cornett, former State Senator John W. Cooper, printer Emerson Howard, insurance broker John Shields, and State Representative A. Lincoln Sutton. Johnson and Sutton advanced to the general election, which Johnson won with 57 percent of the vote.

== Attorney General of Nebraska ==
In 1938, Johnson ran for Attorney General rather than seek re-election to the legislature, challenging incumbent Attorney General Richard C. Hunter for re-election. He won the Republican primary over former State Senator John W. Cooper and Scottsbluff City Attorney Straight Townsend, receiving 57 percent of the vote to Townsend's 22 percent and Cooper's 21 percent. In the general election, Johnson defeated Hunter with 57 percent of the vote.

Johnson ran for re-election, and was challenged by Michael McLaughlin, the Democratic nominee and a former assistant to Attorney General Paul F. Good. He defeated McLaughlin, 59–41 percent. Johnson ran for a third term in 1942. He defeated Cooper in the Republican primary, and faced a rematch with McLaughlin in the general election. Johnson defeated McLaughlin by a wider margin, receiving 66 percent of the vote to his 34 percent.

In 1944, Johnson ran for a fourth term, and was again challenged by Cooper in the Republican primary and McLaughlin in the general election. He defeated Cooper in the primary, and McLaughlin in the general election, receiving 64 percent of the vote to McLaughlin's 36 percent. Johnson ran for a fifth term in 1946, and was challenged by McLaughlin for the fourth time. He won the general election in a landslide, defeating McLaughlin, 67–33 percent.

During Johnson's final term in office, he registered as a federal lobbyist for the National Association of Attorneys General (NAAG). He lobbied Congress in support of legislation that would vest the title of submerged lands, and the mineral resources in them, in and beneath navigable waters, in state governments. After his registration was revealed, the chairman of the Nebraska Democratic Party called on Governor Val Peterson to remove Johnson from office. The Omaha World-Herald later called on Johnson to resign, arguing, "If he is earning his $1,500 a month as lobbyist for the coastal states he can hardly be doing justice to the job to which the people of Nebraska elected him." Governor Peterson and the chairman of the Nebraska Republican Party later joined the calls for Johnson's resignation, with Peterson referring to Johnson's lobbying activity as "morally indefensible." State Auditor Ray C. Johnson had planned to withhold Johnson's January salary, thereby triggering a legal battle, but Johnson declined to submit a claim for his salary. Peterson urged the legislature to consider a constitutional amendment to allow the governor greater authority to remove executive branch officials. State Senator Frank Sorrell, the 1946 Democratic nominee for governor, urged that the legislature to impeach Johnson, but no action was taken. Johnson did not seek another term, and was succeeded by James Hodson Anderson as attorney general.

== Subsequent career ==
After leaving elected office, Johnson relocated to Washington, D.C., and continued lobbying for NAAG. In 1954, he started practicing law in the District. In 1958, Johnson was nominated by President Dwight D. Eisenhower to the U.S. Board of Parole in 1958, but withdrew from consideration in favor of a civil-service position as a hearing examiner with the Federal Trade Commission.

== Death ==
Johnson died on August 12, 1974.
