= 2022 Grand Island, Nebraska mayoral election =

2022 Grand Island mayoral election
- November 8, 2022
Nominee	Roger G. Steele	Doug Brown
Popular vote	5,752	5,300
Percentage	52.06%	47.02%
Mayor before election
Roger G. Steele
Elected mayor
Roger G. Steele

The 2022 Grand Island mayoral election was held on November 8, 2022. Incumbent Mayor Roger G. Steele ran for re-election to a second term, and narrowly defeated challenger Doug Brown to win re-election.

== Primary election ==
=== Candidates ===
- Roger G. Steele, incumbent Mayor of Grand Island
- Doug Brown, operations security manager at Central Nebraska Regional Airport
- Julie Wright, businesswoman

=== Campaign ===
Incumbent Mayor Roger Steele was elected to his first term as Mayor of Grand Island in 2018 unopposed, and faced two separate challengers: Doug Brown, the operations security manager at the Central Nebraska Regional Airport and businesswoman Julie Wright, who owned several businesses in the city's downtown. Steele emphasized his leadership and accomplishments during his first time, including efforts to address crime and enhance infrastructure. He noted that the city was facing a shortage of police officers and pointed to his efforts to increase officer recruitment. Steele also argued that he had increased opportunities for mixed-use development in the city.

Brown focused his campaign on police recruitment, attracting workers to the region, and increasing community input in the redevelopment of the Central Nebraska Veterans' Home. He argued that the city should seek out additional federal and state grants for housing. Wright argued that the city needed to focus on "attainable" and "accessible" housing before it could focus on affordable housing, and that remedying the housing shortage in the region was critical.

Steele placed first in the primary by a wide margin, winning 48% of the vote. Brown narrowly defeated Wright to advance to the general election against Steele, defeating her by just 194 votes.

=== Results ===
2022 Grand Island mayoral primary election results
Party	Candidate	Votes	%
Nonpartisan	Roger G. Steele (inc.)	3,728	48.17%
Nonpartisan	Doug Brown	1,858	24.18%
Nonpartisan	Julie Wright	1,664	21.65%
Write-in		18	0.23%
Total votes		7,268	100.00%

== General election ==
=== Campaign ===
In the general election, Steele campaigned on his leadership of the city for the previous four years. Brown responded that he would be accessible, saying, "There's a lot of things going on out there that people want to get taken care of and just don't know how to do it or there's not a way for them to do it. I would like to get out there, work with them and find out what the issues are and what needs to be done," he said. Brown attacked Steele for the city's law enforcement recruit problem, but Steele argued, "We're very selective when we hire police officers, and we're not going to relax our standards, because our standards are high and we want that." Brown also emphasized the need to "look at all of Grand Island" when engaging in economic development and maintenance, and that "some places are getting a little trashy." Steele argued that Grand Island was not "much different from any other city," and faced challenges in responding to "rundown houses" and other unattractive parts of the city.

Despite Steele's lead in the primary, he only narrowly defeated Brown in the general election, winning his second term with just 52% of the vote.

=== Results ===
2022 Grand Island mayoral general election results
Party	Candidate	Votes	%
Nonpartisan	Roger G. Steele (inc.)	5,752	52.06%
Nonpartisan	Doug Brown	5,300	47.02%
Write-in		60	0.55%
Total votes		11,112	100.00%

== See also ==
- List of mayors of Grand Island, Nebraska
