= Travefy =

Travefy, Inc.
- Company type: Private
- Founded: 2012
- Founders: David Donner Chait, Chris Davis
- Headquarters: Lincoln, Nebraska, United States
- Website: https://travefy.com

Travefy (/ˈtrævɪˌfaɪ/) is a company based in Lincoln, Nebraska, that builds itinerary management and communication software for travel professionals including travel agents and tour operators among others. Travefy also provides online and mobile group travel planning apps that allow users to organize group travel, create itineraries, and track and split expenses. Travefy was founded in 2012 by Columbia Business School graduate, David Donner Chait and Nebraska-based developer, Chris Davis.

In April 2015, Travefy received a $1.8 million Series A investment and a key partnership with Travel and Transport, the 5th largest travel management company in the United States. Other investors in Travefy include Nelnet, Nebraska Global, Columbia University of New York City, Nebraska Angels, Linseed Capital LLC, and Campus Evolution Villages.

Travefy has been covered in national publications such as Forbes, The New York Times, Entrepreneur, U.S. News & World Report, and Fast Company.
