= List of mayors of Grand Island, Nebraska =

The following is a list of mayors of the city of Grand Island, Nebraska, United States.

- John Wallichs, 1873
- Edward Hooper, 1874–1875
- James Cleary, 1876
- W. H. Platt, 1877, 1887–1890, 1899–1900
- C. D. M. Washburn, 1878–1880
- John L. Means, 1881, 1885–1886
- Michael Murphy, 1882–1883
- Jay E. White, 1884
- Henry D. Boyden, 1891–1892
- Wm. M. Geddes, 1893–1894
- William H. Thompson, 1895–1898
- James Cleary, 1901–1904
- Henry Schuff, 1905–1910
- Chas. G. Ryan, c.1911–1915
- T. J. Ellsberry, c.1924
- M. W. Jenkins, c.1926
- O. A. Abbott Jr., c.1932, 1939–1940
- Thomas M. Dillon, c.1936–1938
- Harry Grimminger, c.1941–1947
- B. J. Cunningham, c.1947–1948
- O. W. Johnson, c.1950
- O. E. Cunningham, c.1953–1954
- E. Merle McDermott, c.1957
- Frank Ryder, c.1958–1959
- Howard Peterson, c.1965
- John Ditter, c.1970
- Oscar Bredthauer, c.1973
- James Minor, c.1977
- Bob Kriz, c.1978
- Bill Wright, c.1985
- Chuck Baasch, c.1986
- Ernie Dobesh, c.1990
- Ken Gnadt, c.1994–2002
- Jay Vavricek, 2002–2006, 2010–2014
- Margaret Hornady, c.2006–2010
- Jeremy L. Jensen, c.2015–2017
- Roger G. Steele, c.2019–present

== See also ==
- 2022 Grand Island, Nebraska mayoral election
- Grand Island history
