= William H. Thompson (Nebraska politician) =

American judge

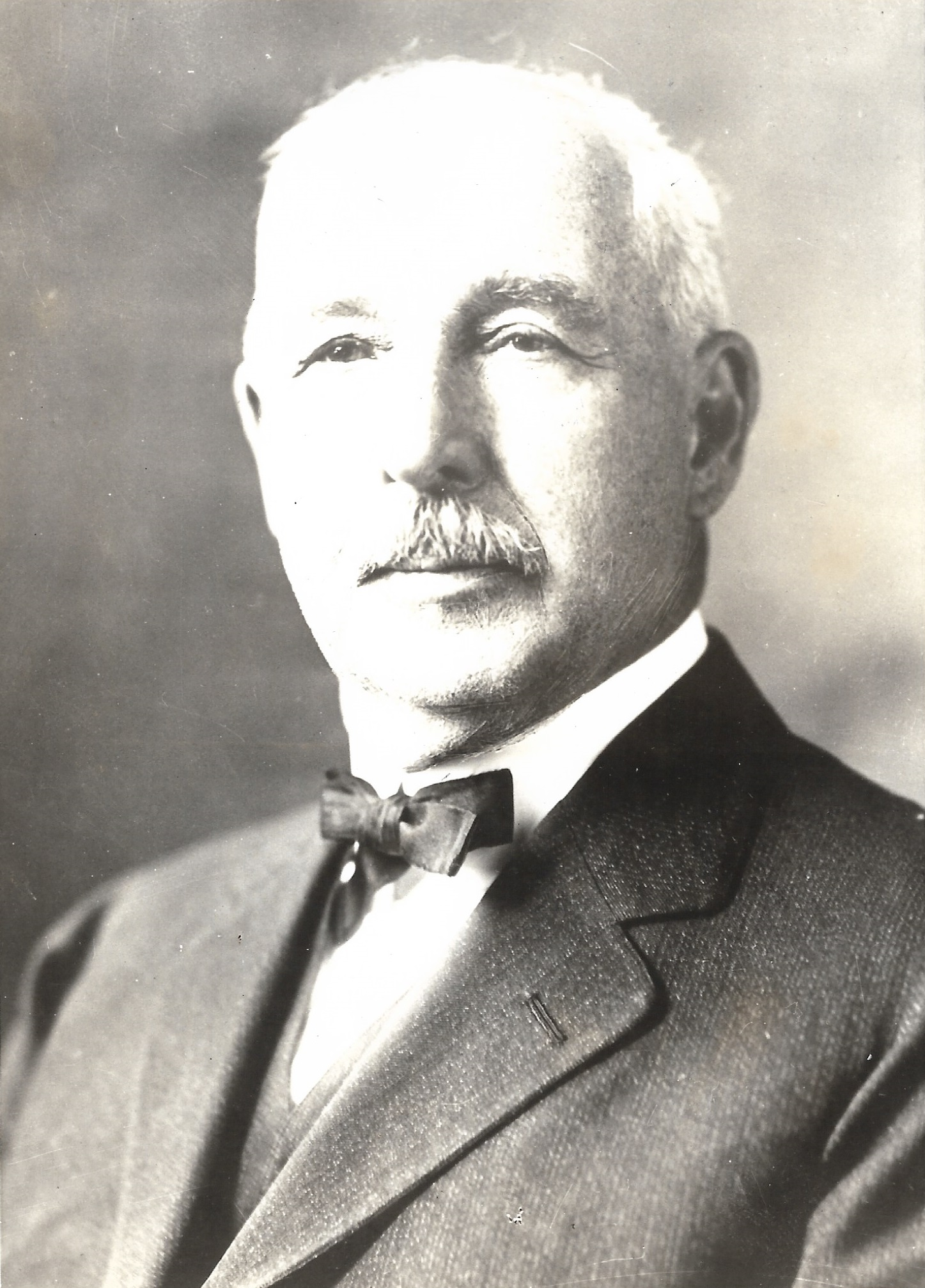
- 1933 photo by International News Service

United States Senator from Nebraska
- In office May 24, 1933 – November 6, 1934
- Appointed by: Charles W. Bryan
- Preceded by: Robert B. Howell
- Succeeded by: Richard C. Hunter

Personal details
- Born: December 14, 1853 Perrysville, Ohio, U.S.
- Died: June 6, 1937 (aged 83) Grand Island, Nebraska, U.S.
- Party: Democratic
- Spouse: Minnetta Inez Hutchison

William Henry Thompson (December 14, 1853 – June 6, 1937) was a Nebraska Democratic Party politician.

== Biography ==
Born in Perrysville, Ohio, Thompson attended Upper Iowa University in Fayette, Iowa, from 1872 to 1875, then graduated from the University of Iowa law school in 1877, being admitted to the bar the same year. He started practicing law in what was then known as Brush Creek, Iowa, but is now known as Arlington, Iowa. He moved to Grand Island, Nebraska, in 1881, where he practiced law and did some banking as well.

Thompson became Grand Island's city attorney from 1887 to 1888, then in 1890 lost an election for U.S. Representative to the 52nd Congress. He was a member of the board of trustees for Grand Island College in 1893, and served as mayor of Grand Island from 1895 to 1898. He was a member of the Democratic National Committee from 1896 to 1900 and again from 1920 to 1924.

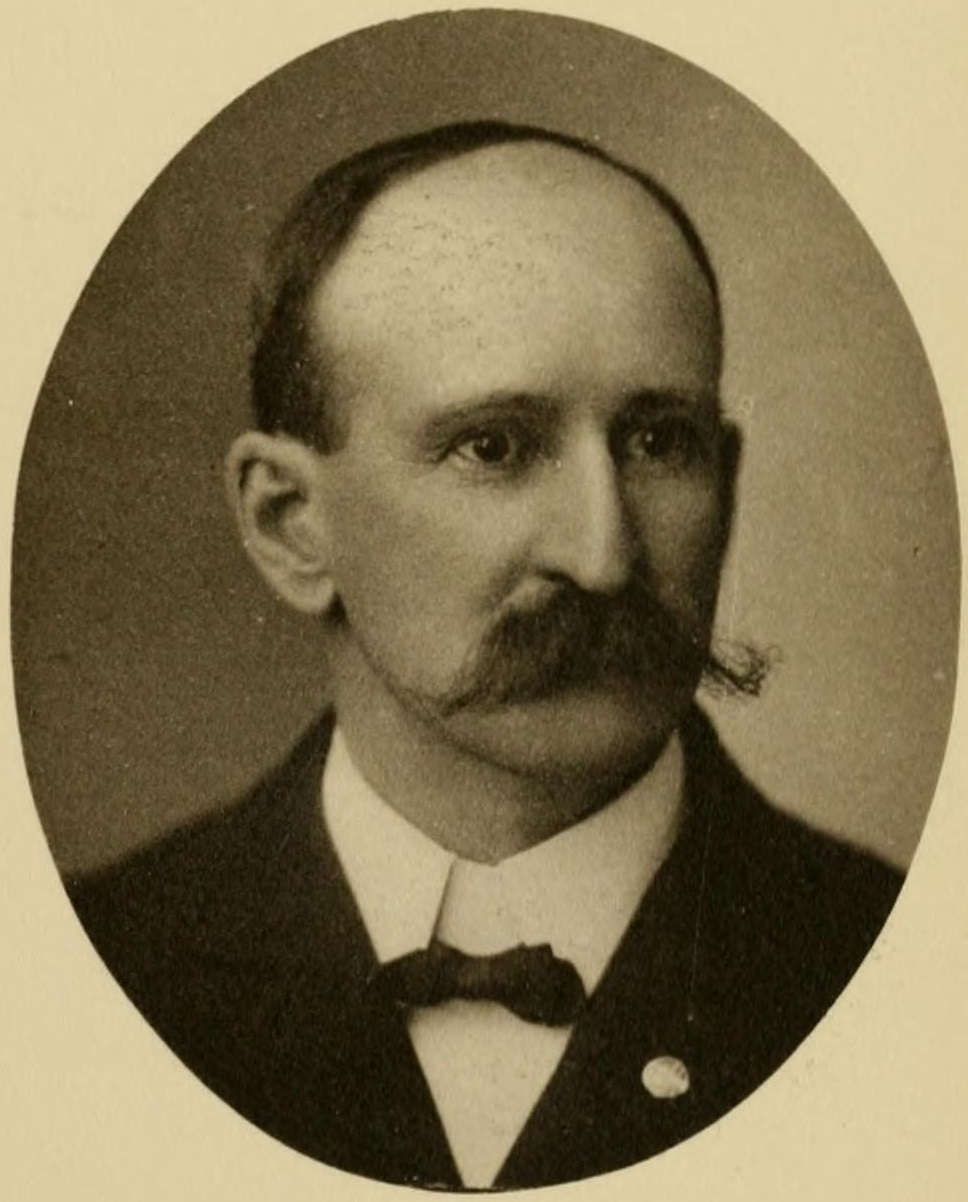
From 1904's Nebraskans, 1854-1904

In 1902, Thompson ran unsuccessfully for governor against John H. Mickey. He became a member of the Nebraska Capitol Commission, which oversaw the creation of a new capitol. Thompson served as an associate justice of the Nebraska Supreme Court from 1924 to 1931. In 1933, when Senator Robert B. Howell died in office, Governor Charles W. Bryan appointed Thompson to fill the vacant seat. He did not run in the subsequent special election, and fellow Democrat Richard C. Hunter was elected to succeed him.

Thompson died in Grand Island, Nebraska, on June 6, 1937, and was interred in Grand Island Cemetery.

== See also ==
- List of mayors of Grand Island, Nebraska

Party political offices
| Preceded by William A. Poynter | Democratic nominee for Governor of Nebraska; 1902 | Succeeded by George W. Berge |
U.S. Senate
| Preceded by Robert B. Howell | U.S. senator (Class 1) from Nebraska; May 24, 1933 – November 6, 1934; Served alongside: George W. Norris | Succeeded by Richard C. Hunter |
