= Clarence A. Davis =

American lawyer and government official (1892–1974)

Nebraska Attorney General
- In office 1919–1923
- Governor: Samuel R. McKelvie
- Preceded by: Willis E. Reed
- Succeeded by: Ora S. Spillman

Personal details
- Born: Clarence Alba Davis; November 21, 1892 Beaver City, Nebraska, U.S.
- Died: May 26, 1974 (aged 81) Lincoln, Nebraska, U.S.
- Party: Republican
- Education: Nebraska Wesleyan University (B.A.); Harvard Law School (LL.B.)
- Profession: Lawyer, public official

Clarence Alba Davis (November 21, 1892 – May 26, 1974) was an American lawyer, Republican politician, and federal official from Nebraska. He served as Nebraska Attorney General from 1919 to 1923 and later held senior posts in the United States Department of the Interior during the Eisenhower administration, serving as Solicitor of the United States Department of the Interior(1953–1954) and United States Under Secretary of the Interior (1954–1957).

== Early life and education ==
Davis was born on November 21, 1892, in Beaver City, Nebraska, in Furnas County. He attended Nebraska Wesleyan University, graduating in 1913, and went on to earn his law degree from Harvard Law School in 1916.

== Career ==
=== Nebraska politics ===
Following law school, Davis returned to Nebraska to practice law. In 1918, at age 25, he was elected Nebraska Attorney General as a Republican, taking office in 1919 and serving two terms until 1923.

=== U.S. Department of the Interior ===
In 1953, President Dwight D. Eisenhower appointed Davis as Solicitor of the United States Department of the Interior, the department's chief legal officer. In 1954, Eisenhower elevated him to United States Under Secretary of the Interior, serving under Secretary Douglas McKay and Secretary Fred A. Seaton. Davis resigned from the department in 1957 and returned to private legal practice in Nebraska and Washington, D.C.

Legal offices
Preceded by Willis E. Reed	Nebraska Attorney General; 1919–1923	Succeeded by Ora S. Spillman
