= Great Lakes Higher Education Corporation =

Great Lakes Higher Education Corporation was one of the largest student loan providers and guarantors in the United States. Headquartered in Madison, Wisconsin, the corporation is non-profit. It was one of the four largest companies which service United States federal student loans: Great Lakes, Nelnet, Navient, and the Pennsylvania Higher Education Assistance Agency. In 2018, the loan servicing part of the organization was sold to Nelnet.

The company sometimes gives education-related grants, with a focus on increasing access to higher education.

== Loan servicing ==
Great Lakes Educational Loan Services, Inc.
- Company type: Subsidiary
- Industry: Financial services
- Headquarters: Madison, Wisconsin, United States
- Products: Student loans
- Revenue: $230 million (2017)
- Number of employees: 1,800
- Parent: Nelnet
- Website: mygreatlakes.org

The former loan servicing arm of Great Lakes, the Great Lakes Educational Loan Services, Inc. guaranteed over $51 billion in loans under FFELP, and works with 6,000 schools, 1,100 lenders and 10,000,000 borrowers.

In order to replace their loan servicing contract with the United States Department of Education, which expired on June 16, 2019, Great Lakes decided in 2016 to make its bid for a new contract in cooperation with the competing student loan servicer, Nelnet. In October 2017, Great Lakes Higher Education Corporation reached an agreement to sell off 100% of the stock of its subsidiary, the Great Lakes Educational Loan Services, Inc. to Nelnet. The company was to be sold for $150 million, initially keeping CEO Jeff Crosby in charge, but with a plan of consolidating the companies together. On February 7, 2018, Nelnet announced that it had completed the acquisition of Great Lakes Educational Loan Services, Inc.. The loan servicing operation is now a fully owned subsidiary of Nelnet, the combined company now servicing 42% of the total federal student loan debt.
