= Paul L. Douglas =

American lawyer and politician

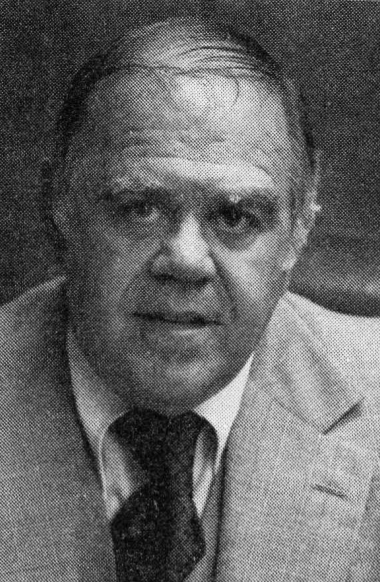

28th Nebraska Attorney General
- In office 1975–1984
- Governor: J. James Exon; Charles Thone; Bob Kerrey
- Preceded by: Clarence A. H. Meyer
- Succeeded by: Robert Spire

Personal details
- Born: September 19, 1927 Sioux Falls, South Dakota, U.S.
- Died: November 5, 2012 (aged 85) Lincoln, Nebraska, U.S.
- Education: Augustana University; University of Nebraska College of Law (JD)

Paul L. Douglas (September 19, 1927 – November 5, 2012) was an American lawyer and politician who served as Nebraska Attorney General from 1975 until his resignation in 1984.

== Early life and education ==
Douglas was born on September 19, 1927, in Sioux Falls, South Dakota. He enlisted in the United States Marine Corps and served two years during World War II, and later in the Korean War. Douglas attended Augustana University and the University of Nebraska College of Law.

== Career as prosecutor and state attorney general ==
Douglas was a local prosecutor in Lancaster County, Nebraska, until he was elected state attorney general in 1974. As a local prosecutor, Douglas was part of the prosecution team on the Charles Starkweather case. He took office as state AG in 1975, and was re-elected in 1978 and in 1982.

In 1984, Douglas was impeached by the Nebraska Legislature for "allegedly lying about his dealings with an insolvent bank (Commonwealth Savings Company of Lincoln) and failing to investigate the institution". He was the only Nebraska official impeached in the 20th century. In accordance with the Nebraska Constitution, the Nebraska Supreme Court conducted the impeachment trial; in a per curiam ruling issued in May 1984, the court found him not guilty, allowing him to remain in office.

Douglas was indicted in June 1984, and was tried in Lancaster County District Court. On December 14, 1984, he was acquitted of obstruction of governmental operations (a misdemeanor) but convicted of perjury (a felony). His law license was then suspended, and he resigned as state attorney general on December 27, 1984. Douglas maintained his innocence and said he would appeal the conviction, but said he resigned because he had always taken the position that an elected official should resign if convicted of a felony, saying, "I see no reason why it should not apply to me." His perjury conviction was overturned by the Nebraska Supreme Court in May 1986.

== Subsequent career ==
Douglas resumed his career as a lawyer, practicing as a sole practitioner in Lincoln, Nebraska, until his death. Among his clients were some Gage County officials sued in the Beatrice Six case. He died in Lincoln, on November 5, 2012, at the age of 85.

== Personal life ==
Douglas was married and was a member of the Greek Orthodox Church of the Annunciation in Lincoln.

Party political offices
Preceded by Clarence A. H. Meyer	Republican nominee for Nebraska Attorney General; 1974, 1978, 1982	Succeeded by Robert Spire
Legal offices
Preceded by Clarence A. H. Meyer	Attorney General of Nebraska; 1975–1984	Succeeded by Robert Spire
