= Doug Peterson (Nebraska politician) =

American politician (born 1959)

32nd Attorney General of Nebraska
- In office January 8, 2015 – January 5, 2023
- Governor: Pete Ricketts
- Preceded by: Jon Bruning
- Succeeded by: Mike Hilgers

Personal details
- Born: April 4, 1959 (age 67) Columbus, Nebraska, U.S.
- Party: Republican
- Education: University of Nebraska–Lincoln (BA); Pepperdine University (JD)

Douglas J. Peterson (born April 4, 1959) is an American lawyer and politician who was the 33rd attorney general of Nebraska. A Republican, Peterson was elected attorney general during the 2014 election and assumed office in January 2015.

== Biography ==
Peterson, who was born in Columbus, Nebraska, was raised in Lincoln, Nebraska. He graduated from the University of Nebraska–Lincoln in 1981 and earned a Juris Doctor from the Pepperdine University School of Law in 1985. Peterson worked for the district attorney of Lincoln County for two years until serving an additional two years as an assistant Nebraska attorney general to Robert M. Spire from 1988 until 1990. He entered private practice, where he would remain until his 2014 election as Attorney General of Nebraska.

Peterson was sworn in as the 33rd attorney general of Nebraska at the Nebraska State Capitol in Lincoln on January 8, 2015.

Peterson, who lives in Lincoln, is the nephew of former governor of Nebraska Val Peterson.

== Electoral history ==
Nebraska Attorney General Election, 2018
| Party | Candidate | Votes | % |
| Republican | Doug Peterson | 516,777 | 100.0 |

Nebraska Attorney General Republican Primary, May 13, 2014
| Party | Candidate | Votes | % |
|---|---|---|---|
| Republican | Doug Peterson | 67,578 | 35.65% |
| Republican | Brian C. Buescher | 48,316 | 25.49% |
| Republican | Mike Hilgers | 43,371 | 22.88% |
| Republican | Pete Pirsch | 30,321 | 15.99% |
| Plurality | | 19,262 | 10.16% |
| Total votes | | 189,586 | 100.00% |

Nebraska Attorney General Election, 2014
| Party | Candidate | Votes | % |
| Republican | Doug Peterson | 339,846 | 66.06 |
| Democratic | Janet Stewart | 174,614 | 33.94 |

Party political offices
| Preceded by Jon Bruning | Republican nominee for Attorney General of Nebraska; 2014, 2018 | Succeeded by Mike Hilgers |
Legal offices
| Preceded by Jon Bruning | Attorney General of Nebraska; 2015–2023 | Succeeded by Mike Hilgers |
