= Jim Scheer =

American politician (born 1953)

Member of the University of Nebraska Board of Regents from the 3rd district
- Incumbent
- Assumed office February 3, 2023
- Preceded by: Jim Pillen

Speaker of the Nebraska Legislature
- In office January 4, 2017 – January 6, 2021
- Preceded by: Galen Hadley
- Succeeded by: Mike Hilgers

Member of the Nebraska Legislature from the 19th district
- In office January 9, 2013 – January 6, 2021
- Preceded by: Mike Flood
- Succeeded by: Mike Flood

Personal details
- Born: September 19, 1953 (age 72) Norfolk, Nebraska, U.S.
- Party: Republican
- Education: University of Nebraska–Lincoln (BS)

Jim Scheer (born September 19, 1953) is an American politician who served as a Nebraska state senator in the unicameral Nebraska Legislature representing District 19; the legislature itself is non-partisan.

== Education ==
Scheer earned his BS in business administration from the University of Nebraska–Lincoln.

== Elections ==
In 2012, incumbent Mike Flood was termed out. Scheer placed first in the May primary election, with 4,497 votes. He won the November general election, receiving 10,441 votes to William Goodpasture's 3,014.

Political offices
Preceded by Galen Hadley	Speaker of the Nebraska Legislature; 2017–2021	Succeeded by Mike Hilgers
