= Richard C. Hunter =

American politician

Richard Charles Hunter
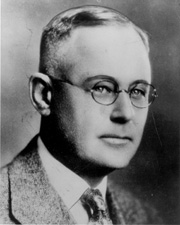

22nd Nebraska Attorney General
- In office 1937–1939
- Governor: Robert L. Cochran
- Preceded by: William H. Wright
- Succeeded by: Walter R. Johnson

United States Senator from Nebraska
- In office November 7, 1934 – January 3, 1935
- Preceded by: William H. Thompson
- Succeeded by: Edward R. Burke

Member of the Nebraska House of Representatives
- In office 1915-1917

Personal details
- Born: December 3, 1884 West Point, Nebraska, U.S.
- Died: January 23, 1941 (aged 56) Tucson, Arizona, U.S.
- Party: Democratic
- Spouse: Viletta G. Taylor (m. 1908-1937, her death)

Richard Charles Hunter (December 3, 1884 – January 23, 1941) was an American attorney and Democratic politician from Nebraska. He was most prominent for his service as a United States Senator (1934–1935) and as Nebraska's state attorney general (1937–1939).

== Biography ==
Hunter was born in West Point, Nebraska on December 3, 1884, the son of Jabez Richard Hunter and Sarah Frances (Olmstead) Hunter. His family moved to Omaha, Nebraska in 1885, and Hunter attended the Omaha public schools and graduated from Omaha High School in 1904.

He graduated from the University of Nebraska with a Bachelor of Arts degree in 1909. He attended Harvard Law School and received his LL.B. degree from Columbia Law School in 1911. Hunter was a member of Columbia's debate team in 1911, and was a member of the Delta Sigma Rho and Sigma Alpha Epsilon fraternities.

== Career ==
Hunter was admission to the bar and began to practice in Lincoln, Nebraska. He returned to Omaha in 1912, where he continued to practice law.

He served in the Nebraska House of Representatives and as judge of Omaha's Municipal Court from 1915 to 1917. He ran unsuccessfully for state Attorney General in 1920 and state Railway Commissioner in 1928.

Hunter was elected to the United States Senate in 1934 in a special election to serve out the final two months of the term of Robert B. Howell, who died in office. He was not a candidate for the regular election and served from November 7, 1934 to January 3, 1935. In 1936, he was the successful Democratic nominee for Nebraska Attorney General, and served from 1937 to 1939. To date, he remains the last Democratic Attorney General of the state.

== Death and burial ==
He died in Tucson, Arizona on January 23, 1941. He was buried at West Lawn Memorial Park in Omaha.

== Family ==
On April 22, 1908, Hunter married Viletta G. Taylor (1887–1937). They had no children.

== Sources ==
=== Books ===
- Baldwin, Sara Mullin; Baldwin, Robert Morton (1932). Nebraskana: Biographical Sketches of Nebraska Men and Women of Achievement who Have Been Awarded Life Membership in the Nebraskana Society. Vol. 2. Hebron, NE: The Baldwin Company. p. 589 – via NEGenWeb.

=== Newspapers ===
- "Rites Tuesday for R. C. Hunter". Evening State Journal. Lincoln, NE. January 24, 1941. p. 1 – via Newspapers.com.

Party political offices
Preceded by Richard Lee Metcalfe	Democratic nominee for U.S. Senator from Nebraska (Class 1); 1934 (special)	Succeeded by Edward R. Burke
U.S. Senate
Preceded by William H. Thompson	U.S. senator (Class 1) from Nebraska; 1934–1935; Served alongside: George W. Norris	Succeeded by Edward R. Burke
Legal offices
Preceded by William H. Wright	Attorney General of Nebraska; 1937–1939	Succeeded by Walter R. Johnson
