= Robert Spire =

American politician (1925–1994)

29th Nebraska Attorney General
- In office March 1, 1985 – January 9, 1991
- Governor: Bob Kerrey; Kay Orr
- Preceded by: Paul L. Douglas
- Succeeded by: Don Stenberg

Personal details
- Born: September 20, 1925 Omaha, Nebraska
- Died: March 3, 1994 (aged 68) Lincoln, Nebraska
- Party: Republican
- Education: Harvard University (B.A.); Harvard Law School (J.D.)

Military service
- Allegiance: United States
- Branch/service: United States Army
- Years of service: 1943–1946

Robert "Bob" M. Spire (September 20, 1925 – March 3, 1994) was a Republican politician from Nebraska who served as the Nebraska Attorney General from 1985 to 1991.

== Early career ==
Spire was born in Omaha, Nebraska, in 1953, and served in the United States Army from 1943 to 1946. He graduated from Harvard University in 1949 and from Harvard Law School in 1952. Spire returned to Omaha, and practiced law with the firm of Ellick, Spire & Jones until his appointment as Attorney General. He taught medical jurisprudence at the University of Nebraska Medical Center and served on the University of Nebraska Omaha Board of Regents from 1963 to 1968, and as the president of the board from 1966 to 1968. Spire served as the president of the Omaha Bar Association from 1978 to 1979 and of the Nebraska Bar Association from 1981 to 1982.

== Attorney General of Nebraska ==
In 1985, following the resignation of Attorney General Paul L. Douglas, Governor Bob Kerrey appointed Spire to serve out the remaining two years of Douglas's term. Kerrey's selection of Spire, a Republican, rather than a Democrat was controversial, and drew condemnation from the Nebraska Democratic Party, but Kerrey noted that he "had to make a judgment of conscience that was based upon what I thought would be in the best interest of all the people of the state of Nebraska." Spire was sworn in on March 1, 1985.

Spire ran for a full term in 1986. Though he considered running for re-election as a Democrat, he opted to run as a Republican, and was challenged in the Republican primary by Don Stenberg, the legal counsel to former Governor Charles Thone. Stenberg attacked Spire as a "liberal" and criticized him for not supporting law enforcement, while Spire argued that Stenberg was too partisan. Spire ultimately defeated Stenberg by a narrow margin, winning the primary just 53–47 percent.

In the general election, Spire was opposed by the Democratic nominee, former assistant U.S. Attorney Bernie Glaser, and both Kerrey and Stenberg endorsed Spire over Glaser. Spire ultimately defeated Glaser in a landslide, winning 61 percent of the vote to Glaser's 39 percent.

Spire declined to seek re-election in 1990, and was succeeded by Stenberg.

== Death ==
Spire died on March 3, 1994, following a heart attack.
