= James Hodson Anderson =

American politician and lawyer

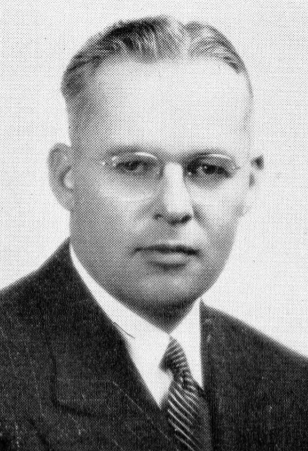

24th Attorney General of Nebraska
- In office 1949–1950
- Governor: Val Peterson
- Preceded by: Walter R. Johnson
- Succeeded by: Clarence S. Beck

Personal details
- Born: August 4, 1909 Minden, Nebraska
- Died: August 17, 1996 (aged 87) Omaha, Nebraska
- Party: Republican

James Hodson Anderson (August 4, 1909 – August 17, 1996) was an American politician and lawyer. He was elected Nebraska Attorney General in 1948. He resigned the position in March 1950.

== Union Pacific Railroad ==
After his time as the Attorney General of Nebraska, he became an important counsel for the Union Pacific Railroad Company. In this capacity he represented the Union Pacific in many legal cases before courts such as the U.S. District Court for the Southern District of Iowa and the US Court of Appeals for the Seventh Circuit among others.

As a counsel for the Union Pacific, he was called on to represent the company before the United States Supreme Court as well. In one such case, United States v. Union Pacific R. Co. – argued from January 23, 1957 and decided on April 8, 1957 – he had on his legal team, Warren M. Christopher, who would later serve as US Secretary of State. Representing the United States as opposing counsel was U.S. Solicitor General James Lee Rankin, along with a team of lawyers that assisted him. Six years later James Rankin would be appointed General Counsel on the Warren Commission.
