= Mike Hilgers =

American politician (born 1978)

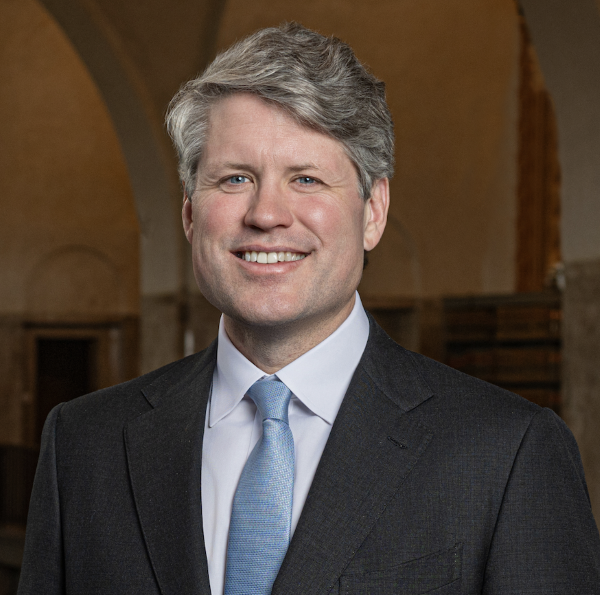
- Hilgers in 2026

33rd Attorney General of Nebraska
- Incumbent
- Assumed office January 5, 2023
- Governor: Jim Pillen
- Preceded by: Doug Peterson

Speaker of the Nebraska Legislature
- In office January 6, 2021 – January 4, 2023
- Preceded by: Jim Scheer
- Succeeded by: John Arch

Chair of the Executive Board of the Nebraska Legislature
- In office January 9, 2019 – January 6, 2021
- Preceded by: Dan Watermeier
- Succeeded by: Dan Hughes

Member of the Nebraska Legislature from the 21st district
- In office January 4, 2017 – January 4, 2023
- Preceded by: Ken Haar
- Succeeded by: Beau Ballard

Personal details
- Born: Michael Thomas Hilgers; October 25, 1978 (age 47) Omaha, Nebraska, U.S.
- Party: Republican
- Spouse: Heather
- Children: 4
- Education: Baylor University (BA); University of Chicago (JD)
- Website: Campaign website

Michael Thomas Hilgers Sr. (born October 25, 1978) is an American businessman, lawyer and politician who is the Nebraska Attorney General. He previously served as a Republican member of the Nebraska Legislature, representing the 21st district from 2017 to 2023. Hilgers was the speaker of the Nebraska Legislature from 2021 to 2023.

== Early life ==
Hilgers was born in Omaha, Nebraska. He graduated from Omaha Creighton Preparatory School in 1997. He obtained an economics degree from Baylor University in 2001.

== Legal and business career ==
Hilgers graduated from the University of Chicago Law School, where he was an editor on the Law Review. After graduating from law school, he served as a judicial clerk for the Edith Brown Clement, senior judge of the United States Court of Appeals for the Fifth Circuit. He worked at the International Intellectual Property Law firm of Fish & Richardson P.C., before moving back home to Lincoln.

Hilgers is the founder of the law firm Hilgers Graben, which he started building in his basement. The law firm was named to Inc. magazine's list of fastest 5000 growing companies in the country three years in a row. In 2018 the magazine named it the fastest growing private company in Lincoln.

== 2012 State Legislature campaign ==
In 2012, Hilgers challenged incumbent Senator Ken Haar for the State Legislature, District 21. He came in second in the primary campaign with 2,238 votes (46.2%) behind Ken Haar's 2,471 votes (51%) and ahead of Bryan C. Ifland's 134 votes (2.8%). Hilgers lost the general election with 6,784 votes (49.7%), 85 votes behind Ken Haar's 6,869 votes (50.3%).

== 2014 Attorney General campaign ==
In 2014, Hilgers ran for election to be Nebraska's Attorney General. He lost the primary campaign with 43,371 votes (22.9%) behind Doug Peterson's 67,578 votes (35.6%) and Brian Buecher's 48,316 votes (25.5%) and ahead of Pete Pirsch's 30,321 votes (16%).

== Nebraska State Legislature (2017-2023) ==
=== Elections ===
==== 2016 State Legislature campaign ====
In 2016, Hilgers ran for election to the State Legislature, District 21. He won the primary campaign with 3,053 votes (53.4%) ahead of Larry Scherer's 1,936 votes (33.8%) and Rick Vest's 732 votes (12.8%). He won the general election campaign with 8,588 votes (56.7%) compared to Larry Scherer's 6,567 votes (43.3%).

==== 2020 State Legislature campaign ====
In 2020, Hilgers ran for re-election to the State Legislature, District 21. He won the primary campaign with 5,150 votes (59.1%) ahead of Brodey Weber's 2,379 votes (27.3%) and Joseph Couch's 1,184 votes (13.6%). He won re-election with 10,157 votes (55%) to Brodey Weber's 8,325 (45%).

=== Tenure ===
==== Speaker (107th Legislature) ====
Hilgers was elected Speaker for the 107th Legislature by acclamation. He was the first Speaker from Lincoln since 1977–78.

==== Expedited construction of the South Beltway (LB616) ====
In 2019, Hilgers introduced and prioritized LB616, a bill to accelerate construction of the “long-awaited South Beltway, reducing its completion timetable from eight to three years.” In addition to accelerating the timetable for completion the bill was estimated to save $25 million in construction costs. The bill passed 48–0. As of May 2021, the South Beltway was on track to be finished on its expedited schedule.

==== Expansion of direct primary care (LB1119) ====
In 2018, he prioritized LB1119, Senator Riepe's bill to expand direct primary care in Nebraska. The bill passed on final reading.

==== Expansion of broadband (LB388) ====
In 2021, he prioritized LB388, a bill introduced at the request of Governor Ricketts to expand high-speed broadband to 30,000 households around the State of Nebraska. The bill passed 49–0.

==== Streamlining road construction (LB271) ====
Hilgers introduced in 2017 LB271, which cut red tape in the construction of certain larger highway construction projects. LB271 was estimated to cut $19 million annually by allowing the state to take over certain environmental reviews. The Norfolk Daily News called it a “wise idea” for roads construction. The bill was prioritized by fellow Lincoln senator, Senator Geist, and passed 48–0.

=== Committee Assignments ===
For the 105th and 106th Legislatures, Hilgers was a member of the Transportation and Telecommunications Committee as well as the Government, Military, and Veterans Affairs Committee.

Hilgers was elected the Chairman of the Rules Committee for the 105th Legislature.

Hilgers was elected the Chairman of the executive board of the Legislative Council for the 106th Legislature.

For the 107th Legislature, he serves as a member of the executive board, Legislative Performance Audit, Planning, and Reference Committees. As speaker, he is an ex officio member of the Rules Committee.

He also served as the Chairman of the State Tourism and Recreation Water Access Resources (STAR WARS) Special Committee, created by LB406, which was intended to study transformative water and tourism projects around the state of Nebraska.

== Nebraska Attorney General (2023–present) ==
=== Elections ===
==== 2022 Attorney General campaign ====
In 2022, Hilgers ran for election to be the Nebraska Attorney General. He won with 434,671 votes, beating Larry Bolinger of the Legal Marijuana Now Party's 188,649 votes.

==== 2026 Attorney General campaign ====
Hilgers is currently running for reelection. He won the Republican nomination unopposed, and will face Jocelyn Brasher of the Democratic Party.

=== Tenure ===
Hilgers led a group of GOP attorneys general by taking legal action against the Biden administration for putting emission limits on trucks. The Trump administration would later rescind the previous administration's EPA regulation.

Hilgers has opposed medical marijuana. He challenged the Trump Justice Department's order over reclassifying marijuana from a Schedule 1 to Schedule 3 drug. He has also criticized legislative efforts from those within his own party who have tried passing regulatory framework regarding the issue.

In March 2026, Hilgers launched a major consumer protection and child safety lawsuit against Roblox. He alleged that Roblox had detailed knowledge of widespread child exploitation on their platform, and failed to implement safeguards in place that put millions of children at risk to sexual predators.

== Personal life ==
He lives in Lincoln, Nebraska, with his wife Heather, and four children – Alice, Elsie, Clara Jane, and Michael Jr.

Nebraska Legislature
Preceded by Dan Watermeier	Chair of the Executive Board of the Nebraska Legislature; 2019–2021	Succeeded by Dan Hughes
Political offices
Preceded by Jim Scheer	Speaker of the Nebraska Legislature; 2021–2023	Succeeded by John Arch
Party political offices
Preceded by Doug Peterson	Republican nominee for Attorney General of Nebraska; 2022, 2026	Most recent
Legal offices
Preceded by Doug Peterson	Attorney General of Nebraska; 2023–present	Incumbent
