= Jon Bruning =

31st Attorney General of Nebraska

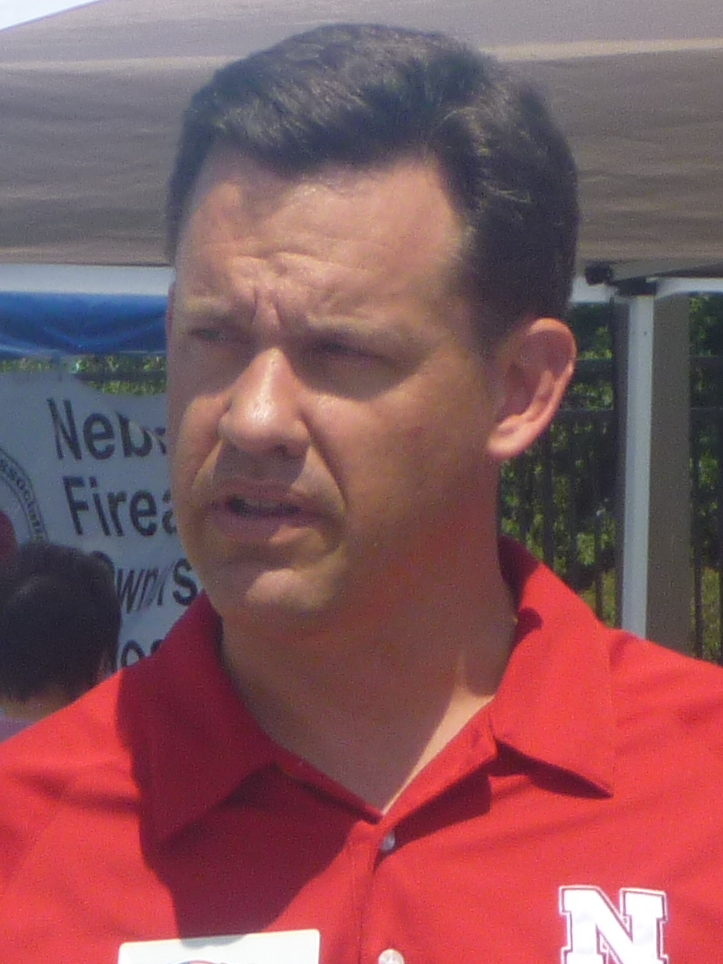
- Bruning in 2011

31st Attorney General of Nebraska
- In office January 3, 2003 – January 8, 2015
- Governor: Mike Johanns; Dave Heineman
- Preceded by: Don Stenberg
- Succeeded by: Doug Peterson

Member of the Nebraska Legislature from the 3rd district
- In office January 8, 1997 – November 6, 2002
- Preceded by: Michael T. Avery
- Succeeded by: Ray Mossey

Personal details
- Born: April 30, 1969 (age 57) Lincoln, Nebraska, U.S.
- Party: Republican
- Education: University of Nebraska–Lincoln

Jon Cumberland Bruning (born April 30, 1969) is an American politician who served as the 32nd Attorney General of Nebraska from 2003 to 2015. A member of the Republican Party, he previously represented the 3rd district in the Nebraska Legislature from 1997 until 2003. He was a candidate in the 2012 United States Senate election in Nebraska, losing the Republican nomination to Deb Fischer and in the 2014 Nebraska gubernatorial election, also losing the nomination to Pete Ricketts.

== Early life, education and legal career ==
Bruning was born and raised in Lincoln, Nebraska, a fifth generation Nebraskan, and graduated from Lincoln Southeast High School. After high school, Bruning went on to the University of Nebraska–Lincoln where he received a bachelor's degree in 1990 with High Distinction. Bruning was a member of Phi Beta Kappa and the Innocents Society, a senior honor society at Nebraska that honors 13 seniors for leadership, scholarship and service. After completing his undergraduate studies, Bruning attended the University of Nebraska College of Law, where he received his Juris Doctor in 1994.

In 1995, Bruning married Deonne Niemack; the couple has two children, Lauren and Jack.

Bruning served as general counsel for Vital Learning Corporation from 1995 to 1997.

== Political career ==
=== Nebraska Legislature ===
Bruning ran to represent the 3rd district of the Nebraska Legislature in 1996. He defeated incumbent Michael T. Avery 55%–44%. He was the youngest member of the legislature. In 1998, he sponsored a bill that would extend loans to college students in order to encourage them to stay in the state. He won re-election in 2000 unopposed. He resigned from the Legislature on November 6, 2002, immediately prior to a special legislative session to consider changes to the state's death penalty laws, citing his desire to avoid any conflict of interest following his election as Attorney General.

=== Attorney General ===
Bruning was elected Attorney General of Nebraska in 2002 with 66% of the vote, becoming the youngest attorney general in the country at the time, and the youngest in Nebraska history. He won reelection unopposed in 2006 and 2010.

In 2004, he worked with the Nebraska Legislature to create Nebraska's Medicaid Fraud Unit. The Medicaid Fraud Unit recovered more than $20 million in 2012 and nearly $68 million since 2004.

In 2005, Bruning launched a criminal probe of University of Nebraska Regent David Hergert related to campaign finances. In the same year, he charged a 20-year-old man with rape after his 14-year-old wife became pregnant.

He served as President of the National Association of Attorneys General from 2009 to 2010. He traveled to Iraq as President of the National Association of Attorneys General (NAAG) and signed training agreement with Iraq Jurists Union.

During a speech in August 2011, Bruning compared welfare recipients to raccoons. Bruning said his comment might have been "inartful" but that he was trying to make a point about spending cuts being necessary.

In August 2011, the Omaha World-Herald reported that Bruning had purchased a lakeside house valued at $675,000 near the Platte River in partnership with two Nelnet executives, almost a year after he and his office had been accused of acting favorably toward the student loan company by not enforcing payment of a $1 million judgment awarded to the State of Nebraska when Nelnet was under fire for alleged improper business practices.

In 2012, Bruning sued the Federal government of the United States over the Patient Protection and Affordable Care Act with a 26 state coalition. His office led the legal challenge to the federal Patient Protection and Affordable Care Act's provision regarding employer-paid health insurance requirements related to abortion.

In 2013, Bruning was fined a $19,000 civil penalty by the Federal Election Commission for campaign finance violations during his 2012 U.S. Senate election effort.

In late 2014, Bruning, together with Oklahoma Attorney General Scott Pruitt, filed a suit in the Supreme Court of the United States in which they asked that Colorado's Amendment 64, which legalized marijuana in that state, be struck down. Bruning and Pruitt argued that the Colorado measure violated the Supremacy Clause of the U.S. Constitution, since the U.S. Congress had enacted the 1970 Controlled Substances Act, which imposed a nationwide ban on marijuana. In connection with the suit, Bruning declared that marijuana was a "gateway drug that is a detriment to society" and that "I don't want it to be a legal option for my children or your option or anyone's children in this state or in this country."

Bruning left office as Nebraska Attorney General with the inauguration of his successor, Doug Peterson, on January 8, 2015.

=== U.S. Senate and gubernatorial elections ===
In 2007, Bruning entered the race for the U.S. Senate seat then held by Chuck Hagel, and raised more than $1 million for his campaign. Later that year, however, Hagel announced that he would not seek reelection; soon thereafter, former Nebraska Governor Mike Johanns joined the race for the now-open seat. Faced with an overwhelming likelihood that Johanns would win the Republican primary, Bruning withdrew from the campaign almost a year before the election.

In late 2010, Bruning announced that he would run in the 2012 election for the U.S. Senate seat held by Democrat Ben Nelson, whose approval ratings in Nebraska had plummeted after he provided the 60th and final vote necessary to break a Republican filibuster and pass the Patient Protection and Affordable Care Act. In December 2011, Nelson announced that he would not seek reelection. Bruning was seen as the strong front-runner in the Republican primary race; former Attorney General and current State Treasurer Don Stenberg, favored by the conservative Tea Party movement, was seen as his strongest challenger. Bruning and Stenberg attacked one another aggressively throughout the campaign. Shortly before the election, the political action committee Ending Spending, financed by Omaha businessman Joe Ricketts, ran a television ad attacking Bruning for buying a lake house together with two executives of Lincoln student-loan firm Nelnet less than a year after Bruning, in his capacity as attorney general, had sought to waive a $1 million penalty against the company. In the primary election, voters delivered an unexpected victory to dark-horse candidate Deb Fischer, who won 41% of the vote to Bruning's 36% and Stenberg's 19%.

In 2014, Governor Dave Heineman was barred by Nebraska's term-limits law from running for a third consecutive term. In February of that year, Bruning announced that he would seek the governorship, joining the five candidates who had already declared. His entry into the race, although it came late, made him the perceived front-runner, supplanting Omaha businessman Pete Ricketts. In the course of the campaign, two groups that declined to name their donors purchased $1.3 million in television ads attacking Bruning, who accused Ricketts and his father Joe Ricketts of funding the groups, charges which Ricketts denied. Ricketts won the primary election, with 26.6% of the vote to Bruning's 25.5%; State Senator Beau McCoy received 20.9% and State Auditor Mike Foley 19.2%.

== Electoral history ==
1996 Nebraska Legislature Election, State Senate District 3
Candidate	Votes	%
Jon Bruning	6,361	55.32
Michael T. Avery	5,105	44.4

Nebraska Attorney General Election, 2002
Party	Candidate	Votes	%
Republican	Jon Bruning	292,673	66.07
Democratic	Mike Meister	150,286	33.93

Nebraska U.S. Senate Election 2012 – Republican Primary
Party	Candidate	Votes	%
Republican	Deb Fischer	79,941	41.0
Republican	Jon Bruning	70,067	35.9
Republican	Don Stenberg	36,727	18.8
Republican	Pat Flynn	5,413	2.8
Republican	Spencer Zimmerman	1,601	0.8
Republican	Sharyn Elander	1,294	0.7
Total votes		195,043	100

Party political offices
Preceded by Don Stenberg	Republican nominee for Nebraska Attorney General; 2002, 2006, 2010	Succeeded by Doug Peterson
