= Nebraska Attorney General =

Attorney general for the U.S. state of Nebraska

Attorney General of Nebraska
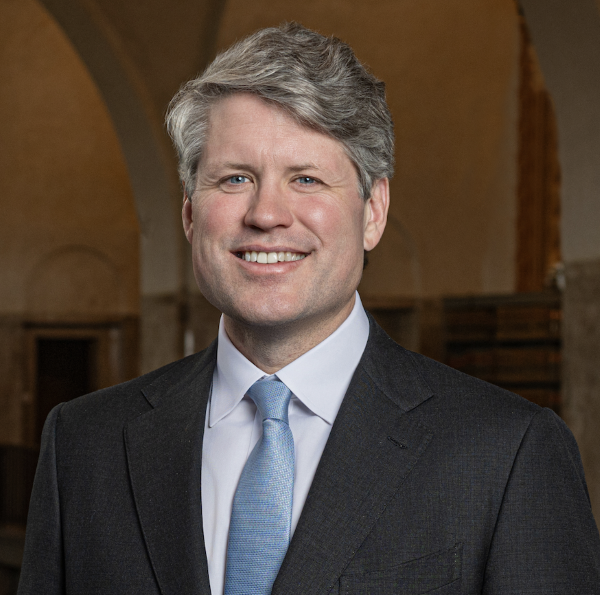
- Incumbent; Mike Hilgers since January 5, 2023
- Type: Chief legal officer
- Seat: Lincoln
- Term length: 4 years
- Formation: February 21, 1867
- First holder: Champion Chase
- Website: Nebraska Attorney General official website

The Nebraska attorney general is the chief law enforcement officer and lawyer for the U.S. state of Nebraska. The attorney general also serves as the head of the Nebraska Department of Justice. The attorney general as head of the Nebraska Justice Department has "general control and supervision of all actions and legal proceedings in which the State of Nebraska may be a party or be interested, and has charge and control of all legal business of all departments and bureaus of the state... which requires the services of attorney or counsel in order to protect interests of the state."

== History ==
=== Territorial ===
The 1915 Nebraska Blue Book states that "The genesis of the office of the attorney general of Nebraska is obscure and a matter of some controversy." The Kansas–Nebraska Act, which created the Territory of Nebraska, provided for a U.S. Attorney for the territory to be appointed by the President. In his message to the territorial legislature on January 6, 1857, Territorial Governor Mark W. Izard referred to this office as that of "attorney general," and other sources also refer to the territorial U.S. attorneys from that time as the "attorney general" of the territory. On February 4, 1857, the territorial legislature passed an act "for the relief of Experience Estabrook," the first U.S. attorney for Nebraska territory, to grant $100 from the territorial treasury for his services in prosecuting cases for the territory. Thus, the 1915 blue book concludes, at least in part, that "It would appear... that the attorney for the territory and the attorney general were the same."

However, on January 23, 1856, the territorial legislature passed a bill providing for the election of "one Attorney General," among other officers. Thus, on May 30, 1857, Territorial Governor Mark Izard called for an election on August 3, 1857. At this election, Charles F. Grant, the first city attorney for Omaha, Nebraska, was elected as attorney general for Nebraska Territory. Grant served in this position for only about a year when the territorial legislature decided to abolish the office of territorial attorney general. A bill entitled "An act to abolish the office of Attorney-General," which gave the duties of the office to the district attorneys, was passed on October 12, 1858, and signed by Territorial Governor William Alexander Richardson on October 18, 1858.

=== State ===
The first Nebraska Constitution of 1866 did not provide for the office of an attorney general. Instead, the office of attorney for the State of Nebraska was provided for by the Nebraska Legislature by statutes dated June 21, 1867, and later February 9, 1869, to be appointed by the Governor of Nebraska. Thus, Nebraska Governor David Butler appointed the first two attorneys general of the state, Champion S. Chase and Seth Robinson.

On February 15, 1869, the Nebraska Legislature changed the law so that the attorney general would be elected every two years, just like the state's constitutional officers, instead of being appointed by the governor. This law took effect for the first time in the election of 1870, in which George H. Roberts became Nebraska's first elected attorney general. In 1873, in his address to the Nebraska Legislature, acting Nebraska governor William H. James noted that "The office of attorney-general is unknown to the constitution, and exists only under and by virtue of legislative enactment." He recommended that the office be abolished, a recommendation the legislature did not act on.

In 1875, voters replaced the Nebraska Constitution of 1866 with the Nebraska Constitution of 1875, which remains Nebraska's constitution today. This constitution elevated the office of attorney general from a statutory office to a constitutional office, on par with Nebraska's other constitutional offices, to be elected every two years. In 1919, the Nebraska Legislature created the Nebraska Department of Justice, to be administered by the attorney general. In 1964, voters approved a constitutional amendment which changed the term of the attorney general (as well as all other constitutional officers of Nebraska) from two to four years beginning with the election of 1966.

== List of territorial attorneys ==
=== U.S. Attorneys ===
#	Image	Territorial U.S. Attorney	Term	Party
1		Experience Estabrook	1854–1859	Democratic
2		Leavitt L. Bowen	1859–1860	Democratic
3		Robert A. Howard	1860–1861	Democratic
4		David L. Collier	1861–1864	Republican
5		Daniel Gantt	1864–1867	Republican

=== Attorney General ===
#	Image	Territorial Attorney General	Term	Party
1		Charles F. Grant	1857–1858	Unknown

== List of attorneys general ==
Parties

Republican (26) Democratic (6) Fusion (Democratic/Populist) (1)

#	Image	Attorney General	Term	Party
1		Champion S. Chase (Note: Appointed by Governor David Butler. The current Nebraska Blue Book and blue books since 1899 have stated that his term began on February 21, 1867, when the constitutional officers of Nebraska took office; however, this appears unlikely since the statute creating the position of state attorney and later attorney general for Nebraska was not passed by the legislature until June 21, 1867, and newspapers of the time do not report the governor appointing anyone to that office until September 1867.)	1867–1869	Republican
2		Seth Robinson (Note: Appointed by Governor David Butler.)	1869–1871	Republican
3		George H. Roberts	1871–1873	Republican
4		Joseph R. Webster	1873–1875	Republican
–		George H. Roberts	1875–1879	Republican
5		Caleb J. Dilworth	1879–1883	Republican
6		Isaac Powers, Jr.	1883–1885	Republican
7		William Leese	1885–1891	Republican
8		George H. Hastings	1891–1895	Republican
9		Arthur S. Churchill	1895–1897	Republican
10		Constantine J. Smyth	1897–1901	Fusion (Note: Joint Populist-Democratic ticket.)
11		Frank N. Prout	1901–1905	Republican
12		Norris Brown	1905–1907	Republican
13		William T. Thompson (Note: Resigned after being appointed Solicitor of the United States Treasury by President William Howard Taft.)	1907–1910	Republican
14		Arthur F. Mullen (Note: Appointed by Governor Ashton Shallenberger to fill vacancy. In office October 31, 1910, to January 5, 1911.)	1910–1911	Democratic
15		Grant G. Martin	1911–1915	Republican
16		Willis E. Reed	1915–1919	Democratic
17		Clarence A. Davis	1919–1923	Republican
18		Ora S. Spillman	1923–1929	Republican
19		Christian A. Sorensen	1929–1933	Republican
20		Paul F. Good	1933–1935	Democratic
21		William H. Wright	1935–1937	Democratic
22		Richard C. Hunter	1937–1939	Democratic
23		Walter R. Johnson	1939–1949	Republican
24		James H. Anderson (Note: Resigned to become counsel for Union Pacific Railroad Company.)	1949–1950	Republican
25		Clarence S. Beck (Note: Appointed by Governor Val Peterson to fill vacancy on March 1, 1950; elected in November 1950.)	1950–1951	Republican
26		Harold P. Caldwell (Note: Caldwell was elected in a special election to fill the vacancy created by the resignation of James H. Anderson. Although the governor had appointed Clarence S. Beck to the post, Caldwell argued that it was still a vacancy to be filled by a special election, since the governor's appointee could only hold office "until the next election." Since no other candidates filed to run to fill the short-term vacancy, Caldwell was elected, but his election was disputed. Caldwell argued that he should take office immediately upon the vote being certified on November 27, 1950, whereas Beck argued that Caldwell couldn't take office until the Nebraska Legislature canvassed the result on January 2, 1951. The Nebraska Supreme Court heard the dispute on December 2, 1950, and sided with Beck that Caldwell could not take office until the Legislature canvassed the vote. Caldwell became attorney general on January 2, 1951, after the Legislature had canvassed the vote. He only served in office about 31 hours until midnight on January 4, 1951, when Beck was reinstated pursuant to Nebraska Constitution Article XVII, Section 5.)	1951 (one day)	Democratic
–		Clarence S. Beck (Note: Originally appointed in March 1950 and elected to a full term in November 1950, Beck took the office back on January 4, 1951, after Harold P. Caldwell occupied it for roughly 31 hours.)	1951–1961	Republican
27		Clarence A. H. Meyer	1961–1975	Republican
28		Paul L. Douglas (Note: Resigned after being convicted of perjury. His conviction was later overturned.)	1975–1984	Republican
–	Acting	Patrick O'Brien (Note: O'Brien was named acting attorney general by Governor Bob Kerrey after Douglas resigned. He served from January 1, 1985, to January 5, 1985.)	1985	Republican
–	Acting	Eugene Crump (Note: Crump was named acting attorney general by Governor Bob Kerrey at the request of incoming attorney general appointee Robert Spire to manage the office from January 5, 1985, until Spire took office on March 1, 1985.)	1985	Democratic
29		Robert Spire (Note: Appointed by Governor Bob Kerrey to fill vacancy. Sworn in on March 1, 1985; elected in 1986.)	1985–1991	Republican
30		Don Stenberg	1991–2003	Republican
31		Jon Bruning	2003–2015	Republican
32		Doug Peterson	2015–2023	Republican
33		Mike Hilgers	2023–present	Republican
