= Eleanor Sophia Smith =

American composer and music educator

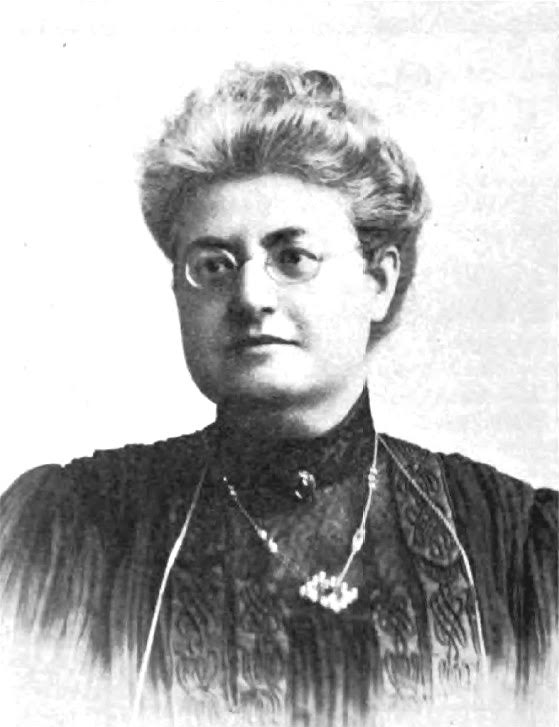
- Born: June 15, 1858; Atlanta, Illinois, U.S.
- Died: June 30, 1942 (aged 84); Midland, Michigan, U.S.
- Occupations: Music instructor and composer
- Years active: 1880s–1936
- Known for: Hull House Music School

Eleanor Sophia Smith (June 15, 1858 – June 30, 1942) was an American composer and music educator. She was one of the founders of Chicago's Hull House Music School, and headed its music department from 1893 to 1936.

Born into a musical family, Smith taught herself to play the piano and later became a classically trained musician. Earning a teaching degree, she began publishing music compositions for children using the philosophy of Friedrich Fröbel, advocating for less memorization and drilling and more attention to intuitive appreciation of music. Studying composition and voice in Germany, she also toured the country observing choirs and their teaching techniques.

Returning to the United States in 1890, Smith began working at the settlement house, Hull House, as a music instructor. Within three years she had co-founded the Hull House Music School, a school which followed her progressive teaching ideas, cross-training students in vocal music as well as instruments. Simultaneously, she worked in several institutions in the Chicago area which trained music educators.

Smith published numerous compilations of songs, including two six-volume textbook series, which were widely used throughout the United States. Most of her writings were focused on children's voices and contained short songs written with attention paid to the limited range and short attention span of children. Many of her compositions were still being used in music education programs in the latter part of the 20th century.

== Early years and education ==
Born in Atlanta, Illinois, in 1858, Eleanor was the daughter of Willard Newton and Matilda (Jaspersen) Smith. She came from a musical family, as her father was a noted bass in the First Presbyterian Church Choir in Chicago between 1860 and 1871. In an interview she gave in 1908, Smith claimed that both sides of her family were musical, noting that a paternal great-grandfather composed hymns and that her maternal line was a musical mix of Danish, French, German, and Jewish ancestry. Smith taught herself to play the piano and did not begin any formal training for voice or composition until she was eighteen years old. She had very poor vision, which limited her ability to use her eyes for long periods of time. She studied at the Hershey School of Musical Art and published her first cantata, "The Golden Asp", while still a student there. She later graduated from Cook County Normal School, but continued to study music privately as a pupil of Frances A. Root (voice) and Frederick Grant Gleason (composition).

== Career ==
After completing her schooling, Smith commenced teaching at the Cook County Normal School for a few years before moving to Germany to continue her studies. She went to Berlin in 1887, where she studied with Moritz Moszkowski (composition), Julius Hey (voice), and Ludwig Bussler for three years. While she was in Germany, she traveled through the country observing choirs where she could obtain permission to do so. In some instances, she was not allowed to observe or be seen, as her presence was deemed improper in groups composed of only male performers or students. While in Berlin, she and friends discussed the benefits of teaching where students were cross-trained in both piano and voice, which would be advantageous to both. Such study would prevent pianists from losing the melodic focus and being overly technical; additionally, singers would gain technique rather than focusing solely on performance. As early as 1885, she was publishing songs and collaborating with poets for lyrics, including such works as "Cradle Song", "A Million Little Diamonds", "Only Thine Own Mine Art", "The Quest" and "She Kisses with her Eyes". Smith gained a reputation as a songwriter by the early 1890s and many of her works were translated into German during this period. She also wrote hymns, though they may have remained in manuscript.

=== Composition ===
Smith began publishing for children in 1887, with her first volume of children's music entitled Songs for Little Children, Part 1. She was a proponent and follower of the teaching philosophy of Friedrich Fröbel. Smith incorporated Fröbel's ideas that childhood is a universal experience in which children learn by imitation, using their natural abilities. Her compositions also recognized that children learn by movement and play, but have limited attention spans. Thus, the compositions she created were usually short melodies with limited vocal ranges that were easy to sing. The songs were in major keys- typically C, F, and G- and extended only from C4 to F5. She composed most of her melodies as stepped triads and provided pauses for activity. For example, in her song "The Wind Mill" there is an eight measure rest for the children to make the motions of the turning blades.

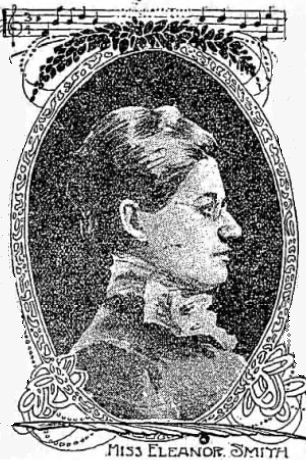
Eleanor Smith, 1901 newspaper photo from the article about her music for Morris Rosenfeld's poem "Sweat Shop"

In 1894, after Smith returned from Germany, she published her second volume Songs for Little Children, Part 2. As in her previous work, most of the songs were in major keys, with the most common being A-flat major and E-flat major. Second, third, fourth and fifth intervals were typical in her voice scores with the piano accompaniment creating interest through varied rhythm patterns. In this volume, most of the compositions were Smith's own work, though some of the pieces were adaptations of German folk songs.

Smith's first textbook series, The Modem Music Series, in six volumes was published in 1898 by Scott, Foresman and Company, with rights later purchased by the Silver Burdette Company. It was a collaboration with Robert Foresman, another music educator who believed that children should be allowed to learn intuitively. It set forth a new movement in music instruction which rejected the traditional sight singing memorization method of training and instead relied on the "song method". In this type of instruction, students learned the skills for reading music from a combination of interval recognition, ear training and observation of songs. The books were successful, using many of Smith's own songs and became the basis for similar textbooks based on her ideas and works, such as the publication in 1909 by Charles H. Congdon called the Congdon Music Readers series, which incorporated 21 songs by Smith. Smith published a second textbook series, The Eleanor Smith Music Series, in 1908, which also contained six volumes and was widely distributed in US public schools.

In 1910, Smith published Songs of a Little Child’s Day, which included 66 songs of original compositions by Smith and text by Emilie Poulsson. The songs focused on a limited range to make it easy for high-pitched children's voices to sing the works and most of the songs contained sixteen bars or less. Accompaniment lines for the piano duplicated the vocal lines, but had artistic flourishes, such as a section in the piece "The Busy Wind", which used a repetitive pattern of sixteenth notes to imitate the sound of blowing wind. In honor of the 25th anniversary of Hull House, in 1915, five of Smith's compositions were published as The Hull-House Songs. The themes represented social issues which were prevalent at the time, including "The Land of the Noonday Night" about mining safety, the "Suffrage Song" about women's voting rights, and "The Shadow Child" about child labor, with words penned by poet Harriet Monroe. As early as 1901, she wrote compositions for poems with social themes, such as the work she created for Morris Rosenfeld's poem "Sweat Shop". Other works Smith authored include: "Song Pictures"; "Twelve Songs for Twelve Boys"; "The Golden Asp" (cantata); "Wedding Music" (No. 1 and No. 2); "Trolls' Holiday" (operetta); and "Twelve Songs". Her works continued to be popular into the 1980s, attesting to the quality of their composition.

=== Teaching ===
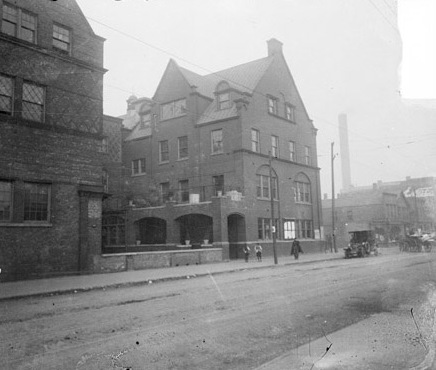
Hull House

Smith arrived at Hull House in the autumn of 1890 and, shortly after her first visit, began to give voice and piano lessons to both children and adults. Initially, free concerts were given on Sunday, both to uplift the community and to highlight the talents of the settlement house teachers and musicians. Between November 1891 and April 1892, there were 22 Sunday concerts held at Hull House before the music school was officially founded. Smith was one of the founders of Hull House Music School the following year, which became the first settlement music school in the United States. She invited one of her friends from Germany, Amalie Hannig, who had been teaching piano at the Klindworth Conservatory to help her with the school. Hannig taught both piano and voice at the school until 1898. Mary Rozet Smith, one of the benefactors of Hull House, provided the funding to establish the school.

In the late 1890s, Jane Addams and Smith had a disagreement over Hull House's Sunday concerts. Smith, a classically trained musician, felt that the purpose of the events should be to present educationally challenging programs. Addams, however, felt that the programs should feature more popular music to promote Hull House and recruit broad audiences to experience the environment which the settlement house offered. They finally reached a compromise at the turn of the decade, with Sunday concerts featuring music with popular appeal and weekday evening programs focusing on more challenging material. However, the disagreement over content ultimately lead to Smith's resignation in 1901. Though Addams did not relent on the Sunday content, she was able to persuade Smith to remain otherwise.

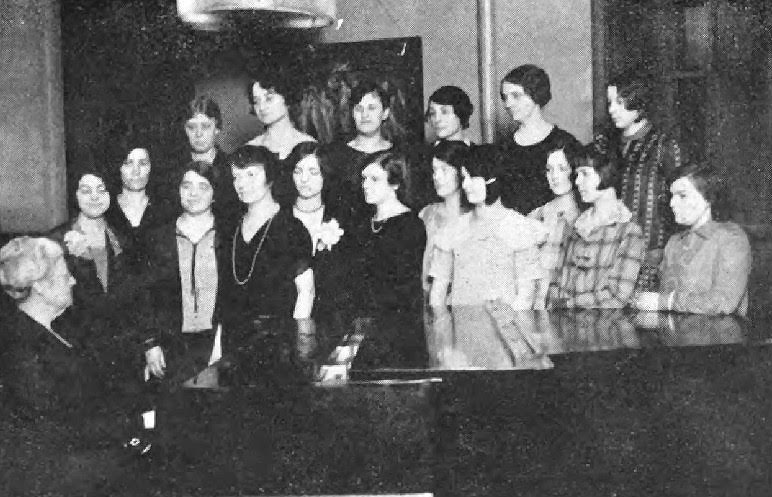
Smith's singing class at Hull House in 1929. Pictured seated at the piano.

Smith's teaching style differed from conventional music instruction at the time in that she required instrumental students to study voice. Piano, organ and violin instruction was offered by 1907. Gertrude Madeira Smith, Eleanor's sister, gave organ instruction and Charles Moerenhout of the Chicago Orchestra taught violin. Five assistants also helped the teachers. Smith felt that adding vocal training gave a level of experience that was neglected by singular focus on memorization of scales and structural drills usually prevalent for those learning instruments. She also incorporated songs from the students' homelands as a way to intermingle their old cultures with their new lives and made efforts to involve their parents in the development of the curricula. As a progressive reformer, Smith advocated that inclusive diversity was a means of building a cosmopolitan citizenry united by pursuit of music excellence. She also encouraged students to compose music from their earliest instruction and to recover songs from their cultural backgrounds.

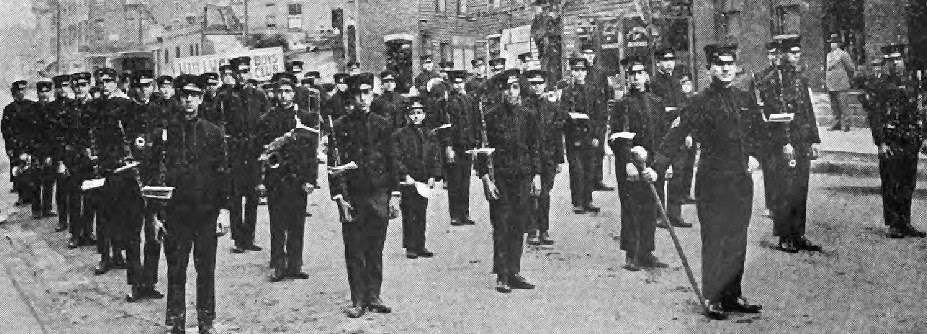
Hull House Boys Band

As well as teaching music at Hull House, Smith served as its choral director. She also composed songs and arranged music specifically for her students to perform. She initiated an annual Christmas concert which also included a dramatic presentation and was eagerly anticipated by the neighborhood for its holiday pageantry. Under her direction of the music school, the Hull House Boy's Band developed, which included immigrant boys from the neighborhood who would later become noted jazz performers. Jazz pianist Art Hodes recalled that one of the first jam sessions he ever had occurred when a young clarinetist named Benny Goodman joined the Boy's Band. James Petrillo, who later led the American Federation of Musicians, a musician's union, was also a member of the group.

In addition to her work at Hull House, Smith was involved in public education. Francis Wayland Parker invited her to head the vocal music department at the Chicago Normal School in 1897 and John Dewey asked her to teach at the University of Chicago as the head of the Department of Music, School of Education from 1901 to 1910. She not only trained teachers for Dewey but assisted him in developing a revised curriculum for the music education program. Smith also instructed courses at the Chicago Kindergarten College and at the Froebel Kindergarten College, both training colleges for teachers of very young children.

== Personal life ==
Smith favored women's suffrage and was an Episcopalian by religion. She was a member of the Chicago Woman's Club, Chickaming Country Club, North Side Branch Equal Suffrage League, and the Audubon Society. In 1897, she moved into the settlement house and lived there until 1924. At that time, she lived in the home of Mary Rozet Smith, where she remained until around 1934. Then, Smith returned to Hull House as a resident until she retired in 1936 and her sister Gertrude succeeded her. Thereafter, for health reasons, Smith moved to Midland, Michigan, where she resided with a niece until her death on June 30, 1942, in Midland. She was buried in Annapolis, Maryland.

Posthumously, Smith's papers were donated to the University of Illinois at Chicago to preserve what Jane Addams described as "one of the most finely creative minds" which "fulfilled the highest mission of music".

== Selected works ==
- Smith, Eleanor; with words by Kate Starr Kellogg (1885). Five Songs. Chicago, Illinois: W. H. Willis and company.
- Smith, Eleanor (1887). Songs for little children: pt. 1: a collection of songs and games for kindergartens and primary schools. Springfield, Massachusetts: Milton Bradley Company.
- Smith, Eleanor (1891). A first book in vocal music. Modern music series. Chicago, Illinois: Scott, Foresman & Co.
- Smith, Eleanor (1894). Songs for little children: pt. 2: a collection of songs and games for kindergartens and primary schools. Springfield, Massachusetts: Milton Bradley Company.
- Smith, Eleanor; Adam, Julia M. (1898). The beginner's book of vocal music. Chicago, Illinois: Scott, Foresman & Co.
- Smith, Eleanor (1901). A First Book in Vocal Music. The Modern Music Series. Vol. Book 1. New York, New York: Silver Burdette and Company.
- Smith, Eleanor (1901). A Second Book in Vocal Music. The Modern Music Series. Vol. Book 2. New York, New York: Silver Burdette and Company.
- Smith, Eleanor (1901). A Third Book in Vocal Music. The Modern Music Series. Vol. Book 3. New York, New York: Silver Burdette and Company.
- Smith, Eleanor (1905). A Fourth Book in Vocal Music. The Modern Music Series. Vol. Book 4. New York, New York: Silver Burdette and Company.
- Smith, Eleanor (1909). The Eleanor Smith Music Course Manual. New York, New York: American Book Company.
- Smith, Eleanor (1911). The Eleanor Smith Music Primer. New York, New York: American Book Company.

== Bibliography ==
- Addams, Jane (1911). Twenty Years at Hull House. New York, New York: Macmillan Company.
- Alper, Clifford D. (Summer 1980). "The Early Childhood Song Books of Eleanor Smith: Their Affinity with the Philosophy of Friedrich Froebel". Journal of Research in Music Education. 28 (2). Sage Publications, Inc.: 111–118. doi:10.1177/002242948002800204. ISSN 0022-4294. JSTOR 3344819. S2CID 146584405.
- Cassano (Graham), Lunin Schultz (Rima) and Payette (Jessica) (2019). Eleanor Smith's Hull House Songs: The Music of Protest and Hope in Jane Addams's Chicago. Leiden: Brill. ISBN 978-90-0428965-9.
- Elrod, Pamela G. (2001). "Eleanor Sophia Smith". In Schultz, Rima Lunin; Hast, Adele (eds.). Women Building Chicago 1790–1990: A Biographical Dictionary (1st ed.). Bloomington, Indiana: Indiana University Press. pp. 810–812. ISBN 978-0-253-33852-5.
- Howe, Sondra Wieland (November 7, 2013). Women Music Educators in the United States: A History. Scarecrow Press. ISBN 978-0-8108-8848-7.
- Keene, James A. (2010). A History of Music Education in the United States (2nd ed.). Centenniel, Colorado: Glenbridge Publishing Ltd. ISBN 978-0-944435-66-3.
- Leonard, John W. (1914). Woman's Who's who of America: A Biographical Dictionary of Contemporary Women of the United States and Canada, 1914–1915. American Commonwealth Company. p. 756.
- Mathews, W. S. B., ed. (October 1908). "An Interview with Eleanor Smith". The Journal of School Music. 1 (1). Chicago, Illinois: Eunice R. Plumb-Brandt: 112–117. Archived from the original on January 8, 2023.
- Otis, Philo Adams (1913). The First Presbyterian church, 1833–1913; a history of the oldest organization in Chicago, with biographical sketches of the ministers and extracts from the choir records. Chicago, Illinois: F. H. Revell Company.
- Vaillant, Derek (2003). Sounds of Reform: Progressivism and Music in Chicago, 1873–1935. UNC Press Books. ISBN 978-0-8078-5481-5.
- Volk, Terese M. (Winter 2007). ""Charts and Other Paraphernalia": Charles H. Congdon (1856–1928) and His Music Teaching Materials". Journal of Research in Music Education. 55 (4). Sage Publications, Inc.: 302–312. doi:10.1177/0022429408317512. ISSN 0022-4294. JSTOR 27639197. S2CID 191620215.
