= Mary Rozet Smith =

American philanthropist

- Born: December 23, 1868; Chicago, Illinois, US
- Died: February 22, 1934 (aged 65); Chicago, Illinois, US
- Occupation: philanthropist
- Years active: 1890-1934
- Known for: benefactress of Hull House

Mary Rozet Smith (December 23, 1868 – February 22, 1934) was a Chicago-born US philanthropist who was one of the trustees and benefactors of Hull House. She was the partner of activist Jane Addams for over thirty years. Smith provided the financing for the Hull House Music School and donated the school's organ as a memorial to her mother. She was active in several social betterment societies in Chicago at the turn of the 20th century.

== Biography ==
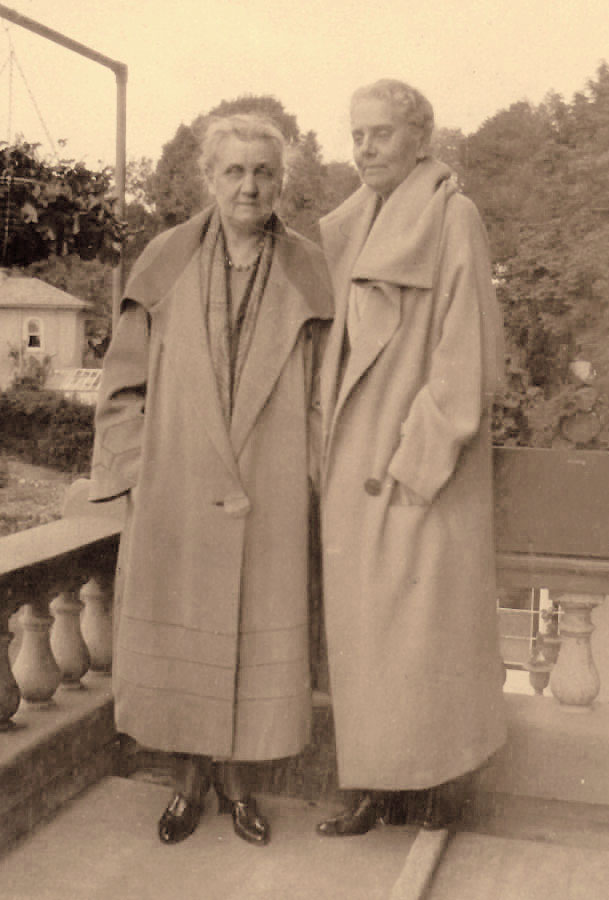
Jane Addams Collection/Swarthmore College Peace Collection. Jane Addams & Mary Rozet Smith, 1923

Mary Rozet Smith was born on 23 December 1868 in Chicago, Illinois to Sarah (née Rozet) and Charles Mather Smith. She was raised in a wealthy, privileged home, the daughter of the Bradner-Smith Paper Company president. As was typical of women of her social class, she did not attend university. As a young woman, she participated in activities usual to her social standing, as part of the Social Register and traveled extensively in Europe.

She became involved in Hull House in 1890, shortly after its founding, becoming one of its major financial contributors and serving as one of the trustees. Around the same time, Eleanor Sophia Smith (no relation) also joined Hull House and the women began collaborating on the development of a music school. Smith provided the financial backing to create the school in 1893 and hire teachers and Eleanor became the director of the school. In 1902, she donated a Hook and Hastings pipe organ in honor of her mother to Hull House for the music school.

In addition to her philanthropy at Hull House, Smith served on the executive committee of the Juvenile Protective Association of Chicago and was a contributor to the Henry Booth House, another of Chicago's settlement houses. She was also active on the advisory board of the social worker's committee of the United Charities of Chicago for the DeKoven District. Not all of her philanthropy was focused through organizations, as she was known to provide direct aid to families. In one instance, she paid for the education, including university studies, of three children for a mother who had fled from her husband. At this time period, women's groups and organizations often provided social services because governmental structure to do so was lacking. Smith was a member of many of these types of clubs, such as the Chicago Women's Club from 1888 and the Friday Club.

Smith was the companion and partner of Jane Addams for over 30 years and there has been much speculation of their life and relationship. Addams burned many of their letters, but also referred to their relationship as a "marriage". They traveled together, co-owned a home in Maine, and remained committed to each other. In 1895, after Addams had suffered from a bout with typhoid fever, she went abroad with Smith, traveling to London. There, they visited several settlement houses, including Oxford House, Browning House, Bermondsey Settlement, and others. They proceeded on to Moscow and met Tolstoy, traveled through southern Russia, ventured into Poland, and visited Germany before returning to Chicago.

Early in 1934, Addams had a heart attack and Smith nursed her at her home, neglecting her own illness. Smith succumbed to pneumonia, fell into a coma and then died on 22 February 1934. Addams was considered too ill to descend the stairs to attend Smith's memorial service, which she could hear from her second-floor room.

== Bibliography ==
- Addams, Jane (1932). The excellent becomes the permanent. New York, New York: The Macmillan Company.
- Addams, Jane (1935). Forty years at Hull-House; being "Twenty years at Hull-House" and "The second twenty years at Hull-House". New York, New York: The Macmillan Company.
- Chicago Woman’s Club (1900–1901). Twenty-fourth Annual Announcement of the Chicago Woman's Club. Chicago, Illinois: Lakeside Press/R. R. Donelley & Sons Company.
- Cott, Nancy F. (1994). Social and Moral Reform. History of Women in the United States: Historical Articles on Women’s Lives and Activities. Vol. 17 Part 2. Munich, Germany: Walter de Gruyter. ISBN 978-3-11-097109-5.
- Fradin, Judith Bloom; Fradin, Dennis B. (2006). Jane Addams: Champion of Democracy. New York, New York: Houghton Mifflin Harcourt. ISBN 0-618-50436-2.
- The year book of the Friday Club (Report). Chicago, Illinois. 1907.
- Henry Booth House Annual Report (Report). Chicago, Illinois. January 1913.
- Fourteenth Annual Report The Juvenile Protective Association of Chicago (Report). Chicago, Illinois: Hale-Drossley Printing Company. 1914–1915.
- Mathews, W. S. B., ed. (October 1908). "An Interview with Eleanor Smith". The Journal of School Music. 1 (1). Chicago, Illinois: Eunice R. Plumb-Brandt: 112–117.
- Sandlin, Jennifer A.; Schultz, Brian D.; Burdick, Jake (2010). Handbook of Public Pedagogy: Education and Learning Beyond Schooling. New York, New York: Routledge. ISBN 978-1-135-18419-3.
- Social Register, Chicago, 1906. Vol. 20. New York City, New York: The Social Register Association. November 1905.
- Year book of the United Charities of Chicago (Report). Chicago, Illinois: Hildmann Printing Company. 1915–1916.
