= Laura Dainty Pelham =

American actress (1846–1924)

- Pelham, from a 1924 newspaper
- Born: Laura Mount; August 30, 1846; Southwick, Massachusetts, U.S.
- Died: January 22, 1924 (aged 77); Chicago, Illinois, U.S.
- Occupations: actress, social worker, director, gardens advocate, clubwoman

Laura Mount Dainty Pelham (August 30, 1846 – January 22, 1924) was an American actress, social worker, clubwoman, and theatrical director based in Chicago. She was director of the Hull House Dramatic Association, president of the Hull House Woman's Club, and founder of the City Gardens Association.

== Early life and education ==
Mount was born in Southwick, Massachusetts, the daughter of Charles T. Mount and Maria Hannah Perkins Mount (later Craft).

== Career ==
Mount was a teacher as a young woman. Beginning in 1871, she toured giving dramatic recitations on the Chautauqua platform and with the Redpath Lyceum Bureau. She began acting in plays in 1875, often in soubrette roles. She starred in A Mountain Pink on tour in 1885. While traveling as an actress, she also gave readings at institutions, including prisons and mental hospitals. "She stands the undisputed queen of the rostrum as an elocutionist," a Nebraska newspaper assured readers in 1882.

Mount became involved with Hull House in the early 1890s. In 1899, she was vice-president of the Hull House Woman's Club; in 1900, she became the club's president. Jane Addams appointed her as director of the Hull House Dramatic Association in 1900. Far from being light amateur entertainments, she directed the company in productions of serious plays by Synge, Lady Gregory, Boucicault, Ben Jonson, "Shaw, Pinero, Galsworthy, and Ibsen". The Hull House Players made a tour in England, Ireland, France and the Netherlands in 1913.

Pelham ran unsuccessfully for the office of alderman in 1902. "I would give the streets a good scrubbing," she explained of her platform. Also that year, she managed the American tour of Charlotte Perkins Gilman. In 1909 Pelham founded the City Gardens Association, which involved acquiring and preparing land in Chicago to become gardens, tended by workers to supplement their income and diet. In 1910 she helped the Women's Trade Union League (WTUL) to organize garment workers during a strike in Chicago.

== Personal life ==
Mount married Albert H. Dainty in 1880. She married theatrical manager Fred Taunton Pelham in 1892; they separated in 1904. She had a daughter, also named Laura Dainty, who also became an actress. Her daughter died in 1918, and Pelham died in 1924, at the age of 77, at Hull House. The Laura Dainty Pelham Cottage at Bowen Country Club in Waukegan was named in 1925 in her memory.
