= Jack Benny Center for the Arts =

- Interactive map of Jack Benny Center for the Arts
- Address: Bowen Park; Waukegan, Illinois; United States
- Coordinates: 42°23′14″N 87°49′57″W
- Owner: Waukegan Park District

Website
- www.waukeganparks.org/location/jbc/

The Jack Benny Center for the Arts, located in Bowen Park, Waukegan, Illinois, is the Cultural Arts Division of the Waukegan Park District. The Center plays host to the Bowen Park Theatre and Opera Company (a professional theatre/opera company), the Waukegan Symphony Orchestra and Concert Chorus (community based performance groups), as well as a number of theatre, dance, and /visual art classes and private music and voice lessons. The center started out as a not-for-profit corporation in 1964. Upon the death of Jack Benny in 1974, the name was changed. The music and fine arts school became part of the Waukegan Park District in 1982 as a division of the recreation department.

== History ==
The Waukegan Park District completed a new home for the center and its departments in Bowen Park in 1987 and had become its own division of the park district. Originally the Center had been in Bowen Park, moved to Powell Park for a time, and was delighted to return to Bowen Park. With the addition of Goodfellow Hall, an eighty-nine-seat lecture-recital hall, the division founded Bowen Park Theatre and Bowen Park Opera in the mid 1980s. These two companies went from semi-professional to fully professional, non-Equity, non-union in three years.

Waukegan Symphony Orchestra was born on April 24, 1974, when favorite comedic son Jack Benny returned to his home town of Waukegan to star in the WSO's initial performance. It was a magical night, held at Waukegan High School's auditorium. Like the Music Center of Lake County, the Waukegan Symphony Orchestra has made itself synonymous with the broad range of culture that is the hallmark of the city. Through its thirty-five-plus-year history, the Waukegan Symphony Orchestra has engaged its audiences in both traditional and challenging works. Musical direction now rests in the hands of Maestro Stephen Blackwelder.

Waukegan Concert Chorus was established as a community chorus in 1976 to sing with the Waukegan Symphony Orchestra in a performance of Verdi's Requiem. Both the members of the community recognized the great benefit of retaining such a cultural asset in the community and the Chorus continued as an independent sister organization to the Waukegan Symphony Orchestra.

Lynn Schornick and Ken Smouse founded Bowen Park Theatre Company in the spring of 1987 at approximately the same time as Bowen Park Opera. The company's objective was to produce mostly classical drama and comedies, avoiding musicals and the repertory of neighboring theatre groups. Within three years, Bowen Park Theatre became a fully professional, non-equity theatre, joining the professional ranks of only two other companies in Lake County. Currently, the Ensemble Players (college age), the Roundtree Players (14–18 years of age) and Stage One (8–13 years of age) give the youth to young adults of the community an opportunity to develop and study the art of acting, also use the Dr. Lynn Schornick Theatre in Goodfellow Hall.

Bowen Park Opera Company has its roots to the Waukegan Symphony Orchestra performances in the mid-1980s. In 1987, the new Jack Benny Center for the Arts facility was completed in Bowen Park. Lynn Schornick and Ken Smouse founded Bowen Park Opera Company to perform in Goodfellow Hall. Its first production was a double bill in the spring of 1987 of Holst's The Wandering Scholar and Mozart's The Impresario. In 2003, Goodfellow Hall was renamed the Dr. Lynn Schornick Theatre in Goodfellow Hall to honor the man who had led the Cultural Arts to where it is today. Dr. Schornick retired from the Waukegan Park District in 2004.

In 1994, the Cultural Arts Division became responsible for the programs of the Waukegan Park District's Historic Districts. The operation and restoration of the Haines Museum in Bowen Park was only a part of that. Programs were developed and the newest of the Cultural Arts' departments, Bowen Heritage Circle, was born. The Bowen Heritage Circle specializes in traditional and special interest crafts and lectures. The Waukegan Historical Society rents the Haines House and library space at Lilac Cottage. The society maintains the collections and the park district provides the organization with a museum supervisor.

Goodfellow Hall was a part of the Jane Addams' Hull House Settlement House's Bowen Country Club.
