= Rena Maverick Green =

American painter

- Born: February 10, 1874; Sedalia, Missouri, US
- Died: November 29, 1962 (aged 88); San Antonio, Texas, US
- Resting place: Mission Burial Park South, San Antonio, Texas
- Spouse: Robert Berrien Green
- Children: 4

Rena Maverick Green (February 10, 1874 – November 29, 1962) was an artist, a suffragist and a co-founder of the San Antonio Conservation Society. She was a pioneer woman member of the San Antonio School Board and served on the board of trustees of the San Antonio Public Library. She was a preservationist for San Antonio history, including San Antonio Missions National Historical Park and the saving of many city parks. Green helped preserve the Spanish Governor's Palace and the San Antonio River Walk. She was the granddaughter of a signer of the Texas Declaration of Independence, and the widow of a Texas state Senator.

== Early life ==
Mary Rowena Maverick, known her entire life as Rena, was the eldest child of George Madison Maverick and Mary Elizabeth Vance Maverick. She was born February 10, 1874, in Sedalia, Missouri. Her five siblings were pacifist suffragist Lola Maverick Lloyd, George Vance Maverick, artist and conservationist Lucy Madison Maverick, Augusta Lewis Maverick and educator Lewis Adams Maverick. She attended the private educational institutions Mary Institute and St. Louis Country Day School, and Stuart Hall School in Stanton, Virginia.

Her grandparents, Samuel Augustus Maverick (1803–1870), a signer of the Texas Declaration of Independence, and pioneer diarist Mary Maverick (1818–1898), had been living in San Antonio since 1838. In 1896, George Madison and Mary Elizabeth Maverick and their six children moved to San Antonio.

She married Robert Berrien Green in 1897, and was widowed by 1907. The couple had four children. At the time of the marriage, her husband was judge of the Thirty-seventh Judicial District of Texas. In 1900, he was elected County Judge, and in 1906 was elected to the state Senate from the Twenty-fourth Senatorial District.

== Editor and publisher ==
In 1921, she edited and published the Memoirs of Mary A. Maverick. She also edited The Swisher Memoirs , Mavericks, Samuel Maverick : Texan and Robert B. Green: A Personal Reminiscence.

== Civic activities and historic preservation ==
She was a member of the board of the local Yanaguana Society, formed in 1933 by historian Frederick C. Chabot. Named for the site of the Payaya people village that existed where San Antonio was later settled, its 14-year existence was dedicated to discovering and preserving the city's historical records. Green became active in many organizations, including being one of the first women on the San Antonio School Board, and serving on the board of trustees of the San Antonio Public Library. She worked on behalf of the National Women's Party of Texas (NWPT) for passage of the Nineteenth Amendment to the United States Constitution giving women the vote. NWPT elected her state chair in 1926.

== San Antonio Conservation Society ==
Green was an artist in the mediums of sculpture, painting and watercolor. She won first prize for watercolor in the Southern Artists Show and first prize in the Texas Small Sculpture Contest. Green became interested in the Arts and Crafts movement inspired by William Lethaby. She studied with Charles Martin and Maurice Stern in Provincetown, Massachusetts, San Francisco, California. In 1924, Green became acquainted with artist Emily Edwards who had been renting a house from Green's sister Lucy Madison Maverick. Sharing a common perspective about protesting the razing of a house that lay in the path of a proposed San Antonio River bypass, the two women formed the San Antonio Conservation Society (SACS). Edwards served as the organization's first president. Green served as SACS president 1933–1935. In 1929, Green was appointed chair of a city committee to restore the Spanish Governor's Palace. When a proposal was made calling for draining and cementing over the part of the river that today is known as the San Antonio River Walk, SACS joined with the City Federation of Women's Clubs to successfully stop the proposal.

She championed saving what later became known as San Antonio Missions National Historical Park. As chair of the Missions Committee of the Alamo Mission Chapter of the Daughters of the Republic of Texas, she proposed a thousand-acre park to protect the missions. Green was of the opinion that saving the missions also meant saving the surrounding environments. In 1924, she courted the State Parks Board and Governor Pat Neff with a personal tour and a chapter-sponsored dinner. She received advice from California conservationist Charles Fletcher Lummis on how to purchase and preserve the missions. SACS purchased the granary at Mission San José, and worked with the Works Progress Administration (WPA) to restore it. Green directed WPA workers to sift through the soil for any archeological relics. At Mission San Juan Capistrano, the workers unearthed a 7-foot skeleton in the baptistry. SACS also purchased the "Huisache Bowl" gravel pit adjoining Mission San José, and the WPA transformed it into an amphitheater. SACS deeded it over to the State Parks Board in 1940.

Green became a driving force in the SACS efforts of saving city parks. In 1946, she led SACS into a successful campaign to save San Pedro Park from being turned into a college campus. Mahncke Park was likewise saved by Green and SACS from redevelopment into the site of an office building. In 1953, when she was 79 years old, she helped spearhead the SACS successful campaign to save Travis Park from having an underground parking lot built beneath it. The park was originally created when her grandfather Samuel Augustus Maverick deeded his land to the city upon his death.

== Death ==
Robert Green died on December 1, 1907. Rena never remarried and outlived her husband by 55 years, dying on November 29, 1962.

== Bibliography ==
- Maverick, Mary Adams; Green, Rena Maverick; Maverick, Geo. Madison (1921). Memoirs of Mary A. Maverick. Alamo Printing Company.
- Green, Rena Maverick; Swisher, John Milton (1932). The Swisher Memoirs. The Sigmund Press. OCLC 2588659.
- Green, Rena Maverick; Maverick, George M (1937). "Mavericks"; Authentic Account of the Term "Maverick" as Applied to Unbranded Cattle. Guessax & Ferlet. OCLC 602361270.
- Green, Rena Maverick (1952). Samuel Maverick : Texan, 1803–1870. H. Wolff. OCLC 732847189.
- Green, Rena Maverick (1962). Robert B. Green: A Personal Reminiscence. OCLC 52109.
