= Emily Edwards =

American painter

- Born: October 7, 1888; San Antonio, Texas, US
- Died: February 16, 1980 (aged 91); San Antonio, Texas, US
- Resting place: San Jose Burial Park, San Antonio, Texas
- Known for: Helped save the San Antonio River Walk
- Spouse: Librado de Cantabrana (div.)
- Children: One child (died in infancy)

Emily Edwards (October 7, 1888– February 16, 1980) was a co-founder and first president of the San Antonio Conservation Society. She was an artist, historian and teacher, and a lifelong friend of Diego Rivera. She is remembered as being a key figure in preventing the paving over of the part of the San Antonio River that is now known as the San Antonio River Walk.

== San Antonio Conservation Society ==
On March 23, 1924, thirteen women gathered in San Antonio for the first meeting of the San Antonio Conservation Society (SACS). The two women who had organized SACS the day before were Rena Maverick Green and Edwards. They assembled a group who were interested in protesting the razing of a house that lay in the path of a proposed San Antonio River bypass. Edwards was elected the organization's first president. She used her artistic bent to put on a September puppet show for city commissioners aimed at preventing a section of the river (now known as the San Antonio River Walk) from being paved over. The title of the puppet show was "The Goose and the Golden Eggs". The goose was representative of the river, and each egg embodied an aspect of city culture that benefited from the river. Edwards served as the SACS president for two years, overseeing the organization's efforts to preserve the uniqueness of San Antonio.

== Early life ==
She was born on October 7, 1888, to Frank Mudge Edwards and his wife Lillian Brockway Edwards of San Antonio. When Emily was seven years old, her mother died, leaving her father to raise four daughters as a single parent. At age ten, she was enrolled at the Ursuline Academy in San Antonio. She later attended the San Antonio Female Institute.

== Artist ==
From early on, Edwards exhibited promise as an artist. She took classes from artists Pompeo Coppini in Texas and Diego Rivera in Mexico. She also trained with Harry Mills Walcott, John Vanderpoel, Ralph Clarkson and Enella Benedict. In 1905, she enrolled in the Art Institute of Chicago, where she was also employed. While in Chicago, she taught art classes at Hull House and the Francis W. Parker School. After leaving Chicago in 1917, she taught for the next several years at schools in San Antonio and West Virginia. She expanded her creative skills by working as a stage designer in New York City and performing as a puppeteer in Massachusetts. In the 1930s, she served as Hull House's artistic director.

== Diego Rivera and Mexico ==
Edwards began spending extended periods in Mexico in 1925. She took classes from Diego Rivera and remained a friend of his throughout the rest of his life. In all, Edwards spent a decade off and on in Mexico, practicing her craft and researching the Mexican influence on the art world. During that time, she published books and pamphlets on Mexican art. She married and divorced Librado de Cantabrana. The couple had one child, who died in infancy.

== Final years and death ==
From the 1950s onward, Edwards spent the rest of her life in San Antonio. She died on February 16, 1980.

== Bibliography ==
- Edwards, Emily (1925). The Story in Your Hand. Renard. OCLC 8336139.
- Edwards, Emily; Alvarez Bravo, Manuel (1932). The Frescoes by Diego Rivera in Cuernavaca. Cvltvr. OCLC 5508189.
- Edwards, Emily (1934). Modern Mexican Frescoes. Central News Co. OCLC 3351627.
- Edwards, Emily; Alvarez Bravo, Manuel (1966). Painted Walls of Mexico from Prehistoric Times Until Today. University of Texas Press. OCLC 170540.
- Edwards, Emily (1981). Stones, Bells, Lighted Candles: Personal Memories of the Old Ursuline Academy in San Antonio at the Turn of the Century. Daughters of the Republic of Texas Library. OCLC 8672070.
- Edwards, Emily (1985). F. Giraud and San Antonio. Southwest Craft Center. OCLC 13515039.
