= Travis Park =

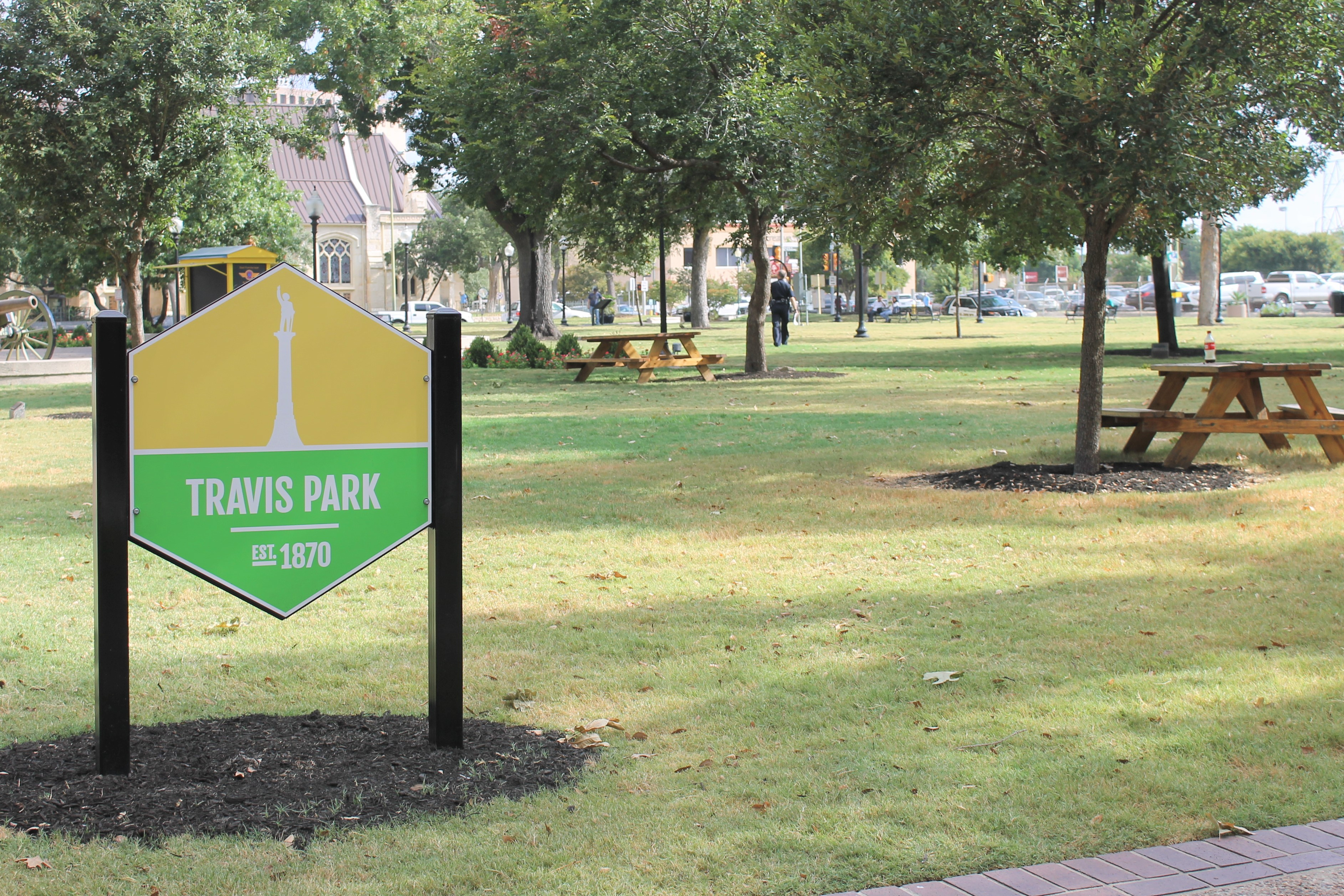
- Travis Park in 2015

- Location within Texas
- Interactive map of Travis Park
- Type: Public City Park
- Location: 301 E. Travis; San Antonio, Texas
- Coordinates: 29°25′41″N 98°29′21″W
- Area: 2.6 acres (0.011 km^{2})
- Created: 1870
- Operator: City of San Antonio Parks and Recreation
- Open: Sunday-Saturday: 5 a.m. – 11 p.m.
- Website: www.travisparksa.com

Travis Park is located in San Antonio in Bexar County in the U.S. state of Texas. Once a part of the original Alamo Mission in San Antonio, the park is located across the street from the restored Saint Anthony Hotel.

== History ==
Francisco Garcia purchased the land in 1819. In 1851, the land was acquired by Samuel Augustus Maverick, came to Texas in 1835 from South Carolina. He was a signer of the Texas Declaration of Independence and became a leading citizen in San Antonio. In 1861, he favored secession from the Union. He was mayor of San Antonio during the Civil War; his four sons fought in the Confederate Army.

Upon his death in 1870, Maverick deeded the property to the city of San Antonio, which originally named it Travis Plaza, in honor of Alamo commandant William Barret Travis. In 1953, Maverick's granddaughter Rena Maverick Green spearheaded the San Antonio Conservation Society's successful campaign to block the construction of an underground parking lot at the park.

After the Civil War, United Daughters of the Confederacy commissioned the design and construction of a Confederate statue in memory of the common soldiers of the Civil War in what became Travis Park. Designed by Louisiana artist Elizabeth Montgomery and constructed by Llano stone carver Frank Teich in 1899, it was the first monument designed by a woman in the United States and the first monument of its kind ever placed in San Antonio. The UDC financed this project with bake sales, teas, and quilting bees and was supported by the citizenry of San Antonio. Perpetual use of land for the statue in Travis Park was given to the United Daughters of the Confederacy by unanimous vote of the City Council and the City of San Antonio in 1899. This memorial was removed by order of the San Antonio, TX city council on August 31, 2017.

Many improvements have been made to the park over the years, through the generous donations of time and money from public entities and private individuals. The site currently hosts an annual outdoor jazz festival.
