= Myrtle Merritt French =

American ceramicist (1886-1970)

- Born: 1887
- Died: 1970 (aged 82–83)
- Known for: Ceramicist

Myrtle Merritt French (1886–1970) was an American ceramicist. She is known for founding the Hull-House Kilns program and for directing the program from 1927 to 1937.

French studied with Charles Fergus Binns at Alfred University. She went on to teach at Alfred, the Carnegie Institute of Technology, and the School of the Art Institute of Chicago. French began teaching at Hull House in 1924. The program became an income generating concern in 1927, producing decorative pottery and dinnerware. French was able to facilitate exhibiting Hull-House Kilns artists at the Art Institute of Chicago.

An essay by Scott A. Vermillion for the International Museum of Dinnerware Design presents the opinion that French's designs can be seen as an influence for Fiesta dinnerware.
