= Wallace Kirkland =

American photographer

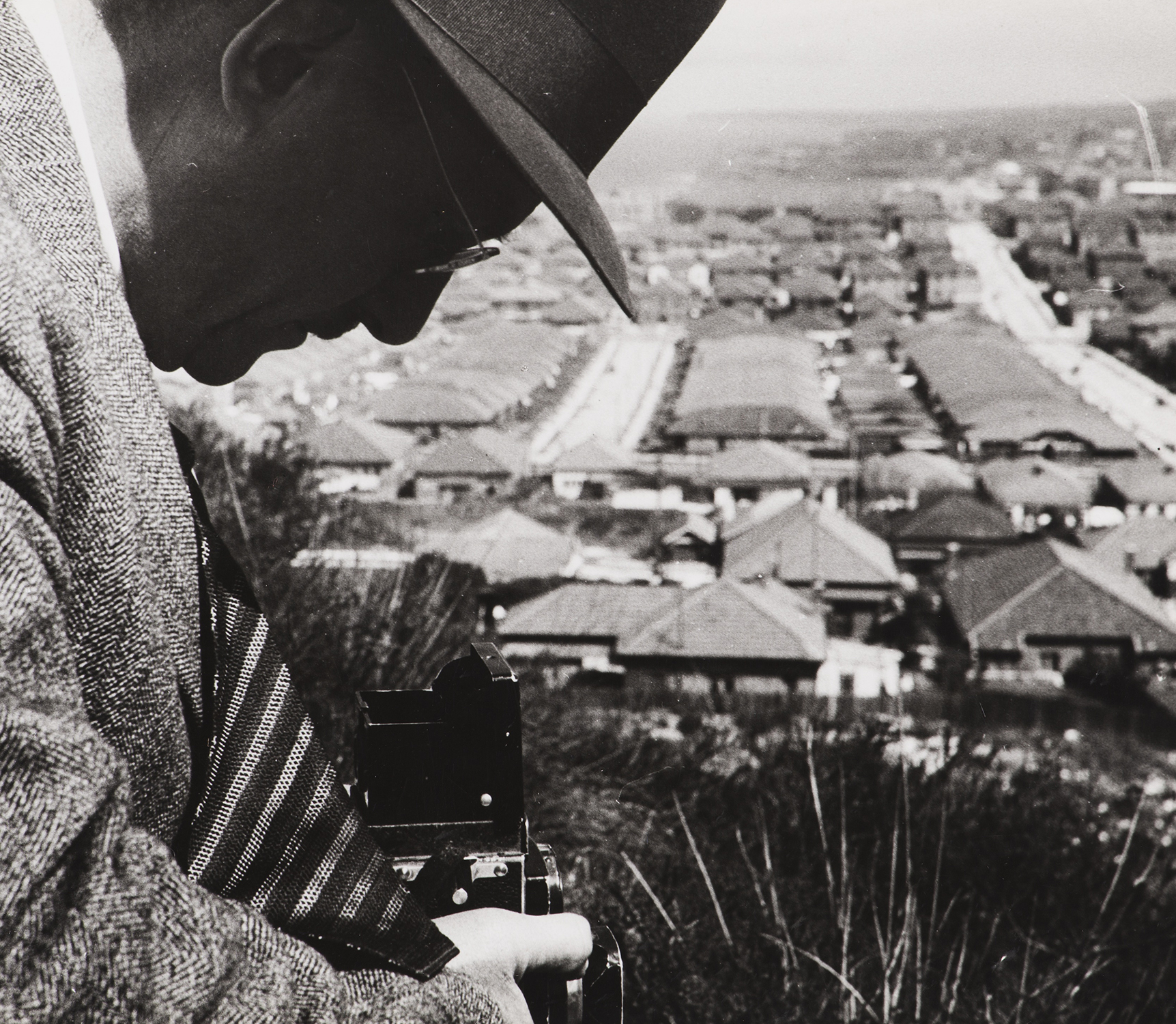
- Kirkland, photographed by Max Dupain
- Born: Jamaica
- Died: September 14, 1979 (aged 87–88); Oak Park, Illinois
- Occupations: photojournalist, social worker
- Spouse: Ethel Freeland
- Children: 4

Wallace "Kirk" Kirkland (1891–1979) was an American social worker and photojournalist who worked for Life Magazine.

== Early life and education ==
Kirkland was born and raised on a coconut plantation in Jamaica, the second child of Scot William Dixon and Brit Emma Elworthy.

His parents separated in 1905 and he moved to New York with his mother and sister in August 1905. Kirkland worked at a variety of jobs in New York and New Jersey. He was a pipe washer, a grocery store clerk and ran a Boy's Club at a YMCA. He was a graduate of George Williams College, studying social work. During World War I, Kirkland left school to travel to Texas where he assisted troops through the YMCA. He married Ethel Freeland on May 27, 1918.

== Early career ==
Kirkland worked as a social worker after the war at Fort Huachuca, Arizona. He returned to Chicago and completed his degree in sociology with a thesis on "Utilizing Gang Control in Boy's Work," which was informed by his own work from the YMCA at the Boys Club at Hull House. In 1922 the couple were invited by Jane Addams to live at Hull House. Ethel worked in the nursery while and Kirk acted as director of the Hull House Boys Club. Kirkland's work was with teenage boys who lived in neighborhoods nearby. In 1929 he was commissioned as a Juvenile Court probation officer. Kirkland's belief was that it was necessary to expose kids to new experiences and have an embedded social worker who could know not just the teens but also their families. Kirkland would often take the Boys Club teens camping. Every summer for fifteen years he took a group of boys on a three-month long camping trip in northwestern Ontario.

== Photography career ==
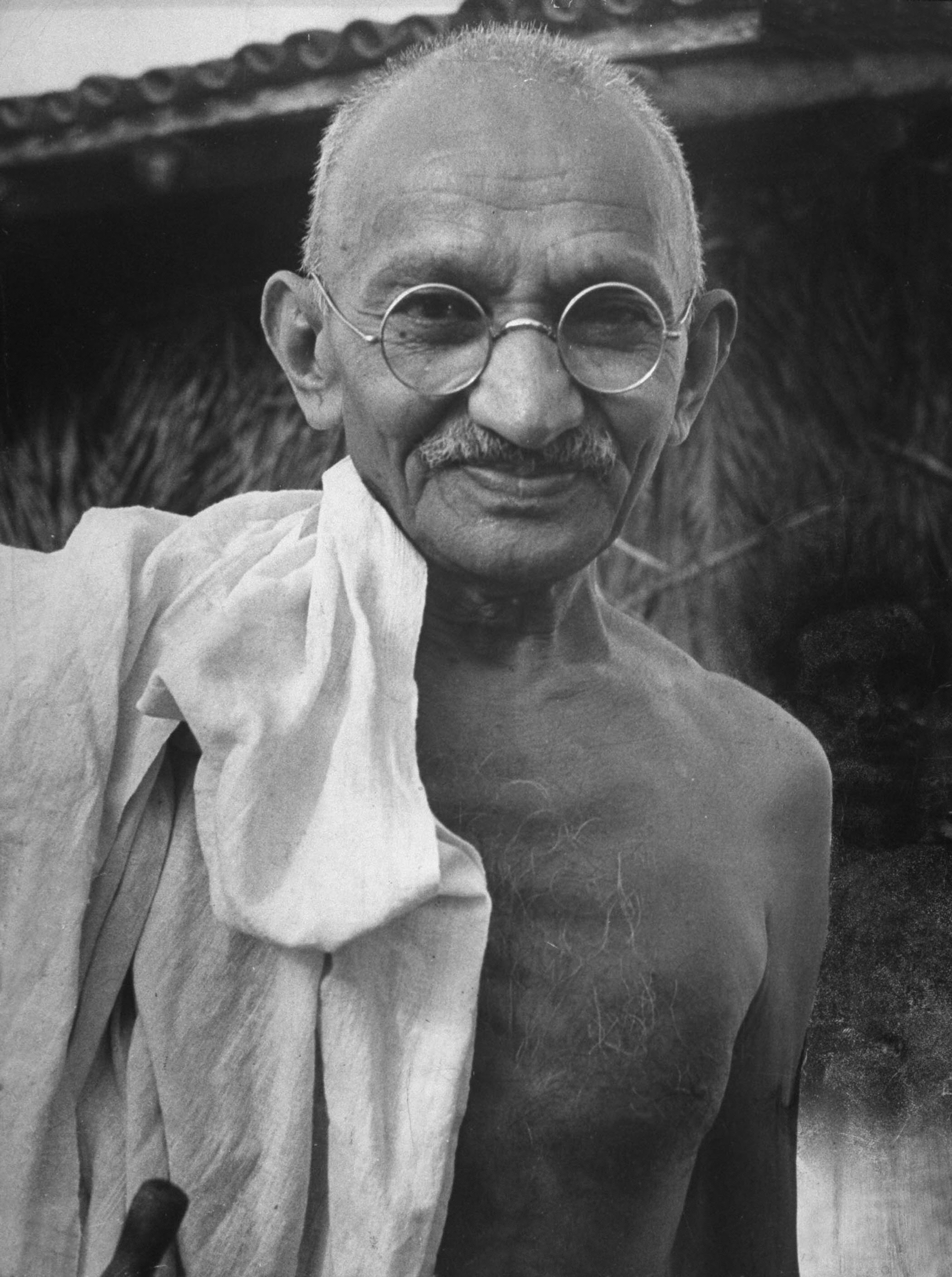
Gandhi in November 1942, taken by Wallace Kirkland

Eastman Kodak Company gave Kirkland a 5 x 7 view camera to teach photography to the Boys Club. He was a self-taught photographer and built himself a darkroom on site, becoming the personal photographer to Jane Addams. He took many local photos with the boys from Hull House, eventually choosing to leave social work and become a professional photographer in 1935.

In 1935 Kirkland opened a small photography studio in a carriage house in Oak Park Illinois, calling the area "Chicago's Bohemia." He was hired as a staff photographer by Life magazine in the founding year of its relaunch in 1936. Kirkland worked for the magazine for decades, photographing many significant historical figures and events. He met and photographed Mahatma Gandhi and Douglas MacArthur and worked for several months as the White House photographer with President Franklin Delano Roosevelt.

After World War II he was an instructor in Life's School of Photography for its New York correspondents. He was frequently traveling and corresponded often with his wife and children. He was said to have "carried a slate on which he wrote his name, the town he was in, the hotel and... the date" to keep track of where he was when he woke up in the morning. When his camera, a Rolleiflex, got stolen from him during some work in Australia, he said that the camera had "travelled more than 150,000 miles and taken more than 20,000 negatives in 25 countries." Of the camera he also said "I always knew when I had a good picture... It gave a sort of satisfied grunt." While maintaining his position at Life, he also worked on independent projects.

Kirkland's nature work led him to become a videographer, shooting a nature series for Life magazine and continued with his love of nature photography. He was awarded the Page One Award for outstanding newspaper work for his work with Life. He retired from Life Magazine in 1956. He continued to work independently after his retirement. In 1963 he photographed the demolition of most of the buildings that comprised Hull-House. He used his nature photography to create a series of books for children in 1971.

== Death and legacy ==
Kirkland was paralyzed by a stroke in 1969 and died September 14, 1979, at the age of eighty-eight. He "saved most everything from correspondence to unpublished notes, essays, and manuscripts. Most of his papers including negatives, prints, and scrapbooks are held at the Richard J. Daley Library at the University of Illinois at Chicago. Other papers including correspondence with his family and images of Robert Rauschenberg at work are held by the University of Wisconsin at Madison. The Rauschenberg images went undiscovered outside of the archives until 2016.

== Bibliography ==
- Shenshoo, the story of a moose (1930)
- 50 photographs by Wallace Kirkland, LIFE photographer (1952)
- Recollections of a LIFE Photographer (1954)
- Adventures of a Cameraman (1955)
- The Lure Of The Pond (1969)
- A walk by the seashore (1971)
- A walk by the pond (1971)
- A walk in the fields (1971)
- A walk in the woods (1971)
- The many faces of Hull-House : the photographs of Wallace Kirkland (1989) ISBN 0252016831
