= Charlotte E. Carr =

American labor activist (1890–1956)

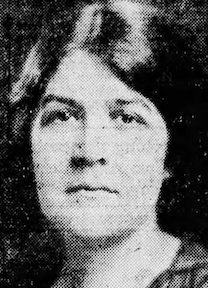
- Charlotte E. Carr, from a 1928 newspaper
- Born: May 3, 1890; Dayton, Ohio
- Died: July 12, 1956 (aged 66); New York City
- Occupations: Labor activist, state official
- Known for: Pennsylvania's Secretary of Labor and Industry, 1933–1934; Head resident at Hull House, 1937–1943

Charlotte Elizabeth Carr (May 3, 1890 – July 12, 1956) was an American labor activist and state official. She was appointed Pennsylvania's Secretary of Labor and Industry in 1933. She was the head resident at Chicago's Hull House from 1937 to 1942.

== Early life and education ==
Charlotte Elizabeth Carr was born in Dayton, Ohio, the daughter of businessman Joseph Henry Carr and Edith Carver Carr. She attended the Madeira School in Washington, D.C., and graduated from Vassar College in 1915. She pursued further studies at Columbia University.

== Career ==
After college, Carr worked in New York City in several jobs, including as a charities aid investigator for the state, and as a probation officer. She worked in personnel at American Lithographic and at Knox Hat Company during and after World War I, and at Stark Mills in New Hampshire for a time. She worked for the American Association of Social Workers in New York. In 1923, she became assistant director of the Bureau of Women in Industry, part of the New York State Department of Labor under Frances Perkins. In 1925, she took a similar position with the Pennsylvania Department of Labor and Industry. Following several other promotions within the state bureaucracy, Carr became Pennsylvania's first female Secretary of Labor and Industry in 1933, appointed by Governor Gifford Pinchot.

In 1934, she returned to New York City, where she was a governor's advisor on relief programs. In 1935, Mayor Fiorello La Guardia appointed Carr head of the city's Emergency Relief Bureau. In 1937, Carr moved to Chicago, when she was chosen by the Hull House board as the new head resident, replacing Adena Miller Rich. Carr's tenure included welcoming the first black residents to Hull House. She was fired in 1942, after repeated clashes with the board of trustees over her political activities and the direction of the program.

After Hull House, Carr held leadership positions with the War Manpower Commission and the Congress of Industrial Organizations. From 1944 to 1952, she was the founding director of the Citizens Committee on Children of New York City. She continued working in a variety of projects involving labor in the city until her death in 1956.

== Personal life and legacy ==
Carr was involved in a fatal car accident in 1931, when the state car she was driving from Harrisburg to Philadelphia hit a truck, and the truck's driver died. The Dauphin County coroner's office ruled the Carr was driving "in a reckless manner" and recommended she be charged with involuntary manslaughter, and she lost her driver's license.

Carr attended a meeting about housing rehabilitation hours before she died in her sleep in 1956, aged 66 years, in New York. Eleanor Roosevelt attended Carr's funeral and wrote a column in her memory. "Her life was so full and so valuable to so many people that one can only be thankful that she had 66 years in which to give of her extraordinary powers," wrote Roosevelt, adding "I don't think she was ever afraid of any situation." There is a collection of Charlotte E. Carr's papers at the Schlesinger Library, Harvard University.
