= Hull House Music School =

Music school in Chicago, Illinois, US

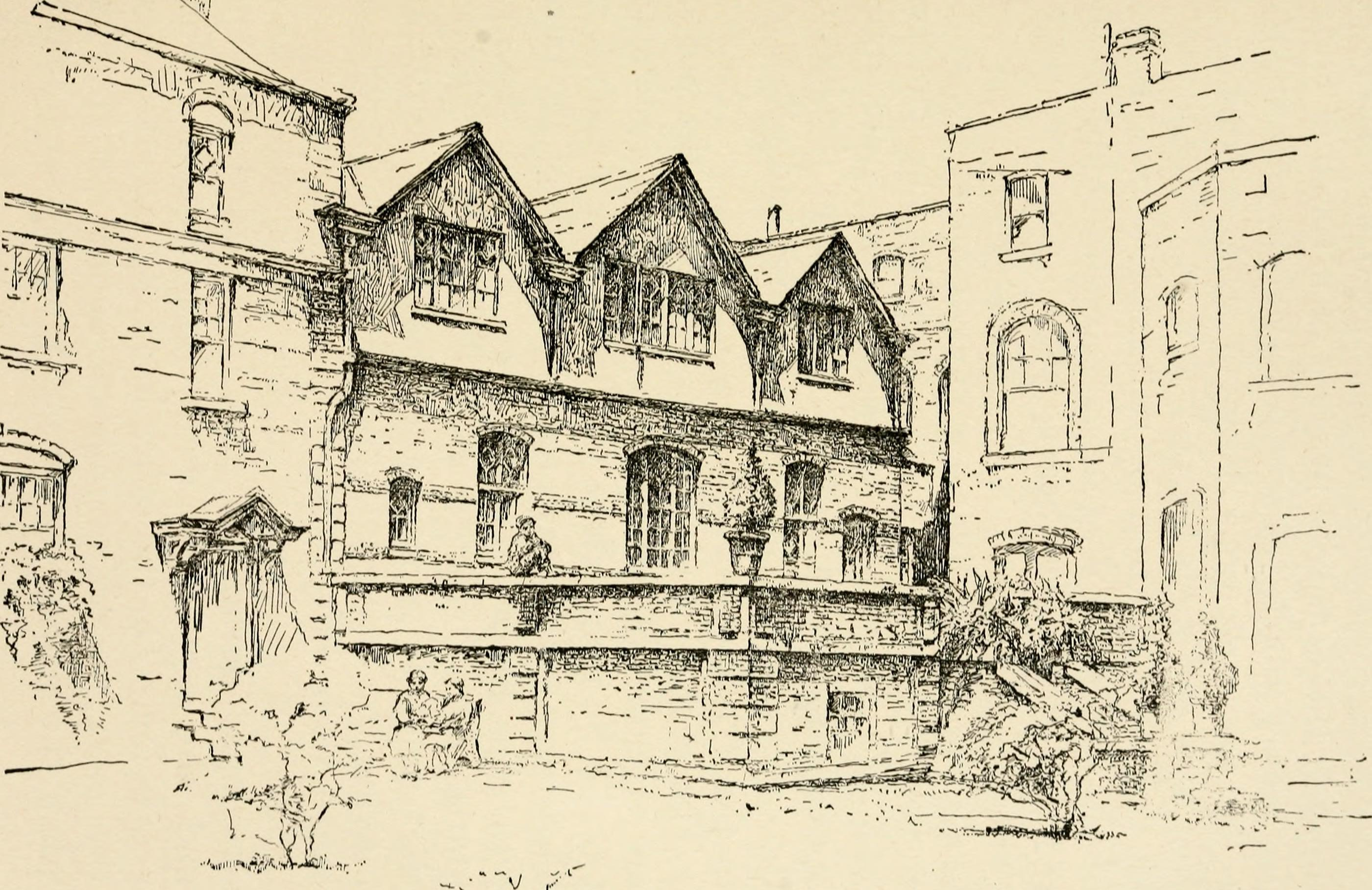
Hull House Music School

Hull House Music School was the first music school in the US settlement movement, and one of the first community-based US music schools. Located in the Near West Side of Chicago, Illinois, it was founded in 1893 by Eleanor Sophia Smith and Amalie Hannig.

== History ==
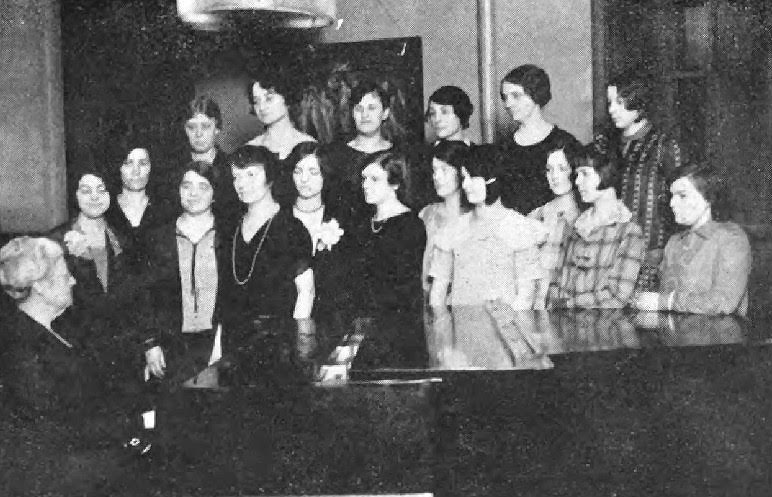
Smith's singing class at Hull House in 1929. Pictured seated at the piano.

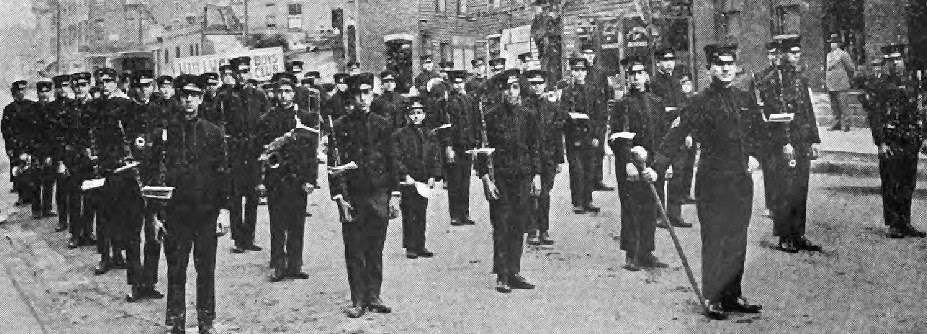
Hull House Boys Band

The Hull House Music School was situated on the fourth floor of the Hull House Children's House. It was started in the fourth year of Hull House's existence, although Smith and Hannig, who were its heads, had almost from the beginning held weekly classes there. From the beginning, they were taught to compose. Instruction was given in piano, organ, violin and singing. Applicants were tested and received at the discretion of the teachers. Occasional public recitals were given. The school was designed to provide a thorough musical education to a limited number of talented children. All pupils admitted to the instrumental department were obliged to enter classes in singing. In addition to Smith and Hannig, teachers included Gertrude Smith (sister of Eleanor), Charles Cornish, and Josephine Trott. Since the beginning of Hull House, a Christmas concert was regularly given on the Sunday of Christmas week; after the establishment of the music school, it was rendered by the Hull House Music School.

== Organ ==
In its second year, a memorial organ was erected at Hull House, which added to the resources of the music school and to the interest of the public concerts which were performed every Sunday afternoon for fifteen years.

== Bibliography ==
- Bliss, William Dwight Porter (1909). The new encyclopedia of social reform, including all social reform movements and activities, and the economic, industrial, and sociological facts and statistics of all countries and all social objects (Public domain ed.). Funk & Wagnalls.
- Cassano (Graham), Lunin Schultz (Rima) and Payette (Jessica) (2019). Eleanor Smith's Hull House Songs. Leiden: Brill. ISBN 978-90-04-28965-9.
- Glowacki, Peggy; Hendry, Julia (2004). Hull-House. Arcadia Publishing. ISBN 978-0-7385-3351-3.
- Howe, Sondra Wieland (November 7, 2013). Women Music Educators in the United States: A History. Scarecrow Press. ISBN 978-0-8108-8848-7.
- Hull House (1902). Bulletin. Vol. VI, Issue 2. Chicago, Illinois: Hull House.
