= Adena Miller Rich =

American social worker (1888–1967)

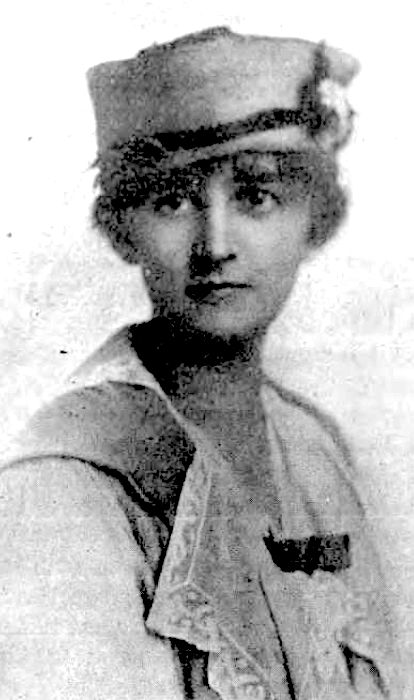
- Adena Miller Rich in 1917, from a 1922 publication
- Born: Emma Adena Miller; October 12, 1888; Erie, Pennsylvania, US
- Died: March 10, 1967 (aged 78)
- Occupations: Social worker, philanthropist, suffragist, activist

Emma Adena Miller Rich (October 12, 1888 – March 10, 1967) was an American social worker, philanthropist, and activist. She was head resident of Hull House from 1935 to 1937, after the death of Jane Addams.

== Early life and education ==
Adena Miller was born in Erie, Pennsylvania, the daughter of Thomas Cassius Miller and Emma Jane Lewis Miller. Her father was a lawyer. Her brother James B. Miller died in the sinking of the RMS Lusitania.

Miller graduated from Oberlin College in 1911. She earned a master's degree at the Chicago School of Civic and Philanthropy.

== Career ==
Rich was civic director of the Women's City Club of Cincinnati in 1916 and 1917. During World War I she was director of Chicago's Girls' Protective Bureau. She made studies of women and crime, and of pre-natal maternal care, in the city. She lived at Hull House in Chicago and worked as secretary to Jane Addams.

Rich was active in the last years of the women's suffrage movement. She was vice-president of the Illinois League of Women Voters from 1923 to 1926, and was director of the Immigrants' Protective League from 1926 to 1954. The Immigrants' Protective League helped immigrants directly, especially women immigrants, to address legal and social issues, and lobbied for less restrictive laws surrounding immigration and citizenship. She worked closely with Julia Lathrop, Grace Abbott, Edith Abbott, Sophonisba Breckinridge, and other prominent social workers in Chicago.

Rich was appointed head resident of Hull House in 1935, after Jane Addams died. She resigned in 1937, replaced by Charlotte E. Carr. During World War II, she served on the Illinois War Finance Committee. She also served on the board of trustees of Oberlin College in her later years.

== Personal life ==
Adena Miller married stockbroker Kenneth Fletcher Rich, who taught math classes at Hull House, in 1917. She retired to a farm in La Crosse, Indiana. in 1954. Her husband died in 1962, and she died in 1967, aged 78 years. The Adena Miller Rich papers are in the University of Illinois at Chicago Library.
