= Hull-House Kilns =

American pottery company

Hull-House Kilns pottery bowl

Hull-House Kilns was a commercial enterprise that created hand-made dinnerware and decorative ceramics. It was known for is Mexican inspired colors, specifically an orange-red glaze.

Hull-House Kilns was established as part of the Chicago settlement house, Hull House. The program was developed by the potter Myrtle Merritt French (1886-1970). She began teaching pottery at Hull House in 1924. The classes were first attended by Mexican immigrants in Chicago, and then by African Americans. A notable potter working at Hull-House Kilns was Jesús Torres.

By 1927 the enterprise began producing pottery commercially. The workshop was located in the Boys’ Club Building of the settlement house. The pottery was sold through the Hull House store on Michigan Avenue in Chicago, and through Macy's department store in New York City. Hull-House pottery can be considered a precursor to Fiesta dinnerware. In 1937 Hull-House Kilns closed. It was unable to remain viable during the Great Depression and the rise of larger commercial pottery operations.

In 2000 the University of Illinois Chicago held an exhibit entitled Pots of Promise: Mexicans and Pottery at Hull-House, 1920-40. The accompanying catalogue was published by the University of Illinois Press.

Examples of Hull-House Kilns pottery are in the Art Institute of Chicago and the Hull House Museum.
