= Cornelia De Bey =

American reformer, homeopathic doctor, school administrator, labor advocate

Dr. Cornelia De Bey
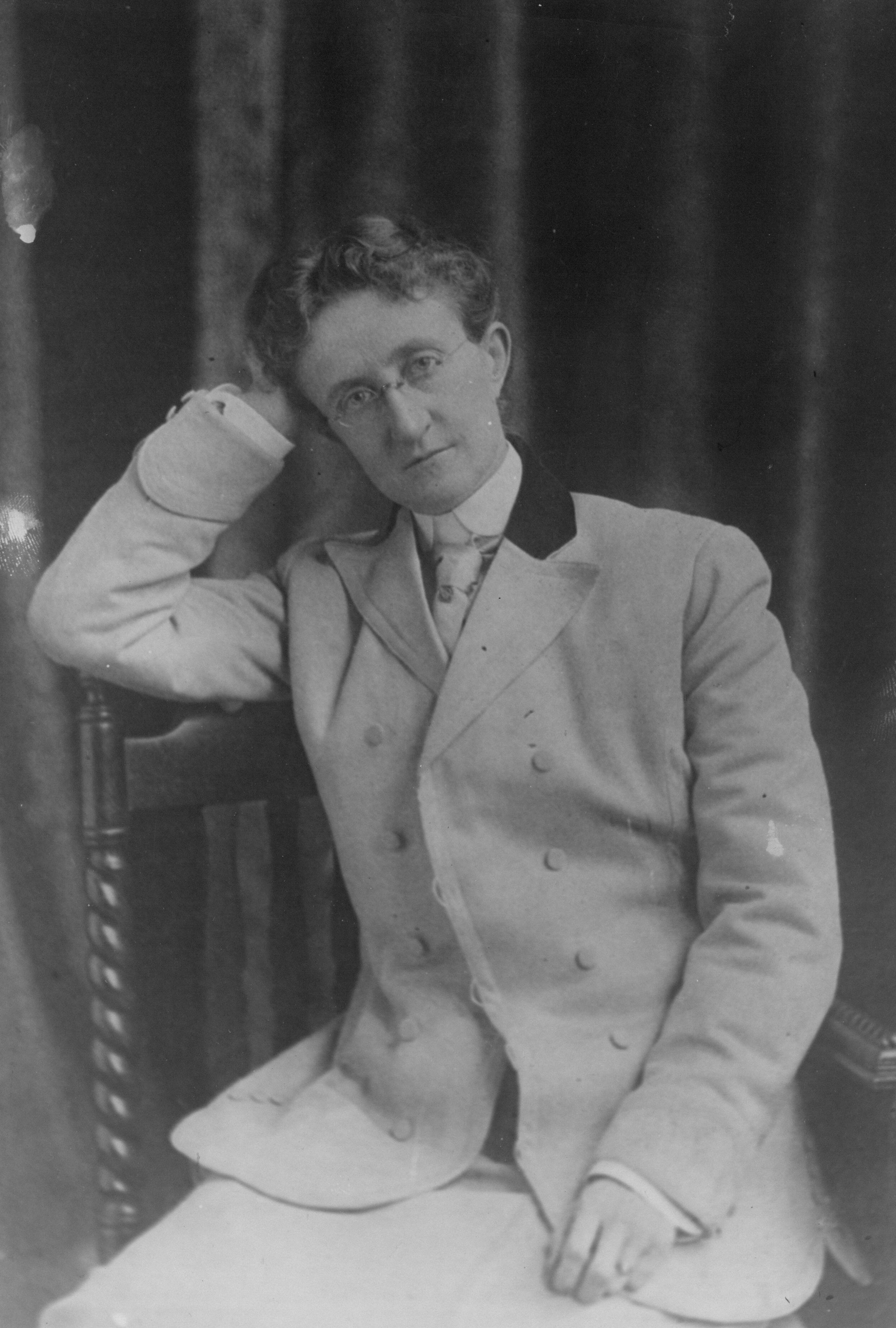
- Born: May 26, 1865; Groningen, Netherlands
- Died: April 3, 1948 (aged 82); Grand Rapids, Michigan
- Education: Cook County Normal School
- Known for: Hull House

Dr. Cornelia De Bey (May 26, 1865 – April 3, 1948) was a Progressive Era reformer, homeopathic doctor, Chicago public school administrator, labor advocate, and leader in the women's suffrage movement. She worked with the famous Hull House community of social reformers, including Jane Addams, Julia Lathrop, Alice De Wolf Kellogg, and Ellen Gates Starr. She advocated for major school administration reform, exposing corruption, advocating for more democratic decision-making, and defending the unionization of teachers.

== Early life and education ==
De Bey was born in the Dutch seaport town of Groningen. Her father, Dr. Bernardus B. De Bey, was a minister and a professor at the University of Groningen. In 1868, when Cornelia was three years old, the family moved to Chicago, Illinois, so that Bernardus could serve as minister to the First Reformed Church of Chicago, a Dutch congregation. De Bey remained in Chicago for the remainder of her life, immersing herself in the politics of the Progressive Era in Chicago.

De Bey received her education at Cook County Normal School, a teacher-training school in Illinois responsible for training Chicago's teachers. She then pursued her medical degree at the Hahnemannian Medical College in Chicago. After graduating in 1895, she began working with Jane Addams at Hull House, a settlement house in Chicago that serviced many people and neighborhoods in Chicago.

== Reform work and The Women's Trade Union League (WTUL) ==
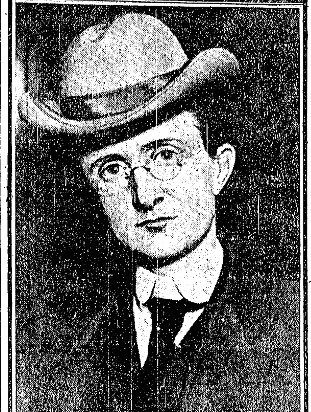
Dr. Cornelia De Bey

De Bey was involved in the Settlement House Movement, a reform movement which prioritized women's involvement in Progressive Era reforms. Women working in the settlement movement in the United States focused on education, cleanliness and health awareness, as well as providing daycare for working mothers. Many women taught adult-education classes to immigrants. De Bey was also involved in the Women's Trade Union League (WTUL), a reform movement led by Progressive-Era women including Jane Addams. This organization was strongly feminist, and was closely tied with the Settlement House Movement. The WTUL worked to establish the eight-hour workday and a minimum wage, as well as the abolition of child labor. The leaders and members supported the female garment industry workers during the garment industry strikes between 1910 and 1911. De Bey and other members of the Settlement House Movement were involved in the WTUL and other Progressive Era Reform movements because they were educated middle and upper-middle-class women, and they felt morally responsible for helping others that were less fortunate than them.

== Later years ==
De Bey moved to California in 1927 when she retired, then returning to Michigan where she died in 1948. She was buried in Holland, Michigan at the Pilgrim Home Cemetery.
