= Josephine Trott =

Josephine Augusta Trott (December 24, 1874 - March 2, 1950) was an American author, composer, and music educator who sometimes wrote under the pseudonym Colin Shepherd. Her violin pedagogy books are still in use today.

Trott was born in Wilmington, Illinois, to Dr. Stenson E. and Augusta J. Trott. Although she never married, she adopted a daughter, Riccarda McQuie, who went on to play violin in the Denver Symphony for 29 years. Trott's book, On Demande une Maman, published under her pseudonym Colin Shepherd, was actually a fictionalized version of McQuie's story.

Trott taught at the Hull House Music School, which was established in Chicago in 1893. She also studied and taught violin in Berlin and Paris. She lived in Denver during the 1920s where she maintained a studio on Humboldt Street. During this time, Trott helped established the Civic Symphony, which then became the Denver Symphony and today is the Colorado Symphony. The Denver Symphony gave its first performance on May 4, 1922. In 1932, Trott published an English translation of a French book on William the Conqueror by Lucie Delarue-Mardrus.

Trott died in Topeka, Kansas. She left the royalties from her publications to the Josephine Trott Memorial Scholarship Fund of the National Federation of Music Clubs. Her music was published by G. Schirmer Inc., Clayton F. Summy Co., and Weekes & Co. Her publications include:

== Article/Books ==
- Book of the Beastie (with Ruth Ewing)
- Deux Enfants du Far West (in French)
- George Hamlin, American Singer, 1868-1923
- Jean Kay in Paris
- On Demande une Maman (in French)
- "Teaching Violin to Small Children" (article in The Violinist Oct 1908)

== Works for the violin ==
- 28 Melodious Studies in the First Position
- Daily Scale Studies for the Violin Books 1 and 2 (in English and Spanish)
- In a Spanish Garden
- Melodious Double Stops
- Melodious Foundation Studies
- Puppet Show, opus 5 no. 1 (violin and piano)
- Studies in Shifting
- Two Tuneful Sketches (violin and piano)
