= Enella Benedict =

American painter

- Born: December 21, 1858; Lake Forest, Illinois
- Died: April 6, 1942 (aged 83); Richmond, Virginia
- Education: School of the Art Institute of Chicago, Art Students League of New York, Academie Julien
- Known for: Painting
- Movement: Realism, Impressionism

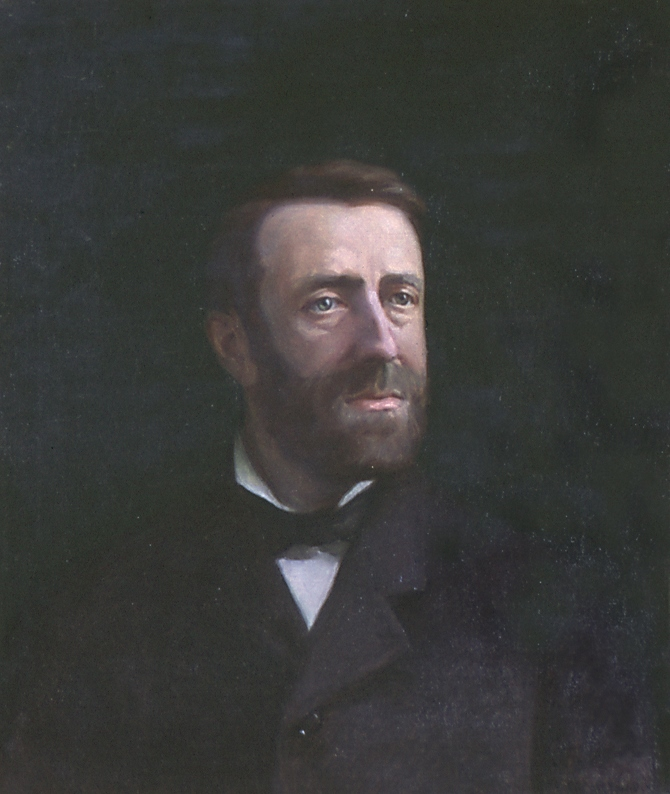
Enella Benedict, William Tomlinson Plant,1885, Health Sciences Library, Upstate Medical University

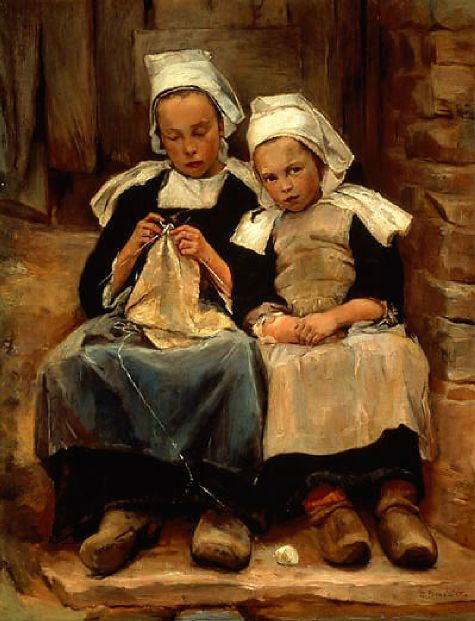
Enella Benedict, Brittany Children, 1892, exhibited in the 1893 Columbian World's Exposition, National Museum of Women in the Arts

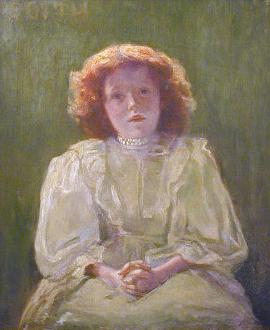
Enella Benedict, Edith, 1895, Jane Addams Hull-House Museum

Enella Benedict (December 21, 1858 – April 6, 1942) was an American realism and landscape painter. She taught at the School of the Art Institute of Chicago and was a founder and director for nearly 50 years for the Art School at the Hull House.

== Early life and education ==
Enella Benedict was born in Lake Forest, Illinois, the daughter of cloth merchant Amzi and Catherine Walmath Benedict. Amzi Benedict was with the Field, Benedict & Company firm and was a city council member and mayor of Lake Forest. Her younger siblings included Caroline, Albert, Sydney and Kate.

Benedict attended Lake Forest University, where she studied painting and drawing and was a junior in 1876.

She studied art at the School of the Art Institute of Chicago and the Art Students League of New York. She then traveled to Paris, France, to study at the Académie Julian. Despite being at a prestigious academy, as a female student, she received less rigorous training and was charged more for tuition compared to male students. As a woman, she was often isolated from other students.

== Career ==
Benedict made oil and watercolor portrait, figure, landscapes and urban scene paintings. Benedict's drawing and painting style was influenced by Realism and Impressionism in which she painted and drew individuals she encountered around her, such as residents of Hull House and local peasants, along with seascapes and rural landscapes.

In 1892, she became the founder and director of the Art School at Hull House.

In the 19th century a women's movement began to promote education, autonomy, and break into traditionally male dominated occupations. Organizations led by women, bonded by sisterhood, were formed for social reform, including settlement houses in working class and poor neighborhoods, like Hull House. To develop "new roles for women, the first generation of New Women wove the traditional ways of their mothers into the heart of their brave new world. The social activists, often single, were led by educated, often single New Women.

Benedict lived at Hull House, as did Jane Addams, and supported the Art School program for almost 50 years, teaching clay modeling, drawing, painting and lithography. She managed the artist-in-residence program and other teachers. The art program, led by social reformer Benedict, was intended to offer education and cultural opportunities to disadvantaged neighborhood residents, having promoting some labor professions as art forms, such as textile fields. Benedict created opportunities for artists to exhibit their works, including the Art Institute of Chicago. Reported in Pots of Promise: Mexicans and Pottery at Hull-House, 1920-40: "In proportion to enrollment, there probably have been more exhibiting artists who started in its classes than in most other schools in the country."

Enella Benedict was committed to the principle that art should not be a luxury for the wealthy, that it could be used as an instrument for social change. Benedict believed that art could improved the lives of Nineteenth Ward residents burdened by long work days and difficult conditions by providing beauty and offering opportunities for creative expression. For as little as 15 cents a day, anyone could take art class at Hull-House, and many students went on to study at the School of the Art Institute.

— Enella Benedict biography, University of Illinois, Chicago

While at Hull House, she also taught at the School of The Art Institute of Chicago, Benedict published a column entitled Ms. Benedict Knows about stories about Hull House. where she worked in the mornings which provided income so that she could work afternoons at Hull House without taking payment. She often traveled to Europe during the summers.

Benedict exhibited her work at the Palace of Fine Arts, the Illinois Building, and The Woman's Building at the 1893 World's Columbian Exposition in Chicago, Illinois. Her work was exhibited at the Art Institute of Chicago given by the Art Students League of Chicago and other exhibitions. An art gallery at Hull House was dedicated in her name to promote the work of its artists In 1938 a retrospective was held of her work was held at Benedict Gallery.

She was a member of the Palette Club in Chicago. Her works are in the collections at Hull House, Rockford Art Museum in Illinois, National Museum of Women in the Arts and the Smithsonian Institution.

== Death ==
Benedict died on April 6, 1942, in Richmond Virginia.

== Works ==
- A Foot Path, watercolor, exhibited in 1895 of the Art Students League at the Art Institute of Chicago.
- Brittany Children, exhibited in 1893 Columbian World's Exposition, National Museum of Women in the Arts
- Counting the Ships, exhibited in 1893 Columbian World's Exposition
- Daily Bread, exhibited in 1893 Columbian World's Exposition
- Evening in the Village, exhibited 1901 Pennsylvania Academy of the Fine Arts
- Greek Easter Procession on Halstead Street (Chicago, Illinois), pastel, 1907, Annual American Exhibition, Art Institute of Chicago
- Landscape
- Old Stories, exhibited in 1893 Columbian World's Exposition
- Salt Marsh and Cedars, watercolor, exhibited in 1895 of the Art Students League at the Art Institute of Chicago.
- The many, pastel, 1907, Annual American Exhibition, Art Institute of Chicago
- Young Boy at Work
- William Tomlinson Plant
