= Spanish Governor's Palace =

Historic house in Texas, United States

- U.S. National Register of Historic Places
- U.S. National Historic Landmark
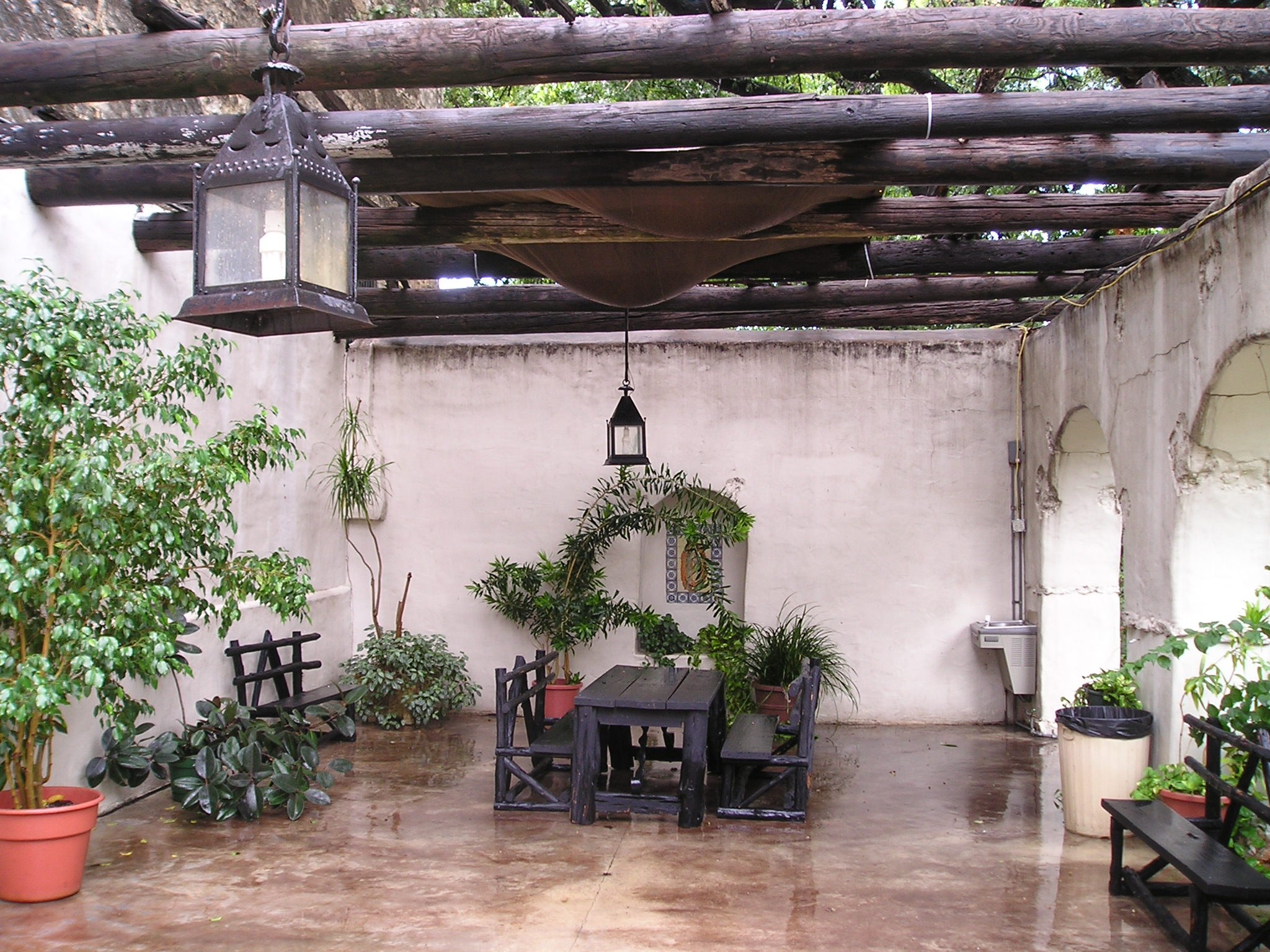
- Courtyard patio with pergola.

- Location within Texas
- Interactive map showing the location of Spanish Governor’s Palace
- Location: San Antonio, Texas, USA
- Coordinates: 29°25′30″N 98°29′45″W
- Built: 1749
- NRHP reference No.: 70000741

Significant dates
- Added to NRHP: April 15, 1970
- Designated NHL: April 15, 1970

The Spanish Governor's Palace is a historic adobe from the Spanish Texas period located in Downtown San Antonio.

It is the last visible trace of the 18th-century colonial Presidio San Antonio de Béxar complex, and the only remaining example in Texas of an aristocratic 18th-century Spanish Colonial in−town residence. The National Geographic Society has named the landmark "the most beautiful building in San Antonio." The building was designated a National Historic Landmark in 1970. It is now owned by the city, and is open to the public as a museum.

== History ==
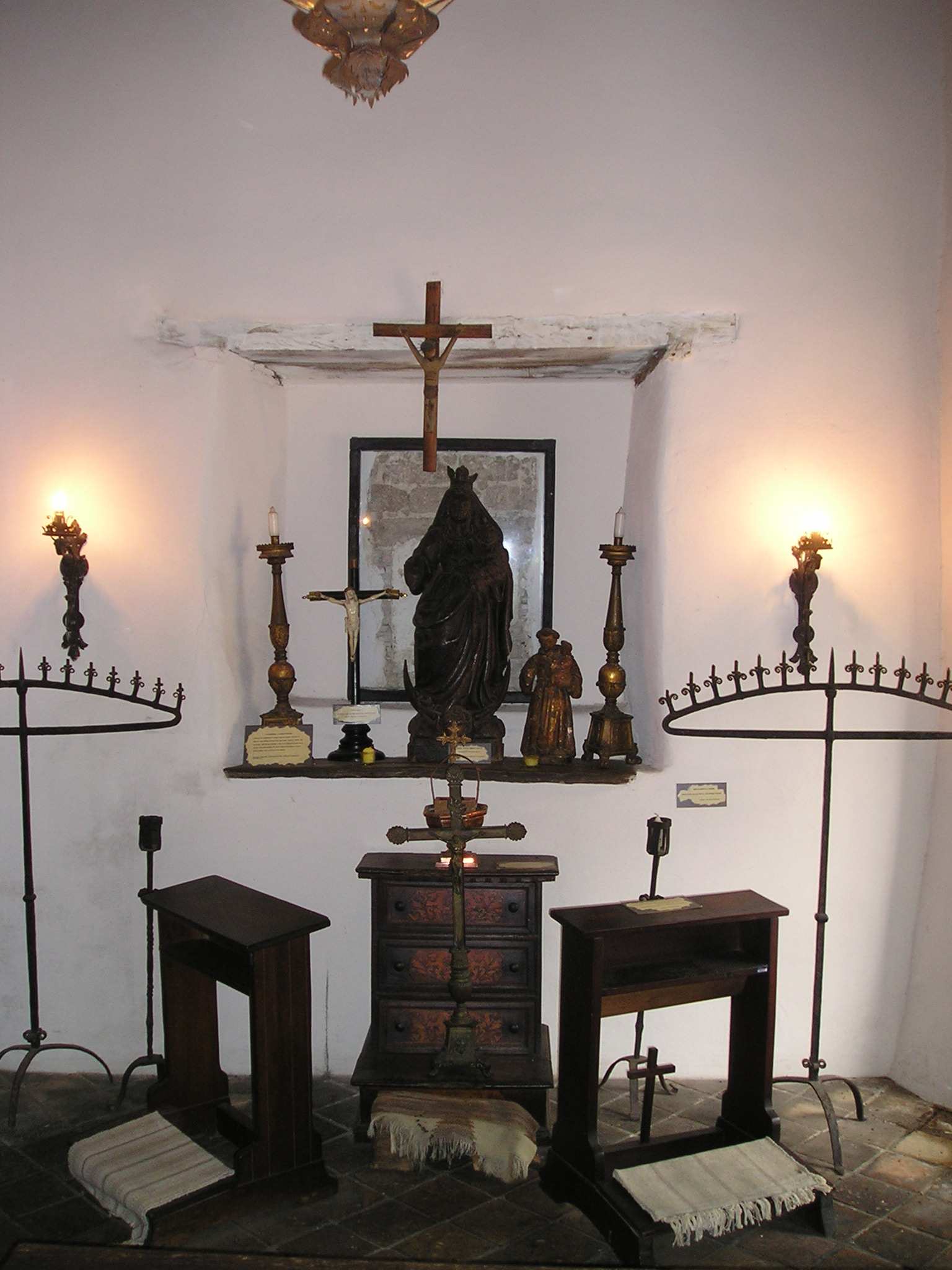
San Antonio Spanish Governor's Palace interior.

The building was constructed in the early 18th century, planned as early as 1722 and completed in 1749. The keystone above the front entrance is marked with the coat-of-arms of Spanish King Ferdinand VI and the date 1749. The building was the residence and working offices of the local presidio captain at first. Later, it became the home of the Spanish governors who lived in San Antonio. The building later became the capitol building of the Texas region of Spanish Texas in 1772.

The Spanish built the Presidio San Antonio de Béxar to protect the area's missions, including the San Antonio de Valero Mission (The Alamo) and the missions in the present day San Antonio Missions National Historical Park, as well as the growing Spanish colony.

== Description and location ==
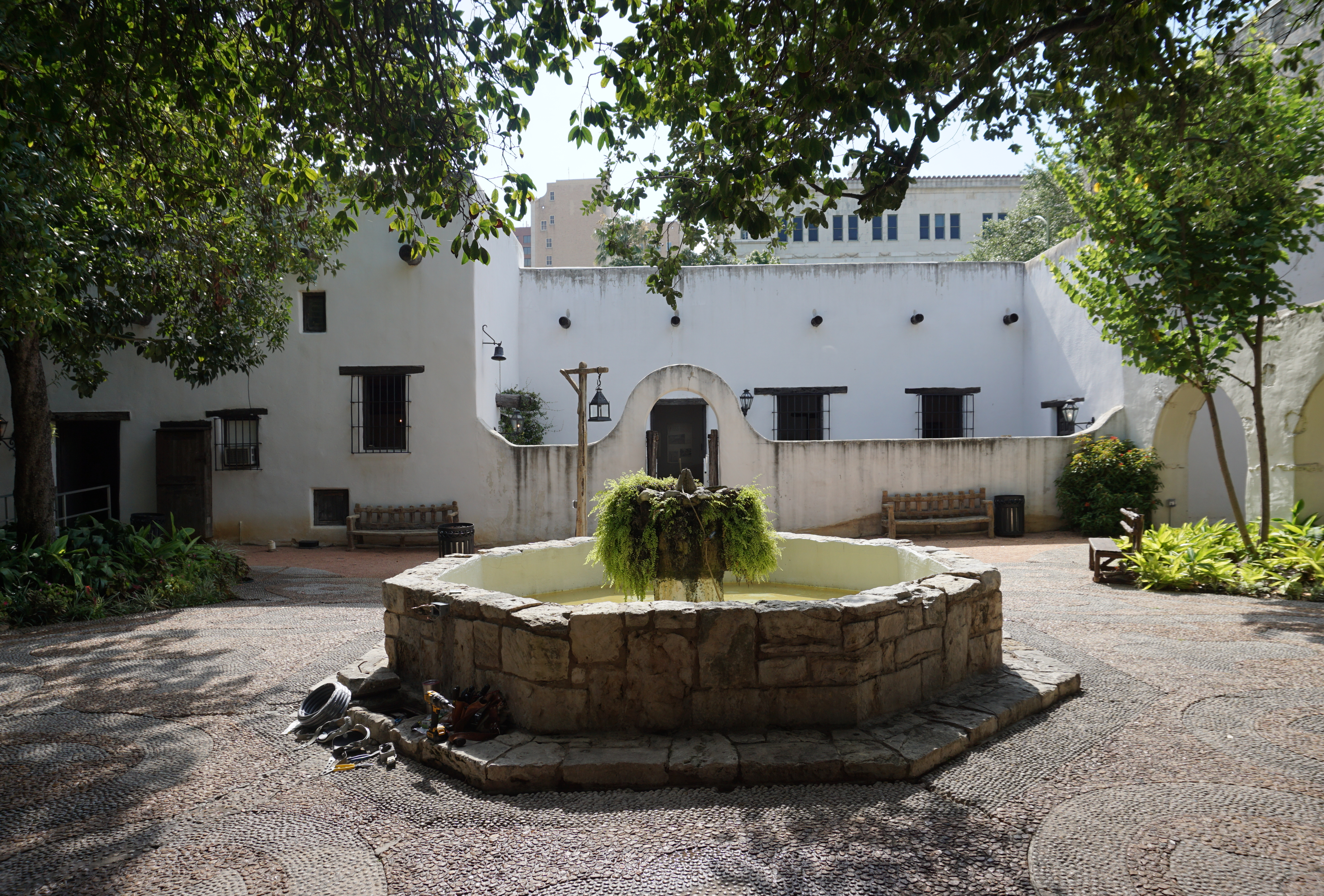
Garden outside the Spanish Governor's Palace

The one-story masonry and stucco structure features ten rooms, a grand courtyard and a fountain, and is alleged to be haunted.

The palace is located in between Market Square and the San Antonio River Walk near the current city hall. The address is 105 Plaza de Armas, San Antonio.

== See also ==
- Palace of the Governors
