= Interval recognition =

Ability to name and reproduce musical intervals

Interval recognition, the ability to name and reproduce musical intervals, is an important part of ear training, music transcription, musical intonation and sight-reading.

== Reference songs ==
Some music teachers teach their students relative pitch by having them associate each possible interval with the first interval of a popular song. Such songs are known as "reference songs". However, others have shown that such familiar-melody associations are quite limited in scope, applicable only to the specific scale-degrees found in each melody.

Here are some examples for each interval:

0/unison	"America the Beautiful" (on "Oh beautiful")'; "God Save the King"/"My Country, 'Tis of Thee"; "Hava Nagila"; "Jingle Bells"; "La Marseillaise"; "One Note Samba"; "Twinkle, Twinkle, Little Star" (on "twin-kle")			
Steps/interval	Ascending		Descending	
1/minor second	"Rule, Britannia!"; "As time goes by"; "Maquillaje" by Mecano; Theme of the One Ring from The Lord of the Rings; Theme from Jaws; "Nice Work If You Can Get It"; "Isn't She Lovely"; Ode to Joy (2nd and 3rd notes); "The Pink Panther Theme"	C↑C♯	"Stella by Starlight"; "Joy to the World"; "Für Elise"; Theme from Jurassic Park; Wedding March (Mendelssohn); “Óleo de mujer con sombrero" by Silvio Rodríguez	C↓B
2/major second	"Frère Jacques"; "Rudolph the red-nosed reindeer"; "Silent Night"; "Never Gonna Give You Up"; "Strangers in the Night"; "Do-Re-Mi"; "Happy Birthday to You"	C↑D	"Mary Had a Little Lamb"; "Three Blind Mice"'; "Satin Doll"; "The First Noel"; "Pictures at an exhibition" by Modest Mussorgsky	C↓B♭
3/minor third	"The Sound of Silence" by Simon and Garfunkel; "A Cruel Angel's Thesis" (theme from Neon Genesis Evangelion); "Axel F" (the Beverly Hills Cop theme song); "Greensleeves"; "Smoke on the Water"; "O Canada"; "The Impossible Dream"; "So Long, Farewell"; "Oh where, oh where has my little dog gone"; "Iron Man" by Black Sabbath; "Bad"; "Brahms's Lullaby"; "Hallelujah"	C↑E♭	"Hey Jude"; "The Star-Spangled Banner"; "Frosty the Snowman"; "Te Diré" by Miguel Bosé; "This Old Man"; "Can We Fix It?" from Bob the Builder; "Rain Rain Go Away"	C↓A
4/major third	"When the Saints Go Marching In"; "Spring" from Vivaldi's "Four Seasons"; "Kumbaya"; "And did those feet in ancient time"; "O mio babbino caro"; "Little Talks"; "Here, There and Everywhere" by The Beatles	C↑E	"Summertime"; "Swing Low, Sweet Chariot"; "Goodnight, Ladies"; Beethoven's Symphony No. 5 (first movement); "Vois sur ton chemin" from “Les Choristes”; "Stressed out” by Twenty one pilots (when it says, “wish we could TURN BACK time”)	C↓A♭
5/perfect fourth	"Auld Lang Syne"; "O Tannenbaum/Oh Christmas Tree"; Here Comes the Bride; "Amazing Grace"	C↑F	Eine kleine Nachtmusik; "O Come, All Ye Faithful"; Theme from Dynasty; “Marcha Real”; "Big Ben chime” (or “Let 'em in” by Paul McCartney, which has the same tune at the beginning	C↓G
6/tritone	"Maria" from West Side Story; "The Simpsons Theme"	C↑F♯	"YYZ"; "Black Sabbath"; "Danse Macabre" by "Camille Saint-Saëns"; "Even Flow"	C↓F♯
7/perfect fifth	Also sprach Zarathustra; "Can't Help Falling in Love" (on Wise Men); "My Favorite Things"; "Scarborough Fair"; Theme from Star Wars; "Twinkle, Twinkle, Little Star" (from 1st to 2nd "twinkle"); "Yeah!"	C↑G	Back to the Future Theme; "Don't You (Forget About Me)" chorus; The Flintstones Theme; "Seven Steps to Heaven"; "What Do You Do With A Drunken Sailor?"; Halloween Theme; The Final Countdown intro, by the band "Europe".	C↓F
8/minor sixth	"In my life” by “The Beatles"; "Go Down Moses" on "When Is[-rael]"; Theme of 1492: Conquest of Paradise; "The Entertainer" (big interval after pick-up); "Close Every Door"; "Nothing Compares 2 U"	C↑A♭	"You're Everything" from Light as a Feather; "Where Do I Begin?" from the film Love Story; "Call Me Maybe"	C↓E
9/major sixth	"El día que me quieras" by Carlos Gardel; "Gabriel's Oboe" (on the “chorus/climax”) by “Ennio Morricone” from the film “The Mission”; "For He's a Jolly Good Fellow"; "It Came Upon the Midnight Clear"; "Jingle Bells" (on "dash-ing through the snow"); "Leia's Theme" (from Star Wars); "Libiamo ne' lieti calici", brindisi from Verdi's 1853 opera La traviata; "My Bonnie Lies over the Ocean"; "My Way"; NBC chimes	C↑A	"Man in the Mirror" (chorus); "The Music of the Night"; "Nobody Knows the Trouble I've Seen"; "Over There"; "Until I Found You" by Stephen Sanchez; "Sweet Caroline"	C↓E♭
10/minor seventh	Theme from Star Trek; "Somewhere" from West Side Story; "The Winner Takes It All"	C↑B♭	"Watermelon Man"; "An American in Paris"; "Lady Jane" (refrain)	C↓D
11/major seventh	"Take On Me"; Theme from Fantasy Island; Theme from Superman; "The Pajama Game"	C↑B	"I Love You"; “Have Yourself a Merry Little Christmas (Nat King Cole)”; "Maybe"	C↓D♭
12/octave	"Over the Rainbow"; "Blue Bossa"; "The Christmas Song"; "Starman"; "Let It Snow! Let It Snow! Let It Snow!"; "Heigh-Ho” from “Snow White"; "When You Wish Upon a Star"; "The Sound of Silence” by Simon and Garfunkel (when it says: AND THE, VISION); "Don't Look Back In Anger"	C↑C	"Willow Weep for Me"	C↓C

In addition, there are various solmization systems (including solfeggio, sargam, and numerical sight-singing) that assign specific syllables to different notes of the scale. Among other things, this makes it easier to hear how intervals sound in different contexts, such as starting on different notes of the same scale.
