= Bowen Park (Waukegan) =

- Joseph T. Bowen Country Club
- U.S. National Register of Historic Places
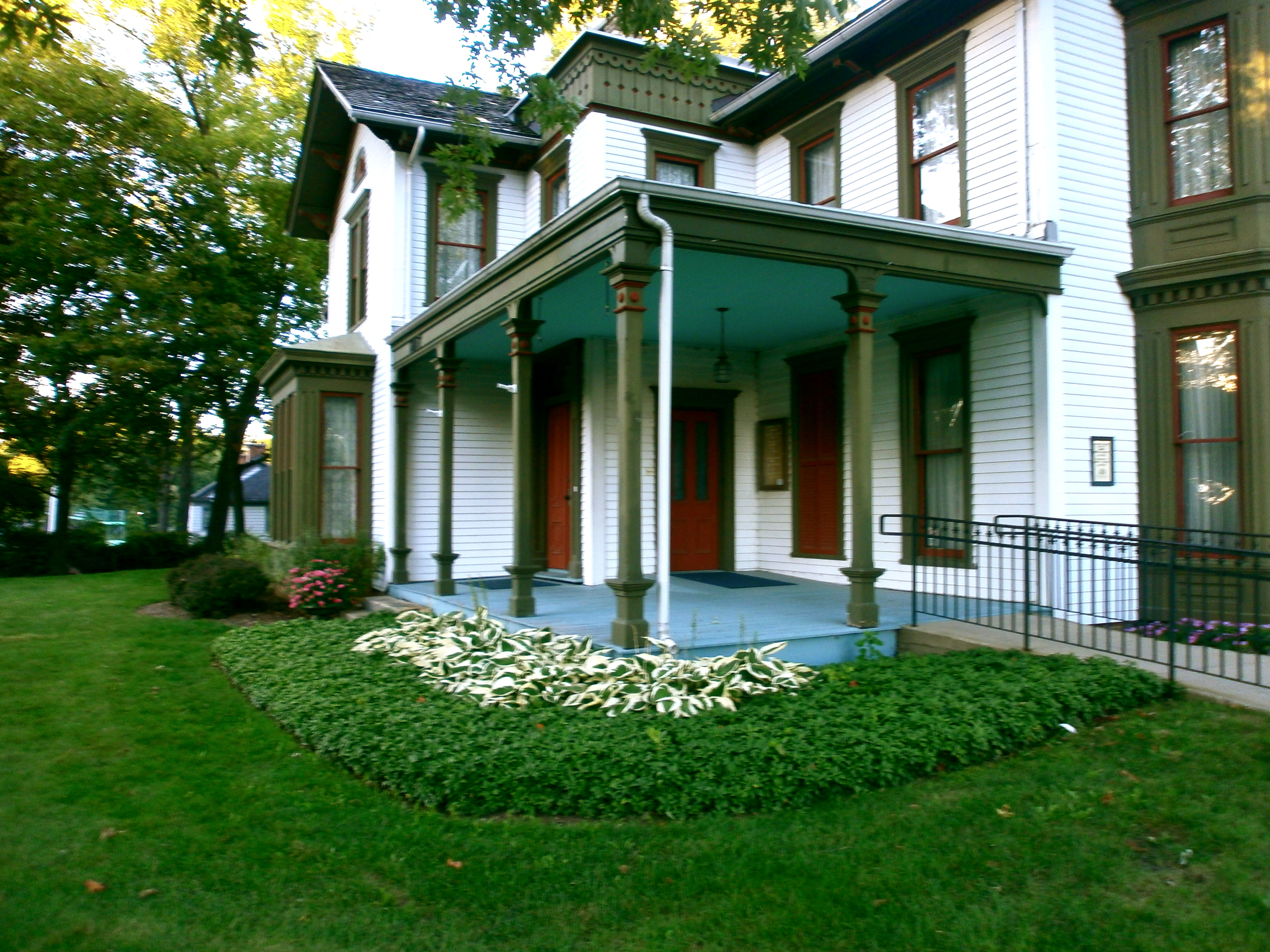

- Location within Illinois Location within the United States
- Location: Bowen Park, 1917 North Sheridan Road, Waukegan, Illinois
- Coordinates: 42°23′10″N 87°49′47″W
- Area: 61.1 acres (24.7 ha)
- Built: 1843
- Website: www.waukeganparks.org/location/bowen-park/
- NRHP reference No.: 78003400
- Added to NRHP: November 30, 1978

Bowen Park is a recreational area in Waukegan, Illinois, along Sheridan Road. It includes an old-growth forest and a ravine. The 60.07-acre (24.31 ha) park was laid out as a residential property in 1843. It was the home of John Charles Haines, a prominent Illinois politician, from 1857 to 1896. In 1911, the Hull House Association renamed it the Joseph T. Bowen Country Club and began using the property as a summer retreat. The land was purchased by the Waukegan Park District in 1963.

== History ==
In 1843, politician James Montgomery built a house on a 72 acres (29 ha) lot of land near present-day Waukegan, Illinois, then known as Little Fort. At some point, the property was transferred to William Fay. In 1857, Fay sold the property to John Charles Haines, who used it as a summer residence. A member of the Chicago City Council, Haines was elected Mayor of Chicago the next year. He served two one-year terms and remained active in Illinois politics for the rest of his life, including a stint in the Illinois Senate. Haines built an addition to the house in the early 1870s. He died there on July 4, 1896. In 1909, the property was purchased by Fred W. Buck, the mayor of Waukegan, who intended to deed it to the city of Waukegan as a park. However, the city rejected the offering because it was too far from downtown.

The property was unused for two years. In 1911, Jane Addams started to look for a new summer camp for the children of Hull House, a settlement house in Chicago. Addams had previously rented land in Wisconsin and Michigan, but these campgrounds suffered from bad weather and a lack of maintenance. A realtor provided Addams with a list of three hundred potential camp properties, so she went on a trip with fellow Hull House administrator Louise DeKoven Bowen to visit sixty-seven candidates. Addams and Bowen purchased the land from Buck on December 11 after seeing the site. They renamed the land the Joseph Tilton Bowen Country Club after Bowen's recently deceased husband.

When the club opened the next year, Bowen had her personal gardener plan a formal gardens, baseball field, vegetable garden, orchard, tennis courts, playground, and croquet club. During the summer, Hull House children attended for two weeks, typically if they were involved in other Hull House activities. Children were asked to pay a nominal fee to help maintain the property and to give them a sense of responsibility. The Chicago and North Western Railway provided free transportation for the children throughout the club's history. Over 40,000 children attended the Bowen Country Club from 1912 to 1963. During the off-season, the club was used for conferences and other private uses.

In 1963, the Hull House Association sold the club to the Waukegan Park District for $360,000; the associated had found a new camp in East Troy, Wisconsin. A ground formed from the Waukegan Area Council of Church, Waukegan Area of the Lake County Welfare Council, and some other local churches were granted a license to use the park for $1,200 per year. The council was dissolved four years later and the Waukegan Park District assumed full operation of the property. In 1987, the park district completed the Jack Benny Center for the Arts, for the Waukegan Symphony Orchestra and Concert Chorus and the Bowen Park Theatre and Opera Company.
