= Hull House =

House in Chicago, Illinois

- U.S. National Register of Historic Places
- U.S. National Historic Landmark
- Chicago Landmark
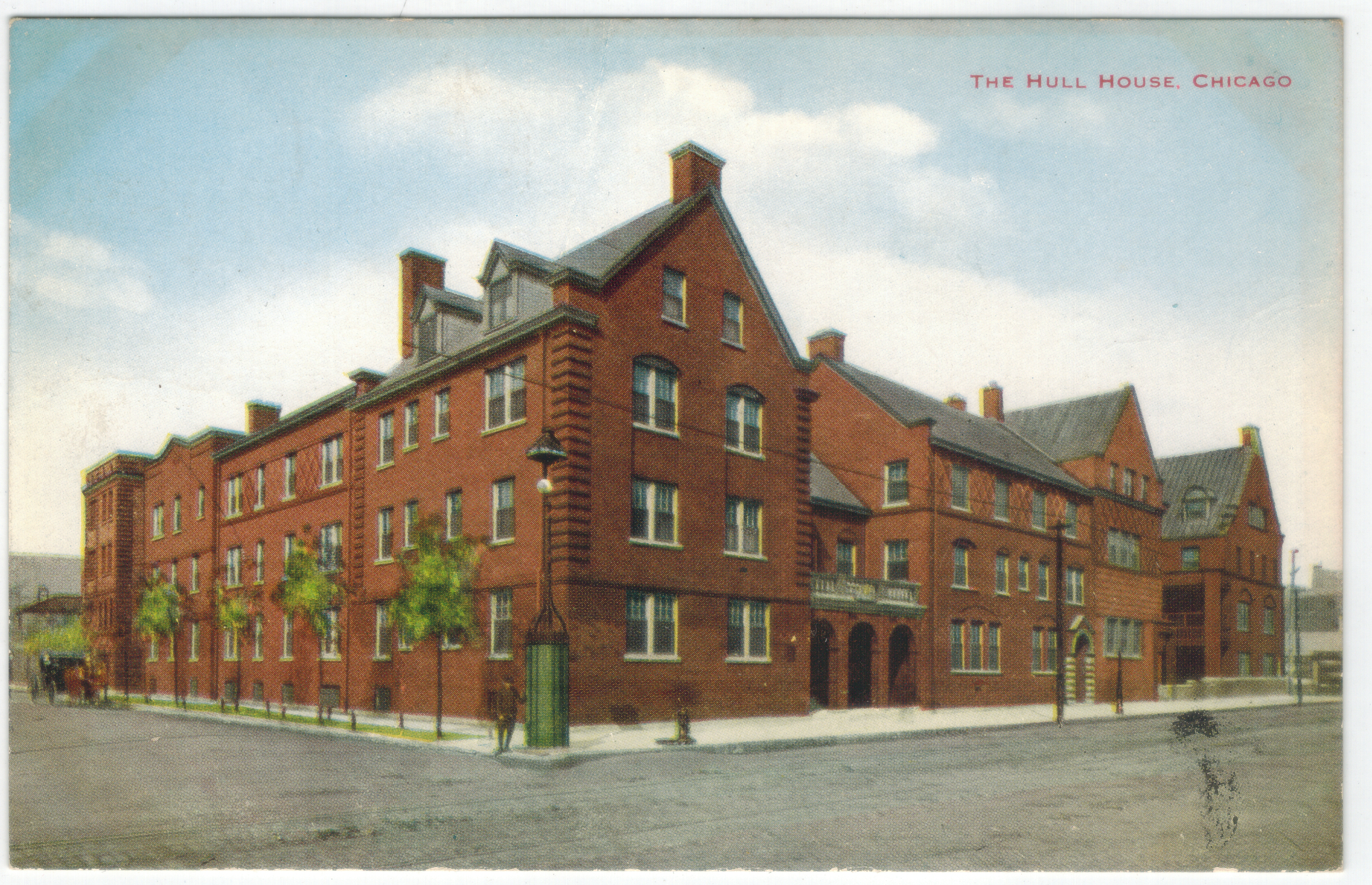
- Hull House in the early 20th century

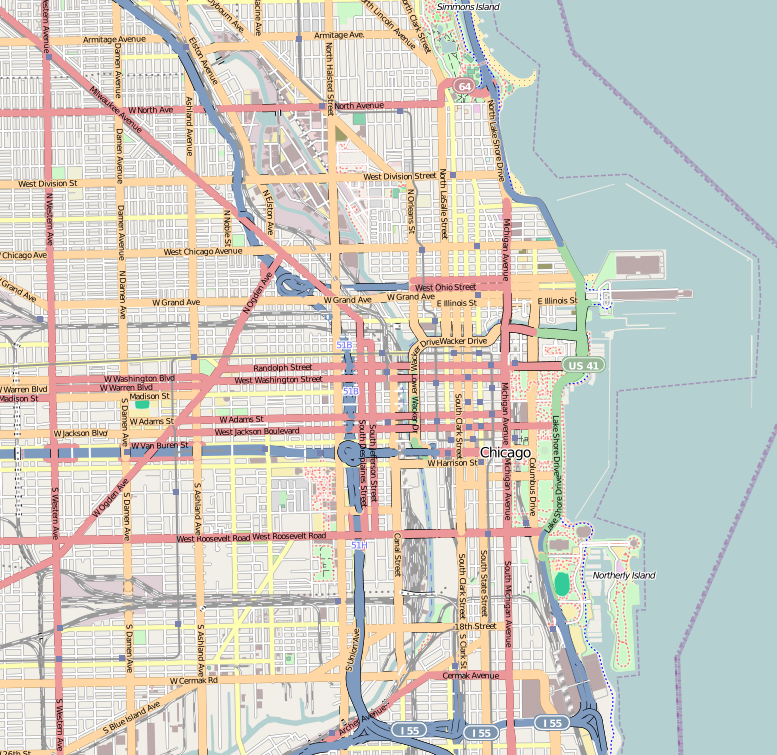
- Location within Central Chicago
- Location: 800 S. Halsted, Chicago, Illinois, U.S.
- Coordinates: 41°52′18″N 87°38′51″W
- Area: 1 acre (0.40 ha)
- Built: building built in 1856, institution founded September 18, 1889
- Architect: Pond and Pond
- Architectural style: Italianate
- NRHP reference No.: 66000315

Significant dates
- Added to NRHP: October 15, 1966
- Designated NHL: June 23, 1965
- Designated CHICL: June 12, 1974

Hull House was a settlement house in Chicago, Illinois, that was co-founded in 1889 by Jane Addams and Ellen Gates Starr. Located on the Near West Side of Chicago, Hull House, named after the original house's first owner Charles Jerald Hull, opened to serve recently arrived European immigrants. By 1911, Hull House had expanded to 13 buildings. In 1912, the Hull House complex was completed with the addition of a summer camp, the Bowen Country Club. With its innovative social, educational, and artistic programs, Hull House became the standard bearer for the movement; by 1920, it grew to approximately 500 settlement houses nationally.

The Hull mansion and several subsequent acquisitions were continuously renovated to accommodate the changing demands of the association. In the mid-1960s, most of the Hull House buildings were demolished for the construction of the University of Illinois Chicago. The original house and one additional building, a community refectory and meeting hall (which has been moved 200 yards (182.9 m)) survive today. On June 23, 1965, it was designated as a U.S. National Historic Landmark. On October 15, 1966, the day that the National Historic Preservation Act of 1966 was enacted, it was listed on the National Register of Historic Places. On June 12, 1974, the surviving Hull mansion was designated as a Chicago Landmark.

Hull House was one of the first four structures to be listed on both the Chicago Registered Historic Places and the National Register of Historic Places list (along with Chicago Pile-1, Robie House, and Lorado Taft Midway Studios). After The Hull House Association moved from the original buildings complex in the 1960s, it continued to provide social services in multiple locations throughout Chicago. It finally ceased operations in January 2012. The Hull mansion and a related dining hall, the only remaining survivors on the Hull House complex, are now maintained as a history museum, the Jane Addams Hull-House Museum.

== Mission ==
Addams followed the example of Toynbee Hall, which was founded in 1884 in the East End of London as a center for social reform. She described Toynbee Hall as "a community of university men" who, while living there, held their recreational clubs and social gatherings at the settlement house among the poor people and in the same style they would in their own circle. Addams and Starr established Hull House as a settlement house on September 18, 1889.

In the 19th century a women's movement began to promote education and autonomy, and to break into traditionally male-dominated occupations for women. Organizations led by women, bonded by sisterhood, were formed for social reform, including settlement houses such as Hull House, situated in working class and poor neighborhoods. To develop "new roles for women, the first generation of New Women wove the traditional ways of their mothers into the heart of their brave new world. The social activists, often single, were led by educated New Women.

Hull House became, at its inception in 1889, "a community of university women" whose main purpose was to provide social and educational opportunities for working class people (many of them recent European immigrants) in the surrounding neighborhood. The "residents" (volunteers at Hull were given this title) held classes in literature, history, art, domestic activities (such as sewing), and many other subjects. Prominent scholars and social reformers such as John Dewey, George Herbert Mead, Max Weber, and W.E.B. Du Bois lectured at Hull House. In addition, Hull House held concerts that were free to everyone, offered free lectures on current issues, and operated clubs for both children and adults.

In 1892, Addams published her thoughts on what has been described as "the three R's" of the settlement house movement: residence, research, and reform. These involved "close cooperation with the neighborhood people, scientific study of the causes of poverty and dependence, communication of these facts to the public, and persistent pressure for [legislative and social] reform..." Hull House conducted careful studies of the Near West Side, Chicago community, which became known as "The Hull House Neighborhood". These studies enabled the Hull House residents to confront the establishment, eventually partnering with them in the design and implementation of programs intended to enhance and improve the opportunities for success by the largely immigrant population.

According to Christie and Gauvreau (2001), while the Christian settlement houses sought to Christianize, Addams "had come to epitomize the force of secular humanism." Her image was, however, "reinvented" by the Christian churches. According to the Jane Addams Hull-House Museum, "Some social settlements were linked to religious institutions. Others, like Hull-House [co-founded by Addams], were secular."

In 1895, the Hull-House Association released "Hull-House Maps and Papers." This publication consisted of essays authored by Hull-House residents and collaborators, overseen by Addams. Alongside the essays, the book featured two maps illustrating the spatial distribution of immigrants from eighteen different nationalities residing within a one-third square mile radius around Hull-House. "The book was notable for its impact on the University of Chicago Sociology Department ... Development of mapping as a statistical technique to reveal social group patterns became a major contribution of the Chicago School."

Settlement houses were established on the principles of Christian Socialism and the Social Gospel, which held the belief that the application of social sciences could address the challenges faced by urban residents in industrialized societies. Addams strongly asserted that the primary beneficiaries of the efforts at the settlement house were the residents themselves, rather than the local community. Nevertheless, she recognized that to effectively tackle these issues, it was essential to comprehend them thoroughly. Consequently, she mobilized teams to investigate social problems in the vicinity of Hull-House.

Hassencahl asserts that Hull-House evolved into a globally significant hub of intellectual activity, attracting leaders from various fields to engage in teaching, studying, and research. Deegan further elaborates that for women sociologists, Hull-House held a similar significance as the University of Chicago did for their male counterparts, serving as a central institution for research and social discourse. Alongside disseminating their discoveries, the insights derived from these inquiries played a crucial role in advocating for legislative reforms aimed at improving the conditions of immigrants and the impoverished.

Addams didn't intend to become a sociologist. In the preface of Hull-House Maps and Papers, she mentioned that the residents of the settlement house typically didn't engage in sociological inquiries, which she distinguished from investigations into labor abuses or factory conditions. She expressed her opposition to viewing the neighborhood as a laboratory, emphasizing that Hull-House aimed to assist the neighbors rather than study them. However, she ended up becoming a sociologist. Faderman describes Addams as "probably the first to take the work of female social scientists seriously." She was one of the founding members of the American Sociological Association, established in 1905. Additionally, she lectured on sociology at both the University of Chicago Extension and the Chicago School of Civics and Philanthropy.

Addams' perspective aside, Hull-House represented a form of experimentation. Fortunately, it was replicable. By 1900, nearly 100 settlement houses akin to Hull-House had emerged across the United States. Moreover, Addams spurred a shift in the objectives of existing groups. Women's clubs, initially established by affluent women for cultural enrichment, joined forces to establish the Federation of Women's Clubs, directing their efforts towards civic endeavors such as eradicating child labor, establishing public libraries, and reforming tenements.

During that era, a familiar dichotomy emerged, resonating with contemporary readers. Male members of the University of Chicago Sociology Department tended to maintain a distance from their subjects. They operated from their offices within the university, using coordination for their studies. Women sociologists were often viewed by their male counterparts as mere data collectors. Conversely, women sociologists perceived sociology as a tool. While men regarded the data they gathered and the insights they derived as the ultimate goal, women viewed them as indicators of issues needing resolution. Their envisioned role was that of problem solvers.

Post-World War II, there arose a trend to quantify and "scientify" all aspects of what are now recognized as the social sciences. Consequently, sociology was embraced by business and science, with male faculty assuming predominant roles. By 1920, at the University of Chicago, all female professors were transferred from the Sociology Department to the Department of Social Services.

== Hull House neighborhood ==
One of the first newspaper articles ever written about Hull House quotes the following invitation sent to the residents of the Hull House neighborhood. It begins with: "Mio Carissimo Amico"...and is signed, Le Signorine, Jane Addams and Ellen Starr. That invitation to the community, written during the first year of Hull House's existence, suggests that the inner core of what Addams labeled "The Hull House Neighborhood" was overwhelmingly Italian at that time. "10,000 Italians lived between the river and Halsted Street."

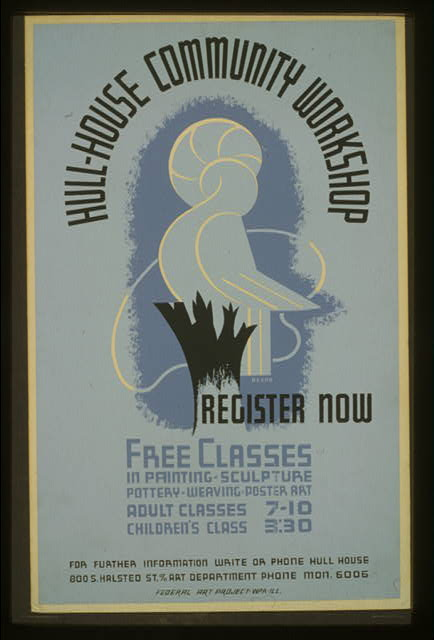
Hull House community workshop poster, 1938

By all accounts, the greater Hull House neighborhood (Chicago's Near West Side) was a mix of various ethnic groups that had immigrated to Chicago. There was no discrimination of race, language, creed, or tradition for those who entered the doors of the Hull House. Every person was treated with respect. The Bethlehem-Howard Neighborhood Center records substantiate that, "Germans and Jews resided south of that inner core (south of twelfth street)...The Greek delta formed by Harrison, Halsted and Blue Island Streets served as a buffer to the Irish residing to the south and the Canadian–French to the northwest. From the river on the east end, on out to the western ends of what came to be known as "Little Italy", from Roosevelt Road on the south to the Harrison Street delta on the north, became the port-of-call for Italians who continued to immigrate to Chicago from the shores of southern Italy until a quota system was implemented in 1924 for most Southern Europeans.

The Greektown and Maxwell Street residents, along with the remnants of other immigrant groups living on the outer fringes of the Hull House Neighborhood, disappeared long before the physical demise of Hull House. The exodus of most ethnic groups began shortly after the turn of the twentieth century. Their businesses, e.g. Greektown and Maxwell Street, however, remained. Italian Americans were the only immigrant group that endured as a vibrant on-going community. That community came to be known as "Little Italy". Taylor Street's Little Italy, the inner core of Addams' "Hull House Neighborhood", remained as the laboratory upon which the social and philanthropic groups of Hull House elitists had tested their theories and formulated their challenges to the establishment.

The synergy between Taylor Street's Little Italy and the Hull House complex; i.e., the settlement house and its summer camp, the Bowen Country Club, is well documented. Dr. Alice Hamilton, an early member of that elite Hull House hierarchy, wrote in her autobiography, "Those Italian women knew what a baby needed, far better than my Ann Arbor professors did." The ancillary literature between, among and about members of Hull House's inner sanctum of sociologists and philanthropists is littered with such comments, reinforcing the relationship that existed between Taylor Street's Little Italy and Hull House. A review of the ethnic composition of those who registered for and utilized the services provided by the Hull House complex, during its 74 years as a tenant of the near-west side, suggests an ethnic bias. Of the 257 known WWII veterans who were alumni of the Bowen Country Club, "virtually all had a vowel at the end of their names...denoting their Italian heritage."

A historic picture, "Meet the Hull House Kids," was taken on a summer day in 1924 by Wallace K. Kirkland Sr., Hull House Director. He later became a top photographer with Life. The twenty Hull House Kids were erroneously described as young boys, of Irish ancestry, posing in the Dante School yard on Forquer Street (now Arthington Street). It circulated the world as a "poster child" of sorts for the Hull House social experiment. On April 5, 1987, over a half century later, the Chicago Sun-Times refuted the contention that the Hull House Boys were of Irish ancestry. In doing so, the Sun-Times article listed the names of each of the young boys. All twenty boys were first-generation Italian-Americans, all with vowels at the end of their names. "They grew up to be lawyers and mechanics, sewer workers and dump truck drivers, a candy shop owner, a boxer and a mob boss."

Because of the immigrants' loneliness for their homeland, Addams started hosting ethnic evenings at Hull House. This would include ethnic food, dancing, music, and maybe a short lecture on a topic of interest. Some of the themed evenings were Italian, Greek, German, Polish, etc. Ellen Gates Starr described one Italian evening as having the room packed full with people. One of the ladies who attended "recited a patriotic poem with great spirit" and everyone was moved by it.

=== Accomplishments ===
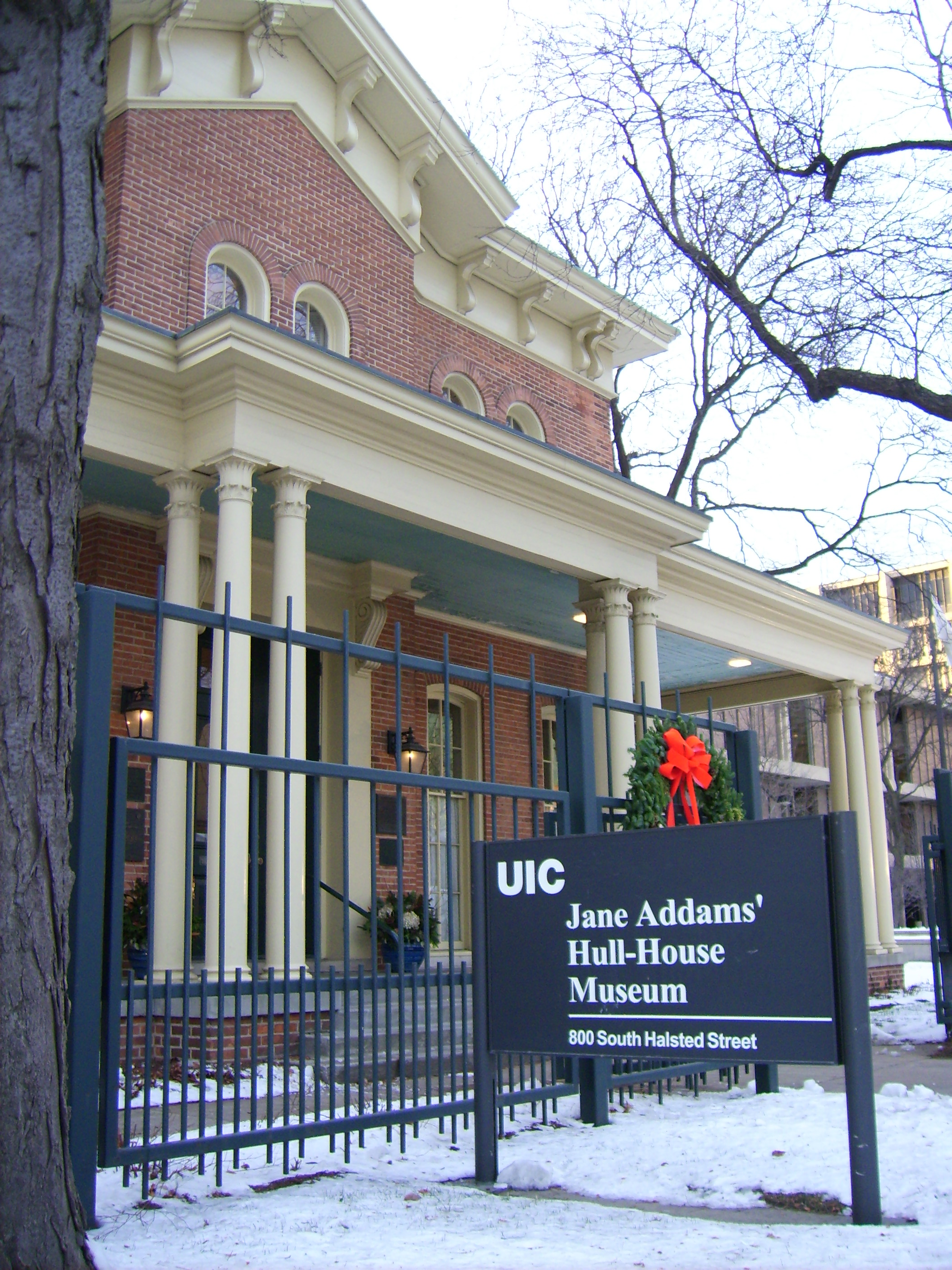
Jane Addams Hull-House Museum in 2006. The museum is located in and preserves the first building from which the Addams settlement took its name, Hull House, and one related structure. Additional settlement facilities, which over-time grew up around the house, were removed in the 1960s.

Throughout the first two decades, along with thousands of immigrants from the surrounding area, Hull House attracted many female residents who later became prominent and influential reformers at various levels. At the beginning, Addams and Starr volunteered as on-call doctors when the real doctors either didn't show up or weren't available. They acted as midwives, saved babies from neglect, prepared the dead for burial, nursed the sick, and sheltered domestic violence victims. For example, one Italian bride had lost her wedding ring and in turn was beaten by her husband for a week. She sought shelter at the settlement and it was granted to her. Also, a baby born with a cleft palate was unwanted by his mother so he was kept at the Hull House for six weeks after an operation. In another case, a woman was about to give birth to an illegitimate baby, so none of the Irish matrons would touch it. Addams and Starr stepped in and delivered this helpless little one. Finally, a female Italian immigrant was so thrilled about fresh roses at one of the Hull House receptions that she insisted they had come from Italy. She had never seen anything as beautiful in America despite the fact that she lived within ten blocks of a florist shop. Her limited view of America came from the untidy street she lived on and the long struggle to adapt to American ways. The settlement was also gradually drawn into advocating for legislative reforms at the municipal, state and federal levels, addressing issues such as child labor, women's suffrage, healthcare reform and immigration policy. Some claim that the work of the Hull House marked the beginning of what we know today as "Social Welfare".

At the neighborhood level, Hull House established the city's first public playground, bathhouse, and public gymnasium (in 1893), pursued educational and political reform, and investigated housing, working, and sanitation issues. The playground opened on May Day in 1893, located on Polk Street. Families dressed in party attire and came to join the celebration that day. Addams had studied child behavior and painfully concluded that "children robbed of childhood were likely to become dull, sullen men and women working mindless jobs, or criminals for whom the adventure of crime became the only way to break out of the bleakness of their lives" Addams' thinking regarding the importance of childhood play opportunities contributed to a national conversation about the need for playgrounds and a movement that started the Playground Association of America Also, one volunteer, Jenny Dow, started a kindergarten class for children left at the settlement while their mothers worked in the sweatshops. Within three weeks, Dow had 24 registered kindergartners and 70 on a waiting list. At the municipal level, their pursuit of legal reforms led to the first juvenile court in the United States, and their work influenced urban planning and the transition to a branch library system. At the state level Hull House influenced legislation on child labor laws, occupational safety and health provisions, compulsory education, immigrant rights, and pension laws. These experiences translated to success at the federal level, working with the settlement house network to champion national child labor laws, women's suffrage, a children's bureau, unemployment compensation, workers' compensation, and other elements of the Progressive agenda during the first two decades of the twentieth century.

Jane Addams and many other Hull House residents such as Florence Kelley and Julia Lathrop inspired and stimulated social reforms. Hull House residents generated action. What is less well known, is that Hull House also generated a unique philosophy often described as feminist pragmatism. Philosophy is generally associated with academia. Plato, is known for establishing the academy (387 BCE), which was a forerunner of universities. Men dominated this world of thought --philosophy. Hull House offered an alternative location where women could debate, reflect, ponder and make sense of urban life through the prism of feminine experience. According to Maurice Hamington Hull House was an incubator of ideas where feminist pragmatism was jump started. The Hull House philosophy, contrasted sharply with the approach of Plato. He used geometry and math as a spring board to a theory of Forms, which were "ideal, eternal, unchanging and pleasingly independence of earthly visible things. Addams, on the other hand, was not interested in abstract truth. She wanted her philosophic approach to incorporate the messy world of lived experience - with emphasis on the under explored world of women's experience. Rather than focusing on fixed individual characteristics (virtues), her social ethics engaged the individual in broader society and focused on a social responsibility and participatory democracy. In 1897, Alice Hamilton after graduating from Johns Hopkins School of Medicine joined Hull House and founded one of the first child welfare and outpatient pediatric clinic.

=== Teachings ===
Hull House

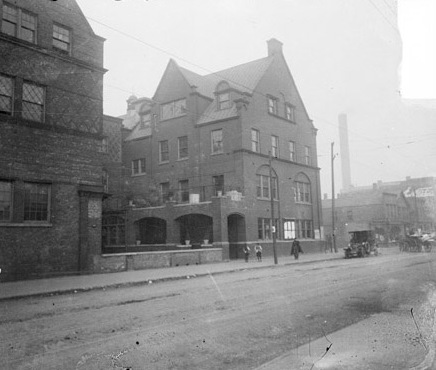
Smith Hall along Halsted St., 1910

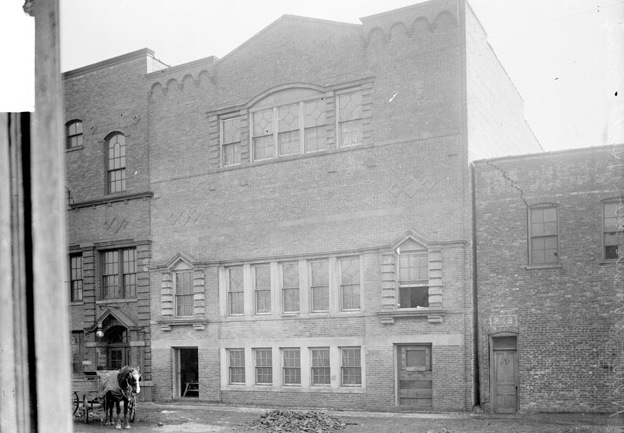
Women's Club building, 1905

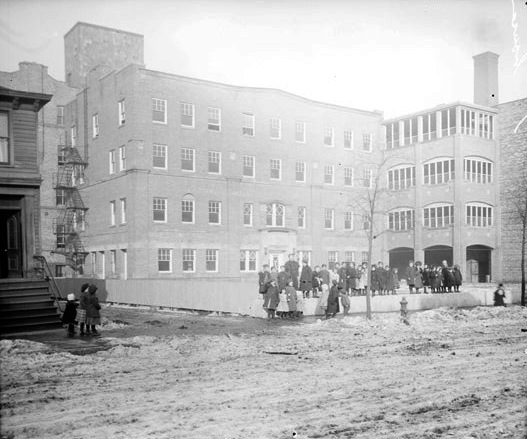
Children in line on a retaining wall at Hull House, 1908

Later, the settlement branched out and offered services to ameliorate some of the effects of poverty. A public dispensary provided nutritious food for the sick as well as a daycare center and public baths. Among the courses Hull House offered was a bookbinding course, which was timely — given the employment opportunities in the growing printing trade. Hull House was well known for its success in aiding American assimilation, especially with immigrant youth. Hull House became the center of the movement to promote hand workmanship as a moral regenerative force. The Hull-House Kilns program was directed by Myrtle Merritt French. Under the direction of Laura Dainty Pelham their theater group performed the Chicago premiers of several plays by John Galsworthy, Henrik Ibsen, and George Bernard Shaw, and was given credit for founding the American Little Theatre Movement. The success of Hull House led Paul Kellogg to refer to the group as the "Great Ladies of Halsted Street".

The objective of Hull House, as stated in its charter, was: "To provide a center for a higher civic and social life; to institute and maintain educational and philanthropic enterprises, and to investigate and improve the conditions in the industrial districts of Chicago."

== The building and museum ==
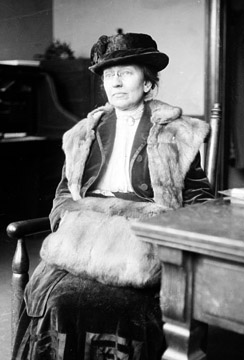
Starr, 1914

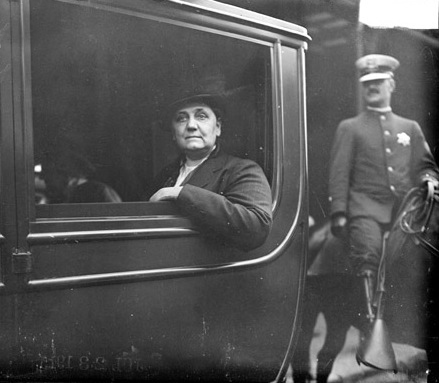
Addams, 1915

Hull House was located in Chicago, Illinois, and took its name from the Italianate mansion built by real estate magnate Charles Jerald Hull (1820–1889) at 800 South Halsted Street in 1856. The building was located in what had once been a fashionable part of town, but by 1889, when Addams was searching for a location for her experiment, it had descended into squalor. This was partly due to the rapid and overwhelming influx of immigrants into the Near West Side neighborhood. Charles Hull granted his former home to his cousin Helen Culver, who in turn granted it to Addams on a 25-year rent-free lease. By 1907, Addams had acquired 13 buildings surrounding Hull's mansion. Between 1889 and 1935, Addams and Ellen Gates Starr continuously redeveloped the building. In 1912, the Bowen Country Club summer camp was added to complete the Hull House complex. The facility remained at the original location until it was purchased in 1963 by what was then called the University of Illinois-Circle Campus. The development of University of Illinois-Circle Campus required the demolition of most of the Hull House buildings and the 1967 restoration to the original building by Frazier, Raftery, Orr and Fairbank removed Addams's third floor addition. In addition to the mansion, of the dozen additional buildings only the craftsman style dining hall (built in 1905 and designed by Pond & Pond) survives and it was moved 200 yards (182.9 m) from its original site to be next to the mansion.

== Theater ==
Addams held the belief that theater benefits the community, and, in 1899, she established an amateur theater group in the Hull House. Hull House Women's Club president, Laura Dainty Pelham, served as the director for the Hull House Players in its early years, producing two plays a year in addition to variety shows. The stage was often used by community members in the neighborhood. Immigrants from Greek and Eastern Europe often performed productions in their own languages. Players also performed contemporary plays by Shaw, Ibsen, and Galsworthy often for the first time in Chicago.

The Hull House Players has been credited as the first theater in the American Little Theater Movement. America's improvisational theatre scene also has its roots in Hull House, as Viola Spolin, noted improvisational techniques instructor, taught classes and developed her techniques at Hull House. The original Hull House Theater was damaged in 1957 in a fire. However, in 1963, director, Robert Sickinger, continued the work of Jane Addams, directing shows at "the Hull-House Association’s four theaters at the Jane Addams Center and Uptown Center on the North Side and Parkway Community House and Henry Booth House on the South Side.

== Since the 1930s ==
Addams was head resident until her death in 1935. Hull House continued to serve the community surrounding the Halsted location until it was displaced by the urban branch campus of the University of Illinois in the 1960s. Until 2012, the social service center role was performed throughout the city at various locations under an umbrella organization, the Jane Addams Hull House Association. The original Hull House building itself is a museum, part of the College of Architecture and the Arts at the University of Illinois Chicago, and is open to the public.

The Jane Addams Hull House Association was one of Chicago's largest nonprofit social welfare organizations. Its mission was to improve social conditions for underserved people and communities by providing creative, innovative programs and by advocating for related public policy reforms. The Association had more than 50 programs at over 40 sites throughout Chicago and served approximately 60,000 individuals, families, and community members every year.

The Jane Addams Hull-House Museum is part of the College of Architecture and the Arts at the University of Illinois Chicago and serves as a memorial to Addams and other resident social reformers, whose work influenced the lives of their immigrant neighbors, as well as national and international public policy. The museum and its programs connect the work of Hull House residents to important contemporary social issues. The Museum's collection includes over 1,100 artifacts related to Hull House history and over 100 oral interviews conducted with people who have shared their stories about Hull House and the surrounding neighborhood.

=== Hull House Association closure ===
Because of its heavy reliance on public support—as much as 85 percent of its revenue came from such sources—Hull House Association had essentially become an arm of government, unlike anything Ms. Addams might recognize today. When Clarence Wood, then the head of Chicago's Human Relations Commission, took over in 2000, he promised to move toward more private fundraising. But that effort appears to have failed to bring in more than a few million dollars in any given year, accounting for less than 10 percent of the agency's funding in most of the last decade, according to financial statements filed with the IRS and the Illinois attorney general's office.

On January 19, 2012, it was announced that Jane Addams Hull House Association would close in the spring of 2012 and file for bankruptcy due to financial difficulties, after almost 122 years. On Friday, January 27, 2012, Hull House closed unexpectedly and all employees received their final paychecks. Employees learned at time of closing that they would not receive severance pay or earned vacation pay or healthcare coverage. Union officials said that the agency closed while owing employees more than $27,000 in unpaid expense reimbursement claims. The University of Illinois Chicago's Jane Addams Hull-House Museum (unaffiliated with the agency), however, remains open.

== Workers and residents ==
Founders and workers, sorted by surname

- Edith Abbott, resident social worker
- Grace Abbott, resident social worker
- Jane Addams, cofounder with Ellen Gates Starr
- Ethel Percy Andrus, volunteer
- Enella Benedict, founder and director for the Art School
- Neva Boyd, founded the Recreational Training School
- Sophonisba Breckinridge, social scientist
- Charlotte E. Carr, head resident 1937-1942
- Cornelia De Bey, worker
- Dorothy Detzer, social, peace, relief and juvenille activist
- Emily Edwards (de Cantabrana), art teacher
- Julia I. Felsenthal, social worker
- Myrtle Merritt French, art teacher
- Alice Hamilton, artist, worker, and resident
- Florence Kelley, established a Bureau of Women's Labor there
- Julia Lathrop, children's rights activist and civil service reformer
- Dorothy Loeb, artist, teacher, and resident
- Mary McDowell, teacher and social reformer
- Ernest Carroll Moore, teacher, late founder and first provost of University of California, Los Angeles (UCLA)
- Willard Motley, a founder of Hull House Magazine
- Mary Kenney O'Sullivan, trade union activist, resident
- Frances Perkins, labor rights advocate, later Secretary of Labor
- Adena Miller Rich, head resident 1935 to 1937
- Pauline Gibling Schindler, taught piano
- Charles Phineas Schwartz, legal counsel, trustee, and vice president
- Eleanor Clarke Slagle, established a workroom for handicapped people, later founder of occupational therapy
- Ida Mott Smith, aide to Jane Addams, and her husband Robert Morss Lovett were residents from 1921 to 1937
- Viola Spolin, teacher, Recreational Training School
- Ellen Gates Starr, cofounder with Jane Addams
- Alzina Stevens, labor leader and social reformer
- Anne Swainson, taught textiles from 1915 to 1919
- Rachelle Yarros, opened the country's second birth control clinic, married Victor Yarros, both of whom were residents

Residents or non-resident clients

- Henry Standing Bear, resident
- Benny Goodman, joined the boys club band
- Gerard Swope, resident who married resident Mary Hill, later worked for General Electric Company (1922–1939)

== See also ==
- Jane Addams Burial Site
- John H. Addams
- John H. Addams Homestead
- History of social work
- Hull House Music School
- Settlement and community houses in the United States
- List of settlement houses in Chicago
