= 1872 Nebraska gubernatorial election =

- October 8, 1872
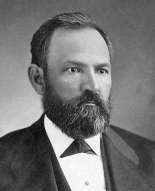

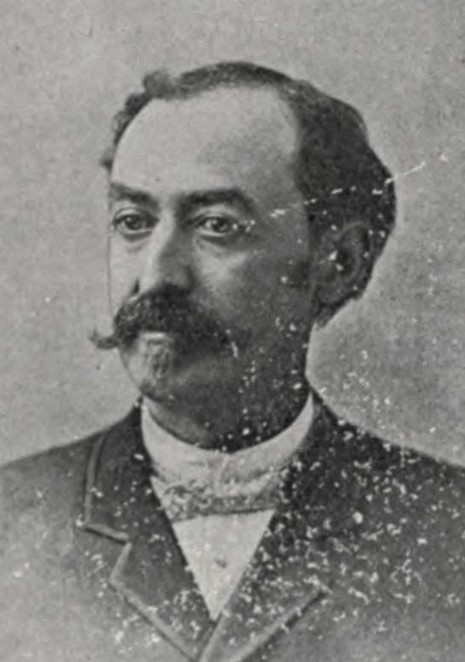
Nominee	Robert W. Furnas	Henry C. Lett
Party	Republican	Democratic
Popular vote	16,543	11,227
Percentage	59.57%	40.43%
- County results Furnas: 50–60% 60–70% 70–80% 80–90% >90% Lett: 50–60% 60–70% 80–90% >90%
Governor before election
William H. James (Acting)
Republican
Elected Governor
Robert Wilkinson Furnas
Republican

The 1872 Nebraska gubernatorial election was held on October 8, 1872. (Note: The Nebraska Constitution of 1866 specified in Article III, Section 1, that the governor and all executive officers were to be elected on the second Tuesday in October.) Three-term incumbent Governor of Nebraska, David Butler was impeached and removed from office on June 2, 1871. Because Nebraska's Constitution at the time did not include the office of lieutenant governor, Butler was replaced by Nebraska Secretary of State William H. James as acting governor, filling out the remainder of Butler's term. In 1872, James decided not to seek election to the governorship. The election of 1872 thus featured Republican nominee Robert Wilkinson Furnas, a member of the University of Nebraska Board of regents since 1869, defeating Democratic nominee Henry C. Lett, a lawyer from Brownville, Nebraska.

== General election ==
=== Candidates ===
- Colonel Robert W. Furnas, Republican candidate, former member of the Nebraska Territorial Council from 1857 to 1859 from Nemaha County, Nebraska, and member of the University of Nebraska board of regents from 1869 to 1875
- Henry C. Lett, Democratic candidate, lawyer from Brownville, Nebraska, and president of the Brownville office of the Fort Kearney and Pacific Railroad, Democratic nominee for Nebraska State Auditor in 1868

=== Results ===
Nebraska gubernatorial election, 1872
Party	Candidate	Votes	%
Republican	Robert W. Furnas	16,543	59.57%
Democratic	Henry C. Lett	11,227	40.43%
Total votes		27,770	100.0%
Republican hold			
