= 1876 Nebraska lieutenant gubernatorial election =

- November 7, 1876
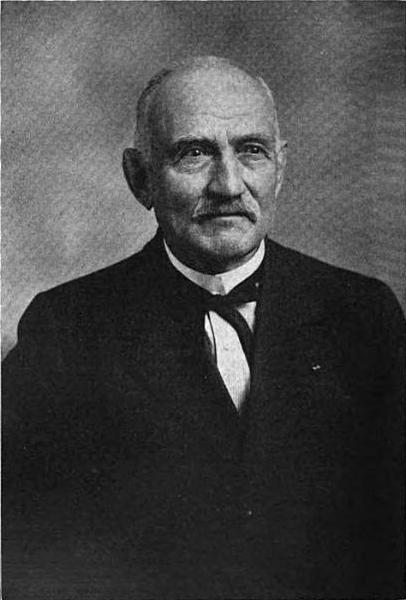

Nominee	Othman A. Abbott	Miles Zentmeyer	Allen Root
Party	Republican	Democratic	Greenback
Popular vote	31,088	17,558	2,777
Percentage	60.4%	34.1%	5.4%
Lieutenant Governor before election
Position created
Elected Lieutenant Governor
Othman A. Abbott
Republican

The 1876 Nebraska lieutenant gubernatorial election was held on November 7, 1876, and featured Republican nominee Othman A. Abbott defeating Democratic nominee Miles Zentmeyer and Greenback Party nominee Allen Root.

It was the first election held under the newly adopted Nebraska Constitution of 1875. Prior to this election, the State of Nebraska did not have an office of lieutenant governor. Under the Nebraska Constitution of 1866, if the governor died, resigned, or was removed from office (as happened to Governor David Butler in 1871), then the Nebraska Secretary of State was appointed as Acting Governor until the vacancy would be filled by the next election. The Constitution of 1875 created the office of Lieutenant Governor of Nebraska, leading to the first election of a lieutenant governor for Nebraska in this election.

== General election ==
=== Candidates ===
- Othman A. Abbott, Republican candidate, lawyer and former member of the Nebraska Senate from 1872 to 1873 from Grand Island, Nebraska
- Allen Root, Greenback candidate from Douglas County, Nebraska, allied with J. F. Gardner who was a candidate for governor
- Miles Zentmeyer, Democratic candidate from Schuyler, Nebraska, lawyer, chair of the Nebraska Democratic Convention, and former editor of the Schuyler Sun newspaper

=== Results ===
Nebraska lieutenant gubernatorial election, 1876
Party	Candidate	Votes	%
Republican	Othman A. Abbott	31,088 (Note: This is the official total given for Abbott in the official Nebraska Senate Journal of 1877. However, some newspaper accounts give Abbott's total as 30,088.)	60.44
Democratic	Miles Zentmeyer	17,558 (Note: This is the official total given for Zentmeyer in the official Nebraska Senate Journal of 1877. However, some newspaper accounts give Zentmeyer's total as 17,458.)	34.14
Greenback	Allen Root	2,777	5.40
Scattering (Note: According to the Nebraska Senate Journal of 1877, this scattering total included votes for Paren England (5), Silas Garber (3), "Miles Zentman" (3), a misspelling of "Miles Zentmeyer," S. P. Mobley (1), and A. B. Young (1).)		13 (Note: This is the official total given for the scattering of additional votes in the official Nebraska Senate Journal of 1877. However, some newspaper accounts listed this total as 12.)	
Total votes		51,436	100.00

== See also ==
- 1876 Nebraska gubernatorial election
