= Thomas P. Kennard =

Nebraskan politician

1st Secretary of State of Nebraska
- In office March 27, 1867 – January 10, 1871
- Governor: David Butler
- Preceded by: Algernon S. Paddock (territorial)
- Succeeded by: William H. James

Member of the Nebraska Senate
- In office January 2, 1877 – January 7, 1879

Personal details
- Born: December 13, 1828 Belmont County, Ohio, U.S.
- Died: June 24, 1920 (aged 91) Lincoln, Nebraska, U.S.
- Party: Republican
- Spouse: Livia E. Kennard (née Templeton)
- Children: 4

Thomas Perkins Kennard (December 13, 1828 – June 24, 1920) was a lawyer who served as Nebraska's first Secretary of State from 1867 to 1871. He was a member of the commission that chose Lincoln, Nebraska, as the site for the state capital.

== Early life ==
Kennard was born on December 13, 1828, to Thomas and Elizabeth (née Jenkins) Kennard as their seventh son. He grew up in a Quaker family near St. Clairsville in Belmont County, Ohio, before moving with his family to near Greensboro, Indiana. Kennard's great-great-grandfather John Kennard may have come over from England on the same ship as William Penn.

Kennard spent his early years traveling and working in wool mills until 1850, when he purchased the Springdale Mill with his brother Jenkins Kennard, which they operated for several years.

== Career ==
Kennard decided to become a lawyer in the early 1850s, borrowing law books to read in the evenings from a local law firm in New Castle, Indiana. He later sat for examination before a judge and was granted license to practice law in the state of Indiana. After moving to Anderson in Madison County, Indiana, he attended an 1854 meeting in Indianapolis of "Fusionists," an abolitionist movement, and two years later, in 1856, he attended a meeting for the formation of the Republican Party.

On April 24, 1857, Kennard arrived in Omaha, Nebraska, after deciding to join two of his brothers, Levi and Marshall Kennard, with their mercantile business in De Soto, Nebraska. With his brother Levi, he started a land agent business. Kennard soon become involved in local Republican Party politics, and in March of 1860, he was selected as a delegate to attend the first Nebraska constitutional convention, where he planned to submit two proposals to establish women's suffrage and prohibit capital punishment. However, the convention never occurred. In 1863, Kennard was elected mayor of De Soto, Nebraska.

On April 12, 1866, the Nebraska Republicans met in convention at Plattsmouth, Nebraska, and nominated a state ticket in favor of the organization of the state. Kennard was nominated as that ticket's candidate for Nebraska Secretary of State. After this convention, John Milton Thayer, a Republican nominee for United States Senator, and Kennard toured the state to raise support for statehood. Kennard later won the 1866 election to become Nebraska's first secretary of state. He was in charge of all official documents of Nebraska, including the state seal.

Newspaper editor J. Sterling Morton particularly disliked Kennard as evidenced by several nicknames he created to describe him, such as "Cannard" (a play on Kennard's last name and a slang term for being dishonest) and "Old Tom."

On June 14, 1867, the Nebraska Legislature created a capital commission, which was responsible for finding a new site for the state capital which was south of the Platte River. Governor David Butler chose himself as well as Kennard and Nebraska State Auditor John Gillespie as members of that commission. After Lancaster, Nebraska (later named Lincoln) was selected, Kennard stayed behind to help survey the land and lay out plots for the capitol, other public buildings, and parks.

Kennard was reelected as Nebraska secretary of state in 1868, but in 1870, he chose not to run for a third term. Even though he was no longer in office in 1871, Kennard was called upon several times to testify in the impeachment trials of Governor David Butler and Auditor John Gillespie. In May 1871, Nebraska Senator Phineas Hitchcock wrote to US President Ulysses S. Grant recommending Kennard for the position of United States consul to Singapore, but Kennard was ultimately not chosen for the position. In January 1873, in celebration of the inauguration of Robert Wilkinson Furnas as governor of Nebraska, Kennard hosted a party at his house which attracted an estimated 600 to 800 people.

After leaving politics, Kennard worked in various business endeavors such as being a land agent for Midland Pacific Railroad, investing in construction, opening a bank, and running a dry goods store. By 1875, in the midst of hard economic times, many of these endeavors had ceased, which led Kennard to focus most of his time on his railroad activities.

In 1876, Kennard reentered politics, being elected to the Nebraska Senate representing Lancaster County, Nebraska. He served for two years, during which he became a founding member of the Nebraska State Historical Society, and then he left the legislature to join a commission sent to Indian Territory to appraise Cherokee lands ceded to other tribes; he was elected president of this commission. After returning to Lincoln, Kennard founded Kennard & Son, with his son Alva, as a brokerage, loan, and insurance firm. He also was involved in other business affairs such as organizing Western Glass & Paint Company in 1890, reportedly one of his most successful business ventures. He served as president and general manager of Western Glass until his retirement in 1910.

In 1896, Kennard traveled to the Republican National Convention in St. Louis, Missouri, supporting William McKinley for president. As a reward for his support, he was appointed receiver of public moneys for the U.S. Land Office in 1898, a position he held until 1902.

== Legacy ==
In his later years, Kennard became informally known as "the Father of Lincoln" for his role in selecting its site as the state capital of Nebraska.

The Thomas P. Kennard House, Kennard's residence when he first lived in Lincoln, located less than a block from the Nebraska State Capitol, still stands today as a museum owned by the State of Nebraska.

The town of Kennard, Nebraska, is named for him.

== Personal life ==
In January 1852, Kennard married Livia E. Templeton, a Baptist, and was thus subsequently dismissed from the local Quaker meetinghouse for "marriage contrary to discipline" since he had married a non-Quaker. Kennard's first son, Alva, was born a year later in January 1853. A daughter, named India and born in 1854, died in childhood after the family moved to Nebraska. Two more daughters were born to Kennard and his wife while in Nebraska: Ida Lulu in 1862 and Cora in 1864.

Kennard's wife Livia died of a stroke on January 5, 1887. Kennard never remarried, and over thirty years later, on June 24, 1920, Kennard died just two days after his Western Glass & Paint business was destroyed by fire. Nebraska Governor Samuel R. McKelvie and University of Nebraska Chancellor Samuel Avery served as pallbearers at his funeral. He was buried next to his wife in Wyuka Cemetery.
