= 1876 Nebraska gubernatorial election =

- November 7, 1876
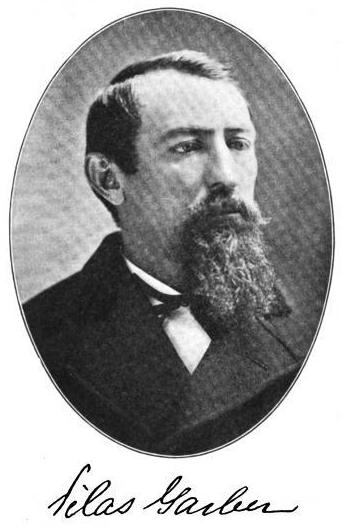

Nominee	Silas Garber	Paren England	Jonathan F. Gardner
Party	Republican	Democratic	Greenback
Popular vote	31,947	17,219	3,022
Percentage	61.17%	32.97%	5.79%
- County results Garber: 40–50% 50–60% 60–70% 70–80% 80–90% 90–100% England: 40–50% 50–60% 60–70% 70–80% 80–90% Gardner: 50–60% No Data/Votes
Governor before election
Silas Garber
Republican
Elected Governor
Silas Garber
Republican

The 1876 Nebraska gubernatorial election was held on November 7, 1876. It was the first election held under the newly adopted Nebraska Constitution of 1875. The election featured incumbent Governor Silas Garber, a Republican, defeating Democratic nominee Paren England, a lawyer from Lancaster County, Nebraska, and Greenback Party nominee Jonathan F. Gardner, former independent candidate for Governor of Nebraska in 1874.

== General election ==
=== Candidates ===
- Silas Garber, Republican candidate, incumbent Governor of Nebraska
- Paren England, Democratic candidate, a lawyer from Lancaster County, Nebraska, chairman of the Nebraska Democratic Central Committee, and Democratic nominee for Nebraska Secretary of State in 1870
- Jonathan F. Gardner, Greenback candidate, former independent candidate for Governor of Nebraska in 1874 from Richardson County, Nebraska

=== Results ===
Nebraska gubernatorial election, 1876
Party	Candidate	Votes	%
Republican	Silas Garber (incumbent)	31,947	61.17%
Democratic	Paren England	17,219	32.97%
Greenback	Jonathan F. Gardner	3,022	5.79%
Scattering		36	
Total votes		52,224	100.0%
Republican hold			

== See also ==
- 1876 Nebraska lieutenant gubernatorial election
