= Garbers =

Garbers is a surname. Notable people with the surname include:

- Chase Garbers (born 1999), American football player
- Chris Garbers (born 1929), South African scientist
- David Garbers (1944–2006), American biologist
- Emelie Garbers (born 1982), Swedish actress
- Ethan Garbers (born 2002), American football player
- Kate Garbers (born 1981), British activist

== See also ==
- Garber (surname)
