= Daniel Garber (disambiguation) =

Daniel Garber (1880–1958), was an American impressionalist landscape painter. Daniel Garber may also refer to:

- Daniel Garber (philosopher) (born 1949), American philosopher and philosophy professor
- Daniel Garber (politician) (1875–1959), American politician from Nebraska
