= Garbey =

Garbey is a surname. Notable people with the surname include:

- Bárbaro Garbey (born 1956), American baseball player
- Marcia Garbey (born 1949), Cuban athlete
- Ramón Garbey (born 1971), Cuban boxer
- Rolando Garbey (born 1947), Cuban boxer

== See also ==
- Garber (surname)
