= John Keys Winchell =

American architect & designer of Chicago's first insane asylum

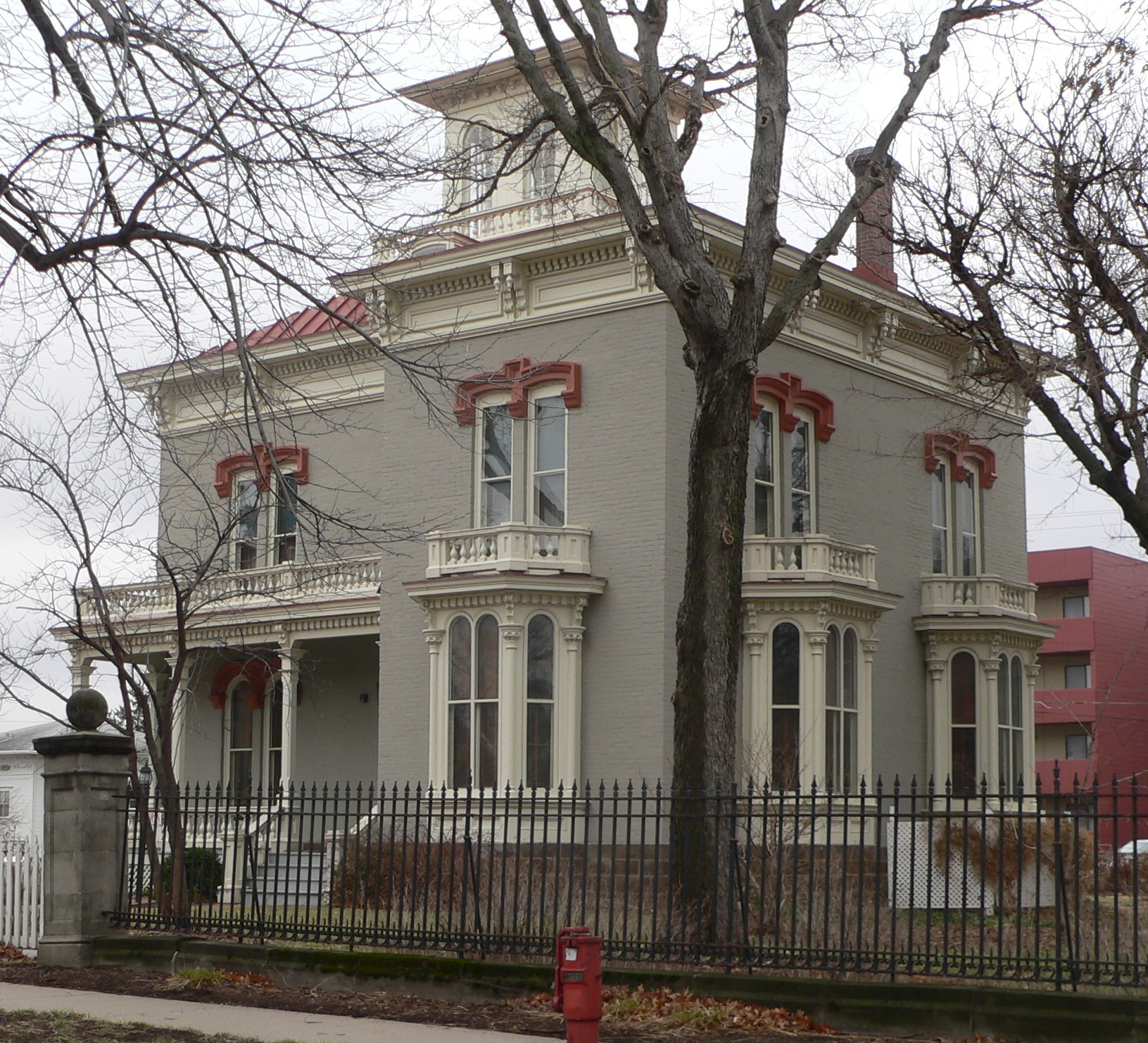
Thomas P. Kennard House

John Keys Winchell (1841 - 1877) was an architect in Chicago who worked on buildings in Nebraska's then newly designated capitol of Lincoln. He designed the state's first insane asylum. He also designed the Thomas P. Kennard House for the state's first secretary of state and Butler Mansion for Nebraska Governor David Butler in Lincoln, Nebraska.

The Butler House was used by a Klavern of the KKK before the great depression, was then a clubhouse for a golf course, and was also a radio station and Ideal Grocery before being razed by 1960. Winchell designed houses for all three commissioners who oversaw the relocation of Nebraska's Capitol from Omaha to Lincoln, including the Thomas Kennard house. It is the oldest extant building in the original plat of Lincoln, Nebraska. It was designated the Nebraska Statehood Memorial in 1965.

A May 27, 1875 news brief in the Sacramento Daily Union described Winchell as the architect of Nevada's state capitol grounds and building. Other sources credit the Nevada State Capitol to Joseph Gosling, a San Francisco architect.

== Work ==
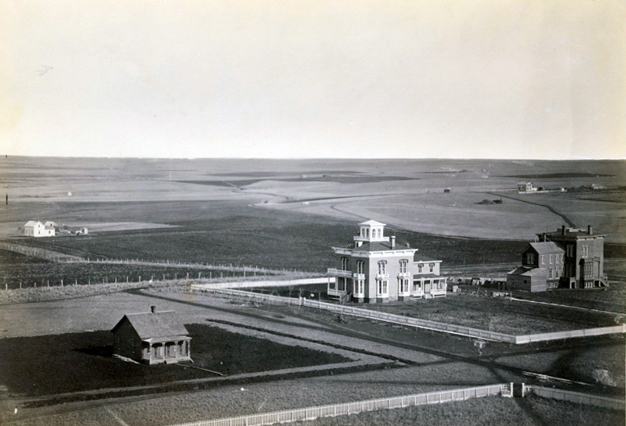
Kennard and Gillespie houses in 1872

- Thomas P. Kennard House (1869) at 1627 H. Street

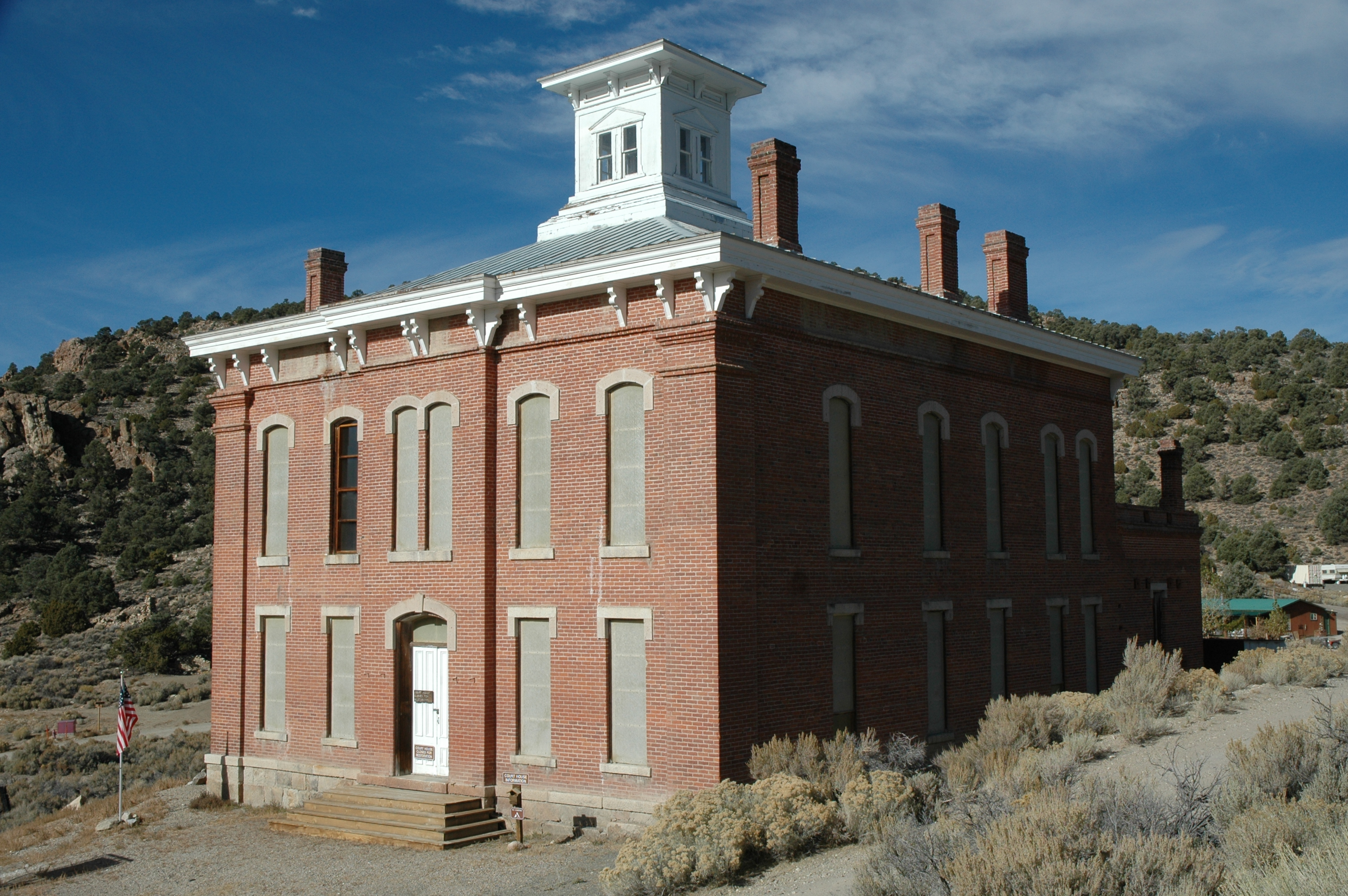
Original Nye County Courthouse in Belmont, Nevada, closed for renovation, October 2009

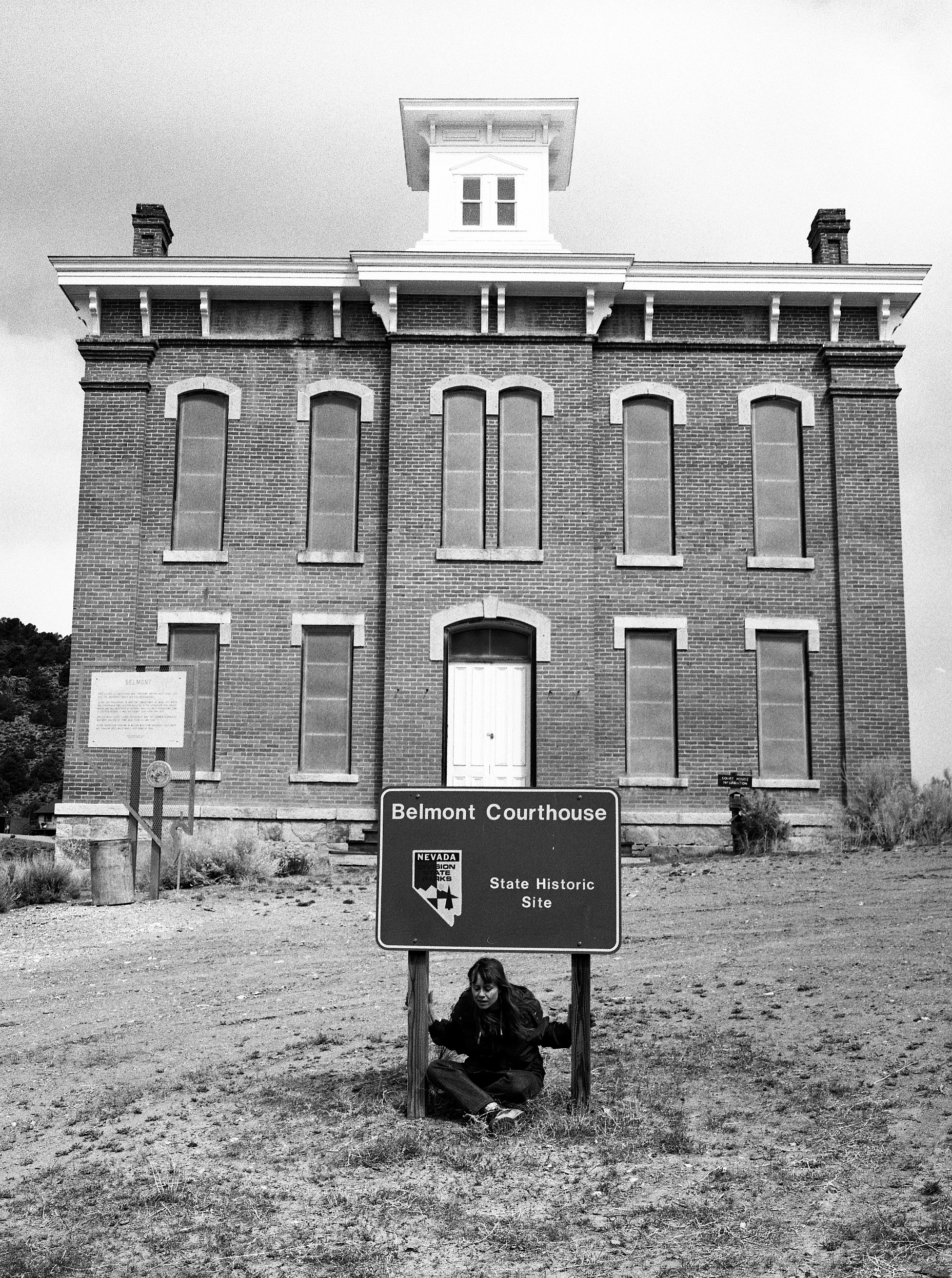
Original courthouse in Belmont

- John Gillespie (auditor) House (1869)
- David Butler House (1869) for Nebraska Governor David Butler
- Nebraska Asylum for the Insane (1870), burned down in 1871
- State Prison in Reno, Nevada
- Bigelow House Hotel (1871), destroyed by the Great Chicago Fire in 1871
- Nye County Courthouse (1875)
