= Michàlle Mor Barak =

American social scientist

- Occupations: Social work and business management researcher, academic and author
- Title: Dean's Professor of Social Work and Business

Academic background
- Education: University of Haifa; University of California, Berkeley

Academic work
- Institutions: University of Southern California, Technion; Israel Institute of Technology

Michàlle E. Mor Barak is an American social scientist in the areas of social work and business management, a researcher, academic and author. She is Dean's Endowed Professor of Social Work and Business at the University of Southern California. She is known for being the first to offer a theory-based measure for the construct of inclusion. She was among the first to identify and offer differential definitions for diversity and for inclusion. She coined the term Globally Inclusive Workplace, which she developed into a theory-based model with practical applications.

Mor Barak's research has focused on diversity and inclusion in the workplace and the development of intervention practices that corporations, governmental and non-profit organizations can adopt to foster an inclusive workplace. Some of her research has dealt with corporate social responsibility, work-life balance and the science of social good. Her research yielded two measures for diversity climate and inclusion within organizations that have been used in research and practice and translated to several languages: The MBIE Inclusion-Exclusion Scale and the Diversity Climate Scale.

In 2007, her book, Managing Diversity: Toward a Globally Inclusive Workplace, received the Terry Best Book award from the Academy of Management. In 2017 she was inducted as a fellow into the American Academy of Social Work and Social Welfare.

== Education ==
Mor Barak received a BA and an MSW from the University of Haifa in Israel. She received a Fulbright Scholarship and moved to the United States, where she joined the University of California, Berkeley for her Ph.D., and continued to do her post-doc there.

== Career ==
Mor Barak joined University of Southern California (USC) as an assistant professor in 1988, becoming associate professor in 1994. At the same time, she had a joint appointment at the USC Andrus Gerontology Center. She became Full Professor in 2003 with a joint appointment at the USC Marshall School of Business. In 2004, she was endowed as the first Lenore Stein-Wood and William S. Wood Professor of Social Work and Business, and in 2014, she became the Dean's Endowed Professor of Social Work and Business.

From 2009 to 2016, Mor Barak was the Director of the Ph.D. Program at School of Social Work at USC. In 2013, she co-founded the Research Cluster on Management, Organizations and Policy Transformation (MOPT), and served as its co-chair until 2016. In 2014, she was appointed as the inaugural department chair of Social Change and Innovation (SCI) in the USC School of Social Work.

In 2001, Mor Barak was awarded a Rockefeller Foundation grant to lead the first international interdisciplinary conference on diversity and inclusion in the Foundation's Bellagio Conference and Study Center in Italy. Two years later, she received a grant from the Borchard foundation to lead a second international conference with a focus on global inclusion in the Foundation's Chateau de la Bretesche in France (2003).

Mor Barak has been the Associate Editor of Human Service Organization: Management, Leadership & Governance since 2013.

== Research and work ==
=== Diversity and inclusion in workplace ===
Mor Barak's research on climate for diversity in the 1990s, was among the first to introduce the construct of inclusion based on scientific findings. Her 1998 article "Organizational and personal dimensions in diversity climate: ethnic and gender differences in employee diversity perceptions" examined the differences between the perceptions of women and racial/ethnic minority groups from the mainstream corporate culture with respect to diversity climate. Conducted by measuring employees’ perceptions of issues and practices that are important to understanding and managing diversity, the results of the study suggested four dimensions of diversity climate—personal value for diversity, personal comfort with diversity, organizational fairness, and organizational inclusion. In their review of the diversity and inclusion research, Shore et al. noted that Mor Barak was a leader in the field because she was the first to provide a theoretical framework for inclusion as well as empirical testing of that framework. The authors note that "most of the research has lacked theoretical grounding … and empirical testing…", and credit Mor Barak's research as being a "notable exception" in that she has developed a theoretical model of inclusion for women and members of minority groups. She posits that diversity and organizational climate contribute to perceptions of inclusion-exclusion, and mediate job satisfaction, organizational commitment, individual wellbeing, and task effectiveness. Furthermore, they note that "Following Mor Barak’s lead, other empirical studies have been conducted on inclusion practices."

Mor Barak's research was among the first to make the distinction between diversity and inclusion and yielded two separate measures—one for diversity climate and one for climate for inclusion that have been used in research and practice: The Inclusion-Exclusion Scale (MBIE) developed in 1998 and revised in 2005 into the MBIE Scale, and the Diversity Climate Scale developed in 2006. They were translated to several languages. Mor Barak wrote the book Managing Diversity: Toward a Globally Inclusive Workplace in 2005 (4th edition, 2017). In the first part of the book, global diversity trends, legislation, and public policies in different countries are analyzed. These analyses provide the foundation for the second part of the book which offers inclusive management practices in business, government, and human service organizations. The book won the Academy of Management's George R. Terry Book Award for the most "outstanding contribution to management knowledge". It also won the Association of college and Research Libraries Choice Award and received positive reviews in academic journals, including a review in the Academy of Management Learning and Education Journal, noting that the book is "an excellent resource to develop, theorize, and work out the inclusive workplace in a very comprehensive, encompassing, and multidisciplinary way".

In 2016, Mor Barak completed a meta-analysis study reviewing 20 years of research on diversity and inclusion in human service organizations.

=== Social work in workplace ===
A significant part of Mor Barak's research has focused on social work in the workplace. She wrote articles redefining social work in the workplace for the 21st century. She also co-edited, with David Bargal, a book titled Social Services in the Workplace: Repositioning Occupational Social Work in The New Millennium. Mor Barak's research has focused on social workers as workers with several longitudinal research studies in collaboration with a large public department of children and family services, focusing on retention, burnout, work-life balance and supervision for social workers. Her theory-based meta-analysis exploring the reasons for turnover among social workers published in 2001 in the journal Social Service Review was ranked #4 most cited article in social work in the first decade of the 21st century.

Mor Barak was one of the original co-creators of the first Islandwood meetings on Science of Social Work in Doctoral Education in 2013, and of the second Islandwood roundtable in 2014.

=== The Science and Practice of Social Good ===
Mor Barak created an original model for social good. Her model, based on interviews with public leaders, business innovators and researchers, is based on three anchor themes: Environmental justice and sustainability; social inclusion; and peace, harmony and collaboration. The model proposes that social good requires global, multilevel thinking and a variety of perspectives, values, and disciplines. Promoting social good requires the engagement of collaborative and nontraditional systems of change. It also requires levering innovative technologies to enable the use of novel and unconventional approaches to designing and executing solutions for achieving social good. Her 2020 volume The Science and Practice of Social Good brings together scholars and practitioners from different disciplines who share their perspectives on social good and provide examples of innovative initiatives.

== Awards and honors ==
- 2001 - Best Paper Award, Institute of Behavioral and Applied Management
- 2003 - Sterling C. Franklin Distinguished Faculty Award for Research and Scholarship
- 2005 - The Mellon Award for Excellence in Mentorship
- 2006 - Choice Award for Outstanding Titles from the Association of college and Research Libraries
- 2007 - Fellow, Global Business Round Table, Center for Work and Family, Boston College
- 2007 - Academy of Management George R. Terry Best Book Award for “the Most Outstanding Contribution to the Advancement of Management Knowledge”- Managing Diversity: Toward a Globally Inclusive Workplace
- 2014 - Sterling C. Franklin Distinguished Faculty Award for Research and Scholarship.
- 2016 - Academy of Management, Division of Gender and Diversity in Organizations Award for Scholarly Contributions to Educational Practice Advancing Women in Leadership.
- 2017 - Mary Parker Follette Award for Best Paper, Journal of Human Service Organizations: Management, Leadership and Governance
- 2018 - Elected and Inducted as a Fellow of the American Academy of Social Work and Social Welfare (AASWSW)
- 2018 - Award for Leadership in Doctoral Education, Group for Advancement of Doctoral Education (GADE)

== Publications ==
=== Books ===
- Social Networks and Health of the Frail Elderly (1991)
- Social Services in the Workplace (2000)
- Instructor’s Manual for Managing Diversity (2006)
- Managing Diversity: Toward a Globally Inclusive Workplace (2005, 1st edition) (2017, 4th edition)
- The Science and Practice of Social Good (2020)

=== Selected papers ===
- Mor Barak, M.E., Cherin, D.A., and Berkman, S. 1998. Organizational and personal dimensions in Diversity Climate: Ethnic and gender differences in employee diversity perceptions. Journal of Applied Behavioral Science, 34(1), 82–104.
- Mor Barak, M.E., Nissly, J., and Levin, A. 2001. Antecedents to Retention and Turnover among Child Welfare, Social Work, and other Human Services Employees: What can we learn from past research? A review and Meta-analysis. Social Service Review (December), 625–661.
- Mor Barak, M.E., Lizano, E. L., Kim, A., Duan, L., Hsiao, H. Y., & Rhee, M. K. Brimhall, K. A. 2016. The Promise of Diversity Management for Climate of Inclusion: A State-of-the-Art Review and Meta-Analysis, Human Service Organizations: Management, Leadership and Governance 4(40), 305–333. DOI: 10.1080/23303131.2016.1138915
- Mor Barak, M.E., Findler, L. and Wind, L.H. 2001. Diversity, inclusion, and commitment in organizations: International explorations. Journal of Behavioral and Applied Management, 2(2), 72–91.
- Mor Barak, M.E. and Brekke, J.S. 2014. Social Work Science and Identity Formation for Doctoral Scholars within Intellectual Communities, Research on Social Work Practice, 25(5), 616–624. Doi: 10.1177/1049731514528047
- Mor Barak, M.E., Travis, D.J., Pyun, H. and Xie, B. 2009. "A Meta-analysis of the Role of Supervision in Child Welfare Service Provision" Social Service Review, 83(1):3-32 (Lead Article).
- Mor Barak, M.E., Levin, A., & Nissly, J.A., Lane, C.J. 2006. Why do they leave? Modeling turnover intentions from child welfare workers’ perceptions of their organizational climate, Children and Youth Services Review, 28(5), 548–577.
- Mor Barak, M.E. and Travis, D. 2013. Socioeconomic Trends: Broadening the Diversity Ecosystem. In Q. M. Robertson (Ed.) The Oxford Handbook of Diversity in the Workplace, London, UK: Oxford, pp. 393–418.
