= Garber (surname) =

Garber as a surname may refer to:

- Alan Garber (born 1955), president of Harvard University
- Anne Garber (1947–2011), Canadian journalist, restaurant critic, and food and travel writer
- Bette Garber (1942–2008), American photojournalist
- Cassandra Garber, president of the Krio Descendants Union
- Daniel Garber (1880–1958), American Impressionist painter
- Daniel Garber (philosopher) (born 1949), American philosopher and philosophy professor
- Daniel Garber (politician) (1875–1959), American politician from Nebraska
- David S. Garber (1898–1984), professional television writer
- Don Garber (born 1957), American sports executive and commissioner of Major League Soccer
- Eileen Garber (born 1949), American novelist now known as Eileen Buckholtz
- Frederick W. Garber (1877–1950), American architect
- Gene Garber (born 1947), American baseball pitcher
- Gottlieb Garber (1859–1932), American politician from Washington
- Harvey C. Garber (1866–1938), American politician from Ohio
- Helen K. Garber (born 1954), American photographer
- Hope Garber (1924–2005), Canadian actress and singer
- J. Ryan Garber (born 1973), American composer
- Jacob A. Garber (1879–1953), American politician from Virginia
- Jake Garber (born 1965), American make-up artist
- Jan Garber (1894–1977), American jazz bandleader
- John Garber (judge) (1833–1908), American judge from Nevada
- Joseph R. Garber (1943–2005), American author
- Keenan Garber (born 2000), American football player
- Marjorie Garber (born 1944), American literature professor
- Martin Garber (1829–1903), American politician from Iowa
- Mary Garber (1916–2008), American sportswriter
- Matthew Garber (1956–1977), English actor
- Milton C. Garber (1867–1948), American politician and judge from Oklahoma
- Mitch Garber, Canadian international business executive
- Paul Garber, American primatologist
- Paul E. Garber (1899–1992), first head of the National Air Museum of the Smithsonian Institution
- Randy Garber (soccer) (born 1952), American soccer player
- Silas Garber (1883–1905), American politician from Nebraska
- Terri Garber (born 1960), American actress
- Victor Garber (born 1949), Canadian actor and singer

== See also ==
- Garbers, surname
