= 1874 Nebraska gubernatorial election =

- October 13, 1874
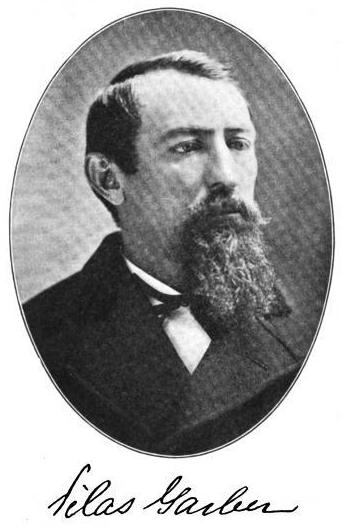

Nominee	Silas Garber	Albert Tuxbury	Jonathan F. Gardner
Party	Republican	Democratic	Independent
Popular vote	21,568	8,946	4,159
Percentage	59.88%	24.84%	11.55%
- County results Garber: 40–50% 50–60% 60–70% 70–80% 80–90% >90% Tuxbury: 40–50% 50–60% 60–70% 80–90% Gardner: 40–50% 50–60% No Votes
Governor before election
Robert Wilkinson Furnas
Republican
Elected Governor
Silas Garber
Republican

The 1874 Nebraska gubernatorial election was held on October 13, 1874. (Note: The Nebraska Constitution of 1866 specified in Article III, Section 1, that the governor and all executive officers were to be elected on the second Tuesday in October.) It was the last gubernatorial election held under the Nebraska Constitution of 1866. Incumbent Governor of Nebraska Robert Wilkinson Furnas did not seek reelection to a second term. The election featured Republican nominee Silas Garber, a member of the Nebraska House of Representatives, defeating Democratic nominee Albert Tuxbury, mayor of Nebraska City, as well as Independent nominee Jonathan F. Gardner and Prohibition Party nominee Jarvis S. Church.

== General election ==
=== Candidates ===
- Silas Garber, Republican candidate, member of the Nebraska House of Representatives from 1873 to 1875 from Red Cloud, Nebraska in Webster County
- Albert Tuxbury, Democratic candidate, mayor of Nebraska City in 1872 from Otoe County
- Jonathan F. Gardner, Independent candidate, from Richardson County, Nebraska
- Jarvis S. Church, Prohibition candidate, from Nemaha County, Nebraska

=== Results ===
Nebraska gubernatorial election, 1874
Party	Candidate	Votes	%
Republican	Silas Garber	21,568	59.88%
Democratic	Albert Tuxbury	8,946	24.84%
Independent	Jonathan F. Gardner	4,159	11.55%
Prohibition	Jarvis S. Church	1,346	3.74%
Total votes		36,019	100.0%
Republican hold			
