= Earl Carpenter =

Earl Carpenter may refer to:

- Earl Carpenter (actor) (born 1970), English musical theatre actor
- Earl Carpenter (politician) (1894–1963), American politician from Nebraska
