= Crown Family School of Social Work, Policy, and Practice =

Constituent college of University of Chicago

Coordinates: 41°47′8.1″N 87°36′6.2″W

University of Chicago Crown Family School of Social Work, Policy, and Practice
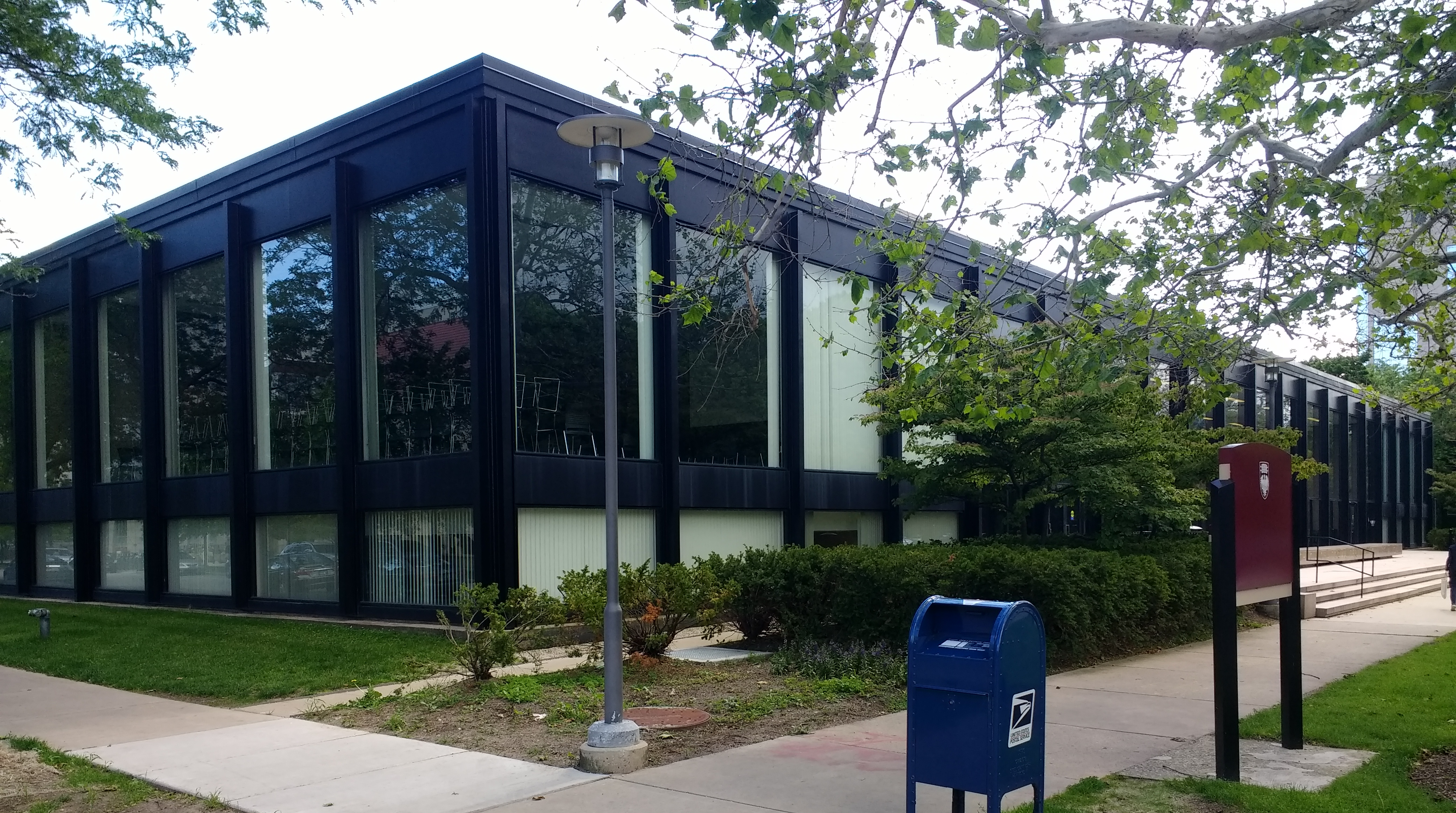
- Former names: Social Science Center for Practical Training (1903–1920); School of Social Service Administration (1920–2021)
- Established: 1920; 106 years ago
- Parent institution: University of Chicago
- Dean: Deborah Gorman-Smith
- Location: Chicago, Illinois, US
- Campus: Urban
- Website: ssa.uchicago.edu

The University of Chicago Crown Family School of Social Work, Policy, and Practice, formerly known as the School of Social Service Administration (SSA) from 1920 to 2021, is the school of social work of the University of Chicago.

== History ==
The school was founded in 1903 by minister and social work educator Graham Taylor as the Social Science Center for Practical Training in Philanthropic and Social Work. By 1920, through the efforts of founding mothers Edith Abbott, Grace Abbott and Sophonisba Breckinridge, along with other notable trustees such as social worker Jane Addams and philanthropist Julius Rosenwald, the school merged with the University of Chicago as one of its graduate schools. It became known from that point forward as the School of Social Service Administration since 1920. The campus building the school occupies was designed by modernist architect Ludwig Mies van der Rohe. In 1924, Helen Rankin Jeter received the first PhD from the merged school, with a dissertation about the Chicago Juvenile Court.

On January 27, 2021, the university announced that the School of Social Service Administration was renamed the Crown Family School of Social Work, Policy, and Practice, following a US$75 million gift from James Crown and Paula Crown.

== Rankings and reputation ==
The SSA is ranked third for Best Schools for Social Work by the U.S. News & World Report as of January 2025.

== See also ==
- Social Service Review
- List of social work schools
