= Helen Rankin Jeter =

American social scientist

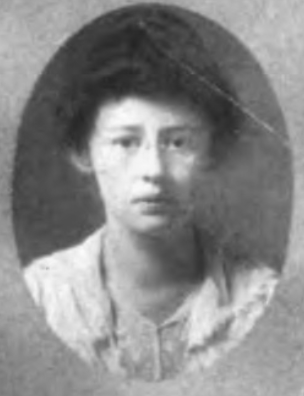
- Jeter, from the 1917 yearbook of the University of California
- Born: Helen Francis Rankin Jeter; November 11, 1895; North Platte, Nebraska, U.S.
- Died: March 6, 1998 (aged 102); Sandy Spring, Maryland, U.S.
- Occupations: College professor, economist, federal official

Helen Francis Rankin Jeter (November 11, 1895 – March 6, 1998) was an American social scientist and college professor. She earned the first Ph.D. from the University of Chicago's School of Social Service Administration, and worked for federal agencies for much of her later career.

== Early life and education ==
Jeter was born in North Platte, Nebraska, the daughter of James Burrell Jeter and Harriet Loretta Rankin Jeter. She graduated from Los Angeles High School in 1913, She earned a bachelor's degree from the University of California in 1917, and pursued further studies at the University of Chicago, where she earned a master's degree in 1920. She earned the first Ph.D. from the University of Chicago's School of Social Service Administration in 1924, with a 1922 dissertation about Chicago's Juvenile Court.

== Career ==
Jeter taught economics classes at Bryn Mawr College from 1922 to 1924, and at the University of California from 1924 to 1925. She was an assistant professor in the School of Social Service Administration at the University of Chicago from 1925 to 1930. In 1933 she led a committee preparing a report for the Los Angeles County Emergency Relief Committee.

Jeter left academia for government work. She was head of public assistance research and statistics at the Social Security Board from 1936 to 1938. She had similar positions at the Department of Agriculture from 1942 to 1944, in the Bureau of the Budget from 1951 to 1953, and with the Children's Bureau from 1956 until she retired in 1962. She was employed in postwar refugee work with the United Nations in London, Vienna, and Geneva, from 1945 to 1951.

== Publications ==
- "A Summary of Juvenile-court Legislation in the United States" (1920, with Sophonisba Breckinridge)
- "Trends of population in the region of Chicago" (1927)
- "Counting the Recipients of Public Assistance and the Dollars They Receive" (1938)
- "Wartime Problems of Family Security" (1942)
- "Farm Family Spending and Saving in Wartime" (1942)
- State agencies and juvenile delinquency (1960)
- Children who receive services from public child welfare agencies (1961)
- Children's Problems and Services in Child Welfare Programs (1962)
- Services in Public and Voluntary Child Welfare Programs (1962)

== Personal life ==
Jeter died in 1998, at the age of 102, in Sandy Spring, Maryland. Her elder sister Beryl Rankin Jeter was a pianist and music teacher who also lived to be 102.
