= Nye County Courthouse =

- U.S. National Register of Historic Places
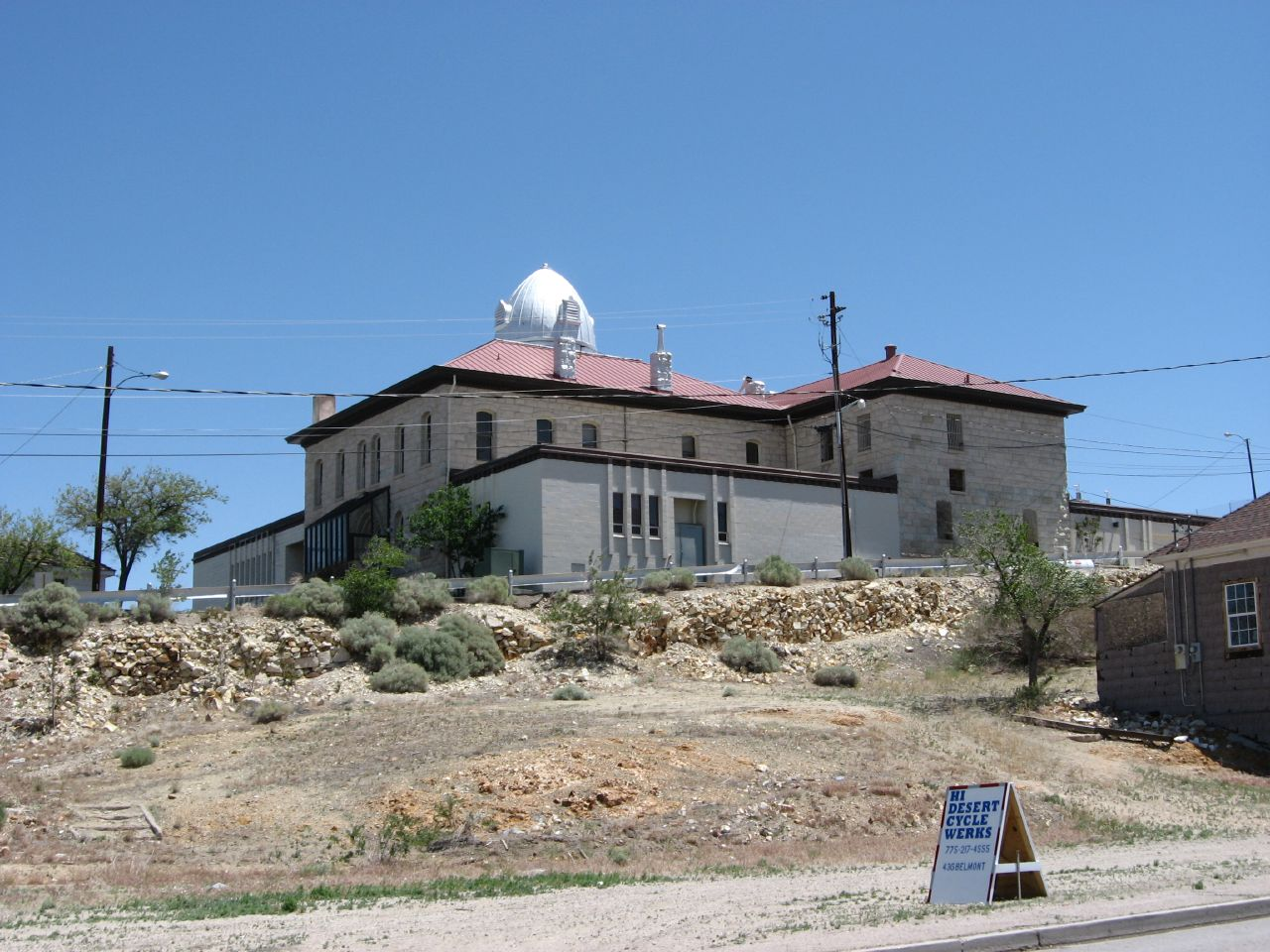
- Old Nye County Courthouse

- Location within Nevada Location within the United States
- Interactive map showing the location of Nye County Courthouse
- Location: McCulloch St., Tonopah, Nevada
- Coordinates: 38.06578°N 117.22676°W
- Built: 1905
- Architect: Robertson, J.C.; Burdick, E.E.
- MPS: Tonopah MRA
- NRHP reference No.: 82003238
- Added to NRHP: May 20, 1982

The Nye County Courthouse in Tonopah, Nevada is a two-story rusticated stone building. Its Romanesque Revival entrance and pointed dome are unique in Nevada. The courthouse was built following the move of the Nye County seat from Belmont to Tonopah in 1905.

== History ==
The Nye County Courthouse in Belmont designed by John Keys Winchell was authorized in 1875.

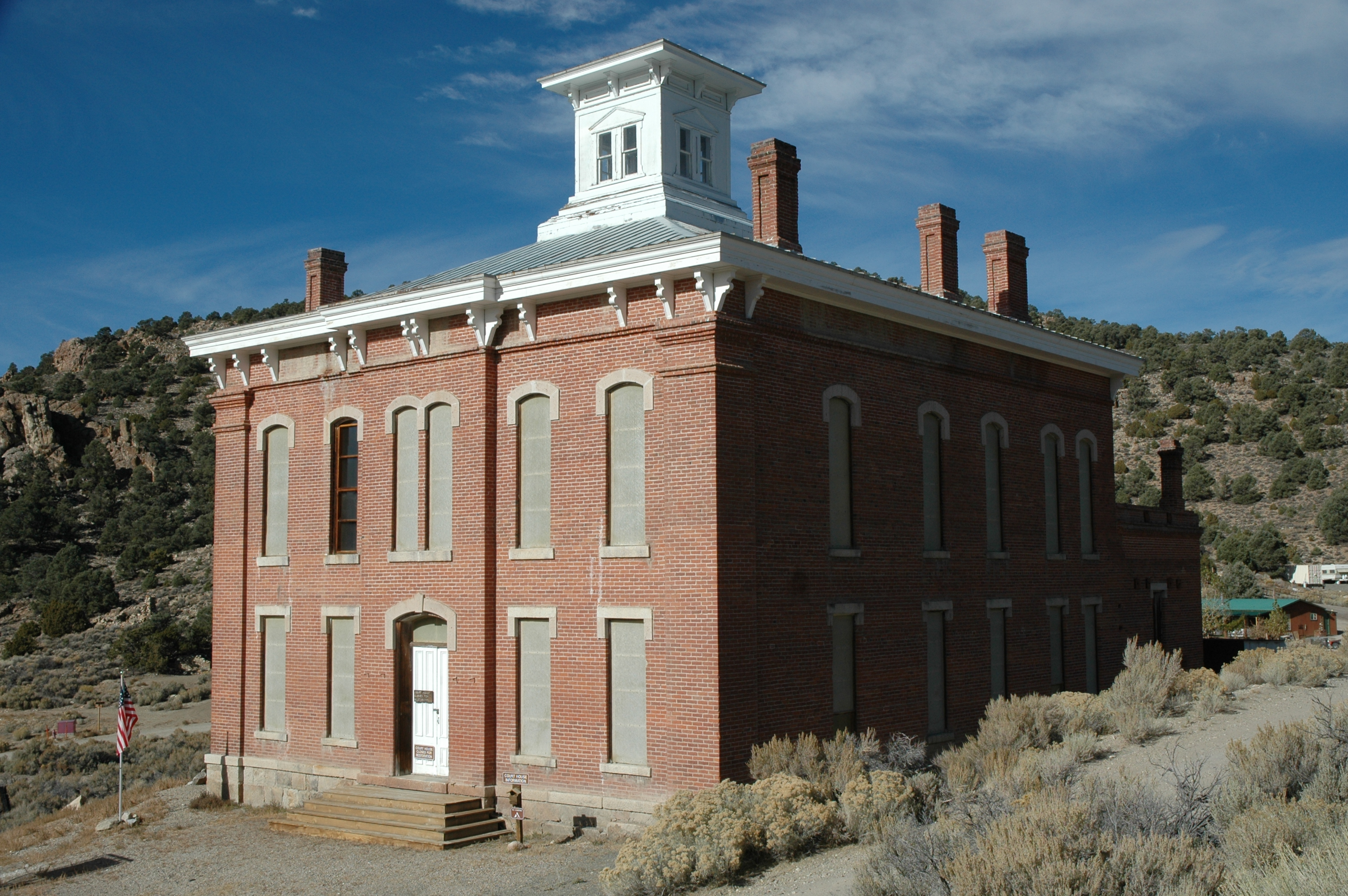
The Original Nye County Courthouse in Belmont, Nevada closed for renovation, October 2009

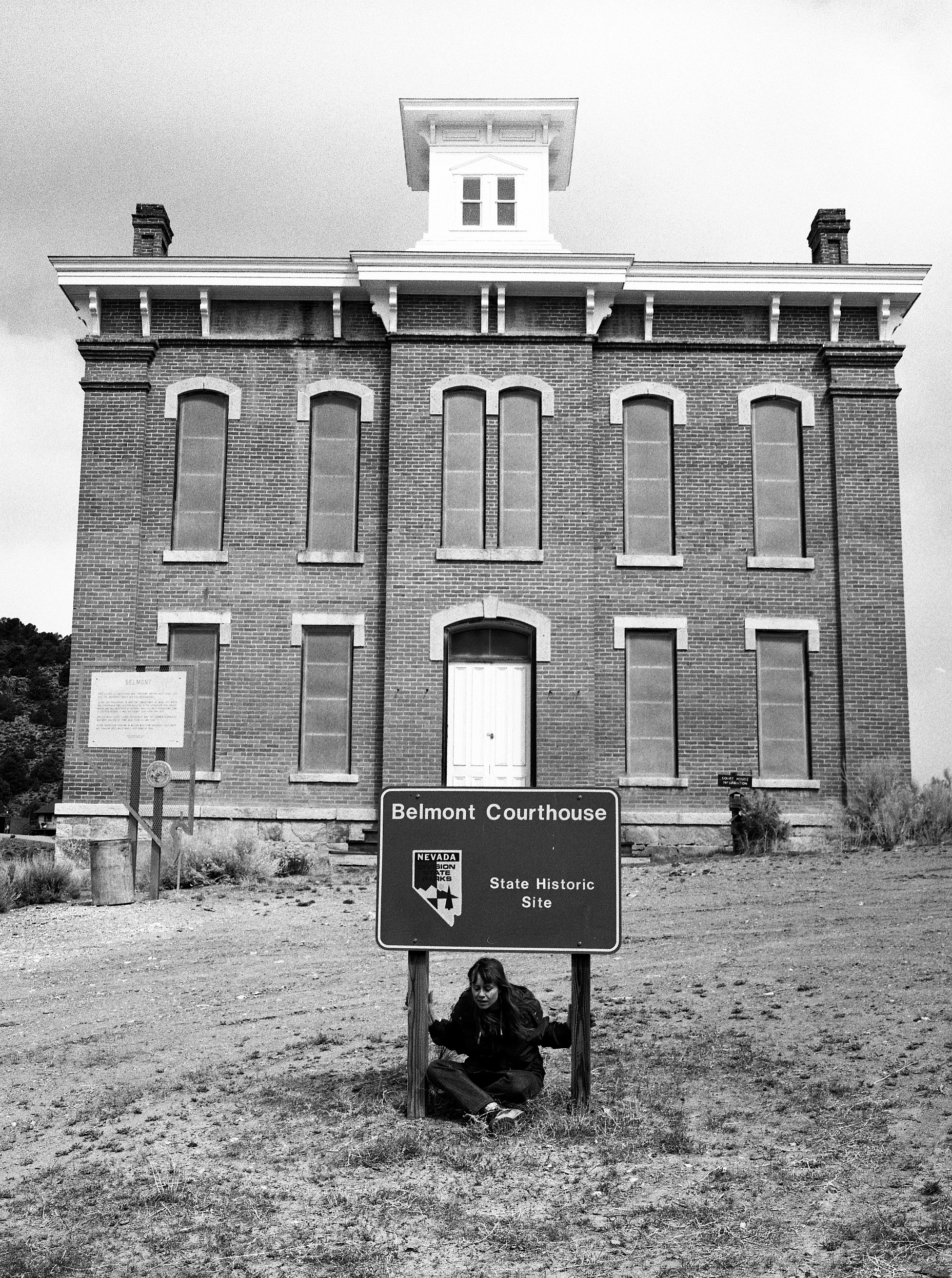
Original courthouse in Belmont

The courthouse in Tonopah was designed by J.C. Robertson and completed in 1905. A jail, also designed by Robertson, was added in 1907. It has been expanded with concrete block additions, while a glass vestibule obscures the entrance arch.
