= Unseen (organization) =

Anti-slavery charity

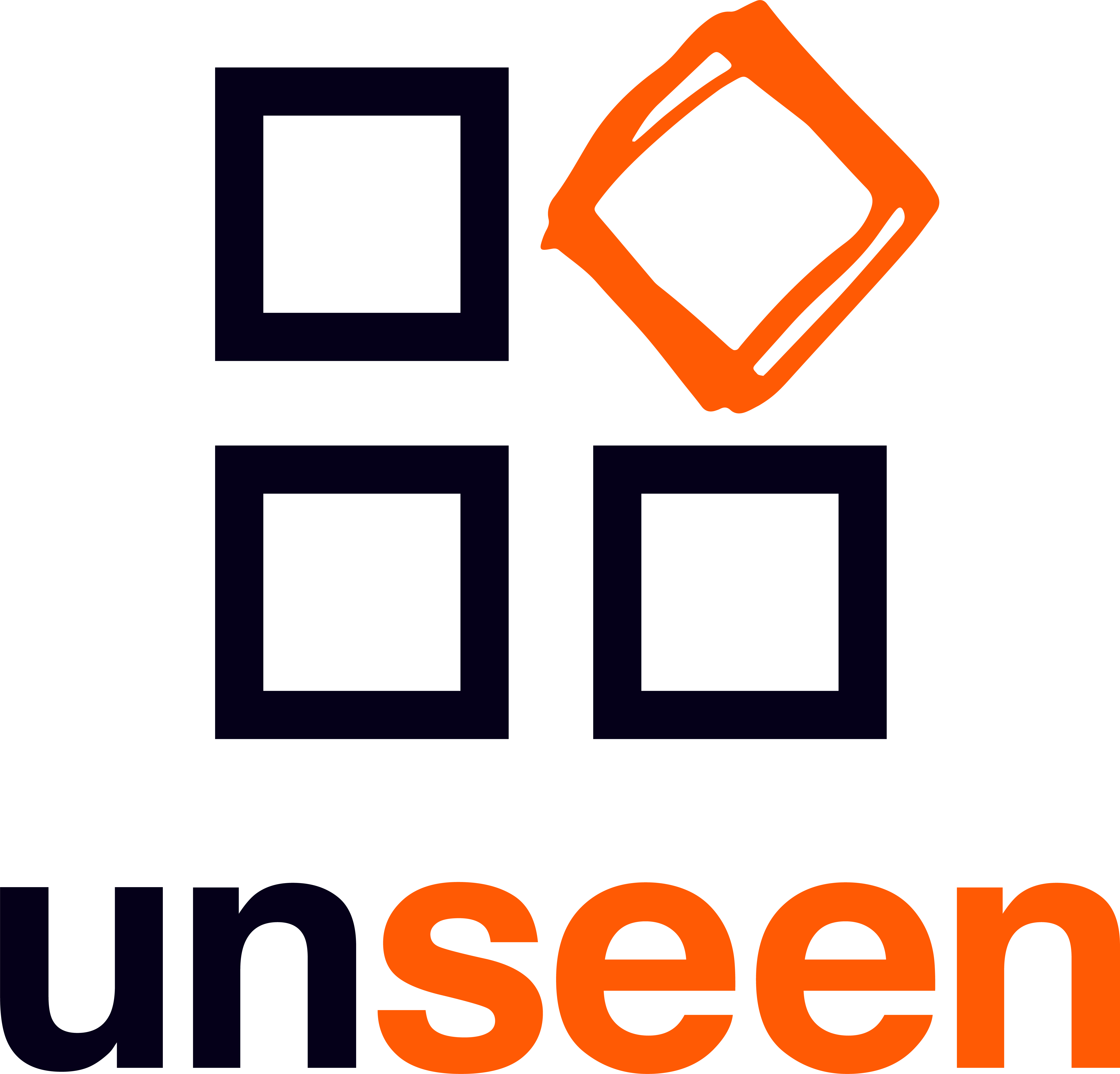
Unseen logo

Unseen is a UK-based anti-slavery charity, founded in 2008, working towards a world without slavery. Unseen provides safehouses and support in the community for survivors of human trafficking and modern slavery. The charity also runs the Modern Slavery & Exploitation Helpline and works with individuals, communities, business, governments, statutory agencies and other charities across various sectors in the fight to end slavery for good. Unseen was founded by Kate Garbers and its current CEO Andrew Wallis.

== Safehouses and work in the community ==
Unseen's approach to fighting modern slavery is to tackle it from all sides – both the causes and the symptoms. Unseen provides specialist care for survivors of human trafficking and exploitation, including emergency safehouse accommodation and outreach support in order to rebuild safe and productive lives in the community.

== Working with business ==
Unseen's business services are designed to help companies address labour abuse and exploitation in their supply chains and their operations, as well as manage future risks. In 2020 Unseen stepped up the marketing of their business services – which now includes consultancy and exclusive modern slavery reports via their Business Portal.

Unseen’s Business Portal gives businesses access to information they receive about cases of abuse and labour exploitation related to their business or sector.

Among those that have joined the list of businesses working with Unseen are Sainsbury's, Aldi, PMP Recruitment and the Wellcome Trust.

== Modern slavery training ==
Unseen provides training to businesses and other organisations, such as statutory agencies, working to prevent modern slavery or supporting survivors.

In addition to making people more aware of modern slavery and how to spot the signs, their training encourages participants to discuss areas of risk in their business operations, explore mitigation and remediation strategies, and examine ways to improve and strengthen their overall approach.

Due to the COVID-19 pandemic, much of Unseen's scheduled face-to-face training for 2020 was postponed or cancelled. As a result, Unseen expanded their e-learning programmes and now has e-learning courses ranging from general training on modern slavery, training for first responders, and training for procurement specialists. The charity also has sector-specific e-learning packages aimed at industries such construction, finance, food and agriculture.

== Anti-Slavery Partnerships ==
The Anti-Slavery Partnerships’ (ASP) mission is to support and enable the discovery of, and response to, incidents of human trafficking, modern slavery and exploitation. The Partnerships do this through a victim-centred, multi-agency and collaborative effort at both a local and regional level.

Unseen founded the South West Regional, Bedfordshire and Eastern Region ASPs, and continues to coordinate and chair them.

== Influencing government and society ==
Unseen's advocacy work aims to influence legislation, policy and consumer practices - from producing studies on new issues that they have identified, to presenting at conferences, seminars and other events; from working with the UK government, and raising awareness of modern slavery issues in the media.

== Modern Slavery & Exploitation Helpline ==
The UK-wide Modern Slavery & Exploitation Helpline is a confidential and independent helpline providing information, advice and guidance on any modern slavery issue to potential victims, businesses, statutory agencies and the public. It is an important part of both their support work and their influence work.

Open 365 days a year, the Helpline takes calls from across the UK and in some circumstances internationally. It does not receive Government funding.

The Helpline can liaise with callers in more than 200 languages. Callers who are potential victims are offered help to connect with law enforcement agencies to get out of a situation of exploitation and stay safe.

In July 2018, Unseen launched the Unseen App, allowing smartphone users to download the free app, enabling them to understand the types of modern slavery, spot the signs and report it to the Helpline.

== Awards ==
2013 Centre for Social Justice Award

2015 Charity Times Charity of the Year Award

2018 GSK IMPACT Award

2019 Campaign for Good Awards - Winner, Best Equality and Inclusion Campaign
