= Social Service Review =

- Discipline: Social work
- Language: English

Publication details
- History: 1927-present
- Publisher: University of Chicago Press for the Crown Family School of Social Work, Policy, and Practice (United States)
- Frequency: Quarterly
- Impact factor: 2.2 (2024)

Standard abbreviations
- Bluebook: Soc. Serv. Rev.
- ISO 4: Soc. Serv. Rev.

Indexing
- ISSN: 0037-7961 (print); 1537-5404 (web)
- LCCN: 29008588
- JSTOR: 00377961
- OCLC no.: 470187782

Links
- Journal homepage

Social Service Review is an academic journal published by the University of Chicago Press that publishes original research on social issues, social welfare policy, and social work practice. The Journal was established in 1927, making it the oldest continually published social welfare journal in the United States. Since its founding, it has been housed at the Crown Family School of Social Work, Policy, and Practice at the University of Chicago.

The current editor-in-chief is Jennifer Mosley. The faculty of the Crown Family School serves as the journal's editorial board, and it also has an External Review Board of scholars at other institutions from multiple academic disciplines.

Social Service Review publishes four times each year. Most issues include between four and six original research articles, reflecting a multi-disciplinary range of research methodologies and analytical frameworks. Most issues also contain at least one book review, as well as a Brief Notices section listing new books "of interest to social work and social welfare scholars."

== Past editors ==
Past editors-in-chief of the journal have been:

- Edith Abbott and Sophonisba Breckinridge (1927-1934)
- Grace Abbott (1934-1939)
- Edith Abbott (1939-1952)
- Helen R. Wright (1953-1956)
- Rachel B. Marks (1956-1973)
- Frank R. Bruel (1974-1986)
- John R. Schuerman (1987-1999)
- Michael R. Sosin (1999-2013)
- Susan J. Lambert (2013-2016)
- Mark E. Courtney (2016-2021)
- Jennifer E. Mosley (2021-present)

== Abstracting and indexing ==
The journal is abstracted and indexed in:

- ProQuest databases
- Applied Social Sciences Index & Abstracts
- International Bibliography of the Social Sciences
- PAIS International
- Social Services Abstracts
- Sociological Abstracts
- Worldwide Political Science Abstracts
- EBSCO databases
- Social Sciences Citation Index
- Current Contents/Social and Behavioral Sciences

According to the Journal Citation Reports, the journal has a 2024 impact factor of 2.2.
