= Thomas P. Kennard House =

Historic house in Nebraska, United States

- U.S. National Register of Historic Places
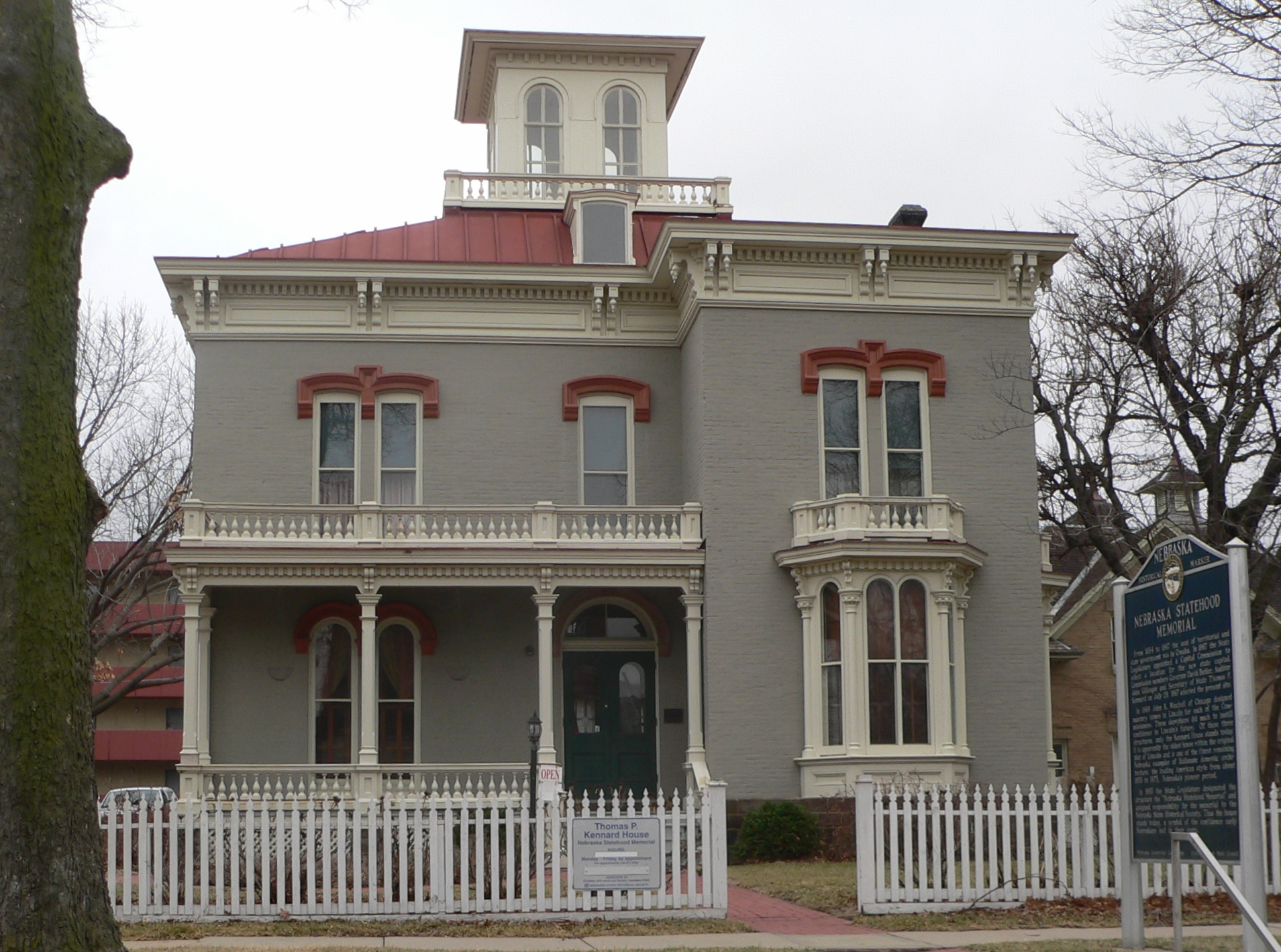

- Location within Nebraska Location within the United States
- Location: 1627 H Street, Lincoln, Nebraska
- Coordinates: 40°48′24″N 96°41′49″W
- Area: less than one acre
- Built: 1869
- Architectural style: Italianate
- NRHP reference No.: 69000134
- Added to NRHP: April 16, 1969

The Thomas P. Kennard House, also known as the Nebraska Statehood Memorial, is the oldest remaining building in the original plat of Lincoln, Nebraska. Built in 1869, the Italianate house belonged to Thomas P. Kennard, the first Secretary of State for Nebraska, and one of three men who picked the Lincoln site for the new state's capital in 1867. The house was designed by architect John Keys Winchell of Chicago.

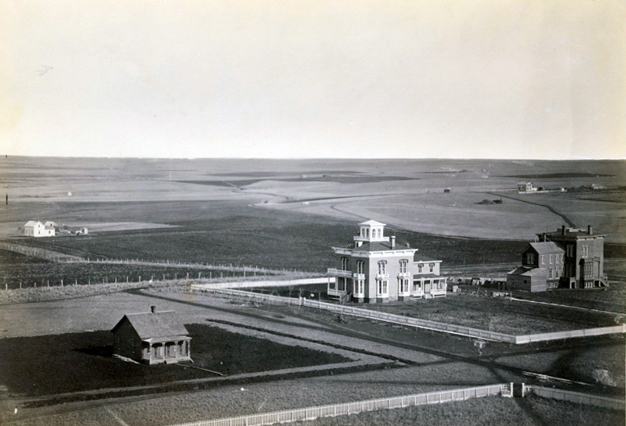
Kennard and John Gillespie (auditor) houses in 1872

In 1965 the Kennard House was designated the Nebraska Statehood Memorial, and became a museum. It was placed on the National Register of Historic Places on April 16, 1969.

The house is a 2 1/2-story stuccoed brick building with a frame cupola on the shallow-pitched hip roof. The house was extensively altered inside and out before its designation as a memorial and required major restoration work to return its appearance to its original state.

Kennard, Nebraska is named for Thomas P. Kennard.

== See also ==
- List of the oldest buildings in Nebraska
