= Grace Abbott =

American social worker (1878–1939)

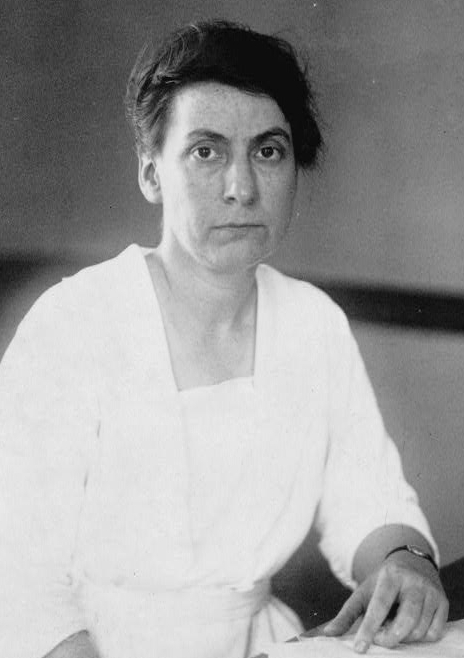
- Grace Abbott in 1929
- Born: November 17, 1878; Grand Island, Nebraska, US
- Died: June 19, 1939 (aged 60); Chicago, Illinois, US
- Occupation: Social worker
- Father: Othman A. Abbott

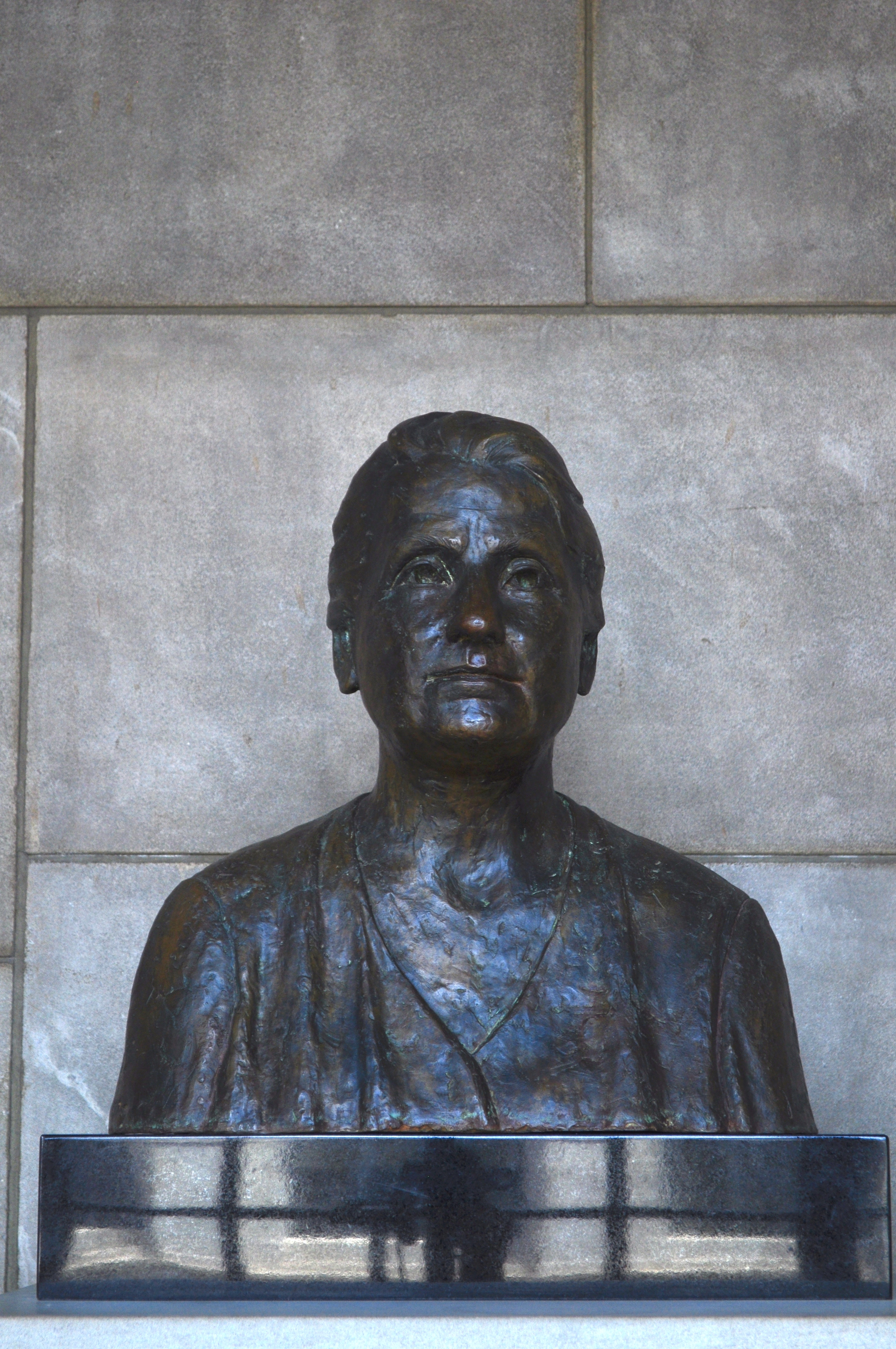
Bust of Grace Abbott created in 1978 by James T. Olsen for the Nebraska Hall of Fame.

Grace Abbott (November 17, 1878 – June 19, 1939) was an American social worker who specifically worked in improving the rights of immigrants and advancing child welfare, especially the regulation of child labor. She served as director of the U.S. Children's Bureau from 1921 to 1934.

== Biography ==
Grace Abbott was born in Grand Island, Nebraska, to a family of reformers on November 17 1878. Her father, O. A. Abbott, was active in politics and her mother, Elizabeth M. Griffin, was an abolitionist and early suffragist. Her elder sister, Edith Abbott, was a social worker, educator, and researcher, professional interests that often complemented Grace's.

Abbott graduated from Grand Island College in 1898. Before embarking on her career in social work, she was employed as a high school teacher in her hometown through 1906. In 1903, she started graduate studies at the University of Nebraska.

In 1907, she moved to Chicago, where she entered the career of social work. She took up residency in the Hull House, an urban center for women engaged in early proto-feminism and social reform, as well as a safe haven for the poor. In 1909, Abbott received a Ph.M. in political science from the University of Chicago. She wrote a series of weekly articles in the Chicago Evening Post, titled Within the City's Gates from 1909 to 1910, which brought to light the exploitation of immigrants.

Abbott served on several committees and organizations for advancing the societal cause of child welfare, including the Immigrants' Protective League (1908-1917), the National Consumers' League, and the Women's Trade Union League. In 1911, she co-founded the Joint Committee for Vocational Training with Sophonisba Breckenridge, PhD, JD, and Edith Abbott, PhD, JD.

From 1917 to 1919, she worked for the U.S. Children's Bureau, under Julia Lathrop. Abbott was the director of the child labor division of the agency, and it was in this capacity that she was responsible for administering the Keating-Owen Act (1916). This law was reversed by the U.S. Supreme Court in 1918. She was responsible for portions of this law continuing by inserting clauses into the war-goods contracts between the federal government and private industries.

After working for the Illinois State Immigrants Commission from 1919 to 1921, Abbott was appointed by President Warren G. Harding as director of the U.S. Children's Bureau. She directed the bureau from 1921 until 1934. During this period, one of her main responsibilities was overseeing the enforcement of the Sheppard-Towner Act.

In 1924, she worked tirelessly to pass a constitutional amendment against child labor, an amendment that never gained statewide ratification. Abbott was an author of several sociological texts, including The Immigrant and the Community (1917) and The Child and the State (1938, 2 volumes).

Abbott served as president of the National Conference of Social Work from 1923 to 1924, and was a member of the committee that organized the first Conference on Social Work, held in Paris, in 1928. In addition to her responsibilities at the Children’s Bureau, from 1922 to 1934, Abbott was the official representative of the U.S. on the League of Nations' advisory committees on trafficking of women and on child welfare.

Abbott pioneered the process of incorporating sociological data relating to child labor, juvenile delinquency, dependency, and statistics into the lawmaking process; she spent much of her time as a political lobbyist for social issues in Washington, D.C. She was associated with the Social Security Administration from 1934 until her death in 1939; during that time period, Abbott helped draft the Social Security Act and chaired several government committees on child welfare and social issues. In addition, after leaving the Children's Bureau in 1934, she taught at the University of Chicago School of Social Service Administration until her death five years later.

Like many professional women of her generation, Abbott never married.

During a 1938 health checkup, doctors discovered that she was suffering from multiple myeloma. The disease caused her death one year later. Cancer was considered such a dreaded disease at the time that she and her sister hid her diagnosis and her obituary in The New York Times listed her cause of death as "anemia".

Abbott is a member of the Nebraska Hall of Fame, inducted in 1976.

The School of Social Work at the University of Nebraska Omaha is named in her honor.
