= William H. James =

American state politician (1831–1920)

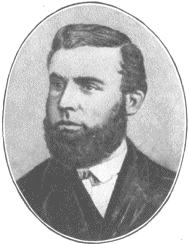

Acting Governor of Nebraska
- In office June 2, 1871 – January 13, 1873
- Preceded by: David Butler
- Succeeded by: Robert Wilkinson Furnas

Personal details
- Born: October 16, 1831 Marion, Ohio
- Died: February 1, 1920 (aged 88) Colfax, Washington
- Party: Republican
- Profession: Lawyer

William Hartford James (October 16, 1831 – February 1, 1920) was a Republican Nebraska politician who served as the acting governor of Nebraska from 1871 to 1873. He was also a member of the University of Nebraska Board of Regents during his tenure as governor.

== Early life ==
James was born at Marion, Ohio. He attended the public school and Marion Academy for two years and worked on the family farm. He began studying law on his own, and in 1853, James moved to Des Moines, Iowa, and joined a law firm. He was admitted to the Iowa Bar Association in 1855 and moved to Sergeant Bluff to start his own legal practice. He married Louisa Epler and they had four children.

== Career ==
In 1857, James moved to Nebraska and staked a homestead claim in Dakota County. He soon became active in local politics, serving as Justice of the Peace and County Attorney for Dakota County. In 1864 President Abraham Lincoln appointed James as register of the Dakota County Land Office. After serving as register of the Dakota County Land Office for five years, James then ran on the Republican ticket and was elected Secretary of State in 1870. In 1871, with the impeachment of Governor David Butler, James became Acting Governor of Nebraska until January 13, 1873. He was a member of the University of Nebraska board of regents from 1871 to 1873.

== Later life ==
After serving out his term as acting governor, James returned to his legal practice. In 1877, he was appointed register of the Colfax, Washington, Land Office. He held that position until his death in 1920. He is interred in Colfax, Washington.

Political offices
Preceded by Thomas P. Kennard	Nebraska Secretary of State; 1871 – 1873	Succeeded by John J. Gosper
Preceded by David Butler; Governor	Acting Governor of Nebraska; 1871 – 1873	Succeeded by Robert Wilkinson Furnas; Governor
