= Othman A. Abbott =

American politician

Othman Ali Abbott
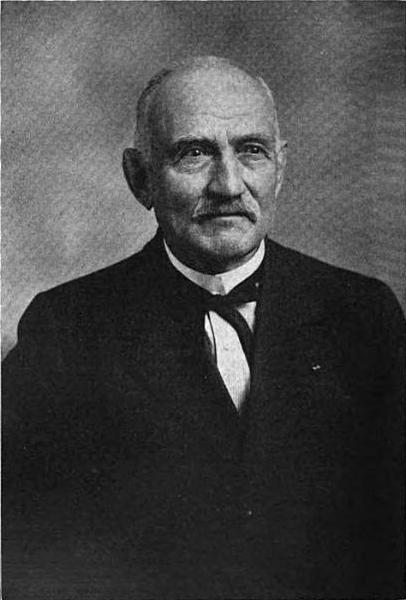
- Abbot prior to 1920

1st Lieutenant Governor of Nebraska
- In office 1877–1879
- Governor: Silas Garber
- Preceded by: Position established
- Succeeded by: Edmund C. Carns

Personal details
- Born: September 19, 1842 Hatley, Quebec, Canada
- Died: June 24, 1935 (aged 92) Grand Island, Nebraska, US
- Party: Republican
- Spouse: Elizabeth M. Griffin (m. 1873)
- Children: Othman A. Jr. (1874–1954); Edith (1876–1957); Grace (1878–1939); Arthur Griffin (1880–1969)

Othman Ali Abbott (September 19, 1842 – June 24, 1935) was the first lieutenant governor of Nebraska, United States, serving from 1877 to 1879 while Silas Garber was Governor.

== Biography ==
Abbott was born on September 19, 1842, in Hatley, Quebec, Canada to Abiel B. and Sarah (Young) Abbott. The family moved to DeKalb County, Illinois, when he was about 8, and Abbott attended high school in Belvidere. At the start of the Civil War in 1861 he enlisted, and served until 1865 eventually attaining the rank of first lieutenant. He began to study law while in the Army and after returning to Belvidere completed those studies and obtained admission to the bar in 1867. Soon after this, he moved to Grand Island, Nebraska. He became active in Nebraska politics, and was chosen to complete an unexpired term in the state senate in 1872.

In 1876 he was elected as the first lieutenant governor for Nebraska, and served one two-year term in that position.

Abbott and his wife Elizabeth were married on February 9, 1873, and subsequently had four children; Othman A. Jr., Edith, Grace, and Arthur G. Grace and Edith became well-known social workers. (Othman's wife, as well as Edith and Grace, have been inducted into the Women of Nebraska Hall of Fame.)

Abbott continued to practice law and trade and live in Grand Island, where he died on June 24, 1935.

Political offices
Preceded by Office Created	Lieutenant Governor of Nebraska; 1877 – 1879	Succeeded by Edmund C. Carns
