= Earl Carpenter (politician) =

American politician (1894–1963)

Member of the Nebraska Legislature from the 32nd district
- In office January 5, 1937 – January 3, 1939
- Preceded by: Position created
- Succeeded by: Daniel Garber

Personal details
- Born: July 10, 1894 Douglas, Nebraska
- Died: May 17, 1963 (aged 68) Red Cloud, Nebraska
- Party: Democratic
- Spouse(s): Olive Grace Reeve (m. 1917; died 1944) Fannie Grice (m. 1959)
- Education: Nebraska Wesleyan University
- Occupation: Farmer

Military service
- Allegiance: United States
- Branch/service: United States Army

Earl Wilfred Carpenter (July 10, 1894 – May 17, 1963) was a Democratic politician from Nebraska who served as a member of the Nebraska Legislature from the 32nd district from 1937 to 1939.

== Early life ==
Carpenter was born in Douglas, Nebraska, in 1894, and graduated from Douglas High School. He attended Nebraska Wesleyan University, and taught school for several years while taking law courses at a correspondence school. Carpenter served in the U.S. Army as a second lieutenant during World War II. He was a farmer in Guide Rock, and served as the director of the Glenwood Telephone Company.

== Nebraska Legislature ==
In 1936, Carpenter ran for the Nebraska Legislature from the 32nd district. In the nonpartisan primary, he faced H. H. Hester, George Larsen, William Magarin, J. M. Silver, Randolph Soker, State Representatives Walter Hawthorn, Henry Hansen, and State Senator Leon Sprague. Carpenter and Sprague advanced to the general election, which Carpenter won with 52 percent of the vote. Though the race was formally nonpartisan, Carpenter identified as a Democrat.

Carpenter ran for re-election in 1938, and was challenged by Anton Hansen, Hanthorn, former State Representative Daniel Garber, W. D. Moore, and former State Senator Murray F. Rickard. Carpenter placed first in the primary, winning 30 percent of the vote, and advanced to the general election with Garber, who placed second with 22 percent. Garber defeated Carpenter with 53 percent of the vote.

== Post-legislative career ==
After leaving the legislature, Carpenter served as the head of the Webster County Veterans Service Office and the County Welfare Department. In 1956, when County Judge Harry M. Barrows resigned, Carpenter ran to replace him, and gathered petitions to appear on the general election ballot. He was narrowly defeated by William Letson.

== Death ==
Carpenter died on May 17, 1963.
