= Kate Garbers =

British anti-slavery activist (born 1981)

- Born: 1981 (age 44–45)
- Occupations: Non-profit director Human-rights activist
- Organization: Unseen charity
- Known for: Fighting modern slavery
- Awards: Influencer Award; Amnesty International; McWhirter Foundation

Kate Garbers (born 1981) is a founder and former managing director of the Bristol, UK-based anti-slavery organisation and charity Unseen. She has developed projects to support survivors of slavery, and assists and advises survivors. She also works with law enforcement agencies and governments on how to tackle trafficking, including contributing to the Modern Slavery Act 2015 and the National Referral Mechanism Review.

== Career ==
Garbers became an activist after working with children in a Ukrainian orphanage and learning there would be no help or places for them to go. This gave rise to problems including alcohol and drug abuse, homelessness, human trafficking and prostitution, which local police had difficulty dealing with.

Garbers teamed up with Andrew Wallis, an anti-trafficking campaigner, to establish Unseen UK in November 2008 and later opened southwest England's first safe house for women victims of trafficking in Bristol.

Unseen's "Let's Nail It" campaign was supported by Bristol East MP Kerry McCarthy and Bristol North West MP Darren Jones. As well as campaigning against exploitation of employees working in nail-bars, Garbers has highlighted exploitation of workers in car-wash facilities, including in 2016 when Garbers and Unseen staff participated in visits with 50 police resources dispatched to 24 business locations in Devon and Cornwall in a multi-agency operation across five forces, and led by the National Crime Agency, over possible labour exploitation.

In 2018, Garbers spoke at the TEDxExeter conference about modern slavery.

== Awards ==
In 2012, Garbers received a Citizenship Award from the McWhirter Foundation. In 2015, Unseen was given a Charity Times Award for Best Charity under £1 million. In 2017, Garbers received the Influencer Award, a UK national Social Change Award for her work combatting human trafficking, including contributing to the Modern Slavery Act 2015 and the National Referral Mechanism Review.

On International Women's Day in March 2018, Amnesty International recognized Garbers as one of six "ordinary women who are changing the world" by campaigning against modern injustices. She was also named as one of the 100 most influential women in the west of England for her work fighting modern-day slavery at a local, national and international level.
