= Chris Garbers =

- Born: August 21, 1929 (age 97)
- Education: University of Pretoria; University of Zurich
- Children: 4

Chris Garbers is a South African scientist and former President of the Council for Scientific and Industrial Research. He was a member of the UNESCO/IUPAC International Chemistry Council for four years and served on President Nelson Mandela's National Commission on Higher Education.

== Biography ==
After working at the Council for Scientific and Industrial Research (CSIR) in South Africa, in 1958 Garbers accepted a post at the University of Stellenbosch and progressed to Professor of Organic Chemistry and Director of the Joint CSIR/University of Stellenbosch Unit for Polyene Chemistry. He returned to the CSIR in 1979 as vice-president and in 1980 became President of the council, retiring 10 years later.

In the transition to a democratic South Africa Garbers served as a member of the Working Group of the ANC, Congress of South African Trade Unions (Cosatu), and Sanco on the Science and Technology Initiative, the Advisory Group to the Minister of Arts, Culture Science and Technology. He was a member of the Unesco/IUPAC International Chemistry Council for four years from 1995 and during 1995/96 served on President Nelson Mandela's National Commission on Higher Education.

== Education ==
Garbers was awarded a B.Sc. (Mathematics and Chemistry) and subsequently a M.Sc. (Chemistry), both degrees with distinction, from the University of Pretoria. He continued his studies at the University of Zurich, Switzerland under Nobel Laureate Paul Karrer, completing the D.Phil. degree with distinction in 1954. He is author of 67 scientific publications and has contributed to three books.

== Awards and accolades ==
Among the accolades Garbers has received are the State President's Order for Meritorious Service and the South Africa Medal (Gold) from the South African Association for the Advancement of Science. Honorary doctorates were conferred on him by the Universities of South Africa (1989), Cape Town (1990), Stellenbosch (1991), and Pretoria (1994).
