= Edith Abbott =

American economist

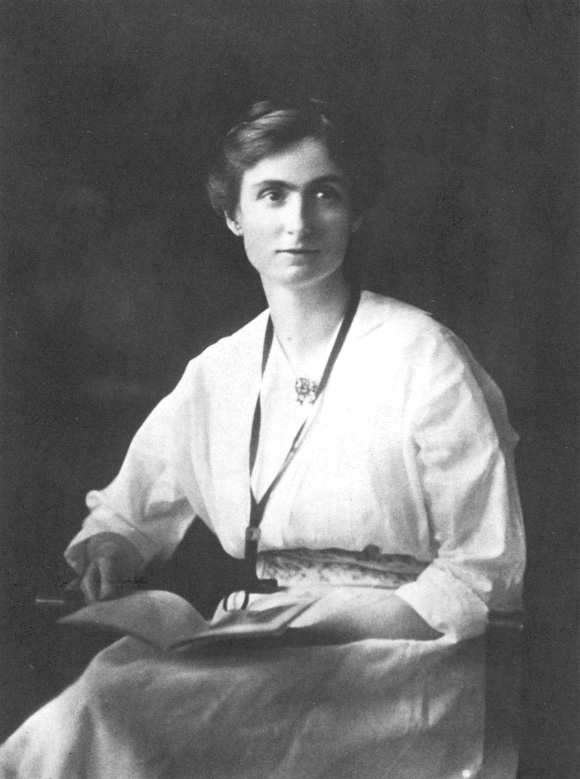
- Born: September 26, 1876; Grand Island, Nebraska, US
- Died: July 28, 1957 (aged 80); Grand Island, Nebraska, US
- Occupations: Economist, social worker, educator, author
- Parent: Othman A. Abbott

Edith Abbott (September 26, 1876 – July 28, 1957) was an American economist, statistician, social worker, educator, and author. Abbott was born in Grand Island, Nebraska. Abbott was a pioneer in the profession of social work with an educational background in economics. She was a leading activist in social reform with the ideals that humanitarianism needed to be embedded in education. Abbott was also in charge of implementing social work studies to the graduate level. Though she was met with resistance on her work with social reform at the University of Chicago, she ultimately was successful and was elected as the school's dean in 1924, making her one of the first female deans in the United States. Abbott was foremost an educator and saw her work as a combination of legal studies and humanitarian work which shows in her social security legislation. She is known as an economist who pursued implementing social work at the graduate level. Her younger sister was Grace Abbott.

Social work will never become a profession—except through the professional schools

— Edith Abbott

The Edith Abbott Memorial Library, in Grand Island, Nebraska, is named after her.

== Early life ==
Edith was born on September 26, 1876, in Grand Island, Nebraska. Her father, Othman Ali Abbott, was a lawyer and Nebraska's first Lieutenant Governor (1877–1879). Her mother, Elizabeth Maletta Griffin, was an abolitionist and suffrage leader. Both parents instilled values of women's rights, equality, and social reform into Edith and her sister Grace, inspiring their future work. Grace Abbott had many accomplishments working as a social worker, child labor legislation reformer, and chief of the United States Children's Bureau (1921–1934), also working with Edith on many different professional projects during their careers.

== Education ==
In 1893, Abbott graduated from Brownell Hall, a girls' boarding school in Omaha. However, her family could not afford to send her to college due to a drought which struck Nebraska and eventually led to an economic depression. Instead of going to college immediately, Abbott began to teach high school in Grand Island, Nebraska. Determined to receive a college education, Abbott took correspondence courses and night classes until she was able to afford to fully enroll. Abbott enrolled at the University of Nebraska, receiving her degree in 1901. She continued to teach for two more years and was eventually awarded a fellowship to the University of Chicago. While at the University of Chicago working on her doctorate, she met Professor Sophonisba Breckinridge. She earned her doctorate in political economy in 1905. Later, Abbott and Breckinridge would publish multiple studies while at the Chicago School of Civics and Philanthropy. In 1905, Abbott graduated, receiving her Ph.D. in economics.

In 1906, Abbott received a Carnegie Fellowship and continued her studies at University College London, and the London School of Economics. She learned from social reformers Sidney Webb and Beatrice Webb, who championed new approaches to dealing with poverty. The Webbs influenced the direction of Abbott's career. The Webbs were in favour of repealing the British "poor laws"—which they viewed as demeaning to people in poverty—and they supported establishing programs to eliminate poverty. While studying in London, Abbott lived part of the time in a social reformers' settlement in a poverty-stricken area of the East End, where she gained experience in social work.

== Early career ==
Abbott returned to the United States in 1907 after her years studying in London, and took a job teaching economics at Wellesley College. Though her job at Wellesley was highly regarded for a woman with a Ph.D. at the time, she desired to return to Chicago. She got her chance in 1908 when Sophonisba Breckinridge, then Director of Social Research at the independent Chicago School of Civics and Philanthropy, offered her a job teaching statistics in the Department of Social Investigation.

Abbott moved into Jane Addams's Hull House with her sister, Grace, when she moved back to Chicago. At that time, Hull House was renowned as a mecca for educated women, for its vibrant community of residing revolutionary thinkers. Grace and Edith Abbott added to the reform-minded community as they contributed significantly through their commitment to social reform advocacy and scholarship of statistical research.

The long-lasting professional partnership between Abbott and Breckinridge first started during their years together at the School of Civics and Philanthropy. They shared a common interest in detailed statistical investigations of contemporary social problems which they believed they could use to spark reform advocacy. As a result of her experience in statistical research, following a crime wave in Chicago in 1914 Abbott was commissioned to investigate statistics on crime and criminals in the city. This led to a ground-breaking report titled "Statistics Relating to Crime in Chicago", published in 1915.

During the first 12 years of their collaboration at the Department of Social Investigation, Abbott and Breckinridge jointly produced 'The Housing Problem in Chicago', which consisted of ten articles in the American Journal of Sociology (1910–15) reporting the results of their major survey of tenement conditions in Chicago. (A follow-up study, The Tenements of Chicago, 1908–1935, was published in 1936); The Delinquent Child and the Home (1912), a study of Chicago's juvenile court; and Truancy and Non-Attendance in the Chicago Schools (1917), an investigation which led them to support compulsory school attendance and child labour legislation. In 1927, in dedication to the "scientific and professional interests of social work", Abbott and Breckinridge jointly established the distinguished academic journal, Social Service Review, published by the University of Chicago Press.

With the joint efforts of Abbott and Breckinridge, in 1920, the University of Chicago's Board of Trustees voted to rename the School the University of Chicago Graduate School of Social Service Administration. It was the first graduate school of social work in the country affiliated with a major research university. Abbott was hired as an associate professor of social economy, and was named dean in 1924. She became the first US woman to become the dean of an American graduate school. Abbott, along with Breckinridge, transformed the field of social work by emphasizing the importance of formal education in social work and the need to include field experience as part of the training. They designed a curriculum that heavily emphasized social statistics as the historical, legal, economic and political root causes of social problems and public welfare efforts. In addition, they fought for the professional status of social work. In 1931, Abbott collected many of her papers, addresses and speeches on social service education and created a single volume entitled Social Welfare and Professional Education (1931, revised and enlarged in 1942).

Abbott focused her attention on her students to portray the basic principles that can be transmitted to students. She states these principles must derive from "a critical examination of the methods used to produce certain results and a searching equally for the causes of apparent failure and apparent success." Abbott derived a curriculum for students that desired a career in social work.

== Later career ==
Abbott was a prominent immigration expert, working for reforms that would end exploitation of immigrants. She was appointed chair of the Committee on Crime and the Foreign Born of the Wickersham National Commission on Law Observance and Enforcement (1929–31).

Through her advocacy, Abbott wrote in scholarly articles, book reviews, and governmental reports in which she discussed issues such as women's and children's rights, crime, immigration, and public assistance. She also stressed the importance of a public welfare administration, the need for a more humane social welfare system, and the responsibility of the state in addressing social problems.

Many of the contributions during Abbott's career were dedicated to addressing welfare reform and adopting more humane standards for welfare treatment. In 1926, Abbott helped establish the Cook County Bureau of Public Welfare. Abbott and Breckinridge founded the Social Service Review in 1927, which, still administered by the University of Chicago, "is committed to examining social welfare policy and practice and evaluating its effects." Throughout the Great Depression, Edith Abbott worked alongside her sister to combat a wide array of social ills, from the mistreatment of immigrants to the abuses of child labor. In 1935, Abbott assisted in drafting the Social Security Act.

Edith Abbott also had a significant role in the public sphere. Abbott was known to be a confidante and special consultant to Harry Hopkins, adviser to President Franklin D. Roosevelt. In 1950, Abbott was known to have been appointed to a single case on the California Supreme Court, making her the first woman to sit on the state's supreme court.

The death of Edith's sister, Grace, in 1939 caused Edith to become quarrelsome and lonely, and slowly she began to withdraw herself from public life. In 1941, she published her final book, Public Assistance, and in 1942 she officially retired as the Dean of the School of Social Service Administration. Edith Abbott spent her remaining years living with her family in their home in Grand Island, Nebraska, where she died of pneumonia in 1957. She left the bulk of her estate to the Grand Island Public Library. She also left a trust for a collection of nonfiction books in memory of her mother, Elizabeth Abbott. At the time of Edith Abbott's death in 1957, Wayne McMillen of Social Service Review wrote, "History will include her name among the handful of leaders who have made enduring contributions to the field of education. Social work has now taken its place as an established profession. She, more than any other one person, gave direction to the education required for that profession. Posterity will not forget achievements such as these."

The sisters are buried together in Grand Island Cemetery.

== Publications ==
=== Women in Industry (1910) ===
Inspired by her question of women's 'compensation history' in the workforce Abbott worked in collaboration with Breckinridge who did a large amount of work with legality and economic status of women to write Women in Industry. The book was a milestone in feminist economy writings. Ultimately Women and Industry looked at the wages and labor history from an economic standpoint while at the same time keeping the social causations at the center of her research.

=== The Delinquent Child and the Home (1912) ===
The Delinquent Child and the Home: A Study of The Delinquent Wards Of The Juvenile Court of Chicago was published in 1912. It is another collaborative study done by Abbott and her colleague Breckinridge. The study deals with the court in its relation to the families and homes from which the delinquent wards come. It is considered an important work to the field of juvenile delinquency, which itself defends the juvenile court forcefully.

=== The Real Jail Problem (1915) ===
Edith Abbott's book, The Real Jail Problem, discusses the issues with Cook County's jailing system, and the poor conditions of those who are incarcerated have to face. In her book Abbott discusses the problems of imprisonment, and how this leads to suffering and humiliation for those who have been jailed. The issues she pointed to were those who were imprisoned because they could not make bail, those who are determined guilty, and those who face long term imprisonment. This work helped analyze specific elements of the criminal justice system and defined the social problems associated with imprisonment.

=== Truancy and non-attendance in the Chicago Schools (1917) ===
Truancy and non-attendance in the Chicago school; a study of the social aspects of the compulsory education and child labor legislation of Illinois was published in 1917 by the University of Chicago Press. Abbott and her colleague Sophonisba Preston Breckinridge co-authored the study while researching at the University of Chicago's Chicago School of Civics and Philanthropy. Abbott and Breckinridge examined non-attendance during compulsory-attendance period, and lack of enforcement of child labor laws. The study was also a continuation of the work Abbott and Breckinridge earlier work examining wards of the Juvenile Court of Cook County.
