= Daniel Garber (politician) =

American politician (1875–1959)

Member of the Nebraska Legislature from the 32nd district
- In office January 3, 1939 – January 4, 1949
- Preceded by: Earl Carpenter
- Succeeded by: Carl Lindgren

Member of the Nebraska House of Representatives from the 71st district
- In office January 2, 1923 – January 6, 1925
- Preceded by: William H. Quade
- Succeeded by: Clyde Pitney

Personal details
- Born: April 3, 1875 Nelson, Nebraska
- Died: July 9, 1959 (aged 84) Lincoln, Nebraska
- Party: Republican
- Spouse: Ruth I. McCracken (m. 1915)
- Children: 5
- Relatives: Silas Garber (uncle)
- Occupation: Farmer

Daniel S. Garber (April 3, 1875 – July 9, 1959) was a Republican politician from Nebraska who served as a member of the Nebraska House of Representatives from the 71st district from 1923 to 1925 and as a member of the Nebraska Legislature from the 32nd district from 1939 to 1949.

== Early life ==
Garber was born in Nelson, Nebraska, in 1875. His father, Joseph Garber, was a delegate to the 1875 Nebraska constitutional convention, and his uncle, Silas Garber, served as the 3rd Governor of Nebraska. He grew up in Red Cloud, and attended the University of Nebraska. Garber was a farmer, and served as a delegate to the 1912 and 1916 Republican national conventions.

== Nebraska House of Representatives ==
In 1922, Garber ran for the Nebraska House of Representatives from the 71st district. State Representative Charles S. Reed vacated his seat in the legislature to serve as Assistant Attorney General, and Governor Samuel Roy McKelvie appointed William Quade to serve out the remainder of his term. Quade did not run for a full term, and Garber won the Republican primary over George Cather. Garber won the general election over Democratic nominee I. W. Edson.

Garber ran for re-election in 1924. He was challenged by Democrat Clyde Pitney. Pitney defeated Garber in the general election, winning 58 percent of the vote to Garber's 42 percent.

== Nebraska Legislature ==
In 1938, Garber ran for the Nebraska Legislature from the 32nd district, challenging incumbent State Senator Earl Carpenter for re-election. In the primary, Garber placed second in the primary, receiving 22 percent of the vote. He proceeded to the general election with Carpenter, who won 30 percent. In the general election, Garber defeated Carpenter, winning 53–47 percent.

Garber ran for re-election in 1940, and was challenged by Henry Somerhalder. Garber received 71 percent of the vote in the primary election to Somerhalder's 29 percent, and defeated Somerhalder in the general election with 64 percent of the vote.

In 1942, Garber sought a third term, and was challenged by former State Senator Murray F. Rickard. In the primary election, Garber placed first over Rickard, receiving 68 percent of the vote to his 32 percent. In the general election, Garber won re-election, defeating Rickard, 63–37 percent.

Garber ran for re-election in 1944. He was challenged by Charles Copley, and won 67 percent of the vote in the primary election. In the general election, Garber defeated Copley in a landslide, receiving 69 percent of the vote to Copley's 31 percent.

In 1946, Copley and Rickard challenged Garber. In the primary, Garber placed first, winning 54 percent of the vote. He advanced to the general election with Rickard, who placed second with 25 percent. He defeated Rickard with 54 percent of the vote in the general election.

Garber ran for re-election to a sixth term in 1948. He was challenged by Rickard, former Franklin County Commissioner Carl Lindgren, and civic activist Arabelle Hanna. The campaign was close, and on election night, Garber appeared to narrowly lose renomination. After all the votes were tallied, Garber's loss was confirmed. Hanna placed first in the primary with 36 percent of the vote, and Garber received 6 votes fewer than Lindgren.

== Death ==
Garber died on July 9, 1959.
