= Robert Wilkinson Furnas =

American politician

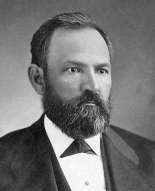

2nd Governor of Nebraska
- In office January 13, 1873 – January 11, 1875
- Preceded by: William H. James (acting)
- Succeeded by: Silas Garber

Personal details
- Born: May 5, 1824 near Troy, Ohio
- Died: June 1, 1905 (aged 81) Lincoln, Nebraska
- Party: Republican

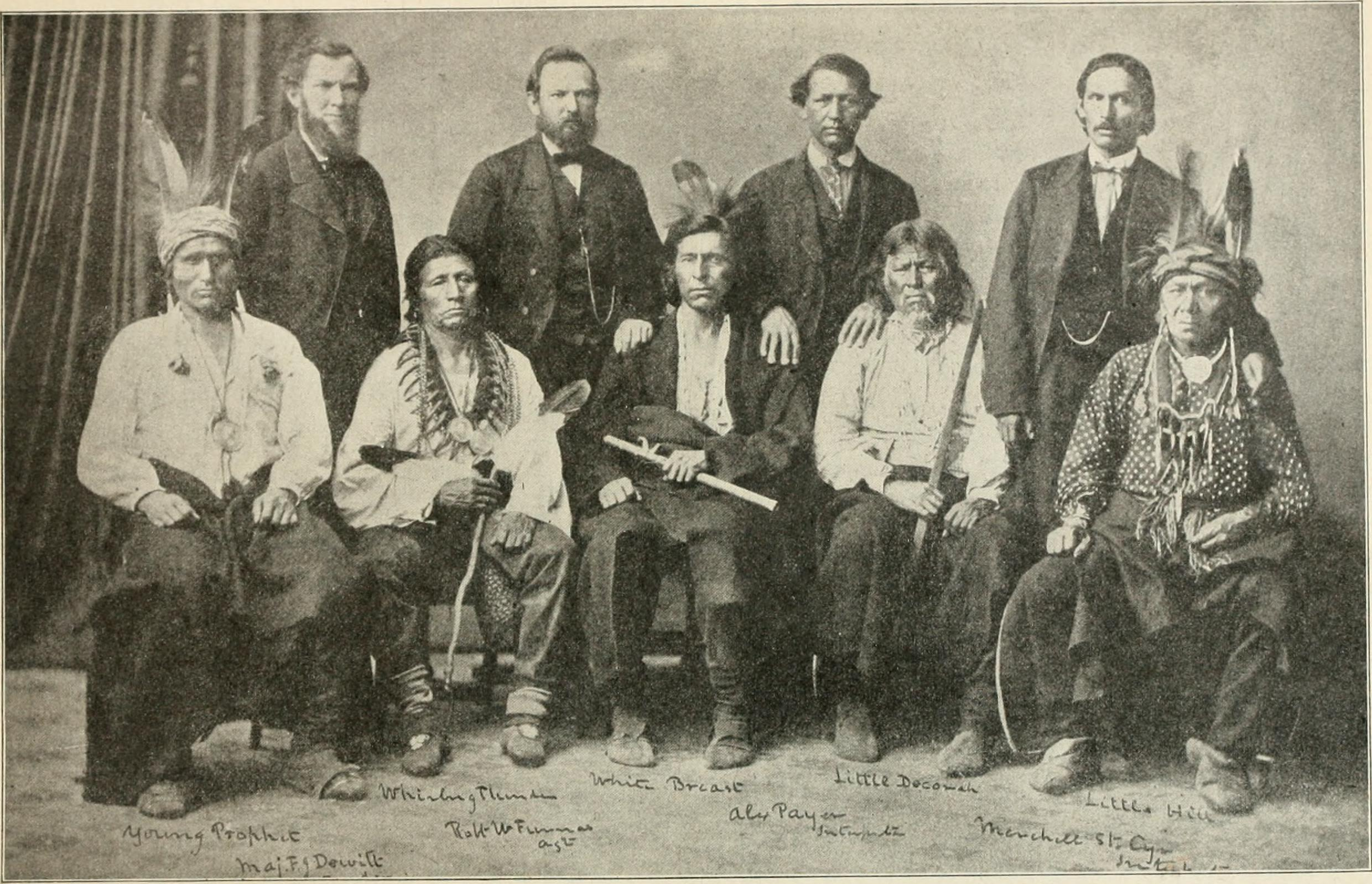
Furnas as an Indian agent, 1866

Robert Wilkinson Furnas (May 5, 1824 – June 1, 1905) was the second governor of Nebraska, United States.

== Early life ==
Born near Troy, Ohio, and orphaned at the age of eight Furnas was a self-made man. He worked as a farmer, printer, tinsmith, insurance salesman, and postmaster all before getting into politics. He married Mary Elizabeth McComas on October 29, 1845, who died in 1897. His second wife was Susannah Emswiler Jameson. He had eight children.

== Career ==
Furnas came to Nebraska in 1856 at the age of thirty-two and settled in Brownville, Nebraska. Two months later, he published the Nebraska Advertiser, a publication advertising the agricultural opportunities found in Nebraska. He also published the Nebraska Farmer, the first agricultural publication out of Nebraska that is still published to this day.

In 1856 and 1858, Furnas was elected to the Legislative Assembly of Nebraska Territory. He served as the public printer for the Nebraska Territory in 1857. In 1861, he was the chief clerk of the Territorial Council.

=== Civil War ===
During the Civil War, Furnas became a colonel in the territorial militia, which was loyal to the Union. In 1862, he commanded three Indian regiments aligned with the Union Army and captured the Cherokee Indian chief John Ross.

=== Civilian career ===
After the war, Furnas served as Indian agent for the Omaha, Winnebago, and Ponca tribes. He was a member of the University of Nebraska board of regents from 1869 to 1875, first president of the Nebraska State Historical Society from 1878 to 1890, United States commissioner to the Philadelphia Centennial Exposition, United States Commissioner to the New Orleans Cotton Centennial and United States commissioner to the Chicago Columbian Exposition.

Furnas served as president of the American Fair Association, president of the State Horticultural Society, Fourth Grand Master of Masons of Nebraska AF&AM from 1865 to 1866, first president of the Nebraska Teachers Association and president of the State Board of Agriculture. He served as secretary of the State Board of Agriculture from the early 1880s until his death.

Furnas secured the Republican nomination, and was elected governor by popular vote. He served as Governor of Nebraska from 1873 to 1875.

== Death ==
Furnas died in 1905 and is interred in Walnut Grove Cemetery in Brownville, Nebraska.

== Legacy ==
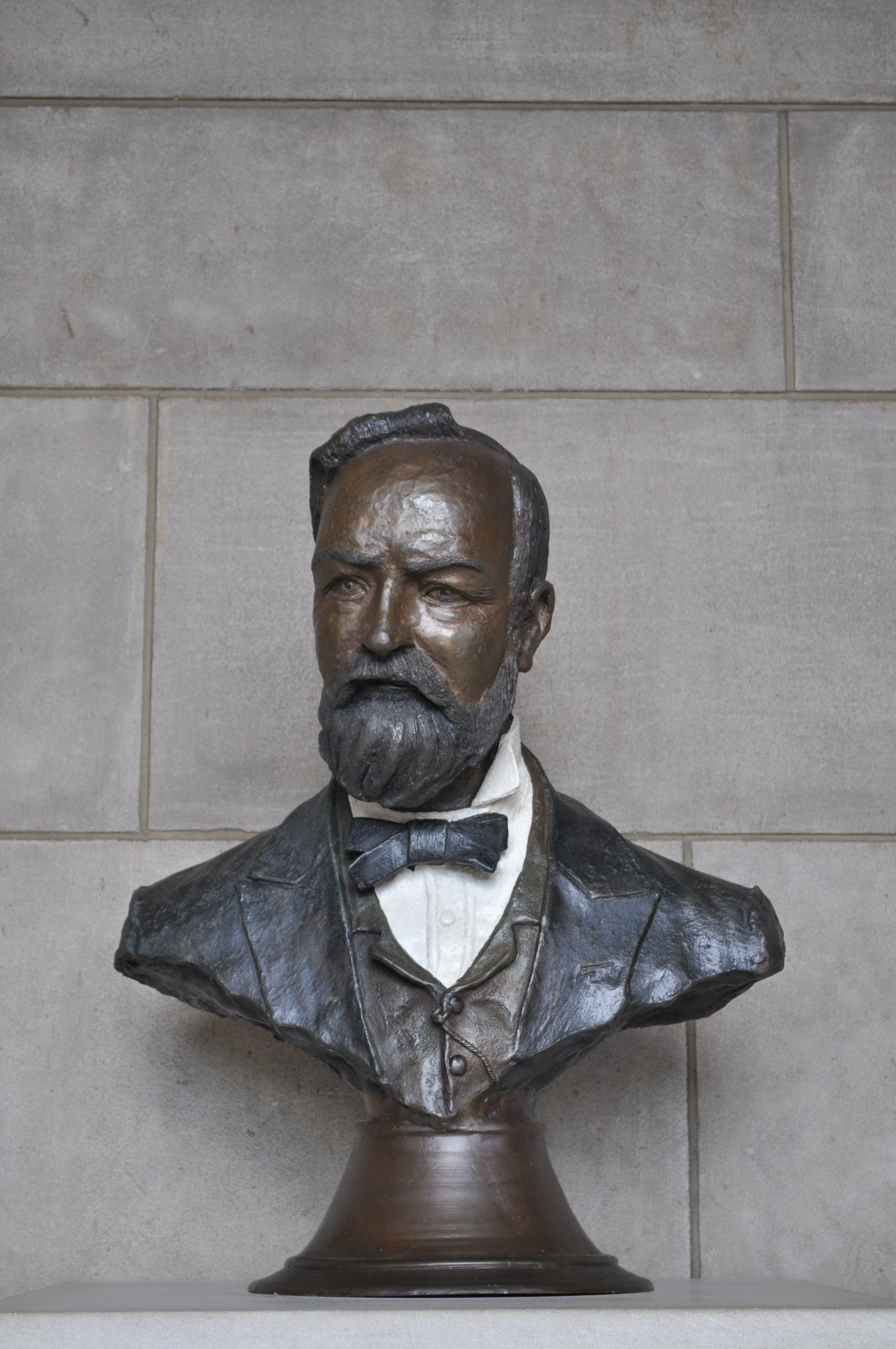
Bust of Furnas created by Tom Palmerton in 1982 for the Nebraska Hall of Fame.

Furnas helped to create Arbor Day when he was governor.

Furnas County, Nebraska, is named in his honor.

He was inducted into the Nebraska Hall of Fame in 1980.

Party political offices
Preceded by David Butler	Republican nominee for Governor of Nebraska; 1872	Succeeded by Silas Garber
Political offices
Preceded by William H. James; Acting Governor	Governor of Nebraska; 1873–1875	Succeeded by Silas Garber
