= Silas Garber =

American politician

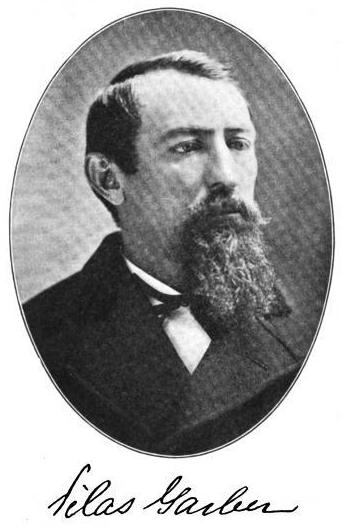

3rd Governor of Nebraska
- In office January 11, 1875 – January 9, 1879
- Lieutenant: Othman A. Abbott (1877–79)
- Preceded by: Robert Wilkinson Furnas
- Succeeded by: Albinus Nance

Member of the Nebraska House of Representatives
- In office 1872

Personal details
- Born: September 21, 1833 Logan County, Ohio
- Died: January 12, 1905 (aged 71) Red Cloud, Nebraska
- Party: Republican
- Relatives: Daniel Garber (nephew)

Silas Garber (September 21, 1833 – January 12, 1905) was the founder of Red Cloud, Nebraska and was also the third governor of Nebraska.

Garber was born in Logan County, Ohio. He moved to Clayton County, Iowa when he was seventeen and started farming. He was married to Rosella Dana, and then to Lyra C. Wheeler. His wife was the inspiration for Willa Cather's A Lost Lady; deemed "smutty for its time," this caused tension between the Garber and Cather families.

== Career ==
At the start of the Civil War, Garber joined the 3rd Missouri Regiment on October 3, 1862. He later transferred to Co. D, 27th Iowa Infantry, with a promotion to captain on April 13, 1863. He was mustered out of the Army on August 8, 1865. He left the Midwest and moved to California where he engaged in livestock trading.

Garber returned to the Midwest in 1870. He settled in Webster County, Nebraska, and in 1872, he laid out the town site of Red Cloud. Garber served as probate judge of Webster County, and in 1872 he was elected to the Nebraska House of Representatives. In 1873 he became Register of the U.S. Land Office in Lincoln. He received the Republican nomination, and in 1874, Garber became the fourth (third elected) Governor of Nebraska. He served on the University of Nebraska board of regents from 1875 to 1876. After re-election and serving out his second term, Garber returned to Red Cloud.

== Death ==
Silas Garber died in Red Cloud, Nebraska, after a long illness. He is interred at Red Cloud Cemetery, Red Cloud, Nebraska.

Party political offices
Preceded by Robert Wilkinson Furnas	Republican nominee for Governor of Nebraska; 1874, 1876	Succeeded by Albinus Nance
Political offices
Preceded by Robert Wilkinson Furnas	Governor of Nebraska; 1875 – 1879	Succeeded by Albinus Nance
