= David Butler (politician) =

American state politician (1829–1891)

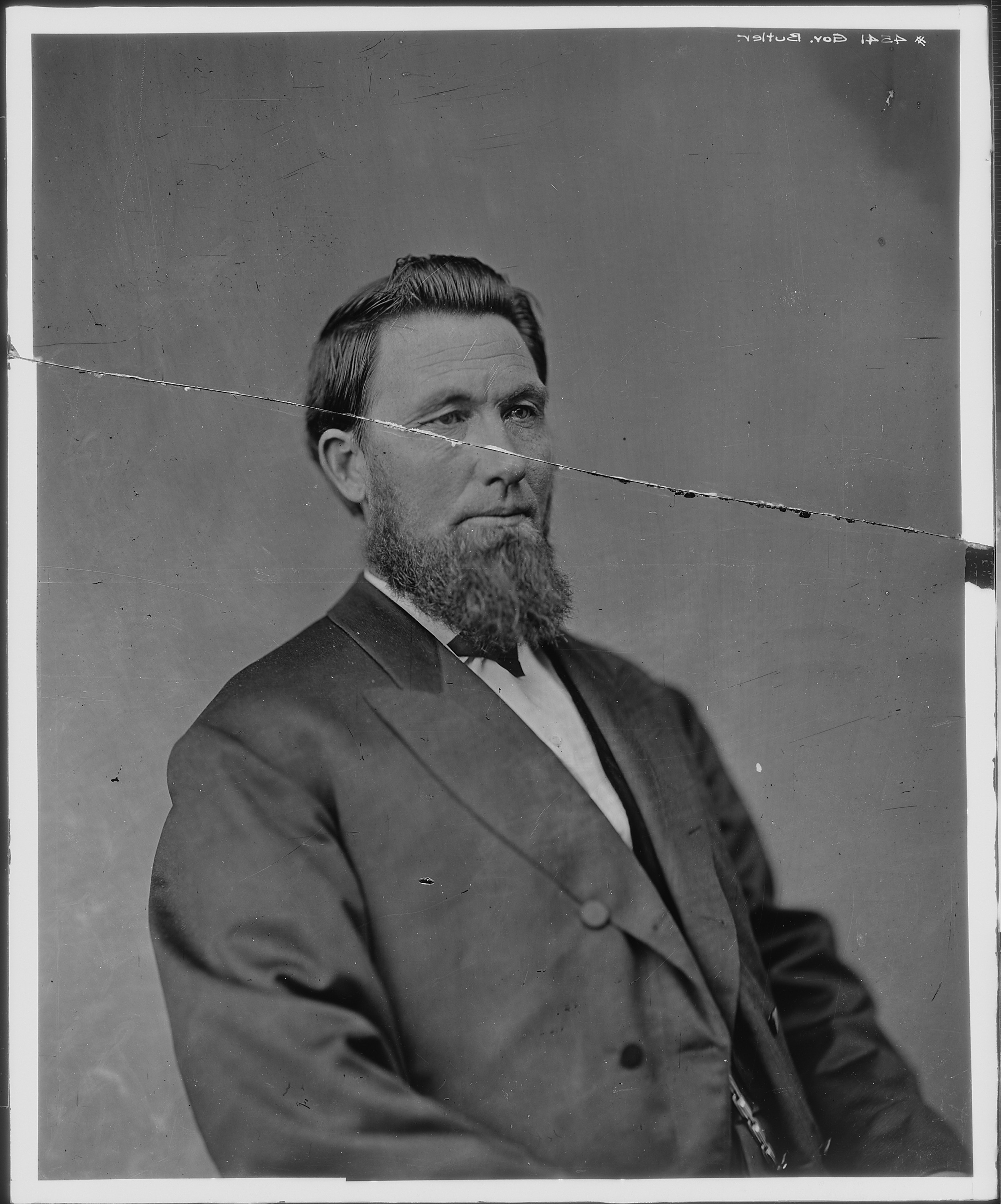
- Butler, c. 1860–1865

1st Governor of Nebraska
- In office February 21, 1867 – June 2, 1871
- Preceded by: Alvin Saunders (Nebraska Territory)
- Succeeded by: William H. James (acting)

Personal details
- Born: December 15, 1829 near Linton, Indiana, U.S.
- Died: May 25, 1891 (aged 61) Pawnee City, Nebraska, U.S.
- Party: Republican (Before 1882); Independent (1882–1888); Union Labor (1888–1891)
- Spouse(s): Mary Smith; Lydia Story
- Children: 8

David Christy Butler (December 15, 1829 – May 25, 1891) was a U.S. political figure. He was the first governor of Nebraska, serving from 1867 until 1871. He was the first governor of Nebraska after statehood and the only Nebraska governor to be impeached.

== Biography ==
Butler was born near Linton, Indiana, the eldest son of 10 children. His education was limited to the common schools and he worked at farming and cattle trading. He married twice. His first wife was Mary Pauline Smith Butler and his second was Lydia Story Butler. He and Lydia were married on January 25, 1860, and he had eight children.

== Career ==
Butler was nominated for a state senate seat in Indiana in 1856, but withdrew before the election. He moved three years later to Pawnee City, Nebraska, and engaged in trading cattle until his election to the Nebraska Territorial Legislature in 1861. He was elected to the Nebraska State Senate in 1863 and won the 1866 election to become Nebraska's first governor. During his second term (1869–1870), Butler moved the state's capital from Omaha to present-day Lincoln.

In the spring of 1871, soon after taking office for his third term, eleven articles of impeachment were brought against him. The first charged him with misuse of some $16,000 from the state school fund. Butler had allegedly made personal use of this money to purchase lots in the new city of Lincoln. He was suspended from office by the Supreme Court and subsequently tried by the State Senate. In his impeachment trial, he was convicted on the first charge, although the remaining ten were dropped. The Supreme Court then removed him from office on June 2, 1871.

In 1877, the Legislature reviewed its action and adopted a resolution expunging the impeachment proceedings from the record. After ten years of retirement from public life, Butler was elected to the Nebraska State Senate on the Independent Ticket in 1882. Running on the Union Labor Ticket in 1888, he again sought the Governorship but was defeated.

== Death and legacy ==
Following this defeat Butler retired to his home in Pawnee City, where he died on May 25, 1891, and is interred at Pawnee City Cemetery. Butler County in eastern Nebraska may have been named for him, but this is disputed, since records seem to indicate that the county was being referred to as "Butler County" before David Butler had served as Governor of Nebraska. Butler also may be the namesake of David City, Nebraska, but this is also disputed.

Party political offices
First	Republican nominee for Governor of Nebraska; 1866, 1868, 1870	Succeeded by Robert Wilkinson Furnas
Political offices
Preceded by Alvin Saunders as Governor of Nebraska Territory	Governor of Nebraska; 1867–1871	Succeeded by William H. James; Acting
