= Jesús Torres =

Jesús Torres may refer to:

- Jesus David Torres (born 1984), known professionally as Dahvie Vanity, American singer
- Jesús Torres (footballer) (born 1980), Spanish footballer
- Jesús Torres (cyclist) (born 1954), Venezuelan cyclist
- Jesús Hurtado Torres (born 1965), Mexican politician
- Jesús Torres (artist) (1898-1948), Mexican-American artist and sculptor
