= Dr. Philip Weintraub House =

Dr. Philip Weintraub house
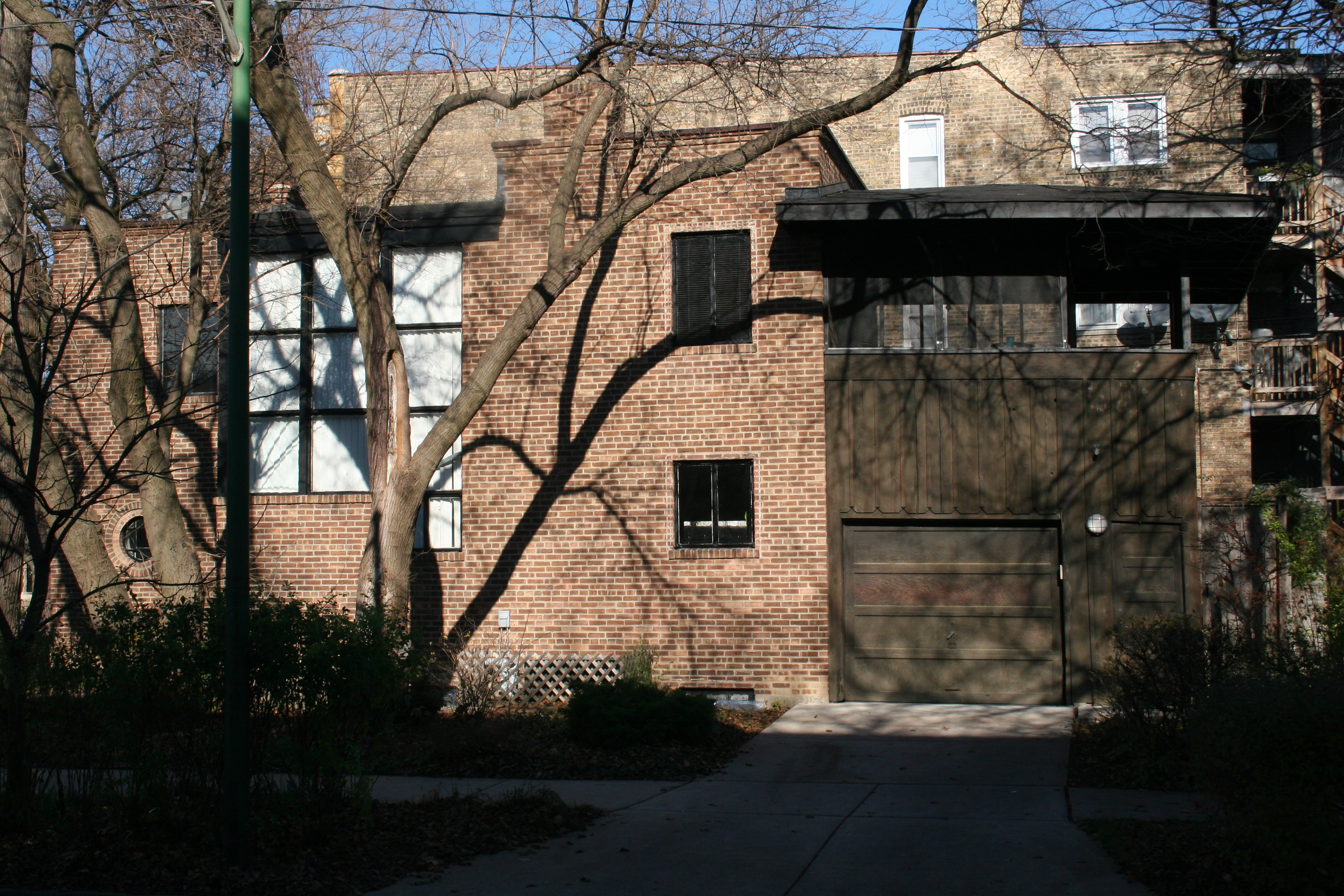
- Dr. Philip Weintraub house
- Interactive map of the Dr. Philip Weintraub house area

General information
- Architectural style: Streamline Moderne
- Location: 3252 W. Victoria Street, Chicago, Illinois
- Coordinates: 41.6912°N 87.6827°W
- Completed: 1940

Design and construction
- Architect: Andrew Rebori

Chicago Landmark
- Designated: November 18, 2009

The Dr. Philip Weintraub House is an early modern single-family house in the Hollywood Park neighborhood of Chicago, Illinois. Located at 3252 W. Victoria Street, the home was built in 1940 by architect Andrew Nicholas Rebori (1886–1966) and artist Edgar Miller (1899–1993) for Philip Weintraub.

The house is built in the International Style with an asymmetric shape, smooth, undecorated siding, and flat roofs with a rooftop terrace. Inside there are elements of Art Moderne, including rounded edges on walls and the fireplace, recessed cove lighting, built-in cabinets, a glass-block wall in the bathroom, and a round window by the front entrance. Miller designed three art pieces for the interior: a low-relief sculpture of a woman over the fireplace, a recessed decorative tile of a woman on a beach, and a metal door-pull on a built-in hallway cabinet. These objects were still in the house in 2009, when it was declared a Chicago Landmark.

The house was chosen as a Chicago landmark for three reasons. First, it is an important part of the city's history as an example of a middle-class house designed in early pre-World War II modernism. Second, it is important architecture in that it combines elements of international style and art moderne in a pre-World War II house, with artwork by an important Chicago artist. Third, the house represents the innovations in modern design of an important Chicago architect.

Rebori designed many other significant Chicago buildings, and Rebori collaborated with Miller on others. The Madonna della Strada Chapel at Loyola University and the Fischer Studio Houses are both examples of buildings the two worked on together.

This house was the site of a Chicago "Fight or Walk" protest of Chicago Transit Authority rate hikes on April 9, 2005, when the home was the property of Frank Kruesi, then president of the Chicago CTA.
