= Andrew Rebori =

American architect

- Born: February 21, 1886; New York City, United States
- Died: May 31, 1966 (aged 80); Chicago, Illinois
- Education: M.I.T.
- Occupation: Architect
- Practice: Rebori, Wentworth, Dewey and McCormick
- Buildings: Fisher Studio Houses, Chicago

Andrew Nicholas Rebori (February 21, 1886 – May 31, 1966) was an American architect who was a member of the Chicago school of architecture.

== Life and work ==
=== Early life ===
Born in New York City, Rebori was the son of an engineer who had immigrated to the U.S. from Italy. Rebori was friends during his childhood with future presidential nominee Al Smith. At age 15, Rebori began working in the office of New York architect Charles Alling Gifford making blueprints, and he also worked for architect Herbert D. Hale. Rebori finished evening high school at age 18. Later in Rebori's teen years, he studied under New York architect Henry Hornbostel.

From 1905 until 1907, Rebori attended Massachusetts Institute of Technology, where he met his future wife, Nannie Prendergast of Wheaton, Illinois, whose farm adjoined that of the parents of Chicago Tribune publisher Robert R. McCormick. Rebori and Prendergast married in 1913. From 1908 until 1909, Rebori studied in the Ecole des Beaux Arts, subsequently working for the neo-classical architect Cass Gilbert in New York. Rebori earned a bachelor's degree from the Armour Institute of Technology in 1911.

=== Career and family ===
In 1909, Rebori moved to Chicago as a professor of architecture at the Armour Institute. The following year, he met famed architect Louis Sullivan, who became a mentor to Rebori. Rebori worked in the office of architect Jarvis Hunt from 1914 until 1922, after which point he founded his own firm, Rebori, Wentworth, Dewey and McCormick. Rebori's firm eventually dissolved in 1932, and he worked in private practice by himself until 1940. He performed various wartime projects from 1941 until 1944, and then worked as a consulting architect for DeLeuw, Cather & Co. from 1944 until 1955. Rebori also worked in private practice from 1952 until 1961, when he retired.

Rebori had little use for most modern style buildings, which he once referred to as "steel and glass upside-down cakes." However, Rebori at the same time was known for his own pre-World War II modernist style, which was best seen in his Fisher Studio Houses development which he developed with designer/artist Edgar Miller. And he was well known for being willing to tailor his work to a client's request, making him more of an eclectic architect than anything else. "The architect is no longer an individualist, he is a follower," Rebori told the Chicago Tribune . "Today's architects just want to please their patrons." (December 22, 1963)

Rebori had two children. His son, Andrew P. Rebori (1916–1952), an army aviator during World War II, died of polio on September 15, 1952. Rebori's daughter, Naneen (sometimes shown as being spelled Nanneen) Rebori Donaldson (1914–1996), died on June 15, 1996. Rebori's wife, Nannie, died on May 16, 1917 in Chicago and, after her funeral in Winfield, Illinois near their summer home, she was buried in Calvary Cemetery, Illinois.

Rebori died at his home at 6 E. Scott Street in Chicago on May 31, 1966. He is buried in Graceland Cemetery in Chicago.

== Projects ==
- Roanoke Building, 11 S. LaSalle Street in Chicago, 1915-1925 (with Holabird & Roche)
- House at 220 Birch Street in Winnetka, Illinois, 1920
- Chicago Riding Club / CBS Studios, 630 N. McClurg Ct. in Chicago, 1922
- Racquet Club of Chicago, 1365 N. Dearborn Street in Chicago, 1923
- Fine Arts building annex, 421 S. Wabash Avenue in Chicago, 1924
- Residence of Wayne Chatfield-Taylor, 620 Lake Road, Lake Forest, Illinois, 1925
- Elizabeth Arden building, 70 E. Walton Place in Chicago, 1926
- 2430 N. Lakeview Avenue co-op building, 1927
- Sterling building at 737 N. Michigan Avenue in Chicago (demolished 1974)
- Madonna Della Strada Chapel at Loyola University Chicago, 1929
- 1325 N. Astor Street co-op building, 1929
- Cudahy Memorial Library at Loyola University Chicago, 1930
- LaSalle-Wacker Building, 221 N. LaSalle Street in Chicago, 1930 (with Holabird & Roche)
- Post office at Wheaton, Illinois, 1932
- House at the 1933 Homes of Tomorrow Exhibition, 1933
- Fisher Studio Houses, 1209 N. State Street in Chicago, 1936
- Dr. Philip Weintraub House, 3252 W. Victoria Street in Chicago, 1940
- Administration building and barracks, Glenview Naval Air Station (consulting architect), 1940s
- Burial memorial for Robert R. McCormick at Cantigny in Wheaton, Illinois, dedicated 1957
- 1st Infantry Division museum at Cantigny in Wheaton, Illinois, dedicated 1960
