= Madonna Della Strada =

Painting of Mary at the Church of the Gesù in Rome, Italy

Madonna della Strada
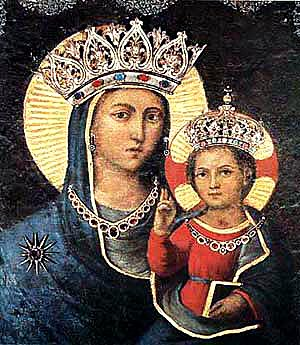
- The fresco wearing its Canonical crown which was used for the canonical coronation in 1638
- Location: Italian Rome in the 13th-14th century
- Date: 24 May
- Shrine: Church of the Gesù
- Patronage: Society of Jesus

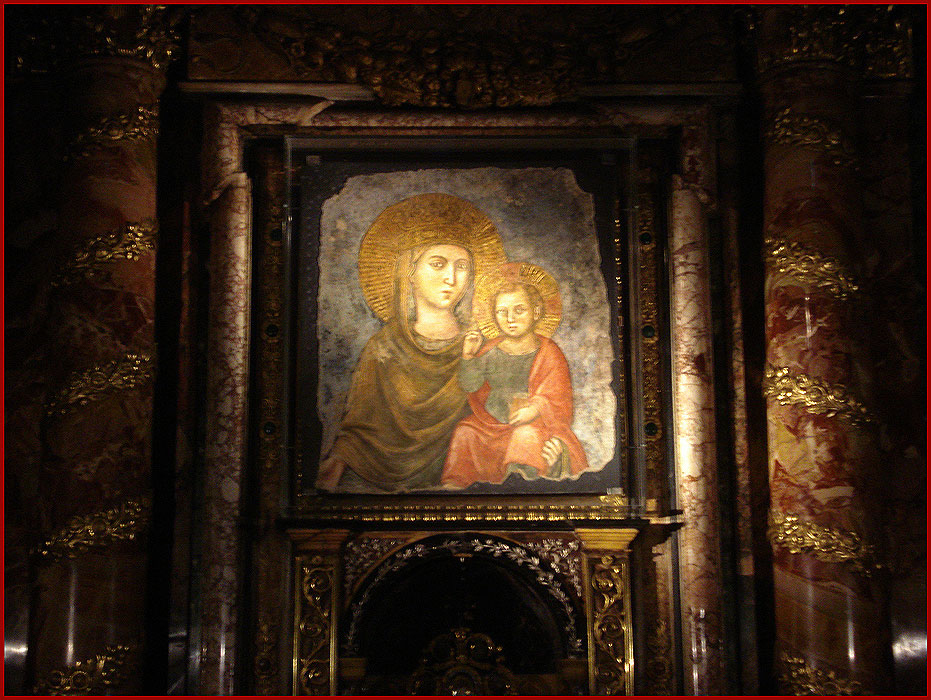
The Madonna della Strada

Madonna della Strada or Santa Maria della Strada (English: Our Lady of the Wayside or Saint Mary of the Good Road) is a painting of Mary, mother of Jesus at the Church of the Gesù in Rome, mother church of the Society of Jesus (Jesuits) religious order of the Catholic Church; it is a variation on the basilissa (imperial) type of icon.

The Madonna della Strada is the patroness saint of the Society of Jesus. The society's founder, St. Ignatius of Loyola, was said to have been protected by the intercession of Mary during battle in his service as a soldier.

== History ==
The name goes back to a shrine established in Rome in the 5th century by the Astalli family, originally known as the Madonna degli Astalli, at a crossroads along the ceremonial route of the popes. The 13th-14th century fresco (a wall painting done on damp plaster) was originally painted on the wall of Saint Mary of the Way in Rome, the church of the Society of Jesus (Jesuits), given to Saint Ignatius by Pope Paul III in 1540.

In 1568, Cardinal Alessandro Farnese erected the Gesù Church of Rome, the mother church of the Jesuits, in place of the former church of Santa Maria della Strada. The fresco was moved there in 1575 to a side chapel where Jesuits pronounced their vows. Sometime in the 19th century, the image was transferred to canvas and affixed to a slate panel.

Pope Urban VIII granted a decree of Canonical Coronation towards the image. The coronation took place on August 15, 1638.

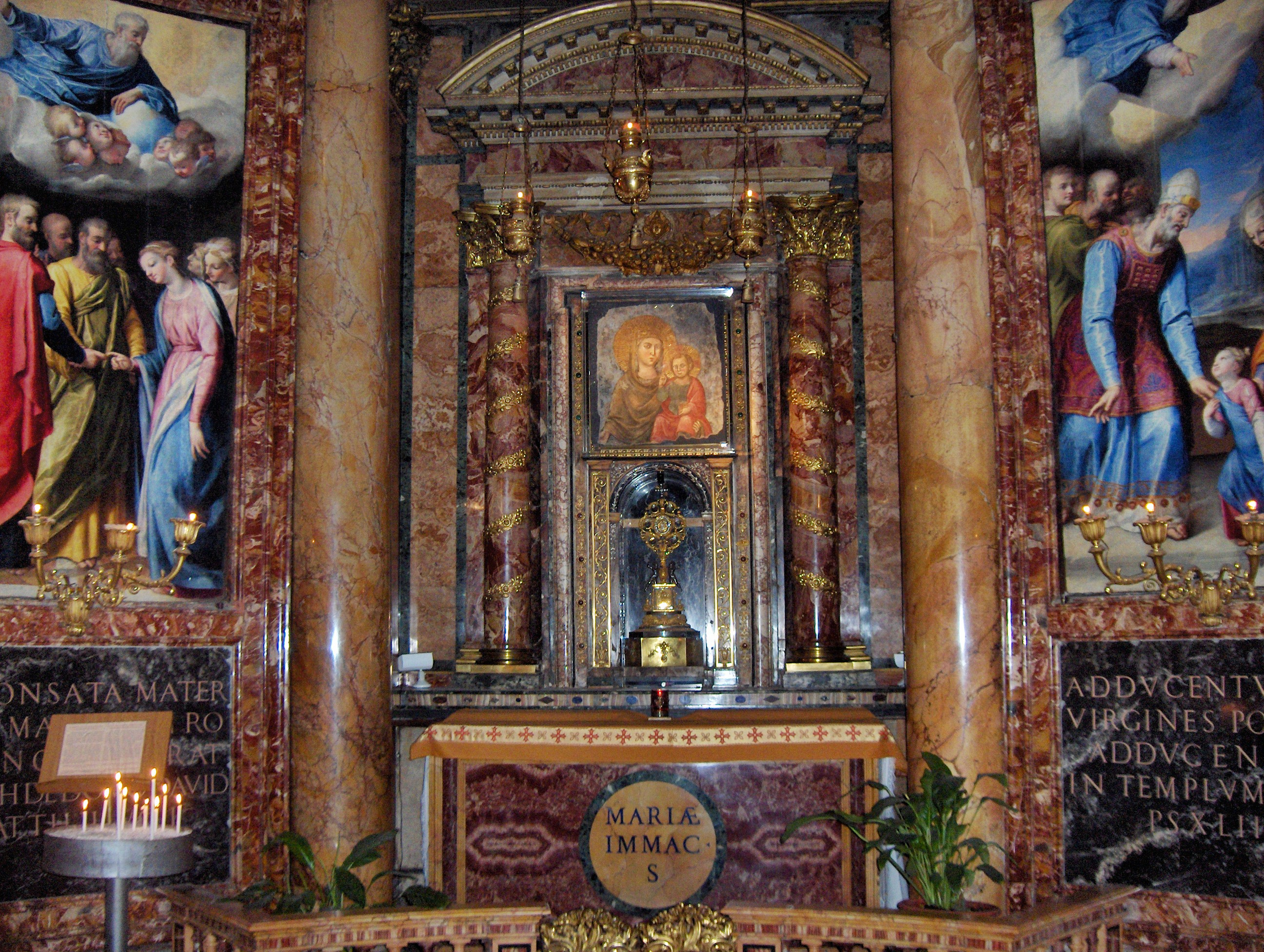
Altar of Madonna Della Strada

The icon is located between two altars, the first dedicated to Ignatius of Loyola, the second, the main altar of the Church, dedicated to the Holy Name of Jesus.

The icon was restored in 2006, revealing at least two layers of previous paint, the original art being a fresco which had been detached from a wall and affixed to canvas.

== Legacy ==
There is a Madonna della Strada Chapel at Loyola University in Chicago, Illinois, at the University of Scranton in Scranton, Pennsylvania, at Regis University in Denver, Colorado, another at Zilber Hall, Marquette University in Milwaukee, Wisconsin and

== See also ==
- Roman Catholic Marian art
- Patronage of the Blessed Virgin Mary
- List of Jesuit sites
