= Carl Street Studios =

Apartment complex in Chicago, Illinois

Coordinates: 41°54′50.1″N 87°38′6.2″W

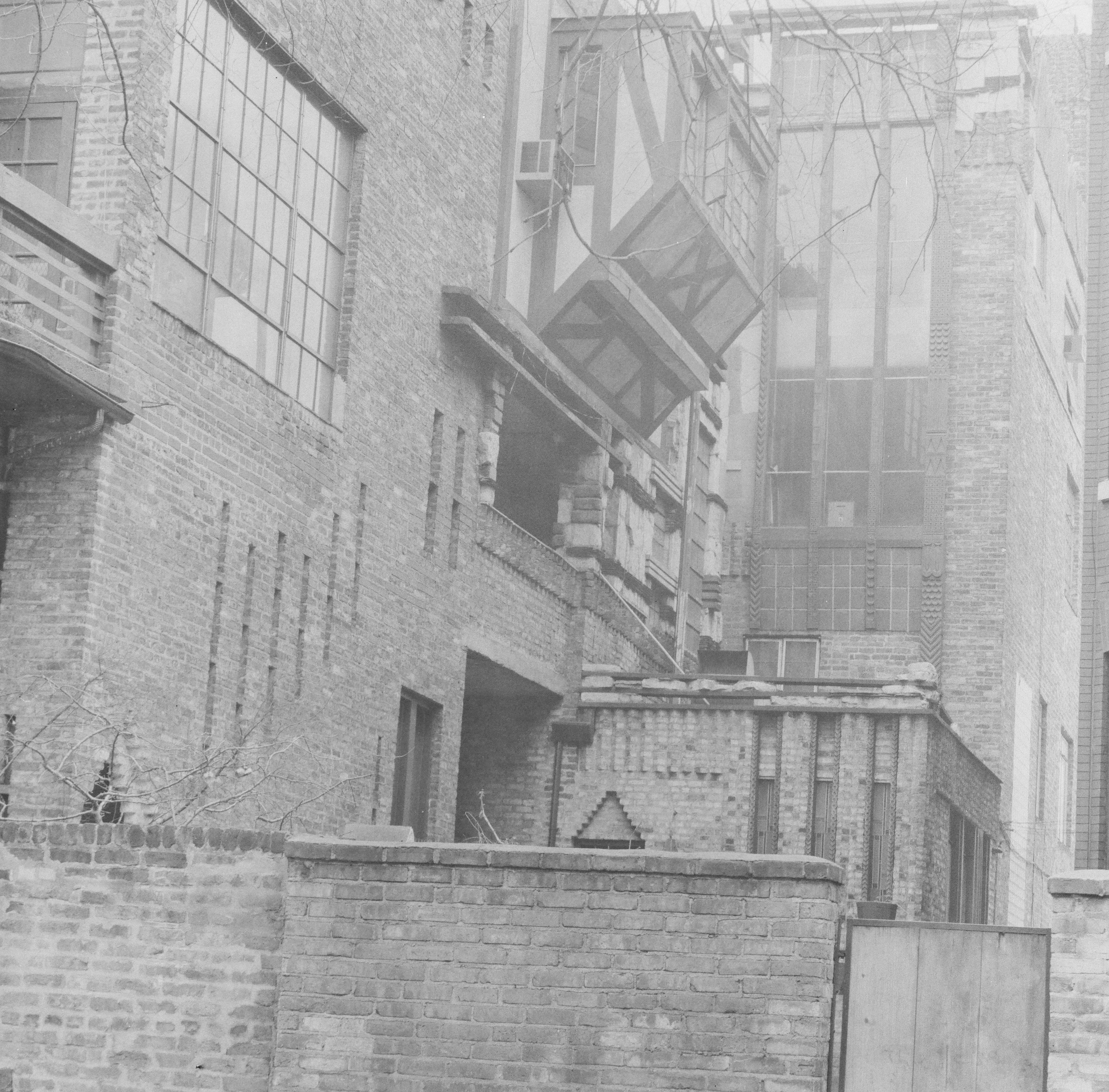
the building circa 1969

The front of the building

The Carl Street Studios is an enclave in Chicago's Old Town neighborhood.

== Early years ==
The Carl Street Studios complex began its life as a single family three story mansion built during the 1880s, and was, during part of these early years, reputedly owned by a mayor of the city of Chicago. During the 1880s through the 1910s, the surrounding neighborhood was a fashionable district for Chicago's upper middle class. The original structure, located on what was then Carl Street, was quite typical of the Victorian mansions that were built during the period, and its style is fairly reflected by many of the brownstone and greystone mansions that still dot the west side of LaSalle Street between Division Street and North Avenue.

During the 1910s and 1920s the socio-economic status of the surrounding area changed, with German, Bohemian and eastern European immigrants constituting the primary ethnic makeup of the new resident pool. Many of the Victorian mansions in the area, including those located on Carl Street, were converted into multi-family dwellings and some fell into disrepair. The value of real estate in the neighborhood suffered a corresponding decline.

== Sol Kogen & Edgar Miller ==
Shortly after World War I, a clique of enterprising and innovative artists enrolled at the School of the Art Institute of Chicago. Two such art students, Sol Kogen and Edgar Miller, met at the school and became friends and leaders of an avant-garde group of art students. Sol Kogen's parents were merchants from Chicago. A bon vivant throughout his lifetime, Sol entered the family business shortly after his experience at the Art Institute, and did well enough to "retire" from the business in the mid-1920s, travel to Europe for a number of years and pursue more independent and artistic endeavors.

In about 1927, Sol Kogen, having spent some years in Paris, and in particular the artistic Montmartre neighborhood of that city, conceived of a plan to develop an artist studio in Chicago where independent-leaning Midwestern artists could work. Sol Kogen sought an environment in which modern art could be encouraged and flourish in Chicago.

To assist him in this enterprise, Kogen called upon his former fellow student and friend, Edgar Miller, whose earliest work at the School of the Art Institute showed a clear inclination toward modernism, and who won the institute's prestigious Logan medal for his innovative work on a stained glass panel that is still displayed in the Art Institute's permanent collection. While little known today, Edgar Miller was one of the most well-known Chicago artists of his time and contributed mightily to the Chicago community's modern art movement of the 1920s, 1930s, and 1940s. Initially, Miller opened a small art gallery on Pearson Street, quaintly referred to as the "House at the End of the Street," where he exhibited his own diverse opus of work, as well as the work of other modern artists, including Lionel Feininger, Rudolph Weisenborn, John Storrs, and John W. Norton.

Edgar Miller's artistic venue was as diverse as any artists' in the world. He excelled at oil painting, watercolor, pastels, mural painting, plaster relief, sculpture, iron, steel and copper work, ceramics, textiles, mosaics, printmaking, wood carving, and stained glass. During his most productive period, Edgar was contracted to create extensive murals for the Tavern and Standard Clubs in Chicago, stained glass, sculpture and relief work for many commercial, government, educational and religious buildings throughout the Chicago area, New York and in other cities, and design work for restaurants and individual residences.

== Purchasing the mansion and renovation ==
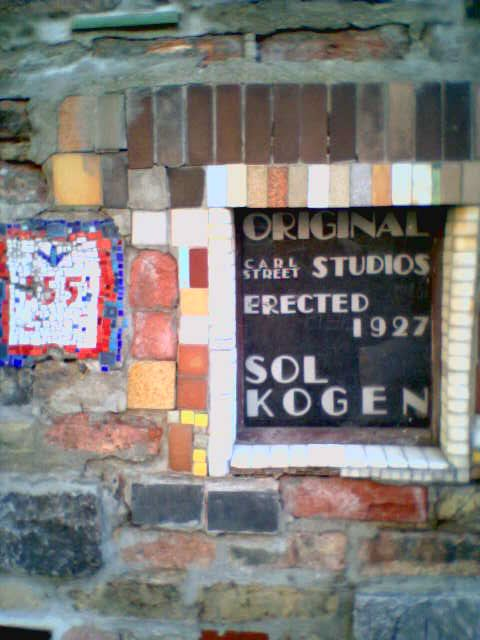
A plaque about Carl Street on the Studio itself

In 1927, Kogen purchased the mansion at 155 West Carl Street, which stood on two city lots, and asked Miller to help convert the structure into an aesthetically enticing, modern studio complex for emerging artists. From the outset, the central idea behind Carl Street Studios was to create a series of unique art studio apartments that would open out to closed communal exterior spaces fraught with gardens, fountains, koi fish ponds and, of course, art. A somewhat similar concept had already been established at the Tree Studios, located further south on State Street, earlier in the 20th century. However, unlike the Tree Studios complex, Kogen and Miller conceived of a studio complex whose interior and exterior spaces would themselves be innovative works of art, and not merely functional spaces for the production of art.

To help build the complex, Kogen and Miller recruited some of their former colleagues from the Art Institute and other like-minded emerging Chicago artists, including John W. Norton, Edgar Britton, Edward Millman, Stewart Rae and a highly talented and versatile Mexican immigrant, Jesus Torres. In exchange for their respective contributions, these artists would be permitted to reside free-of-charge in the studios as work progressed.

Work began in 1927, when the crew of artists gutted the three-story mansion, including the basement. Edgar Miller is credited with creating the interior space plan for all of the studio units in the former mansion, which included using basement spaces as primary living areas, a novel concept at the time, and featuring duplex architectural configurations, which provided for lofted bedroom and art studio spaces above. While functional, kitchens and bathrooms were not a priority. The exterior walls of the mansion were masked with a new face of common brick and featured artistic textural elements and designs.

Miller and his fellow artists met the challenge of maximizing light in each studio while maintaining privacy. In some units, soaring windows of stained, painted and/or obscure glass, painstakingly rendered by Miller, were installed. The building also pioneered the extensive use of block and molded, textured glass for primary living space windows. Interior walls (composed mainly of plaster), fireplaces and floors were aesthetically enhanced with painted murals, plaster reliefs, and hand-carved patterned wood elements. One of the most distinctive features of the apartments is the extensive and highly innovative use of a myriad of colored marbles, terrazzo, and Rookwood, Teco, Grueby and Batchelder tiles on all manner of surfaces. Decorative copper, iron and steel work abound, and creative lighting (for the time) added allure and intrigue to the studios. The exterior door of each unit enjoys its own distinctive personality (many with intricate hand carved elements by Edgar Miller and Jesus Torres), and contributes to the asymmetrical flavor of the building.

Much of the high-grade materials used in the building were reclaimed by the artists from demolished mansions in the area, demolished buildings from the 1933-34 Century of Progress International Exposition (in which many of the artists contributed), and, later during the depression, the Maxwell Street market vendors. After work on the studios in the mansion was completed, the artists erected additional four-story buildings lining the periphery of the property that essentially created the enveloped east courtyard that you see today. Artistic flourishes, such as interesting brick and tile work, mosaics, plaster and ceramic reliefs and wood carvings, mainly by Edgar Miller and Jesus Torres, enhanced the aesthetic impression of these newer structures, which contained additional artist studios with equally fanciful and dramatic interior spaces. Committed to the artistic gestalt of the complex, Miller and his crew of artists at an early date replaced the sidewalk in front of the building with a dramatic walkway of colorful and diverse tiles and marbles which informs the visitor or casual passerby that Carl Street Studios is a unique phenomenon to Chicago, and also gives a glimpse of what mysteries lie behind the front wall of the complex.

== The Depression ==
As a result of the stock market crash of 1929, Sol Kogen's financial position was severely impacted. Consequently, during the depression, Kogen relied more and more on Carl Street Studios as a means of revenue. The "art for art sake" spirit of the complex diminished somewhat, and Kogen apparently began demanding that the studio spaces be made smaller in order to increase the number of paying tenants. A rift thus developed between the art-inspired Miller and the cashed strapped Kogen and by 1936, Miller ceased work on the project altogether. It must also be said that, by this time, Miller's work was in high demand commercially, and it is unlikely that he was contributing much to the complex anyway. With Edgar Miller's departure, most of the ongoing art work in the studio complex was completed by the versatile Jesus Torres, who had been Miller's primary apprentice. During the ensuing decades, generations of artisans and craftsmen (and craftswomen) have worked on the exteriors and interiors of the studio complex.

== The 1950s ==
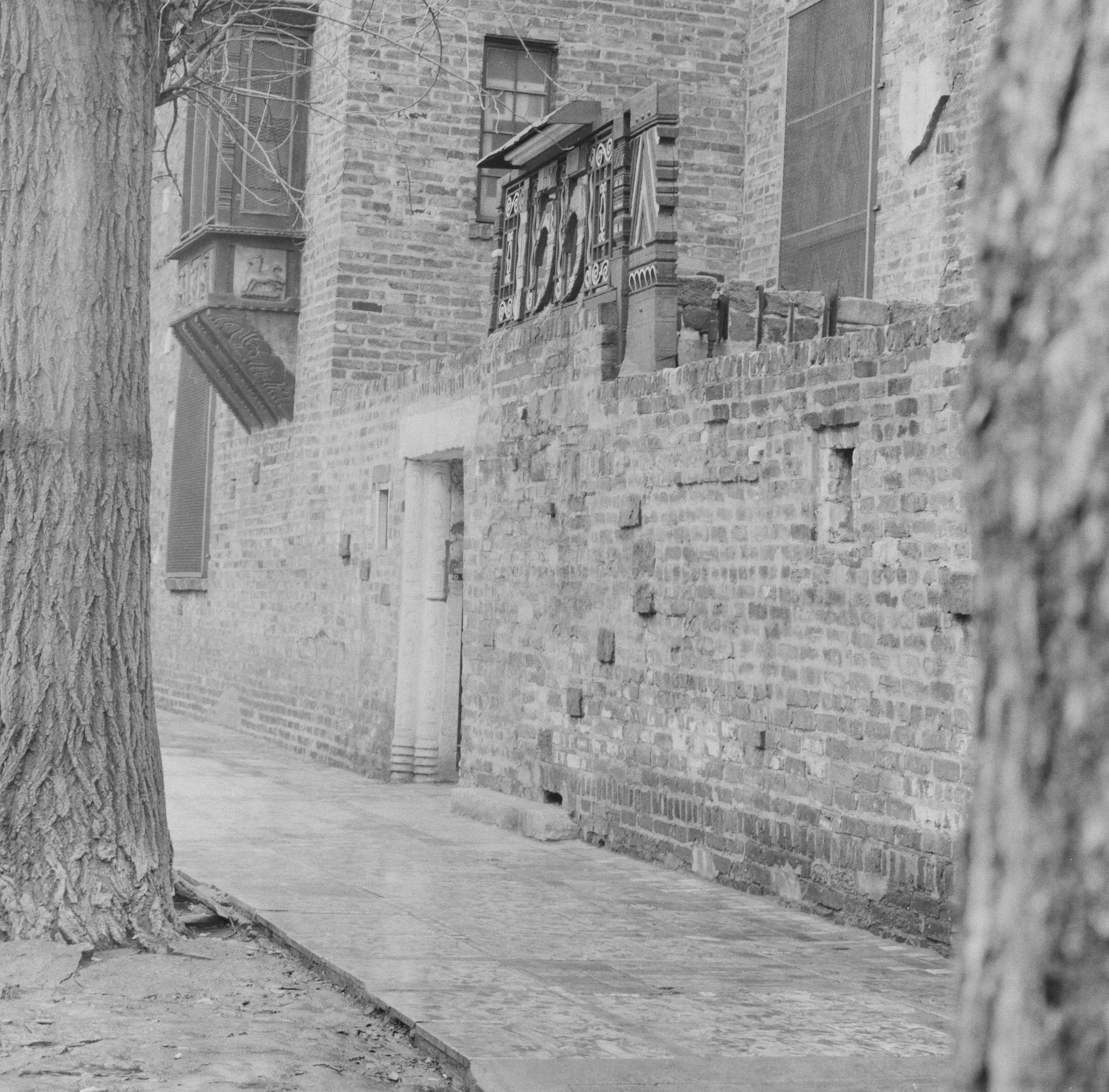
The entrance circa 1969

In the late 1950s Sol Kogen died, and the apartment complex was run first by Sol's wife and upon her death, Sol's daughter. In 1985, Sol's daughter sold the building to a Chicago entrepreneur, who located Edgar Miller in California and invited the artist back to the complex to continue work. Miller relished the opportunity to leave retirement and complete the project he planned almost sixty years before. From this time until the early 1990s, Edgar Miller lived in the complex and executed stained glass work, murals, and other art pieces for the building. Many of the studios were further enhanced by these later works by Miller, who eventually died in Chicago in 1993 at the age of 94.

A view into the courtyard through The Gate Portal

Gardens have always been an important and integral element at Carl Street Studios. From the beginning of the art studio project, peripheral flower and tree beds were formed in the east and west courtyards of the structure. Both courtyards also feature ponds where many generations of koi and goldfish have led charmed lives, while delighting residents and visitors alike. In fact, Carl Street Studios and their gardens have always been a place of revelry for residents and their guests. During the early years, the artist residents and folks from the surrounding neighborhood would gather in the east courtyard for goat roasts and annual New Years parties. The midlevel and roof gardens have also existed from an early date and have provided residents with a forum for warm summer evening get-togethers and dinners. Carl Street Studios has traditionally welcomed the public to enjoy its magical spaces, artwork and gardens during the annual Dearborn Garden Walk.

From the outset, Carl Street Studios served as the guiding spirit and anchor of the Old Town community as an artistic enclave in Chicago. Shortly after work began on the building, other artistically inclined individuals and groups, often with the assistance of Kogen, Miller and their band of artists, began remodeling other buildings on Carl Street (which was renamed Burton Place during the mid-1930s) to render an amorphous and ad hoc modern character to the street. This led still others to build or remodel buildings in a similar vein on other streets in the neighborhood, including Schiller and Wells streets. In addition to the artists already identified that have resided at Carl Street Studios, others include the world-famous artists Boris Anisfeld and Mark Tobey, and television pioneer entertainer David Garroway. Hollywood starlets, such as Tallulah Bankhead, and more recently Virginia Madsen, were also residents or frequent guests.

During the early years, Sol Kogen and Edgar Miller presented public art exhibitions within the complex, displaying the works of some of Chicago's better known modern and avant-garde artists. Since 1930, Carl Street Studios has been the subject of numerous newspaper and magazine articles, scholarly publications and public lectures. Its eclectic design and whimsical spaces have never become stale and they continue to ensure to residents and visitors alike a surprise around every corner.

== Gallery ==
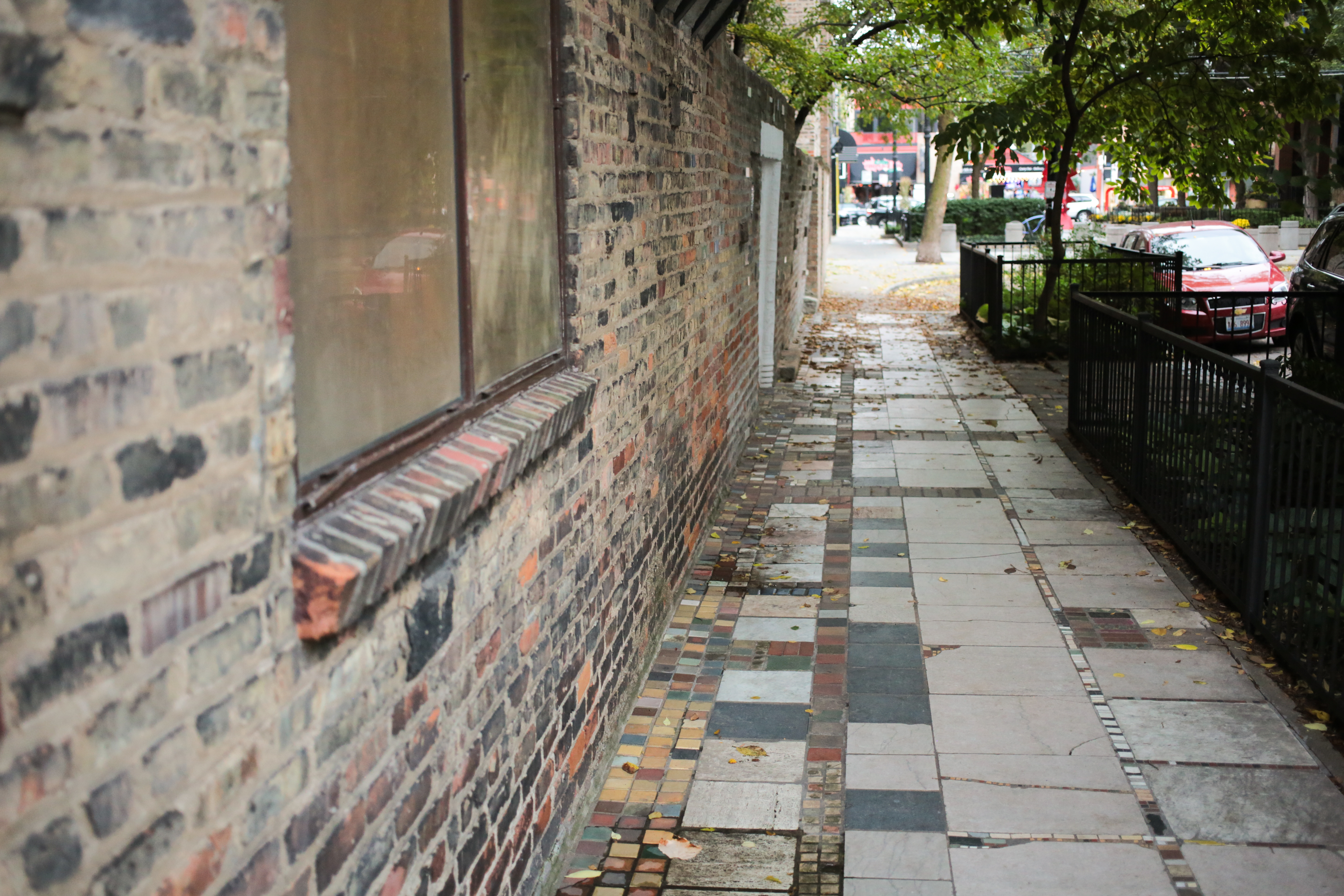
Sidewalk

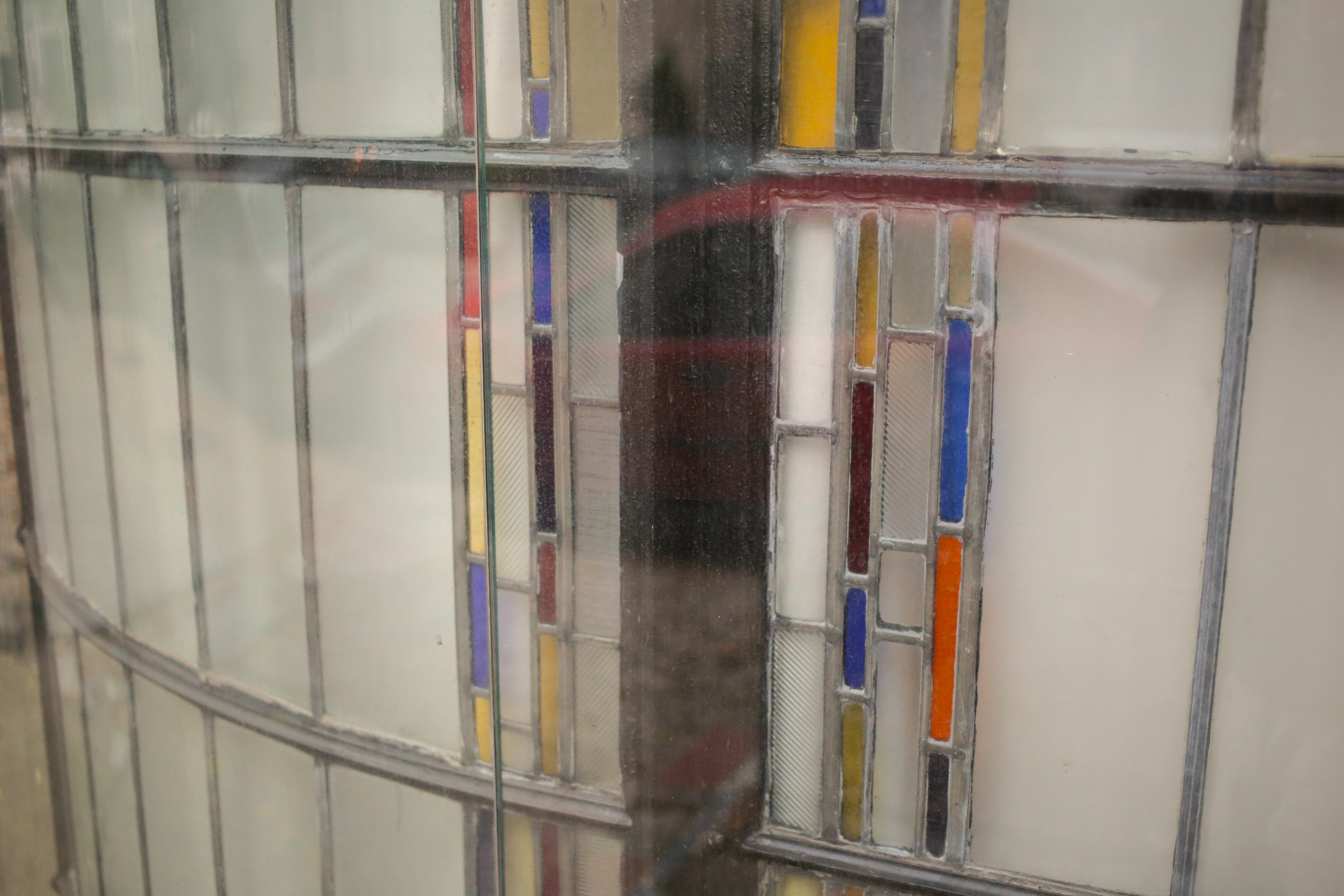
Window detail

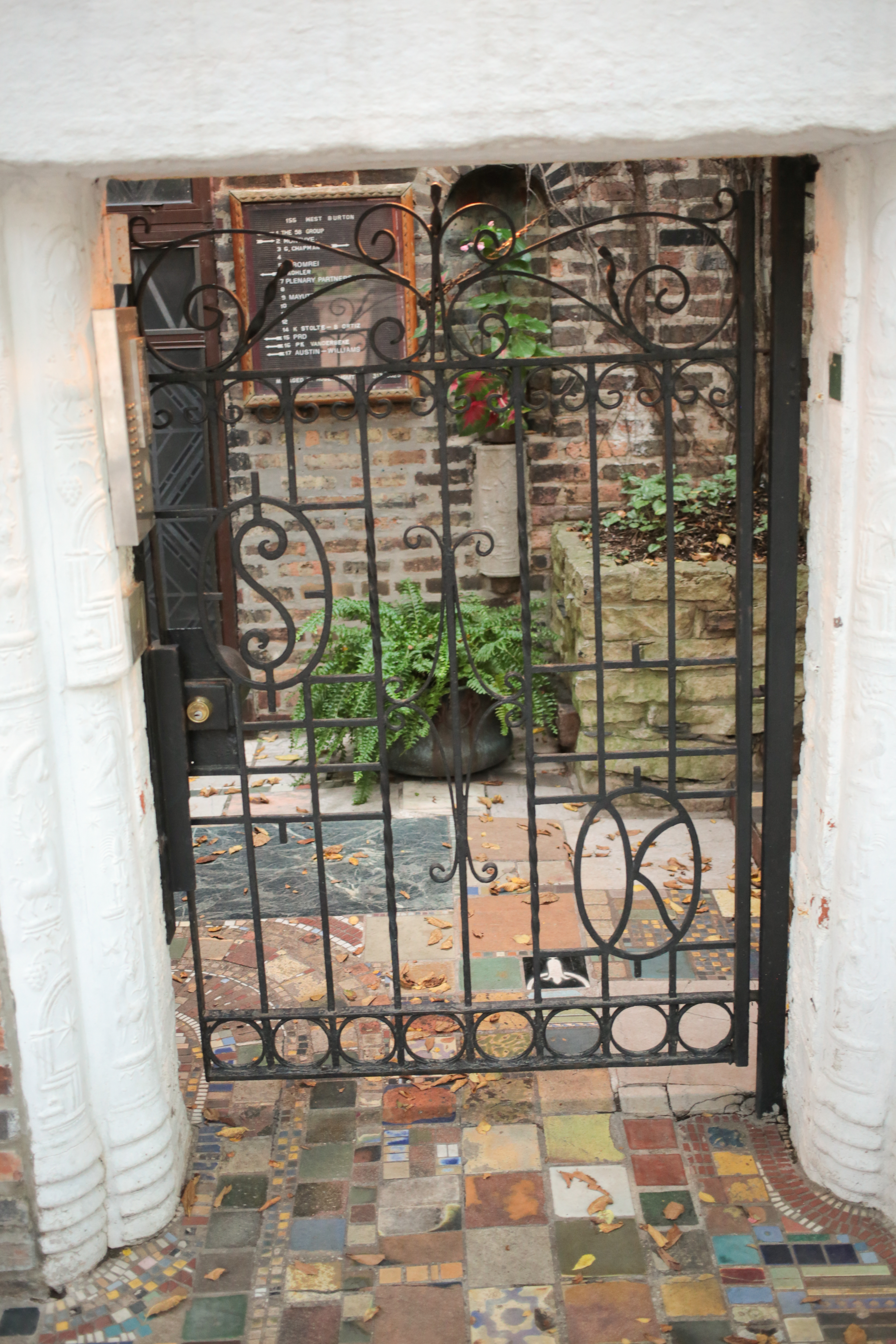
Gate with colorful paving elements

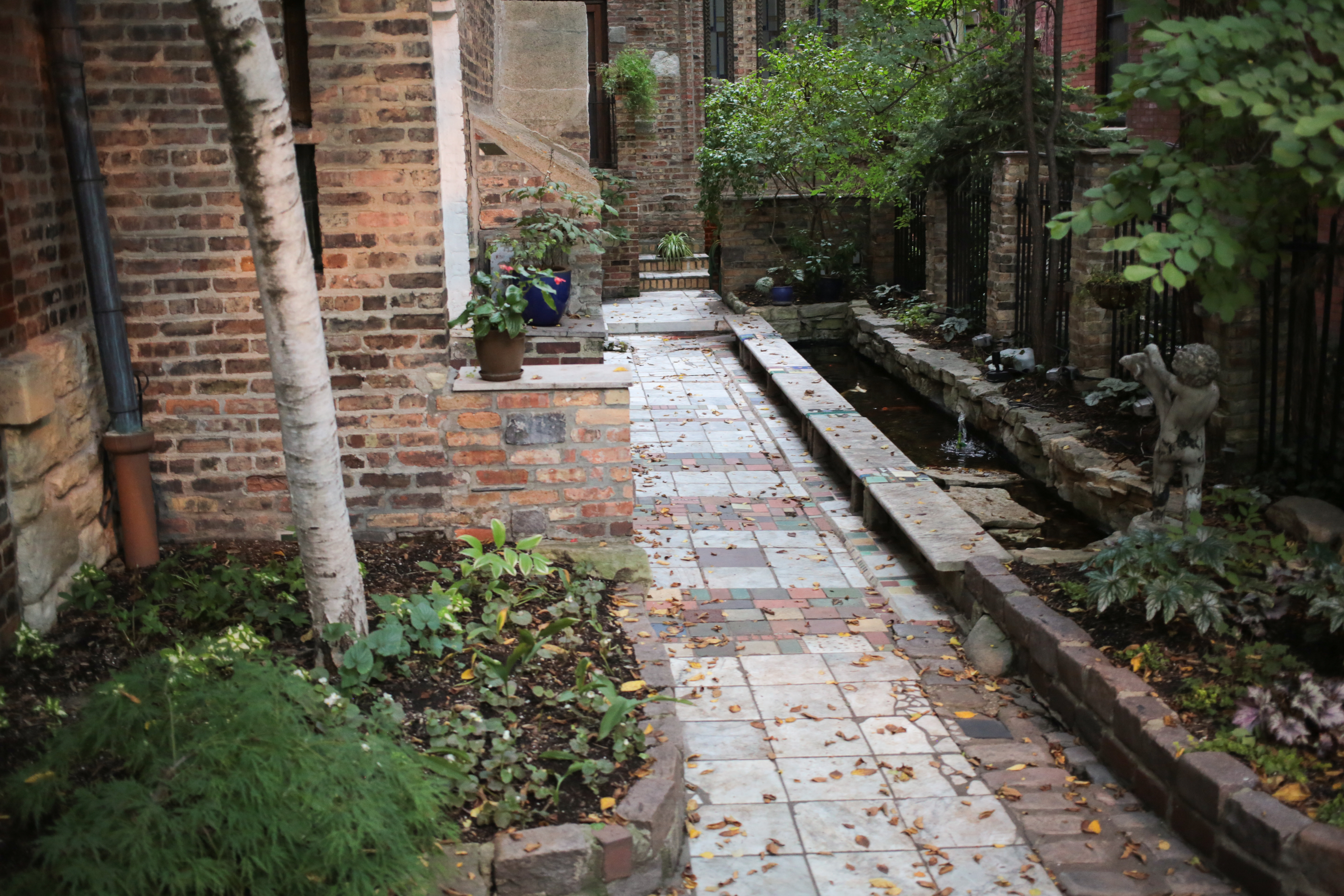
garden area

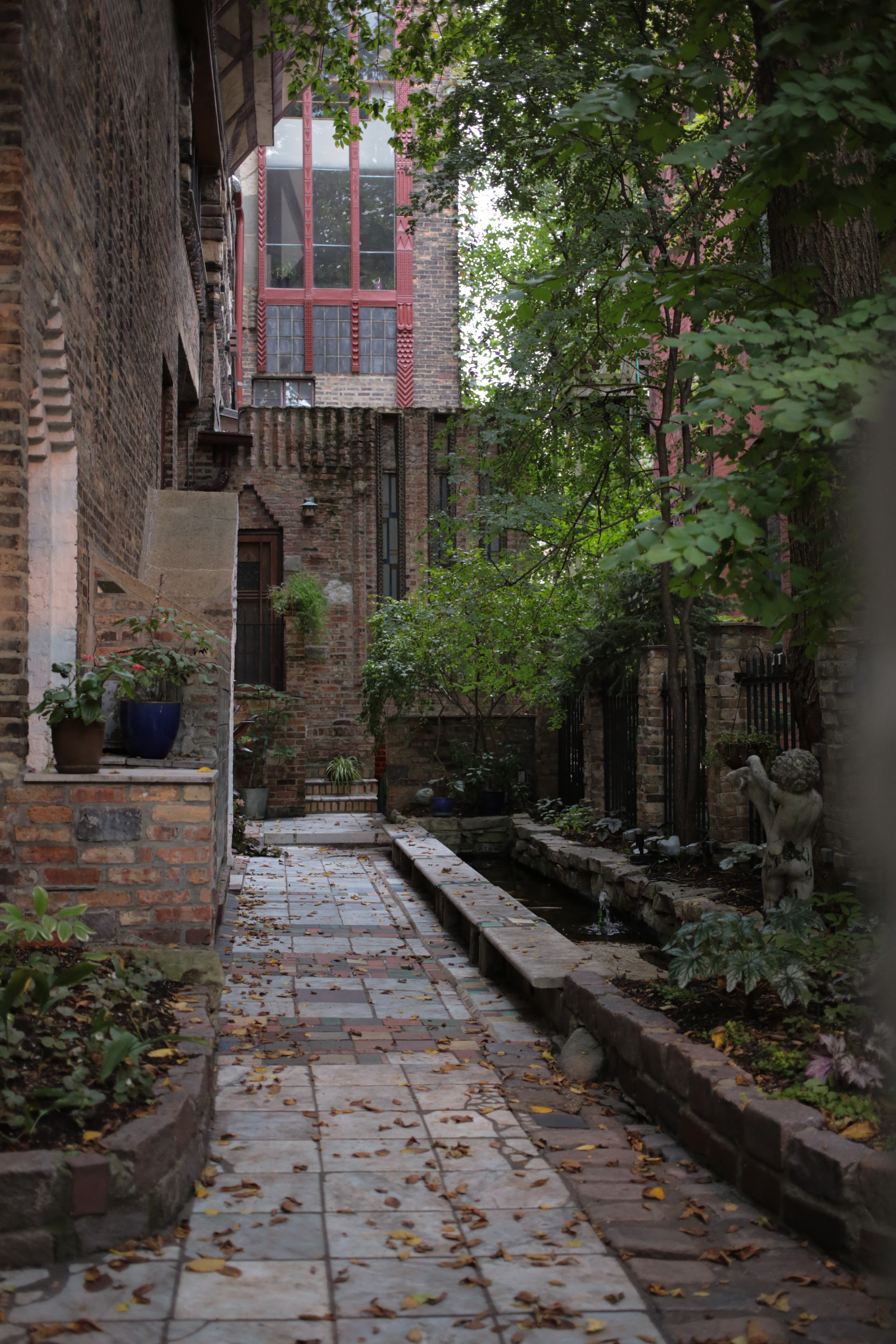
garden area

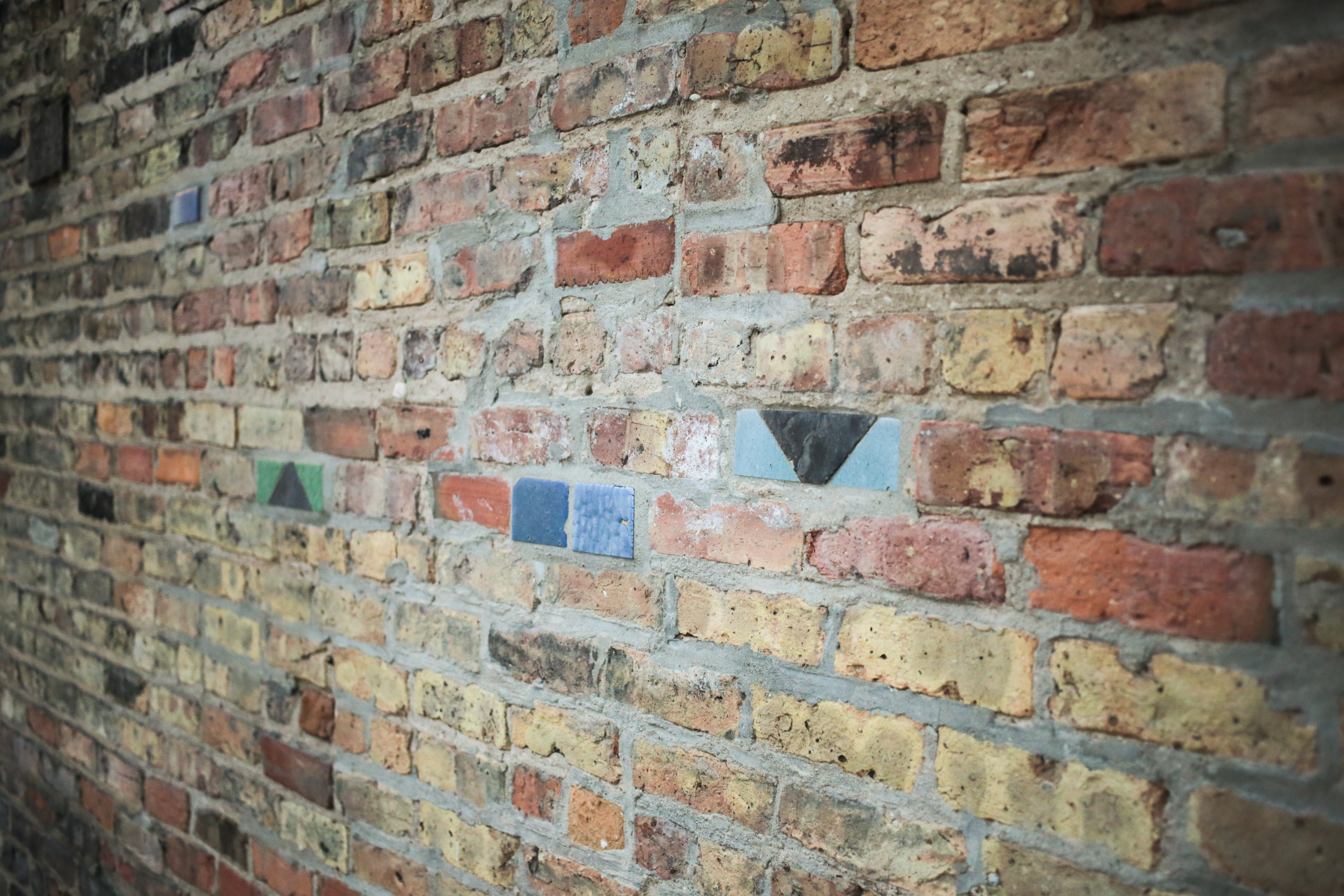
Brick Wall with a few colorful bricks

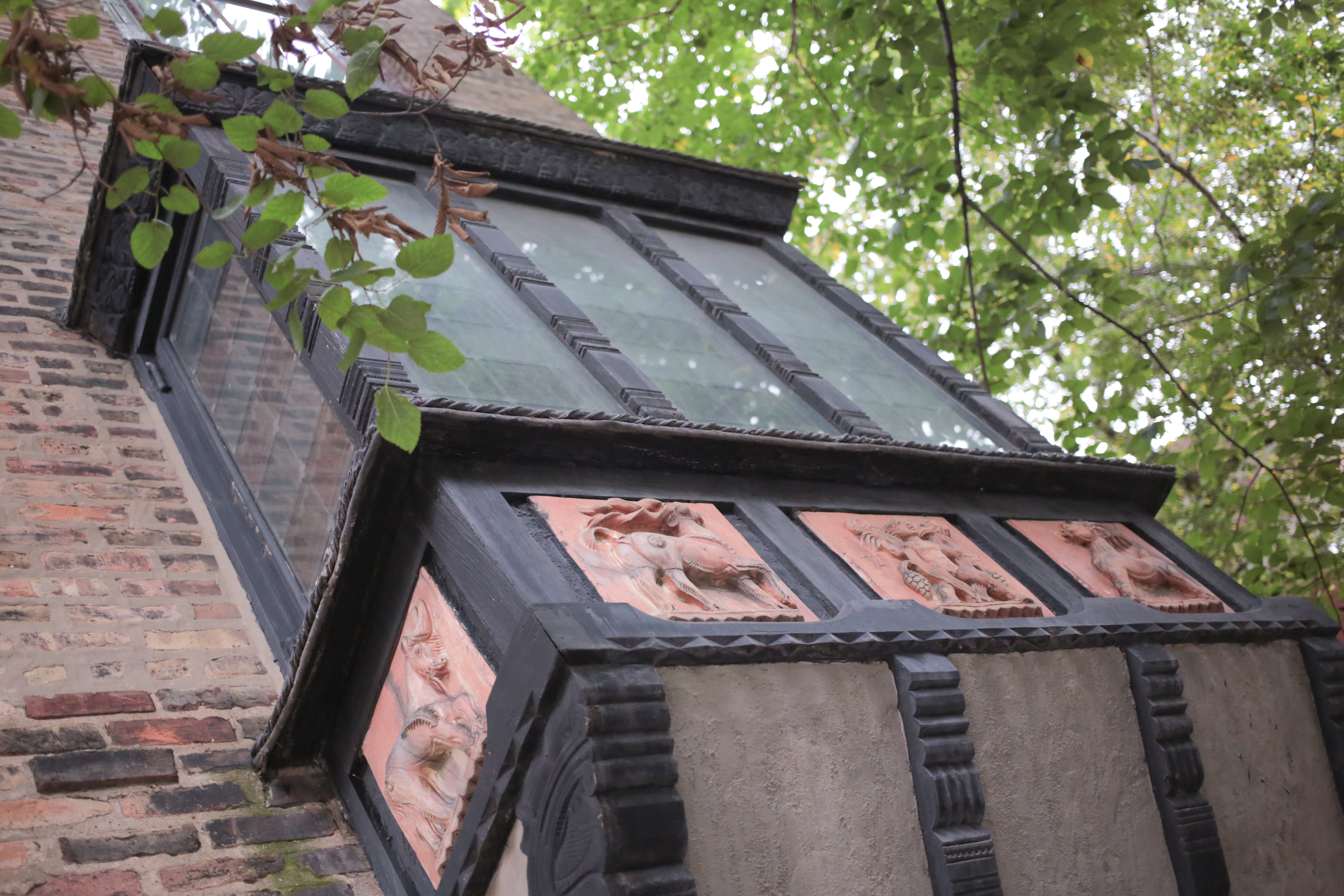
window (viewed from the sidewalk)

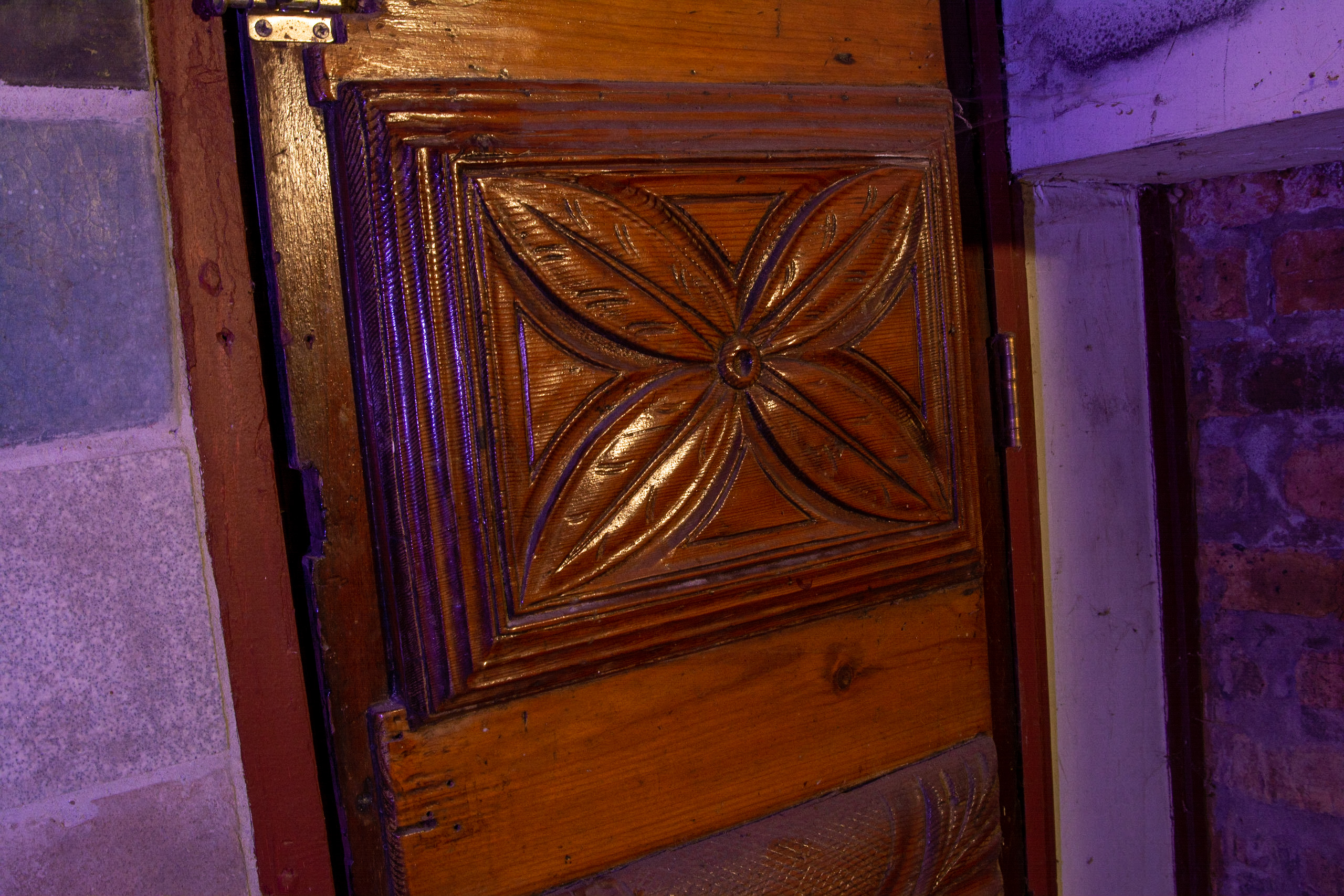
Door Panel Detail

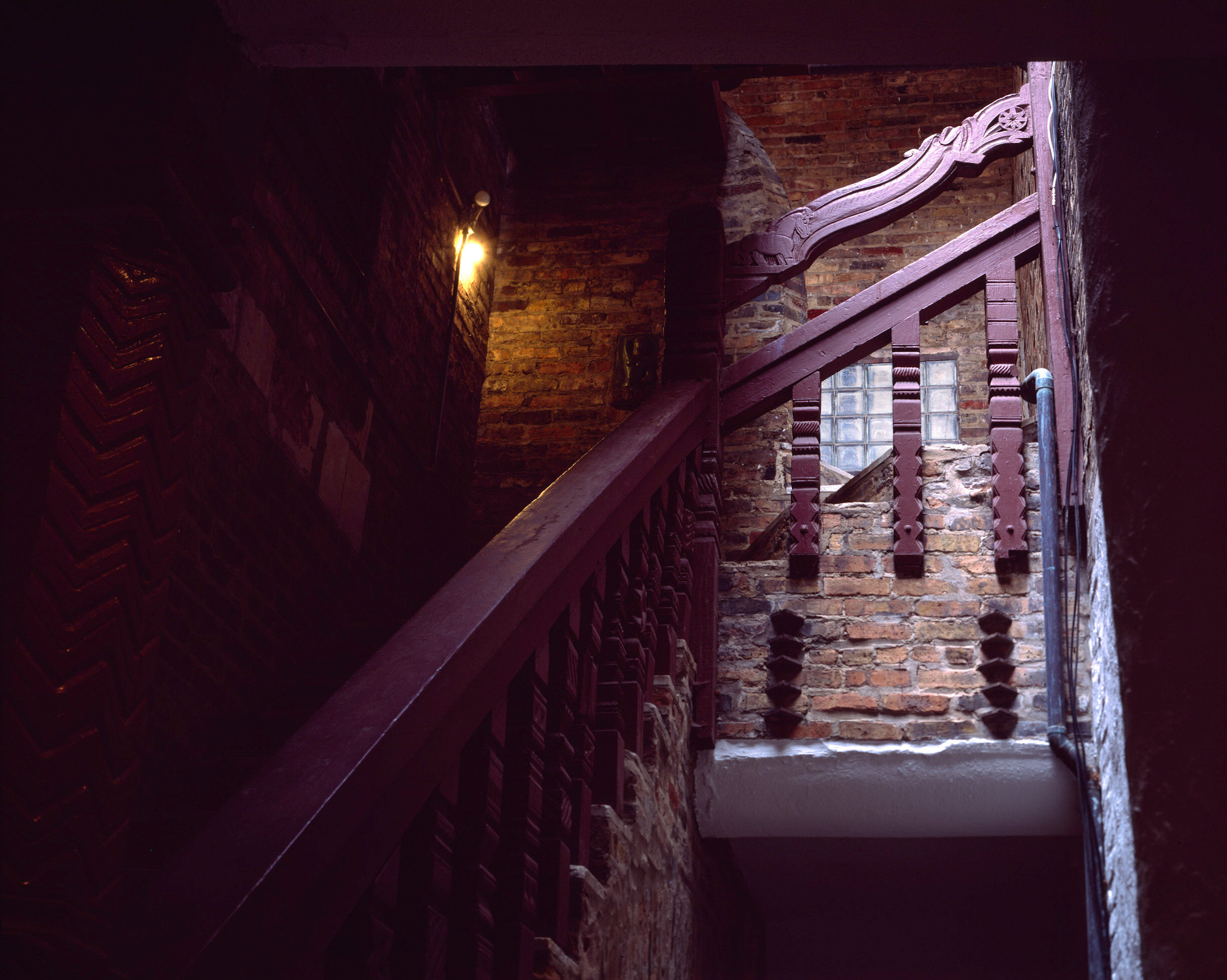
Ground-floor exterior stairwell

== Sources ==
- Studio Building is Planned for 155 Carl Street, Chicago Tribune, Aug. 21, 1927, p. G1
- Old Apartment House Answers to Modernizing, Chicago Tribune, April 29, 1934, p. C4
- Artist Colony Forms One Big Happy Family, Chicago Tribune, Nov. 15, 1942, p. N1
- Instant Attraction – The Quirky Charms of a 1930s Apartment in Old Town Mesmerized the Buyers, But Soon Those Edgar Miller Oddities Had to be Turned into Something Livable, Chicago Tribune Magazine, April 2, 2006, p. 26.
