= Madonna Della Strada Chapel =

Chapel in Chicago, Illinois

Coordinates: 41.9996°N 87.6561°W

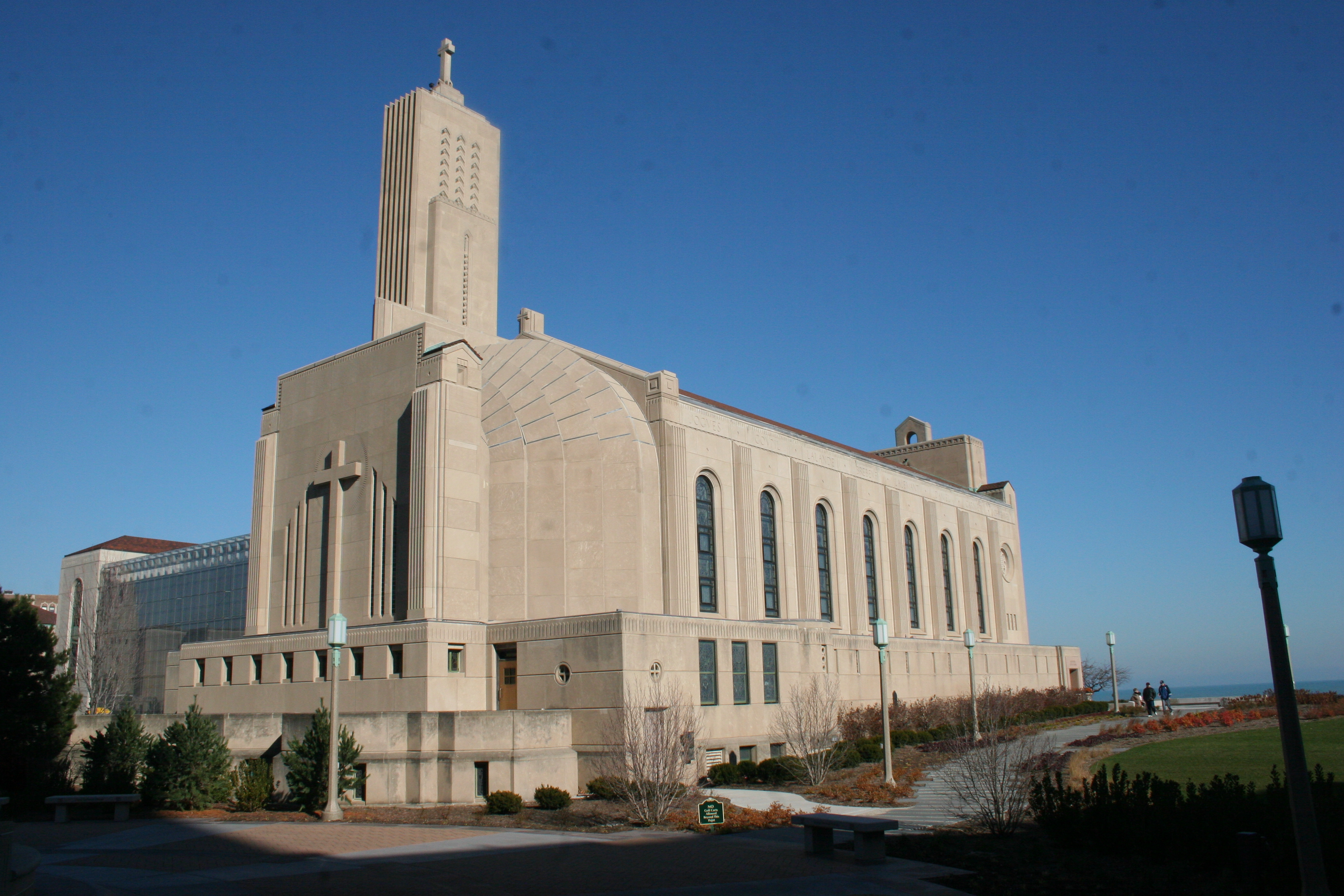
Madonna della Strada Chapel at Loyola University Chicago Lake Shore Campus

Madonna della Strada is a chapel on the Lake Shore Campus of Loyola University Chicago, in the neighborhood of Rogers Park, of Northside Chicago, and is named after the icon of the Virgin Mary, known as Madonna della Strada, enshrined at the Church of the Gesù in Rome, which is the Motherhouse of the Society of Jesus (the Jesuits).

== History ==
The Chapel was the dream of Father James Mertz, S.J., who headed the fundraising campaign for its construction. The Madonna della Strada Chapel is the main chapel on the Lake Shore Campus of Loyola University Chicago. The chapel was built on the lakefront, with original plans of the chapel to face the then proposed extensions of North Sheridan Road and Lake Shore Drive, along the shoreline of Lake Michigan, with both passing directly in front of the chapel. Although both extensions were later abandoned.

The chapel was designed by architect Andrew Rebori in the Art Deco Style and opened its doors to the Loyola University Chicago Community with a dedication ceremony in November of 1940. Of the several artists and designers responsible for artwork and decorations in the Chapel, the first was theChicago artist Melville Steinfels. Shortly after a generous gift from Mrs. Caecelia Kessler, in remembrance of her son, Lt. Philip Kessler, in 1942, Steinfels began work on the massive 32-foot high alter fresco of the Virgin Mary being crowned Queen of Heaven by her Son, Jesus.

Other works also executed by Chicago's Edgar Miller.

Several chapel churches in Latin America were named after the chapel church in Chicago, as a tribute to Loyola University Chicago, to the Jesuits, and to student missionaries.

== Stained glass windows ==
The seven stained glass windows on the north side of the nave represent the seven colleges that existed when the Chapel was built.

- Saint Thomas Aquinas - Arts & sciences
- Saint Luke - Medicine
- Saint Anne and Mary - Nursing
- Saint Thomas More - Law
- Saint Matthew - Business administration
- Saint Vincent de Paul - Social Work
- Saint Apollonia of Alexandria - Dentistry

The seven stained glass windows on the south side of the nave illustrate the principal ministries of the Jesuits.

- Saint Peter Canisius - Education
- Saint Francis Regis - Spiritual Life
- Saint Francis Xavier - Foreign Missions
- Saint Ignatius - The Spiritual Exercises
- Saint Joseph - Ministry to the Dying
- The Blessed Virgin - Sodality of Our Lady
- The Sacred Heart

== Renovations ==
Renovation of Madonna della Strada began in July 2006 and concluded in August 2007. A cooling system and mechanical ventilation system were installed.

== Katheryn "Kay" Stamm Memorial Organ ==
A new pipe organ by Goulding and Wood was built and installed in 2008. The Katheryn "Kay" Stamm Memorial Organ has 70 ranks distributed over three manuals and pedal and played via a terraced console located in the rear gallery.

The chapel hosts an annual "Midnight Organ Blast" at midnight on Halloween, featuring eerie melodies.

The Loyola University Department of Sacramental Life hosts a series of free organ concerts on the third Sunday of each month.

== See also ==
- Madonna Della Strada
