= LaSalle–Wacker Building =

Office skyscraper in Chicago, Illinois

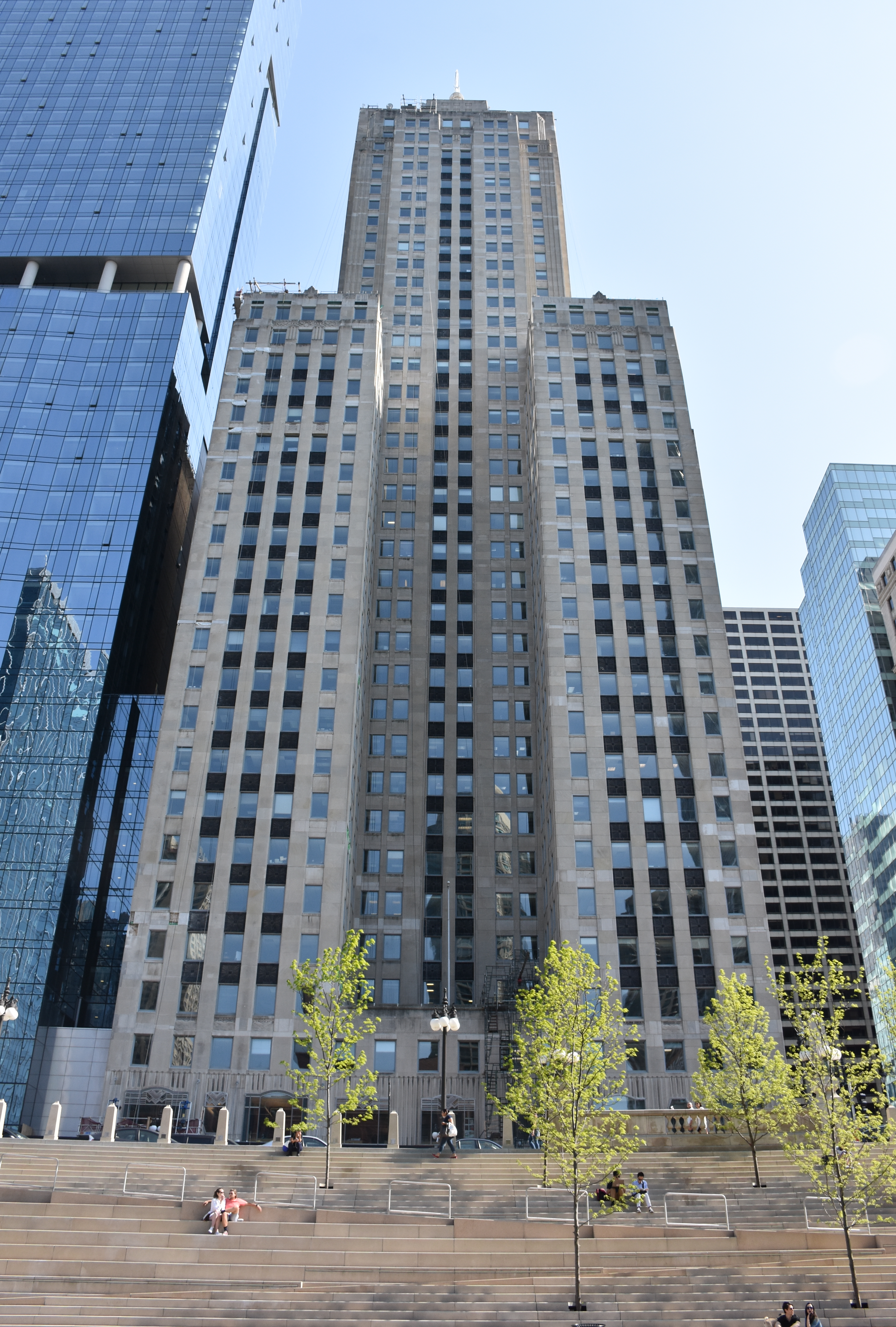
- Interactive map of the LaSalle–Wacker Building area

General information
- Status: Completed
- Type: Office
- Architectural style: Art Deco
- Location: 221 North LaSalle Street, Chicago, Illinois, United States
- Coordinates: 41.8865°N 87.6320°W
- Construction started: 1929
- Completed: 1930

Height
- Top floor: 512 ft (156 m)

Technical details
- Floor count: 41
- Floor area: 39,019 m^{2} (420,000 sq ft)

Design and construction
- Architect: Holabird and Root
- LaSalle–Wacker Building
- U.S. Historic district – Contributing property
- Part of: West Loop–LaSalle Street Historic District (ID12001238)
- Designated CP: June 1, 2013

The LaSalle–Wacker Building, at 221 North LaSalle Street (also known as 121 West Wacker Drive), is a 41-story skyscraper at the north end of the LaSalle Street canyon in the Loop community area of Chicago, Illinois, United States.

== Design ==
Originally planned as a 37-story building, the developer bought an L-shaped building aside original lot and expanded the site. Clad in limestone and granite, the Holabird and Root-designed structure (Andrew Rebori was the associate architect) serves as an office building. When built, the beacon on the top of the building could be seen from as far as 200 miles. As with other buildings in Chicago, the structure is upwardly lit at night with moonlight, and the peak of building is typically lit in cobalt blue. The nights illumination design was a common contemporary Chicago architectural theme, seen also in the Wrigley Building, Tribune Tower, Jewelers Building, Palmolive Building, and Chicago Board of Trade Building.

== In popular culture ==
The building was used as a backdrop in the 2005 movie Batman Begins. WFMT, America's first radio superstation, maintained studios in the building from 1954 until 1995.

== See also ==
- Chicago architecture
