= Fisher Studio Houses =

Building in Illinois, United States

Coordinates: 41.9043°N 87.6285°W

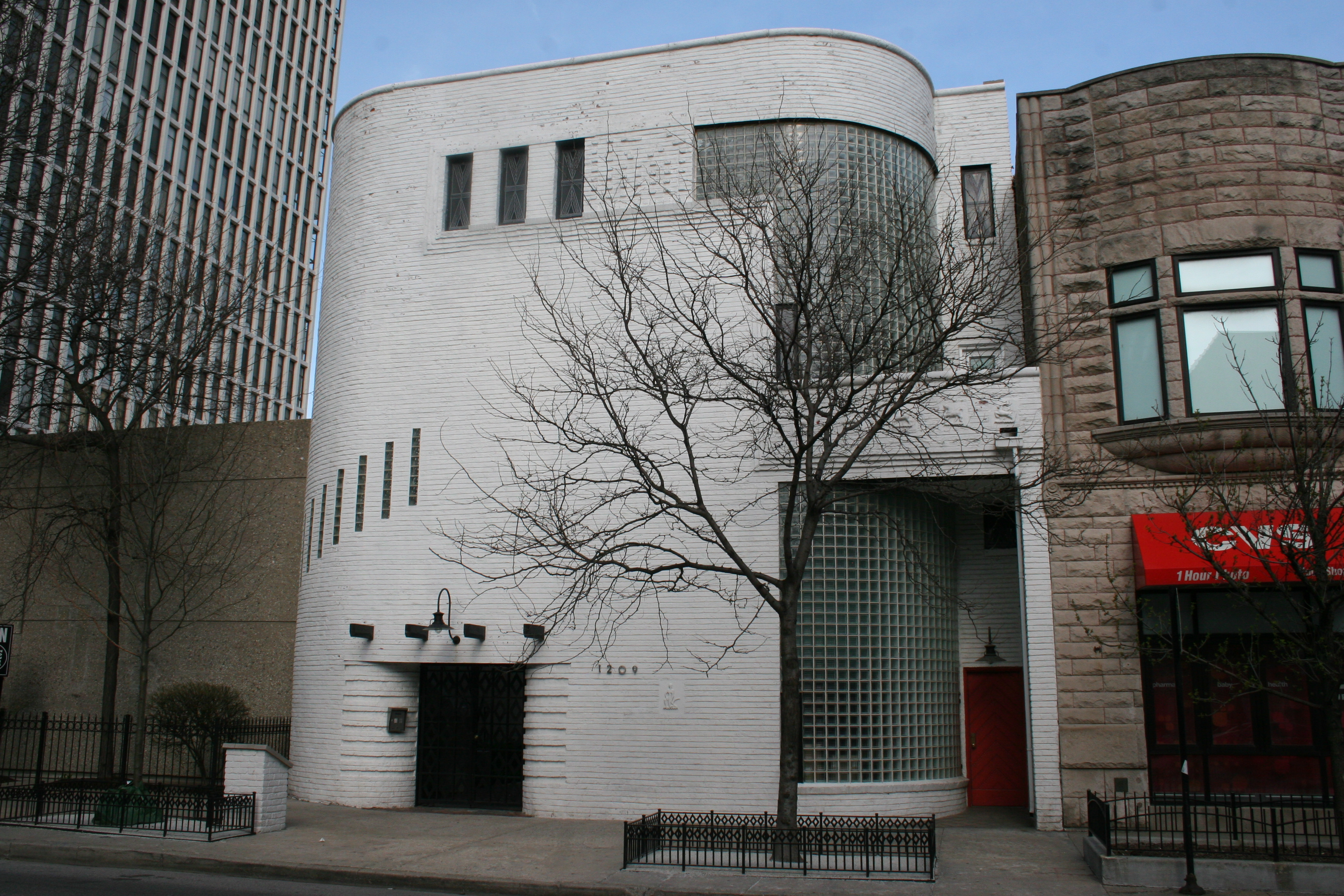
Fisher Studio Houses

The Fisher Studio Houses are a complex of 12 art moderne style residential units in Chicago, Illinois, United States. The houses were designed in 1936 by Andrew Rebori and Edgar Miller for Frank Fisher, Jr., an executive at Marshall Field & Co.

The building was designated a Chicago Landmark on July 31, 1996. The Commission on Chicago Landmarks erected a historical marker on a pedestal in the sidewalk near the front entrance.
