= Jesús Torres (footballer) =

Spanish footballer

Personal information
- Full name: Jesús Torres Junquera
- Date of birth: 13 March 1980 (age 46)
- Place of birth: Caldas de Reis, Spain
- Height: 1.83 m (6 ft 0 in)
- Position: Defender

Youth career
- 1997–1998: Arosa

Senior career*
Years	Team	Apps	(Gls)
1998–2001	Compostela B		
2001–2004	Compostela	45	(1)
2004–2005	Ponferradina	26	(0)
2005–2007	Eldense		
2007–2009	Ciudad Santiago	34	(1)
2009–2010	Compostela	16	(0)
2010–2012	Negreira	?	(1)
2012–2015	Órdenes	97	(7)
2015–2016	Bertamiráns	11	(0)
- * Club domestic league appearances and goals

Jesús Torres Junquera (born 13 March 1980 in Caldas de Reis, Pontevedra, Galicia) is a Spanish former footballer who played as a defender.
