= Jesús Torres (artist) =

American artist

Torres at the Hull-House kilns

Jesús Torres (June 29, 1898 – June 13, 1948) was a Mexican-American artist, sculptor, and designer. His facility with multiple artistic media, including clay, tile, wood, metal, and leather, made him a frequently-commissioned craftsperson in Chicago's during the 1930s and 1940s. He was one of several immigrant artists who began their practice at Jane Addams' Hull-House in the 1920s. Notable solo works include his final commission, where he was hired by the Pullman Company to design the interiors of five cars for the Golden State Limited, which traveled throughout the American Southwest.

== Early life ==
Born in Silao, Guanajuato, Mexico in 1898, Torres worked as a fieldworker until emigrating to the United States with his wife María Francisca Araujo Torres in 1924. He worked as a migrant farmworker and day laborer in Texas, before moving to St. Paul, Minnesota to work in the sugar beet fields, eventually settling in Chicago in the late 1920s.

== Career ==
After enrolling for classes in English and art at the local Settlement House, Torres began to find success at the Hull-House Kilns under the tutelage of Morris Topchevsky. His collaboration with Edgar Miller began shortly thereafter, and their design and execution of the Carl Street and Kogen-Miller studios (1927-28) in Chicago's Old Town neighborhood is considered to be a masterpiece of their partnership. By the 1940s, his interior design studio featured work in copper, silver, brass, wood, and stone. Restaurants and nightclubs featuring his art included the Radio Club in Chicago and Miller Brewing's High Life Spa in Milwaukee. In his final commission before his death in 1948, Torres was hired by the Pullman-Standard Car Manufacturing Company to execute the interior design of the Rock Island and Southern Pacific's Golden Rocket train cars.

== Style and influences ==
The Best-Maugard Design Method, one of the styles taught in the Hull-House art curriculum, was heavily influenced by pre-Columbian indigenous design elements. It is possible that Torres encountered this method in Mexico, as it was a popular text in Mexican schools upon its publication in 1922. Certainly, Torres was exposed to Best-Maugard at Hull-House, and the design elements foundational to the method are apparent in his work: "the spiral, circle, half circle, ‘s’, wavy line, broken line, and straight line, all derived from Aztec and Mayan motifs." Mesoamerican-inspired design would be Torres' calling card throughout his career, culminating in the distinctly Mayan-inspired Pullman cars designed at the end of his life. The artist's galleries at 5136 Blackstone Avenue in Hyde Park, where Torres lived and worked in the middle of his career, featured Torres' tile and ceramic work (as well as his woodwork) in this bold, geometric style.

== Gallery ==
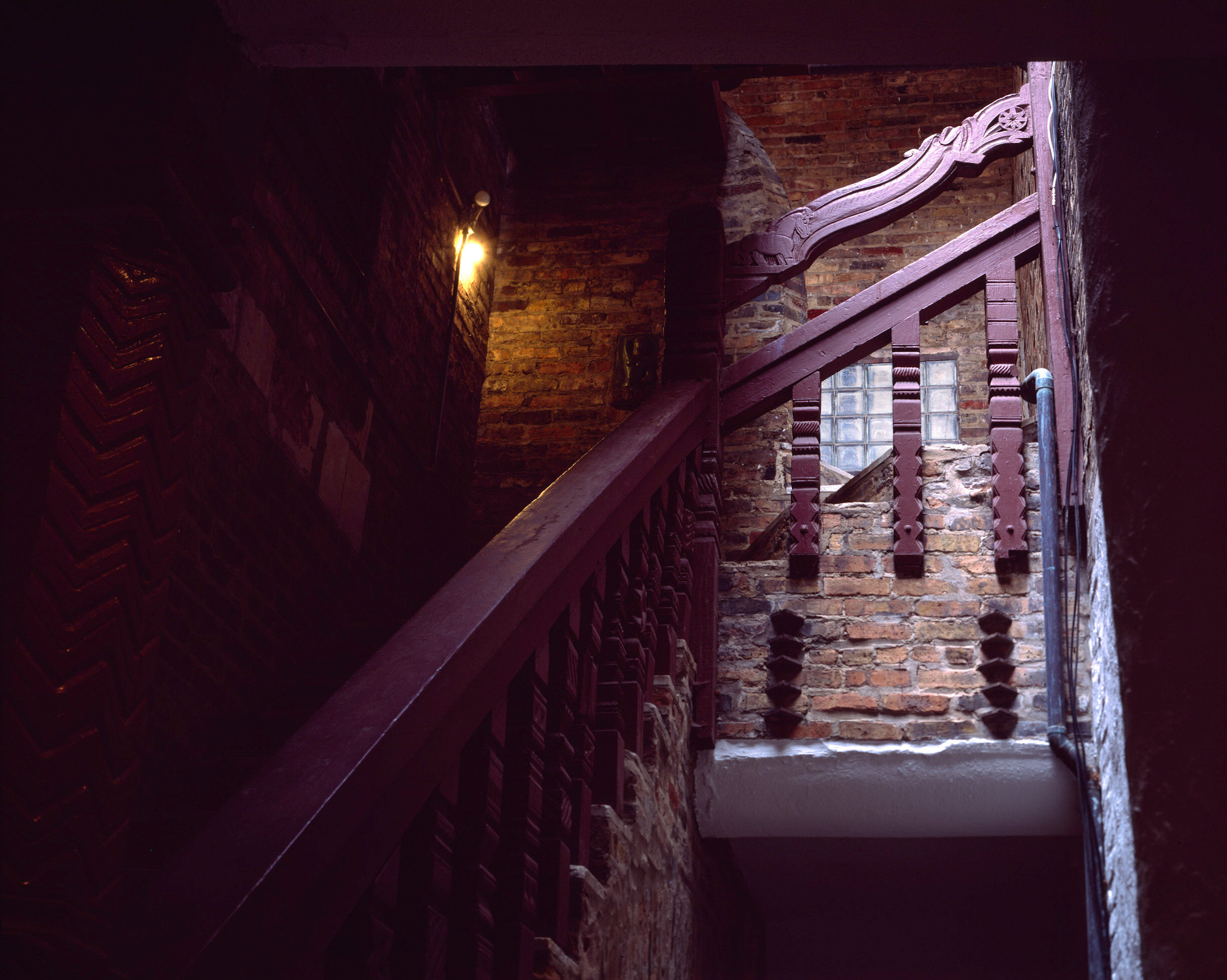
Ground floor exterior stairwell at Carl Street Studios. The hand-carved balusters and railings were executed by Torres and Edgar Miller.

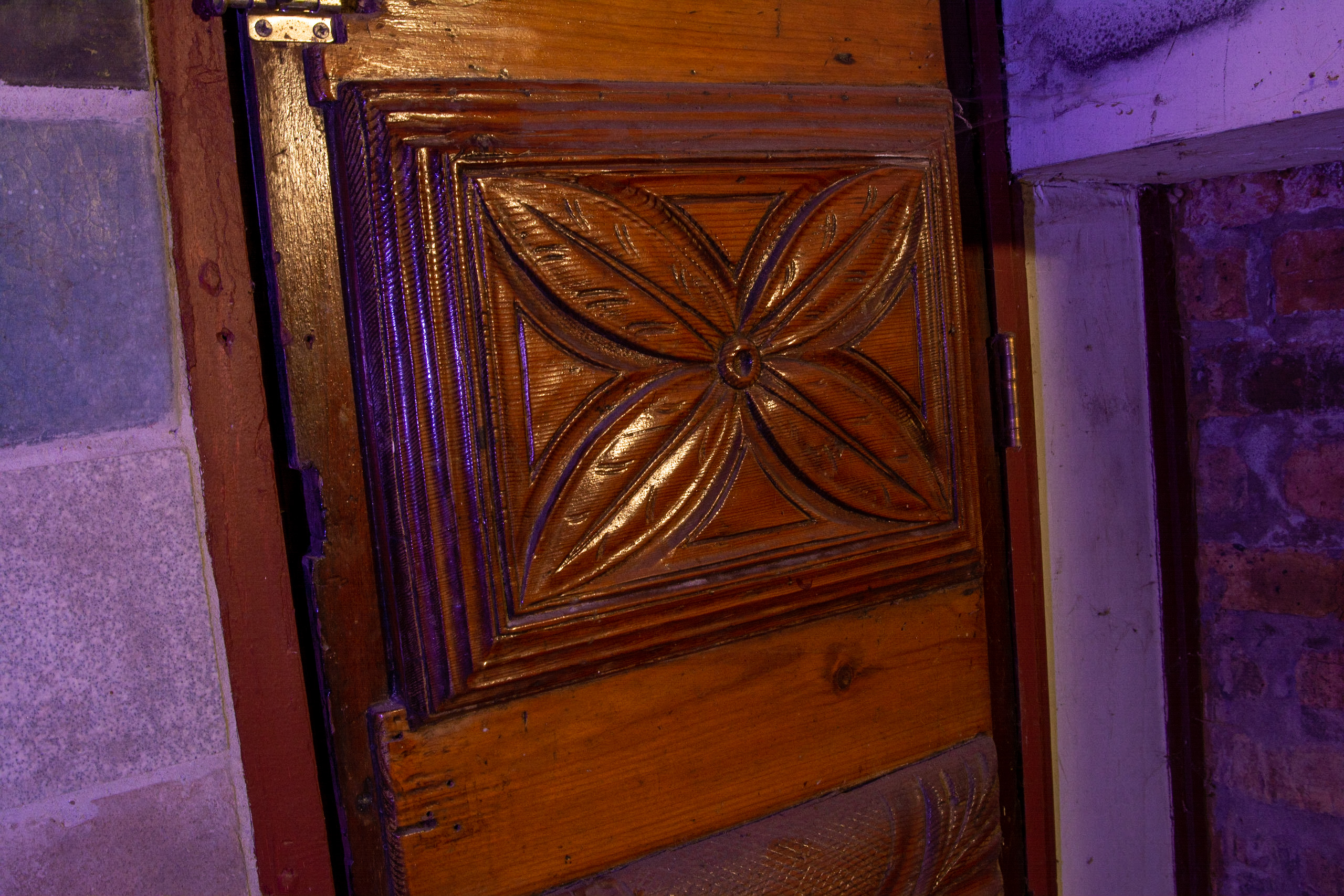
Detail of door panel at Carl Street Studios. Torres collaborated with Edgar Miller on the Studios and did much of the woodcarving.
