= Edgar Miller (artist) =

American designer, painter, craftsman, woodcarver and stained-glass designer

- Born: James Edgar Miller; December 17, 1899; Idaho Falls, Idaho, US
- Died: June 1, 1993 (aged 93); Chicago, Illinois, US
- Education: Art Institute of Chicago

James Edgar Miller (1899–1993) was an American designer, painter, craftsman, master woodcarver and one of the nation's foremost stained-glass designers. He could sculpt and draw, and he was considered a pioneer in the use of graphic art in advertising. In the 1920s, he was called "the blond boy Michelangelo"; in the 1930s, "a new luminary" by Architecture Magazine; in the 1940s, "one of the most versatile artists in America." By the 1950s, he was the go-to person for some of the nation's most successful industrial designers.

== Early life ==
Miller's father, James Edgar Miller, was born in 1857 in Michigan's lumber country. He was related to Joaquin Miller (1837–1913), the well-known essayist, poet and Pony Express rider. He moved to what is now Idaho Falls, Idaho (then called Eagle Rock) in 1878 to open a small jewelry store after he became interested in watchmaking and engraving. Later on in his life he studied optometry and eventually became a beekeeper. His mother, Hester Elizabeth Gibson Martin, was born in 1864 in Missouri. She was a school teacher who taught the Choctaw Indians/People/Native Americans in the Oklahoma Territory; she eventually moved to Idaho to search for work with her brothers and sisters. One of Edgar's fond memories of her is when Hester took her kids alone to visit the Alaska-Yukon-Pacific Exposition, the World's Fair of 1909. Hester and James married in 1895 in Idaho Falls; they had five children: Lucille in 1897, (James) Edgar in 1899, Frank in 1900, Hester in 1903 and Fauntleroy in 1906 (known as Buddy or Eugene).

Edgar Miller loved the Great American West. Idaho Falls, a western frontier town of little more than one thousand people, served as a central inspiration for many of Edgar's motifs and ideas in his art – history, science, and nature. He displayed a strong artistic talent and imagination very early on. Around the age of four, after he saw a painting of Custer's last stand at the Battle of the Little Big Horn, he decided to fully pursue art: "I could imagine no other existence but to be an artist." Also, his cousin, Ladd Wright, whom he adored, was a famous rodeo star; later on Edgar named his own son Ladd. When Miller was seven, his father gave him a bay pony. Horses, and animals in general, are prominent and frequently presented in Edgar's art and designs: "The affection for her became a definite part of me." In a much later interview, Miller said, "Animals are representations of life and vitality." At 9 years old he created complete illustrations of his favorite poems, Tennyson's "Lady of Shalott" and Longfellow's "Skeleton in Armor". Couple years later he became an apprentice at an architectural company as a watercolorist: "My greatest enthusiasm as a boy was for the wildflower." Jo He (real name Orzo French Eastman 1828–1916) lived at the edge of Idaho Falls around the turn of the Century. He was a bearded patriarch "who looked very much like Walt Whitman in his old age." Miller wrote often about his visits to see Jo He. The older man taught Edgar about art and also showed him a home which he built and designed – "he carved stone, built his own home, was a tanner, taxidermist, imaginative gardener, inventor, mural painter, saddle-maker and sheet metal worker." Miller was enthralled with this "handmade home", and with the two-story workroom within, built above his living quarters. Here, Jo He executed taxidermy, worked on saddles, braided whips and rope et al. Edgar recalled that Jo He told him "'If you want to do anything, go ahead and do it', all I had to do was try." In 1913 Edgar, with his father and brother Frank, moved to Australia to help James run his apiary. It was a happy and adventurous time which brought him to a deeper understanding of nature, and the essence of existence. They took the S.S. Tahiti, a twin-screw freighter, for a 28-day voyage across the Pacific. After 12 days they reached Papeete, capital of Tahiti (which was then French Polynesia). Then to New Zealand, Sydney Australia, Melbourne and eventually Maldon. Life raising bees in Australia became difficult after a year or two, and they made their way back to Idaho a few months later.

== Education and apprenticeship ==
Edgar Miller arrived in Chicago in January 1917, enrolled at the Art Institute and took a room in the Jane Addams Hullhouse (the nation's first settlement house). He took classes with Louis W. Wilson, whose theories about sound and color interested him. Also, he met George Bellows at the SAIC around 1919. Bellows showed Miller some of his ideas on symmetry and space regarding painting and pictures, which made an important impression on him. Already doubtful of academia, Miller wrote, "It was never revealed that the circular pupil of the eye gives us a circular field of vision. This pattern antedates the conventional rectangular forms that surround us when architecture became an established part of human life." At school he also met Sol Kogen, his future partner for the Carl Street Studios and the Kogen-Miller Studios. In 1919 he won the Frank G. Logan Medal from the Art Institute for his batiks. The same year he was hired as an apprentice in the design studio of Alfonso Iannelli; spent five years working on advertising, design, packaging, ink drawings, mural posters, stained glass and cut stone. Through Iannelli, Miller met important studio clients like Marshall Field & Company and Holabird & Root, and developed a network of future employers.

== First successes as a designer and working artist ==
In his 20s Edgar was already an active and established artist in Chicago's creative world, designing illustrations for books and ads for Marshall Field's Fashions of the Hour magazine, amongst many other commissions and projects. He also busily promoted other arts and artists; for example, he introduced musical works by composers Stravinsky, Ravel, DeBussy and Prokofiev at his short-lived gallery space, The House at the End of the Street. He ran it for a few years, and afterwards helped run a gallery on the top floor of the Dil Pickle Club, a bohemian hangout in the neighborhood of Tower Town. It was frequented by people like Ben Reitman "The Hobo Doctor", Dorothy Day, Ben Hecht, Clarence Darrow, Sherwood Anderson and Carl Sandburg. In 1921, he married artist and musician Dorothy Ann Wood. They had three children: Iris Ann in 1921, Gisela in 1923, and David in 1925. Their marriage was a challenge, and according to his brother Frank: "When two people are as implacably incompatible, nothing short of separation can help." Edgar left his wife and the children in 1929, but Dorothy refused his requests for divorce. He began seriously experimenting with stained-glass during the 1920s as well. In 1923, he won his second Logan Medal, this time for his stained-glass work; Howard Van Doren Shaw was one of the judges of the competition. They became professional contacts afterwards, and Miller designed stained-glass windows for three Shaw buildings. The two were set to collaborate on two Shaw commissioned World War I naval monuments, but Shaw died in 1926. "In 1927, an opportunity presented itself," he wrote; "it was to create an environment that could include all the 'lesser arts.' Through enjoyment and curiosity, I had gathered most of the ingredients of my idea of an 'environment.' I had done work at the terra cotta factory; over-glaze I had done in the school years. Stained-glass and textiles I had investigated. I had a Logan Medal for both stained glass and batiks by 1923. A long apprenticeship had given me experience in sculpture, casting, stone cutting and wood carving, as well as mural painting. All I needed was a project." Around 1927 Sol Kogen, his friend from the Art Institute, brought his idea – of finding and rehabilitating old houses in an artistic manner – to Miller. It became their greatest project, and also came to define the Old Town neighborhood of Chicago. They began the Carl Street Studios, a multi-unit remodeling of a double-lot Victorian house built in 1874. Miller, as the artistic director and designer, went room by room creating new living spaces; and Kogen, more the contractor than a creative partner, went and found parts, tools and assistants. Both of them embraced salvaging and repurposing discarded building materials for their construction needs. Andrew Rebori, notable architect and future Miller cohort, served as the consulting architect, but he said he was rarely asked for advice. A 1943 article in the New York Times by Paul A. Hochman says about the Carl Street Studios, "In this one structure, there's a touch of Moderne, Deco, Prairie, Tudor, Mission, a little English Country House, and Arts and Crafts. The whole thing is a poem, but it's free verse." Talented and ambitious Mexican artisan Jesus Torres was Miller's main assistant on the Carl Street project. Kogen and Miller begin their second multi-unit, artists' residence remodeling project in 1928, the Kogen-Miller complex on Wells Street. It would eventually yield nine units. The rear building was leased to Rudolph W. Glasner, businessman and patron of the Art Institute, who commissioned Edgar to design and execute "a party house" for him. Here Miller attempted his first major woodcarvings, his stained-glass ideas are fresh and original, and in general his work across many mediums is regarded as some of his best ever. This handmade home, which is known as the Glasner Studio, is his masterwork "total environment". Of this Wells Street complex, the Kogen-Miller Studios, Alice McKinstry wrote in the August 1930 issue of Woman Athletic: "homes that you have no right to live in unless you understand, and like, DeBussy's music, and Roerich's paintings, and Dudley Poore's poetry, and Anton Bruehl's photographs, and the dynamic folly of Adolf Bolm's ju-ju dance." Bolm had a studio at Carl Street.

== 1930s – "a new luminary" ==
During the 1930s Miller was one of Chicago's most prominent artists. In '31, there was a large exhibit at the Art Institute's Summer Show of a wide variety of his work, including carved chairs, benches, glazed pottery, mosaics and terracotta columns. It was universally applauded. The art critic C.J. Bulliet wrote of it, "In fact, an old Florentine master come to life in this machine age." Also in 1931, he completed cut lead windows for the executive offices of the Palmolive Building. For the 1933 World's Fair, A Century of Progress, Edgar (with the help of Andrew Rebori) helped design and execute the Streets of Paris exhibit, and ran the concessions with other artists. The nudity of female performers at some of the concessions almost led to a scandal when a petition was issued to shut down the exhibit for being "lewd and lascivious". In court, the judge struck (down) the charge: "it is not the business of this court." For the Animal Court project at Jane Addams Homes in 1935, Miller was hired by the federal government to design a series of stone animal sculptures ranging from 700lbs to several tons each. In the same year, his mural Love Through the Ages, made its debut. In 1936 Edgar joins Andrew Rebori to design Frank Fisher Apartments. Fisher was a Marshall Field's & Company executive. It was Miller's final handmade home, and the only one he built from scratch. "Miller and Rebori broke the mold when they designed that building", wrote artist Larry Zgoda. They called it "an opportunity to work toward a conception of human organic modern architecture that can achieve compact, livable, light house-keeping units in minimum workable space, with added factors of comfort and beauty." This complex was also the first air-conditioned apartment house in Chicago. Also in 1935, Miller completed the plaster plaques at Punch and Judy Theatre, as well as the ornate lead cut grill of various laborers for the Trustees System Service Building.

== 1940s – "one of the most versatile artists in America" ==
Miller finally received a divorce from Dorothy in 1940. He promptly married Dale Holcomb, a textile designer whom he met while she was working at the Streets of Paris exhibit in the 1933 World's Fair. Their first son, Norman, was born in 1941, and their second son, Ladd, in 1943. The 1940s meant bigger jobs for Edgar. For example, in 1941 Miller created bas-relief sculptures for Northwestern University's Technological Institute and he again worked with Andrew Rebori on the Dr. Philip Weintraub House. He made a history of brewing beer, in fresco, on the walls of the Pabst Brewing Company's taproom, the Sternewirt, in 1943. Around this time he created the Tower Court Collection of wallpaper designs for Bassett and Vollum. In the middle 1940s he was commissioned to create a history of eating mural for New York's Pierre Hotel. In Washington, D.C., he designed murals and bas-relief sculptures for the Statler Hotel, now the Capital Hilton.

== A fulfilling family life and a darling of the design world ==
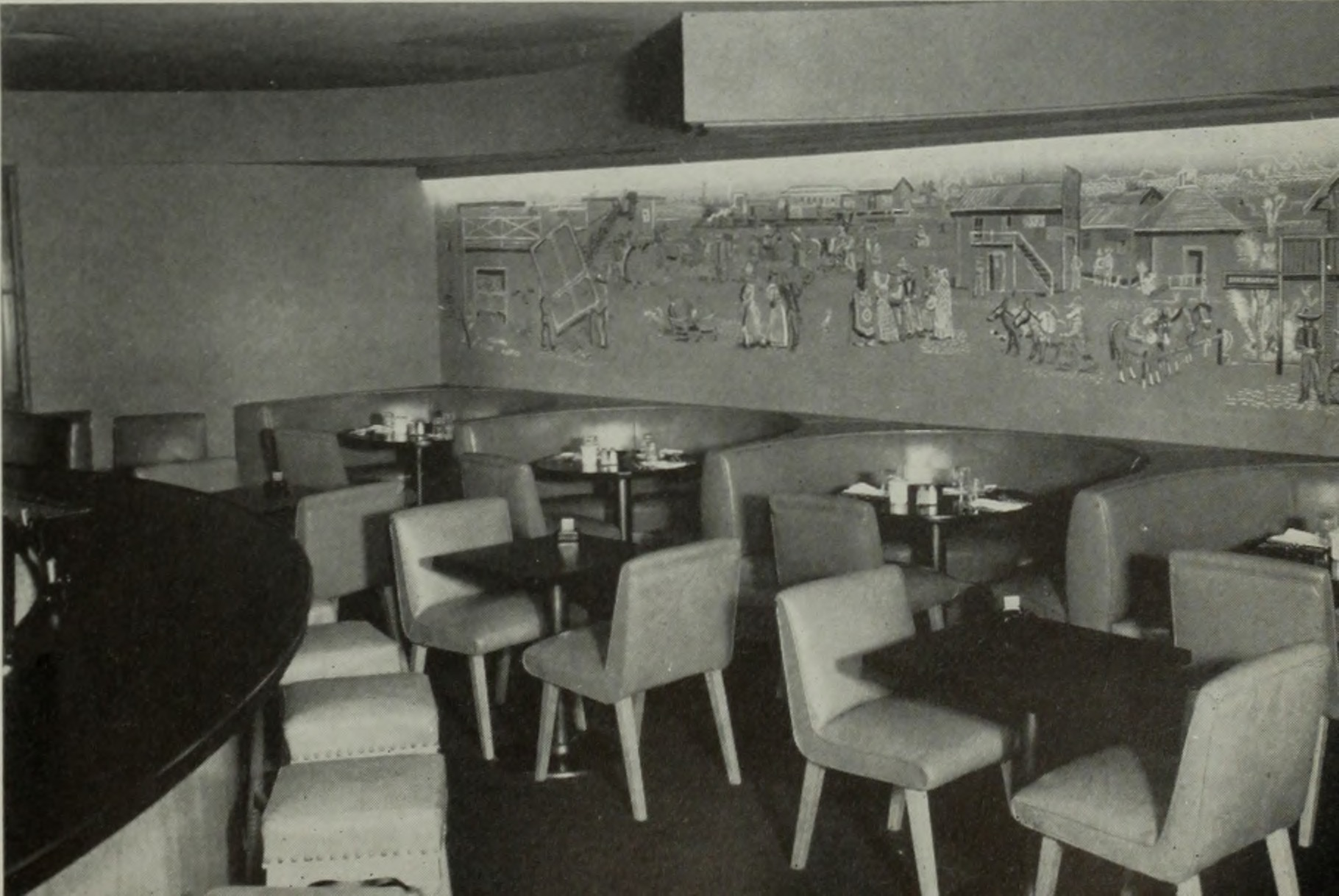
Restaurant mural, circa 1947

The early 1950s finds Miller and his family living in an 18-room mansion overlooking Lake Michigan on Chicago's north side:

"That's where the family of Edgar Miller lives and works in a crazy quilt pattern incomprehensible to ordinary mortals. They are artists, the whole family of them. Edgar and his wife and their two sons and his mother-in-law and their teacher of Chinese. Yes, they all study Chinese together. And Malayan and Bengalese. While the boys hook rugs and the elders print textiles."

— George Murray, in the Chicago American, 1957.

Norman Miller, known as Skippy, was a natural artist like his father, and Edgar held exhibits of his art. Jean Sibelius, the Finnish composer, was an admirer of Skippy's work and once wrote him a fan letter.

Around that time, Edgar mostly focused on ecclesiastical work, creating many new stained-glass windows for churches, temples and hospitals. In 1950, he was hired by the Container Corporation of America to design a poster for its Great Ideas of Western Man series. Then a series of new commissions: murals depicting Chicago history for the Chicago Title and Trust Company, barbecue scenes for a Fred Harvey restaurant, foyer and bar murals for the Palmer House hotel, a company history of the Hudson Pulp and Paper Corporation, and several sculptural projects for Jo Mead Designs. Notably, in 1954 he was commissioned by the Standard Club to design two sets of glass doors and four murals. The murals were carved onto large black linoleum panels. In 1959, Miller was hired to produce murals for the Marco Polo Club in the Waldorf-Astoria in New York City. Back in Chicago, he designed sculptures for the new United States Gypsum Building. The second Love Through the Ages mural was painted at the Tavern Club in 1961; the first one was taken down and cut up into about eighty paintings which were sold to raise money for the club.

== End of an era ==
At the age of 67, in 1967, Miller and his wife Dale sold their mansion on North Sheridan road and moved to Florida. They purchased several pieces of real estate, one being a motel. Edgar became an innkeeper, but still made art. "It was a long time before I knew Edgar Miller as more than the proprietor of the Roxy Motel," wrote Pamela Peters in a 1975 St. Petersburg Times article. Miller also told Peters about a book he was writing on a structural and proportional organization of art. It connected to the early meeting and discussions with George Bellows at the Art Institute in 1919. Those conversations about perspective and line value lead him, years later, to experiment with the proportions of classic paintings by graphing circles and lines over reproductions. He was convinced he would eventually introduce a universal theory about extending every line found in a painting. "An artist falls in love with a particular pattern of the universe making harmony of it. Love. That's the basis of it. There's a kind of love for the work one is doing that one never outgrows. Age doesn't dim this enthusiasm." His wife, Dale, died in 1977. In 1978, he traveled back to Chicago for a short spell. He met the new owner of the Glasner Studio, Lucy Montgomery, who was a wealthy civil rights activist and philanthropist. She used Miller's handmade home as a meeting ground and safe house for radicals like Fred Hampton, Angela Davis and Eldridge Cleaver, and for groups like the Black Panthers. Montgomery also commissioned Miller to create more stained-glass windows for her home. Three Chicago admirers, Jannine Aldinger, Mark Mamolen and Fleming Wilson, flew to San Francisco in 1986 to see Edgar and potentially bring him back to Chicago. Although living in questionable circumstances in the Bay Area, and seemingly on the decline, Miller revitalized when he returned to Chicago and began to actively produce art. In 1987 he was declared one of the founders of Old Town when he received an award from two Old Town organizations. And in 1990, Mayor Richard M. Daley inducted Edgar into the Chicago Senior Citizens Hall of Fame.

== Death and legacy ==
Sometime around 1991, Miller took a fall down some stairs at his Carl Street studio. This accident ruined his depth perception and apparently made him blind in one eye. "Really stopped him in his tracks," Frank Miller wrote. James Edgar Miller died June 1, 1993, from a massive stroke. He was 93 years old.

== Exhibitions ==
In 2024-25 the DePaul Art Museum in Chicago curated and hosted Edgar Miller: Anti-Modern, 1917–1967, the most extensive solo presentation of Miller's work featuring examples of his drawing, painting, sculpture, printmaking, illustration and graphic design, textiles, ceramics, jewelry, woodcarving, stained glass, interior design, and architectural projects, alone and in collaboration with other artists.
