= Vestey =

Vestey may refer to:

- Vestey Group, a group of food production companies
  - Vestey's Meatworks, slaughterhouse in Darwin, Northern Territory, Australia in operation 1917–1920
- Baron Vestey, peerage of the United Kingdom
- Vestey baronets, two British baronetcies

== People with the surname ==
- Edmund Hoyle Vestey (1932–2007), English businessman
- Sir Edmund Vestey, 1st Baronet (1866–1953), English businessman
- Samuel Vestey, 2nd Baron Vestey (1882-1954), English peer
- Samuel Vestey, 3rd Baron Vestey (1941–2021), English businessman
- William Vestey, 1st Baron Vestey (1859–1940), English businessman
