= National Register of Historic Places listings in Nuckolls County, Nebraska =

Location of Nuckolls County in Nebraska

Nuckolls County, Nebraska, United States, has seven properties and districts listed on the National Register of Historic Places.

This National Park Service list is complete through NPS recent listings posted October 30, 2026.

== Current listings ==
| | Name on the Register | Image | Date listed | Location | City or town | Description |
|---|---|---|---|---|---|---|
| 1 | Wallace Warren and Lillian Genevieve Bradshaw Kendall House | Wallace Warren and Lillian Genevieve Bradshaw Kendall House | December 10, 1993 (#93001402) | 412 E. 7th St. 40°01′24″N 98°04′00″W | Superior | |
| 2 | Lawrence Opera House | Lawrence Opera House | September 28, 1988 (#88000933) | 2nd and Calvert Sts. 40°17′31″N 98°15′36″W | Lawrence | |
| 3 | Nelson Cemetery Walk | Nelson Cemetery Walk | December 5, 2002 (#02001480) | Northeast edge of Nelson parallel to a county road 40°12′20″N 98°04′39″W | Nelson | |
| 4 | Nuckolls County Courthouse | Nuckolls County Courthouse | January 10, 1990 (#89002219) | 150 S. Main St. 40°12′14″N 98°04′04″W | Nelson | |
| 5 | Stewart Bridge | Stewart Bridge | June 29, 1992 (#92000717) | County road over Big Sandy Creek, 1 mile (1.6 km) east and 8 miles (13 km) north of Oak; 40°21′02″N 97°52′39″W | Oak | Removed ca. 2010 and replaced with driveway tubes. |
| 6 | Superior City Hall and Auditorium | Superior City Hall and Auditorium | March 12, 2012 (#12000107) | 450 N. Commercial; 40°01′15″N 98°04′11″W | Superior | 1937 building funded primarily by a Public Works Administration grant |
| 7 | Superior Downtown Historic District | Superior Downtown Historic District | January 21, 1994 (#93001405) | Roughly along Central and Commercial Aves. from 3rd to 5th Sts. and 3rd, 4th and 5th from Central to Commercial; 40°01′11″N 98°04′13″W | Superior | |

== See also ==
- List of National Historic Landmarks in Nebraska
- National Register of Historic Places listings in Nebraska
