= Sunday Times Rich List 1989 =

First annual survey of UK's richest residents

The Sunday Times Rich List 1989 is the 1st annual survey of the wealthiest people resident in the United Kingdom, published by The Sunday Times on 2 April 1989.

In 1989 a wealth of £30 million was needed to make the top 200, (approximately £76 million in today's value).

The list at the time reported Queen Elizabeth II as the wealthiest person in the United Kingdom, with a wealth of £5.2 billion, which included state assets that were not hers personally, (approximately £13.2 billion in today's value).

== Top 10 fortunes ==
1989		Name	Citizenship	Source of wealth
Rank	Net worth £ bn	Name	Citizenship	Source of wealth
1	£5.2	The Queen	United Kingdom	Landowner
2	£3.2	The Duke of Westminster	United Kingdom	Landowner
3	£1.97	Lord Sainsbury & family	United Kingdom	Retail
4	£1.9	Gad and Hans Rausing	Sweden	Packaging
5	£1.7	Sir John Moores	United Kingdom	Retail
5	£1.7	Garfield Weston	Canada	Retail
7	£1.2	John Paul Getty II	United Kingdom	Oil
7	£1.2	Lord Vestey & Edmund Vestey	United Kingdom	Food
9	£1	Octav Botnar	Romania	Cars
10	£0.75	Sir James Goldsmith	France & United Kingdom	Finance

== See also ==
- List of billionaires (2007)
