= Edmund Vestey =

Edmund Vestey may refer to:

- Sir Edmund Vestey, 1st Baronet (1866–1957), English businessman, co-founder of Vestey Brothers and the Blue Star Line
- Edmund Hoyle Vestey (1932–2007), his grandson, chairman of the Blue Star Line and Union International
