= Samuel Vestey =

Samuel Vestey may refer to:

- Samuel Vestey, 3rd Baron Vestey (1941–2021), British peer, landowner, and businessman
- Samuel Vestey, 2nd Baron Vestey (1882–1954), British noble
- Sam Vesty (born 1981), English rugby union player and coach
