= Evelene Brodstone =

American businesswoman

The Right Honourable The Baroness Vestey
- Born: August 1, 1875; Monroe, Wisconsin
- Died: May 23, 1941 (aged 65); London
- Other names: Evelene Brodstone, Evelyn Vestey, Lady Vestey
- Occupation: Business executive

Evelene Brodstone, later Evelyn Vestey, Lady Vestey (August 1, 1875 – May 23, 1941) was an American businesswoman known for being one of the highest paid woman executives of the 1920s. Beginning as a stenographer for the Vestey Cold Storage Company in Chicago, Illinois, she rose through the ranks to become the chief auditor and troubleshooter for Vestey Brothers. In 1924, she married William Vestey, 1st Baron Vestey.

== Early life and education ==
Evelene Brodstone was born on August 1, 1875, in Monroe, Wisconsin, to Norwegian immigrant parents Hans and Mathilde Emelie Brodstone. She had one sibling, her brother Lewis, who was three years older.

The family moved to Superior, Nebraska, when Brodstone was three years old. Two years later, Hans Brodstone died, leaving Mathilde Brodstone to raise two children. The family lived on a farm, and Brodstone's early and high school education was conducted in a one-room log cabin where students would attend barefoot.

Brodstone was a superb student, excelling at mathematics and working hard throughout the summer months on her schooling. In her childhood, she engaged in square dancing, swimming and fishing at a local millrace. She was also an avid cyclist, having won her first bicycle as a prize from the Western Pearl Baking Powder Company of Chicago. She graduated from high school at the age of 14.

Upon graduation, Brodstone enrolled in Elliott's Business College in Burlington, Iowa. After completing courses in stenography and accounting, she returned to Superior and worked for the Guthrie Brothers and at Henningsen Produce Company. She later returned to Elliot's Business College to take more courses.

== Vestey Brothers ==
In 1895, Brodstone moved to Chicago in search of work. There, she obtained a job as a stenographer with the Vestey Cold Storage Company, earning $12 a week. The company was owned by the Vestey Brothers of Liverpool; it had been founded at his father's behest by William Vestey in 1876, and had been run by his brother Edmund Vestey since 1882. Brodstone's competence and demeanor impressed Edmund Vestey, who made her his personal stenographer and raised her pay to $20 a week.

Brodstone rose rapidly through the ranks of the growing company, becoming auditor, then manager of Vestey Brothers' American branch, and finally travelling auditor for the entire Vestey firm, at an annual salary of $250,000. Her work took her to the interior of China; to the upper Orinoco River in Venezuela; to Russia, where her hotel was dynamited, killing all within, while she was visiting the Vestey plant; to Australia, where she purchased 6,000,000 acres (2,400,000 ha) for the company; and to many other parts of the world. When the manager of a Vestey plant in South Africa absconded with the company's funds, Brodstone followed him halfway around the world before catching him.

The Blue Star Line was founded by the Vestey family; at the time of World War I, its twelve vessels all had names starting with "Brod‑" after Brodstone, e.g. Brodholme, Brodland, Brodlea.

== Lady Vestey ==
In 1922, William Vestey was elevated to the peerage, as the first Baron Vestey. In 1923, his wife died; a year later, Lord Vestey married Brodstone, who at his behest changed her given name to "Evelyn".

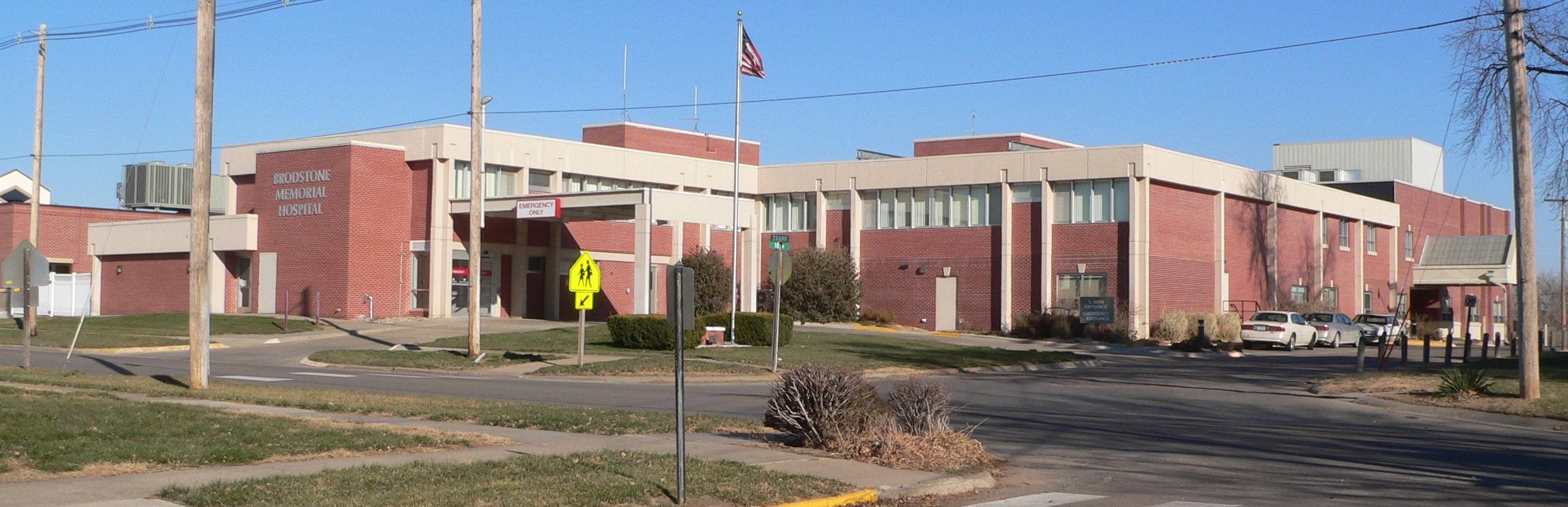
Brodstone Memorial Hospital in Superior

Lady Vestey retained her close connection to Superior, where her mother and brother lived until their deaths in 1924 and 1936 respectively. With Lewis Brodstone, she gave the city land and funds for a hospital in memory of their mother; the text of the dedicatory plaque was written by Willa Cather, who had known the Brodstones during her youth in Red Cloud, Nebraska. After Lewis's death, she gave Superior two blocks as a bird sanctuary and children's park in his memory. She sent Christmas gifts to the school children of the city, and contributed a large collection of relics of her early life, of her travels, and of her time in England to the Superior museum.

Lord Vestey died in 1940. On May 23, 1941, Lady Vestey died at her home in London. Her ashes were sent to Superior for interment, making her the only member of the British nobility who is buried in Nebraska.

== Legacy ==
In honor of Lady Vestey, Superior holds an annual Victorian Festival every Memorial Day weekend. The city bills itself as the "Victorian Capital of Nebraska".

== Related reading ==
- Tremain, Elizabeth J. (1992) Evelene: The Troubleshooter was a Lady (Foundation Books, 2nd edition) ISBN 0-934988-28-5.
