= Nelson Cemetery Walk =

Historic site in Nuckolls County, Nebraska, US

- U.S. National Register of Historic Places
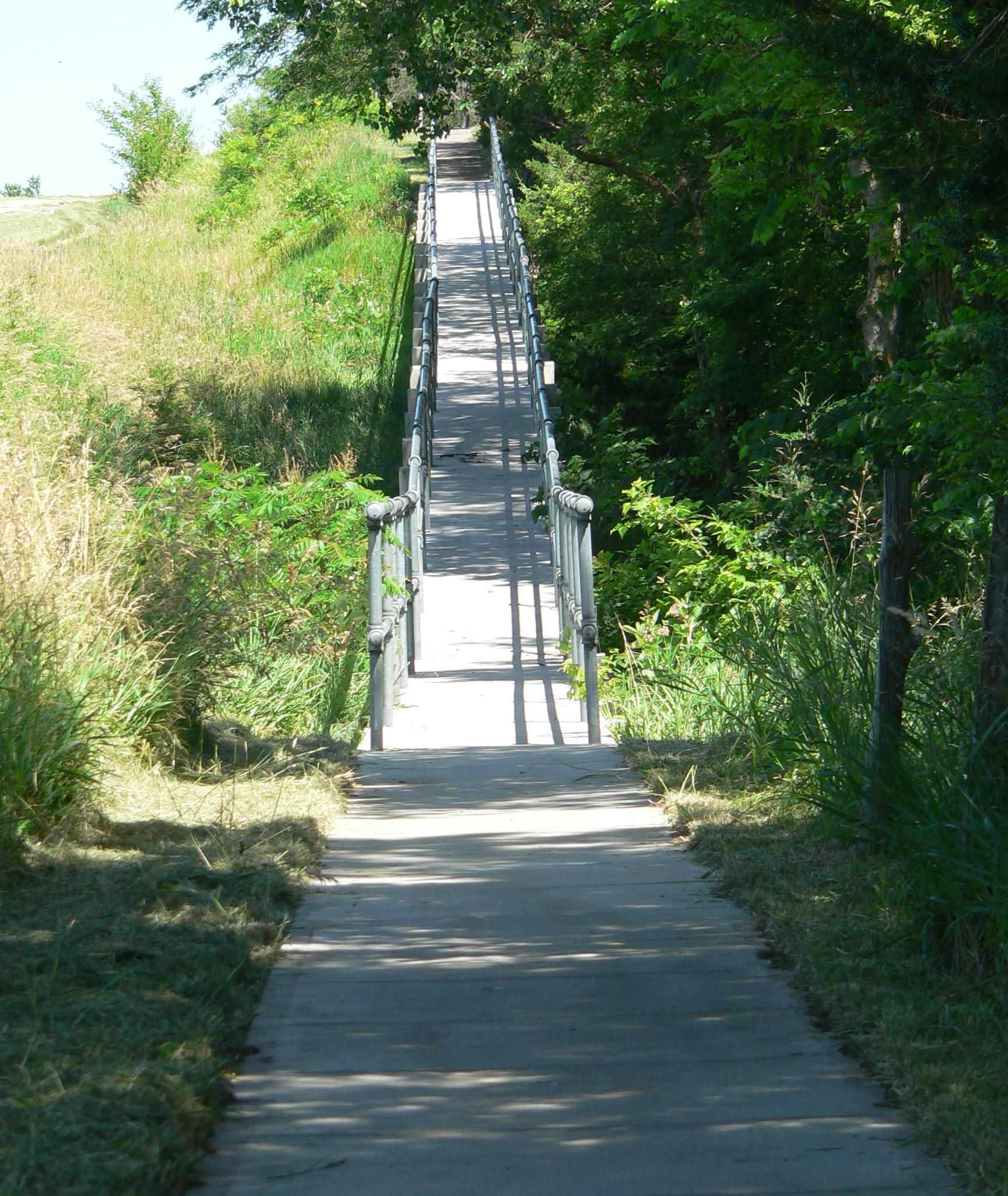
- The walk in 2010

- Location within Nebraska Location within the United States
- Nearest city: Nelson, Nebraska
- Coordinates: 40°12′20″N 98°04′39″W
- Area: less than one acre
- Built: 1912
- Built by: J.B. Goodrich
- Architect: A.W. McReynolds
- NRHP reference No.: 02001480
- Added to NRHP: December 5, 2002

The Nelson Cemetery Walk is a historic pedestrian walkway in Nelson, Nebraska. It was built in 1912 by J.B. Goodrich with fundraising from the local P.E.O. Sisterhood chapter, and designed by A.W. McReynolds. It spans a ravine which otherwise splits the community. It is 1,235 feet (376 m) long and 4 feet (1.2 m) wide. It is not a bridge per se, because it descends partway down into the ravine, but its surface is about 50 feet (15 m) above the lowest part of the ravine. It was originally unpaved. It has been listed on the National Register of Historic Places since December 5, 2002.
