= Nuckolls County Courthouse =

- U.S. National Register of Historic Places
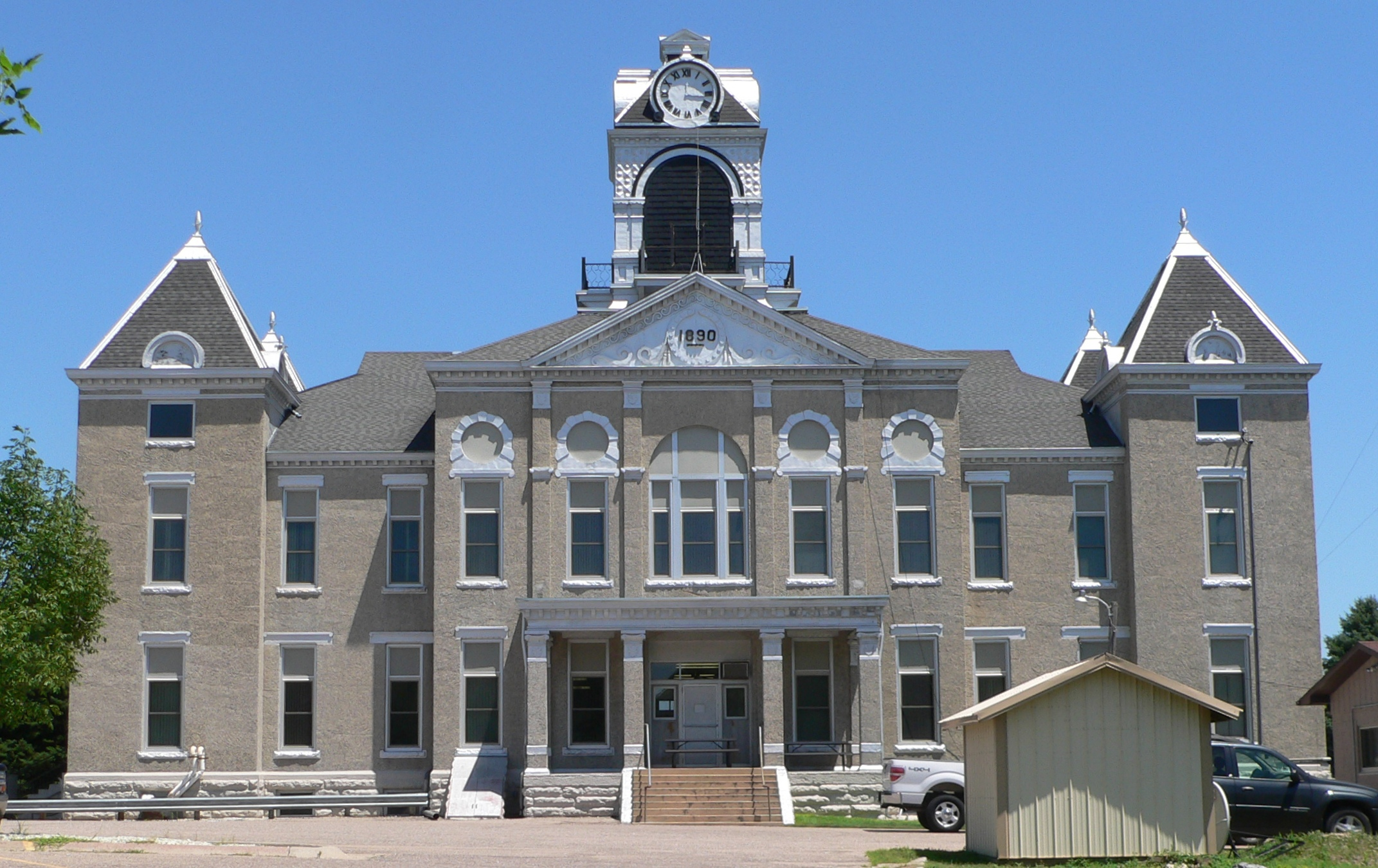
- The courthouse in 2010

- Location within Nebraska Location within the United States
- Location: 150 South Main Street, Nelson, Nebraska
- Coordinates: 40°12′14″N 98°04′04″W
- Area: 3.7 acres (1.5 ha)
- Built: 1890
- Architect: George E. McDonald
- Architectural style: Classical Revival
- MPS: County Courthouses of Nebraska MPS
- NRHP reference No.: 89002219
- Added to NRHP: January 10, 1990

The Nuckolls County Courthouse is a historic two-story building in Nelson, Nebraska, and the courthouse of Nuckolls County, Nebraska. The county court proceedings were held in two other buildings prior to its construction: in a courthouse built in 1873, and in the Nelson opera house built in 1887. The third building and current courthouse was built in 1890, and designed in the Classical Revival style by architect George E. McDonald. It has been listed on the National Register of Historic Places since January 10, 1990.
