= Cadams, Nebraska =

Unincorporated community in Nebraska, United States

- Unincorporated Community
- Location within Nebraska Location within the United States
- Coordinates: 40.1°N 98°W
- Country: United States
- State: Nebraska
- County: Nuckolls

Cadams is an unincorporated community in Nuckolls County, Nebraska, United States.

== History ==
Cadams had a post office between 1892 and 1940. The community was named for C. Adams, a banker from Superior, Nebraska.
