= Lawrence Opera House =

- U.S. National Register of Historic Places
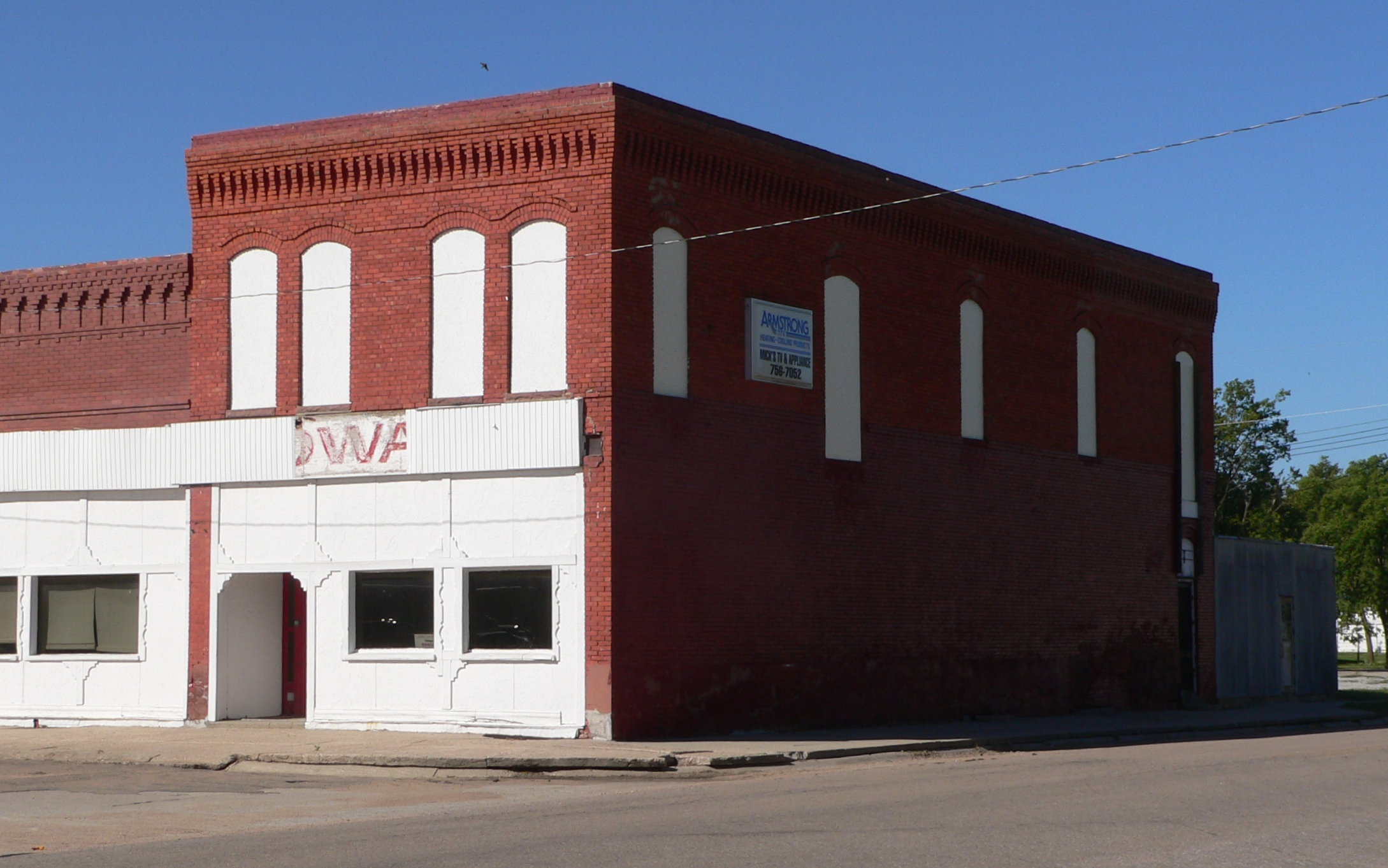
- The building in 2010

- Location within Nebraska Location within the United States
- Location: Second and Calvert Streets, Lawrence, Nebraska
- Coordinates: 40°17′31″N 98°15′36″W
- Area: less than one acre
- Built: 1901
- Architectural style: Two-part commercial block
- MPS: Opera House Buildings in Nebraska 1867-1917 MPS
- NRHP reference No.: 88000933
- Added to NRHP: September 28, 1988

The Lawrence Opera House is a historic two-story commercial building in Lawrence, Nebraska. It was built in 1901 and operated until around 1917 gradually declining due to the advent of Automobiles allowing for people to travel further faster. According to historian D. Layne Ehlers, "[t]his opera house is significant in the area of social history, because it gave Lawrence a neutral, nonaffiliated location for lodge meetings, suppers, and school entertainments." The building has been listed on the National Register of Historic Places since September 28, 1988.
