= Nora, Nebraska =

- Village
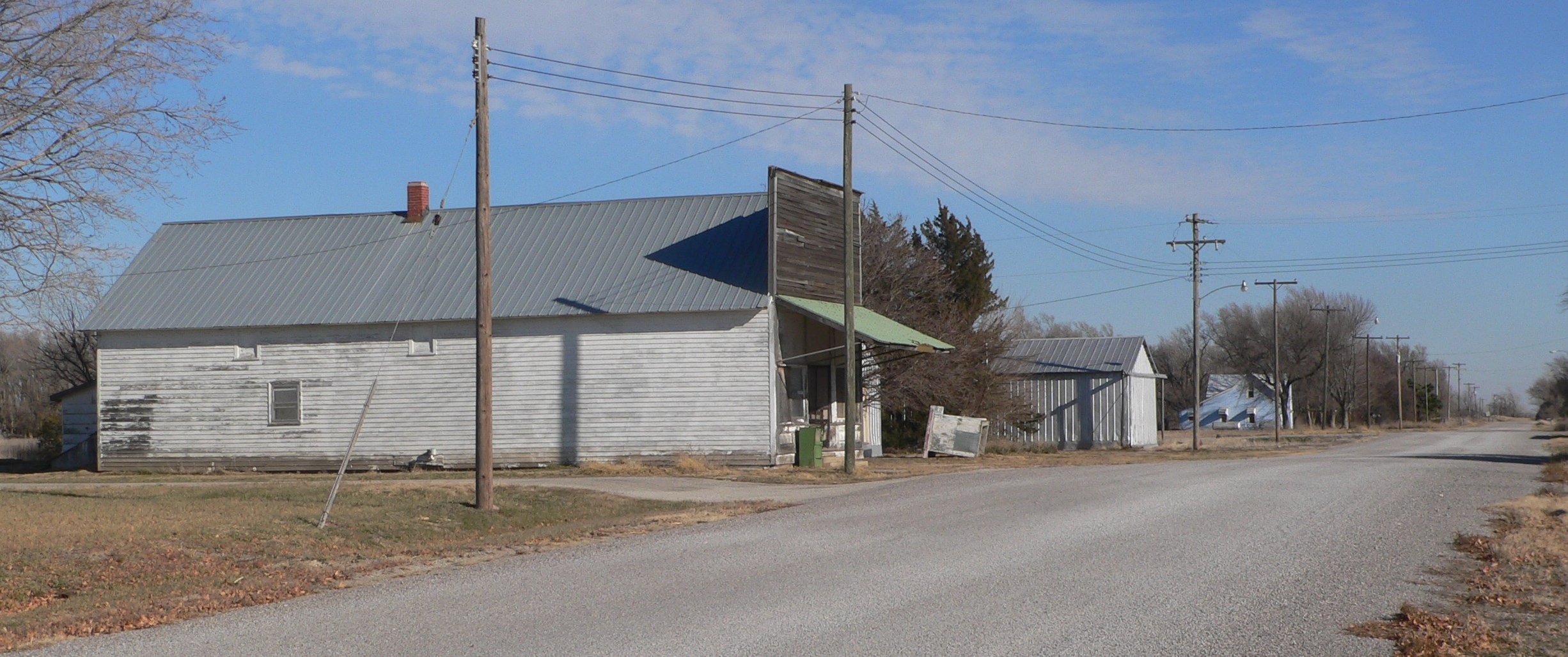
- Downtown Nora

- Location of Nora, Nebraska
- Coordinates: 40°09′51″N 97°58′26″W
- Country: United States
- State: Nebraska
- County: Nuckolls

Area
  - Total: 0.38 sq mi (0.98 km^{2})
  - Land: 0.38 sq mi (0.98 km^{2})
  - Water: 0 sq mi (0.00 km^{2})
- Elevation: 1,755 ft (535 m)

Population (2020)
  - Total: 21
  - Density: 55.2/sq mi (21.32/km^{2})
- Time zone: UTC-6 (Central (CST))
  - Summer (DST): UTC-5 (CDT)
- ZIP code: 68961
- Area code: 402
- FIPS code: 31-34545
- GNIS feature ID: 2399502

Nora is a village in Nuckolls County, Nebraska, United States. As of the 2020 census, Nora had a population of 21.

== History ==
Nora was laid out in 1887 when the railroad was extended to that point. After browsing a postal directory, the town's founder selected the name Nora, after Nora, Illinois.

== Geography ==
According to the United States Census Bureau, the village has a total area of 0.38 square miles (0.98 km^{2}), all land.

== Demographics ==
Historical population
Census	Pop.	Note	%±
1920	130		—
1930	157		20.8%
1940	119		−24.2%
1950	88		−26.1%
1960	60		−31.8%
1970	43		−28.3%
1980	24		−44.2%
1990	24		0.0%
2000	20		−16.7%
2010	21		5.0%
2020	21		0.0%
U.S. Decennial Census; 2012 Estimate

=== 2010 census ===
As of the census of 2010, there were 21 people, 10 households, and 5 families residing in the village. The population density was 55.3 inhabitants per square mile (21.4/km^{2}). There were 11 housing units at an average density of 28.9 per square mile (11.2/km^{2}). The racial makeup of the village was 81.0% White and 19.0% from other races. Hispanic or Latino of any race were 19.0% of the population.

There were 10 households, of which 20.0% had children under the age of 18 living with them, 40.0% were married couples living together, 10.0% had a female householder with no husband present, and 50.0% were non-families. 30.0% of all households were made up of individuals, and 10% had someone living alone who was 65 years of age or older. The average household size was 2.10 and the average family size was 2.80.

The median age in the village was 53.5 years. 14.3% of residents were under the age of 18; 4.8% were between the ages of 18 and 24; 23.8% were from 25 to 44; 47.6% were from 45 to 64; and 9.5% were 65 years of age or older. The gender makeup of the village was 42.9% male and 57.1% female.

=== 2000 census ===
As of the census of 2000, there were 20 people, 10 households, and 5 families residing in the village. The population density was 52.6 inhabitants per square mile (20.3/km^{2}). There were 10 housing units at an average density of 26.3 per square mile (10.2/km^{2}). The racial makeup of the village was 100.00% White.

There were 10 households, out of which 30.0% had children under the age of 18 living with them, 50.0% were married couples living together, and 50.0% were non-families. 50.0% of all households were made up of individuals, and 40.0% had someone living alone who was 65 years of age or older. The average household size was 2.00 and the average family size was 3.00.

In the village, the population was spread out, with 20.0% under the age of 18, 35.0% from 25 to 44, 25.0% from 45 to 64, and 20.0% who were 65 years of age or older. The median age was 38 years. For every 100 females, there were 66.7 males. For every 100 females age 18 and over, there were 60.0 males.

As of 2000 the median income for a household in the village was $12,250, and the median income for a family was $48,750. Males had a median income of $21,250 versus $28,750 for females. The per capita income for the village was $21,310. None of the population and none of the families were below the poverty line.

=== Notable people ===
- Katherine "Kathy" May Todd, first woman in the Oregon Dairy Industries Hall of Fame
