= Nuckolls County, Nebraska =

County in Nebraska, United States

- County
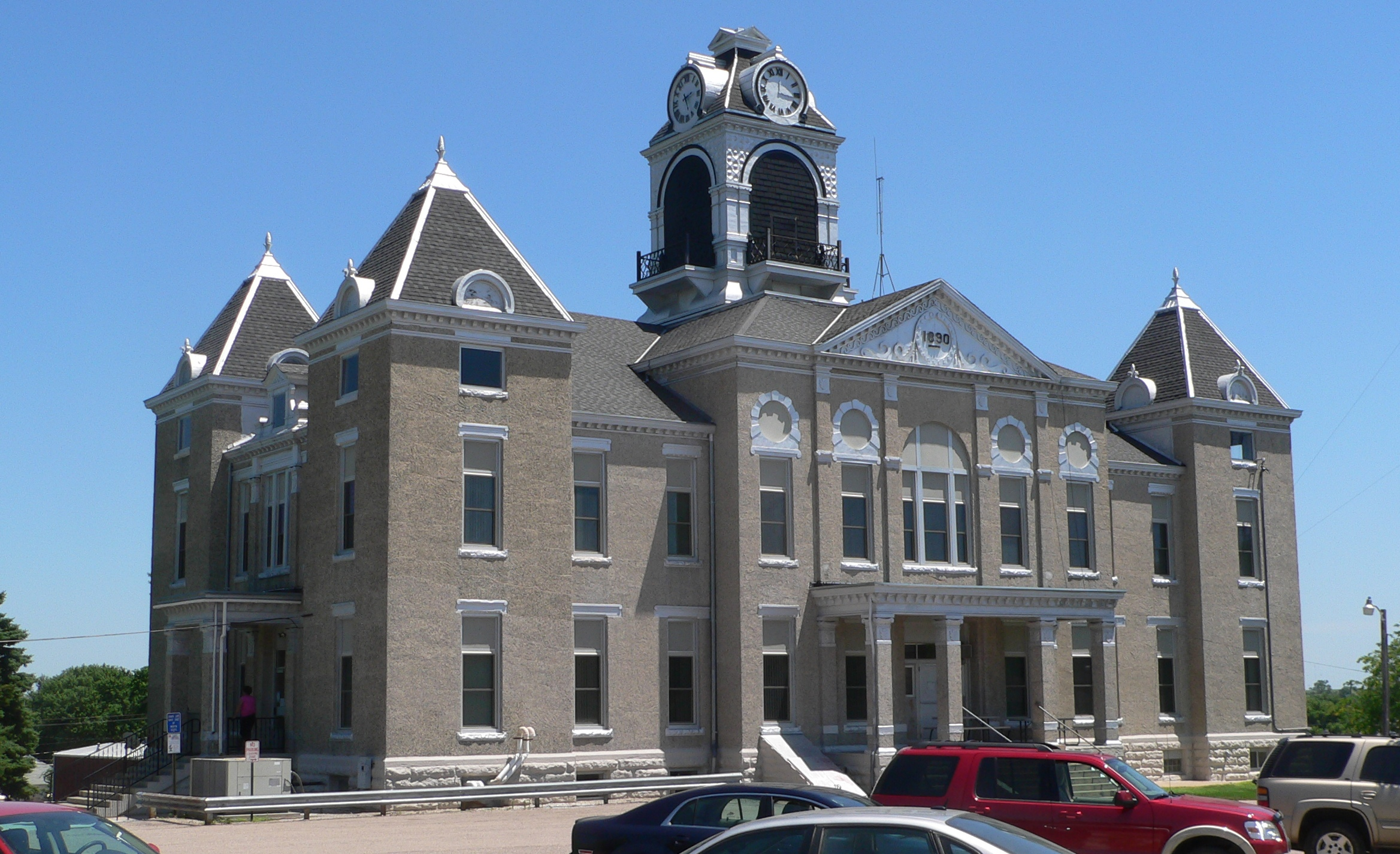
- Nuckolls County Courthouse in Nelson

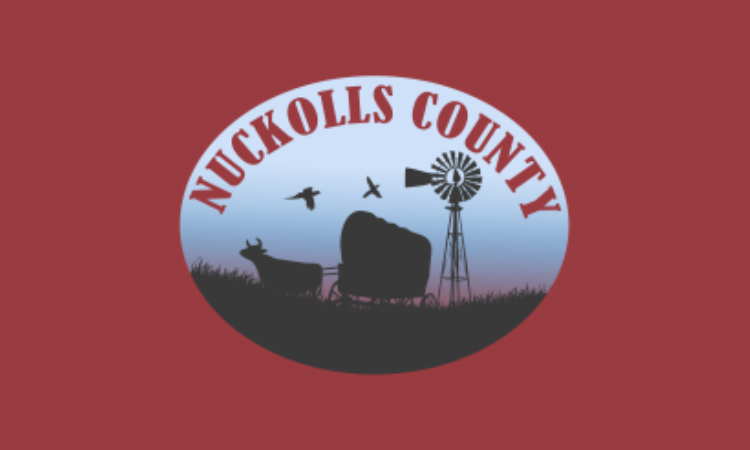
- Flag

- Location within the U.S. state of Nebraska
- Coordinates: 40°11′N 98°03′W
- Country: United States
- State: Nebraska
- Founded: 1860 (founded); 1871 (organized)
- Named for: Stephen Friel Nuckolls
- Seat: Nelson
- Largest city: Superior

Area
  - Total: 576 sq mi (1,490 km^{2})
  - Land: 575 sq mi (1,490 km^{2})
  - Water: 0.7 sq mi (1.8 km^{2}) 0.1%

Population (2020)
  - Total: 4,095
  - Estimate (2025): 4,100 ▲
  - Density: 7.43/sq mi (2.87/km^{2})
- Time zone: UTC−6 (Central)
  - Summer (DST): UTC−5 (CDT)
- Congressional district: 3rd
- Website: www.nuckollscounty.ne.gov

Nuckolls County is a county located in the U.S. state of Nebraska. As of the 2020 United States census, the population was 4,095. Its county seat is Nelson.

In the Nebraska license plate system, Nuckolls County is represented by the prefix 42 (it had the 42nd-largest number of vehicles registered in the county when the license plate system was established in 1922).

== History ==
=== 19th century ===
Nuckolls County was formed in 1860, and was organized in 1871. It was named after brothers Lafayette Nuckolls, a member of the first Nebraska territorial legislature, and Stephen Friel Nuckolls, a pioneering Nebraska settler, businessman and banker. Nuckolls was also a notorious slaveowner who was followed by national news in 1860 when he tracked down an enslaved person he owned, named Eliza Grayson. She had escaped from him via the Underground Railroad two years earlier. With the help of a professional kidnapper they attempted to remove the woman from Chicago, where she was found, only to be arrested by local law enforcement. Nuckolls and the enslaved woman were put in the Chicago jail, only for an abolitionist mob to free her and shuttle her away to Canada. Nuckolls went on to prominence and admiration in Nebraska after sympathizing with the Confederate states during the civil war.

In 1887, Atchison, Topeka and Santa Fe Railway built a branch line from Neva, Kansas (3 miles west of Strong City) to Superior, Nebraska. At some point, the rails were removed from Neva, KS to Lost Springs, KS, but the right-of-way has not been abandoned. As of 2020, the BNSF Line from Superior, NE to Lost Springs, KS was active and carrying rail traffic to and from Superior. This branch line was originally called "Strong City and Superior line" but later the name was shortened to the "Strong City line". In 1996, the Atchison, Topeka and Santa Fe Railway merged with Burlington Northern Railroad, renamed to the current BNSF Railway. Most locals still refer to this railroad as the "Santa Fe".

== Geography ==
Nuckolls County lies on the south line of Nebraska. Its south boundary line abuts the north boundary line of the state of Kansas. The Republican River flows southeastward through the SW corner of the county The upper county area is drained by two creeks, Elk Creek and Oxbow Creek, that flow northeastward to discharge into Crooked Creek, which then flows eastward into adjacent Thayer County. The Nuckolls County terrain consists of vegetation-covered rolling hills, sloped to the east. A portion of the area is dedicated to agriculture, especially in the northeast corner.

Nuckolls county has a total area of 576 square miles (1,490 km^{2}), of which 575 square miles (1,490 km^{2}) is land and 0.7 square miles (1.8 km^{2}) (0.1%) is water.

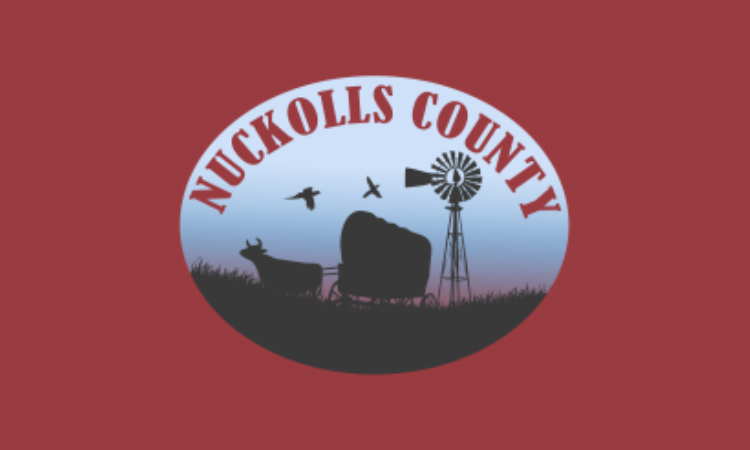
Flag of Nuckolls County, obtained from their website. Also visible from CW flags

=== Major highways ===
- U.S. Highway 136
- Nebraska Highway 4
- Nebraska Highway 8
- Nebraska Highway 14

=== Adjacent counties ===
- Clay County - north
- Fillmore County - northeast
- Thayer County - east
- Republic County, Kansas - southeast
- Jewell County, Kansas - southwest
- Webster County - west

=== Protected areas ===
- Smartweed Marsh State Wildlife Management Area

== Demographics ==
Historical population
Census	Pop.	Note	%±
1860	22		—
1870	8		−63.6%
1880	4,235		52,837.5%
1890	11,417		169.6%
1900	12,414		8.7%
1910	13,019		4.9%
1920	13,236		1.7%
1930	12,629		−4.6%
1940	12,781		1.2%
1950	10,973		−14.1%
1960	8,217		−25.1%
1970	7,404		−9.9%
1980	6,726		−9.2%
1990	7,586		12.8%
2000	5,057		−33.3%
2010	4,500		−11.0%
2020	4,095		−9.0%
2025 (est.)	4,100	▲	0.1%
US Decennial Census; 1790-1960 1900-1990; 1990-2000 2010-2013

=== 2020 census ===
As of the 2020 census, the county had a population of 4,095. The median age was 50.0 years. 19.4% of residents were under the age of 18 and 27.7% of residents were 65 years of age or older. For every 100 females there were 99.3 males, and for every 100 females age 18 and over there were 98.9 males age 18 and over.

The racial makeup of the county was 94.3% White, 0.1% Black or African American, 0.1% American Indian and Alaska Native, 0.1% Asian, 0.0% Native Hawaiian and Pacific Islander, 1.2% from some other race, and 4.2% from two or more races. Hispanic or Latino residents of any race comprised 2.9% of the population.

0.0% of residents lived in urban areas, while 100.0% lived in rural areas.

There were 1,894 households in the county, of which 23.1% had children under the age of 18 living with them and 23.5% had a female householder with no spouse or partner present. About 34.9% of all households were made up of individuals and 19.1% had someone living alone who was 65 years of age or older.

There were 2,216 housing units, of which 14.5% were vacant. Among occupied housing units, 78.6% were owner-occupied and 21.4% were renter-occupied. The homeowner vacancy rate was 2.1% and the rental vacancy rate was 9.0%.

=== 2000 census ===
As of the 2000 United States census, there were 5,057 people, 2,218 households, and 1,443 families in the county. The population density was 9 people per square mile (3.5 people/km^{2}). There were 2,530 housing units at an average density of 4 units per square mile (1.5/km^{2}). The racial makeup of the county was 98.91% White, 0.02% Black or African American, 0.06% Native American, 0.16% Asian, 0.53% from other races, and 0.32% from two or more races. 1.01% of the population were Hispanic or Latino of any race.

There were 2,218 households, out of which 26.50% had children under the age of 18 living with them, 58.80% were married couples living together, 4.60% had a female householder with no husband present, and 34.90% were non-families. 32.30% of all households were made up of individuals, and 18.00% had someone living alone who was 65 years of age or older. The average household size was 2.26 and the average family size was 2.86.

The county population contained 23.40% under the age of 18, 5.40% from 18 to 24, 22.50% from 25 to 44, 24.30% from 45 to 64, and 24.40% who were 65 years of age or older. The median age was 44 years. For every 100 females there were 92.50 males. For every 100 females age 18 and over, there were 91.90 males.

The median income for a household in the county was $28,958, and the median income for a family was $35,018. Males had a median income of $24,533 versus $17,806 for females. The per capita income for the county was $15,608. About 6.50% of families and 11.20% of the population were below the poverty line, including 16.70% of those under age 18 and 8.90% of those age 65 or over.

== Communities ==
=== Cities ===
- Nelson (county seat)
- Superior

=== Villages ===
- Hardy
- Lawrence
- Nora
- Oak
- Ruskin

=== Unincorporated communities ===
- Angus
- Bostwick
- Cadams

== Politics ==
Nuckolls County voters are reliably Republican. In only one national election since 1936 has the county selected the Democratic Party candidate.

United States presidential election results for Nuckolls County, Nebraska
Year	Republican		Democratic		Third party(ies)	
Year	No.	%	No.	%	No.	%
1900	1,471	49.08%	1,480	49.38%	46	1.53%
1904	1,615	60.99%	585	22.09%	448	16.92%
1908	1,519	49.19%	1,523	49.32%	46	1.49%
1912	738	24.46%	1,312	43.49%	967	32.05%
1916	1,411	43.51%	1,732	53.41%	100	3.08%
1920	2,637	64.07%	1,337	32.48%	142	3.45%
1924	2,595	54.02%	1,596	33.22%	613	12.76%
1928	3,299	65.63%	1,684	33.50%	44	0.88%
1932	1,812	33.98%	3,420	64.13%	101	1.89%
1936	2,317	44.81%	2,778	53.72%	76	1.47%
1940	3,017	61.70%	1,873	38.30%	0	0.00%
1944	2,685	62.56%	1,607	37.44%	0	0.00%
1948	2,036	52.71%	1,827	47.29%	0	0.00%
1952	3,251	70.34%	1,371	29.66%	0	0.00%
1956	2,672	64.28%	1,485	35.72%	0	0.00%
1960	2,441	60.86%	1,570	39.14%	0	0.00%
1964	1,546	41.48%	2,181	58.52%	0	0.00%
1968	1,894	59.32%	1,127	35.30%	172	5.39%
1972	2,089	67.65%	999	32.35%	0	0.00%
1976	1,753	54.37%	1,424	44.17%	47	1.46%
1980	2,180	66.42%	899	27.39%	203	6.19%
1984	2,132	68.82%	947	30.57%	19	0.61%
1988	1,750	60.53%	1,114	38.53%	27	0.93%
1992	1,277	43.16%	834	28.19%	848	28.66%
1996	1,383	56.01%	757	30.66%	329	13.33%
2000	1,701	69.63%	644	26.36%	98	4.01%
2004	1,884	76.24%	541	21.89%	46	1.86%
2008	1,498	67.45%	657	29.58%	66	2.97%
2012	1,574	71.84%	568	25.92%	49	2.24%
2016	1,726	78.28%	353	16.01%	126	5.71%
2020	1,857	80.56%	409	17.74%	39	1.69%
2024	1,836	81.17%	399	17.64%	27	1.19%

== See also ==
- National Register of Historic Places listings in Nuckolls County, Nebraska
