= Baron Vestey =

Title in the Peerage of the UK, created in 1922

Baron Vestey, of Kingswood in the County of Surrey, is a title in the Peerage of the United Kingdom. It was created in 1922 for the shipping magnate Sir William Vestey, 1st Baronet. He was the co-founder of the Blue Star Line. Vestey had already been created a baronet, of Bessémer House in the Metropolitan Borough of Camberwell, in 1913.

As of 2021, the titles are held by the fourth Baron, who succeeded his father in 2021 and is the eldest grandson of the Hon. William Vestey (who was killed in action in Italy during the Second World War in 1944), the only son of the second Baron. The current holder's father, the 3rd Baron Vestey, served as Master of the Horse from 1999 to 2018.

Sir Edmund Vestey, 1st Baronet, co-founder of the Blue Star Line, was the younger brother of the first Baron Vestey.

The family seat is Stowell Park, in the Cotswold Hills, Gloucestershire.

== Barons Vestey ==
- William Vestey, 1st Baron Vestey (1859–1940)
- Samuel Vestey, 2nd Baron Vestey (1882–1954)
  - Captain Hon. William Howarth Vestey (1912–1944)
- Samuel George Armstrong Vestey, 3rd Baron Vestey (1941–2021)
- William Guy Vestey, 4th Baron Vestey (born 1983)

The heir apparent is the present holder's son, the Hon. Samuel Oscar Mark Vestey (born 2018).

== See also ==
- Vestey baronets, of Shirley
- Vestey Group
