= Edmund Hoyle Vestey =

Edmund Vestey (19 June 1932 – 23 November 2007) was a member of the Vestey family that made its fortune in the meat trade, their activities ranging from retail outlets, shipping lines to processing companies in South America and cattle stations in Australia. He was the third generation to head the family business, now Vestey Holdings, and was thought to have a personal wealth of £700 million.

Vestey was the grandson of Sir Edmund Vestey who founded the Union Cold Storage Company in Liverpool in 1897 with his brother, Sir William (later Baron) Vestey, which later became a family business with 23,000 employees and 250,000 head of cattle on several continents, thought to have been worth nearly £2 billion.

Vestey was educated at Eton College, Berkshire, England, commissioned into the 2nd Dragoon Guards (Queen's Bays) in 1951 and served as an officer in the City of London Yeomanry, a regiment of the British Territorial Army. On leaving the regular army, Vestey joined the family business and became chairman of the Blue Star shipping line in 1971, holding that post for 25 years. He was president of the General Council of British Shipping in 1981–82. He was head of the Vestey's main London operating company, Union International, until 1991 and a director of the Vestey Group from 1993 to 2000.

He met his wife, Anne Scoones, in New Zealand where her father, General Sir Geoffry Scoones, was British high commissioner. They married in 1960 and had four sons. He owned the Thurlow estate in Suffolk, where he was for many years the Master of Foxhounds of the Thurlow Hunt. He also owned a sporting estate in Sutherland and farmland in the Borders. He was High Sheriff of Essex in 1977 and deputy lieutenant of Essex in 1978 and of Suffolk in 1991.

As of 2020, their third son George is CEO of Vestey Holdings (since 2010) and their fourth son Robin is Non-Executive Chairman of Vestey Holdings (since 2013).

== See also ==
- Vestey Group
- Vestey baronets
- William Vestey, 1st Baron Vestey
- Samuel Vestey, 3rd Baron Vestey
