= Angus, Nebraska =

Unincorporated hamlet in Nebraska, U.S.

Coordinates: 40°16′56″N 97°58′46″W

Angus is an unincorporated community in Nuckolls County, Nebraska, United States, located approximately seven miles south of Edgar. A sod house was built there in 1967 to celebrate the town's centennial.

The community was named after J. B. Angus, a railroad man.

== History ==
The area in the early 1900s was known for the local car company by Charles Marion Fuller, known as "Angus Automobile Company". Over 600 cars were produced between the fall of 1907 and the Spring of 1909, with dealerships reaching as far as the city of Denver.

Angus, from the early 1920's to the later 1940's, had the first cement swimming pool in Nuckrolls County, and was a town with a significant local economy.

In 1970, all eligible voters decided to unanimously vote to disincorporate. The post office closed on July 18, 1975.
