= Bostwick, Nebraska =

Unincorporated community in Nebraska, United States

- Unincorporated Community
- Location within Nebraska Location within the United States
- Coordinates: 40°N 98.2°W
- Country: United States
- State: Nebraska
- County: Nuckolls

Bostwick is an unincorporated community in Nuckolls County, Nebraska, United States.

== History ==
A post office was established at Bostwick in 1885, and remained in operation until it was discontinued in 1969. Bostwick was named after either a settler or railroad official.
