= Wallace Warren and Lillian Genevieve Bradshaw Kendall House =

Historic house in Nebraska, United States

- U.S. National Register of Historic Places
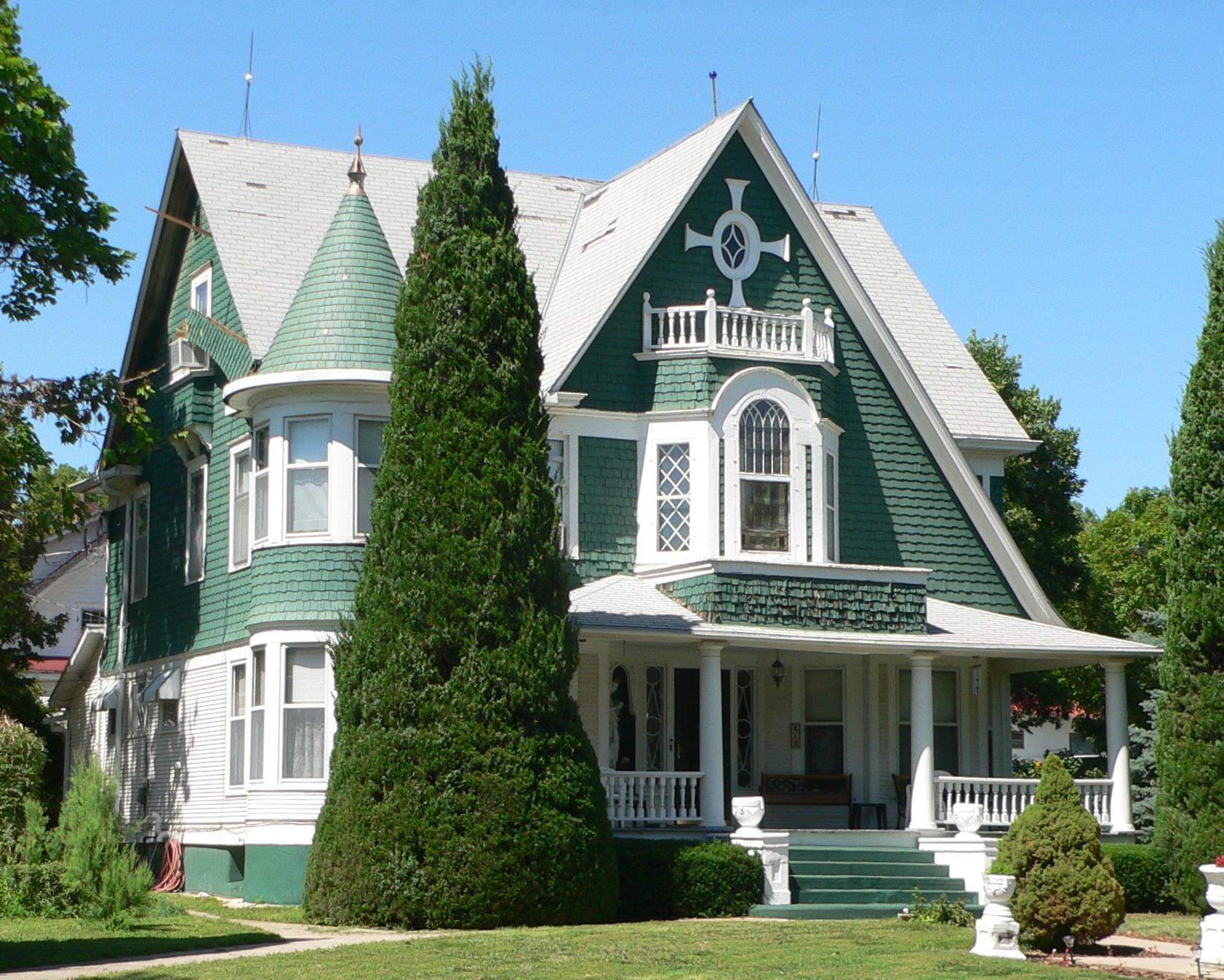

- Location within Nebraska Location within the United States
- Location: 412 E. Seventh St., Superior, Nebraska
- Coordinates: 40°1′24″N 98°4′0″W
- Area: less than one acre
- Built: 1898
- Architectural style: Shingle Style
- NRHP reference No.: 93001402
- Added to NRHP: December 10, 1993

The Wallace Warren and Lillian Genevieve Bradshaw Kendall House, at 412 E. Seventh St. in Superior, Nebraska, is a historic, prominent Shingle Style house built in 1898. It is a large two-story building that, when built, was one of the largest houses in Superior. It has a prominent location in Superior, occupying half of a block and hence having streets on three sides. The house has a round two-story tower with a conical roof, and a Palladian window, and many other interesting details outside and inside. It is primarily of Shingle style, but that style itself can incorporate Queen Anne style architecture in the United States elements, as this house does (in the round tower, for example), and Colonial Revival architecture elements, as in this house's use of columns and the Palladian window. Expressing the Shingle style per se is the shingle cladding of its second floor exterior.

It was listed on the National Register of Historic Places in 1993.
