= Vestey baronets =

Baronetcy in the Baronetage of the United Kingdom

There have been two baronetcies created for members of the Vestey family, both in the Baronetage of the United Kingdom. Both creations are extant as of 2010.

The Vestey Baronetcy, of Bessemer House, was created in the Baronetage of the United Kingdom on 21 June 1913 for William Vestey. In 1921 he was raised to the peerage as Baron Vestey (see this title for more information).

The Vestey Baronetcy, of Shirley in the County of Surrey, was created in the Baronetage of the United Kingdom on 27 June 1921 for Edmund Vestey. He was the younger brother of the first Baronet of the 1913 creation and the co-founder of the shipping line the Blue Star Line. As of 2010 the title is held by his grandson, the third Baronet, who succeeded his father in 2005.

== Vestey baronets, of Bessemer House (1913) ==
- see Baron Vestey

== Vestey baronets, of Shirley (1921) ==
- Sir Edmund Hoyle Vestey, 1st Baronet (1866–1953)
- Sir (John) Derek Vestey, 2nd Baronet (1914–2005)
- Sir Paul Edmund Vestey, 3rd Baronet (born 1944)

The heir presumptive is the present holder's cousin Dr. James Patrick Vestey (born 1954).

Coat of arms of Vestey baronets
Crest In front of a springbok’s head Proper three mullets Argent. Escutcheon Argent on a fess between two flaunches Gules each charged with a cross throughout of the field three roses also of the field. Motto E Labore Stabilitas

== See also ==
- Vestey Holdings
