= Samuel Vestey, 3rd Baron Vestey =

British peer (1941–2021)

The Right Honourable The Lord Vestey GCVO GCStJ DL
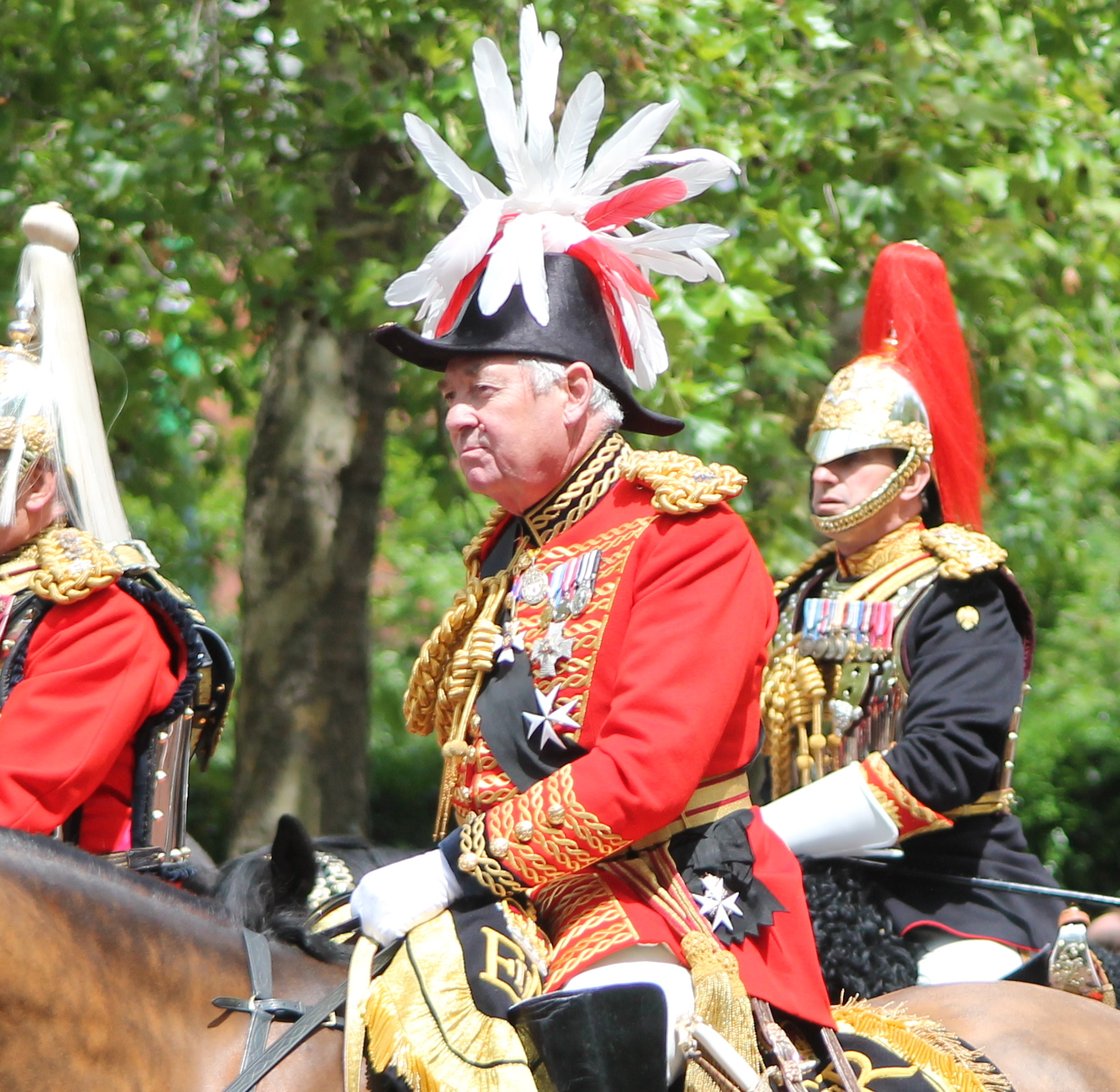
- Lord Vestey in 2012, riding to the Queen's Birthday Parade as Master of the Horse

Member of the House of Lords
- Lord Temporal
- In office 4 May 1954 – 11 November 1999 as a hereditary peer
- Preceded by: The 2nd Baron Vestey
- Succeeded by: Seat abolished (Note: Pursuant to the House of Lords Act 1999.)

Master of the Horse
- In office 1 January 1999 – 31 December 2018
- Monarch: Elizabeth II
- Preceded by: The Lord Somerleyton
- Succeeded by: The Lord de Mauley

Personal details
- Born: Samuel George Armstrong Vestey; 19 March 1941
- Died: 4 February 2021 (aged 79)
- Spouses: Kathryn Eccles (m. 1970; div. 1981) Celia Knight (m. 1981; died 2020)
- Children: 5
- Education: Sandhurst
- Occupation: Chairman, Vestey Group

Samuel George Armstrong Vestey, 3rd Baron Vestey (19 March 1941 – 4 February 2021), was a British hereditary peer, landowner, and businessman. He served as Master of the Horse to Queen Elizabeth II from 1999 to 2018.

== Early life and education ==
Vestey was born on 19 March 1941, the son of Captain The Hon. William Howarth Vestey, a Scots Guards officer who was killed in action during World War II in 1944, and Pamela Vestey (née Armstrong). On his mother's side, he was a great-grandson of Australian opera singer Dame Nellie Melba. He was educated at Eton College before attending the Royal Military Academy Sandhurst and serving as a lieutenant in the Scots Guards.

== Business career ==
Vestey was the chairman of the Meat Training Council from 1991 to 1995, before becoming chairman of the Vestey Group (now Vestey Holdings) in 1995. He was also a liveryman of the Worshipful Company of Butchers. In 1980, a Sunday Times investigation revealed that he and his cousin, Edmund Hoyle Vestey, were found to have paid just £10 in tax on the £2.3m profit made by the family's Dewhurst chain.

=== Wave Hill walk-off ===
Through his family company, Vestey was associated with Wave Hill Station during the Wave Hill walk-off, which began in 1966. Around 200 Gurindji workers and their families walked off the station after negotiations with its owners broke down over the non-payment of wages and reliance on rations, later expanding their demands to include the return of traditional lands.

The dispute later became a landmark event in the Indigenous Australian land rights movement, contributing to the passage of the Aboriginal Land Rights Act 1976 and shaping subsequent debates over Indigenous land ownership and native title.

The strike and Vestey's role in it were referenced in Ted Egan's song "Gurindji Blues", written in 1969 with Vincent Lingiari, and later popularised in the 1991 song "From Little Things Big Things Grow" by Paul Kelly and Kev Carmody. It also appears in Irish folk musician Damien Dempsey's song "Wave Hill Walk Off", from his 2016 album No Force on Earth.

== Public service ==
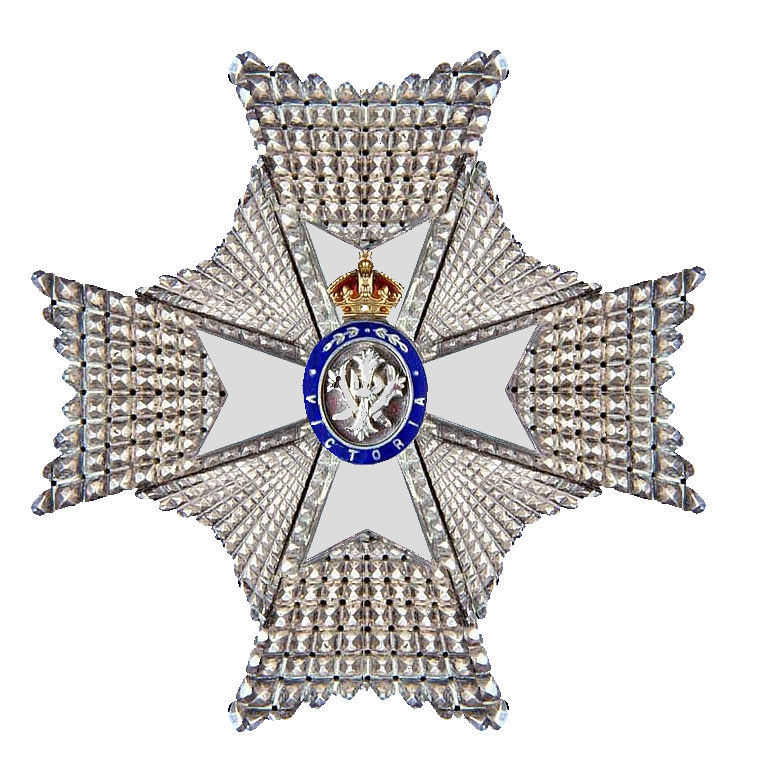
KCVO insignia

In 1954, Vestey succeeded his grandfather in the barony at the age of thirteen. His family seat is Stowell Park Estate in Gloucestershire, where his father is buried.

He was Chancellor (1988–1991) and then Lord Prior (1991–2002) of the Most Venerable Order of the Hospital of St John of Jerusalem, having been appointed Bailiff Grand Cross (GCStJ) in 1987. He became a Deputy Lieutenant of Gloucestershire in 1982.

From 1999 to 2018, Vestey served as Master of the Horse to the Sovereign of the United Kingdom, Queen Elizabeth II, who appointed him Knight Commander of the Royal Victorian Order (KCVO) in the 2009 Birthday Honours.

The Queen promoted Vestey to Knight Grand Cross of the Royal Victorian Order (GCVO) in December 2018, on the occasion of him relinquishing his appointment as Master of the Horse. He was appointed as a permanent Lord-in-waiting to the Queen in August 2019.

== Personal life ==
Vestey married Kathryn Eccles on 11 September 1970, and they were divorced in 1981. They have two daughters:

- The Honourable Saffron Alexandra Vestey (27 August 1971). She married Matthew Charles Idiens and they were divorced in 2001. They have two children. She married Charles Foster in 2008.
- The Honourable Flora Grace Vestey (22 September 1978). She married Laurence J. Kilby and they were divorced in 2010. She married James Hall in 2011.

He married Celia Elizabeth Knight on 22 December 1981. Celia Vestey was a godmother of the Duke of Sussex. They have three children:

- William Vestey, 4th Baron Vestey (27 August 1983). He married Violet Gweneth Henderson on 29 September 2012. They have two children.
- The Honourable Arthur George Vestey (1985). He married Hon. Martha Beaumont in June 2015. They have three children.
- The Honourable Mary Henrietta Vestey (1992). She married Edward Cookson in May 2019.

His elder son, William, served as a Page of Honour to Queen Elizabeth II from 1995 to 1998. He was a second cousin once removed of the socialite Caroline Stanbury.

The Vestey family's combined wealth (Lord Vestey with his cousin, Edmund Hoyle Vestey) amounts to approximately £1.2 billion, according to the Sunday Times Rich List 2013.

== Honours ==

- Knight Grand Cross of the Royal Victorian Order
- Baronet, 3rd Baronet Vestey of Bessémer House
- Grand Bailiff of the Order of St John
- Queen Elizabeth II Golden Jubilee Medal
- Queen Elizabeth II Diamond Jubilee Medal
- Service Medal of the Order of St John

== Arms ==
Coat of arms of Samuel Vestey, 3rd Baron Vestey

Coronet
Crest
In front of a Springbok's Head couped at the neck Proper three Mullets fesswise Azure
Escutcheon
Azure in base barry wavy of four Argent and of the First an Iceberg issuant Proper on a Chief of the Second three Eggs also Proper
Supporters
Dexter: a Sheep Proper; Sinister: a Bull Argent
Motto
"E Labore Stabilitas" (Out of hard work comes stability)
Orders
The Royal Victorian Order circlet:
VICTORIA
The Badge of the Order of St John:
Maltese Cross.

== Notes ==
Peerage of the United Kingdom
Preceded by Samuel Vestey	Baron Vestey; 1954–2021; Member of the House of Lords (1954–1999)	Succeeded by William Vestey
Baronetage of the United Kingdom
Preceded by Samuel Vestey	Baronet of Bessemer House; 1954–2021	Succeeded by William Vestey
Court offices
Preceded by The Lord Somerleyton	Master of the Horse; 1999–2018	Succeeded by The Lord de Mauley
Other offices
Preceded by The Lord Grey of Naunton	Lord Prior of St John; 1991–2002	Succeeded by Colonel Eric Barry
