= Vestey's Meatworks =

Coordinates: 12°26′20″S 130°50′02″E

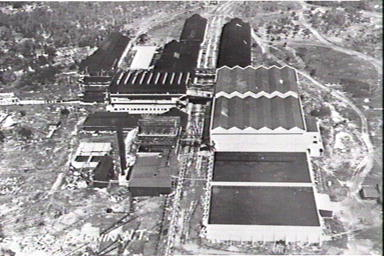
Aerial photograph of the meatworks in the 1930s

Vestey's Meatworks, officially the North Australia Meat Company, was a slaughterhouse in Darwin, Northern Territory, Australia, built by Vestey Brothers between 1914 and 1917. Never profitable, it operated for three years before the company abandoned the venture in the aftermath of the Darwin rebellion. Most of the facility was demolished in 1957, but two large water tanks remain standing today, on what is now the site of the Darwin High School on Bullocky Point in the suburb of The Gardens. The beach to the north of Bullocky Point is called Vestey's beach as a result of the meatworks.

== Construction ==
Construction of a meatworks began at Bullocky Point in 1914. It was completed in 1917 for a total cost of £1 million. Construction employed 500 or more men at the time.

In mid-November 1917, construction started on two water tanks due to the insufficient amount of bore water available on the site. Of the six bores onsite only four worked, and they were not producing enough to meet the demands of the meatworks and fill the giant tank, which had a capacity of almost 5 million gallons (18.92 million litres). On 16 February 1918, the tanks were finished and half full of water. When full both tanks could hold 5 million gallons combined. The tank displays considerable technical innovation and achievement, with the sand and gravel being crushed from rock on site. It is amongst the earliest substantial uses of reinforced concrete in the Northern Territory; it is one of the largest above ground concrete tanks built before the end of World War I, and is of a distinctive rectangular shape

A section of the workforce was also involved at this time in making bricks for the mess and canteen. The clay for the bricks came from an area between the Fannie Bay Gaol and the former Golf Links. It travelled down a light tramway, following the contours of the land. The kiln was situated in an area that is now used by Darwin Sailing club as a ‘hard stand’ for yachts. The diggings left a series of little lagoons, which is now Lake Alexander. The brickworks had been established in the 1870s by David Daniels to provide bricks for the Government Stamp Batteries on the gold fields.

The walls of the freezer chiller building were insulated with pumice.

== Operation ==
The meatworks had a capacity to process 55 head a day, with a freezer capacity of 6,000 t, the largest in Australia at the time.

The meatworks only operated for three seasons. In April 1917, killing commenced for a 14-week season. and processed nearly 18,911 cattle, the majority coming from Vestey's properties. The first shipment of frozen meat dispatched on 13 December 1917. About 460 men were employed and 1,680 cattle were being processed each week.

The 1918 season processed 29,000 cattle, 500 beasts could be killed and chilled, 500 carcases frozen and 200 canned a day, the majority from Vestey's properties.

The 1919 season was a short operating season and 21,866 head were processed before union disputes caused problems, which in part led to the Darwin Rebellion.

In three years of operation, the processed meat was valued at £1,029,271.

== Closure and abandonment ==
The meat works were closed on 17 March 1920. Vestey's blamed the labour indiscipline and poor quality of local cattle.

On 8 July 1923, a fire destroyed the three storey men's accommodation block and a couple of adjoining buildings.

In 1925, the meat works opened briefly to operate as a boiling down works. A total of 9,600 head were turned into tallow but Vestey's claimed a loss on operations.

With its closure, more than three quarters of the population found itself unemployed. As families moved away from Darwin in search of work, the Parap School (which had been opened in 1917) was closed, and as the number of secondary students dropped from 125 to 15 in 1925, the High School ceased to offer secondary education.

During the period 1925 to 1939, locals used to surreptitiously use the water tanks as a swimming facility.

=== Second World War ===
The abandoned Vestey's meatworks was used by the Darwin Mobile Force as their barracks from March 1939 until August 1940.

In 1942, with the Japanese air force on the verge of reaching Australia, military authorities feared the tank would give invaders a reliable water supply and allow them to get further inland. A local plumber, George Parker, was charged with blowing up the tank in the event of an invasion. He was also given two cyanide tablets to take in case of capture, and it is understood that when the bombing of Darwin began on 19 February 1942, he was actually at the tanks with his charges set and ready to go.

During the Second World War it was used by the military to billet men and store materials.

On 26 July 1942, at 9:15 pm the meatworks site was bombed by the Japanese and suffered minor damage. It was again bombed on 24 August 1942. In 1943, it was bombed once more on 28 June.

=== Demolition ===
In 1956, the facility was demolished with the exception of the water tanks. In 1962, construction of Darwin High School began on the site and was occupied on 3 October 1963.

== Current ==
The only remnants of the Vestey's meatworks are the two adjoining water tanks. One of which (the eastern one) had a roof put on it and was turned into a gymnasium for the high school and was opened in 1987. The tank had its official opening on 9 September 1987, but was well in use both by the school and the community from the day the workmen finished in 1987. The new-look tank was a gymnasium for the school, but because it was now the biggest indoor venue in Darwin, it quickly became popular for all kinds of social occasions such as gala balls. It was listed as Vestey's Tank on the Northern Territory Heritage Register on 29 July 2006. The western tank was turned into a sheltered grassed court yard.
