= William Vestey, 1st Baron Vestey =

British businessman (1859–1940), co-founder of Vestey Brothers, now Vestey Group

The Right Honourable The Lord Vestey
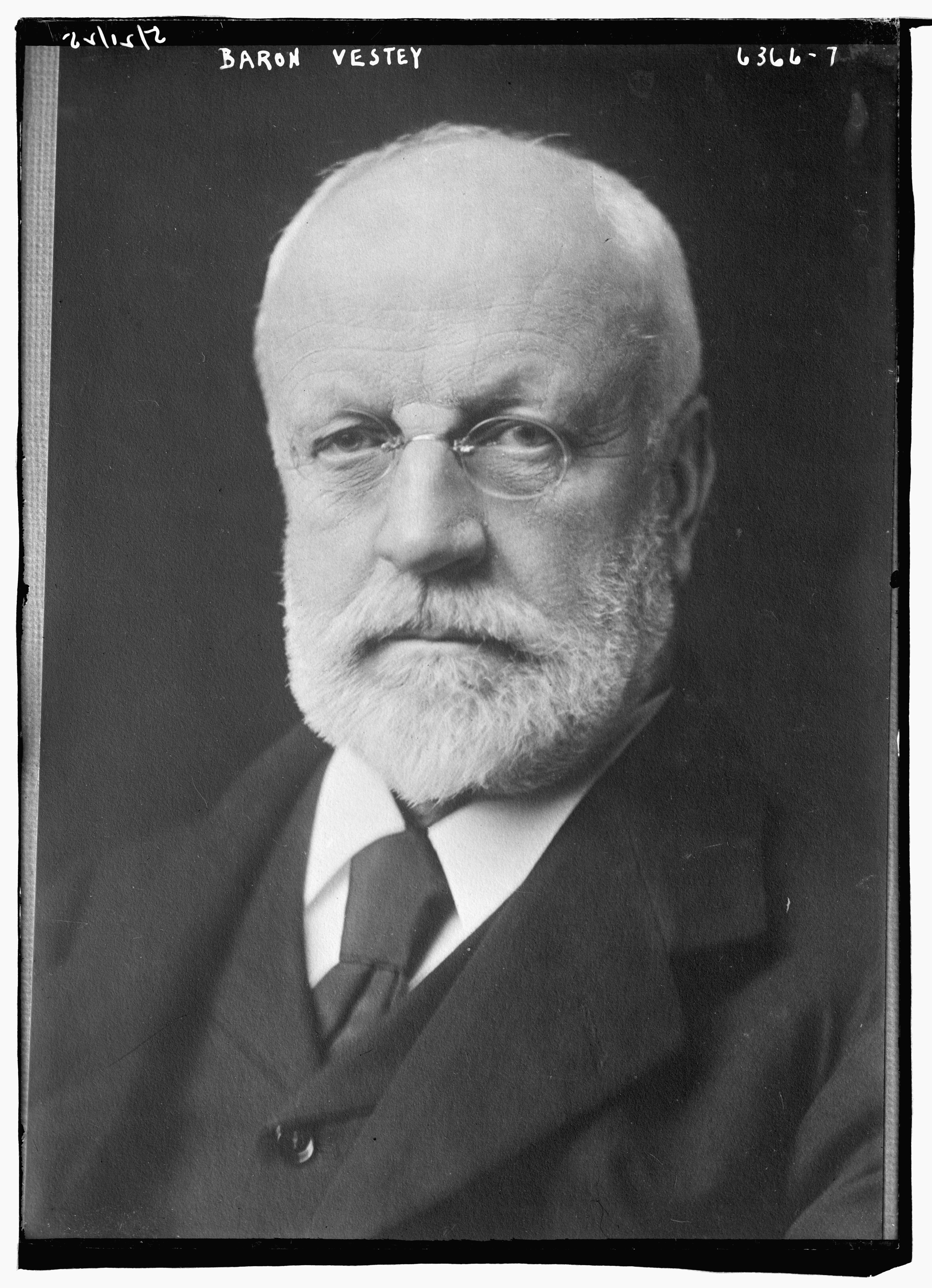
- Baron Vestey in 1925
- Born: 21 January 1859
- Died: 10 December 1940 (aged 81)
- Resting place: Liverpool Cathedral
- Occupation: Businessman
- Title: 1st Baron Vestey
- Successor: Samuel Vestey, 2nd Baron

William Vestey, 1st Baron Vestey (21 January 1859 – 10 December 1940), was an English shipping magnate.

== Biography ==
=== Early life ===
William Vestey was born on 21 January 1859. He came from an old Liverpool family of traders. In 1876, at the age of seventeen, he was sent to Chicago by his father Samuel Vestey, a provisioner of Liverpool.

=== Career ===
He first managed a meat canning factory that was financed by his father. Together with his younger brother Edmund, he established Vestey Brothers (which later became the Vestey Group) in 1897 from a family butchery business in Liverpool. They were pioneers of refrigeration, opening a cold store in London in 1895.

The Vestey brothers then went to South America in an attempt to make a fortune because the economy there was booming. They started by buying game birds and storing them in the cold stores of American companies before shipping them to Liverpool. These early activities soon developed into importing beef and beef products into the UK, which in turn led to them owning cattle ranches in Brazil, Venezuela and Australia, and their own meat processing factories in Argentina, Uruguay (Frigorífico Anglo del Uruguay), New Zealand and Australia. In 1914, they built a meat processing works at Bullocky Point, Darwin, Australia, but closed its operations in 1920 after the Darwin Rebellion.

They acquired the 3,000-square-kilometre (1,200 sq mi) Wave Hill Station in the Northern Territory of Australia, in 1914. At that time, legislation permitted Aboriginal Australian workers to be paid in tea, tobacco and other rations. The Vesteys refused to pay their workers in wages, leading to tensions and arguments from the beginning, which continued until the Wave Hill walk-off, a strike beginning in 1967 and lasting eight years.

In 1915, the brothers, after being refused a request for income tax exemption made to David Lloyd George, moved to Buenos Aires to avoid paying income tax in the UK. The family later administered the business through a Paris trust that enabled it to legally avoid UK tax until the loophole was closed in 1991. From 1915 to 1918, they moved to Chicago then to Argentina and back to England. Lord Vestey later became an important benefactor to Liverpool Cathedral, where he funded the building of the bell tower.

=== First World War and peerage ===
During the First World War another Vestey company, the Blue Star Line (now part of P&O Nedlloyd), was a major supplier of Argentine beef to England, and it was for this service to the wartime provisioning of England that William Vestey was later raised to the peerage. He was made a Baronet of Bessémer House in the Metropoliton Borough of Camberwell on 21 June 1913, and Baron Vestey of Kingswood in the County of Surrey on 20 June 1922.

His appointment occurred at the height of the honours scandal surrounding the sale of peerage, which implicated the Prime Minister, David Lloyd George. William Vestey was not consider worthy of ennoblement because the Vestey brothers had moved their meatpacking business out of the country during the First World War, to avoid paying millions of pounds in tax. Even though King George V opposed Sir William becoming a baron, he received the title from Lloyd George after paying a £20,000 political donation.

=== Personal life ===
His first wife died in 1923 and was buried in Liverpool Cathedral. He then married Evelene Brodstone of Superior, Nebraska, on 1 August 1924. She had been working as a stenographer with the Vestey Meat Packing Plant in Chicago, where she was spotted by his brother. She would rise through the company, eventually becoming the highest paid female executive in the world. She survived him following his death aged 81 in December 1940. His ashes were buried in Liverpool Cathedral. On 24 July 1941, the 2nd Lady Vestey was buried at Evergreen Cemetery of Superior in Nebraska. Each spring during memorial weekend, Superior holds the annual Lady Vestey Festival in her honour. This is the town's largest annual celebration and it attracts many people from around the area.

== Literature ==
- Phillip Knightley The Rise and Fall of the House of Vestey, on the business empire established by William Vestey in 1897;

Peerage of the United Kingdom
New creation	Baron Vestey; 1922–1940; Member of the House of Lords (1922–1940)	Succeeded by Samuel Vestey
Baronetage of the United Kingdom
New creation	Baronet of Bessemer House; 1913–1940	Succeeded by Samuel Vestey
