= Lawrence, Nebraska =

- Village
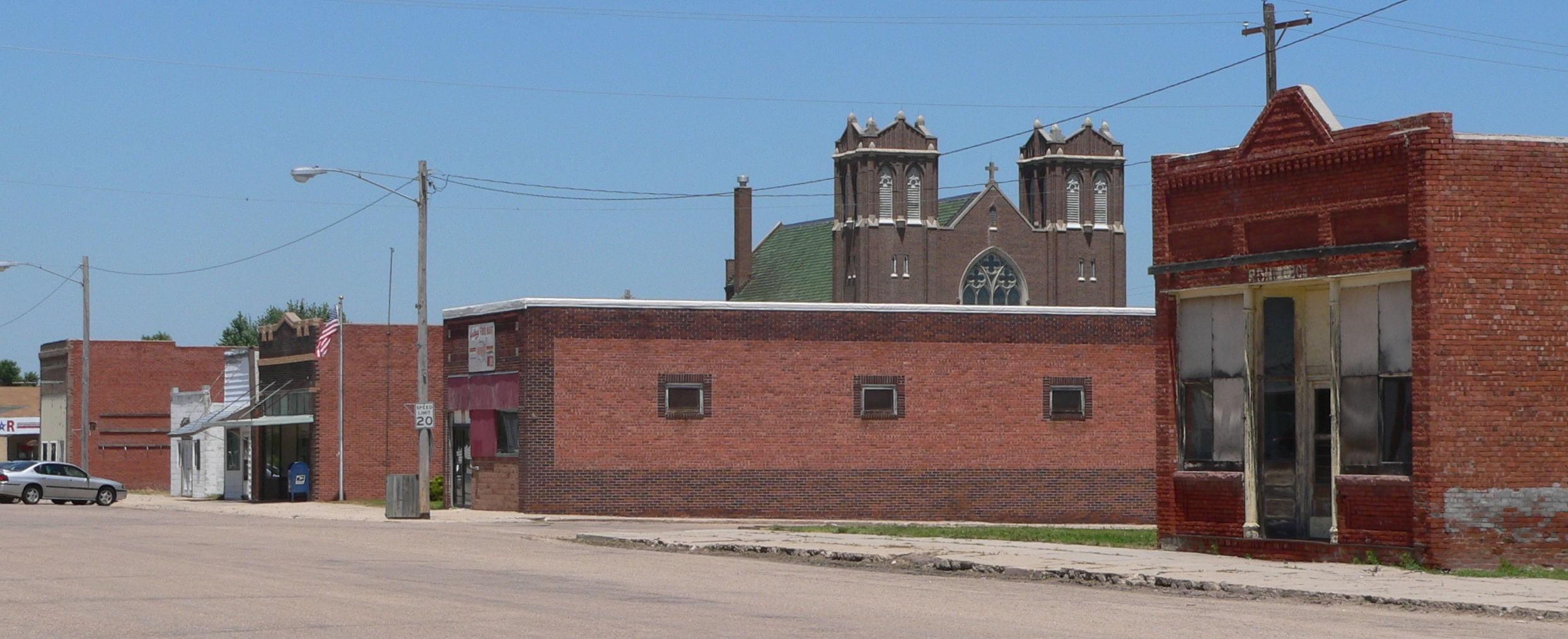
- Downtown Lawrence: east side of Calvert Street
- Motto: "A Small Town With A Big Heart"
- Location of Lawrence, Nebraska
- Coordinates: 40°17′25″N 98°15′35″W
- Country: United States
- State: Nebraska
- County: Nuckolls

Area
  - Total: 0.41 sq mi (1.07 km^{2})
  - Land: 0.41 sq mi (1.07 km^{2})
  - Water: 0 sq mi (0.00 km^{2})
- Elevation: 1,880 ft (570 m)

Population (2020)
  - Total: 272
  - Density: 655.7/sq mi (253.17/km^{2})
- Time zone: UTC-6 (Central (CST))
  - Summer (DST): UTC-5 (CDT)
- ZIP code: 68957
- Area code: 402
- FIPS code: 31-26420
- GNIS feature ID: 2398403
- Website: lawrence-ne.com

Lawrence is a village in Nuckolls County, Nebraska, United States. As of the 2020 census, Lawrence had a population of 272.

== History ==
Lawrence was platted in 1886 when the Chicago, Burlington and Quincy Railroad was extended to that point. It was named for a railroad official.

== Geography ==
According to the United States Census Bureau, the village has a total area of 0.42 square miles (1.09 km^{2}), all land.

=== Climate ===
Climate data for Lawrence, NE (1991-2020 precipitation normals)Elevation: 1,032 feet (315 metres). Lat: 40.2880° N Lon: 98.2581° W
Month	Jan	Feb	Mar	Apr	May	Jun	Jul	Aug	Sep	Oct	Nov	Dec	Year
Average precipitation inches	0.67	0.89	1.49	2.63	4.71	4.23	4.13	3.50	2.14	2.17	1.44	0.87	28.87
Average precipitation mm	17	23	38	67	120	107	105	89	54	55	37	22	734
Average precipitation days (≥ 0.01 in)	3.2	4.1	6.3	9	10	10.3	9.5	7.8	7.2	7	3.5	4.1	82
Source: NOAA

== Demographics ==
Historical population
Census	Pop.	Note	%±
1900	406		—
1910	475		17.0%
1920	538		13.3%
1930	528		−1.9%
1940	445		−15.7%
1950	376		−15.5%
1960	338		−10.1%
1970	343		1.5%
1980	350		2.0%
1990	323		−7.7%
2000	312		−3.4%
2010	304		−2.6%
2020	272		−10.5%
U.S. Decennial Census; 2012 Estimate

=== 2010 census ===
As of the census of 2010, there were 304 people, 145 households, and 89 families living in the village. The population density was 723.8 inhabitants per square mile (279.5/km^{2}). There were 160 housing units at an average density of 381.0 per square mile (147.1/km^{2}). The racial makeup of the village was 99.0% White, 0.3% Asian, and 0.7% from two or more races.

There were 145 households, of which 20.0% had children under the age of 18 living with them, 58.6% were married couples living together, 1.4% had a female householder with no husband present, 1.4% had a male householder with no wife present, and 38.6% were non-families. 33.1% of all households were made up of individuals, and 16.5% had someone living alone who was 65 years of age or older. The average household size was 2.10 and the average family size was 2.67.

The median age in the village was 50.3 years. 18.4% of residents were under the age of 18; 5.6% were between the ages of 18 and 24; 19.8% were from 25 to 44; 24.7% were from 45 to 64; and 31.6% were 65 years of age or older. The gender makeup of the village was 51.0% male and 49.0% female.

=== 2000 census ===
As of the census of 2000, there were 312 people, 157 households, and 94 families living in the village. The population density was 752.2 inhabitants per square mile (290.4/km^{2}). There were 167 housing units at an average density of 402.6 per square mile (155.4/km^{2}). The racial makeup of the village was 98.40% White, 1.60% from other races. Hispanic or Latino of any race were 1.60% of the population.

There were 157 households, out of which 21.7% had children under the age of 18 living with them, 57.3% were married couples living together, 3.2% had a female householder with no husband present, and 39.5% were non-families. 39.5% of all households were made up of individuals, and 22.3% had someone living alone who was 65 years of age or older. The average household size was 1.99 and the average family size was 2.63.

In the village, the population was spread out, with 19.6% under the age of 18, 4.2% from 18 to 24, 20.8% from 25 to 44, 19.2% from 45 to 64, and 36.2% who were 65 years of age or older. The median age was 50 years. For every 100 females, there were 92.6 males. For every 100 females age 18 and over, there were 96.1 males.

As of 2000 the median income for a household in the village was $25,089, and the median income for a family was $30,750. Males had a median income of $23,500 versus $22,000 for females. The per capita income for the village was $14,634. About 8.2% of families and 8.3% of the population were below the poverty line, including 14.1% of those under age 18 and 6.8% of those age 65 or over.
