= Samuel Vestey, 2nd Baron Vestey =

British peer

Samuel Vestey, 2nd Baron Vestey (25 December 1882 – 4 May 1954) was a British noble.

== Early life ==
He was the son of William Vestey, 1st Baron Vestey, and was educated at Merton College, Oxford, matriculating in 1901.

He served as Sheriff of Gloucestershire in 1933.

He succeeded to the title on his father's death in 1940.

== Career ==
He was a Justice of the Peace, and photographs of him by Lafayette are in the collection of the National Portrait Gallery.

== Personal life ==
In 1908, he married Frances Sarah Howarth, they had three children:

- Hon. Kathleen Sarah Vestey (born in May 1909), married Captain Maurice John Kingscote (30 July 1887 – 5 June 1959) on 18 September 1936.
- Captain Hon. William Howarth Vestey (1912–1944), killed in action in Italy
- Hon. Joan Frances Vestey (1914–1991)

On his death in 1954, he was succeeded by his grandson, Samuel Vestey, 3rd Baron Vestey, son of William Vestey.

Peerage of the United Kingdom
Preceded by William Vestey	Baron Vestey; 1940–1954	Succeeded by Samuel Vestey
