= Nelson, Nebraska =

- City
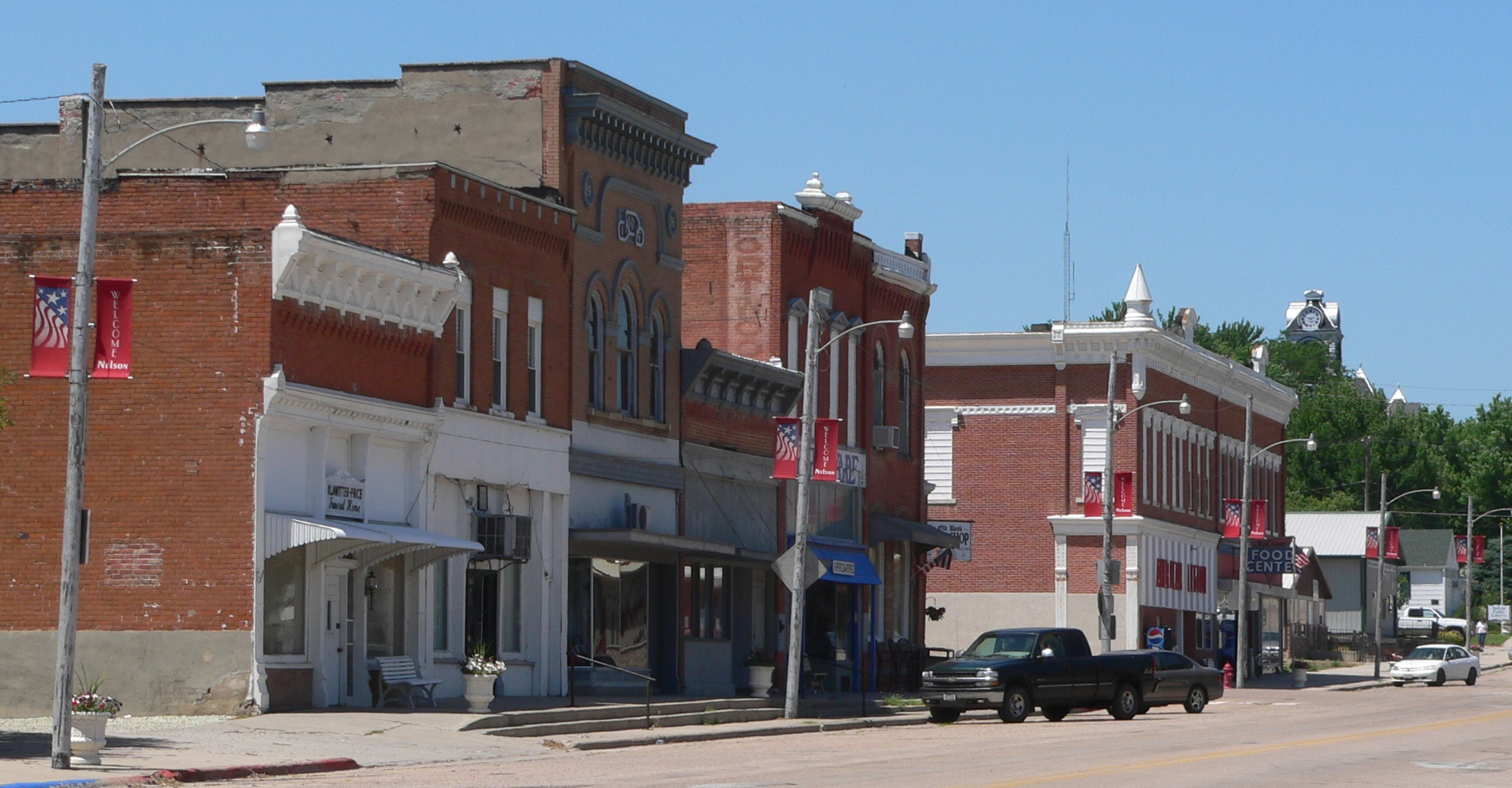
- Downtown, west side of Main Street, looking NW, 2010

- Location of Nelson, Nebraska
- Coordinates: 40°12′04″N 98°04′07″W
- Country: United States
- State: Nebraska
- County: Nuckolls

Area
  - Total: 0.81 sq mi (2.11 km^{2})
  - Land: 0.81 sq mi (2.11 km^{2})
  - Water: 0 sq mi (0.00 km^{2})
- Elevation: 1,700 ft (520 m)

Population (2020)
  - Total: 456
  - Density: 558.9/sq mi (215.81/km^{2})
- Time zone: UTC-6 (Central (CST))
  - Summer (DST): UTC-5 (CDT)
- ZIP code: 68961
- Area code: 402
- FIPS code: 31-33880
- GNIS feature ID: 2395167
- Website: cityofnelson.com

Nelson is a city in and the county seat of Nuckolls County, Nebraska, United States. As of the 2020 census, Nelson had a population of 456. The city was named from the middle name of one Horatio Nelson Wheeler, the original owner of the town site.

== History ==
The city was named as the county seat in 1873, and its position survived a challenge by Superior in 1889. Nelson's population reached a high of 1,000 in 1900, but has since declined gradually.

== Geography ==
According to the United States Census Bureau, the city has a total area of 0.82 square miles (2.12 km^{2}), all land.

== Demographics ==
Historical population
Census	Pop.	Note	%±
1880	196		—
1890	913		365.8%
1900	978		7.1%
1910	978		0.0%
1920	955		−2.4%
1930	903		−5.4%
1940	963		6.6%
1950	806		−16.3%
1960	695		−13.8%
1970	746		7.3%
1980	733		−1.7%
1990	627		−14.5%
2000	587		−6.4%
2010	488		−16.9%
2020	456		−6.6%
U.S. Decennial Census; 2018 Estimate

=== 2010 census ===
As of the census of 2010, there were 488 people, 243 households, and 143 families residing in the city. The population density was 595.1 inhabitants per square mile (229.8/km^{2}). There were 300 housing units at an average density of 365.9 per square mile (141.3/km^{2}). The racial makeup of the city was 97.7% White, 0.2% from other races, and 2.0% from two or more races. Hispanic or Latino of any race were 1.6% of the population.

There were 243 households, of which 21.0% had children under the age of 18 living with them, 46.5% were married couples living together, 8.2% had a female householder with no husband present, 4.1% had a male householder with no wife present, and 41.2% were non-families. 37.4% of all households were made up of individuals, and 20.1% had someone living alone who was 65 years of age or older. The average household size was 2.01 and the average family size was 2.59.

The median age in the city was 50.3 years. 19.9% of residents were under the age of 18; 4.4% were between the ages of 18 and 24; 18.4% were from 25 to 44; 29% were from 45 to 64; and 28.3% were 65 years of age or older. The gender makeup of the city was 49.0% male and 51.0% female.

=== 2000 census ===
As of the census of 2000, there were 587 people, 271 households, and 150 families residing in the city. The population density was 724.8 inhabitants per square mile (279.8/km^{2}). There were 312 housing units at an average density of 385.2 per square mile (148.7/km^{2}). The racial makeup of the city was 99.49% White and 0.51% from two or more races. Hispanic or Latino of any race were 1.19% of the population.

There were 271 households, out of which 22.9% had children under the age of 18 living with them, 46.1% were married couples living together, 7.0% had a female householder with no husband present, and 44.6% were non-families. 41.7% of all households were made up of individuals, and 25.5% had someone living alone who was 65 years of age or older. The average household size was 2.01 and the average family size was 2.73.

In the city, the population was spread out, with 20.3% under the age of 18, 3.9% from 18 to 24, 21.0% from 25 to 44, 23.7% from 45 to 64, and 31.2% who were 65 years of age or older. The median age was 50 years. For every 100 females, there were 80.6 males. For every 100 females age 18 and over, there were 75.9 males.

As of 2000 the median income for a household in the city was $32,500, and the median income for a family was $40,469. Males had a median income of $25,417 versus $22,500 for females. The per capita income for the village was $17,221. About 5.2% of families and 9.4% of the population were below the poverty line, including 14.8% of those under age 18 and 8.5% of those age 65 or over.

== Notable person ==
Former Major League Baseball player Russ Snyder, who starred in the 1966 World Series, lives in Nelson.

== See also ==
- National Register of Historic Places listings in Nuckolls County, Nebraska
