= Superior, Nebraska =

- City
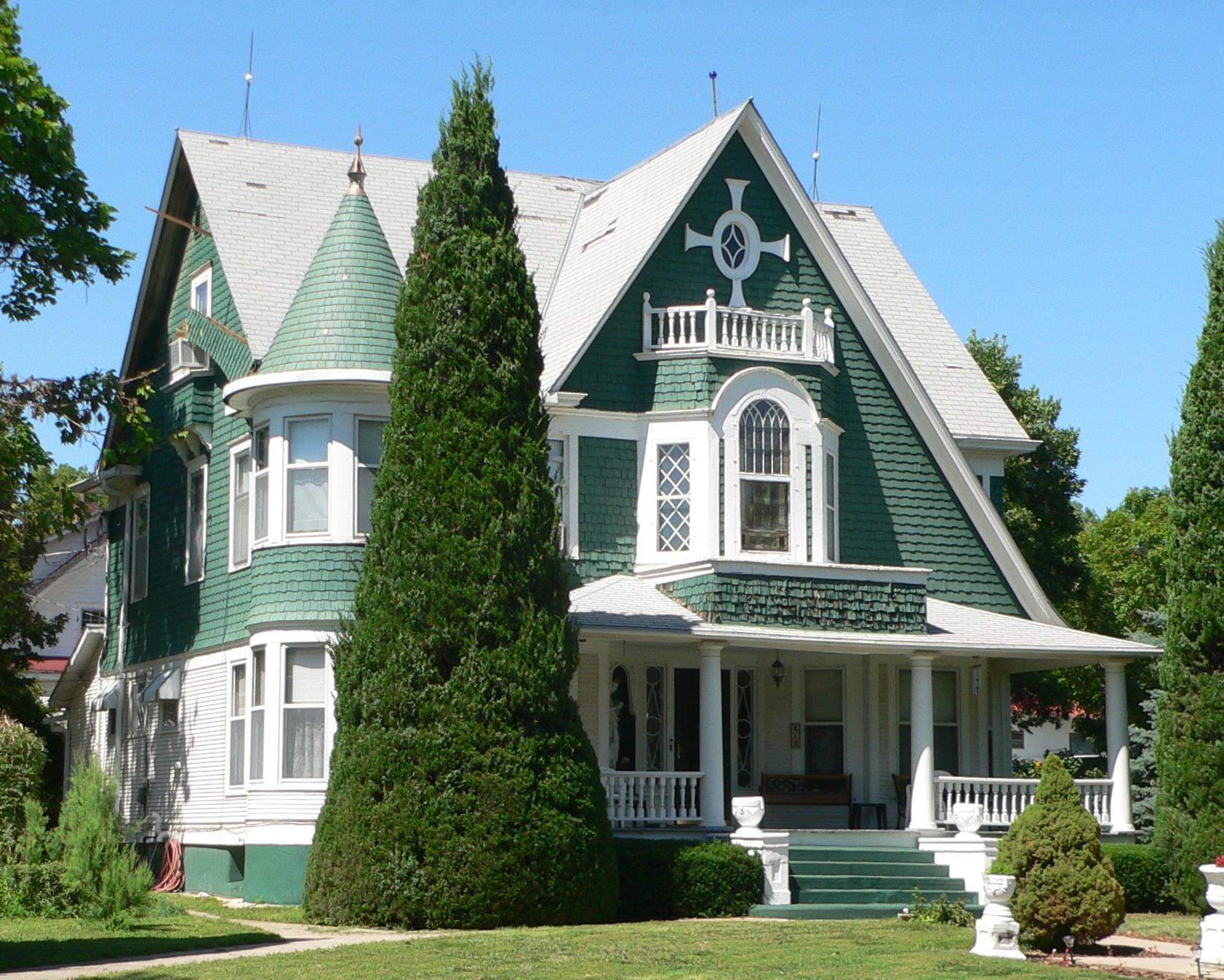
- The Kendall House in Superior, built in 1898, is generally open for tours during Superior's Victorian Festival

- Location of Superior, Nebraska
- Coordinates: 40°01′18″N 98°03′42″W
- Country: United States
- State: Nebraska
- County: Nuckolls
- Incorporated: 1879

Government
  - Type: Mayor–Council

Area
  - Total: 2.23 sq mi (5.78 km^{2})
  - Land: 2.23 sq mi (5.78 km^{2})
  - Water: 0 sq mi (0.00 km^{2})
- Elevation: 1,621 ft (494 m)

Population (2020)
  - Total: 1,825
  - Density: 817.5/sq mi (315.62/km^{2})
- Time zone: UTC-6 (Central (CST))
  - Summer (DST): UTC-5 (CDT)
- ZIP code: 68978
- Area code: 402
- FIPS code: 31-47815
- GNIS feature ID: 2396009
- Website: City website

Superior is a city in Nuckolls County, Nebraska, United States. As of the 2020 census, Superior had a population of 1,825.

Superior bills itself as the "Victorian Capital of Nebraska", and holds an annual Victorian Festival. The downtown area is listed in the National Register of Historic Places; along with many of the older houses in the city, it has been maintained or restored to its Victorian appearance.

== History ==
=== 19th century ===
Superior was platted in 1875. It was named from the quality of their land.

In 1887, Atchison, Topeka and Santa Fe Railway built a branch line from Neva (3 miles west of Strong City) to Superior. At some point, the line from Neva to Lost Springs was pulled but the right of way has not been abandoned. This branch line was originally called "Strong City and Superior line" but later the name was shortened to the "Strong City line". In 1996, the Atchison, Topeka and Santa Fe Railway merged with Burlington Northern Railroad and renamed to the current BNSF Railway. Most locals still refer to this railroad as the "Santa Fe".

=== 20th century ===
Superior was one of the smallest cities in America that supported a professional minor league baseball team, the Superior Senators (1956–58) of the Nebraska State League. Superior was the first professional stop in the career of pitcher Jim Kaat, who went on to win 283 games in a 24-year Major League career.

=== 21st century ===
In October 2021, a local grain elevator was the site of a workplace shooting, in which two employees were killed and another person injured. The shooter, identified as a 61-year-old employee of the grain elevator who was fired earlier that day, was then killed by another employee who retrieved a shotgun from an office and shot him. The whole incident lasted about 20 seconds.

== Geography ==
According to the United States Census Bureau, the city has a total area of 1.89 square miles (4.90 km^{2}), all land.

=== Climate ===
Climate data for Superior, Nebraska (1991–2020 normals, extremes 1902–present)
Month	Jan	Feb	Mar	Apr	May	Jun	Jul	Aug	Sep	Oct	Nov	Dec	Year
Record high °F (°C)	78 (26)	83 (28)	101 (38)	99 (37)	102 (39)	108 (42)	112 (44)	110 (43)	106 (41)	97 (36)	86 (30)	79 (26)	112 (44)
Mean maximum °F (°C)	61.8 (16.6)	68.3 (20.2)	78.6 (25.9)	86.4 (30.2)	93.6 (34.2)	97.8 (36.6)	101.3 (38.5)	100.0 (37.8)	96.0 (35.6)	88.3 (31.3)	74.3 (23.5)	62.8 (17.1)	102.6 (39.2)
Mean daily maximum °F (°C)	36.7 (2.6)	41.5 (5.3)	53.4 (11.9)	64.2 (17.9)	74.1 (23.4)	84.7 (29.3)	88.7 (31.5)	86.4 (30.2)	79.8 (26.6)	66.6 (19.2)	52.0 (11.1)	39.4 (4.1)	64.0 (17.8)
Daily mean °F (°C)	25.2 (−3.8)	29.3 (−1.5)	40.0 (4.4)	50.4 (10.2)	61.7 (16.5)	72.4 (22.4)	76.7 (24.8)	74.2 (23.4)	66.2 (19.0)	52.9 (11.6)	39.0 (3.9)	28.1 (−2.2)	51.3 (10.7)
Mean daily minimum °F (°C)	13.7 (−10.2)	17.1 (−8.3)	26.5 (−3.1)	36.6 (2.6)	49.3 (9.6)	60.1 (15.6)	64.6 (18.1)	62.0 (16.7)	52.7 (11.5)	39.1 (3.9)	25.9 (−3.4)	16.7 (−8.5)	38.7 (3.7)
Mean minimum °F (°C)	−4.6 (−20.3)	0.3 (−17.6)	9.6 (−12.4)	22.3 (−5.4)	35.0 (1.7)	47.9 (8.8)	54.8 (12.7)	52.5 (11.4)	37.8 (3.2)	23.1 (−4.9)	10.0 (−12.2)	0.4 (−17.6)	−8.0 (−22.2)
Record low °F (°C)	−25 (−32)	−33 (−36)	−10 (−23)	5 (−15)	20 (−7)	38 (3)	44 (7)	41 (5)	25 (−4)	12 (−11)	−7 (−22)	−30 (−34)	−33 (−36)
Average precipitation inches (mm)	0.70 (18)	0.82 (21)	1.55 (39)	2.34 (59)	4.51 (115)	4.01 (102)	4.06 (103)	3.36 (85)	2.27 (58)	1.96 (50)	1.29 (33)	1.02 (26)	27.89 (708)
Average snowfall inches (cm)	5.5 (14)	6.0 (15)	2.9 (7.4)	0.7 (1.8)	0.0 (0.0)	0.0 (0.0)	0.0 (0.0)	0.0 (0.0)	0.0 (0.0)	0.4 (1.0)	1.8 (4.6)	4.0 (10)	21.3 (54)
Average precipitation days (≥ 0.01 in)	5.3	5.1	7.3	9.2	10.7	9.6	9.1	8.5	6.4	6.5	4.8	4.8	87.3
Average snowy days (≥ 0.1 in)	4.0	3.7	2.3	0.6	0.0	0.0	0.0	0.0	0.0	0.3	1.6	3.1	15.6
Source: NOAA

== Demographics ==
Historical population
Census	Pop.	Note	%±
1880	458		—
1890	1,614		252.4%
1900	1,577		−2.3%
1910	2,106		33.5%
1920	2,719		29.1%
1930	3,044		12.0%
1940	2,650		−12.9%
1950	3,227		21.8%
1960	2,935		−9.0%
1970	2,779		−5.3%
1980	2,502		−10.0%
1990	2,397		−4.2%
2000	2,055		−14.3%
2010	1,957		−4.8%
2020	1,825		−6.7%
U.S. Decennial Census; 2013 Estimate

=== 2010 census ===
At the 2010 census there were 1,957 people, 948 households, and 527 families living in the city. The population density was 1,037.6 inhabitants per square mile (400.6/km^{2}). There were 1,109 housing units at an average density of 588 per square mile (227/km^{2}). The racial makeup of the city was 97% White, 0.2% African American, 0.5% Asian, 0.2% from other races, and 1.9% from two or more races. Hispanic or Latino of any race were 2% of the population.

Of the 948 households 20% had children under the age of 18 living with them, 45.1% were married couples living together, 8% had a female householder with no husband present, and 44.4% were non-families. 21.3% of households were one person living alone and 43.5% were one person aged 65 or older. The average household size was 2 and the average family size was 2.66.

The age distribution was 19.6% under the age of 18, 8.8% from 18 to 24, 17.3% from 25 to 44, 26.6% from 45 to 64, and 31.4% 65 or older. The median age was 51.3 years. For every 100 females, there were 92 males. For every 100 females age 18 and over, there were 72 males.

=== 2000 census ===
At the 2000 census, there were 2,055 people, 980 households, and 598 families living in the city. The population density was 1,090.6 inhabitants per square mile (421.1/km^{2}). There were 1,123 housing units at an average density of 596.0 per square mile (230.1/km^{2}). The racial makeup of the city was 98.83% White, 0.05% African American, 0.24% Asian, 0.54% from other races, and 0.34% from two or more races. Hispanic or Latino of any race were 1.02% of the population.

Of the 980 households 23.3% had children under the age of 18 living with them, 53.7% were married couples living together, 6.4% had a female householder with no husband present, and 38.9% were non-families. 36.7% of households were one person and 21.4% were one person aged 65 or older. The average household size was 2.10 and the average family size was 2.72.

The age distribution was 21.4% under the age of 18, 4.2% from 18 to 24, 21.0% from 25 to 44, 24.6% from 45 to 64, and 28.8% 65 or older. The median age was 48 years. For every 100 females, there were 82.8 males. For every 100 females age 18 and over, there were 81.1 males.

The median household income was $28,405, and the median family income was $33,125. Males had a median income of $24,125 versus $21,542 for females. The per capita income for the city was $20,525. About 10.4% of families and 13.7% of the population were below the poverty line, including 35.2% of those under age 18 and 3% of those age 65 or over.

== Government ==
The Superior government consists of a mayor and council members. The council meets the 2nd and 4th Monday of each month at 7:30PM.

- City Hall, 135 West 4th Street.

== Notable people ==
- Evelene Brodstone, later Evelyn Vestey, Lady Vestey, executive and baroness, grew up in Superior.
- Jan (Crilly) Meyers, U.S. Representative from Kansas 1985–1997, grew up in Superior.
- Ed Weir, All-American football player

== See also ==
- National Register of Historic Places listings in Nuckolls County, Nebraska
