= Vestey Holdings =

Holding company based in Surrey, United Kingdom

- Company type: Private
- Predecessor: Vestey Group
- Headquarters: Surrey, United Kingdom
- Website: vesteyholdings.com

Vestey Holdings, formerly Vestey Group and previously also known as Vestey Brothers, is a privately owned United Kingdom group of companies comprising an international business focused mainly on food products and services. The company has owned vast holdings overseas, mainly in South America and Australia, and continues to own some.

The Vestey family were estimated to be the second wealthiest family in Britain (after the King) in 1940. Vestey Brothers was the largest privately owned multinational company and the largest retailer of meat in the world in the 1980s. In 1980, it was discovered that the company had operated a tax avoidance scheme,

Union International, formerly the core of the Vestey family business as the Union Cold Storage Company, entered receivership in 1995. The company has been restructured several times.

== Current holdings and governance ==
As of August 2020 Vestey Holdings owns Vestey Foods, Albion Fine Foods & FineFrance UK, Cottage Delight, Donald Russell (butchers) and Western Pension Solutions.

Vestey Foods (incorporated 16 November 1994) owns Vestey Foods UK, Vestey Foods Benelux, Vestey Foods France, Vestey Foods International, Vestey Foods Baltics, and Vestey Foods Middle East. The company's main business is in sourcing, processing and distribution of products made from meat, fish, seafood, dairy products, fruit and vegetables, and convenience foods. It trades in 70 countries, with customers in the retail, food service, wholesale, government and manufacturing sectors.

The 3rd Baron Vestey (19 March 1941 – 4 February 2021), great-grandson of co-founder William Vestey (later Lord Vestey), was Chairman of the Vestey Group from 1995 until his death in 2021.

George Vestey has been CEO of Vestey Holdings since 2010, and his brother Robin Non-Executive Chairman since 2013 (after becoming a main board director after their father Edmund’s retirement in 2004).

The family was still immensely wealthy in 2015; 160th on the Sunday Times Rich List 2015, with an estimated fortune of £700 million. Actor Tom Hiddleston is the great-great-grandson of co-founder Sir Edmund Vestey, 1st Baronet.

As of 2020, the Vestey family's farming interests are mainly in Brazil, in both the cattle industry and sugar cane production. A 12,000-hectare (30,000-acre) tree-planting programme is set to supply eucalyptus wood to the iron ore industry in Brazil. The family also has two wine companies in Australia: The Lane Vineyard in the Adelaide Hills of South Australia, and Delatite Wines in Victoria, Australia.

== History ==
William and his younger brother Edmund (later Sir Edmund) established the Vestey empire in 1897 from a family butchery business in Liverpool. They were pioneers of refrigeration, opening a cold store in London in 1895 and developing stores across the UK, and then throughout Russia, the Baltic nations, and Western Europe. The company supplied large quantities of food to the growing UK population during the Industrial Revolution.

William Vestey earlier worked in stockyards in Chicago in the late 19th century, and realised that the meat waste could be used in products which were then in short supply in Britain. He and Edmund started a canning business, before foreseeing that the meat could be worth even more if the vast supplies of beef in the Americas could be transported and delivered fresh rather than canned, so they first experimented with a friend's cold store. The invention of the first ammonia-compression plant enabled refrigerated shipments, and their business grew.

=== International expansion ===
The first expansion was into China, in the early 20th century, where the company developed a huge egg processing enterprise. Creating their own shipping company, the Blue Star Line, they supplied outlets in the UK, USA, Europe and South Africa for over fifty years.

In 1911, the Vestey brothers expanded into meat production, processing and distribution, with pastoral properties as well as meatworks in Venezuela, Australia and Brazil, and meatworks in New Zealand and Argentina. In the UK, they bought market stalls on the Smithfield Market in London, and butcher shops throughout the UK, the Dewhurst the Butchers chain.

In 1912 they purchased for £250,000 the Ord River cattle station in the East Kimberley region of Western Australia from investor Sam Copley. In 1914, they established the North Australia Meat Company in Darwin, Northern Territory in Australia, but it failed after three years. In the same year, it bought the 3,000 km^{2} (1,200 sq mi) Wave Hill Station in the Northern Territory of Australia.

In 1915, the brothers, after being refused a request for income tax exemption made to David Lloyd George, moved to Buenos Aires to avoid paying income tax in the UK. The family later administered the business through a Paris trust that enabled it to legally avoid an estimated total of £88m in UK tax until the loophole was closed in 1991.

In 1924, Vesteys bought the Liebig Extract of Meat Company in Uruguay, created Frigorífico Anglo del Uruguay out of it, which marketed Fray Bentos meat extract spread. also known as the "Anglo Meatpacking Company".

It is said that by 1930 Vesteys had 30,000 employees worldwide and a net value of £300,000.

The Vestey family were estimated to be the second wealthiest family in Britain (after the King) in 1940. In 1980, it was discovered that the company had operated a tax avoidance scheme, and Vestey Brothers was the largest privately owned multinational company and the largest retailer of meat in the world in the 1980s.

=== UK developments ===
In the course of their expansion, Vestey bought a number of other companies, acquiring Oxo and London's Oxo Tower through the purchase of the Liebig Extract of Meat Company.

In the middle of the 20th century, Vestey companies dominated the UK wholesale and retail meat trade, selling refrigerated and canned meats, as well as leather and other by-products. Having saved cash reserves for the purpose, they entered into a price war with the US-owned importers to largely drive them from the UK market. Vestey developed the country-wide Dewhurst the Butchers chain, which was eventually sold in 1995 in the face of increasing competition from the supermarket chains. Dewhurst was among the first retailers to introduce glass windows in its butcher's shops – previously meat had been exposed to the elements and pollution. The business also owned the Downsway supermarket group, which was based in East Anglia and had 80 stores at the time of its sale to rival Fine Fare in 1978.

=== 1966 Gurindji Strike, Australia ===
By the middle of the twentieth century, the Vestey Group had acquired a large amount of grazing land in Australia, and used many Aboriginal Australians as cheap labour. They were paid less than a quarter of the minimum wage of non-Indigenous workers and sometimes only received salt beef, bread, tobacco, flour, sugar and tea instead of a salary. The 3rd Baron Vestey, through the company, owned the Wave Hill Station in Australia at the time.

In 1966, this unfair treatment, coupled with earlier dispossession of their land by the colonial government, sparked the Gurindji strike (also known as the Wave Hill walk-off) at Wave Hill. This was a landmark event in the land rights movement in Australia and lasted for eight years. With much public support, the Whitlam government entered negotiations with Vestey and a small grant of land at Daguragu/Wattie Creek was handed back to the Gurindji people, as an initial step towards the final land handback.

== Shipping ==
The first two ships for the Blue Star Line (Pakeha renamed Broderick, and Rangatira renamed Brodmore) were bought in 1909, and the company registered on 28 July 1911 in London and Liverpool with a capital of £100,000.

In 1946 the Vesteys also became founders of Repremar Shipping, a Uruguay-based ship agency which was then taken over a few decades later by the Pena family, who to this day remain in control of the Repremar Group of Companies.

The line owned a number of refrigerated ships (Reefers), and business later expanded to countries as far apart as Egypt and China, carrying passengers in addition to various foodstuffs. Blue Star was finally sold to P&O Nedlloyd for £60 million in 1998, although most of the refrigerated ships were retained by Vestey's Albion Reefers subsidiary, which later merged with Hamburg Süd to form Star Reefers, finally sold off in July 2001.

The company had to be rebuilt twice, in the years following the world wars, before being sold in 1998.

== 21st century ==
By 2000, the vertically integrated model was broken up, and separate companies created to run farming, cold storage, and food import and distribution businesses.

=== 2005 Venezuela handback ===
In Venezuela in 2005, state troops occupied a cattle ranch owned by the Vestey Group, under a 2001 land use reform programme instituted by the Hugo Chávez government. In March 2006, the Group reached an agreement with the Venezuelan government, ceding two ranches to the state while retaining ownership of eight.

== Philanthropy ==
There was a "Vestey Chair of Food Safety and Veterinary Public Health" at the Royal Veterinary College, University of London recorded in 1992, and 2000, "the first post of its kind in the UK".

== Former subsidiaries ==
- The Blue Star Line was sold to P&O Nedlloyd for £60 million in 1998.
- Dewhurst butchers – sold to Lloyd Maunder 2005, entered administration in 2006.
