= Edmund Vestey, 1st Baronet =

English businessman (1866–1953), co-founder of Vestey Brothers, now Vestey Group

Sir Edmund Vestey Bt

Chairman of Vestey Brothers
- In office 1940 – 18 November 1953

Personal details
- Born: Edmund Hoyle Vestey; 3 February 1866 Rainford, Lancashire, England
- Died: 18 November 1953 (aged 87)
- Occupation: Food producer, importer and shipowner

Sir Edmund Hoyle Vestey, 1st Baronet (3 February 1866 – 18 November 1953), was an English food producer and importer and shipowner, and co-founder with his brother William of Vestey Brothers.

== Early life ==
Vestey was born in Rainford, Lancashire, the fifth child of provision merchant Samuel Vestey. He was educated at the Liverpool Institute and then joined his father's firm in 1883.

== Career ==
He was soon given the management of his father's corned beef cannery in Chicago. In 1890 he joined William in his new business of importing refrigerated meat from Argentina. The Union Cold Storage Company was to become one of the world's largest cold storage operations. They began to diversify into other food products and in 1906 also began importing from China. In 1909, they purchased two tramp steamers (Pakeha, renamed Broderick, and Rangatira, renamed Brodmore) for the China trade and converted them into refrigerated ships. This was the beginning of the Blue Star Line, which was registered in 1911. They set up their own cattle ranches in Argentina and Australia.

The brothers acquired the 3,000-square-kilometre (1,200 sq mi) Wave Hill Station, a cattle station in the Northern Territory of Australia, in 1914. At that time, legislation permitted Aboriginal Australian workers to be paid in tea, tobacco and other rations. The Vesteys refused to pay their workers in wages, leading to tensions and arguments from the beginning, which continued until the Wave Hill walk-off, a strike beginning in 1967 and lasting eight years.

By 1925 the Blue Star Line was the largest refrigerated fleet in the world. In the United Kingdom the Vestey brothers owned 2,365 butcher's shops. Edmund succeeded William as chairman in 1940 and held the post until his death in 1953.

He was created a Baronet in the 1921 Birthday Honours for his services in supplying food to British troops during the First World War.

== Personal life ==
Vestey married Sarah Barker on 15 August 1887; they had seven children. After their divorce, Sarah married Conservative Member of Parliament Sir William Lane-Mitchell. Vestey married Ellen Soward on 10 March 1926, and they remained together until his death in 1953 when he was then aged 87. They had no children. His ashes were buried in Liverpool Cathedral.

Vestey was the maternal great-great-grandfather of actor Tom Hiddleston.

== Arms ==
Coat of arms of Edmund Vestey, 1st Baronet
Crest In front of a springbok’s head Proper three mullets Argent. Escutcheon Argent on a fess between two flaunches Gules each charged with a cross throughout of the field three roses also of the field. Motto E Labore Stabilitas

== Footnotes ==
Baronetage of the United Kingdom
New creation	Baronet (of Shirley); 1921–1953	Succeeded by Derek Vestey
