= Fray Bentos (disambiguation) =

Fray Bentos is a Uruguayan city on the River Uruguay.

Fray Bentos may also refer to:

- Fray Bentos (food brand), a brand of Baxters and Campbell's Soup Company
- Fray Bentos F.C., a football club from Fray Bentos, Uruguay
- Fray Bentos, a British Mark IV tank that achieved fame for a 60-hour action in 1917
- Fray Bentos-Puerto Unzué Bridge, an informal denomination of the Libertador General San Martín Bridge between Uruguay and Argentina
- Fray Bentos Formation, a geologic formation in Uruguay and eastern Argentina

== See also ==
- Bento (disambiguation)
- Bentos (disambiguation)
