= Liebig's Extract of Meat Company =

Former British manufacturer of food products

- Type: Subsidiary
- Industry: Food processing
- Founded: 1865
- Founder: Justus von Liebig; George Christian Giebert
- Headquarters: London, United Kingdom
- Products: Meat extract, tinned corned beef, Oxo cubes
- Parent: Unilever (formerly)

Liebig's Extract of Meat Company, established in the United Kingdom, was the producer of LEMCO brand Liebig's Extract of Meat and the originator of Oxo meat extracts and Oxo beef stock cubes. It was named after Justus Freiherr von Liebig, the 19th-century German organic chemist who developed and promoted a method for industrial production of beef extract.

== Early development ==
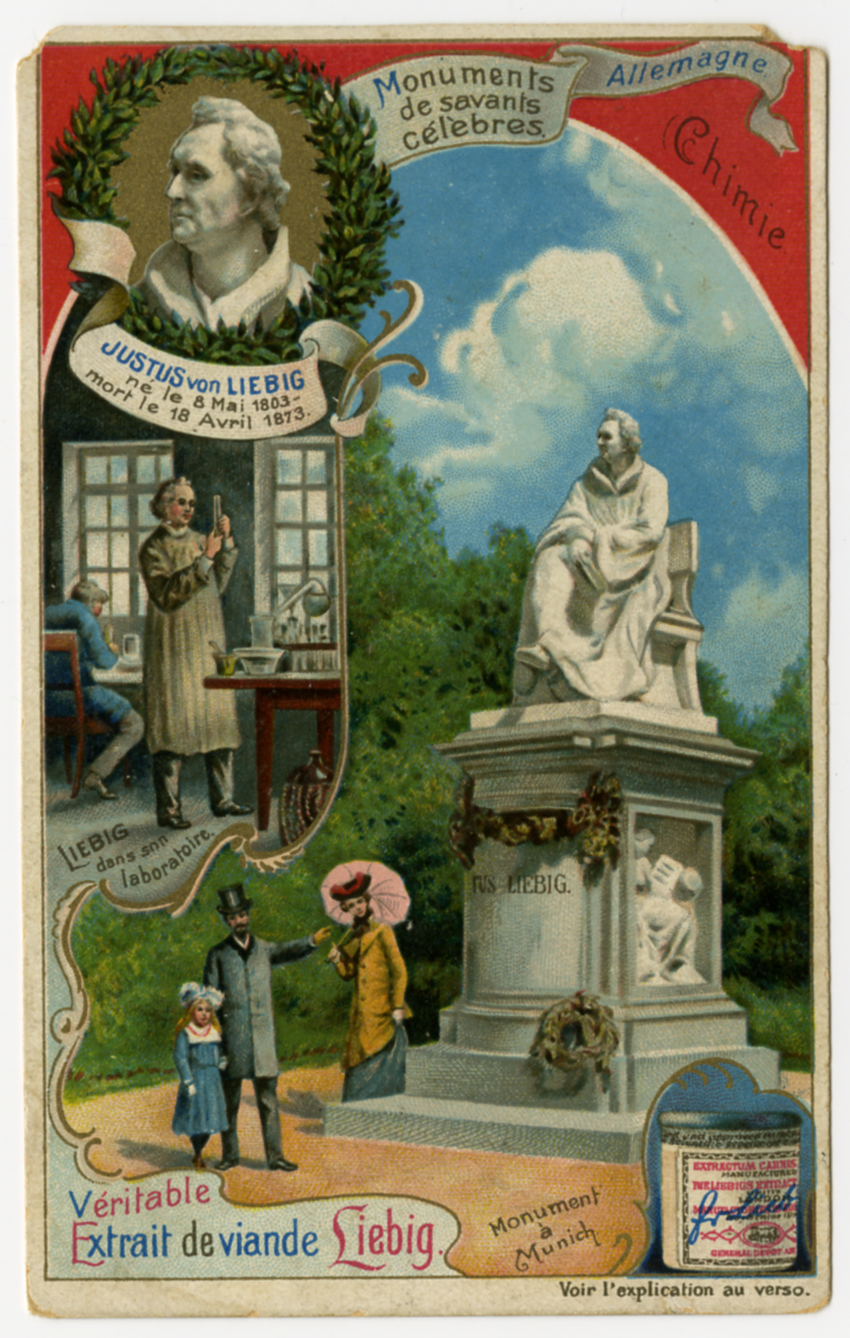
Memorial trading card commemorating Freiherr von Liebig, from Liebig's Extract of Meat Company

In 1847, Justus Freiherr von Liebig developed a concentrated beef extract in hopes of providing a cheap and nutritious meat substitute, Extractum carnis Liebig, for those unable to afford the real thing. His method was to trim the fat from the meat, break the meat into small particles, boil it with water to form a liquid of 6-8% solids, and then stir it over low heat, until it was reduced to a paste of 80% solids. However, in Europe meat was too expensive to profitably supply the necessary raw materials to create the extract.

Freiherr (Baron) von Liebig made his process public, publishing the details in 1847. Liebig clearly stated of his process that "the benefit of it should ... be placed at the command of as large a number of persons as possible by the extension of the manufacture, and consequently a reduction in the cost." A variety of companies produced small batches of meat extract based on Liebig's ideas, often using his name on their products.

In 1862, George Christian Giebert, a young German railway engineer visiting Europe, read Liebig's Familiar Letters on Chemistry. Convinced that the process could be industrialized, he wrote to Liebig to suggest opening a manufacturing plant in South America. Using the flesh of cattle that, before the popularity of canning or freezing meat, would otherwise have been killed for their hides alone, he hoped to produce meat extract at one third of the European cost. He visited Max Joseph von Pettenkofer's Royal Pharmacy in Munich, and Friedrich Mohr's laboratory in Koblenz, where small amounts of extract were being produced.

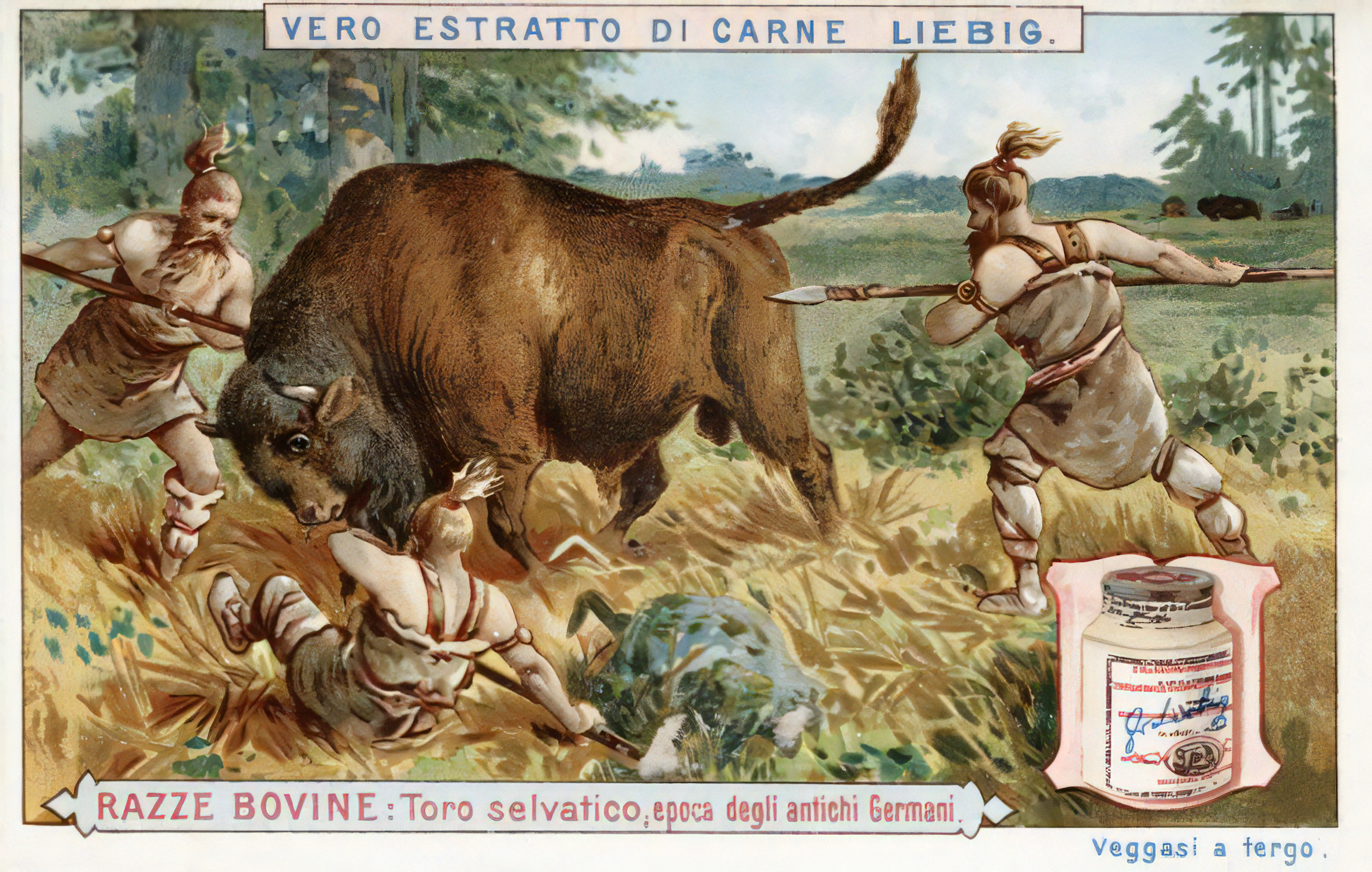
Italian Advertising for Liebig's Extract of Meat, c. 1900

With Liebig's agreement, and the backing of a group of entrepreneurs and ranchers, Giebert established the Societé de Fray Bentos Giebert & Cie., and built a test extraction plant at Villa Independencia, Uruguay, later called Fray Bentos. By the end of 1864, 50,000 pounds of extract worth £12,000 had been exported and sold. In 1865, Giebert offered Liebig a directorship of the company, with an initial cash payment and an annual salary. The Liebig Extract of Meat Company was established on 4 December 1865 in London with a capital of £150,000. Liebig performed and supervised quality control testing on the product arriving to Europe, in Antwerp, and promoted it as "the real" Liebig extract of meat. By partnering with Liebig, Giebert was able to claim that he was the officially sanctioned producer of Liebig's meat extract.

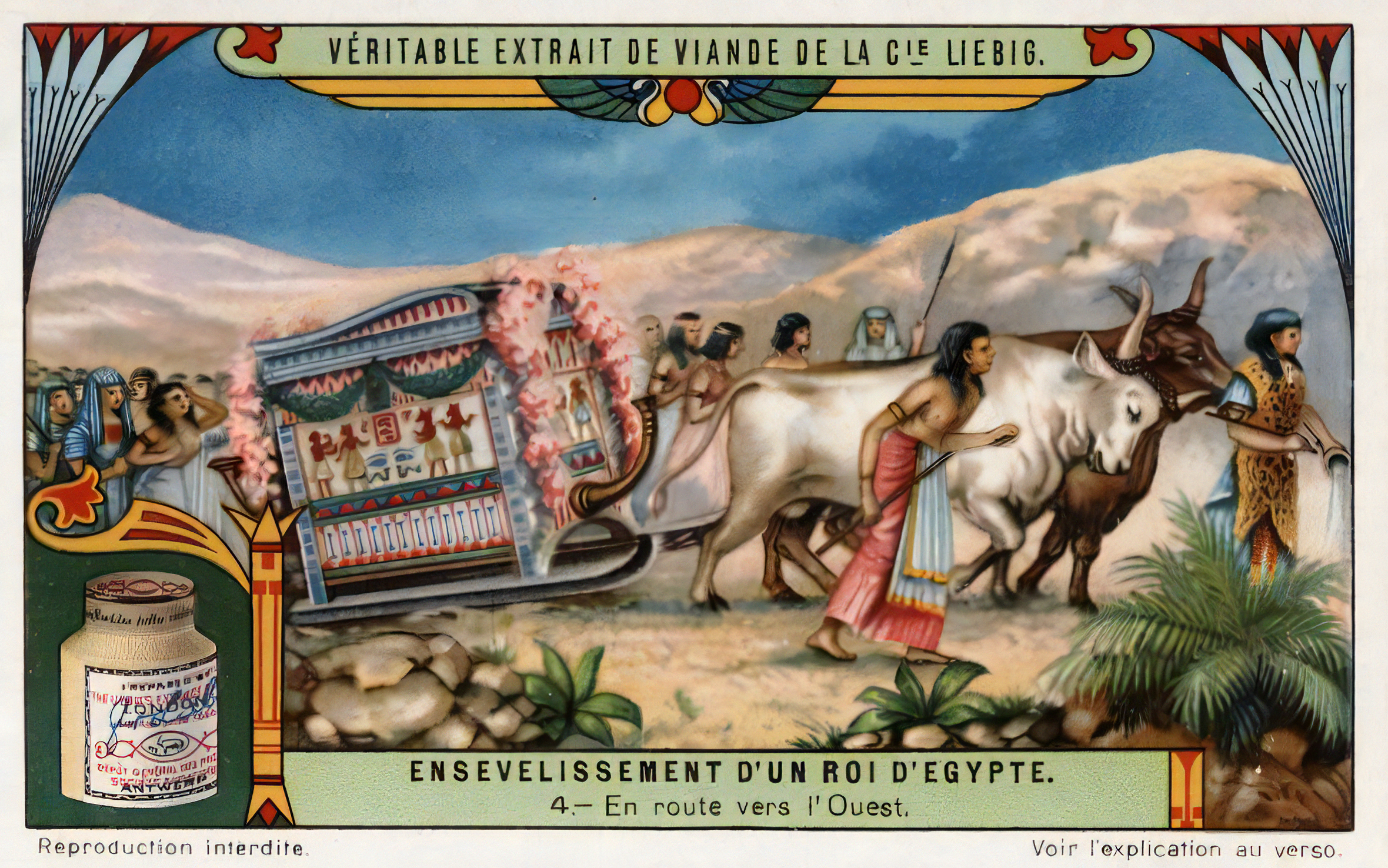
French Advertising for Liebig's Extract of Meat, c. 1900

Other companies also used the name Liebig's Extract of Meat to market meat extracts. In Britain, a competitor's right to use Liebig's name was successfully defended on the grounds that the name had fallen into general use and become a generic term before the creation of any particular company. The judge asserted that "Purchasers must use their eyes", and considered the presentation of the products to be sufficiently different to enable the discriminating consumer to determine which of the products bore Liebig's signature and was supported by Freiherr von Liebig himself. In response, the company adopted the name "LEMCO" in Britain, displayed it prominently on their products "to correct the evil of substitution", and encouraged shoppers specifically to request the new trademark "to protect you from inferior substitutes."

== Products ==
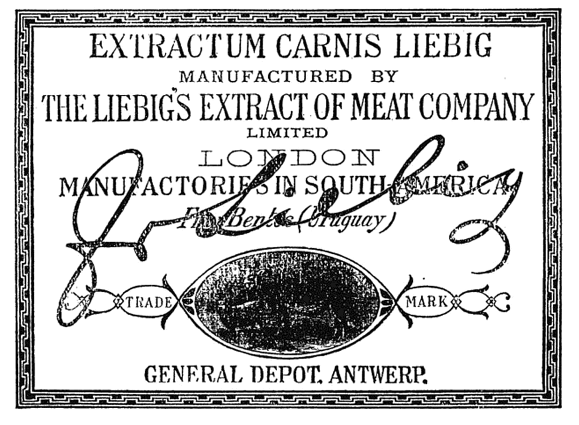
Liebig's 1876 Trademark for Extractum Carnis Liebig.

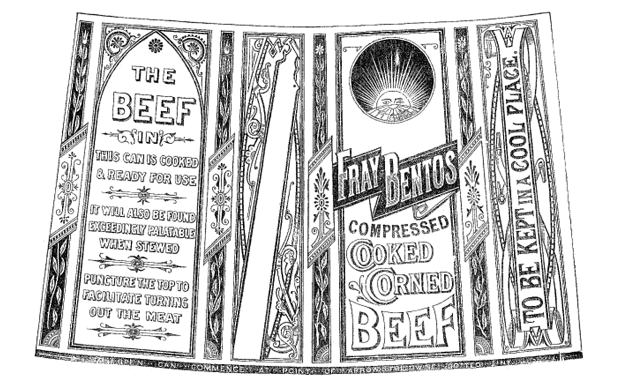
Liebig's 1881 Trademark for Fray Bentos

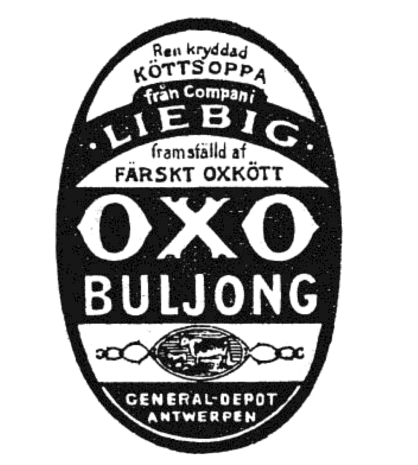
Liebig's 1905 Trademark for OXO

Liebig's meat extract is a molasses-like black spread packaged in an opaque white glass bottle, which contains reduced meat stock and salt (4%). The ratio of meat to meat extract is generally reported to be about 30 to 1: it takes 30 kg of meat to make 1 kg of extract. The extract was originally promoted for its supposed curative powers and nutritional value as a cheap, nutritious alternative to real meat. However (wrote Mark R. Finlay), beginning in mid-1865

the assumption that Liebig's Extract of Meat was extremely nutrituous came under heavy attack. Dozens of articles and analyses were published on the issue... In fact, most studies proved that Liebig's meat extract contained virtually no trace of fats, gelatines and proteins; in brief, it lacked the very basis of meat's nutritive value. Most experts soon agreed that meat extract 'must be placed exceedingly low in the scale of direct or absolute nutrients'.

A German physiologist found that dogs died if fed exclusively on extract of meat. As research brought its nutritional value into question, its convenience and flavourfulness were emphasized, and it was marketed as a comfort food. Liebig and his supporters admitted the extract contained virtually no fats and proteins, but said the purpose of the process was to extract flavour. In a change of marketing strategy, it was promoted as a stimulant.

The product enjoyed immense popularity and became a staple in middle-class European households. By the late 1860s, St. Thomas's Hospital in London reportedly used 12,000 pots per year of the easily digestible substance. By 1875, 500 tonnes of the extract were being produced at the Fray Bentos plant each year. It was recommended for soldiers during the American Civil War for its shelf stability, ease of transport, and ease of use. It was still used by the Allied forces in World War II. Welsh adventurer Sir Henry Morton Stanley valued it on his trip to Africa. It is still sold by Liebig Benelux.

In 1873, Liebig's began producing tinned corned beef, which it sold under the label Fray Bentos. "Fray Bentos" was trademarked by Liebig in 1881 to market "Fray Bentos Compressed Cooked Corned Beef". With the introduction of freezer units, the company was eventually able to produce and export frozen and chilled raw meat as well. The amount of food processed and shipped around the world caused the town of Fray Bentos to be called "The Kitchen of the World".

Fray Bentos canned meats, now owned by Baxters, are still sold in Europe. The brand also offers meat pies, which have been manufactured since 1958.

The British tonic wine Wincarnis originally contained Liebig's meat extract and was initially called Liebig's Extract of Meat and Malt Wine. Beaufoy & Co of Lambeth also produced a meat and malt tonic wine (with quinine) using Liebig's meat extract.

The company also worked with English chemist Henry Enfield Roscoe to develop a cheaper meat extract product which it commercialized some years after Liebig's death. "Oxo" was registered as a trade mark in many countries. Originally a liquid, Oxo was released as a bouillon cube in 1911.

Liebig also produced a line of biological products under the Oxoid name (starting in 1924), in particular glandular extracts and later dehydrated culture media.

== Fray Bentos industrial complex ==
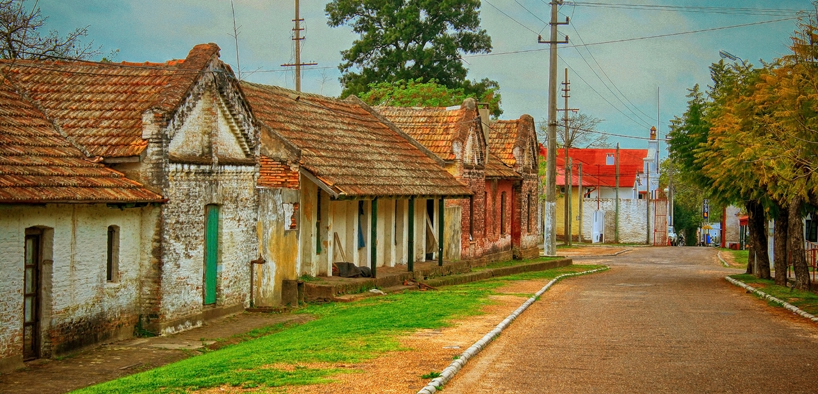
Barrio Obrero Anglo (workers neighbourhood)

The works and yards at the Fray Bentos factory complex in Fray Bentos in Uruguay ranked among the largest industrial complexes in South America and helped usher in the industrial revolution there. The city of Fray Bentos grew simultaneously with the factory. The plant played a major role in the development of Uruguay's cattle sector, which is still one of the country's main sources of export products. It attracted many European immigrants and, in its heyday, had 5,000 employees. It is said that an animal was processed every five minutes. Every part of the animal was used.

The Liebig Football Club of Fray Bentos, later renamed Club Atlético Anglo, was established in 1905.

In 1964, a typhoid outbreak in Aberdeen was traced to Fray Bentos corned beef. Investigations into the 1964 Aberdeen typhoid outbreak revealed that the cooling water used in the canning process at the plant was not being consistently chlorinated. Meanwhile, Britain's entry into the Common Market affected trade patterns. These factors combined had a serious negative impact on sales, and, in 1971, the complex was given to the Uruguayan government. The plant's viability never recovered and production ceased completely in 1979, a major blow to the area's residents.

== Corporate history ==
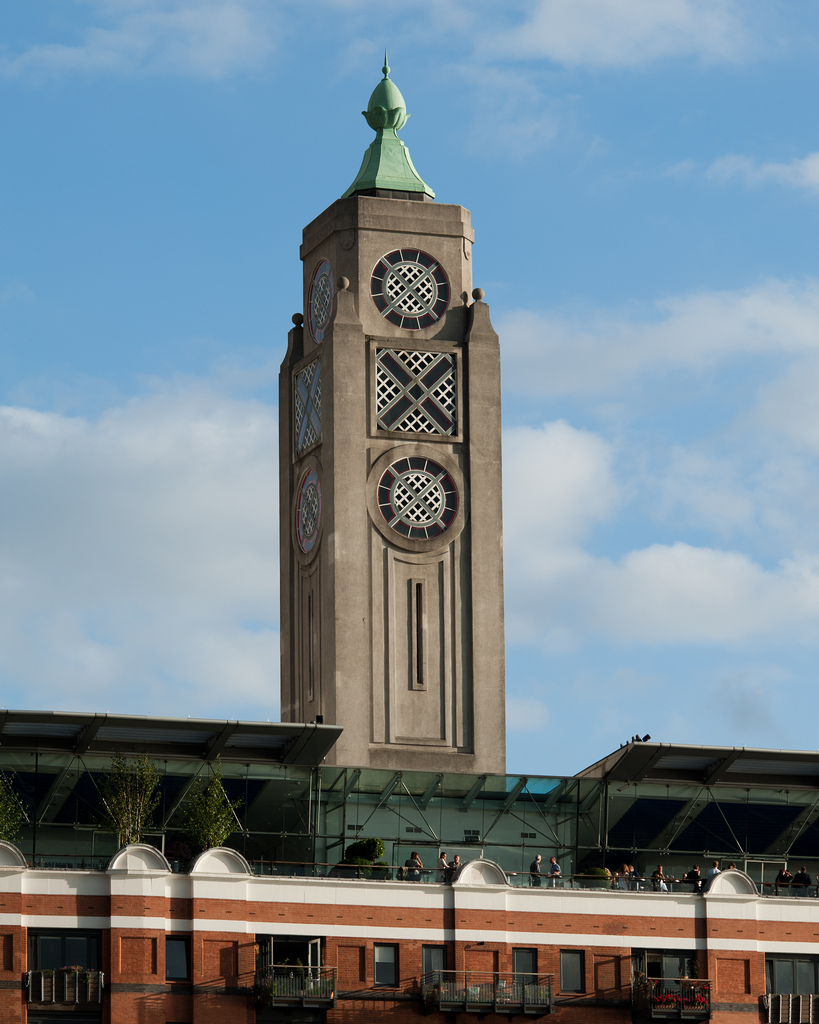
Oxo Tower, London

In the 1920s, the Liebig's Extract of Meat Company acquired the Oxo Tower Wharf on the south bank of the river Thames in London. There they erected a factory, demolishing most of the original building and preserving and building upon the riverside frontage.

The Liebig Extract of Meat Company was acquired by the Vestey Group in 1924 and the factory was renamed Frigorífico Anglo del Uruguay, also known as El Anglo. The company's assets included over 2-3 million hectares of farm land and herds of cattle in Argentina, Uruguay, Paraguay, Southern Rhodesia, Kenya and South Africa. Liebig merged with Brooke Bond in 1968, which was in turn acquired by Unilever in 1984; Campbell's acquired Liebig, Oxo, and several European brands from Unilever in 2001, Campbell later sold the UK operation to Premier Foods in 2006. The rest of Campbell European soup business was sold to CVC Capital Partners and became Continental Foods in 2013. Continental Foods was later acquired by Spanish food company GBFoods in 2019.

Liebig division in France was separated from Brooke Bond Liebig in 1983 and merged with Maille as SEGMA Liebig Maille which was owned by Danone. Danone later broke up SEGMA and sold Liebig France to Campbell Soup Company in 1997.

In the meantime, Oxoid moved to its own manufacturing facility in Basingstoke in 1974 with the sole manufacturing site for the company of microbiological culture media. Oxoid was purchased by Unilever and joined their Medical Products group as Unipath. In 1997, Oxoid Limited became independent through management buy-out and in 2000, PPMVentures, a subsidiary of Prudential Plc, bought a majority stake. In 2004, Oxoid Ltd, with revenues of £120 million, was purchased by Fisher Scientific with the Oxoid board of directors sharing £30 million in cash and company shares. Following the merger of Fisher Scientific with Thermo Electron Corporation in November 2006, Oxoid Ltd (along with Remel Inc) became the Microbiology Division of Thermo Fisher Scientific. In 2026, Thermo Fisher announced that its Microbiology Division, of which Oxoid Limited is part of would be divested and sold to the European Venture Capital group, Astorg.

== Museo de la Revolución Industrial ==
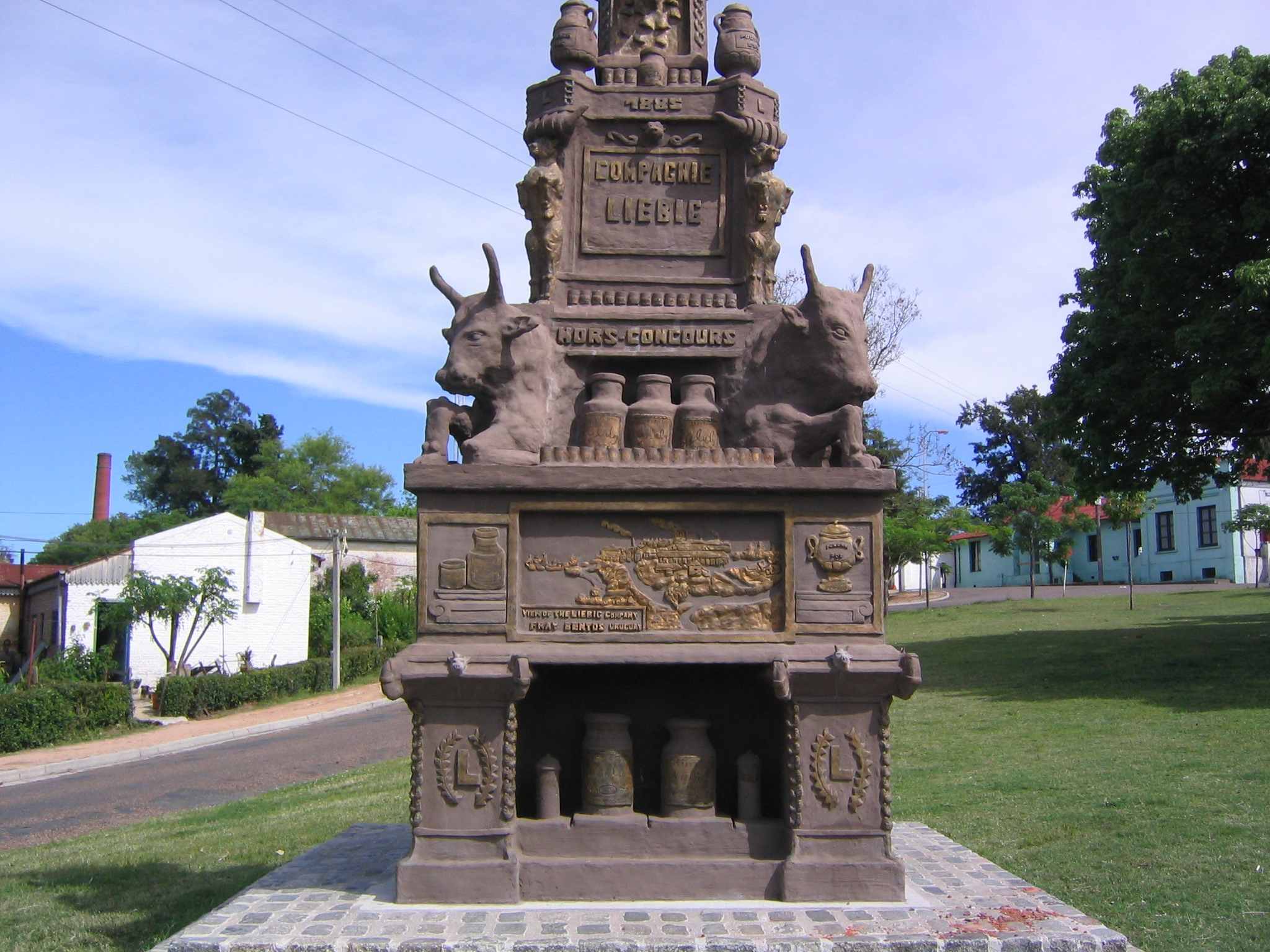
Liebig monument, Fray Bentos, Uruguay

The Museo de la Revolución Industrial (Museum of the Industrial Revolution) is housed in the former works and yards at Fray Bentos. Thousands of people worked in the Frigorífico Anglo del Uruguay (El Anglo), which increased and diversified the use of agricultural products. When it was shut down, the municipality decided to create a museum which would display the original machinery, as well as social and cultural artifacts of the technological revolution in Fray Bentos. Dr. Sue Millar, president of the International Cultural Tourism Committee (ICOMOS), said: “Thus there is the chance to save time and massive expenditure on conservation, to retain the exceptional scope and variety of the 19th and 20th century British manufacturing and engineering machinery.” The site has been proposed as a possible UNESCO World Heritage Site.

The museum is open for tourism and education, displaying the machinery used in the meat and extract of meat processing, the buildings, an 1893 Merryweather water pumping machine, a complete canning plant, a meat-cooking plant, and laboratory full of chemicals and chemistry jars, flasks and stoves. The museum collection contains hundred of photos and glass negatives detailing working life at Liebig's.

== Cookbooks ==
Liebig's company worked with popular cookery writers in various countries to popularize their products. German cookery writer Henriette Davidis wrote recipes for Improved and Economic Cookery and other cookbooks. Katharina Prato wrote an Austria-Hungarian recipe book, Die Praktische Verwerthung Kochrecepte (1879). Hannah M. Young was commissioned in England to write a cookbook for the Liebig Company. Her popular cookbook, The Liebig Company's Practical Cookery Book, was published in 1893. In the United States, Maria Parloa extolled the benefits of Liebig's extract. Following a product name change Eva Tuite published “Lemco Dishes for all Seasons, containing 208 recipes for each month, with invalid dishes, breakfast dishes, sweets and 75 menus for breakfasts, lunches and Dinners in circa 1900.

== Trading card sets ==
Colourful calendars and trading cards were also marketed to popularize the product. Liebig produced many illustrated advertising products: table cards, menu cards, children's games, free trading card sets, calendars, posters, poster stamps, paper and other toys. In 1872, they began to include sets of trading cards featuring stories, historical tidbits, geographic tidbits, and so on. Many famous artists were contacted to design those series of cards, which were first produced using true lithography, then litho chromo, chromolithography, and finally offset printing. The cards remain popular with collectors and are often collected in albums.

=== Chimistes Celebres trading card set ===
A set usually consisted of six cards, grouped around a particular theme. This example set includes chemists both ancient and modern. One card features Liebig and his laboratory of students.

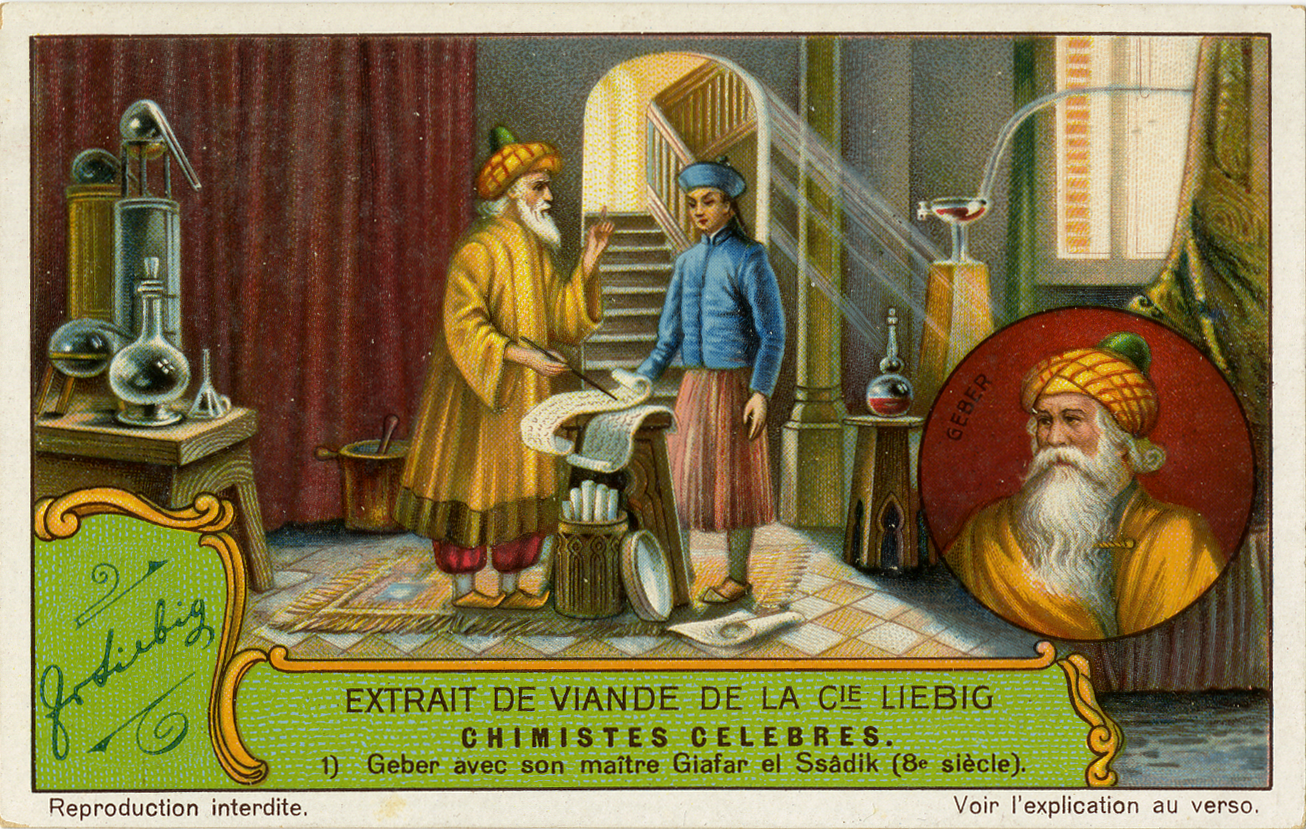
Geber (Jābir ibn Hayyān)

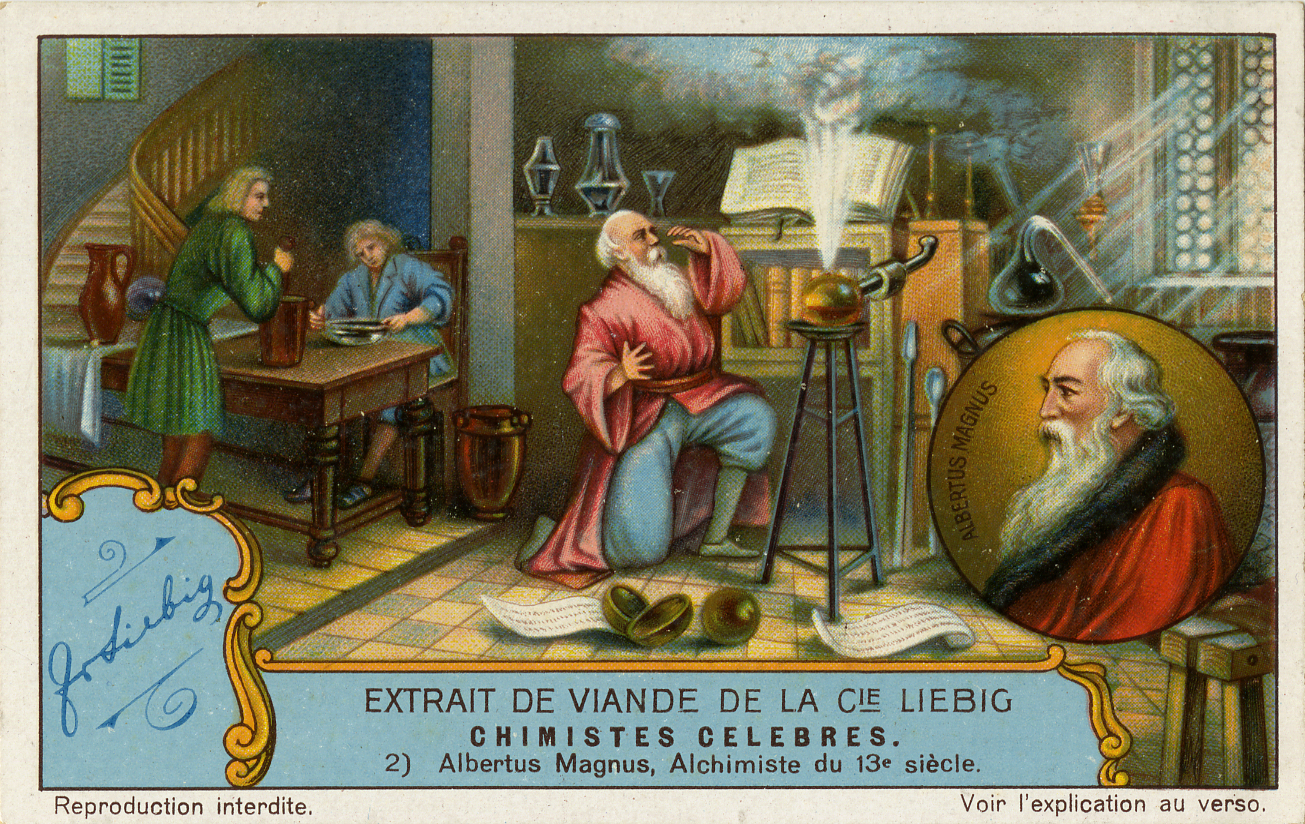
Albertus Magnus

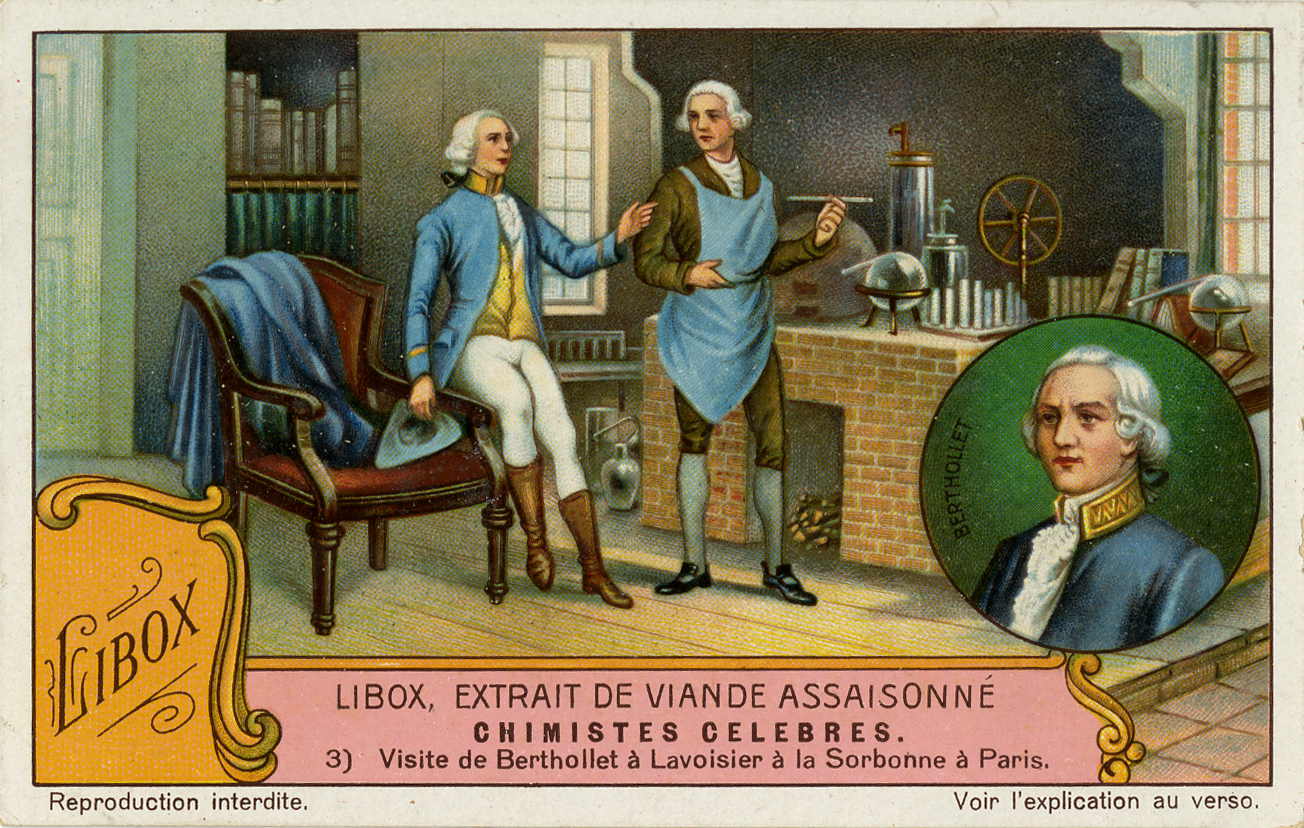
Antoine Lavoisier and Claude Louis Berthollet

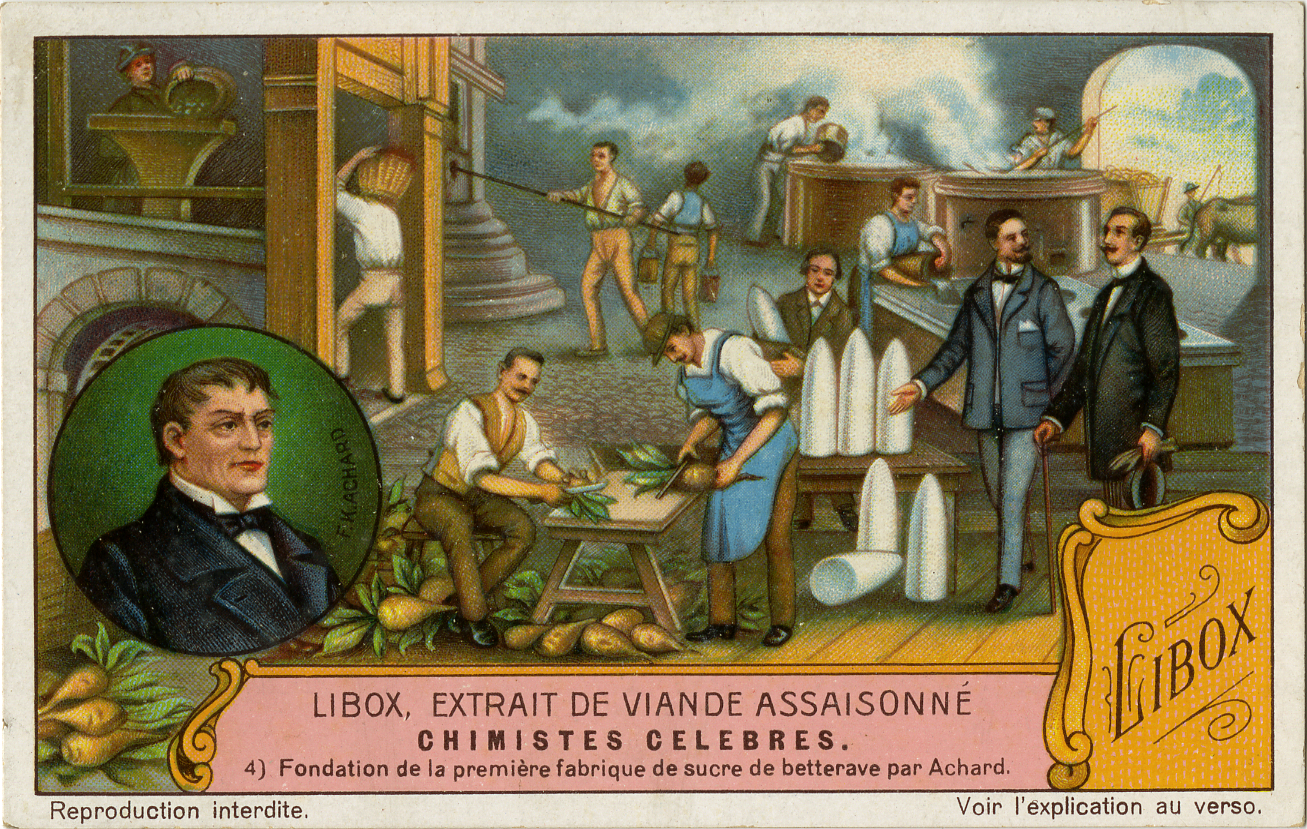
Frédéric-Charles Achard

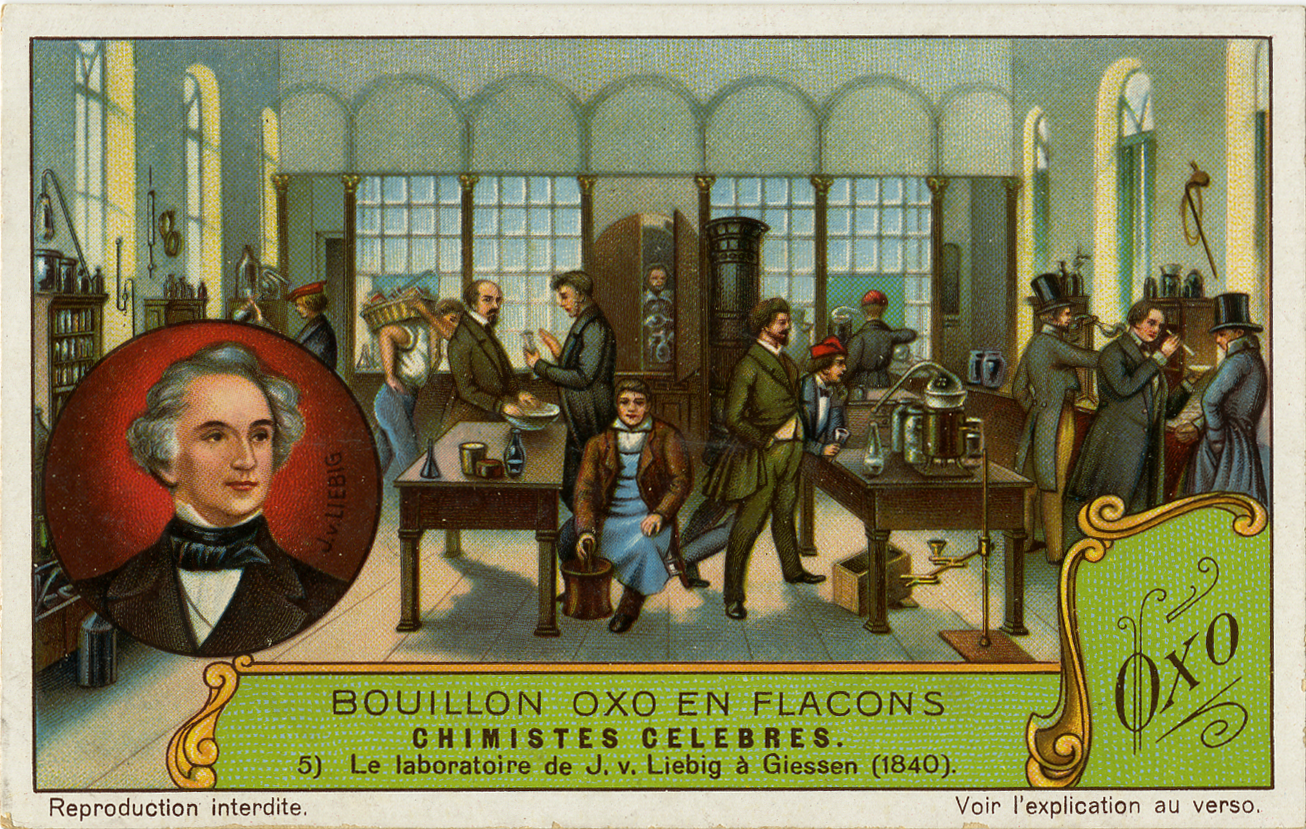
Justus Freiherr von Liebig's Laboratory in Giessen

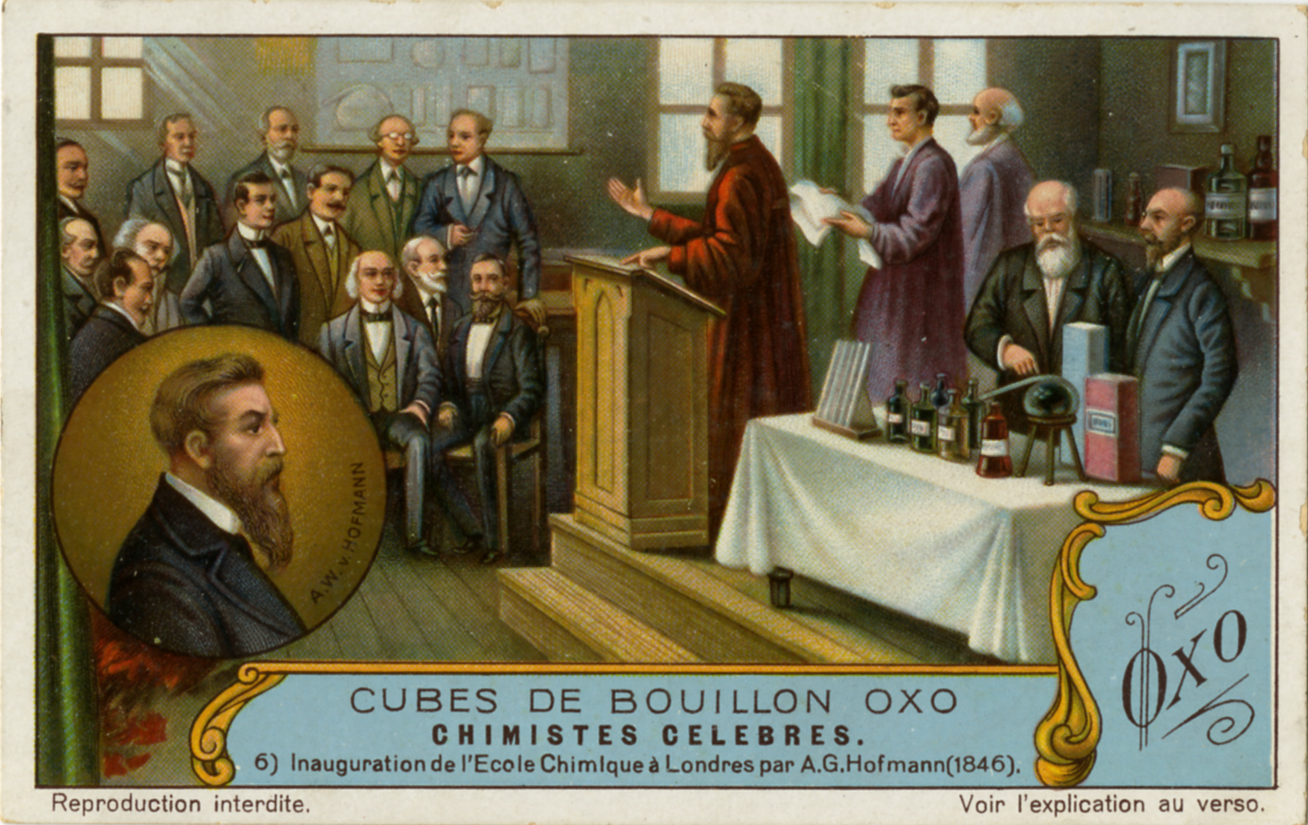
A.G. Hofmann at the Inauguration of the School of Chemistry in London
