= Obliterate! =

1981 video game

- Developer(s): Bill Wadsworth, Gary Zabel
- Publisher(s): Mercury 332
- Platform(s): Prestel
- Release: 1981, 1982
- Genre(s): Simulation

Obliterate! is a 1981 video game published by Mercury 332 that ran on the Prestel online service. The player takes the role of the commander of the fictional Royal Navy submarine HMS Mercury 332 and is given the mission of sinking the Argentine flagship, the Frey Bentos.

The game gained worldwide notoriety and was taken off the service. It once again became a topic of discussion after the sinking of the ARA General Belgrano by HMS Conqueror during the Falklands War.

== History ==
Prestel was an early videotext service offered by British Telecom starting in 1979. Users normally used the service using a television and set-top box which included a simple keypad for entering commands. The data was paged, in a fashion similar to modern web pages, and could be called up either through navigation buttons in a page-to-page way, or by entering page numbers or from menus. In spite of these technical limitations, the service soon offered a number of simple video games that were page-based. By 1982, the service had about 18,000 regular users in the UK and about 5,000 more in the United States using an emulator on the Apple II.

Obliterate! was written by Bill Wadsworth and Gary Zabel in early 1981, long before the opening of the Falklands War. Zabel was the editor of Mercury 332, the Prestel publishing division of the St. Regis Newspapers based in Bolton, Greater Manchester. At the time of its initial release, it was a generic submarine game without any nationalities mentioned. When the war opened on 2 April 1982, the authors quickly updated the text to suggest it was taking place in the Falklands, making it "more topical and fun", selecting a Spanish-sounding name for the enemy ship based on a UK brand of canned meat (itself named for a port city in Uruguay) and the submarine based on their own company. The updated version went live on 7 April.

Within days, it was being mentioned in the press in both the UK and US. It gained widespread notoriety when Member of Parliament Bob Cryer commented on the press coverage and described the game as encouraging people "to see war as nothing more than a game." In the Daily Mirror, Napier Crookenden stated "it sounds in appalling taste." The Guardian noted: "I'm afraid there's a terrible outbreak of jingoism in Britain. Have you heard about the dotty old lady in Wales who's dialing numbers at random in Argentina and singing 'Rule Britannia'? This game won't be the last of it."

This initial coverage led to other newspapers picking up the story and creating a press frenzy with worldwide front-page coverage. The constant press coverage led the authors to pull the game off the service. (Note: The exact date is not mentioned, but "five days" and "a week" are, which would be sometime around 12 April.) This led to another frenzy among Prestel users who demanded it be brought back immediately. Mercury 332 published a newsletter that summer that used the notoriety, saying "Prestel is a household name... due to our game!", and quoting Zabel as noting "I believe it has gained more publicity for Prestel than any marketing campaign.

Yet another round of press coverage followed the next month after the 2 May sinking of the ARA General Belgrano, which clear similarities to the action in the game. Zabel described the coincidence as "spooky".

== Description ==
After a preamble in which the background story is explained, the actions starts with a text-based view of the scene through the periscope. The player is first asked to estimate the range to the target, entering 1 through 10 for the corresponding number of 1000 yard increments, and then the speed of the ship. When entered, a new display appears showing the results, either a hit or miss. In the case of a miss, the user is given the option of a second try, but no third, a second miss resulted in the Bentos sinking your submarine.
