= Luis Alberto Solari =

- Born: October 17, 1918; Fray Bentos, Uruguay
- Died: October 13, 1993 (aged 74); Montevideo, Uruguay
- Known for: Painter, printmaking, engraving

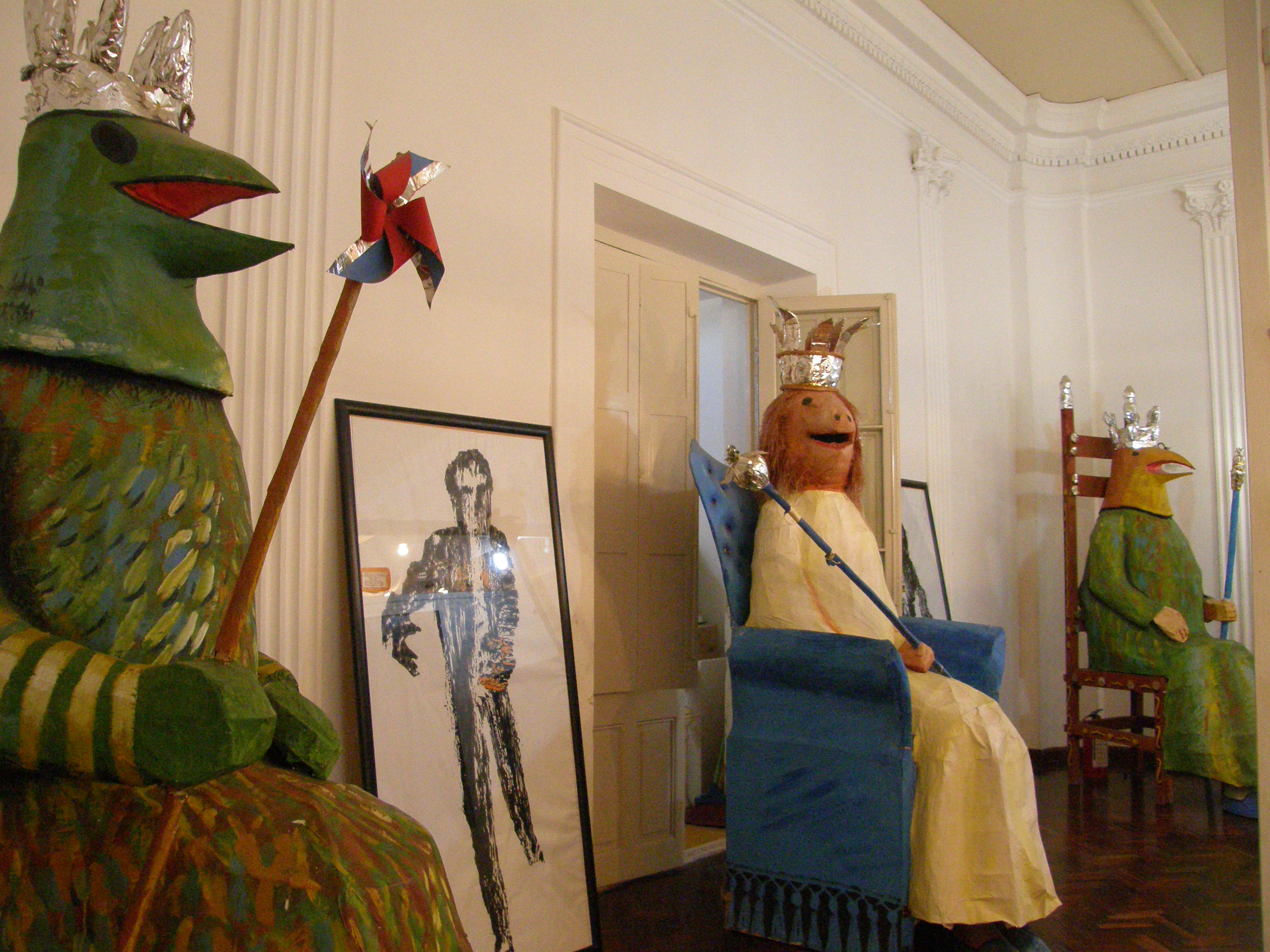
Some works of Luis Alberto Solari in Fray Bentos

Luis Alberto Solari (1918–1993) was a Uruguayan painter and engraver.

== Background ==
Solari moved to Montevideo in 1934 to study at the Circulo de Bellas Artes with Professor William Laborde between 1934 and 1937. He pursued his particular interest in etching in 1952 during a three-month course at the l'Ecole Superieure des Beaux Arts in Paris with Professor Eduard GOERGEN. From 1967 to 1969, he took advanced courses at the Pratt Graphic Center and the New York Graphic Workshop under the Brazilian Roberto De Lamonica and the Uruguayan Luis Camnitzer.

== Exhibitions ==
Solari has exhibited at the Biennial of Graphic Arts in Santiago de Chile, Buenos Aires, Cali, San Juan, Florence, Kraków, Ljubljana, Frechen, Leipzig, Vienna, Norway, Finland, Bradford, Biella, Segovia and Japan.

== Notable works ==
His most notable works, including mezzotint and acrylic paintings, are of human figures with anthropomorphic animal masks. Their costumes reveal rather than conceal their true identities.

== Prizes ==
Amongst Solari's many prizes and distinctions were first prizes for drawing at the Salón Nacional de Bellas Artes in Montevideo in 1955 and 1964, the first prize for painting there in 1965 and the gold medal for printmaking at the first Bienal de Artes Gráficas in Cali, Colombia, in 1977. In 1989 the Museo Luis Alberto Solari opened in the city of Fray Bentos, Uruguay, showing his works and promoting fine arts in the region.
