= Bentos =

Bentos may refer to:

- Alejandro de la Cruz Bentos, an Argentine footballer
- Gustavo Bentos, a Uruguayan footballer
- Benthos, the community of marine organisms which live on, in, or near the seabed, also known as the benthic zone

== See also ==
- Fray Bentos (disambiguation)
