= Miguel Young Theatre, Fray Bentos =

Theatre in Fray Bentos, Uruguay

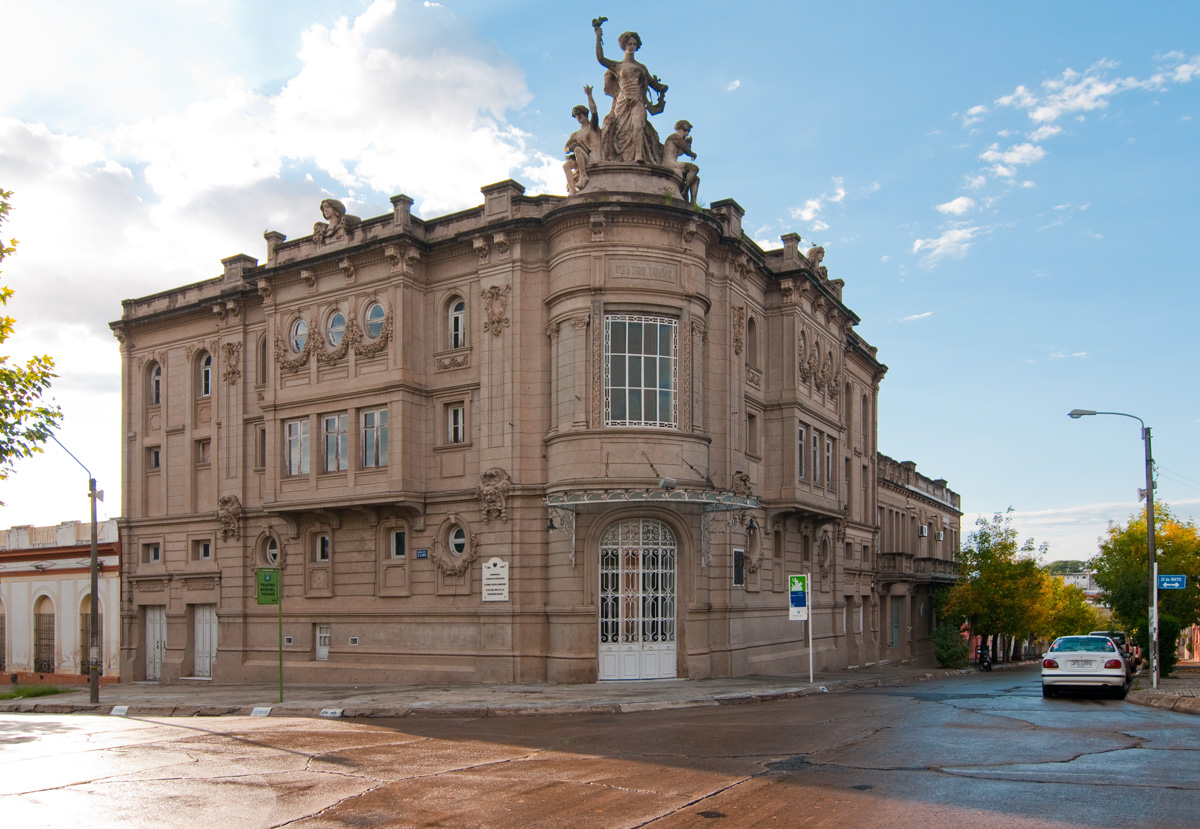
View of the Miguel Young Theatre

The Miguel Young Theatre (Spanish: Teatro Miguel Young) is a theatre located in the city of Fray Bentos, Uruguay.

Built in 1913 with plans of Antonio Llambías de Olivar. In 2012 it was refurbished in time to celebrate its centennial.
