= Federico Elduayen =

Uruguayan footballer (born 1977)

Federico Elduayén
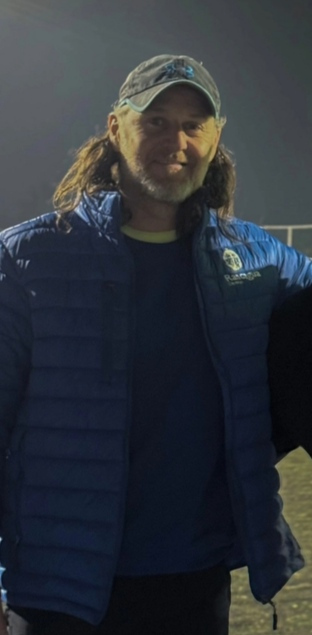
- Elduayen with O'Higgins in 2025

Personal information
- Full name: Federico Martín Elduayén Saldaña
- Date of birth: June 25, 1977 (age 49)
- Place of birth: Fray Bentos, Uruguay
- Height: 1.81 m (5 ft 11 1/2 in)
- Position: Goalkeeper

Youth career
- Peñarol

Senior career*
Years	Team	Apps	(Gls)
1999–2005	Peñarol	95	(0)
2005–2009	Universidad de Concepción	118	(0)
2010	O'Higgins	35	(0)
2011	Unión Española	13	(0)
2012–2013	Universitario de Sucre	36	(0)
2013–2015	Guabirá	36	(0)

International career
2002	Uruguay	1	(0)

Managerial career
- 2016–2017: Coquimbo Unido (gk coach)
- 2018–2019: Audax Italiano (gk coach)
- 2020–2021: Coquimbo Unido (gk coach)
- 2021: Deportes Antofagasta (gk coach)
- 2022: Audax Italiano (gk coach)
- 2023: Curicó Unido (gk coach)
- 2024: Universidad de Concepción (gk coach)
- 2025–: O'Higgins (gk coach)
- * Club domestic league appearances and goals

Federico Martín Elduayén Saldaña (born June 25, 1977) is an Uruguayan football former goalkeeper. His nickname is "Vikingo" (Viking).

== Career ==
=== Club career ===
He began his career in the youth squads of Peñarol. He made his professional debut in 1999, in the Copa Mercosur defending Peñarol against Vasco Da Gama in Brazil. Elduayén participated in six straight Copa Libertadores editions with Peñarol from 2000 to 2005.

He was the team's starting goalkeeper until 2005 when he lost his job and moved to Universidad de Concepción in Chile. Ever since joining the Chilean side he became the starting goalkeeper there. He renewed his contract until the end of the 2009 season. The following year Elduayén transferred to O'Higgins where he played for one season, before signing with Unión Española. In 2012, he landed in Bolivia and signing for Universitario de Sucre.

=== International career ===
Elduayen made one appearance for the Uruguay national football team and was part of the squad for the 2002 FIFA World Cup.

== Coaching career ==
Elduayen has developed a career as a goalkeeping coach for clubs in Chile such as Coquimbo Unido, Audax Italiano, O'Higgins, among others.

== Titles ==
Season	Team	Title
Copa Chile 2008-09	Universidad de Concepción	Copa Chile
