= Walter Pelletti =

Uruguayan footballer (born 1966)

Wálter Pelletti
Personal information
- Full name: Wálter Luis Pelletti Vezzoso
- Date of birth: 31 May 1966 (age 60)
- Place of birth: Fray Bentos, Uruguay
- Height: 1.72 m (5 ft 8 in)
- Position: Forward

Senior career*
| Years | Team | Apps | (Gls) |
| 1986 | El Tanque Sisley | | |
| 1987 | Antofagasta | | |
| 1988 | Montevideo Wanderers | | |
| 1989–1991 | Castellón | 55 | (2) |
| 1992–1996 | Huracán | 137 | (22) |
| 1996–1997 | Banfield | 23 | (2) |
| 1997 | Argentinos Juniors | 8 | (0) |
| 1998–2001 | Montevideo Wanderers | | |
| 2001–2002 | ASM Oran | | |

International career
| 1992–1993 | Uruguay | 8 | (0) |
Medal record
Representing Uruguay
Copa América
| Winner | 1987 Argentina |
- * Club domestic league appearances and goals

Wálter Luis Pelletti Vezzoso (born 31 May 1966) is a former Uruguayan footballer who played as a forward. He was an unused member of squad which won 1987 Copa América.

== Career ==
Peletti played for Huracán, Banfield and Argentinos Juniors in the Primera División de Argentina. Peletti made 15 appearances for the senior Uruguay national football team from 1987 to 1993.
