= Frigorífico Anglo del Uruguay =

Fray Bentos Industrial Landscape
UNESCO World Heritage Site
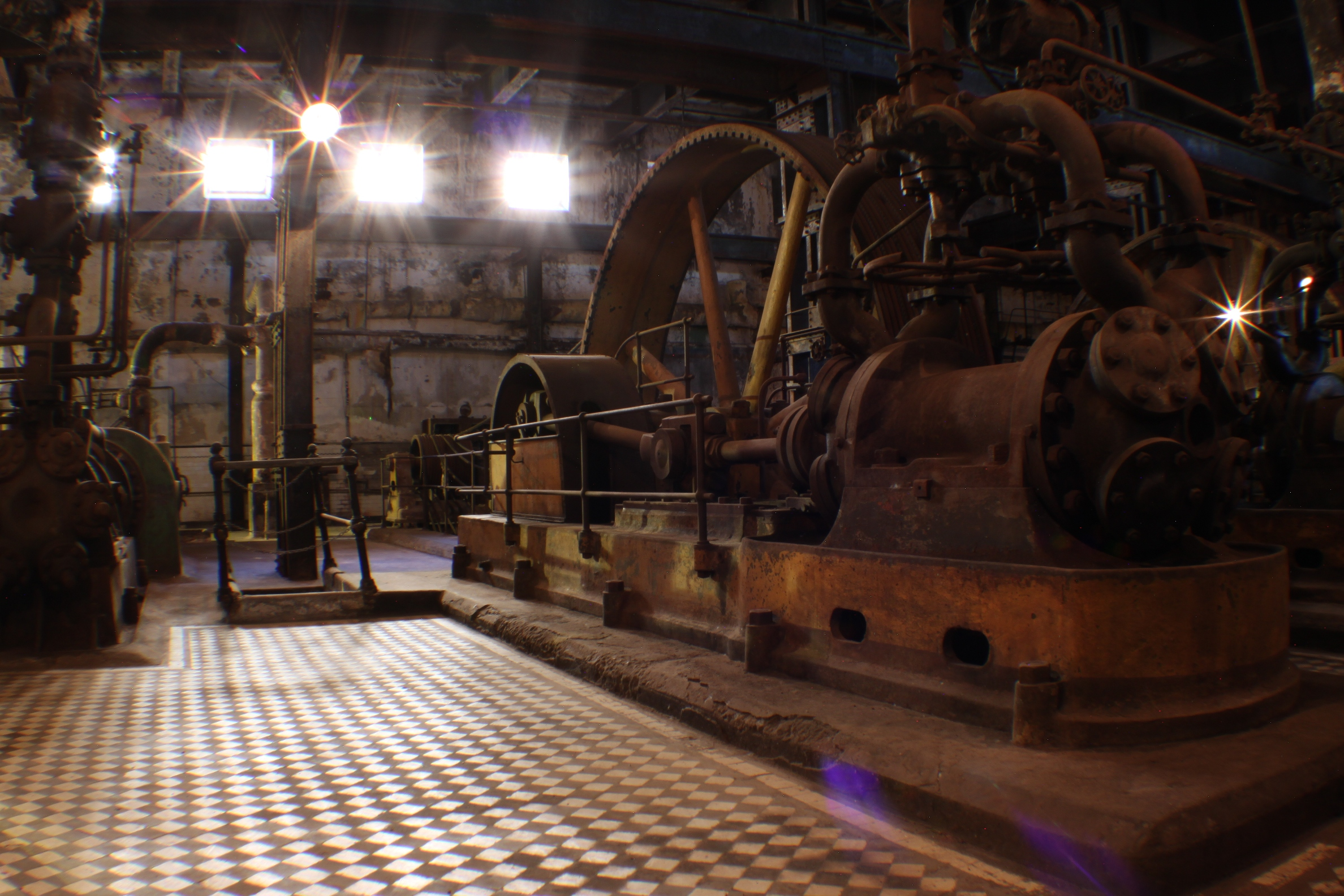
- Old compressor

- Location within Uruguay
- Location: Fray Bentos, Río Negro Department, Uruguay
- Criteria: Cultural: (ii), (iv)
- Reference: 1464
- Inscription: 2015 (39th Session)
- Area: 273.8 ha (677 acres)
- Buffer zone: 2,127.7 ha (5,258 acres)
- Coordinates: 33°7′4″S 58°19′54″W

The Frigorífico Anglo del Uruguay was a meatpacking plant located at Fray Bentos, Uruguay, on the Uruguay River bank.

In 1924, the Vestey group purchased the old facilities of Liebig Extract of Meat Company and the production went under a new name. Products were sold in Europe under the brand name Fray Bentos.

During its peak period, El Anglo had 5,000 workers whose ranks included English, Belgians, Russians, Spanish and Italians. It finally closed in 1979 after Europe and the United States had cut back their purchases from Latin America. Small brick houses with thick walls running along the river's edge in Fray Bentos form the "Barrio Anglo," a city-within-a-city where meatpacking workers lived that featured a hospital, a school, a social club and a football squad.

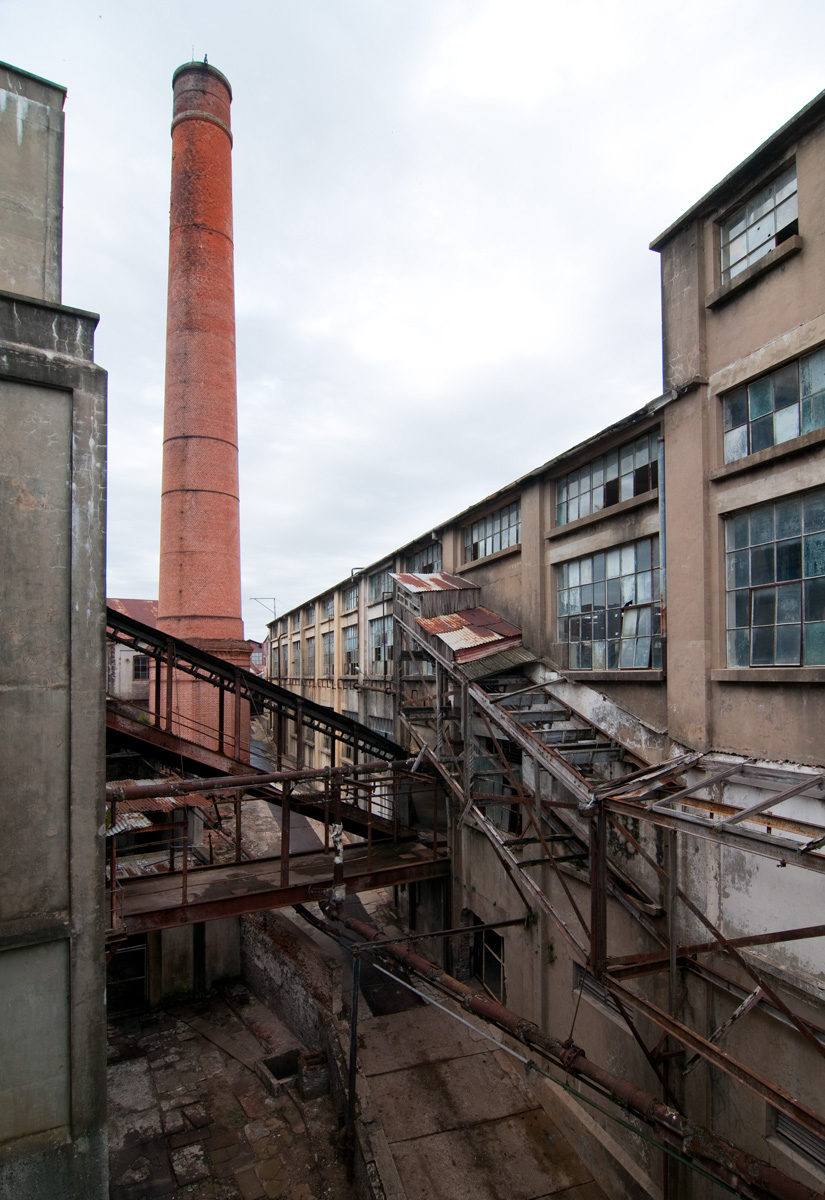
