= Laureles F.C. =

Uruguayan football club

- Full name: Laureles Fútbol Club
- Nickname(s): Albiverdes, Raneros
- Founded: September 6, 1907
- Ground: Parque Pablo Enrique Abbate; Fray Bentos, Uruguay
- Capacity: 1,200
- Chairman: Sebastián Roldán
- Manager: ?
- League: Liga Departamental de Fútbol de Río Negro
- Website: Official website

Laureles Fútbol Club is a football club from Fray Bentos in Uruguay.

It was established on September 6, 1907. In 1913 it joined the Liga Departamental de Fútbol de Río Negro.

The "Laureles" is notable for its secular rivalry with the Club Atlético Anglo.
