= Club Atlético Anglo =

Uruguayan football club

Anglo
- Full name: Club Atlético Anglo
- Nickname(s): Albirrojos
- Founded: June 1, 1907
- Ground: Parque Anglo; Fray Bentos, Uruguay
- Capacity: 1,800
- Chairman: Davino Giustti
- Manager: Miguel Cerrilla
- League: Liga Departamental de Fútbol de Río Negro
- Website: Official website

Club Atlético Anglo is a football club from Fray Bentos in Uruguay.

Established on June 1, 1907, with the denomination Liebig Football Club, changed later.

On June 13, 1912, together with the Fray Bentos F.C. was established the Liga Departamental de Fútbol de Río Negro.

The "Anglo" is notable for its secular rivalry with the Laureles F.C.
