= Fray Bentos (food brand) =

British food brand

Fray Bentos steak and kidney pies, as sold in the UK in 2015

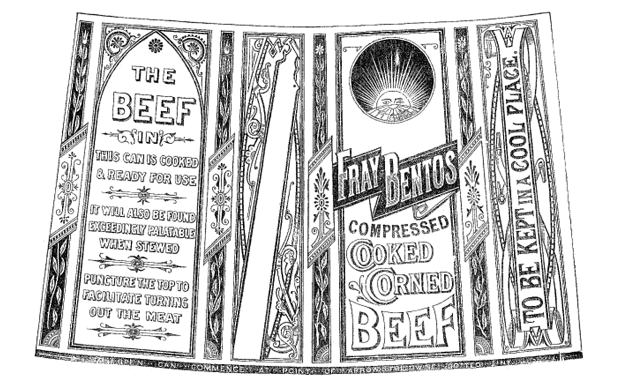
The original Fray Bentos trade mark, 1881

Fray Bentos is a food brand associated with tinned processed meat products, originally corned beef and later meat pies. The brand has been sold in the United Kingdom, other European countries, and Australia. Founded in the UK in the 1860s, the name is derived from the port of Fray Bentos in Uruguay where all of the company's products were processed and packaged until the 1960s. Fray Bentos was registered as a UK trademark in 1881. The brand in the UK is now owned by Baxters, which manufactures the product range in Scotland. Campbell's manufactures and sells Fray Bentos branded steak and kidney pies in Australia.

== Current position ==
The Fray Bentos brand is known for the manufacture and sale in the UK of a range of tinned meat pies such as steak and kidney and minced beef and onion. Since 2011, the brand in the UK has been owned by Baxters, who manufacture Fray Bentos products at their site at Fochabers in Scotland. In addition to meat pies, the range includes tinned meat puddings and tinned meatballs as well as microwaveable meat-based pasta and rice dishes.

Fray Bentos beef and onion pie in Norfolk, England in 2022

The sales of Fray Bentos products, once a staple in the UK and some European countries, had declined in recent decades and, in 2011, it was reported that sales had been flat at around £30 million per year for the previous ten years. Tinned meat products, including Fray Bentos, now have a down-market image. According to the Financial Times, Fray Bentos products "may engender sneers" but they also have a "cult following" in the UK. It was reported in 2020 that sales of canned foods including Fray Bentos increased during Covid. Baxters describes Fray Bentos as "an iconic British brand".

Campbell's Soup Company manufactures and sells steak and kidney pies in Australia under the Fray Bentos brand name.

== History ==
=== Liebig: 1873–1924 ===
In 1865, Liebig's Extract of Meat Company was founded in Britain by German chemist Justus von Liebig. The company established a factory in Uruguay to manufacture a beef extract product that would later be sold under the name Oxo. In 1873, the factory began manufacturing tinned corned beef, which was sold in Britain under the name Fray Bentos, the town in Uruguay where the factory was located.

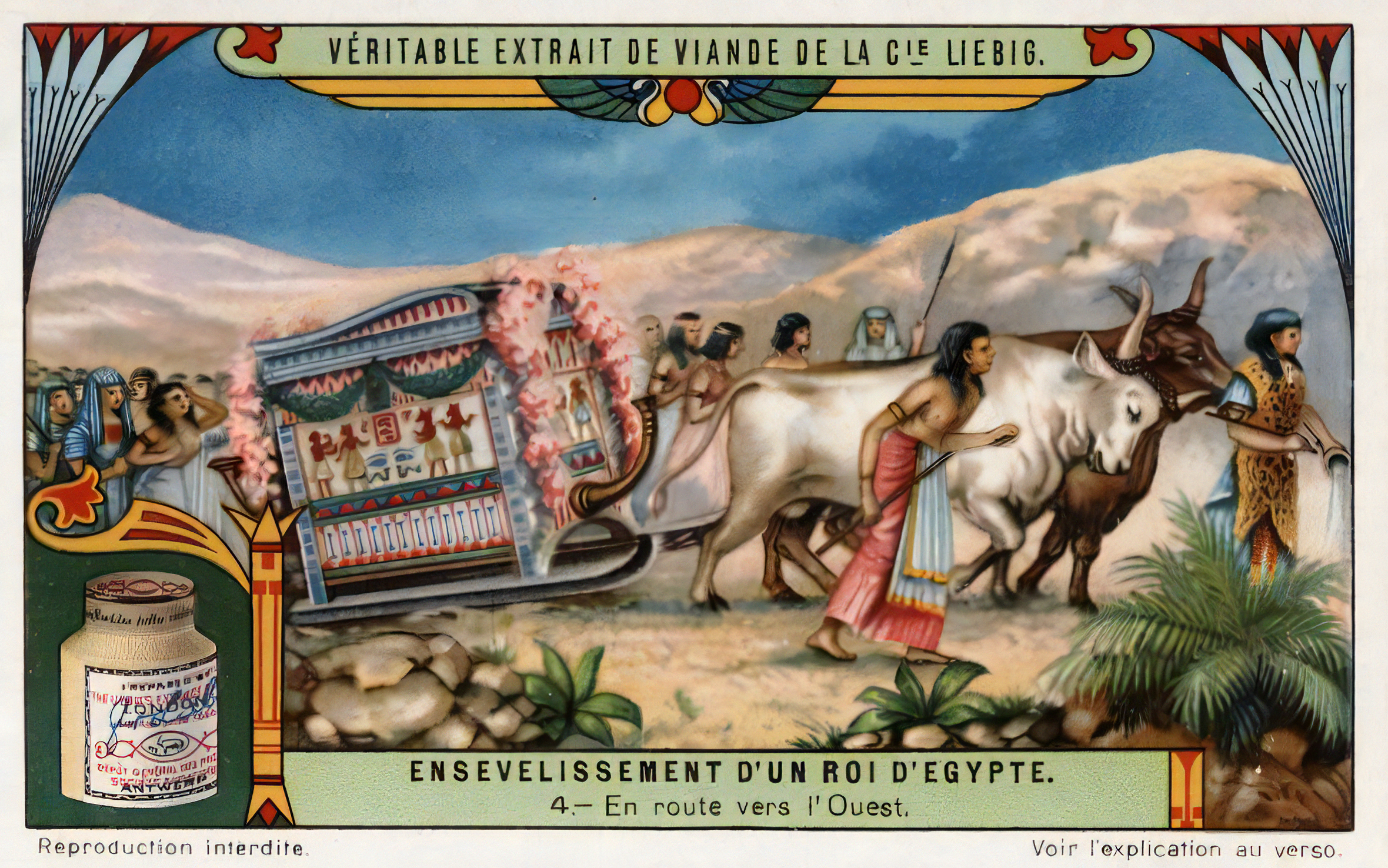
Advertisement for Liebig's Extract of Meat Company, c. 1900

Fray Bentos was trademarked in the UK by Liebig in 1881 for the purpose of marketing glue and "extract of meat", although, in practice, it was used principally for marketing corned beef. In fact, Fray Bentos became synonymous with corned beef.

Fray Bentos corned beef was targeted at a working-class market. The tins were also ideally suited as army rations as they weighed just one pound and were easily transportable. With the outbreak of the Boer War, the company's profits were significantly boosted from supplying corned beef to the British Army in South Africa. Fray Bentos corned beef was also supplied to the troops in World War I. Its popularity was such that the term "Fray Bentos" was used as slang by soldiers to mean "good". One of the early British tanks that fought at the Battle of Passchendaele was given the nickname "Fray Bentos", because the men inside felt like tinned meat.

=== Vestey: 1924–1968 ===
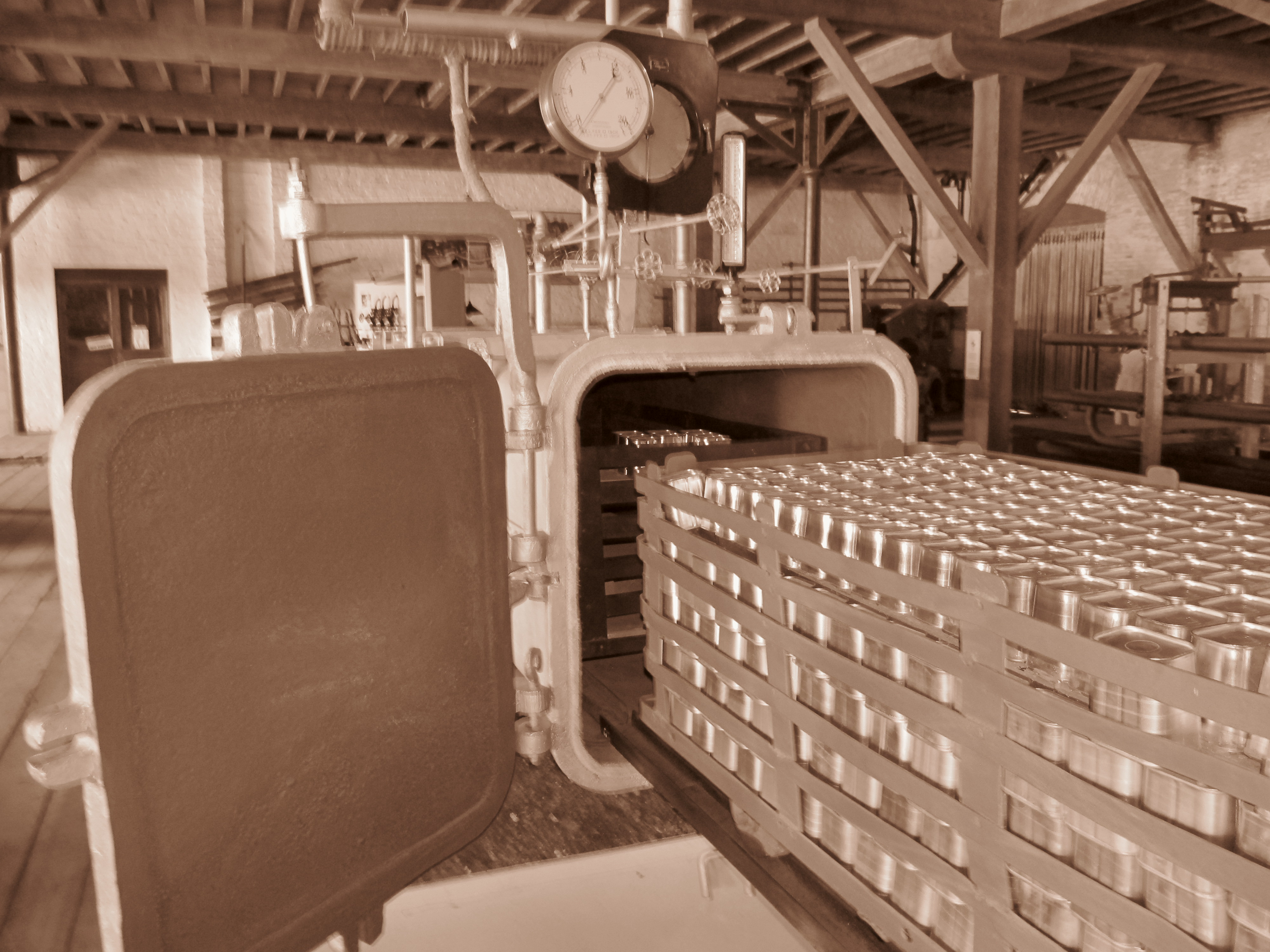
The tinned corned beef packaging plant at the Anglo factory in Fray Bentos

In 1924, Liebig Extract of Meat Company, together with the Fray Bentos brand, was acquired by the Vestey Group which renamed the Uruguayan operation Frigorífico Anglo del Uruguay, also known as the "Anglo Meatpacking Company".

Fray Bentos's peak was during World War II. As a supplier of meat to the Allies, Fray Bentos shipped more than 16 million cans of corned beef to Europe in 1943 alone. British soldiers serving in North Africa during the desert campaign called it Desert Chicken. The Anglo factory in Fray Bentos, at its height, employed over 5,000 workers from more than 50 countries to process 400 cows an hour. As a result of the demand for Fray Bentos products at this time the Uruguayan currency became more valuable than the US dollar.

In the immediate post-war years, Fray Bentos products were a staple food in Britain. The product range was expanded to include canned meat pies such as steak and kidney and minced beef and onion. In 1958, Vestey began manufacturing Fray Bentos pies in England, and production was moved to a plant in the London Borough of Hackney.

In 1964, the use of the brand for corned beef was significantly damaged when an outbreak of typhoid in Aberdeen, in which three people died, was traced to a tin of Fray Bentos corned beef imported from South America. The corned beef had been contaminated as a result of the cooling process during manufacture, in which the untreated water used had come, according to BBC News, "from a river into which an estimated 66 tonnes of human excrement and 250,000 gallons of urine entered every day".

At the end of the 1960s, Vestey disposed of the Anglo factory to the Uruguayan government (Note: The Uruguayan government closed the factory down in 1979. The Brazilian food manufacturer Marfrig re-opened the site in 2008 to produce corned beef, but without the rights to the Fray Bentos brand. In 2015, the factory was designated a UNESCO World Heritage Site.) and, in 1968, sold Liebig to Brooke Bond to form the merged manufacturing business of Brooke Bond Liebig.

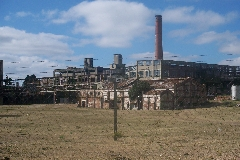
The Anglo plant in Fray Bentos

=== 1968–2013 ===
Brooke Bond Liebig was acquired by Unilever in 1984. In 1993, the Campbell Soup Company bought Fray Bentos from Unilever's Brooke Bond division. The Hackney plant was closed in the same year and production moved to Campbell's factory in King's Lynn.

Campbell's subsequently transferred its rights to the brand in the UK to Premier Foods as part of the sale of Campbell's UK operations in 2006. However, Campbell's continues to manufacture and sell steak and kidney pies in Australia under the Fray Bentos brand name. Premier Foods closed the King's Lynn factory in 2007 and moved its Fray Bentos production to its factory in Long Sutton, Lincolnshire.

In 2011, the Premier Foods canning division, including Fray Bentos, was bought by Princes Group, but, following an Office of Fair Trading investigation, Princes were required to immediately sell off Fray Bentos on competition grounds. It was bought by Baxters, the current owners, who announced that production would transfer to its site at Fochabers in Scotland. The move was completed in 2013.

=== Baxters since 2013 ===
Chicken meatballs in gravy

Baxters extended the Fray Bentos range to include "deep fill" pies (discontinued by 2022) and microwaveable bowl products. As a result of the COVID-19 lockdowns in the United Kingdom sales of canned goods experienced considerable growth, including Fray Bentos which increased sales by 29% in 2020.
