= Baxters =

Scottish food manufacturer

Baxters Food Group Ltd.

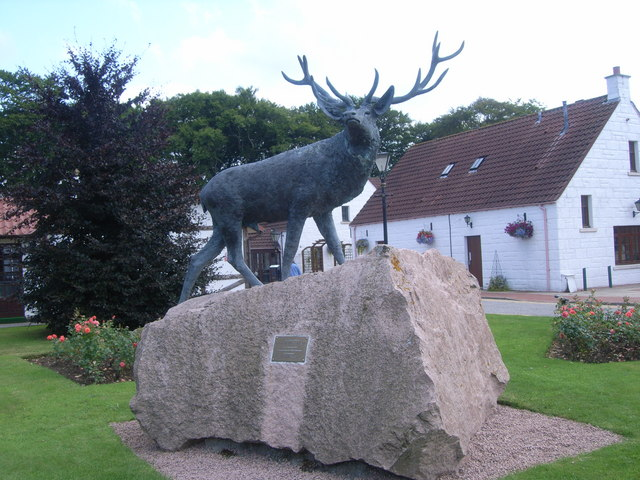
- Statue of a stag outside Baxters Highland Village
- Trade name: Baxters
- Type: Private
- Industry: Food Processing
- Founded: 1868
- Founder: George Baxter
- Headquarters: Edinburgh, Scotland
- Area served: Worldwide
- Key people: Audrey Baxter (Executive Chairman and CEO)
- Products: Canned meat, Condiments, Fruit preserves, Soup
- Brands: Audrey Baxter Signature Range, Fray Bentos, Garners, Jack Daniel's BBQ Sauce, Simply Delicious
- Revenue: ▲£248.6 million (2016)
- Net income: ▲£12.5 million (2016)
- Number of employees: 1,500 (2016)
- Website: www.baxters.com

Baxters Food Group Limited, (trading as Baxters), is a food processing company, based in Fochabers, Scotland. It produces foods such as canned soups, canned meat products, sour pickles, sauces, vinegars, antipasto, chutneys, fruit preserves and salad and meat condiments. The corporate headquarters are based in Edinburgh, Scotland.

Products are sold under the Baxters brand as well as a variety of brands owned, or licensed, to the group. Baxters has remained a private family company for four generations, during which time it has expanded significantly by acquiring other business within the United Kingdom and internationally.

The company was known as W.A. Baxter & Sons Ltd. prior to 21 December 2006.

== History ==
=== Origins and early to mid-20th century ===
Baxters was founded in 1868 by 25-year-old gardener George Baxter when he borrowed £100 from family members and established a grocery shop in Fochabers, Moray. George's wife Margaret Baxter supported her husband by making jams and jellies, using local fruit.

In 1916, George and Margaret's son, William Baxter, bought land from the Duke of Richmond and with his wife, Ethel Baxter, built a factory on a site next to the River Spey, to the east of Fochabers. The Baxters shop became known for supplying jams and jellies and began preparing its own beetroot and selling it wholesale to other grocers. Ethel concentrated on jam-making, while William promoted the business throughout Scotland. In 1923, Ethel Baxter hired a canning machine in order to can local fruit in syrup, such as strawberries, raspberries, and plums, with Baxters becoming one of the first companies in Scotland to do so. In 1929, she started creating a variety of soups, using local produce, the first being Royal Game using venison from Upper Speyside. The packaging artwork features a derivative of the painting The Monarch of the Glen, an oil-on-canvas painting of a red deer stag completed in 1851 by the English painter Sir Edwin Landseer. Before long, the Baxter family was supplying smart department stores in Westminster, such as Harrods and Fortnum & Mason.

During the Second World War, the company survived principally by producing jam for the armed forces.

=== Mid to late 20th century ===
Ena and Gordon Baxter joined the company in 1952. Ena, an artist and cook, helped expand the range of Scottish soups on offer to include traditional Scottish recipes such as Cock-a-leekie, Scotch Broth and Chicken Broth. In 1955, Baxters was granted royal warrants of appointment by Queen Elizabeth II, Queen Elizabeth The Queen Mother and King Gustav VI of Sweden for the manufacturer of Scottish food specialties.

In the 1960s, Baxters was supplying its products internationally and in 1962 it was the first company in the United Kingdom to introduce twist-top caps to 12-ounce (340-gram) jars for preserves. By the 1980s, Baxters had become a leading premium soup brand and began promoting more exotic soup flavours. Despite the increasing size of the company, Baxters maintained an image as a "family business", with a series of advertisements showing the Baxter family heavily involved in the preparation of their products.

Gordon Baxter's daughter Audrey Baxter became managing director in 1992, who along with her brother Andrew Baxter developed a range of new products. The company's other major shareholder is James Baxter, Andrew Baxter's son. Gordon Baxter died in 2013 (aged 95), and Ena Baxter in 2015 (aged 90).

=== 21st century ===
In the 21st century, Baxters commenced a strategy of significant expansion by acquiring rival food manufactures in order to double in size and increase annual turnover to in excess of £100 million. Its first acquisition was in July 2001 when Garner Foods Ltd., a producer of pickles, chutneys and salad dressings was purchased. Garners was established in 1989 and employed 40 people at its base in Pershore, Worcestershire.

In 2001, a new 70,000 sq ft (6,500 m^{2}) factory for the manufacturing of chilled soups was built for Baxters in Grimsby, northeast Lincolnshire.

CCL Foods PLC was purchased by Baxters in July 2003. The firm employed 50 people at its plant in Earls Colne near Colchester in Essex and produces pickles and condiments under the Mary Berry, Peppadew, Pizza Express, Olivaise and Simply Delicious brands and for supermarkets such as Safeway (now Morrisons) and Waitrose. CCL Foods operates as a subsidiary of Baxters and is now known as Baxters (Earls Colne) Ltd.

Norman Soutar was appointed as group managing director in July 2004 and was the first non-member of the Baxter family to lead the company. Soutar had joined Baxters in 2000 as food service director and was later director of corporate strategy. His appointment as group managing director gave him operational management of the business and began a new approach to foreign markets, whereby Baxters sought to establish overseas production facilities rather than relying on exporting goods from the United Kingdom.

Baxter's first overseas takeover was in 2004 when it purchased Canada's largest private label soup manufacturer, Soup-Experts Inc. The Quebec-based company was established in 1975, initially focusing on producing sauce before expanding into private label foods in the 1990s. Soup-Experts became part of the Baxters Canada group.

Baxters launched its flagship range of premium products in 2005 with the creation of the Audrey Baxter Signature Range. The range includes curds, conserves, marmalades, jellies, chutneys and relishes made in small batches. Limited editions are available seasonally.

In July 2006, Norman Soutar left Baxters, with executive chairman Audrey Baxter adopting the role of managing director. No reason for Soutar's departure was given, with many staff reportedly unaware until the matter was made public in September 2006, when newspaper reports suggested disagreement over how the firm was being run.

Against a background of poor performance in 2006, with annual profits falling by more than £1 million, Baxters opted to take advantage of lower labour costs by transferring its Garners Foods pickling operation to a 43,055 sq ft (3,999.9 m^{2}) purpose-built factory located in Wolsztyn, Poland. As a result, Garner's factory in Pershore was closed in 2007 with the loss of 23 jobs. Baxters continues to use the Garners brand.

Baxters Food Australia Pty Ltd. was established in 2006 to act as an in-country customer service division for Baxter's growing Australasia market. In April 2008, Baxters acquired Australian food processor Sole Pio Pty, a family company established in 1994 and based in Campbellfield, Melbourne, Victoria. Sole Pio specialised in supplying the catering sector with marinated and flame-grilled vegetables, pestos, and tapenades, under the Bamboleo and Argents Hill brands, both of which Baxters continues to use. Baxters bought Australian firm Andrews Food Distributors in 2010. In an effort to increase Baxter's market share in the Australian retail market, Jensen's Choice Foods was purchased in early 2013. Operating from Huntingdale in Melbourne, Jensen's was founded in 1984 and its product range includes pasta sauces, salsa dips, wet spices, passata, fruit spreads sold under the Jensen's Organic brand and cookie dough under the Aunty Kath's brand. It also manufactures private label brands for major retailers.

Baxters withdrew from the chilled soups sector in 2008 and sold its Grimsby factory to Northern Foods, attributing the move to strong competition in the sector and a desire to focus on more profitable products.

The soups division of Canadian firm CanGro Foods was bought by Baxters in May 2007, transferring into Baxters' Canadian operation, Baxters Canada Inc. The deal saw Baxters acquire the Primo and Aylmer soup brands and more than double its revenue in Canada.

Fray Bentos steak & kidney pie tin

In November 2011, to the surprise of some food manufacturing industry commentators, the company acquired the Fray Bentos range of pies and other canned meat products from Princes Ltd. Princes were forced to sell the brand on competition grounds having acquired it from Premier Foods as part of the purchase of Premier's canned food division. By January 2013, production-line equipment and the manufacturing of Fray Bentos products had been transferred from Long Sutton in Lincolnshire to the Baxters premises in Fochabers. Of the 125 new staff recruited as part of the expansion, 11 transferred from Long Sutton, which according to Baxters helped ensure a smooth transition between the two sites. The production line is accommodated in a two-storey extension to the Fochabers factory and initial production levels were 67,000 tinned pies per week.

Fray Bentos was named after the town of Fray Bentos in Uruguay, from which it originally imported meat into the UK. Fray Bentos was bought by Campbell's in 1993 and sold on to Premier Foods as part of the sale of the US food group's UK assets in 2006. Since the acquisition, Baxters has introduced new products under the Fray Bentos brand, such as soups in August 2012 and instant hot meals (Fray Bentos Hunger Busters) in June 2014.

In 2012, Baxters bought Manor Vinegar from their Japanese owners Mizkan Group. The company's manufacturing plant located in Burntwood, Staffordshire was purchased after the then Office of Fair Trading (OFT) raised competition concerns with Mizkan's purchase of the vinegar and pickles division of Premier Foods. The sale to Baxters alleviated the OFT's concerns and reinstated pre-existing levels of competition in the manufacture and supply of vinegars in the United Kingdom.

In 2014, Baxters bought Wornick Foods, a military rations manufacturer in the USA.

In January 2018, Baxters moved its headquarters to Edinburgh, though Audrey Baxter described Fochabers as remaining as the company's "spiritual home". Choosing to focus on US, European and Australian markets, Baxters sold its Canadian businesses, Baxters Canada Inc, in 2018.

== Today ==
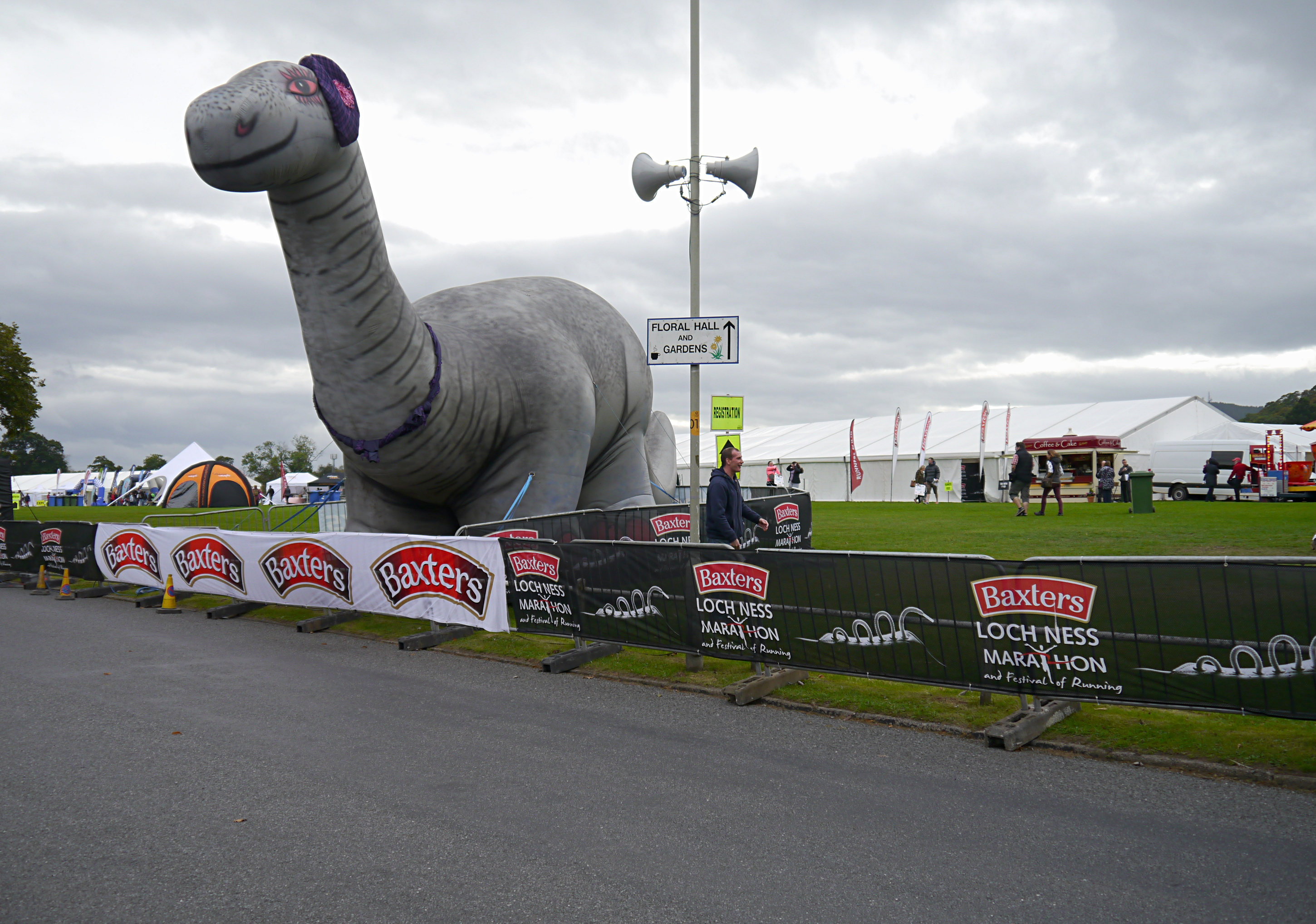
Baxters branding at the Loch Ness Marathon.

Baxters has been the main sponsor of the annual Loch Ness Marathon and Festival of Running since 2002. The event takes place in and around Inverness in the Scottish Highlands, around 40 miles to the west of Baxter's Fochabers headquarters.

In late 2020, Baxters expanded its US operations by acquiring Truitt Bros, a contract manufacturer of shelf-stable, thermally processed foods, with 500 employees in Kentucky and Oregon.

Baxters was declared number six in the Scottish Grocer magazine's Scottish Brand Review for 2020.

== Brands and products ==
Alongside Baxter's own brand products, other products are sold under a variety of brands owned by, or licensed to, the group.

=== Baxters Food Group ===
Audrey Baxter Signature Range

- Chutneys
- Conserves and Honeys
- Curds
- Jellies
- Marmalades
- Relishes

Baxters

- Soup Ranges
  - Baxters Chef's Selections
  - Baxters Favourites
  - Baxters Hearty
  - Baxters Vegetarian
- Condiments
  - Baxters Beetroots
  - Baxters Chutneys
  - Baxters Deli Toppers
  - Baxters Jams and Marmalades
  - Baxters Onions
  - Baxters Traditional Condiments
- Juice
  - Baxters Beetroot Juice
- Ready Meals
  - Baxters Meal Pots

Fray Bentos

- Canned Foods
  - Fray Bentos Pies
  - Fray Bentos Deep Fill Pies
  - Fray Bentos Meatballs
  - Fray Bentos Meaty Puds
  - Fray Bentos Puddings
- Ready Meals
  - Fray Bentos Hunger Busters

Garners

- Garners Pickles
- Garners Chutneys

Jack Daniels

- Jack Daniels BBQ Sauces

Manor Vinegar

- Vinegar

Mary Berry

- Chutneys
- Salad Dressings
- Sauces and Condiments

Peppadew

- Piquanté Peppers
- Roasted Red Peppers

Pizza Express

- Condiments

Simply Delicious

- Simply Delicious Sauces
- Simply Delicious Peppers

== Premises ==
=== Current ===
==== Manufacturing Sites ====
- Fochabers, Moray, Scotland - The company's main manufacturing site is where it produces canned soups, jars of beetroot, jams and preserves. Around 80 staff are employed at this location.
- Earls Colne, Colchester, Essex, England - Manufactures organic and non-organic condiments, mayonnaises, sauces, dressings, mustards and dips under the Simply Delicious brand.
- Wolsztyn, Poland - A 4,000 square metre purpose-built factory constructed in 2007 to allow the onion pickling operation to transfer from Pershore, Worcestershire. Manufactures Garners range of pickled products.

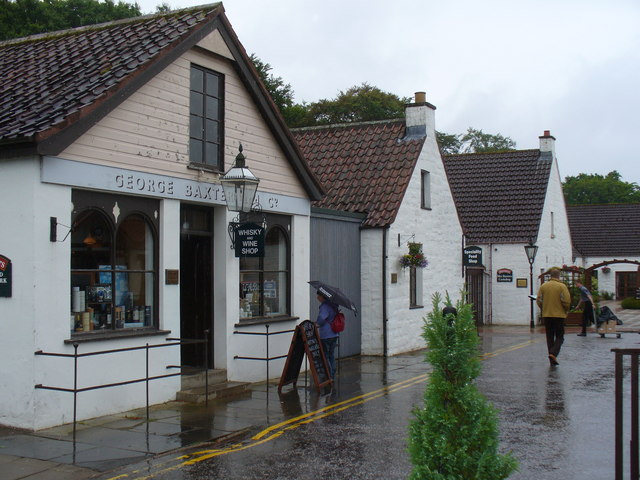
Baxters Highland Village Visitor Centre (closed in February, 2021)

Baxters also have sales & marketing offices in Glasgow, Scotland and Melbourne, Australia.

=== Former ===
- Pershore, Worcestershire, England - Acquired as part of the purchase of Garners Foods in 2001. The factory was closed with the loss of 23 jobs in 2006 when production was moved to Wolsztyn, Poland.
- Aberdeen International Airport - Shop opened in 2002 within landside part of the passenger terminal. Sold Baxters produce as well as Scottish themed gifts.
- Eaglesgate Retail Village, Blackford, Perth and Kinross, Scotland - Shop and 250-seat restaurant opened in 2005 and functioned as Baxter's retail headquarters and distribution warehouse. Closed in February 2014 after the landlord sold the retail village forcing the closure of the Baxters premises. A suitable alternative location to operate the distribution hub from could not be found.
- Dunsdale Haugh, Selkirk, Scottish Borders, Scotland - £1million was spent transforming the vacant Selkirk Glass factory into an 8,300 square foot shop and restaurant in May 2008. Closed in February 2014 with the loss of 23 full-time and part-time jobs as a consequence of the Blackford site closing.
- Ocean Terminal, Leith, Edinburgh, Scotland - Lifestyle shop and 50-seat restaurant opened in October 2003. Closed in early 2014 as a consequence of the Blackford site closing.
- Saint-Hyacinthe, Quebec, Canada - The original Canadian company was called Les Produits Freddy. In 2002 it became SoupExperts. It specialised in private label manufacturing and then expanded to make a range of Baxter's branded soups for the Canadian market.
- Highland Village Visitor Centre, Fochabers, Moray, Scotland - Located adjacent to the Fochabers headquarters and manufacturing site the Highland Village in centred around George Baxter's original shop and includes an exhibition, restaurants, Mrs Baxter's Cook Shop selling cooking and kitchen items, Coat and Swagger shop selling clothing and the Baxters Gift Shop. It received over 200,000 visitors per annum. After being temporarily shut down on 24 December 2020, due to the coronavirus pandemic, the complex was confirmed to be permanently closed in February, 2021.
- Home Farm, Kelty, Fife, Scotland - Shop and coffee shop opened in 2008.

== Controversy ==
=== Health and safety ===
A member of staff at Baxter's Fochabers manufacturing plant had to have his left foot amputated on-site after getting trapped in a vegetable auger during January 2014. The victim was trapped in the machine for an hour as emergency services, including two orthopaedic surgeons from Dr Gray's Hospital in Elgin attempted to free him. He was later flown by air ambulance to Raigmore Hospital in Inverness. Following a Health and Safety Executive (HSE) investigation, Elgin Sheriff Court heard in October 2015 that an improvised method of pushing remaining vegetables into an auger was regularly used. Baxters management were not aware that staff regularly used a ladder to climb on to the conveyor then used a squeegee to push vegetables towards the auger. The victim was injured when his left foot slipped from the belt into the collection hopper and was pulled into the auger. Baxters was fined £60,000 for being in breach of the Health and Safety at Work etc. Act 1974 after it was found that risk assessments in place at the time of the incident were not suitable or sufficient.

Following an inspection in May 2015, Baxters was instructed by HSE to improve safety at its Fochabers manufacturing plant. HSE found that exposure to flour dust, which can lead to asthma, was not controlled satisfactorily. Measures to reduce the risk of injury to staff during the loading of meat mincers were also found to be inadequate. Baxters responded that it was working hard to rectify the matters raised.

Baxters was fined £6,000 at Elgin Sheriff Court in May 2015 after admitting breaches to health and safety legislation which led to a member of staff suffering a hand injury during an accident involving a conveyor belt. The incident at the Fochabers plant was investigated by HSE after it was reported by Baxters.

In September 2016, Baxters was fined £70,000 when the company pleaded guilty to breaching health and safety regulations in relation to an accident in March 2015 when an employee's hand was mutilated in a packaging machine at the company's Fochabers plant. An alarm indicating that the machine was about to start was faulty and Baxters had failed to act on an improvement notice issued by HSE twelve months earlier, which if acted upon could have prevented the incident.

=== Industrial relations ===
It was reported in October 2014 by local newspapers that staff working in the soup factory at Baxter's Fochabers plant staged a three-hour strike in a dispute with management about new working and pay conditions.
