= Fray Bentos F.C. =

Uruguayan football club

Fray Bentos
- Full name: Fray Bentos Fútbol Club
- Nickname(s): Gorrión, Decano
- Founded: September 12, 1905
- Ground: Parque Alberto Pedro Indart; Fray Bentos, Uruguay
- Capacity: 800
- Chairman: ?
- Manager: ?
- League: Liga Departamental de Fútbol de Río Negro

Fray Bentos Fútbol Club is a football club from Fray Bentos in Uruguay.

Established on September 12, 1905, it is the oldest football club in its city, therefore it is known as "the Doyen" (Spanish: el Decano).

On June 13, 1912, together with the Liebig Football Club was established the Liga Departamental de Fútbol de Río Negro.
