= Fray Bentos =

- Capital city
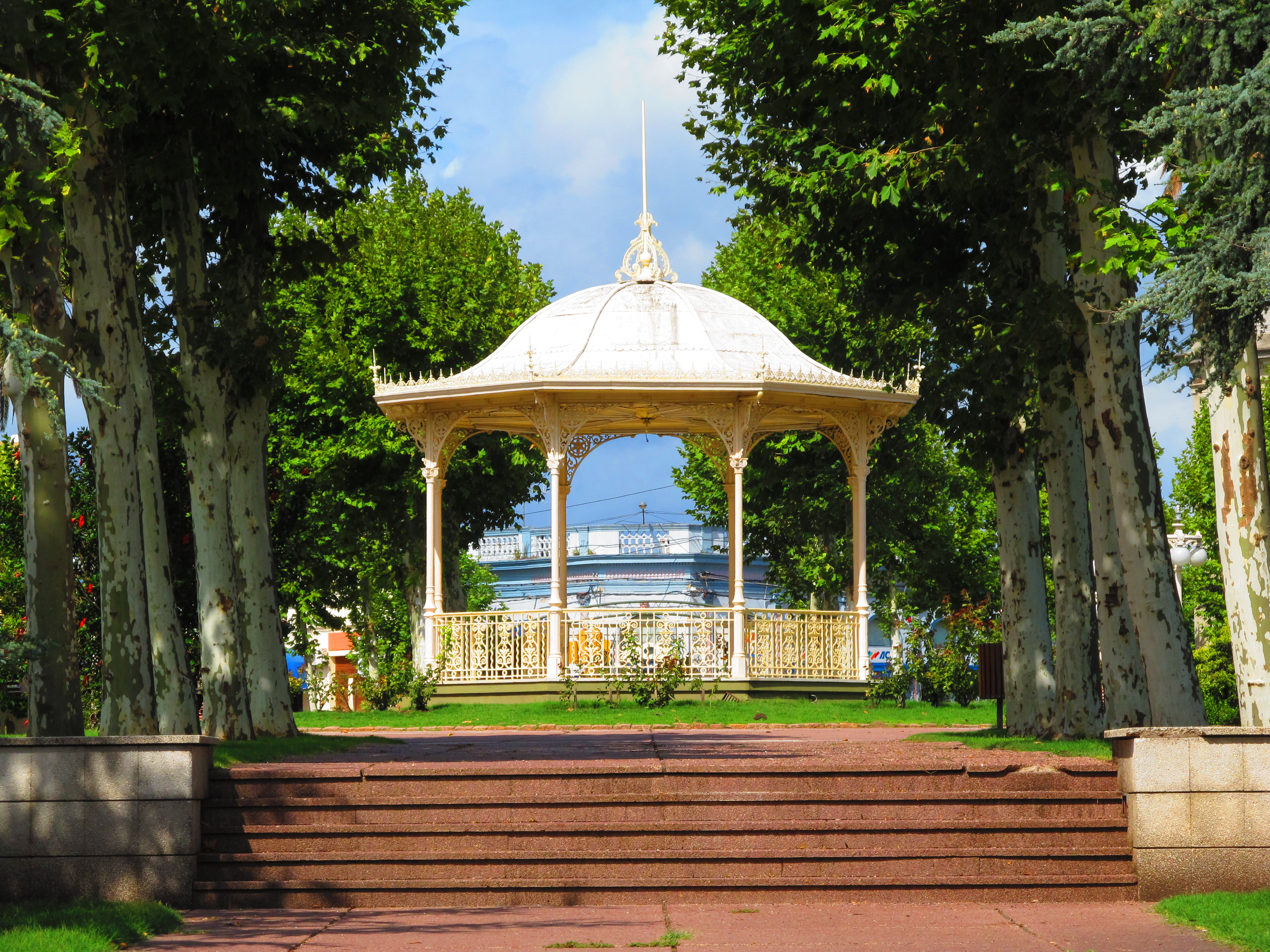
- Glorieta kiosco - Pergola Plaza Pueblo

- Location within Uruguay
- Coordinates: 33°08′0″S 58°18′0″W
- Country: Uruguay
- Department: Río Negro Department
- Founded: 1859

Area
  - Total: 10.8 km^{2} (4.2 sq mi)
- Elevation: 23 m (75 ft)

Population (2023 Census)
  - Total: 26,297
  - Density: 2,430/km^{2} (6,310/sq mi)
  - Demonym: fraybentino
- Time zone: UTC–3
- Postal code: 65000
- Dial plan: +598 456 (+5 digits)
- Climate: Cfa
- Website: enfraybentos.com

UNESCO World Heritage Site
- Official name: Fray Bentos Industrial Landscape
- Criteria: Cultural: (ii), (iv)
- Reference: 1464
- Inscription: 2015 (39th Session)
- Area: 273.8 ha (677 acres)
- Buffer zone: 2,127.7 ha (5,258 acres)
- Website: https://www.rionegro.gub.uy

Fray Bentos (Spanish pronunciation: [fɾaj ˈβentos]) is the capital city of the Río Negro Department, in south-western Uruguay, at the Argentina-Uruguay border, near the Argentine city of Gualeguaychú. Its port on the Uruguay River is one of the nation's most important harbours. The city hosts the first campus of the Technological University, beside the historically relevant industrial complex Anglo, a World Heritage Site, however, the Port is mainly famous for giving the name to the world renowned Fray Bentos pies.

One of the biggest pulp mills in the world is situated close to Fray Bentos and the Libertador General San Martín Bridge; it was the center of the largest political dispute between Uruguay and Argentina during the 21st century.

== Geography ==
The city is close to the border with Argentina and about 160 kilometres (99 mi) due north of Buenos Aires, and 309 kilometres (192 mi) north-west from Montevideo, Uruguay's capital.

== History ==
The town was founded as 'Villa Independencia' by Decree of 16 April 1859. It became capital of the Department of Río Negro on 7 July 1860 by the Act of Ley Nº 1.475 and its status was elevated to "Ciudad" (city) on 16 July 1900 by the Act of Ley Nº 2.656. Its current name, meaning "Friar Benedict", is derived from a reclusive priest.

Historically, Fray Bentos' main industry has been meat processing. An industrial plant owned by the Societe de Fray Bentos Giebert & Cie., the Liebig Extract of Meat Company (LEMCO), was founded there in 1863. It was closed in 1979, after 117 years in operation. A local history museum opened on the site in March 2005.

The surroundings of Fray Bentos were the location of the crash of Austral Flight 2553, in which 74 people were killed (69 passengers and 5 crew) on 10 October 1997.

On 5 July 2015, the city's Barrio Anglo, the location of the industrial plant, was declared a World Heritage Site as the "Fray Bentos Cultural-Industrial Landscape".

== Population ==
In 2023 Fray Bentos had a population of 26,967.

Year	Population
1908	7,359
1963	17,094
1975	19,407
1985	19,862
1996	21,959
2004	23,122
2011	24,406
2023	26,967

Source: Instituto Nacional de Estadística de Uruguay

== Economy ==
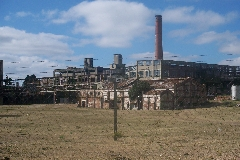
A meatpacking plant in Fray Bentos

In 1899 a company called "Frigorífico Anglo del Uruguay" (often referred to as "Anglo") which originated from Lemco, began making corned beef there, which was sold as "Fray Bentos Corned Beef" in the UK. Fifty years later, the company diversified into soups, meatballs and tinned fruit. During the 1990s the focus shifted to pies and puddings, and the company was taken over by the Campbell's. In 2006, 'Campbells UK' was acquired by Premier Foods. The "Fray Bentos" brand is now owned in the UK by Baxters, which manufactures the product range in Scotland. The Campbell Soup Company manufactures and sells Fray Bentos-branded steak and kidney pies in Australia.

In 2008, the Brazilian-owned Marfrig Group announced the reopening of one of the factories related to the Liebig factory and the resumption of export of meat products, though at a lower volume than at the original factory.

=== Pulp mill dispute ===
Botnia S.A., a subsidiary of Finnish corporation Metsä-Botnia, built a large cellulose factory (pulp mill) in Fray Bentos to produce bleached eucalyptus pulp. Production started in November 2007, and the first shipments were made in December 2007 from the port of Nueva Palmira. Investment in the project was about 1 billion USD. Several groups raised concerns regarding the effects of this and other pulp mills on the Uruguay River, which runs between Uruguay and Argentina, as well as whether Argentina had been provided with adequate notice regarding construction. On 30 April 2005 about 40,000 Argentine protesters from Entre Ríos, along with environmental groups from both countries, demonstrated at the bridge linking both countries. Afterwards ten to fifteen Argentines set up a roadblock at the international bridge to put pressure on the Uruguayan government to stop production at the factory, claiming it would gravely pollute the Uruguay River. On 20 December 2005 a World Bank study concluded that the factory would not have a negative impact on the environment or tourism in either country. The paper mill started operating in November 2007.

== Transportation ==
Villa Independencia Airport serves Fray Bentos, but has no commercial air service.

== Museums and culture ==
Fray Bentos has an Industrial Revolution Museum in the former meat processing factory of the Liebig Extract of Meat Company, where thousands of people worked. When it was shut down, the opportunity was taken to create a museum, with the original machinery, and social and cultural artefacts of the technological revolution in Fray Bentos. The museum exhibits the machinery used in the meat and extract of meat process, the buildings, an 1893 Merryweather water-pumping machine, a complete canning plant, a plant where the meat was cooked, a laboratory, etc.

It also has a museum for the artist Luis Alberto Solari, who was born in the city.

The Miguel Young Theatre is a cultural landmark.

== Sports ==
Fray Bentos has its own football league, the Liga Departamental de Fútbol de Río Negro, established in 1912, made up of 14 teams. Among the most notable are Fray Bentos Fútbol Club, Club Atlético Anglo and Laureles Fútbol Club.

== Notable people ==
- José Pedro Barrán (1934–2009), historian
- Carlos Demasi (born 22 August 1949), historian
- Federico Elduayen (born 25 June 1977), footballer
- Carlos Fischer (1903–1969), politician, member of the National Council of Government 1955–1959
- Walter Pelletti (born 31 May 1966), former footballer
- Gastón Ramírez (2 December 1990), footballer
- Luis Alberto Solari (17 October 1918 – 13 October 1993), painter and engraver
- Juan Manuel Tenuta (1924–2013), was an actor
- Juan José Timón (18 November 1937 – 13 July 2001), cyclist
- Lucas Torreira, (born 11 February 1996), footballer

== Sister cities ==
Fray Bentos is twinned with:

- General Artigas, Paraguay

== See also ==
- Aberdeen typhoid outbreak 1964
- List of diplomatic missions in Uruguay#Consulate in Fray Bentos
