= 2016 United States House of Representatives elections in Nebraska =

- November 8, 2016

All 3 Nebraska seats to the United States House of Representatives
	Majority party	Minority party
Party	Republican	Democratic
Last election	2	1
Seats won	3	0
Seat change	▲1	▼1
Popular vote	557,557	221,069
Percentage	70.74%	28.04%
Swing	▲7.10%	▼6.55%

Republican
40–50%
50–60%
60–70%
70–80%
80–90%
>90%
Democratic
50–60%

The 2016 United States House of Representatives elections in Nebraska were held on November 8, 2016, to elect the three U.S. representatives from the state of Nebraska, one from each of the state's three congressional districts. The elections coincided with the 2016 U.S. presidential election, as well as other elections to the House of Representatives, elections to the United States Senate and various state and local elections. The primaries were held on May 10.

== Overview ==
=== Statewide ===
Popular vote
Republican	70.74%
Democratic	28.04%
Libertarian	1.22%

House seats
Republican	100.0%
Democratic	0%
Libertarian	0%

=== By district ===
Results of the 2016 United States House of Representatives elections in Nebraska by district:

District	Republican		Democratic		Others		Total		Result
District	Votes	%	Votes	%	Votes	%	Votes	%	Result
District 1	189,771	69.45%	83,467	30.55%	0	0.00%	273,238	100.0%	Republican hold
District 2	141,066	48.93%	137,602	47.73%	9,640	3.34%	288,308	100.0%	Republican gain
District 3	226,720	100.0%	0	0.00%	0	0.00%	226,720	100.0%	Republican hold
Total	557,557	70.74%	221,069	28.04%	9,640	1.22%	788,266	100.0%	

== District 1 ==
2016 Nebraska's 1st congressional district election
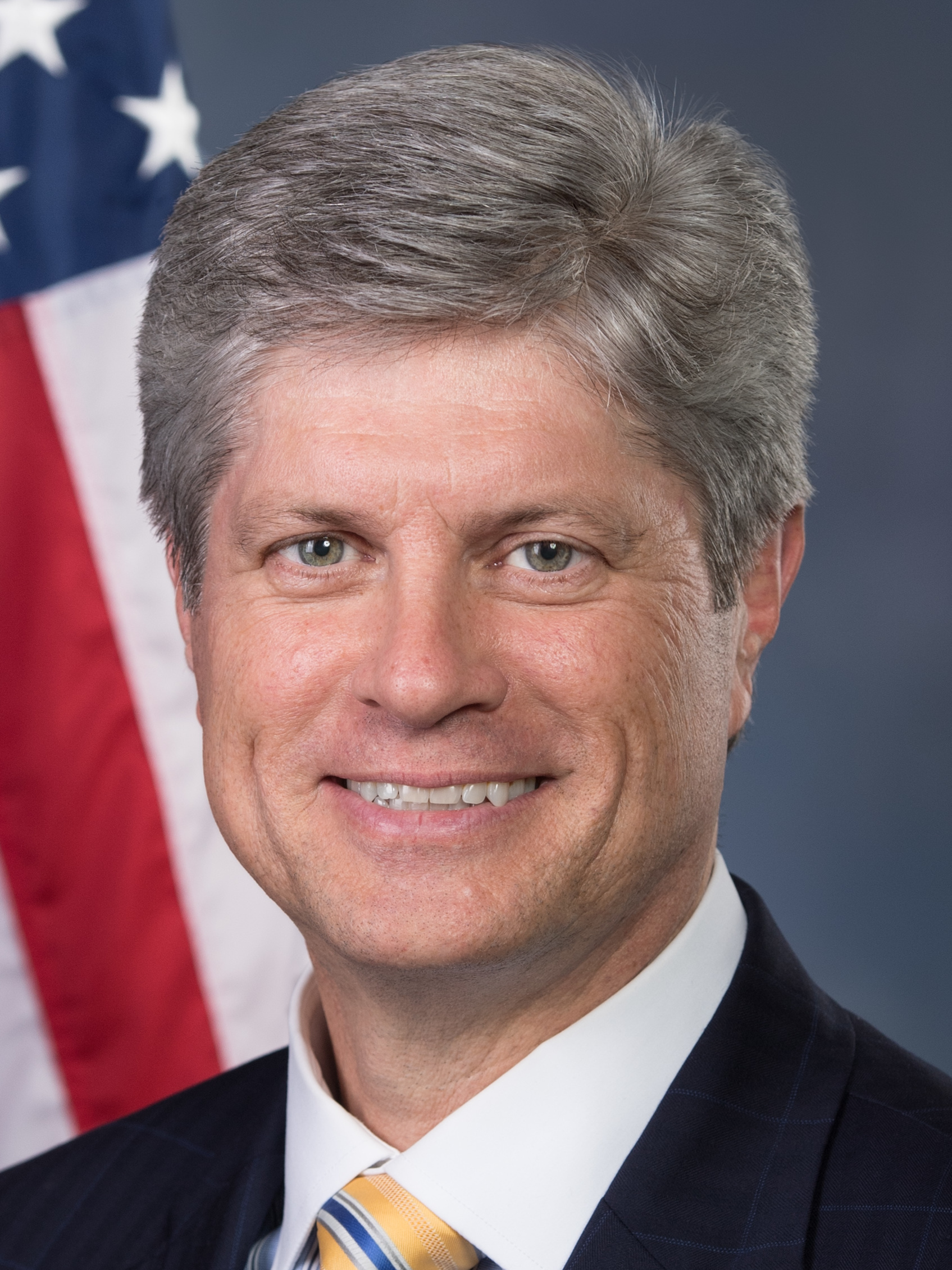

Nominee	Jeff Fortenberry	Daniel Wik
Party	Republican	Democratic
Popular vote	189,771	83,467
Percentage	69.5%	30.5%
- County results Fortenberry: 60–70% 70–80% 80–90%
U.S. Representative before election
Jeff Fortenberry
Republican
Elected U.S. Representative
Jeff Fortenberry
Republican

The 1st district encompassed most of the eastern quarter of the state and almost completely enveloped the 2nd district. It included the state capital, Lincoln, as well as the cities of Fremont, Columbus, Norfolk, Beatrice and South Sioux City. Incumbent Republican Jeff Fortenberry, who had represented the district since 2005, ran for re-election. He was re-elected with 69% of the vote in 2014. The district had a PVI of R+10.

=== Republican primary ===
==== Candidates ====
===== Nominee =====
- Jeff Fortenberry, incumbent U.S. Representative

==== Results ====
Republican primary results
Party	Candidate	Votes	%
Republican	Jeff Fortenberry (incumbent)	62,704	100.0
Total votes		62,704	100.0

=== Democratic primary ===
==== Candidates ====
===== Nominee =====
- Daniel Wik, physician

==== Results ====
Democratic primary results
Party	Candidate	Votes	%
Democratic	Daniel Wik	25,762	100.0
Total votes		25,762	100.0

=== General election ===
==== Predictions ====
Source	Ranking	As of
The Cook Political Report	Safe R	November 7, 2016
Daily Kos Elections	Safe R	November 7, 2016
Rothenberg	Safe R	November 3, 2016
Sabato's Crystal Ball	Safe R	November 7, 2016
RCP	Safe R	October 31, 2016

==== Results ====
Nebraska's 1st congressional district, 2016
Party	Candidate	Votes	%
Republican	Jeff Fortenberry (incumbent)	189,771	69.5
Democratic	Daniel Wik	83,467	30.5
Total votes		273,238	100.0
Republican hold			

== District 2 ==
2016 Nebraska's 2nd congressional district election
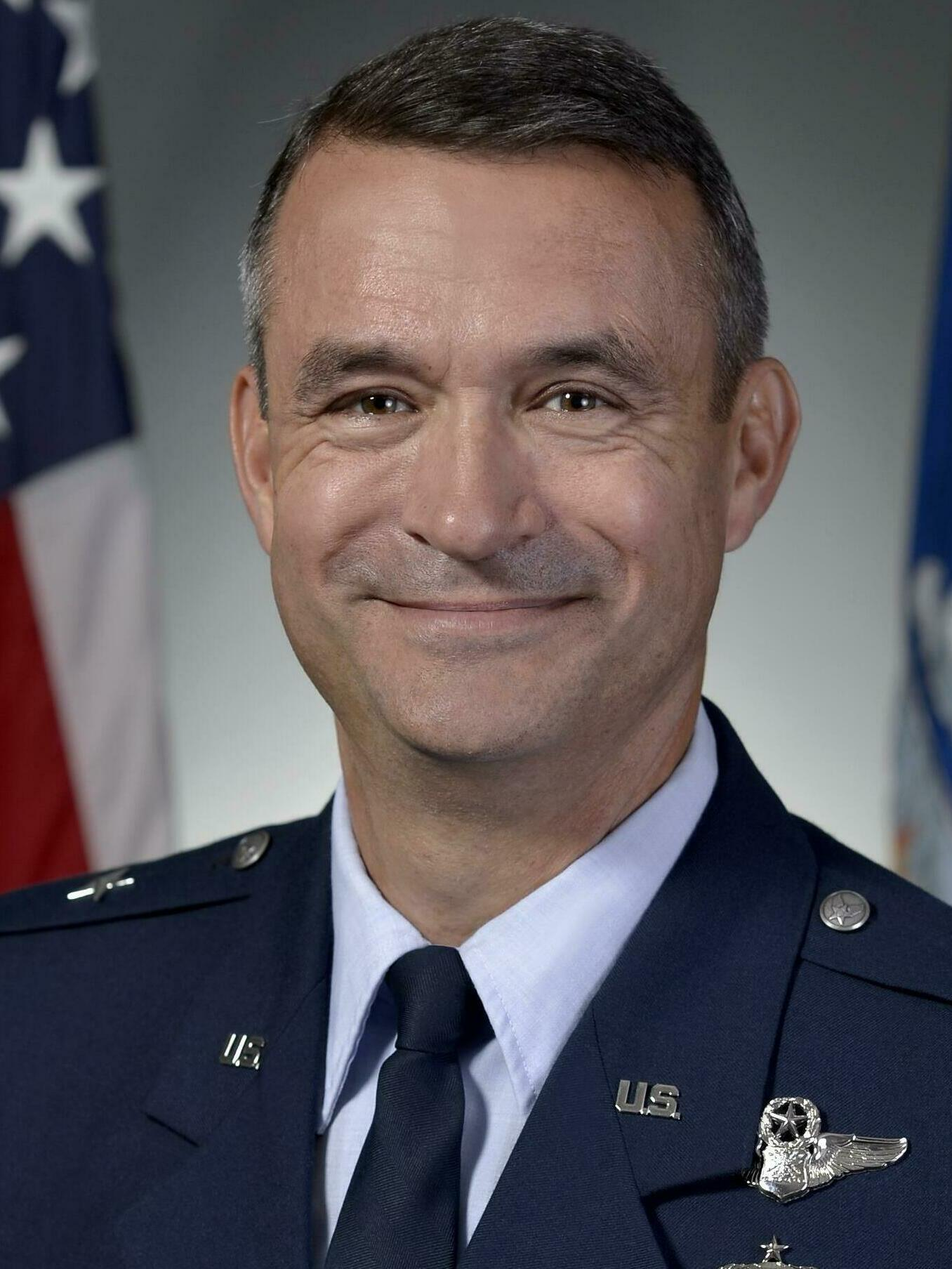

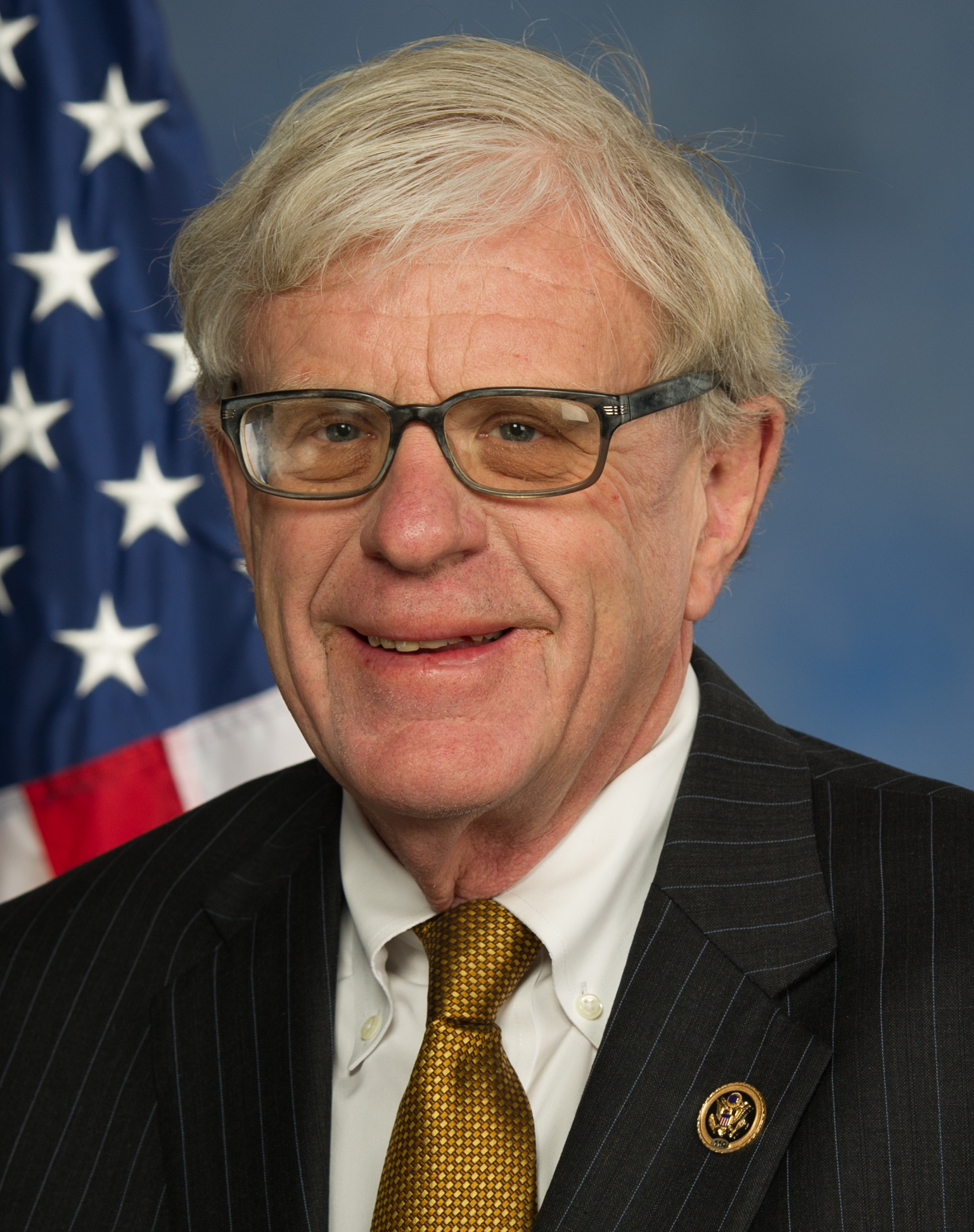
Nominee	Don Bacon	Brad Ashford
Party	Republican	Democratic
Popular vote	141,066	137,602
Percentage	48.9%	47.7%
- County results Bacon: 60–70% Ashford: 50–60%
U.S. Representative before election
Brad Ashford
Democratic
Elected U.S. Representative
Don Bacon
Republican

The 2nd district was based in the Omaha–Council Bluffs metropolitan area and included all of Douglas County and the urbanized areas of Sarpy County. Incumbent Democrat Brad Ashford, who had represented the district since 2015, ran for re-election. He was elected with 49% of the vote in 2014, defeating Republican incumbent Lee Terry. The district had a Cook Partisan Voting Index (PVI) of R+4.

=== Democratic primary ===
Scott Kleeb, a businessman who was the nominee for Nebraska's 3rd congressional district in 2006 and for the U.S. Senate in 2008, was speculated to challenge Ashford, a centrist Democrat, from the left. Kleeb ultimately did not run and Ashford won the primary unopposed.

==== Candidates ====
===== Nominee =====
- Brad Ashford, incumbent U.S. Representative

===== Declined =====
- Scott Kleeb, businessman, nominee for the 3rd district in 2006 and for U.S. Senate in 2008

==== Results ====
Democratic primary results
Party	Candidate	Votes	%
Democratic	Brad Ashford (incumbent)	23,470	100.0
Total votes		23,470	100.0

=== Republican primary ===
Former state senator and Douglas County Commissioner Chip Maxwell, who considered running as an independent against Terry in 2012, and retired United States Air Force brigadier general Don Bacon ran in the Republican primary.

==== Candidates ====
===== Nominee =====
- Don Bacon, retired United States Air Force Brigadier General

===== Eliminated in primary =====
- Chip Maxwell, former state senator

===== Withdrawn =====
- Dirk Arneson, salesmen (withdrew September 3, 2015, and endorsed Bacon)

==== Endorsements ====
Don Bacon

U.S. Senators

- Deb Fischer, U.S. Senator (R-NE)

U.S. Representatives

- Newt Gingrich, former Speaker of the House
- Steve Russell, U.S. Representative (R-OK)
- Lee Zeldin, U.S. Representative (R-NY)
- Ryan Zinke, U.S. Representative (R-MT)

State officials

- Kay A. Orr, former Governor of Nebraska
- Rick Perry, former Governor of Texas
- Pete Ricketts, Governor of Nebraska

State legislators

- Dave Bloomfield, state senator
- Beau McCoy, state senator

Individuals

- William G. Boykin, retired Army lieutenant general and Executive Vice President of the Family Research Council

==== Results ====
Republican primary results
Party	Candidate	Votes	%
Republican	Don Bacon	32,328	66.0
Republican	Chip Maxwell	16,677	34.0
Total votes		49,005	100.0

=== Libertarian primary ===
==== Candidates ====
===== Nominee =====
- Steven Laird

===== Eliminated in primary =====
- Andy Shambaugh
- Jeffrey Lynn Stein

==== Results ====
Libertarian primary results
Party	Candidate	Votes	%
Libertarian	Steven Laird	108	46.2
Libertarian	Andy Shambaugh	89	38.0
Libertarian	Jeffrey Lynn Stein	37	15.8
Total votes		234	100.0

=== General election ===
==== Campaign ====
The general election race was characterized as a tossup with the incumbent Ashford having a slight edge.

==== Endorsements ====
Brad Ashford (D)

Organizations

- Democratic Congressional Campaign Committee "Frontline" Program
- U.S. Chamber of Commerce
Don Bacon (R)

U.S. Senators

- Deb Fischer, U.S. Senator (R-NE)

U.S. Representatives

- Newt Gingrich, former Speaker of the House
- Steve Russell, U.S. Representative (R-OK)
- Lee Zeldin, U.S. Representative (R-NY)
- Ryan Zinke, U.S. Representative (R-MT)

State officials

- Kay A. Orr, former Governor of Nebraska
- Rick Perry, former Governor of Texas
- Pete Ricketts, Governor of Nebraska

State legislators

- Dave Bloomfield, state senator
- Beau McCoy, state senator

Organizations

- National Republican Congressional Committee "Young Guns" Program

Individuals

- William G. Boykin, retired Army lieutenant general and Executive Vice President of the Family Research Council

==== Polling ====
Poll source	Date(s) administered	Sample size	Margin of error	Brad Ashford (D)	Don Bacon (R)	Steven Laird (L)	Undecided
Singularis Group (R-Bacon)	October 26–27, 2016	1,482	± 2.54%	45%	47%	4%	3%
North Star Opinion Research (R-CLF)	October 22–24, 2016	400	± 4.9%	44%	48%	—	8%
Global Strategy Group (D–Ashford)	September 14–18, 2016	402	± 4.9%	50%	40%	—	10%
Singularis Group (R-Bacon)	May 11–12, 2016	1,007	± 3.08%	42%	44%	5%	8%

==== Predictions ====
Source	Ranking	As of
The Cook Political Report	Tossup	November 7, 2016
Daily Kos Elections	Tossup	November 7, 2016
Rothenberg	Tilt D	November 3, 2016
Sabato's Crystal Ball	Lean D	November 7, 2016
RCP	Tossup	October 31, 2016

==== Results ====
Nebraska's 2nd congressional district, 2016
Party	Candidate	Votes	%
Republican	Don Bacon	141,066	48.9
Democratic	Brad Ashford (incumbent)	137,602	47.7
Libertarian	Steven Laird	9,640	3.4
Total votes		288,308	100.0
Republican gain from Democratic			

== District 3 ==
2016 Nebraska's 3rd congressional district election
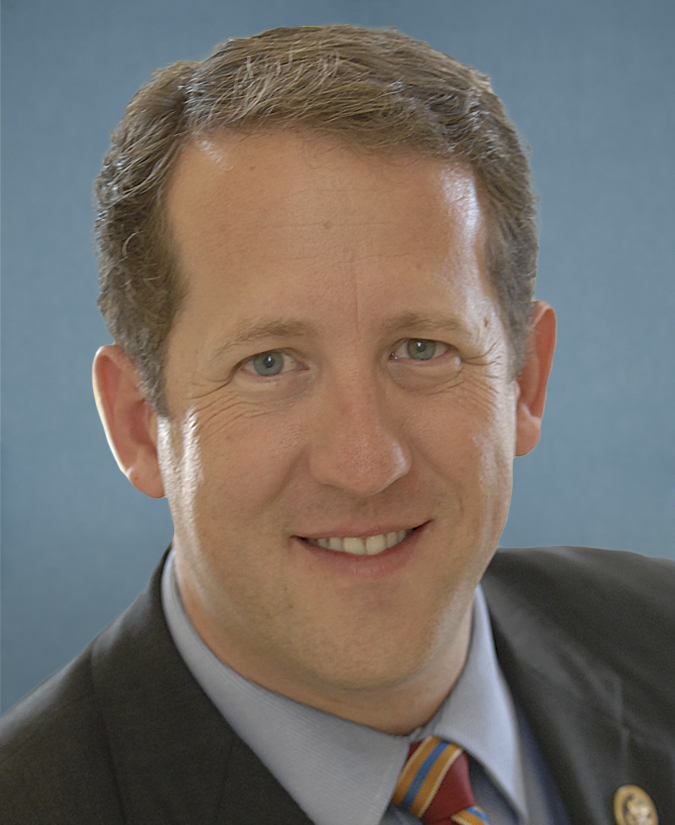
Nominee	Adrian Smith
Party	Republican
Popular vote	226,720
Percentage	100.0%
U.S. Representative before election
Adrian Smith
Republican
Elected U.S. Representative
Adrian Smith
Republican

The 3rd district encompassed the western three-fourths of the state; it was one of the largest non-at-large Congressional districts in the country, covering nearly 65,000 square miles (170,000 km^{2}), two time zones and 68.5 counties. It was mostly sparsely populated but included the cities of Grand Island, Kearney, Hastings, North Platte and Scottsbluff. Incumbent Republican Adrian Smith, who had represented the district since 2007, ran for re-election. He was re-elected with 75% of the vote in 2014. The district had a PVI of R+23.

=== Republican primary ===
==== Candidates ====
===== Nominee =====
- Adrian Smith, incumbent U.S. Representative

==== Results ====
Republican primary results
Party	Candidate	Votes	%
Republican	Adrian Smith (incumbent)	78,154	100.0
Total votes		78,154	100.0

=== Democratic primary ===
No Democrats filed.

=== General election ===
==== Predictions ====
Source	Ranking	As of
The Cook Political Report	Safe R	November 7, 2016
Daily Kos Elections	Safe R	November 7, 2016
Rothenberg	Safe R	November 3, 2016
Sabato's Crystal Ball	Safe R	November 7, 2016
RCP	Safe R	October 31, 2016

==== Results ====
Nebraska's 3rd congressional district, 2016
Party	Candidate	Votes	%
Republican	Adrian Smith (incumbent)	226,720	100.0
Total votes		226,720	100.0
Republican hold			

== See also ==
- Nebraska's congressional districts
- List of United States congressional districts
- 2016 Nebraska elections
