= Senator Cavanagh =

Senator Cavanagh may refer to:

- Daniel Cavanagh (politician) (1830–1901), Wisconsin State Senate
- Mary Cavanagh (born 1991), Michigan State Senate

== See also ==
- Senator Cavanaugh (disambiguation)
- Senator Kavanagh (disambiguation)
