= Frank LaMere =

American politician and activist (1950–2019)

1st Associate Chair of the Nebraska Democratic Party
- In office June 18, 2016 – June 16, 2019
- Succeeded by: Spencer Danner

Personal details
- Born: Franklin Dean LaMere; March 1, 1950 South Sioux City, Nebraska, US
- Died: June 16, 2019 (aged 69) Omaha, Nebraska, US
- Resting place: Winnebago Cemetery
- Party: Democratic Party
- Spouses: Dawn Holliday; Cynthia Marie Rouse
- Occupation: Activist; advocate; politician

Franklin Dean LaMere (March 1, 1950 – June 16, 2019) was an American activist and politician. He was a member of the Winnebago Tribe of Nebraska from South Sioux City, and the son of a Gold Star Mother and a combat veteran father. He was a member of the American Indian Movement (AIM) in the 1970s and was noted for his work opposing liquor sales in Whiteclay, Nebraska, a small town whose main industry is selling alcohol to residents of the nearby Pine Ridge Indian Reservation, where alcohol sales are prohibited. LaMere was a leader in the Democratic Party and served as chairman of the National Native American Caucus. He was a delegate to the Democratic National Convention seven consecutive times from 1988 to 2012.

== Early life and AIM ==
His parents were John LaMere and Matilda Rogue. His brothers included Anthony, David, Darrell, Larry (Wood, previous marriage), Randall and Willard, and his sisters included Laura, Lauren, Candace, Jackie, Michelle and Karen.

LaMere was a member of the American Indian Movement (AIM) in the early 1970s and was active in demands for reform to the Bureau of Indian Affairs. In November 1972, LaMere was a spokesman for a group of AIM members who assembled in front of the federal building in Billings, Montana. Armed guards were posted at the building in response to the assembly, which desired to present a list of demands to the area director of the Bureau of Indian Affairs whose office was in the building. In Billings, LaMere was director of the Wiconi Project in 1973 and the Montana United Indian Association in 1974.

LaMere spoke frequently about stereotypes in the media. In 1984, LaMere's sister, Michelle LaMere, died in a hit-and-run. LaMere used the example of her treatment in the press as an example of the stereotypical treatment of Indians as drunks, rather than innocent victims in his speeches in the late 1980s.

== Athletics ==
LaMere was an athlete as a young man and helped found the all-Native "North Americans" fastpitch softball team in 1989. In the 1990s, LaMere organized 10,000 Sioux, Winnebago, and Omaha who lived in the Sioux City, Iowa, area to protest against the proposed name for the Sioux City minor league baseball team, the Sioux City Soos. The name was changed to the Sioux City Explorers.

In the early 1990s, LaMere was a part of a movement by Santee and Winnebago tribes to seek federal loans to buy back reservation land purchased by non-Indians in deals which he claimed were "less than scrupulous". In 1991, he was the chairman of the twelfth National Indian and Native American Employment and Training Conference in Spokane, Washington.

== Liquor sales in Whiteclay, Nebraska ==
LaMere was involved in a campaign against alcohol sales to Indians in Whiteclay, Nebraska, near the Pine Ridge Indian Reservation in South Dakota. Alcohol sales are prohibited on the reservation. LaMere considered many different tactics to deal with liquor sales at Whiteclay, from protests, to opening an Indian-owned liquor store and using the proceeds to fund a rehabilitation center, to claiming that the town of Whiteclay should be a part of the reservation based on the 1868 Treaty of Fort Laramie.

LaMere along with Russell Means, John Yellow Bird, Tom Poor Bear, Webster Poor Bear, Gary Moore, and Benedict Black Elk were arrested for crossing Nebraska State Patrol police lines during a protest on July 3, 1999. In the fall of 1999, Means and LaMere proposed getting a license to sell beer in Whiteclay, in order to retain some monies to benefit the tribe and build a treatment center on the reservation, but abandoned the project due to disagreement by others of their group. Other activists who worked with LaMere regarding Whiteclay include Clyde Bellecourt and Dennis Banks.

LaMere's activity in the Whiteclay issue continued into 2016. In 2008, film-maker Mark Vasina produced a documentary about the activity in Whiteclay of Lamere, Means, and Duane Martin, Jr., called The Battle for Whiteclay. On May 13, 2019, LaMere received an honorary degree from Nebraska Wesleyan University for his work in Whiteclay.

== Political activities ==
LaMere served as chairman of the Democratic Party's National Native American Caucus. He served as executive director of the Nebraska Inter-Tribal Development Corporation. He was a member of the Nebraska Indian Commission. Frank LaMere was a delegate to the Democratic National Convention seven consecutive times from 1988 to 2012. In the 2010s, he was executive director of the Four Directions center in Sioux City. In 2011 he was awarded the "War Eagle Human Rights award" by the Sioux City Human Rights Commission for his lifelong activity, including his work in Whiteclay and lobbying in support of the 2003 Iowa Indian Child Welfare Act.

LaMere was active in groups opposing the Keystone XL pipeline in the early 2010s, work which brought him in close contact with Bold Nebraska's Jane Fleming Kleeb, husband of Scott Kleeb. Jane became chair of the Nebraska Democratic Party in 2016, and LaMere was elected first associate chair.

== Personal life ==
LaMere was married to Cynthia (Rouse). He had four children, Jennifer, Hazen, Manape Hocinci-ga, and Lexie Wakan. Lexie Wakan died of leukemia in 2014. In early 2012, LaMere suffered a stroke. On June 16, 2019, LaMere died of bile duct cancer, aged 69.
