= Senator Howard =

Senator Howard may refer to:

== Member of the United States Senate ==
- Guy V. Howard (1879–1954), U.S. Senator from Minnesota from 1936 to 1937
- Jacob M. Howard (1805–1871), U.S. Senator from Michigan
- John Eager Howard (1752–1827), U.S. Senator from Maryland from 1796 to 1803

== United States state senate members ==
- Benjamin Chew Howard (1791–1872), Maryland State Senate
- Brent Howard (fl. 2010s–present), Oklahoma State Senate
- Charles John Howard (1862–1928), Ohio State Senate
- Charles P. Howard (politician) (1887–1966), Massachusetts State Senate
- Edward L. Howard (1926–2011), Pennsylvania State Senate
- Gene C. Howard (1926–2021), Oklahoma State Senate
- Glenn L. Howard (1939–2012), Indiana State Senate
- Gwen Howard (born 1945), Nebraska State Senate
- Jaha Howard (fl. 2020s), Georgia State Senate
- Janet C. Howard (fl. 1990s), Ohio State Senate
- Jerry Thomas Howard (born 1936), Missouri State Senate
- John J. Howard (1869–1941), New York State Senate
- Marlene Woodson Howard (born 1937), Florida State Senate
- Pierre Howard (born 1943), Georgia State Senate
- Raymond Howard (Missouri politician) (born 1935), Missouri State Senate
- Robert Howard (unionist) (1845–1902), Massachusetts State Senate
- Sara Howard (politician) (born 1981), Nebraska State Senate
- Taffy Howard (born 1968), South Dakota State Senate
- Timothy Edward Howard (1837–1916), Indiana State Senate
- Vanna Howard (fl. 2020s–present), Massachusetts State Senate
- William Howard (congressman) (1817–1891), Ohio State Senate
