= Jane Kleeb =

American political executive and activist

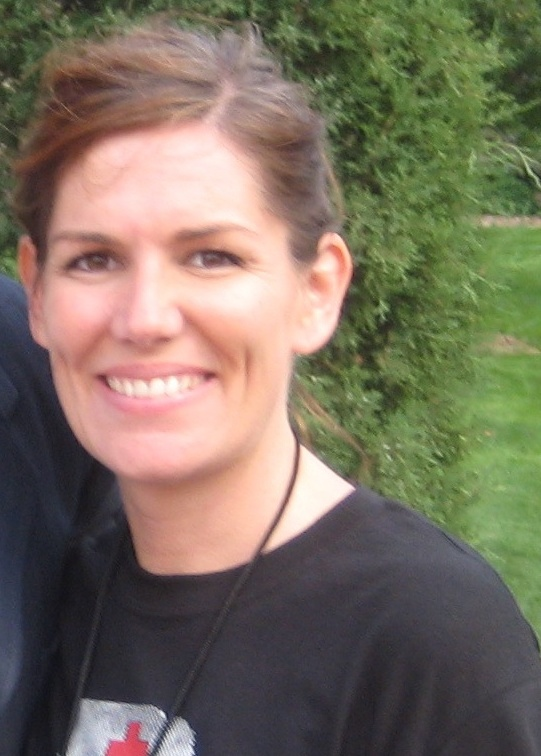

Chair of the Nebraska Democratic Party
- Incumbent
- Assumed office December 17, 2016
- Preceded by: Vince Powers

Personal details
- Born: Jane Fleming; 1973 or 1974 (age 51–52) South Florida, U.S.
- Party: Democratic
- Spouse: Scott Kleeb (m. 2007)
- Children: 3
- Education: Stetson University (BA); American University (MA)

Jane Fleming Kleeb (/klɛb/ KLEB; born 1973/1974) is an American political executive and activist. She is the founder and president of Bold Alliance, Chair of the Nebraska Democratic Party and a board member of Our Revolution and Matriarch PAC.

== Early life and education ==
Kleeb was born and raised in South Florida, where her mother was head of Broward County Right to Life. Kleeb earned a Bachelor of Arts degree from Stetson University in 1995, majoring in religious studies with minors in leadership and in women & gender studies. In 2001, she earned a Master of Arts in international training and education from American University.

== Career ==
Kleeb began her career as executive director of AmeriCorps Tallahassee in 1996. She was executive director of Renfrew Center Foundation for Eating Disorders where she helped to develop a program that stresses activism as a tool for recovery, later she became the lead consultant on the 2006 documentary film Thin. Afterward she became the executive director of Young Democrats of America where she met her husband Scott Kleeb while he was campaigning for a congressional seat. She then worked as an MTV Street Teamer during her husband's 2008 campaign for U.S. Senate. In 2008, she worked as the Nebraska State Director for Change That Works, an effort to influence Senator Ben Nelson's vote on healthcare reform. In 2010, she was elected to the Hastings School Board.

=== Bold Nebraska ===
In 2010 Bold Nebraska was formed with the objective of pushing progressive ideas in rural Nebraska. It quickly became the primary opposition organization in the state against the proposed Keystone XL pipeline.

After witnessing the opposition in a United States Department of State hearing in York, Nebraska Kleeb began organizing locals. She garnered the support of local landowner Randy Thompson and Omaha lawyer David Domina. Kleeb and Thompson held meetings with landowners and locals who would be affected by the pipeline, either farms in the direct path or ranches that depend on the Ogallala Aquifer. In 2011 Thompson was used as the face of the movement with the slogan, "Stand With Randy." The campaign eventually led to the University of Nebraska cutting advertising ties with TransCanada. By the end of 2011 the pipeline had become a national issue.

In 2016 the organization fell under the newly-formed Bold Alliance of which Kleeb is the founder and president.

=== Nebraska Democratic Party ===
In June 2016 Kleeb was elected as chair of the Nebraska Democratic Party by 42 votes out of 410 cast defeating 2014 gubernatorial nominee Chuck Hassebrook, with Frank LaMere winning first vice-chair.

=== Our Revolution ===
On August 29, 2016, it was announced that Kleeb would serve as the treasurer and board member of Our Revolution, a progressive 501(c) organization created as an offshoot of the Bernie Sanders 2016 presidential campaign.

=== DNC ===
On February 1, 2025, Kleeb was elected as president of the Association of State Democratic Committees (ASDC), an internal organization of the Democratic National Committee, succeeding Ken Martin who had served as president since 2017 and was elected as Chair of the DNC on the same day. Kleeb, in her capacity as ASDC president, concurrently serves as a vice chair of the DNC. Kleeb previously served on the executive committees of both the DNC and the ASDC.

== Personal life ==
She lives in Hastings, Nebraska with her husband Scott Kleeb and their three daughters.

Party political offices
| Preceded by Vince Powers | Chair of the Nebraska Democratic Party; 2016–present | Incumbent |
