= Senator Lindsay (disambiguation) =

William Lindsay (Kentucky politician) (1835–1909) was a U.S. Senator from Kentucky from 1893 to 1901. Senator Lindsay may also refer to:

- John Lindsay (Nebraska politician) (born 1959), Nebraska State Senate
- Jon Lindsay (politician) (born 1935), Texas State Senate
- Richard P. Lindsay (1926–2010), Utah State Senate
- Richard Lindsay (West Virginia politician) (fl. 2010s), West Virginia Senate
- Robert B. Lindsay (1824–1902), Alabama State Senate

== See also ==
- Senator Lindsey (disambiguation)
