= Senator Brennan =

Senator Brennan may refer to:

- Bill Brennan (Nebraska politician) (1922–1979), Nebraska State Senate
- Evie Brennan (fl. 2020s), Wyoming State Senate
- James B. Brennan (1926–1999), Wisconsin State Senate
- John A. Brennan Jr. (born 1945), Massachusetts State Senate
- James Henry Brennan (1888–1949), Massachusetts State Senate
- Michael F. Brennan (born 1953), Maine State Senate
- Vincent M. Brennan (1890–1959), Michigan State Senate
- William C. Brennan (1918–2000), New York State Senate
