= Senator Powers =

Senator Powers may refer to:

- Georgia Davis Powers (1923–2016), Kentucky State Senate
- H. Henry Powers (1835–1913), Vermont State Senate
- James E. Powers (born 1931), New York State Senate
- James Powers (New York politician) (1785–1868), New York State Senate
- John E. Powers (1910–1998), Massachusetts State Senate
- Ray Powers (1924–2011), Nebraska State Senate
- Thomas E. Powers (1808–1876), Vermont State Senate
