= Senator Cavanaugh =

Senator Cavanaugh

- John Joseph Cavanaugh III (born 1945), Nebraska State Senate
- John Cavanaugh (politician) (born 1980), Nebraska State Senate
- Kevin Cavanaugh (fl. 2010s–2020s), New Hampshire State Senate
- Machaela Cavanaugh (born 1979), Nebraska State Senate

== See also ==
- Senator Cavanagh (disambiguation)
- Senator Kavanagh (disambiguation)
