= Senator Lindsey =

Senator Lindsey may refer to:

- Coleman Lindsey (died 1968), Louisiana State Senate
- Jonathan Lindsey (born 1984), Michigan State Senate
- Pat Lindsey (1936–2009), Alabama State Senate
- Stephen Lindsey (1828–1884), Maine State Senate
- Uvalde Lindsey (1940–2025), Arkansas State Senate

== See also ==
- Senator Lindsay (disambiguation)
- Senator Lindsley (disambiguation)
