= 2000 United States House of Representatives elections in Nebraska =

- November 7, 2000

All 3 Nebraska seats to the United States House of Representatives
	Majority party	Minority party
Party	Republican	Democratic
Last election	3	0
Seats won	3	0
Seat change	Steady	Steady
Popular vote	486,513	178,071
Percentage	71.22%	26.07%

The 2000 United States House of Representatives elections in Nebraska were held on November 7, 2000, to elect the state of Nebraska's three members to the United States House of Representatives.

== Overview ==
2000 United States House of Representatives elections in Nebraska
Party	Votes	Percentage	Seats	+/–
Republican	486,513	71.22%	3	Steady
Democratic	178,071	26.07%	0	Steady
Libertarian	17,912	2.62%	0	—
Write-ins	575	0.08%	0	—
Totals	683,071	100.00%	3	—

== District 1 ==
2000 Nebraska's 1st congressional district election
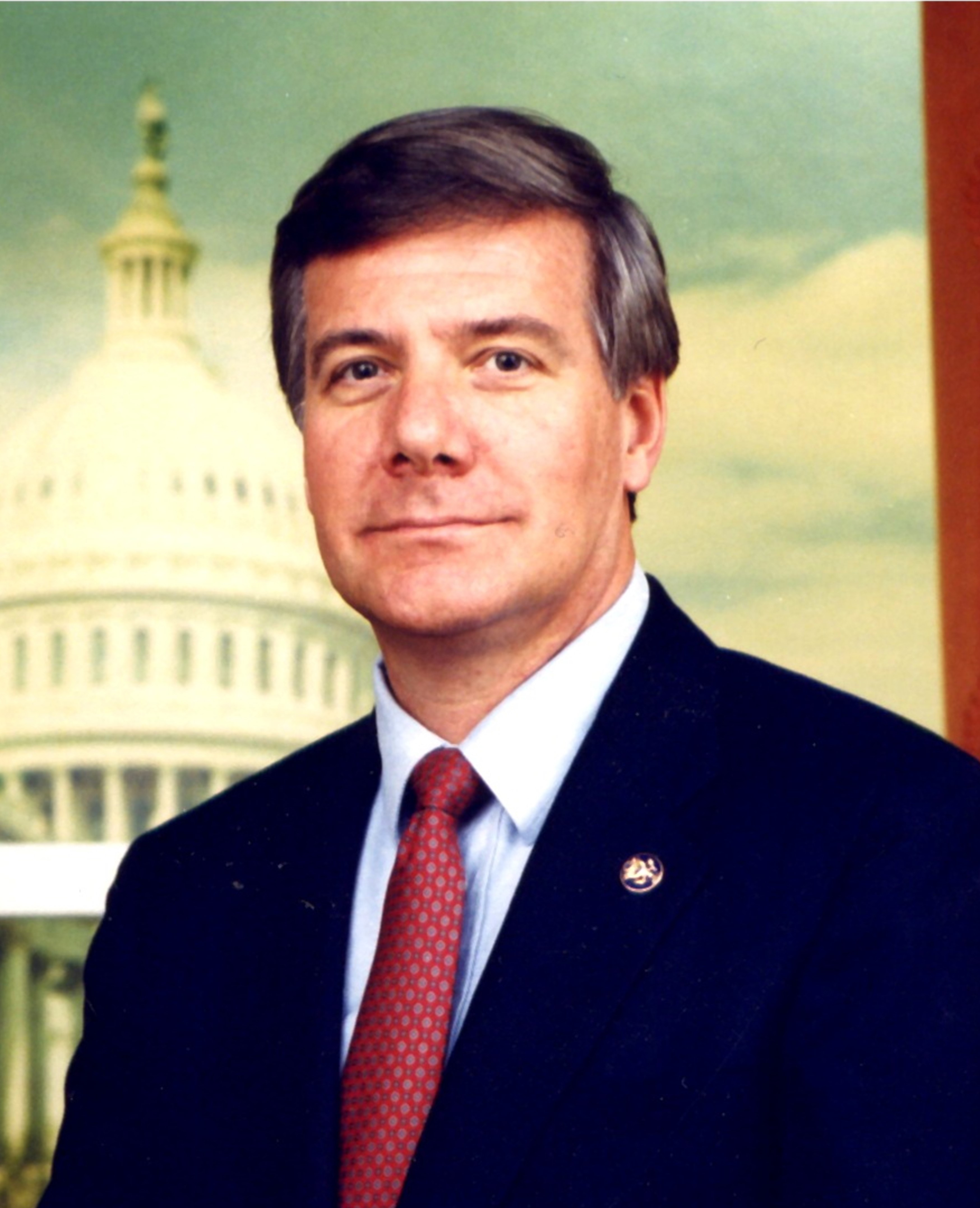

Nominee	Doug Bereuter	Alan Jacobsen
Party	Republican	Democratic
Popular vote	155,485	72,859
Percentage	66.3%	31.0%
U.S. Representative before election
Doug Bereuter
Republican
Elected U.S. Representative
Doug Bereuter
Republican

Incumbent Republican Congressman Doug Bereuter ran for re-election. He was challenged by the Democratic nominee, Lincoln businessman Alan Jacobsen, a former Republican who ran for Governor in 1994, and Libertarian nominee David Oenbring, a tax preparer. Bereuter won re-election in a landslide, receiving 66 percent of the vote to Jacobsen's 31 percent and Oenbring's 3 percent.

=== Republican primary ===
==== Candidates ====
- Doug Bereuter, incumbent U.S. Representative

==== Results ====
Republican primary results
Party	Candidate	Votes	%
Republican	Doug Bereuter (inc.)	50,365	98.99%
Republican	Write-ins	516	1.01%
Total votes		50,881	100.00%

=== Democratic primary ===
==== Candidates ====
- Alan Jacobsen, businessman, 1994 Republican candidate for Governor

==== Results ====
Democratic primary results
Party	Candidate	Votes	%
Democratic	Alan Jacobsen	25,940	99.02%
Democratic	Write-ins	256	0.98%
Total votes		26,196	100.00%

=== Libertarian primary ===
==== Candidates ====
- David Oenbring, tax preparer

==== Results ====
Libertarian primary results
Party	Candidate	Votes	%
Libertarian	David Oenbring	77	98.72%
Libertarian	Write-ins	1	1.28%
Total votes		78	100.00%

=== General election ===
==== Candidates ====
- Doug Bereuter (Republican)
- Alan Jacobsen (Democratic)
- David Oenbring (Libertarian)

==== Results ====
2000 Nebraska's 1st congressional district general election results
Party	Candidate	Votes	%
Republican	Doug Bereuter (inc.)	155,485	66.25%
Democratic	Alan Jacobsen	72,859	31.04%
Libertarian	David Oenbring	6,147	2.62%
Write-ins		207	0.09%
Total votes		234,698	100.00%
Republican hold			

== District 2 ==
2000 Nebraska's 2nd congressional district election
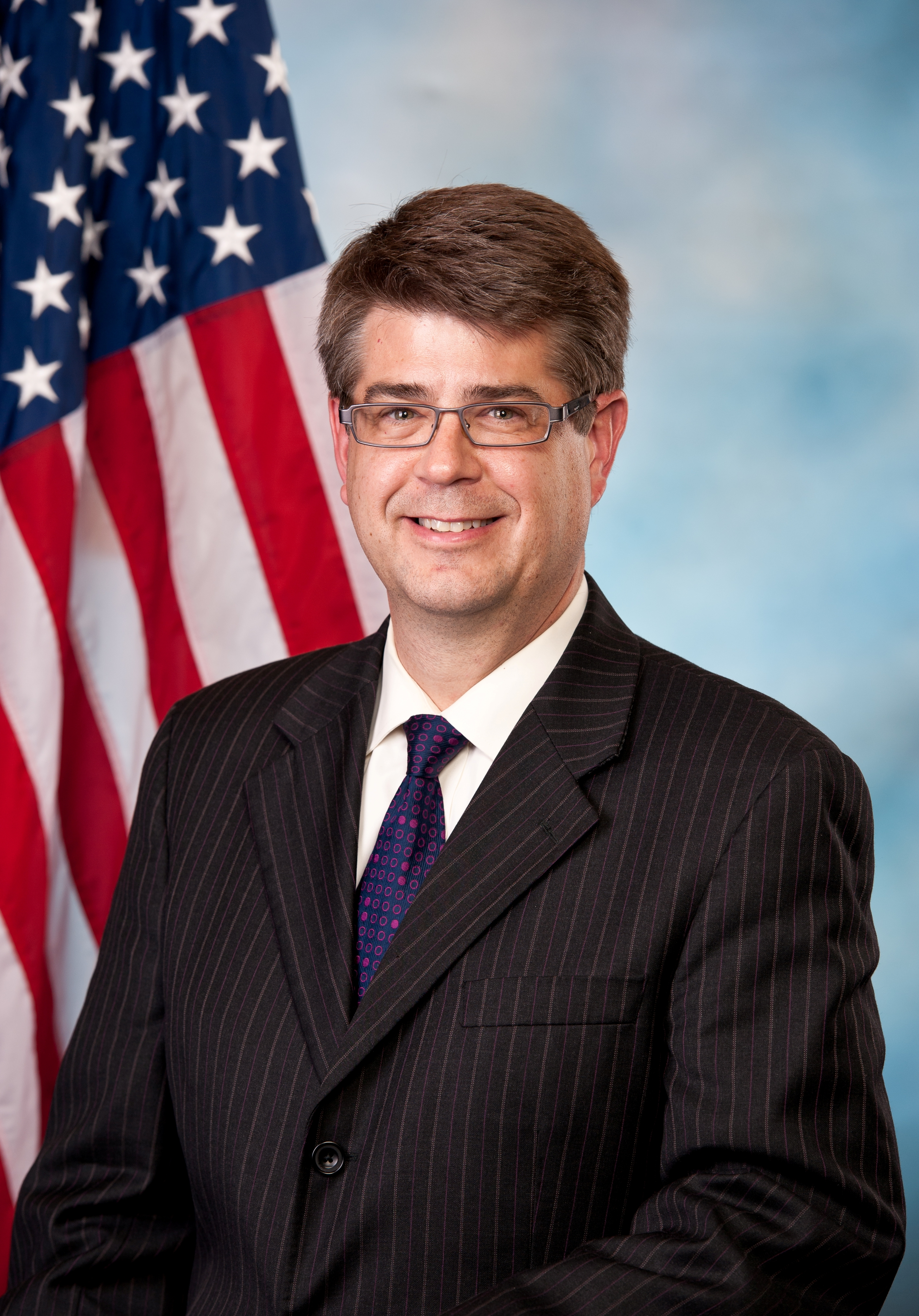

Nominee	Lee Terry	Shelley Kiel
Party	Republican	Democratic
Popular vote	148,911	70,268
Percentage	65.8%	31.1%
U.S. Representative before election
Lee Terry
Republican
Elected U.S. Representative
Lee Terry
Republican

Incumbent Republican Congressman Lee Terry ran for re-election to a second term. He was challenged in the general election by State Senator Shelley Kiel, the Democratic nominee, and salesman John Graziano, the Libertarian nominee. Terry defeated both to win landslide by a wide margin, receiving 66 percent of the vote to Kiel's 31 and Graziano's 3 percent.

=== Republican primary ===
==== Candidates ====
- Lee Terry, incumbent U.S. Representative

==== Results ====
Republican primary results
Party	Candidate	Votes	%
Republican	Lee Terry (inc.)	55,696	98.66%
Republican	Write-ins	758	1.34%
Total votes		56,454	100.00%

=== Democratic primary ===
==== Candidates ====
- Shelley Kiel, State Senator
- Allen C. Johnson, attorney, retired U.S. Air Force major

==== Results ====
Democratic primary results
Party	Candidate	Votes	%
Democratic	Shelley Kiel	30,578	69.61%
Democratic	Allen C. Johnson	13,092	29.80%
Democratic	Write-ins	259	0.59%
Total votes		43,929	100.00%

=== Libertarian primary ===
==== Candidates ====
- John J. Graziano, salesman

==== Results ====
Libertarian primary results
Party	Candidate	Votes	%
Libertarian	John J. Graziano	118	95.16%
Libertarian	Write-ins	6	4.84%
Total votes		124	100.00%

=== General election ===
==== Candidates ====
- Lee Terry (Republican)
- Shelley Kiel (Democratic)
- John J. Graziano (Libertarian)

==== Results ====
2000 Nebraska's 2nd congressional district general election results
Party	Candidate	Votes	%
Republican	Lee Terry (inc.)	148,911	65.81%
Democratic	Shelley Kiel	70,268	31.05%
Libertarian	John J. Graziano	6,856	3.03%
Write-ins		245	0.11%
Total votes		226,280	100.00%
Republican hold			

== District 3 ==
2000 Nebraska's 3rd congressional district election
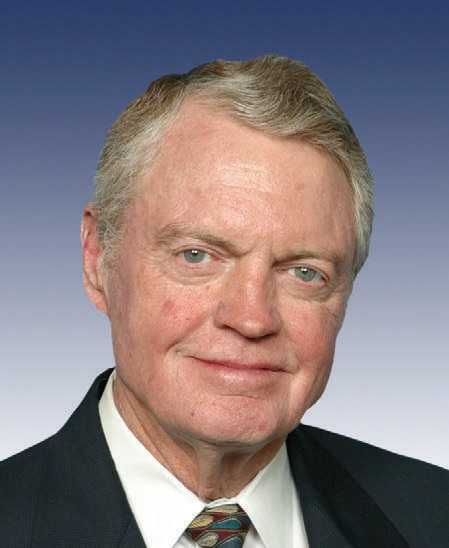

Nominee	Tom Osborne	Roland E. Reynolds
Party	Republican	Democratic
Popular vote	182,117	34,944
Percentage	82.0%	15.7%
U.S. Representative before election
Bill Barrett
Republican
Elected U.S. Representative
Tom Osborne
Republican

Republican Congressman Bill Barrett opted to retire rather than seek re-election to a sixth term. Tom Osborne, the former head coach of the Nebraska Cornhuskers football team, ran to succeed Barrett, despite not living in the district. He defeated attorney John A. Gale and State Board of Education member Kathy Wilmot in the Republican primary and faced real estate investor Roland E. Reynolds, the Democratic nominee, and Jerry Hickman, the Libertarian nominee, in the general election. Osborne defeated both in a landslide, winning 82 percent of the vote.

=== Republican primary ===
==== Candidates ====
- Tom Osborne, former University of Nebraska head football coach
- John A. Gale, attorney, former aide to U.S. Senator Roman Hruska
- Kathy Wilmot, member of the State Board of Education

==== Results ====
Republican primary results
Party	Candidate	Votes	%
Republican	Tom Osborne	52,438	70.71%
Republican	John A. Gale	12,573	16.95%
Republican	Kathy Wilmot	9,127	12.31%
Republican	Write-ins	26	0.04%
Total votes		74,164	100.00%

=== Democratic primary ===
==== Candidates ====
- Roland E. Reynolds, real estate investor

==== Results ====
Democratic primary results
Party	Candidate	Votes	%
Democratic	Roland E. Reynolds	23,364	98.84%
Democratic	Write-ins	275	1.16%
Total votes		23,639	100.00%

=== Libertarian primary ===
==== Candidates ====
- Jerry Hickman, U.S. Marine Corps veteran, 1998 Libertarian candidate for Congress

==== Results ====
Libertarian primary results
Party	Candidate	Votes	%
Libertarian	Jerry Hickman	37	88.10%
Libertarian	Write-ins	5	11.90%
Total votes		42	100.00%

=== General election ===
==== Candidates ====
- Tom Osborne (Republican)
- Roland E. Reynolds (Democratic)
- Jerry Hickman (Libertarian)

==== Results ====
2000 Nebraska's 3rd congressional district general election results
Party	Candidate	Votes	%
Republican	Tom Osborne	182,117	82.00%
Democratic	Roland E. Reynolds	34,944	15.73%
Libertarian	Jerry Hickman	4,909	2.21%
Write-ins		123	0.06%
Total votes		222,093	100.00%
Republican hold			

== See also ==
- 2000 United States House of Representatives elections
