= Senator Lindsley =

Senator Lindsley may refer to:

- Adrian Van Sinderen Lindsley (1814–1885), Tennessee State Senate
- M. P. Lindsley (1825–1883), Wisconsin State Senate

== See also ==
- Senator Lindsey (disambiguation)
