= Marge Higgins =

American politician (1931–2015)

Member of the Nebraska Legislature from the 9th district
- In office December 2, 1980 – January 4, 1989
- Preceded by: Ray Powers
- Succeeded by: John Lindsay

Personal details
- Born: August 3, 1931 Lincoln, Nebraska
- Died: December 2, 2015 (aged 84) Omaha, Nebraska
- Party: Democratic
- Spouse: David Higgins (m. 1956; died 2013)
- Relatives: Anne Boyle (niece)
- Education: Mount Saint Joseph Junior College for Women
- Occupation: Real estate investor

Margaret "Marge" Higgins (née Andreasen, August 3, 1931 – December 2, 2015) was a Democratic politician from Nebraska who served as a member of the Nebraska Legislature from the 9th district from 1980 to 1989.

== Early life ==
Margaret Andreasen was born in 1931 in Lincoln, Nebraska. She graduated from Cathedral High School and moved to Kentucky to attend the Mount Saint Joseph Junior College for Women and enter a convent, but dropped out before taking her vows. She married David Higgins, a supervisor at the U.S. penitentiary in Leavenworth, Kansas, and they relocated to Omaha. She worked with her brother-in-law, Douglas County Treasurer Sam Howell, and owned a commercial insurance firm with him, and was appointed to the Omaha Mayor's Commission on the Status of Women, and advocated for improving jail conditions. She served as the chair of the Douglas County Democratic Party from 1974 to 1976.

== Nebraska Legislature ==
In 1980, Higgins announced that she would challenge appointed State Senator Ray Powers in the 9th district, which was based in downtown Omaha. In the nonpartisan election, Higgins faced Powers and construction worker John Cronin and University of Nebraska at Omaha student Randy Stevenson. Higgins placed second in the primary, winning 38 percent of the vote to Powers's 43 percent, and they advanced to the general election. In the general election, Higgins defeated Powers by a narrow margin, winning 51–49 percent.

Following Higgins's victory, Powers resigned from the legislature early, and Higgins was appointed to serve out the remaining month of his term. She was sworn in on December 2, 1980.

Higgins ran for re-election in 1984, and was challenged by C. Bruce Davis, the chairman of the Nebraska Commission on Aging. In the primary election, Higgins placed first by a wide margin, winning 62 percent of the vote to Davis's 38 percent. Higgins only narrowly defeated Davis in the general election, winning her second term with 52 percent of the vote.

In 1985, Higgins announced that she would run for Governor in 1986. She contracted a severe case of the flu during the campaign, and was absent from the campaign trail for six weeks in the months leading up to the primary election. However, after receiving a "clean bill of health" from her doctor, she continued her campaign. However, she ended up finishing a distant fifth in the Democratic primary, receiving 3 percent of the vote.

Higgins declined to seek a third term in the legislature in 1988.

== Death ==
Higgins died on December 2, 2015.
