= 2026 United States House of Representatives elections in Nebraska =

- November 3, 2026

All 3 Nebraska seats to the United States House of Representatives
	Majority party	Minority party
Party	Republican	Democratic
Last election	3	0
Seats won	2	1
Seat change	▼1	▲1
Popular vote	408,900	318,197
Percentage	53.42%	41.57%
Swing	▼10.2%	▲5.19%

Republican hold
Democratic gain
Republican
40–50%
50–60%
60–70%
70–80%
80–90%
90–100%
Democratic
40–50%
50–60%

The 2026 United States House of Representatives elections in Nebraska were held on November 3, 2026, to elect the three U.S. representatives from the state of Nebraska, one from each of the state's congressional districts. The elections coincided with other elections to the House of Representatives, elections to the United States Senate, and various state and local elections. Primary elections took place on May 12, 2026.

Democrats flipped the 2nd district, winning it for the first time since 2014.

== Statewide polling ==
=== Statewide congressional polls ===
Poll source	Date(s) administered	Sample size (Note: Key: A – all adults RV – registered voters LV – likely voters V – unclear)	Margin of error	Republican	Democratic	Other	Undecided
Concord Public Opinion Partners (D) (Note: Poll sponsored by Education Reform Now Advocacy)	October 15–18, 2026	500 (LV)	± 4.38%	45%	43%	6% (Note: "Someone else" with 6%)	7%

== District 1 ==
2026 Nebraska's 1st congressional district election
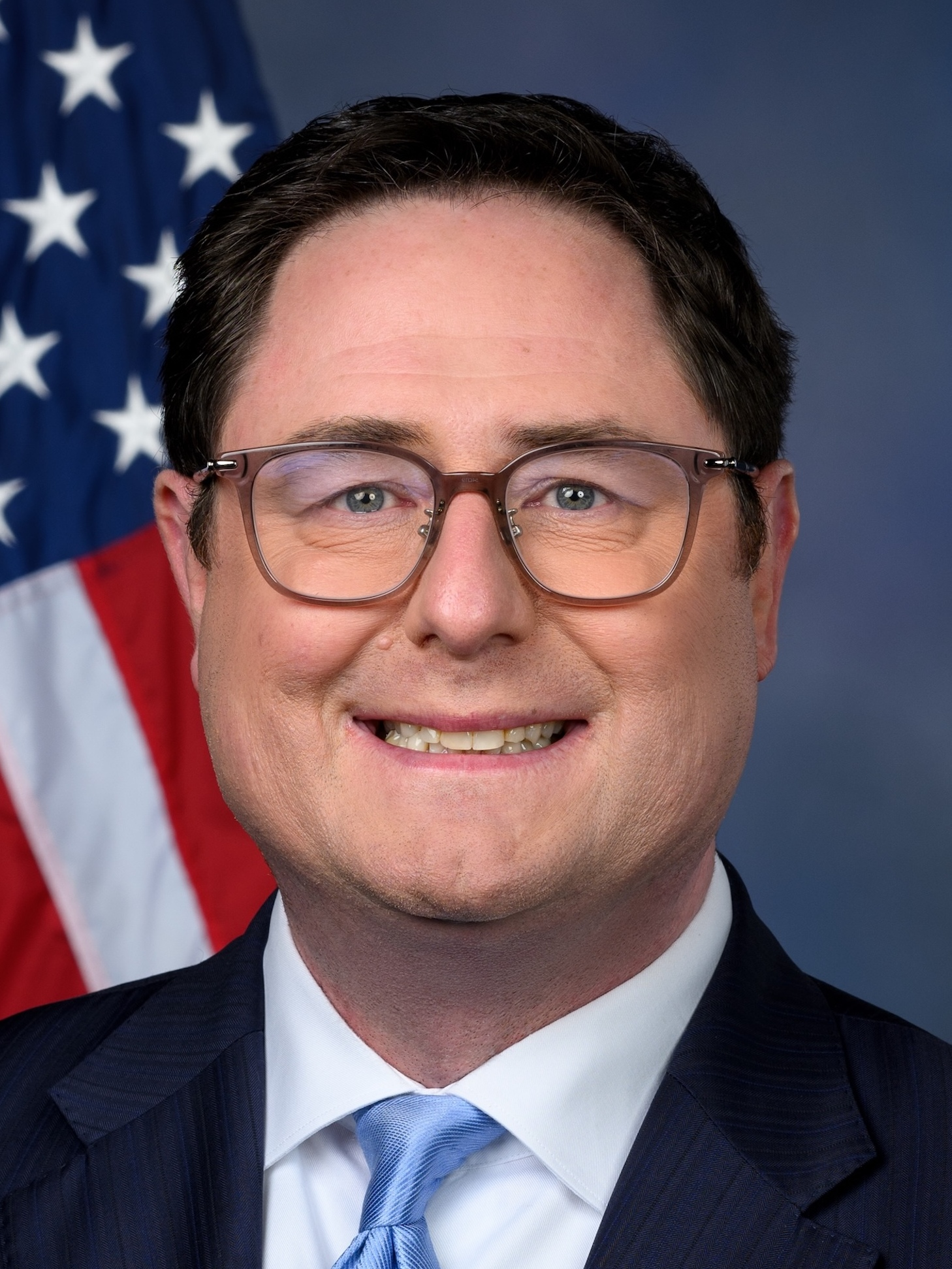

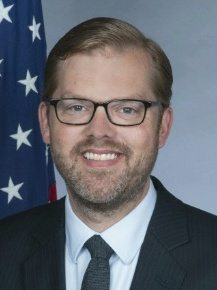
Nominee	Mike Flood	Chris Backemeyer
Party	Republican	Democratic
Popular vote	128,863	121,346
Percentage	49.7%	46.8%
- Flood: 60–70% 70–80% Backemeyer: 50–60%
U.S. Representative before election
Mike Flood
Republican
Elected U.S. Representative
Mike Flood
Republican

The 1st district is located in eastern Nebraska surrounding Omaha and its suburbs, taking in Lincoln, Bellevue, Fremont, and Norfolk. The incumbent is Republican Mike Flood, who was re-elected with 60.1% of the vote in 2024.

=== Republican primary ===
==== Candidates ====
===== Nominee =====
- Mike Flood, incumbent U.S. representative (2022–present)

==== Endorsements ====
Mike Flood

Executive branch officials

- Donald Trump, president of the United States (2017–2021, 2025–present)

Organizations

- AIPAC

==== Fundraising ====
Campaign finance reports as of December 31, 2025
Candidate	Raised	Spent	Cash on hand
Mike Flood (R)	$1,561,367	$579,558	$1,202,590
Source: Federal Election Commission

==== Results ====
Republican primary results
Party	Candidate	Votes	%
Republican	Mike Flood (incumbent)	53,094	100.0
Total votes		53,094	100.0

=== Democratic primary ===
==== Candidates ====
===== Nominee =====
- Chris Backemeyer, former deputy assistant secretary of state

===== Eliminated in primary =====
- Eric Moyer, renewable energy developer

==== Fundraising ====
Campaign finance reports as of December 31, 2025
Candidate	Raised	Spent	Cash on hand
Chris Backemeyer (D)	$157,269	$32,078	$125,190
Eric Moyer (D)	$20,882	$16,809	$5,017
Source: Federal Election Commission

==== Results ====
County results Backemeyer: Backemeyer—50–60%; Backemeyer—60–70%; Moyer: Moyer—50–60%

Democratic primary results
Party	Candidate	Votes	%
Democratic	Chris Backemeyer	26,523	57.6
Democratic	Eric Moyer	19,508	42.4
Total votes		46,031	100.0

=== Libertarian primary ===
==== Candidates ====
===== Nominee =====
- Nik Sandman, retired farmer

==== Results ====
Libertarian primary results
Party	Candidate	Votes	%
Libertarian	Nik Sandman	479	100.0
Total votes		479	100.0

=== America First Party ===
==== Nominee ====
- Daniel Hartong

=== Independents ===
==== Candidates ====
===== Withdrawn =====
- Austin Ahlman, investigative reporter for The Intercept

==== Endorsements ====
Austin Ahlman (withdrawn)

Organizations

- Track AIPAC

=== General election ===
==== Predictions ====
Source	Ranking	As of
Decision Desk HQ	Likely R	July 14, 2026
The Cook Political Report	Likely R	October 16, 2026
Inside Elections	Likely R	October 15, 2026
Sabato's Crystal Ball	Likely R	October 20, 2026

==== Post-primary endorsements ====
Chris Backemeyer (D)

U.S. representatives

- Greg Stanton, AZ-04 (2019–present)

Labor unions

- National Education Association

Organizations

- J Street
- NewDem Action Fund

==== Polling ====
Poll source	Date(s) administered	Sample size	Margin of error	Mike Flood (R)	Chris Backemeyer (D)	Other	Undecided
Public Policy Polling (D) (Note: Poll sponsored by the House Majority PAC, which is focused on electing Democrats to the U.S. House of Representatives)	October 19–20, 2026	536 (LV)	–	46%	45%	–	9%
Global Strategy Group (D) (Note: Poll sponsored by Fight for Nebraska PAC)	August 31 – September 3, 2026	600 (LV)	± 4.0%	42%	43%	7% (Note: "Third party" with 7%)	7%
Global Strategy Group (D)	August 31 – September 3, 2026	600 (LV)	± 4.0%	45%	49%	–	6%
Tavern Research (D)	May 16–19, 2026	1,079 (LV)	± 3.9%	41%	33%	9% (Note: Austin Ahlman (I) with 9%)	17%
Tavern Research (D)	May 16–19, 2026	1,079 (LV)	± 3.9%	45%	43%	–	12%
Zenith Research (D)	May 8–11, 2026	371 (LV)	± 5.1%	45%	38%	–	17%

Hypothetical polling

Mike Flood (R) vs. Austin Ahlman (I)

Poll source	Date(s) administered	Sample size	Margin of error	Mike Flood (R)	Austin Ahlman (I)	Undecided
Tavern Research (D)	May 16–19, 2026	1,079 (LV)	± 3.9%	41%	36%	23%
Zenith Research (D)	May 8–11, 2026	371 (LV)	± 5.1%	44%	36%	20%

==== Fundraising ====
Campaign finance reports as of October 14, 2026
Candidate	Raised	Spent	Cash on hand
Mike Flood (R)	$2,770,861.42	$2,131,738.08	$859,905.11
Chris Backemeyer (D)	$1,154,612.70	$799,446.75	$355,165.95
Nik Sandman (L)	$0	$0	$0
Daniel Hartong (AF)	$0	$0	$0
Source: Federal Election Commission

==== Debate ====
2026 Nebraska's 1st congressional district debate
No.	Date	Host	Moderator	Link	Republican	Democratic
Key: P Participant A Absent N Not invited I Invited W Withdrawn						
Key: P Participant A Absent N Not invited I Invited W Withdrawn					Mike Flood	Chris Backemeyer
1	Sep. 23, 2026	Nebraska Public Media; Omaha World-Herald; Rural Radio Network	Jackie Ourada; Aaron Sanderford	YouTube	P	P

==== Results ====
2026 Nebraska's 1st congressional district election
Party	Candidate	Votes	%	±%
Republican	Mike Flood (incumbent)			
Democratic	Chris Backemeyer			
Libertarian	Nik Sandman			
America First	Daniel Hartong			
Total votes				

== District 2 ==
2026 Nebraska's 2nd congressional district election

Nominee	Denise Powell	Brinker Harding
Party	Democratic	Republican
Popular vote	147,699	105,417
Percentage	56.8%	40.6%
- Powell: 50–60% Harding: 50–60% 60–70%
U.S. Representative before election
Don Bacon
Republican
Elected U.S. Representative
Denise Powell
Democratic

The 2nd district covers the Omaha metropolitan area, including all of Douglas County, home to the city of Omaha, Saunders County, and parts of western Sarpy County, including Gretna and Springfield. The incumbent is Republican Don Bacon, who was re-elected with 50.9% of the vote in 2024. On June 30, 2025, Bacon announced he would not seek re-election. Bacon is one of only three Republicans in the 119th Congress to represent a district that was carried by Democrat Kamala Harris in the 2024 presidential election, making this race a key Democratic target.

=== Republican primary ===
==== Candidates ====
===== Nominee =====
- Brinker Harding, Omaha city councilor from the 6th district (2017–present)

===== Withdrawn =====
- Brett Lindstrom, former state senator from the 18th district (2015–2023), candidate for this district in 2012, and candidate for governor in 2022 (ran for governor as an independent)

===== Declined =====
- Don Bacon, incumbent U.S. representative (endorsed Harding)
- Chris Chappelear, former chair of the Nebraska Federation of Young Republicans
- Aaron Hanson, Douglas County sheriff
- Aimee Melton, Omaha city councilor from the 7th district (2013–present) (endorsed Harding)

==== Endorsements ====
Brinker Harding

Executive branch officials

- Donald Trump, president of the United States (2017–2021, 2025–present)

U.S. senators

- Deb Fischer, Nebraska (2013–present)
- Pete Ricketts, Nebraska (2023–present)

U.S. representatives

- Don Bacon, NE-02 (2017–present)
- Hal Daub, former NE-02 (1981–1989)
- Mike Flood, NE-01 (2022–present)
- Richard Hudson, NC-09 (2013–present)
- Adrian Smith, NE-03 (2007–present)

Statewide officials

- Dave Heineman, former governor of Nebraska (2005–2015)
- Mike Hilgers, attorney general of Nebraska (2023–present)
- Bob Evnen, secretary of state of Nebraska (2019–present)
- Jim Pillen, governor of Nebraska (2023–present)
- Joey Spellerberg, treasurer of Nebraska (2025–present)

State legislators

- Kathleen Kauth, state senator from the 31st district (2022–present)
- Rita Sanders, state senator from the 45th district (2021–present)

Organizations

- NRCC MAGA Majority
Brett Lindstrom (withdrawn)

State legislators

- Christy Armendariz, state senator from the 18th district
- Tom Brewer, former state senator from the 43rd district
- Rita Sanders, state senator from the 45th district

==== Fundraising ====
Italics indicate a withdrawn candidate.

Campaign finance reports as of March 31, 2026
Candidate	Raised	Spent	Cash on hand
Brinker Harding (R)	$1,270,418	$621,732	$648,686
Brett Lindstrom (R)	$374,138	$224,322	$149,815
Source: Federal Election Commission

==== Results ====
Republican primary results
Party	Candidate	Votes	%
Republican	Brinker Harding	39,689	100.0
Total votes		39,689	100.0

=== Democratic primary ===
==== Candidates ====
===== Nominee =====
- Denise Powell, candidate training group co-founder

===== Eliminated in primary =====
- Van Argyrakis, attorney and perennial candidate
- Kishla Askins, former deputy assistant secretary at the U.S. Department of Veterans Affairs (2022–2024)
- John Cavanaugh, state senator from the 9th district (2021–present) and son of former U.S. Representative John J. Cavanaugh III
- Crystal Rhoades, Douglas County District court clerk (2023–present) and former Nebraska Public Service Commissioner (2015–2023)
- Melanie Williams, candidate for state legislature in 2020

===== Withdrawn =====
- Mark Johnston, ophthalmologist
- James Leuschen, former policy director for House Majority Leader Steny Hoyer (remained on ballot)

===== Declined =====
- Tony Vargas, former state senator and nominee for this district in 2022 and 2024 (endorsed Powell, running for Douglas County treasurer)

==== Endorsements ====
Kishla Askins

Organizations

- Joint Action Committee for Political Affairs
- VoteVets
John Cavanaugh

U.S. senators

- Bob Kerrey, Nebraska (1989–2001)
- Ben Nelson, Nebraska (2001–2013)

U.S. representatives

- Maxwell Frost, FL-10 (2023–present)
- Pramila Jayapal, WA-07 (2017–present)
- Ro Khanna, CA-17 (2017–present)
- Jamie Raskin, MD-08 (2017–present)

State legislators

- Danielle Conrad, state senator from the 46th district) (2023–present)
- George Dungan, state senator from the 26th district (2023–present)
- Ashlei Spivey, state senator from the 13th district (2025–present)
- 4 other state senators

Labor unions

- Brotherhood of Locomotive Engineers and Trainmen Nebraska Legislative Board
- International Brotherhood of Electrical Workers Locals 1521, 1483 and 763

Organizations

- Congressional Progressive Caucus PAC
- End Citizens United
- J Street PAC
- National Committee to Preserve Social Security and Medicare
- Sierra Club
Denise Powell

U.S. representatives

- Annie Kuster, former NH-02 (2013–2025)
- Emily Randall, WA-06 (2025-present)
- Andrea Salinas, OR-06 (2003–present)
- Linda Sánchez, CA-38 (2003–present)
- Greg Stanton, AZ-04 (2019–present)
- Norma Torres, CA-35 (2003–present)

State legislators

- Dunixi Guereca, state senator from the 7th district (2025–present)
- Margo Juarez, state senator from the 5th district (2025–present)
- Tony Vargas, former state senator from the 7th district (2017–2025)

Local officials

- Leirion Gaylor Baird, mayor of Lincoln (2019–present)

Organizations

- Congressional Hispanic Caucus BOLD PAC
- Elect Democratic Women
- EMILY's List
- Latino Victory Fund
- NewDem Action Fund
- PODER PAC
- Vote Mama
Crystal Rhoades

Local officials

- John Ewing Jr., mayor of Omaha (2025–present)
Declined to endorse

State legislators

- Megan Hunt, state senator from the 8th district (2019–present) (Independent)

==== Fundraising ====
Italics indicate a withdrawn candidate.

Campaign finance reports as of March 31, 2026
Candidate	Raised	Spent	Cash on hand
Kishla Askins (D)	$583,723	$445,682	$138,042
John Cavanaugh (D)	$1,140,783	$981,801	$158,983
Mark Johnston (D)	$10,146	$9,298	$847
James Leuschen (D)	$389,591	$219,849	$169,742
Denise Powell (D)	$1,617,997	$1,294,016	$323,981
Crystal Rhoades (D)	$172,768	$144,759	$28,010
Source: Federal Election Commission

==== Polling ====
Poll source	Date(s) administered	Sample size	Margin of error	Kishla Askins	John Cavanaugh	Denise Powell	Crystal Rhoades	Other	Undecided
GBAO (D) (Note: Poll sponsored by Cavanaugh's campaign)	January 8–12, 2026	600 (LV)	± 4.0%	4%	43%	10%	15%	3% (Note: Leuschen with 3%)	24%
GBAO (D)	July 21–23, 2025	400 (LV)	± 4.4%	4%	36%	9%	15%	5% (Note: Johnston with 5%)	29%

==== Results ====
County results Powell: Powell—30–40%; Powell—40–50%

Democratic primary results
Party	Candidate	Votes	%
Democratic	Denise Powell	22,516	38.8
Democratic	John Cavanaugh	21,115	36.4
Democratic	Crystal Rhoades	8,180	14.1
Democratic	Kishla Askins	3,499	6.0
Democratic	Melanie Williams	2,222	3.8
Democratic	James Leuschen (withdrawn)	320	0.6
Democratic	Van Argyrakis	152	0.3
Total votes		58,004	100.0

=== Libertarian primary ===
==== Candidates ====
===== Nominee =====
- Eric Foreman

==== Results ====
Libertarian primary results
Party	Candidate	Votes	%
Libertarian	Eric Foreman	388	100.0
Total votes		388	100.0

=== Independents ===
==== Candidates ====
===== Declined =====
- Megan Hunt, state senator from the 8th district (2019–present)
- Dan Osborn, former president of Bakery, Confectionery, Tobacco Workers and Grain Millers International Union Local 50G and candidate for U.S. Senate in 2024 (running for U.S. Senate)

=== General election ===
==== Predictions ====
Source	Ranking	As of
Decision Desk HQ	Safe D (flip)	November 3, 2026
The Cook Political Report	Likely D (flip)	October 9, 2026
Inside Elections	Lean D (flip)	October 15, 2026
Sabato's Crystal Ball	Likely D (flip)	October 8, 2026

==== Post-primary endorsements ====
Brinker Harding (R)

U.S. representatives

- Mike Johnson, speaker of the House (2023–present) from LA-04 (2017–present)
Denise Powell (D)

Executive branch officials

- Pete Buttigieg, former secretary of transportation (2021–2025)

Labor unions

- American Federation of Government Employees
- National Education Association

Organizations

- End Citizens United
- Giffords
- Human Rights Campaign
- Planned Parenthood Action Fund
- Reproductive Freedom for All

==== Fundraising ====
Campaign finance reports as of October 14, 2026
Candidate	Raised	Spent	Cash on hand
Brinker Harding (R)	$2,850,577	$2,537,204	$313,373
Denise Powell (D)	$5,093,104	$4,612,631	$480,473
Eric Foreman (L)	$0	$0	$0
Source: Federal Election Commission

==== Polling ====
Poll source	Date(s) administered	Sample size	Margin of error	Brinker Harding (R)	Denise Powell (D)	Other	Undecided
National Public Affairs	October 2–5, 2026	800 (LV)	± 5.0%	38%	50% (Note: Including voters who lean towards a given candidate)	6% (Note: Eric Foreman (L) with 6%)	6%
SurveyUSA (Note: Poll sponsored by Grant Forbes, LLC.)	September 8–13, 2026	182 (LV)	± 12.2%	42%	46%	4% (Note: "Another candidate" with 4%)	9%

==== Results ====
2026 Nebraska's 2nd congressional district election
Party	Candidate	Votes	%	±%
Democratic	Denise Powell	145,402	56.69	
Republican	Brinker Harding	104,498	40.72	
Libertarian	Eric Foreman	6,677	2.60	
Total votes		256,577	100%	

== District 3 ==
2026 Nebraska's 3rd congressional district election
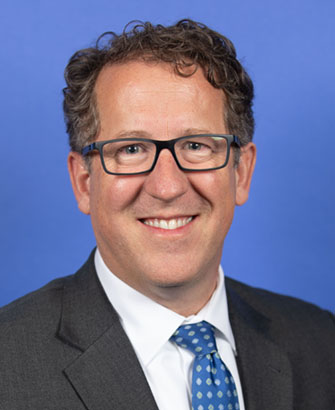

Nominee	Adrian Smith	Becky Stille
Party	Republican	Democratic
Popular vote	174,620	49,152
Percentage	71%	20%
- Smith: 40–50% 50–60% 60–70% 70–80% 80–90% >90%
U.S. Representative before election
Adrian Smith
Republican
Elected U.S. Representative
Adrian Smith
Republican

The 3rd district covers most of the rural central and western part of the state, and includes Grand Island, Kearney, Hastings, North Platte, Alliance, and Scottsbluff. The incumbent is Republican Adrian Smith, who was re-elected with 80.4% of the vote in 2024.

=== Republican primary ===
==== Candidates ====
===== Nominee =====
- Adrian Smith, incumbent U.S. representative

===== Eliminated in primary =====
- David Huebner, farmer and restaurant owner

==== Endorsements ====
Adrian Smith

Executive branch officials

- Donald Trump, president of the United States (2017–2021, 2025–present)

Organizations

- AIPAC

==== Fundraising ====
Campaign finance reports as of December 31, 2025
Candidate	Raised	Spent	Cash on hand
David Huebner (R)	$25,235	$19,186	$6,049
Adrian Smith (R)	$1,132,841	$720,316	$1,340,757
Source: Federal Election Commission

==== Results ====
County results Smith: Smith—50–60%; Smith—60–70%; Smith—70–80%; Smith—80–90%; Huebner: Huebner—50–60%; Huebner—60–70%; Huebner—70–80%

Republican primary results
Party	Candidate	Votes	%
Republican	Adrian Smith (incumbent)	60,549	64.7
Republican	David Huebner	33,020	35.3
Total votes		93,569	100.0

=== Democratic primary ===
==== Candidates ====
===== Nominee =====
- Becky Stille, agriculture processing quality manager

==== Fundraising ====
Campaign finance reports as of December 31, 2025
Candidate	Raised	Spent	Cash on hand
Becky Stille (D)	$41,579	$28,790	$12,788
Source: Federal Election Commission

==== Results ====
Democratic primary results
Party	Candidate	Votes	%
Democratic	Becky Stille	18,113	100.0
Total votes		18,113	100.0

=== Legal Marijuana Now primary ===
==== Candidates ====
===== Nominee =====
- David Else, farmer, Democratic nominee for this district in 2022 and candidate in 2024

==== Results ====
Legal Marijuana Now primary results
Party	Candidate	Votes	%
Legal Marijuana Now	David Else	191	100.0
Total votes		191	100.0

=== Nebraska Working People Party ===
==== Candidates ====
===== Nominee =====
- Macey Budke, behavioral health practice manager (formerly ran as independent)

=== Independents ===
==== Candidates ====
===== Declared =====
- Mark Cohen, former U.S. Air Force attorney (Independent)

==== Fundraising ====
Campaign finance reports as of December 31, 2025
Candidate	Raised	Spent	Cash on hand
Mark Cohen (I)	$11,767	$14,330	$0
Source: Federal Election Commission

=== General election ===
==== Predictions ====
Source	Ranking	As of
Decision Desk HQ	Safe R	July 14, 2026
The Cook Political Report	Safe R	February 6, 2025
Inside Elections	Safe R	March 10, 2025
Sabato's Crystal Ball	Safe R	April 10, 2025

==== Fundraising ====
Campaign finance reports as of June 30, 2026
Candidate	Raised	Spent	Cash on hand
Adrian Smith (R)	$1,777,413	$1,682,292	$1,023,354
Becky Stille (D)	$55,101	$40,267	$14,833
David Else (LMN)	$0	$0	$0
Macey Budke (NWP)	$0	$0	$0
Mark Cohen (I)	$33,064	$30,616	$5,974
Source: Federal Election Commission

==== Results ====
2026 Nebraska's 3rd congressional district election
Party	Candidate	Votes	%	±%
Republican	Adrian Smith			
Democratic	Becky Stille			
Legal Marijuana Now	David Else			
Working People	Macey Budke			
Independent	Mark Cohen			
Total votes				

== Notes ==
Partisan clients
