= Chip Maxwell =

American politician

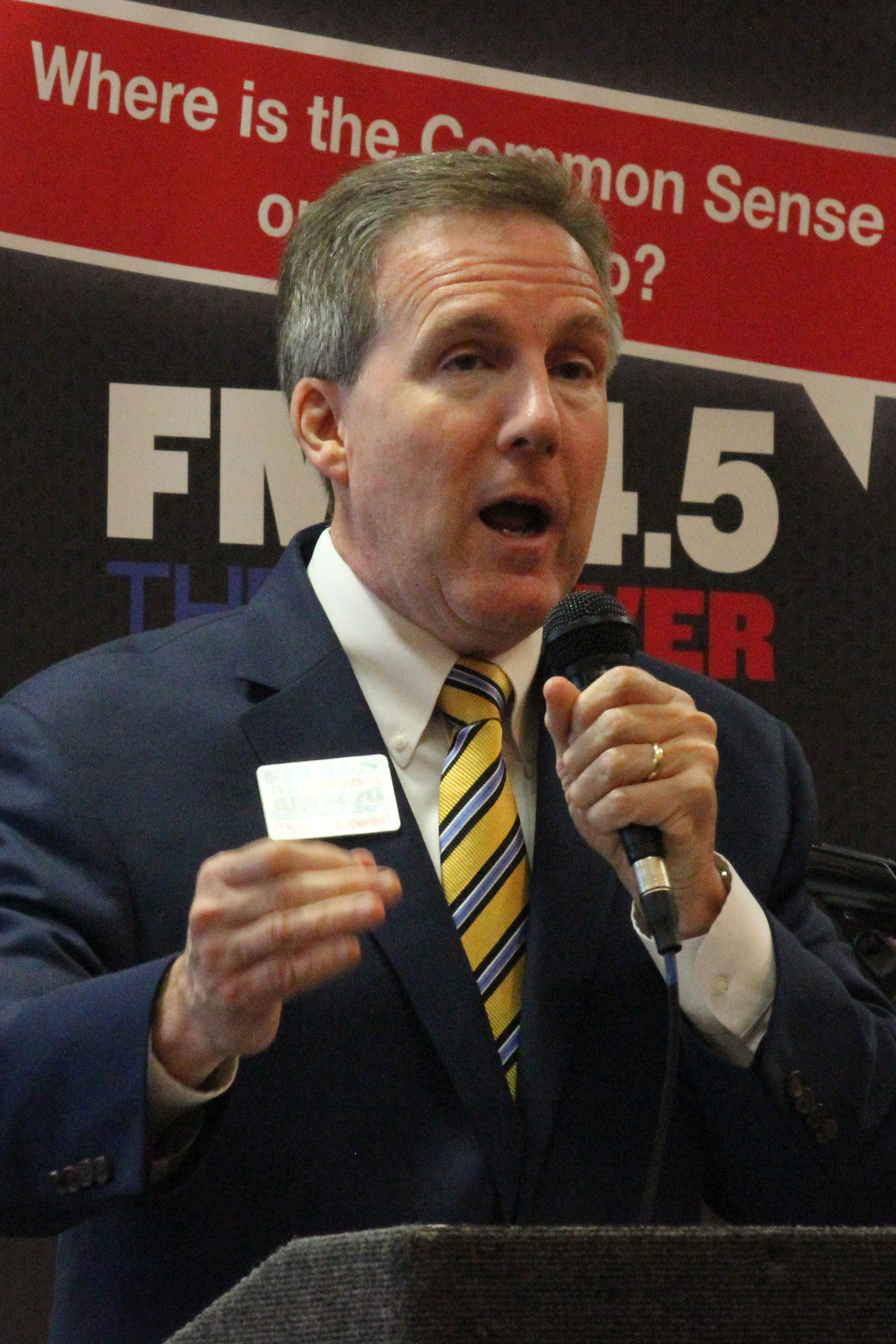
- Chip Maxwell in 2017

Member of the Douglas County Board of Commissioners from the 5th district
- In office January 3, 2005 – January 3, 2009
- Succeeded by: Marc Kraft

Member of the Nebraska Legislature from the 9th district
- In office January 3, 2001 – January 5, 2005
- Preceded by: Shelley Kiel
- Succeeded by: Gwen Howard

Personal details
- Born: August 10, 1962 (age 64) Omaha, Nebraska, U.S.
- Party: Republican (through 2013, 2016–present); Nonpartisan (2013–2016)
- Education: Boston College; University of Oxford; University of Nebraska–Lincoln.

Chip Maxwell (born August 10, 1962) is an American politician and conservative talk radio host from the state of Nebraska. A member of the Republican Party, Maxwell served in the unicameral Nebraska Legislature from 2001 to 2005 and on the Douglas County Board of Commissioners from 2005 to 2009. He stated that he would run in the Republican Party primary election for the U.S. House of Representatives in Nebraska's 2nd congressional district in the 2016 Election. Maxwell was defeated in the 2016 Republican primary by Don Bacon, 66%–34%, and in 2017 became the host of the "Omaha's Morning Answer" radio show on The Answer/KOTK.

== Career ==
Maxwell earned his BA in political science from Boston College, his MA in American history from the University of Oxford, and his JD from the University of Nebraska–Lincoln.

In 2000 when Democratic State Senator Shelley Kiel ran for Nebraska's 2nd congressional district in the United States House of Representatives, Maxwell ran to succeed her. In the technically nonpartisan race to succeed her, he defeated fellow Republican J. Scott Knudsen by 4,663 votes (54.83%) to 3,751 (44.11%). He declined to run for re-election in 2004, instead running for the District 5 seat on the Douglas County Board of Commissioners. He defeated Democrat John T. Green by 14,084 votes (52.67%) to 12,600 (47.12%). He was unseated by Democrat Marc Kraft, a former Omaha City Councillor by 13,882 votes (49.04%) to 11,925 (42.13%).

In 2009, Maxwell ran for the Omaha City Council, losing to Democrat Chris Jerram by 4,766 votes (52.39%) to 4,247 (46.69%).

He considered running in the Republican primary election for the House of Representatives in the 2nd Congressional district against incumbent Republican Lee Terry as a Tea Party challenger in the 2014 elections. After choosing not to run in the primary, he decided to run in the general election as an independent instead. He mounted an independent bid against Lee Terry and Brad Ashford.

Despite collecting enough signatures to make the ballot, Maxwell withdrew from the race on July 24, saying that he had been asked by high-profile Republicans not to run and didn't want to create a "permanent rift" in the district's Republican Party. However, he said that he planned to run against Terry in the Republican primary in 2016, and noted that "I think this thing's a toss-up, even with me out of it." Democratic nominee Brad Ashford defeated Terry in 2014, and Maxwell declared that he would run against Ashford in 2016.
