= Denise Powell =

American politician

- Powell in 2026

Member-elect of the U.S. House of Representatives from Nebraska's 2nd district
- Assuming office January 3, 2027
- Succeeding: Don Bacon

Personal details
- Born: Denise Blaya; May 31, 1978 (age 48) Florida, U.S.
- Party: Democratic
- Spouse: Hobson Powell
- Children: 2
- Education: University of Miami (BS)
- Website: Campaign website

Denise Blaya Powell (born May 31, 1978) is an American politician and political organizer from Nebraska. She was the Democratic Party nominee for Nebraska's 2nd congressional district in the 2026 election. She became the first Latina elected to Congress from Nebraska, and the first Democratic woman elected to the House from Nebraska.

== Political career ==
After attending the 2017 Women's March in Washington, D.C., Powell joined Leanne Prewitt in co-founding the political action committee Women Who Run Nebraska, aiming to train and advocate for women running for local office.

Powell speaks to supporters at a campaign event in South Omaha.

In May 2025, Powell launched her campaign for the United States House of Representatives representing Nebraska's 2nd congressional district. Including much of Omaha and the surrounding metropolitan area, the district has been held by Republican Congressman Don Bacon since 2017, although it was won by Democratic candidate Kamala Harris in the 2024 presidential election. Bacon announced his retirement on June 2025, leaving the seat open and creating a greater opportunity for Democrats.

Powell faced a number of candidates in the May 2026 primary, including state senator John Cavanaugh and Douglas County district court clerk Crystal Rhoades. Prior to election day on May 12, Nebraska Public Media found that the Democratic primary campaign attracted more than $5.6 million in outside spending, largely in support of Powell and opposing Cavanugh. Powell was declared the winner of the primary the next day, May 13, narrowly defeating Cavanaugh with 38.8% of the vote. She defeated Republican Brinker Harding, a member of the Omaha City Council, in the November general election. She became the first Latina elected to Congress from Nebraska, and the first Democratic woman elected to the House from Nebraska.

== Political positions ==
Powell has been described as a center-left moderate Democrat.

=== Economic policy ===
Powell has stated that she supports "Increase funding and support of small businesses across Nebraska" to help boost the economy.

=== Healthcare ===
Powell supports a public option in the United States. She stated on her campaign website that she will require Medicare to negotiate prices for insulin and prescription drug costs to $35 a month.

=== Social issues ===
Powell is pro-choice. She has stated that she supports the restoration of Roe v. Wade She supports the codifying of the right to contraception with the passing of the Right to Contraception Act. She also supports passing the Right to IVF Act to help expand insurance coverage for fertility treatments.

=== Foreign policy ===
Powell supports the reestablishment of USAID, among "other key U.S. programs." She supports the rebuilding of relations between America and its allies.

She has stated in reference to the Gaza war that "It has been heartbreaking to watch innocent lives destroyed because of this conflict" and has stated that Israeli Prime Minister Benjamin Netanyahu's government has "gone way too far." She supports a two-state solution.

=== Immigration ===
Powell supports providing the resources necessary to secure America's borders. She has also called for a pathway to citizenship for long term immigrants who have resided and worked in the U.S.

== Personal life ==
Powell currently resides in Omaha, Nebraska. She is married to Hobson Powell, and the couple has two children. She has previously lived in Miami, New York City, and Los Angeles. She attended Westminster Christian School in Palmetto Bay, Florida, and graduated from the University of Miami.

U.S. House of Representatives
Preceded by Don Bacon	Member of the U.S. House of Representatives from Nebraska's 2nd congressional district Taking office 2027	Elect
