= Shelley Kiel =

American politician

Member of the Nebraska Legislature from the 9th district
- In office January 8, 1997 – January 3, 2001
- Preceded by: John Lindsay
- Succeeded by: Chip Maxwell

Personal details
- Born: August 16, 1950 (age 75) Galesburg, Illinois
- Party: Democratic
- Spouse: Gary Kiel
- Children: 6 (Darin, Brian, Joseph, Samuel, Shaun, Raechel)
- Education: University of Nebraska–Lincoln (B.S.); University of Nebraska Omaha (M.S.)

Shelley Kiel (born August 16, 1950) is a Democratic politician from Nebraska who served as a member of the Nebraska Legislature from 1997 to 2001. In 2000, Kiel was the Democratic nominee for Congress in Nebraska's 2nd congressional district, but lost to Republican Congressman Lee Terry.

== Early career ==
Kiel was born in Galesburg, Illinois, and attended the University of Nebraska–Lincoln, graduating with her bachelor's degree in 1972. She later attended the University of Nebraska at Omaha, receiving her master's degree in 1972. She worked as a reading specialist at Creighton University.

In 1992, Kiel ran for the Metropolitan Community College Board of Governors from the 4th district, challenging incumbent Robert Hansen. Hansen placed first in the primary election, winning 55 percent of the vote to Kiel's 45 percent, and they advanced to the general election. Kiel argued that the college should allocate greater funding away from administration and part-time instructors and toward student services and full-time faculty members. In the general election, she narrowly defeated Hansen, winning 50.3 percent of the vote. While serving on the Board of Directors, Kiel was appointed to the Omaha Public Library Board in 1993.

== Nebraska Legislature ==
In 1996, State Senator John Lindsay declined to run for re-election, and Kiel ran to succeed him in the 9th district, which was based in downtown Omaha. Kiel ran in a crowded field of candidates, and narrowly placed first with 33 percent of the vote. She advanced to the general election against attorney Robert Sivick, who placed second with 31 percent of the vote, and was joined in the general election by businessman Klaus Becker, who petitioned his way onto the ballot. Though the race was nonpartisan, Kiel and Sivick were Democrats, and Becker was a Republican. Kiel won the general election by a wide margin, receiving 46 percent of the vote over Sivick and Becker, who each won 27 percent.

== 2000 congressional campaign ==
Kiel announced in 1999 that she would challenge Republican Congressman Lee Terry, who represented the state's Omaha-based 2nd district, in his bid for re-election in 2000. Kiel won the Democratic primary against attorney Allen Johnson in a landslide, and advanced to the general election against Terry.

Despite strong fundraising, Kiel lost to Terry in a landslide, winning just 31 percent of the vote to Terry's 66 percent.
