= Gwen Howard =

American politician (born 1945)

Member of the Nebraska Legislature from the 9th district
- In office 2005–2013
- Preceded by: Chip Maxwell
- Succeeded by: Sara Howard

Personal details
- Born: June 24, 1945 (age 81) Douglas County, Nebraska
- Education: University of Nebraska Omaha
- Occupation: Social worker

Gwen E. Howard (born 1945) is a politician from the U.S. state of Nebraska. She served two terms in the Nebraska Legislature, from 2005 to 2013, representing an Omaha district.

Howard was born Gwen E. Middaugh, on June 24, 1945, in Douglas County, Nebraska. She graduated from Omaha Benson High School in 1963. In 1967, she received a degree in sociology and psychology from Midland Lutheran College; in 1974, a master's degree in social work from the University of Nebraska Omaha. She married David Howard, who was killed in a car accident in 1981; and had two daughters, Carrie Howard and Sara Howard. She worked as a social worker and adoption specialist.

In 2004, Howard ran for the Nebraska Legislature from the 9th District, consisting of a portion of midtown Omaha. Incumbent Chip Maxwell, a member of the Republican Party, had decided to run for the Douglas County Board of Commissioners rather than seeking re-election. In the nonpartisan primary, Democrat Howard received 43% of the vote; Republican Scott Knudsen, a Republican mortgage banker who had unsuccessfully run for the seat in 2000, received 32%; and R. Anthony Metz received 25%. As the top two vote-getters, Howard and Knudsen moved on to the general election, in which Howard won the seat, with 56.7% of the vote to Knudsen's 43.3%.

In 2008, Howard ran unopposed for re-election to her seat in the Legislature.

During her legislative career, Howard served as vice-chairperson of the Education Committee and the Committee on Committees; she also sat on the Health and Human Services Committee and the Intergovernmental Cooperation Committee, and as one of Nebraska's seven commissioners in the interstate Education Commission of the States.

Nebraska's term-limits law left Howard ineligible to run for a third consecutive term in the Legislature in 2012. She ran for the 2nd District seat in the U.S. Congress, held by Republican Lee Terry. In the Democratic primary, she lost to Douglas County treasurer John Ewing, taking 38% of the vote to Ewing's 62%. Ewing lost the general election, with 49.2% of the vote to incumbent Terry's 50.8%. Meanwhile, Howard's daughter, Sara Howard, ran for the seat that Howard was vacating. Sara, a Democrat, came in first in the three-way nonpartisan primary, and defeated Republican Erica Fish in the general election.

In 2014, Howard was elected to an at-large seat on the Metropolitan Utilities District (MUD) board. MUD is a publicly owned utility that provides water and natural gas to the Omaha metropolitan area.
