= John Lindsay (Nebraska politician) =

American politician

Member of the Nebraska Legislature from the 9th district
- In office January 4, 1989 – January 8, 1997
- Preceded by: Marge Higgins
- Succeeded by: Shelley Kiel

Personal details
- Born: June 27, 1959 (age 67) Omaha, Nebraska
- Party: Democratic
- Spouse: Mary Beth Garbina (m. 1988)
- Children: 2 (John Jr., Patrick)
- Education: University of Nebraska–Lincoln; Creighton University (B.A., J.D.)
- Occupation: Attorney, lobbyist

John Lindsay (born June 27, 1959) is a Democratic politician, attorney, and lobbyist from Nebraska who served as a member of the Nebraska Legislature from the 9th district from 1989 to 1997.

== Early career ==
Lindsay was born in Omaha, Nebraska, and graduated from Creighton Preparatory School, later attending the University of Nebraska–Lincoln and graduating from Creighton University in 1981. He then attended the Creighton University School of Law, receiving his juris doctor in 1984. Following graduation, Lindsay clerked for Justice John T. Grant of the Supreme Court of Nebraska from 1984 to 1985. After clerking, he practiced as an attorney and taught business law as an adjunct instructor at Nebraska Wesleyan University.

== Nebraska Legislature ==
In 1988, Lindsay announced that he would challenge State Senator Marge Higgins for re-election. Higgins ultimately declined to seek re-election, however, and a crowded primary field developed. He faced Frances Mendenhall, a dentist; businessman Robert Anderson; Bill Cavanaugh, a member of the Metropolitan Utilities District board; James Fogaerty, a Union Pacific communications manager; and law student John Hilgert. Mendenhall placed first in the primary, receiving 29 percent of the vote to Lindsay's 22 percent, and they advanced to the general election. Lindsay narrowly defeated Mendenhall, winning 51–49 percent, and by just 135 votes.

Lindsay ran for re-election in 1992, and was challenged by William J. Beatty Brown, a death penalty advocate. He placed first in the primary election by a wide margin, winning 79 percent of the vote to Brown's 20 percent. In the general election, Lindsay won re-election in a landslide, defeating Brown, 77–23 percent.

In 1994, Lindsay challenged Commissioner Mike Albert, a member of the Douglas County Board and a fellow Democrat, for re-election. Albert declined to seek re-election, and he won the nomination unopposed, and faced Republican George Mills in the general election. Mills narrowly defeated Lindsay, flipping control of the County Board to a Republican majority.

Lindsay declined to seek a third term in 1996.

== Post-legislative career ==
Following the end of his term in the legislature, Lindsay returned to the practice of law and opened a lobbying firm shortly thereafter with Paul O'Hara. Following a 2020 spinal surgery, he suffered a severe infection and was unable to use his arms or legs for several years before eventually regaining movement.
