= John Cavanaugh (politician) =

American politician (born 1980)

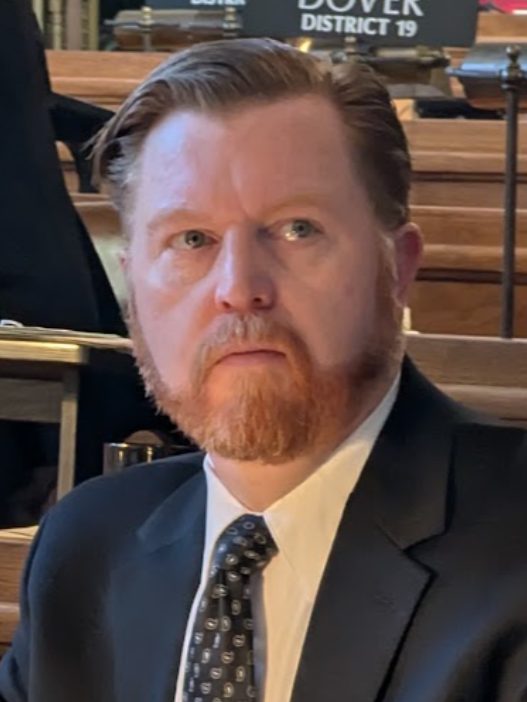
- Cavanaugh in 2025

Member of the Nebraska Legislature from the 9th district
- Incumbent
- Assumed office January 6, 2021
- Preceded by: Sara Howard

Personal details
- Born: October 6, 1980 (age 46) Omaha, Nebraska, U.S.
- Party: Democratic
- Spouse: Kathleen McGill
- Children: 4
- Relatives: John J. Cavanaugh III (father); Machaela Cavanaugh (sister)
- Education: Catholic University (BA); Vermont Law School (MA, JD)

John Joseph Cavanaugh Jr. (born October 6, 1980) is an American attorney and politician serving as a member of the Nebraska Legislature from the 9th district. Elected in November 2020, he assumed office on January 2021, and was re-elected in 2024.

He ran for Nebraska's 2nd congressional district in the 2026 election. He lost in the primary election to Denise Powell.

== Early career ==
Cavanaugh was an intern in both chambers of the United States Congress. From 2006 to 2008, he worked in quality assurance for FirstComp Insurance. He also worked as an attorney and assistant public defender.

== Nebraska State Legislature ==
In the 2020 election, Cavanaugh ran for District 9 of Nebraska's Legislative District which covers a portion of Omaha, Nebraska, in Douglas County. He was elected to the Nebraska Legislature in November 2020 and assumed office on January 6, 2021.

As of 2025, Cavanaugh serves as the Vice Chairperson on the General Affairs Committee, and a member on the Government, Military and Veterans Affairs and Urban Affairs Committee. He is also a member of the Committee On Committees, Midwestern Higher Education Compact Commission, and Justice Reinvestment Oversight (LB605).

== U.S. House campaign ==
=== 2026 ===
On June 4, 2025, Cavanaugh announced his campaign for Nebraska's 2nd congressional district, his father's old congressional seat and a district Kamala Harris carried in the 2024 presidential election. In a primary contest littered with spoiler candidates, viable contender Denise Powell edged out the Democratic victory.

== Personal life ==
Cavanaugh was born in Omaha, Nebraska. He is one of eight siblings. His father, John J. Cavanaugh III, was also a member of the Nebraska Legislature and represented Nebraska's 2nd congressional district in the United States House of Representatives from 1977 to 1981. His sister, Machaela Cavanaugh, is also a member of the Nebraska Legislature. Cavanaugh graduated from Creighton Preparatory School in 1999. He earned a Bachelor of Arts degree from the Catholic University of America in 2003, followed by a Master of Arts in environmental policy and a Juris Doctor from the Vermont Law School.

Cavanaugh is married and has four children.
