= John J. Cavanaugh III =

American politician

John Cavanaugh
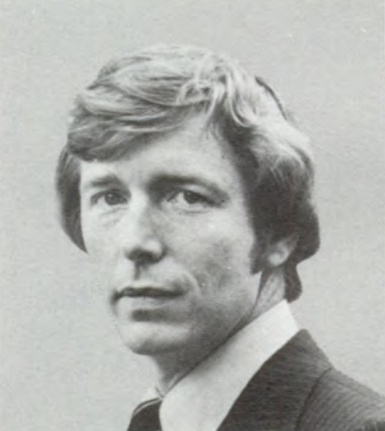

Member of the U.S. House of Representatives from Nebraska's 2nd district
- In office January 3, 1977 – January 3, 1981
- Preceded by: John Y. McCollister
- Succeeded by: Hal Daub

Member of the Nebraska Legislature from the 9th district
- In office January 2, 1973 – January 5, 1977
- Preceded by: Sam Klaver
- Succeeded by: Bill Brennan

Personal details
- Born: John Joseph Cavanaugh III; August 1, 1945 (age 81) Omaha, Nebraska, U.S.
- Party: Democratic
- Children: 8, including John and Machaela
- Education: Regis University (BA); Creighton University (JD)

Military service
- Allegiance: United States
- Branch/service: United States Army
- Years of service: 1968–1970

John Joseph Cavanaugh III (born August 1, 1945) is an American politician and lawyer from Nebraska. First elected to the Nebraska Legislature from 1977 until 1981, he served in the United States House of Representatives from Nebraska’s 2nd congressional district. Since the death of Brad Ashford in 2022, Cavanaugh is the only living Democrat in the state to have been elected to the House of Representatives.

== Early life and education ==
Born in Omaha, Nebraska, he graduated from Creighton Preparatory School in 1963, from Regis College in Denver, Colorado , in 1967 and from Creighton University School of Law in 1972. From 1968 to 1970, Cavanaugh served in the United States Army. He was admitted to the bar in 1972 and set up practice in Omaha.

== Career ==
In 1972, he was elected to the Nebraska Legislature from the ninth district. He served until his 1976 election to the United States House of Representatives, where he represented Nebraska's 2nd congressional district in the Ninety-fifth United States Congress. He was reelected to the Ninety-sixth United States Congress in 1978. In total, Cavanaugh served in Congress from January 3, 1977, to January 3, 1981. He chose not to seek reelection in 1980 and instead returned to practising law in Omaha. He was succeeded by Republican Hal Daub, whom he had defeated in 1978.

Cavanaugh was a delegate for Nebraska to the Democratic National Convention of 1980, 2000, and 2004.

Cavanaugh is a member of the ReFormers Caucus of Issue One.

== Personal life ==
Cavanaugh is Catholic and has eight children, including John Jr. and Machaela, who are both members of the Nebraska Legislature. In June 2025, John Jr. announced a campaign for his father's old congressional seat in the 2026 election, currently held by Republican Don Bacon.

== Bibliography ==
- John J. Cavanaugh, III - Martindale-Hubbell Law Profile

U.S. House of Representatives
Preceded by John Y. McCollister	Member of the U.S. House of Representatives from Nebraska's 2nd congressional district 1977–1981	Succeeded by Hal Daub
U.S. order of precedence (ceremonial)
Preceded by Jake LaTurner as Former U.S. Representative	Order of precedence of the United States as Former U.S. Representative	Succeeded by Jon L. Christensen as Former U.S. Representative
