= Bill Brennan (Nebraska politician) =

American politician (1922–1979)

Member of the Nebraska Legislature from the 9th district
- In office January 5, 1977 – August 7, 1979
- Preceded by: John Cavanaugh
- Succeeded by: Ray Powers

Personal details
- Born: March 5, 1922 Omaha, Nebraska
- Died: August 7, 1979 (aged 57) Omaha, Nebraska
- Party: Democratic
- Spouse: Marilyn Brogan (m. 1949)
- Children: 8 (Patrick, Kathleen, Mary Clare, Susan, Dennis, Theresa, Kevin, Mary Frances)
- Education: Centre College, Creighton University

William E. "Bill" Brennan (March 5, 1922 – August 7, 1979) was a Democratic politician from Nebraska who served as a member of the Nebraska Legislature from the 9th district from 1977 until his death in 1979.

== Early career ==
Brennan was born in Omaha, Nebraska, and graduated from Omaha South High School in 1940. He later attended Centre College and Creighton University, and served in the U.S. Air Force during World War II. He worked as an elevator construction worker, and joined the International Union of Elevator Constructors in 1948, and was elected president of the Nebraska AFL-CIO in 1972. He was re-elected in 1977 after his election to the legislature.

== Nebraska Legislature ==
In 1976, State Senator John Cavanaugh opted to run for Congress rather than seek re-election. Brennan ran to succeed him in the 9th district. He faced a crowded primary, and ultimately placed first, receiving 30 percent of the vote to insurance agent Sam Howell's 30 percent and teachers' union executive Pat Shafer's 25 percent. Brennan and Howell advanced to the general election. Brennan defeated Howell, winning 55–45 percent.

== Death ==
Brennan died on August 7, 1979, several weeks after emergency surgery for an aneurysm.
