= Sara Howard (politician) =

American politician (born 1981)

Member of the Nebraska Legislature from the 9th district
- In office January 9, 2013 – January 6, 2021
- Preceded by: Gwen Howard
- Succeeded by: John Cavanaugh

Personal details
- Born: September 24, 1981 (age 45) Omaha, Nebraska
- Party: Democratic
- Education: Smith College (BA); Loyola University (JD)
- Occupation: Attorney
- Website: Sara for Nebraska

Sara Howard (born September 24, 1981) is a politician from the U.S. state of Nebraska. In 2012, she was elected to the Nebraska Legislature, representing an Omaha district.

Howard was born in Omaha in 1981, the daughter of Gwen Howard and David Howard; her father was killed in a car accident before her birth. She graduated from Omaha's Duchesne Academy of the Sacred Heart in 1999. In 2003, she received a B.A. from Smith College; in 2008, a J.D. from Loyola University Chicago School of Law. From 2009 to 2011, she worked as a staff attorney for the Illinois Maternal and Child Health Coalition, then moved to Omaha, where she worked as a development specialist for OneWorld Community Health Centers.

Gwen Howard served two terms in the Nebraska Legislature, representing the 9th District in midtown Omaha. Because of Nebraska's term-limits law, she was ineligible to run for a third consecutive term in the 2012 election. Sara Howard, who had been her mother's campaign manager, ran for the seat. In the nonpartisan primary, Howard received 56.6% of the vote; Erica Fish, 30.1%; and Vernon Joseph Davis, 13.3%. As the top two vote-getters, Howard, a member of the Democratic Party, and Fish, a Republican, moved on to the general election. Howard won the seat, with 66% of the vote to Fish's 34%.

In the Legislature's 2015 session, Howard was appointed to the Banking, Commerce, and Insurance Committee, and to the Health and Human Services Committee.
