= 2006 United States House of Representatives elections in Nebraska =

- November 4, 2006

All 3 Nebraska seats to the United States House of Representatives
	Majority party	Minority party
Party	Republican	Democratic
Last election	3	0
Seats won	3	0
Seat change	Steady	Steady
Popular vote	334,177	261,910
Percentage	56.06%	43.94%
Swing	▼11.16%	▲13.72%

Republican
50–60%
60–70%
70–80%
Democratic
50–60%
60–70%

The 2006 United States House of Representatives elections in Nebraska were held on November 4, 2006 to determine who will represent the state of Nebraska in the United States House of Representatives. Nebraska has three seats in the House, apportioned according to the 2000 United States census. Representatives are elected for two-year terms.

== Overview ==
United States House of Representatives elections in Nebraska, 2006
Party	Votes	Percentage	Seats	+/–
Republican	334,177	56.06%	3	—
Democratic	261,910	43.94%	0	—
Totals	596,087	100.00%	3	—

== District 1 ==
2006 Nebraska's 1st congressional district election
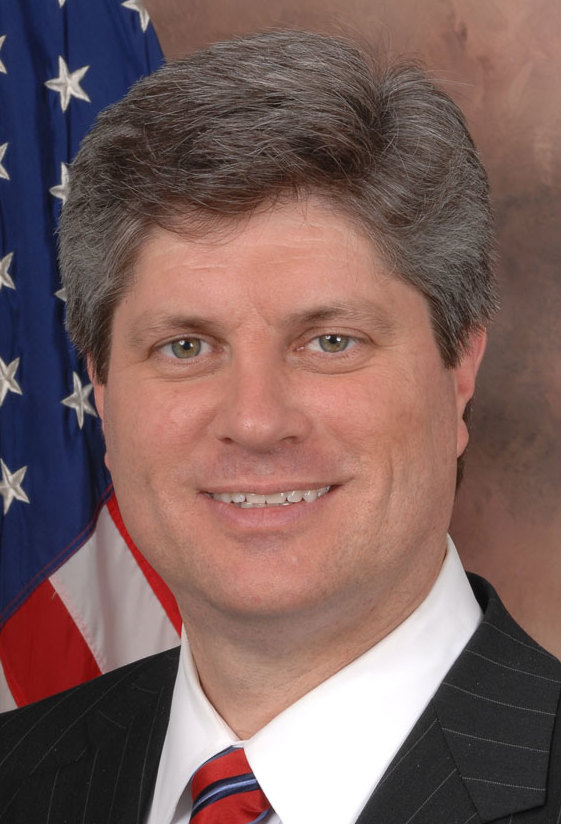

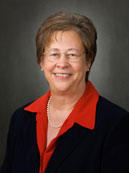
Nominee	Jeff Fortenberry	Maxine Moul
Party	Republican	Democratic
Popular vote	121,015	86,360
Percentage	58.36%	41.64%
- Fortenberry: 50–60% 60–70% 70–80% 80–90% Moul: 50–60% 60–70% 70–80% No votes
U.S. Representative before election
Jeff Fortenberry
Republican
Elected U.S. Representative
Jeff Fortenberry
Republican

Incumbent Republican Congressman Jeff Fortenberry, who was first elected in 2004, ran for re-election to a second term. He was challenged in the general election by former Lieutenant Governor Maxine Moul, the Democratic nominee. Fortenberry defeated Moul by a wide margin, winning his second term with 58% of the vote.

=== Republican primary ===
==== Candidates ====
- Jeff Fortenberry, incumbent Congressman

==== Results ====
Republican primary results
Party	Candidate	Votes	%
Republican	Jeff Fortenberry (inc.)	81,188	100.00%
Total votes		81,188	100.00%

=== Democratic primary ===
==== Candidates ====
- Maxine Moul, former Lieutenant Governor
- James Wilson, former sportscaster

==== Results ====
Democratic primary results
Party	Candidate	Votes	%
Democratic	Maxine B. Moul	23,338	71.10%
Democratic	James Wilson	9,528	28.90%
Total votes		32,866	100.00%

=== General election ===
==== Predictions ====
Source	Ranking	As of
The Cook Political Report	Safe R	November 6, 2006
Rothenberg	Safe R	November 6, 2006
Sabato's Crystal Ball	Safe R	November 6, 2006
Real Clear Politics	Safe R	November 7, 2006
CQ Politics	Lean R	November 7, 2006

==== Results ====
2006 Nebraska's 1st congressional district general election results
Party	Candidate	Votes	%
Republican	Jeff Fortenberry (inc.)	121,015	58.40%
Democratic	Maxine B. Moul	86,360	41.60%
Total votes		207,375	100.00%
Republican hold			

== District 2 ==
2006 Nebraska's 2nd congressional district election
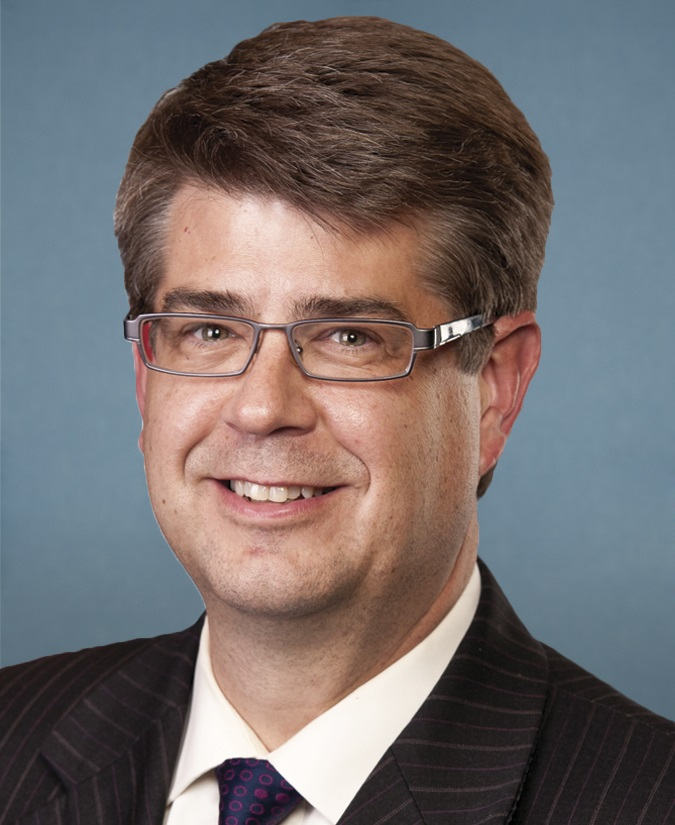

Nominee	Lee Terry	Jim Esch
Party	Republican	Democratic
Popular vote	99,475	82,504
Percentage	54.66%	45.34%
- Precinct results Terry: 50–60% 60–70% 70–80% Esch: 50–60% 60–70% 70–80% 80–90% No votes
U.S. Representative before election
Lee Terry
Republican
Elected U.S. Representative
Lee Terry
Republican

Incumbent Republican Congressman Lee Terry ran for re-election to a fifth term. He faced attorney Jim Esch, the Democratic nominee. Esch ran a stronger campaign against Terry than many of his past opponents, but Terry ultimately won re-election with 55% of the vote.

=== Republican primary ===
==== Candidates ====
- Lee Terry, incumbent Congressman
- Steven Laird, 1998 Republican candidate for Congress

==== Results ====
Republican primary results
Party	Candidate	Votes	%
Republican	Lee Terry (inc.)	52,890	83.97%
Republican	Steven Laird	10,380	16.03%
Total votes		63,270	100.00%

=== Democratic primary ===
==== Candidates ====
- Jim Esch, attorney

==== Results ====
Democratic primary results
Party	Candidate	Votes	%
Democratic	Jim Esch	21,352	100.00%
Total votes		21,352	100.00%

=== General election ===
==== Predictions ====
Source	Ranking	As of
The Cook Political Report	Safe R	November 6, 2006
Rothenberg	Safe R	November 6, 2006
Sabato's Crystal Ball	Safe R	November 6, 2006
Real Clear Politics	Safe R	November 7, 2006
CQ Politics	Safe R	November 7, 2006

==== Results ====
2006 Nebraska's 2nd congressional district general election results
Party	Candidate	Votes	%
Republican	Lee Terry (inc.)	99,475	54.70%
Democratic	Jim Esch	82,504	45.30%
Total votes		181,979	100.00%
Republican hold			

== District 3 ==
2006 Nebraska's 3rd congressional district election
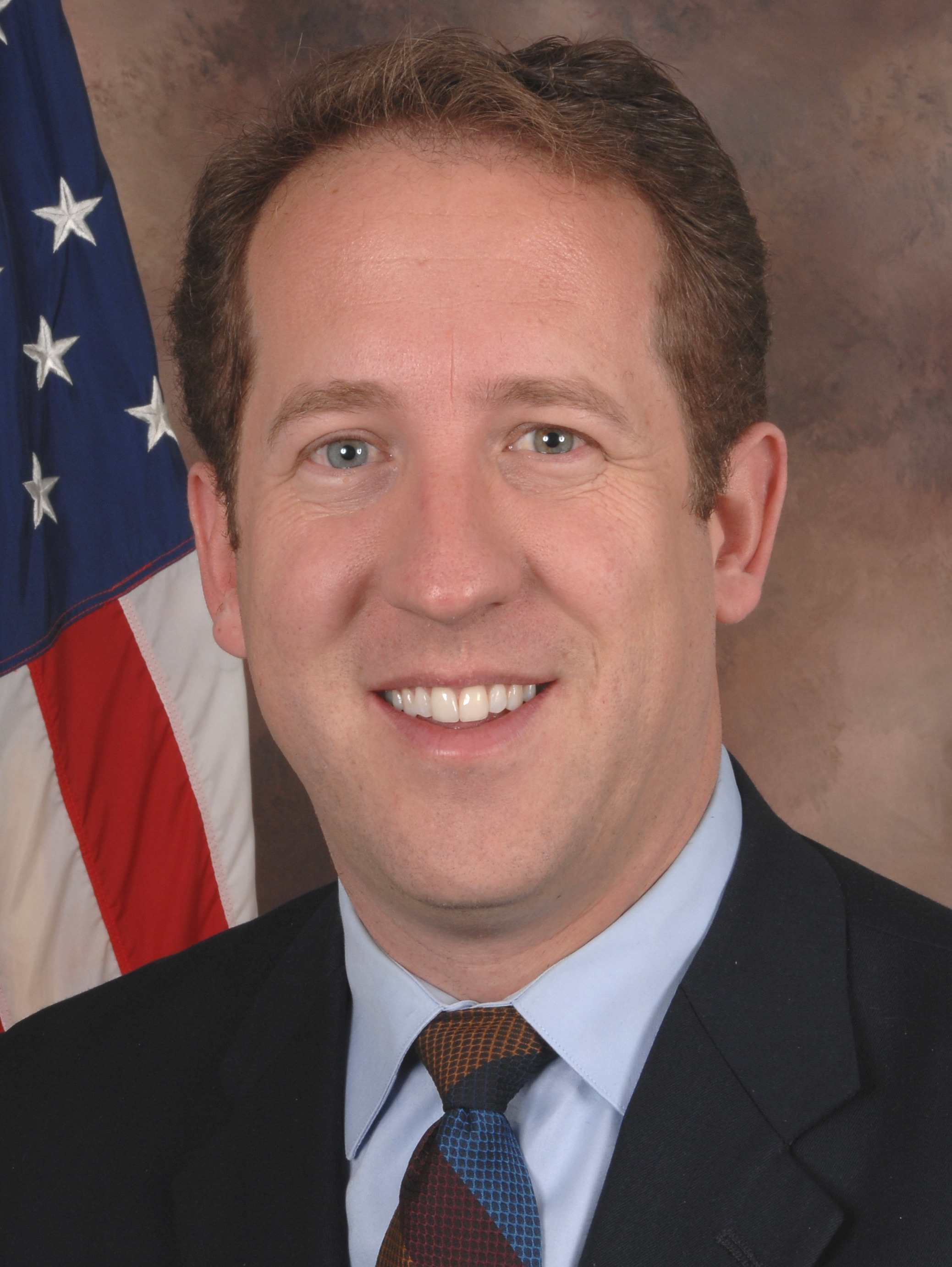

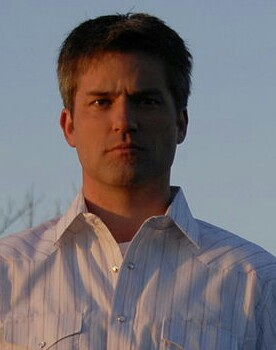
Nominee	Adrian Smith	Scott Kleeb
Party	Republican	Democratic
Popular vote	113,687	93,046
Percentage	54.99%	45.01%
- Smith: 50–60% 60–70% 70–80% 80–90% Kleeb: 50–60% 60–70% 70–80% Tie: 50% No Data
U.S. Representative before election
Tom Osborne
Republican
Elected U.S. Representative
Adrian Smith
Republican

Incumbent Republican Congressman Tom Osborne opted to run for Governor rather than seek re-election. State Senator Adrian Smith won the Republican primary to succeed Osborne, and faced farmer Scott Kleeb in the general election. Even though the 3rd district typically voted for Republican candidates in landslide margins, the race narrowed, and Smith defeated Kleeb with just 55% of the vote.

=== Republican primary ===
==== Candidates ====
- Adrian Smith, State Senator
- John Hanson, former district director for Congressman Tom Osborne
- Jay Vavricek, Mayor of Grand Island
- David Harris, national security analyst
- Douglas Polk, Kearney social studies teacher

==== Campaign ====
State Senator Adrian Smith, former Osborne aide John Hanson, and Grand Island Mayor Jay Vavricek emerged as the leading Republican candidates to succeed Osborne. During the campaign, Smith received significant financial support from the Club for Growth, which his primary rivals criticized, pointing to the group's opposition to farm subsidies. Smith ultimately won the primary with just 39% of the vote, and advanced to the general election.

==== Results ====
Republican primary results
Party	Candidate	Votes	%
Republican	Adrian Smith	42,218	39.48%
Republican	John Hanson	30,501	28.54%
Republican	Jay Vavricek	29,224	27.35%
Republican	David Harris	2,934	2.75%
Republican	Douglas Polk	2,020	1.89%
Total votes		106,897	100.00%

=== Democratic primary ===
==== Candidates ====
- Scott Kleeb, farmer

==== Results ====
Democratic primary results
Party	Candidate	Votes	%
Democratic	Scott Kleeb	23,929	100.00%
Total votes		23,929	100.00%

=== General election ===
==== Campaign ====
Despite the conservative nature of the 3rd district, which historically supported Republican candidates by wide margins, Smith entered the general election following a difficult primary election, and Kleeb ran a strong campaign. As Democrats performed well nationwide, both political parties unexpectedly focused attention on the race. President George W. Bush held a campaign rally for Smith in Grand Island, urging voters to support Smith and other Republican candidates on the ballot.

Toward the end of the campaign, a series of automated telephone calls purporting to be from the Kleeb campaign were placed to voters, using Kleeb's voice and taking place in the middle of the night. Following the campaign, several Democratic leaders in the district filed complaints with the Nebraska Public Service Commission, and the state legislature considered legislation that would limit the number of automated calls that campaigns could place. Ultimately, the Commission's investigation concluded without any action, and Governor Dave Heineman vetoed the proposed legislation.

=== Endorsements ===
Scott Kleeb (D)

Individuals

- Wesley Clark, General, 2004 Democratic presidential candidate

==== Predictions ====
Source	Ranking	As of
The Cook Political Report	Lean R	November 6, 2006
Rothenberg	Likely R	November 6, 2006
Sabato's Crystal Ball	Tilt R	November 6, 2006
Real Clear Politics	Safe R	November 7, 2006
CQ Politics	Lean R	November 7, 2006

=== Results ===
2006 Nebraska's 3rd congressional district general election results
Party	Candidate	Votes	%
Republican	Adrian Smith	113,687	54.99%
Democratic	Scott Kleeb	93,046	45.00%
Total votes		206,733	100.00%
Republican hold			
