= Ray Powers =

American politician (1924–2011)

Member of the Nebraska Legislature from the 9th district
- In office August 31, 1979 – November 30, 1980
- Preceded by: Bill Brennan
- Succeeded by: Marge Higgins

Personal details
- Born: February 21, 1924 Omaha, Nebraska
- Died: December 25, 2011 (aged 87) Papillion, Nebraska
- Party: Democratic
- Spouse: Florence Boyd (m. 1946)
- Children: 9
- Education: Creighton University; Van Sant Business College
- Occupation: Department store executive

Raphael P. "Ray" Powers (February 21, 1924 – December 25, 2011) was a Democratic politician from Nebraska who served as a member of the Nebraska Legislature from the 9th district from 1979 to 1980.

== Early life ==
Powers was born in 1924 in Omaha, Nebraska. He graduated from the Creighton Preparatory School and later attended Creighton University and the Van Sant Business School. Powers worked for J. L. Brandeis and Sons from 1947 to 1978, ultimately becoming the company's vice president of operations.

In 1968, Powers ran for the Omaha Board of Education, seeking one of six at-large seats. He campaigned on hiring teacher assistants to help "motivate" students, but ultimately lost, placing eleventh out of twelve candidates.

== Nebraska Legislature ==
In 1979, following the death of State Senator Bill Brennan, Governor Charles Thone appointed Powers to serve out the remainder of Brennan's term. He was sworn in on August 31, 1979.

Powers ran for election to a full term in 1980, and was challenged by three opponents: Marge Higgins, an insurance agency manager; John Cronin, a contractor; and Randy Stevenson, a student at the University of Nebraska Omaha. Powers placed first in the primary, receiving 43 percent of the vote to Higgins's 38 percent, and they advanced to the general election. Higgins narrowly defeated Powers, winning 51 percent of the vote to his 49 percent.

== Post-legislative career ==
Powers resigned from the legislature on November 30, 1980, following his appointment as the lobbyist for the city of Omaha, which allowed Higgins to be sworn in a month early. He subsequently worked in real estate and as the general manager for the agricultural air purification division of a construction company.

== Death ==
Powers died on December 25, 2011.
