= 2008 United States Senate election in Nebraska =

- November 4, 2008
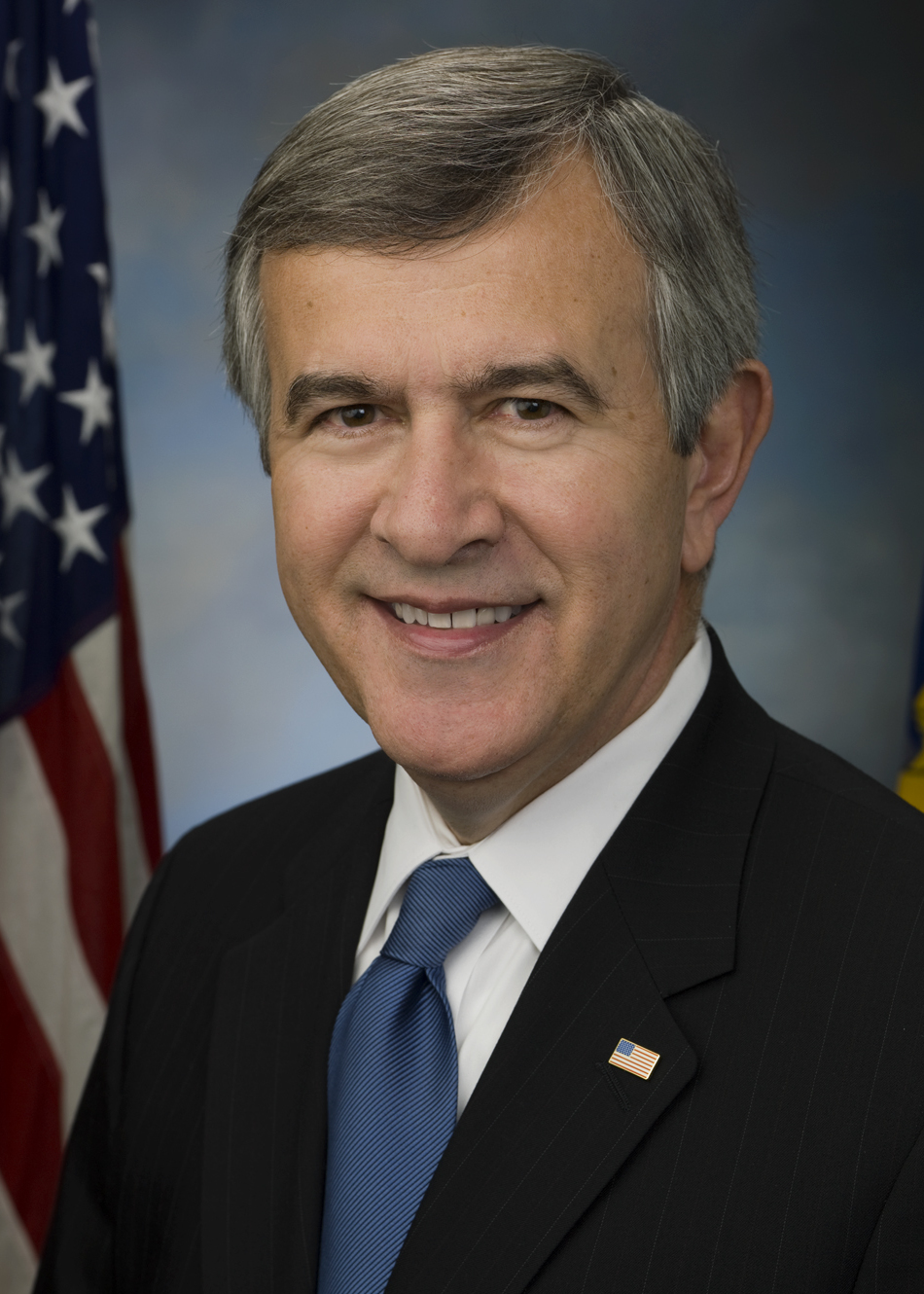

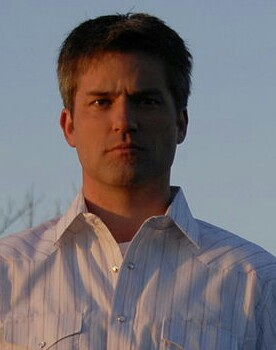
Nominee	Mike Johanns	Scott Kleeb
Party	Republican	Democratic
Popular vote	455,854	317,456
Percentage	57.52%	40.06%
- Johanns: 40–50% 50–60% 60–70% 70–80% 80–90% >90% Kleeb: 40–50% 50–60% 60–70% 70–80% 80–90% >90% Tie: 40–50% 50% No votes
U.S. senator before election
Chuck Hagel
Republican
Elected U.S. Senator
Mike Johanns
Republican

The 2008 United States Senate election in Nebraska was held on November 4, 2008. Incumbent Republican Senator Chuck Hagel declined to seek a third term. Mike Johanns, the former Governor of Nebraska and United States Secretary of Agriculture, won the Republican primary to succeed him. He faced Scott Kleeb, the 2006 Democratic nominee for Nebraska's 3rd congressional district, in the general election and defeated him in a landslide, winning 58% of the vote.

== Republican primary ==
=== Candidates ===
- Pat Flynn, businessman
- Mike Johanns, former United States Secretary of Agriculture and former Governor of Nebraska

==== Withdrew ====
- Jon Bruning, Attorney General of Nebraska
- Hal Daub, former mayor of Omaha and former United States congressman

=== Results ===
Republican primary results
Party	Candidate	Votes	%
Republican	Mike Johanns	112,191	78.61%
Republican	Pat Flynn	31,560	21.12%
Total votes		143,751	100.00%

== Democratic primary ==
=== Candidates ===
- Scott Kleeb, businessman and 2006 Democratic nominee for Nebraska's 3rd congressional district
- Tony Raimondo, Columbus businessman
- Larry Marvin, United States Air Force veteran and 1998 state legislative candidate
- James Bryan Wilson, 2007 write-in candidate for Mayor of Lincoln

==== Declined ====
- Bob Kerrey, former U.S. Senator (1989–2001)

=== Results ===
Democratic primary results
Party	Candidate	Votes	%
Democratic	Scott Kleeb	65,582	68.37%
Democratic	Tony Raimondo	24,141	25.17%
Democratic	James Bryan Wilson	3,224	3.36%
Democratic	Larry Marvin	2,672	2.80%
Total votes		95,919	100.00%

== Green primary ==
=== Candidates ===
- Steve Larrick

=== Results ===
Green Party primary results
Party	Candidate	Votes	%
Green	Steve Larrick	123	100.00%
Total votes		123	100.00%

== Nebraska primary ==
=== Candidates ===
- Kelly Rosberg

=== Results ===
Nebraska Party primary results
Party	Candidate	Votes	%
Nebraska	Kelly Rosberg	209	100.00%
Total votes		209	100.00%

== General election ==
=== Predictions ===
Source	Ranking	As of
The Cook Political Report	Likely R	October 23, 2008
CQ Politics	Likely R	October 31, 2008
Rothenberg Political Report	Safe R	November 2, 2008
Real Clear Politics	Likely R	September 30, 2008

=== Polling ===
Poll Source	Dates administered	Kleeb	Johanns
Research 2000/Daily Kos	November 12–14, 2007	28%	59%
Rasmussen Reports	May 15, 2008	40%	55%
Research 2000/Daily Kos	May 19–21, 2008	31%	58%
Rasmussen Reports	June 23, 2008	33%	60%
Rasmussen Reports	July 28, 2008	34%	60%
Rasmussen Reports	September 30, 2008	38%	52%

=== Results ===
2008 United States Senate election in Nebraska
Party	Candidate	Votes	%	±%
Republican	Mike Johanns	455,854	57.52%	−25.24%
Democratic	Scott Kleeb	317,456	40.06%	+25.42%
Nebraska	Kelly Rosberg	11,438	1.44%	—
Green	Steve Larrick	7,763	0.98%	—
Majority		138,398	17.46%	−50.67%
Total votes		792,511	100.00%	
Republican hold				

==== By county ====
From Secretary of State of Nebraska

County	Mike Johanns Republican		Scott Kleeb Democratic		Kelly Renee Rosberg Nebraska		Steve Larrick Green		Total votes
County	%	#	%	#	%	#	%	#	Total votes
Adams	47.59%	6,263	50.65%	6,665	1.09%	143	0.68%	89	13,160
Antelope	66.76%	2,123	30.91%	983	1.57%	50	0.75%	24	3,180
Arthur	72.80%	182	24.40%	61	2.80%	7	0.00%	0	250
Banner	73.96%	301	24.57%	100	1.23%	5	0.25%	1	407
Blaine	59.68%	188	37.78%	119	1.90%	6	0.63%	2	315
Boone	60.11%	1,706	38.23%	1,085	1.34%	38	0.32%	9	2,838
Box Butte	60.42%	2,966	36.20%	1,777	2.30%	113	1.08%	53	4,909
Boyd	59.41%	641	37.91%	409	2.22%	24	0.46%	5	1,079
Brown	65.03%	1,006	31.42%	486	2.97%	46	0.58%	9	1,547
Buffalo	61.86%	11,876	36.46%	7,000	1.10%	212	0.57%	110	19,198
Burt	60.61%	2,023	36.97%	1,234	1.77%	59	0.66%	22	3,338
Butler	60.88%	2,336	37.74%	1,448	1.09%	42	0.29%	11	3,837
Cass	62.07%	7,412	35.25%	4,210	1.95%	233	0.73%	87	11,942
Cedar	70.75%	2,907	26.33%	1,082	2.41%	99	0.51%	21	4,109
Chase	72.07%	1,308	26.28%	477	1.21%	22	0.44%	8	1,815
Cherry	70.19%	2,093	25.99%	775	3.29%	98	0.54%	16	2,982
Cheyenne	75.04%	3,583	21.78%	1,040	2.53%	121	0.65%	31	4,775
Clay	58.30%	1,770	39.86%	1,210	1.35%	41	0.49%	15	3,036
Colfax	64.16%	2,057	33.37%	1,070	1.87%	60	0.59%	19	3,206
Cuming	69.70%	2,830	28.82%	1,170	1.21%	49	0.27%	11	4,060
Custer	60.07%	3,373	38.70%	2,173	0.89%	50	0.34%	19	5,615
Dakota	56.58%	3,543	39.78%	2,491	3.31%	207	0.34%	21	6,262
Dawes	63.59%	2,363	31.57%	1,173	3.71%	138	1.13%	42	3,716
Dawson	60.15%	4,801	37.91%	3,026	1.48%	118	0.46%	37	7,982
Deuel	72.52%	710	22.27%	218	4.60%	45	0.61%	6	979
Dixon	67.76%	1,877	29.28%	811	2.53%	70	0.43%	12	2,770
Dodge	60.89%	9,374	36.68%	5,647	1.83%	282	0.60%	93	15,396
Douglas	55.29%	123,299	42.00%	93,667	1.38%	3,070	1.34%	2,982	223,018
Dundy	69.90%	699	25.80%	258	3.60%	36	0.70%	7	1,000
Fillmore	54.34%	1,610	44.38%	1,315	1.01%	30	0.27%	8	2,963
Franklin	47.48%	734	51.03%	789	0.84%	13	0.65%	10	1,546
Frontier	62.76%	873	35.30%	491	1.44%	20	0.50%	7	1,391
Furnas	61.50%	1,436	36.83%	860	1.28%	30	0.39%	9	2,335
Gage	48.26%	4,909	49.93%	5,079	1.26%	128	0.55%	56	10,172
Garden	74.73%	831	22.30%	248	2.43%	27	0.54%	6	1,112
Garfield	55.11%	566	43.33%	445	1.46%	15	0.10%	1	1,027
Gosper	60.99%	641	37.49%	394	1.43%	15	0.10%	1	1,051
Grant	71.39%	257	25.28%	91	3.06%	11	0.28%	1	360
Greeley	43.28%	522	55.22%	666	1.41%	17	0.08%	1	1,206
Hall	53.80%	11,398	44.46%	9,419	1.14%	241	0.61%	129	21,187
Hamilton	60.79%	2,905	38.17%	1,824	0.71%	34	0.33%	16	4,779
Harlan	57.18%	1,007	41.11%	724	1.53%	27	0.17%	3	1,761
Hayes	64.07%	353	33.03%	182	2.18%	12	0.73%	4	551
Hitchcock	60.57%	825	36.86%	502	1.84%	25	0.73%	10	1,362
Holt	66.08%	3,271	31.72%	1,570	1.68%	83	0.53%	26	4,950
Hooker	67.98%	293	30.16%	130	1.86%	8	0.00%	0	431
Howard	50.82%	1,523	47.35%	1,419	1.33%	40	0.50%	15	2,997
Jefferson	52.33%	1,935	45.81%	1,694	1.16%	43	0.70%	26	3,698
Johnson	49.98%	1,055	48.03%	1,014	1.47%	31	0.52%	11	2,111
Kearney	59.96%	1,888	38.68%	1,218	1.05%	33	0.32%	10	3,149
Keith	70.09%	2,763	27.52%	1,085	1.90%	75	0.48%	19	3,942
Keya Paha	63.01%	327	34.68%	180	1.54%	8	0.77%	4	519
Kimball	70.19%	1,243	26.14%	463	2.94%	52	0.73%	13	1,771
Knox	62.83%	2,524	33.48%	1,345	3.06%	123	0.62%	25	4,017
Lancaster	48.14%	60,805	49.42%	62,421	0.84%	1,064	1.60%	2,024	126,314
Lincoln	58.24%	9,454	39.68%	6,442	1.47%	239	0.61%	99	16,234
Logan	66.59%	273	32.44%	133	0.49%	2	0.49%	2	410
Loup	55.61%	218	43.88%	172	0.00%	0	0.51%	2	392
Madison	66.02%	9,182	30.56%	4,250	2.65%	369	0.77%	107	13,908
McPherson	69.55%	201	26.64%	77	3.46%	10	0.35%	1	289
Merrick	59.26%	2,023	39.37%	1,344	0.94%	32	0.44%	15	3,414
Morrill	69.29%	1,627	27.43%	644	2.51%	59	0.77%	18	2,348
Nance	55.37%	953	43.17%	743	0.93%	16	0.52%	9	1,721
Nemaha	61.60%	2,119	36.37%	1,251	1.66%	57	0.38%	13	3,440
Nuckolls	55.28%	1,231	43.06%	959	1.12%	25	0.54%	12	2,227
Otoe	58.26%	4,111	39.64%	2,797	1.42%	100	0.68%	48	7,056
Pawnee	55.68%	765	42.07%	578	1.46%	20	0.80%	11	1,374
Perkins	70.53%	993	27.84%	392	1.21%	17	0.43%	6	1,408
Phelps	68.05%	3,058	30.97%	1,392	0.73%	33	0.24%	11	4,494
Pierce	70.99%	2,259	25.93%	825	2.39%	76	0.69%	22	3,182
Platte	68.78%	9,163	29.40%	3,917	1.38%	184	0.44%	59	13,323
Polk	62.19%	1,579	36.71%	932	0.83%	21	0.28%	7	2,539
Red Willow	65.02%	3,269	32.98%	1,658	1.51%	76	0.50%	25	5,028
Richardson	63.25%	2,477	34.01%	1,332	2.40%	94	0.33%	13	3,916
Rock	59.24%	465	39.11%	307	1.66%	13	0.00%	0	785
Saline	40.81%	2,139	57.45%	3,011	1.07%	56	0.67%	35	5,241
Sarpy	64.61%	43,116	32.96%	21,994	1.58%	1,052	0.85%	569	66,731
Saunders	61.62%	6,266	36.00%	3,660	1.58%	161	0.80%	81	10,168
Scotts Bluff	63.01%	9,262	34.81%	5,117	1.61%	237	0.57%	84	14,700
Seward	56.61%	4,257	41.72%	3,137	1.04%	78	0.64%	48	7,520
Sheridan	74.63%	1,821	19.55%	477	4.88%	119	0.94%	23	2,440
Sherman	37.50%	582	60.76%	943	0.84%	13	0.90%	14	1,552
Sioux	72.61%	517	25.28%	180	1.69%	12	0.42%	3	712
Stanton	71.51%	1,762	25.65%	632	2.27%	56	0.57%	14	2,464
Thayer	52.50%	1,303	45.93%	1,140	1.17%	29	0.40%	10	2,482
Thomas	61.66%	238	35.75%	138	2.07%	8	0.52%	2	386
Thurston	52.55%	1,041	41.29%	818	5.20%	103	0.96%	19	1,981
Valley	55.40%	1,343	43.03%	1,043	1.16%	28	0.41%	10	2,424
Washington	65.47%	6,658	31.76%	3,230	1.99%	202	0.79%	80	10,170
Wayne	69.38%	2,626	28.06%	1,062	1.88%	71	0.69%	26	3,785
Webster	46.57%	849	51.51%	939	1.21%	22	0.71%	13	1,823
Wheeler	57.58%	247	40.56%	174	1.17%	5	0.70%	3	429
York	65.56%	4,300	33.28%	2,183	0.82%	54	0.34%	22	6,559

Counties that flipped from Republican to Democratic

- Lancaster (largest city: Lincoln)
- Saline (largest city: Crete)
- Greeley (largest city: Spalding)
- Sherman (largest city: Loup City)
- Gage (largest city: Beatrice)
- Webster (largest city: Red Cloud)
- Franklin (largest city: Franklin)
- Adams (largest city: Hastings)

== See also ==
- 2008 United States Senate elections
