= Senator Kavanagh =

Senator Kavanagh or Kavanaugh may refer to:

- Brian P. Kavanagh (born 1967), New York State Senate
- Edward Kavanagh (1795–1844), Maine State Senate
- John Kavanagh (Arizona politician) (born 1950), Arizona State Senate
- Frederick W. Kavanaugh (1871–1940), New York State Senate
- Walter J. Kavanaugh (1933–2008), New Jersey State Senate
- William Marmaduke Kavanaugh (1866–1915), U.S. Senator from Arkansas

== See also ==
- Senator Cavanagh (disambiguation)
- Senator Cavanaugh (disambiguation)
