= Scott Kleeb =

American businessman and politician

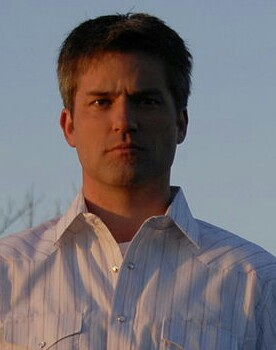
- Kleeb in 2008

Personal details
- Born: Scott Michael Kleeb; August 23, 1975 (age 50)
- Party: Democratic
- Spouse: Jane Fleming (m. 2007)
- Education: University of Colorado, Boulder (BA); Yale University (MA, PhD)

Scott Michael Kleeb (/klɛb/ KLEB; born August 23, 1975) is an American businessman and politician. He is the former CEO and president of Energy Pioneer Solutions, a company that created and then sold a new data-driven model for energy efficiency issues that focused on utilities and homeowners.

In 2006, he was defeated in a close race to represent Nebraska's 3rd congressional district. In 2008, he was the Democratic nominee in an unsuccessful bid for the U.S. Senate seat in Nebraska. His wife, Jane Fleming Kleeb, is the founder of Bold Nebraska and chair of the Nebraska Democratic Party.

== Early life and education ==
Kleeb was born in Turkey at a military hospital to parents who taught in military schools abroad. He was raised in Italy and speaks Italian fluently. He attended college at the University of Colorado Boulder, where he graduated summa cum laude; he then earned a master's degree in international relations and a Ph.D. in history from Yale University. He was also a Yale World Fellow.

== Career ==
Kleeb has been an adjunct professor of history at Hastings College in Hastings, Nebraska. He is the former Chief Executive Officer of Energy Pioneer Solutions, a residential energy efficiency business located in Hastings.

== Congressional campaigns ==
=== 3rd Congressional District ===
In 2006, Kleeb, then a ranch-hand at the McGinn Ranch in Custer County, was the Democratic candidate for Nebraska's 3rd congressional district seat. The 3rd is extremely difficult to campaign in and has few unifying influences. It covers nearly 65,000 square miles (170,000 km^{2}), two time zones, and 68.5 of Nebraska's 93 counties (one of which, Cherry County, is larger than the entire state of Connecticut). However, Kleeb raised more money than any other Democrat had raised in the district in decades. Overall, the race was the most expensive in the district since it assumed its current configuration in 1963.

Just before the election, polls showed Kleeb even with or ahead of his Republican opponent, state senator Adrian Smith, in a congressional district the GOP had held for 46 years. In 2004, the district gave Bush 75 percent of its votes.

As the race become more competitive than expected, it received late national attention from the House campaign committees. President George W. Bush also made an appearance in the district two days before the election to campaign for Smith — a sign that the national party was very concerned about its chances in what had long been presumed to be a very safe Republican seat.

Smith won by 10 percentage points, taking 55 percent of the vote to Kleeb's 45 percent. This was the closest a Democrat had come to winning the district in 16 years, and only the third time a Democrat had come reasonably close to winning this district in its current configuration. Besides Bush's 11th-hour visit, Smith likely rode the coattails of Governor Dave Heineman, who won many of the counties in this district by 80 percent or more in his bid for a full term.

In April 2007, state investigators were still working to determine who was behind a barrage of last-minute automated telephone calls to voters which, state officials said, distorted Kleeb's views. Some used his voice with the greeting: "Hi, this is Scott Kleeb!", with many of these calls made in the middle of the night.

=== U.S. Senate ===
In May 2008, Kleeb won the Democratic primary election for the open Nebraska U.S. Senate seat being vacated by Republican Chuck Hagel, with nearly 70 percent of the vote in a four-candidate race. His nearest opponent was Tony Raimondo, a former Republican.

On November 4, 2008, Kleeb lost to former Republican Governor of Nebraska Mike Johanns in the general election. Johanns had 58 percent of the vote, to Kleeb's 40 percent.

=== 2nd Congressional District ===
Media sources speculated that Kleeb could challenge U.S. Representative Brad Ashford in the 2016 Democratic primary. Kleeb would be challenging Ashford, a centrist Democrat, from the left. Kleeb's wife, Jane Kleeb, was asked about the possibility in January 2015 and said she was "not ready to comment on a possible run." Kleeb ultimately did not run against Ashford, who lost the general election to Republican Don Bacon.

== Family ==
In 2007, Kleeb married Jane Fleming, whom he had begun dating in 2006 while campaigning for a congressional seat. At the time she was the executive director of Young Democrats of America.

Jane Fleming Kleeb founded the progressive citizen advocacy group Bold Nebraska in 2010. In 2011, she was a major figure in getting the Keystone XL pipeline's proposed path changed so that it did not go across Nebraska's Sandhills and works with farmers and ranchers to fight eminent domain abuse. In a December 2011 interview with a local television station, she said that neither she nor her husband was considering running for the U.S. Senate seat of retiring senator Ben Nelson.

As of late 2011, Scott Kleeb and his wife were raising three young daughters.

Party political offices
Preceded by Charlie Matulka	Democratic nominee for United States Senator from Nebraska (Class 2); 2008	Succeeded by David Domina
