= Bold Nebraska =

Progressive political advocacy group

Bold Nebraska is a progressive political advocacy group founded by Jane Fleming Kleeb in 2010 in the state of Nebraska.

== Background ==
Bold Nebraska began as a progressive website, and it has been a vocal opponent of the Keystone XL Pipeline. Bold Nebraska has also advocated for gay rights. Jane Kleeb, who founded Bold Nebraska, serves as the group's director and Chair of the Democratic Party of Nebraska.

== Affiliation and funding ==
Bold Nebraska is an affiliate of ProgressNow. It has received funding from the Tides Advocacy Fund. In 2016 Bold Nebraska fell under the newly formed umbrella organization Bold Alliance.
