= 2014 United States House of Representatives elections in Nebraska =

- November 4, 2014

All 3 Nebraska seats to the United States House of Representatives
	Majority party	Minority party
Party	Republican	Democratic
Last election	3	0
Seats won	2	1
Seat change	▼1	▲1
Popular vote	340,816	185,234
Percentage	63.64%	34.59%
Swing	▼0.60%	▼1.16%

Republican
50–60%
60–70%
70–80%
80–90%
>90%
Democratic
40–50%
50–60%

The 2014 U.S. House of Representatives elections in Nebraska were held on Tuesday, November 4, 2014, to elect 3 members of the U.S. House of Representatives from the state of Nebraska, one from each of the state's three congressional districts. The elections coincided with the elections of other federal and state offices, including the governor of Nebraska and a United States senator. Primary elections to determine candidates in the general election were held on Tuesday, May 13, 2014. The members elected at this election will serve in the 114th Congress. This was the last time the Democrats won only the 2nd congressional district in Nebraska until 2026.

== Overview ==
Results of the 2014 United States House of Representatives elections in Nebraska by district:

District	Republican		Democratic		Others		Total		Result
District	Votes	%	Votes	%	Votes	%	Votes	%	Result
District 1	123,219	68.82%	55,838	31.18%	0	0.00%	179,057	100%	Republican hold
District 2	78,157	45.57%	83,872	48.90%	9,480	5.53%	171,509	100%	Democratic gain
District 3	139,440	75.39%	45,524	24.61%	0	0.00%	184,964	100%	Republican hold
Total	340,816	63.64%	185,234	34.59%	9,480	1.77%	535,530	100%	

== District 1 ==
2014 Nebraska's 1st congressional district election
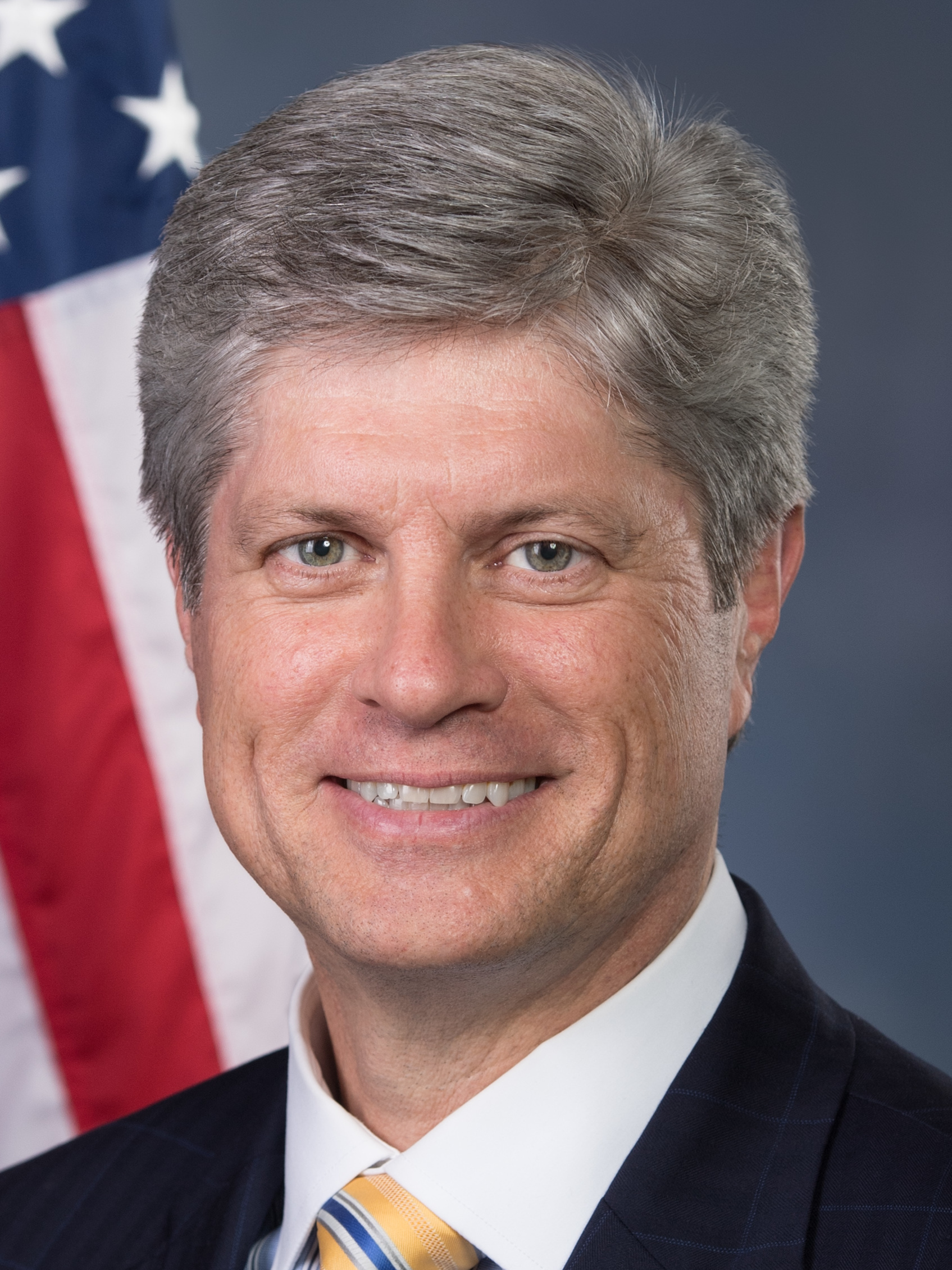

Nominee	Jeff Fortenberry	Dennis Crawford
Party	Republican	Democratic
Popular vote	123,219	55,838
Percentage	68.85%	31.15%
- County results Fortenberry: 60–70% 70–80% 80–90%
U.S. Representative before election
Jeff Fortenberry
Republican
Elected U.S. Representative
Jeff Fortenberry
Republican

The 1st district encompasses most of the eastern quarter of the state and almost completely envelops the 2nd district. It includes the state capital, Lincoln, as well as the cities of Fremont, Columbus, Norfolk, Beatrice and South Sioux City. Incumbent Republican Jeff Fortenberry, who has represented the district since 2005, ran for re-election. He was re-elected with 68% of the vote in 2012 and the district had a PVI of R+10.

=== Republican primary ===
Fortenberry considered running for the United States Senate seat being vacated by Republican Mike Johanns, but ultimately announced that he would not do so and would instead seek re-election.

==== Candidates ====
- Jeff Fortenberry, incumbent U.S. Representative
- Dennis Parker
- Jessica Turek

==== Results ====
Republican primary results
Party	Candidate	Votes	%
Republican	Jeff Fortenberry (inc.)	63,673	86.18%
Republican	Jessica L. Turek	5,902	7.99%
Republican	Dennis L. Parker	4,407	5.97%
Total votes		73,982	100.00%

=== Democratic primary ===
==== Candidates ====
- Dennis Crawford, Lincoln attorney

==== Results ====
Democratic primary results
Party	Candidate	Votes	%
Democratic	Dennis P. Crawford	24,140	100.00%
Total votes		24,140	100.00%

=== General election ===
==== Predictions ====
Source	Ranking	As of
The Cook Political Report	Safe R	November 3, 2014
Rothenberg	Safe R	October 24, 2014
Sabato's Crystal Ball	Safe R	October 30, 2014
RCP	Safe R	November 2, 2014
Daily Kos Elections	Safe R	November 4, 2014

==== Results ====
2014 Nebraska's 1st congressional district
Party	Candidate	Votes	%
Republican	Jeff Fortenberry (inc.)	123,219	68.85
Democratic	Dennis Crawford	55,838	31.15
Total votes		179,057	100.00
Republican hold			

== District 2 ==
2014 Nebraska's 2nd congressional district election
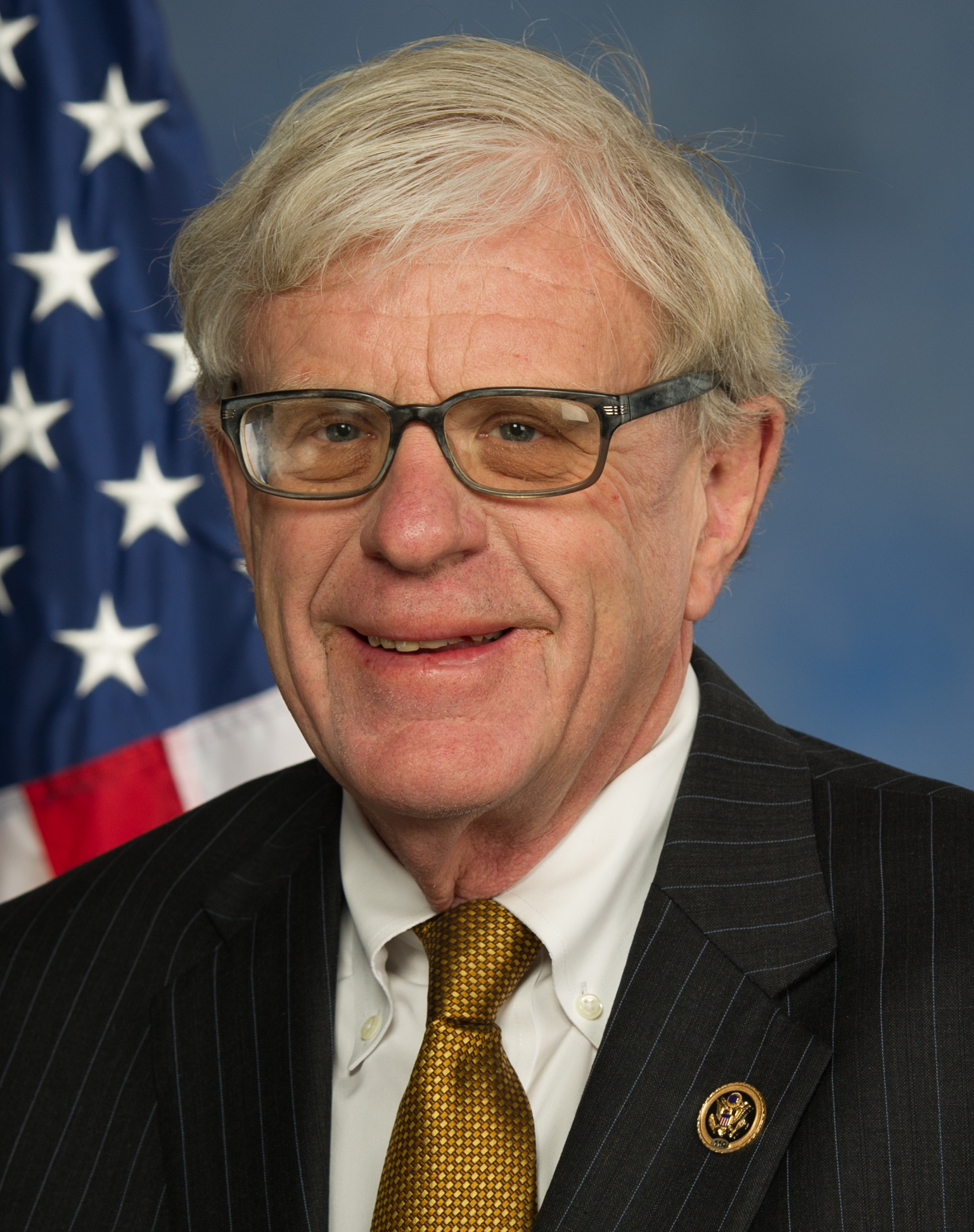

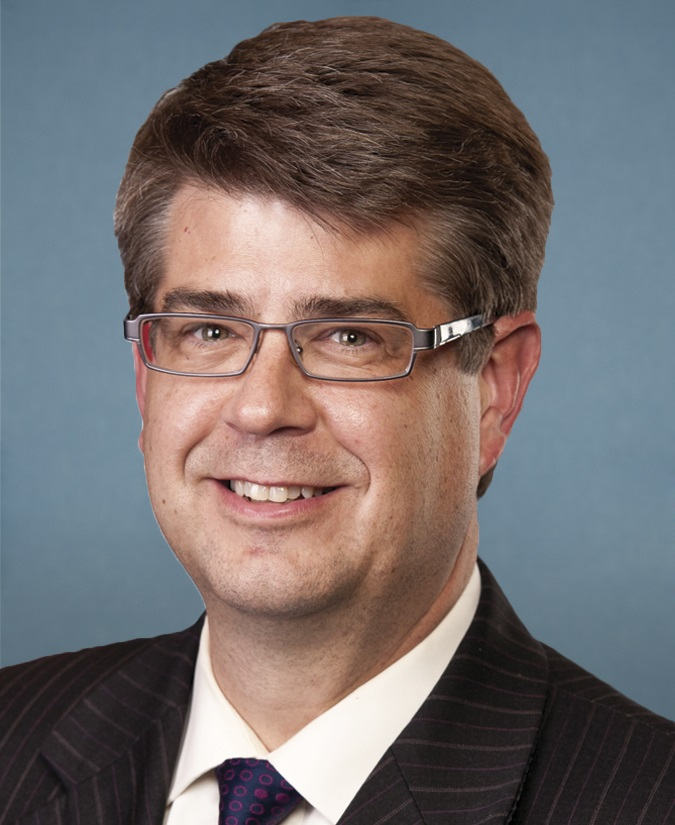

Nominee	Brad Ashford	Lee Terry	Steven Laird
Party	Democratic	Republican	Libertarian
Popular vote	83,872	78,157	9,021
Percentage	48.91%	45.59%	5.26%
- County results Ashford: 50–60% Terry: 50–60%
U.S. Representative before election
Lee Terry
Republican
Elected U.S. Representative
Brad Ashford
Democratic

The 2nd district is based in the Omaha–Council Bluffs metropolitan area and includes all of Douglas County and the urbanized areas of Sarpy County. Incumbent Republican Lee Terry, who had represented the district since 1999, ran for re-election. He was re-elected in 2012 with 51% of the vote in the district that had a PVI of R+4.

=== Republican primary ===
Terry faced a competitive primary challenge from businessman Dan Frei, who ran to his right. Despite outspending Frei by around 20-to-1, Terry only won the primary by 2,686 votes, or just under 6%. After his defeat, Frei refused to endorse Terry and he and his supporters openly floated the idea of running an independent or write-in campaign against Terry in the general election. Frei himself was ineligible to do so, having lost the primary election, but former state senator Chip Maxwell was mentioned as a possible candidate.

==== Candidates ====
- Lee Terry, incumbent U.S. Representative
- Dan Frei, businessman and member of the Nebraska Republican Party central committee

===== Declined =====
- Bob Krist, state senator
- Chip Maxwell, former state senator

==== Polling ====
Poll source	Date(s) administered	Sample size	Margin of error	Lee Terry	Dan Frei	Undecided
Frei Internal Poll	April 7–8, 2014	599	–	47%	36%	17%

==== Results ====
Republican primary results
Party	Candidate	Votes	%
Republican	Lee Terry (inc.)	25,812	52.93%
Republican	Dan Frei	22,970	47.07%
Total votes		48,782	100.00%

=== Democratic primary ===
After controversial comments made by Terry in October 2013, Omaha City Council President Pete Festersen, a Democrat, decided to run against Terry. However, Festersen announced on December 9, 2013, that he was ending his campaign because of the difficulty in balancing the campaign with his family and city council responsibilities. Democratic state senator Brad Ashford announced his candidacy in February 2014.

==== Candidates ====
- Brad Ashford, state senator
- Mark Aupperle

===== Withdrawn =====
- Pete Festersen, president of the Omaha City Council

===== Declined =====
- Larry Bradley, professor at University of Nebraska-Omaha, candidate for University of Nebraska Board of Regents in 2012
- David Domina, attorney and candidate for governor in 1986 (running for the U.S. Senate)
- John Ewing, Douglas County Treasurer and nominee for this seat in 2012
- Bob Krist, state senator
- Steve Lathrop, state senator
- Jeremy Nordquist, state senator
- Justin Wayne, president of the Omaha Public Schools Board

==== Results ====
Democratic primary results
Party	Candidate	Votes	%
Democratic	Brad Ashford	16,989	81.44%
Democratic	Mark Aupperle	3,872	18.56%
Total votes		20,861	100.00%

=== Libertarian primary ===
==== Candidates ====
- Steven Laird, Republican candidate for the seat in 1998, 2006 and 2008
- Andy Shambaugh

==== Results ====
Libertarian primary results
Party	Candidate	Votes	%
Libertarian	Steven Laird	77	59.23%
Libertarian	Andy Shambaugh	53	40.77%
Total votes		130	100.00%

=== Independents ===
==== Candidates ====
===== Withdrawn =====
- Chip Maxwell, former state senator

=== General election ===
==== Campaign ====
On May 21, 2014, Maxwell announced that he would run as an independent. A former Republican state senator, his party registration is presently nonpartisan. He has said that if he wins, he will rejoin the Republican Party and serve as a Republican in the House. He dismissed as "hysterical" the idea that his candidacy could be a "spoiler" that conservatives are using to defeat Terry by "any means necessary", whether by Maxwell winning or by him and Terry splitting the Republican vote, thus allowing Democratic nominee Brad Ashford to win, meaning that there would be an open Republican primary for the seat in 2016.

Despite collecting enough signatures to make the ballot, Maxwell withdrew from the race on July 24, saying that he had been "begged" by "high-profile" Republicans not to run and didn't want to create a "permanent rift" in the district's Republican Party. He did however say that he plans to run against Terry in the Republican primary in 2016 and noted that "I think this thing's a toss-up, even with me out of it."

==== Polling ====
Poll source	Date(s) administered	Sample size	Margin of error	Lee Terry (R)	Brad Ashford (D)	Steven Laird (L)	Undecided
NFM Research	October 21–25, 2014	365	± 5.1%	41%	46%	6%	7%
DCCC (D)	August 14, 2014	432	± 4.7%	45%	46%	—	9%
Global Strategy Group (D-Ashford)	May 29 – June 1, 2014	400	± 4.9%	41%	41%	4%	14%

Hypothetical polling

Poll source	Date(s) administered	Sample size	Margin of error	Lee Terry (R)	Pete Festersen (D)	Undecided
DCCC	October 2013	523	± 4.3%	42%	44%	14%

==== Predictions ====
Source	Ranking	As of
The Cook Political Report	Tossup	November 3, 2014
Rothenberg	Tilt D (flip)	October 24, 2014
Sabato's Crystal Ball	Lean D (flip)	October 30, 2014
RCP	Tossup	November 2, 2014
Daily Kos Elections	Tilt D (flip)	November 4, 2014

==== Results ====
Ashford won the race by a 3.3% margin, making Terry one of only two sitting Republicans to be defeated by a Democrat in 2014 (the other being Steve Southerland in Florida's 2nd).

Nebraska's 2nd congressional district, 2014
Party	Candidate	Votes	%
Democratic	Brad Ashford	83,872	48.91%
Republican	Lee Terry (inc.)	78,157	45.59%
Libertarian	Steven Laird	9,021	5.26%
Write-in		459	0.27%
Total votes		171,509	100.00%
Democratic gain from Republican			

== District 3 ==
2014 Nebraska's 3rd congressional district election
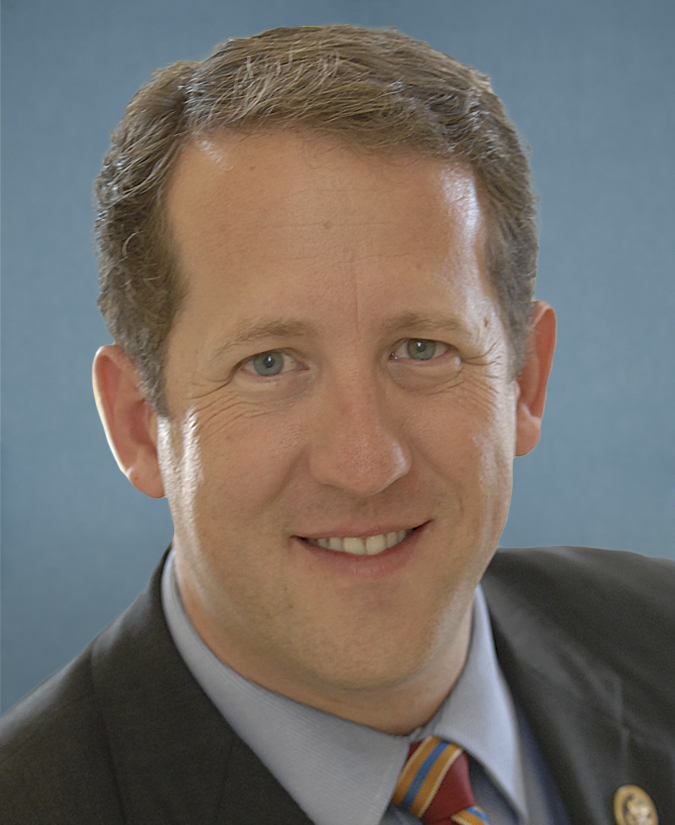

Nominee	Adrian Smith	Mark Sullivan
Party	Republican	Democratic
Popular vote	139,440	45,524
Percentage	75.39%	24.61%
- County results Smith: 50–60% 60–70% 70–80% 80–90% >90%
U.S. Representative before election
Adrian Smith
Republican
Elected U.S. Representative
Adrian Smith
Republican

The 3rd district encompasses the western three-fourths of the state; it is one of the largest non-at-large Congressional districts in the country, covering nearly 65,000 square miles (170,000 km^{2}), two time zones and 68.5 counties. It is mostly sparsely populated but includes the cities of Grand Island, Kearney, Hastings, North Platte and Scottsbluff. Incumbent Republican Adrian Smith, who had represented the district since 2007, ran for re-election. He was re-elected with 74% of the vote in 2012 and the district has a PVI of R+23.

=== Republican primary ===
Smith considered running for the United States Senate in 2014, but declined to do so.

==== Candidates ====
- Adrian Smith, incumbent U.S. Representative
- Tom Brewer, retired Army Colonel

==== Results ====
Republican primary results
Party	Candidate	Votes	%
Republican	Adrian Smith (inc.)	67,113	68.10%
Republican	Tom Brewer	31,436	31.90%
Total votes		98,549	100.00%

=== Democratic primary ===
==== Candidates ====
- Mark Sullivan, farmer and nominee for this seat in 2012

==== Results ====
Democratic primary results
Party	Candidate	Votes	%
Democratic	Mark Sullivan	20,069	100.00%
Total votes		20,069	100.00%

=== General election ===
==== Predictions ====
Source	Ranking	As of
The Cook Political Report	Safe R	November 3, 2014
Rothenberg	Safe R	October 24, 2014
Sabato's Crystal Ball	Safe R	October 30, 2014
RCP	Safe R	November 2, 2014
Daily Kos Elections	Safe R	November 4, 2014

==== Results ====
2014 Nebraska's 3rd congressional district
Party	Candidate	Votes	%
Republican	Adrian Smith (inc.)	139,440	75.39%
Democratic	Mark Sullivan	45,524	24.61%
Total votes		184,964	100.00%
Republican hold			

== See also ==
- 2014 United States House of Representatives elections
- 2014 United States elections
