= 2018 United States House of Representatives elections in Nebraska =

- November 6, 2018

All 3 Nebraska seats to the United States House of Representatives
	Majority party	Minority party
Party	Republican	Democratic
Last election	3	0
Seats won	3	0
Seat change	Steady	Steady
Popular vote	432,077	264,493
Percentage	62.03%	37.97%
Swing	▼8.71%	▲9.93%

Republican
50–60%
60–70%
70–80%
80–90%
>90%
Democratic
50–60%

The 2018 United States House of Representatives elections in Nebraska were held on Tuesday, November 6, 2018, to elect the three U.S. representatives from the U.S. state of Nebraska, one from each of the state's three congressional districts. Primaries were held on May 15, 2018. The elections and primaries coincided with the elections and primaries of other federal and state offices.

The 2018 elections saw all three incumbents elected (all from the Republican Party); thus the GOP retained control of all three House seats.

== Overview ==
Popular vote
Republican	62.03%
Democratic	37.97%

House seats
Republican	100%
Democratic	0%

=== District ===
Results of the 2018 United States House of Representatives elections in Nebraska by district:

District	Republican		Democratic		Others		Total		Result
District	Votes	%	Votes	%	Votes	%	Votes	%	Result
District 1	141,712	60.36%	93,069	39.64%	0	0.00%	234,781	100%	Republican hold
District 2	126,715	51.00%	121,770	49.00%	0	0.00%	248,485	100%	Republican hold
District 3	163,650	76.72%	49,654	23.28%	0	0.00%	213,304	100%	Republican hold
Total	432,077	62.56%	264,493	35.19%	0	0.00%	696,570	100%	

== District 1 ==
2018 Nebraska's 1st congressional district election
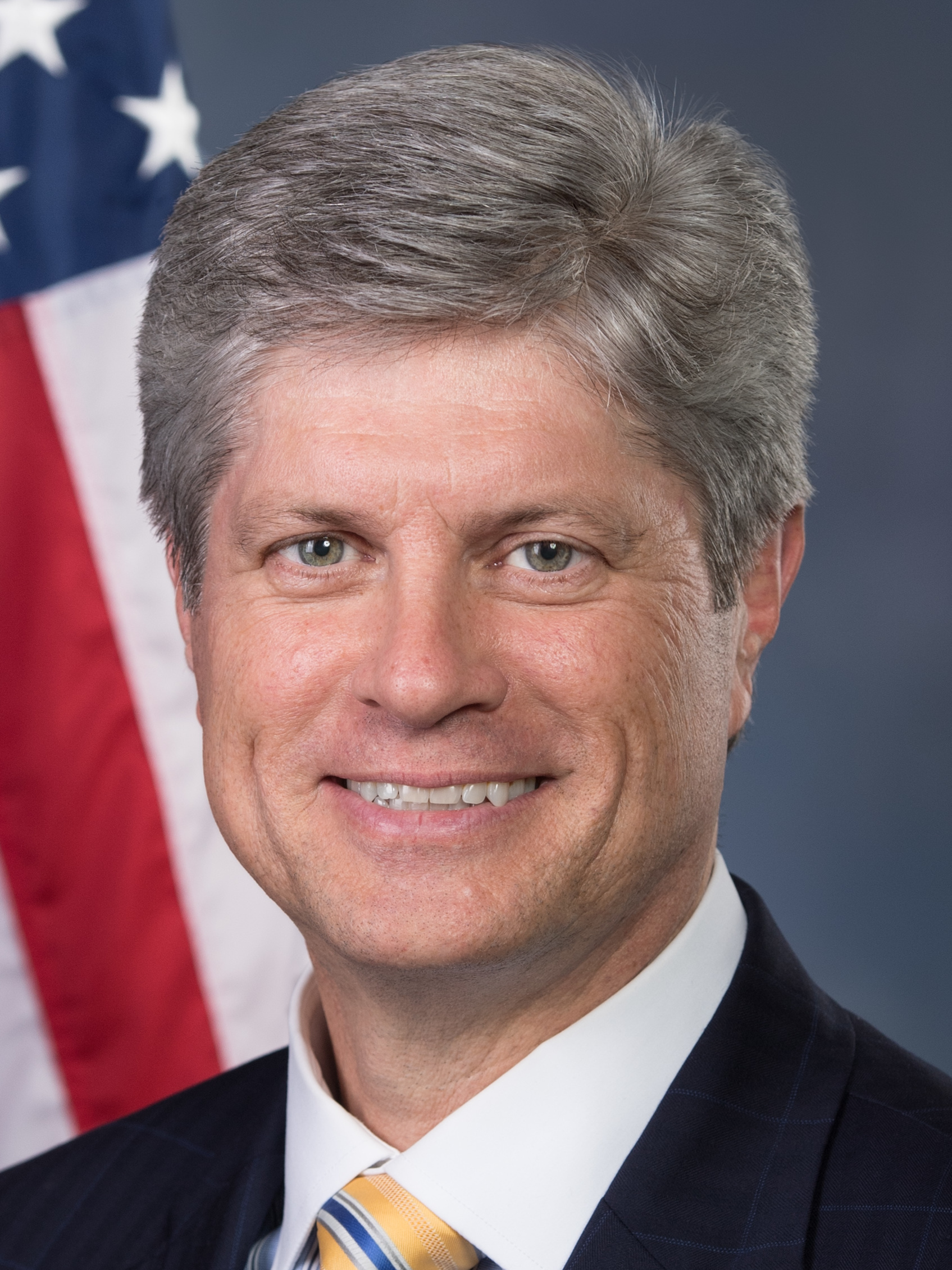

Nominee	Jeff Fortenberry	Jessica McClure
Party	Republican	Democratic
Popular vote	141,712	93,069
Percentage	60.4%	39.6%
- Precinct results Fortenberry: 50–60% 60–70% 70–80% 80–90% >90% McClure: 50–60% 60–70% 70–80% 80–90% >90% No votes
U.S. Representative before election
Jeff Fortenberry
Republican
Elected U.S. Representative
Jeff Fortenberry
Republican

The incumbent was Republican Jeff Fortenberry, who had represented the district since 2005. He was re-elected with 69% of the vote in 2016.

=== Democratic primary ===
- Dennis Crawford, attorney
- Jessica McClure, chemist

==== Primary results ====
Democratic primary results
Party	Candidate	Votes	%
Democratic	Jessica McClure	22,199	66.1
Democratic	Dennis P. Crawford	11,386	33.9
Total votes		33,585	100.0

=== Republican primary ===
- Jeff Fortenberry, incumbent

==== Primary results ====
Republican primary results
Party	Candidate	Votes	%
Republican	Jeff Fortenberry (incumbent)	51,809	100.0
Total votes		51,809	100.0

=== General election ===
==== Predictions ====
Source	Ranking	As of
The Cook Political Report	Safe R	November 5, 2018
Inside Elections	Safe R	November 5, 2018
Sabato's Crystal Ball	Safe R	November 5, 2018
RCP	Safe R	November 5, 2018
Daily Kos	Safe R	November 5, 2018
538	Safe R	November 7, 2018

==== Polling ====
Poll source	Date(s) administered	Sample size	Margin of error	Jeff Fortenberry (R)	Jessica McClure (D)	Undecided
Change Research (D)	October 24–25, 2018	742	–	55%	39%	–

==== Results ====
Nebraska's 1st congressional district, 2018
Party	Candidate	Votes	%
Republican	Jeff Fortenberry (incumbent)	141,712	60.4
Democratic	Jessica McClure	93,069	39.6
Total votes		234,781	100.0
Republican hold			

== District 2 ==
2018 Nebraska's 2nd congressional district election
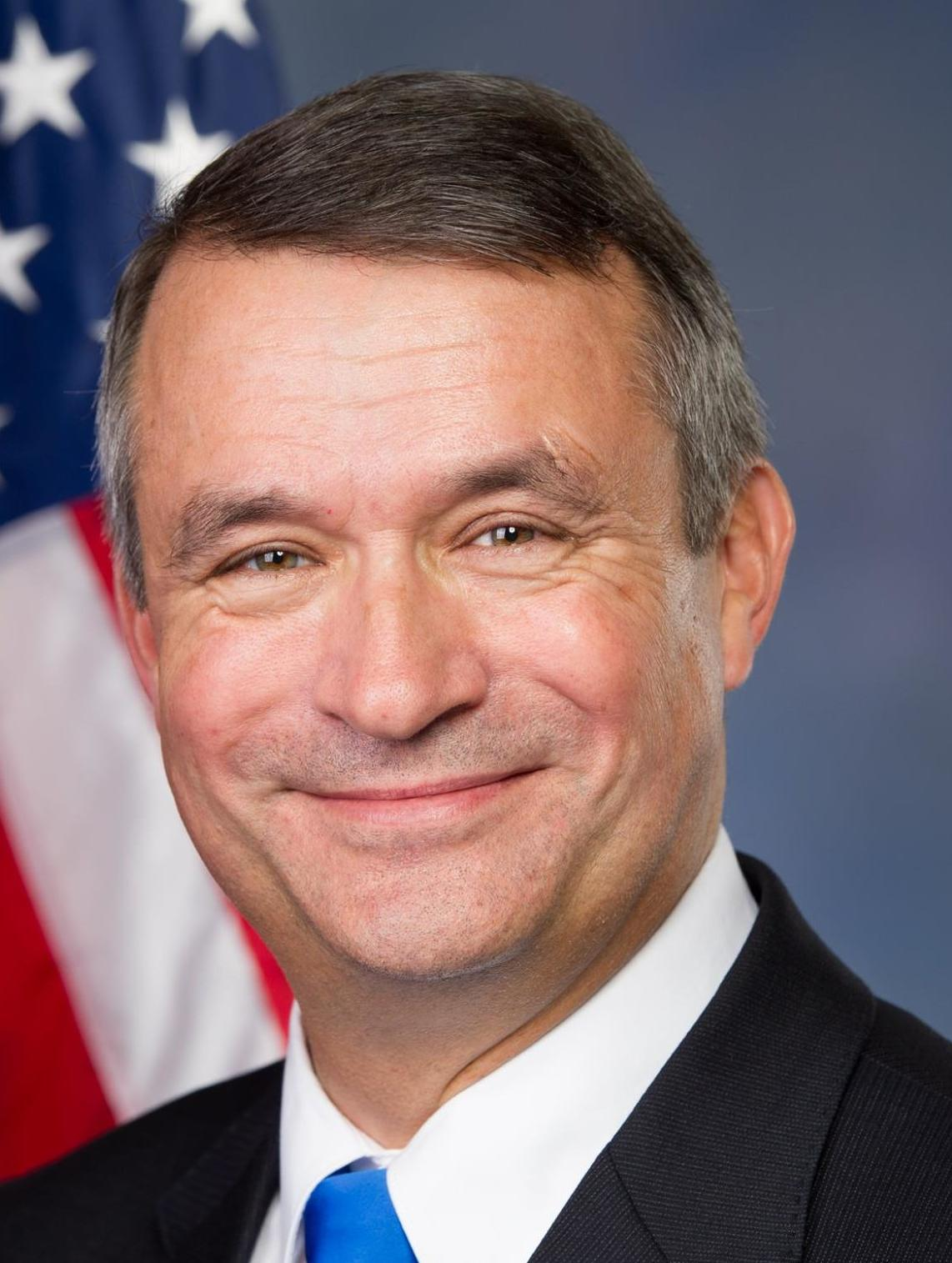

Nominee	Don Bacon	Kara Eastman
Party	Republican	Democratic
Popular vote	126,715	121,770
Percentage	51.0%	49.0%
- County results Bacon: 60–70% Eastman: 50–60%
U.S. Representative before election
Don Bacon
Republican
Elected U.S. Representative
Don Bacon
Republican

The incumbent was Republican Don Bacon, who had represented the district since 2017. He flipped the district and was elected with 49% of the vote in 2016.

=== Democratic primary ===
- Brad Ashford, former U.S. representative
- Kara Eastman, founder of Omaha Healthy Kids Alliance and vice chair of the Metropolitan Community College Board of Governors

=== Endorsements ===
Kara Eastman

Individuals

- Anne Boyle, former Nebraska state public service commissioner
- Ben Gray, Omaha city councilman
- Crystal Rhoades, Nebraska state public service commissioner
- Tony Vargas, Nebraska state senator
- Justin Wayne, Nebraska state senator

Organizations

- Climate Hawks Vote
- Insulators Local 39
- Justice Democrats
- Progressive Change Campaign Committee
  1. VOTEPROCHOICE

Parties

- Cannabis Rights Party of Nebraska

=== Debate ===
2018 Nebraska's 2nd congressional district democratic primary debate
No.	Date	Host	Moderator	Link	Democratic	Democratic
Key: P Participant A Absent N Not invited I Invited W Withdrawn						
Key: P Participant A Absent N Not invited I Invited W Withdrawn					Brad Ashford	Kara Eastman
1	Apr. 24, 2018	KMTV-TV; Omaha World-Herald	Craig Nigrelli; Mike'l Severe		P	P

=== Primary results ===
Democratic primary results
Party	Candidate	Votes	%
Democratic	Kara Eastman	21,357	51.64
Democratic	Brad Ashford	19,998	48.36
Total votes		41,355	100.00

=== Republican primary ===
- Don Bacon, incumbent

==== Primary results ====
Republican primary results
Party	Candidate	Votes	%
Republican	Don Bacon (incumbent)	33,852	100.0
Total votes		33,852	100.0

=== General election ===
==== Predictions ====
Source	Ranking	As of
The Cook Political Report	Lean R	November 5, 2018
Inside Elections	Lean R	November 5, 2018
Sabato's Crystal Ball	Lean R	November 5, 2018
RCP	Lean R	November 5, 2018
Daily Kos	Likely R	November 5, 2018
538	Tossup	November 7, 2018

==== Polling ====
Poll source	Date(s) administered	Sample size	Margin of error	Don Bacon (R)	Kara Eastman (D)	Undecided
DFM Research	October 23–25, 2018	350	± 5.2%	52%	45%	3%
Meeting Street Research (R-Bacon)	October 1–2, 2018	400	± 4.9%	49%	40%	9%
GQR Research (D-Eastman)	September 27–30, 2018	400	± 4.9%	49%	45%	6%
NYT Upshot/Siena College	September 23–26, 2018	512	± 4.5%	51%	42%	7%

==== Results ====
Nebraska's 2nd congressional district, 2018
Party	Candidate	Votes	%
Republican	Don Bacon (incumbent)	126,715	51.0
Democratic	Kara Eastman	121,770	49.0
Total votes		248,485	100.0
Republican hold			

== District 3 ==
2018 Nebraska's 3rd congressional district election
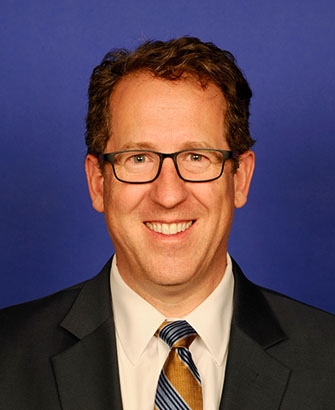

Nominee	Adrian Smith	Paul Theobald
Party	Republican	Democratic
Popular vote	163,650	49,654
Percentage	76.7%	23.3%
- Precinct results Smith: 50–60% 60–70% 70–80% 80–90% >90% Theobald: 50–60% 60–70%
U.S. Representative before election
Adrian Smith
Republican
Elected U.S. Representative
Adrian Smith
Republican

The incumbent was Republican Adrian Smith, who had represented the district since 2007. He was re-elected unopposed in 2016.

=== Democratic primary ===
- Paul Theobald, educator and author

==== Primary results ====
Democratic primary results
Party	Candidate	Votes	%
Democratic	Paul Theobald	16,395	100.0
Total votes		16,395	100.0

=== Republican primary ===
- Larry Bolinger, author
- Arron Kowalski
- Kirk Penner, businessman
- Adrian Smith, incumbent

==== Primary results ====
Republican primary results
Party	Candidate	Votes	%
Republican	Adrian Smith (incumbent)	50,878	65.74
Republican	Kirk Penner	20,116	25.99
Republican	Arron Kowalski	4,461	5.76
Republican	Larry Lee Scott Bolinger	1,935	2.50
Total votes		77,390	100.00

=== General election ===
==== Predictions ====
Source	Ranking	As of
The Cook Political Report	Safe R	November 5, 2018
Inside Elections	Safe R	November 5, 2018
Sabato's Crystal Ball	Safe R	November 5, 2018
RCP	Safe R	November 5, 2018
Daily Kos	Safe R	November 5, 2018
538	Safe R	November 7, 2018

==== Results ====
Nebraska's 3rd congressional district, 2018
Party	Candidate	Votes	%
Republican	Adrian Smith (incumbent)	163,650	76.7
Democratic	Paul Theobald	49,654	23.3
Total votes		213,304	100.0
Republican hold			
