= 2012 United States House of Representatives elections in Nebraska =

- November 6, 2012

All 3 Nebraska seats to the United States House of Representatives
	Majority party	Minority party
Party	Republican	Democratic
Last election	3	0
Seats won	3	0
Seat change	Steady	Steady
Popular vote	496,276	276,239
Percentage	64.24%	35.75%
Swing	▼3.31%	▲7.43%

Republican
50–60%
60–70%
70–80%
80–90%
90–100%
Democratic
50–60%

The 2012 United States House of Representatives elections in Nebraska were held on Tuesday, November 6, 2012, and elected the three U.S. representatives from the state of Nebraska. The elections coincided with the elections of other federal and state offices, including a quadrennial presidential election and an election to the U.S. Senate. Primary elections were held on May 15, 2012.

== Redistricting ==
A redistricting plan was passed by the Nebraska Legislature on May 24, 2011, after a five-hour Democratic-led filibuster was defeated. The plan signed into law by Republican Governor Dave Heineman.

== District 1 ==
2012 Nebraska's 1st congressional district election
- November 6, 2012
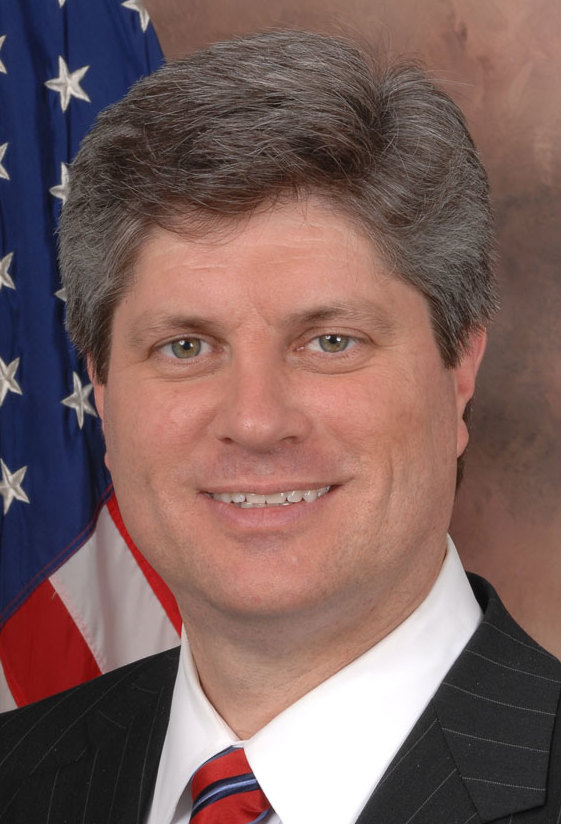

Nominee	Jeff Fortenberry	Korey Reiman
Party	Republican	Democratic
Popular vote	174,889	81,206
Percentage	68.29%	31.71%
- County results Fortenberry: 50–60% 60–70% 70–80% 80–90%
U.S. Representative before election
Jeff Fortenberry
Republican
Elected U.S. Representative
Jeff Fortenberry
Republican

Republican Jeff Fortenberry, who has represented Nebraska's 1st congressional district since 2005, did not run for the U.S. Senate, and is running for re-election.

=== Republican primary ===
==== Candidates ====
===== Nominee =====
- Jeff Fortenberry, incumbent U.S. Representative

===== Eliminated in primary =====
- Dennis Parker, former professional musician and candidate for the 3rd district in 2010,
- Jessica Turek, writer and drummer

==== Primary results ====
Republican primary results
Party	Candidate	Votes	%
Republican	Jeff Fortenberry (incumbent)	55,658	86.4
Republican	Jessica Turek	5,255	8.2
Republican	Dennis Parker	3,511	5.4
Total votes		64,424	100.0

=== Democratic primary ===
==== Candidates ====
===== Nominee =====
- Korey Reiman, attorney

===== Withdrawn =====
- Robert Way, Army combat medic

==== Primary results ====
Democratic primary results
Party	Candidate	Votes	%
Democratic	Korey Reiman	14,804	62.9
Democratic	Robert Way (withdrawn)	8,728	37.1
Total votes		23,532	100.0

=== General election ===
==== Polling ====
Poll source	Date(s) administered	Sample size	Margin of error	Jeff Fortenberry (R)	Korey Reiman (D)	Undecided
Wiese Research Associates	October 23–25, 2012	200 (RV)	±6.9%	65%	24%	11%
Wiese Research Associates	September 17–20, 2012	169 (LV)	±5.4%	69%	24%	7%

==== Results ====
Nebraska's 1st congressional district, 2012
Party	Candidate	Votes	%
Republican	Jeff Fortenberry (incumbent)	174,889	68.3
Democratic	Korey L. Reiman	81,206	31.7
Total votes		256,095	100.0
Republican hold			

==== Predictions ====
Source	Ranking	As of
The Cook Political Report	Safe R	November 5, 2012
Rothenberg	Safe R	November 2, 2012
Roll Call	Safe R	November 4, 2012
Sabato's Crystal Ball	Safe R	November 5, 2012
NY Times	Safe R	November 4, 2012
RCP	Safe R	November 4, 2012
The Hill	Safe R	November 4, 2012

== District 2 ==
2012 Nebraska's 2nd congressional district election
- November 6, 2012
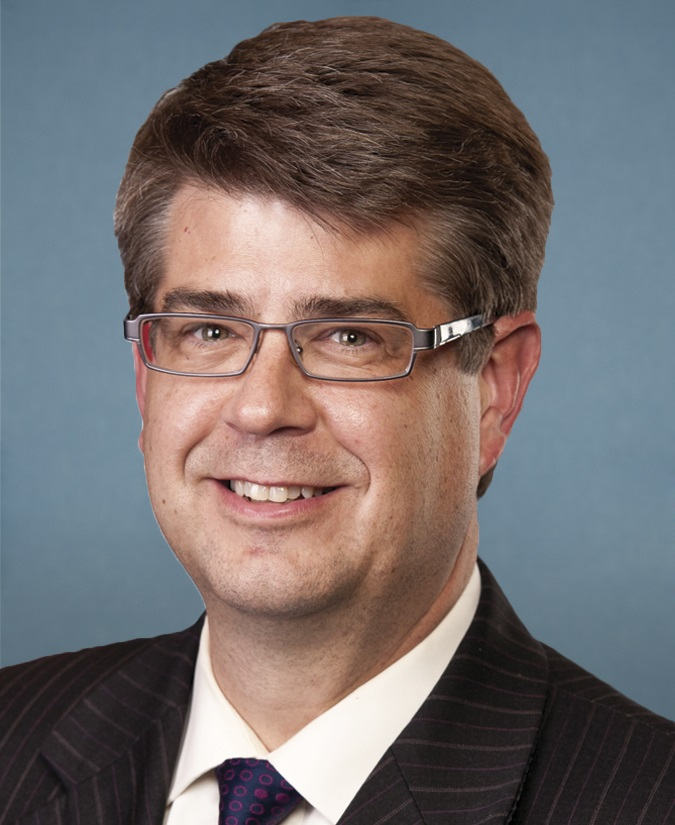

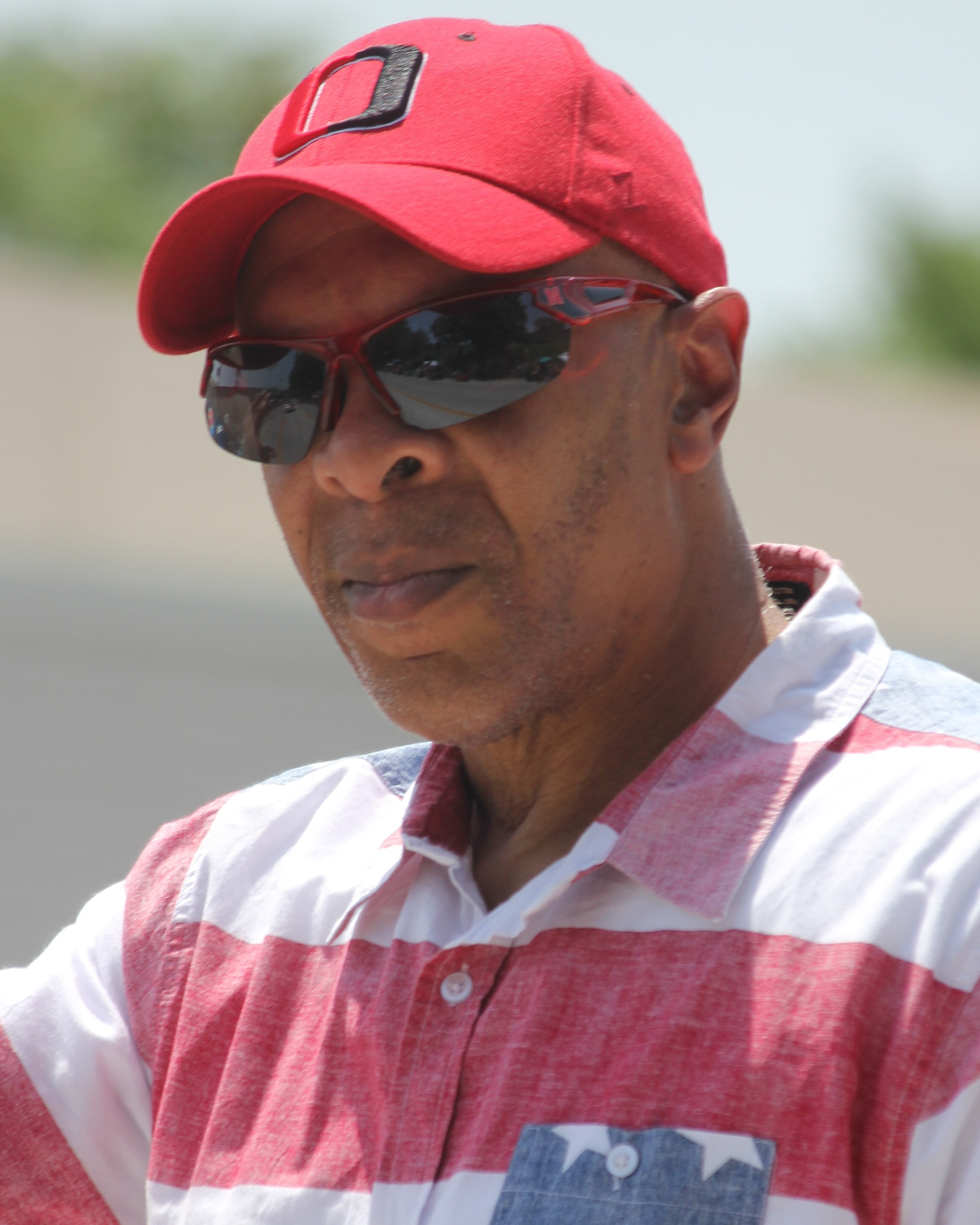
Nominee	Lee Terry	John Ewing Jr.
Party	Republican	Democratic
Popular vote	133,964	129,767
Percentage	50.79%	49.21%
- County results Terry: 60–70% Ewing: 50–60%
U.S. Representative before election
Lee Terry
Republican
Elected U.S. Representative
Lee Terry
Republican

Republican Lee Terry, who has represented Nebraska's 2nd congressional district since 1999, did not run for the U.S. Senate, and ran for re-election.

David Wasserman of The Cook Political Report rates the race as "Likely Republican."

=== Republican primary ===
==== Candidates ====
===== Nominee =====
- Lee Terry, incumbent U.S. Representative

===== Eliminated in primary =====
- Paul Anderson, employee of BNSF Railway
- Glenn Freeman, former chairman of the Douglas County Republican Party
- Jack Heidel, the chairman of the mathematics department at the University of Nebraska at Omaha;
- Brett Lindstrom, a financial adviser and former Nebraska Cornhuskers quarterback

==== Primary results ====
Republican primary results
Party	Candidate	Votes	%
Republican	Lee Terry (incumbent)	27,998	59.5
Republican	Brett Lindstrom	10,753	22.8
Republican	Jack Heidel	5,406	11.5
Republican	Glenn Freeman	1,885	4.0
Republican	Paul Anderson	1,051	2.2
Total votes		47,093	100.0

=== Democratic primary ===
==== Candidates ====
===== Nominee =====
- John Ewing Jr., Douglas County Treasurer

===== Eliminated in primary =====
- Gwen Howard, state senator

===== Declined =====
- Howard Warren Buffett, director of the U.S. Department of Defense's agriculture development program in Iraq and Afghanistan and the grandson of investor and philanthropist Warren Buffett

==== Primary results ====
Democratic primary results
Party	Candidate	Votes	%
Democratic	John Ewing	17,954	62.0
Democratic	Gwen Howard	11,009	38.0
Total votes		28,963	100.0

=== General election ===
==== Campaign ====
After his primary victory, Ewing promptly took a break from fundraising before starting up again at the end of June.By the end of the fundraising quarter had only raised $300,000 to Terry's $1.3 million. The Omaha World-Herald would later describe this is "perhaps the race's defining moment" and one that prevented Ewing from gaining much traction in the general election.

Terry's campaign also made mistakes, most notably releasing an ad that inaccurately quoted a nonprofit advocacy group.

==== Endorsements ====
Lee Terry (R)

Organizations

- National Federation of Independent Business
John Ewing (D)

Newspapers

- Omaha World-Herald

==== Polling ====
Poll source	Date(s) administered	Sample size	Margin of error	Lee Terry (R)	John Ewing (D)	Undecided
Wiese Research Associates	October 23–25, 2012	352 (LV)	±5.2%	47%	42%	11%
DCCC (D)	October 14, 2012	525 (LV)	±4.3%	48%	44%	7%
Wiese Research Associates	September 17–20, 2012	331 (LV)	±5.4%	52%	39%	10%

==== Predictions ====
Source	Ranking	As of
The Cook Political Report	Likely R	November 5, 2012
Rothenberg	Safe R	November 2, 2012
Roll Call	Safe R	November 4, 2012
Sabato's Crystal Ball	Safe R	November 5, 2012
NY Times	Safe R	November 4, 2012
RCP	Lean R	November 4, 2012
The Hill	Likely R	November 4, 2012

==== Results ====
Despite receiving very little help from national Democrats, Ewing outperformed Obama and lost to Terry by just 4,197 votes.

Nebraska's 2nd congressional district, 2012
Party	Candidate	Votes	%
Republican	Lee Terry (incumbent)	133,964	50.8
Democratic	John Ewing Jr.	129,767	49.2
Total votes		263,731	100.0
Republican hold			

== District 3 ==
2012 Nebraska's 3rd congressional district election
- November 6, 2012
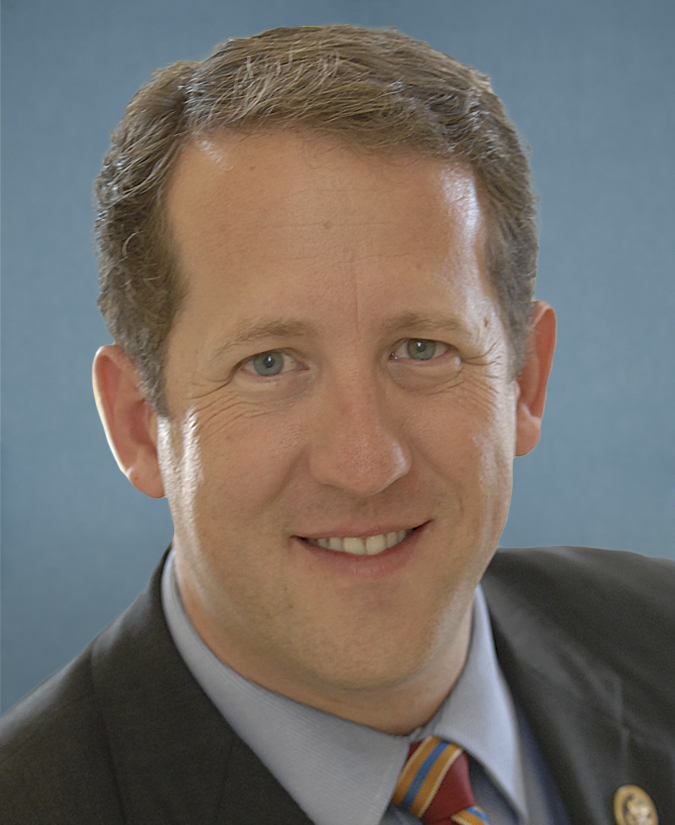

Nominee	Adrian Smith	Mark Sullivan
Party	Republican	Democratic
Popular vote	187,423	65,266
Percentage	74.17%	25.83%
- County results Smith: 50–60% 60–70% 70–80% 80–90% >90%
U.S. Representative before election
Adrian Smith
Republican
Elected U.S. Representative
Adrian Smith
Republican

Republican Adrian Smith, who has represented Nebraska's 3rd congressional district since 2007, is running for re-election.

=== Republican primary ===
==== Candidates ====
===== Nominee =====
- Adrian Smith, incumbent U.S. Representative

===== Eliminated in primary =====
- Bob Lingenfelter, farmer and former NFL offensive lineman

==== Primary results ====
Republican primary results
Party	Candidate	Votes	%
Republican	Adrian Smith (incumbent)	62,645	81.4
Republican	Bob Lingenfelter	14,297	18.6
Total votes		76,942	100.0

=== Democratic primary ===
==== Candidates ====
===== Nominee =====
- Mark Sullivan, farmer

==== Primary results ====
Democratic primary results
Party	Candidate	Votes	%
Democratic	Mark Sullivan	17,500	100.0
Total votes		17,500	100.0

=== General election ===
==== Polling ====
Poll source	Date(s) administered	Sample size	Margin of error	Adrian Smith (R)	Mark Sullivan (D)	Undecided
Wiese Research Associates	October 23–25, 2012	200 (RV)	±6.9%	64%	24%	12%
Wiese Research Associates	September 17–20, 2012	156 (LV)	±5.4%	70%	19%	11%

==== Predictions ====
Source	Ranking	As of
The Cook Political Report	Safe R	November 5, 2012
Rothenberg	Safe R	November 2, 2012
Roll Call	Safe R	November 4, 2012
Sabato's Crystal Ball	Safe R	November 5, 2012
NY Times	Safe R	November 4, 2012
RCP	Safe R	November 4, 2012
The Hill	Safe R	November 4, 2012

==== Results ====
Nebraska's 3rd congressional district, 2012
Party	Candidate	Votes	%
Republican	Adrian Smith (incumbent)	187,423	74.2
Democratic	Mark Sullivan	65,266	25.8
Total votes		252,689	100.0
Republican hold			
