= Jeff Fortenberry =

American politician (born 1960)

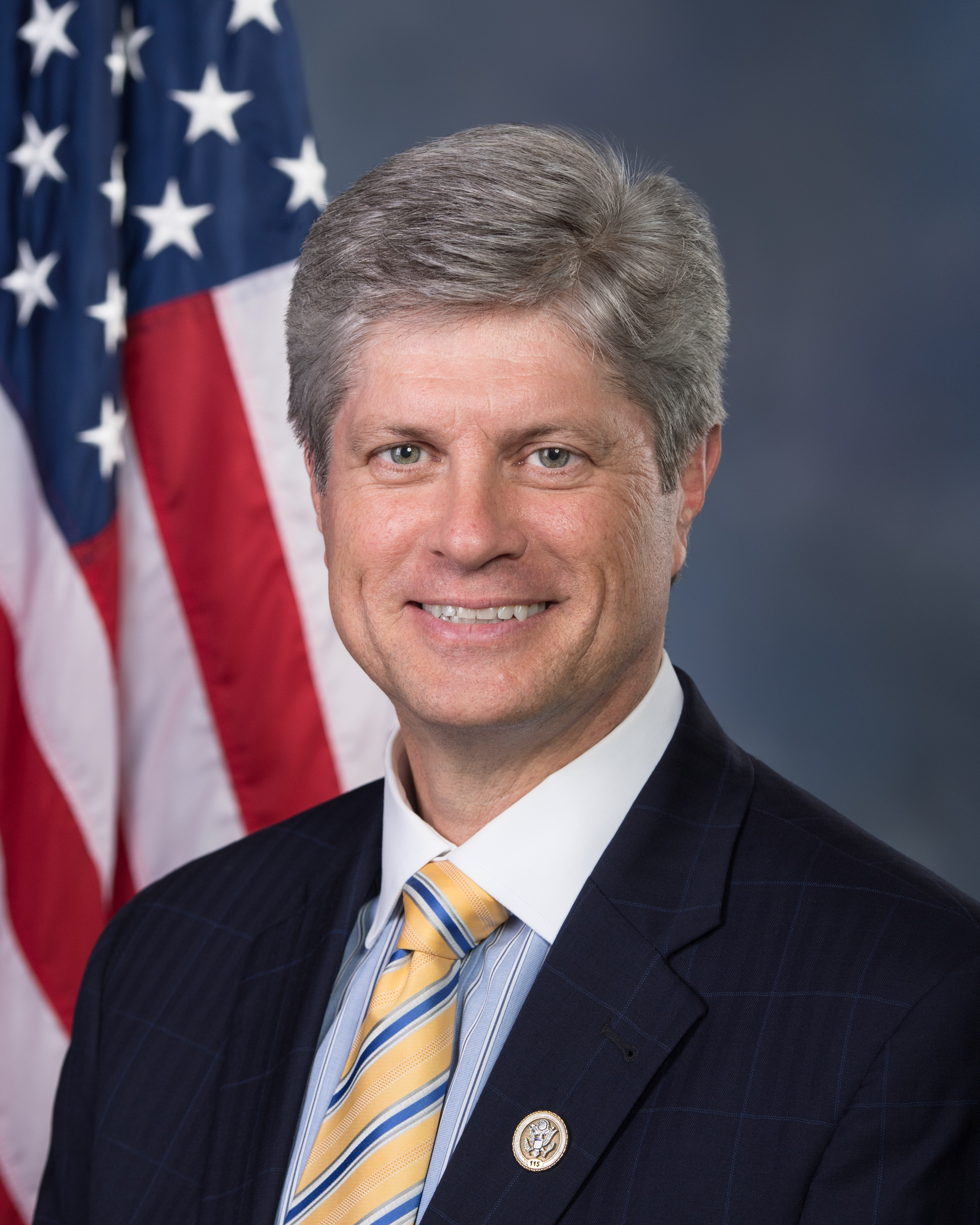
- Official portrait, 2018

Member of the U.S. House of Representatives from Nebraska's 1st district
- In office January 3, 2005 – March 31, 2022
- Preceded by: Doug Bereuter
- Succeeded by: Mike Flood

Personal details
- Born: Jeffrey Lane Fortenberry; December 27, 1960 (age 65) Baton Rouge, Louisiana, U.S.
- Party: Republican
- Spouse: Celeste Fortenberry
- Education: Louisiana State University (BA); Georgetown University (MPP); Franciscan University (ThM)

Criminal details
- Conviction(s): Scheming to falsify and conceal material facts (one count); Making false statements (two counts)
- Penalty: 2 years probation; 320 hours community service; $25,000 fine
- Status: Convictions and sentence overturned, DOJ moves to dismiss all charges
- Fortenberry's voice Fortenberry on the death of James H. Billington, former Librarian of Congress. Recorded December 12, 2018

Jeffrey Lane Fortenberry (born December 27, 1960) is an American politician. He served in the United States House of Representatives from 2005 to 2022, representing Nebraska's 1st congressional district as a member of the Republican Party.

In October 2021, a federal grand jury indicted Fortenberry on three charges of lying to investigators and concealing information about foreign campaign contributions. He was convicted of all three felony counts in March 2022. After the convictions, Speaker of the House Nancy Pelosi and House Minority Leader Kevin McCarthy called upon Fortenberry to resign. He officially resigned on March 31, 2022. In June 2022, he was sentenced to 2 years' probation, plus community service and a fine. His conviction was overturned in December 2023.

== Early life, education and early career ==
Fortenberry graduated from Catholic High in his native Baton Rouge, Louisiana. He holds a bachelor's degree in economics from Louisiana State University, a master's degree in public policy from Georgetown University, and a master's degree in theology from the Franciscan University of Steubenville.

Fortenberry previously worked as an economist, in local economic development, and as a publishing executive for Sandhills Publishing. He was also a policy analyst for the Senate Subcommittee on Intergovernmental Relations. Fortenberry was an at-large member of the Lincoln City Council from 1997 to 2001.

== U.S. House of Representatives ==
=== Elections ===
==== 2004 ====
Fortenberry won the seven-candidate Republican primary to replace the retiring Doug Bereuter with 39% of the vote. He defeated Curt Bromm (33%), the Speaker of the Nebraska Legislature, and Club for Growth-endorsed businessman Greg Ruehle (21%). In the general election, he defeated State Senator Matt Connealy 54%–43%. He won all but two counties: Thurston and Burt.

2004 U.S. House election in Nebraska’s 1st congressional district
Party	Candidate	Votes	%	±%
Republican	Jeff Fortenberry	143,756	54.2%	
Democratic	Matt Connealy	113,971	43.0%	
Green	Steve Larrick	7,345	2.8%	

==== 2006 ====
Fortenberry was reelected to a second term, defeating former Lieutenant Governor Maxine Moul, 58%–42%, winning all but Burt County.

2006 U.S. House election in Nebraska’s 1st congressional district
Party	Candidate	Votes	%	±%
Republican	Jeff Fortenberry	121,015	58.4%	
Democratic	Maxine Moul	86,360	41.6%	

==== 2008 ====
Fortenberry was reelected to a third term, defeating Marine veteran Max Yashirin 70–30%.

2008 U.S. House election in Nebraska’s 1st congressional district
Party	Candidate	Votes	%	±%
Republican	Jeff Fortenberry	184,923	70.4%	
Democratic	Max Yashirin	77,897	29.6%	

==== 2010 ====
Fortenberry was challenged in the Republican primary for the first time since 2004. He drew two opponents and won with 84% of the vote. He was reelected to a fourth term, defeating legislative staffer Ivy Harper, 71%–29%.

2010 U.S. House election in Nebraska’s 1st congressional district
Party	Candidate	Votes	%	±%
Republican	Jeff Fortenberry	116,871	71.3%	
Democratic	Ivy Harper	47,106	28.7%	

==== 2012 ====
Fortenberry drew two opponents in the Republican primary again, but won with 86% of the vote.

2012 U.S. House election in Nebraska’s 1st congressional district
Party	Candidate	Votes	%	±%
Republican	Jeff Fortenberry	174,889	68.3%	
Democratic	Korey L. Reiman	81,206	31.7%	

==== 2014 ====
Fortenberry was reelected to a sixth term, defeating the Democratic nominee, attorney Dennis Crawford.

2014 U.S. House election in Nebraska’s 1st congressional district
Party	Candidate	Votes	%	±%
Republican	Jeff Fortenberry	123,219	68.8%	
Democratic	Dennis Crawford	55,838	31.2%	

==== 2016 ====
Fortenberry was reelected to a seventh term, defeating the Democratic nominee, physician Dan Wik.

2016 U.S. House election in Nebraska’s 1st congressional district
Party	Candidate	Votes	%	±%
Republican	Jeff Fortenberry	189,771	69.4%	
Democratic	Daniel M. Wik	83,467	30.6%	

==== 2018 ====
Campaigning for an eighth term in October 2018, it was reported that Fortenberry's chief of staff threatened a professor at the University of Nebraska–Lincoln, Ari Kohen, who had liked a Facebook post depicting a photo of a vandalized Fortenberry campaign sign, raising the issue to Kohen's supervisor as well as the dean and chancellor of the university. In reaction, Kohen raised a complaint with the Office of Congressional Ethics, alleging a chilling effect on free speech.

Fortenberry defeated Democratic nominee Jessica McClure with 60% of the vote, but lost in Lancaster County.

2018 U.S. House election in Nebraska’s 1st congressional district
Party	Candidate	Votes	%	±%
Republican	Jeff Fortenberry	141,172	60.36%	
Democratic	Jessica McClure	93,069	39.64%	

==== 2020 ====
Fortenberry defeated Democratic state Senator Kate Bolz with 59% of the vote.

2020 U.S. House election in Nebraska’s 1st congressional district
Party	Candidate	Votes	%	±%
Republican	Jeff Fortenberry	189,006	59.05%	
Democratic	Kate Bolz	119,622	37.07%	
Libertarian	Dennis B. Grace	8,938	2.08%	

=== Tenure ===
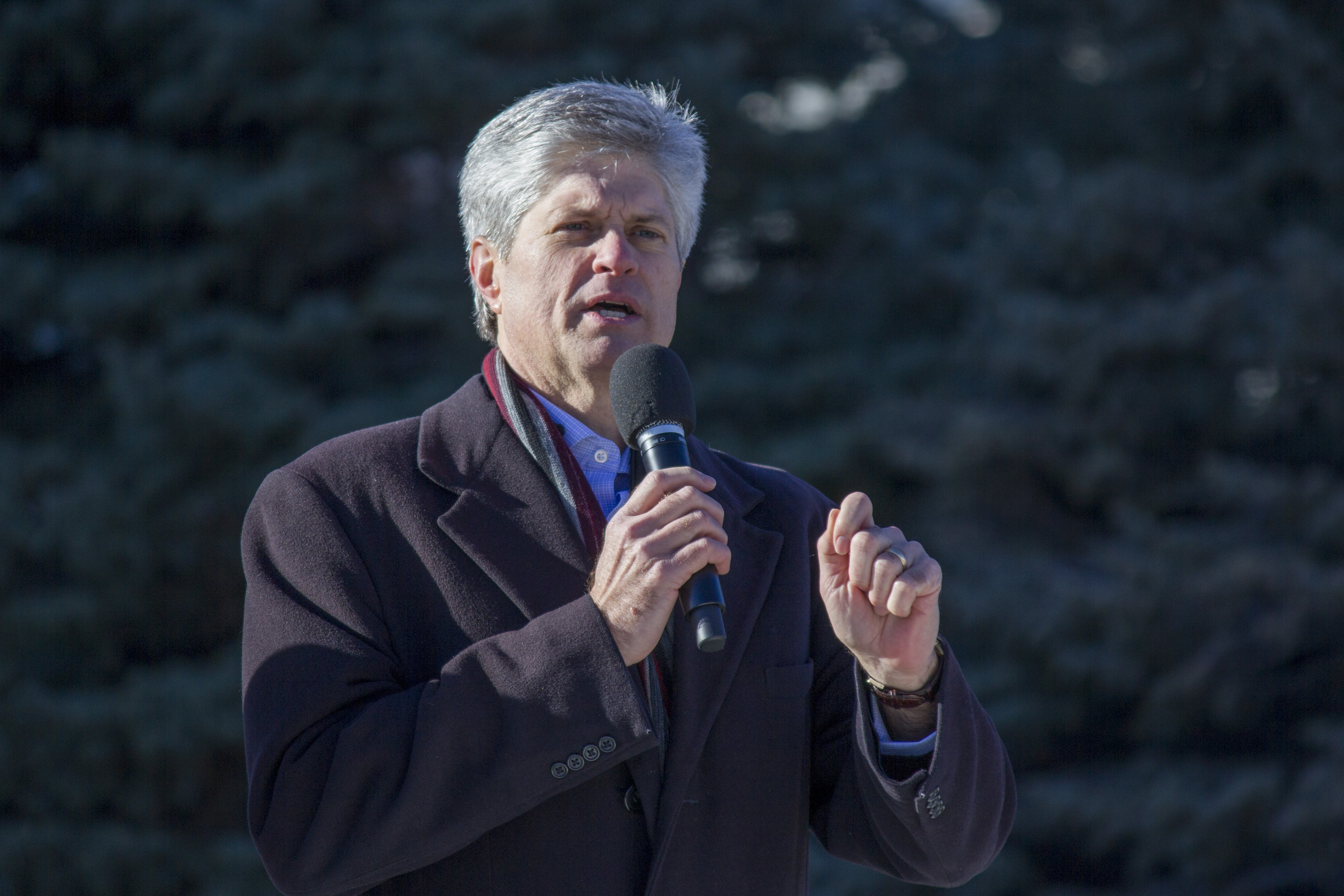
Fortenberry speaking in January 2018

During the week of April 12, 2021, Fortenberry made two false calls for emergency service to the United States Capitol Police through the emergency duress button in his Capitol office. The calls were apparently not for a genuine emergency, but only to check the agency's response time.

=== Political positions ===
==== Agriculture, energy, and environment ====
Fortenberry served on the Subcommittee on Agriculture, Rural Development, Food and Drug Administration, and Related Agencies. He introduced the Renewable Fuels for America's Future Act of 2010, designed to reduce subsidies for the production of ethanol. The act would result in taxpayer savings of $5.67 billion, according to economists Ernie Goss of Creighton University and Bruce Babcock of Iowa State University.

In 2020, Fortenberry signed a forest management agreement and gathered producers across Nebraska to discuss growing the agriculture family through integrating big data, precision farming, and value-adds to maximize incomes of farms of all sizes. On August 4, 2020, a bipartisan initiative supported by Fortenberry, the Great American Outdoors Act, was signed into law by President Donald Trump. In September 2020, Fortenberry sponsored H.R. 3651, which serves to facilitate the use of certain land in Nebraska for public outdoor recreational opportunities and for other purposes.

==== Healthcare ====
Fortenberry voted against the Patient Protection and Affordable Care Act, but said in 2010 that he supported "the right type of [health care] reform", incorporating measures to reduce costs, improve outcomes and protect vulnerable people. He introduced H.R. 321, the SCHIP Plus Act of 2009, to offer eligible families the choice to retain coverage for their children in the State Children's Health Insurance Program (SCHIP) or using program funds to help pay for family insurance plans. He introduced H.R. 5479, aimed at protecting people with preexisting conditions.

In 2020, Fortenberry introduced Matt's Act, named in honor of one of his constituents who was diagnosed with type 1 diabetes at age 13. The legislation would allow prescription drug manufacturers to sell insulin directly to patients. Fortenberry claimed it would reduce the price of insulin by two-thirds.

Fortenberry introduced ACT for ALS to help people suffering from amyotrophic lateral sclerosis (ALS) gain access to new treatments. The act would have the Department of Health and Human Services guide a new public-private partnership for streamlined research and drug approval for ALS. As of late December 2020, over 270 members of Congress co-signed the legislation.

==== Foreign and military affairs ====
In 2010, Foreign Policy magazine listed Fortenberry as a "new Republican powerbroker" on nuclear security issues. In an October 2010 endorsement, the Lincoln Journal Star called Fortenberry "uncommonly well-informed on international issues".

Fortenberry, and then-Appropriations Committee chair Nita Lowey co-sponsored the Middle East Partnership for Peace Act (MEPPA), which aims to ease tensions between Israelis and Palestinians by giving grants and loans to startup businesses.

In his role on the Appropriations Committee, Fortenberry advocated for funding to enhance Offutt Air Force Base facilities, STRATCOM facilities, and to provide a new runway.

==== Abortion ====
Fortenberry received a 100% anti-abortion score from the National Right to Life Committee in a ranking of members of the 111th Congress (2009–2011). He spoke annually at the March for Life.

==== COVID-19 pandemic ====
During the COVID-19 pandemic, Fortenberry supported the Paycheck Protection Program (PPP), providing small businesses with financial support throughout the pandemic. The program is estimated to have saved over 300,000 jobs in Nebraska. The state led the nation in PPP loans approved per capita.

==== Texas v. Pennsylvania ====
In December 2020, Fortenberry was one of 126 Republican members of the House of Representatives to sign an amicus brief in support of Texas v. Pennsylvania, a lawsuit filed at the United States Supreme Court contesting the results of the 2020 presidential election, in which Joe Biden defeated incumbent Donald Trump. The Supreme Court declined to hear the case on the basis that Texas lacked standing under Article III of the Constitution to challenge the results of an election held by another state.

Following the Supreme Court's decision not to take up Texas v. Pennsylvania, and the Electoral College's certification of the election results, Fortenberry recognized Joe Biden as President-elect and congratulated him on his victory. He voted against invalidating the election results on January 6, 2021, saying, "As much as I supported President Trump to win, I believe the proposed remedy to election irregularities is inconsistent with my legal obligation and the guidance of my conscience. I took an oath to uphold the Constitution. My decision is consistent with that oath. I will vote to certify the election."

==== January 6 commission ====
On May 19, 2021, Fortenberry was one of 35 Republicans who joined all Democrats in voting to approve legislation to establish the January 6 commission meant to investigate the storming of the U.S. Capitol.

==== Immigration ====
Fortenberry voted for the Further Consolidated Appropriations Act of 2020 which authorizes the Department of Homeland Security to nearly double the available H-2B visas for the remainder of FY 2020.

Fortenberry voted for the Consolidated Appropriations Act (H.R. 1158), which effectively prohibits Immigration and Customs Enforcement from cooperating with the Department of Health and Human Services to detain or remove illegal alien sponsors of Unaccompanied Alien Children.

=== Committee assignments ===
Fortenberry previously served on the Committee on Appropriations during the 117th Congress, but stepped down from all of his committee assignments on October 20, 2021, after being indicted for allegedly concealing information and lying to the FBI about illegal contributions to his campaign. His last committee assignments were:

- United States House Committee on Appropriations
  - United States House Appropriations Subcommittee on Agriculture, Rural Development, Food and Drug Administration, and Related Agencies (Ranking Member)
  - United States House Appropriations Subcommittee on State, Foreign Operations, and Related Programs

=== Caucus memberships ===
Fortenberry was known to serve on the below congressional caucuses.

- Republican Main Street Partnership
- Republican Governance Group
- Nuclear Security Working Group (Co-chair)
- Congressional Caucus on Beef
- Religious Minorities in the Middle East Caucus
- Friends of Switzerland Caucus
- Congressional Friends of Jordan Caucus (Vice Chair)
- Congressional Catholic Staff Association (chair)
- United States Congressional International Conservation Caucus (Co-chair)
- Republican Study Committee

== Federal conviction and resignation ==
On October 19, 2021, it was announced that Fortenberry was being investigated for about $30,000 in illegal campaign contributions, funneled through three strawmen at a 2016 fundraiser in Los Angeles, that his 2016 campaign received from the Nigerian-Lebanese, Paris-based billionaire Gilbert Chagoury, who also made contributions to three other American political candidates. A federal grand jury in Los Angeles indicted him on one count of scheming to falsify and conceal material facts and two counts of making false statements to federal investigators. On March 24, 2022, Fortenberry was convicted of all three felony counts of making false statements to the FBI and concealing information about his campaign donations.

Fortenberry was quoted as saying after the trial, "We always felt like it was going to be hard to have a fair process here, so this appeal starts immediately", but he could not appeal until after sentencing. Fortenberry faced up to five years in prison on each of the three felony counts, as well as fines. He is the first member of Congress convicted while in office since Chaka Fattah in 2016.

Within days of Fortenberry's conviction, lawmakers from both parties called on him to resign from Congress. House Minority Leader Kevin McCarthy said on March 25, "I think he had his day in court... I think if he wants to appeal, he could go do that as a private citizen... But I think when someone's convicted, it's time to resign." On March 26, Fortenberry issued a written statement to his colleagues in the House that said, "Due to the difficulties of my current circumstances, I can no longer effectively serve. I will resign from Congress effective March 31, 2022."

On June 28, 2022, federal judge Stanley Blumenfeld sentenced Fortenberry to two years' probation, 320 hours of community service and a $25,000 fine.

On December 26, 2023, a panel for the U.S. Court of Appeals for the Ninth Circuit overturned Fortenberry's conviction and sentence, ruling that he was tried in an improper venue, where his alleged crimes had not taken place. On May 9, 2024, federal prosecutors reissued the same criminal charges against Fortenberry, making a retrial more likely.

On January 29, 2025, the Justice Department filed to drop all charges against Fortenberry.

U.S. House of Representatives
Preceded by Doug Bereuter	Member of the U.S. House of Representatives from Nebraska's 1st congressional district 2005–2022	Succeeded by Mike Flood
U.S. order of precedence (ceremonial)
Preceded by Lee Terry as Former U.S. Representative	Order of precedence of the United States as Former U.S. Representative	Succeeded by Ed Perlmutter as Former U.S. Representative
