= Nebraska's 2nd congressional district =

U.S. House district for Nebraska

Coordinates: 41°15′N 96°00′W

- Interactive map of district boundaries since January 3, 2023
- Representative: Don Bacon; R–Papillion
- Distribution: 97.86% urban; 2.14% rural
- Population (2025): 689,494
- Median household income: $88,975
- Ethnicity: 67.8% White; 12.8% Hispanic; 9.8% Black; 4.4% Asian; 4.3% Two or more races; 0.9% other
- Cook PVI: D+3

Nebraska's 2nd congressional district is a congressional district in the U.S. state of Nebraska that encompasses the core of the Omaha–Council Bluffs metropolitan area. It includes all of Douglas County, which includes the state's largest city Omaha; it also includes Saunders County and areas of western Sarpy County. It has been represented in the United States House of Representatives since 2017 by Don Bacon, a member of the Republican Party.

With a Cook Partisan Voting Index (Cook PVI) rating of D+3, it is the most Democratic-leaning district in the United States with a Republican representative, and one of three congressional districts nationwide with a Democratic Cook PVI rating but a Republican representative; the others are New York's 17th congressional district and Pennsylvania's 1st congressional district, both with a Cook PVI of D+1. These three were also the only U.S. congressional districts that voted for Kamala Harris in the 2024 presidential election while also electing a Republican in the concurrent House of Representatives elections.

== History ==
While the rest of the state's electorate tends to be solidly Republican, the 2nd district is much more closely divided between the Republican and Democratic parties. In the 2010s, the district became known as a swing district; it was one of two districts with a margin of less than 5% in all elections held after the 2010 census. Since 2000, it has backed the electoral winner of the presidential election with the exceptions of 2012 and 2024.

Since 1992, Nebraska is one of only two states in the United States that distributes their electoral votes for president by both congressional district and statewide popular vote (the other being Maine). In the 2008 United States presidential election, Democratic presidential candidate Barack Obama targeted the district as a strategy of breaking a potential electoral-vote tie. He won the district's electoral vote by a margin of 3,325 votes over Republican John McCain, who won the state's other four electoral votes. Obama's victory in the 2nd district meant that Nebraska's electoral delegation was split for the first time ever, and the first Nebraskan electoral vote for a Democrat since 1964. However, he subsequently failed to win the district in 2012 against Mitt Romney. In 2014, longtime Representative Lee Terry, a Republican, was ousted by Democratic challenger Brad Ashford, one of only two Republican incumbents that cycle to lose their seat.

In 2016, Republican Donald Trump won only a plurality of the 2nd district over Democrat Hillary Clinton; he won only 2% over Clinton, a sharp reduction of Romney's seven-point advantage over Obama. Republican Don Bacon also bested one-term Democrat Brad Ashford to win the seat and has held the seat since. In 2020, Trump notably targeted the district in a fashion similar to Obama as Democrat Joe Biden polled at an advantage in the district. Trump's campaigning in the district drew criticism after rally attendees were left stranded in freezing temperatures due to transportation issues. Biden ultimately won in the district over Trump by six points, nearly matching Romney's margin over Obama. Precious McKesson cast the electoral vote, making her the first woman of color in the state to cast an Electoral college ballot. On August 17, 2024, Nebraska native and Minnesota Governor Tim Walz campaigned in the district to win it over once again. Democrats have nicknamed the district the 'blue dot' from its depiction on electoral maps surrounded by red states.

=== Demographics ===
According to the APM Research Lab's Voter Profile Tools (featuring the U.S. Census Bureau's 2019 American Community Survey), the district contained about 473,000 potential voters (citizens, age 18+). Of these, 80% are White, 9% Black, and 6% Latino. Immigrants make up 5% of the district's potential voters. The median income among households (with one or more potential voters) in the district is about $73,400, while 8% of households live below the poverty line. As for the educational attainment of potential voters in the district, 40% hold a bachelor's or higher degree.

=== Redistricting controversies ===
During redistricting in 2011, state lawmakers removed the city of Bellevue — an area with a large minority population — and Offutt Air Force Base from the district, and moved them to a district including Omaha's Republican-heavy suburbs in western Sarpy County. The move was criticized by Democrats as a gerrymander meant to dilute the urban vote due to its support of Obama in 2008.

Following its support of Joe Biden in the 2020 election, State Senator Lou Ann Linehan proposed a new map that would again dilute the Democratic vote by splitting the city of Omaha into two separate districts, and adding heavily Republican-leaning Sarpy and Saunders Counties. State Senator Justin Wayne proposed an alternative map that would restore the map to its pre-2011 movement by adding Bellevue back to the district and remove areas that lean Republican. Linehan's congressional redistricting plan passed the committee 5–4 on a party-line vote, but failed a cloture vote following a filibuster; both maps received bipartisan criticism for splitting Douglas and/or Sarpy counties. The legislature ultimately passed a map that kept Douglas County intact, while retaining rural parts in western Sarpy County and adding the rural Saunders County. The resulting maps have again been criticized as gerrymanders, and both Linehan's and the final maps have again been characterized as diluting urban voters.

== Recent election results from statewide races ==
Year	Office	Results
2008	President	Obama 50% - 48%
2012	President	Romney 53% - 47%
2016	President	Trump 48% - 46%
2018	Senate	Fischer 49% - 48%
2018	Governor	Krist 51% - 49%
2020	President	Biden 52% - 46%
2022	Governor	Pillen 48.2% - 48.1%
2024	President	Harris 51% - 47%
2024	Senate (Reg.)	Osborn 56% - 44%
2024	Senate (Spec.)	Ricketts 50.2% - 49.8%

== Composition ==
Nebraska's 2nd district includes the entirety of the following counties with the exception of Sarpy, which it shares with the 1st. Sarpy County communities within the 2nd include Beacon View, Gretna, Linoma Beach, Melia, Richfield, Springfield, and parts of Papillion.

#	County	Seat	Population
55	Douglas	Omaha	589,540
153	Sarpy (shared with 1st)	Papillion	199,886
155	Saunders	Wahoo	23,463

=== Cities and CDPs with 10,000 or more people ===
- Omaha – 483,335
- Papillion (shared with 1st) – 23,791

=== 2,500 – 10,000 people ===
- Gretna – 9,054
- Ralston – 6,401
- Wahoo – 4,987
- Ashland – 3,367
- Valley – 3,236

== List of members representing the district ==
Member	Party	Years of service	Cong ress	Electoral history	Counties
District established March 4, 1883
James Laird (Hastings)	Republican	March 4, 1883 – August 17, 1889	48th 49th 50th	Elected in 1882. Re-elected in 1884. Re-elected in 1886. Re-elected in 1888. Died.	1883–1893: Cass, Douglas, Gage, Johnson, Lancaster, Otoe, Pawnee, Richardson, Sarpy, Saunders, Washington
Gilbert L. Laws (McCook)	Republican	December 2, 1889 – March 3, 1891	51st	Elected to finish Laird's term. Retired.	1883–1893: Cass, Douglas, Gage, Johnson, Lancaster, Otoe, Pawnee, Richardson, Sarpy, Saunders, Washington
William A. McKeighan (Red Cloud)	Populist	March 4, 1891 – March 3, 1893	52nd	Elected in 1890. Redistricted to the 5th district.	1883–1893: Cass, Douglas, Gage, Johnson, Lancaster, Otoe, Pawnee, Richardson, Sarpy, Saunders, Washington
David Henry Mercer (Omaha)	Republican	March 4, 1893 – March 3, 1903	53rd 54th 55th 56th 57th	Elected in 1892. Re-elected in 1894. Re-elected in 1896. Re-elected in 1898. Re-elected in 1900. Lost re-election.	1893–1943: Douglas, Sarpy, Washington
Gilbert Hitchcock (Omaha)	Democratic	March 4, 1903 – March 3, 1905	58th	Elected in 1902. Lost re-election.	1893–1943: Douglas, Sarpy, Washington
John L. Kennedy (Omaha)	Republican	March 4, 1905 – March 3, 1907	59th	Elected in 1904. Lost re-election.	1893–1943: Douglas, Sarpy, Washington
Gilbert Hitchcock (Omaha)	Democratic	March 4, 1907 – March 3, 1911	60th 61st	Elected in 1906. Re-elected in 1908. Retired to run for U.S. senator.	1893–1943: Douglas, Sarpy, Washington
Charles O. Lobeck (Omaha)	Democratic	March 4, 1911 – March 3, 1919	62nd 63rd 64th 65th	Elected in 1910. Re-elected in 1912. Re-elected in 1914. Re-elected in 1916. Lost re-election.	1893–1943: Douglas, Sarpy, Washington
Albert W. Jefferis (Omaha)	Republican	March 4, 1919 – March 3, 1923	66th 67th	Elected in 1918. Re-elected in 1920. Retired to run for U.S. senator.	1893–1943: Douglas, Sarpy, Washington
Willis G. Sears (Omaha)	Republican	March 4, 1923 – March 3, 1931	68th 69th 70th 71st	Elected in 1922. Re-elected in 1924. Re-elected in 1926. Re-elected in 1928. Lost renomination.	1893–1943: Douglas, Sarpy, Washington
H. Malcolm Baldrige (Omaha)	Republican	March 4, 1931 – March 3, 1933	72nd	Elected in 1930. Lost re-election.	1893–1943: Douglas, Sarpy, Washington
Edward R. Burke (Omaha)	Democratic	March 4, 1933 – January 3, 1935	73rd	Elected in 1932. Retired to run for U.S. senator.	1893–1943: Douglas, Sarpy, Washington
Charles F. McLaughlin (Omaha)	Democratic	January 3, 1935 – January 3, 1943	74th 75th 76th 77th	Elected in 1934. Re-elected in 1936. Re-elected in 1938. Re-elected in 1940. Lost re-election.	1893–1943: Douglas, Sarpy, Washington
Howard Buffett (Omaha)	Republican	January 3, 1943 – January 3, 1949	78th 79th 80th	Elected in 1942. Re-elected in 1944. Re-elected in 1946. Lost re-election.	1943-1963: Cass, Douglas, Otoe, Sarpy, Washington
Eugene D. O'Sullivan (Omaha)	Democratic	January 3, 1949 – January 3, 1951	81st	Elected in 1948. Lost re-election.	1943-1963: Cass, Douglas, Otoe, Sarpy, Washington
Howard Buffett (Omaha)	Republican	January 3, 1951 – January 3, 1953	82nd	Elected in 1950. Retired.	1943-1963: Cass, Douglas, Otoe, Sarpy, Washington
Roman Hruska (Omaha)	Republican	January 3, 1953 – November 8, 1954	83rd	Elected in 1952. Resigned when elected U.S. Senator.	1943-1963: Cass, Douglas, Otoe, Sarpy, Washington
Jackson B. Chase (Omaha)	Republican	January 3, 1955 – January 3, 1957	84th	Elected in 1954. Retired.	1943-1963: Cass, Douglas, Otoe, Sarpy, Washington
Glenn Cunningham (Omaha)	Republican	January 3, 1957 – January 3, 1971	85th 86th 87th 88th 89th 90th 91st	Elected in 1956. Re-elected in 1958. Re-elected in 1960. Re-elected in 1962. Re-elected in 1964. Re-elected in 1966. Re-elected in 1968. Lost renomination.	1943-1963: Cass, Douglas, Otoe, Sarpy, Washington
Glenn Cunningham (Omaha)	Republican	January 3, 1957 – January 3, 1971	85th 86th 87th 88th 89th 90th 91st	Elected in 1956. Re-elected in 1958. Re-elected in 1960. Re-elected in 1962. Re-elected in 1964. Re-elected in 1966. Re-elected in 1968. Lost renomination.	1963-1969: Cass, Douglas, Sarpy, Washington
Glenn Cunningham (Omaha)	Republican	January 3, 1957 – January 3, 1971	85th 86th 87th 88th 89th 90th 91st	Elected in 1956. Re-elected in 1958. Re-elected in 1960. Re-elected in 1962. Re-elected in 1964. Re-elected in 1966. Re-elected in 1968. Lost renomination.	1969-1983: Burt, Cass, Douglas, Sarpy, Washington
John Y. McCollister (Omaha)	Republican	January 3, 1971 – January 3, 1977	92nd 93rd 94th	Elected in 1970. Re-elected in 1972. Re-elected in 1974. Retired to run for U.S. Senator.	1969-1983: Burt, Cass, Douglas, Sarpy, Washington
John J. Cavanaugh III (Omaha)	Democratic	January 3, 1977 – January 3, 1981	95th 96th	Elected in 1976. Re-elected in 1978. Retired.	1969-1983: Burt, Cass, Douglas, Sarpy, Washington
Hal Daub (Omaha)	Republican	January 3, 1981 – January 3, 1989	97th 98th 99th 100th	Elected in 1980. Re-elected in 1982. Re-elected in 1984. Re-elected in 1986. Retired to run for U.S. Senator.	1969-1983: Burt, Cass, Douglas, Sarpy, Washington
Hal Daub (Omaha)	Republican	January 3, 1981 – January 3, 1989	97th 98th 99th 100th	Elected in 1980. Re-elected in 1982. Re-elected in 1984. Re-elected in 1986. Retired to run for U.S. Senator.	1983-1993: Burt, Cass, Douglas, Sarpy, Washington
Peter Hoagland (Omaha)	Democratic	January 3, 1989 – January 3, 1995	101st 102nd 103rd	Elected in 1988. Re-elected in 1990. Re-elected in 1992. Lost re-election.	1983-1993: Burt, Cass, Douglas, Sarpy, Washington
Peter Hoagland (Omaha)	Democratic	January 3, 1989 – January 3, 1995	101st 102nd 103rd	Elected in 1988. Re-elected in 1990. Re-elected in 1992. Lost re-election.	1993-2003: Part of Cass, Douglas, Sarpy
Jon Christensen (Omaha)	Republican	January 3, 1995 – January 3, 1999	104th 105th	Elected in 1994. Re-elected in 1996. Retired to run for Governor.	1993-2003: Part of Cass, Douglas, Sarpy
Lee Terry (Omaha)	Republican	January 3, 1999 – January 3, 2015	106th 107th 108th 109th 110th 111th 112th 113th	Elected in 1998. Re-elected in 2000. Re-elected in 2002. Re-elected in 2004. Re-elected in 2006. Re-elected in 2008. Re-elected in 2010. Re-elected in 2012. Lost re-election.	1993-2003: Part of Cass, Douglas, Sarpy
Lee Terry (Omaha)	Republican	January 3, 1999 – January 3, 2015	106th 107th 108th 109th 110th 111th 112th 113th	Elected in 1998. Re-elected in 2000. Re-elected in 2002. Re-elected in 2004. Re-elected in 2006. Re-elected in 2008. Re-elected in 2010. Re-elected in 2012. Lost re-election.	2003–2013: Douglas, Part of Sarpy
Lee Terry (Omaha)	Republican	January 3, 1999 – January 3, 2015	106th 107th 108th 109th 110th 111th 112th 113th	Elected in 1998. Re-elected in 2000. Re-elected in 2002. Re-elected in 2004. Re-elected in 2006. Re-elected in 2008. Re-elected in 2010. Re-elected in 2012. Lost re-election.	2013–2023: Douglas, Part of Sarpy
Brad Ashford (Omaha)	Democratic	January 3, 2015 – January 3, 2017	114th	Elected in 2014. Lost re-election.	2013–2023: Douglas, Part of Sarpy
Don Bacon (Papillion)	Republican	January 3, 2017 – present	115th 116th 117th 118th 119th	Elected in 2016. Re-elected in 2018. Re-elected in 2020. Re-elected in 2022. Re-elected in 2024. Retiring at the end of term.	2013–2023: Douglas, Part of Sarpy
Don Bacon (Papillion)	Republican	January 3, 2017 – present	115th 116th 117th 118th 119th	Elected in 2016. Re-elected in 2018. Re-elected in 2020. Re-elected in 2022. Re-elected in 2024. Retiring at the end of term.	2023–present: Douglas, Part of Sarpy, Saunders
Denise Powell (Omaha)	Democratic	Assuming office on January 3, 2027		Elected in 2026.	2023–present: Douglas, Part of Sarpy, Saunders

== Election history ==
=== 2006 ===
2006 Nebraska's 2nd congressional district election
Party	Candidate	Votes	%	±%
Republican	Lee Terry (Incumbent)	99,475	54.7%	−6.4%
Democratic	Jim Esch	82,504	45.3%	+9.1%
Republican hold		Swing		
Turnout		181,979		

=== 2008 ===
2008 Nebraska's 2nd congressional district election
Party	Candidate	Votes	%	±%
Republican	Lee Terry (Incumbent)	142,473	51.9%	−2.8%
Democratic	Jim Esch	131,901	48.1%	+2.8%
Republican hold		Swing		
Turnout		274,374		

=== 2010 ===
2010 Nebraska's 2nd congressional district election
Party	Candidate	Votes	%	±%
Republican	Lee Terry (Incumbent)	93,840	60.8%	+8.9%
Democratic	Tom White	60,486	39.2%	−8.9%
Republican hold		Swing		
Turnout		154,326		

=== 2012 ===
2012 Nebraska's 2nd congressional district election
Party	Candidate	Votes	%	±%
Republican	Lee Terry (Incumbent)	133,964	50.8%	−10.0%
Democratic	John Ewing	129,767	49.2%	+10.0%
Republican hold		Swing		
Turnout		263,731		

=== 2014 ===
2014 Nebraska's 2nd congressional district election
Party	Candidate	Votes	%	±%
Democratic	Brad Ashford	83,872	49.0%	−0.2%
Republican	Lee Terry (Incumbent)	78,157	45.7%	−5.1%
Libertarian	Steven Laird	9,021	5.3%	+5.3%
Democratic gain from Republican		Swing		
Turnout		171,050		

=== 2016 ===
2016 Nebraska's 2nd congressional district election
Party	Candidate	Votes	%	±%
Republican	Don Bacon	141,066	48.9%	+3.2%
Democratic	Brad Ashford (Incumbent)	137,602	47.7%	−1.3%
Libertarian	Steven Laird	9,640	3.3%	−2.0%
Republican gain from Democratic		Swing		
Turnout		288,308		

=== 2018 ===
2018 Nebraska's 2nd congressional district election
Party	Candidate	Votes	%	±%
Republican	Don Bacon (Incumbent)	126,715	51.0%	+2.1%
Democratic	Kara Eastman	121,770	49.0%	+1.3%
Republican hold		Swing		
Turnout		248,485		

=== 2020 ===
2020 Nebraska's 2nd congressional district election
Party	Candidate	Votes	%	±%
Republican	Don Bacon (Incumbent)	171,071	50.8%	−0.2%
Democratic	Kara Eastman	155,706	46.2%	−2.8%
Libertarian	Tyler Schaeffer	10,185	3%	+3%
Republican hold		Swing		
Turnout		336,962		

=== 2022 ===
2022 Nebraska's 2nd congressional district election
Party	Candidate	Votes	%	±%
Republican	Don Bacon (incumbent)	112,663	51.33%	+0.56%
Democratic	Tony Vargas	106,807	48.67%	+2.46%
Total votes		219,470	100.00%	
Republican hold		Swing		

=== 2024 ===
2024 Nebraska's 2nd congressional district election
Party	Candidate	Votes	%	±%
Republican	Don Bacon (incumbent)	160,198	50.93%	−0.4%
Democratic	Tony Vargas	154,369	49.07%	+0.4%
Total votes		314,567	100.00%	
Republican hold		Swing		

== See also ==
- Nebraska's congressional districts
- Maine's 2nd congressional district
- List of United States congressional districts
