= Nebraska's 1st congressional district =

U.S. House district for Nebraska

Coordinates: 41°10′N 96°45′W

- Interactive map of district boundaries since January 3, 2023
- Representative: Mike Flood; R–Norfolk
- Distribution: 65.21% urban; 34.79% rural
- Population (2025): 675,253
- Median household income: $82,227
- Ethnicity: 77.9% White; 10.9% Hispanic; 4.1% Two or more races; 3.3% Black; 2.9% Asian; 0.9% other
- Cook PVI: R+6

Nebraska's 1st congressional district is a congressional district in the U.S. state of Nebraska that encompasses most of its eastern quarter, except for Omaha and some of its suburbs, which are part of the 2nd congressional district. It includes the state capital, Lincoln, and the cities of Bellevue, Fremont, and Norfolk. After the 2010 United States census, the 1st congressional district was changed to include an eastern section of Sarpy County; Dakota County was moved to the 3rd congressional district. After the 2020 United States Census, the 1st congressional district was changed to include the eastern section of Sarpy County, all of Cass, Lancaster, Seward, Butler, Dodge, Colfax, Platte, Cuming, Stanton, Madison Counties, and the northeast quarter of Polk County, including the city of Osceola.

Under the redistricting after the 2010 census, the Cook Partisan Voting Index (CPVI) for the 1st congressional district was R+11. In 2025, the CPVI adjusted the district's rating to R+6 as a result of redistricting.

== Recent election results from statewide races ==
Year	Office	Results
2008	President	McCain 54% - 44%
2012	President	Romney 58% - 42%
2016	President	Trump 56% - 38%
2018	Senate	Fischer 53% - 43%
2018	Governor	Ricketts 55% - 45%
2020	President	Trump 54% - 43%
2022	Governor	Pillen 56% - 41%
2024	President	Trump 55% - 43%
2024	Senate (Reg.)	Osborn 51% - 49%
2024	Senate (Spec.)	Ricketts 59% - 41%
2026	Senate	Osborn 53% - 43%
2026	Governor	Walz 47% - 45%

== Composition ==
Nebraska's 1st district includes the entirety of the following counties with the exception of Sarpy, which it shares with the 2nd, and Polk, which it shares with the 3rd. Sarpy County communities in the 1st district include Bellevue, Chalco, La Platte, La Vista, Offutt AFB, and most of Papillion. Polk County communities include Osceola and Shelby.

#	County	Seat	Population
23	Butler	David City	8,459
25	Cass	Plattsmouth	27,446
37	Colfax	Schuyler	10,566
39	Cuming	West Point	8,918
53	Dodge	Fremont	37,187
109	Lancaster	Lincoln	326,716
119	Madison	Madison	35,627
141	Platte	Columbus	34,609
143	Polk (shared with 3rd)	Osceola	5,228
153	Sarpy (shared with 2nd)	Papillion	199,886
159	Seward	Seward	17,671
167	Stanton	Stanton	5,856

=== Cities and CDPs with 10,000 or more people ===
- Lincoln – 294,757
- Bellevue – 64,176
- Fremont – 27,602
- Norfolk – 26,147
- Columbus – 24,464
- Papillion (shared with 2nd) – 24,159
- La Vista – 16,746
- Chalco – 11,064

=== 2,500 – 10,000 people ===
- Seward – 7,672
- Plattsmouth – 6,808
- Schuyler – 6,529
- Offutt Air Force Base – 5,363
- Waverly – 4,458
- West Point – 3,458
- Hickman – 3,161
- David City – 3,024

== List of members representing the district ==
Member (District Home)	Party	Term	Cong ress	Electoral history
District established March 4, 1883
Archibald J. Weaver (Falls City)	Republican	March 4, 1883 – March 3, 1887	48th 49th	Elected in 1882. Reelected in 1884. Retired.
John A. McShane (Omaha)	Democratic	March 4, 1887 – March 3, 1889	50th	Elected in 1886. Retired to run for U.S. senator.
William James Connell (Omaha)	Republican	March 4, 1889 – March 3, 1891	51st	Elected in 1888. Lost reelection.
William Jennings Bryan (Lincoln)	Democratic	March 4, 1891 – March 3, 1895	52nd 53rd	Elected in 1890. Reelected in 1892. Retired to run for U.S. senator.
Jesse B. Strode (Lincoln)	Republican	March 4, 1895 – March 3, 1899	54th 55th	Elected in 1894. Reelected in 1896. Retired.
Elmer Burkett (Lincoln)	Republican	March 4, 1899 – March 3, 1905	56th 57th 58th	Elected in 1898. Reelected in 1900. Reelected in 1902. Reelected in 1904. Resigned when elected U.S. Senator.
Vacant		March 4, 1905 – July 18, 1905	59th	
Ernest M. Pollard (Nehawka)	Republican	July 18, 1905 – March 3, 1909	59th 60th	Elected to finish Burkett's term. Reelected in 1906. Lost reelection.
John A. Maguire (Lincoln)	Democratic	March 4, 1909 – March 3, 1915	61st 62nd 63rd	Elected in 1908. Reelected in 1910. Reelected in 1912. Lost reelection.
C. Frank Reavis (Falls City)	Republican	March 4, 1915 – June 3, 1922	64th 65th 66th 67th	Elected in 1914. Reelected in 1916. Reelected in 1918. Reelected in 1920. Resigned to become special assistant to the U.S. Attorney General.
Vacant		June 3, 1922 – November 7, 1922	67th	
Roy H. Thorpe (Lincoln)	Republican	November 7, 1922 – March 3, 1923	67th	Elected to finish Reavis's term. Retired.
John H. Morehead (Falls City)	Democratic	March 4, 1923 – January 3, 1935	68th 69th 70th 71st 72nd 73rd	Elected in 1922. Reelected in 1924. Reelected in 1926. Reelected in 1928. Reelected in 1930. Reelected in 1932. Retired.
Henry C. Luckey (Lincoln)	Democratic	January 3, 1935 – January 3, 1939	74th 75th	Elected in 1934. Re-elected in 1936. Lost reelection.
George H. Heinke (Nebraska City)	Republican	January 3, 1939 – January 2, 1940	76th	Elected in 1938. Died.
Vacant		January 2, 1940 – April 19, 1940	76th	
John Hyde Sweet (Nebraska City)	Republican	April 19, 1940 – January 3, 1941	76th	Elected to finish Heinke's term. Retired.
Oren S. Copeland (Lincoln)	Republican	January 3, 1941 – January 3, 1943	77th	Elected in 1940. Lost renomination.
Carl Curtis (Minden)	Republican	January 3, 1943 – December 31, 1954	78th 79th 80th 81st 82nd 83rd	Redistricted from the 4th district and reelected in 1942. Reelected in 1944. Reelected in 1946. Reelected in 1948. Reelected in 1950. Reelected in 1952. Resigned when appointed U.S. Senator.
Vacant		December 31, 1954 – January 3, 1955	83rd	
Phil Weaver (Falls City)	Republican	January 3, 1955 – January 3, 1963	84th 85th 86th 87th	Elected in 1954. Reelected in 1956. Reelected in 1958. Reelected in 1960. Lost renomination.
Ralph F. Beermann (Dakota City)	Republican	January 3, 1963 – January 3, 1965	88th	Redistricted from the 3rd district and reelected in 1962. Lost reelection.
Clair A. Callan (Odell)	Democratic	January 3, 1965 – January 3, 1967	89th	Elected in 1964. Lost re-election.
Robert V. Denney (Fairbury)	Republican	January 3, 1967 – January 3, 1971	90th 91st	Elected in 1966. Reelected in 1968. Retired.
Charles Thone (Lincoln)	Republican	January 3, 1971 – January 3, 1979	92nd 93rd 94th 95th	Elected in 1970. Reelected in 1972. Reelected in 1974. Reelected in 1976. Retired to run for governor of Nebraska.
Doug Bereuter (Lincoln)	Republican	January 3, 1979 – August 31, 2004	96th 97th 98th 99th 100th 101st 102nd 103rd 104th 105th 106th 107th 108th	Elected in 1978. Reelected in 1980. Reelected in 1982. Reelected in 1984. Reelected in 1986. Reelected in 1988. Reelected in 1990. Reelected in 1992. Reelected in 1994. Reelected in 1996. Reelected in 1998. Reelected in 2000. Reelected in 2002. Resigned to become president of The Asia Foundation.
Vacant		August 31, 2004 – January 3, 2005	108th	
Jeff Fortenberry (Lincoln)	Republican	January 3, 2005 – March 31, 2022	109th 110th 111th 112th 113th 114th 115th 116th 117th	Elected in 2004. Reelected in 2006. Reelected in 2008. Reelected in 2010. Reelected in 2012. Reelected in 2014. Reelected in 2016. Reelected in 2018. Reelected in 2020. Resigned due to criminal conviction.
Vacant		March 31, 2022 – July 12, 2022	117th	
Mike Flood (Norfolk)	Republican	July 12, 2022 – present	117th 118th 119th	Elected to finish Fortenberry's term. Reelected in 2022. Reelected in 2024. Reelected in 2026.

== Election history ==
=== 2002 ===
2002 Nebraska's 1st congressional district election
Party	Candidate	Votes	%	±%
Republican	Doug Bereuter (incumbent)	133,013	85.35%	+19.10
Libertarian	Robert Eckerson	22,831	14.65%	+12.03
Total votes		155,844	100.0%	
Republican hold				

=== 2004 ===
2004 Nebraska's 1st congressional district election
Party	Candidate	Votes	%	±%
Republican	Jeff Fortenberry	143,756	54.23%	–31.12
Democratic	Matt Connealy	113,971	43.00%	N/A
Green	Steve Larrick	7,345	2.77%	N/A
Total votes		265,072	100.0%	
Republican hold				

=== 2006 ===
2006 Nebraska's 1st congressional district election
Party	Candidate	Votes	%	±%
Republican	Jeff Fortenberry (incumbent)	121,015	58.36%	+4.13
Democratic	Maxine Moul	86,360	41.64%	–1.36
Total votes		207,375	100.0%	
Republican hold				

=== 2008 ===
2008 Nebraska's 1st congressional district election
Party	Candidate	Votes	%	±%
Republican	Jeff Fortenberry (incumbent)	184,923	70.36%	+12.00
Democratic	Max Yashirin	77,897	29.64%	–12.00
Total votes		262,820	100.0%	
Republican hold				

=== 2010 ===
2010 Nebraska's 1st congressional district election
Party	Candidate	Votes	%	±%
Republican	Jeff Fortenberry (incumbent)	116,871	71.27%	+0.91
Democratic	Ivy Harper	47,106	28.73%	–0.91
Total votes		163,977	100.0%	
Republican hold				

=== 2012 ===
2012 Nebraska's 1st congressional district election
Party	Candidate	Votes	%	±%
Republican	Jeff Fortenberry (incumbent)	174,889	68.29%	–2.98
Democratic	Korey L. Reiman	81,206	31.71%	+2.98
Total votes		256,095	100.0%	
Republican hold				

=== 2014 ===
2014 Nebraska's 1st congressional district election
Party	Candidate	Votes	%	±%
Republican	Jeff Fortenberry (incumbent)	123,219	68.82%	+0.53
Democratic	Dennis Crawford	55,838	31.18%	–0.53
Total votes		179,057	100.0%	
Republican hold				

=== 2016 ===
2016 Nebraska's 1st congressional district election
Party	Candidate	Votes	%	±%
Republican	Jeff Fortenberry (incumbent)	189,771	69.45%	+0.63
Democratic	Daniel M. Wik	83,467	30.55%	–0.63
Total votes		273,238	100.0%	
Republican hold				

=== 2018 ===
2018 Nebraska's 1st congressional district election
Party	Candidate	Votes	%	±%
Republican	Jeff Fortenberry (incumbent)	141,172	60.36%	–9.09
Democratic	Jessica McClure	93,069	39.64%	+9.09
Total votes		234,241	100.0%	
Republican hold				

=== 2020 ===
2020 Nebraska's 1st congressional district election
Party	Candidate	Votes	%	±%
Republican	Jeff Fortenberry (incumbent)	189,006	59.52%	–0.84
Democratic	Kate Bolz	119,622	37.67%	–1.97
Libertarian	Dennis B. Grace	8,938	2.81%	N/A
Total votes		317,566	100.0	
Republican hold				

=== 2022 (special) ===
2022 Nebraska's 1st congressional district special election
Party	Candidate	Votes	%	±%
Republican	Mike Flood	61,017	52.69%	–6.83
Democratic	Patty Pansing Brooks	54,783	47.31%	+9.64
Total votes		115,800	100.0	
Republican hold				

=== 2022 ===
2022 Nebraska's 1st congressional district election
Party	Candidate	Votes	%	±%
Republican	Mike Flood (incumbent)	129,236	57.91%	+5.22
Democratic	Patty Pansing Brooks	93,929	42.09%	−5.22
Total votes		223,165	100.00%	
Republican hold				

=== 2024 ===
2024 Nebraska's 1st congressional district election
Party	Candidate	Votes	%	±%
Republican	Mike Flood (incumbent)	187,559	60.10%	+2.19
Democratic	Carol Blood	124,498	39.90%	−2.19
Total votes		312,057	100.00%	
Republican hold				

== Historical district boundaries ==
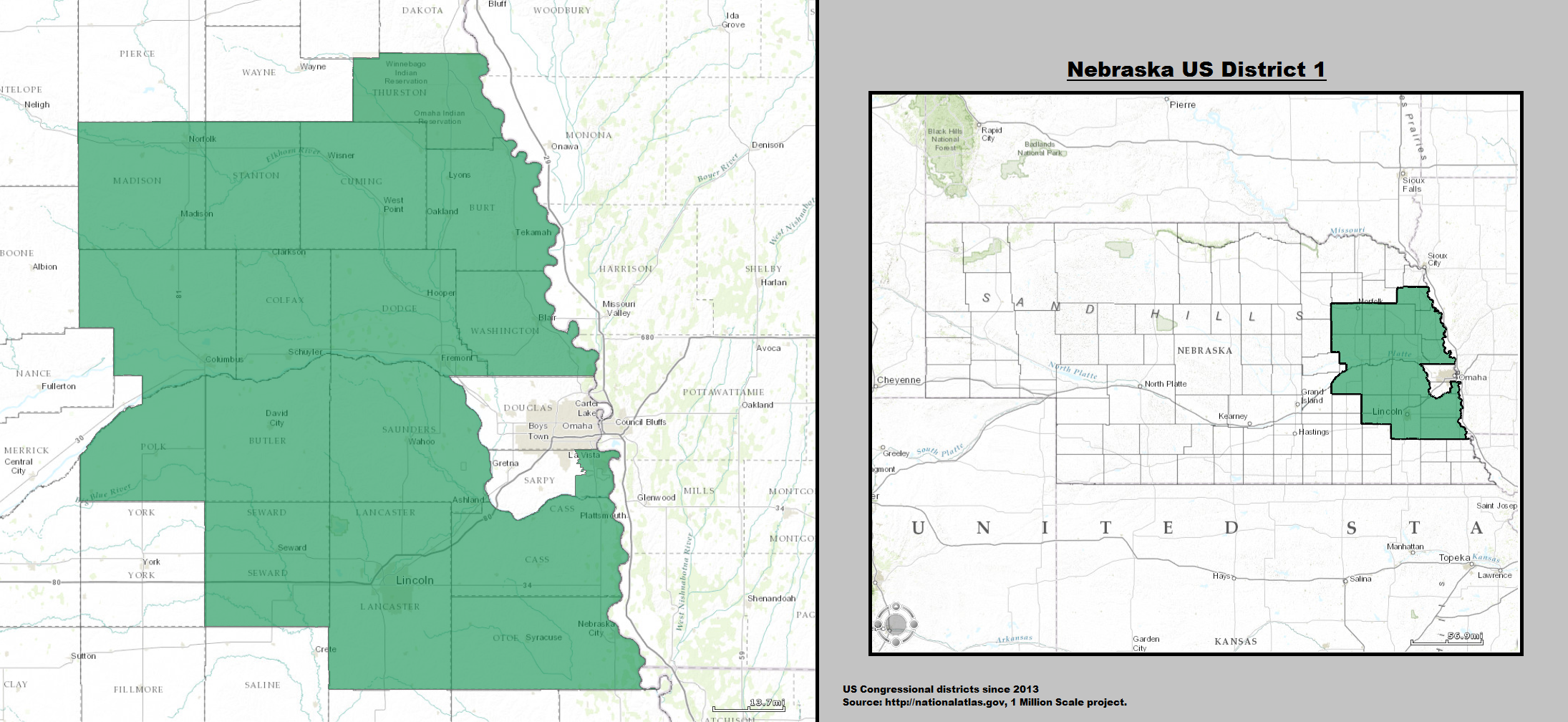
2013–2023

== See also ==
- Nebraska's congressional districts
- List of United States congressional districts
