= 2008 United States House of Representatives elections in Nebraska =

- November 4, 2008

All 3 Nebraska seats to the United States House of Representatives
	Majority party	Minority party
Party	Republican	Democratic
Last election	3	0
Seats won	3	0
Seat change	Steady	Steady
Popular vote	510,513	264,885
Percentage	65.84%	34.16%
Swing	▲10.78%	▼9.78%

Republican
50–60%
60–70%
70–80%
80–90%
>90%
Democratic
50–60%
60–70%
70–80%
80–90%
>90%
Tie/No Data

The 2008 congressional elections in Nebraska were held on November 4, 2008, to determine who would represent the state of Nebraska in the United States House of Representatives, coinciding with the presidential and senatorial elections. Representatives are elected for two-year terms; those elected will serve in the 111th Congress from January 3, 2009, until January 3, 2011.

Nebraska has three seats in the House, apportioned according to the 2000 United States census. Its 2007-2008 congressional delegation consisted of three Republicans. No district changed hands, although CQ Politics had forecasted district 2 to be at some risk for the incumbent party. The party primary elections were held May 13.

== Overview ==
United States House of Representatives elections in Nebraska, 2008
Party	Votes	Percentage	Seats	+/–
Republican	510,513	65.84%	3	—
Democratic	264,885	34.16%	0	—
Totals	775,398	100.00%	3	—

=== Match-up summary ===
District	Incumbent	2008 Status	Democratic	Republican	Other Party
1	Jeff Fortenberry	Re-election	Max Yashirin	Jeff Fortenberry	
2	Lee Terry	Re-election	Jim Esch	Lee Terry	
3	Adrian Smith	Re-election	Jay C. Stoddard	Adrian Smith	

== District 1 ==
2006 Nebraska's 1st congressional district election
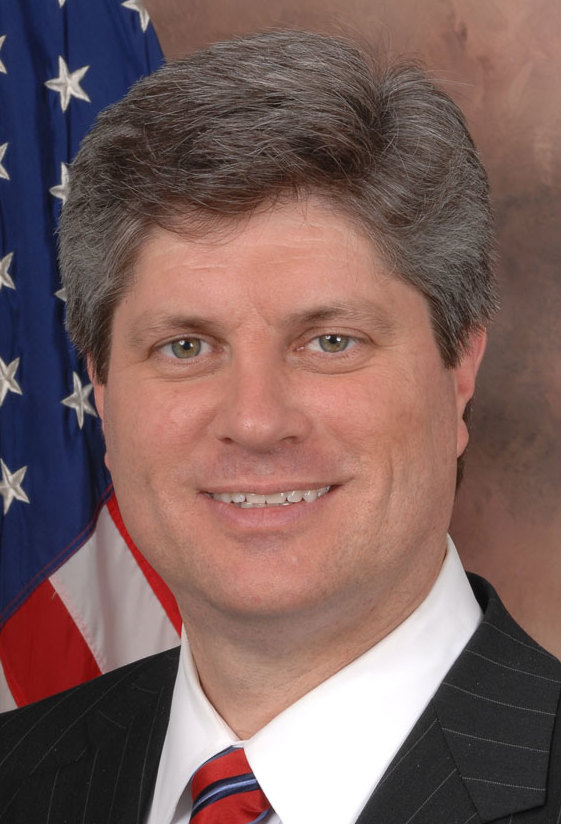

Nominee	Jeff Fortenberry	Max Yashirin
Party	Republican	Democratic
Popular vote	184,923	77,897
Percentage	70.4%	29.6%
- County results Fortenberry: 60–70% 70–80% 80–90%
U.S. Representative before election
Jeff Fortenberry
Republican
Elected U.S. Representative
Jeff Fortenberry
Republican

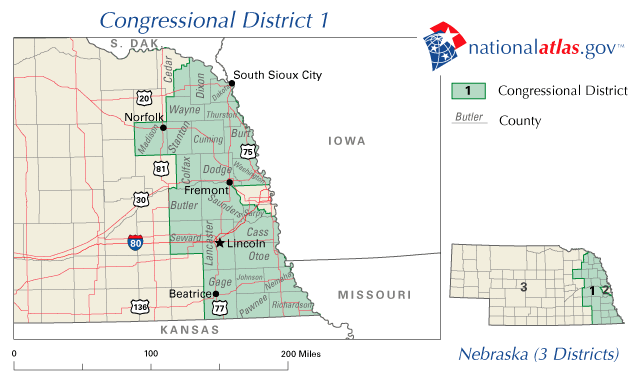

This district encompassed most of the eastern quarter of the state. Republican incumbent Jeff Fortenberry (campaign website) won re-election. Max Yashirin (campaign website) was the Democratic nominee.

- Race ranking and details from CQ Politics
- Campaign contributions from OpenSecrets

=== Predictions ===
Source	Ranking	As of
The Cook Political Report	Safe R	November 6, 2008
Rothenberg	Safe R	November 2, 2008
Sabato's Crystal Ball	Safe R	November 6, 2008
Real Clear Politics	Safe R	November 7, 2008
CQ Politics	Safe R	November 6, 2008

=== Results ===
Nebraska's 1st congressional district election, 2008
Party	Candidate	Votes	%
Republican	Jeff Fortenberry (inc.)	184,923	70.36
Democratic	Max Yashirin	77,897	29.64
Total votes		262,820	100.00
Republican hold			

== District 2 ==
2008 Nebraska's 2nd congressional district election
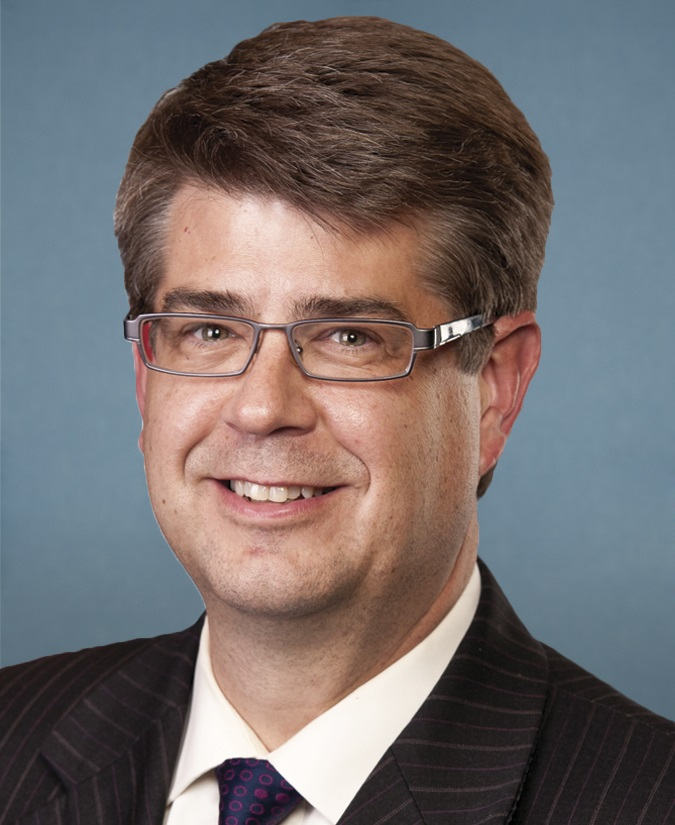

Nominee	Lee Terry	Jim Esch
Party	Republican	Democratic
Popular vote	142,473	131,901
Percentage	51.9%	48.1%
U.S. Representative before election
Lee Terry (inc.)
Republican
Elected U.S. Representative
Lee Terry
Republican

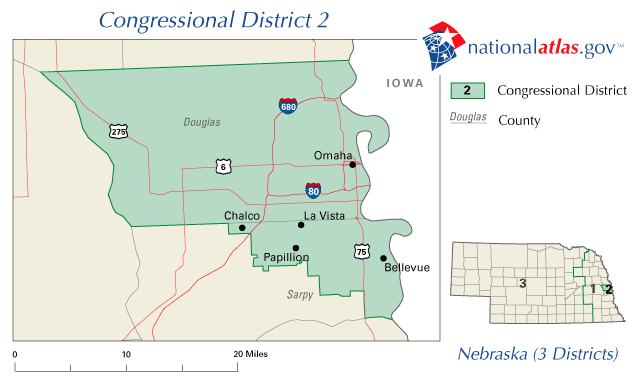

This district encompassed the core of the Omaha metropolitan area. Republican incumbent Lee Terry won against Democratic nominee Jim Esch, an Omaha businessman. While campaigning, Terry had pledged that he would serve no more than three two year terms. However, he announced just months later that he would break the pledge. This garnered some bad press, but he won three more terms with little trouble. However, in 2006, he won by 55% to 45%, much less than expected in a solidly Republican district. His Democratic opponent in that race, Jim Esch, faced him again in 2008.

Lee Terry (R) - Incumbent (campaign website)
Jim Esch (D) (campaign website)

- Race ranking and details from CQ Politics
- Campaign contributions from OpenSecrets

=== Predictions ===
Source	Ranking	As of
The Cook Political Report	Tossup	November 6, 2008
Rothenberg	Tilt D (flip)	November 2, 2008
Sabato's Crystal Ball	Lean R	November 6, 2008
Real Clear Politics	Safe R	November 7, 2008
CQ Politics	Lean R	November 6, 2008

=== Results ===
Nebraska's 2nd congressional district election, 2008
Party	Candidate	Votes	%
Republican	Lee Terry (inc.)	142,473	51.93
Democratic	Jim Esch	131,901	48.07
Total votes		274,374	100.00
Republican hold			

== District 3 ==
2008 Nebraska's 3rd congressional district election
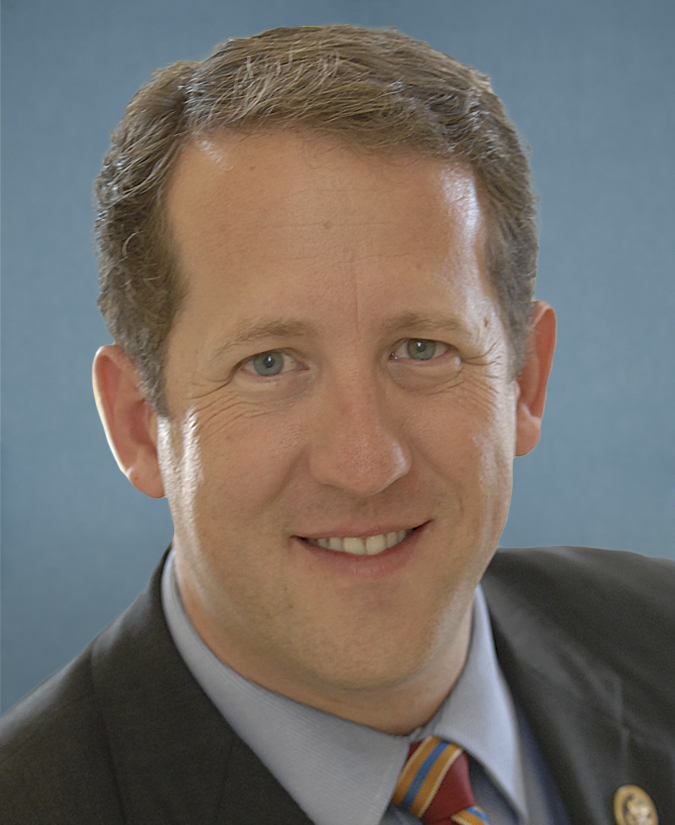

Nominee	Adrian Smith	Jay C. Stoddard
Party	Republican	Democratic
Popular vote	183,117	55,087
Percentage	76.9%	23.1%
- County results Smith: 50–60% 60–70% 70–80% 80–90% 90–100%
U.S. Representative before election
Adrian Smith (inc.)
Republican
Elected U.S. Representative
Adrian Smith
Republican

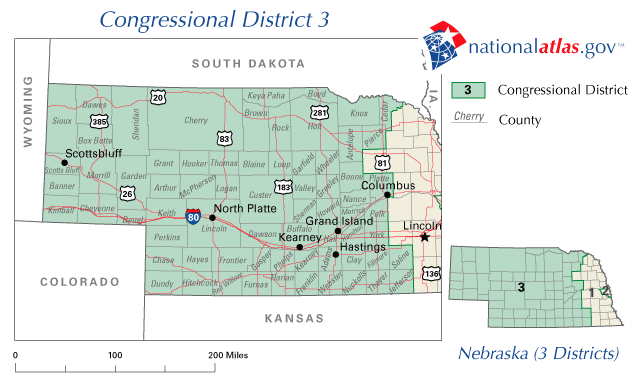

This district encompassed the western three-fourths of the state. Republican incumbent Adrian Smith (campaign website) won against Democratic nominee Jay C. Stoddard (campaign website).

- Race ranking and details from CQ Politics
- Campaign contributions from OpenSecrets

=== Predictions ===
Source	Ranking	As of
The Cook Political Report	Safe R	November 6, 2008
Rothenberg	Safe R	November 2, 2008
Sabato's Crystal Ball	Safe R	November 6, 2008
Real Clear Politics	Safe R	November 7, 2008
CQ Politics	Safe R	November 6, 2008

=== Results ===
Nebraska's 3rd congressional district election, 2008
Party	Candidate	Votes	%
Republican	Adrian Smith (inc.)	183,117	76.87
Democratic	Jay C. Stoddard	55,087	23.13
Total votes		238,204	100.00
Republican hold			

Preceded by 2006 elections	United States House elections in Nebraska; 2008	Succeeded by 2010 elections
