= 2010 United States House of Representatives elections in Nebraska =

- November 2, 2010

All 3 Nebraska seats to the United States House of Representatives
	Majority party	Minority party
Party	Republican	Democratic
Last election	3	0
Seats won	3	0
Seat change	Steady	Steady
Popular vote	327,986	137,524
Percentage	67.55%	28.32%
Swing	▲1.71%	▼5.84%
- Republican 40–50% 50–60% 60–70% 70–80% 80–90%

The 2010 congressional elections in Nebraska were held on November 2, 2010, to determine who will represent the state of Nebraska in the United States House of Representatives. Representatives are elected for two-year terms; those elected served in the 112th Congress from January 3, 2011, until January 3, 2013.

Nebraska has three seats in the House, apportioned according to the 2000 United States census. Its 2008-2009 congressional delegation consisted of three Republicans: Jeff Fortenberry in district 1, Lee Terry in district 2 and Adrian Smith in district 3. All three ran for reelection.

== Overview ==
United States House of Representatives elections in Nebraska, 2010
Party	Votes	Percentage	Seats	+/–
Republican	327,986	67.55%	3	—
Democratic	137,524	28.32%	0	—
Independents	20,036	4.13%	0	—
Totals	485,546	100.00%	3	—

=== By district ===
Results of the 2010 United States House of Representatives elections in Nebraska by district:

District	Republican		Democratic		Others		Total		Result
District	Votes	%	Votes	%	Votes	%	Votes	%	Result
District 1	116,871	71.27%	47,106	28.73%	0	0.00%	163,977	100%	Republican hold
District 2	93,840	60.81%	60,486	39.19%	0	0.00%	154,326	100%	Republican hold
District 3	117,275	70.12%	29,932	17.90%	20,036	11.98%	167,243	100%	Republican hold
Total	327,986	67.55%	137,524	28.32%	20,036	4.13%	485,546	100%	

== District 1 ==
2010 Nebraska's 1st congressional district election
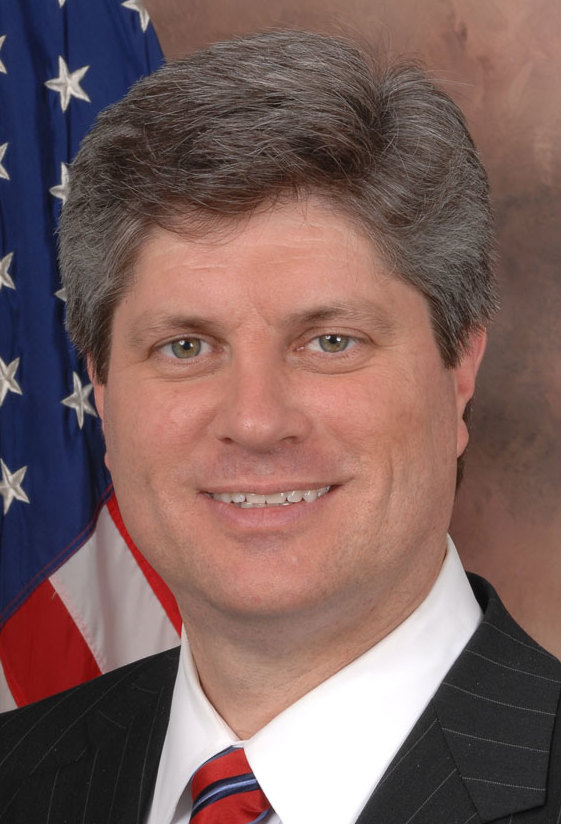

Nominee	Jeff Fortenberry	Ivy Harper
Party	Republican	Democratic
Popular vote	116,871	47,106
Percentage	71.3%	28.7%
- County results Fortenberry: 60–70% 70–80% 80–90%
U.S. Representative before election
Jeff Fortenberry (inc.)
Republican
Elected U.S. Representative
Jeff Fortenberry
Republican

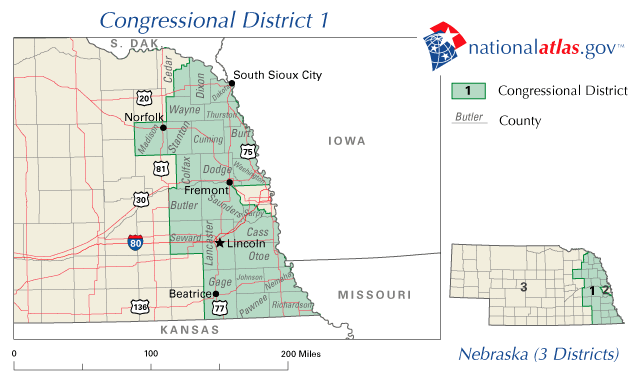

In this solidly conservative district based in eastern Nebraska, including some Omaha suburbs and the city of Lincoln, incumbent Republican Congressman Jeff Fortenberry ran for a fourth term. Congressman Fortenberry was opposed by Democrat Ivy Harper, a journalist and a legislative assistant to former Congressman John Cavanaugh. Harper did not stand much chance in this district, and Fortenberry was overwhelmingly re-elected.

=== Predictions ===
Source	Ranking	As of
The Cook Political Report	Safe R	November 1, 2010
Rothenberg	Safe R	November 1, 2010
Sabato's Crystal Ball	Safe R	November 1, 2010
RCP	Safe R	November 1, 2010
CQ Politics	Safe R	October 28, 2010
New York Times	Safe R	November 1, 2010
FiveThirtyEight	Safe R	November 1, 2010

=== Results ===
Nebraska's 1st congressional district election, 2010
Party	Candidate	Votes	%
Republican	Jeff Fortenberry (inc.)	116,871	71.27
Democratic	Ivy Harper	47,106	28.73
Total votes		163,977	100.00
Republican hold			

== District 2 ==
2010 Nebraska's 2nd congressional district election
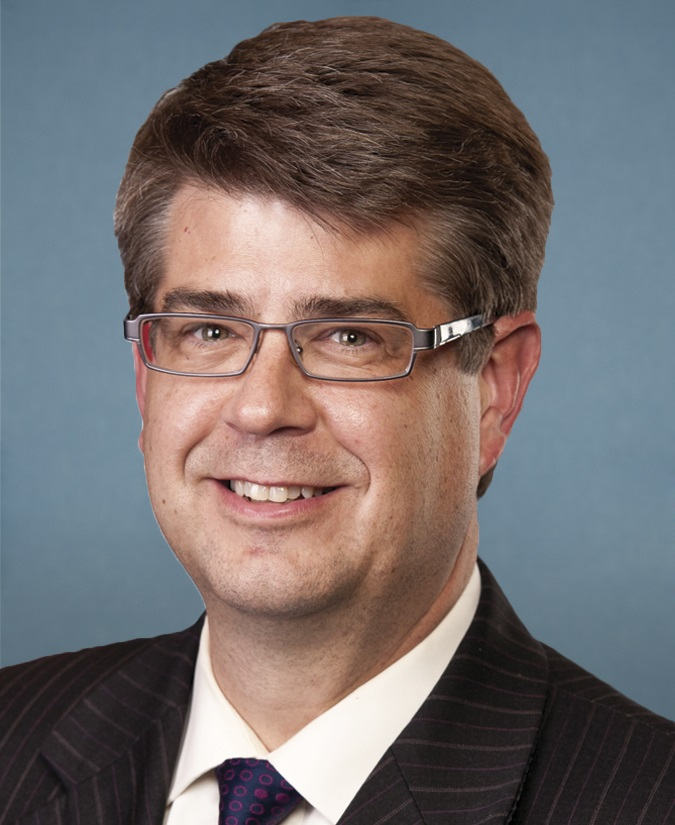

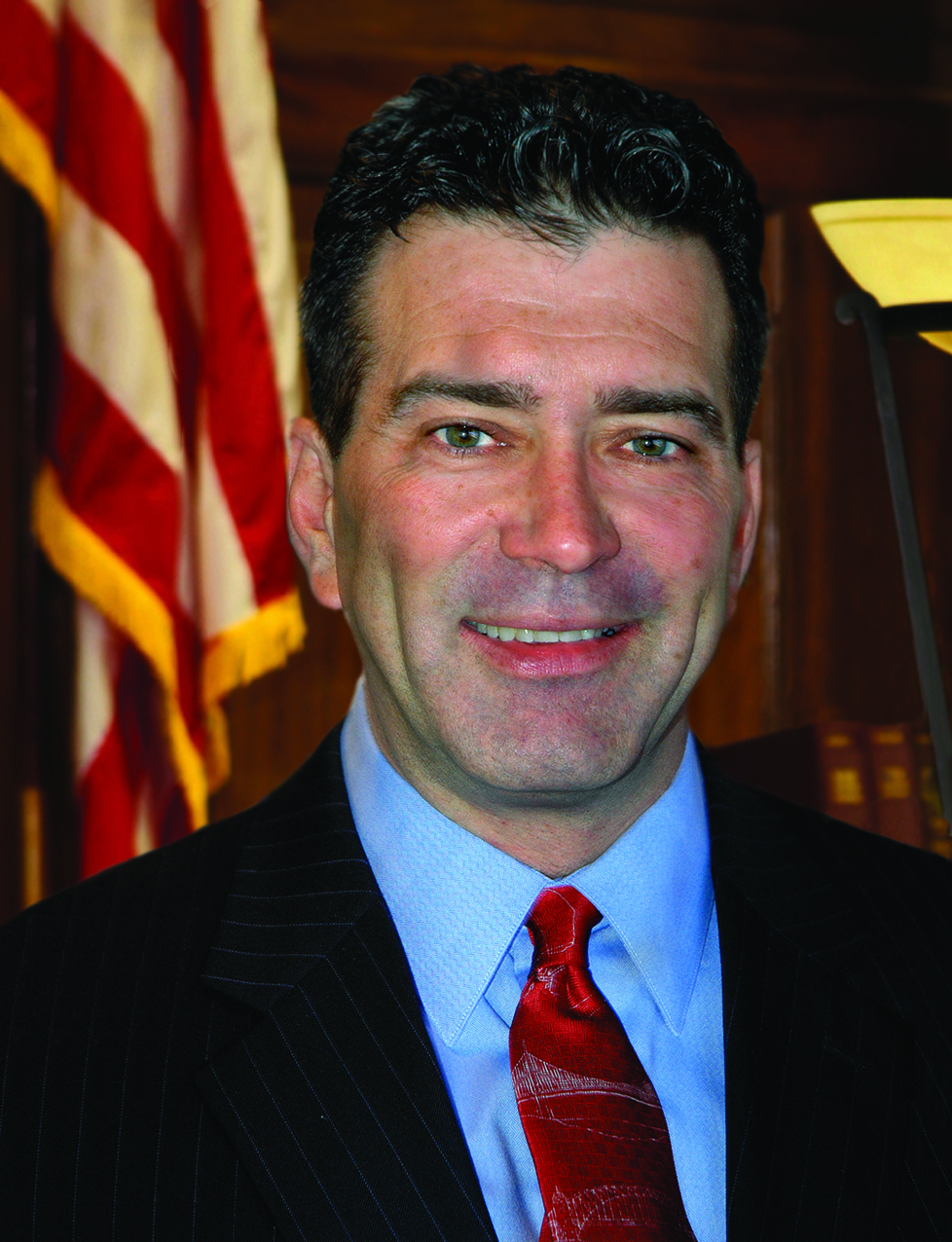
Nominee	Lee Terry	Tom White
Party	Republican	Democratic
Popular vote	93,840	60,486
Percentage	60.8%	39.2%
- County results Terry: 50–60% 60–70%
U.S. Representative before election
Lee Terry (inc.)
Republican
Elected U.S. Representative
Lee Terry
Republican

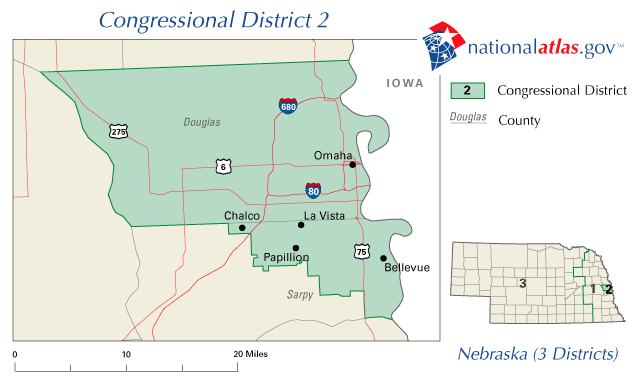

This conservative-leaning district is solely based in metropolitan Omaha and has been represented by incumbent Republican Congressman Lee Terry since he was first elected in 1998. Congressman Terry faced a tough bid for re-election in 2008 from Democrat Jim Esch, but Esch declined to run for Congress a third time in 2010. Instead, State Senator Tom White emerged as the Democratic nominee. Though polls indicated the race to be close and Democrats saw the 2nd district as one of their few pick-up opportunities, Congressman Terry was ultimately re-elected by a wide margin on election day.

=== Polling ===
Poll Source	Dates Administered	Lee Terry (R)	Tom White (D)	Undecided
Wiese Research Associates (Registered Voters)	October 17–21, 2010	44%	39%	12%
Wiese Research Associates (Likely Voters)	October 17–21, 2010	48%	40%	12%

==== Predictions ====
Source	Ranking	As of
The Cook Political Report	Likely R	November 1, 2010
Rothenberg	Safe R	November 1, 2010
Sabato's Crystal Ball	Likely R	November 1, 2010
RCP	Likely R	November 1, 2010
CQ Politics	Safe R	October 28, 2010
New York Times	Lean R	November 1, 2010
FiveThirtyEight	Safe R	November 1, 2010

=== Results ===
Nebraska's 2nd congressional district election, 2010
Party	Candidate	Votes	%
Republican	Lee Terry (inc.)	93,840	60.81
Democratic	Tom White	60,486	39.19
Total votes		154,326	100.00
Republican hold			

== District 3 ==
2010 Nebraska's 3rd congressional district election
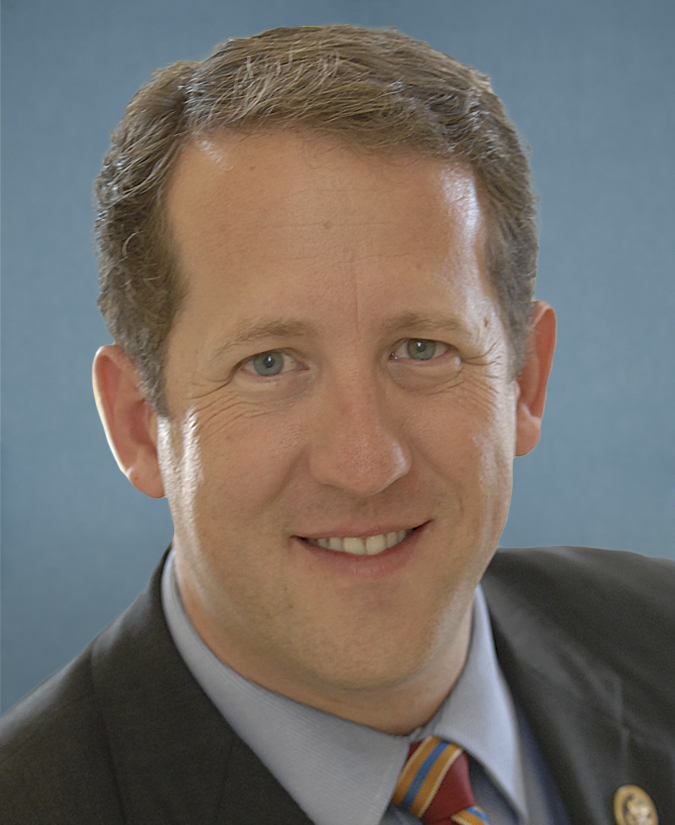

Nominee	Adrian Smith	Rebekah Davis	Dan Hill
Party	Republican	Democratic	Independent
Popular vote	117,275	29,932	20,036
Percentage	70.1%	17.9%	12.0%
- County results Smith: 40–50% 50–60% 60–70% 70–80% 80–90%
U.S. Representative before election
Adrian Smith (inc.)
Republican
Elected U.S. Representative
Adrian Smith
Republican

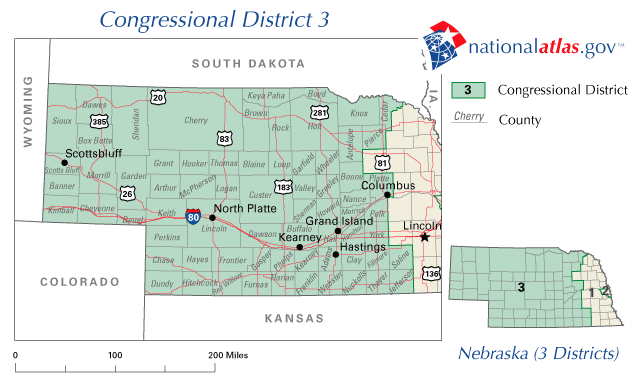

This congressional district, which constitutes nearly 85% of Nebraska's land mass, is one of the most conservative districts in the country. Though incumbent Congressman Adrian Smith, a Republican, was elected to his first term in 2006 by a shockingly small ten-point margin of victory, he has enjoyed considerable luck since. This year, Congressman Smith faced Democratic nominee Rebekah Davis and independent candidate Dan Hill. As expected, Smith trounced both Davis and Hill to win a third term to Congress.

=== Predictions ===
Source	Ranking	As of
The Cook Political Report	Safe R	November 1, 2010
Rothenberg	Safe R	November 1, 2010
Sabato's Crystal Ball	Safe R	November 1, 2010
RCP	Safe R	November 1, 2010
CQ Politics	Safe R	October 28, 2010
New York Times	Safe R	November 1, 2010
FiveThirtyEight	Safe R	November 1, 2010

=== Results ===
Nebraska's 3rd congressional district election, 2010
Party	Candidate	Votes	%
Republican	Adrian Smith (inc.)	117,275	70.12
Democratic	Rebekah Davis	29,932	17.90
Independent	Dan Hill	20,036	11.98
Total votes		167,243	100.00
Republican hold			
