= Nebraska's congressional districts =

U.S. House districts in the State of Nebraska

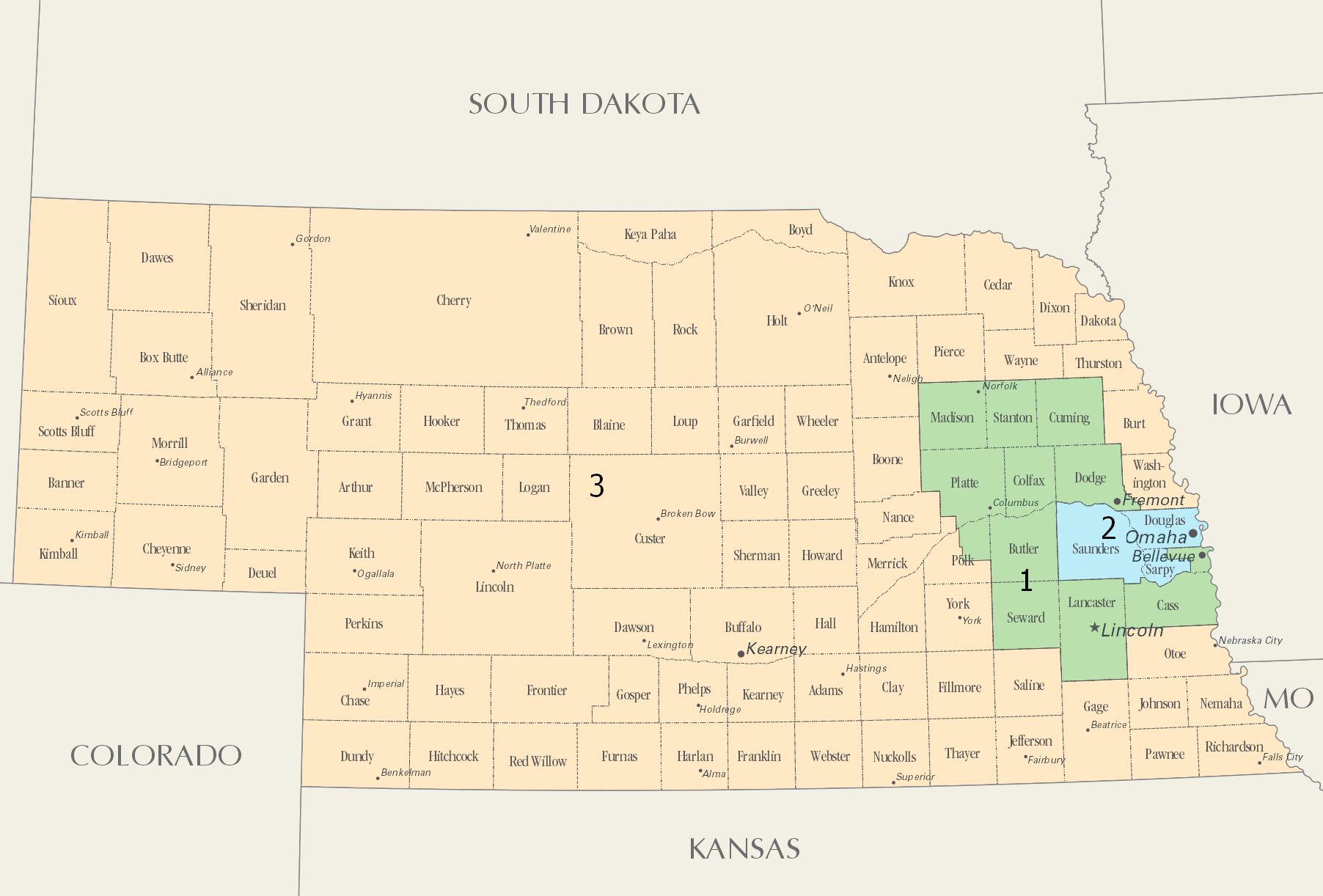
Map of Nebraska's congressional districts since 2023 Interactive map version

Nebraska has three congressional districts due to its population, each of which elects a member to the United States House of Representatives.

Unlike every other U.S. state except for Maine, Nebraska apportions its Electoral College votes according to congressional district, making each district its own separate battleground in presidential elections.

== Current districts and representatives ==
This is a list of United States representatives from Nebraska, district boundaries, and the district political ratings according to the CPVI. The delegation has a total of three members, all Republicans.

Current U.S. representatives from Nebraska
District	Member (Residence)	Party	Incumbent since	CPVI (2025)	District map
1st	Mike Flood (Norfolk)	Republican	June 28, 2022	R+6	
2nd	Don Bacon (Papillion)	Republican	January 3, 2017	D+3	
3rd	Adrian Smith (Gering)	Republican	January 3, 2007	R+27	

== Historical and present district boundaries ==
Table of United States congressional district boundary maps in the State of Nebraska, presented chronologically. All redistricting events that took place in Nebraska between 1973 and 2013 are shown. District numbers are represented by the map fill colors.

Year	Statewide map
1973–1982	
1983–1992	
1993–2002	
2003–2013	
2013-2023	
Since 2023	

== Obsolete districts ==
=== Fourth district ===
The fourth district seat was eliminated after the 1960 census.

=== Fifth district ===
The fifth district seat was eliminated after the 1940 census.

=== Sixth district ===
The sixth district seat was eliminated after the 1930 census.

=== At-large district ===
The at-large district seat was eliminated in 1883.

== See also ==
- List of United States congressional districts
