= Nebraska Legislature 14th district =

American legislative district

Nebraska's 14th legislative district
- Map of Nebraska Legislature districts with the 14th district shaded in red
Senator
| John Arch; R–La Vista |
since 2019
- Demographics: 81.2% White; 4% Black; 9.2% Hispanic; 2.9% Asian; 0.4% Native American
- Population (2020): 40,857

The Nebraska Legislature's 14th district is one of the 49 legislative districts in the Nebraska Legislature. The district is located in eastern Nebraska and covers part of north-central Sarpy County. The area of Sarpy County it covers includes sections of Papillion and La Vista. John Arch has represented the district since 2019.

== Demographics ==
The US Census Bureau recorded the population as of 2020 at 40,857.

- 81.2% of the district is White.
- 9.2% of the district is Hispanic.
- 4% of the district is Black.
- 2.9% of the district is Asian.
- 0.4% of the district is Native American.

== List of representatives ==
| Representative | Party | Years of service | Legislature | Residence |
|---|---|---|---|---|
| John Arch | Republican | 2019 - present | 106th-109th | La Vista |
| Jim Smith | Republican | 2011-2019 | 102nd-105th | Papillion |
| Tim Gay | Independent | 2007-2011 | 100th-101st | Papillion |
| Nancy Thompson | Democratic | 1997-2007 | 95th-99th | Papillion |
| Ron Withem | Democratic | 1983-1997* | 88th-95th | Papillion |
| Tom Doyle | Democratic | 1983* | 88th | Greeley |
| Walter Duda | Republican | 1981-1983 | 87th | Omaha |
| Thomas Fitzgerald | Democratic | 1975-1981* | 84th-87th | Omaha |
| Duke Snyder | Republican | 1971-1975 | 82nd-83rd | Omaha |
| Florence Reynolds | Republican | 1967-1971 | 77th-81st | Omaha |

- Ron Withem resigned before his term ended. Nancy Thomas was appointed to fill the vacancy.
- Tom Doyle resigned before his term ended. Ron Withem was appointed to fill the vacancy.
- Thomas Fitzgerald resigned before his term ended. Walter Duda was appointed to fill the vacancy.
