= Nebraska Legislature 16th district =

American legislative district

Nebraska's 16th legislative district
- Map of Nebraska Legislature districts with the 16th district shaded in red
Senator
Ben Hansen; R–Blair
since 2019
- Demographics: 91.9% White; 0.3% Black; 5.1% Hispanic; 0.4% Asian; 0.5% Native American
- Population (2020): 38,045

The Nebraska Legislature's 16th district is one of the 49 legislative districts in the Nebraska Legislature. The district is located in northeastern Nebraska and covers all of Burt, Washington, Cuming, and eastern Stanton counties. Notable settlements in the area include Blair, West Point, Tekamah, Oakland, and Wisner. Ben Hansen has represented the district since 2019.

== Demographics ==
The US Census Bureau recorded the population as of 2020 at 38,045.

- 91.9% of the district is White.
- 5.1% of the district is Hispanic.
- 0.5% of the district is Native American.
- 0.4% of the district is Asian.
- 0.3% of the district is Black.

== List of representatives ==
Representative	Party	Years of service	Legislature	Residence
Ben Hansen	Republican	2019–present	106th-109th	Blair
Lydia Brasch	Republican	2011–2019	102nd-105th	Bancroft
Kent Rogert	Democratic	2007–2010	100th-101st	Tekamah
Matt Connealy	Democratic	1999–2007	96th-99th	Decatur
Bud Robinson	Republican	1991–1999	92nd-95th	Blair
Frank Korshoj	Democratic	1987–1991	90th-91st	Herman
James Goll	Republican	1981–1986	87th-89th	Tekamah
Walter George	Republican	1975–1980*	84th-86th	Blair
Blair Richendifer	Democratic	1972–1975	82nd-83rd	Walthill
Claire Holmquist	Republican	1967–1972*	77th-82nd	Oakland

- Walter George resigned before his term ended. James Goll was appointed to fill the vacancy.
- Claire Holmquist died during his term. Blair Richendifer was appointed to fill the vacancy.
