= 2004 United States House of Representatives elections in Nebraska =

- November 2, 2004

All 3 Nebraska seats to the United States House of Representatives
	Majority party	Minority party
Party	Republican	Democratic
Last election	3	0
Seats won	3	0
Seat change	Steady	Steady
Popular vote	514,115	230,697
Percentage	67.22%	30.16%
Swing	▼14.43pp	▲20.27pp

Republican
40–50%
50–60%
60–70%
80–90%
90–100%
Democratic
50–60%
60–70%

The 2004 United States House of Representatives elections in Nebraska were held on November 2, 2004 to determine who will represent the state of Nebraska in the United States House of Representatives. Nebraska has three seats in the House, apportioned according to the 2000 United States census. Representatives are elected for two-year terms.

== Overview ==
United States House of Representatives elections in Nebraska, 2004
Party	Votes	Percentage	Seats	+/–
Republican	514,115	67.22%	3	—
Democratic	230,697	30.16%	0	—
Green Party	11,108	1.45%	0	—
Libertarian	4,656	0.61%	0	—
Nebraska Party	3,396	0.44%	0	—
Totals	764,972	100.00%	3	—

== District 1 ==
2004 Nebraska's 1st congressional district election
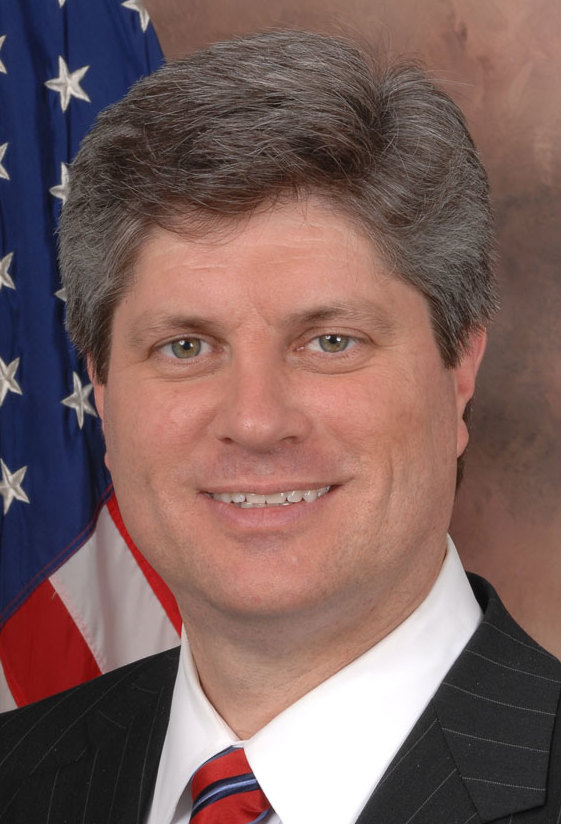

Nominee	Jeff Fortenberry	Matt Connealy
Party	Republican	Democratic
Popular vote	143,756	113,971
Percentage	53.9%	42.7%
U.S. Representative before election
Doug Bereuter
Republican
Elected U.S. Representative
Jeff Fortenberry
Republican

Incumbent Republican Congressman Doug Bereuter represented the 1st district, which included the city of Lincoln and most of eastern Nebraska, since he was first elected in 1978. He declined to seek re-election in 2004, and resigned from Congress on August 31, 2004, to become the president and CEO of The Asia Foundation. A crowded Republican primary emerged to succeed him, with Curt Bromm, the Speaker of the Nebraska Legislature, emerging as the favorite. Bromm was endorsed by Bereuter, but was attacked by television advertisements aired by the Club for Growth that attacked him for raising taxes to make up for a state budget shortfall. The advertisements sought to elevate Greg Ruehle, the Executive Director of the Nebraska Cattleman, which prompted the Republican Main Street Partnership to air advertisements criticizing Ruehle. Fortenberry, meanwhile, ran a grassroots campaign and ultimately managed to win a thin plurality of the vote.

In the general election, Fortenberry faced State Senator Matt Connealy, the Democratic nominee. Though Connealy was a high-profile candidate, he was unable to overcome Republican President George W. Bush's strong performance in Nebraska that year, and Fortenberry ultimately won his first term by a wide margin.

=== Republican primary ===
==== Candidates ====
- Jeff Fortenberry, former Lincoln City Councilman
- Curt Bromm, Speaker of the Nebraska Legislature
- Greg Ruehle, Executive Director of the Nebraska Cattlemen
- Daniel Manning, educator
- Bob Van Valkenburg, business consultant
- Andrew J. Ringsmuth, journalist and information technology manager
- Greg Walburn, currency analyst

==== Results ====
Republican primary results
Party	Candidate	Votes	%
Republican	Jeff Fortenberry	18,735	30.63%
Republican	Curt Bromm	15,708	25.67%
Republican	Greg Ruehle	10,077	16.49%
Republican	Daniel Manning	1,027	1.68%
Republican	Bob Van Valkenburg	1,044	1.71%
Republican	Andrew J. Ringsmuth	469	0.77%
Republican	Greg Walburn	696	1.14%
Total votes		61,756	100.00%

=== Democratic primary ===
==== Candidates ====
- Matt Connealy, State Senator
- Janet Stewart, Fremont attorney
- Charlie Matulka, 2002 Democratic nominee for the U.S. Senate
- Phil Chase, retired software executive

==== Results ====
Democratic primary results
Party	Candidate	Votes	%
Democratic	Matt Connealy	14,807	40.85%
Democratic	Janet Stewart	9,857	27.19%
Democratic	Charlie Matulka	2,750	7.59%
Democratic	Phil Chase	2,080	5.74%
Total votes		36,494	100.00%

=== Green Party primary ===
==== Candidates ====
- Steven R. Larrick, researcher for the Nebraska Appleseed Center for Law in the Public Interest

==== Results ====
Green Party primary results
Party	Candidate	Votes	%
Green	Steven R. Larrick	69	100.00%
Total votes		69	100.00%

=== General election ===
==== Predictions ====
Source	Ranking	As of
The Cook Political Report	Lean R	October 29, 2004
Sabato's Crystal Ball	Lean R	November 1, 2004

==== Results ====
2004 Nebraska's 1st congressional district election
Party	Candidate	Votes	%
Republican	Jeff Fortenberry	143,756	53.85%
Democratic	Matt Connealy	113,971	42.69%
Green	Steven R. Larrick	7,345	2.76%
Total votes		265,072	100.00%
Republican hold			

== District 2 ==
2004 Nebraska's 2nd congressional district election
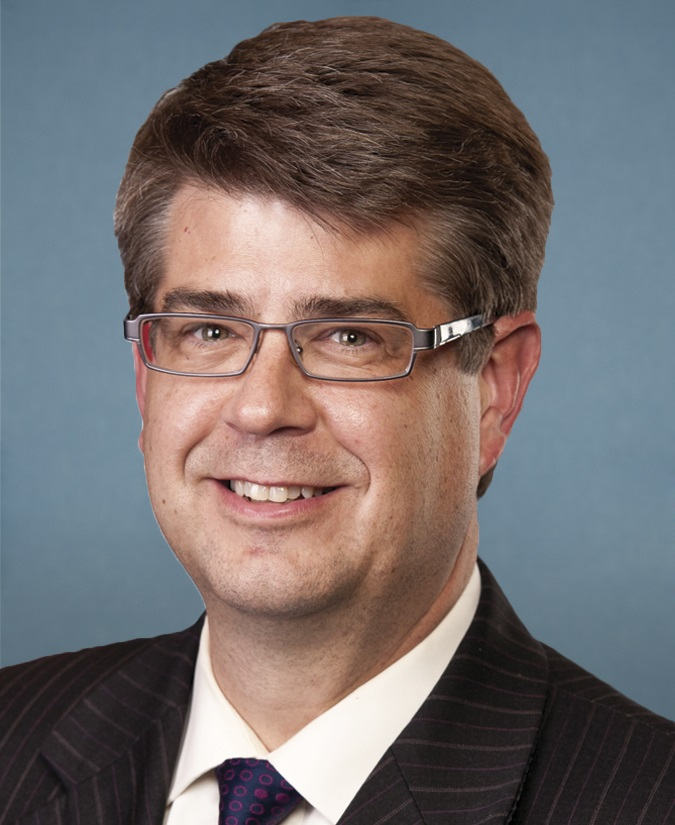

Nominee	Lee Terry	Nancy Thompson
Party	Republican	Democratic
Popular vote	152,608	90,292
Percentage	61.0%	36.1%
U.S. Representative before election
Lee Terry (inc.)
Republican
Elected U.S. Representative
Lee Terry
Republican

Incumbent Republican Congressman Lee Terry, who represented the Omaha-based 2nd district, ran for re-election to a fourth term. He was challenged by State Senator Nancy Thompson, the Democratic nominee, and defeated her with 61% of the vote to win another term.

=== Republican primary ===
==== Candidates ====
- Lee Terry, incumbent Congressman

==== Results ====
Republican primary results
Party	Candidate	Votes	%
Republican	Lee Terry (inc.)	23,463	100.00%
Total votes		23,463	100.00%

=== Democratic primary ===
==== Candidates ====
- Nancy Thompson, State Senator

==== Results ====
Democratic primary results
Party	Candidate	Votes	%
Democratic	Nancy Thompson	18,573	100.00%
Total votes		18,573	100.00%

=== Libertarian primary ===
==== Candidates ====
- Jack Graziano

==== Results ====
Libertarian primary results
Party	Candidate	Votes	%
Libertarian	Jack Graziano	109	100.00%
Total votes		109	100.00%

=== General election ===
==== Predictions ====
Source	Ranking	As of
The Cook Political Report	Likely R	October 29, 2004
Sabato's Crystal Ball	Safe R	November 1, 2004

==== Results ====
2004 Nebraska's 2nd congressional district election
Party	Candidate	Votes	%
Republican	Lee Terry (inc.)	152,608	61.05%
Democratic	Nancy Thompson	90,292	36.12%
Libertarian	Jack Graziano	4,656	1.86%
Green	Dante Salvatierra	2,208	0.88%
Total votes		249,764	100.00%
Republican hold			

== District 3 ==
2004 Nebraska's 3rd congressional district election
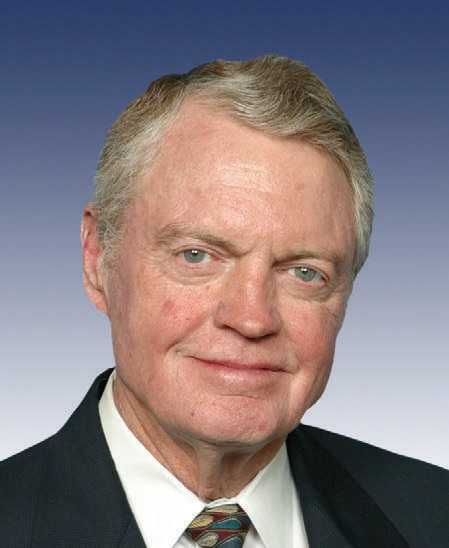

Nominee	Tom Osborne	Donna J. Anderson
Party	Republican	Democratic
Popular vote	218,751	26,434
Percentage	87.1%	10.5%
U.S. Representative before election
Tom Osborne
Republican
Elected U.S. Representative
Tom Osborne
Republican

Incumbent Republican Congressman Tom Osborne ran for re-election to his third term in Congress in the 3rd district, which included most of the state's conservative, rural territory. He was challenged by Columbus cosmetologist Donna J. Anderson, the Democratic nominee, in the general election. Owing to the conservative nature of the district, Osborne overwhelmingly won re-election.

=== Republican primary ===
==== Candidates ====
- Tom Osborne, incumbent Congressman

==== Results ====
Republican primary results
Party	Candidate	Votes	%
Republican	Tom Osborne	58,558	100.00%
Total votes		58,558	100.00%

=== Democratic primary ===
==== Candidates ====
- Donna J. Anderson, Columbus cosmetologist

==== Results ====
Democratic primary results
Party	Candidate	Votes	%
Democratic	Donna J. Anderson	19,747	100.00%
Total votes		19,747	100.00%

=== Nebraska Party primary ===
==== Candidates ====
- Joseph A. Rosberg
- Duane E. F. Dufek

==== Results ====
Nebraska Party primary results
Party	Candidate	Votes	%
Nebraska	Joseph A. Rosberg	63	70.00%
Nebraska	Duane E. F. Dufek	27	30.00%
Total votes		90	100.00%

=== General election ===
==== Predictions ====
Source	Ranking	As of
The Cook Political Report	Safe R	October 29, 2004
Sabato's Crystal Ball	Safe R	November 1, 2004

==== Results ====
2004 Nebraska's 3rd congressional district election
Party	Candidate	Votes	%
Republican	Tom Osborne	218,751	87.06%
Democratic	Donna J. Anderson	26,434	10.52%
Nebraska	Joseph A. Rosberg	3,396	1.35%
Green	Roy Guisinger	1,555	0.62%
Total votes		250,136	100.00%
Republican hold			

Preceded by 2002 elections	United States House elections in Nebraska; 2004	Succeeded by 2006 elections
