= Los Robles Hospital & Medical Center =

- Hospital Corporation of America

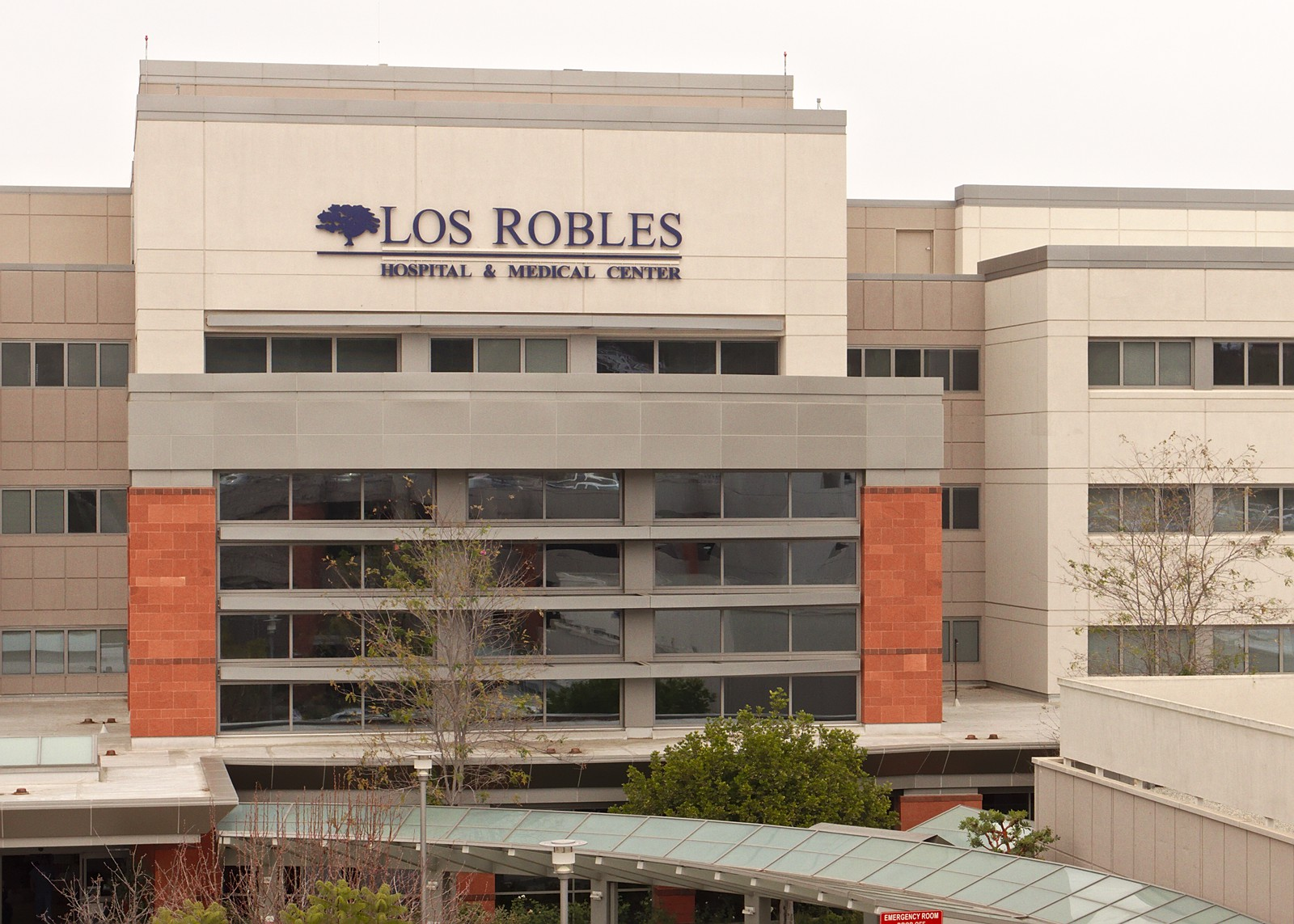

Geography
- Location: 215 W Janss Rd, Thousand Oaks, California, United States
- Coordinates: 34.2073°N 118.8825°W

Organization
- Care system: Private
- Type: Community

Services
- Emergency department: Level II trauma center
- Beds: 382

History
- Founded: 1968

Links
- Website: http://www.losrobleshospital.com/
- Lists: Hospitals in California

Los Robles Hospital & Medical Center is the largest hospital in eastern Ventura County. It is a hospital and medical center complex in the city of Thousand Oaks, California. It is a 382-bed acute care hospital with a level II trauma center. The facility is owned by HCA−Hospital Corporation of America, and operated by their HCA Far West Division. Los Robles means "The Oaks" in Spanish, and the name refers to the thousands of oak trees in surrounding Thousand Oaks. It had 1,720 employees in 2016.

The hospital and medical center complex was built by the Linde family, and opened on November 12, 1968, as a 220-bed general acute-care facility. The first open-heart surgery in Ventura County was performed here on June 24, 1970. The hospital is known statewide for its Hyperbaric Medicine Unit, which was launched in June 1974. It was one of six such units in Southern California in the late 1980s. It is also known for being the most specialized heart center in Ventura County, and the first heart catheterization in the region was performed here in December 1969. Los Robles opened a Pacemaker Clinic in 1972, three years prior to the nation's first pacemakers being implanted.

Besides 24-hour emergency services, the hospital is also home of Los Robles SurgiCenter, Radiology and Breast Center, Conejo Medical Magnetic Resonance Systems, North Oaks Radiation, and the Conejo Renal Center. They had a total staff of over 400 physicians as of 2002. Among its medical services are critical- and intensive care units, a comprehensive cancer center, surgical- and medical care units, operating rooms, home services, a senior center, rehabilitation center, and a pain management facility.

As of 2021, the hospital now houses several residency programs sponsored by HCA. These include internal medicine, anesthesiology, general surgery, neurology, and transitional year.

== History ==
Los Robles Hospital, which was completed in November 1968, originally had a 223-bed facility which included modern maternity and pediatric sections, extensive specialized medical departments, and also a highly trained staff of over 400 employees. The four-story structure was the largest hospital in Southeast Ventura County as of 1973, and it overlooks the western reaches of Thousand Oaks.

Ventura County's first triplets were born at Los Robles in June 1976.

The site of the hospital was home to a Chumash summer camp in pre-colonial times.

== Awards and recognition ==
The hospital is accredited by the Joint Commission of Accreditation of Health Care Organizations, and is nationally renowned for its cardiac care. It has earned multiple top honors for its specialized care. It has been rated one of the best hospitals in America for cardiac care by Center for Medicare and Medicaid Services (CMS). It is rated in the top 5% of U.S. hospitals for clinical excellence by National Research Corporation. It is the only California hospital to be certified by both Ventura- and Los Angeles County as a STEMI-designated site for rapid heart attack response. It has been a #1 Consumer Choice Award Winner by the National Research Corporation. Furthermore, Los Robles was the first Ventura County hospital to receive a full accreditation designation by National Accreditation Program for Breast Centers.

It was the first hospital in Ventura County to be awarded the comprehensive stroke certification from DNV GL in 2016. The accreditation is one of 14 in California, and reflects the highest level of competence for treating acute stroke.

== Deaths ==
- Tom Laughlin (1931-2013), actor
- Joseph Stefano (1922-2006), screenwriter for the film Psycho
- Sandra Dee (1942-2005), actress
- Eric Turner (1968-2000), NFL-player
- Jerry Heller (1940-2016), music manager
- Robert Urich (1946-2002), actor
- Robert E. Conot (1929-2011), journalist and author
- Ed Savko (1926-2012), owner of The Rock Store
- Stanley Holden (1928-2007), ballet dancer
- Jim South (1939-2020), talent agent
- Strother Martin (1919-1980), actor
- Jacklyn Zeman (1953-2023), Actress

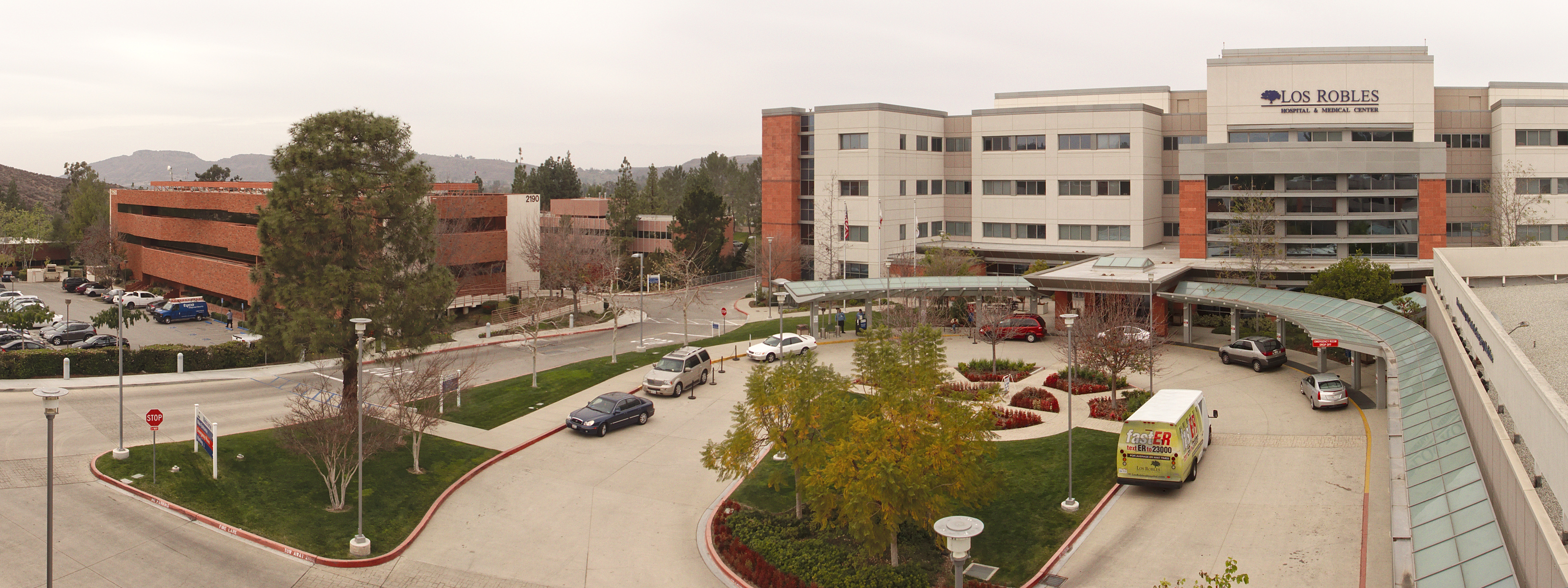
The Los Robles Hospital & Medical Center complex.
