= Brad Ashford =

American politician (1949–2022)

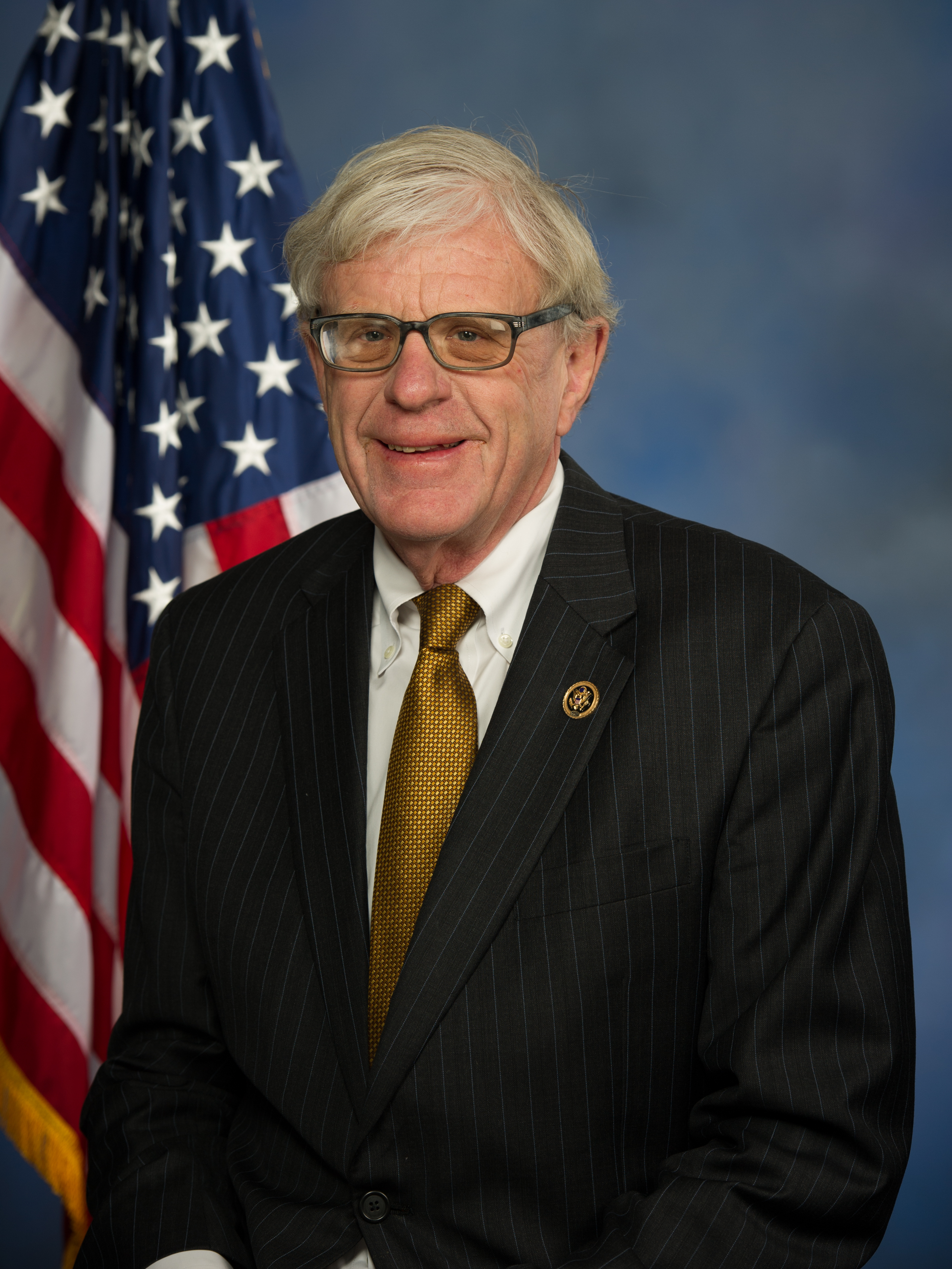
- Official portrait, 2015

Member of the U.S. House of Representatives from Nebraska's 2nd district
- In office January 3, 2015 – January 3, 2017
- Preceded by: Lee Terry
- Succeeded by: Don Bacon

Member of the Nebraska Legislature
- In office January 3, 2007 – January 3, 2015
- Preceded by: Jim Jensen
- Succeeded by: John McCollister
- Constituency: 20th district
- In office January 7, 1987 – January 7, 1995
- Preceded by: Peter Hoagland
- Succeeded by: Pam Brown
- Constituency: 6th district

Personal details
- Born: John Bradley Ashford; November 10, 1949 Omaha, Nebraska, U.S.
- Died: April 19, 2022 (aged 72)
- Resting place: Forest Lawn Memorial Park
- Party: Republican (before 1982, 1988–2011); Democratic (1982–1988, 2013–2022); Independent (2011–2013)
- Spouse: Ann Ferlic
- Children: 3
- Education: Colgate University (BA); Creighton University (JD)
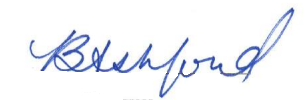
- Signature

John Bradley Ashford (November 10, 1949 – April 19, 2022) was an American politician who served in the Nebraska Legislature and the United States House of Representatives from Nebraska's 2nd congressional district from 2015 to 2017. He is the most recent Democrat to represent Nebraska in Congress.

After serving in the state legislature from 1987 to 1995, Ashford ran for the Republican nomination in Nebraska's 2nd congressional district, but was defeated. He returned to the state legislature in 2007 and served until 2015 when he successfully ran for the House of Representatives against incumbent representative Lee Terry. After serving in the House of Representatives for two years he was defeated by Don Bacon and was later defeated in the Democratic primary in 2018 when he ran to reclaim his House seat.

== Early life ==
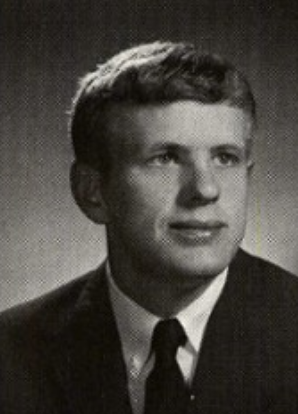
Brad Ashford in 1967

John Bradley Ashford was born in Omaha, Nebraska, on November 10, 1949, to Don Ashford and Ellen Swanson. Don Ashford had served as a bomber during World War II and received a Distinguished Flying Cross. Ellen Swanson and her family had immigrated from Sweden and her father Otto Swanson had been a businessman in Omaha, Nebraska, who had helped with the formation of the National Conference of Christians and Jews due to local boycotts of Jewish businesses.

Ashford attended Westside High School in Omaha and graduated in 1967. From 1968 to 1971, he attended and graduated from Colgate University with a bachelor of Arts. During his attendance at Colgate University he served as an intern for Senator Roman Hruska and attended an anti-Vietnam War rally. He later criticized Forrest Gump for its depiction of Abbie Hoffman, but stated that he still enjoyed the movie as "it was a travelogue of my early life".

From 1971 to 1974, he attended and graduated from Creighton University with a Juris Doctor. From 1974 to 1975, he served as a staff attorney for the Federal Highway Administration.

Brad married Ann Ferlic, with whom he had three children.

== Career ==
=== Nebraska Legislature ===
==== 1987–1995 ====
In 1986, Ashford considered running for the Democratic nomination in Nebraska's 2nd congressional district against incumbent Republican Hal Daub. However, on January 15, he announced that he would run in the 6th district in the state legislature as more important decisions occurred at the state level and it would cost less than a congressional campaign. On February 3, he formally announced his campaign. In the general election he received the support of the Democratic Party and defeated Republican-backed nominee Robert G. Cunningham.

On January 7, 1987, Ashford was sworn into the state legislature and was appointed to serve on the Judiciary and Transportation committees for the 1987–1989 session. He was appointed to serve on the Appropriations and executive board committees during the 1989–1991 session. He was appointed to serve on the Appropriations committee and serve as the chairman of the Intergovernmental Cooperation committee during the 1993–1995 session.

On July 31, 1987, Douglas County Commissioner Steve McCollister said that he and Ashford discussed Ashford switching to the Republican Party and running to succeed Hal Daub as the representative from Nebraska's 2nd congressional district. On August 3, Ashford admitted that he had discussed switching parties, but said that the discussion was theoretical and that he wouldn't run to succeed Daub if Cece Zorinsky ran for the Democratic nomination as polling showed her with 43% against Ashford's 2%.

On January 28, 1988, Ashford announced that he had changed his party affiliation to Republican with Governor Kay A. Orr at his side. He stated that he would support the Republican nominee in the Senate election, but the next day he was appointed onto the finance committee of Bob Kerrey's Democratic senatorial campaign. During the 1988 Republican presidential primaries Ashford, eighteen other Republican state legislators, and Lieutenant Governor William E. Nichol endorsed Senator Bob Dole.

On February 22, 1990, he announced that he would seek reelection and no other candidates filed to run against him.

==== Interlude ====
In 1995, Ashford and his wife supported Chuck Hagel in the Senate election and sponsored his fundraisers as he supported a ban on the sale of assault weapons and opposed abortion except in the cases of rape, incest, or threat to the mother's life. However, they withdrew their support after Hagel changed his positions to repealing assault weapon bans and being against abortion in all cases except for a threat to the mother's life. During the 1996 Republican presidential primaries he supported Steve Forbes and ran as one of his delegates from the 2nd Congressional district. In 1997, he became a lobbyist to the Nebraska Unicameral and earned $500.

==== 2007–2015 ====
In 2005, he stated that he was considering to run for another term in the state legislature. He later announced that he would run in the 20th state district. In the general election he defeated Carol Casey.

He was appointed to serve on the Education committee and as chairman of the Judicial committee during the 100th legislative session from 2007 to 2009. He was reappointed to serve on the Education committee and as chairman of the Judiciary committee during the 101st legislative session from 2009 to 2011.

In 2014, it was speculated that he would either run for the Democratic nomination in the Senate election or for attorney general, but he did not run. During the 2014 Nebraska gubernatorial election he endorsed Democratic nominee Chuck Hassebrook.

=== U.S. House of Representatives ===
==== 1994 ====
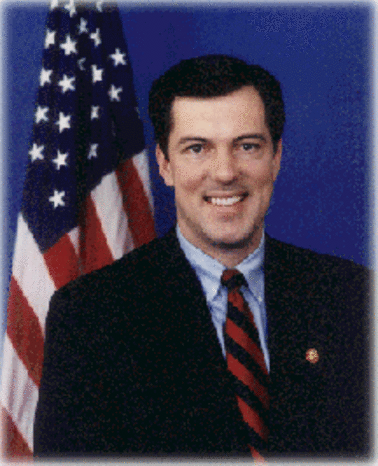
Jon Lynn Christensen defeated Ashford in Nebraska's 2nd Congressional district Republican primary in 1994

On August 14, 1993, Ashford announced that he would not seek reelection to the state legislature and that he was interested in running for the Republican nomination in Nebraska's 2nd congressional district. On October 2, he formally announced his intention to seek the Republican nomination in the district and stated that his priorities would be to ban military-style assault weapons and focus on jobs and welfare reform. In the Republican primary he lost to Jon Lynn Christensen, who received over fifty percent of the popular vote, and narrowly came ahead of Ronald L. Staskiewicz. During the primary campaign he raised $145,715.00 and spent $146,002.00.

After losing the congressional primary Ashford stated on May 11, 1994, that he was interested in running in the Omaha special mayoral election. On June 1, he announced that he would not run in the election. He later joined Brenda Council's mayoral campaign.

==== 2014 ====
On February 12, 2014, Ashford announced that he would run for the Democratic nomination in Nebraska's 2nd congressional district. He selected Kieran McCarney, the former communications director and AFL–CIO Nebraska affiliate, to serve as his campaign manager. He won the Democratic primary against Mark Aupperle.

On October 17, 2014, the National Republican Congressional Committee released an advertisement tying Ashford to Nikko Jenkins as Ashford had supported legislation in the state legislature giving early prison release for good conduct. Ashley Lewis, a Democratic Congressional Campaign Committee spokeswoman, stated that the ad had "no place in America", Ashford stated that it was a desperate attack from Lee Terry's failing campaign, and former Republican National Committee Chairman Michael Steele called the ad racist. After the release of the NRCC ad he raised over $20,500.

In the general election Ashford narrowly defeated Terry, who with Steve Southerland was one of only two incumbent Republicans to lose reelection to a Democratic opponent during the 2014 House of Representatives elections. During the campaign he raised $1,246,958.11 and spent $1,231,468.32 while Terry's better funded campaign raised $3,106,288.30 and spent $3,084,768.22.

==== 2016 ====
Brad Ashford's congressional campaign logo

On December 16, 2015, Ashford endorsed former secretary of state Hillary Clinton for the Democratic presidential nomination. He faced no opposition in the Democratic primary. Although The Cook Political Report had predicted that Nebraska's 2nd congressional district would lean Democratic and Ashford had received more funding than his opponent. Ashford narrowly lost to Republican nominee Don Bacon. Ashford was the first incumbent representative in the 2nd congressional district to lose reelection after one term in office since Eugene D. O'Sullivan in the 1950 election. During his victory speech Bacon praised Ashford as "an honorable man" and stated that he cried during Ashford's concession speech.

In 2018, Ashford accused Russian agents of hacking his emails during the 2016 election, after twelve indictments were announced by Robert Mueller. He stated that all of his email correspondence with the Democratic Congressional Campaign Committee was obtained by Russian hackers, but he did not believe that any information was given to Bacon or his campaign.

==== 2018 ====
Ashford considered running against Bacon again after he voted for the American Health Care Act of 2017 which would have partially repealed the Patient Protection and Affordable Care Act. In June 2017, Ashford announced that he would seek the Democratic nomination to run against Bacon for another term. On September 20, Ashford formally announced his campaign at the Old Mattress Factory in Omaha, Nebraska, and filed to run in the election on January 30, 2018. During the campaign he received organizational and fundraising support from the Democratic Congressional Campaign Committee as a member of the Red to Blue program. Ashford was also endorsed by Giffords, a gun control advocacy organization that was founded by former representative Gabby Giffords and her husband Mark Kelly.

However, in the Democratic primary he was narrowly defeated by Kara Eastman, who criticized him for having been a member of the Republican Party in the past, despite having outraised her with $571,000 to her $356,000. In the general election Eastman was narrowly defeated by Bacon.

=== Committee assignments ===
- Committee on Agriculture
  - Subcommittee on Nutrition
  - Subcommittee on General Farm Commodities and Risk Management
- Committee on Armed Services
  - Subcommittee on Strategic Forces
  - Subcommittee on Intelligence, Emerging Threats and Capabilities

== Later life and death ==
In February 2017, Ashford was selected to serve as the head of Midtown 2050, an Omaha development group, but resigned in April as he felt that he wasn't fit for the position.

On February 1, 2019, Ashford's wife Ann Ferlic announced that she would run for the Democratic nomination in Nebraska's 2nd congressional district. During the primary campaign Ferlic was endorsed by former senators Ben Nelson and Bob Kerrey and former lieutenant governor Kim Robak. Ferlic also claimed that she was the only electable candidate citing Kara Eastman's loss to Don Bacon in 2018. In the Democratic primary, Eastman easily defeated Ferlic with over sixty percent of the popular vote. After Ferlic's defeat in the Democratic primary the Ashfords declined to endorse Eastman. In October, Ashford endorsed his former rival Bacon over Eastman.

On August 1, 2018, Douglas County District Judge Mark Ashford, his brother, died from a stroke. In May 2019, Ashford was hospitalized after a fluid backup happened in his lungs due to blood clots. In February 2022, Ashford announced he had been diagnosed with brain cancer. He died on April 19, 2022, aged 72. He was buried at Forest Lawn Memorial Park in Omaha.

== Political positions ==
In 1988, Ashford, Jerry Chizek, and Bernice Labedz sponsored legislation that would require all video-cassettes marketed to minors to be given a rating label. The bill was created in response to complaints that Faces of Death and other graphic movies lacked warning labels.

In 1990, Ashford introduced an amendment that would allow the state legislature to confirm members of the appellate court, but it failed with twenty-one to eight voting against it.

On April 3, 1991, he voted in favor of legislation altering Nebraska's method of electoral college allotment from winner-take-all to being distributed to the statewide winner and the winner of each congressional district. The legislation was later signed into law by Governor Ben Nelson.

=== Abortion ===
In 1992, a legal challenge was brought against Pennsylvania's abortion laws. Thirteen governors, twelve lieutenant governors, seventeen attorneys general, nine hundred ninety-five state legislators signed a friend of the court brief to support a woman's right to get an abortion. Ashford and seven other Nebraskan senators signed the brief.

In 2010, he proposed an amendment to an abortion bill to allow illegal immigrants to receive state-funded prenatal care. He cited reports showing the illegal immigrants were getting abortions as they lacked Medicaid coverage.

=== Affordable Care Act ===
On September 18, 2014, Ashford debated incumbent representative Lee Terry and during the debate he stated that he would have voted against the Affordable Care Act as it lacked bipartisan support. Ashford later criticized Don Bacon after he voted for a partial repeal of the Affordable Care Act.

=== Capital punishment ===
In 1987, the Judiciary committee voted five to two, with one member absent, in favor of advancing legislation introduced by Ernie Chambers that would abolish the death penalty. Ashford voted in favor of advancing the legislation, but stated that he would not support it when it went to the floor vote. However, on April 27, the state legislature voted twenty-three to nineteen, with seven not voting, against the legislation with Ashford voting in favor.

In 1992, he sponsored legislation created by Ernie Chambers to repeal the death penalty in Nebraska, but later withdrew his sponsorship.

=== Same-sex marriage ===
Ashford supported same-sex marriage. Before Obergefell v. Hodges he attempted to reach a middle ground on Nebraska's same-sex marriage ban by allowing civil unions. He praised the Supreme Court of the United States for its ruling in Obergefell v. Hodges that same-sex couples had the right to marry.

=== Congressional salaries ===
In 2014, Ashford and Dave Loebsack introduced the Congressional Halt in Pay Increases and Cut Congressional Pay Act would decrease congressional salaries by ten percent and prohibit automatic salary increases. He, Gwen Graham, Scott Peters, and Ami Bera sponsored legislation that would withhold congressional salaries if the Department of Homeland Security shut down due to a lack of funding.

=== Crime ===
In 1987, Ashford and Carol McBride Pirsch co-sponsored legislation that would force shoplifters to pay up to $150 to their victims. On April 15, Ernie Chambers attempted to kill the bill, but the legislature voted twenty-two to twelve against killing the bill. On April 29, the legislature voted unanimously with twenty-six in favor of the bill as Chambers was absent. On May 20, the legislature voted thirty-one to thirteen in favor of the legislation during the second round vote. Chambers made another motion to kill the bill, but the legislature voted twenty-eight to sixteen against his motion.

=== Development ===
Ashford introduced legislation, with Senator Deb Fischer's sponsorship, to allow a public-private partnership to build a veterans medical facility in Omaha, Nebraska, with $56 million provided by the Department of Veterans Affairs and $80 million provided by private donors. The legislation was signed into law by President Barack Obama on December 17, 2016.

In 1989, he sponsored legislation to transition ownership of Joslyn Castle from the Omaha Public School District to the Nebraska State Historical Society. On February 5, 1990, the state legislature unanimously approved the legislation during the first round vote with twenty-six in favor.

In 2015, he voted to approve the Keystone Pipeline.

=== Gun control ===
On March 20, 1989, Ashford proposed an amendment to a drug penalty bill that would ban semi-automatic weapons, but Speaker Bill Barrett ruled that his proposed amendment was not germane. Ashford proposed another amendment that would ban the sale and manufacture of semi-automatic weapons a Class II felony with a punishment of one to fifty years in prison. However, Barrett ruled that the amendment was not germane and an attempt by Ashford to overrule his decision was defeated by a vote of twenty-six to fourteen.

In 1992, he introduced legislation that would prohibit the possession of a gun at a school or youth center with a first offense being a Class IV felony with a fine up to $10,000 and up to five years in prison and more violations being a Class II felony with up to twenty years in prison.

He introduced legislation that would make it a misdemeanor offense to store a gun within the reach of a child under the age of sixteen. However, the Judiciary Committee voted seven to one against the bill and when the bill was brought to the assembly on February 19, 1993, to bypass the Judiciary Committee it failed to receive the thirty votes needed.

In 2007, Chambers proposed another bill repealing the death penalty and on March 20, the state legislature voted twenty-five to twenty-four against, with Ashford voting in favor. The execution process for Carey Dean Moore was restarted one week before the vote and his execution in 2018 was the first in the state since 1997.

On February 22, 2018, Ashford stated that he would vote in favor of a federal ban on assault weapons.

==== Nebraska Brady Bill ====
In 1989, Ashford introduced a bill that would require people attempting to purchase handguns to fill out forms asking for their criminal record and mental health problems and institute a seven-day waiting period. On February 9, he announced that he would ask the state legislature to place a constitutional amendment onto the 1990 general election ballot that would repeal the 1989 right to bear arms ballot initiative as the 1989 ballot initiative would render his gun control legislation unconstitutional. The Judiciary committee voted five to two in favor of advancing the bill and the constitutional amendment although Ernie Chambers filed a motion to kill the bill which failed with five to two against.

From January 15 to 17, 1990, National Research Corporation conducted a poll of 450 Nebraskans on their opinion of Ashford's handgun control legislation. On January 23, The Lincoln Star published the poll which showed with a 4.6% margin of error that 87% approved, 11% disapproved, and 2% had no opinion. On party lines 88% of Republicans, 87% of Democrats, and 73% of independents approved and the congressional districts ranged from 78% approval in the 3rd congressional district, 90% in the 1st congressional district, and 91% in the 2nd congressional district.

In January 1990, Ashford campaigned in Wisconsin against a right to bear arms amendment and criticized Nebraska's 1989 ballot initiative at a Madison, Wisconsin news conference. Attorney General Robert M. Spire, Representative Peter Hoagland, and Handgun Control, Inc. vice-chair Sarah Brady, who referred to the legislation as the "Nebraska Brady Bill", supported the legislation. On March 8, a compromise amendment reducing the waiting period to two days, was approved with twenty-five to ten in favor. However, during first round voting later that day the state legislature voted twenty-one to twenty-one, with seven members not voting, failing to reach the twenty-five votes needed.

In 1991, Ashford reintroduced legislation that would impose a two-day waiting period for handgun purchases. On February 5, the Judiciary committee voted five to one in favor of advancing the bill. He considered proposing an amendment to his bill to limit its effects to only Douglas, Lancaster, and Sarpy counties. On March 28, Jerry Chizek proposed an amendment, that was approved with twenty-six to sixteen in favor, which would require an annual permit from local law enforcement.

On April 8, Ashford asked the state legislature to defer debate on his bill until May 8 and his request was accepted with thirty voting unanimously in favor. On May 16, the state legislature voted thirty-one to five in favor of a compromised bill during first round voting. The new bill had a two-day waiting period, the certificates to purchase handguns would be valid for three years rather than one, and the certificates could only be denied based on a person's criminal and mental history and their immigration status. On June 5, the state legislature voted thirty-four to eleven in favor of the bill during the second round vote.

=== Immigration ===
In 2008, legislation was proposed on the behalf of Governor Dave Heineman and Attorney General Jon Bruning that would have required local and state agencies to verify the immigration status of people seeking benefits. The Judiciary committee voted five to one in favor of killing the bill and Ashford later referred to the legislation as "partisan communications". Ashford later criticized Republicans for spreading pamphlets and robocalls that attacked Steve Lathrop for abstaining from the Judiciary committee vote.

In 2009, he introduced legislation to prohibit businesses from knowingly hiring illegal immigrants and would require employers to confirm employees using E-Verify after December 31, 2010.

== Electoral history ==
1986 Nebraska 6th state legislative district election
Party	Candidate	Votes	%
Nonpartisan	Brad Ashford	7,167	53.09%
Nonpartisan	Robert G. Cunningham	6,332	46.91%
Total votes		13,499	100.00%

1990 Nebraska 6th state legislative district election
Party	Candidate	Votes	%	±%
Nonpartisan	Brad Ashford (incumbent)	11,564	100.00%	+46.89%
Total votes		11,564	100.00%	

1994 Nebraska 2nd congressional district Republican primary
Party	Candidate	Votes	%
Republican	Jon Lynn Christensen	26,494	52.70%
Republican	Brad Ashford	12,340	24.55%
Republican	Ronald L. Staskiewicz	11,436	22.75%
Total votes		50,270	100.00%

2006 Nebraska 20th state legislative district election
Party	Candidate	Votes	%
Nonpartisan	Brad Ashford	6,913	58.42%
Nonpartisan	Carol Casey	4,920	41.58%
Total votes		11,833	100.00%

2010 Nebraska 20th state legislative district election
Party	Candidate	Votes	%	±%
Nonpartisan	Brad Ashford (incumbent)	7,690	100.00%	+41.58%
Total votes		7,690	100.00%	

2013 Omaha, Nebraska mayoral primary
Party	Candidate	Votes	%
Nonpartisan	Jean Stothert	18,870	32.21%
Nonpartisan	Jim Suttle (incumbent)	14,309	24.43%
Nonpartisan	Dave Nabity	10,204	17.42%
Nonpartisan	Brad Ashford	7,745	13.22%
Nonpartisan	Dan Welch	7,083	12.09%
Nonpartisan	Maura DeLuca	195	0.33%
Nonpartisan	Mort Sullivan	153	0.26%
Write-in		25	0.04%
Total votes		7,690	100.00%

2014 Nebraska 2nd congressional district Democratic primary
Party	Candidate	Votes	%
Democratic	Brad Ashford	16,989	81.44%
Democratic	Mark Aupperle	3,872	18.56%
Total votes		20,861	100.00%

2014 Nebraska 2nd congressional district election
Party	Candidate	Votes	%	±%
Democratic	Brad Ashford	83,872	49.03%	−0.17%
Republican	Lee Terry (incumbent)	78,157	45.69%	−5.11%
Libertarian	Steven Laird	9,021	5.27%	+5.27%
Total votes		171,050	100.00%	

2016 Nebraska 2nd congressional district Democratic primary
Party	Candidate	Votes	%	±%
Democratic	Brad Ashford (incumbent)	23,470	100.00%	+18.56%
Total votes		23,470	100.00%	

2016 Nebraska 2nd congressional district election
Party	Candidate	Votes	%	±%
Republican	Don Bacon	141,066	48.93%	+3.24%
Democratic	Brad Ashford (incumbent)	137,602	47.73%	−1.30%
Libertarian	Steven Laird	9,640	3.34%	−1.93%
Total votes		288,308	100.00%	

2018 Nebraska 2nd congressional district Democratic primary
Party	Candidate	Votes	%	±%
Democratic	Kara Eastman	21,357	51.64%	+51.64%
Democratic	Brad Ashford	19,998	48.36%	−51.64%
Total votes		41,355	100.00%	

U.S. House of Representatives
Preceded by Lee Terry	Member of the U.S. House of Representatives from Nebraska's 2nd congressional district 2015–2017	Succeeded by Don Bacon
