= Senator Newell =

Senator Newell may refer to:

- Dave Newell (1946–2016), Nebraska State Senate
- Edward D. Newell (1810–1888), Louisiana State Senate
- Graham S. Newell (1915–2008), Vermont State Senate
- Linda Newell (born 1957), Colorado State Senate

== See also ==
- Asa T. Newhall (1846–1937), Massachusetts State Senate
