= Florence Reynolds =

American politician (1898–1985)

Member of the Nebraska Legislature from the 14th district
- In office January 3, 1967 – January 5, 1971
- Preceded by: Claire Holmquist
- Succeeded by: Duke Snyder

Personal details
- Born: January 7, 1898 Atlantic, Iowa
- Died: November 27, 1985 (aged 87) Omaha, Nebraska
- Party: Republican
- Education: University of Iowa
- Occupation: Teacher, principal

Florence B. Reynolds (January 7, 1898 – November 27, 1985) was a Republican politician and teacher from Nebraska who served as a member of the Nebraska Legislature from the 14th district from 1967 to 1971.

== Early life ==
Reynolds was born in Atlantic, Iowa, in 1898. She was orphaned as a child and was raised by her sisters. After graduating high school, she attended the University of Iowa, and later moved to Omaha, Nebraska, where she taught music at Miller Park Elementary School. Reynolds was the principal at five grade schools in Omaha, and eventually retired as the principal at Miller Park. She was politically active, serving on the State Central Committee of the Nebraska Republican Party, and campaigned in support of creating an Omaha city manager.

== Nebraska Legislature ==
In 1966, following redistricting, Reynolds ran for the legislature from the newly created 14th district. Reynolds ran in a crowded primary, and faced former Omaha Police Chief Heine Boesen, farmer Larry Bowley, former Police Commissioner Richard Jensen, insurance agent Joseph O'Connor, plumber Theodore Strasser, merchant Robert Watson, and packing house worker Lucious Webb. Reynolds placed first in the primary, winning 23 percent of the vote. O'Connor placed second in the primary, winning 17 percent of the vote, Reynolds and O'Connor advanced to the general election, which Reynolds won, defeating O'Connor with 54 percent of the vote.

Reynolds ran for re-election in 1970, and was challenged by five opponents: barber Byril Brown, retired railroad worker Walter Hower, real estate broker Wayne Lowden, farmer Lee Sesemann, and news announcer Duke Snyder Reynolds narrowly placed second in the primary, winning 27 percent of the vote to Snyder's 28 percent. They proceeded to the general election, which Snyder won in a landslide, defeating Reynolds, 63–37 percent.

== Death ==
Reynolds died on November 27, 1985.
