= Walter Duda =

American politician (1921–2008)

Member of the Nebraska Legislature from the 14th district
- In office July 13, 1981 – January 5, 1983
- Preceded by: Thomas Fitzgerald
- Succeeded by: Tom Doyle

Personal details
- Born: January 9, 1921 Kansas City, Kansas
- Died: June 1, 2008 (aged 87) Omaha, Nebraska
- Party: Republican
- Spouse: Dorothy Duda (died 2008)
- Education: Iowa State University

Walter Duda (January 9, 1921 – June 1, 2008) was a Republican politician from Nebraska who served as a member of the Nebraska Legislature from 1981 to 1983.

== Early life ==
Duda was born in Kansas City, Kansas, in 1921, and grew up in Omaha, graduating from Omaha Central High School. He served in the Marines during World War II, and graduated from Iowa State University with his bachelor's degree in mechanical engineering. He operated a corn farm and worked in real estate.

In 1968, Duda ran for the Douglas County Board of Supervisors in the 3rd district, and won the Republican primary over Dexter Nygaard. He faced incumbent Democratic Supervisor Dan Lynch in the general election. Though Republicans won a majority on the board, Lynch narrowly defeated Duda.

Duda ran again for the Board of Supervisors in 1970 for one of three at-large seats, and won the Republican primary, along with insurance agent James Henderson and real estate salesman Harry Taylor, and they faced Democrats George Buglewicz, a sales manager; surveyor Bill Green; and incumbent Supervisor Jack Cavanahg. All three Democratic candidates won, marking the first time since 1936 that the county board was constituted by members of one political party.

== Nebraska Legislature ==
In 1978, Duda challenged incumbent State Senator Thomas Fitzgerald for re-election in the 14th district, along with U.S. Air Force veteran Jackson Graham, Ku Klux Klan recruiter Herschel Nelson, and businessman Theodore Strasser. Fitzgerald and Duda both received 35 percent of the vote in the primary, with Fitzgerald placing ahead of Duda by 2 votes, and they advanced to the general election. Fitzgerald narrowly defeated Duda in the general election, winning 52–48 percent.

Fitzgerald was appointed to the Liquor Control Commission by Governor Charles Thone in 1981, and Thone appointed Duda to serve out the remaining two years of Fitzgerald's term. He was sworn in on July 13, 1981. After the 14th district was relocated to Sarpy County following redistricting, Duda declined to run for a full term in 1982.

In 1984, Duda ran for the state legislature, seeking to succeed State Senator Dave Newell in the 13th district. In the nonpartisan primary, he faced former Douglas County Commissioner Dan Lynch, who defeated him in 1968; Northwestern Bell employee William Hoffman; insurance agent Bob Garrett; and pharmacy owner Luke Coniglio. Lynch placed first in the primary, winning 46 percent of the vote to Duda's 35 percent, and they both advanced to the general election. Lynch ultimately defeated Duda, winning 55 percent of the vote to Duda's 45 percent.
