= Lowen Kruse =

American politician from Nebraska (1929–2017)

Member of the Nebraska Legislature from the 13th district
- In office January 3, 2001 – January 7, 2009
- Preceded by: Dan Lynch
- Succeeded by: Tanya Cook

Personal details
- Born: February 25, 1929 Boelus, Nebraska
- Died: November 24, 2017 (aged 88) Omaha, Nebraska
- Party: Democratic
- Spouse: Ruth Wallis (m. 1956)
- Children: 2
- Education: Nebraska Wesleyan University (B.A.); Garrett Theological Seminary (M.A.)
- Occupation: Minister, author

Lowen V. Kruse (February 25, 1929 – November 24, 2017) was a Democratic politician from Nebraska who served as a member of the Nebraska Legislature from the 13th district from 2001 to 2009.

== Career ==
Kruse was born in Boelus, Nebraska, in 1929. He graduated from Boelus High School and from Nebraska Wesleyan University. Kruse later attended the Garrett Theological Seminary at Northwestern University, graduating with his master's degree in divinity, and served a United Methodist pastor. Kruse began his career in Muscatine, Iowa, in 1956, and became the executive pastor of the First United Methodist Church in Omaha. He retired in 1994.

== Nebraska Legislature ==
In 1996, Kruse ran for the Nebraska Legislature from the 13th district, challenging incumbent State Senator Dan Lynch for re-election. In the nonpartisan primary, Lynch placed first, receiving 55 percent of the vote, and he advanced to the general election with Kruse, who received 23 percent. Lynch won the general election, defeating Kruse with 56 percent of the vote.

Kruse challenged Lynch again in 2000. Kruse won 38 percent of the vote in the primary election, and proceeded to the general election with Lynch, who placed first with 49 percent. The race between the two was close, with Kruse appearing to narrowly defeat Lynch on election night. Kruse's victory over Lynch was confirmed when all of the votes were canvassed, and he received 53 percent of the vote to Lynch's 47 percent.

In 2004, Kruse ran for re-election, and was opposed by Anthony FastHorse, a Godfather's Pizza employee and student at the University of Nebraska Omaha. Kruse received 71 percent of the vote in the primary election, and defeated FastHorse with 69 percent of the vote in the general election.

Kruse was term-limited in 2008, and was succeeded by fellow Democrat Tanya Cook.

== Death ==
Kruse died on November 24, 2017.
