= Lee Terry =

American politician (born 1962)

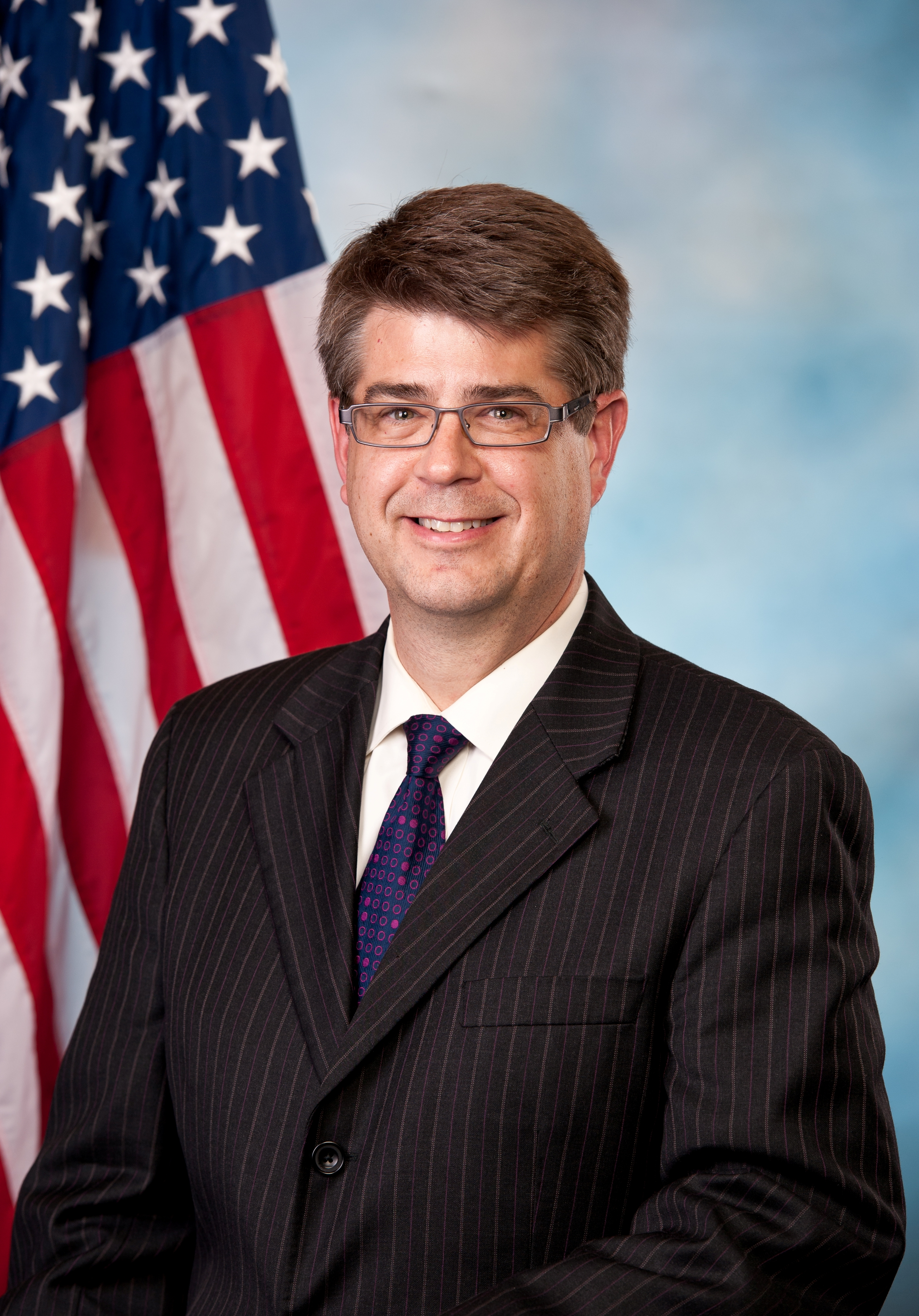

Member of the U.S. House of Representatives from Nebraska's 2nd district
- In office January 3, 1999 – January 3, 2015
- Preceded by: Jon Christensen
- Succeeded by: Brad Ashford

Personal details
- Born: Lee Raymond Terry; January 29, 1962 (age 64) Omaha, Nebraska, U.S.
- Party: Republican
- Spouse: Robyn Terry
- Education: University of Nebraska–Lincoln (BA); Creighton University (JD)

Lee Raymond Terry (born January 29, 1962) is an American former politician and senior law firm adviser. From 1999 to 2015, he served eight terms as a member of the U.S. House of Representatives for Nebraska's 2nd congressional district as a member of the Republican Party. Since 2015, Terry reactivated his law license and is a senior adviser to the government relations and public group for the international law firm Kelley Drye & Warren.

== Early life ==
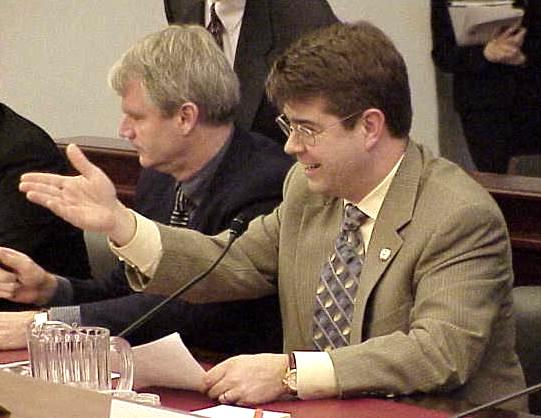
At House Committee on the Budget in 2003

Terry was born in Omaha, Nebraska, the son of Mary Chalone (née Courtney) and Leland Roy Terry, however Lee was raised by Janet Terry (née Ickes) and his father Leland Terry. He graduated from Omaha Northwest High School. He then attended the University of Nebraska–Lincoln. He received his J.D. from Creighton University School of Law in 1987. He worked as a private practice attorney specializing in civil matters before entering politics.

=== Omaha city council ===
He was a member of the Omaha City Council from the 6th district from 1991 to 1999, and served for two years as president and another two years as vice president of the body. While on the city council, Terry advocated using private-public partnerships as a way to lower taxation within Omaha. He was succeeded by Franklin Thompson.

== Elections ==
1998

In 1998, incumbent Republican Representative Jon Lynn Christensen retired to run for governor of Nebraska. Terry ran to succeed him, winning the Republican primary with a plurality, 40%, in a three-way race. Attorney Steve Kupka came second with 30%, businessman Brad Kuiper came third with 27% and three other candidates took the remaining 4%. In the general election, Terry defeated Democratic nominee Michael Scott, a television anchor, 66% to 34%.

2000–2004

In 2000, Terry defeated Democratic State Senator Shelley Kiel, 66% to 31%. In 2002, he defeated Democratic businessman Jim Simon, 63% to 33%. In 2004, he defeated Democratic State Senator Nancy Thompson, 61% to 36%.

2006

In 2006, he faced his first primary contest since 1998, defeating Steven Laird, who had run against Terry in 1998 and taken 1% in the primary. Terry defeated him again, 84% to 16%. In the general election, Lee faced Democratic businessman Jim Esch. In an election that saw Democrats make sweeping gains and retake control of the House after 12 years of a Republican majority, Terry defeated Esch by just 55% to 45%.

2008

In 2008, Terry faced another primary challenge from Steven Laird, defeating him by 84% to 16%. He also faced a rematch in the general election against Jim Esch. The election was concurrent with the 2008 presidential election. Nebraska is one of two states that uses the Congressional District Method in presidential elections: the winner of the statewide popular vote receives two electoral votes and the winner in each congressional district receives one vote. The Democratic nominee, Barack Obama, therefore targeted the district in case the Electoral College was otherwise tied. That effort made Terry even more vulnerable. CQ Politics forecast the race as 'Leans Republican', The Cook Political Report ranked it 'Republican Toss-Up' and The Rothenberg Political Report rated it 'Toss-Up/Tilt Democratic'. In response, Terry appealed to Obama supporters, dubbing them "Obama-Terry voters", and emphasizing that he would work with Obama if he won the election. National Committees and outside groups spent millions of dollars on the race and Terry's supporters tried to paint Esch as a "liberal", a supporter of gay marriage and insufficiently opposed to abortion. Ultimately, Terry was reelected by just 52% to 48%.

2010

In 2010, Terry faced another primary challenge, this one from Matt Sakalosky, a Tea Party challenger who accused Terry of being "insufficiently conservative". Terry refused to debate him and Sakalosky struggled to raise money but ended up taking 37% of the vote to Terry's 63%. In the general election, Esch declined to seek another rematch with Terry and so he faced Democratic State Senator Tom White. In a year that saw the Republicans make widespread gains and retake the House, Terry defeated White 61% to 39%.

2012

Terry was considered a potential candidate for the United States Senate in 2012 but declined to run, instead seeking an eighth House term. In the primary, he emerged victorious with 59% of the vote. The anti-Terry vote was split between former University of Nebraska football player Brett Lindstrom, who took 23%, and University of Nebraska professor Jack Heidel, with 11%. Glenn Freeman and Paul Anderson took 4% and 2% respectively. After redistricting following the 2010 United States census, Nebraska Republicans redrew the state's congressional map and made the 2nd district more Republican, so Obama's reelection campaign did not target the district as heavily as in 2008. Polling showed that Obama was still competitive in the district; he ultimately lost it, 53% to 46%. In the congressional election, Terry faced Democrat John Ewing, the Douglas County Treasurer. Terry outspent Ewing four to one and Ewing, who received no help from national Democrats, outperformed Obama and lost by just 51% to 49%.

2014

Terry defeated businessman Dan Frei in the primary by just under 6% of the votes, after outspending Frei by around 20 to 1 in the primary campaign. State Senator Brad Ashford defeated Terry in the general election, 49% to 46%. Terry was one of only two incumbent House Republicans to lose their seat in the general election that year, the other being Steve Southerland of Florida.

== Congress ==
When Terry first ran for Congress in 1998, he signed a pledge sponsored by Americans for Limited Government to limit himself to three terms in office. After winning the primary and general elections, Terry reneged on his promise, saying that he had signed the pledge because "term limits is an important issue and that was the way I wanted to signify my dedication to the issue." He ended up serving eight terms in the House.

On May 10, 2006, Terry appeared on the Better Know a District segment of the satirical news program The Colbert Report. He expressed his longtime support for alternative energy, specifically advocating the development of a hydrogen economy. Terry later teamed up with Stephen Colbert to submit an op-ed to the Los Angeles Times.

Terry is a staunch advocate of federal prohibition of online poker. In 2006, he cosponsored H.R. 4777, the Internet Gambling Prohibition and Enforcement Act, and H.R. 4411, the Goodlatte-Leach Internet Gambling Prohibition Act. Poker rights blogger Rich Muny, a board member of the Poker Players Alliance, rated Terry "F" on support for poker rights. Muny also included him on his "Leach List"—a list of anti-poker Representatives who are projected to be in tough reelection fights in 2008 (named for former Rep. Jim Leach (R-IA), sponsor of numerous efforts to ban online poker).

In 2009, Terry was named one of the most bipartisan members of the House of Representatives by The Hill and was named a "heavyweight" in telecommunications and media policy in the 111th Congress.

While running for reelection in 2010, Terry, who had previously been a strong supporter of privatizing Social Security, came out against it. He signed a pledge that he would "oppose any effort to privatize Social Security, in whole or in part."

Terry was initially a co-sponsor and supporter of the Stop Online Piracy Act. Under pressure from internet campaigns, he later rescinded his support for the bill. Terry voted in favor of the Cyber Intelligence Sharing and Protection Act (CISPA), a bill often compared to SOPA by its critics.

Terry has voted to repeal the Affordable Care Act, also known as Obamacare.

In 2013, Terry introduced a bill to grant approval for the northern portion of the Keystone Pipeline to Canada.

=== Controversy ===
During the United States federal government shutdown of 2013, Terry refused to give up his salary. He was asked if he would continue to collect his paychecks and replied, "dang straight". He said that he needed his paycheck to pay for his "nice house" and his child's college education, adding that "we cannot handle it. Giving our paycheck away when you still worked and earned it? That's just not going to fly." He later apologized for the statement and said he would put his salary on hold. Terry voted to pass a clean CR and end the government shutdown.

=== Committee assignments ===
- Committee on Energy and Commerce
  - Subcommittee on Commerce, Manufacturing and Trade (Chair)
  - Subcommittee on Communications and Technology
  - Subcommittee on Energy and Power

=== Caucuses and other memberships ===
- Impact Aid Coalition – Co-chair
- Republican Main Street Partnership
- Congressional Arts Caucus – member
- Spina Bifida Caucus
- Congressional Taskforce on Alzheimers
- Physical Fitness Caucus
- House Rural Health Care Coalition
- Humanities Council
- TRIO Caucus
- Meth Caucus – Co-Chair
- Rural Caucus
- Coal Caucus
- Natural Gas Caucus
- Hockey Caucus
- Intellectual Property Caucus
- Pro-Life Caucus
- Sportsmen's Caucus
- Congressional Cement Caucus

== Personal life ==
Terry lives in West Omaha with his wife, Robyn, and their three sons, Nolan, Ryan, and Jack. He is of Russian Jewish descent through his maternal grandmother.

U.S. House of Representatives
Preceded by Jon Christensen	Member of the U.S. House of Representatives from Nebraska's 2nd congressional district 1999–2015	Succeeded by Brad Ashford
U.S. order of precedence (ceremonial)
Preceded by Todd Tiahrt as Former U.S. Representative	Order of precedence of the United States as Former U.S. Representative	Succeeded by Jeff Fortenberry as Former U.S. Representative
