= 2002 United States House of Representatives elections in Nebraska =

- November 5, 2002

All 3 Nebraska seats to the United States House of Representatives
	Majority party	Minority party
Party	Republican	Democratic
Last election	3	0
Seats won	3	0
Seat change	Steady	Steady
Popular vote	386,869	46,843
Percentage	81.65%	9.89%
Swing	▲10.43%	▼16.18%

The 2002 United States House of Representatives elections in Nebraska were held on November 5, 2002, to elect the state of Nebraska's three members to the United States House of Representatives. All three incumbent Republican members of Congress were re-elected by wide margins.

== Overview ==
2002 United States House of Representatives elections in Nebraska
Party	Votes	Percentage	Seats	+/–
Republican	386,869	81.65%	3	Steady
Democratic	46,843	9.89%	0	Steady
Libertarian	36,866	7.78%	0	—
Green	3,236	0.68%	0	—
Totals	473,814	100.00%	3	—

== District 1 ==
2002 Nebraska's 1st congressional district election
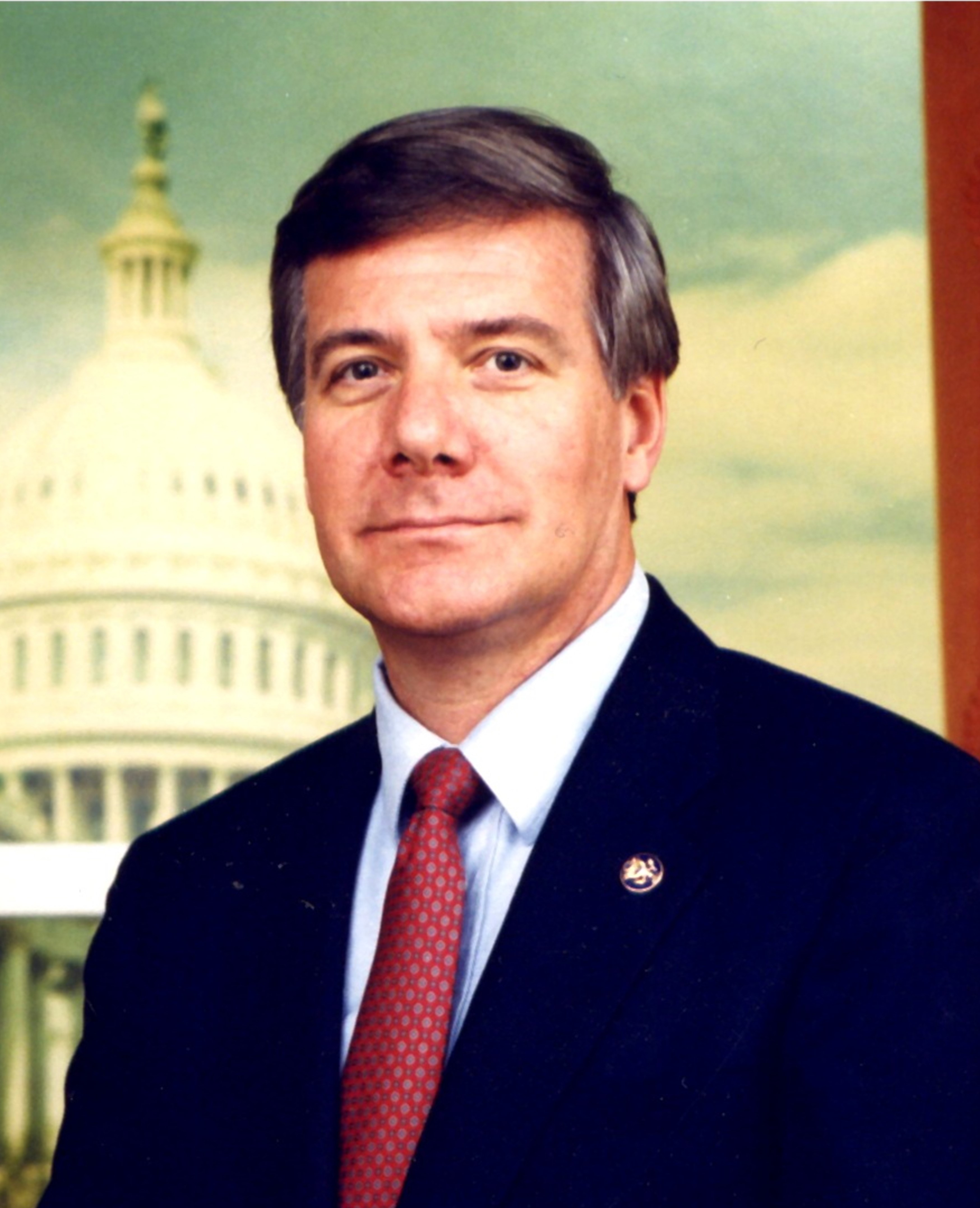

Nominee	Doug Bereuter	Robert Eckerson
Party	Republican	Libertarian
Popular vote	133,013	22,831
Percentage	85.3%	14.7%
U.S. Representative before election
Doug Bereuter
Republican
Elected U.S. Representative
Doug Bereuter
Republican

Incumbent Republican Congressman Doug Bereuter ran for re-election. He faced no major-party challengers and was opposed only by Libertarian nominee Robert Eckerson in the general election. Bereuter defeated Eckerson in a landslide, winning 85 percent of the vote. Bereuter ultimately did not serve out his full term; he declined to seek re-election in 2004 and resigned on August 31, 2004.

=== Republican primary ===
==== Candidates ====
- Doug Bereuter, incumbent U.S. Representative

==== Results ====
Republican primary results
Party	Candidate	Votes	%
Republican	Doug Bereuter (inc.)	40,911	100.00%
Total votes		40,911	100.00%

=== Libertarian primary ===
==== Candidates ====
- Robert Eckerson, immigration attorney

==== Results ====
Libertarian primary results
Party	Candidate	Votes	%
Libertarian	Robert Eckerson	83	100.00%
Total votes		83	100.00%

=== General election ===
==== Predictions ====
Source	Ranking	As of
Sabato's Crystal Ball	Safe R	November 4, 2002
New York Times	Safe R	October 14, 2002

==== Candidates ====
- Doug Bereuter (Republican)
- Robert Eckerson (Libertarian)

==== Results ====
2002 Nebraska's 1st congressional district general election results
Party	Candidate	Votes	%
Republican	Doug Bereuter (inc.)	133,013	85.35%
Libertarian	Robert Eckerson	22,831	14.65%
Total votes		155,844	100.00%
Republican hold			

== District 2 ==
2002 Nebraska's 2nd congressional district election
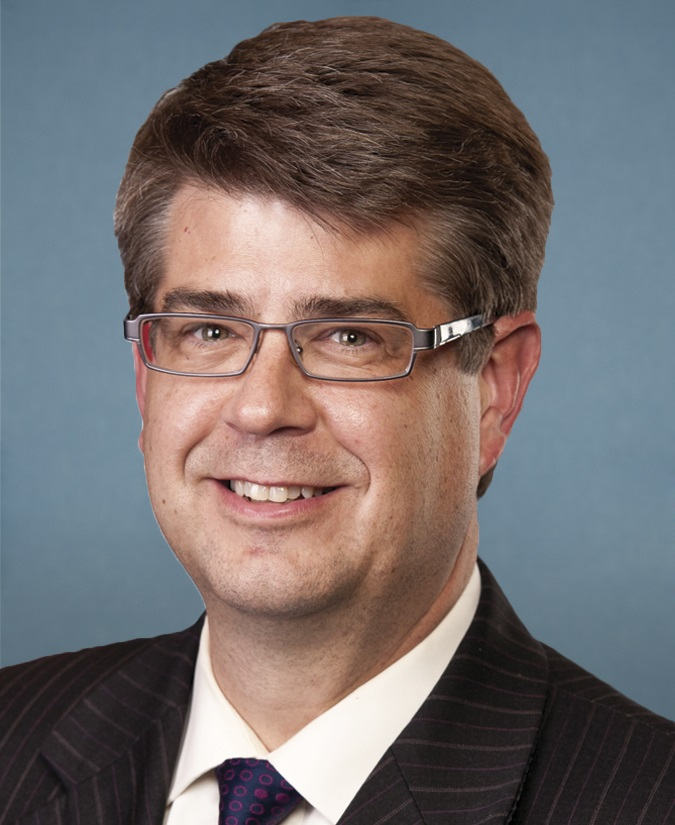

Nominee	Lee Terry	Jim Simon
Party	Republican	Democratic
Popular vote	89,917	46,843
Percentage	63.3%	33.0%
U.S. Representative before election
Lee Terry
Republican
Elected U.S. Representative
Lee Terry
Republican

Incumbent Republican Congressman Lee Terry ran for re-election to a third term. He was challenged by businessman Jim Simon, the Democratic nominee, and two third-party candidates. Terry ultimately defeated Simon in a landslide, winning 63 percent of the vote to Simon's 33 percent.

=== Republican primary ===
==== Candidates ====
- Lee Terry, incumbent U.S. Representative

==== Results ====
Republican primary results
Party	Candidate	Votes	%
Republican	Lee Terry (inc.)	24,193	100.00%
Total votes		24,193	100.00%

=== Democratic primary ===
==== Candidates ====
- Jim Simon, businessman

==== Results ====
Democratic primary results
Party	Candidate	Votes	%
Democratic	Jim Simon	16,377	100.00%
Total votes		16,377	100.00%

=== Libertarian primary ===
==== Candidates ====
- Dave Stock

==== Results ====
Libertarian primary results
Party	Candidate	Votes	%
Libertarian	Dave Stock	73	100.00%
Total votes		73	100.00%

=== General election ===
==== Predictions ====
Source	Ranking	As of
Sabato's Crystal Ball	Safe R	November 4, 2002
New York Times	Safe R	October 14, 2002

==== Candidates ====
- Lee Terry (Republican)
- Jim Simon (Democratic)
- Doug Paterson (Green)
- Dave Stock (Libertarian)

==== Polling ====
Poll source	Date(s) administered	Sample size	Margin of error	Lee Terry (R)	Jim Simon (D)	Doug Paterson (G)	Dave Stock (L)	Other / Undecided
Midwest Survey and Research	October 23–28, 2002	604 (LV)	± 3.98%	54%	33%	3%	1%	9%

==== Results ====
2002 Nebraska's 2nd congressional district general election results
Party	Candidate	Votes	%
Republican	Lee Terry (inc.)	89,917	63.32%
Democratic	Jim Simon	46,843	32.98%
Green	Doug Paterson	3,236	2.28%
Libertarian	Dave Stock	2,018	1.42%
Total votes		142,014	100.00%
Republican hold			

== District 3 ==
2002 Nebraska's 3rd congressional district election
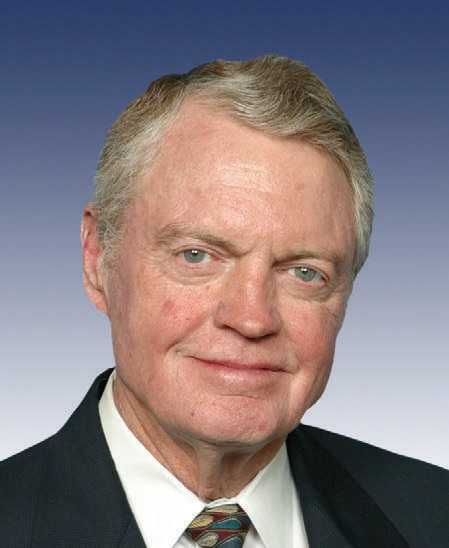

Nominee	Tom Osborne	Jerry Hickman
Party	Republican	Libertarian
Popular vote	163,939	12,017
Percentage	93.2%	6.8%
U.S. Representative before election
Tom Osborne
Republican
Elected U.S. Representative
Tom Osborne
Republican

Incumbent Republican Congressman Tom Osborne ran for re-election to a second term. No Democratic candidates filed to run against him, and he was challenged only by Libertarian nominee Jerry Hickman, a U.S. Marine Corps veteran. Osborne defeated Hickman in a landslide, winning re-election with 93 percent of the vote.

=== Republican primary ===
==== Candidates ====
- Tom Osborne, incumbent U.S. Representative

==== Results ====
Republican primary results
Party	Candidate	Votes	%
Republican	Tom Osborne	78,297	100.00%
Total votes		78,297	100.00%

=== Libertarian primary ===
==== Candidates ====
- Jerry Hickman, U.S. Marine Corps veteran, 1998 and 2000 Libertarian candidate for Congress

==== Results ====
Libertarian primary results
Party	Candidate	Votes	%
Libertarian	Jerry Hickman	73	100.00%
Total votes		73	100.00%

=== General election ===
==== Predictions ====
Source	Ranking	As of
Sabato's Crystal Ball	Safe R	November 4, 2002
New York Times	Safe R	October 14, 2002

==== Candidates ====
- Tom Osborne (Republican)
- Jerry Hickman (Libertarian)

==== Results ====
2002 Nebraska's 3rd congressional district general election results
Party	Candidate	Votes	%
Republican	Tom Osborne (inc.)	163,939	93.17%
Libertarian	Jerry Hickman	12,017	6.83%
Total votes		175,956	100.00%
Republican hold			

== See also ==
- 2002 United States House of Representatives elections
