= Tanya Cook =

Guamanian-American politician

Member of the Nebraska Legislature from the 13th district
- In office 2009–2017
- Preceded by: Lowen Kruse
- Succeeded by: Justin Wayne (politician)

Personal details
- Born: November 9, 1964 (age 61) Agana, Guam
- Party: Democratic
- Education: Georgetown University

Tanya Cook (born November 9, 1964, in Agana, Guam) is a politician from the U.S. state of Nebraska. She represented the 13th district, made up of part of Omaha, in the Nebraska Legislature.

== State legislature ==
In 2008, Cook was elected to represent the 13th Nebraska legislative district. During her first term, from 2009 to 2013, she served at various times on the General Affairs, Natural Resources, State-Tribal Relations, Urban Affairs, and Health and Human Services Committees, and was Vice Chair of the Business and Labor Committee from 2011 to 2012. Along with Brenda Council of the 11th legislative district, she was one of the first black women elected to the Nebraska Legislature. Cook was re-elected in 2012.

== Professional career ==
Cook is the President of City Girl Communications, a public relations consulting firm. From 1999 to 2006, she served as the Director of Urban Affairs for Governor Mike Johanns. Cook received her bachelor's degree from Georgetown University for international business in 1986. She then went on to the University of Nebraska Lincoln in 1994 received her M.A. in training and development.
