= Dan Lynch (politician) =

American politician (1929–2026)

Member of the Nebraska Legislature from the 13th district
- In office January 9, 1985 – January 3, 2001
- Preceded by: Dave Newell
- Succeeded by: Lowen Kruse

Personal details
- Born: August 9, 1929 Omaha, Nebraska
- Died: March 17, 2026 (aged 96) Omaha, Nebraska
- Party: Democratic
- Education: Loras College
- Occupation: Plumber

Daniel C. Lynch (August 9, 1929 – March 17, 2026) was a Democratic politician from Nebraska who served as a member of the Nebraska Legislature from the 13th district from 1985 to 2001 and on the Douglas County Commission from 1961 to 1981.

== Early life ==
Lynch was born in Omaha, Nebraska, in 1929. He graduated from Creighton Preparatory School and Loras College, and worked as a plumber, owning and operating his own heating and plumbing company. He unsuccessfully ran for the Omaha City Council in 1957, and was active within the Nebraska Democratic Party, serving as the president of the Nebraska Young Democrats from 1957 to 1958.

== Douglas County Commission ==
In 1961, Lynch was appointed to the Douglas County Board of Commissioners to replace former commissioner Walter X. Spellman in the 3rd district. He ran for election to a full term in 1964, and was challenged in the Democratic primary by businessman Harold Smith, bar owner Robert Rodgers, and produce processor Joseph Smith. Lynch ultimately won the primary, and faced former Police Commissioner Richard Jensen, the Republican nominee, in the general election. Lynch defeated Jepsen by a wide margin.

Lynch ran for re-election in 1968. He won the Democratic primary over former fireman Bryce Maples, and faced Republican Walter Duda, a businessman and farmer, in the general election. Though Republicans performed well in the county, Lynch narrowly defeated Duda to win re-election.

During the 1969 legislative session, the legislature converted Douglas County Commission elections to at-large elections beginning in 1970. In 1972, Lynch ran for re-election, seeking one of the two at-large commission seats up for election that year. He ran in a crowded Democratic primary, including former Douglas County Democratic Party Chairman William Berryman, former County Commissioner Martin Jensen, former State Treasurer Richard Larsen, and State Senator David Stahmer. Lynch placed first in the primary, with retired engineer Pat Pattavina placing second; in the general election, they were opposed by the two Republican nominees, State Senator P. J. Morgan and former Municipal Court Judge Simon A. Simon. Lynch and Morgan praised each other during the campaign, and both won the general election.

In 1976, Lynch ran for re-election. He faced intra-party opposition over his vote for Republican Michael Albert as chairman of the board of commissioners. Former State Senator Richard Fellman filed to run against Lynch in the Democratic primary. Both were ultimately nominated, and they won the general election. Lynch served as president of the National Association of Counties from 1976 to 1977.

Lynch ran for a sixth term in 1980, and was nominated at the Democratic primary, along with County Surveyor Lou Lamberty. In the general election, they faced businessman Steve McCollister and Patrick Haller. Lynch and McCollister narrowly won. He resigned on December 15, 1981, after he was named the vice president of consumer and governmental affairs of Blue Cross Blue Shield of Nebraska.

== Nebraska Legislature ==
In 1984, State Senator Dave Newell declined to seek re-election, and Lynch ran to succeed him in the 13th district. He ran against Walter Duda, a former State Senator whom he defeated in 1968; pharmacy owner Luke Coniglio; insurance agent Bob Garrett; and Northwestern Bell employee William Hoffman. Lynch won 46 percent of the vote in the primary, and advanced to the general election with Duda, who placed second with 35 percent. Lynch won the general election, defeating Duda with 55 percent of the vote.

During his first term in the legislature, motivated by the death of his son-in-law in a 1975 motorcycle accident, and his son's 1985 car accident, Lynch authored legislation that would mandate that motorcycle riders wear a helmet in the state. The bill narrowly passed the legislature, and was signed into law by Governor Kay Orr.

Lynch ran for re-election in 1988, and was challenged by Martin Hoer, a woodworker who attacked Lynch over the mandatory helmet law. He placed first in the primary by a wide margin, winning 82 percent of the vote to Hoer's 18 percent, and they advanced to the general election. Lynch defeated Hoer in a landslide, winning 81 percent of the vote.

In 1992, Lynch sought a third term. No candidates filed against him by the deadline, but environmental activist Tom Foster ran as a write-in candidate. Though Foster was expected to advance to the general election with Lynch, he did not receive enough votes to do so, and Lynch was re-elected unopposed.

Lynch ran for re-election in 1996, and was challenged by Lowen Kruse, a retired United Methodist pastor, and Glenn Freeman, a Republican Party activist, both of whom attacked him for his absence from the district. Lynch placed first in the primary by a wide margin, receiving 55 percent of the vote to Kruse's 23 percent and Freeman's 21 percent. He and Kruse advanced to the general election, which Lynch won, defeating Kruse, 56–44 percent.

In 2000, Lynch ran for a fifth term, and was challenged by Kruse, in a rematch of their 1996 contest, and attorney Ralph Peppard. Kruse and Peppard alleged that Lynch lived outside the district, which Lynch disputed. Lynch won 49 percent of the vote in the primary election, and proceeded to the general election with Kruse, who won 38 percent. On election night, Lynch appeared to narrowly lose to Kruse, and once all the votes were tallied, Lynch lost, receiving 47 percent of the vote to Kruse's 53 percent.

== Death ==
Lynch died on March 17, 2016.
