= James Goll =

American politician (1927–1992)

Member of the Nebraska Legislature from the 16th district
- In office January 5, 1981 – January 7, 1987
- Preceded by: Walter George
- Succeeded by: Frank Korshoj

Personal details
- Born: April 10, 1927 Tekamah, Nebraska
- Died: December 4, 1992 (aged 65) Tekamah, Nebraska
- Party: Republican
- Spouse: Doran Lorenz (m. 1950)
- Children: 3 (James, Charles, Sarah)
- Education: University of Nebraska (B.S.)
- Occupation: Public accountant, car dealer

James E. Goll (April 10, 1927 – December 4, 1992) was a Republican politician and car dealer from Nebraska who served as a member of the Nebraska Legislature from the 16th district from 1981 to 1987.

== Early career ==
Goll was born in Tekamah, Nebraska, and graduated from Tekamah High School. He served in the U.S. Naval Reserve during World War II, and was stationed on the Enterprise. Goll later attended the University of Nebraska, receiving his bachelor's degree in accounting in 1950. While a university student, Goll was a roommate and friend of future Congressman and Governor Charles Thone. Goll owned Tekamah Motors, Inc., an automobile dealership, and served on the Tekamah Board of Education following his election in 1957.

== Nebraska Legislature ==
In 1981, State Senator Walter George resigned, and Thone appointed Goll to serve out the remainder of George's term in the 16th district, which included Burt, Cuming, Thurston, and Washington counties. Goll was sworn in on January 5, 1981.

Goll ran for re-election in 1982, and was challenged by Shirley Schmidt, a Democratic Party activist and farmer, and Naomi Drummond, a member of the Thurston County Joint Planning Commission. In the primary, Goll placed first by a wide margin, winning 50 percent of the vote, and advanced to the general election against Schmidt, who narrowly placed second with 26 percent of the vote to Brummond's 23 percent. Goll defeated Schmidt in a landslide, winning 59–41 percent.

In 1986, Goll declined to seek re-election to a second full term.

== Death ==
Goll died on December 4, 1992.
