= Duke Snyder (Nebraska politician) =

American politician

Member of the Nebraska Legislature from the 14th district
- In office January 5, 1971 – January 8, 1975
- Preceded by: Florence Reynolds
- Succeeded by: Thomas Fitzgerald

Personal details
- Born: November 25, 1941 (age 84) Quincy, Illinois
- Party: Republican
- Spouse: Judith Ann Probst (m. 1964; div. 1974)
- Children: 3 (Julie Marie, Diane Beth, Kyle Lin)
- Education: Vallejo Junior College, University of the Philippines, University of Omaha
- Occupation: Advertising, newscaster

Merlin "Duke" Snyder (born November 25, 1941) is a Republican politician and businessman who served as a member of the Nebraska Legislature from the 14th district from 1971 to 1975.

== Early life ==
Snyder was born in Quincy, Illinois, and grew up in Omaha, Nebraska. He attended Vallejo Junior College in Vallejo, California, and worked as a journalist at radio station in Austin, Minnesota, and then at KMTV-TV and KBON.

== Nebraska Legislature ==
In 1970, Snyder ran for the state legislature from the 14th district, challenging incumbent State Senator Florence Reynolds for re-election. In the nonpartisan primary, he was joined by farmer Lee Sesemann, real estate broker Wayne Lowden, retired railroad worker Walter Hower, and barber Byril Brown. Snyder narrowly placed first in the primary, receiving 28 percent of the vote to Reynolds's 27 percent, and they advanced to the general election. Snyder defeated Reynolds in a landslide, winning 63 percent of the vote to Reynolds's 37 percent.

Snyder announced that he would switch to the Democratic Party in 1973, noting that the Republican Party was "overly conservative" on some policy matters, and that he might be "more of a conservative Democrat than anything else." However, several months later, Snyder announced that he would not switch his registration, after talking to "older and wiser" people. He declined to seek re-election in 1974.

== Post-legislative career ==
After Snyder left the legislature, he was unemployed, and was sentenced to a ten-day jail sentence for failure to pay child support. Later that year, he moved to Moline, Illinois, where he worked as a newscaster for WQAD-TV under the name "Eric Adams" and enrolled at the Palmer College of Chiropractic in Davenport, Iowa. By the late 1970s, Snyder had returned to Omaha, and was working as an administrative assistant at Tower Furniture and Appliance in Council Bluffs. He was later appointed the executive vice president of the Nebraska City Chamber of Commerce and the president of the Southeast Nebraska United Chambers of Commerce, but resigned both upon leaving the area in 1980.
