= Kent Rogert =

American politician (born 1972)

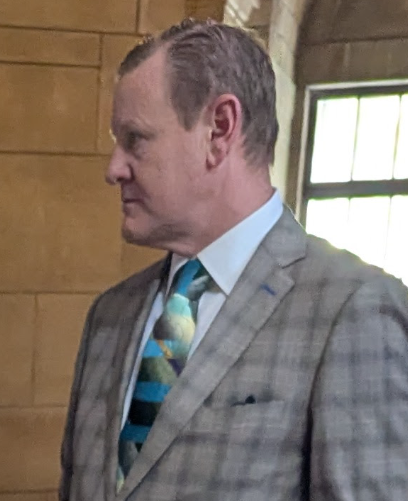

Member of the Nebraska Legislature from the 16th district
- In office 2007–2011
- Preceded by: Matt Connealy
- Succeeded by: Lydia Brasch

Personal details
- Born: September 15, 1972 (age 54) Blair, Nebraska, U.S.
- Party: Democratic
- Education: University of Nebraska–Lincoln

Kent Rogert (born September 15, 1972) is a former member of the Nebraska Legislature from Tekamah, Nebraska, United States.

Born in Blair, Nebraska, he graduated from Tekamah-Herman High School in 1991. He graduated from the University of Nebraska–Lincoln in 1995.

He was elected to the Legislature in 2006 serving Nebraska's 16th legislative district. He served on the General Affairs, Urban Affairs, Judiciary, Rules, and State-Tribal Relations committees.

Previous to joining the Nebraska Legislature he was employed by Garst Seed Company.

Preceded by Matt Connealy	Nebraska state senator-district 16; 2007–2011	Succeeded by Lydia Brasch
