= Jim Smith (Nebraska politician) =

American politician

Member of the Nebraska Legislature from the 14th district
- In office 2011–2018
- Preceded by: Tim Gay
- Succeeded by: John Arch

Personal details
- Born: February 9, 1959 (age 67) Pensacola, Florida, U.S.
- Party: Republican

Jim Smith (born February 9, 1959) is a Nebraska business leader and former American politician who served as a member of the unicameral Nebraska Legislature. He was born in Pensacola, Florida, and resides in Papillion, Nebraska.

== Early life ==
Jim Smith graduated from University of West Florida in 1984 with B.A. in Accounting and from Creighton University in 1996 with an MBA. Prior to public office, he worked in investor-owned and public-power utility operations. Following his corporate career in electric and gas utilities, Smith became a small business owner and investor and was elected from 2010 to 2018 to represent the 14th district of the Nebraska Legislature. He held positions on the Natural Resources Committee and Business & Labor Committee. Later, Smith would become Chair of the Transportation and Telecommunications Committee and the Revenue Committee. Smith's legislative priorities included energy, transportation and fiscal policy. Smith was the state chairman for the American Legislative Exchange Council and served on the organization's nation board of directors.

== Continuing career ==
After leaving elected office, Smith became CEO and President of Blueprint Nebraska, a strategic Nebraska think tank. Following his time at Blueprint Nebraska, Smith continued providing business and policy insights on several corporate boards and to nonprofit think tanks such as the American Legislative Exchange Council, Private Enterprise Advisor Council. In recent years, Smith returned to the private sector in his role as the Executive Vice President of Aquila Health.

== See also ==
- Nebraska Legislature

Preceded by Tim Gay	Nebraska state senator – District 14; 2010–2018	Incumbent
