= Thomas Fitzgerald (Nebraska politician) =

American politician (1920–2007)

Member of the Nebraska Legislature from the 14th district
- In office January 8, 1975 – July 13, 1981
- Preceded by: Duke Snyder
- Succeeded by: Walter Duda

Personal details
- Born: February 29, 1920 Omaha, Nebraska
- Died: March 13, 2007 (aged 87) Omaha, Nebraska
- Party: Democratic
- Spouse: Lorraine (m. 1948)
- Children: 3 (Linda, Thomas III, Gayle)
- Occupation: Mail carrier

Thomas S. Fitzgerald Jr. (February 29, 1920 – March 13, 2007) was a Democratic politician from Nebraska who served as a member of the Nebraska Legislature from the 14th district from 1975 to 1981.

== Early life ==
Fitzgerald was born in Omaha, Nebraska, in 1920, and graduated from Omaha South High School. He later served in the U.S. Army during World War II, and worked as a mail carrier for thirty years upon returning to Omaha.

== Nebraska Legislature ==
In 1974, State Senator Duke Snyder declined to seek re-election in the East Omaha-based 14th district, and Fitzgerald ran to succeed him. In the nonpartisan primary, he faced Mal Adams, a student at Dana College; James Keillor, a nursing home owner; W. B. Kurtz, a businessman; and Virginia Patterson and Peggy Welch Varner, who were both homemakers. Fitzgerald placed first in the primary election, receiving 25 percent of the vote to Keillor's 22 percent, and they advanced to the general election. Fitzgerald defeated Keillor, winning 58 percent of the vote to Keillor's 42 percent.

Fitzgerald ran for re-election in 1978, and faced four opponents: businessman Walter Duda, U.S. Air Force veteran Jackson Graham, Ku Klux Klan recruiter Herschel Nelson, and businessman Theodore Strasser. Fitzgerald narrowly placed first in the primary, winning 35 percent of the vote and receiving 2 more votes than Duda, who placed second. They advanced to the general election, where Fitzgerald won by a slim margin, receiving 52 percent of the vote to Duda's 48 percent.

== Post-legislative career ==
Governor Charles Thone appointed Fitzgerald to the state Liquor Control Commission in 1981, and he resigned from the legislature on July 13, 1981. He stepped down from the commission in 1983 when Governor Bob Kerrey declined to re-appoint him.

== Death and legacy ==
In 1981, the state legislature established the Thomas Fitzgerald Veterans Home in West Omaha, and Fitzgerald routinely visited veterans at the home. The legislature voted relocated the home to Bellevue, and over the Fitzgerald family's opposition, voted against transferring the name to the new facility, instead naming it the Eastern Nebraska Veterans Home.

Fitzgerald died on March 13, 2007.
