= Walter George (Nebraska politician) =

American politician (1929–1996)

Member of the Nebraska Legislature from the 16th district
- In office January 8, 1975 – December 31, 1980
- Preceded by: Blair Richendifer
- Succeeded by: James Goll

Personal details
- Born: April 23, 1929 Gudensberg, Germany
- Died: December 23, 1996 (aged 67) Blair, Nebraska, U.S.
- Party: Republican
- Spouse: Ann Harms (m. 1955, divorced)
- Children: 2 (Eric, Stephen)
- Education: University of Mainz, Heidelberg University, Marburg University, University of Nebraska, University of North Carolina at Chapel Hill
- Occupation: Political science professor

Walter George (April 23, 1929 – December 23, 1996) was a German-American political scientist and Republican politician from Nebraska who served as a member of the Nebraska Legislature from the 16th district from 1975 to 1980.

== Early life ==
George was born in Gudensberg, Germany, in 1929. He attended the University of Mainz, Heidelberg University, and Marburg University, and received a Fulbright scholarship to attend the University of Nebraska in 1954. George graduated with his master's degree in political science in 1956, and taught at Luther College in Wahoo, Nebraska, before returning to Germany to continue his studies at Heidelberg. He attended the University of North Carolina at Chapel Hill and taught at Saint Mary's School. He moved to Blair, Nebraska, in 1966, and taught at Dana College. George was elected to the Blair City Council in 1972.

== Nebraska Legislature ==
In 1974, George ran for the state legislature from the 16th district, challenging incumbent State Senator Blair Richendifer for re-election. George placed second in the primary election, receiving 44 percent of the vote to Richendifer's 56 percent. In the general election, George narrowly defeated Richendifer, winning 53 percent of the vote.

George ran for re-election in 1978. He was challenged by Hollis Stabler, a consultant to the Winnebago Reservation. George, who left Dana College several years prior, was searching for a job, and anticipated that he might resign from the legislature and drop out of the race, so he solicited his aide, Gregory Mossman, to file for the race, as well. George placed first in the primary by a wide margin, winning 58 percent of the vote to Moseman's 28 percent and Stabler's 14 percent. While Moseman initially planned on dropping out of the race if George remained in the legislature, he opted to continue his campaign, while George "did little campaigning." George narrowly defeated Moseman, winning 52 percent of the vote to Moseman's 48 percent.

== Post-legislative career ==
In 1980, George announced that he would resign from the legislature, after he was appointed as the regional director of the Old West Regional Commission's trade office in Frankfurt, West Germany. He resigned on December 31, 1980.

Federal funding for the commission lapsed in 1981, and the state of Nebraska initially continued to support George's salary. George later headed the state of Florida's European Office in Frankfurt. In 1987, he briefly worked in Atlanta as the Saarland state's representative, and returned to Blair, Nebraska, in 1988 when he retired.

== Death ==
George died on December 23, 1996.
