= Bud Robinson =

American politician (1928–2011)

Member of the Nebraska Legislature from the 16th district
- In office January 9, 1991 – January 6, 1999
- Preceded by: Frank Korshoj
- Succeeded by: Matt Connealy

Personal details
- Born: September 13, 1928 Blair, Nebraska
- Died: May 7, 2011 (aged 82) Blair, Nebraska
- Party: Republican
- Spouse: Janice Vaage
- Children: 5 (Kristen, Thomas, Richard, David, Stephen)
- Education: Dana College (B.A.); University of Omaha (M.S.); University of Nebraska (Ph.D.)
- Occupation: Teacher

Military service
- Allegiance: United States
- Branch/service: United States Army
- Years of service: 1950–1952
- Unit: 45th Infantry Division
- Battles/wars: Korean War

Clifton N. "Bud" Robinson (September 13, 1928 – May 7, 2011) was a Republican politician from Nebraska who served as a member of the Nebraska Legislature from the 16th district from 1991 to 1999.

== Early life ==
Robinson was born in Blair, Nebraska, in 1928, and graduated from Blair High School in 1945. He graduated from Dana College in 1950, and served in the U.S. Army from 1950 to 1952 in the 45th Infantry Division in the Korean War. Robinson then attended the University of Omaha, receiving his master's degree in 1957, and the University of Nebraska, graduating with his doctor of philosophy in 1960. He worked as an educator and school administer, serving on the board of governors of Metropolitan Technical Community College from 1976 to 1982.

== Nebraska Legislature ==
In 1990, Robinson announced that he would run for the Nebraska Legislature to succeed State Senator Frank Korshoj in the 16th district, which included Burt, Cuming, Thurston, and Washington counties in norteastern Nebraska. In the nonpartisan primary, he faced security guard Larry Banks, farmer Naomi Brummond, Nebraska Indian Community College official Robert Clifton, teacher Beverly Peterson, and retired FBI agent George Robb. Robinson placed first in the primary, winning 38 percent of the vote, and advanced to the general election with Robb, who placed second with 20 percent. Robinson defeated Robb in the general election, winning 57–43 percent.

Robinson ran for re-election in 1994, and was challenged by meatpacker Larry Marvin. He placed first in the primary election by a wide margin, winning 79 percent of the vote to Marvin's 21 percent, and won the general election by a similar margin, defeating Marvin, 78–22 percent.

In 1998, Robinson declined to seek a third term.

== Death ==
Robinson died on May 7, 2011.
