= Ron Withem =

American politician (1946–2020)

Member of the Nebraska Legislature from the 14th district
- In office March 30, 1983 – November 24, 1997
- Preceded by: Tom Doyle
- Succeeded by: Nancy Thompson

Speaker of the Nebraska Legislature
- In office January 5, 1994 – November 24, 1997
- Preceded by: Dennis Baack
- Succeeded by: Doug Kristensen

Personal details
- Born: Ronald Eugene Withem; June 9, 1946 Missouri Valley, Iowa
- Died: May 28, 2020 (aged 73) Papillion, Nebraska
- Party: Democratic

Ronald Eugene Withem (June 9, 1946 – May 28, 2020) was an American politician who served in the Nebraska Legislature from the 14th district from 1983 to 1997. He was appointed to the legislature on March 30, 1983, upon the resignation of Tom Doyle. Following the resignation of Dennis Baack as Speaker, Withem was narrowly elected as his successor on January 5, 1994, defeating George Coordsen by a 25–24 vote. Withem served as Speaker from 1994 to 1997. Withem resigned from the legislature on November 24, 1997 to serve as a lobbyist for the University of Nebraska–Lincoln, replacing former legislative colleague Lee Rupp.

He died of Parkinson's disease on May 28, 2020, in Papillion, Nebraska at age 73.
