= Tim Gay =

American politician (born 1964)

Member of the Nebraska Legislature from the 14th district
- In office 2007–2011
- Preceded by: Nancy Thompson
- Succeeded by: Jim Smith

Personal details
- Born: July 9, 1964 (age 62) Columbus, Nebraska, U.S.
- Spouse: Tonee
- Children: 3
- Education: University of Nebraska–Lincoln (BS)
- Occupation: Politician, broker

Tim Gay (born July 9, 1964) is an American politician and broker who served in the Nebraska Legislature from 2007 to 2011, representing the 14th legislative district of Nebraska.

== Early life and education ==
Gay was born in Columbus, Nebraska, on July 9, 1964. He graduated from the University of Nebraska–Lincoln in 1987 with a Bachelor of Science.

== Career ==
Prior to entering politics, Gay worked as a grain broker for Commodity Traders Incorporated from 1987 to 1994. He served a similar position for Switzer Trading Company from 1994 to 1999. In 1999, Gay became the vice president of investment services with American National Bank, serving in that capacity both during and after his time in the Nebraska Legislature.

Gay served as president of the Eastern Nebraska Human Services Agency in 1998.

Prior to entering the Nebraska Legislature, Gay served as a member of the Sarpy County Board of Commissioners from 1994 to 2006.

In 2006, Gay ran for election to the Nebraska Legislature. He defeated Ian Hartfield in the general election with over 75% of the vote.

During his time in office, Gay served on the following committees:

- Health and Human Services Committee
- Transportation and Telecommunications Committee

Gay served from 2007 to 2011, representing the 14th legislative district of Nebraska. He did not seek re-election in 2010.

Gay is the president and founder of Catalyst Public Affairs.

== Political positions ==
Gay supports exceptions for abortion in the event of rape or incest, or when the woman's life is in danger. He does not believe that Nebraska should recognize civil unions between same-sex couples. Gay supports the practice of the death penalty in Nebraska.

Gay received a 0% rating from Planned Parenthood Voters of Nebraska in 2010. That same year, he received ratings of 100 and 100% from the Nebraska Chamber of Commerce & Industry and the Nebraska League of Conservation Voters respectively.

== Personal life ==
Gay is married and has three children. He currently resides in Papillion, Nebraska.

Gay is Catholic. He is not affiliated with any political party.

== Electoral history ==
2010 Nebraska Legislature District 14 general election
Party	Candidate	Votes	%
Nonpartisan	Tim Gay	8,289	75.42
Nonpartisan	Ian Hartfield	2,701	24.58
Total votes		10,990	100.0

Nebraska Legislature
Preceded by Nancy Thompson	Member of the Nebraska Legislature from the 14th district 2007–2011	Succeeded by Jim Smith
