= Blair Richendifer =

American politician (1928–1999)

Member of the Nebraska Legislature from the 16th district
- In office May 10, 1972 – January 8, 1975
- Preceded by: Claire Holmquist
- Succeeded by: Walter George

Personal details
- Born: November 11, 1928 Bladen, Nebraska
- Died: November 23, 1999 (aged 71) Kirkland, Washington
- Party: Democratic
- Spouse: Marjorie A. Kuhn (m. 1951)
- Children: 5 (Vicky, Paula, Martin, Alisa, Mary)
- Education: Hastings College; St. Louis College of Mortuary Science
- Occupation: Funeral director, furniture store owner

Blair K. Richendifer (November 11, 1928 – November 23, 1999) was a Democratic politician from Nebraska who served as a member of the Nebraska Legislature from the 16th district from 1972 to 1975.

== Early life ==
Richendifer was born in Bladen, Nebraska, in 1928. He attended Bladen High School and attended Hastings College and the St. Louis College of Mortuary Science. Richendifer settled in Walthill, where he owned and operated a funeral home and furniture store. He served as chairman of the Thurston County Democratic Party and as mayor of Walthill.

== Nebraska Legislature ==
On April 26, 1972, State Senator Claire Holmquist unexpectedly died, and Governor J. James Exon appointed Richendifer to serve as the senator from the 16th district until a special election could be held later in the year.

Richendifer ran in the ensuing special election, and was challenged by fellow Democrat Charles Brodersen, a farmer, and Republican Roy Brown, a former Blair city administrator and city councilman. Because the vacancy occurred too close to the May primary election, all candidates appeared on the general election ballot. He narrowly won re-election, receiving 36 percent of the vote to Brodersen's 34 percent and Brown's 30 percent.

In 1974, Richendifer ran for a full term, and was challenged by Blair City Councilman Walter George. In the primary election, Richendifer placed first, winning 56 percent of the vote to George's 44 percent. They advanced to the general election, which George narrowly won, defeating Richendifer, 53–47 percent.

== Post-legislative career ==
In 1976, Richendifer ran for the Nebraska Public Service Commission from the 3rd district. He faced restaurant owner Donald Jensen in the Democratic primary, and lost by a wide margin, receiving 38 percent of the vote to Jensen's 62 percent.

Richendifer retired to Issaquah, Washington, in 1983, for the milder climate and to be closer to several of his children.

== Death ==
Richendifer died on November 23, 1999.
