= Tom Doyle (Nebraska politician) =

American politician (1931–2022)

Thomas D. Doyle

Douglas County Engineer
- In office March 30, 1983 – August 6, 2022
- Preceded by: Lou Lamberty
- Succeeded by: Todd Pfitzer

Member of the Nebraska Legislature from the 14th district
- In office January 5, 1983 – March 30, 1983
- Preceded by: Walter Duda
- Succeeded by: Ron Withem

Personal details
- Born: March 3, 1931 Omaha, Nebraska
- Died: August 6, 2022 (aged 91) Omaha, Nebraska
- Party: Democratic
- Spouse: Anna Andrlik
- Children: 5 (Kathy, Tom, Mark, Kevin, Annette)
- Education: University of Omaha (B.S.) University of Nebraska (M.S.)
- Occupation: Laborer, engineer

Thomas D. "Tom" Doyle (March 3, 1931 – August 6, 2022) was a Democratic politician and administrative official from Nebraska who served as the Douglas County Engineer from 1983 to 2022. He briefly served in the Nebraska Legislature from the 14th district in 1983, and previously served as the Commissioner of the Nebraska Department of Labor and the State Engineer.

== Early life ==
Doyle was born in Omaha, Nebraska, and graduated from Omaha South High School and the University of Omaha. He worked as an engineer for Western Electric from 1956 to 1967, and graduated from the University of Nebraska with his master's degree in chemical engineering in 1959.

He ran for the Omaha School Board in 1964, and was nominated at the primary election, but lost in the general election. In 1965, Doyle ran for the Omaha City Council in the at-large election for seven seats, but placed eighteenth in the primary, and narrowly missed out on advancing to the general election.

In 1967, Doyle was appointed by Governor Norbert Tiemann as the Commissioner of the state Department of Labor. Following the election of J. James Exon as Governor in 1970, Exon appointed Doyle as the State Engineer and Director of the state Department of Roads. Doyle stepped down in 1977, and became the executive vice president of the Ready Mixed Concrete Company and the Lyman-Rickey Sand & Gravel Corporation in Omaha.

== State Legislature ==
In 1982, Doyle ran for the Nebraska Legislature in the 14th district, which was based in central Sarpy County. He faced two opponents in the nonpartisan primary: Ron Withem, a former aide to Congressman John J. Cavanaugh and an official with the Mechanical Contractors Association, and Alice Campbell, an anti-abortion activist. Doyle placed first in the primary with 43 percent of the vote, and advanced to the general election against Withem, who received 35 percent. The race between Doyle and Withem was close, with Doyle ultimately defeating Withem by 13 votes, which was affirmed by a recount.

== Douglas County Engineer ==
Two months into Doyle's term in the Legislature, he resigned to accept an appointment as the Douglas County Engineer. Withem was appointed by Governor Bob Kerrey as Doyle's successor.

Doyle ran for re-election in 1986, and was challenged by Republican nominee Jerald Schneider, an engineer. He was re-elected over Schneider by a wide margin, receiving 57 percent of the vote to Schneider's 43 percent. He was re-elected unopposed in 1990, 1994, 1998, 2002, 2006, 2010, 2014, and 2018.

Doyle declined to seek re-election in 2022, and died on August 6, 2022. At the time of his death, he was one of the longest-serving elected officials in county history.
