= Frank Korshoj =

American politician (1932–2024)

Member of the Nebraska Legislature from the 16th district
- In office January 7, 1987 – January 9, 1991
- Preceded by: James Goll
- Succeeded by: Bud Robinson

Personal details
- Born: October 17, 1932 Herman, Nebraska
- Died: February 1, 2024 (aged 91) Blair, Nebraska
- Party: Democratic
- Occupation: Businessman

Frank Korshoj (October 17, 1932 – February 1, 2024) was a Democratic politician from Nebraska who served as a member of the Nebraska Legislature from the 16th district from 1987 to 1991

== Early life ==
Korshoj was born in Herman, Nebraska, and graduated from Herman Public School in 1950. He worked with his father in the family's retail lumber business. In 1953, Korshoj was drafted into the United States Army and trained at Fort Riley before being stationed in Germany.

== Nebraska Legislature ==
In 1986, Korshoj ran for the Nebraska Legislature from the 16th district, which included Burt, Thurston, and Washington counties, and a small corner of Cuming County. In the nonpartisan primary election, Korshoj ran against Robert Blobaum, who owned a retail fertilizer business; Jerry Clark, a farmer and businessman; Kathleen Sorensen Severens, the coordinator of the Farm Crisis Hotline; Walter Thompson, a cattle feeder; and Kennard Mayor Al Todd. Korshoj placed first in the primary, winning 28 percent of the vote, and advanced to the general election with Severens, who placed second with 25 percent. In the general election, Korshoj defeated Severens by a wide margin, receiving 60 percent of the vote to her 40 percent.

Several months after Korshoj was sworn in, he announced that he would not seek a second term in 1990, and closed his campaign account.

He filed for re-election in 1990, but ultimately declined to run, describing himself as an "off-again, on again, gone again Finnigan."

== Death ==
Korshoj died on February 1, 2024.
