= Lydia Brasch =

American politician

Member of the Nebraska Legislature from the 16th district
- In office 2011–2019
- Preceded by: Kent Rogert
- Succeeded by: Ben Hansen

Personal details
- Born: July 14, 1953 (age 73) Lincoln, Nebraska
- Party: Republican

Lydia Brasch (born July 14, 1953) is an American businesswoman, farmer, and politician who served as a member of the Nebraska Legislature from the 16th district.

== Early life ==
Brasch was born in Lincoln, Nebraska. She graduated from Lincoln High School and University of Nebraska–Lincoln.

== Career ==
Brasch is a farmer and owns a marketing and design firm. Prior to her election to the legislature, she was a member of both the Nebraska State Fair Foundation and the Cuming County Fair Foundation.

=== State legislature ===
Brasch was elected in 2010 to represent the 16th Nebraska legislative district. She sat on the Agriculture, General Affairs, Revenue, Rules, and State-Tribal Relations committees. She is anti-abortion and in 2011, she sponsored and passed LB690, which required parental consent before a minor receives an abortion. She was unable to run for re-election in 2018 due to state mandated term limits.

Brasch sponsored the right to repair legislation in 2017 giving farmers access to the diagnostic software embedded in farm equipment by the manufacturers. The bill was indefinitely postponed after sitting over a year and a half after big technology representatives spoke during a hearing on the bill.
