= Robert E. Conot =

Robert Ernst Conot (June 25, 1929 – November 16, 2011) was an American journalist and historian. He is the author of a 1967 book on the Watts Riots (Rivers of Blood, Years of Darkness). The report caught the attention of the National Advisory Commission on Civil Disorders, which appointed him to edit the historical section of the commission's report. Conot is also known for a biography of Thomas Edison that was among the first works to take issue with the "Edison myth" (A Streak of Luck). He also wrote a comprehensive volume on the Nuremberg Trials, Justice at Nuremberg.

It was after his work on the Kerner Commission that Conot wrote American Odyssey: A Unique History of America Told Through the Life of a Great City (1974), a history of Detroit from its 1701 beginning until 1970, detailing the social and community struggles – problems and successes – of America's biggest boom town, until the begin of its fall.
