= Nancy Thompson (politician) =

American politician (born 1947)

Nancy Thompson (born 1947) is a former Nebraska state senator from Papillion, Nebraska in the Nebraska Legislature.

== Personal life ==
She was born October 26, 1947, in Sioux Falls, South Dakota and graduated from Washington High School in 1965. In 1969 she graduated from Creighton University and got her master's there in 1982. She is a current or former member of the board of directors for United Way of the Midlands, Great Plains Girl Scouts Council, Indian-Chicano Health Center, St. Columbkille Education Foundation, a member of the Greater Omaha Private Industry Council, League of Women Voters, and Papillion-La Vista Schools Foundation board of trustees.

== 2004 Election ==
Thompson ran unsuccessfully for Congress in 2004, losing to incumbent Rep. Lee Terry 61%-36%.

== State legislature ==
She was appointed to the legislature on November 26, 1997 to replace Ron Withem, who had resigned. She was elected in 1998 to represent the 14th Nebraska legislative district and reelected in 2002. She sat on the Appropriations, Executive Board, and Reference committees as well as being the vice chairperson of the Rules and the chairperson of the Building Maintenance committees. Since Nebraska voters passed Initiative Measure 415 in 2001 limiting state senators to two terms after 2001, she was unable to run for reelection barring a court challenge of the measure.

Preceded by Ron Withem	Nebraska state senator-district 14; 1997–2006	Succeeded by Tim Gay

== See also ==
- Nebraska Legislature
