= Matt Connealy =

American politician (born 1951)

Member of the Nebraska Legislature from the 16th district
- In office 1998–2007
- Preceded by: Bud Robinson
- Succeeded by: Kent Rogert

Personal details
- Born: December 11, 1951 (age 74) Oakland, Nebraska
- Party: Democratic
- Education: University of Nebraska–Lincoln

Matthew James "Matt" Connealy (born December 11, 1951) is a former member the Nebraska Legislature, and former executive director of the Nebraska Democratic Party.

== Personal life ==
Born in Oakland, Nebraska, he graduated from Decatur High School in 1970. He attended the University of St. Thomas in Saint Paul, Minnesota, and the University of Nebraska–Lincoln from 1970 to 1973.

== Career ==
He was elected in 1998 to represent the 16th Nebraska legislative district and reelected in 2002. He sat on the General Affairs committee and was vice chairperson of the Revenue, Urban Affairs, and Building Maintenance committees. Due to term limits approved by Nebraska voters in Initiative Measure 415 in 2001, state senators are limited to two terms, and Connealy was "termed out" in 2006.

== Campaigns and elections ==
He unsuccessfully ran for the United States House of Representatives in 2004 in Nebraska's 1st congressional district. Connealy won a competitive four-way primary on Tuesday, May 11, 2004 with 50.2% of the vote, defeating Janet Stewart, Charlie Matulka, and Phil Chase for the nomination. In the general election, Republican Jeff Fortenberry defeated State Senator Matt Connealy 54%-43%. Connealy won only two counties: Thurston and Burt.

In 2006, Connealy unsuccessfully sought elective office as Nebraska Public Service Commissioner for district 3. Connealy was defeated by Tim Schram 56%-44%.

Preceded by Bud Robinson	Nebraska state senator-district 16; 1998–2006	Succeeded by Kent Rogert
Preceded by Barry Rubin	Executive Director of Nebraska Democratic Party; 2007–2009	Succeeded by Jim Rogers
