= National Research Corporation =

US healthcare consumer data mining company

NRC Health, Inc.
- Trade name: NCR Health
- Formerly: National Research Corporation
- Type: Public
- Traded as: Nasdaq: NRC; Russell 2000 Component
- Founded: 1981; 45 years ago
- Headquarters: Lincoln, Nebraska, U.S.
- Key people: Michael D. Hays (CEO and director); Kevin R. Karas (CFO and principal accounting officer); (Dec. 31, 2012)
- Revenue: $92.59M (Dec. 31, 2013)
- Number of employees: 352 (Dec. 31, 2013)
- Website: nationalresearch.com

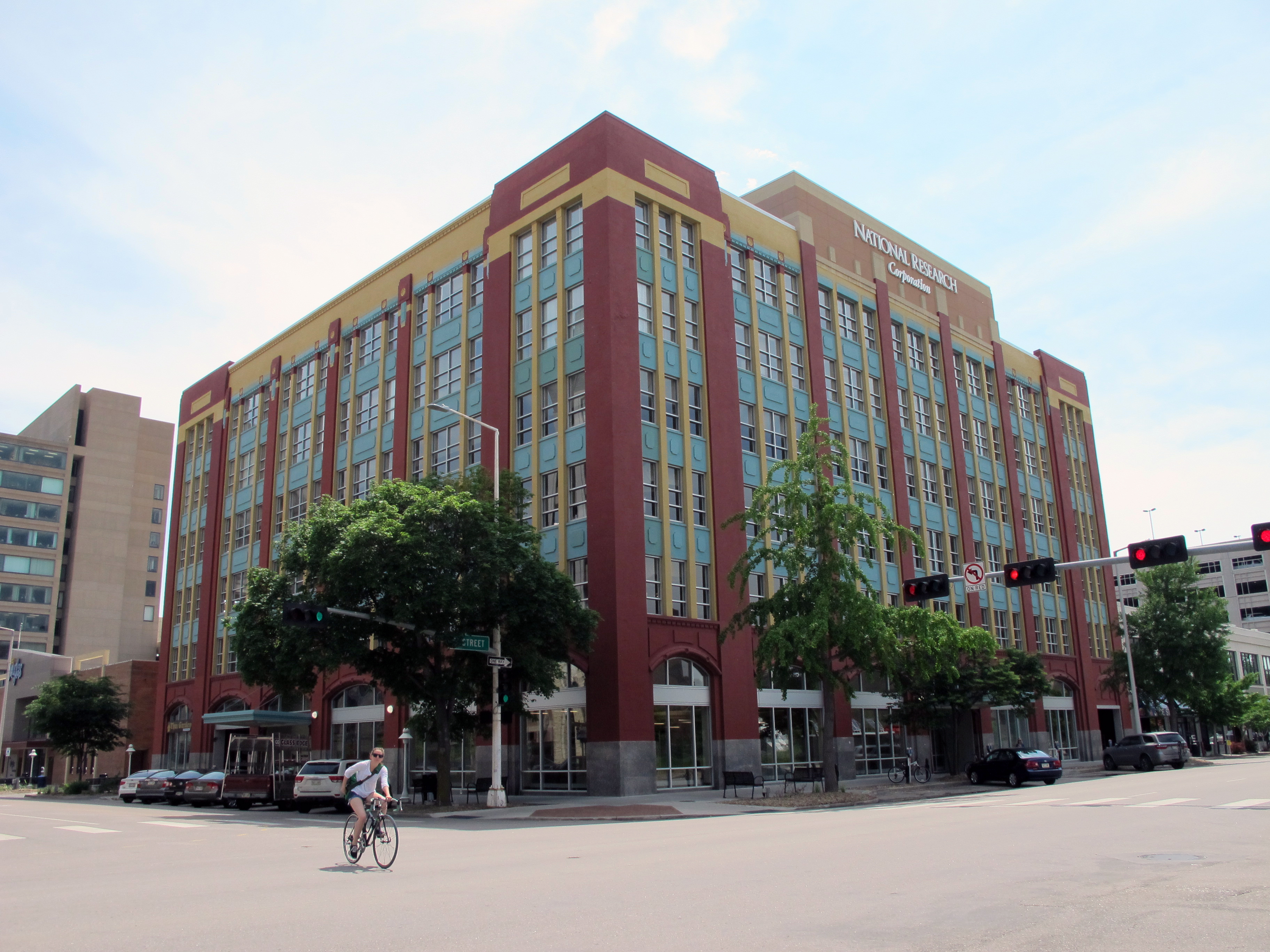
Company headquarters in Lincoln, Nebraska

National Research Corporation, doing business as NRC Health, is an American healthcare company which provides healthcare products and subscription-based solutions in United States and Canada. It was founded in 1981, and is based in Lincoln, Nebraska. The company changed its corporate name from National Research Corporation to NRC Health, Inc. in April 2026.

== History ==
National Research Corporation was established in 1981 to provide performance measurement tools and insights for the healthcare industry.

In 1994, the Picker Institute was founded and began development of the Qualisys technology the following year. In 1998, National Research Corporation acquired Healthcare Research Systems, Inc., expanding its offerings in patient experience measurement.

In 2001, the company purchased the Picker Institute's healthcare survey business, enhancing its market presence in patient-centered research. Expansion continued in 2003 with the acquisition of Smaller World Communications, based in Canada.

The company entered the health risk assessment sector in 2005 through the acquisition of Geriatric Health Systems LLC. In 2006, it acquired TGI Group LLC, which led to the creation of The Governance Institute, a resource for healthcare governance education and research.

In 2009, National Research Corporation acquired My InnerView, a firm recognized for its long-term care quality and satisfaction surveys. This was followed in 2010 by the acquisition of OCS HomeCare, a provider of clinical and outcomes analytics for home health and hospice care.

In 2014, the company acquired Digital Assent, the first software platform to enable healthcare organizations to publish physician star ratings based on patient experience data.

In 2016, National Research Corporation rebranded as NRC Health, reflecting a broader commitment to human-centered care and consumer insights.

On February 11, 2020, NRC Health experienced a cyberattack that resulted in the temporary shutdown of its operations and raised concerns about the security of patient data maintained on behalf of its healthcare clients.

== Awards ==
NRC Health is associated with several healthcare recognition programs, including the Consumer Choice Award, the AHCA/NCAL National Quality Award, and Excellence in Action. These programs acknowledge hospitals and long-term care providers based on performance metrics related to patient and resident satisfaction.

In 2010, the company was approved by the Centers for Medicare and Medicaid Services (CMS) as a vendor for the Home Health Consumer Assessment of Healthcare Providers and Systems (HHCAHPS) survey program.

In 2012 and 2013, Modern Healthcare identified NRC Health as the largest patient satisfaction measurement firm in the United States.

== Products and services ==
Products and solutions provided by NRC Health follows the "Eight Dimensions of Patient-Centered Care" philosophy.

Under this strategy, the company provides:

- Patient & Family Experience
- Resident & Family Experience
- Employee Engagement
- Physician Engagement
- The Consumer Assessment of Healthcare Providers and Systems (CAHPS) program
- Market Insights
- Healthcare Analytics
- Clinical & Outcomes Analytics
- Health Risk Assessments
- Patient Outreach Programs
- Integrated Solutions
- The Institutes

CAHPS is a survey system, including HCAHPS, CGCAHPS, HHCAHPS, NHCAHPS, Pediatric HCAHPS, and ICHCAHPS.
