= Claire Holmquist =

American politician (1906–1972)

Chair of the Executive Board of the Nebraska Legislature
- In office January 7, 1969 – January 5, 1971
- Preceded by: Jerome Warner
- Succeeded by: William F. Swanson

Member of the Nebraska Legislature
- In office January 5, 1965 – April 26, 1972
- Preceded by: Jules Burbach (redistricted)
- Succeeded by: Blair Richendifer
- Constituency: 14th district (1965–1967); 16th district (1967–1972)

Personal details
- Born: October 4, 1906 Oakland, Nebraska
- Died: April 26, 1972 (aged 65) Omaha, Nebraska
- Party: Republican
- Spouse: Mildred Ruth Romberg (m. 1935)
- Children: 3 (Cynthia, Nancy, Jean)
- Education: University of Nebraska
- Occupation: Grain and lumber sales

Claire Holmquist (October 4, 1906 – April 26, 1972) was a Republican politician from Nebraska who served as a member of the Nebraska Legislature from 1965 until his death in 1972.

== Early life ==
Holmquist was born in Oakland, Nebraska, in 1906, and graduated from Oakland High School. He attended the University of Nebraska, graduating in 1928. Holmquist returned to Oakland, where he worked for his family's lumber and grain business. He was elected the president of the Nebraska Lumber Merchants Association in 1956.

In 1958, Holmquist was appointed to the Oakland City Council from the 1st ward by Mayor C. A. Russell, and was confirmed by the council. He was elected to a full term in 1959 and re-elected in 1961. Holmquist was defeated for re-election in 1963, and unsuccessfully ran for mayor in 1964.

== Nebraska Legislature ==
In 1964, following redistricting, Holmquist ran for the legislature from the newly created 14th district, which included Burt and Washington counties. In the nonpartisan primary, he ran against former Lyons Mayor Paul Christensen, former Washington County Attorney B. F. Lundy, and farmer Otto Bromm. Holmquist narrowly placed first in the primary, winning 27 percent of the vote to Christensen's 26 percent, Lundt's 24 percent, and Bromm's 23 percent. He and Christensen proceeded to the general election, which Holmquist won by a thin margin, defeating Christensen with 52 percent of the vote.

Holmquist ran for re-election in 1966 in the 16th district, which consisted of Burt, Thurston, and Washington counties. He was challenged by Francis Hanson, a U.S. Army veteran and former justice of the peace. Holmquist placed first in the primary by a wide margin, winning 68 percent of the vote to Hanson's 32 percent. In the general election, Holmquist won re-election in a landslide, defeating Hanson by the same 68–32 percent margin. At the start of the 1969 legislative session, Holmquist was unanimously elected as the Chair of the Executive Board of the Legislative Council.

In 1970, Holmquist ran for re-election to a third term. He was challenged by Leonard Brummer, a restaurant and lounge owner. In the primary election, Holmquist placed first, winning 58 percent of the vote to Brummer's 42 percent, and they proceeded to the general election. Holmquist ultimately defeated Brummer, winning re-election with 57 percent of the vote.

== Death ==
On April 26, 1972, Holmquist died after undergoing surgery for a throat tumor.
