= Dave Newell =

American politician (1946–2016)

Member of the Nebraska Legislature from the 13th district
- In office January 5, 1977 – January 9, 1985
- Preceded by: George Syas
- Succeeded by: Dan Lynch

Personal details
- Born: October 14, 1946 Oakland, California
- Died: June 26, 2016 (aged 69) Omaha, Nebraska
- Party: Democratic
- Spouse: Arlene Paider (m. 1974)
- Children: 2 (John, Sarah)
- Education: Norfolk Junior College (A.A.); University of Nebraska at Omaha (B.A.)
- Occupation: Lobbyist, real estate investor, activist

David R. Newell (October 14, 1946 – June 26, 2016) was a Democratic politician from Nebraska who served as a member of the Nebraska Legislature from the 13th district from 1977 to 1985.

== Early life ==
Newell was born in Oakland, California, in 1946. He graduated from Bancroft High School, and then attended Norfolk Junior College, graduating with his associate's degree in 1967. Newell later attended the University of Nebraska at Omaha (UNO), receiving his bachelor's degree in education in 1971. He served in the U.S. Army during the Vietnam War, and upon returning, worked as an administrative assistant to the director of the Nebraska Department of Administrative Services and as a union representative for AFSCME. Newell served as the president of the Nebraska Young Democrats and enrolled in graduate-level coursework in history at UNO.

== Nebraska Legislature ==
In 1976, Newell challenged incumbent State Senator George Syas for re-election. Syas, who represented the Omaha-based 13th district, had served since 1950 and was seeking his eleventh term in the legislature. Syas placed first in the primary by a wide margin, winning 65 percent of the vote to Newell's 35 percent. In the general election, however, Newell narrowly defeated Syas, winning 51–49 percent.

Newell ran for re-election in 1980. He was challenged by Syas in a rematch of their 1976 campaign, with Syas attacking Newell for being a "liberal spender" in the legislature. In the primary, Newell placed first, winning 55 percent of the vote to Syas's 45 percent. Newell again defeated Syas by a narrow margin in the general election, winning 51 percent of the vote to Syas's 49 percent. He declined to seek a third term in 1984.

== Post-legislative career ==
On May 26, 1984, Newell announced that he would run for chair of the Nebraska Democratic Party to succeed DiAnna Schimek. Though the race initially included Lancaster County Board Chairman Mike Johanns and Washington County Democratic Party Chairman Tom Nielsen, both ultimately ended their campaigns and Newell was left as the only candidate, winning the election unopposed. Newell stepped down as party chair in 1985 to become a lobbyist for the Distilled Spirits Council.

In 1987, Newell was appointed as the administrator of the Omaha Douglas Public Building Commission, which operated the Omaha City Hall, Douglas County Courthouse, and the building connecting the two. He stepped down in 1995, saying that it was "time to move on." In 1996, Newell shared that he left the commission after a female employee alleged that he had physicall harassed her, an allegation that he denied and that resulted in no formal complaint being filed.

Newell was elected to the Metropolitan Community College Board of Governors from the 2nd district in 2002, and was re-elected in 2006 and 2010. In 2014, he was defeated for re-election by Brad Ashby, an information technology professional.

== Death ==
Newell was diagnosed with ALS in 2015, and died on June 26, 2016.
