= 2024 United States Senate special election in Nebraska =

- November 5, 2024
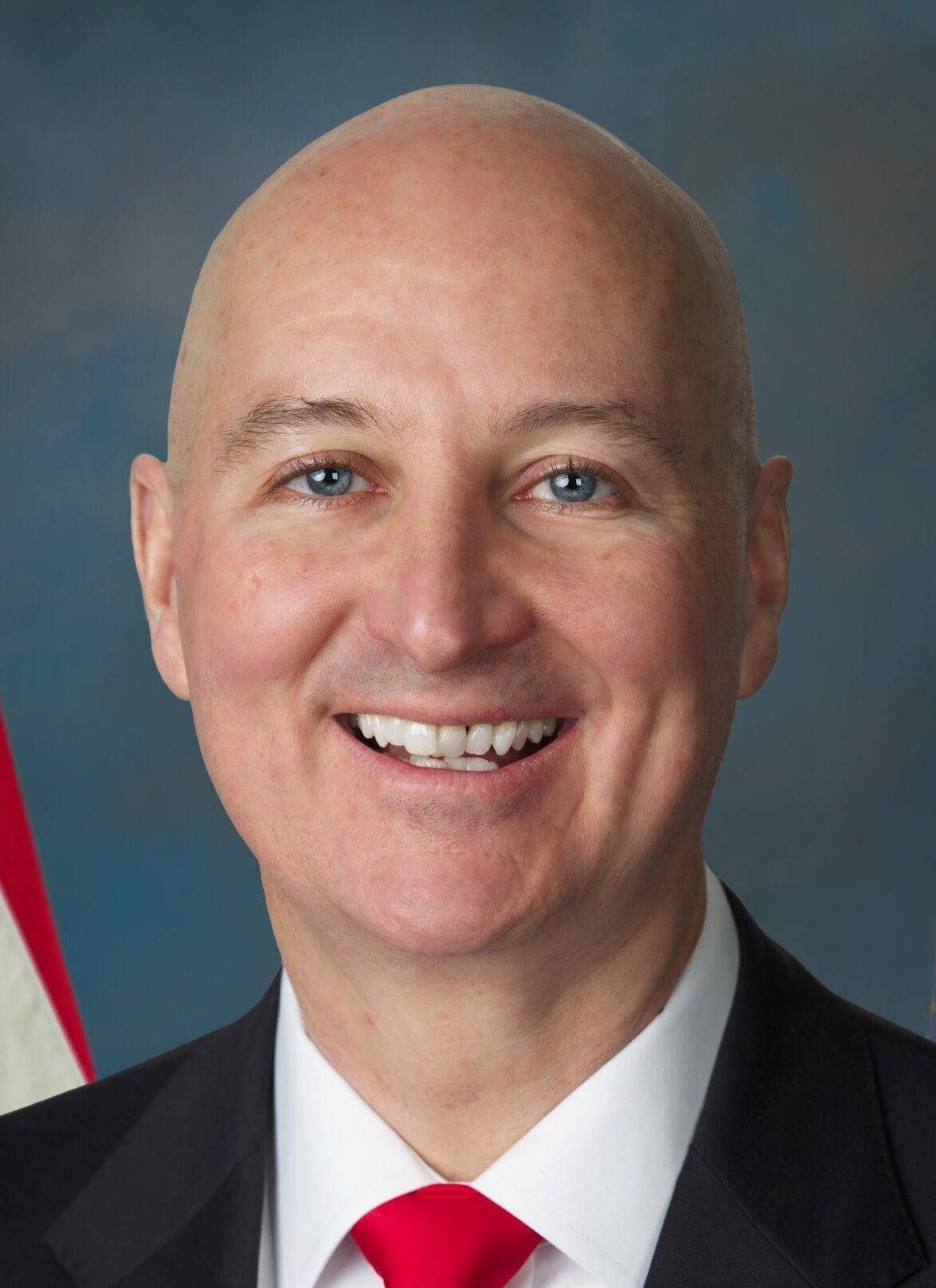

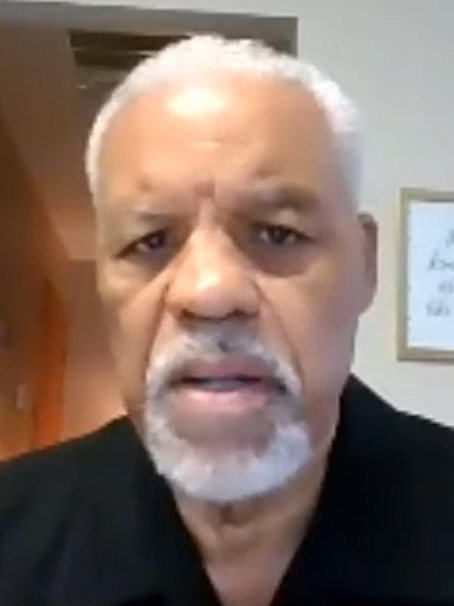
Nominee	Pete Ricketts	Preston Love Jr.
Party	Republican	Democratic
Popular vote	585,103	349,902
Percentage	62.58%	37.42%
- Ricketts: 50–60% 60–70% 70–80% 80–90% 90%+ Love Jr.: 50–60% 60–70% 70–80% 80–90% Tie: 50%
U.S. senator before election
Pete Ricketts (Note: In January 2023, Ricketts was appointed by Governor Jim Pillen to fill the vacancy caused by the resignation of Senator Ben Sasse, who had become the president of University of Florida.)
Republican
Elected U.S. senator
Pete Ricketts
Republican

The 2024 United States Senate special election in Nebraska was held on November 5, 2024, to elect the Class 2 member of the United States Senate from Nebraska. Republican appointee and former Governor Pete Ricketts defeated Democratic nominee Preston Love Jr. with 62.5% of the vote. He would complete the term won in 2020 by Ben Sasse, who resigned in 2023, to become the president of the University of Florida.

This was the first time since 1954 where both of Nebraska's U.S. Senate seats were concurrently up for election. Primary elections took place on May 14, 2024.

Ricketts outperformed other Republicans who faced contested statewide elections in this cycle.

== Appointment ==
Republican Pete Ricketts, former governor of Nebraska (2015–2023) and nominee for the U.S. Senate in 2006, was appointed on January 12, 2023 by Governor Jim Pillen, Ricketts' gubernatorial successor. Ricketts' appointment was met with controversy as Ricketts had financially supported Pillen's 2022 gubernatorial campaign.

=== Applied to be appointed ===
In total, 111 individuals submitted applications for Sasse's seat, and nine candidates were interviewed by Pillen. Applicants included:

- Ann Ashford, attorney, widow of former U.S. Representative Brad Ashford, and candidate for Nebraska's 2nd congressional district in 2020 (Democratic)
- Tom Becka, radio personality (Independent)
- Larry Bolinger, author and perennial candidate (Republican)
- Sid Dinsdale, bank president and candidate for the U.S. Senate in 2014 (Republican)
- Greg Ibach, former Under Secretary of Agriculture for Marketing and Regulatory Programs (2017–2021) and former Nebraska Director of Agriculture (2005–2017) (Republican)
- Brett Lindstrom, state senator from the 18th district (2015–2023), candidate for Nebraska's 2nd congressional district in 2012 and for governor of Nebraska in 2022 (Republican)
- Bryan Slone, president of the Nebraska Chamber of Commerce and Industry and Republican candidate for governor of Nebraska in 2014 (Independent)
- Melanie Standiford, former KNOP-TV news director (Republican)
- John Glen Weaver, U.S. Air Force veteran and candidate for Nebraska's 1st congressional district in 2022 (Republican)

== Republican primary ==
=== Candidates ===
==== Nominee ====
- Pete Ricketts, incumbent U.S. senator (2023–present)

==== Eliminated in primary ====
- Mac Stevens, realtor
- John Glen Weaver, realtor and candidate for Nebraska's 1st congressional district in 2022

=== Endorsements ===
Pete Ricketts

Organizations

- Americans for Prosperity Action
- National Rifle Association Political Victory Fund
- Nebraska Farm Bureau
John Glen Weaver

Political parties

- Nebraska Republican Party

=== Fundraising ===
Campaign finance reports as of April 24, 2024
Candidate	Raised	Spent	Cash on hand
Pete Ricketts (R)	$3,507,567	$2,076,443	$1,431,125
John Glen Weaver (R)	$52,789	$36,280	$16,509
Source: Federal Election Commission

=== Results ===
Results by county: Ricketts: 60–70%; 70–80%; 80–90%; >90%

Republican primary results
Party	Candidate	Votes	%
Republican	Pete Ricketts (incumbent)	173,118	78.16%
Republican	John Glen Weaver	32,529	14.69%
Republican	Mac Stevens	13,669	6.17%
Total votes		219,316	100.00%

== Democratic primary ==
=== Candidates ===
==== Nominee ====
- Preston Love Jr., University of Nebraska Omaha professor, campaign manager for the Jesse Jackson 1984 presidential campaign, and write-in candidate for U.S. Senate in 2020

==== Declined ====
- Paul Theobald, Wayne State College professor and nominee for Nebraska's 3rd congressional district in 2018

=== Endorsements ===
Preston Love Jr.

State legislators

- Tony Vargas, state senator

Party officials

- Precious McKesson, executive director of the Nebraska Democratic Party

Labor unions

- National Education Association

=== Fundraising ===
Campaign finance reports as of April 24, 2024
Candidate	Raised	Spent	Cash on hand
Preston Love Jr. (D)	$127,850	$119,254	$8,595
Source: Federal Election Commission

=== Results ===
Democratic primary results
Party	Candidate	Votes	%
Democratic	Preston Love Jr.	85,114	100.00%
Total votes		85,114	100.00%

== General election ==
=== Predictions ===
Source	Ranking	As of
The Cook Political Report	Solid R	November 9, 2023
Inside Elections	Solid R	November 9, 2023
Sabato's Crystal Ball	Safe R	November 9, 2023
Decision Desk HQ/The Hill	Safe R	June 8, 2024
Elections Daily	Safe R	May 4, 2023
CNalysis	Solid R	November 21, 2023
Split Ticket	Safe R	October 23, 2024
538	Solid R	October 23, 2024

=== Fundraising ===
Campaign finance reports as of June 30, 2024
Candidate	Raised	Spent	Cash on hand
Pete Ricketts (R)	$4,294,715	$2,586,199	$1,708,516
Preston Love Jr. (D)	$164,288 (Note: $58,832 of this total was self-funded by Love Jr.)	$157,747	$6,542
Source: Federal Election Commission

=== Polling ===
Poll source	Date(s) administered	Sample size (Note: Key: A – all adults RV – registered voters LV – likely voters V – unclear)	Margin of error	Pete Ricketts (R)	Preston Love Jr. (D)	Undecided
Economist/YouGov	October 21–28, 2024	1,202 (LV)	± 3.5%	54%	36%	7%
NYT/Siena College	October 23–26, 2024	1,194 (LV)	± 3.2%	56%	38%	6%
NYT/Siena College	October 23–26, 2024	1,194 (RV)	± 3.1%	56%	37%	7%
SurveyUSA (Note: Poll sponsored by the campaign of Dan Osborn, an independent candidate for Nebraska's other Senate seat)	October 9–12, 2024	563 (LV)	± 4.7%	53%	37%	9%
SurveyUSA	September 20–23, 2024	558 (LV)	± 4.8%	53%	35%	12%
SurveyUSA (Note: Poll sponsored by Split Ticket)	August 23–27, 2024	1,293 (RV)	± 3.6%	50%	33%	16%

=== Results ===
2024 United States Senate special election in Nebraska
Party	Candidate	Votes	%	±%
Republican	Pete Ricketts (inc.)	585,103	62.58%	−0.16%
Democratic	Preston Love Jr.	349,902	37.42%	+12.99%
Majority		235,201	25.16%	−13.15%
Total votes		935,005	100.0%	
Republican hold				

==== By county ====
County	Pete Ricketts Republican		Preston Love Jr. Democratic		Total votes
County	%	#	%	#	Total votes
Adams	73.8%	10,438	26.2%	3,715	14,153
Antelope	90.0%	3,066	10.0%	342	3,408
Arthur	93.7%	267	6.3%	18	285
Banner	93.5%	357	6.5%	25	372
Blaine	90.0%	261	10.0%	29	290
Boone	85.9%	2,569	14.1%	423	2,992
Box Butte	79.7%	3,876	20.3%	985	4,861
Boyd	80.4%	849	19.6%	207	1,056
Brown	89.6%	1,467	10.4%	170	1,637
Buffalo	75.4%	17,707	24.6%	5,791	23,498
Burt	75.2%	2,696	24.8%	888	3,584
Butler	83.4%	3,758	16.6%	749	4,507
Cass	70.1%	10,808	29.9%	4,506	15,314
Cedar	87.4%	4,253	12.6%	614	4,867
Chase	91.0%	1,669	9.0%	165	1,834
Cherry	89.7%	2,671	10.3%	306	2,977
Cheyenne	83.4%	3,689	16.6%	733	4,422
Clay	84.5%	2,767	15.5%	506	3,273
Colfax	77.8%	2,713	22.2%	772	3,485
Cuming	84.9%	3,720	15.1%	664	4,384
Custer	89.2%	5,206	10.8%	632	5,838
Dakota	67.2%	5,206	32.8%	1,981	7,187
Dawes	76.8%	2,922	23.2%	884	3,806
Dawson	77.7%	6,579	22.3%	1,887	8,466
Deuel	85.6%	851	14.4%	143	994
Dixon	81.7%	2,314	18.3%	520	2,834
Dodge	69.2%	11,195	30.8%	4,991	16,186
Douglas	47.3%	127,726	52.7%	142,256	269,982
Dundy	91.3%	834	8.7%	79	913
Fillmore	81.4%	2,435	18.6%	557	2,992
Franklin	87.7%	1,395	12.3%	195	1,590
Frontier	88.6%	1,231	11.4%	158	1,389
Furnas	87.2%	2,096	12.8%	308	2,404
Gage	72.1%	7,795	27.9%	3,015	10,810
Garden	88.1%	972	11.9%	131	1,103
Garfield	91.4%	902	8.6%	85	987
Gosper	86.1%	971	13.9%	157	1,128
Grant	96.4%	345	3.6%	13	358
Greeley	86.9%	1,049	13.1%	158	1,207
Hall	72.0%	16,100	28.0%	6,273	22,373
Hamilton	83.2%	4,585	16.8%	927	5,512
Harlan	87.0%	1,558	13.0%	233	1,791
Hayes	95.7%	472	4.3%	21	493
Hitchcock	89.4%	1,271	10.6%	150	1,421
Holt	89.1%	4,818	10.9%	589	5,407
Hooker	88.1%	370	11.9%	50	420
Howard	83.2%	2,925	16.8%	590	3,515
Jefferson	77.4%	2,786	22.6%	813	3,599
Johnson	73.4%	1,556	26.6%	562	2,118
Kearney	82.5%	2,963	17.5%	627	3,590
Keith	84.2%	3,486	15.8%	656	4,142
Keya Paha	93.6%	498	6.4%	34	532
Kimball	85.6%	1,444	14.4%	242	1,686
Knox	84.9%	3,727	15.1%	662	4,389
Lancaster	49.5%	77,189	50.5%	78,598	155,787
Lincoln	79.8%	13,034	20.2%	3,296	16,330
Logan	94.3%	417	5.7%	25	442
Loup	85.0%	364	15.0%	64	432
Madison	80.2%	12,376	19.8%	3,054	15,430
McPherson	96.1%	268	3.9%	11	279
Merrick	84.8%	3,645	15.2%	654	4,299
Morrill	86.0%	2,047	14.0%	332	2,379
Nance	82.8%	1,473	17.2%	306	1,779
Nemaha	74.1%	2,490	25.9%	869	3,359
Nuckolls	85.2%	1,894	14.8%	328	2,222
Otoe	71.0%	5,717	29.0%	2,331	8,048
Pawnee	79.3%	1,078	20.7%	282	1,360
Perkins	88.8%	1,247	11.2%	158	1,405
Phelps	86.7%	4,283	13.3%	657	4,940
Pierce	89.7%	3,471	10.3%	398	3,869
Platte	81.9%	12,709	18.1%	2,818	15,527
Polk	84.0%	2,360	16.0%	448	2,808
Red Willow	74.5%	3,919	25.5%	1,338	5,257
Richardson	77.9%	2,980	22.1%	847	3,827
Rock	92.1%	745	7.9%	64	809
Saline	68.3%	3,809	31.7%	1,765	5,574
Sarpy	58.4%	57,907	41.6%	41,332	99,239
Saunders	75.7%	10,081	24.3%	3,240	4,321
Scotts Bluff	75.8%	11,302	24.2%	3,599	14,901
Seward	76.4%	6,981	23.6%	2,157	9,138
Sheridan	86.9%	2,123	13.1%	319	2,442
Sherman	82.7%	1,367	17.3%	286	1,653
Sioux	91.1%	612	8.9%	60	672
Stanton	85.3%	2,599	14.7%	447	3,046
Thayer	84.1%	2,384	15.9%	452	2,836
Thomas	89.4%	346	10.6%	41	387
Thurston	59.9%	1,234	40.1%	825	2,059
Valley	85.8%	1,935	14.2%	321	2,256
Washington	73.8%	9,145	26.2%	3,239	12,384
Wayne	77.9%	3,160	22.1%	894	4,054
Webster	84.9%	1,477	15.1%	262	1,739
Wheeler	89.5%	419	10.5%	49	468
York	79.1%	5,470	20.9%	1,448	6,918

Counties that flipped from Republican to Democratic

- Douglas (largest city: Omaha)
- Lancaster (largest city: Lincoln)

==== By congressional district ====
Ricketts won all three congressional districts.

District	Ricketts	Love Jr.	Representative
1st	59%	41%	Mike Flood
2nd	50.2%	49.8%	Don Bacon
3rd	79%	21%	Adrian Smith

== See also ==
- 2024 United States Senate election in Nebraska
- 2024 Nebraska elections

== Notes ==
Partisan clients
