= 2020 United States presidential election in Nebraska =

- November 3, 2020
- Turnout: 76.33% (of registered voters) ▲

Nominee	Donald Trump	Joe Biden
Party	Republican	Democratic
Home state	Florida	Delaware
Running mate	Mike Pence	Kamala Harris
Electoral vote	4	1
Popular vote	556,846	374,583
Percentage	58.22%	39.17%

Trump
40–50%
50–60%
60–70%
70–80%
80–90%
90–100%
Biden
40–50%
50–60%
60–70%
70–80%
80–90%
90–100%
No Votes
President before election
Donald Trump
Republican
Elected President
Joe Biden
Democratic

The 2020 United States presidential election in Nebraska was held on Tuesday, November 3, 2020, as part of the 2020 United States presidential election in which all 50 states plus the District of Columbia participated. Nebraska voters chose electors to represent them in the Electoral College via a popular vote, pitting the Republican Party's nominee, incumbent President Donald Trump, and running mate Vice President Mike Pence against Democratic Party nominee, former Vice President Joe Biden, and his running mate California Senator Kamala Harris. Nebraska has five electoral votes in the Electoral College, two from the state at large, and one each from the three congressional districts.

Located in the conservative Great Plains, Nebraska is one of the most reliably Republican states in the country, having backed the Democratic presidential nominee only once since 1936, during Lyndon B. Johnson's 1964 landslide, and having gone to the Republican nominee by a double-digit margin in every presidential election since. However, Nebraska is one of two states, the other being Maine, to allocate its electoral votes by congressional district. A candidate receives one electoral vote for each district won while the statewide winner receives an additional two electoral votes. Ever since Nebraska first adopted this system in 1992, in practice the Republican nominee has almost always won all three districts, and hence all the state's electoral votes. The first time it split its electoral votes came in 2008 when Barack Obama carried Nebraska's 2nd congressional district, anchored by Omaha, and thus received one electoral vote from the state despite losing statewide. The 2nd district returned to the Republican column in the following two elections, but in 2020 it was considered a key battleground.

Trump carried Nebraska statewide by 19 points on Election Day, down from 25 points in 2016. Biden was able to flip the 2nd district, carrying it by 6.6 points, the best Democratic performance since Nebraska first adopted its system of allocation by district, and the first time in this period that the district has voted more Democratic than the nation. Nebraska's 6% margin swing between 2016 and 2020 represented the largest leftward shift towards the Democratic Party out of any state won by Trump that the Democrats otherwise failed to flip, even shifting more leftward than Michigan which was Biden's strongest performance in a state won by Trump in 2016. Trump received the state's other four electoral votes. Before the election, all news organizations declared Nebraska a safe red state, while most organizations viewed the 2nd district as either leaning towards Biden or a tossup. This was the first election in which both Nebraska and Maine split their electoral votes.

== Primary elections ==
The primary elections were held on May 12, 2020.

=== Republican primary ===
Donald Trump was declared the winner in the Republican primary, and thus received all of Nebraska's 36 delegates to the 2020 Republican National Convention.

2020 Nebraska Republican primary
Candidate	Votes	%	Estimated delegates
Donald Trump (incumbent)	243,721	91.4	36
Bill Weld	22,934	8.6	0
Total	266,655	100%	36

=== Democratic primary ===
Joe Biden was declared the winner in the Democratic primary.

2020 Nebraska Democratic presidential primary
Candidate	Votes	%	Delegates
Joe Biden	126,444	76.83	29
Bernie Sanders (withdrawn)	23,214	14.10	
Elizabeth Warren (withdrawn)	10,401	6.32	
Tulsi Gabbard (withdrawn)	4,523	2.75	
Total	164,582	100%	29

=== Libertarian primary ===
2020 Nebraska Libertarian presidential primary
- May 12, 2020
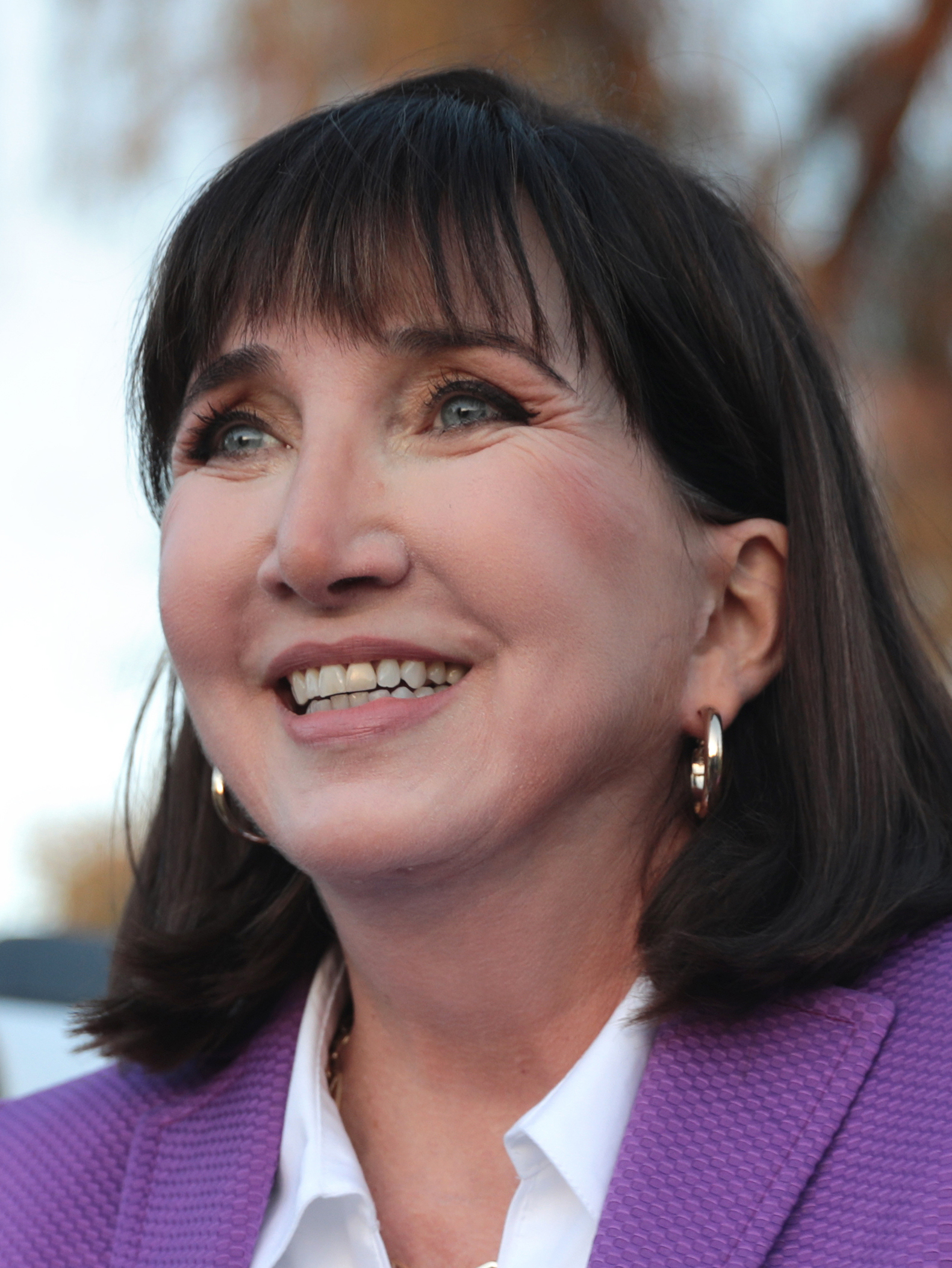

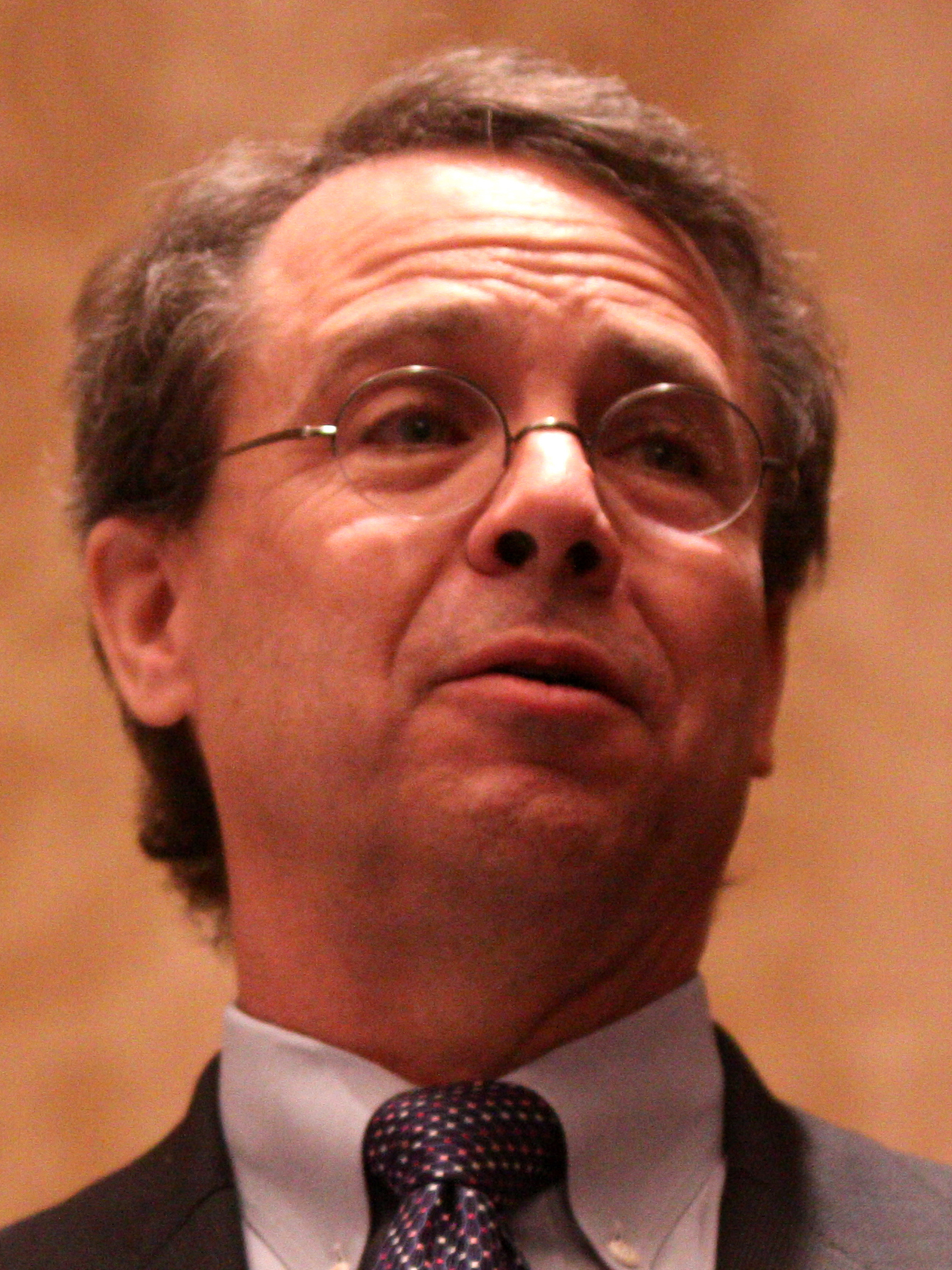

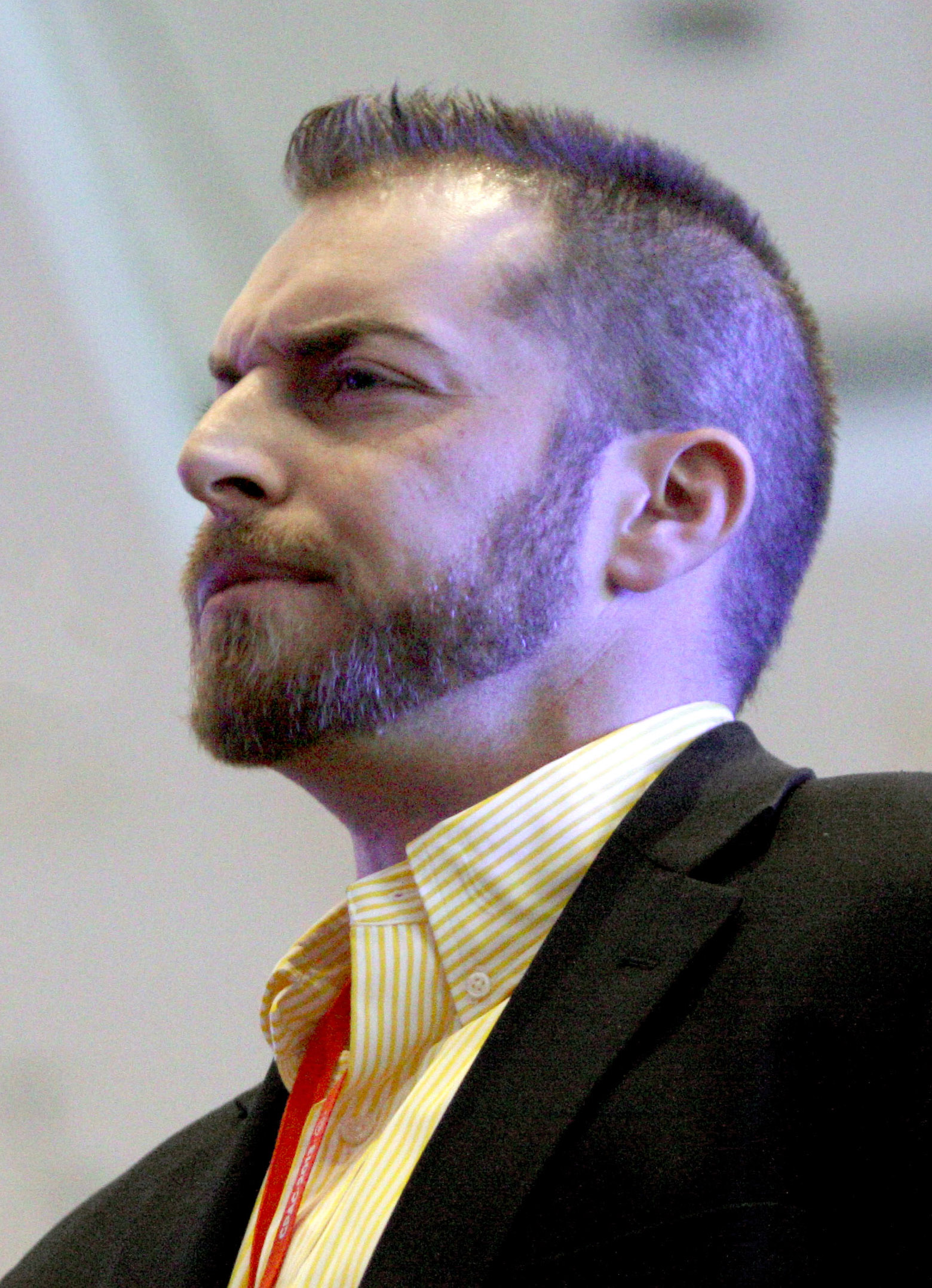

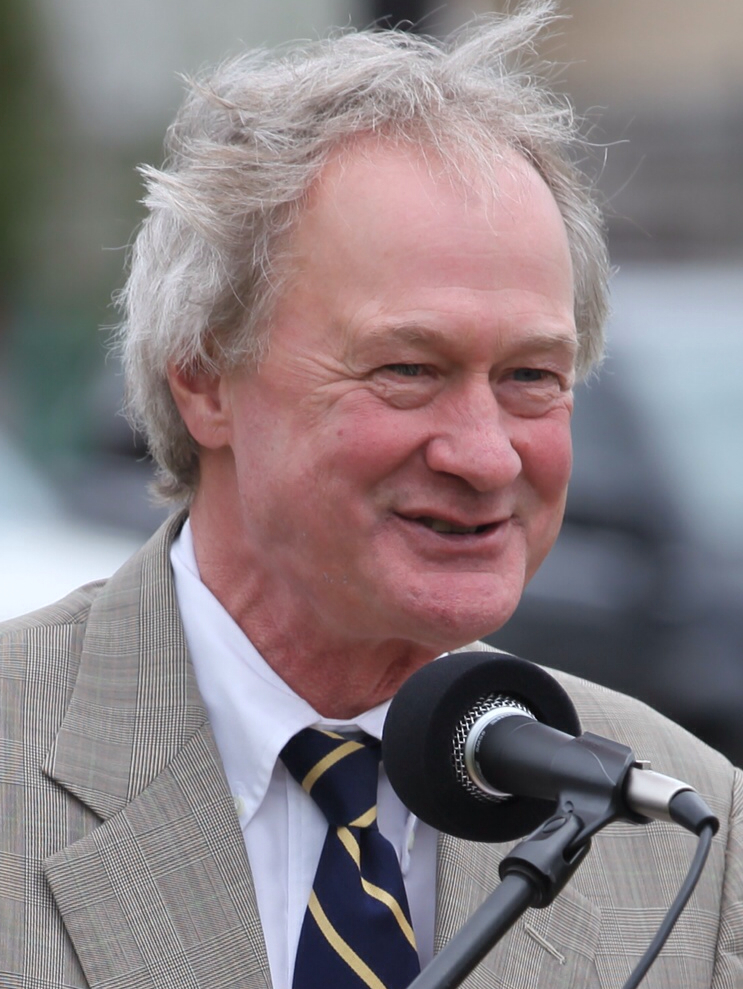

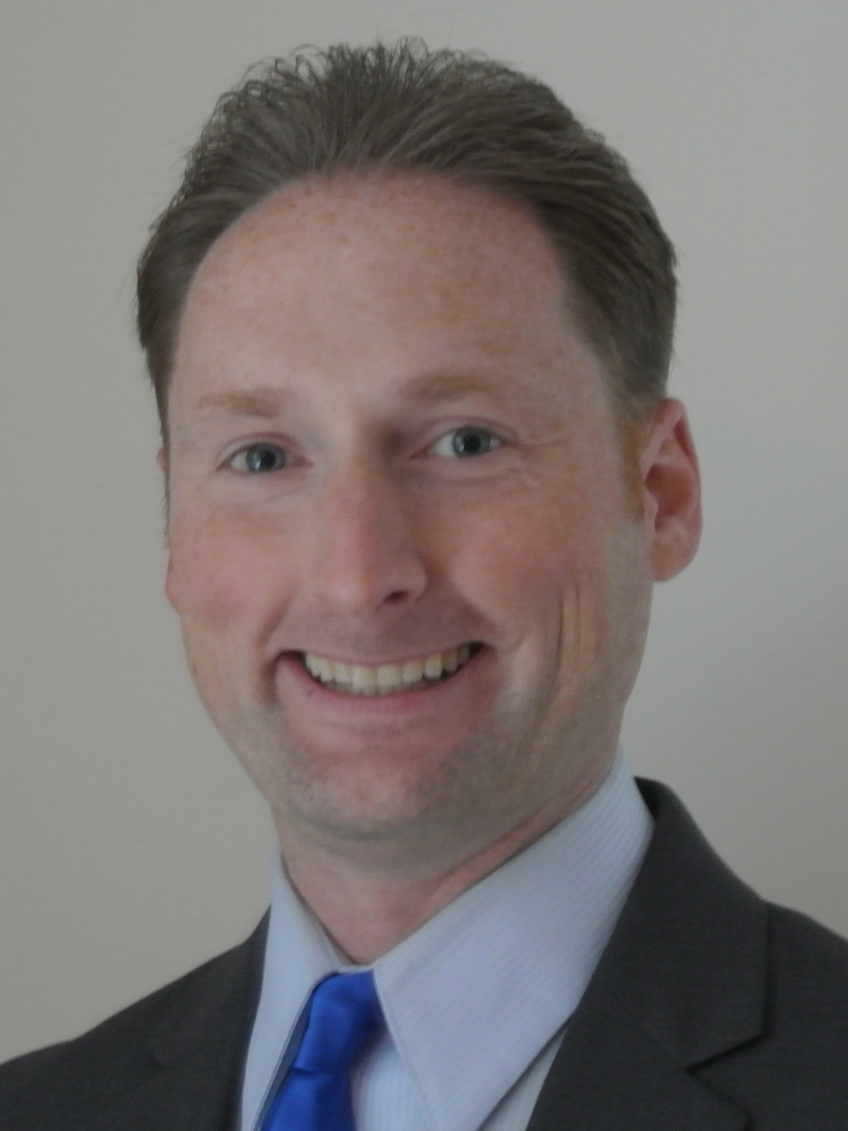

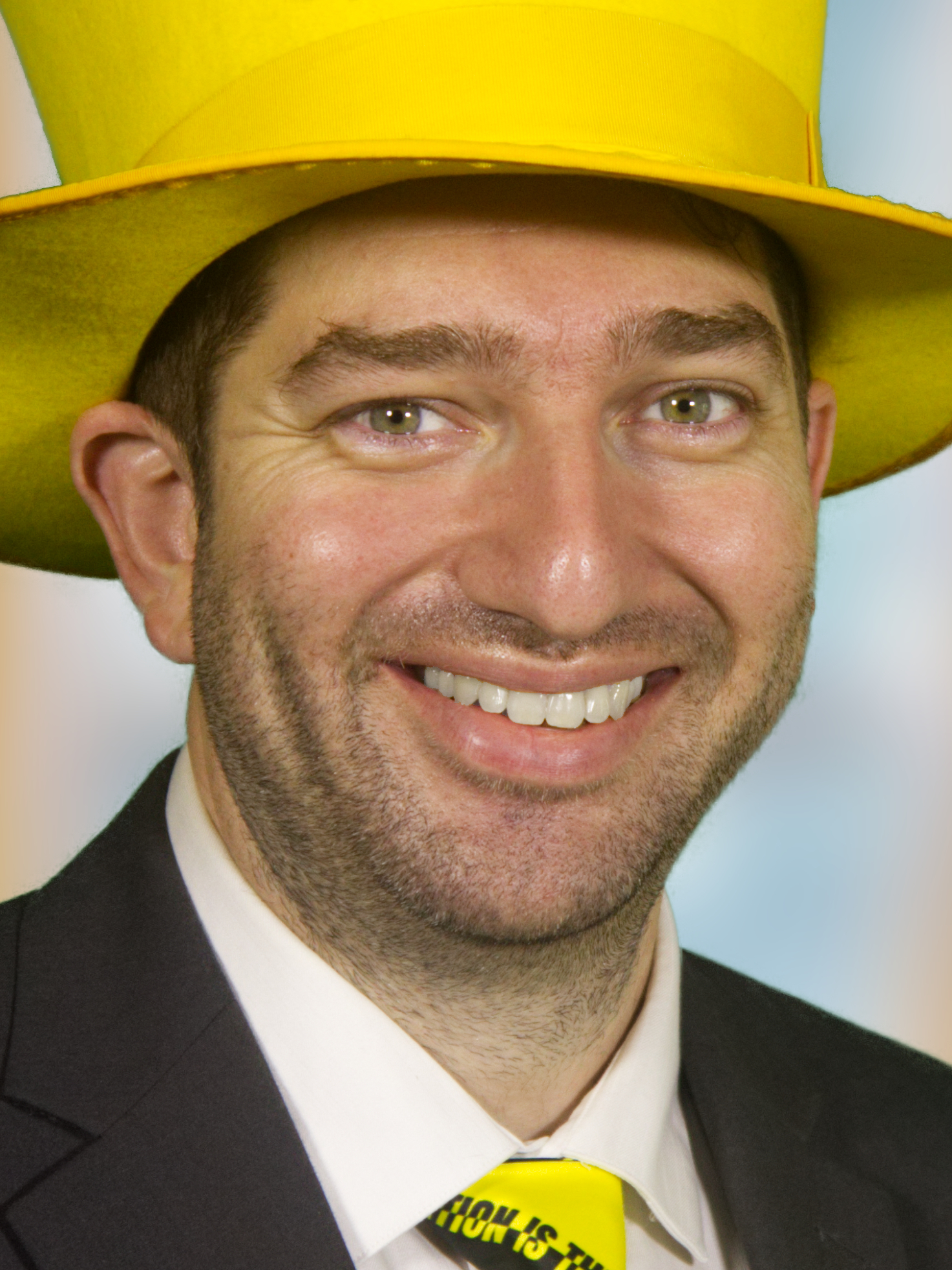
Candidate	Jo Jorgensen	Jacob Hornberger	Adam Kokesh
Home state	South Carolina	Virginia	Indiana
Popular vote	508	444	263
Percentage	27.8%	24.3%	14.4%
Candidate	Lincoln Chafee (withdrawn)	Max Abramson (withdrawn)	Dan Behrman
Home state	Wyoming	New Hampshire	Nevada
Popular vote	254	182	177
Percentage	13.9%	10.0%	9.7%
Election results by county
Jo Jorgensen Jacob Hornberger Adam Kokesh Lincoln Chafee	Max Abramson Dan Behrman Tie No votes

Jo Jorgensen was declared the winner of the Libertarian primary and went on to win the LP nomination.

Nebraska Libertarian presidential primary, May 12, 2020
Candidate	Votes	Percentage
Jo Jorgensen	508	27.8%
Jacob Hornberger	444	24.3%
Adam Kokesh	263	14.4%
Lincoln Chafee (withdrawn)	254	13.9%
Max Abramson (withdrawn)	182	10.0%
Dan Behrman	177	9.7%
Total	1,828	100%

== General election ==
=== Final predictions ===
Source	Statewide	1st district	2nd district	3rd district
The Cook Political Report	Solid R	Solid R	Lean D (flip)	Solid R
Inside Elections	Solid R	Solid R	Tilt D (flip)	Solid R
Sabato's Crystal Ball	Safe R	Safe R	Lean D (flip)	Safe R
Politico	Solid R	Solid R	Lean D (flip)	Solid R
RCP	Solid R	Solid R	Tossup	Solid R
Niskanen	Safe R	Safe R	Tossup	Safe R
CNN	Solid R	Solid R	Lean D (flip)	Solid R
The Economist	Safe R	Not given	Not given	Not given
CBS News	Likely R	Likely R	Lean D (flip)	Likely R
270towin	Safe R	Safe R	Lean D (flip)	Safe R
ABC News	Solid R	Solid R	Lean D (flip)	Solid R
NPR	Likely R	Lean R	Lean D (flip)	Likely R
NBC News	Solid R	Solid R	Lean D (flip)	Solid R
538	Solid R	Solid R	Lean D (flip)	Solid R

=== Polling ===
Statewide

Source of poll aggregation	Dates administered	Dates updated	Joe Biden Democratic	Donald Trump Republican	Other/ Undecided (Note: Calculated by taking the difference of 100% and all other candidates combined.)	Margin
FiveThirtyEight	until November 2, 2020	November 3, 2020	42.5%	52.1%	5.4%	Trump +9.7

View source data.

Poll source	Date(s) administered	Sample size (Note: Key: A – all adults RV – registered voters LV – likely voters V – unclear)	Margin of error	Donald Trump Republican	Joe Biden Democratic	Jo Jorgensen Libertarian	Other	Undecided
SurveyMonkey/Axios	Oct 20 – Nov 2, 2020	1,742 (LV)	± 3.5%	56% (Note: Overlapping sample with the previous SurveyMonkey/Axios poll, but more information available regarding sample size)	43%	−	−	–
SurveyMonkey/Axios	Oct 1–28, 2020	2,423 (LV)	–	53%	46%	−	−	–
SurveyMonkey/Axios	Sep 1–30, 2020	799 (LV)	–	57%	41%	−	−	2%
SurveyMonkey/Axios	Aug 1–31, 2020	560 (LV)	–	53%	47%	−	−	1%
SurveyMonkey/Axios	Jul 1–31, 2020	910 (LV)	–	54%	44%	−	−	2%
SurveyMonkey/Axios	Jun 8–30, 2020	267 (LV)	–	56%	42%	−	−	2%

1st congressional district

Poll source	Date(s) administered	Sample size	Margin of error	Donald Trump Republican	Joe Biden Democratic	Jo Jorgensen Libertarian	Other	Undecided
Strategies 360/Kate Bolz (Note: Poll sponsored by Bolz's campaign)	Jul 16–22, 2020	400 (LV)	± 4.9%	48%	46%	−	−	–

2nd congressional district

View source data.

Poll source	Date(s) administered	Sample size	Margin of error	Donald Trump Republican	Joe Biden Democratic	Jo Jorgensen Libertarian	Other	Undecided
University of Nevada	Oct 30 – Nov 2, 2020	191 (LV)	± 7%	44%	50%	5%	–	–
Change Research	Oct 29 – Nov 2, 2020	920 (LV)	± 3.5%	47%	50%	2%	0% (Note: "Don't recall" and Would not vote with 0%)	0%
Emerson College	Oct 29–30, 2020	806 (LV)	± 3.5%	48% (Note: With voters tho lean towards a given candidate)	50%	–	2% (Note: "Someone else" with 2%)	–
FM3 Research/Congressional Progressive Caucus PAC (Note: The Congressional Progressive Caucus PAC exclusively supports Democratic candidates)	Oct 1–4, 2020	450 (LV)	± 4.6%	42%	53%	−	5% (Note: "Undecided, will vote for another candidate or refused to answer" with 5%)	–
Siena College/NYT	Sep 25–27, 2020	420 (LV)	± 5.3%	41%	48%	4%	1% (Note: would not vote with 1%; "someone else" with 0%)	6% (Note: Includes "Refused")
Global Strategy Group/House Majority PAC (Note: Poll sponsored by the House Majority PAC which exclusively endorses Democratic candidates)	Sep 14–16, 2020	400 (LV)	± 4.9%	44%	50%	−	1% (Note: "Other candidate" with 1%)	3%
Global Strategy Group/House Majority PAC	Jul 27–29, 2020	400 (LV)	–	45%	51%	−	2% (Note: "Other candidate" with 2%)	3%
GQR/Kara Eastman (Note: Poll sponsored by Eastman's campaign)	Jun 30 – Jul 5, 2020	502 (LV)	± 4.37%	44%	51%	−	–	–
DCCC Targeting and Analytics Department/Ally Mutnick (Note: Poll sponsored by the DCCC)	May 7–10, 2020	448 (LV)	± 4.6%	41%	52%	−	–	–

=== Electoral slates ===
These slates of electors were nominated by each party in order to vote in the Electoral College should their candidate win the state:

Donald Trump and Mike Pence Republican Party	Joe Biden and Kamala Harris Democratic Party	Jo Jorgensen and Spike Cohen Libertarian Party
Darlene Starman (At-large); Steve Nelson (At-large); George Olmer (District 1); Mark Quandahl (District 2); Teresa Ibach (District 3)	Roger Wess (At-large); Peg Lippert (At-large); Larry Wright (District 1); Precious McKesson (District 2); Kathy Moore Jensen (District 3)	Ben Backus (At-large); Laura Ebke (At-large); Trevor Reilly (District 1); Margaret Austgen (District 2); Patrick Birkel (District 3)

=== Results ===
As expected, Trump easily carried the state at large. However, because Nebraska (along with Maine) allocates its remaining electoral votes by congressional district, Joe Biden was able to win an electoral vote from Nebraska's second district, which covers the increasingly liberal Omaha metro area. Barack Obama also won the same district in 2008 before it went back to the Republican column in 2012 and 2016.

2020 United States presidential election in Nebraska
Party	Candidate	Votes	%	±%
Republican	Donald Trump Mike Pence	556,846	58.22%	−0.53%
Democratic	Joe Biden Kamala Harris	374,583	39.17%	+5.47%
Libertarian	Jo Jorgensen Spike Cohen	20,283	2.12%	−2.49%
Write-in		4,671	0.49%	−1.41%
Total votes		956,383	100.00%	
Republican win				

==== By county ====
County	Donald Trump Republican		Joe Biden Democratic		Various candidates Other parties		Margin		Total
County	#	%	#	%	#	%	#	%	Total
Adams	10,085	68.83%	4,213	28.75%	355	2.42%	5,872	40.08%	14,653
Antelope	3,093	86.23%	452	12.60%	42	1.17%	2,641	73.63%	3,587
Arthur	260	91.23%	21	7.37%	4	1.40%	239	83.86%	285
Banner	362	88.08%	43	10.46%	6	1.46%	319	77.62%	411
Blaine	280	88.33%	35	11.04%	2	0.63%	245	77.29%	317
Boone	2,653	82.24%	499	15.47%	74	2.29%	2,154	66.77%	3,226
Box Butte	4,002	76.96%	1,051	20.21%	147	2.83%	2,951	56.75%	5,200
Boyd	1,010	87.45%	135	11.69%	10	0.86%	875	75.76%	1,155
Brown	1,470	87.29%	191	11.34%	23	1.37%	1,279	75.95%	1,684
Buffalo	16,640	70.18%	6,350	26.78%	721	3.04%	10,290	43.40%	23,711
Burt	2,580	69.00%	1,063	28.43%	96	2.57%	1,517	40.57%	3,739
Butler	3,542	78.40%	873	19.32%	103	2.28%	2,669	59.08%	4,518
Cass	10,121	66.04%	4,737	30.91%	468	3.05%	5,384	35.13%	15,326
Cedar	4,174	83.23%	725	14.46%	116	2.31%	3,449	68.77%	5,015
Chase	1,740	87.00%	226	11.30%	34	1.70%	1,514	75.70%	2,000
Cherry	2,844	87.00%	373	11.41%	52	1.59%	2,471	75.59%	3,269
Cheyenne	3,813	79.84%	855	17.90%	108	2.26%	2,958	61.94%	4,776
Clay	2,848	79.78%	632	17.70%	90	2.52%	2,216	62.08%	3,570
Colfax	2,636	70.75%	1,025	27.51%	65	1.74%	1,611	43.24%	3,726
Cuming	3,507	78.65%	870	19.51%	82	1.84%	2,637	59.14%	4,459
Custer	5,090	84.69%	786	13.08%	134	2.23%	4,304	71.61%	6,010
Dakota	3,926	57.59%	2,744	40.25%	147	2.16%	1,182	17.34%	6,817
Dawes	2,931	70.61%	1,082	26.07%	138	3.32%	1,849	44.54%	4,151
Dawson	6,524	70.98%	2,497	27.17%	170	1.85%	4,027	43.81%	9,191
Deuel	871	84.24%	141	13.64%	22	2.12%	730	70.60%	1,034
Dixon	2,335	75.47%	651	21.04%	108	3.49%	1,684	54.43%	3,094
Dodge	10,984	64.85%	5,544	32.73%	410	2.42%	5,440	32.12%	16,938
Douglas	119,159	43.09%	150,350	54.37%	7,031	2.54%	-31,191	-11.28%	276,540
Dundy	883	88.04%	105	10.47%	15	1.49%	778	77.57%	1,003
Fillmore	2,359	74.94%	693	22.01%	96	3.05%	1,666	52.93%	3,148
Franklin	1,437	83.16%	276	15.97%	15	0.87%	1,161	67.19%	1,728
Frontier	1,229	84.99%	189	13.07%	28	1.94%	1,040	71.92%	1,446
Furnas	2,163	83.13%	399	15.33%	40	1.54%	1,764	67.80%	2,602
Gage	7,445	66.96%	3,385	30.44%	289	2.60%	4,060	36.52%	11,119
Garden	1,016	84.67%	161	13.42%	23	1.91%	855	71.25%	1,200
Garfield	933	86.71%	133	12.36%	10	0.93%	800	74.35%	1,076
Gosper	893	79.66%	215	19.18%	13	1.16%	678	60.48%	1,121
Grant	375	93.28%	20	4.98%	7	1.74%	355	88.30%	402
Greeley	1,016	80.70%	229	18.19%	14	1.11%	787	62.51%	1,259
Hall	16,189	66.21%	7,681	31.42%	580	2.37%	8,508	34.79%	24,450
Hamilton	4,309	77.42%	1,118	20.09%	139	2.49%	3,191	57.33%	5,566
Harlan	1,615	83.51%	282	14.58%	37	1.91%	1,333	68.93%	1,934
Hayes	494	92.16%	34	6.34%	8	1.50%	460	85.82%	536
Hitchcock	1,264	85.99%	185	11.90%	31	2.11%	1,089	74.09%	1,470
Holt	4,769	85.93%	686	12.36%	95	1.71%	4,083	73.57%	5,550
Hooker	376	85.07%	59	13.35%	7	1.58%	317	71.72%	442
Howard	2,786	79.35%	648	18.46%	77	2.19%	2,138	60.89%	3,511
Jefferson	2,616	70.13%	1,016	27.24%	98	2.63%	1,600	42.89%	3,730
Johnson	1,518	67.98%	647	28.97%	68	3.05%	871	39.01%	2,233
Kearney	2,822	78.02%	701	19.38%	94	2.60%	2,121	58.64%	3,617
Keith	3,544	81.12%	763	17.46%	62	1.42%	2,781	63.66%	4,369
Keya Paha	476	89.81%	49	9.25%	5	0.94%	427	80.56%	530
Kimball	1,563	83.27%	268	14.28%	46	2.45%	1,295	68.99%	1,877
Knox	3,721	79.04%	905	19.22%	82	1.74%	2,816	59.82%	4,708
Lancaster	70,092	44.58%	82,293	52.34%	4,830	3.08%	-12,201	-7.76%	157,215
Lincoln	13,071	76.16%	3,692	21.51%	400	2.33%	9,379	54.65%	17,163
Logan	407	90.44%	38	8.44%	5	1.12%	369	82.00%	450
Loup	370	81.50%	75	16.52%	9	1.98%	295	64.98%	454
Madison	11,940	75.48%	3,478	21.99%	401	2.53%	8,462	53.49%	15,819
McPherson	275	91.06%	17	5.63%	10	3.31%	258	85.43%	302
Merrick	3,419	79.85%	743	17.35%	120	2.80%	2,676	62.50%	4,282
Morrill	2,113	82.60%	386	15.09%	59	2.31%	1,727	67.51%	2,558
Nance	1,437	78.44%	359	19.60%	36	1.96%	1,078	58.84%	1,832
Nemaha	2,428	70.75%	921	26.84%	83	2.41%	1,507	43.91%	3,432
Nuckolls	1,857	80.56%	409	17.74%	39	1.70%	1,448	62.82%	2,305
Otoe	5,649	67.61%	2,490	29.80%	216	2.59%	3,159	37.81%	8,355
Pawnee	1,071	74.95%	322	22.53%	36	2.52%	749	52.42%	1,429
Perkins	1,321	85.50%	199	12.88%	25	1.62%	1,122	72.62%	1,545
Phelps	4,157	82.79%	752	14.98%	112	2.23%	3,405	67.81%	5,021
Pierce	3,462	86.29%	480	11.96%	70	1.75%	2,982	74.33%	4,012
Platte	12,186	77.51%	3,260	20.74%	275	1.75%	8,926	56.77%	15,721
Polk	2,291	79.36%	530	18.36%	66	2.28%	1,761	61.00%	2,887
Red Willow	4,525	82.72%	811	14.83%	134	2.45%	3,714	67.89%	5,470
Richardson	3,073	74.33%	996	24.09%	65	1.58%	2,077	50.24%	4,134
Rock	744	88.36%	84	9.98%	14	1.66%	660	78.38%	842
Saline	3,631	62.82%	1,986	34.36%	163	2.82%	1,645	28.46%	5,780
Sarpy	51,979	54.04%	41,206	42.84%	3,008	3.12%	10,773	11.20%	96,193
Saunders	9,108	71.23%	3,331	26.05%	347	2.72%	5,777	45.18%	12,786
Scotts Bluff	10,952	70.55%	4,196	27.03%	376	2.42%	6,756	43.52%	15,524
Seward	6,490	70.55%	2,438	26.50%	271	2.95%	4,052	44.05%	9,199
Sheridan	2,292	85.39%	340	12.67%	52	1.94%	1,952	72.72%	2,684
Sherman	1,322	77.76%	343	20.18%	35	2.06%	979	57.58%	1,700
Sioux	642	87.82%	72	9.85%	17	2.33%	570	77.97%	731
Stanton	2,561	80.92%	532	16.81%	72	2.27%	2,029	64.11%	3,165
Thayer	2,308	77.22%	624	20.88%	57	1.90%	1,684	56.34%	2,989
Thomas	377	88.29%	45	10.54%	5	1.17%	332	77.75%	427
Thurston	1,180	49.60%	1,122	47.16%	77	3.24%	58	2.44%	2,379
Valley	1,901	81.10%	412	17.58%	31	1.32%	1,489	63.52%	2,344
Washington	8,583	68.85%	3,554	28.51%	330	2.64%	5,029	40.34%	12,467
Wayne	3,055	72.43%	1,022	24.23%	141	3.34%	2,033	48.20%	4,218
Webster	1,511	80.54%	335	17.86%	30	1.60%	1,176	62.68%	1,876
Wheeler	438	87.08%	59	11.73%	6	1.19%	379	75.35%	503
York	5,337	74.53%	1,630	22.76%	194	2.71%	3,707	51.77%	7,161
Totals	556,846	58.22%	374,583	39.17%	24,954	2.61%	182,263	19.05%	956,383

==== By congressional district ====
Trump won two of Nebraska's three congressional districts, while Biden won the second, which elected a Republican.

District	Trump		Biden		Other		Representative
District	#	%	#	%	#	%	Representative
1st	180,290	56.01%	132,261	41.09%	9,335	2.90%	Jeff Fortenberry
2nd	154,377	45.45%	176,468	51.95%	8,821	2.60%	Don Bacon
3rd	222,179	75.36%	65,854	22.34%	6,798	2.31%	Adrian Smith

== Analysis ==
Biden won only the two most populous counties in the state: Douglas County, home to Omaha, by 11 points, approximately the same margin Lyndon B. Johnson won the county within 1964 and the best result for Democrats since that election, and Lancaster County, home to the state's second-largest city and state capital Lincoln, where the University of Nebraska is located, by just under 8 points, another 56-year high for Democrats. While he didn't win the state's third largest, Sarpy County, a growing suburban county to the south of Omaha, which in all presidential elections from 1968 to 2016 except 2008 had backed the Republican candidate by at least 21 points, he reduced Trump's winning margin to only 11 points and won 43 percent of the vote there, again a 56-year best for Democrats. Biden also received more than 40 percent of the vote in two counties in the northeastern corner of the state: Thurston County, of which Trump only won by a plurality of 49.6% and is home to a Native American majority, and Dakota County, located to the north of the former and is home to a large Hispanic population.

Per exit polls by the Associated Press, Trump's strength in Nebraska came from whites, who constituted 90% of the electorate, and specifically from Protestants with 70%. Post-election, many rural Nebraskans expressed worries about trade and the economy under a Biden presidency, with 59% of voters stating they trusted Trump more to handle international trade. Joe Biden improved on Hillary Clinton's performance in Nebraska, as he did in most other states. Despite his loss, Biden's 374,583 votes are the most received by a Democratic candidate for president statewide in Nebraska, surpassing the previous record set by Franklin D. Roosevelt in the 1932 landslide.

== Notes ==
Partisan clients

== See also ==
- United States presidential elections in Nebraska
- Presidency of Joe Biden
- 2020 United States presidential election
- 2020 Democratic Party presidential primaries
- 2020 Republican Party presidential primaries
- 2020 United States elections
