= Preston Love Jr. =

American politician and activist

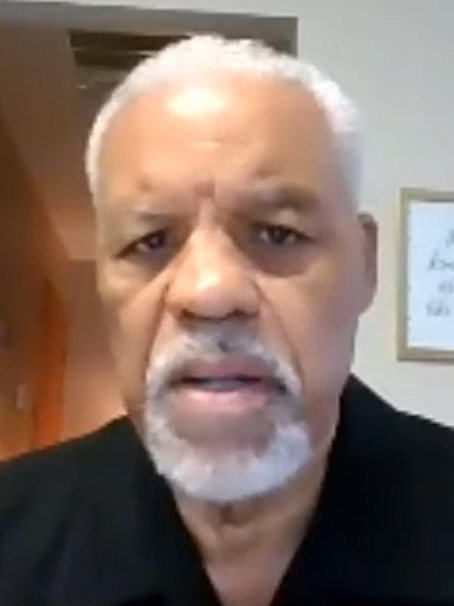
- Love in 2020

Personal details
- Born: 1942 (age 83–84) Omaha, Nebraska, U.S.
- Party: Democratic
- Spouse: Martha
- Parent: Preston Love (father)
- Relatives: Laura Love (half-sister)
- Education: University of Nebraska–Lincoln (BS); Bellevue University (MPS)
- Website: Official website

Preston Love Jr. (born 1942) is an American politician, professor, author and activist who served as Jesse Jackson's campaign manager during the 1984 Democratic primaries.

Love is the first black person in Nebraska to receive the support of a major political party for United States Senate. He was endorsed by the Nebraska Democratic Party for the 2020 United States Senate election in Nebraska to challenge incumbent Senator Ben Sasse. He was the Democratic candidate in the 2024 United States Senate special election in Nebraska, where he lost to incumbent senator Pete Ricketts in the general election.

== Early life and education ==
Preston Love Jr. was born in the early 1940s to Betty and Preston Love. He graduated from Omaha Technical High School, where he was a member of the football team, in 1960. The musician Laura Love is his younger half-sister.

Love graduated from the University of Nebraska–Lincoln with a Bachelor of Science degree in economics and Bellevue University with a Master of Professional Studies degree. He played for Nebraska Cornhuskers football and was drafted into the Detroit Lions. Love played one season with the 1965 Lincoln Comets of the Pro Football League of America. Love worked as a junior executive in IBM and established the first retail computer store in Atlanta, Georgia.

Love was inducted into the Nebraska High School Sports Hall of Fame.

== Career ==
Love is the founder and CEO of a nonprofit organization in Omaha called the Institute for Urban Development. In 2021, Love launched an effort to promote the history of African Americans in Omaha focused on facilitating tours in North Omaha.

Love worked as an adjunct professor at the University of Nebraska Omaha. He is a columnist for the Omaha World-Herald and a contributor to the Fine Lines Journal.

=== Politics ===
Love served as vice-president of the NAACP chapter in Omaha, Nebraska. He worked for Harold Washington during Chicago's 1983 mayoral election. During the 1984 Democratic primaries Love was selected by Jesse Jackson to serve as Jackson's presidential campaign manager. Love worked as Andrew Young's chauffeur before his election as mayor and Young appointed Love as commissioner of planning for Atlanta.

In 1990, Love formed an organization to recommend the addition of the contributions of black Nebraskans to the Nebraska Blue Book. In 1992, Love ran for a seat on the Metropolitan Utilities District board, but later withdrew to recover from his addictions. Love later became second associate chair in the Nebraska Democratic Party. Love supported freeing Edward Poindexter, who he knew as a child, from his life-sentence.

Chris Janicek won the Democratic senatorial nomination for the 2020 United States Senate election in Nebraska. However, during the campaign, he sent out sexually inappropriate text messages to staffers, causing the Nebraska Democratic Party to withdraw its support from him. The Nebraska Democratic Party attempted to replace Janicek with Alisha Shelton, but Janicek refused to drop out preventing the replacement. Love later announced his intention to run a write-in senatorial campaign and received the support of the Nebraska Democratic Party, making him the first black person to receive the support of a major party for United States Senate in Nebraska.

Love was the Democratic candidate in the 2024 United States Senate special election in Nebraska. He ran unopposed in the primary and faced incumbent senator Pete Ricketts in the general election. He lost the race to Ricketts by over 25 percentage points.

== Electoral history ==
2020 United States Senate election in Nebraska
Party	Candidate	Votes	%
Republican	Ben Sasse (incumbent)	583,507	62.74
Democratic	Chris Janicek	227,191	24.43
Democratic	Preston Love Jr. (write-in)	58,411	6.28
Libertarian	Gene Siadek	55,115	5.93
Write-in		5,788	0.62
Total votes		930,012	100.00
Republican hold			

2024 United States Senate special election in Nebraska
Primary election
Party	Candidate	Votes	%
Democratic	Preston Love Jr.	85,114	100.00
Total votes		85,114	100.00
General election
Republican	Pete Ricketts (incumbent)	585,103	62.58
Democratic	Preston Love Jr.	349,902	37.42
Total votes		935,005	100.00
Republican hold			

== Awards and recognition ==
Love has been recognized for numerous accomplishments in Nebraska. His awards include:

- (2023) Inductee, Nebraska High School Sports Hall of Fame.
- (2022) Inductee, Northeast Community College Alumni Hall of Fame
- (2022) Namesake, Nebraska Democratic Party Annual Preston Love Jr. Volunteer Award
- (2021) Frank LaMere Hall of Fame Award, Nebraska Democratic Party

== Bibliography ==
- Wisdom's Foresight: From Cataracts to Pandemic Vaccines (2021) ISBN 978-1734587968
- Your Bridge to History with Portia Love, illustrations by Regina Jeanpierre (2019) ISBN 978-0996446495
- A Clear Vision: From Cataracts to Pandemic Vaccines (2020) ISBN 978-1734587944
- The Jackson Papers: Post 1965 Voting Rights Act, Pre-Obama Era: The Jesse Jackson Run for President (2018) ISBN 978-0996446488
- Economic Cataracts Volume 1. (2015) ISBN 978-0996446419

== See also ==
- List of African-American United States Senate candidates

Party political offices
Preceded by David Domina	Democratic nominee for U.S. Senator from Nebraska (Class 2); 2020 (endorsed), 2024; Served alongside: Chris Janicek (2020, disavowed)	Succeeded by Cindy Burbank; Withdrew
