= Tony Fulton (Nebraska politician) =

American politician

25th Tax Commissioner of Nebraska
- In office January 4, 2016 – December 30, 2022
- Governor: Pete Ricketts
- Preceded by: Leonard J. Sloup (Acting); Kim Conroy
- Succeeded by: Glen White (Acting)

Member of the Nebraska Legislature from the 29th district
- In office 2007–2013
- Preceded by: Mike Foley
- Succeeded by: Kate Bolz

Personal details
- Born: September 29, 1972 (age 54) Auburn, Nebraska, U.S.
- Party: Republican
- Education: University of Nebraska–Lincoln (BS)

Tony Fulton (born September 29, 1972) is a politician and businessman who served as the tax commissioner of Nebraska under Governor Pete Ricketts from 2016 to 2022. He previously represented a Lincoln district in the Nebraska Legislature from 2007 to 2013.

== Early life and education ==
Born in Auburn, Nebraska, Fulton graduated from Auburn Senior High School in 1990. He attended the University of Nebraska–Lincoln (UNL), where he studied engineering. Before completing his degree, he took two years off to study philosophy through Kansas Newman University and Mount St. Mary's University. He eventually received a Bachelor of Science degree in mechanical engineering from UNL in 1997.

== Career ==
In 2003, Fulton founded Guardian Angels Homecare in Lincoln; the business provides in-home services to elderly people.

In January 2007, Fulton was appointed by governor Dave Heineman to represent the 29th district, consisting of part of southern Lincoln, in the Nebraska Legislature. He replaced incumbent Mike Foley, who had been elected state auditor. He won election to the seat for a full term in 2008. In 2012, Fulton was forced to retire from the legislature due to term limits, amid a dispute between the secretary of state and the attorney general as to whether Fulton's tenure after being appointed to the seat meant he had served the two term limit.

He ran for State Treasurer in 2010, placing second in the Republican primary behind former state attorney general Don Stenberg.

In 2016, he was appointed to the position of state tax commissioner by governor Pete Ricketts.
