= 2020 United States Senate election in Nebraska =

- November 3, 2020
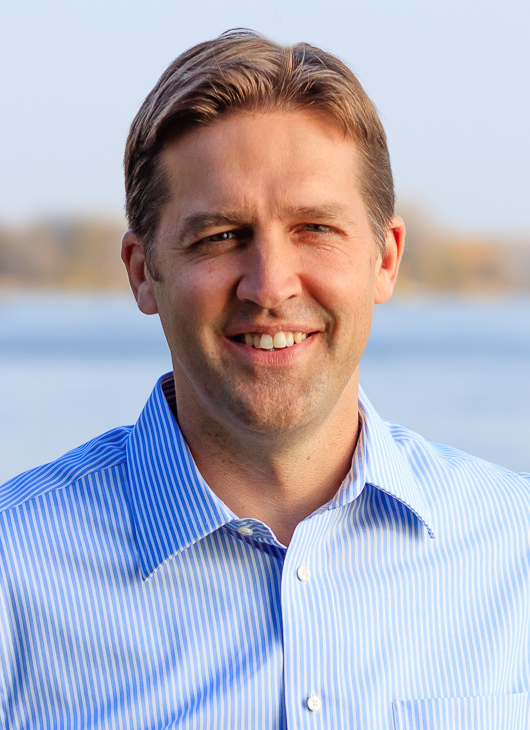

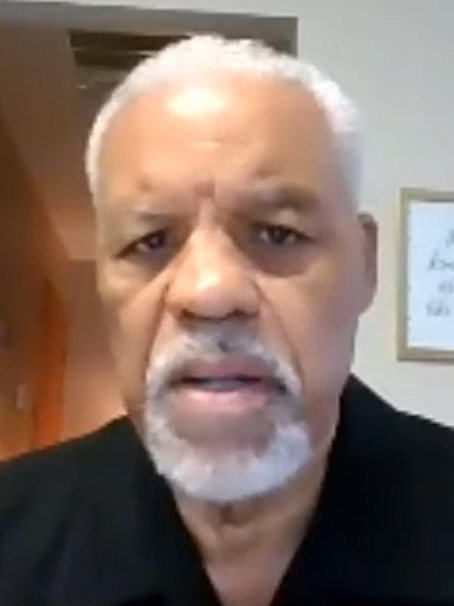

Nominee	Ben Sasse	Chris Janicek
Party	Republican	Democratic
Popular vote	583,507	227,191
Percentage	62.74%	24.43%
Nominee	Preston Love Jr. (write-in)	Gene Siadek
Party	Democratic	Libertarian
Popular vote	58,411	55,115
Percentage	6.28%	5.93%
- Sasse: 40–50% 50–60% 60–70% 70–80% 80–90% >90% Janicek: 40–50% 50–60% 60–70% 70–80% 80–90% >90% No votes
U.S. senator before election
Ben Sasse
Republican
Elected U.S. Senator
Ben Sasse
Republican

The 2020 United States Senate election in Nebraska was held on November 3, 2020, to elect a member of the United States Senate to represent the State of Nebraska, concurrently with the 2020 U.S. presidential election, as well as other elections to the United States Senate, elections to the United States House of Representatives and various state and local elections.

Incumbent Republican Senator Ben Sasse was challenged by Democratic nominee Chris Janicek, who was disavowed by his party after numerous scandals; by write-in candidate Preston Love Jr., who received the support of the state Democratic Party; and by Libertarian nominee Gene Siadek.

Sasse won election to a second term with 62.7% of the vote and a 38.3% margin. He outperformed President Donald Trump by almost 27,000 votes, or 8.9%, compared to the concurrent presidential election, the largest overperformance by any Republican US Senate candidate in the country that year. Trump won the state by 19.05%. In contrast, Janicek was the worst performing Democratic Senate candidate in the country compared to Joe Biden, underperforming him by 13.1%. This was attributed to a sexual misconduct scandal affecting Janicek and split-ticket voting in Omaha suburbs.

== Republican primary ==
=== Candidates ===
==== Nominee ====
- Ben Sasse, incumbent U.S. senator

==== Eliminated in primary ====
- Matt Innis, businessman and former chair of the Lancaster County Republican Party

==== Declined ====
- Charles Herbster, farmer
- Pete Ricketts, Governor of Nebraska

=== Endorsements ===
Ben Sasse

Organizations

- Club for Growth

=== Polling ===
Poll source	Date(s) administered	Sample size (Note: Key: A – all adults RV – registered voters LV – likely voters V – unclear)	Margin of error	Matt Innis	Ben Sasse	Undecided
We Ask America	February 19–20, 2020	400 (LV)	± 4.9%	17%	65%	18%

=== Results ===
Republican primary results by county Sasse: 50–60%; 60–70%; 70–80%; 80–90%; Innis: 50–60%; 60–70%

Republican primary results
Party	Candidate	Votes	%
Republican	Ben Sasse (inc.)	215,207	75.21%
Republican	Matt Innis	70,921	24.79%
Total votes		284,212	100.00%

== Democratic primary ==
=== Candidates ===
==== Nominee ====
- Chris Janicek, businessman and candidate for U.S. Senate in 2018

On June 16, 2020, Janicek lost the support of the Nebraska Democratic Party after allegations surfaced of sending sexually explicit text messages about a female campaign staff member and allegedly using racist slurs to insult a guest at a party 20 years prior. Nonetheless, Janicek refused to drop out of the race and his name remained on the ballot in the general election. In September the state Democratic party supported Preston Love Jr. via a write-in candidacy.

==== Eliminated in primary ====
- Dennis Frank Maček
- Larry Marvin, perennial candidate
- Angie Philips, mental health advocate
- Alisha Shelton, behavioral health clinical supervisor
- Andy Stock, former candidate for Lancaster County Treasurer
- Dan Wik, physician

==== Declined ====
- Chris Beutler, former mayor of Lincoln

=== Results ===
Democratic primary results by county Janicek: 30–40%; 40–50%; 50–60%; 60–70%; Philips: 20–30%; 30–40%; 40–50%; Shelton: 20–30%; 30–40%; Tie: 20–30%

Democratic primary results
Party	Candidate	Votes	%
Democratic	Chris Janicek	46,247	30.69%
Democratic	Angie Philips	35,929	23.84%
Democratic	Alisha Shelton	34,284	22.75%
Democratic	Andy Stock	17,156	11.38%
Democratic	Larry Marvin	6,868	4.56%
Democratic	Daniel Wik	5,765	3.83%
Democratic	Dennis Macek	4,453	2.95%
Total votes		150,702	100.00%

== Other candidates ==
=== Libertarian Party ===
==== Nominee ====
- Gene Siadek, former chairman of the Libertarian Party of Nebraska

==== Withdrawn ====
- Eric Dilliard

==== Results ====
Libertarian primary results
Party	Candidate	Votes	%
Libertarian	Gene Siadek	2,517	100.00%
Total votes		2,517	100.00%

=== Democratic write-in ===
==== Declared ====
- Preston Love Jr., first vice president of the Omaha NAACP chapter and second associate chairman of the Nebraska Democratic Party, endorsed by the party after the allegations against Janicek

==== Withdrawn ====
- Brad Ashford, former Democratic Congressman from NE-02

== General election ==
Write-ins for Love Jr. by county: 10-11% 6-7% 4–5% 3–4% 2–3% 1–2% <1%

=== Predictions ===
Source	Ranking	As of
The Cook Political Report	Safe R	October 29, 2020
Inside Elections	Safe R	October 28, 2020
Sabato's Crystal Ball	Safe R	November 2, 2020
Daily Kos	Safe R	October 30, 2020
Politico	Safe R	November 2, 2020
RCP	Safe R	October 23, 2020
DDHQ	Safe R	November 3, 2020
538	Safe R	November 2, 2020
Economist	Safe R	November 2, 2020

=== Polling ===
Poll source	Date(s) administered	Sample size	Margin of error	Ben Sasse (R)	Chris Janicek (D)	Gene Siadek (L)	Undecided
Cygnal	October 19–21, 2020	625 (LV)	± 3.9%	47%	18%	6%	29%

Hypothetical polling

Poll source	Date(s) administered	Sample size	Margin of error	Generic Republican	Generic Democrat	Undecided
Cygnal	October 19–21, 2020	625 (LV)	± 3.9%	53%	38%	9%

=== Results ===
United States Senate election in Nebraska, 2020
Party	Candidate	Votes	%	±%
Republican	Ben Sasse (inc.)	583,507	62.74%	−1.60%
Democratic	Chris Janicek	227,191	24.43%	−7.06%
Democratic	Preston Love Jr. (write-in)	58,411	6.28%	—
Libertarian	Gene Siadek	55,115	5.93%	—
Write-in		5,788	0.62%	+0.54%
Majority		356,316	38.31%	+5.46%
Total votes		930,012	100.0%	
Republican hold				

==== By county ====
County	Ben Sasse Republican		Chris Janicek Democratic		Preston Love Jr. (write-in) Democratic		Gene Siadek Libertarian		Write-in		Total votes
County	%	#	%	#	%	#	%	#	%	#	Total votes
Adams	70.88%	9,995	18.32%	2,583	3.89%	548	6.36%	897	0.56%	79	14,102
Antelope	82.14%	2,828	10.28%	354	0.84%	29	5.34%	184	1.39%	48	3,443
Arthur	84.44%	228	7.78%	21	0.00%	0	7.78%	21	0.00%	0	270
Banner	84.17%	335	9.80%	39	0.50%	2	5.28%	21	0.25%	1	398
Blaine	75.00%	222	11.82%	35	0.68%	2	11.49%	34	1.01%	3	296
Boone	79.51%	2,402	11.62%	351	1.79%	54	5.89%	178	1.19%	36	3,021
Box Butte	75.59%	3,840	16.18%	822	1.34%	68	6.42%	326	0.47%	24	5,080
Boyd	83.62%	883	8.43%	89	0.00%	0	7.10%	75	0.85%	9	1,056
Brown	85.20%	1,387	7.68%	125	0.86%	14	5.71%	93	0.55%	9	1,628
Buffalo	72.45%	16,729	16.68%	3,851	3.38%	780	6.95%	1,605	0.55%	126	23,091
Burt	73.57%	2,639	18.90%	678	1.95%	70	5.21%	187	0.36%	13	3,587
Butler	80.16%	3,512	13.99%	613	1.05%	46	4.52%	198	0.27%	12	4,381
Cass	70.77%	10,493	19.38%	2,874	3.55%	527	5.98%	886	0.31%	46	14,826
Cedar	81.34%	3,902	11.36%	545	0.96%	46	5.67%	272	0.67%	32	4,797
Chase	85.70%	1,666	8.90%	173	0.62%	12	4.06%	79	0.72%	14	1,944
Cherry	78.49%	2,365	9.39%	283	1.16%	35	9.09%	274	1.86%	56	3,013
Cheyenne	75.54%	3,505	15.47%	718	0.45%	21	6.96%	323	1.57%	73	4,640
Clay	77.73%	2,660	12.62%	432	1.55%	53	7.10%	243	0.99%	34	3,422
Colfax	73.24%	2,652	20.63%	747	1.66%	60	4.31%	156	0.17%	6	3,621
Cuming	82.07%	3,566	11.71%	509	1.57%	68	4.56%	198	0.09%	4	4,345
Custer	82.56%	4,824	9.09%	531	0.74%	43	6.18%	361	1.44%	84	5,843
Dakota	60.53%	3,951	34.24%	2,235	1.33%	87	3.68%	240	0.21%	14	6,527
Dawes	71.75%	2,883	19.54%	785	2.17%	87	6.22%	250	0.32%	13	4,018
Dawson	72.31%	6,460	20.48%	1,830	1.42%	127	5.36%	479	0.43%	38	8,934
Deuel	82.71%	837	10.28%	104	0.49%	5	6.13%	62	0.40%	4	1,012
Dixon	74.05%	2,206	16.82%	501	1.58%	47	6.92%	206	0.64%	19	2,979
Dodge	69.07%	11,397	20.65%	3,408	3.47%	572	6.51%	1,074	0.30%	50	16,501
Douglas	50.71%	136,745	32.49%	87,608	10.10%	27,229	5.94%	16,019	0.76%	2,046	269,647
Dundy	85.82%	835	7.91%	77	0.82%	8	4.93%	48	0.51%	5	973
Fillmore	78.46%	2,418	14.11%	435	2.21%	68	5.06%	156	0.16%	5	3,082
Franklin	82.67%	1,398	11.24%	190	1.24%	21	4.20%	71	0.65%	11	1,691
Frontier	84.14%	1,183	9.17%	129	0.92%	13	5.19%	73	0.57%	8	1,406
Furnas	81.43%	2,079	10.85%	277	0.71%	18	6.31%	161	0.71%	18	2,553
Gage	70.44%	7,656	20.61%	2,240	2.83%	308	5.70%	620	0.41%	45	10,869
Garden	82.06%	938	11.11%	127	0.09%	1	6.47%	74	0.26%	3	1,143
Garfield	84.52%	868	8.86%	91	0.78%	8	4.87%	50	0.97%	10	1,027
Gosper	82.42%	900	10.16%	111	1.56%	17	5.40%	59	0.46%	5	1,092
Grant	86.29%	321	3.76%	14	1.08%	4	6.72%	25	2.15%	8	372
Greeley	79.97%	938	14.15%	166	0.85%	10	4.77%	56	0.26%	3	1,173
Hall	68.54%	16,231	21.87%	5,180	2.76%	653	6.29%	1,489	0.54%	129	23,682
Hamilton	77.24%	4,114	12.73%	678	2.23%	119	7.02%	374	0.77%	41	5,326
Harlan	81.37%	1,529	11.07%	208	1.22%	23	5.59%	105	0.75%	14	1,879
Hayes	88.91%	457	5.84%	30	0.39%	2	4.47%	23	0.39%	2	514
Hitchcock	81.65%	1,179	9.97%	144	0.69%	10	7.55%	109	0.14%	2	1,444
Holt	77.98%	4,165	11.29%	603	1.14%	61	6.98%	373	2.60%	139	5,341
Hooker	81.73%	349	11.24%	48	0.94%	4	3.98%	17	2.11%	9	427
Howard	78.86%	2,660	13.22%	446	1.54%	52	6.14%	207	0.24%	8	3,373
Jefferson	75.17%	2,764	18.06%	664	1.25%	46	5.19%	191	0.33%	12	3,677
Johnson	72.93%	1,576	19.30%	417	1.90%	41	5.78%	125	0.09%	2	2,161
Kearney	79.56%	2,790	11.75%	412	2.02%	71	6.27%	220	0.40%	14	3,507
Keith	78.92%	3,355	13.01%	553	1.62%	69	5.98%	254	0.47%	20	4,251
Keya Paha	84.39%	427	8.10%	41	0.20%	1	6.72%	34	0.59%	3	506
Kimball	79.85%	1,458	13.36%	244	0.49%	9	6.13%	112	0.16%	3	1,826
Knox	75.78%	3,376	15.89%	708	0.65%	29	6.46%	288	1.21%	54	4,455
Lancaster	51.74%	79,436	31.75%	48,756	10.41%	15,990	5.47%	8,405	0.62%	954	153,541
Lincoln	75.39%	12,679	15.61%	2,626	1.81%	304	6.62%	1,113	0.57%	96	16,818
Logan	85.22%	369	8.31%	36	0.23%	1	5.08%	22	1.15%	5	433
Loup	84.28%	370	6.38%	28	4.10%	18	4.78%	21	0.46%	2	439
Madison	75.31%	11,552	15.64%	2,399	2.20%	337	6.15%	943	0.71%	109	15,340
McPherson	88.14%	260	4.07%	12	0.68%	2	6.44%	19	0.68%	2	295
Merrick	79.81%	3,242	12.58%	511	1.03%	42	6.57%	267	0.00%	0	4,062
Morrill	76.14%	1,870	13.23%	325	0.53%	13	9.00%	221	1.10%	27	2,456
Nance	78.57%	1,353	14.05%	242	1.63%	28	5.23%	90	0.52%	9	1,722
Nemaha	75.11%	2,511	15.67%	524	2.54%	85	6.16%	206	0.51%	17	3,343
Nuckolls	82.27%	1,856	11.30%	255	1.20%	27	4.74%	107	0.49%	11	2,256
Otoe	73.18%	5,961	18.43%	1,501	2.49%	203	5.59%	455	0.32%	26	8,146
Pawnee	77.46%	1,072	15.68%	217	2.02%	28	4.70%	65	0.14%	2	1,384
Perkins	85.18%	1,270	9.26%	138	0.74%	11	4.63%	69	0.20%	3	1,491
Phelps	80.46%	3,896	10.08%	488	1.18%	57	6.69%	324	1.59%	77	4,842
Pierce	83.85%	3,261	9.08%	353	1.05%	41	5.25%	204	0.77%	30	3,889
Platte	79.26%	12,055	14.35%	2,183	1.40%	213	4.77%	725	0.22%	34	15,210
Polk	80.97%	2,276	12.63%	355	1.39%	39	4.66%	131	0.36%	10	2,811
Red Willow	80.65%	4,290	10.79%	574	1.69%	90	6.39%	340	0.47%	25	5,319
Richardson	76.05%	3,023	17.11%	680	1.06%	42	4.93%	196	0.86%	34	3,975
Rock	86.94%	699	5.35%	43	0.00%	0	5.97%	48	1.74%	14	804
Saline	65.91%	3,675	25.29%	1,410	1.99%	111	6.81%	380	0.00%	0	5,576
Sarpy	61.46%	57,763	25.00%	23,500	6.88%	6,471	6.20%	5,826	0.46%	432	93,992
Saunders	74.06%	9,210	16.06%	1,997	3.22%	400	6.18%	768	0.49%	61	12,436
Scotts Bluff	71.36%	10,820	20.06%	3,042	1.82%	276	6.29%	953	0.47%	71	15,162
Seward	75.04%	6,718	16.35%	1,464	3.21%	287	5.08%	455	0.32%	29	8,953
Sheridan	78.87%	2,042	11.20%	290	0.50%	13	8.07%	209	1.35%	35	2,589
Sherman	75.60%	1,233	15.14%	247	0.98%	16	7.85%	128	0.43%	7	1,631
Sioux	84.92%	597	7.40%	52	0.71%	5	6.69%	47	0.28%	2	703
Stanton	76.80%	2,304	12.47%	374	1.63%	49	8.07%	242	1.03%	31	3,000
Thayer	81.38%	2,356	12.85%	372	1.38%	40	4.25%	123	0.14%	4	2,895
Thomas	82.25%	329	10.00%	40	0.00%	0	5.25%	21	2.50%	10	400
Thurston	53.30%	1,218	38.73%	885	2.36%	54	3.24%	74	2.36%	54	2,285
Valley	80.47%	1,821	12.37%	280	1.33%	30	5.39%	122	0.44%	10	2,263
Washington	72.88%	8,808	16.39%	1,981	4.10%	495	6.30%	761	0.34%	41	12,086
Wayne	73.62%	3,000	15.66%	638	3.26%	133	6.77%	276	0.69%	28	4,075
Webster	80.43%	1,443	12.82%	230	1.78%	32	4.96%	89	0.00%	0	1,794
Wheeler	80.79%	387	10.23%	49	0.63%	3	7.52%	36	0.84%	4	479
York	77.84%	5,406	14.64%	1,017	1.83%	127	5.46%	379	0.23%	16	6,945
