= Laura Love =

American musician and singer-songwriter

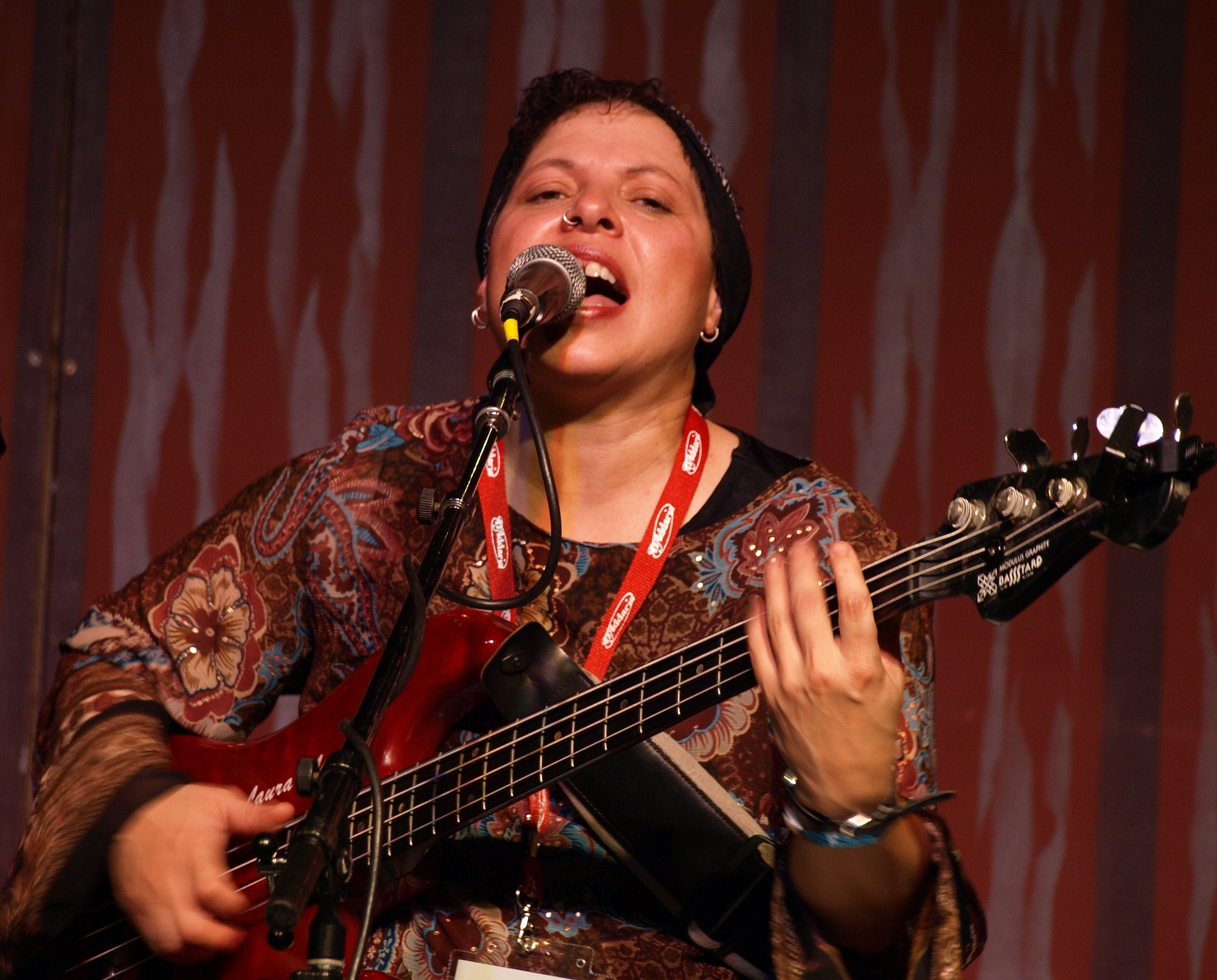

Background information
- Born: Laura Jones; 1960 (age 65–66); Lincoln, Nebraska, U.S.
- Genres: Folk, Afro-Celtic
- Occupation: Singer-songwriter
- Instrument: Bass guitar
- Years active: 1976–present

Laura Love (born 1960) is an American singer-songwriter and bass guitar player. Her style has been described as "Afro-Celtic" and has also been influenced by bluegrass.

== Personal life ==
Love was born Laura Jones in Lincoln, Nebraska, in 1960. She is of African American, Native American, and white descent. Love had a difficult childhood, raised by a mother with schizophrenia and in foster homes. Her father, who had little involvement in her life, was the jazz musician Preston Love who played the saxophone with Count Basie, Lucky Millinder and Johnny Otis and formed his own band in the 1950s. Love's mother, Wini, had been a singer in Preston's jazz band.

Preston Love Jr., her older half-brother, is a Nebraska politician.

== Career ==
Love began her performing career at age 16, singing for the prisoners at the Nebraska State Penitentiary. Love relocated to Seattle, Washington, where she was a member of the 1980s rock group Boom Boom G.I. She was also a member of an all-female band, Venus Envy.

After Love released three albums on her own label, Octoroon Biography, Putumayo released a collection of her songs in 1995. Her 2003 album Welcome to Pagan Place included the controversial song "I Want You Gone", about George W. Bush. In 2004, she published an autobiography titled You Ain't Got No Easter Clothes, with an accompanying album of the same name.

== Discography ==
- Z Therapy (1990)
- Pangaea (1992)
- Helvetica Bold (1994)
- The Laura Love Collection (1995)
- Jo Miller and Laura Love Sing Bluegrass and Old Time Music (1995)
- Octoroon (1997)
- Shum Ticky (1998)
- Fourteen Days (2000)
- Welcome to Pagan Place (2003)
- You Ain't Got No Easter Clothes (2004)
- NēGrass (2007)
- The Sweeter the Juice (2009)
- She Loved Red (2018)
- Uppity (2021)

== Published works ==
- Love, Laura (2004). You Ain't Got No Easter Clothes. New York (Hyperion Books). ISBN 1-4013-0011-1
