= Kate Bolz =

American politician

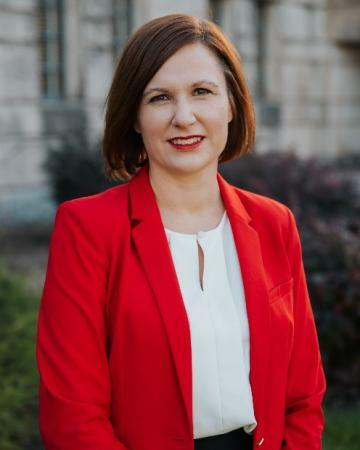

Member of the Nebraska Legislature from the 29th district
- In office January 9, 2013 – January 6, 2021
- Preceded by: Tony Fulton
- Succeeded by: Eliot Bostar

Personal details
- Born: March 1, 1979 (age 47) Lincoln, Nebraska, U.S.
- Party: Democratic
- Education: Nebraska Wesleyan University (BA); University of Michigan (MSW)
- Website: Campaign website

Kate Bolz (born March 1, 1979) is an American politician and social worker who served as a member of the Nebraska Legislature, representing the 29th district from 2013 to 2021. She was the Democratic nominee for Nebraska's 1st congressional district in the 2020 election.

== Early life and education ==
Born in Lincoln, Nebraska, Bolz graduated from Palmyra High School in 1997. She earned a Bachelor of Arts degree from Nebraska Wesleyan University in 2001 and Master of Social Work from the University of Michigan in 2005.

== Career ==
Bolz was an Emerson National Hunger Fellow, and also worked with the Lutheran Services of America. She later became a policy analyst with Nebraska Appleseed, focusing on a low-income self-sufficiency program.

Bolz was elected to the Nebraska Legislature in 2012. During her tenure in the legislature, Bolz has specialized in education issues, tax fairness, opportunities for working families, aging issues, and economic growth.

In October 2019, Bolz announced that she would run against Jeff Fortenberry to represent Nebraska's 1st congressional district in the United States House of Representatives in the 2020 elections. On May 12, 2020, Bolz defeated Babs Ramsey and became the Democratic nominee. She lost the November election, and soon joined the staff of Lincoln, Nebraska Mayor Leirion Gaylor Baird. She was later named State Director for Rural Development for the USDA.

Nebraska Legislature
Preceded by Tony Fulton	Member of the Nebraska Legislature from the 29th district 2013–present	Incumbent
