= Precious McKesson =

American political activist

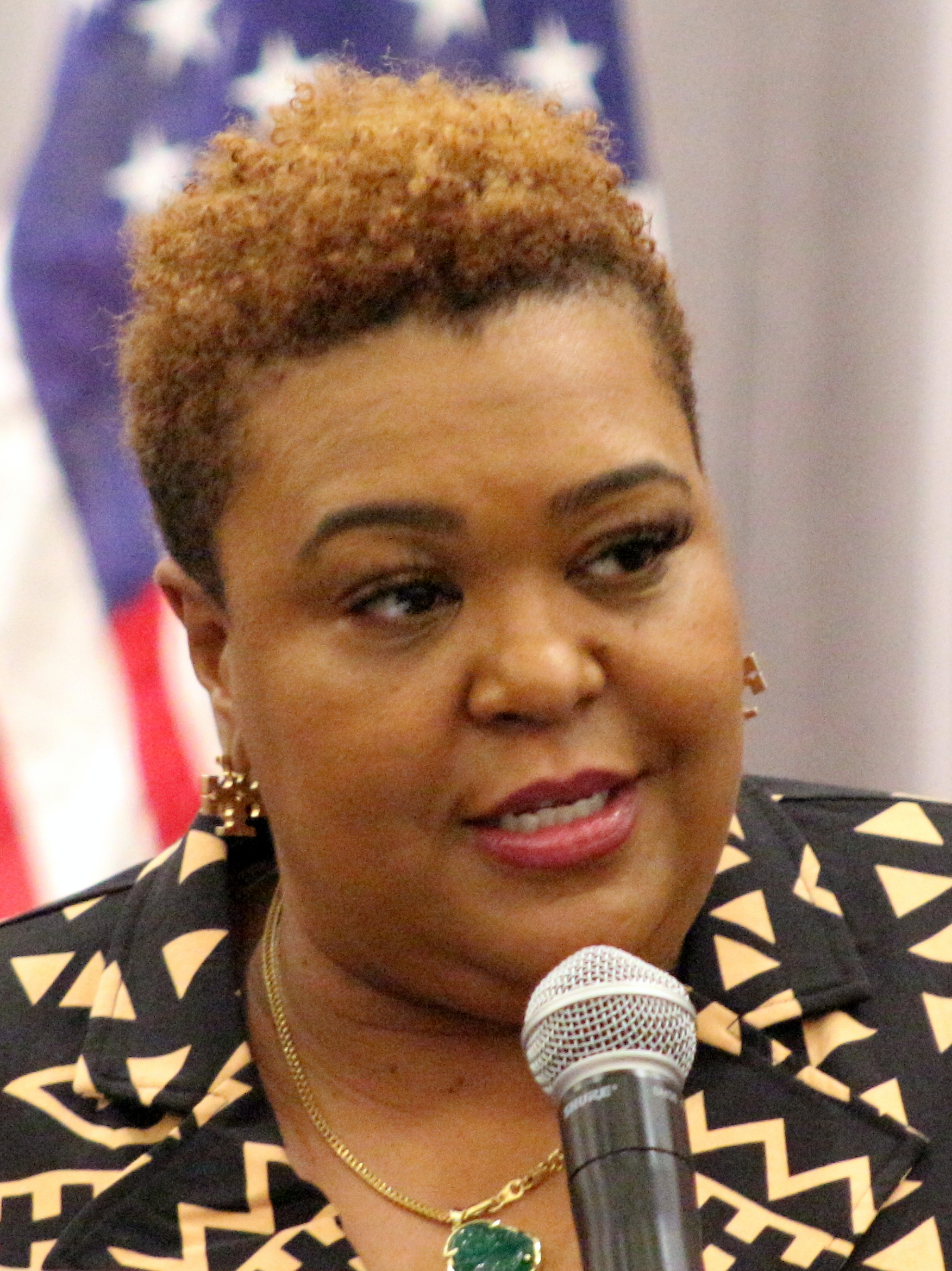
- McKesson in 2025

Executive Director of the Nebraska Democratic Party
- Incumbent
- Assumed office March 28, 2022

Personal details
- Born: Fort Bragg, North Carolina, U.S.
- Known for: Political activism, Political Strategist, CD2 Elector

Precious McKesson is an American political official and political activist. As of March 2022 she is the Executive Director of the Nebraska Democratic Party. She was formerly the Biden Administration's appointee to the Office of Communications and Outreach in the U.S. Department of Education. She is the former Finance Director for the Nebraska Democratic Party and former political director for the 2020 presidential campaign of Joe Biden in the 2nd District of Nebraska during the 2020 United States presidential election. She is the first woman of color in Nebraska to cast an Electoral College ballot, and the first woman in Nebraska to cast an Electoral College ballot for a Democrat.

== Career ==
McKesson began her political career with work as a volunteer for the 1997 campaign of Brenda Council, a member of the Omaha City Council running for mayor against the then-mayor, Hal Daub. She has since worked in a court clerk's office and in a staff position for Nebraska State Senator Justin Wayne, as well as the Urban Affairs Committee of the Nebraska Legislature. In 2018, she was hired by Jane Kleeb, the Nebraska Democratic State Party Chair, to assist with outreach activities. McKesson was introduced to Kleeb by Wayne.

In August 2018, McKesson was described by NBC News as "indicative of a new breed of Democratic operative - progressive, outspoken and authentic, even in a deep red state". At the time, McKesson served as the first Constituency Director for the Nebraska Democratic Party. In 2019, she became an ambassador for The United State of Women, a national advocacy and lobbying organization.

McKesson has served as the chair of the Nebraska Democratic Party's Black caucus since 2020. She was politically active in the Omaha, Nebraska area, organizing events, distributing signs, and registering voters. As a result of this work, McKesson was elected by Democratic Party voters in Nebraska's 2nd District to cast the district's electoral college vote, according to the Nebraska State party chair, Jane Kleeb. McKesson was the only elector in the state to cast a vote for the Democratic candidate. McKesson cast the electoral vote of the 2nd district of Nebraska for the Democratic candidate, Joe Biden. Her vote was seen as historic not only because she was the first African American woman to act as an elector for Nebraska, but also because she was able to cast her vote for Kamala Harris.

McKesson has also served as the Vice President of the board of directors for Neighborhoods USA, a national nonprofit organization, with her first term expiring in October 2021. She was also involved in organizing and hosting the first People of Color Political Convention, held in March 2021, to help improve voter turnout in municipal elections in Omaha. McKesson is also the President of the North Omaha Neighborhood Alliance.

On October 4, 2021, McKesson was appointed to the position of Special Assistant in the Office of Communications and Outreach in the U.S. Department of Education. In February 2022, she was announced as the executive director of Nebraska Democratic Party.

As executive director, McKesson supported the nomination of Kamala Harris following then-President Joe Biden dropping out of the 2024 United States presidential election. McKesson believed that Harris could win more support from youth voters, but Harris lost ground among youth voters in November.

== Personal life ==
McKesson has one daughter. She is also the caretaker for her younger brother since he was paralyzed from gunshot wounds in 2009. When McKesson cast her electoral college vote, she said she was thinking of her aunt, who died in 2018 after casting her first vote, and her grandmother, who worked for minimum wage as a housekeeper.
