= Jesse Jackson 1984 presidential campaign =

- Campaign: U.S. presidential election, 1984
- Candidate: Reverend Jesse Jackson Sr.
- Affiliation: Democratic Party
- Status: Withdrawn

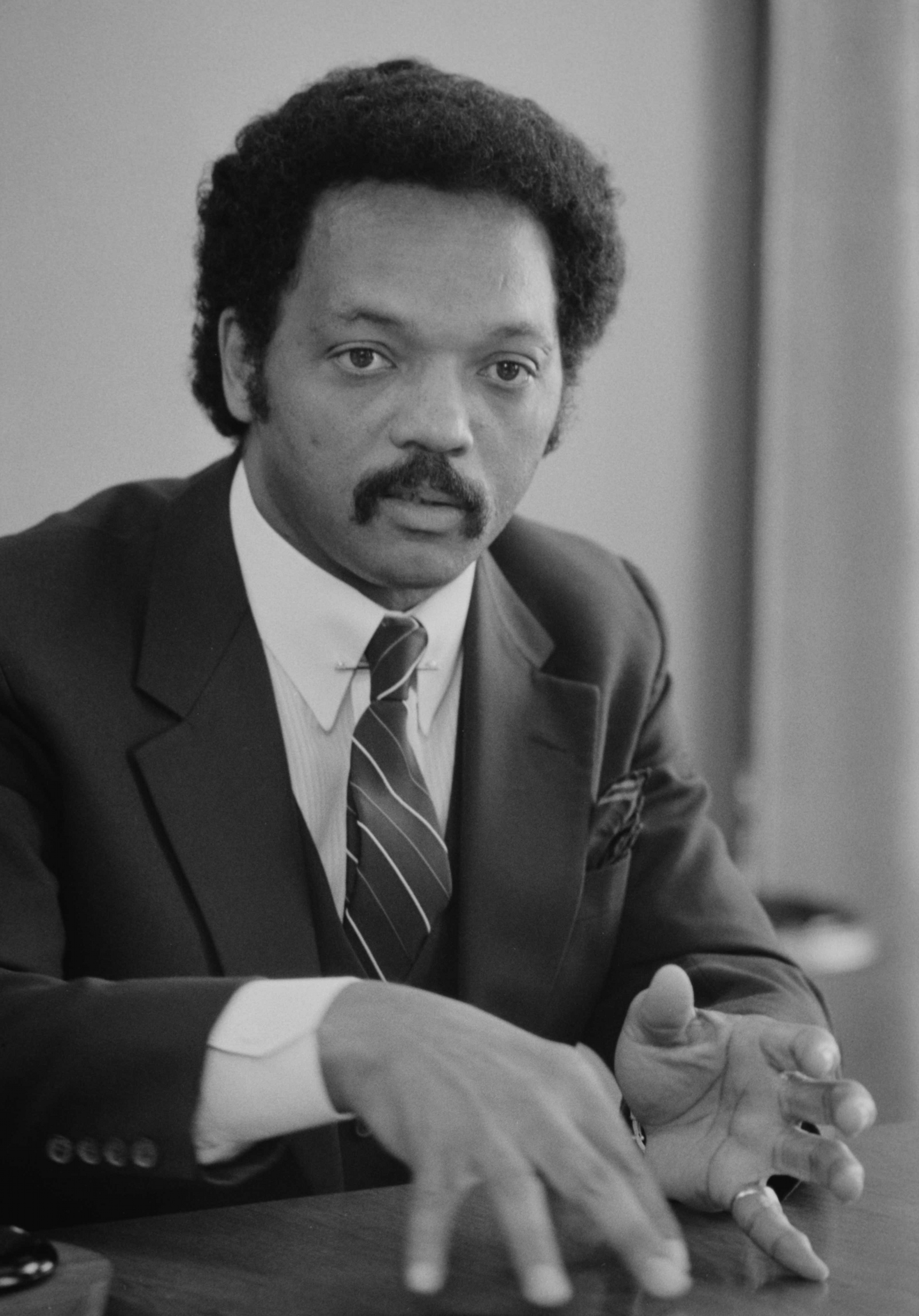

In 1984, Jesse Jackson became the second African American (after Shirley Chisholm) to mount a nationwide campaign for President of the United States, running as a Democrat.

In the primaries, Jackson, who had been written off by pundits as a fringe candidate with little chance at winning the nomination, surprised many when he took third place overall, behind Senator Gary Hart and former Vice President Walter Mondale, who eventually won the nomination. Jackson garnered 3,282,431 primary votes, or 18.2 percent of the total, in 1984.

He won five primaries and caucuses: Louisiana, the District of Columbia, South Carolina, Virginia, and one of two separate contests in Mississippi. He thus became the first African-American candidate to win any major-party state primary or caucus.

As he had gained 21 percent of the popular vote but only eight percent of delegates, Jackson afterwards complained that he had been handicapped by party rules. While Mondale (in the words of his aides) was determined to establish a precedent with his vice presidential candidate by picking a woman or visible minority, Jackson criticized the screening process as a "PR parade of personalities". He also mocked Mondale, saying that Hubert Humphrey was the "last significant politician out of the St. Paul–Minneapolis" area.

== Background ==
In May 1983, Jackson became the first African-American man since Reconstruction to address a joint session of the Alabama Legislature, where he said it was "about time we forgot about black and white and started talking about employed and unemployed." Art Harris saw Jackson as "testing the waters for a black presidential candidacy down South". In June, Jackson delivered a speech to 4,000 black Baptist ministers in Memphis bemoaning the fact that only 1 percent of American public officials were African-American despite blacks making up 12 percent of the population; the crowd responded with chants for him to "Run". Jackson's address to the National Congress of American Indians and touring of southern Texas to test his appeal among Hispanics fueled speculation he would run for president.

== Campaign platform ==
In both races, Jackson ran on what many considered to be a very liberal platform. Declaring that he wanted to create a "Rainbow Coalition" of various minority groups, including African Americans, Hispanics, Arab-Americans, Asian Americans, Native Americans, family farmers, the poor and working class, and homosexuals, as well as white progressives who fit into none of those categories, Jackson ran on a platform that included:

- creating a Works Progress Administration-style program to rebuild America's infrastructure and provide jobs to all Americans,
- reprioritizing the war on drugs to focus less on mandatory minimum sentences for drug users (which he views as racially biased) and more on harsher punishments for money-laundering bankers and others who are part of the "supply" end of "supply and demand"
- reversing Reaganomics-inspired tax cuts for the richest ten percent of Americans and using the money to finance social welfare programs
- cutting the budget of the Department of Defense by as much as fifteen percent over the course of his administration
- declaring Apartheid-era South Africa to be a rogue nation
- instituting an immediate nuclear freeze and beginning disarmament negotiations with the Soviet Union
- giving reparations to descendants of black slaves
- supporting family farmers by reviving many of FDR's New Deal-era farm programs
- creating a single-payer system of universal health care
- ratifying the Equal Rights Amendment
- increasing federal funding for lower-level public education and providing free community college to all
- applying stricter enforcement of the Voting Rights Act and
- supporting the formation of a Palestinian state.

With the exception of a resolution to implement sanctions against South Africa for its apartheid policies, none of these positions made it into the party's platform in either 1984 or 1988.

== Legacy ==
In 1984, a young Conrad Tillard worked as a coordinator of the presidential campaign, first in Philadelphia and then at Jackson's national headquarters in Washington, D.C. Years later Tillard said: "I became discouraged and almost bitter against the political process, because I felt that he was disrespected, but that was in my immaturity."

Jackson campaigned again in 1988 when he more than doubled his results.
