= 2020 United States House of Representatives elections in Nebraska =

- November 3, 2020

All 3 Nebraska seats to the United States House of Representatives
	Majority party	Minority party
Party	Republican	Democratic
Last election	3	0
Seats won	3	0
Seat change	Steady	Steady
Popular vote	585,234	326,018
Percentage	62.17%	34.63%
Swing	▲0.14%	▼3.34%

Republican
50–60%
60–70%
70–80%
80–90%
>90%
Democratic
40–50%

The 2020 United States House of Representatives elections in Nebraska was held on November 3, 2020, to elect the three U.S. representatives from the state of Nebraska, one from each of the state's three congressional districts. The elections coincided with the 2020 U.S. presidential election, as well as other elections to the House of Representatives, elections to the United States Senate, and various state and local elections.

== Overview ==
District	Republican		Democratic		Others		Total		Result
District	Votes	%	Votes	%	Votes	%	Votes	%	Result
District 1	189,006	59.52%	119,622	37.67%	8,938	2.81%	317,566	100.0%	Republican hold
District 2	171,071	50.77%	155,706	46.21%	10,185	3.02%	336,962	100.0%	Republican hold
District 3	225,157	78.51%	50,690	17.68%	10,923	3.81%	286,770	100.0%	Republican hold
Total	585,234	62.17%	326,018	34.63%	30,046	3.19%	941,298	100.0%	

Popular vote
Republican	62.17%
Democratic	34.63%
Other	3.19%

House seats
Republican	100.00%

== District 1 ==
2020 Nebraska's 1st congressional district election
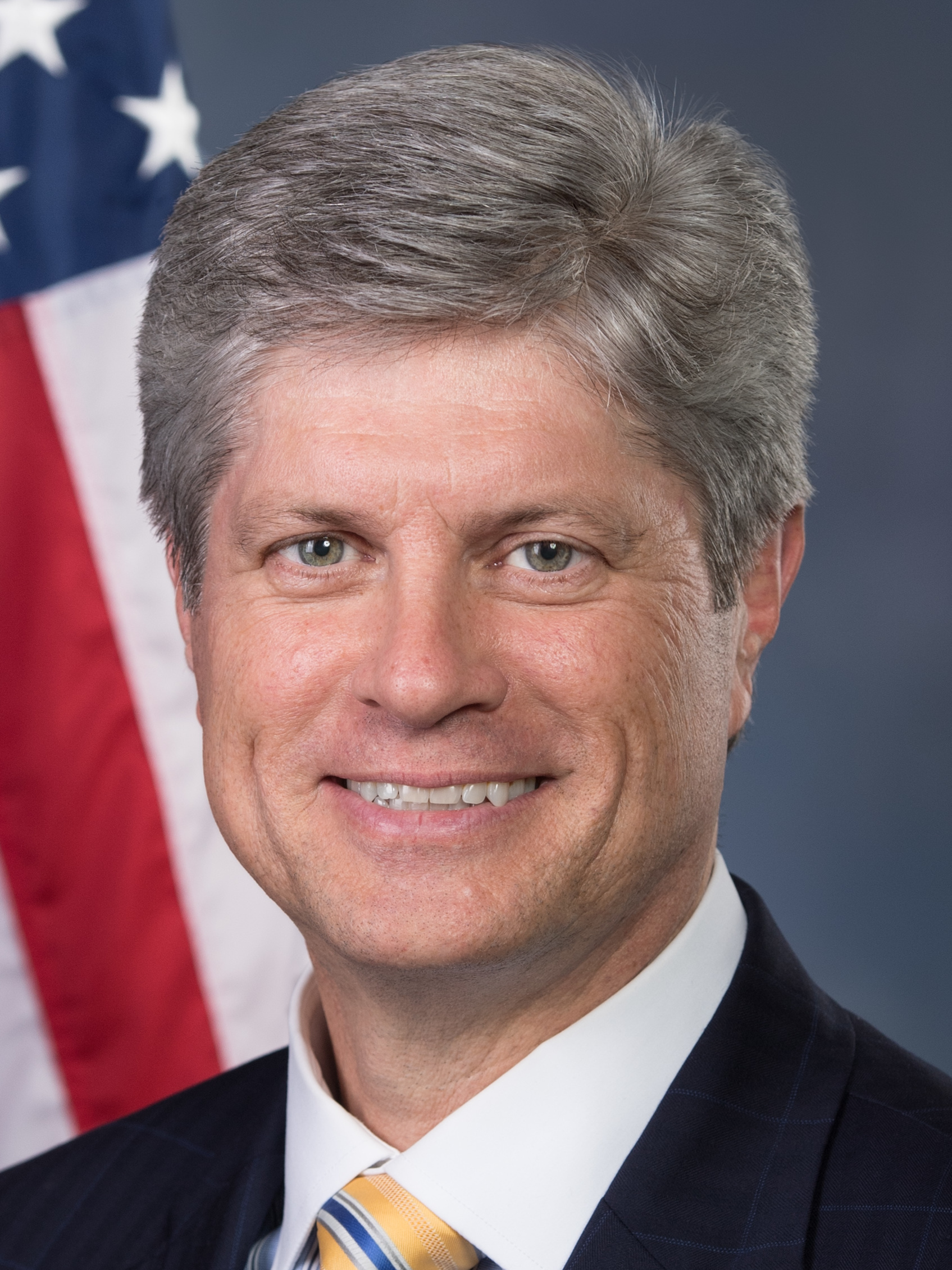

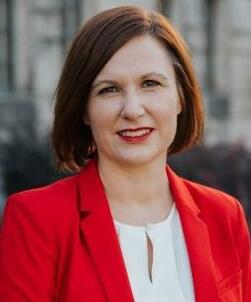
Nominee	Jeff Fortenberry	Kate Bolz
Party	Republican	Democratic
Popular vote	189,006	119,622
Percentage	59.5%	37.7%
- County results Fortenberry: 50–60% 60–70% 70–80% 80–90% Bolz: 40–50%
U.S. Representative before election
Jeff Fortenberry
Republican
Elected U.S. Representative
Jeff Fortenberry
Republican

The 1st district is located in eastern Nebraska surrounding Omaha and its suburbs, taking in Lincoln, Bellevue, Fremont, and Norfolk. The incumbent was Republican Jeff Fortenberry, who was re-elected with 60.4% of the vote in 2018.

=== Republican primary ===
==== Candidates ====
===== Declared =====
- Jeff Fortenberry, incumbent U.S. representative

===== Declined =====
- Nicholas Oviatt, part-time consultant

=== Results ===
Republican primary results
Party	Candidate	Votes	%
Republican	Jeff Fortenberry (incumbent)	84,017	100.0
Total votes		84,017	100.0

=== Democratic primary ===
==== Candidates ====
===== Declared =====
- Kate Bolz, state senator
- Barbara "Babs" Ramsey, security analyst

===== Endorsements =====
Kate Bolz

Newspapers

- Lincoln Journal Star

Organizations

- American Federation of Labor and Congress of Industrial Organizations (AFL-CIO)
- League of Conservation Voters Action Fund
- Lincoln Firefighters Association
- Nebraska Association of Public Employees
- Sierra Club
Barbara "Babs" Ramsey

Organizations

- DUH! Demand Universal Healthcare
- Freethought Equality Fund PAC
- Nebraska Secular Democrats
- Progressive Rising
- Rose Caucus
- Vote Pro Choice

==== Results ====
Democratic primary results
Party	Candidate	Votes	%
Democratic	Kate Bolz	43,400	77.6
Democratic	Barbara Ramsey	12,497	22.4
Total votes		55,897	100.0

=== Libertarian primary ===
==== Candidates ====
===== Declared =====
- Dennis B. Grace, U.S. Navy veteran

==== Results ====
Libertarian primary results
Party	Candidate	Votes	%
Libertarian	Dennis B. Grace	1,047	100.0
Total votes		1,047	100.0

=== General election ===
==== Debate ====
2020 Nebraska's 1st congressional district debate
No.	Date	Host	Moderator	Link	Republican	Democratic
Key: P Participant A Absent N Not invited I Invited W Withdrawn						
Key: P Participant A Absent N Not invited I Invited W Withdrawn					Jeff Fortenberry	Kate Bolz
1	Oct. 14, 2020	Nebraska Public Media	Dennis Kellogg		P	P

==== Predictions ====
Source	Ranking	As of
The Cook Political Report	Safe R	July 2, 2020
Inside Elections	Safe R	June 2, 2020
Sabato's Crystal Ball	Safe R	July 2, 2020
Politico	Likely R	September 9, 2020
Daily Kos	Safe R	June 3, 2020
RCP	Safe R	June 9, 2020
Niskanen	Safe R	June 7, 2020

==== Results ====
Nebraska's 1st congressional district, 2020
Party	Candidate	Votes	%
Republican	Jeff Fortenberry (incumbent)	189,006	59.5
Democratic	Kate Bolz	119,622	37.7
Libertarian	Dennis B. Grace	8,938	2.8
Total votes		317,566	100.0
Republican hold			

== District 2 ==
2020 Nebraska's 2nd congressional district election
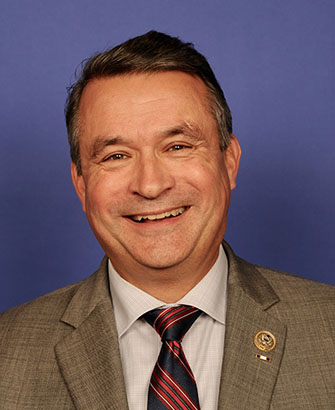

Nominee	Don Bacon	Kara Eastman
Party	Republican	Democratic
Popular vote	171,071	155,706
Percentage	50.8%	46.2%
- County results Bacon: 60–70% Eastman: 40–50%
U.S. Representative before election
Don Bacon
Republican
Elected U.S. Representative
Don Bacon
Republican

The 2nd district covers the Omaha metropolitan area, including all of Douglas County, home to the city of Omaha, and suburban parts of western Sarpy County, including La Vista and Papillon. The incumbent was Republican Don Bacon, who was re-elected with 51.0% of the vote in 2018.

Kara Eastman was the Democratic nominee. She started a nonprofit consulting company in 2019, and was previously the executive director of the Omaha Healthy Kids Alliance. That organization focuses on reducing lead poisoning, and Lee Terry described it as a nonpartisan project. She is a former member of the Board of Governors of Metropolitan Community College.

President Donald Trump endorsed Bacon, and Democratic presidential nominee Joe Biden endorsed Eastman.

=== Republican primary ===
==== Candidates ====
===== Declared =====
- Paul Anderson, perennial candidate
- Don Bacon, incumbent U.S. representative

===== Endorsements =====
Don Bacon
- Donald Trump, 45th president of the United States

==== Results ====
Republican primary results
Party	Candidate	Votes	%
Republican	Don Bacon (incumbent)	68,531	90.6
Republican	Paul Anderson	7,106	9.4
Total votes		75,637	100.0

=== Democratic primary ===
==== Candidates ====
===== Declared =====
- Ann Ashford, attorney and wife of former U.S. Representative Brad Ashford
- Kara Eastman, nonprofit executive and nominee for Nebraska's 2nd congressional district in 2018
- Gladys Harrison, general manager of Big Mama's Kitchen

===== Withdrew =====
- Morgann Freeman, part-time communications consultant and activist (endorsed Ashford)
- Dustin Sedoris, U.S. Marine Corps veteran (endorsed Eastman)

===== Declined =====
- Heath Mello, chief lobbyist for the University of Nebraska system, former state senator, and nominee for mayor of Omaha in 2017
- Denise Blaya Powell, founder of Women Who Run

==== Endorsements ====
Ann Ashford

U.S. senators

- Bob Kerrey, former senator from Nebraska and former governor of Nebraska
- Ben Nelson, former senator from Nebraska and former governor of Nebraska

U.S. representatives

- Brad Ashford, former representative from Nebraska's 2nd congressional district and husband of Ann Ashford
- John Joseph Cavanaugh III, former representative from Nebraska's 2nd congressional district
- John Delaney, former representative from Maryland's 6th congressional district

Statewide officials

- Kim Robak, former lieutenant governor of Nebraska

State officials

- Burke Harr, former state senator
- Gwen Howard, former state senator
- Bob Krist, former state senator and Democratic nominee for Governor of Nebraska in 2018
- Steve Lathrop, state senator

Individuals

- Michael Fahey, former mayor of Omaha

Organizations

- LEAP Forward Project
Kara Eastman

U.S. senators

- Elizabeth Warren, U.S. senator from Massachusetts

U.S. representatives

- Lisa Blunt Rochester, representative from Delaware's at-large congressional district
- Lois Frankel, representative from Florida's 21st congressional district
- Pramila Jayapal, representative from Washington's 7th congressional district
- Ro Khanna, representative from California's 17th congressional district
- Alexandria Ocasio-Cortez, representative from New York's 14th congressional district
- Mark Pocan, representative from Wisconsin's 2nd congressional district
- Jamie Raskin, representative from Maryland's 8th congressional district

State officials

- Tanya Cook, former state senator
- Brenda Council, Omaha city councilwoman and former state senator
- Megan Hunt, state senator
- Justin Wayne, state senator

Local officials

- Mike Boyle, county commissioner and former mayor of Omaha
- Marian Fey, former member of the Omaha public schools board
- Ben Gray, Omaha city councilman
- Jay Irwin, member of the Ralston school board
- Tim Rouse, former president of the Omaha city council
- Amanda Ryan, member of the Omaha public school board
- Marque Snow, president of the Omaha public school board
- Jim Suttle, former mayor of Omaha

Individuals

- Roger Garcia, member of the Metropolitan Community College board
- Mondaire Jones, 2020 Democratic nominee for New York's 17th congressional district
- Alexander Payne, filmmaker
- Mark Ruffalo, actor
- Barbara Weitz, member of the University of Nebraska Board of Regents
- Michael Young, member of the Metropolitan Community College Board

Organizations

- American Progressives in STEM
- Brand New Congress
- Congressional Progressive Caucus
- Courage to Change
- Democracy for America
- Justice Democrats
- National Organization for Women
- Peace Action
- Progressive Change Campaign Committee
- Progressive Rising
- Sierra Club
- Warren Democrats

Parties

- Cannabis Rights Party of Nebraska

==== Results ====
Democratic primary results
Party	Candidate	Votes	%
Democratic	Kara Eastman	45,953	62.1
Democratic	Ann Ashford	23,059	31.2
Democratic	Gladys Harrison	4,920	6.7
Total votes		73,932	100.0

=== Libertarian primary ===
==== Candidates ====
===== Declared =====
- Tyler Schaeffer

==== Results ====
Libertarian primary results
Party	Candidate	Votes	%
Libertarian	Tyler Schaeffer	964	100.0
Total votes		964	100.0

=== General election ===
==== Debate ====
2020 Nebraska's 2nd congressional district debate
No.	Date	Host	Moderator	Link	Republican	Democratic
Key: P Participant A Absent N Not invited I Invited W Withdrawn						
Key: P Participant A Absent N Not invited I Invited W Withdrawn					Don Bacon	Kara Eastman
1	Oct. 12, 2020	Nebraska Public Media	Dennis Kellogg		P	P

==== Predictions ====
Source	Ranking	As of
The Cook Political Report	Tossup	July 16, 2020
Inside Elections	Tilt D (flip)	October 28, 2020
Sabato's Crystal Ball	Lean R	November 2, 2020
Politico	Tossup	September 9, 2020
Daily Kos	Lean R	June 3, 2020
RCP	Tossup	June 9, 2020
Niskanen	Tossup	June 7, 2020

==== Polling ====
View source data.

Poll source	Date(s) administered	Sample size (Note: Key: A – all adults RV – registered voters LV – likely voters V – unclear)	Margin of error	Don Bacon (R)	Kara Eastman (D)	Tyler Schaeffer (L)	Other	Undecided
UNLV Lee Business School	October 30 – November 2, 2020	191 (LV)	± 7%	47%	46%	–	–	–
Change Research	October 29 – November 2, 2020	920 (LV)	± 3.5%	47%	48%	2%	0% (Note: Did not vote and "Don't recall" with 0%)	2%
Emerson College	October 29–30, 2020	806 (LV)	± 3.5%	50% (Note: With voters who lean towards a given candidate)	47%	–	2%	–
FM3 Research (D) (Note: Poll sponsored by The Congressional Progressive Caucus PAC exclusively supports Democratic candidates.)	October 1–4, 2020	450 (LV)	± 4.6%	45%	47%	6%	–	–
Siena College/NYT Upshot	September 25–27, 2020	420 (LV)	± 5.3%	45%	43%	3%	1% (Note: Would not vote with 1%; "someone else" with 0%)	8% (Note: Includes "Refused")
Global Strategy Group (D) (Note: Poll conducted for the House Majority PAC.)	September 14–16, 2020	400 (LV)	± 4.9%	45%	45%	4%	–	7%
Global Strategy Group (D)	July 27–29, 2020	400 (LV)	± 4.9%	47%	42%	4%	–	7%
GQR Research (D) (Note: Poll sponsored by Eastman's campaign)	June 30 – July 5, 2020	502 (LV)	± 4.37%	49%	50%	–	–	–
DCCC Targeting and Analytics Department (D) (Note: Poll sponsored by the DCCC.)	May 7–10, 2020	448 (LV)	± 4.6%	47%	48%	–	–	–
GQR Research (D)	September 9–12, 2019	400 (LV)	± 4.9%	50%	49%	–	–	–

Hypothetical polling

with Ann Ashford

Poll source	Date(s) administered	Sample size	Margin of error	Don Bacon (R)	Ann Ashford (D)	Undecided
GQR Research (D)	September 9–12, 2019	400 (LV)	± 4.9%	53%	46%	–

with Gladys Harrison

Poll source	Date(s) administered	Sample size	Margin of error	Don Bacon (R)	Gladys Harrison (D)	Undecided
GQR Research (D)	September 9–12, 2019	400 (LV)	± 4.9%	55%	44%	–

==== Post-primary endorsements ====
Don Bacon (R)

Federal officials

- Brad Ashford, former U.S. representative from NE-02 (Democratic)
- Deb Fischer, U.S. senator from Nebraska
- Joe Lieberman, former U.S. senator from Connecticut (1989–2013) (Independent / Democratic)
- Jim Moran, former U.S. representative (VA-08) (1991–2015) (Democratic)

State officials

- Bob Krist, former state senator (2009–2019) and 2018 Democratic gubernatorial nominee (Democratic)
- Pete Ricketts, governor

Local officials

- Carroll Smith, mayor of Valley (Democratic)
- Jean Stothert, mayor of Omaha

Organizations

- National Right to Life Committee

Individuals

- Barry Rubin, former Nebraska Democratic Party executive director (2003–2006) (Democratic)
Kara Eastman (D)

Former US executive branch officials

- Joe Biden, 47th vice president of the United States and 2020 Democratic nominee for president
- Barack Obama, former president of the United States (2009–2017, former senator from Illinois (2005–2008)

Federal officials

- Judy Chu, U.S. representative (CA-27)
- John Delaney, former U.S. representative (MD_06)
- Debbie Dingell, U.S. representative from (MI-12)
- Kirsten Gillibrand, U.S. senator from New York and former 2020 presidential candidate
- Deb Haaland, U.S. representative (NM-01)
- Kamala Harris, U.S. senator from California; 2020 vice presidential nominee
- Bob Kerrey, former U.S. senator from Nebraska (1989–2001) and Governor (1983–1987)
- Andy Levin, U.S. representative (MI-09)
- Ted Lieu, U.S. representative (CA-33)
- Katie Porter, U.S. representative (CA-45)
- Bernie Sanders, U.S. senator from Vermont and former 2016 and 2020 presidential candidate
- Jan Schakowsky, U.S. representative (IL-09)
- Eric Swalwell, U.S. representative (CA-15)
- Mark Takano, U.S. representative (CA-41)

State officials

- Kate Bolz, state senator and 2020 Democratic nominee in NE-01
- John S. McCollister, Nebraska state senator (Republican)

Local officials

- Chris Jerram, Omaha City Council president

Individuals

- Jamaal Bowman, 2020 Democratic nominee for New York's 16th congressional district
- Gladys Harrison, local business owner and 2020 Democratic candidate in NE-02
- Mondaire Jones, 2020 Democratic nominee for New York's 17th congressional district
- Jim Simon, business owner and 2002 Democratic nominee in NE-02

Organizations

- Democratic Congressional Campaign Committee
- EMILY's List
- End Citizens United
- Everytown for Gun Safety Action Fund
- League of Conservation Voters Action Fund
- Let America Vote
- Nebraska Democratic Party
- Planned Parenthood Action Fund

==== Results ====
Despite Democratic Presidential Nominee Joe Biden winning the district by 6.5 points, Bacon defeated Eastman by 4.6 points. Eastman underperformed Biden by over 11 points.

Nebraska's 2nd congressional district, 2020
Party	Candidate	Votes	%
Republican	Don Bacon (incumbent)	171,071	50.8
Democratic	Kara Eastman	155,706	46.2
Libertarian	Tyler Schaeffer	10,185	3.0
Total votes		336,962	100.0
Republican hold			

==== By county ====
County	Don Bacon Republican		Kara Eastman Democratic		Tyler Schaeffer Libertarian		Total votes
County	%	#	%	#	%	#	Total votes
Douglas	48.20%	132,230	48.79%	133,827	3.01%	8,252	274,309
Sarpy	61.99%	38,841	34.92%	21,879	3.09%	1,933	62,653

== District 3 ==
2020 Nebraska's 3rd congressional district election
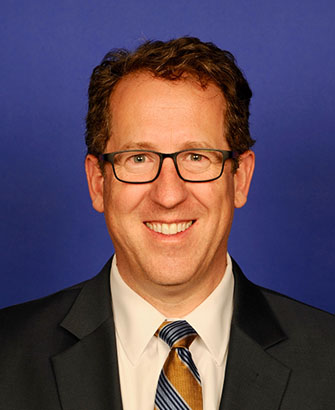

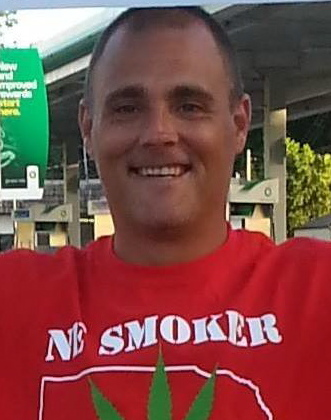
Nominee	Adrian Smith	Mark Elworth Jr.
Party	Republican	Democratic
Popular vote	225,157	50,690
Percentage	78.5%	17.7%
- County results Smith: 50–60% 60–70% 70–80% 80–90% >90%
U.S. Representative before election
Adrian Smith
Republican
Elected U.S. Representative
Adrian Smith
Republican

The 3rd district covers most of the rural western part of the state, and includes Grand Island, Kearney, Hastings, North Platte, Alliance, and Scottsbluff. The incumbent was Republican Adrian Smith, who was re-elected with 76.7% of the vote in 2018.

=== Republican primary ===
==== Candidates ====
===== Declared =====
- Larry Lee Scott Bolinger, veteran, graduate from UNO, business owner in property preservation, author of 16 books, and self-defense instructor
- William Elfgren, grocery worker
- Arron Kowalski, farmer
- Justin Moran, architectural draftsman, firefighter and welder
- Adrian Smith, incumbent U.S. representative

==== Results ====
Republican primary results
Party	Candidate	Votes	%
Republican	Adrian Smith (incumbent)	96,260	82.6
Republican	Arron Kowalski	6,424	5.5
Republican	Justin Moran	6,374	5.5
Republican	William Elfgren	4,063	3.5
Republican	Larry Lee Scott Bolinger	3,389	2.9
Total votes		116,510	100.0

=== Democratic primary ===
==== Results ====
Democratic primary results
Party	Candidate	Votes	%
Democratic	Mark Elworth, Jr.	26,772	100.0
Total votes		26,776	100.0

=== Libertarian primary ===
==== Candidates ====
===== Declared =====
- Dustin C. Hobbs, reality television show participant

==== Results ====
Libertarian primary results
Party	Candidate	Votes	%
Libertarian	Dustin C. Hobbs	561	100.0
Total votes		561	100.0

=== General election ===
==== Predictions ====
Source	Ranking	As of
The Cook Political Report	Safe R	July 2, 2020
Inside Elections	Safe R	June 2, 2020
Sabato's Crystal Ball	Safe R	July 2, 2020
Politico	Safe R	September 9, 2020
Daily Kos	Safe R	June 3, 2020
RCP	Safe R	June 9, 2020
Niskanen	Safe R	June 7, 2020

==== Results ====
Nebraska's 3rd congressional district, 2020
Party	Candidate	Votes	%
Republican	Adrian Smith (incumbent)	225,157	78.5
Democratic	Mark Elworth Jr.	50,690	17.7
Libertarian	Dustin C. Hobbs	10,923	3.8
Total votes		286,770	100.0
Republican hold			

== See also ==
- 2020 Nebraska elections

== Notes ==
Partisan clients
