= 2024 Nebraska Legislature election =

- November 5, 2024; Officially nonpartisan

25 of the 49 seats in the Nebraska Legislature 25 (Note: In Nebraska, a two-thirds vote of all members is required to overcome a filibuster. Thus, 33 votes are required to hold a filibuster-proof majority.) seats needed for a majority
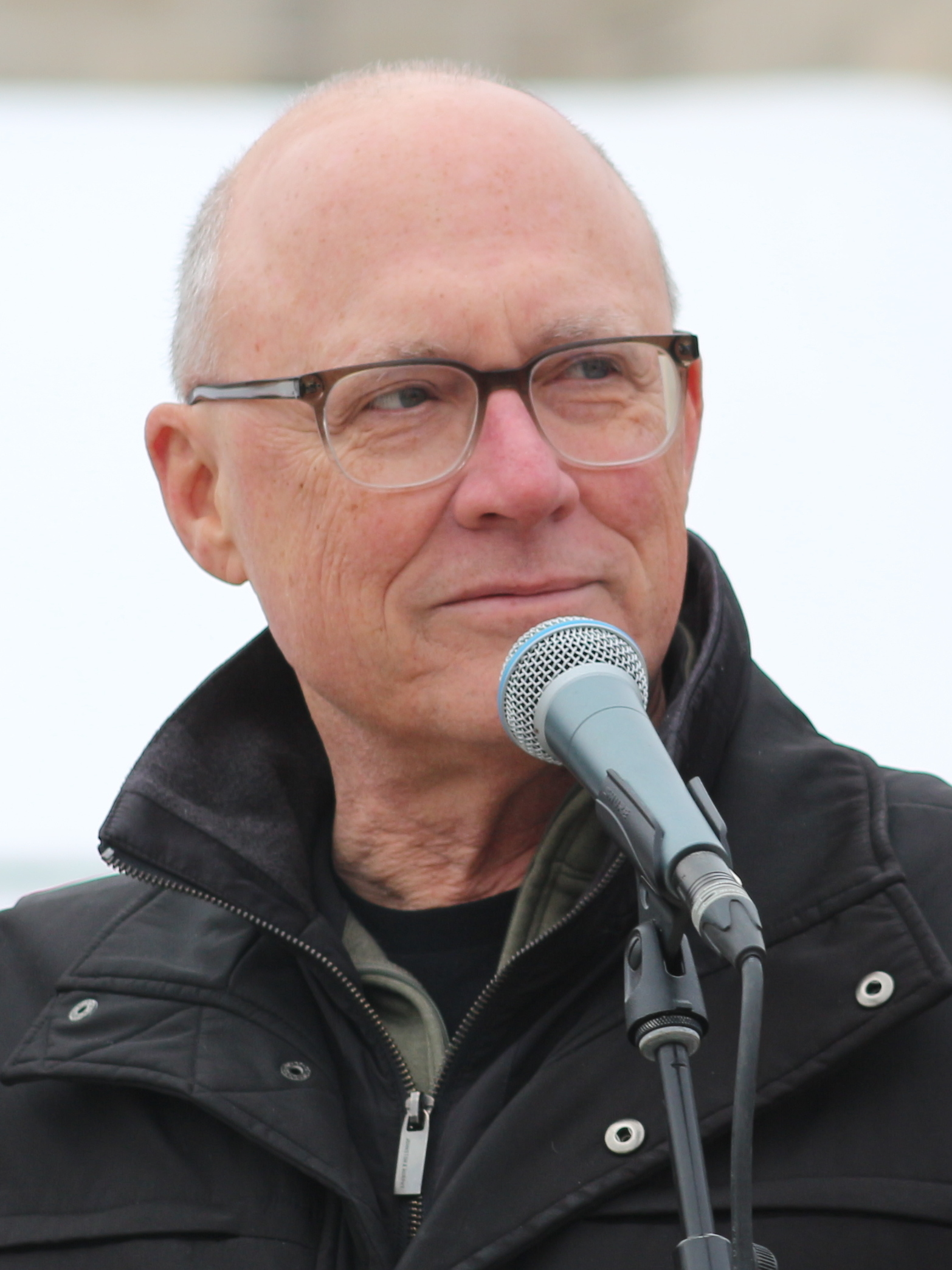
	Majority party	Minority party	Third party
		Dem
Leader	John Arch	None	None
Party	Republican	Democratic	Independent
Leader since	January 4, 2023	n/a	n/a
Leader's seat	14th district	n/a	n/a
Last election	32	17	0
Seats before	33 (Note: Mike McDonnell of Omaha was elected as a Democrat but switched his affiliation to the Republican Party in April 2024.)	15 (Note: Megan Hunt of Omaha was elected as a Democrat but switched party affiliation to Independent in May 2023.)	1
Seats won	33	15	1
Seat change	Steady	Steady	Steady
Popular vote	244,930	117,830	22,160
Percentage	62.46%	30.05%	5.66%
Swing	▼5.62pp	▲2.81pp	▲5.66pp
- Democratic gain Republican gain Democratic hold Republican hold 50–60% 60–70% 70–80% 50–60% 70–80% Uncontested
Speaker before election
John Arch
Republican
Elected Speaker
John Arch
Republican

The 2024 Nebraska State Legislature elections took place as part of the biennial United States elections. Nebraska voters elected state senators (Note: Although Nebraska's legislature is unicameral, the officeholders are called Senators.) for the 25 odd-numbered seats of the 49 (Note: The even-numbered districts were elected in 2022 and will be up for election again in 2026.) legislative districts in the Nebraska Unicameral. State senators serve four-year terms in the Nebraska Legislature. All elections are technically non-partisan in the State Legislature; therefore, any parties listed are from candidates' websites and official party endorsement lists. Candidates all appear on the ballot as nonpartisan. Senators are limited to two consecutive terms, after which they must wait four years before running again.

== Overview ==
↓
33	1	15
Republican	I	Democratic

Summary of the November 5, 2024 Nebraska Legislature election results
Parties	Candidates	Votes		Seats		
Parties	Candidates	No.	%	Before	After	+/-
Republican	29	244,930	62.46	33	33	Steady
Democrat	18	117,830	30.05	15	15	Steady
Independent Democrat	2	22,160	5.66	1	1	Steady
Independent	1	7,156	1.83	0	0	Steady
Libertarian	0	0	0.00	0	0	Steady
Green	0	0	0.00	0	0	Steady
Write-ins	–	0	0.00	0	0	Steady
Total	49	392,076	100.00	49	49	

Senate seats
Republican	69.39%
Democratic	28.57%
Independent	2.04%

== Summary by district ==
In the 2020 Presidential Election, Republican Donald Trump received the most votes in 34 of Nebraska's legislative districts and Democrat Joe Biden received the most votes in 15 districts. Out of the 25 districts which have elections in 2024, there are three districts where Donald Trump won the most votes in 2020 that a Democrat currently represents: District 3, based in Sarpy County (Trump +7%); District 15, based in Dodge County (Trump +33%); and District 49, based in Sarpy County (Trump +12%).

Biden 50–60% 60–70% 70–80% 80–90% / Trump 40–50% 50–60% 60–70% 70–80% 80–90%

District		Incumbent				Candidates
Location	2020 pres.	Member	Party	First elected	Status	Candidates
1	R+42.9	Julie Slama	Republican	2019 (appointed)	Incumbent retired. Republican hold.	Primary election: ▌ Dennis Schaardt (Republican) 45.10%; ▌ Robert Hallstrom (Republican) 33.80%; ▌ Glenda Willnerd (Democratic) 16.49%; ▌Bob Holman (Republican) 4.61%; General election: ▌ Robert Hallstrom (Republican) 51.75%; ▌Dennis Schaardt (Republican) 48.25%
3	R+6.6	Carol Blood	Democratic	2016	Incumbent term-limited. Democratic hold.	Primary election: ▌ Felix Ungerman (Republican) 53.06%; ▌ Victor Rountree (Democratic) 46.94%; General election: ▌ Victor Rountree (Democratic) 50.57%; ▌Felix Ungerman (Republican) 49.43%
5	D+21.5	Mike McDonnell	Republican	2016	Incumbent term-limited. Democratic gain.	Primary election: ▌ Margo Juarez (Democratic) 37.68%; ▌ Gilbert Ayala (Republican) 35.95%; ▌Flint Harkness (Democratic) 26.36%; General election: ▌ Margo Juarez (Democratic) 57.65%; ▌Gilbert Ayala (Republican) 42.35%
7	D+40.6	Tony Vargas	Democratic	2016	Incumbent term-limited. Democratic hold.	Primary election: ▌ Dunixi Guereca (Democratic) 34.02%; ▌ Tim Pendrell (Democratic) 24.56%; ▌Ben Salazar (Independent) 22.31%; ▌Christopher Geary (Democratic) 20.36%; General election: ▌ Dunixi Guereca (Democratic) 57.71%; ▌Tim Pendrell (Democratic) 42.29%
9	D+44	John Cavanaugh	Democratic	2020	Incumbent re-elected. Democratic hold.	Primary election: ▌ John Cavanaugh (Democratic) 70.09%; ▌ Julia Palzer (Republican) 29.91%; General election: ▌ John Cavanaugh (Democratic) 70.14%; ▌Julia Palzer (Republican) 29.86%
11	D+70.5	Terrell McKinney	Democratic	2020	Incumbent re-elected. Democratic hold.	Primary election: ▌ Terrell McKinney (Democratic) 44.60%; ▌ Ernie Chambers (Independent) 44.50%; ▌Calandra Cooper (Independent) 10.89%; General election: ▌ Terrell McKinney (Democratic)
13	D+29.6	Justin Wayne	Democratic	2016	Incumbent term-limited. Democratic hold.	Primary election: ▌ Nick Batter (Independent) 37.94%; ▌ Ashlei Spivey (Democratic) 24.04%; ▌Tracy Hightower-Henne (Democratic) 23.42%; ▌Matthew Clough (Republican) 15.00%; General election: ▌ Ashlei Spivey (Democratic) 50.52%; ▌Nick Batter (Independent) 49.48%
15	R+33.2	Lynne Walz	Democratic	2016	Incumbent term-limited. Republican gain.	Primary election: ▌ Dave Wordekemper (Republican) 43.76%; ▌ Roxie Kracl (Republican) 25.19%; ▌Anthony Hanson (Republican) 18.92%; ▌Scott Thomas (Republican) 6.21%; ▌Peter Mayberry (Democratic) 5.92%; General election: ▌ Dave Wordekemper (Republican) 52.72%; ▌Roxie Kracl (Republican) 47.28%
17	R+25.2	Joni Albrecht	Republican	2016	Incumbent term-limited. Republican hold.	Primary election: ▌ Mike Albrecht (Republican) 40.71%; ▌ Glen Meyer (Republican) 32.27%; ▌Cindy Kai (Democratic) 27.02%; General election: ▌ Glen Meyer (Republican) 52.3%; ▌Mike Albrecht (Republican) 47.7%
19	R+56.5	Rob Dover	Republican	2022 (appointed)	Incumbent re-elected. Republican hold.	Primary election: ▌ Jeanne Reigle (Republican) 38.88%; ▌ Rob Dover (Republican) 36.44%; ▌Melissa Temple (Democratic) 24.68%; General election: ▌ Rob Dover (Republican) 54.57%; ▌Jeanne Reigle (Republican) 45.43%
21	R+9.6	Beau Ballard	Republican	2023 (appointed)	Incumbent re-elected. Republican hold.	Primary election: ▌ Beau Ballard (Republican) 54.39%; ▌ Seth Derner (Democratic) 30.27%; ▌Bryan Paseka (Democratic) 15.34%; General election: ▌ Beau Ballard (Republican) 55.29%; ▌Seth Derner (Democratic) 44.71%
23	R+47.5	Bruce Bostelman	Republican	2016	Incumbent term-limited. Republican hold.	Primary election: ▌ Jared Storm (Republican) 34.90%; ▌ Dennis Fujan (Republican) 24.60%; ▌Allie French (Republican) 14.22%; ▌Larissa Schultz (Democratic) 12.46%; ▌Alan Zavodny (Republican) 7.86%; ▌Jacob Wolff (Republican) 5.96%; General election: ▌ Jared Storm (Republican) 54.86%; ▌Dennis Fujan (Republican) 45.14%
25	R+4.5	Carolyn Bosn	Republican	2023 (Appointed)	Incumbent re-elected. Republican hold.	Primary election: ▌ Carolyn Bosn (Republican) 55.39%; ▌ Nicki Behmer Popp (Independent Dem.) 41.71%; ▌Aurang Zeb (Democratic) 2.90%; General election: ▌ Carolyn Bosn (Republican) 53.01%; ▌Nicki Behmer Popp (Independent Dem.) 46.99%
27	D+7.7	Anna Wishart	Democratic	2016	Incumbent term-limited. Democratic hold.	Primary election: ▌ Jason Prokop (Democratic) 56.33%; ▌ Dawn Liphardt (Republican) 43.67%; General election: ▌ Jason Prokop (Democratic) 52.55%; ▌Dawn Liphardt (Republican) 47.45%
29	D+23.6	Eliot Bostar	Democratic	2020	Incumbent re-elected. Democratic hold.	Primary election: ▌ Eliot Bostar (Democratic) 100.0%; General election: ▌ Eliot Bostar (Democratic) 100.0%
31	R+8	Kathleen Kauth	Republican	2022 (appointed)	Incumbent re-elected. Republican hold.	Primary election: ▌ Kathleen Kauth (Republican) 59.14%; ▌ Mary Ann Folchert (Democratic) 40.86%; General election: ▌ Kathleen Kauth (Republican) 54.06%; ▌Mary Ann Folchert (Democratic) 45.94%
33	R+46.7	Steve Halloran	Republican	2016	Incumbent term-limited. Republican hold.	Primary election: ▌ Dan Lonowski (Republican) 39.94%; ▌ Michelle Smith (Democratic) 28.87%; ▌Paul Hamelink (Republican) 18.33%; ▌Joshua Frederick (Republican) 12.86%; General election: ▌ Dan Lonowski (Republican) 67.31%; ▌Michelle Smith (Democratic) 32.69%
35	R+23.4	Ray Aguilar	Republican	2020	Incumbent lost re-election. Democratic gain.	Primary election: ▌ Dan Quick (Democratic) 51.10%; ▌ Ray Aguilar (Republican) 48.90%; General election: ▌ Dan Quick (Democratic) 50.68%; ▌Ray Aguilar (Republican) 49.32%
37	R+37.4	John Lowe	Republican	2016	Incumbent term-limited. Republican hold.	Primary election: ▌ Stan Clouse (Republican) 57.77%; ▌ Lana Peister (Republican) 32.61%; ▌Nathan Leach (Independent) 9.62%; General election: ▌ Stan Clouse (Republican) 58.77%; ▌Lana Peister (Republican) 41.23%
39	R+23.3	Lou Ann Linehan	Republican	2016	Incumbent term-limited. Republican hold.	Primary election: ▌ Tony Sorrentino (Republican) 51.90%; ▌ Allison Heimes (Independent Dem.) 48.90%; General election: ▌ Tony Sorrentino (Republican) 52.09%; ▌Allison Heimes (Independent Dem.) 47.91%
41	R+62.7	Fred Meyer	Republican	2023 (appointed)	Incumbent retiring. Republican hold.	Primary election: ▌ Dan McKeon (Republican) 45.19%; ▌ Ethan Clark (Republican) 39.21%; ▌Nadine Bane (Republican) 15.60%; General election: ▌ Dan McKeon (Republican) 52.04%; ▌Ethan Clark (Republican) 47.96%
43	R+68.5	Tom Brewer	Republican	2016	Incumbent term-limited. Republican hold.	Primary election: ▌ Tanya Storer (Republican) 58.53%; ▌ Tony Tangwall (Republican) 41.47%; General election: ▌ Tanya Storer (Republican) 60.72%; ▌Tony Tangwall (Republican) 39.28%
45	R+5.4	Rita Sanders	Republican	2020	Incumbent re-elected. Republican hold.	Primary election: ▌ Rita Sanders (Republican) 58.43%; ▌ Sarah Centineo (Democratic) 41.87%; General election: ▌ Rita Sanders (Republican) 52.87%; ▌Sarah Centineo (Democratic) 47.13%
47	R+64.2	Steve Erdman	Republican	2016	Incumbent term-limited. Republican hold.	Primary election: ▌ Paul Strommen (Republican) 77.13%; ▌ Larry Bolinger (Democratic) 22.87%; General election: ▌ Paul Strommen (Republican) 77.15%; ▌Larry Bolinger (Democratic) 22.85%
49	R+11.6	Jen Day	Democratic	2020	Incumbent lost re-election. Republican gain.	Primary election: ▌ Jen Day (Democratic) 42.87%; ▌ Bob Anderson (Republican) 34.67%; ▌Caleb Muhs (Republican) 22.47%; General election: ▌ Bob Anderson (Republican) 52.12%; ▌Jen Day (Democratic) 47.88%

== Retirements ==
Fifteen incumbents did not seek re-election.

=== Democrats ===
1. District 3: Carol Blood was term-limited (ran for U.S. Representative).
2. District 7: Tony Vargas was term-limited (ran for U.S. Representative).
3. District 13: Justin Wayne was term-limited.
4. District 15: Lynne Walz was term-limited.
5. District 27: Anna Wishart was term-limited.

=== Republicans ===
1. District 1: Julie Slama retired.
2. District 5: Mike McDonnell was term-limited.
3. District 17: Joni Albrecht was term-limited.
4. District 23: Bruce Bostelman was term-limited.
5. District 33: Steve Halloran was term-limited.
6. District 37: John Lowe was term-limited.
7. District 39: Lou Ann Linehan was term-limited.
8. District 41: Fred Meyer retired.
9. District 43: Tom Brewer was term-limited.
10. District 47: Steve Erdman was term-limited.

== Predictions ==
Redistricting greatly reduced the number of competitive seats in the state, making it almost certain that the chamber would remain in Republican hands.

=== Statewide ===
Source	Ranking	As of
CNalysis	Solid R	September 2, 2024

=== Competitive districts ===
District	Incumbent	2020 Pres.	CNalysis	Results	#	%
3rd	Carol Blood (retiring)	51.88% R	Tilt R	Incumbent term-limited. Democratic hold.	169	1.14%
5th	Mike McDonnell (retiring)	59.53% D	Very Likely D (flip)	Incumbent term-limited. Democratic gain.	1,665	15.30%
13th	Justin Wayne (retiring)	63.79% D	Solid D	Incumbent term-limited. Democratic hold.	151	1.04%
21st	Beau Ballard	53.58% R	Tossup	Incumbent won re-election. Republican hold.	1,820	10.58%
25th	Carolyn Bosn	51.38% R	Tilt R	Incumbent won re-election. Republican hold.	1,443	6.02%
27th	Anna Wishart	52.62% D	Very Likely D	Incumbent term-limited. Democratic hold.	699	5.10%
31st	Kathleen Kauth	53.07% R	Lean R	Incumbent won re-election. Republican hold.	1,600	8.12%
35th	Ray Aguilar	60.53% R	Very Likely R	Incumbent lost re-election. Democratic gain.	135	1.36%
45th	Rita Sanders	51.15% R	Lean R	Incumbent won re-election. Republican hold.	875	5.74%
49th	Jen Day	54.69% R	Tilt R (flip)	Incumbent lost re-election. Republican gain.	908	4.24%

== Race by district ==
- Note: All elections are technically non-partisan in the State Legislature; therefore, parties listed here are from candidates' websites and official party endorsement lists. Candidates all appear on the ballot as nonpartisan.
  - Candidates endorsed by the Republican Party:
  - Candidates endorsed by the Democratic Party:

=== District 1 ===
The incumbent was Republican Julie Slama, Incumbent retired, Republican hold.

==== Candidates ====
===== Advanced to general =====
- Dennis Schaardt, businessman and former Pawnee County commissioner, mayor, city councilman and volunteer fire chief.
- Robert Hallstrom, lawyer

===== Eliminated in primary =====
- Glenda Willnerd, Librarian

===== Withdrawn =====
- Bob Holman (Note: Holman appears to have withdrawn as his name was removed from the Secretary of State's list of candidates as well as the Nebraska Republican Party's website, he endorsement Dennis Schaardt.)
- Mike Powers (Note: Powers appears to have withdrawn as his name was removed from the Secretary of State's list of candidates as well as the Nebraska Democratic Party's website, and his campaign website and social media pages have disappeared.)
- Julie Slama, lawyer (incumbent)

==== Predictions ====
Source	Ranking	As of
CNalysis	Solid R	September 2, 2024

==== Results ====
Nebraska's 1st Legislative District Election, 2024
Primary election
Party	Candidate	Votes	%
Republican	Dennis Schaardt	3,258	45.13
Republican	Robert Hallstrom	2,439	33.79
Democratic	Glenda Willnerd	1,190	16.48
Republican	Bob Holman (withdrawn)	332	4.60
Total votes		7,219	100.00
General election
Republican	Robert Hallstrom	8,905	51.75
Republican	Dennis Schaardt	8,302	48.25
Total votes		17,207	100.00
Republican hold			

=== District 3 ===
The incumbent was Democratic Carol Blood, Incumbent term-limited, Democratic hold.

==== Candidates ====
===== Advanced to general =====
- Victor Rountree, pastor and former United States Air Force chief master sergeant
- Felix Ungerman, former deputy chief of staff for US Representative Don Bacon

==== Predictions ====
Source	Ranking	As of
CNalysis	Tilt R	September 2, 2024

==== Results ====
Nebraska's 3rd Legislative District Election, 2024
Primary election
Party	Candidate	Votes	%
Republican	Felix Ungerman	2,540	53.10
Democratic	Victor Rountree	2,243	46.90
Total votes		4,783	100.00
General election
Democratic	Victor Rountree	7,494	50.57
Republican	Felix Ungerman	7,325	49.43
Total votes		14,819	100.00
Democratic hold			

=== District 5 ===
The incumbent was Republican Mike McDonnell, Incumbent term limited, Democratic gain.

==== Candidates ====
===== Advanced to general =====
- Gilbert Ayala, unsuccessful candidate in District 5 in 2016 and 2020
- Margo Juarez, member of the Omaha Public Schools Board of Education

===== Eliminated in primary =====
- Flint Harkness, resource teacher for special education

==== Withdrawn ====
- Tim Benak, firefighter and adjunct instructor at the University of Nebraska at Omaha (Note: Benak did not file to run by the March 1 deadline.)

==== Predictions ====
Source	Ranking	As of
CNalysis	Very Likely D (flip)	November 2, 2024

==== Results ====
Nebraska's 5th Legislative District Election, 2024
Primary election
Party	Candidate	Votes	%
Democratic	Margo Juarez	1,337	37.68
Republican	Gilbert Ayala	1,276	35.96
Democratic	Flint Harkness	935	26.35
Total votes		3,548	100.00
General election
Democratic	Margo Juarez	6,275	57.65
Republican	Gilbert Ayala	4,610	42.35
Total votes		10,885	100.00
Democratic gain from Republican			

=== District 7 ===
The incumbent was Democratic Tony Vargas, Incumbent term-limited, Democratic hold.

==== Candidates ====
===== Advanced to general =====
- Dunixi Guereca
- Tim Pendrell, clerk of the Nebraska Retirement Systems Committee in the Nebraska Legislature

===== Eliminated in primary =====
- Christopher Geary, former candidate in the 2010 Nebraska gubernatorial election Republican primary, former candidate for District 7 in 2012 against Jeremy Nordquist, and former candidate in the 2017 Omaha mayoral election.
- Ben Salazar, former lawyer and publisher of the Nuestro Mundo Newspaper

==== Predictions ====
Source	Ranking	As of
CNalysis	Solid D	September 2, 2024

==== Results ====
Nebraska's 7th Legislative District Election, 2024
Primary election
Party	Candidate	Votes	%
Democratic	Dunixi Guereca	758	33.99
Democratic	Tim Pendrell	548	24.57
Independent	Ben Salazar	499	22.38
Democratic	Christopher Geary	425	19.06
Total votes		2,230	100.00
General election
Democratic	Dunixi Guereca	4,497	57.71
Democratic	Tim Pendrell	3,296	42.29
Total votes		7,793	100.00
Democratic hold			

=== District 9 ===
The incumbent was Democratic John Cavanaugh, Incumbent running, Democratic hold.

==== Candidates ====
===== Advanced to general =====
- John Cavanaugh (incumbent)
- Julia Palzer, attorney and former dean of admissions at Creighton University School of Law

==== Predictions ====
Source	Ranking	As of
CNalysis	Solid D	September 2, 2024

==== Results ====
Nebraska's 9th Legislative District Election, 2024
Primary election
Party	Candidate	Votes	%
Democratic	John Cavanaugh (incumbent)	4,041	70.10
Republican	Julia Palzer	1.724	29.90
Total votes		5,765	100.00
General election
Democratic	John Cavanaugh (incumbent)	10,070	70.14
Republican	Julia Palzer	4,287	29.86
Total votes		14,357	100.00
Democratic hold			

=== District 11 ===
The incumbent was Democratic Terrell McKinney, Incumbent running, Democratic hold.

==== Candidates ====
===== Advanced to general =====
- Terrell McKinney (incumbent)

====== Withdrawn, then reenter, Failed to qualify ======
- Ernie Chambers, former member of the Nebraska Legislature from 1971 to 2009 and again from 2013 to 2021

===== Eliminated in primary =====
- Calandra Cooper

==== Predictions ====
Source	Ranking	As of
CNalysis	Solid D	September 2, 2024

==== Results ====
Nebraska's 11th Legislative District Election, 2024
Primary election
Party	Candidate	Votes	%
Democratic	Terrell McKinney (incumbent)	1,351	44.65
Independent	Ernie Chambers	1,347	44.51
Independent	Calandra Cooper	328	10.84
Total votes		3,026	100.00
General election
Democratic	Terrell McKinney (incumbent)	9,025	100.00
Total votes		9,025	100.00

=== District 13 ===
The incumbent was Democratic Justin Wayne, Incumbent term-limited, Democratic hold.

==== Candidates ====
===== Advanced to general =====
- Nick Batter, attorney and corporate counsel for a construction company
- Ashlei Spivey, director of the nonprofit organization I Be Black Girl

===== Eliminated in primary =====
- Matthew Clough, former chief operating officer of the Nebraska Department of Health and Human Services
- Tracy Hightower-Henne, attorney

==== Predictions ====
Source	Ranking	As of
CNalysis	Solid D	September 2, 2024

==== Results ====
Nebraska's 13th Legislative District Election, 2024
Primary election
Party	Candidate	Votes	%
Independent	Nick Batter	2,215	37.88
Democratic	Ashlei Spivey	1,410	24.11
Democratic	Tracy Hightower-Henne	1,369	23.41
Republican	Matthew Clough	853	14.59
Total votes		5,847	100.00
General election
Democratic	Ashlei Spivey	7,307	50.52
Independent	Nick Batter	7,156	49.48
Total votes		14,463	100.00
Democratic hold			

=== District 15 ===
The incumbent was Democratic Lynne Walz, Incumbent term-limited, Republican gain.

==== Candidates ====
===== Advanced to general =====
- Dave "Woody" Wordekemper, firefighter
- Roxie Kracl, former chair of the Dodge County Republican Party

===== Eliminated in primary =====
- Anthony Hanson
- Peter Mayberry,
- Scott Thomas

===== Withdrawn =====
- Chuck Emanuel

==== Predictions ====
Source	Ranking	As of
CNalysis	Solid R (flip)	September 2, 2024

==== Results ====
Nebraska's 15th Legislative District Election, 2024
Primary election
Party	Candidate	Votes	%
Republican	Dave Wordekemper	3,142	43.72
Republican	Roxie Kracl	1,911	25.20
Republican	Anthony Hanson	1,360	18.93
Republican	Scott Thomas	448	6.23
Democratic	Peter Mayberry	131	5.15
Total votes		7,186	100.00
General election
Republican	Dave Wordekemper	9,164	52.72
Republican	Roxie Kracl	8,218	47.28
Total votes		17,382	100.00
Republican gain from Democratic			

=== District 17 ===
2024 Nebraska's 17th Legislature District election
- November 5, 2024
Nominee	Glen Meyer	Mike Albrecht
Party	Republican	Republican
Popular vote	6,042	5,510
Percentage	52.3%	47.7%
- County results Meyer: 60–70% Albrecht: 50–60%
Senator before election
Joni Albrecht
Republican
Elected Senator
Glen Meyer
Republican

The incumbent was Republican Joni Albrecht, Incumbent term-limited, Republican hold.

==== Candidates ====
===== Advanced to general =====
- Mike Albrecht
- Glen Meyer, farmer and chairman of the Thurston County, Nebraska, Board

===== Eliminated in primary =====
- Cindy Kai

==== Predictions ====
Source	Ranking	As of
CNalysis	Solid R	September 2, 2024

==== Results ====
Nebraska's 17th Legislative District Election, 2024
Primary election
Party	Candidate	Votes	%
Republican	Mike Albrecht	1,674	40.67
Republican	Glen Meyer	1,328	32.26
Democratic	Cindy Kai	1,114	27.07
Total votes			100.00
General election
Republican	Glen Meyer	6,042	52.30
Republican	Mike Albrecht	5,510	47.70
Total votes		11,552	100.00
Republican hold			

=== District 19 ===
==== Candidates ====
The incumbent was Republican Rob Dover, Incumbent running, Republican hold.

===== Advanced to general =====
- Rob Dover, real estate developer (incumbent, appointed by Governor Pete Ricketts)
- Jeanne Reigle, agriculture producer and former member of the Northeast Community College Board of Governors

===== Eliminated in primary =====
- Melissa Temple, former teacher and member of the Lower Elkhorn Natural Resources District

==== Predictions ====
Source	Ranking	As of
CNalysis	Solid R	September 2, 2024

==== Results ====
Nebraska's 19th Legislative District Election, 2024
Primary election
Party	Candidate	Votes	%
Republican	Jeanne Reigle	3,071	38.85
Republican	Rob Dover (incumbent)	2,878	36.41
Democratic	Melissa Temple	1,956	24.74
Total votes		7,905	100.00
General election
Republican	Rob Dover (incumbent)	8,992	54.57
Republican	Jeanne Reigle	7,485	45.43
Total votes		16,477	100.00
Republican hold			

=== District 21 ===
The incumbent was Republican Beau Ballard, Incumbent term-limited, Republican hold.

==== Candidates ====
===== Advanced to general =====
- Beau Ballard, business owner (incumbent, appointed by Governor Pete Ricketts)
- Seth Derner, business owner

===== Eliminated in primary =====
- Bryan Paseka

==== Predictions ====
Source	Ranking	As of
CNalysis	Tossup	November 2, 2024

==== Results ====
Nebraska's 21st Legislative District Election, 2024
Primary election
Party	Candidate	Votes	%
Republican	Beau Ballard (incumbent)	3,829	54.30
Democratic	Seth Derner	2,136	30.29
Democratic	Bryan Paseka	1,087	15.41
Total votes		7,052	100.00
General election
Republican	Beau Ballard (incumbent)	9,509	55.29
Democratic	Seth Derner	7,689	44.71
Total votes		17,198	100.00
Republican hold			

=== District 23 ===
The incumbent was Republican Bruce Bostelman, Incumbent term-limited, Republican hold.

==== Candidates ====
===== Advanced to general =====
- Dennis Fujan, farmer
- Jared Storm, small-business owner and pilot

===== Eliminated in primary =====
- Allie French, small-business owner and founder of Nebraskans Against Government Overreach
- Larissa Schultz, nonprofit worker from Yutan, Nebraska
- Jacob Wolff, navy veteran
- Alan Zavodny, former mayor of David City, Nebraska

==== Endorsements ====
Jacob Wolff

Individuals

- Charlie Janssen, former Nebraska State Auditor and former Nebraska state senator from District 15
- Shane Osborn, former Nebraska State Treasurer
Alan Zavodny

Individuals

- Deb Fischer, U.S. senator from Nebraska

==== Predictions ====
Source	Ranking	As of
CNalysis	Solid R	September 2, 2024

==== Results ====
Nebraska's 23rd Legislative District Election, 2024
Primary election
Party	Candidate	Votes	%
Republican	Jared Storm	2,460	34.85
Republican	Dennis Fujan	1,738	24.62
Republican	Allie French	1,006	14.25
Democratic	Larissa Schultz	878	12.88
Republican	Alan Zavodny	557	7.89
Republican	Jacob Wolff	420	5.95
Total votes		7,059	100.00
General election
Republican	Jared Storm	9,569	54.86
Republican	Dennis Fujan	7,873	45.14
Total votes		17,442	100.00
Republican hold			

=== District 25 ===
The incumbent was Republican Carolyn Bosn, Incumbent running, Republican hold.

==== Candidates ====
===== Advanced to general =====
- Carolyn Bosn, attorney (incumbent, appointed by Governor Jim Pillen)
- Nicki Behmer Popp, realtor and member of the Lincoln Airport Authority

===== Eliminated in primary =====
- Aurang Zeb, former unsuccessful candidate for city council in Lincoln, Nebraska

==== Predictions ====
Source	Ranking	As of
CNalysis	Tilt R	November 2, 2024

==== Results ====
Nebraska's 25th Legislative District Election, 2024
Primary election
Party	Candidate	Votes	%
Republican	Carolyn Bosn (incumbent)	5,968	55.35
Independent Democrat	Nicki Behmer Popp	4,500	41.73
Democratic	Aurang Zeb	315	2.92
Total votes		10,783	100.00
General election
Republican	Carolyn Bosn (incumbent)	12,707	53.01
Independent Democratic	Nicki Behmer Popp	11,264	46.99
Total votes		23,971	100.00
Republican hold			

=== District 27 ===
The incumbent was Democratic Anna Wishart, Incumbent term-limited, Democratic hold.

==== Candidates ====
===== Advanced to general =====
- Dawn Liphardt
- Jason Prokop, director of First Five Nebraska

===== Withdrawn =====
- Kameron Neeman, community organizer and activist, board member for Nebraska Abortion Resources and OutNebraska

==== Endorsements ====
Jason Prokop

Individuals

- Anna Wishart, current Nebraska state senator from District 27

==== Predictions ====
Source	Ranking	As of
CNalysis	Very Likely D	September 2, 2024

==== Results ====
Nebraska's 27th Legislative District Election, 2024
Primary election
Party	Candidate	Votes	%
Democratic	Jason Prokop	2,756	56.33
Republican	Dawn Liphardt	2,137	43.67
Total votes		4,893	100.00
General election
Democratic	Jason Prokop	7,201	52.55
Republican	Dawn Liphardt	6,502	47.45
Total votes		13,703	100.00
Democratic hold			

=== District 29 ===
The incumbent was Democratic Eliot Bostar, Incumbent term-limited, Democratic hold.

==== Candidates ====
===== Advanced to general =====
- Eliot Bostar (incumbent), nonprofit executive

===== Withdrawn =====
- Phil Bruce, former cybersecurity analyst and nonprofit founder

==== Predictions ====
Source	Ranking	As of
CNalysis	Solid D	September 2, 2024

==== Results ====
Nebraska's 29th Legislative District Election, 2024
Primary election
Party	Candidate	Votes	%
Democratic	Eliot Bostar (incumbent)	6,766	100.00
Total votes		6,766	100.00
General election
Democratic	Eliot Bostar (incumbent)	14,048	100.00
Total votes		14,048	100.00
Democratic hold			

=== District 31 ===
The incumbent was Republican Kathleen Kauth, Incumbent running, Republican hold.

==== Candidates ====
===== Advanced to general =====
- Mary Ann Folchert
- Kathleen Kauth (incumbent)

===== Withdrawn =====
- Jessie McGrath

==== Predictions ====
Source	Ranking	As of
CNalysis	Toss up	November 2, 2024

==== Results ====
Nebraska's 31st Legislative District Election, 2024
Primary election
Party	Candidate	Votes	%
Republican	Kathleen Kauth (incumbent)	4,680	59.13
Democratic	Mary Ann Folchert	3,235	40.87
Total votes		7,915	100.00
General election
Republican	Kathleen Kauth (incumbent)	10,664	54.06
Democratic	Mary Ann Folchert	9,064	45.94
Total votes		19,728	100.00
Republican hold			

=== District 33 ===
The incumbent was Republican Steve Halloran, Incumbent term-limited, Republican hold.

==== Candidates ====
===== Advanced to general =====
- Dan Lonowski, small business owner, retired public school teacher, and veteran
- Michelle Smith, business owner and therapist

===== Eliminated in primary =====
- Joshua Frederick, architectural designer, project manager, and veteran
- Paul Hamelink, small business owner and former member of the city council of Hastings, Nebraska

Source	Ranking	As of
CNalysis	Solid R	September 2, 2024

==== Results ====
Nebraska's 33rd Legislative District Election, 2024
Primary election
Party	Candidate	Votes	%
Republican	Dan Lonowski	3,475	39.92
Democratic	Michelle Smith	2,516	28.90
Republican	Paul Hamelink	1,595	18.32
Republican	Joshua Frederick	1,120	12.86
Total votes		8,706	100.00
General election
Republican	Dan Lonowski	11,875	67.31
Democratic	Michelle Smith	5,767	32.69
Total votes		17,642	100.00
Republican hold			

=== District 35 ===
2024 Nebraska's 35th Legislature District election
- November 5, 2024
Nominee	Dan Quick	Ray Aguilar
Party	Democratic	Republican
Popular vote	4,997	4,862
Percentage	50.7%	49.3%
- Results by precinct Quick: 50–60% Aguilar: 50–60%
Senator before election
Ray Aguilar
Republican
Elected Senator
Dan Quick
Democratic

The incumbent was Republican Ray Aguilar, Incumbent running, Democratic gain.

==== Candidates ====
===== Advanced to general =====
- Ray Aguilar (incumbent)
- Dan Quick, former state senator from 2016 to 2020

==== Predictions ====
Source	Ranking	As of
CNalysis	Very Likely R	September 2, 2024

==== Results ====
Nebraska's 35th Legislative District Election, 2024
Primary election
Party	Candidate	Votes	%
Democratic	Dan Quick	1,673	51.41
Republican	Ray Aguilar (incumbent)	1,581	48.59
Total votes		3,254	100.00
General election
Democratic	Dan Quick	4,997	50.68
Republican	Ray Aguilar (incumbent)	4,862	49.32
Total votes		9,859	100.00
Democratic gain from Republican			

=== District 37 ===
The incumbent was Republican John Lowe, Incumbent term-limited, Republican hold.

==== Candidates ====
===== Advanced to general =====
- Stan Clouse, mayor of Kearney, Nebraska
- Lana Peister, registered nurse and small-business partner

===== Eliminated in primary =====
- Nathan Leach, founder of Nonpartisan Nebraska

==== Endorsements ====
Stan Clouse

Individuals

- Galen Hadley, former Speaker of the Nebraska Legislature and senator from District 37

==== Predictions ====
Source	Ranking	As of
CNalysis	Solid R	September 2, 2024

==== Results ====
Nebraska's 37th Legislative District Election, 2024
Primary election
Party	Candidate	Votes	%
Republican	Stan Clouse	3,759	57.72
Republican	Lana Peister	2,129	32.69
Independent	Nathan Leach	625	9.60
Total votes		6,513	100.00
General election
Republican	Stan Clouse	9,776	58.77
Republican	Lana Peister	6,859	41.23
Total votes		16,635	100.00
Republican hold			

=== District 39 ===
The incumbent was Republican Lou Ann Linehan, Incumbent term-limited, Republican hold.

==== Candidates ====
===== Advanced to general =====
- Allison Heimes, attorney and candidate for District 39 in 2020
- Tony Sorrentino, president and founder of Health Plan Fiduciary Compliance, a firm that advises health plans on complying with federal law; adjunct law professor at Creighton University; and unsuccessful candidate for Nebraska Legislature in 2006 in District 4

==== Predictions ====
Source	Ranking	As of
CNalysis	Very Likely R	November 2, 2024

==== Results ====
Nebraska's 39th Legislative District Election, 2024
Primary election
Party	Candidate	Votes	%
Republican	Tony Sorrentino	3,881	51.11
Independent Democrat	Allison Heimes	3,712	48.89
Total votes		7,593	100.00
General election
Republican	Tony Sorrentino	11,847	52.09
Independent Democrat	Allison Heimes	10,896	47.91
Total votes		22,743	100.00
Republican hold			

=== District 41 ===
The incumbent was Republican Fred Meyer, Incumbent term-limited, Republican hold.

==== Candidates ====
===== Advanced to general =====
- Dan McKeon, agronomy consultant from Amherst, Nebraska
- Ethan Clark, agriculture marketing professional from Ord, Nebraska

===== Eliminated in primary =====
- Nadine Bane, vice chair of the Greeley County Republican Party

==== Predictions ====
Source	Ranking	As of
CNalysis	Solid R	September 2, 2024

==== Results ====
Nebraska's 41st Legislative District Election, 2024
Primary election
Party	Candidate	Votes	%
Republican	Dan McKeon	3,316	44.84
Republican	Ethan Clark	2,926	39.56
Republican	Nadine Bane	1,154	15.60
Total votes		7,396	100.00
General election
Republican	Dan McKeon	9,311	52.04
Republican	Ethan Clark	8,581	47.96
Total votes		22,743	100.00
Republican hold			

=== District 43 ===
2024 Nebraska's 43rd Legislature District election
- November 5, 2024
Nominee	Tanya Storer	Tony Tangwall
Party	Republican	Republican
Popular vote	11,519	7,453
Percentage	60.7%	39.3%
- County results Storer: 50–60% 60–70% 70–80%
Senator before election
Tom Brewer
Republican
Elected Senator
Tanya Storer
Republican

The incumbent was Republican Tom Brewer, Incumbent term-limited, Republican hold.

==== Candidates ====
===== Advanced to general =====
- Tanya Storer, cattle rancher, former Cherry County commissioner, and unsuccessful candidate for Nebraska Legislature in 2020
- Tony Tangwall, Dawes County Republican Party leadership

==== Endorsements ====
Tanya Storer

Individuals

- Deb Fischer, US Senator from Nebraska
- Mike Flood, US Representative from Nebraska's 1st congressional district
- Mike Jacobson, current Nebraska state senator from District 42
- Pete Ricketts, US Senator from Nebraska

==== Predictions ====
Source	Ranking	As of
CNalysis	Solid R	September 2, 2024

==== Results ====
Nebraska's 43rd Legislative District Election, 2024
Primary election
Party	Candidate	Votes	%
Republican	Tanya Storer	5,809	58.52
Republican	Tony Tangwall	4,112	41.48
Total votes		9,926	100.00
General election
Republican	Tanya Storer	11,519	60.72
Republican	Tony Tangwall	7,453	39.28
Total votes		18,972	100.00
Republican hold			

=== District 45 ===
The incumbent was Republican Rita Sanders, Incumbent running, Republican hold.

==== Candidates ====
===== Advanced to general =====
- Sarah Centineo
- Rita Sanders (incumbent)

==== Withdrawn ====
- Elcireyna Warnell (Note: Previously listed on the website for the Nebraska Democratic Party as running for the Nebraska Legislature in District 45 but is now listed as running for the Bellevue, Nebraska school board.)

==== Predictions ====
Source	Ranking	As of
CNalysis	Lean R	September 2, 2024

==== Results ====
Nebraska's 45th Legislative District Election, 2024
Primary election
Party	Candidate	Votes	%
Republican	Rita Sanders (incumbent)	3,014	58.56
Democratic	Sarah Centineo	2,133	41.44
Total votes		5,147	100.00
General election
Republican	Rita Sanders (incumbent)	8,062	52.87
Democratic	Sarah Centineo	7,187	47.13
Total votes		15,249	100.00
Republican hold			

=== District 47 ===
2024 Nebraska's 47th Legislature District election
- November 5, 2024
Nominee	Paul Strommen	Larry Bolinger
Party	Republican	Democratic
Popular vote	12,253	3,630
Percentage	77.2%	22.8%
- County results Strommen: 70–80% 80–90% >90%
Senator before election
Steve Erdman
Republican
Elected Senator
Paul Strommen
Republican

The incumbent was Republican Steve Erdman, Incumbent term-limited, Republican hold.

==== Candidates ====
===== Advanced to general =====
- Larry Bolinger, former Republican candidate for United States House of Representatives in 2018 and 2020 and Nebraska Attorney General in 2022 with the Legal Marijuana Now Party
- Paul Strommen, deputy mayor and member of the city council of Sidney, Nebraska, and commissioner on the Nebraska Oil and Gas Conservation Commission

==== Predictions ====
Source	Ranking	As of
CNalysis	Solid R	September 2, 2024

==== Results ====
Nebraska's 47th Legislative District Election, 2024
Primary election
Party	Candidate	Votes	%
Republican	Paul Strommen	5,662	77.11
Democratic	Larry Bolinger	1,681	22.89
Total votes		7,343	100.00
General election
Republican	Paul Strommen	12,253	77.15
Democratic	Larry Bolinger	3,630	22.85
Total votes		15,883	100.00
Republican hold			

=== District 49 ===
2024 Nebraska's 49th Legislature District election
- November 5, 2024
Nominee	Bob Andersen	Jen Day
Party	Republican	Democratic
Popular vote	11,155	10,247
Percentage	52.1%	47.9%
- Precinct results Andersen: 50–60% 60–70% Day: 40–50% 50–60%
Senator before election
Jen Day
Democratic
Elected Senator
Bob Andersen
Republican

The incumbent was Democratic Jen Day, Incumbent running, Republican gain.

==== Declared ====
- Bob Andersen, retired Air Force veteran and small-business owner
- Jen Day (incumbent)

==== Eliminated in primary ====
- Caleb Muhs, financial consultant and former FBI counterterrorism analyst

==== Predictions ====
Source	Ranking	As of
CNalysis	Lean R (flip)	September 2, 2024

==== Results ====
Nebraska's 49th Legislative District Election, 2024
Primary election
Party	Candidate	Votes	%
Democratic	Jen Day (incumbent)	2,264	42.85
Republican	Bob Andersen	1,835	34.73
Republican	Caleb Muhs	1,184	22.41
Total votes		5,283	100.00
General election
Republican	Bob Andersen	11,155	52.12
Democratic	Jen Day (incumbent)	10,247	47.88
Total votes		21,402	100.00
Republican gain from Democratic			
