= Nebraska Legislature 37th district =

American legislative district

Nebraska's 37th legislative district
- Map of Nebraska Legislature districts with the 37th district shaded in red
Senator
Stan Clouse; R–Kearney
since 2025
- Demographics: 84.6% White; 1.5% Black; 11.7% Hispanic; 1.6% Asian; 0.6% Native American
- Population (2020): 40,552

The Nebraska Legislature's 37th district is one of the 49 legislative districts in the Nebraska Legislature. The district is located in south-central Nebraska and covers southeastern Buffalo County. The main population center is Kearney. It also includes Gibbon and Shelton, following US Route 30 east. Stan Clouse has represented the district since 2025.

== Demographics ==
The US Census Bureau recorded the population as of 2020 at 40,552.

- 59% of the district is White.
- 11.7% of the district is Hispanic.
- 1.6% of the district is Asian.
- 1.5% of the district is Black.
- 0.6% of the district is Native American.

== List of representatives ==
Representative	Party	Years of service	Legislature	Residence
Stan Clouse	Republican	2025–present	109th	Kearney
John Lowe	Republican	2017–2025	105th-108th	Kearney
Galen Hadley	Republican	2009–2017	102nd-104th	Kearney
Joel T. Johnson	Republican	2002–2009	98th-101st	Kearney
Doug Kristensen	Republican	1989–2002*	91st-97th	Minden
Jerry D. Miller	Democratic	1984–1989	88th-90th	Davenport
Martin Kahle	Democratic	1977–1984*	85th-88th	Kearney
Gary Anderson	Democratic	1973–1977	83rd-84th	Axtell
Gary Anderson	Republican	1973*	83rd	Axtell
Wayne Ziebarth	Republican	1969-1973	80th-82nd	Wilcox
Richard Ely	Republican	1967–1969	77th-79th	Guide Rock
Kenneth Bowen	Republican	1965–1967*	75th-77th	Red Cloud

- Kenneth Bowen resigned before his term ended. Richard Ely was appointed to fill the vacancy.
- Martin Kahle died while in office. Jerry D. Miller was appointed to fill the vacancy.
- Doug Kristensen resigned before his term ended. Joel T. Johnson was appointed to fill the vacancy.
- Gary Anderson was elected as a Republican, but changed his affiliation from the Republican to the Democratic Party in September 1973, citing the Republican Party's adherence to partisan politics.
