= Nebraska Legislature 47th district =

American legislative district

Nebraska's 47th legislative district
- Map of Nebraska Legislature districts with the 47th district shaded in red
Senator
Paul Strommen; R–Sidney
since 2025
- Demographics: 88.2% White; 0.4% Black; 9.3% Hispanic; 0.6% Asian; 1.3% Native American
- Population (2020): 39,092

The Nebraska Legislature's 47th district is one of the 49 legislative districts in the Nebraska Legislature. The district is located in western Nebraska and covers Arthur, Box Butte, Cheyenne, Deuel, Garden, Grant, Keith, Morrill and Sioux counties. Notable settlements in the area include Sidney, Alliance, Ogallala, Bridgeport, and Bayard. Paul Strommen has represented the district since 2025.

== Demographics ==
The US Census Bureau recorded the population as of 2020 at 39,092.

- 88.2% of the district is White.
- 1.3% of the district is Native American.
- 9.3% of the district is Hispanic.
- 0.6% of the district is Asian.
- 0.4% of the district is Black.

== List of representatives ==
Representative	Party	Years of service	Legislature	Residence
Paul Strommen	Republican	2025 - present	109th	Sidney
Steve Erdman	Republican	2017-2025	105th-108th	Bayard
Ken Schilz	Republican	2009-2017	101st-104th	Ogallala
