= Nebraska Legislature 49th district =

American legislative district

Nebraska's 49th legislative district
- Map of Nebraska Legislature districts with the 49th district shaded in red
Senator
Bob Andersen; R–Omaha
since 2025
- Demographics: 86.2% White; 1.8% Black; 6.2% Hispanic; 2.9% Asian; 0.2% Native American
- Population (2020): 38,542

The Nebraska Legislature's 49th district is one of the 49 legislative districts in the Nebraska Legislature. The district is located in eastern Nebraska and covers part of north-central Sarpy County. The area of Sarpy County it covers includes sections of Papillion and La Vista as well as surrounding unincorporated suburbs. Bob Andersen has represented the district since 2025.

== Demographics ==
The US Census Bureau recorded the population as of 2020 at 38,542.

- 86.2% of the district is White.
- 6.2% of the district is Hispanic.
- 1.8% of the district is Black.
- 2.9% of the district is Asian.
- 0.2% of the district is Native American.

== List of senators ==
Senator	Party	Years of service	Legislature	Residence
Bob Andersen	Republican	2025 - present	109th	Omaha
Jen Day	Democratic	2021-2025	107th-108th	Gretna
Andrew La Grone	Republican	2019-2021	106th	Gretna
John Murante	Republican	2013-2019	103rd-105th	Gretna
LeRoy Louden	Republican	2003-2012	98th-102nd	Ellsworth
Fred Hlava	Republican	2002	97th	Gordon
Bob Wickersham	Democratic	1991-2002*	92nd-97th	Harrison
Sandra K. Scofield	Democratic	1983-1990*	88th-92nd	Chadron
Samuel Cullan	Republican	1977-1983*	85th-88th	Hemingford
Leslie Stull	Republican	1969-1977	80th-84th	Alliance

- Bob Wickersham resigned before his term ended. Fred Hlava was appointed to fill the vacancy.
- Sandra Scofield resigned before her term ended. William Wickersham was appointed to fill the vacancy.
- Samuel Cullan resigned before his term ended. Sandra Scofield was appointed to fill the vacancy.
