= Robert Dover =

Robert Dover may refer to:

- Robert Dover (Cotswold Games) (1575/82–1652), English captain and attorney; founder of the Cotswold Olimpick Games
- Robert Dover (equestrian) (born 1956), American Olympic horse rider
- Rob Dover (born 1958), member of the Nebraska Legislature from the 19th District
