= Tony Sorrentino =

Tony Sorrentino may refer to:

- Tony Sorrentino (politician)
- Tony Sorrentino (American football)
