= Senator Storm =

Senator Storm may refer to:

- Brandon J. Storm (born 1976), Kentucky State Senate
- Jared Storm (born 1971), Nebraska State Senate

== See also ==
- Ronda Storms (born 1965), Florida State Senate
