= Nebraska Legislature 1st district =

American legislative district

Nebraska's 1st legislative district
- Map of Nebraska Legislature districts with the 1st district shaded in red
Senator
Robert Hallstrom; R–Syracuse
since 2025
- Demographics: 89.3% White; 1.2% Black; 5.9% Hispanic; 0.6% Asian; 1% Native American
- Population (2020): 38,691

The Nebraska Legislature's 1st district is one of the 49 legislative districts in the Nebraska Legislature. The district is located in southeastern Nebraska and covers Johnson, Nemaha, Otoe, Pawnee, and Richardson counties. Notable settlements in the area include Nebraska City, Pawnee City, Auburn, Falls City, and Tecumseh. Robert Hallstrom has represented the district since 2025.

== Demographics ==
The US Census Bureau recorded the population as of 2020 at 38,691.

- 89.3% of the district is White.
- 5.9% of the district is Hispanic.
- 1.2% of the district is Black.
- 1% of the district is Native American.
- 0.6% of the district is Asian.

== List of senators ==
Senator	Party	Years of service	Legislature	Residence
Robert Hallstrom	Republican	2025 - present	109th	Syracuse
Julie Slama	Republican	2019-2025	106th-108th	Peru
Dan Watermeier	Republican	2013-2019	103rd-105th	Syracuse
Lavon Heidemann	Republican	2005-2013	99th-102nd	Elk Creek
Floyd Vrtiska	Republican	1993-2005	93rd-98th	Table Rock
Spencer Morrissey	Democratic	1989-1993	91st-92nd	Tecumseh
