= Nebraska Legislature 43rd district =

American legislative district

Nebraska's 43rd legislative district
- Map of Nebraska Legislature districts with the 43rd district shaded in red
Senator
Tanya Storer; R–Whitman
since 2025
- Demographics: 90% White; 0.6% Black; 3.5% Hispanic; 0.3% Asian; 3.2% Native American
- Population (2020): 38,921

The Nebraska Legislature's 43rd district is one of the 49 legislative districts in the Nebraska Legislature. The district is located in north-central Nebraska and covers Dawes, Sheridan, Cherry, Keya Paha, Boyd, Brown, Rock, Blaine, Loup, Garfield, and Custer counties. Notable settlements in the area include Chadron, Valentine, Ainsworth, and Broken Bow. Tanya Storer has represented the district since 2025.

== Demographics ==
The US Census Bureau recorded the population as of 2020 at 30,476.

- 90% of the district is White.
- 3.5% of the district is Hispanic.
- 3.2% of the district is Native American.
- 0.6% of the district is Black.
- 0.3% of the district is Asian.

== List of representatives ==
Representative	Party	Years of service	Legislature	Residence
Tanya Storer	Republican	2025 - present	109th	Whitman
Tom Brewer	Republican	2017-2024	105th-108th	Gordon
Al Davis	Republican	2013-2016	103rd-104th	Hyannis
