= Kathleen Kauth =

Kathleen Kauth may refer to:

- Kathleen Kauth (ice hockey)
- Kathleen Kauth (politician)
