= Colby Coash =

American politician

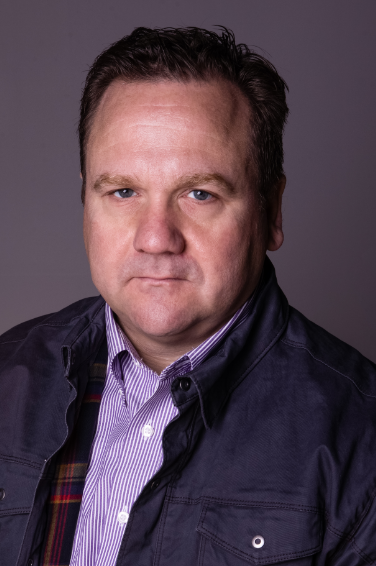

Member of the Nebraska Legislature from the 27th district
- In office 2009–2017
- Preceded by: DiAnna Schimek
- Succeeded by: Anna Wishart

Personal details
- Born: October 29, 1975 (age 50) Bassett, Nebraska, U.S.
- Party: Republican

Colby Coash (born October 29, 1975, in Bassett, Nebraska) is a former Nebraska state senator from Lincoln, Nebraska, United States. He was a member of the Nebraska Legislature from 2009 to 2017.

== Nebraska Legislature ==
Coash was elected in 2008 to represent the 27th Nebraska legislative district by just 79 votes, becoming the first Republican to hold the seat since 1972. He was known to ride a Razor scooter while campaigning door-to-door.

While in office, he focused on issues including child welfare, elder care, support for those with developmental disabilities, and corrections reform. He served as chairman of the Developmental Disabilities Special Investigative Committee commissioned by Senator Mike Flood's Legislative Resolution 283 (2008) to further investigate civil rights violations previously identified at the Beatrice State Developmental Center by the federal Department of Justice.

=== Death penalty ===
As a state senator, Coash was also a notable proponent of legislation to end the death penalty in Nebraska. He also collaborated with policymakers engaged in similar efforts in other states. His reform efforts led to appearances on The Daily Show and National Public Radio's Here & Now.

In an interview published by the Washington Post, Coash described attending a September 3, 1994 rally outside of the Nebraska State Penitentiary in the hours before the execution of Willie Otey. A college freshman at the time, Coash said that "It was pretty ugly... It kind of changed my heart. I thought, 'I don't want to be a part of state-sponsored killing.'"

Coash argued that his position on abolishing the death penalty was compatible with a conservative political philosophy. "If any other program was as inefficient and as costly as this has been, we would've gotten rid of it a long time ago." "Some people see this as a pro-life issue. Other people see it as a good-government issue. But the support that this bill is getting from conservative members is evidence that you can get justice through eliminating the death penalty, and you can get efficient government through eliminating the death penalty."

In an interview with Playboy magazine, Coash said, "This is the same government we don't trust to deliver the mail or roll out a health care website." The magazine editorialized that the 2015 passage of legislation to end the death penalty Nebraska "would have been impossible without Coash's efforts to rally his conservative peers and convince seven freshmen Republicans of the penalty's inherently anticonservative nature."

== Acting career ==
Coash is an actor with nearly two dozen acting credits. He participated in theater as a college student, including a controversial production of "Six Degrees of Separation" in which he played the role of "the Hustler" and was required to appear nude on stage. He is credited as executive producer for I Am a Man, a planned biopic telling the story of Chief Standing Bear, a Native American civil rights icon from Nebraska.

== Memoir ==
In April 2024, Cahoy & Crook published Coash's memoir, Running Naked: Surviving the Legacy of Family in Rural Nebraska. In the book, Coash describes a sense of inevitable destiny that many rural young people face and the tension they experience, feeling needed at home on the farm but also feeling called to careers and opportunities that takes them away to urban areas instead. "Children carry on by following in the footsteps of the generations before them. A small community’s balance always depends on the next generation’s embrace of such a duty and responsibility." He credits his farm-life work ethic with making the difference in his narrow election win in 2008.
