= Ashlei Spivey =

Nebraskan state senator

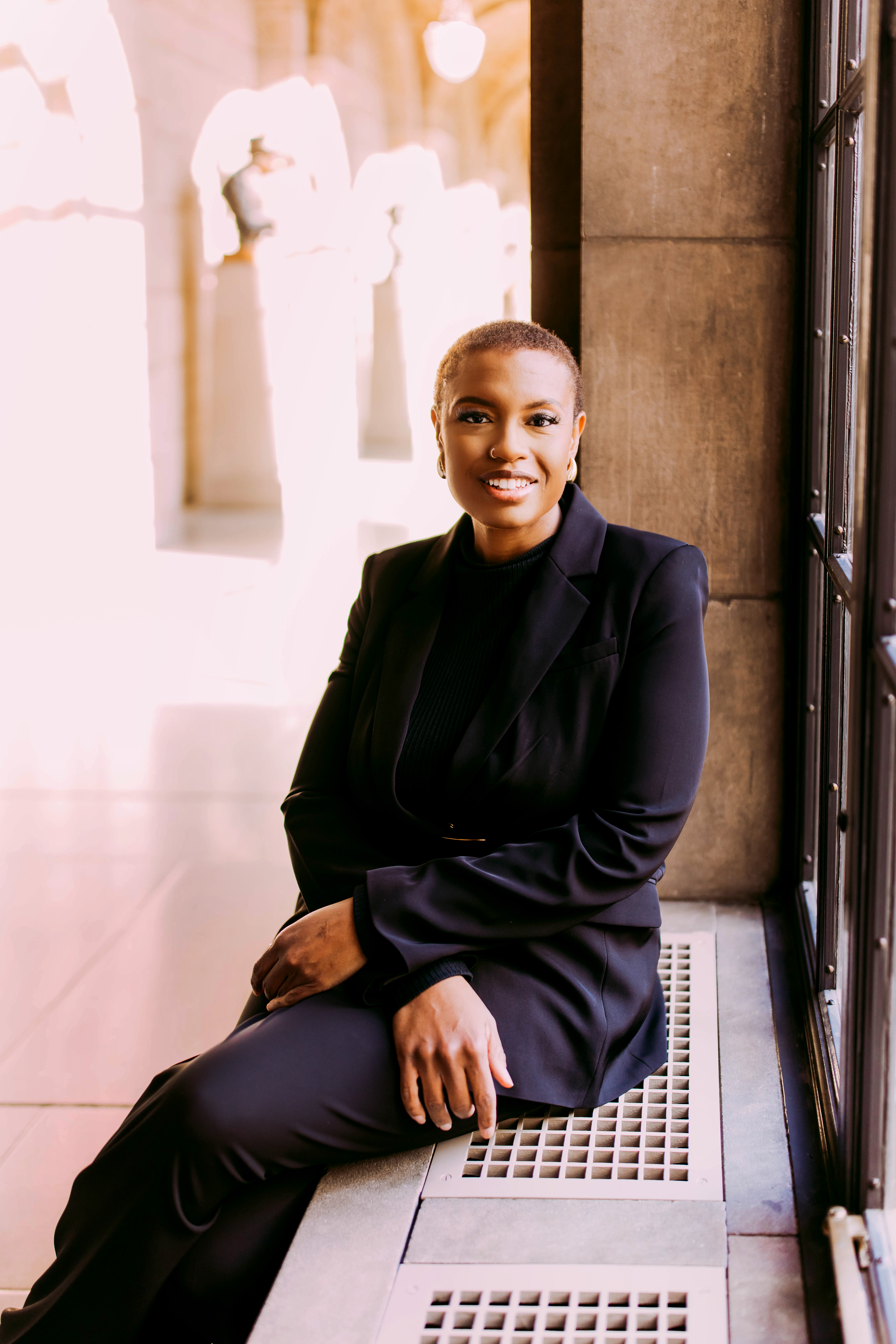

Member of the Nebraska Legislature from the 13th district
- Incumbent
- Assumed office January 8, 2025
- Preceded by: Justin Wayne

Personal details
- Born: August 15, 1986 (age 40) Omaha, Nebraska
- Party: Democratic
- Spouse: Universal Arthur
- Children: 2
- Education: Jackson State University; University of Texas at Arlington

Ashlei Spivey (born August 15, 1986) is an American politician from Omaha, Nebraska serving as a member of the Nebraska Legislature. Spivey represents the 13th congressional district, covering most of North Omaha and northeast Douglas County. She succeeded term limited Justin Wayne.

Spivey was the first black woman to be elected to the Nebraska Legislature since 2017. Spivey's committee assignments currently include Appropriations, State-Tribal Relations, Economic Recovery, and the Committee on Committees.

== Early life and education ==
Spivey is originally from Omaha, Nebraska, and is a lifelong resident of the district she currently represents.

Spivey received a bachelors degree in communications and marketing from Jackson State University in Mississippi and later attended the University of Texas, Arlington for graduate studies in urban social planning.

== Work ==
Spivey founded the Omaha-based nonprofit I Be Black Girl, which focuses on maternal and child health.
