= Carolyn Bosn =

American politician

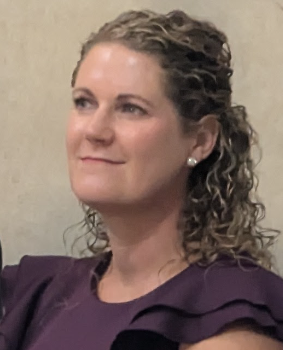

Member of the Nebraska Legislature from the 25th district
- Incumbent
- Assumed office April 11, 2023
- Appointed by: Jim Pillen
- Preceded by: Suzanne Geist

Personal details
- Born: Carolyn Heide Curry; October 5, 1982 (age 43) Columbus, Nebraska, U.S.
- Party: Republican
- Spouse: Reggie Bosn
- Children: 4
- Education: Baylor University; Creighton University
- Occupation: Attorney

Carolyn Heide Bosn (née Curry; born October 5, 1982) is a member of the Nebraska Legislature for District 25.

== Personal life ==
Bosn was born in Columbus, Nebraska and graduated from Columbus High School in 2001. She earned a Bachelor of Science degree from Baylor University and a Juris Doctor from Creighton University School of Law.

From 2010 to 2017, Bosn worked in the Lancaster County Attorney's office, including service as the deputy county attorney. She also serves as an adjunct professor for the University of Nebraska College of Law and coaches its trial team.

On top of working for the Nebraska Legislature, Bosn has also listed her occupation as an “attorney, stay-at-home-mom, and business owner.”

Bosn is married with four children. She is a member of St. Joseph’s Catholic Church in Lincoln, Nebraska and the Supreme Court Commission on Children in the Courts.

== Nebraska State Legislature ==
Bosn was appointed by Governor Jim Pillen in April 2023 to fill the seat of former Senator Suzanne Geist who resigned in order to run for mayor of Lincoln, Nebraska.

As of 2025, Carolyn Bosn serves as the Chairperson on the Judiciary Committee, a member on the Transportation and Telecommunication committee, and member on the Legislative Oversight Committee and Committee on Committees. Bosn also serves on the Justice Reinvestment Oversight Committee created by Legislative Bill 605 and current statute 50-434.

District 25 of Nebraska's Legislative District includes the southwest portion of Lincoln, Nebraska and the town of Bennet, Nebraska.

=== LGBTQA+ ===
Bosn is against gender affirming care for trans minors. She is also against trans students playing in boy/girls sports that do not match with gender assigned at birth

=== Abortion Rights ===
Bosn is pro-life and against abortion.

=== Gambling ===
Bosn is for sports betting online.

=== Marijuana ===
Bosn is against recreational marijuana.

=== School Choice and Education ===
Bosn is for more school choice for parents. She also mentioned support for more education funding, including paying educators fairly, but has offered few details on how to achieve either.

=== Crime ===
Bosn supports problem-solving courts. These courts are specialized in particular fields of crime (such as drug offenses and domestic violence) and seek alternative methods of helping the accused through programs instead of more jail and prison time. Problem-Solving courts take the accused history into account when weighing a treatment plan or prison time as not to put public safety at risk. Bosn has claimed that problem-solving courts are “less costly for taxpayers” and help those accused from relapsing into criminal activity, which has been verified through the Public Policy Center at the University of Nebraska.

Bosn also believes Nebraska needs to “incentivize incarcerated individuals to get an education and work towards a career when they are re-entering the community. Their careers help our workforce shortages, contribute time and talent to their communities and families, and most importantly, reduce recidivism.”

=== Taxes ===
Bosn supports homestead tax exemptions and expanding them to help keep taxes low.

=== Housing ===
Bosn supports reducing unnecessary regulations and ordinances and streamlining codes to make the home building process quicker for contractors and investors.
