= Margo Juarez =

Nebraskan state senator

Margo R. Juarez

Member of the Nebraska Legislature from the 5th district
- Incumbent
- Assumed office January 8, 2025
- Preceded by: Mike McDonnell

Personal details
- Born: April 30, 1958 (age 67) Omaha, Nebraska
- Party: Democratic
- Children: 2

Margo R. Juarez (born April 30, 1958) is an American politician from Omaha, Nebraska, who has served in the Nebraska Legislature representing the 5th district since 2025.

== Personal life ==
Juarez was born on April 30, 1958 in Omaha, Nebraska, and attended Omaha South High, graduating from there in 1976. She has two children.
