= Joni Albrecht =

American politician

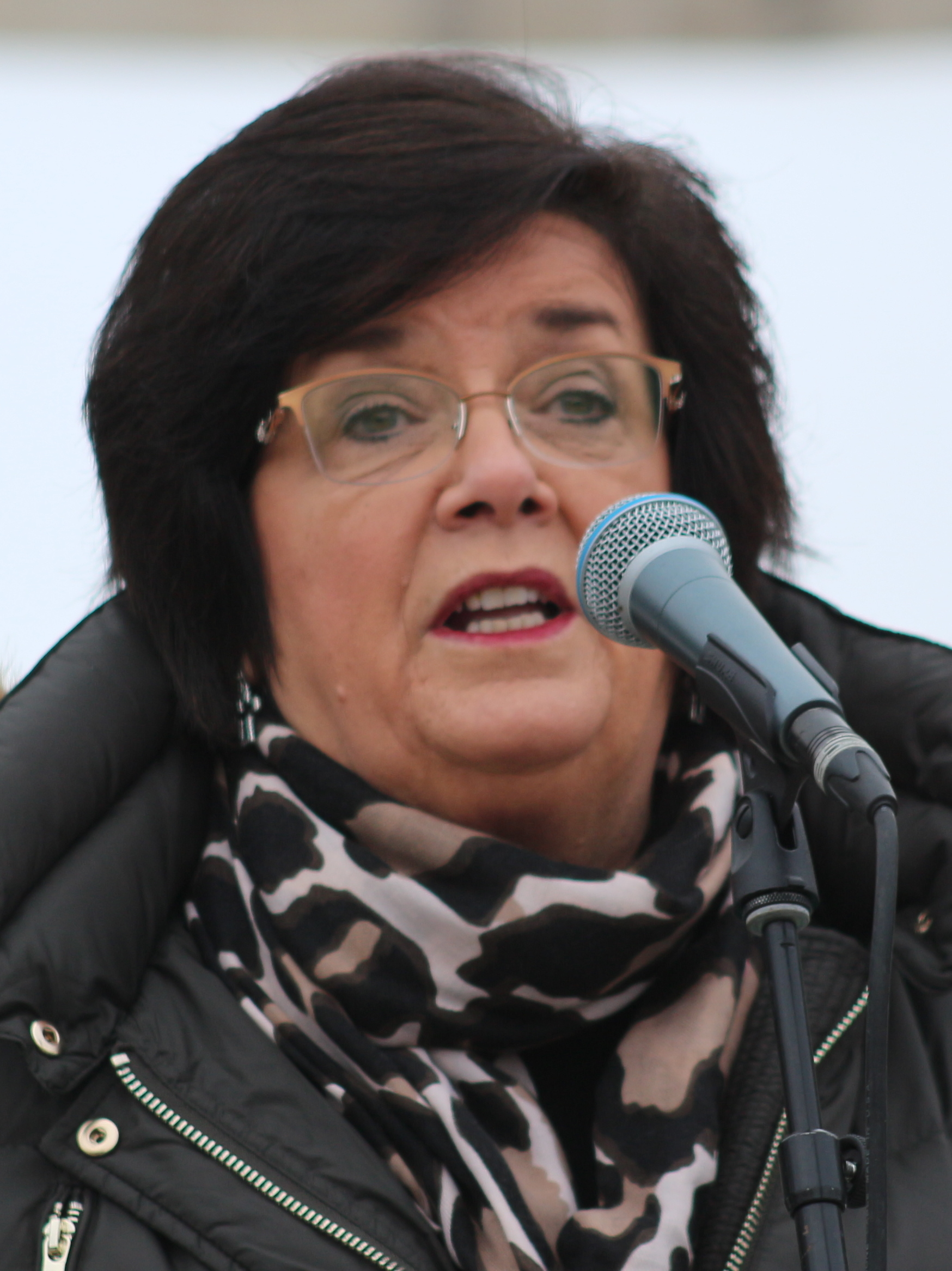

Member of the Nebraska Legislature from the 17th district
- In office January 4, 2017 – January 8, 2025
- Preceded by: Dave Bloomfield
- Succeeded by: Glen Meyer

Personal details
- Born: Joni Jones; July 28, 1958 (age 67) Omaha, Nebraska, U.S.
- Party: Republican
- Spouse: Michael Albrecht (m. 2010)
- Children: 6
- Occupation: Farmer

Joni Albrecht (née Jones; born July 28, 1958) is an American politician who served in the Nebraska Legislature representing the 17th district from 2017 to 2025. She previously served on the Papillion City Council and Sarpy County Board of Commissioners.

== Political positions ==
=== Abortion ===
Albrecht opposes abortion, and introduced several bills to restrict it in the state of Nebraska.

In 2017, Albrecht told the Lincoln Journal Star that she was "shocked" by the number of abortions in the state of Nebraska, commenting that "[w]e need to start talking about things differently and not thinking that it's just so easy to just take a life." On the subject of heartbeat bills being passed in numerous states in 2017, Albrecht commented that she was excited, "but I hope that we're all mindful of what's right for the woman."

In 2021, Albrecht introduced a resolution in the Nebraska Legislature recognizing Julie Schmit-Albin, the daughter of Nebraska Senator Loran Schmit. Among other things, the resolution praised Schmit-Albin for having "successfully shepherded numerous significant pro-life bills through the process to be signed into law by Nebraska governors". The resolution also praised Schmit-Albin as "never one to let a public official waffle on pro-life legislation", and recognized her as the director for the Nebraska Right to Life organization for thirty years, starting in 1989; the resolution also cites the Lincoln Journal Star, which wrote "Check with Schmit-Albin if you want to win" of her political influence. The resolution was adopted by the Nebraska Legislature.

=== LGBTQ people ===
In 2021, the Nebraska Department of Education proposed new state health education standards that would include lessons for kindergarteners about family structures, including families with same-gender parents. The standards would also teach first-graders about gender identity and gender stereotypes, and teach sixth-graders about sexual orientation. Albrecht was part of a group of 30 state legislators that signed a letter urging the Nebraska Department of Education not to adopt the standards. The standards would have been optional if approved.

== Electoral history ==
Albrecht served on the Papillion City Council from 1998 to 2005 and the Sarpy County Board of Commissioners from 2006 to 2010.

Nebraska's 17th district state legislature election, 2020
Primary election
Party	Candidate	Votes	%
Independent	Joni Albrecht	3,963	72.7%
Independent	Sheryl Lindau	1,489	27.3%
Total votes		5,452	100.0
General election
Independent	Joni Albrecht	8,310	68.0%
Independent	Sheryl Lindau	3,907	32.0%
Total votes		12,217	100.0
