= Jason Prokop =

Nebraskan state senator

Member of the Nebraska Legislature from the 27th district
- Incumbent
- Assumed office January 8, 2025
- Preceded by: Anna Wishart

Personal details
- Party: Democratic

Jason Prokop is an American politician from Lincoln, Nebraska, who has served in the Nebraska Legislature representing the 27th district since 2025.
