= Bruce Bostelman =

American politician

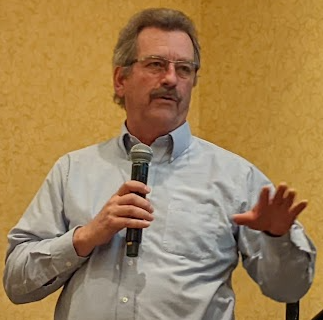

Member of the Nebraska Legislature from the 23rd district
- In office January 4, 2017 – January 8, 2025
- Preceded by: Jerry Johnson
- Succeeded by: Jared Storm

Personal details
- Born: July 20, 1962 (age 64) Superior, Nebraska, U.S.
- Party: Republican
- Spouse: Jan
- Children: 2
- Education: Community College of the Air Force; Bellevue University (BS)
- Occupation: Farmer

Military service
- Allegiance: United States
- Branch/service: United States Air Force
- Years of service: 1980-2000

Bruce Lee Bostelman (born July 20, 1962) is an American politician who served in the Nebraska Legislature representing the 23rd district from 2017 to 2025.

== Early life ==
Bostelman was born in Superior, Nebraska, in 1962, to Dwayne Bostelman and Avis Pingel and was baptized in the Lutheran faith. He graduated from Superior High School in 1980. After high school, Bostelman joined the United States Air Force and served as a security specialist through 1984, and then as a paralegal from 1985 to 2000. He received an associate's degree in paralegal science from the Community College of the Air Force and a Bachelor of Science in business management from Bellevue University in 2002. In 2001, he was promoted to director for Pre Paid Legal Services Inc.

== Political career ==
In 2016, Bostelman was elected to the Nebraska Unicameral. In 2016 and in his 2020 reelection campaign, Bostelman campaigned on issues of opposing tax increases, opposing extending public benefits to illegal immigrants, supporting veterans, opposing human trafficking, and retaining the death penalty. Among the bills Bostelman presented in 2017 was a bill to give spouses of active duty and recently discharged service members preference for hiring by government entities in Nebraska. In 2018, Bostelman worked to weaken the Nebraska Public Records Act, pushing bills that gave exemptions to records created in the registration, possession, or sale of guns and that gave exemptions to public power utilities companies.

Bostelman is noted for his anti-tax stance. He and Elmwood's Robert Clements received the top scores from anti-tax group, Nebraska Taxpayers for Freedom in 2019. Bostelman was the sole vote against allowing Gage County, Nebraska, to raise sales taxes to reimburse the exonerated Beatrice Six. He also supported Governor Pete Ricketts' opposition of Critical Race Theory at the University of Nebraska in 2021.

=== Natural Resources Committee Chair ===
In 2022, Bostelman served as chair of the Natural Resources Committee. In this role, he was heavily involved in 2022 water disputes with Colorado, Nebraska's neighboring state to the west. He is also a key player in cleanup of the Mead, Nebraska AltEn factory pesticide contamination site.

=== Media coverage ===
Bostelman received national media attention for a speech on the floor of the legislature in which he repeated a debunked rumor about schools providing litter boxes for students who identify as furries. "They meow and they bark and they interact with their teachers in this fashion," Bostelman said during legislative debate. "And now schools are wanting to put litter boxes in the schools for these children to use. How is this sanitary?" He later acknowledged that the story was not true; "It was just something I felt that if this really was happening, we needed to address it and address it quickly," Bostelman said.

The litter box rumor is connected to attempts to legally regulate transgender students' bathroom usage in conservative states.

== Personal life ==
Bostelman married Jan Uldman in 1992. They have two children: Micah and Jen.
