= Ken Schilz =

American politician

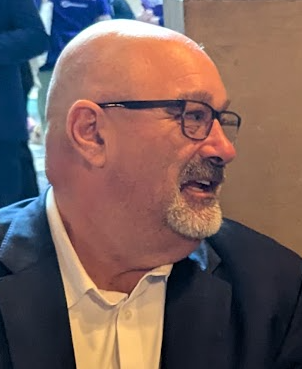

Member of the Nebraska Legislature from the 47th district
- In office 2009–2017
- Preceded by: Philip Erdman
- Succeeded by: Steve Erdman

Personal details
- Born: January 17, 1969 (age 57) Ogallala, Nebraska, U.S.
- Party: Republican

Ken Schilz (born January 17, 1969) is an American politician who was a member of the unicameral Nebraska Legislature. He was born in and resides in Ogallala, Nebraska, and helps on his family-owned farm. Schilz and his wife, Deb, have two children.

== State legislature ==
Schilz was elected in 2008 to represent the 47th Nebraska legislative district. He sat on the Agriculture, Business and Labor, and Natural Resources committees. He proposed LB640, an act relating to the Nebraska Advantage Act that amends certain sections of the advantage act to allow cities an option on whether local option sales and use tax is refundable. He also proposed LB101, an act to opt Nebraska out of Daylight Saving Time, claiming that it will simplify life in the Nebraska Panhandle.

== See also ==
- Nebraska Legislature

Preceded by Philip Erdman	Nebraska state senator – District 47; 2009–present	Incumbent
