= Terrell McKinney =

American politician (born 1990)

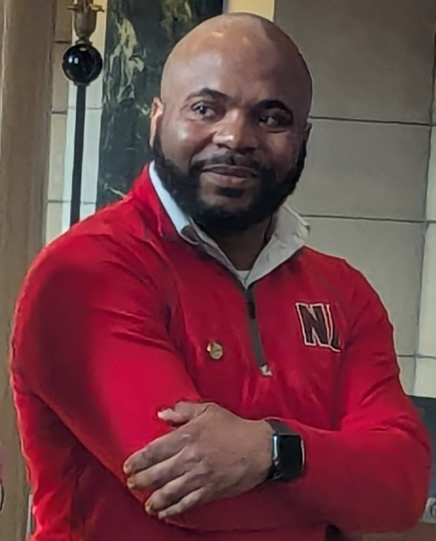

Member of the Nebraska Legislature from the 11th district
- Incumbent
- Assumed office January 6, 2021
- Preceded by: Ernie Chambers

Personal details
- Born: August 17, 1990 (age 36) Omaha, Nebraska, U.S.
- Education: Maryville University; Midland University
- Website: People for Terrell McKinney

Terrell McKinney (born August 17, 1990) is an American politician who is a member of the Nebraska Legislature. He has represented the 11th district since 2021, replacing Nebraska's longest-serving senator, Ernie Chambers. McKinney is the 14th Black member of the Nebraska Legislature, and the ninth since it converted to a unicameral body in 1937.

In 2021 McKinney introduced a bill requiring school districts to include financial literacy in elementary and middle school curriculum. He also introduced a bill banning employment discrimination based on ethnic hairstyle. McKinney supported Republican John S. McCollister's bill to expand SNAP program benefits. McKinney helped to override Governor Pete Ricketts veto of the expansion, although he would have liked the expansion of SNAP to have been even larger.

McKinney supports community organizations serving Omaha's Black community. He presented a resolution commending the organization Black Men United for distributing food to those in need during the COVID-19 pandemic.
