= Eliot Bostar =

American politician

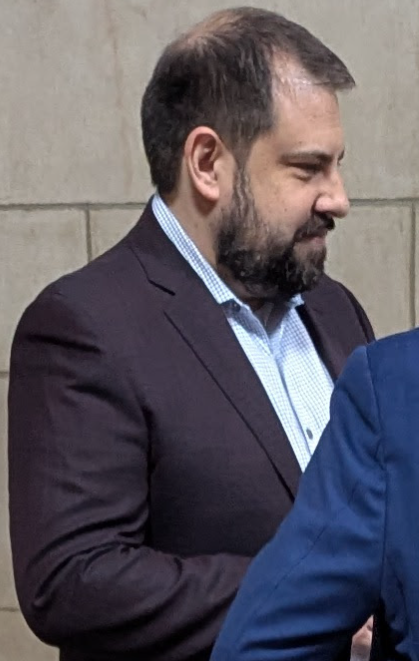

Member of the Nebraska Legislature from the 29th district
- Incumbent
- Assumed office January 6, 2021
- Preceded by: Kate Bolz

Personal details
- Born: May 5, 1987 (age 39) New York, U.S.
- Party: Democratic
- Children: 1
- Education: Embry–Riddle Aeronautical University (BS)

Eliot Bostar (born May 5, 1987) is an American politician serving as a member of the Nebraska Legislature from the 29th district. Elected in November 2020, he assumed office on January 6, 2021.

== Personal life ==
Bostar was born and raised in New York. He graduated from St. John's Northwestern Military Academy in 2005 and earned a Bachelor of Science degree from Embry–Riddle Aeronautical University in 2009.

Bostar married his wife, Carrie, in 2015. They have one child.

In 2008, Bostar worked as an intern for the Port Authority of New York and New Jersey. From 2009 to 2011, he served as an advisor in the Office of the Governor of New York. He was also a field organizer for the Barack Obama 2012 presidential campaign. He has since worked as the executive director of Conservation Nebraska and Nebraska Conservation Voters.

Bostar is a former board member of the Lincoln Electrical System and Lincoln Climate Resiliency Task Force.

== Nebraska State Legislature ==
Bostar was elected to the Nebraska Legislature in November 2020 and assumed office on January 6, 2021. In 2024, he ran unopposed and was reelected to a second term.

As of 2025, Eliot Bostar is a member of Banking, Commerce and Insurance and Revenue committee. Bostar is also a member of the Select and Special committees for Committee on Committees, Reference, Rules, Executive Board, Legislature’s Planning, Streamlined Sales and Use Tax System, and the Statewide Tourism And Recreational Water Access and Resource Sustainability (LB406).

District 29 of Nebraska's Legislative District includes a large portion of the city of Lincoln, Nebraska - roughly D Street to Old Cheney, a portion of 27th Street to 70th Street, and a portion of 14th Street to 56th Street.

=== Gambling ===
Bostar introduced legislation to usher in online sports betting. The bill did not pass.

=== School Choice and Education ===
Bostar is for increasing funding to education and has introduced several pieces of legislation in relation to education including Legislative Bill 417 (LB417), Provide for administration of the Nebraska Promise Program by the Board of Regents of the University of Nebraska, adopt the College Promise Act, and change provisions relating to the Quality Education Accountability Act. As of Summer of 2025, the bill is on general file. He also introduced Legislative Bill 754 (LB754), Extend the commercial air filter pilot program of the State Department of Education which passed in 2022.

Bostar did try to pass Legislative Bill 627 (LB627), which would have provided free meals to students. The bill did not pass and has been indefinitely postponed.

=== Crime ===
Bostar has listed that public safety is one of his top priorities in the Unicameral. In 2022, Legislative Bill 1273 (LB1273), Provide an income tax deduction to retired law enforcement officers for health insurance premiums and change provisions relating to a waiver of tuition for law enforcement officers, was introduced by Bostar and passed in the legislature. Bostar crafted the bill to “help recruit and retain qualified law enforcement officers in Nebraska. This legislation expands benefits and ensures that our first responders are supported.”

Bostar has also expressed concern over prison overcrowding and providing programs to help formerly incarcerated individuals get back on their feet.

=== Taxes ===
Bostar would like to reduce property taxes.

=== Healthcare ===
Bostar is pro accessible healthcare for all, including measures such as setting a limit for the price of insulin and making sure that healthcare companies cover basic screenings such as mammograms and colonoscopies.

=== Housing ===
In Bostar’s first term in the legislature he introduced Legislative Bill 1176 (LB1176), Change the Affordable Housing Tax Credit Act and Legislative Bill 1217 (LB1217), Provide certain property tax exemptions and change valuation provisions relating to rent-restricted housing projects and sales-restricted houses, which would encourage affordable housing and lower housing costs for the elderly or those with permanent disabilities, respectfully. Both bills did not pass.

He introduced Legislative Bill 458 (LB458), Change provisions relating to tax sale certificates, real property sold for delinquent taxes, certain tax-related foreclosure actions, and land banks and adopt the Permitting Approval Timeliness Act and the By-Right Housing Development Act, which has been referred to the Revenue Committee.

=== State Budget ===
Bostar has mentioned his top priorities when it comes to budgeting are “public safety, education and healthcare.”

=== Economy ===
Bostar believes a driving force for improving the economy in Lincoln and the state should be prioritizing making the state attractive through better paying jobs, affordable childcare, housing, and healthcare.
