= Lou Ann Linehan =

American politician

Member of the Nebraska Legislature from the 39th district
- In office January 4, 2017 – January 8, 2025
- Preceded by: Beau McCoy
- Succeeded by: Tony Sorrentino

Personal details
- Born: September 16, 1955 (age 71) Beatrice, Nebraska, U.S.
- Party: Republican
- Education: University of Nebraska–Lincoln
- Website: www.LinehanforLegislature.com

Lou Ann Linehan (born September 16, 1955) is an American politician who served in the Nebraska Legislature representing the 39th district from 2017 to 2025. She was first elected to the legislature in 2016, and served as the chairwoman of the Revenue Committee. She is a Republican. She supports scholarships for family's to send students to attend the school of their choice.
