= Dan Lonowski =

Nebraskan state senator

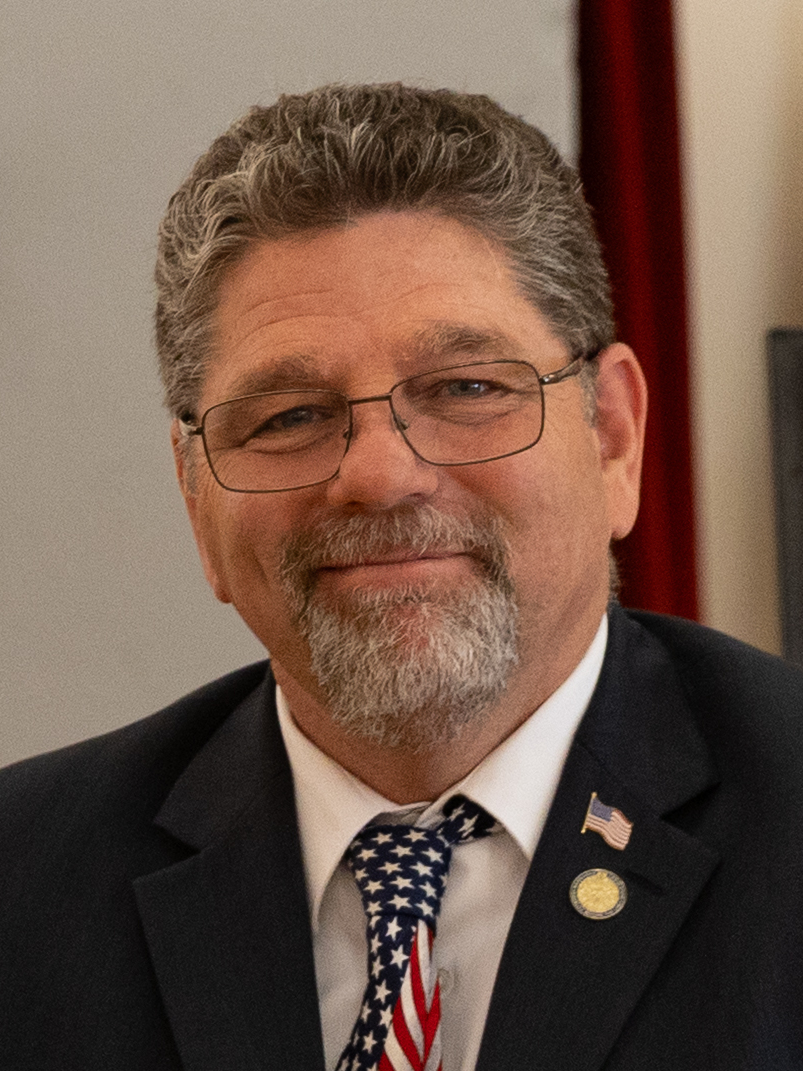
- Lonowski in 2026

Member of the Nebraska Legislature from the 33rd district
- Incumbent
- Assumed office January 8, 2025
- Preceded by: Steve Halloran

Personal details
- Born: June 27, 1962 (age 63)
- Party: Republican
- Spouse: Janet Lonowski
- Education: Graduate of Stromsburg High School, 1980; University of Nebraska-Lincoln (B.S. in journalism), 1985 (M.S. in education administration) and 1998.

Military service
- Branch/service: Army National Guard
- Years of service: 1980-2016
- Rank: Infantry officer and armor officer

Dan Lonowski is an American politician from Hastings, Nebraska, who has served in the Nebraska Legislature representing the 33rd district since 2025.
