= Joel T. Johnson =

American politician (1936–2026)

Member of the Nebraska Legislature from the 37th district
- In office July 1, 2002 – January 2009
- Preceded by: Doug Kristensen
- Succeeded by: Galen Hadley

Personal details
- Born: July 9, 1936 St. Paul, Minnesota, U.S.
- Died: January 16, 2026 (aged 89) Kearney, Nebraska, U.S.
- Party: Republican
- Education: University of Nebraska; University of Nebraska Medical Center
- Occupation: General Surgeon

Joel Theodore Johnson (July 9, 1936 – January 16, 2026) was an American politician who served as Nebraska state senator from Kearney, Nebraska, as well as in the Nebraska Legislature. He also worked as a general surgeon.

== Background ==
Johnson was born in St. Paul, Minnesota on July 9, 1936. He graduated from Axtell High School in 1954, the University of Nebraska in 1958, and the University of Nebraska Medical Center in 1961 with an M.D. From 1966 to 1968 he was in the U.S. Navy. He was a member of the American College of Surgeons, American Medical Association, First Lutheran Church of Kearney, and the Kearney Area Chamber of Commerce.

Johnson died in Kearney on January 16, 2026, at the age of 89.

== State legislature ==
Johnson was appointed to the Nebraska legislature by Governor Mike Johanns on July 1, 2002, to replace Doug Kristensen who had resigned. He was then elected in 2002 to represent the 37th Nebraska legislative district and reelected in 2004. He sat on the Banking, Commerce and Insurance, and Health and Human Services committees.
