= Anna Wishart =

American politician (born 1985)

Member of the Nebraska Legislature from the 27th district
- In office January 4, 2017 – January 8, 2025
- Preceded by: Colby Coash
- Succeeded by: Jason Prokop

Personal details
- Born: January 2, 1985 (age 41) Lincoln, Nebraska, U.S.
- Party: Democratic
- Education: Middlebury College
- Website: www.AnnaWishart.com

Anna Wishart (born January 2, 1985) is an American politician who served in the Nebraska Legislature from the 27th district from 2017 to 2025. She is a member of the Democratic Party.

== Personal life ==
She grew up in the 27th district in Lincoln, Nebraska, the same district that she now represents, which covers the majority of southwest Lincoln. She is an alumna of Middlebury College in Vermont where she graduated with a degree in Film Studies in 2007. Currently she works as the Director of Partnerships at Beyond School Bells which is a non-profit that works to create after-school and summer programming for Nebraska youths. She is married to former Lincoln Police office Joe Coleman who she met while attending Lincoln Southeast High School. Coleman now works for Lincoln Public Schools and they are registered foster parents through CEDARS Homes for Children. Wishart has also worked at Nebraska Foster and Adoptive Parent Association on their board.

== Early political activity ==
Wishart moved back to Nebraska after college and in 2011 was elected to the Lincoln Airport Authority where she served as chair of the board for 5 years. She is also a former legislative aid to state Senator Rick Kolowski of Omaha. She is a registered Democrat but supports the nonpartisan Unicameral Legislature in Nebraska.

== State Legislature ==
Wishart was first elected to office in 2016 and won reelection in 2020. In the legislature, Wishart served on the Appropriations Committee and the Tribal-Relations Committee. In 2018, she joined Adam Morfeld to create a committee to gather signatures for a petition to hold a ballot initiative referendum to legalize medical marijuana in Nebraska.

=== Medical marijuana ===
Medical marijuana is one of the key issues that Wishart focused on. She led and supported the initiative to legalize medical marijuana in Nebraska, and is open to future legalization of recreational marijuana in the state as well.

=== Abortion ===
Wishart has stated that she struggles with the idea of abortion, but she believes that it should be the woman's decision to make about her own body. She cites this in part because of her involvement as a foster parent.

=== LGBT+ discrimination ===
Wishart was in favor of legislation to protect LGBT workers from being discriminated against in the workplace, saying "I don't think anybody should be fired based solely on who they love".
