= Beau Ballard =

American politician

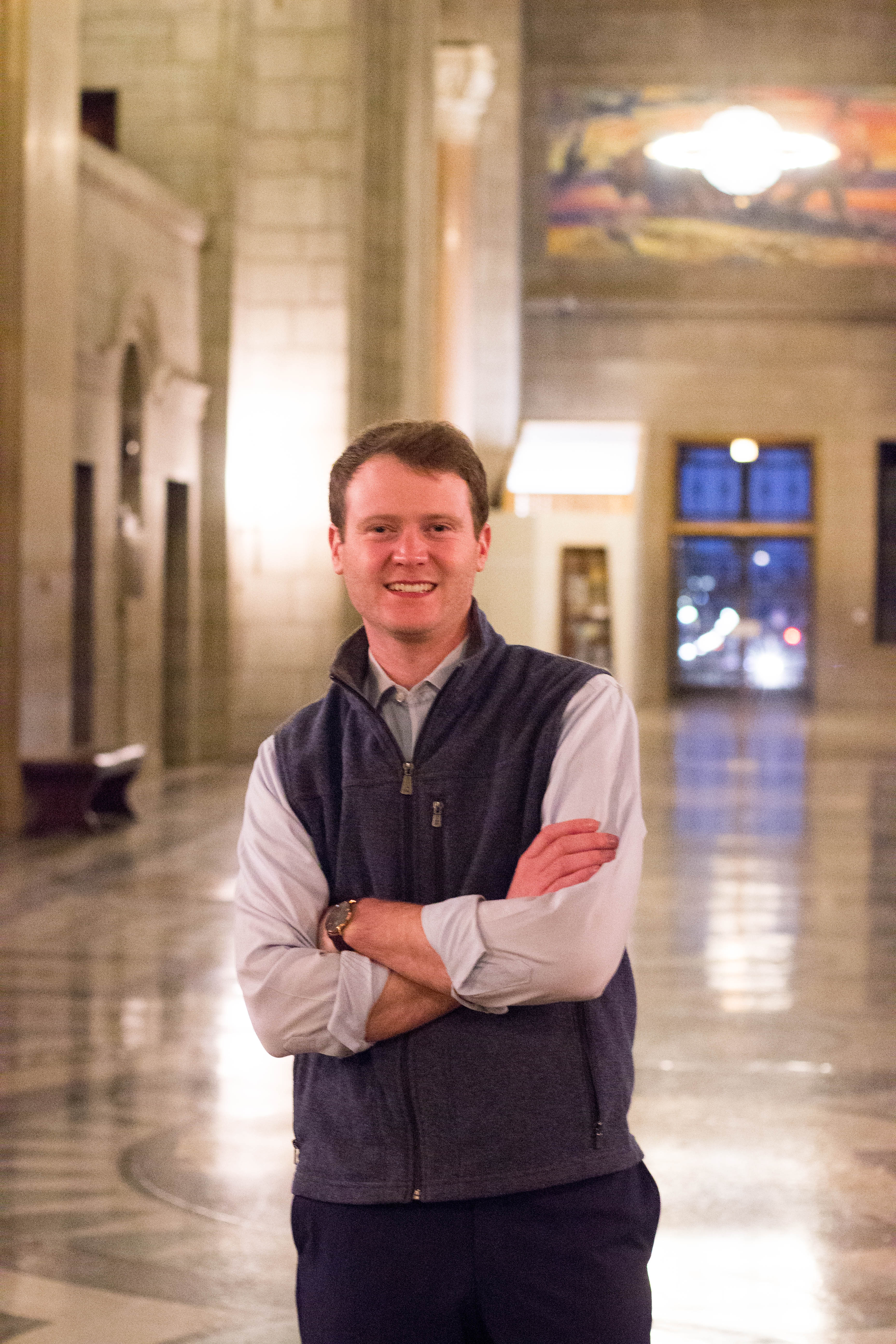

Member of the Nebraska Legislature from the 21st district
- Incumbent
- Assumed office January 4, 2023
- Appointed by: Pete Ricketts
- Preceded by: Mike Hilgers

Personal details
- Born: May 5, 1994 (age 32) Lincoln, Nebraska
- Party: Republican
- Spouse: Katie Wyskoczka
- Education: Colorado Christian University; University of Nebraska–Lincoln
- Occupation: Business owner

Beau Ballard (born May 5, 1994) is a member of the Nebraska Legislature from Lincoln, Nebraska, in District 21 who was appointed by Governor Pete Ricketts in consultation with incoming Governor Jim Pillen to fill the seat of former Senator Mike Hilgers who was elected Nebraska Attorney General. Ballard was a former legislative aide in the office of Senator Hilgers for five years prior to his appointment.

== Early life ==
Beau was raised in the small town of Raymond, Nebraska, located about twenty minutes north of Lincoln, Nebraska, the Capital City. His family owns and operates James Arthur Vineyards, Nebraska's largest winery.

Ballard graduated from Parkview Christian High School in Lincoln before attending Colorado Christian University in Denver, Colorado where he obtained Business Finance and Political Science Degree. Ballard returned to southeast Nebraska to attend the University of Nebraska Lincoln, receiving a Masters of Business Administration with an emphasis in Finance.

== Business Career ==
Ballard is the founder of two small businesses in Lincoln, BJB Strategies and the Rabbit Hole Bakery. In 2021, he was honored by the Lincoln Independent Business Association with a Young Business Leader of the Year award. However he no longer owns The Rabbit Hole Bakery as he sold it in 2024 to focus more time on his political career.

== Nebraska State Legislature (2023-present) ==
=== Appointment ===
Ballard was appointed by outgoing governor Ricketts after Mike Hilgers won election to become Nebraska Attorney General. Ballard was a former legislative aide in the office of Senator Hilgers for five years prior to his appointment. He assumed office on January 4th, 2023.

=== 2024 State Legislature campaign ===
After his appointment he opted to run to secure a full term in the 2024 election. His campaign focused on property taxes, infrastructure, education, and health care.

In the primary he ran against Seth Derner and Bryan Paseka. He got first place with 3,829 votes (54.3%), with Seth Derner getting 2,136 votes (30.3%), and Bryan Paseka getting 1,087 votes (15.4%) Because Nebraska's primaries are non-partisan the top two vote-getters go on to face each other in the general election.

Ballard would go on to win the general election. He received 9,509 votes (55.3%), while Derner received 7,689 votes (44.7%).

=== Tenure ===
As of 2025, Beau Ballard serves as the Chairperson on the Nebraska Retirement Systems Committee, Vice Chairperson on the Transportation and Telecommunications Committee, and member on the standing committee for Health and Human Services. He is also a member of the Reference committee, Executive Board, and special committee for Statewide Tourism And Recreational Water Access and Resource Sustainability.

District 21 of Nebraska's Legislative District includes the northwest portion of Lincoln, Nebraska and the towns of Malcolm, Raymond, Davey, and Waverly.

==== Resolutions ====
As of Summer of 2025, Ballard has several Legislative Resolutions that have been referred to committees for review:

Legislative Resolution 211, Interim study to examine the statewide availability of assisted-living memory care for individuals with Alzheimer's disease or other dementia and the accessibility of this type of care for medicaid beneficiaries. The resolution has been referred to the Health and Human Services Committee.
Legislative Resolution 176, Interim study to examine the Nebraska Right to Farm Act in comparison to similar laws in other states that rely on agriculture and recruitment of agriculture-related businesses as a significant portion of the economy. This resolution has been referred to the Agriculture Committee.
Legislative Resolution 175, Interim study to determine the impact on commerce, commercial and economic activity, and the community by having a United States Postal Service office in the West Haymarket area of downtown Lincoln. This resolution has been referred to the Banking, Commerce and Insurance Committee.
Legislative Resolution 442, Interim study to examine the scope and function of the Nebraska Health Information Initiative and its affiliates in Nebraska. This resolution has been referred to the Health and Human Services Committee.

== Political positions ==
=== LGBTQA+ ===
Ballard is against allowing gender affirming surgery for minors. He is also against trans students playing in boy/girls sports that do not match with gender assigned at birth.

=== Abortion Rights ===
Ballard is pro-life and against abortion.

=== Gambling ===
Ballard is for online sports betting, but does believe safety measures need to be included to help those with gambling addiction.

=== Marijuana ===
Ballard is against recreational marijuana.

=== School Choice and Education ===
Ballard is for more school choice for parents.

Ballard introduced Legislative Bill 481 (LB 481), Adopt the Foster Care Child Scholarships Act. The bill, which has been referred to the Health and Human Services Committee as of Summer 2025, would set up a scholarship fund through the Department of Health and Human Services. Students in foster care and their siblings would be able to access the fund to attend private schools, if they meet eligibility standards.

=== Property Taxes ===
Ballard has stated that one of his main three goals while in the legislature is to improve property taxes.

=== Healthcare ===
Ballard introduced Legislative Bill (LB 463), Require school districts to develop a cardiac emergency response plan under the School Safety and Security Reporting Act and provide for grants for such plans from the Medicaid Managed Care Excess Profit Fund. As of Summer 2025, the bill is listed on the General File.

=== Insurance ===
Ballard introduced the Pet Insurance Act, which was passed in the Unicameral. The bill outlines regulations for pet insurance policies in Nebraska.

=== Housing ===
Ballard believes in reducing regulations to make housing more affordable to build along with investing in funding for middle class housing.

=== Infrastructure ===
Ballard would like to address finishing the East Beltway, investing in new water infrastructure for the city of Lincoln and surrounding areas, and bringing high-speed broadband to rural communities.

== Electoral history ==
=== 2024 election ===
Nebraska's 21st Legislative District primary election results 2024
Party	Candidate	Votes	%
Republican	Beau Ballard	3,829	54.3
Democratic	Seth Derner	2,136	30.3
Democratic	Bryan Paseka	1,087	15.4
Total votes		7,052	100.00

Nebraska's 21st Legislative District election results 2024
Party	Candidate	Votes	%
Republican	Beau Ballard	9,509	55.3
Democratic	Seth Derner	7,689	44.7
