= Glen Meyer =

Nebraskan state senator

Member of the Nebraska Legislature from the 17th district
- Incumbent
- Assumed office January 8, 2025
- Preceded by: Joni Albrecht

Personal details
- Born: March 14, 1951 (age 75) Wayne, Nebraska
- Party: Republican
- Spouse: Lorie Meyer
- Children: 3

Glen Meyer (born March 14, 1951) is an American politician from Pender, Nebraska, who has served in the Nebraska Legislature representing the 17th district since 2025.

Graduated from Pender Public High School in 1985.
