= Steve Halloran =

American politician

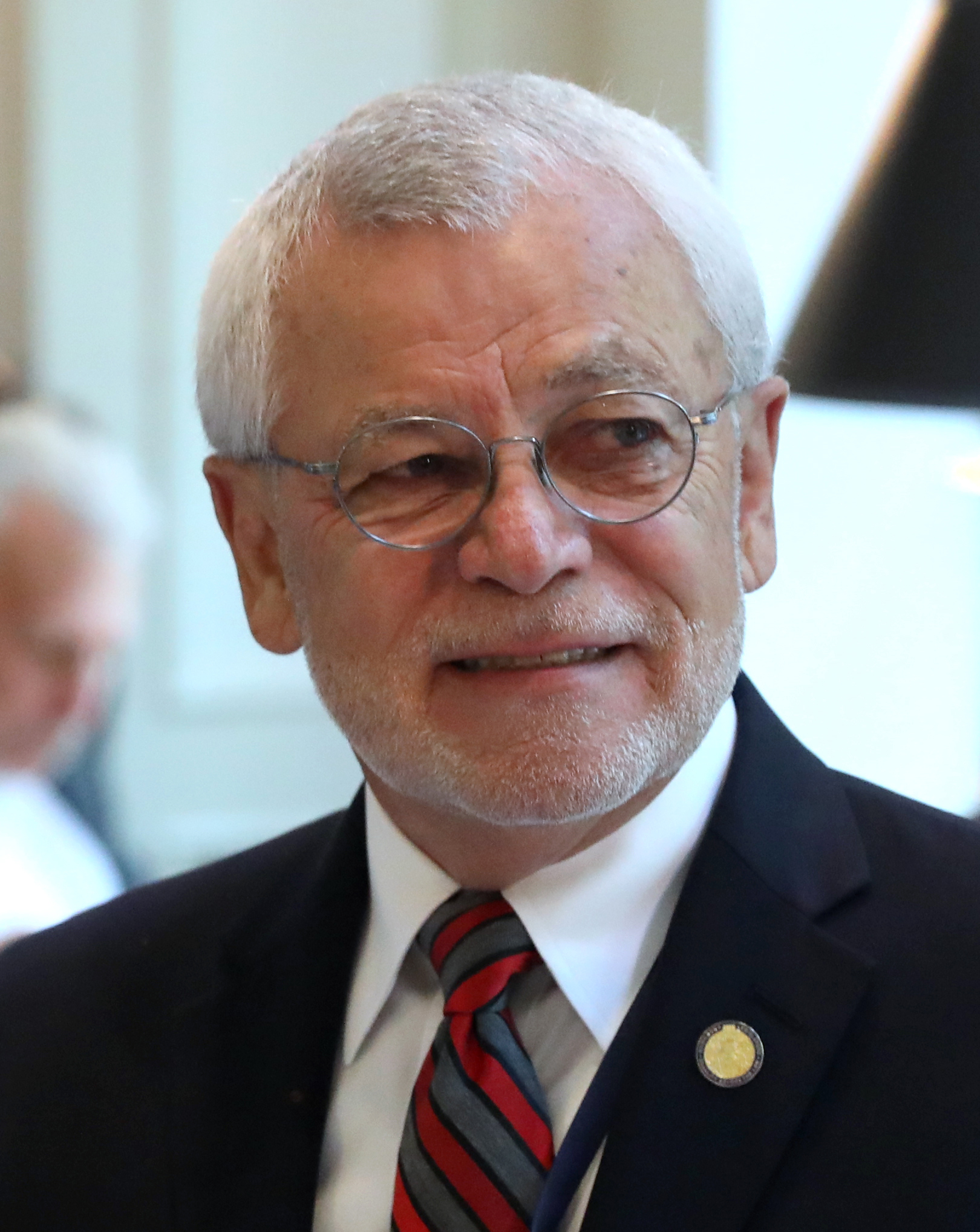

Member of the Nebraska Legislature from the 33rd district
- In office January 4, 2017 – January 8, 2025
- Preceded by: Les Seiler
- Succeeded by: Dan Lonowski

Personal details
- Born: June 29, 1948 (age 78) Hastings, Nebraska, U.S.
- Party: Republican

Steve Halloran (born June 29, 1948) is an American politician who served in the Nebraska Legislature from the 33rd district from 2017 to 2025.

== Career ==
In the late 1980s and early 1990s, Halloran was president of the Nebraska branch of the National Farmers Organization. In this role, Halloran was critical of US President Ronald Reagan's agricultural policy as being too favorable to ranchers and food processors and unfavorable to grain-growing farmers. Halloran was elected president of the NFO in December 1991. In that position, he advocated farmer cooperation and the development of domestic grain consumption over grain exporting. By 2006, however, Halloran had retired from farming and was co-owner of a HuHot Mongolian Grill restaurant in Billings, Montana.

== Politics ==
Halloran was elected to the Nebraska Legislature in 2016, where he "largely aligned himself with the far-right flank of Nebraska politics" according to the New York Times.

=== Education ===
As a state senator, Halloran was particularly critical of education policy. In February 2017, he proposed a bill that would remove funding from the Nebraska Master Teacher program. In this, Halloran has frequently been allied with state senator Steve Erdman. Along with Erdman, in April 2017 Halloran was one of three senators that opposed new rules requiring Nebraska schools to expand accommodation to students with children including breastfeeding accommodations. In August 2017, the University of Nebraska (UN) became embroiled in a controversy when a graduate student and an undergraduate student entered into a political argument related to the undergraduate's involvement in Turning Point USA, a conservative education advocacy organization. After a video of the event was released, Erdman, Halloran, and state senator Tom Brewer were outspoken in criticism of the grad student and UNL that it was hostile to conservative viewpoints. A group of 70 UN faculty accused the senators and Nebraska governor Pete Ricketts of being politically motivated in their criticism and seeking to damage the university. The graduate student lost funding as a result of the dispute, a move that was heavily criticized by AAUP, the faculty Union. The senators proposed a bill that would restrict the ability of the university to govern itself with regards to speech issues. They also called for an outside agency to study campus attitudes towards conservatives. The university suggested using Gallup for this study, but the senators felt that Gallup could not be unbiased and insisted that the Foundation for Individual Rights in Education (FIRE) be used instead, although FIRE would determine the graduate student was within her rights and should not have lost her position. The senators fight with the University continued for much of 2018. In March, they proposed an amendment to strip $17 million of funding from UNL, which ultimately failed. In October, Halloran claimed that the university sought to indoctrinate students to become liberal at a panel put on by the Academic Freedom Coalition of Nebraska.

=== Comments about rape ===
Halloran inserted the name of a colleague into a rape scene which he read aloud on the floor of the legislature in March 2024. The scene was an excerpt from a book, Lucky by Alice Sebold, which Halloran is attempting to ban from schools for obscenity. Another senator launched a formal workplace harassment investigation against Halloran.

=== Other ===
Halloran called for an amendment to the US Constitution requiring federal fiscal restraint in January 2019, opposed increasing tipped workers minimum wage in March 2019, and in October 2021 called for a law opposing vaccine mandates during the Covid-19 pandemic.
