= Dave Wordekemper =

American politician

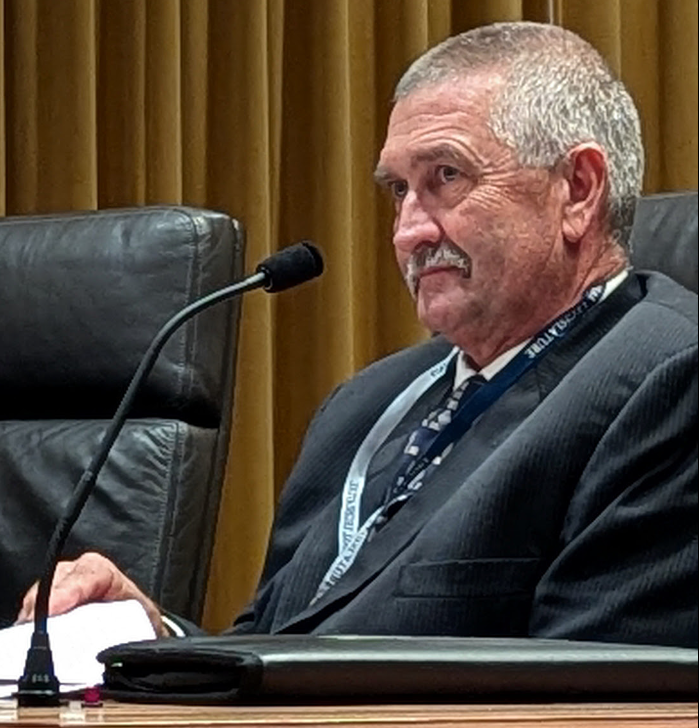

Member of the Nebraska Legislature from the 15th district
- Incumbent
- Assumed office January 8, 2025
- Preceded by: Lynne Walz

Personal details
- Born: January 24, 1966 (age 60) West Point, Nebraska, U.S.
- Party: Republican
- Spouse: Barb Wordekemper
- Education: Virginia Western Community College

Dave Wordekemper (born January 24, 1966) is a Nebraska state senator. He was elected in 2024 to represent District 15, which includes Fremont, Nebraska, and surrounding areas.

== Personal background ==
Wordekemper is a firefighter and paramedic. He is married to Barb, who is a registered nurse. They have two sons and a daughter.

== Legislative campaign ==
Wordekemper announced his candidacy for the District 15 legislative seat on February 20, 2024. He promised a focus on public safety issues, controls on state spending, and tax relief.

In the 2024 Nebraska primary election, he received 3,136 votes for nearly 44 percent of the total in a five-way race. He advanced to the general-election ballot along with Roxie Kracl, who received just over 25 percent. He defeated Kracl in the general election on November 5, 2024, receiving 9,035 votes for 53 percent of the total ballots cast.
