= Tanya Storer =

Nebraskan state senator

Member of the Nebraska Legislature from the 43rd district
- Incumbent
- Assumed office January 8, 2025
- Preceded by: Tom Brewer

Personal details
- Party: Republican

Tanya Storer is an American politician from Whitman, Nebraska, who has served in the Nebraska Legislature representing the 43rd district since 2025.
