= Tony Sorrentino (politician) =

Nebraskan state senator

Member of the Nebraska Legislature from the 39th district
- Incumbent
- Assumed office January 8, 2025
- Preceded by: Lou Ann Linehan

Personal details
- Party: Republican

Tony Sorrentino is an American politician from Elkhorn, Nebraska, who has served in the Nebraska Legislature representing the 39th district since 2025.
