= Jen Day =

American politician

Member of the Nebraska Legislature from the 49th district
- In office January 6, 2021 – January 8, 2025
- Preceded by: Andrew La Grone
- Succeeded by: Bob Andersen

Personal details
- Born: July 28, 1981 (age 45) Council Bluffs, Iowa, U.S.
- Party: Democratic
- Education: University of Nebraska Omaha
- Website: Jen Day for Nebraska

Jen Day (born July 28, 1981) is an American politician and weightlifter. She was a member of the Nebraska Legislature from 2021 to 2025.

Day became an activist in 2010, advocating for public education among other topics. She participated in the IFW World Masters Championship weightlifting competition in 2016, finishing in 7th place.

She ran for a seat in the state's unicameral legislature in 2020, defeating incumbent Andrew La Grone. The race was marked by an incident in which La Grone's campaign mailed an attack ad flier to voters with a misidentified photograph — the flyer featured a volunteer on Day's campaign mislabeled as Day herself. Day assumed office in January 2021 representing the 49th district.

During her tenure she was a member of the legislature's education committee. Day advocated for school epilepsy safety and for freedom of the press for high school student newspapers.

She supports legal abortion, saying "the Nebraska Legislature must reject medically unnecessary restrictions on abortion."

Day ran for reelection in 2024. She was defeated by Bob Andersen 52.12% to 47.88%.

Day is a business owner and fitness coach. She is married to Jonathan Day; they have two children. Since 2016 Day has been president of the Nebraska Local Weightlifting Committee.
