= Paul Strommen =

Nebraskan state senator

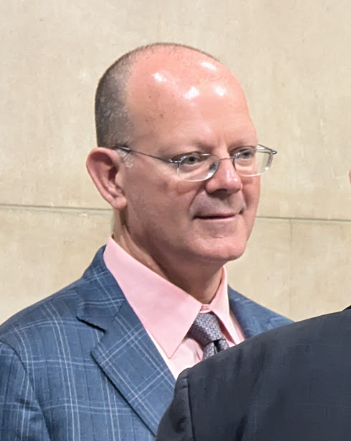

Member of the Nebraska Legislature from the 47th district
- Incumbent
- Assumed office January 8, 2025
- Preceded by: Steve Erdman

Personal details
- Party: Republican

Paul E. Strommen is an American politician from Sidney, Nebraska, who has served in the Nebraska Legislature representing the 47th district since 2025.
