= Galen Hadley =

American politician

Speaker of the Nebraska Legislature
- In office January 7, 2015 – January 4, 2017
- Preceded by: Greg L. Adams
- Succeeded by: Jim Scheer

Member of the Nebraska Legislature from the 37th district
- In office January 2009 – January 4, 2017
- Preceded by: Joel T. Johnson
- Succeeded by: John Lowe

Personal details
- Born: March 9, 1942 (age 84) Lincoln, Nebraska, U.S.
- Party: Republican
- Education: University of Nebraska–Lincoln (BS, PhD); University of Colorado Boulder (MBA)

Galen Hadley (born March 9, 1942) is an American politician, accountant, and academic who served as a member of the Nebraska Legislature from 2009 to 2017. He served previously as mayor of Kearney, Nebraska.

== Early life and education ==
Hadley's father was a salesman, and his mother was a housewife. He also has a younger brother and a younger sister. Hadley graduated from Lincoln High School and studied at the University of Nebraska–Lincoln. He graduated in 1964 with a bachelor's degree in accounting. While he was working in Denver, he earned his master's from the University of Colorado Boulder through their night program. Eventually he returned to the University of Nebraska at Lincoln and earned his PhD in accounting.

== Career ==
Haldey taught and held higher positions at different colleges including the University of Nebraska at Kearney and the University of South Dakota. From 2004 to 2006, Hadley was the mayor of Kearney, Nebraska.

Hadley was elected in 2008, defeating Jim George, to represent the 37th Nebraska legislative district. In 2012, he defeated Josiah H. Woodward and Mike McShea to win a second term.
