= Bob Andersen =

American politician (born 1963)

Member of the Nebraska Legislature from the 49th district
- Incumbent
- Assumed office January 8, 2025
- Preceded by: Jen Day

Personal details
- Born: February 11, 1963 (age 63) Tiffin, Ohio, U.S.
- Party: Republican
- Spouse: Julie Andersen
- Children: 2
- Website: https://bob4ne.com/

Bob Andersen (born February, 1963) is an American politician, currently serving as a state senator in Nebraska.

== Personal life ==
Andersen was born on February 11, 1963, in Tiffin, Ohio and graduated from Seaholm High School in Birmingham, Michigan, in 1981. He earned his associate degree at Community College of the U.S. Air Force and graduated from Peru State College in 2002 with a bachelor's degree.

Andersen joined the Air Force in 1982 after and left the service in 2003. He is a member of St. Patrick’s Catholic Church, along with being a member of the American Legion, National Rifle Association of America, and 88 Tactical (a firearms shooting and training facility) in Sarpy County. He is married to Julie Andersen.

Andersen enlisted straight out of high school at age 19. He trained as a Russian linguist and signals analyst and worked in intelligence during the Cold War, with his first posting in divided Berlin. He was raised outside Detroit and has lived in Nebraska since 1991. He and his wife, Julie, have two sons, Joe and Jack.

Bob runs a non-profit organization named the Defense Scientific and Technical Services. He is also a Subject Matter Expert with a defense contractor.

== Nebraska State Legislature ==
Andersen entered the 2024 race for the 49th district, which then included parts of La Vista, Papillion, Gretna, and the Chalco Hills area of Sarpy County. In the May 2024 nonpartisan primary, Andersen and incumbent Jen Day advanced past a third candidate, Caleb Muhs. Muhs endorsed Andersen before the general election.

On November 5, 2024, Andersen defeated incumbent State Senator Jen Day for Nebraska 49th district by a close 908 votes. Jen receiving 10,247 votes, and Andersen receiving 11,155 votes.

As of 2025, Andersen serves as the Vice Chairperson on the Government, Military and Veterans Affairs Committee, member of the General Affairs Committee, member of the Urban Affairs Committee, and member of Homeland Security Policy Group.

District 49 of Nebraska's Legislative District includes the north-central portion of Sarpy County, including small portions of southwestern edge of the city of La Vista, Nebraska and a small portion of the northwestern edge of Papillion, Nebraska.

=== LGBTQA+ ===
Andersen is against expanding gender-affirming care for minors and is also against transgender individuals playing in sports that do not match biological genes. Andersen has also voiced his support for The Stand With Women Act, an anti-trans bill.

=== Abortion Rights ===
Andersen is against expanding abortion rights. During his 2024 campaign, Andersen said he personally believes life begins at conception, and he supports maintaining the state's 12-week abortion ban with limited exceptions.

=== Marijuana ===
Andersen is against legalizing recreational marijuana. He has also voiced concern of medical marijuana while on the General Affairs Committee.

=== School Choice ===
Andersen is supportive of publicly funded charter schools, including funding for religious-based education.

=== Government Assistance Programs ===
In 2025, Andersen introduced Legislative Bill 656 (LB 656), Change work requirements under the Supplemental Nutrition Assistance Program, which seeks to get rid of federal waivers based on how high unemployment rates are in a geographic region. As of July 2025, the bill is still listed on general file.

Andersen also introduced Legislative Bill 379 (LB 379), Change the maximum time limit for receipt of cash assistance under the Welfare Reform Act. As of July 2025, that bill is also listed on general file. Some critics of LB 379 argue that changes could make it harder for families in poverty to get financial stability.

Andersen also opposed Legislative Bill (LB 319), Change eligibility requirements for the Supplemental Nutrition Assistance Program, introduced by Senator Victor Rountree. The bill sought to allow for Nebraskan citizens with felony convictions to apply for the Supplemental Nutrition Assistance Program, also known as SNAP. LB 319 did pass in the Unicameral before being vetoed by Governor Jim Pillen.

=== Crime ===
In the 2025 legislative session, Andersen introduced Legislative Bill (LB 657), Create the offense of assault on a sports official and provide a penalty under the Nebraska Criminal Code, also called the Ref's Act. The bill aims to make any physical assault of a sports referee a felony and gives referee's more protection should they be assaulted.

Opponents of the bill argue that the Ref's Act is unnecessary as there are already heavy fines and jail time for physical assault of an individual, regardless of profession. As of July 2025, the bill has been referred to the Judiciary Committee.

=== Property Taxes ===
Andersen would like to place a cap on property taxes for residential and commercial properties. Per a post on X, Andersen is working with Senator Kathleen Kauth to "prioritize and use her draft Constitutional Amendment (LR12CA) to value property based on the purchase price with no increases." Andersen made LR12CA a priority bill, adding his name in March 2025.

=== Voting ===
In January 2025, Andersen added his name to Legislative Bill 3 (LB 3), Change provisions relating to selection of presidential electors. The bill was introduced by Senator Loren Lippincott and aims to get rid of Nebraska's split electoral vote. As of Summer 2025, the bill is on General File.
