= Jared Storm =

Nebraskan state senator

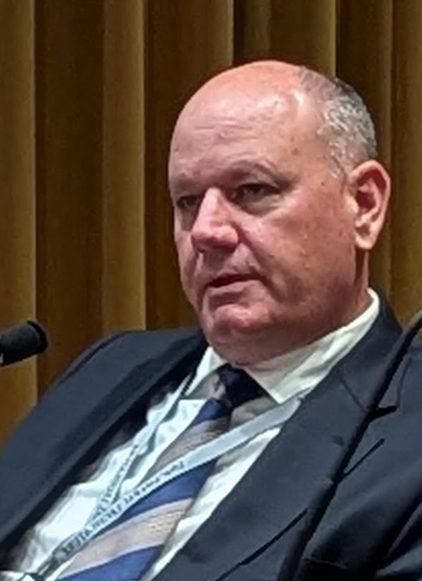

Member of the Nebraska Legislature from the 23rd district
- Incumbent
- Assumed office January 8, 2025
- Preceded by: Bruce Bostelman

Personal details
- Born: March 27, 1971 (age 55) Scott City, Kansas
- Party: Republican
- Spouse: Colleen Storm
- Children: 6
- Education: Kansas State University (BS); Fort Hays State University

Jared Storm (born March 27, 1971) is an American politician from David City, Nebraska, who has served in the Nebraska Legislature representing the 23rd district since 2025.
