= Kathleen Kauth (politician) =

American politician (born 1970)

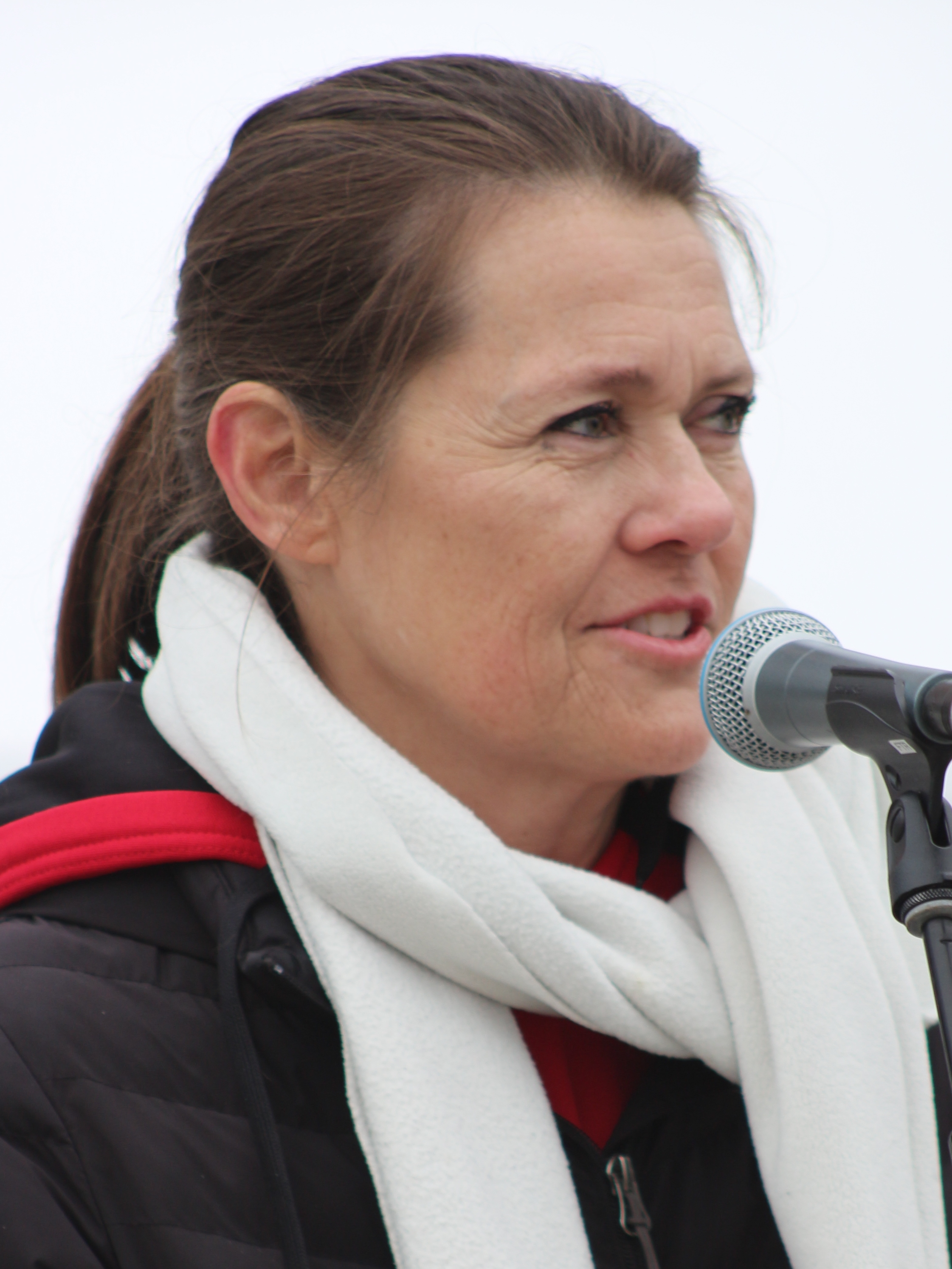

Member of the Nebraska Legislature from the 31st district
- Incumbent
- Assumed office June 7, 2022
- Appointed by: Pete Ricketts
- Preceded by: Rich Pahls

Personal details
- Born: February 3, 1970 (age 56) Canton, Illinois
- Party: Republican
- Spouse: Andrew Fischer
- Children: 3
- Education: University of Northern Iowa
- Profession: Mediation and Conflict Coaching
- Website: https://kathleenkauth.com

Kathleen Kauth is a member of the Nebraska Legislature from Omaha, Nebraska in District 31 who was appointed by Governor Pete Ricketts on June 7, 2022, to fill the seat of former Senator Rich Pahls who died on April 27, 2022. She then won the vote in the midterm election of 2022 to continue as state senator of Nebraska's District 31. In 2024, Kauth won the general election by a higher margin than the last election to continue serving in the legislature for another 4 years.

Kauth is the founder of K.T. Beck Enterprises, LLC, which is described as a mediation and conflict coaching firm. She moved to Omaha with her husband and three boys in 2012. Kauth has also served on the State of Nebraska’s Aging Advisory Committee and is currently on the Omaha City Charter Commission. She has been a member of the Eastern Nebraska Office on Aging (ENOA) Foster Grandparents Advisory Board since 2017.

== Electoral history ==
Nebraska's 31st Legislative District Special Election, 2022
Party	Candidate	Votes	%
Republican	Kathleen Kauth (incumbent)	8,076	52.50
Democratic	Tim Royers	7,306	47.50
Total votes		15,382	100.00
Republican hold			

=== Results ===
Nebraska's 31st Legislative District Election, 2024
Primary election
Party	Candidate	Votes	%
Republican	Kathleen Kauth (incumbent)	4,680	59.13
Democratic	Mary Ann Folchert	3,235	40.87
Total votes		7,915	100.00
General election
Republican	Kathleen Kauth (incumbent)	10,664	54.06
Democratic	Mary Ann Folchert	9,064	45.94
Total votes		19,728	100.00
Republican hold			

== Nebraska State Legislature ==
As of 2025, Kauth serves as the Chairperson on the Business and Labor Committee, member of the Agriculture Committee, and a member of the Revenue Committee.

=== Political positions and bills introduced ===
==== LGBTQIA+ ====
During her tenure as senator, Kauth has sponsored LB574, which "would forbid gender-affirming care such as puberty blockers, hormone therapy and surgeries for those under 19."

In the 109th Session of the Nebraska Legislature (starting in January 2025) Kauth introduced the Legislative Bill 89, Adopt the Stand with Women Act. The bill focused on students in kindergarten through twelfth grade, and postsecondary institutions and sought to define "male" and "female" in sports. By looking to define the two sexes in sports, the bill would also dictate which bathrooms and lockers rooms students would be required to use based on their biological sex.

Governor Jim Pillen openly supported the bill while drawing immense criticism from Pro-LGBTQ+ Nebraskans, associations, and senators.

==== Guns Rights ====
Kauth supports the Second Amendment and supports citizen's rights to bear arms.

==== Mandatory Masks ====
Kauth supports an individuals right to choose whether or not to wear a mask in public and introduced Legislative Bill 421 (LB421), Provide Procedures for Directed Health Measures. The bill, which was indefinitely postponed in April 2024, would have required approval from a city council or county board to enact a mask mandate.

==== Abortion Rights ====
Kauth is pro-life and against abortions.

==== Marijuana ====
Kauth is against legalizing recreational marijuana and sought to redefine what constitutes hemp versus marijuana with Legislative Bill (LB 316), Prohibit Conduct Relating to Hemp other than Cannabidiol Products and Change Provisions of the Nebraska Hemp Farming Act and the Uniform Controlled Substances Act.
