= Stan Clouse =

Nebraskan state senator

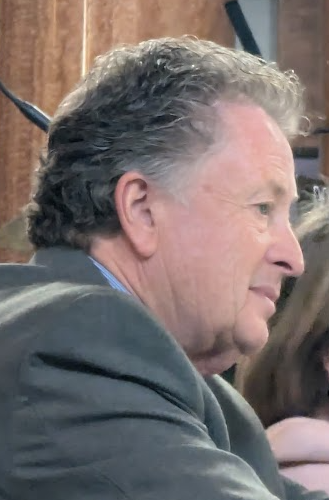

Member of the Nebraska Legislature from the 37th district
- Incumbent
- Assumed office January 8, 2025
- Preceded by: John Lowe

Personal details
- Party: Republican

Stanley Clouse (born December 4, 1956) is an American politician from Kearney, Nebraska, who has served in the Nebraska Legislature representing the 37th district since 2025.

== Personal life ==
Clouse was born and raised in Nebraska, graduating from Brady Public Schools in 1975. In 1996, he attended Mid-Plains Community College, which has several locations across the state of Nebraska, and graduated with an associate degree. When elected to the Nebraska State Legislature, Clouse was retired, having been the Mayor for Kearney, Nebraska from 2006 to 2024.

Clouse has been, and still is, a member of many organizations and societies across Nebraska. Some of his current memberships are with the Kearney Area Chamber of Commerce, Gibbon Chamber of Commerce, Economic Development Council of Buffalo County, University of Nebraska Medical Center Nursing Advisory Council, League of Nebraska Municipalities Legislative Committee, Mid-America Woodcarvers Association and New Life Church.

In the past, Clouse has also been a member of Kearney City Council, Nebraska Department of Labor, Nebraska Natural Resources Commission, North Platte Planning Commission, board, Make-A-Wish Foundation of Nebraska, and the Governor’s Task Force on Human Trafficking.

Clouse is married to LaVon Cole and has two children.

== Nebraska State Legislature ==
As of 2025, Stan Clouse serves as the Vice Chairperson on the Urban Affairs Committee, along with being a member on the General Affairs Committee, Natural Resources, Streamlined Sales and Use Tax System, and Rural Broadband Task Force.

District 37 of Nebraska's Legislative District includes Nebraska’s fourth largest city, Kearney, Nebraska, along with small towns Gibbon, Nebraska and Shelton, Nebraska. District 37 is a portion of Buffalo County, Nebraska.

Per Vote Smart, Clouse “did not provide voters with positions on key issues covered by the 2024 Political Courage Test, despite repeated requests from Vote Smart and voters like you.”

=== LGBTQA+ ===
Clouse is against allowing gender affirming surgery for minors. He is also against trans students playing in boy/girls sports that do not match with gender assigned at birth.

=== Abortion Rights ===
Clouse is against expanding abortion rights. He also voted for Legislative Bill (LB) 632, Require a health care facility to dispose of the remains of aborted unborn children, which requires medical providers to bury or cremate any remains from an elective abortion.

=== Gambling ===
Clouse is for online gambling.

=== Marijuana ===
Clouse is against marijuana.

=== School Choice and Education ===
Clouse is for school choice.

Clouse voted to pass Legislative Bill (LB) 140, Require school policies relating to use of electronic communication devices by students. The bill allows school districts to prohibit use of cell phones in K-12 schools.

=== Government Assistance Programs ===
In January 2025, Clouse introduced Legislative Bill (LB) 354, Prohibit cities of the first class from receiving state aid from the Municipal Equalization Fund. The bill did not pass.

=== Healthcare ===
In May 2025, Legislative Bill (LB) 287, Provide for regulation of housing authorities by ordinance, change provisions relating to sanitary and improvement districts, and provide requirements relating to bed bugs under the Nebraska Housing Agency Act, was introduced by the Urban Affairs Committee to combat the rising number of bed bug cases in Omaha. Clouse initially voted for the bill, which did pass, before being vetoed by Governor Pillen. Clouse was one of ten senators that switched votes to override the veto and the bill failed.

=== Infrastructure ===
Clouse voted to pass Legislative Bill (LB) 526, Provide powers and duties for public power districts related to cryptocurrency mining operations. The bill, passed in Summer 2025, allows Nebraska public power organizations to “require direct payment or a letter of credit from cryptocurrency mining operations for the cost of significant infrastructure upgrades.”

Clouse was one of twenty-seven senators that voted to repeal daylight savings time.

=== Workers Rights ===
Clouse voted for passage of Legislative Bill (LB) 415, Exempts Small Businesses, Minors, and Temporary Agriculture Workers from Receiving Paid Sick Leave.
