= Steve Erdman =

American politician

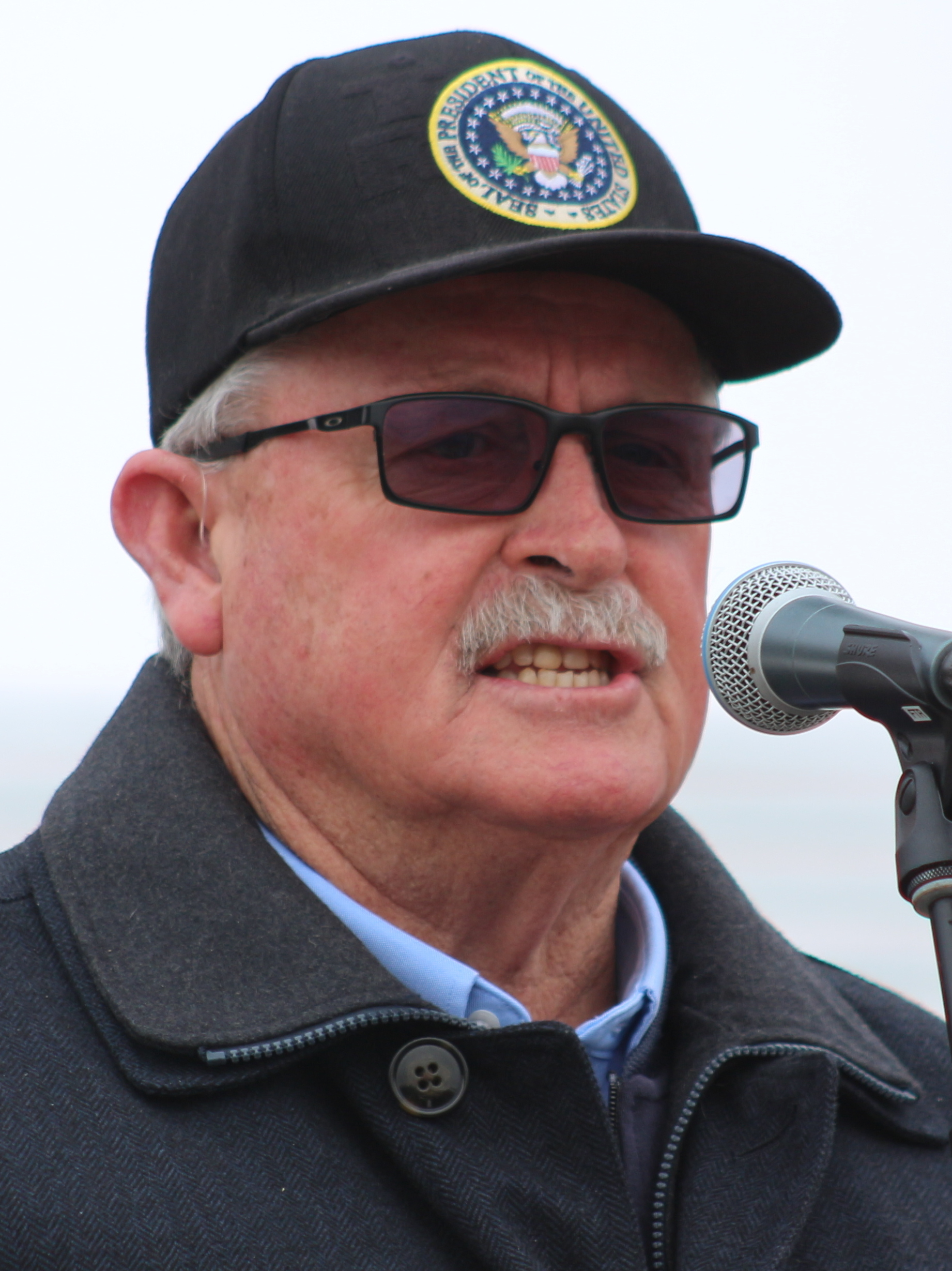

Member of the Nebraska Legislature from the 47th district
- In office January 4, 2017 – January 8, 2025
- Preceded by: Ken Schilz
- Succeeded by: Paul Strommen

Personal details
- Born: November 21, 1949 (age 76) Scottsbluff, Nebraska, U.S.
- Party: Republican
- Children: 3 (including Philip)

Steve Erdman (born November 21, 1949) is an American politician who served in the Nebraska Legislature representing the 47th district from 2017 to 2025.

== Politics ==
In 2016, Erdman was elected to the Nebraska Legislature against Karl Elmshaeuser, the CEO of an aviation company, with roughly two thirds of the vote. He was sworn in on January 4, 2017. In 2020, he easily won a second term as he was uncontested. He cannot seek a third term due to term limits.

=== Education ===
As a state senator, Erdman has been particularly critical of education policy. In February 2017, he proposed a bill that would remove funding from the Nebraska Master Teacher program. In this, Erdman has frequently been allied with state senator Steve Halloran. Along with Halloran, in April 2017 Erdman was one of three senators that opposed new rules requiring Nebraska schools to expand accommodation to students with children including breastfeeding accommodations. In August 2017, the University of Nebraska–Lincoln (NU) became embroiled in a controversy when a graduate student and an undergraduate student entered into a political argument related to the undergraduate's involvement in Turning Point USA, a conservative education advocacy organization. After a video of the event was released, Erdman, Halloran, and state senator Tom Brewer were outspoken in criticism of the grad student and NU that it was hostile to conservative viewpoints. A group of 70 NU faculty accused the senators and Nebraska governor Pete Ricketts of being politically motivated in their criticism and seeking to damage the university. The graduate student lost funding as a result of the dispute, a move that was heavily criticized by AAUP, the faculty Union. The senators proposed a bill that would restrict the ability of the university to govern itself with regards to speech issues. The Senators also called for an outside agency to study campus attitudes towards conservatives. The university suggested using Gallup for this study, but the senators felt that Gallup could not be unbiased and insisted that the Foundation for Individual Rights in Education (FIRE) be used instead. FIRE would determine the graduate student was within her rights and should not have lost her position. The senators fight with the University continued for much of 2018. In March, they proposed an amendment to strip $17 million of funding from NU, which ultimately failed.

=== Abortion ===
Erdman opposes legal abortion. He argues that restricting abortion is needed to create more native-born people to fill job vacancies in Nebraska, saying "our state population has not grown except by those foreigners who have moved here or refugees who have been placed here."

=== Other ===
Outside of education, Erdman is an outspoken advocate of his views. He opposed increasing tipped workers minimum wage in March 2019. In July 2020, during the COVID-19 pandemic, he gave a speech in Nebraska Legislature in which he urged people not to wear masks, championed the unproven treatment of using hydroxychloroquine to combat the virus, and cast doubt on there ever being a vaccine. Erdman's speech was condemned by both Democrats and Republicans in the legislature. In October 2021, he called for a law opposing vaccine mandates during the COVID-19 pandemic.
