= John Lowe (Nebraska politician) =

American politician (born 1959)

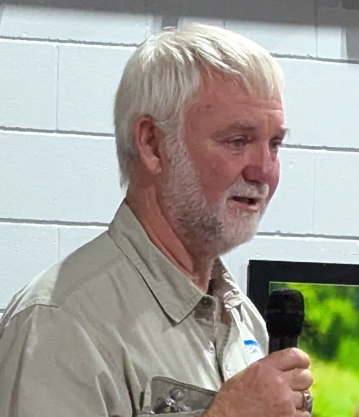

Member of the Nebraska Legislature from the 37th district
- In office January 4, 2017 – January 8, 2025
- Preceded by: Galen Hadley
- Succeeded by: Stan Clouse

Personal details
- Born: September 16, 1959 (age 67) Kearney, Nebraska, U.S.
- Party: Republican
- Spouse: Kim
- Children: 3
- Education: Kearney State College (BA)

John S. Lowe (born September 16, 1959) is an American politician who served as a member of the Nebraska Legislature from the 37th district. Elected in November 2016, he assumed office on January 4, 2017, and served until January 8, 2025.

== Early life and education ==
Lowe was born in Kearney, Nebraska. He graduated from Kearney High School in 1978 and earned a bachelor's degree from Kearney State College in 1982.

== Career ==
Outside of politics, Lowe works as a real estate agent, specializing in commercial and farm properties. He was elected to the Nebraska Legislature in November 2016 and assumed office on January 4, 2017.
