= Rob Dover =

American politician

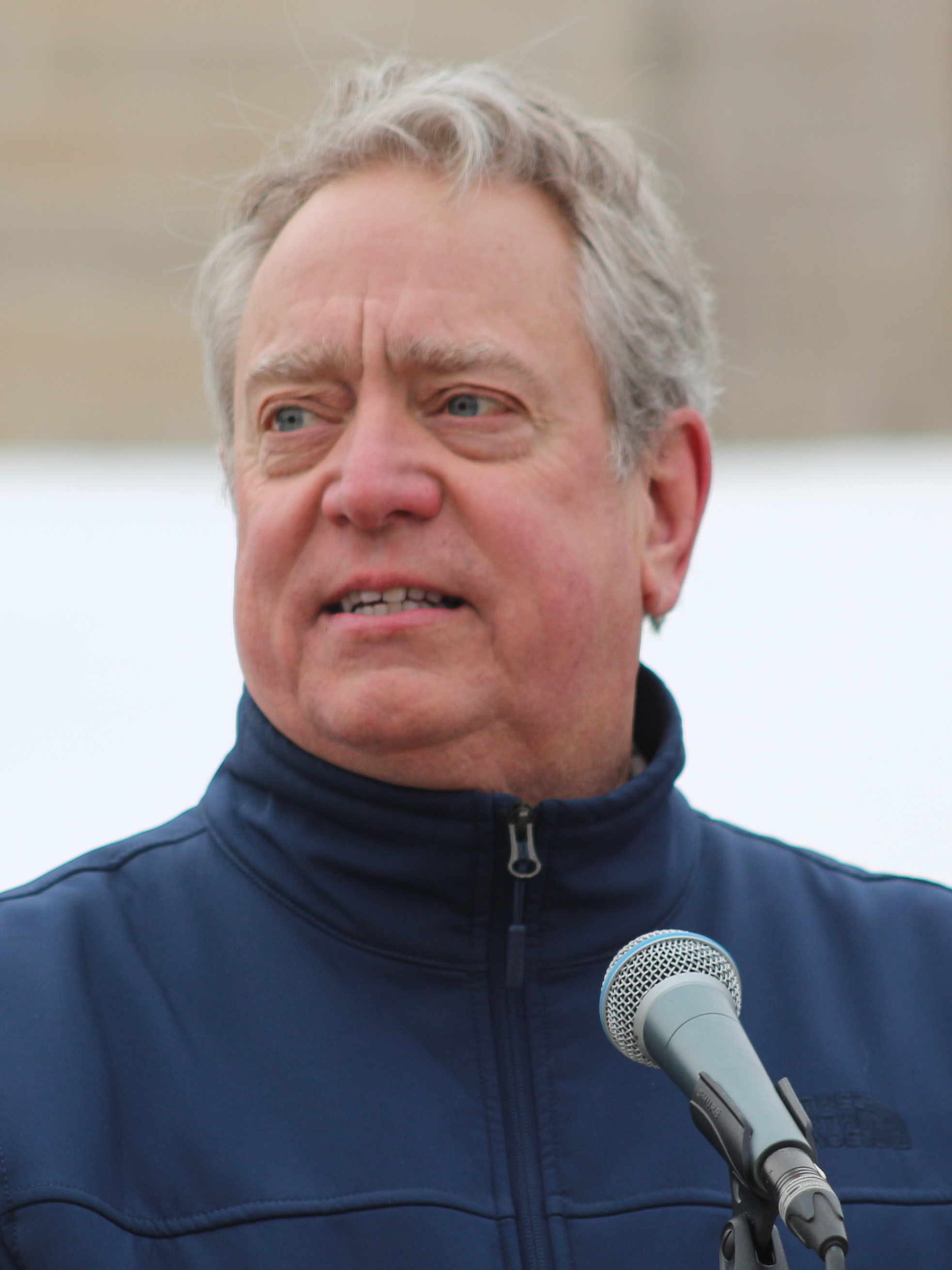

Member of the Nebraska Legislature from the 19th district
- Incumbent
- Assumed office July 22, 2022
- Preceded by: Mike Flood

Personal details
- Born: December 21, 1958 (age 67) Norfolk, Nebraska
- Party: Republican
- Spouse: Ann Dover
- Children: 4
- Education: Wayne State College
- Profession: Real Estate Agent

Robert Dover (born December 21, 1958) is a member of the Nebraska Legislature from Norfolk, Nebraska for District 19. He was appointed by Governor Pete Ricketts on July 22, 2022, to fill the seat of former Senator Mike Flood who resigned after being elected to the United States House of Representatives.

== Personal life ==
Dover was born and raised in Norfolk, Nebraska where he graduated high school in 1977. He then went on to earn a double Bachelors degrees in Business & Finance and Spanish from Wayne State College in 1988. He married his wife, Ann, in August 1993 and they have four children together. Dover works in real estate.

He is a member of the Nebraska Chamber of Commerce, Joint Economic Development Initiative, Norfolk Chamber of Commerce, Century, Boy Scouts of America, Nebraska Realtors Association and the National Association of Realtors.

He is a former commissioner for Nebraska real estate, former member of the Lutheran High Northeast Capital Campaign, and has sat as a member on several fundraisers and campaigns.

== Nebraska State Legislature ==
As of 2025, Dover is a member of the Appropriations Committee along with Statewide Tourism And Recreational Water Access and Resource Sustainability (LB406).

District 19 of Nebraska's Legislative District covers all of Madison County, Nebraska and the southern half of Pierce County, Nebraska.

=== LGBTQIA+ ===
Dover is against allowing gender-affirming care for minors. He is also against trans students playing in boy/girls sports that do not match with gender assigned at birth. Dover was a co-sponsor of Legislative Bill (LB89) in the 2025 session, also known as The Stand with Women Act.

=== Abortion Rights ===
Dover is against abortion.

=== School Choice and Education ===
Dover supports school choice.

=== Marijuana ===
Dover is against Nebraska having legalized marijuana.

=== Internet and Technology ===
In the 2025 session, Dover co-sponsored Legislative Bill (LB383), Adopt the Parental Rights in Social Media Act, rename the Child Pornography Prevention Act, and prohibit conduct involving computer-generated child pornography. The bill would require pornography websites to verify online users are 18 years of age or older.

=== Infrastructure ===
In the 2024 session, Dover introduced Legislative Resolution 417 (LR417), Interim study to provide a comprehensive examination of the funding structure of Nebraska's transportation system and to identify strategies to fund highway maintenance and construction. Over two dozen senators signed on in support of the Resolution however, it did not make it out of Referral status.

In the 2025 session, Dover introduced Legislative Resolution 260 (LR260), Interim study to determine the return on investment per kilowatt hour for businesses that choose to locate and set up their businesses in Nebraska. The Resolution would create a short term study to “determine the return on investment per kilowatt hour for businesses that choose to locate and set up their businesses in Nebraska.” As of November 2025, the Resolution is still in Referral Status, with two hearings canceled in October 2025.

=== Government & Politics ===
In both the 2023 session and 2024 session, Dover introduced Legislative Resolutions-Constitutional Amendments to allow Nebraska state senators to serve three consecutive terms, instead of the two. The 2023 resolution (LR22CA) was indefinitely postponed and the 2024 resolution (LR19CA) was Presented to the Secretary of State.
