= Robert Hallstrom =

Nebraskan state senator

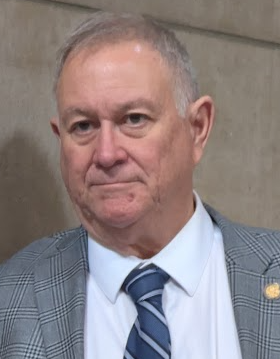

Member of the Nebraska Legislature from the 1st district
- Incumbent
- Assumed office January 8, 2025
- Preceded by: Julie Slama

Personal details
- Born: December 2, 1955 (age 70) Syracuse, Nebraska
- Party: Republican
- Spouse: LuRae Hallstrom
- Children: 4

Robert Hallstrom (born December 2, 1955) is an American politician from Syracuse, Nebraska, who has served in the Nebraska Legislature representing the 1st district since 2025.
