= List of Nebraska state senators =

List of senators who have served the Nebraska Legislature

This is a list of all senators who have served in the Nebraska Legislature since it became a unicameral body in 1937.

Legislative districts for elections from 1936 to 1962.

Legislative districts for the 1964 election only. The districts were renumbered from the pre-1964 apportionment.

Legislative districts for the 1966, 1968, and 1970 elections after the 1966 reapportionment.

Legislative districts after the 1971 redistricting. Used for elections from 1972 to 1980.

Records show that the apportionment of the legislative districts established for the 1936 election remained unchanged through the election of 1962. The boundaries of these districts were restricted to fall along county lines. In the election of 1962, the voters of Nebraska passed a measure to loosen the county-line boundary restriction and to increase the number of legislative districts from 43 to 49. This resulted in a new apportionment that renumbered all the existing districts and added two additional districts to Lancaster County, three additional districts to Douglas County, and one north of Douglas county. That plan went into effect for the election of 1964.

However, on June 15, 1964, the United States Supreme Court handed down Reynolds v. Sims, which held that state senate districts must be roughly equal in population. One month later, the U.S. District Court for the District of Nebraska in League of Nebraska Municipalities v. Marsh held that the portion of the 1962 amendment to the Nebraska Constitution allowing the legislature to give consideration to area when redistricting was unconstitutional. This meant that the legislature had to once again redraw the district boundaries in 1965 based solely on population. In July 1965, the legislature approved a plan with newly apportioned districts which was upheld by the Nebraska Supreme Court in January 1966 and went into effect for the election of 1966. After 1966, the Nebraska Legislature conducts a process of redistricting every ten years after the decennial United States Census.

After its inception in 1937, members of the unicameral Nebraska legislature served for a term of two years, and all state legislative districts were up for reelection in every biennial election. However, another change adopted by the voters of Nebraska in the 1962 election was to increase the term of state senators from two to four years, and to stagger the election of state senators so that roughly half of the districts were up for election every two years. The election of 1964 was the last election in which all legislative districts were up for election at the same time. Odd-numbered districts elected senators to four-year terms, such that odd-numbered-district elections would coincide with United States presidential elections. Even-numbered districts elected senators in 1964 to two-year terms, such that even-numbered-district senators would be up for election again in 1966, in which they would be elected to four-year terms such that even-numbered-district elections would coincide with United States midterm elections.

Even though the Nebraska Legislature, as a nonpartisan body, officially recognizes no party affiliations, the party affiliations of individual members are still noted below when known for reference.

== District 1 ==
In the pre-1964 apportionment, what is now District 1 was also called District 1, and it consisted of the counties of Johnson, Pawnee, and Richardson. In 1964, the district was expanded to include Nemaha. The district's boundaries were then changed in the 1966 reapportionment to exclude Pawnee County, but in the 1971 redistricting, Pawnee County was regained, as well as the southeastern corner of Gage County, but Johnson was excluded. From 1980 to 2010, the district grew in size to encompass parts of Johnson and Otoe counties, and in the ten years after the 1991 redistricting, it even included the southern third of Gage County.

Today, District 1 covers Otoe, Johnson, Nemaha, Pawnee, and Richardson counties.

Name	Years Elected (Appointed)	Party	Residence	Notes
Charles Dafoe	1936	Dem	Tecumseh	
Joseph C. Reavis	1938	Rep	Falls City	
Otto Kotouc Jr.	1940	Dem	Humboldt	Son of Otto Kotouc Sr.
Joseph C. Reavis	1942, 1944	Rep	Falls City	
Harold Prichard	1946	Dem	Falls City	
Charles Vogt Jr.	1948	Rep	Liberty	
Otto Kotouc Sr.	1950, 1952, 1954, 1956	Dem	Humboldt	Father of Otto Kotouc Jr.
John Cooper	1958	Rep	Humboldt	Brother of Calista Cooper Hughes
Lloyd Stalder	1960, 1962	Dem	Humboldt	
Calista Cooper Hughes	1964	Rep	Humboldt	Sister of John Cooper
Irving Wiltse	1968, 1972	Rep	Falls City	
Nelson Merz	1976	Dem	Falls City	
R. Wiley Remmers	1980, 1984	Rep	Auburn	
Spencer Morrissey	1988	Dem	Tecumseh	
Floyd Vrtiska	1992, 1996, 2000	Rep	Table Rock	
Lavon Heidemann	2004, 2008	Rep	Elk Creek	Lieutenant Governor (2013–2014)
Dan Watermeier	2012, 2016	Rep	Syracuse	Nebraska Public Service Commissioner (2019–present)
Julie Slama	(2019), 2020	Rep	Peru/Dunbar	Appointed by Governor Pete Ricketts; wife of Andrew La Grone
Robert Hallstrom	2024	Rep	Syracuse	

== District 2 ==
In the pre-1964 apportionment, what is now District 2 was also called District 2, and it consisted of the counties of Otoe and Nemaha. In 1964, the district was changed to consist of Otoe and Cass counties, and in the 1966 reapportionment it was changed yet again to only include the eastern half of Otoe and Cass counties. In the 1971 redistricting, District 2 was expanded to include more of Otoe and Cass counties and added most of Johnson County. In the 1981 redistricting, Johnson county was shifted back to District 1, and District 2 was drawn to include all of Cass County and the northern half of Otoe county. For the 1991, 2001, and 2011 redistrictings, District 2 continued to shrink in size by including less and less of Otoe County.

Today, District 2 consists of only Cass County and a small portion of eastern Lancaster County.

Name	Years Elected (Appointed)	Party	Residence	Notes
Robert M. Armstrong	1936	Rep	Auburn	
Frank Sorrell	1938, 1940, 1942, 1944	Dem	Syracuse	
John McKnight	1946, 1948, 1950	Rep	Auburn	
Floyd Pohlman	(1952)	Rep	Auburn	Appointed by Governor Val Peterson
John Aufenkamp	1952, 1954, 1956, 1958	Rep	Julian	
William Brandt	1960, 1962	Rep	Unadilla	
Rick Budd	1964, 1966	Rep	Nebraska City	
Jack Mullen	(1970)	Rep	Nebraska City	Appointed by Governor Norbert Tiemann
Calvin Carsten	1970, 1974, 1978, 1982	Rep	Avoca	Son of Fred Carsten
Roger Wehrbein	1986, 1990, 1994, 1998, 2002	Rep	Plattsmouth	
Dave Pankonin	2006, 2010	Rep	Louisville	
Paul Lambert	(2011)	Rep	Plattsmouth	Appointed by Governor Dave Heineman
Bill Kintner	2012, 2014	Rep	Papillion	
Robert Clements	(2017), 2018, 2022	Rep	Elmwood	Appointed by Governor Pete Ricketts

== District 3 ==
In the pre-1964 apportionment, what is now District 3 was also called District 3, and it consisted of the entirety of Sarpy County. This remained the same in the 1964 reapportionment, but after the 1966 reapportionment, it was reduced to only include a portion of Sarpy County, which continued to be readjusted for population in subsequent redistrictings.

Today, District 3 still consists of a portion of Sarpy County.

Name	Years Elected (Appointed)	Party	Residence	Notes
Fred Carsten	1936, 1938	Rep	Avoca	Father of Calvin Carsten; Listed as a Democrat in the 1937 legislature but as a Republican in the 1939 legislature
William A. Metzger	1940	Dem	Cedar Creek	Son of Christian Metzger
Tom Dooley	1942, 1944	Dem	Papillion	
William A. Metzger	1946, 1948	Dem	Cedar Creek	Son of Christian Metzger
Christian Metzger	1950	Dem	Cedar Creek	Father of William A. Metzger
Tom Dooley	1952	Dem	Papillion	
William A. Metzger	1954	Dem	Cedar Creek	Son of Christian E. Metzger
Tom Dooley	1956	Dem	Papillion	
Edwin McHugh	1958, 1960	Rep	Murdock	
Dale Payne	1962, 1964	Rep	Bellevue/Papillion	
Orval Keyes	1968, 1972, 1976	Dem	Springfield	Elected as a Republican in 1968 and 1972 but switched to the Democratic Party in 1973
Emil Beyer	1980, 1984, 1988	Rep	Gretna	
Michael T. Avery	1992	Dem	Gretna	
Jon Bruning	1996, 2000	Rep	Gretna	Nebraska Attorney General (2003–2015)
Ray Mossey	(2002)	Rep	Papillion/Bellevue	Appointed by Governor Mike Johanns
Gail Kopplin	2004	Dem	Gretna	
Scott Price	2008, 2012	Rep	Bellevue	
Tommy Garrett	(2013), 2014	Rep	Bellevue	Appointed by Governor Dave Heineman
Carol Blood	2016, 2020	Dem	Bellevue	
Victor Rountree	2024	Dem	Bellevue	

== District 4 ==
In the pre-1964 apportionment, what is now District 4 was called District 9, and it included a section of Douglas County.

Today, District 4 still consists of a section of Douglas County, which has been readjusted for population in subsequent redistrictings.

Name	Years Elected (Appointed)	Party	Residence	Notes
Amos Thomas	1936, 1938, 1940	Rep	Omaha	
Sidney Cullingham	1942, 1944	Rep	Omaha	Stepson of Robert B. Howell
Karl Vogel	1946, 1948, 1950, 1952, 1954, 1956, 1958	Rep	Omaha	
Michael Russillo	(1959), 1960, 1962	Rep	Omaha	Appointed by Governor Victor Anderson
Henry Pedersen Jr.	1964, 1966	Rep	Omaha	
P. J. Morgan	1970	Rep	Omaha	Mayor of Omaha (1989–1994)
Richard Fellman	(1973)	Dem	Omaha	Appointed by Governor J. James Exon
Larry Stoney	1974, 1978	Rep	Omaha	
Gary Hannibal	1982, 1986	Rep	Omaha	
Thomas Horgan	1990	Dem	Omaha	
James Monen	(1994)	Dem	Omaha	Appointed by Governor Ben Nelson
Kermit Brashear	1994, 1998, 2002	Rep	Omaha	Speaker (2005–2006)
Pete Pirsch	2006, 2010	Rep	Omaha	Son of Carol McBride Pirsch
Robert Hilkemann	2014, 2018	Rep	Omaha	
Brad von Gillern	2022	Rep	Elkhorn	

== District 5 ==
In the pre-1964 apportionment, what is now District 5 was called District 8, and it included a section of Douglas County.

Today, District 5 still consists of a section of Douglas County, which has been readjusted for population in subsequent redistrictings.

Name	Years Elected (Appointed)	Party	Residence	Notes
P. J. McMahon	1936	Dem	Omaha	
Peter Gutoski	1938	Dem	Omaha	
George Bevins	1940	Dem	Omaha	
Peter Gutoski	1942	Dem	Omaha	
James Anthony Ryan	1944		Omaha	
George Bevins	1946	Dem	Omaha	
Jack Larkin Jr.	1948, 1950, 1952, 1954	Rep	Omaha	
John P. Munnelly	1956, 1958, 1960	Dem	Omaha	
Eugene T. Mahoney	(1961), 1962, 1964, 1968, 1972	Dem	Omaha	Controversially appointed by Lt. Governor Dwight Burney; initially appointed as a Republican, but switched to the Democratic Party in 1969
Bernice Labedz	(1976), 1976, 1980, 1984, 1988	Dem	Omaha	Appointed by Governor J. James Exon
Don Preister	1992, 1996, 2000, 2004	Dem	Omaha/Bellevue	
Heath Mello	2008, 2012	Dem	Omaha	
Mike McDonnell	2016, 2020	Rep	Omaha	Elected as a Democrat in 2016 and 2020 but switched to the Republican Party in 2024
Margo Juarez	2024	Dem	Omaha	

== District 6 ==
What is now called District 6 was created when the legislature expanded from 43 to 49 districts in 1964, and it consisted of a portion of Douglas County.

Today, District 6 still consists of a portion of Douglas County, which has been readjusted for population in subsequent redistrictings.

Name	Years Elected (Appointed)	Party	Residence	Notes
Harold Moylan	1964, 1966, 1970, 1974	Dem	Omaha	Husband of Margaret Moylan
Margaret Moylan	(1978)	Dem	Omaha	Appointed by Governor J. James Exon; Wife of Harold Moylan
Peter Hoagland	1978, 1982	Dem	Omaha	U.S. Representative (1989–1995)
Brad Ashford	1986, 1990	Rep	Omaha	U.S. Representative (2015–2017); began his first term as a Democrat but switched to Republican in 1988; Later served as a Senator from District 20
Pam Brown	1994, 1998, 2002	Dem	Omaha	
John E. Nelson	2006, 2010	Rep	Omaha	Lieutenant Governor (2014–2015)
Joni Craighead	2014	Rep	Omaha	
Theresa Thibodeau	(2017)	Rep	Omaha	Appointed by Governor Pete Ricketts
Machaela Cavanaugh	2018, 2022	Dem	Omaha	Sister of John Cavanaugh, daughter of John J. Cavanaugh III

== District 7 ==
In the pre-1964 apportionment, what is now District 7 was also called District 7, and it included of a section of Douglas County.

Today, District 7 still consists of a section of Douglas County, which has been readjusted for population in subsequent redistrictings.

Name	Years Elected (Appointed)	Party	Residence	Notes
Charles Tvrdik	1936, 1938, 1940, 1942, 1944, 1946, 1948, 1950, 1952, 1954, 1956	Dem	Omaha	Speaker (1953–1954)
William Skarda	1958, 1960, 1962, 1964, 1968, 1972	Dem	Omaha	
Patrick Venditte	1976	Dem	Omaha	
Karen Kilgarin	1980	Dem	Omaha	
Tim Hall	(1984), 1984, 1988, 1992	Dem	Omaha	Appointed by Governor Bob Kerrey
John Hilgert	(1995), 1996, 2000	Dem	Omaha	Appointed by Governor Ben Nelson
John Synowiecki	(2002), 2002, 2004	Dem	Omaha	Appointed by Governor Mike Johanns
Jeremy Nordquist	2008, 2012	Dem	Omaha	
Nicole Fox	(2015)	Rep	Omaha	Appointed by Governor Pete Ricketts
Tony Vargas	2016, 2020	Dem	Omaha	
Dunixi Guereca	2024	Dem	Omaha	

== District 8 ==
In the pre-1964 apportionment, what is now District 8 was called District 10, and it included a section of Douglas County.

Today, District 8 still consists of a section of Douglas County, which has been readjusted for population in subsequent redistrictings.

Name	Years Elected (Appointed)	Party	Residence	Notes
Ernest Adams	1936, 1938, 1940	Rep	Omaha	
Clifford Ogden	1942, 1944	Rep	Omaha	
Henry Kosman	1946, 1948	Rep	Omaha	
Clifford Ogden	(1949)	Rep	Omaha	Appointed by Governor Val Peterson
Bill Moulton	1950, 1952, 1954, 1956, 1958, 1960, 1962	Rep	Omaha	Speaker (1963–1964)
Pat Moulton	1964, 1966	Rep	Omaha	
Donald Troudt	(1970)	Rep	Omaha	Appointed by Governor Norbert Tiemann
David Stahmer	1970	Dem	Omaha	
Warren Swigart	1974	Rep	Omaha	
Edwin Dvorak	(1977)	Dem	Omaha	Appointed by Governor J. James Exon
Vard Johnson	1978, 1982, 1986	Dem	Omaha	Elected as a Republican in 1978 and 1982 but switched to the Democratic Party in 1983
Sharon Beck	(1989)	Rep	Omaha	Appointed by Governor Kay Orr
Eric J. Will	1990, 1994	Dem	Omaha	
Patrick Bourne	1998, 2002	Dem	Omaha	
Tom White	2006	Dem	Omaha	
Burke Harr	2010, 2014	Dem	Omaha	
Megan Hunt	2018, 2022	Ind	Omaha	Elected in 2018 and 2022 as a Democrat but switched to nonpartisan in 2023

== District 9 ==
In the pre-1964 apportionment, what is now District 9 was called District 6, and it included a section of Douglas County.

Today, District 9 still consists of a section of Douglas County, which has been readjusted for population in subsequent redistrictings.

Name	Years Elected (Appointed)	Party	Residence	Notes
William Worthing	1936	Dem	Omaha	
Sam Klaver	1938	Rep	Omaha	
George Sullivan	1940	Dem	Omaha	
Sam Klaver	1942, 1944	Rep	Omaha	
Joseph Benesch	1946, 1948	Dem	Omaha	
Sam Klaver	1950, 1952, 1954, 1956, 1958, 1960, 1962, 1964, 1968	Rep	Omaha	
John Cavanaugh	1972	Dem	Omaha	U.S. Representative (1977–1981); father of Machaela Cavanaugh and John Cavanaugh
Bill Brennan	1976	Dem	Omaha	
Ray Powers	(1979)	Dem	Omaha	Appointed by Governor Charles Thone
Marge Higgins	1980, (1980), 1984	Dem	Omaha	Won election in 1980 but was then appointed by Governor Charles Thone after Ray Powers resigned early
John Lindsay	1988, 1992	Dem	Omaha	
Shelley Kiel	1996	Dem	Omaha	
Chip Maxwell	2000	Rep	Omaha	
Gwen Howard	2004, 2008	Dem	Omaha	Mother of Sara Howard
Sara Howard	2012, 2016	Dem	Omaha	Daughter of Gwen Howard
John Cavanaugh	2020, 2024	Dem	Omaha	Brother of Machaela Cavanaugh, son of John J. Cavanaugh III

== District 10 ==
What is now called District 10 was created when the legislature expanded from 43 to 49 districts in 1964, and it consisted of a section of Douglas County.

Today, District 10 still consists of a portion of Douglas County, which has been readjusted for population in subsequent redistrictings.

Name	Years Elected (Appointed)	Party	Residence	Notes
Clifton Batchelder	1964, 1966	Rep	Omaha	Husband of Anne Stuart Batchelder and Son-in-law of R. Douglas Stuart
John Savage	1970, 1974	Rep	Omaha	
Carol McBride Pirsch	1978, 1982, 1986, 1990, 1994	Rep	Omaha	Mother of Pete Pirsch
Deborah Suttle	(1997), 1998	Dem	Omaha	Appointed by Governor Ben Nelson
Mike Friend	2002, 2006	Rep	Omaha	
Bob Krist	(2009), 2010, 2014	Dem	Omaha	Appointed by Governor Dave Heineman; Elected and served most of his term as a Republican before switching to the Democratic party to run for Governor in 2018.
Wendy DeBoer	2018, 2022	Dem	Bennington	

== District 11 ==
In the pre-1964 apportionment, what is now District 11 was called District 5, and it included a section of Douglas County.

Today, District 11 still consists of a section of Douglas County, which has been readjusted for population in subsequent redistrictings.

Name	Years Elected (Appointed)	Party	Residence	Notes
John Adams, Jr.	1936, 1938, 1940	Rep	Omaha	Son of John Adams, Sr.
Harry Adden Foster	1942, 1944, 1946	Rep	Omaha	
John Adams, Sr.	1948, 1950, 1952, 1954, 1956, 1958, 1960	Rep	Omaha	Father of John Adams, Jr.
Edward Ray Danner	1962, 1964, 1968	Dem	Omaha	
George W. Althouse	(1970)	Rep	Omaha	Appointed by Governor Norbert Tiemann
Ernie Chambers	1970, 1972, 1976, 1980, 1984, 1988, 1992, 1996, 2000, 2004	Ind	Omaha	
Brenda Council	2008	Dem	Omaha	
Ernie Chambers	2012, 2016	Ind	Omaha	
Terrell McKinney	2020, 2024	Dem	Omaha	

== District 12 ==
What is now called District 12 was created when the legislature expanded from 43 to 49 districts in 1964, and it consisted of a section of Douglas County.

Today, District 12 still consists of a section of Douglas County, which has been readjusted for population in subsequent redistrictings.

Name	Years Elected (Appointed)	Party	Residence	Notes
Richard Proud	1964, 1966, 1970	Rep	Omaha	Speaker (1973–1974)
Jerry Koch	1974, 1978	Rep	Ralston	
Chris Abboud	1982, 1986, 1990, 1994	Rep	Omaha	
Pam Redfield	1998, (1998), 2002	Rep	Omaha	Won election in 1998 but was then appointed by Governor Ben Nelson after Chris Abboud resigned early
Steve Lathrop	2006, 2010	Dem	Omaha	
Merv Riepe	2014	Rep	Ralston	
Steve Lathrop	2018	Dem	Omaha	
Merv Riepe	2022	Rep	Ralston	

== District 13 ==
In the pre-1964 apportionment, what is now District 13 was called District 4, and it included a section of Douglas County.

Today, District 13 still consists of a section of Douglas County, which has been readjusted for population in subsequent redistrictings.

Name	Years Elected (Appointed)	Party	Residence	Notes
Walter R. Johnson	1936	Rep	Omaha	Nebraska Attorney General
William J. Norman	1938, 1940, 1942, 1944, 1946, 1948	Rep	Omaha	
George Syas	1950, 1952, 1954, 1956, 1958, 1960, 1962, 1964, 1968, 1972	Rep	Omaha	
Dave Newell	1976, 1980	Dem	Omaha	
Dan Lynch	1984, 1988, 1992, 1996	Dem	Omaha	
Lowen Kruse	2000, 2004	Dem	Omaha	
Tanya Cook	2008, 2012	Dem	Omaha	
Justin Wayne	2016, 2020	Dem	Omaha	
Ashlei Spivey	2024	Dem	Omaha	

== District 14 ==
What is now called District 14 was created when the legislature expanded from 43 to 49 districts in 1964. It originally consisted of the counties of Burt and Washington. In the 1966 reapportionment, it was moved completely into Douglas County. As a result of the 1981 redistricting, District 14 was moved completely into Sarpy County.

Today, District 14 consists of a portion of Sarpy County, which has been readjusted for population in subsequent redistrictings.

Name	Years Elected (Appointed)	Party	Residence	Notes
Claire Holmquist	1964	Rep	Oakland	Elected later in District 16 after reapportionment
Moved to Douglas County as part of the 1966 Reapportionment
Florence Reynolds	1966	Rep	Omaha	
Duke Snyder	1970	Rep	Omaha	
Thomas Fitzgerald	1974, 1978	Dem	Omaha	
Walter Duda	(1981)	Rep	Omaha	Appointed by Governor Charles Thone
Tom Doyle	1982	Dem	Omaha	
Ron Withem	(1983), 1984, 1986, 1990, 1994	Dem	Papillion	Speaker (1994–1996); appointed by Governor Bob Kerrey
Nancy Thompson	(1997), 1998, 2002	Dem	La Vista	Appointed by Governor Ben Nelson
Tim Gay	2006	Rep	Papillion	
Jim Smith	2010, 2014	Rep	Papillion	
John Arch	2018, 2022	Rep	La Vista	Speaker (2023–Present)

== District 15 ==
In the pre-1964 apportionment, what is now District 15 was called District 11, and it consisted of the counties of Dodge and Washington. In the 1964 reapportionment, it was reduced to only include Dodge County. In the 1971 redistricting, it was reduced further to only include a southern portion of Dodge County, which included the city of Fremont. District 15 was then increased in subsequent redistrictings to include more of Dodge county until the 2001 redistricting, when it once again included the entirety of Dodge county.

Today, District 15 consists of all of Dodge County and the northwest corner of Douglas County.

Name	Years Elected (Appointed)	Party	Residence	Notes
P. L. Cady	1936	Dem	Fremont	
Richard N. Johnson	1938, 1940	Rep	Fremont	
Earl Jackson Lee	1942, 1944, 1946, 1948, 1950, 1952, 1954	Rep	Fremont	Speaker (1949–1950)
Ray Simmons	1956, 1958	Rep	Fremont	
Ross Rasmussen	1960, 1962, 1964	Dem	Hooper	
E. Thome Johnson	1968, (1968), 1972	Rep	Fremont	Appointed by Governor Norbert Tiemann after he was elected because seat was vacated early
Barry Reutzel	1976	Dem	Fremont	
Lowell Johnson	1980, 1984, 1988	Rep	North Bend	Nebraska Public Service Commissioner (1995–2007)
Ray Janssen	1992, 1996, 2000, 2004	Dem	Nickerson	Uncle of Charlie Janssen
Charlie Janssen	2008, 2012	Rep	Fremont	Nebraska Auditor (2015–2023); nephew of Ray Janssen
Dave Schnoor	(2014)	Rep	Scribner	Appointed by Governor Dave Heineman (in consultation with then-incoming Governor Pete Ricketts)
Lynne Walz	2016, 2020	Dem	Fremont	
Dave Wordekemper	2024	Rep	Fremont	

== District 16 ==
In the pre-1964 apportionment, what is now District 16 was called District 12, and it consisted of the counties of Cuming and Burt. In 1964, District 16 was changed to include Cuming and Colfax counties. In the 1966 reapportionment, District 16 was moved eastward to consist of Thurston, Burt, and Washington counties. In the 1981 redistricting, it picked up a northeast corner of Cuming County, and in the 1991 redistricting, District 16 dropped Thurston County and expanded to include the majority of Cuming County. In the 2001 redistricting, it lost the south half of Washington County, regained Thurston County, and added the rest of Cuming County and all of Stanton County. In the 2011 redistricting, District 16 lost Thurston and Stanton counties and was made to consist of only the entirety of Cuming, Burt, and Washington counties.

Today, District 16 consists of all of Cuming, Burt, and Washington counties as well as the eastern half of Stanton County.

Name	Years Elected (Appointed)	Party	Residence	Notes
Emil Von Seggern	1936, 1938	Dem	West Point	
George Weborg	1940, 1942, 1944, 1946, 1948	Rep	Pender	
John Beaver	1950, 1952, 1954, 1956	Rep	Beemer	Speaker (1957–1958)
Oliver Olinger	1958	Dem	Tekamah	
William Hasebroock	1960, 1962, 1964	Rep	West Point	Elected later in District 18 after reapportionment
Moved to Thurston, Burt, and Washington Counties as part of the 1966 Reapportionment
Claire Holmquist	1966, 1970	Rep	Oakland	Elected previously from District 14
Blair Richendifer	(1972), 1972	Dem	Walthill	Appointed by Governor J. James Exon
Walter George	1974, 1978	Rep	Blair	
James Goll	(1981), 1982	Rep	Tekamah	Appointed by Governor Charles Thone
Frank Korshoj	1986	Dem	Herman	
Bud Robinson	1990, 1994	Rep	Blair	
Matt Connealy	1998, 2002	Dem	Decatur	
Kent Rogert	2006	Dem	Tekamah	
Lydia Brasch	2010, 2014	Rep	Bancroft	
Ben Hansen	2018, 2022	Rep	Blair	

== District 17 ==
In the pre-1964 apportionment, what is now District 17 was called District 13, and it consisted of the counties of Dixon, Dakota, and Thurston. In the 1964 reapportionment, the district boundaries remained unchanged. In the 1966 reapportionment, District 17 lost Thurston County but gained Wayne County. In the 1971 redistricting, District 17 only lost a small northwest corner of Wayne County, and in 1981, it lost a little more area in that same corner. In the 1991 redistricting, District 17 was reorganized to include only a small eastern portion of Dixon County, the eastern half of Wayne County, a northern portion of Cuming County, and all of Dakota and Thurston Counties. In the 2001 redistricting, District 17 retained all of Dakota county and gained back all of Dixon and Wayne counties, but it lost Thurston County and its portions of Cuming County. As a result of the 2011 redistricting, it lost all of Dixon county and regained all of Thurston county.

Today, District 17 consists of a southern portion of Dixon county and all of Wayne, Dakota, and Thurston counties.

Name	Years Elected (Appointed)	Party	Residence	Notes
L. C. Nuernberger	1936	Rep	Wakefield	
J. B. Rossiter	1938	Dem	Walthill	
Louis Jeppesen	1940, 1942	Rep	Hubbard	
Roy Carlberg	1944, 1946	Rep	Pender	
Hal Bridenbaugh	1948, 1950, 1952, 1954, 1956, 1958, 1960, 1962	Rep	Dakota City	
Elmer Wallwey	1964, 1968	Dem	Emerson	
LeRoy Pfister	(1971)	Dem	South Sioux City	Appointed by Governor J. James Exon
John Murphy	1972, 1976	Rep	South Sioux City	
Merle Von Minden	1980	Rep	Allen	
Gerald Conway	1984, 1988	Rep	Wayne	
Kurt Hohenstein	1992	Rep	Dakota City	
L. Patrick Engel	(1993), 1994, 1996, 2000, 2004	Rep	South Sioux City	Appointed by Governor Ben Nelson; first elected as a Democrat but later switched to the Republican Party
Robert Giese	2008	Dem	South Sioux City	
Dave Bloomfield	(2010), 2012	Rep	Hoskins	Appointed by Governor Dave Heineman
Joni Albrecht	2016, 2020	Rep	Thurston	
Glen Meyer	2024	Rep	Pender	

== District 18 ==
In the pre-1964 apportionment, what is now District 18 was called District 16, and it consisted of the counties of Wayne, Stanton, and Colfax. In 1964, the district gained Pierce County but lost Colfax County. In the 1966 reapportionment, District 18 was shifted to encompass all of Stanton, Colfax, and Cuming counties. In the 1972 redistricting, it gained the northern half of Dodge County, and in the 1981 redistricting, it only lost a small northeast corner of Cuming County. In 1991, District 18 was shifted to include a small southeastern corner of Knox County, the western half of Wayne County, most of Dixon County, and all of Cedar, Pierce, and Stanton counties. As a result of the 2001 redistricting, District 18 was moved completely to consist of eastern portions of Washington and Douglas counties. In the 2011 redistricting, it was shifted completely into Douglas County.

Today, District 18 consists solely of a portion of Douglas County, which has been adjusted for population in subsequent redistrictings.

Name	Years Elected (Appointed)	Party	Residence	Notes
Emil Brodecky	1936, 1938	Dem	Howells	
William Crossland	1940, 1942, 1944	Rep	Wayne	
Norris Schroeder	1946, 1948	Rep	Hoskins	
Lenhart Shultz	1950, 1952, 1954	Rep	Rogers	
Peter H. Claussen	1956, 1958, 1960, 1962, 1964	Dem	Leigh	
William Hasebroock	1966, 1970, 1974, 1978	Rep	West Point	Speaker (1971–1972); Elected previously in District 16
Harry Chronister	(1979), 1980, 1982	Rep	Schuyler	Appointed by Governor Charles Thone
Stan Schellpeper	1986, 1990, 1994, 1998	Dem	Stanton	
Bob Dickey	(1999)	Rep	Laurel	Appointed by Governor Mike Johanns
Doug Cunningham	2000	Rep	Wausa	Elected in 2002 in District 40 after the 2001 redistricting
Moved to Douglas and Washington Counties as part of the 2001 Redistricting
Mick Mines	2002, 2006	Rep	Blair	
Scott Lautenbaugh	(2007), 2008, 2010	Rep	Omaha	Appointed by Governor Dave Heineman
Brett Lindstrom	2014, 2018	Rep	Omaha	
Christy Armendariz	2022	Rep	Omaha	

== District 19 ==
In the pre-1964 apportionment, what is now District 19 was called District 14, and it consisted of the counties of Knox and Cedar. The district was unaffected by the 1964 reapportionment, but in the 1966 reapportionment, it gained a northern portion of Pierce County. In the 1971 redistricting, District 19 gained more area in Pierce County as well as a small part of the northwest corner of Wayne County, and in the 1981 redistricting, it gained all of Pierce County as well as a bit more of Wayne County in the northwest corner. During the 1991 redistricting process, the legislature passed a plan that divided Madison County between two legislative districts (Districts 18 and 19), each of which included other counties as well. Citizens of Madison County challenged the constitutionality of the plan in the case Day v. Nelson, alleging that the Nebraska Constitution required legislative districts to follow county lines when a county has sufficient population to constitute a single district. The Nebraska Supreme Court sided with the citizens of Madison County, and therefore a new plan was approved by the legislature making District 19 to consist of only Madison County. The district boundary was unaffected in the 2001 redistricting, and in the 2011 redistricting, District 19 gained the northwest corner of Stanton County, but in the 2021 redistricting, the district lost its area in Stanton County but gained the southern half of Pierce County.

Today, District 19 consists of Madison County and the southern half of Pierce County.

Name	Years Elected (Appointed)	Party	Residence	Notes
John D. Reynolds	1936	Rep	Niobrara	
Martin Mischke	1938, 1940, 1942	Rep	Crofton	
Dwight Burney	1944, 1946, 1948, 1950, 1952, 1954	Rep	Hartington	Speaker (1955–1957); Governor (1960–1961); Lieutenant Governor (1957–1965)
Jules Burbach	1956, 1958, 1960, 1962, 1964, 1968, 1972	Dem	Crofton	Speaker (1975–1976)
Elroy Hefner	1976, (1976), 1980, 1984, 1988	Rep	Coleridge	Won election in 1976 but was then appointed by Governor J. James Exon after Jules Burbach resigned early
Moved to Madison County as part of the 1991 Redistricting
Connie Day	1992	Dem	Norfolk	
Lee Klein	(1995)	Dem	Battle Creek	Appointed by Governor Ben Nelson
Gene Tyson	1996, 2000	Rep	Norfolk	
Mike Flood	2004, 2008	Rep	Norfolk	Speaker (2007–2013); U.S. Representative (2022–present)
Jim Scheer	2012, 2016	Rep	Norfolk	Speaker (2017–2020)
Mike Flood	2020	Rep	Norfolk	
Rob Dover	(2022), 2024	Rep	Norfolk	Appointed by Governor Pete Ricketts

== District 20 ==
In the pre-1964 apportionment, what is now District 20 was called District 27, and it consisted of the counties of Antelope and Boone. In the 1964 reapportionment, the counties of Garfield and Wheeler were added to the district. However, in the 1966 reapportionment, District 20 was moved completely to south central Douglas County.

Today, District 20 still consists of a portion of south central Douglas County, which has been adjusted for population in subsequent redistrictings.

Name	Years Elected (Appointed)	Party	Residence	Notes
Edwin Schultz	1936, 1938	Rep	Elgin	
Elmer Rakow	1940, 1942	Rep	Neligh	
Edwin Schultz	1944	Rep	Elgin	
Nell Krause	(1946)	Rep	Albion	Appointed by Governor Dwight Griswold
Glenn Cramer	1946, 1948, 1950, 1952, 1954	Rep	Albion	
John G. Donner	1956, 1958	Rep	Elgin	
Matt Wylie	1960, 1962	Rep	Elgin	Husband of Fannie Wylie; Father of William M. Wylie
Fannie Wylie	(1964)	Dem	Elgin	Appointed by Governor Frank B. Morrison; Wife of Matt Wylie; Mother of William M. Wylie
William M. Wylie	1964	Rep	Elgin	Elected later in District 40 after reapportionment; Son of Matt Wylie and Fannie Wylie
Moved to Douglas County as part of the 1966 Reapportionment
Bill Bloom	1966	Dem	Omaha	
Glenn Goodrich	1970, 1974, 1978, 1982, 1986	Dem	Omaha	
Jessie Rasmussen	1990	Dem	Omaha	
Jim Jensen	1994, 1998, 2002	Rep	Omaha	
Brad Ashford	2006, 2010	Dem	Omaha	U.S. Representative (2015–2017); elected as a Republican but later switched to the Democratic Party; previously served as a Senator from District 6
John S. McCollister	2014, 2018	Rep	Omaha	Son of John Y. McCollister
John Fredrickson	2022	Dem	Omaha	

== District 21 ==
In the pre-1964 apportionment, what is now District 21 was called District 15, and it consisted of the counties of Pierce and Madison. In the 1964 reapportionment, it was reduced to only Madison County, but in the 1966 reapportionment, it regained the majority of Pierce County. In the 1971 redistricting, the district lost some of its area in Pierce County, and in the 1981 redistricting, it was once again reduced to only include Madison County. In the 1991 redistricting, District 21 was moved completely and reorganized to include the western portion of Douglas County, the eastern and southern portions of Saunders County, and the northwest corner of Lancaster County. In the 2001 redistricting, the district was reduced to only include southern Saunders County and northwest Lancaster County, and as a result of the 2011 redistricting, it was shifted completely into northwest Lancaster County.

Today, District 21 comprises the northern part of Lancaster County, including portions of the City of Lincoln.

Name	Years Elected (Appointed)	Party	Residence	Notes
Carl H. Peterson	1936, 1938	Rep	Norfolk	
H. G. Greenamyre	1940, 1942	Rep	Norfolk	
Lynn Hutton	(1944)	Rep	Norfolk	Appointed by Governor Dwight Griswold
Ernest Raasch	1944, 1946	Rep	Norfolk	
Charles Wilson	1948, 1950, 1952	Rep	Norfolk	
William Purdy	1954	Rep	Norfolk	
David Tews	1956, 1958	Rep	Norfolk	
H. L. Gerhart	1960, 1962	Rep	Newman Grove	
S. H. Brauer	1964	Rep	Norfolk	
Thomas C. Kennedy	1968, 1972	Dem	Newman Grove	
Keith Boughn	1976	Rep	Norfolk	
Thomas C. Kennedy	(1977), 1978	Dem	Newman Grove	Appointed by Governor J. James Exon
Richard Peterson	1980, 1984, 1988	Rep	Norfolk	
Moved to Lancaster and Saunders Counties as part of the 1991 Redistricting
Carol Hudkins	1992, 1996, 2000, 2004	Rep	Malcolm	
Ken Haar	2008, 2012	Dem	Malcolm	
Mike Hilgers	2016, 2020	Rep	Lincoln	Speaker (2021–2023); State Attorney General (2023–present)
Beau Ballard	(2023), 2024	Rep	Lincoln	Appointed by Governor Pete Ricketts (in consultation with then-incoming Governor Jim Pillen)

== District 22 ==
In the pre-1964 apportionment, what is now District 22 was called District 26, and it consisted of the counties of Nance and Platte. The boundaries of the district were unaffected by the 1964 and 1966 reapportionments. In the 1971 redistricting, the southern half of Boone County was added to the district. In the 1981 redistricting, the district lost a very small portion in the southeast corner of Platte County and also lost the southwest quarter of Boone County, but in the 1991 redistricting, it gained back all of Platte county but lost more of Boone County. As a result of the 2001 redistricting, District 22 lost all of Nance county but gained the northern half of Colfax County. In the 2011 redistricting, it lost a portion of Colfax County but gained the majority of Stanton County.

Today, District 22 consists of the western side of Stanton County and nearly all of Platte County (except a very small portion in the southeast corner). It no longer contains any portion of Colfax County.

Name	Years Elected (Appointed)	Party	Residence	Notes
Richard C. Regan	1936	Dem	Columbus	
Tom Lambert	1938, 1940	Dem	Columbus	Listed as a Republican in the 1939 legislature but later listed as a Democrat in the 1941 legislature
Dudley E. Thompson	1942	Dem	Genoa	
Ed Lusienski	1944, 1946, 1948, 1950, 1952	Dem	Columbus	
Robert C. Brower	(1953), 1954	Rep	Fullerton	Appointed by Governor Robert B. Crosby
August Wagner	1956		Columbus	
John Overly Peck	1958, 1960, 1962	Rep	Columbus	
Fred Gottschalk	(1963)	Dem	Columbus	Appointed by Governor Frank B. Morrison
Herb Nore	1964, 1966, 1970	Rep	Genoa	
Donald Dworak	1974, 1978	Dem	Columbus	Elected as a Republican in 1974 and 1978 but switched to the Democratic Party in 1981
Lee Rupp	1982, 1986	Rep	Monroe	
Helen Campbell	(1988)	Rep	Columbus	Appointed by Governor Kay Orr
Jennie Robak	1988, 1990, 1994, 1998	Dem	Columbus	Mother of Kim Robak
Arnie Stuthman	2002, 2006	Rep	Platte Center	
Paul Schumacher	2010, 2014	Rep	Columbus	
Mike Moser	2018, 2022	Rep	Columbus	

== District 23 ==
In the pre-1964 apportionment, what is now District 23 was called District 17, and it consisted of the counties of Butler and Saunders. The boundaries of the district were unaffected by the 1964 and 1966 reapportionments. In the 1971 redistricting, an eastern part of Polk County was added to the district, and a southeastern part of Saunders County was lost. In 1981, the district was returned to including all of Butler and Saunders counties along with a very small southeastern portion of Platte County. As a result of the 1991 redistricting, District 23 was reorganized to include all of Butler and Colfax counties along with portions of Saunders, Polk, Platte, Dodge, and Cuming counties. In the 2001 redistricting, District 23 was reorganized yet again to include all of Butler County, most of Saunders County except a southern portion, and parts of Colfax, Douglas, and Sarpy counties. In the 2011 redistricting, District 23 was restored to include the entirety of Butler and Saunders counties along with most of Colfax county.

Today, District 23 consists of all of Colfax and Saunders Counties and most of Butler County, except for its western edge.

Name	Years Elected (Appointed)	Party	Residence	Notes
John B. Peterson	1936	Rep	Ashland	
M. E. Westley	1938	Dem	Brainard	
Alfred Brodahl	1940, 1942, 1944	Rep	Wahoo	
Owen Person	1946, 1948, 1950, 1952, 1954	Rep	Wahoo	
Harold Stryker	1956, 1958, 1960, 1962, 1964	Dem	Rising City	
Loran Schmit	1968, 1972, 1976, 1980, 1984, 1988	Rep	Bellwood	
Curt Bromm	1992, 1996, 2000	Rep	Wahoo	Speaker (2003–2004)
Chris Langemeier	2004, 2008	Rep	Schuyler	
Jerry Johnson	2012	Rep	Wahoo	
Bruce Bostelman	2016, 2020	Rep	Brainard	
Jared Storm	2024	Rep	David City	

== District 24 ==
In the pre-1964 apportionment, what is now District 24 was also called District 24, and it consisted of the counties of York and Seward. The boundaries of the district were unaffected by the 1964 and 1966 reapportionments. In the 1971 redistricting, the southeastern corner of Polk County was added to the district, which remained the same after the 1981 redistricting. The portion of Polk County included in District 24 was then enlarged in the 1991 redistricting, enlarged further in the 2001 redistricting, and enlarged even further in the 2011 redistricting to include all of Polk County.

Today, District 24 consists of the entirety of Polk, Seward, and York counties along with the western side of Butler County and very small section of the southeast corner of Platte County.

Name	Years Elected (Appointed)	Party	Residence	Notes
William Diers	1936, 1938	Dem	Gresham	Speaker (1939–1940); Brother of Herbert Diers
Stanley Matzke	1940, 1942	Rep	Milford	Father of Gerald Matzke
Fay Wood	1944, 1946, 1948	Rep	Seward	
Herbert Diers	1950, 1952, 1954	Ind	Gresham	Brother of William Diers
Fay Wood	1956	Rep	Seward	
Herbert Diers	1958, 1960	Ind	Gresham	Brother of William Diers
Clifton Foster	1962	Rep	Benedict	
Stanley Matzke	1964, 1966	Rep	Milford	Father of Gerald Matzke
Wayne Schreurs	(1969)	Rep	Seward	Appointed by Governor Norbert Tiemann
Walter Epke	1970	Rep	York	
Doug Bereuter	1974	Rep	Utica	U.S. Representative (1979–2004)
Harold Sieck	1978, 1982	Dem	Pleasant Dale	
Scott Moore	1986, 1990	Rep	Stromsburg/Seward	Nebraska Secretary of State
Elaine Stuhr	1994, 1998, 2002	Rep	Bradshaw	
Greg L. Adams	2006, 2010	Rep	York	Speaker (2013–2014)
Mark Kolterman	2014, 2018	Rep	Seward	
Jana Hughes	2022	Rep	Seward	

== District 25 ==
In the pre-1964 apportionment, what is now District 25 was called District 18, and it consisted of a section of Lancaster County. In the 1966 reapportionment, District 25 was expanded to include a portion of Cass County. In the 1971 redistricting, it was expanded to include portions of Lancaster County outside the City of Lincoln along with portions of Saunders, Cass, Otoe, and Johnson counties. As a result of the 1981 redistricting, District 25 lost all of its area outside Lancaster County and was made to consist of all the area of Lancaster county surrounding the districts that included portions of the City of Lincoln. In 1991, the district was reduced to only include the eastern side of Lancaster county, including parts of the city of Lincoln, and in the 2001 and 2011 redistrictings, District 25 was readjusted for population mostly in the northeastern corner of Lancaster County.

Today, District 25 consists of a portion of southeastern Lancaster County.

Name	Years Elected (Appointed)	Party	Residence	Notes
Charles J. Warner	1936	Rep	Waverly	Speaker (1937–1938); Lieutenant Governor (1949–1955); father of Jerome Warner
James E. Reed	1938, 1940	Rep	Lincoln	
Henry Phillip Heiliger	1942, 1944, 1946		Lincoln	
Victor Anderson	1948	Rep	Havelock	Governor (1955–1959); Mayor of Lincoln (1950–1953)
Otto Liebers	1950, 1952, 1954, 1956, 1958	Rep	Lincoln	
George A. Knight	1960	Rep	Lincoln	Father of John E. Knight
Jerome Warner	1962, 1964, 1968, 1972, 1976, 1980, 1984, 1988, 1992, 1996	Rep	Waverly	Speaker (1969–1970); Son of Charles J. Warner
Ron Raikes	(1997), 1998, 2000, 2004	Ind	Lincoln	Appointed by Governor Ben Nelson
Kathy Campbell	2008, 2012	Rep	Lincoln	
Suzanne Geist	2016, 2020	Rep	Lincoln	Resigned to run for mayor of Lincoln, Nebraska
Carolyn Bosn	(2023), 2024	Rep	Lincoln	Appointed by Governor Jim Pillen

== District 26 ==
What is now called District 26 was created when the legislature expanded from 43 to 49 districts in 1964, and it consisted of a section of Lancaster County.

Today, District 26 still consists of a portion of Lancaster County, which has been readjusted for population in subsequent redistrictings. It mostly includes the northeast corner of the City of Lincoln.

Name	Years Elected (Appointed)	Party	Residence	Notes
John E. Knight	1964, 1966	Rep	Lincoln	Son of George A. Knight
Wally Barnett, Jr.	1970, 1974	Rep	Lincoln	
L. K. Emry	(1978)	Dem	Lincoln	Appointed by Governor J. James Exon
Don Wesely	1978, 1982, 1986, 1990, 1994	Dem	Lincoln	
Marian Price	1998, 2002	Rep	Lincoln	
Amanda McGill	2006, 2010	Dem	Lincoln	
Matt Hansen	2014, 2018	Dem	Lincoln	
George Dungan III	2022	Dem	Lincoln	

== District 27 ==
In the pre-1964 apportionment, what is now District 27 was called District 19, and it consisted of a section of Lancaster County.

Today, District 27 still consists of a portion of Lancaster County, which has been readjusted for population in subsequent redistrictings. It mostly includes the southwest corner of the City of Lincoln.

Name	Years Elected (Appointed)	Party	Residence	Notes
John H. Comstock	1936	Rep	Lincoln	
George Craven	1938	Dems	Lincoln	
Jack W. Price	1940	Rep	Lincoln	
George Craven	1942	Dem	Lincoln	
Thomas H. Adams	1944, 1946, 1948, 1950	Rep	Lincoln	
Howard Britt	1952	Rep	Lincoln	Husband of Fay Britt
Fay Britt	(1954)	Rep	Lincoln	Appointed by Governor Robert B. Crosby; Wife of Howard Britt
Thomas H. Adams	1954	Rep	Lincoln	
Stanley Portsche	1956, 1958	Rep	Lincoln	
Marvin Stromer	1960, 1962, 1964	Rep	Lincoln	
William Swanson	(1967), 1968	Rep	Lincoln	Appointed by Governor Norbert Tiemann
Steve Fowler	1972, 1976, 1980	Dem	Lincoln	
Bill Harris	(1983), 1984	Dem	Lincoln	Appointed by Governor Bob Kerrey
Stephanie Johanns	(1987)	Rep	Lincoln	Appointed by Governor Kay Orr; wife of Mike Johanns
DiAnna Schimek	1988, 1992, 1996, 2000, 2004	Dem	Lincoln	
Colby Coash	2008, 2012	Rep	Lincoln	
Anna Wishart	2016, 2020	Dem	Lincoln	
Jason Prokop	2024	Dem	Lincoln	

== District 28 ==
What is now called District 28 was created when the legislature expanded from 43 to 49 districts in 1964, and it consisted of a section of Lancaster County.

Today, District 28 still consists of a portion of Lancaster County, which has been readjusted for population in subsequent redistrictings. It mostly includes the central part of the City of Lincoln.

Name	Years Elected (Appointed)	Party	Residence	Notes
Hal Bauer	1964	Dem	Lincoln	
Roland Luedtke	1966, 1970, 1974	Rep	Lincoln	Speaker (1977–1978); Lieutenant Governor (1979–1983); Mayor of Lincoln (1983–1987)
Chris Beutler	1978, 1982	Dem	Lincoln	
James McFarland	(1986), 1986	Dem	Lincoln	Appointed by Governor Bob Kerrey
Chris Beutler	1990, 1994, 1998, 2002	Dem	Lincoln	
Bill Avery	2006, 2010	Dem	Lincoln	
Patty Pansing Brooks	2014, 2018	Dem	Lincoln	
Jane Raybould	2022	Dem	Lincoln	

== District 29 ==
In the pre-1964 apportionment, what is now District 29 was called District 20, and it consisted of a section of Lancaster County.

Today, District 29 still consists of a portion of Lancaster County, which has been readjusted for population in subsequent redistrictings. It mostly includes the south central portion of the City of Lincoln.

Name	Years Elected (Appointed)	Party	Residence	Notes
Lester Dunn	1936, 1938	Rep	Lincoln	
C. Petrus Peterson	1940, 1942, 1944, 1946	Rep	Lincoln	Speaker (1945–1946)
Thomas M. Davies	1948		Lincoln	
Robert McNutt	1950, 1952	Rep	Lincoln	
Robert Perry	1954	Rep	Lincoln	
Fred Waggoner	1956	Dem	Lincoln	
Fern Hubbard Orme	1958, 1960, 1962, 1964, 1968	Rep	Lincoln	
Shirley Marsh	1972, 1976, 1980, 1984	Rep	Lincoln	Wife of Frank Marsh
LaVon Crosby	1988, 1992, 1996	Rep	Lincoln	Wife of Robert B. Crosby
Mike Foley	2000, 2004	Rep	Lincoln	State Auditor (2007–2015, 2023–present), Lieutenant Governor (2015–2023)
Tony Fulton	(2007), 2008	Rep	Lincoln	Appointed by Governor Dave Heineman; Nebraska Tax Commissioner
Kate Bolz	2012, 2016	Dem	Lincoln	
Eliot Bostar	2020, 2024	Dem	Lincoln	

== District 30 ==
In the pre-1964 apportionment, what is now District 30 was called District 21, and it consisted of Gage County. The district's boundaries were unaffected in the reapportionment of 1964; however, in the reapportionment of 1966, it was shifted slightly to include most of Gage County except for the western edge, and Pawnee County was added to it. In the 1971 redistricting, District 30 was modified again by dropping Pawnee County completely, regaining the western edge of Gage County but losing the southeastern corner, and adding portions of Saline and Jefferson counties. As a result of the 1981 redistricting, the district was reorganized to include all of Gage County and only the southeastern corner of Jefferson County. In the 1991 redistricting, District 30 began to gain area in southern Lancaster County; it also lost the bottom third of Gage County and regained the southeastern corner of Saline County and more area in Jefferson County. After the 2001 redistricting, District 30 consisted of all of Gage County and a portion of southern Lancaster County, which continued to be adjusted for population in subsequent redistrictings.

Today, District 30 consists of all of Gage County and a southeastern slice of Lancaster County.

Name	Years Elected (Appointed)	Party	Residence	Notes
Henry Brandt	1936	Dem	Beatrice	
John S. Callan	1938, 1940	Dem	Odell	
Ladd Hubka	1942, 1944	Rep	Beatrice	Brother of Ernie Hubka
John S. Callan	1946, 1948	Dem	Odell	
Joseph Shalla	1950	Dem	Beatrice	
Ernie Hubka	1952, 1954	Rep	Beatrice	Brother of Ladd Hubka
Willard Waldo	1956	Rep	DeWitt	
George F. Fulton	1958	Rep	Beatrice	Seated after a recount in which Fulton was determined to be the winner over Willard Henry Waldo
Willard Waldo	1960	Rep	DeWitt	Later elected in District 31 in 1968
Thomas Damrow	1962	Dem	Beatrice	
Fred Carstens	1964, 1966, 1970	Rep	Beatrice	
Bill Burrows	1974, 1978	Dem	Adams	
Patricia Stalder Morehead	1982, 1986	Dem	Beatrice	
Dennis Byars	(1988), 1990	Rep	Beatrice	Appointed by Governor Kay Orr
David Maurstad	1994	Rep	Beatrice	Lieutenant Governor (1999–2001)
Dennis Byars	1998, 2002	Rep	Beatrice	
Norm Wallman	2006, 2010	Dem	Cortland	
Roy Baker	2014	Rep	Lincoln	
Myron Dorn	2018, 2022	Rep	Adams	

== District 31 ==
In the pre-1964 apportionment, what is now District 31 was called District 22, and it consisted of the counties of Thayer and Jefferson. In the 1964 reapportionment, the district lost Thayer County and gained Saline County. In the 1966 reapportionment, the western edge of Gage County was added to the district. In the 1971 redistricting, the district was moved completely to south central Douglas County.

Today, District 31 still consists of a portion of south central Douglas County, mostly in the Millard area, which has been adjusted for population in subsequent redistrictings.

Name	Years Elected (Appointed)	Party	Residence	Notes
Frank S. Wells	1936	Dem	Fairbury	
J. Lyndon Thornton	1938, 1940	Rep	Fairbury	
J. E. Conklin	1942, 1944	Dem	Hubbell	
R. B. Steele	1946	Rep	Fairbury	
Ralph W. Hill	1948, 1950, 1952	Rep	Hebron	
Arnold Ruhnke	1954, 1956, 1958, 1960, 1962, 1964	Ind	Plymouth	
Willard Waldo	1968, (1968)	Rep	DeWitt	Appointed by Governor Norbert Tiemann after he was elected because seat was vacated early; previously Served from District 30
Moved to Douglas County as part of the 1971 Redistricting
James Dickinson	1972	Rep	Millard	
Neil Simon	1976	Dem	Omaha	
Steve Wiitala	1980	Dem	Omaha	
Gordon McDonald	(1983)	Dem	Omaha	Appointed by Governor Bob Kerrey
Jerry Chizek	1984, 1988	Dem	Omaha	
Kate Witek	1992, 1996	Rep	Omaha	Nebraska Auditor
Mark Quandahl	(1999), 2000	Rep	Omaha	Appointed by Governor Ben Nelson
Rich Pahls	2004, 2008	Rep	Omaha/Boys Town	
Rick Kolowski	2012, 2016	Dem	Omaha	
Rich Pahls	2020	Rep	Omaha	
Kathleen Kauth	(2022), 2022, 2024	Rep	Omaha	Appointed by Governor Pete Ricketts

== District 32 ==
In the pre-1964 apportionment, what is now District 32 was called District 23, and it consisted of the counties of Fillmore and Saline. In the 1964 reapportionment, the district lost Saline County but gained Clay and Thayer counties. District 32 was unaffected by the 1966 reapportionment. In the 1971 redistricting, District 31 lost Clay County, but it gained most of Saline County and half of Jefferson County. In the 1981 redistricting, the district gained all of Saline County and most of Jefferson County except for the southeast corner. As a result of the 1991 redistricting, District 31 lost portions of Saline and Jefferson counties but gained the eastern side of Nuckolls County. In the 2001 redistricting, District 31 lost its area in Nuckoklls County and was adjusted to include all of Fillmore, Saline, Thayer, and Jefferson counties. In the 2011 redistricting, the district gained a portion of southwestern Lancaster County.

Today, District 32 consists of the entirety of Fillmore, Thayer, Saline, and Jefferson counties as well as a southwestern portion of Lancaster County.

Name	Years Elected (Appointed)	Party	Residence	Notes
Alois Slepicka	1936	Dem	Wilber	
John Mekota	1938, 1940, 1942, 1944	Dem	Crete	
C. C. Lillibridge	1946, 1948, 1950, 1952	Rep	Crete	
Mervin Bedford	1954, 1956	Dem	Geneva	
Joe Vosoba	1958, 1960	Dem	Wilber	
Eric Rasmussen	1962, 1964, 1966	Rep	Fairmont	Nebraska Public Service Commissioner (1969–1993)
Theodore Wenzlaff	(1968)	Rep	Sutton	Appointed by Governor Norbert Tiemann
Richard Maresh	1970, 1974, 1978	Rep	Milligan	
Sharon Apking	(1981)	Rep	Alexandria	Appointed by Governor Charles Thone
Don Eret	1982	Dem	Dorchester	Elected as a Republican but later switched to the Democratic Party
George Coordsen	1986, 1990, 1994, 1998	Rep	Hebron	
Jeanne Combs	2002	Rep	Friend	
Russ Karpisek	2006, 2010	Dem	Wilber	
Laura Ebke	2014	Lib	Crete	Elected as a Republican but later switched to the Libertarian Party
Tom Brandt	2018, 2022	Rep	Plymouth	

== District 33 ==
In the pre-1964 apportionment, what is now District 33 was called District 31, and it consisted of the counties of Kearney and Adams. In the 1964 reapportionment, it was reduced to just Adams County. The boundaries of the district were unaffected by the 1966 reapportionment, 1971 redistricting, and 1981 redistricting. After the 1991 redistricting, District 33 gained the southwestern half of Hall County. In the 2001 and 2011 redistrictings, the district continued to expand into Hall County.

Today, as a result of the 2021 redistricting, District 33 contains all of Adams and Kearney counties and a large portion of Phelps County.

Name	Years Elected (Appointed)	Party	Residence	Notes
Leland Hall	1936, 1938	Dem	Roseland	
Harry Bowman	1940, 1942	Rep	Hastings	
Harry F. Russell	(1944)	Rep	Hastings	Appointed by Governor Dwight Griswold
Fred A. Seaton	1944, 1946	Rep	Hastings	U.S. Senator; U.S. Secretary of the Interior
William Bohlke	1948		Hastings	Father-in-law of Ardyce Bohlke
Richard Marvel	1950, 1952	Rep	Hastings	
Kathleen Ackerson Foote	1954, 1956	Dem	Axtell	
Richard Marvel	1958, 1960, 1962, 1964, 1968, 1972, 1976, 1980	Rep	Hastings	Speaker (1979–1982)
Clarence Jacobson	(1982)	Rep	Hastings	Appointed by Governor Charles Thone
Jacklyn Smith	1984, 1988	Rep	Hastings	
Ardyce Bohlke	(1991), 1992, 1996	Dem	Hastings	Appointed by Governor Ben Nelson; daughter-in-law of William Halsey Bohlke
Carroll Burling	2000, 2004	Rep	Kenesaw	
Dennis Utter	2008	Rep	Hastings	
Les Seiler	(2012), 2012	Rep	Hastings	Appointed by Governor Dave Heineman
Steve Halloran	2016, 2020	Rep	Hastings	
Dan Lonowski	2024	Rep	Hastings	

== District 34 ==
In the pre-1964 apportionment, what is now District 34 was called District 25, and it consisted of the counties of Polk, Hamilton, and Clay. In the 1964 reapportionment, the district lost Clay County but gained all of Merrick County. The boundaries of the district were unaffected by the 1966 reapportionment, but in the 1971 redistricting, District 34 regained Clay County and also added the northern half of Nuckolls County while losing the eastern half of Polk County. In the 1981 redistricting, the district gave up its share of Nuckolls County and expanded into portions of Hall County and further portions of Polk County. In the 1991 redistricting, the District 34 lost all of its area in Polk County and gained more in Hall County. After the 2001 redistricting, the district had lost Clay County but it had gained Nance and regained the northwestern half of Polk County. In the 2011 redistricting, the district gained more area in Hall County but lost all of its area in Polk County again.

Today, District 34 contains all of Hamilton, Merrick, and Nance counties along with the northeast corner of Hall County excluding the city of Grand Island.

Name	Years Elected (Appointed)	Party	Residencew	Notes
John N. Norton	1936	Dem	Polk	U.S. Representative (1927–1929, 1931–1933)
Jay Hastings	1938	Rep	Osceola	
Ray Thomas	(1940), 1940, 1942	Dem	Clay Center	Appointed by Governor Robert Leroy Cochran
Lester Anderson	1944, 1946, 1948	Rep	Aurora	
R. H. Kreutz	1950	Dem	Giltner	
Lester Anderson	1952, 1954	Rep	Aurora	
Hans Jensen	1956, 1958, 1960	Dem	Aurora	
Maurice Kremer	1962, 1964, 1966, 1970, 1974, 1978	Rep	Aurora	Father of Bob Kremer
Rod Johnson	1982, 1986, 1990	Rep	Sutton	Nebraska Public Service Commissioner (1993–2023)
Janis Johnson McKenzie	(1993), 1994	Dem	Harvard	Appointed by Governor Ben Nelson
Jerry Willhoft	(1997)	Dem	Central City	Appointed by Governor Ben Nelson
Bob Kremer	1998, 2002	Rep	Aurora	Son of Maurice A. Kremer
Annette Dubas	2006, 2010	Dem	Fullerton	
Curt Friesen	2014, 2018	Rep	Henderson	
Loren Lippincott	2022	Rep	Central City	

== District 35 ==
In the pre-1964 apportionment, what is now District 35 was called District 30, and it consisted of the counties of Hall and Merrick. In the 1964 reapportionment, the district was reduced to just Hall County, and in the 1966 reapportionment, the district was further reduced to just the northeastern corner of Hall County, which contains the city of Grand Island.

Today, District 35 consists of just the portion of Hall County containing Grand Island, which has been adjusted for population in subsequent redistrictings.

Name	Years Elected (Appointed)	Party	Residence	Notes
John Knickrehm	1936	Rep	Grand Island	
Alva Johnston	1938	Rep	Doniphan	
Walter Raecke	1940, 1942, 1944, 1946	Dem	Central City	Speaker (1947–1948)
Louis Holmes	1948	Rep	Grand Island	
H. G. Wellensiek	1950	Rep	Grand Island	
Joseph D. Martin	1952, 1954	Dem	Grand Island	
Marvin Lautenschlager	1956, 1958, 1960	Rep	Grand Island	
Ted Reeves	1962	Rep	Central City	
Ira Paine	1964	Rep	Grand Island	
Don Elrod	(1966), 1966, 1968	Dem	Grand Island	Appointed by Governor Frank B. Morrison
Ralph Kelly	1972, 1976	Rep	Grand Island	
Howard Peterson	1980	Rep	Grand Island	
Arlene Nelson	1984, 1988	Dem	Grand Island	
Dan Fisher	1992	Rep	Grand Island	
Chris Peterson	1996	Rep	Grand Island	
Ray Aguilar	(1999), 2000, 2004	Rep	Grand Island	Appointed by Governor Mike Johanns
Mike Gloor	2008, 2012	Rep	Grand Island	
Dan Quick	2016	Dem	Grand Island	
Ray Aguilar	2020	Rep	Grand Island	
Dan Quick	2024	Dem	Grand Island	

== District 36 ==
In the pre-1964 apportionment, what is now District 36 was called District 34, and it consisted of the counties of Sherman and Buffalo. In the 1964 reapportionment, the district was reduced to just Buffalo County, and in the 1966 reapportionment, it added the northwest corner of Hall County. In the 1971 redistricting, District 36 was shifted to include only the eastern half of Buffalo County and most of Hall County, excluding the City of Grand Island and the northern edge of Hall County. However, in the 1981 redistricting, District 36 lost area in the southeast corner of Hall County but gained back all of Buffalo County except for the City of Kearney. After the 1991 redistricting, the district began to shift west, losing all of its area in Hall County but gaining all of Dawson and the southwest corner of Sherman County. In the 2001 redistricting, District 36 lost all of its area in Sherman County and also the southwest corner of Dawson County. In the 2011 redistricting, it regained all of Dawson County, lost all but a northern section of Buffalo County, and added all of the sizeable Custer County. In the 2021 redistricting, District 36 was moved completely to Sarpy County.

Today, District 36 consists of roughly the southwest half of Sarpy County.

Name	Years Elected (Appointed)	Party	Residence	Notes
Roy W. Johnson	1936	Rep	Miller	Lieutenant Governor (1943–1947)
Fred Mueller	1938, 1940, 1942, 1944, 1946	Rep	Kearney	
Walter J. Williams	1948, 1950, 1952		Kearney	
Norman Otto	1954, 1956, 1958	Dem	Kearney	
Ernest Staubitz	1960	Rep	Kearney	
Richard Lysinger	1962, 1964	Rep	Ravenna	
Leslie Robinson	1966	Rep	Kearney	
Gerald Stromer	1970	Rep	Kearney	
Ron Cope	1974, 1978	Rep	Kearney	
Ray Lundy	1982	Dem	Kearney	
Lorraine Langford	1986	Rep	Kearney	
Jim D. Cudaback	1990, 1994, 1998, 2002	Rep	Riverdale	
John Wightman	2006, 2010	Rep	Lexington	
Matt Williams	2014, 2018	Rep	Gothenburg	
Moved to Sarpy County as part of the 2021 Redistricting
Rick Holdcroft	2022	Rep	Bellevue	

== District 37 ==
In the pre-1964 apportionment, what is now District 37 was called District 32, and it consisted of the counties of Franklin, Webster, and Nuckolls. In the 1964 reapportionment, District 37 gained Kearney County, and in the 1966 reapportionment, it gained the eastern half of Harlan County. In the 1971 redistricting, the district lost its eastern half of Harlan County and the northern Half of Nuckolls County but gained a slice in the western part of Buffalo County. In the 1981 redistricting, District 37 regained all of Nuckolls County, but lost its area in Buffalo County except for the City of Kearney. After the 1991 redistricting, the district was resituated to include only Kearney County and the part of Buffalo County containing the City of Kearney. District 37 was unaffected by the 2001 redistricting, but in the 2011 redistricting, it lost Kearney County and was reduced to the southeast portion of Buffalo County which contained the City of Kearney. In the 2021 redistricting, District 37 was further reduced to the area around the City of Kearney.

Today, District 37 contains a portion of Buffalo County which contains the City of Kearney.

Name	Years Elected (Appointed)	Party	Residence	Notes
Earl Carpenter	1936	Dem	Guide Rock	
Daniel Garber	1938, 1940, 1942, 1944, 1946	Rep	Red Cloud	Nephew of Silas Garber
Carl Lindgren	1948, 1950	Rep	Campbell	
William McHenry	1952, 1954, 1956	Rep	Nelson	
Kenneth Bowen	1958, 1960, 1962, 1964	Rep	Red Cloud	Speaker (1965–1966)
Richard Ely	(1967)	Rep	Guide Rock	Appointed by Governor Norbert Tiemann
Wayne Ziebarth	1968	Dem	Wilcox	
Gary Anderson	1972	Dem	Axtell	Originally elected as a Republican but switched to the Democratic Party in 1973
Martin Kahle	1976, 1980	Dem	Kearney	
Jerry D. Miller	1984, (1984)	Dem	Davenport	Won election in 1984 and was then appointed by Governor Bob Kerrey after Martin Kahle died
Doug Kristensen	1988, 1992, 1996, 2000	Rep	Minden	Speaker (1997–2002)
Joel T. Johnson	(2002), 2002, 2004	Rep	Kearney	Appointed by Governor Mike Johanns
Galen Hadley	2008, 2012	Rep	Kearney	Speaker (2015–2016)
John Lowe	2016, 2020	Rep	Kearney	
Stan Clouse	2024	Rep	Kearney	

== District 38 ==
In the pre-1964 apportionment, what is now District 38 was called District 33, and it consisted of the counties of Red Willow, Furnas, and Harlan. The district was unaffected by the 1964 reapportionment, but in the 1966 reapportionment, it gained Frontier and Gosper counties but lost the eastern half of Harlan County. As a result of the 1971 redistricting, District 38 regained all of Harlan County as well as the eastern half of Hayes County. In the 1981 redistricting, it lost its area in Hayes County but gained a substantial southern portion of Lincoln County. In the 1991 redistricting, the district was shifted substantially eastward, losing all of Frontier and Red Willow counties as well as its area in Lincoln County and a small slice on the western edge of Furnas County; however, it gained Phelps, Franklin, and Webster counties as well as a majority portion of Nuckolls County. With the 2001 redistricting, District 38 continued its shift eastward by losing Furnas County but acquiring all of Nuckolls County and adding Clay County. In the 2011 redistricting, the district yet again moved eastward, losing Gosper and Harlan counties but gaining Kearney County and the southwest part of Buffalo County. As a result of the 2021 redistricting, District 38 began to move westward again, regaining its original three counties, Harlan, Furnas, and Red Willow counties, but losing its area in Buffalo County, most of its area in Phelps County except for a portion containing the City of Holdrege, and all of Kearney County.

Today, District 38 consists of Red Willow, Furnas, Harlan, Franklin, Webster, Nuckolls, and Clay counties as well as the portion of Phelps County containing the City of Holdrege.

Name	Years Elected (Appointed)	Party	Residence	Notes
Earl Neubauer	1936, 1938, 1940, 1942	Dem	Orleans	
Ed Hoyt	1944, 1946, 1948, 1950	Rep	McCook	Speaker (1951–1952)
George Frazier	(1952)	Rep	Oxford	Appointed by Governor Val Peterson
Tom Coffey	1952		Alma	
Donald Thompson	1954, 1956, 1958, 1960, 1962	Rep	McCook	Speaker (1961–1962)
Lester Harsh	1964, 1966	Rep	Bartley/McCook	
Richard Lewis	1970, 1974	Rep	Holbrook	
Tom Vickers	1978, 1982	Dem	Farnam	Elected in 1978 and 1982 as a Republican but switched to the Democratic Party in 1983
Owen Elmer	1986, 1990	Rep	Indianola	Elected in 1994 in District 44 after the 1991 Redistricting
Ed Schrock	1994, 1998, 2002	Rep	Elm Creek	Previously appointed to District 39 in 1990 before the 1991 Redistricting
Tom Carlson	2006, 2010	Rep	Holdrege	
John Kuehn	2014	Rep	Heartwell	
Dave Murman	2018, 2022	Rep	Glenvil	

== District 39 ==
In the pre-1964 apportionment, what is now District 39 was called District 36, and it consisted of the counties of Dawson, Gosper, and Phelps. The district was unaffected by the 1964 reapportionment, but in the 1966 reapportionment, District 39 lost Gosper County. In the redistricting of 1971, the district gained a thin slice on the western edge of Buffalo County, but that area of Buffalo County was then lost in the redistricting of 1981. As a result of the redistricting of 1991, District 39 was moved to the central part of Douglas County where it contained mostly Douglas County and a very little bit of northern Sarpy County. In the 2001 redistricting, District 39 was extended North to include the southwestern corner of Washington County. After the 2011 redistricting, the district was shifted completely into Douglas County.

Today, District 39 consists of a portion of Douglas County on its western side.

Name	Years Elected (Appointed)	Party	Residence	Notes
Swan Carlson	1936, 1938, 1940	Dem	Funk	
Delmar Anderson	1942		Lexington	
Lloyd Kain	1944, 1946	Rep	Lexington	
Willard Martin Wilson	1948		Holdrege	
Herbert Duis	1950, 1952	Rep	Gothenburg	
Arthur Swanson	1954, 1956, 1958	Rep	Holdrege	
Albert Kjar	1960, 1962, 1964	Dem	Lexington	
Herbert Duis	1968, 1972, 1976	Rep	Gothenburg	
Bill Barrett	(1979), 1980, 1984, 1988	Rep	Lexington	Speaker (1987–1991); appointed by Governor Charles Thone; U.S. Representative (1991–2001)
Ed Schrock	(1990)	Rep	Elm Creek	Appointed by Governor Kay Orr; Elected in 1994 in District 38 after the 1991 Redistricting
Moved to Douglas County as part of the 1991 Redistricting
Dwite Pedersen	1992, 1996, 2000, 2004	Rep	Elkhorn	
Beau McCoy	2008, 2012	Rep	Omaha	
Lou Ann Linehan	2016, 2020	Rep	Omaha	
Tony Sorrentino	2024	Rep	Elkhorn	

== District 40 ==
In the pre-1964 apportionment, what is now District 40 was called District 28, and it consisted of the counties of Keya Paha, Rock, Boyd, and Holt. In the 1964 reapportionment, the district was relabeled as District 42, but its boundaries remained unchanged. In the 1966 reapportionment, the district was again relabeled as District 40 and was shifted slightly eastward, losing Keya Paha and Rock counties but gaining Wheeler and Antelope counties. In the 1971 redistricting, District 40 lost Wheeler County but gained a substantial northern portion of Boone County. In the 1981 redistricting, the district gained even more area in Boone County such that the district now contained about three quarters of Boone County except the southeastern corner. As a result of the 1991 redistricting, District 40 lost all of its area in Boone County but added almost all of Knox County except for a small section in the southeast corner. In the 2001 redistricting, the district shifted substantially eastward, losing Boyd and Antelope counties as well as the western half of Holt county, but it gained all the area of Knox County as well as Pierce and Cedar counties. In the 2011 redistricting, District 40 regained Boyd County and all of Holt County, gained Rock and Dixon counties, and lost Pierce County. After the 2021 redistricting, District 40 lost Rock and Boyd counties again as well as a southern portion of Dixon County, but it gained Antelope County and the northern half of Pierce County.

Today, District 40 consists of the entirety of Holt, Knox, Antelope, and Cedar counties as well as most of Dixon County and the northern half of Pierce County.

Name	Years Elected (Appointed)	Party	Residence	Notes
Frank J. Brady	1936, 1938	Rep	Atkinson	
Tony Asimus	1940, 1942	Dem	O’Neill	
Dennis Cronin	1944	Rep	O’Neill	
John L. Copeland	1946		Mariaville	
Frank Nelson	1948, 1950, 1952, 1954, 1956, 1958, 1960, 1962, 1964	Rep	O’Neill	
Francis D. Lee	(1966)	Dem	Atkinson	Appointed by Governor Frank B. Morrison
William M. Wylie	1966	Rep	Elgin	Elected previously in District 20; Son of Matt Wylie and Fannie Wylie
John De Camp	1970, 1974, 1978, 1982	Rep	Neligh	Was associated with the Democratic and Libertarian Parties at other points in his career
Cap Dierks	1986, 1990, 1994, 1998	Dem	Ewing	
Doug Cunningham	2002	Rep	Wausa	Elected previously in District 18
Cap Dierks	2006	Rep	Ewing	Switched to the Republican Party since the last time he was elected
Tyson Larson	2010, 2014	Rep	O'Neill	
Tim Gragert	2018	Rep	Creighton	
Barry DeKay	2022	Rep	Niobrara	

== District 41 ==
In the pre-1964 apportionment, what is now District 41 was called District 29, and it consisted of the counties of Wheeler, Valley, Greeley, and Howard. In the 1964 reapportionment, the district lost Wheeler County and gained Sherman. In the 1966 reapportionment, Boone County was added to the district. In the 1971 redistricting, District 41 lost Boone County but gained all of Loup, Garfield County, Nebraska, and Wheeler counties as well as the northeast corner of Custer County and the northern edge of Hall County. In the 1981 redistricting, District 41 was largely unaffected, with only slight changes to its boundaries within Custer and Hall counties. After the 1991 redistricting, the district lost Loup county as well as part of its area in Sherman County and most of its area in Custer County except for a small carve-out. However, the district gained most of Boone County except for a part in the southeast corner and added to its territory in Hall County. In the 2001 redistricting, the district gained back all of Sherman County, gained the remainder of Boone County, and added Antelope County while slightly adjusting its boundaries in Hall County. In the 2011 redistricting, District 41 gave up all of its area in Hall County but added Pierce County. After the 2021 redistricting, the district shifted southward, losing Garfield, Antelope, and Pierce counties, but gaining most of Buffalo County, except for an area around the City of Kearney, and most of Hall County, except for an area around the City of Grand Island.

Today, District 41 consists of the entirety of Wheeler, Boone, Valley, Greeley, Sherman, and Howard counties as well as most of Buffalo County, except for the area around the city of Kearney comprised by District 37, and most of Hall County except for the area around the city of Grand Island comprised by Districts 34 and 35.

Name	Years Elected (Appointed)	Party	Residence	Notes
Tracy Frost	1936	Dem	St. Paul	
John F. Doyle	1938	Dem	Greeley	
Joe Knezacek	1940	Rep	Ord	
John F. Doyle	1942, 1944, 1946	Dem	Greeley	
Hugh Carson	1948, 1950, 1952	Rep	Ord	
LeRoy Bahensky	1954, 1956	Dem	Palmer/St. Paul	
Jack Romans	1958, 1960	Rep	Ord	Nebraska Public Service Commissioner (1975–1982)
LeRoy Bahensky	1962	Dem	St. Paul	
Rudolf Kokes	1964, 1968	Dem	Ord	
Dennis L. Rasmussen	1972, 1976	Rep	Scotia	
Donald Wagner	(1979), 1980	Rep	Ord	Appointed by Governor Charles Thone
Carson Rogers	1984, 1988	Rep	Ord	
Jerry Schmitt	1992, 1996	Rep	Ord	
Richard N. McDonald	2000	Rep	Rockville	Husband of Vickie McDonald
Vickie McDonald	(2001), 2002, 2004	Rep	St. Paul	Appointed by Governor Mike Johanns; Wife of Richard N. McDonald
Kate Sullivan	2008, 2012	Dem	Cedar Rapids	
Tom Briese	2016, 2020	Rep	Albion	Resigned to become Nebraska State Treasurer
Fred Meyer	(2023)	Rep	St. Paul	Appointed by Governor Jim Pillen
Dan McKeon	2024	Rep	Amherst	Resigned on January 13, 2026
Fred Meyer	(2026)	Rep	St. Paul	Appointed by Governor Jim Pillen

== District 42 ==
In the pre-1964 apportionment, what is now District 42 was called District 35, and it consisted of the counties of Loup, Garfield, and Custer. In the 1964 reapportionment, the district was relabeled as District 40 and shifted slightly westward; it lost Garfield County but gained the counties of Hooker, Thomas, Blaine, McPherson, and Logan. In the 1966 reapportionment, the district was again relabeled as District 42 and expanded by regaining Garfield County and adding Garden and Arthur counties. In the 1971 redistricting, District 42 was substantially reorganized and moved slightly southward to consist of only Lincoln County and a small western section of Custer County. As a result of the 1981 redistricting, the area of District 42 was reduced to only include a substantial northeastern portion of Lincoln County, including the City of North Platte. In the 1991 redistricting, the district was expanded to include all of Lincoln County, and its area remained unaffected by the 2001 and 2011 redistrictings. In the 2021 redistricting, District 42 gained Hooker, Thomas, McPherson, and Logan counties along with three quarters of Perkins County.

Today, District 42 consists of the entirety of Lincoln, Hooker, McPherson, Thomas, and Logan counties as well as three quarters of Perkins county, excluding its southwest corner.

Name	Years Elected (Appointed)	Party	Residence	Notes
Bill Haycock	1936	Dem	Callaway	
A. C. Van Diest	1938, 1940	Dem	Almeria	
Harry Burnham	1942, 1944, 1946, 1948	Rep	Sargent	
K. W. Peterson	1950, 1952, 1954	Rep	Sargent	
Dwain Williams	1956, 1958	Rep	Broken Bow	
Duke Forrester	1960, 1962	Rep	Anselmo	
Chester Paxton	1964	Rep	Thedford	
J. James Waldron	1966, 1970	Rep	Callaway	
Moved to Lincoln County as part of the 1971 Redistricting
Myron Rumery	1974, 1978	Dem	North Platte	
James Pappas	1982, (1982), 1986	Dem	North Platte	Won election in 1980 but was then appointed by Governor Charles Thone after Rumery died. Elected as a Republican but later switched to the Democratic Party
David Bernard-Stevens	(1987), 1988, 1990, 1994	Rep	North Platte	Appointed by Governor Kay Orr
Don Pederson	(1996), 1996, 1998, 2002	Rep	North Platte	Appointed by Governor Ben Nelson; Father of Steve Pederson
Tom Hansen	2006, 2010	Rep	North Platte	
Mike Groene	2014, 2018	Rep	North Platte	
Mike Jacobson	(2022), 2022	Rep	North Platte	Appointed by Governor Pete Ricketts

== District 43 ==
In the pre-1964 apportionment, what is now District 43 was called District 40, and it consisted of the counties of Sheridan, Cherry, and Brown. It was unaffected in the 1964 reapportionment, but in the 1966 reapportionment, the counties of Grant, Rock, and Keya Paha were added. In the 1971 redistricting, District 43 lost its western counties of Sheridan and Grant but it gained a number of counties to the south, including Hooker, Thomas, Blaine, McPherson, and Logan as well as most of Custer. In the 1981 redistricting, District 43 was unaffected except that the shape of the portion of Custer County contained within it was altered. As a result of the 1991 redistricting, the district gained Grant and Loup counties as well as a portion of Sheridan County. It also gained most of Custer County except for a small carve-out on the east side. During the 2001 redistricting, the district shifted slightly eastward, giving up Grant County, its portion of Sheridan County, and the western edge of Cherry County, but adding the last little bit of Custer County as well as all of Boyd County and half of Holt County. In the 2011 redistricting, District 43 shifted back westward, regaining the western edge of Cherry County and gaining all of Grant and Sheridan counties along with an eastern portion of Box Butte County while losing its area in Holt County and all of Boyd, Rock, and Custer counties. In the 2021 redistricting, District 43 lost its area in Box Butte County and many of its counties in the southern part of the district, including Grant, Hooker, Thomas, McPherson, and Logan counties. On its eastern side, it added Boyd, Rock, Garfield, and Custer counties.

Today, District 43 consists of Dawes, Sheridan, Cherry, Keya Paha, Boyd, Brown, Rock, Blaine, Loup, Garfield, and Custer counties.

Name	Years Elected (Appointed)	Party	Residence	Notes
Allen A. Strong	1936	Rep	Gordon	
George Gross	1938	Dem	Valentine	
Don Hanna	1940, 1942, 1944	Rep	Brownlee/Valentine	Father of Don E. Hanna, Jr.
Joe Leedom	1946	Rep	Gordon	
Don Hanna	1948	Rep	Valentine	Father of Don E. Hanna, Jr.
Jay Cole	1950, 1952, 1954, 1956	Rep	Merriman	
Earl Hollenbeck	1958	Rep	Long Pine	
Elvin Adamson	1960, 1962, 1964, 1968	Rep	Nenzel/Valentine	Speaker (1967–1968)
Don Hanna Jr.	(1969)	Rep	Brownlee	Appointed by Governor Norbert Tiemann; Son of Don Hanna
Otho Kime	1970, 1972	Rep	Valentine	
Howard Lamb	1976, 1980, 1984, 1988	Rep	Anselmo	
Jim Jones	1992, 1996, 2000	Rep	Eddyville	
Deb Fischer	2004, 2008	Rep	Valentine	U.S. Senator
Al Davis	2012	Rep	Hyannis	
Tom Brewer	2016, 2020	Rep	Gordon	
Tanya Storer	2024	Rep	Whitman	

== District 44 ==
In the pre-1964 apportionment, what is now District 44 was called District 39, and it consisted of the counties of Garden, Deuel, Grant, Arthur, Keith, Hooker, McPherson, Thomas, Logan, and Blaine. In the 1964 reapportionment, the district shifted substantially westward, losing the eastern counties of Blaine, Thomas, Logan, Hooker, and McPherson but gaining Morrill County to the west. In the 1966 reapportionment, the district again shifted substantially, but this time to the south to absorb most of the previous District 46 which was moved. The district lost all of its counties except for Deuel and Keith counties, but it gained Perkins, Chase, Dundy, Hayes, and Hitchcock counties. In the 1971 redistricting, District 44 lost the eastern half of Hayes County but regained Arthur and Garden counties to the north. In the 1981 redistricting, it regained all of Hayes County as well as all of Grant County and a western portion of Lincoln County, but it lost Garden County. As a result of the 1991 redistricting, District 44 lost its northern counties of Deuel, Grant, Arthur, and Keith as well as its area in Lincoln County, but it gained Frontier and Red Willow counties as well as a thin western slice of Furnas County. In the 2001 redistricting, District 44 gained all of Furnas County and a triangular portion of the southwest corner of Dawson County. After the 2011 redistricting, the district lost its area in Dawson County but gained Gosper and Harlan counties. In the 2021 redistricting, District 44 lost Harlan, Furnas, and Red Willow counties as well as three quarters of Perkins County, except for the southwest corner, but it gained Dawson County.

Today, District 44 consists of the southwest quarter of Perkins County as well as the entirety of Chase, Dundy, Hayes, Hitchcock, Frontier, Dawson, and Gosper counties.

Name	Years Elected (Appointed)	Party	Residence	Notes
Rufus Howard	1936, 1938, 1940	Rep	Flats/Sutherland	Speaker (1941–1942)
Carl Jeffords	1942, 1944	Rep	Mullen	
Clyde Cretsinger	1946, 1948	Rep	Paxton	
Joshua Brown	1950, 1952	Rep	Brule	
Clyde Cretsinger	(1954)	Rep	Paxton	Appointed by Governor Robert B. Crosby
Donald McGinley	1954, 1956	Dem	Ogallala	U.S. Representative (1959–1961); Lieutenant Governor (1983–1987)
Lewis Webb	1958, 1960	Rep	Ogallala	
Donald McGinley	1962	Dem	Ogallala	
Ramey Whitney	1964, 1966, 1970	Rep	Chappell	
Jack Mills	1974	Dem	Big Springs	
Shirley Parks	(1978)	Dem	Ogallala	Appointed by Governor J. James Exon
Rex Haberman	1978, 1982, 1986, 1990	Rep	Imperial	
Owen Elmer	1994	Rep	Indianola	Elected previously in District 38
Tom Baker	1998, 2002	Rep	Trenton	
Mark R. Christensen	2006, 2010	Rep	Imperial	
Dan Hughes	2014, 2018	Rep	Venango	
Teresa Ibach	2022	Rep	Sumner	Wife of Greg Ibach

== District 45 ==
In the pre-1964 apportionment, what is now District 45 was called District 38, and it consisted of the counties of Lincoln and Frontier. In the 1964 reapportionment, it was reduced to just Lincoln County. District 45 was unaffected by the 1966 reapportionment, but in the 1971 redistricting, it was moved completely to the eastern side of Sarpy County, where it has remained.

Today, District 45 consists of an eastern portion of Sarpy County, which has been readjusted for population in subsequent redistrictings.

Name	Years Elected (Appointed)	Party	Residence	Notes
Harry Pizer	1936	Dem	North Platte	Speaker (1959–1960)
Charles Herrick	1938	Dem	Curtis	
Robert B. Crosby	1940, 1942	Rep	North Platte	Speaker (1943–1944); Lieutenant Governor (1947–1949); Governor (1953–1955); husband of LaVon Crosby
Harry Pizer	1944, 1946, 1948, 1950, 1952, 1954, 1956, 1958	Rep	North Platte	Speaker (1959–1960); listed as a Democrat in the 1937 legislature but later listed as a Republican
Cecil Craft	1960, 1962, 1964	Rep	North Platte	Husband of Ellen Craft
Ellen Craft	(1966)	Rep	North Platte	Appointed by Governor Frank B. Morrison; wife of Cecil Craft
Glenn Viehmeyer	1966	Dem	North Platte	
Ellen Craft	1968	Rep	North Platte	Wife of Cecil Craft
Moved to Sarpy County as part of the 1971 Redistricting
Frank Lewis	1972, 1976	Dem	Bellevue	Elected as a Republican in 1972 but switched to the Democratic Party in 1973
George Fenger	1980	Rep	Bellevue	
D. Paul Hartnett	1984, 1988, 1992, 1996, 2000	Dem	Bellevue	
Abbie Cornett	2004, 2008	Rep	Bellevue	Initially elected as a Democrat but switched to the Republican Party in 2006
Sue Crawford	2012, 2016	Dem	Bellevue	
Rita Sanders	2020, 2024	Rep	Bellevue	

== District 46 ==
In the pre-1964 apportionment, what is now District 46 was called District 37, and it consisted of the counties of Perkins, Chase, Dundy, Hayes, and Hitchcock. In the 1964 reapportionment, Frontier County was added to the district, but in the 1966 reapportionment, District 46 was moved completely to Lancaster County, where it has remained.

Today, District 46 consists of a portion of Lancaster County, which has been readjusted for population in subsequent redistrictings. It mostly includes the northwest part of the City of Lincoln.

Name	Years Elected (Appointed)	Party	Residence	Notes
Hugh Ashmore	1936, 1938	Rep	Palisade	
Arthur Carmody	1940, 1942, 1944, 1946, 1948, 1950, 1952	Rep	Trenton	
George Hoffmeister	1954	Dem	Imperial	
Norval Dame	1956	Dem	Stratton	
Dale Erlewine	1958, 1960, 1962	Ind	Grant	
Horace C. Crandall	1964	Rep	Curtis	
Moved to Lancaster County as part of the 1966 Reapportionment
Harold D. Simpson	1966, 1970, 1974	Rep	Lincoln	Nebraska Public Service Commissioner (1977–1989)
JoAnn Maxey	(1977)	Dem	Lincoln	Appointed by Governor J. James Exon
David Landis	1978, 1982, 1986, 1990, 1994, 1998, 2002	Dem	Lincoln	
Danielle Conrad	2006, 2010	Dem	Lincoln	
Adam Morfeld	2014, 2018	Dem	Lincoln	
Danielle Conrad	2022	Dem	Lincoln	

== District 47 ==
In the pre-1964 apportionment, what is now District 47 was called District 43, and it consisted of the counties of Banner, Kimball, Morrill, and Cheyenne. In the 1964 reapportionment, the district lost Morrill County, but in the 1966 reapportionment, it gained the western half of Scotts Bluff County. In the 1971 redistricting, District 47 regained Morrill County and also gained more area in Scotts Bluff County, consisting of the eastern and western thirds, but not the central third, of the county. In the 1981 redistricting, the district continued to grow by gaining Garden County. As a result of the 1991 redistricting, the district gained three more counties, Arthur, Deuel, and Keith, but it lost Banner County and all of its area in Scotts Bluff County. In the 2001 redistricting, District 47 regained Banner County, and in the 2011 redistricting, it added Sioux County and most of Box Butte County except for the eastern edge. In the 2021 redistricting, District 47 lost Banner and Kimball counties but gained all of Box Butte County as well as Grant County.

Today, District 47 consists of Sioux, Box Butte, Morrill, Cheyenne, Garden, Deuel, Grant, Arthur, and Keith counties.

Name	Years Elected (Appointed)	Party	Residence	Notes
Arthur L. Miller	1936, 1938	Rep	Kimball	U.S. Representative (1943–1959)
Ernest Blome	1940	Dem	Sidney	
Thomas C. Osborne	1942	Dem	Bayard	
Ray Babcock	1944, 1946, 1948, 1950		Sidney	
Albert Fenske	1952, 1954, 1956, 1958	Rep	Sunol	
George Fleming	1960, 1962, 1964	Dem	Sidney	
Robert Clark	1968, 1972, 1976, 1980	Rep	Sidney	
Dennis Baack	1984, 1988, 1992	Rep	Kimball	Speaker (1991–1993)
Gerald Matzke	(1993), 1994, 1996	Rep	Sidney	Appointed by Governor Ben Nelson; Son of Stanley A. Matzke
Philip Erdman	2000, 2004	Rep	Bayard	Son of Steve Erdman
Ken Schilz	2008, 2012	Rep	Ogallala	
Steve Erdman	2016, 2020	Rep	Bayard	Father of Philip Erdman
Paul Strommen	2024	Rep	Sidney	

== District 48 ==
In the pre-1964 apportionment, what is now District 48 was called District 42, and it consisted of Scotts Bluff County. In the 1964 reapportionment, the district was unaffected, but in the 1966 reapportionment, it was reduced to only include the eastern half of Scotts Bluff County, including the city of Scottsbluff. In the 1971 redistricting, it was further reduced to include the central third of Scotts Bluff County, retaining the city of Scottsbluff. Though the district was readjusted for population in 1981, 1991, and 2001, it still consisted of a portion of central Scotts Bluff County. In the 2011 redistricting, District 48 was expanded to once again include all of Scotts Bluff County. In the 2021 redistricting, Banner and Kimball counties were added to the district.

Today, District 48 consists of Scotts Bluff, Banner, and Kimball counties.

Name	Years Elected (Appointed)	Party	Residence	Notes
Leslie Murphy	1936, 1938, 1940	Rep	Scottsbluff/Kimball	
James Hodson Anderson	1942, 1944	Rep	Scottsbluff	Nebraska Attorney General
Otto Prohs	1946, 1948, 1950	Rep	Gering	Speaker (1952)
Terry Carpenter	1952	Rep	Scottsbluff	U.S. Representative (1933–1935)
Amos Morrison	1954	Rep	Mitchell	
Terry Carpenter	1956, 1958	Rep	Scottsbluff	U.S. Representative (1933–1935)
Theodore McCosh	1960	Rep	Gering	
Terry Carpenter	1962, 1964, 1966, 1970	Dem	Scottsbluff	U.S. Representative (1933–1935); began his tenure as a Republican but switched to the Democratic Party in 1972
Charles Davey	(1974)	Dem	Scottsbluff	Appointed by Governor J. James Exon
William E. Nichol	1974, 1978, 1982	Rep	Scottsbluff	Speaker (1983–1987); Lieutenant Governor (1987–1991)
John Weihing	1986	Rep	Gering	
Joyce Hillman-Kortum	1990, 1994	Dem	Gering	
Adrian Smith	1998, 2002	Rep	Scottsbluff	U.S. Representative (2007–present)
John Harms	2006, 2010	Rep	Scottsbluff	
John Stinner	2014, 2018	Rep	Gering	
Brian Hardin	2022	Rep	Gering	

== District 49 ==
In the pre-1964 apportionment, what is now District 49 was called District 41, and it consisted of the counties of Sioux, Dawes, and Box Butte. The district was unaffected by the 1964 reapportionment, but in the 1966 reapportionment, it gained Morrill County. In the 1971 redistricting, District 49 lost Morrill County but gained Sheridan and Grant counties. As a result of the 1981 redistricting, the district lost Grant County. In the 1991 redistricting, District 49 lost a portion of Sheridan County but gained all of Banner County and eastern and western portions of Scotts Bluff County, not including the City of Scottsbluff. After the 2001 redistricting, District 49 lost Banner County but regained all of Sheridan County as well as Grant County and a western slice of Cherry County. As a result of the 2011 redistricting, the district was moved completely to the northwest corner of Sarpy County.

Today, District 49 consists of a portion of Sarpy County, which has been readjusted for population in subsequent redistrictings.

Name	Years Elected (Appointed)	Party	Residence	Notes
Harry Gantz	1936, 1938, 1940, 1942	Dem	Alliance	
William Hern	1944, 1946, 1948, 1950	Rep	Chadron	
J. Monroe Bixler	1952, 1954, 1956	Rep	Harrison	
George Gerdes	1958, 1960, 1962, 1964	Rep	Alliance	
Leslie Stull	1968, 1972	Rep	Alliance	
Samuel Cullan	1976, 1980	Rep	Hemingford	Elected as an independent in 1976, but switched to the Republican Party in 1980
Sandra K. Scofield	(1983), 1984, 1988	Dem	Chadron	Appointed by Governor Bob Kerrey
Bob Wickersham	(1991), 1992, 1996, 2000	Dem	Harrison	Appointed by Governor Ben Nelson
Fred Hlava	(2002)	Rep	Gordon	Appointed by Governor Mike Johanns
LeRoy Louden	2002, 2004, 2008	Rep	Ellsworth	
Moved to Sarpy County as part of the 2011 Redistricting
John Murante	2012, 2016	Rep	Gretna	Nebraska Treasurer
Andrew La Grone	(2019)	Rep	Gretna	Appointed by Governor Pete Ricketts; Husband of Julie Slama
Jen Day	2020	Dem	Gretna/Omaha	
Bob Andersen	2024	Rep	Omaha	
