= Fay Wood =

Fay Wood may refer to:

- Fay Wood (American football), American football player and coach
- Fay Wood (politician) (1889–1959), American politician from Nebraska
