= Senator Crosby =

Senator Crosby may refer to:

- Charles F. Crosby (1847–1889), Wisconsin State Senate
- Clarkson F. Crosby (1817–1858), New York State Senate
- Darius Crosby (1760s–1818), New York State Senate
- Elisha Oscar Crosby (1818–1895), California State Senate
- John Crawford Crosby (1859–1943), Massachusetts State Senate
- LaVon Crosby (1924–2016), Nebraska State Senate
- Moreau S. Crosby (1839–1893), Michigan State Senate
- Robert B. Crosby (1911–2000), Nebraska State Senate
