= Dudley Thompson =

Dudley Thompson may refer to:

- Dudley Thompson (Jamaican politician) (1917–2012), Jamaican politician
- Dudley E. Thompson (1909–1981), American politician from Nebraska
