= Senator Erdman =

Senator Erdman may refer to:

- Philip Erdman (born 1977), Nebraska State Senate
- Steve Erdman (born 1949), Nebraska State Senate
