= Fred Waggoner =

American politician (1895–1986)

Member of the Nebraska Legislature from the 29th district
- In office January 1, 1957 – January 6, 1959
- Preceded by: Robert Perry
- Succeeded by: Fern Hubbard Orme

Personal details
- Born: October 21, 1895 Fortescue, Missouri
- Died: March 7, 1986 (aged 90) Grand Island, Nebraska
- Party: Democratic
- Spouse: Gwen Meyerhoff (m. 1923)
- Education: Maryville State College; University of Nebraska
- Occupation: Life insurance agent, teacher

Fred Waggoner (October 21, 1895 – March 7, 1986) was a Democratic politician from Nebraska who served as a member of the Nebraska Legislature from the 29th district from 1957 to 1959.

== Early life ==
Waggoner was born in Fortescue, Missouri, in 1895, and attended Maryville State College and the University of Nebraska. He worked as a teacher and life insurance agent in Maryville, Missouri, and served in the U.S. Army during World War I and World War II. Waggoner moved to Lincoln, Nebraska, to serve as the regional insurance officer for the Veterans Administration. Waggoner later worked as a private insurance agent in Lincoln.

== Nebraska Legislature ==
In 1956, Waggoner ran for the state legislature from the 20th district, which was based in Lancaster County, after State Senator Robert Perry announced he would not seek re-election. Waggoner faced a crowded primary and placed second, winning 20 percent to Lincoln City Councilwoman Fern Hubbard Orme's 46 percent. They advanced to the general election, where Waggoner narrowly won, defeating Orme by 19 votes. Orme declined to seek a recount or election contest.

Waggoner ran for re-election in 1958, and was challenged by Orme, who filed abasing him in a rematch of their 1956 contest; businessman Donald DeVries; and Burlington Railroad employee V. J. Coffey. Waggoner placed third in the primary, receiving 25 percent of the vote to DeVries's 30 percent and Orme's 49 percent, one of three state senators statewide to lose in the primary election.

== Post-legislative career ==
Following Waggoner's defeat, he was one of four former state senators to oversee a recount of the 1958 gubernatorial election, along with fellow Democrat Frank Sorrell and Republicans Herbert Duis and Willard Waldo. However, several days after the recount began and Democratic Governor Ralph Brooks remained in the lead, the legislature abandoned the recount.

== Death ==
Waggoner died on March 7, 1986.
