= Opportunity, Nebraska =

- Unincorporated community
- Location within Nebraska Location within the United States
- Coordinates: 42°35′46″N 98°30′04″W
- Country: United States
- State: Nebraska
- County: Holt
- Elevation: 1,923 ft (586 m)
- Time zone: UTC-6 (Central (CST))
  - Summer (DST): UTC-5 (CDT)
- Zip code: 68763
- Area code: 402
- GNIS feature ID: 831884

Opportunity is an unincorporated community in Holt County, Nebraska, United States.

== History ==
Opportunity was so named because its founders saw a good opportunity to establish a post office and store there. The Opportunity post office operated between 1910 and 1942.

== Notable person ==
Fern Hubbard Orme (1903–1993), Nebraska state legislator and educator, was born in Opportunity.
