= John F. Doyle =

American politician (1892–1962)

Member of the Nebraska Legislature from the 29th district
- In office January 5, 1943 – January 4, 1949
- Preceded by: Joe Knezacek
- Succeeded by: Hugh Carson
- In office January 3, 1939 – January 7, 1941
- Preceded by: Tracy Frost
- Succeeded by: Joe Knezacek

Member of the Nebraska House of Representatives from the 65th district
- In office January 1, 1935 – January 5, 1937
- Preceded by: George W. O'Malley
- Succeeded by: Position abolished

Personal details
- Born: October 8, 1892 Greeley, Nebraska
- Died: December 19, 1962 (aged 70) Jacksonville, Florida
- Party: Democratic
- Spouse: Anne Agnes Dewhurst (m. 1920)
- Children: 3
- Occupation: Merchant, insurance

Military service
- Allegiance: United States
- Branch/service: United States Army
- Years of service: 1917–1918

John F. Doyle (October 8, 1892 – December 19, 1962) was a Democratic politician from Nebraska who served as a member of the Nebraska House of Representatives from the 65th district from 1935 to 1937 and as a member of the Nebraska Legislature from the 29th district from 1939 to 1941 and again from 1943 to 1949.

== Early life ==
Doyle was born in Greeley, Nebraska, on October 8, 1892. He graduated from Greeley High School, and served in the U.S. Army during World War I. Doyle owned and operated a grocery store in Greeley for forty years, and after retiring, he sold insurance. He served on the Greeley City Council and as chairman of the Greeley County Democratic Party.

== Nebraska Legislature ==
In 1934, Doyle ran to succeed former State Representative George O'Malley in the 65th district, which included Greeley and Wheeler counties. O'Malley, the former Speaker of the Nebraska House of Represntatives, resigned from the legislature in 1933 upon his appointment as the internal revenue collector in Omaha. In the Democratic primary, Doyle faced John A. Nealon, N. H. Teilmann, Ernest R. Murphy, and E. H. Hoefener. Doyle won the primary, receiving 32 percent of the vote. He advanced to the general election, where he faced C. M. Anderson, the Republican nominee, and narrowly won, receiving 53 percent of the vote to Anderson's 47 percent.

Effective with the 1936 election, the state legislature was consolidated from a bicameral body to a unicameral body. Doyle ran for re-election in the 29th district, which included Greeley, Howard, Valley, and Wheeler counties. In the nonpartisan primary, Doyle faced seven opponents: former State Representative E. H. Sorenson, former State Senator F. E. McCormick, State senator Homer Leggett, State Representative Tracy Frost, Stanley Mead, S. W. Roe, and J. W. Liberski. In the primary election, Doyle placed first, winning 24 percent of the vote, and he advanced to the general election with Frost, who narrowly placed second with 18 percent. In the general election, Frost narrowly defeated Doyle, winning 52 percent of the vote to Doyle's 48 percent.

Frost ran for re-election in 1938, and Doyle ran against him. Doyle placed first in the primary, winning 22 percent of the vote to Frost's 20 percent. They advanced to the general election, which Doyle won in a landslide, winning 64 percent of the vote to Frost's 34 percent.

Doyle ran for re-election to a second term in 1940. He was challenged by former Valley County Clerk Joe Knezacek and Charles Leftwich. Doyle placed first in the primary, receiving 45 percent of the vote to Knezacek's 41 percent and Leftwich's 14 percent. Knezacek narrowly defeated Doyle by a thin margin in the general election, receiving 53 percent of the vote to Doyle's 47 percent.

In 1942, Knezacek declined to seek re-election, and Doyle ran to succeed him. He faced former State Senator Tracy Frost and insurance agent E. C. James. Doyle won 45 percent of the vote in the primary, and advanced to the general election with James, who placed second with 32 percent. Doyle won re-election in the general election, defeating James, 55–45 percent.

Doyle ran for re-election in 1944. He was re-elected unopposed.

In 1946, Doyle sought another term, and was challenged by real estate broker Harold Conklin. In the primary election, Doyle narrowly placed first, receiving 53 percent of the vote to Conklin's 47 percent. In the general election, he defeated Conklin by 189 votes, receiving 51 percent of the vote to Conklin's 49 percent.

Doyle ran for another term in 1948, and faced a crowded field of opponents. Two of his former opponents, former State Senator Tracy Frost and Harold Conklin, filed to run against him, as did Ord City Councilman Hugh Carson. Doyle received 30 percent of the vote, and placed second in the primary to Carson, who received 37 percent of the vote. Carson defeated Doyle in the general election, winning 57 percent of the vote to Doyle's 43 percent.

In 1952, Doyle challenged Carson for re-election. In the primary, he faced former Greeley County Commissioner C. M. Anderson, Valley County Supervisor Bert Cummins, and farmer A. W. Krueger. Doyle placed a distant fourth in the primary, receiving 11 percent of the vote.

== Death ==
Doyle died on December 19, 1962, while spending the winter in Jacksonville, Florida, at his son's house.
