= John B. Peterson (Nebraska politician) =

American politician (1899–1974)

Member of the Nebraska Legislature from the 17th district
- In office January 5, 1937 – January 3, 1939
- Preceded by: Position created
- Succeeded by: M. E. Westley

Member of the Nebraska House of Representatives from the 30th district
- In office January 1, 1935 – January 5, 1937
- Preceded by: B. F. Balder
- Succeeded by: Position abolished

Personal details
- Born: August 12, 1899 Omaha, Nebraska
- Died: April 8, 1974 (aged 74) Lincoln, Nebraska
- Party: Republican
- Spouse: Inez M. Issac (m. 1935)
- Occupation: Truck farmer

John B. Peterson (August 12, 1899 – April 8, 1974) was a Republican politician from Nebraska who served as a member of the Nebraska House of Representatives from the 30th district from 1935 to 1937 and as a member of the Nebraska Legislature from the 17th district from 1937 to 1939.

== Early life ==
Peterson was born in Omaha, Nebraska, in 1899, and grew up in Ashland, graduating from Ashland High School. He operated a truck farm.

== Nebraska House of Representatives ==
In 1932, Peterson ran for the Nebraska House of Representatives from the 30th district, which was based in Saunders County, challenging incumbent State Representative Julius Olsen for re-election in the Republican primary. Peterson narrowly defeated Olesen to win the Republican nomination, and then faced Democrat B. F. Balder in the general election. Balder defeated Peterson with 56 percent of the vote.

Balder ran for re-election in 1934, and Peterson ran against him, and won the Republican primary. However, Balder lost the Democratic primary to Leon Wondra. In the general election, Peterson defeated Wondra with 57 percent of the vote.

== Nebraska Legislature ==
When the State House and State Senate were consolidated into the unicameral legislature in 1936, Peterson ran for the newly created 17th district. He faced seven candidates in the nonpartisan primary, and narrowly placed second, advancing to the general election with Louis Dolezal, the son of former State Senator Frank Dolezal and a Nebraska Democratic Party activist. In the general election, Peterson narrowly defeated Dolezal, winning 51 percent of the vote to Dolezal's 49 percent.

In 1938, Peterson ran for re-election. He ultimately placed sixth in the primary, winning just 10 percent of the vote. Clyde Worrall and M. E. Westley placed first and second, and in the general election, Westley was elected to succeed Peterson.

== Post-legislative career ==
After leaving the legislature, Peterson moved to Cass County, and ran for the legislature in 1944 from the 3rd district, challenging State Senator Tom Dooley for re-election. Peterson placed last in the primary, winning just 7 percent of the vote.

== Death ==
Peterson died on April 8, 1974.
