= Jerry Johnson (politician) =

American politician (born 1942)

Member of the Nebraska Legislature from the 23rd district
- In office January 9, 2013 – 2017
- Preceded by: Chris Langemeier
- Succeeded by: Bruce Bostelman

Personal details
- Born: November 23, 1942 (age 83) Holdrege, Nebraska, U.S.
- Education: Luther Junior College
- Website: johnsonforlegislature.com

Jerry Johnson (born November 23, 1942) is an American politician who served as a member of the Nebraska Legislature from the 23rd district. Johnson was previously the mayor of Wahoo.

Johnson was born in Holdrege, Nebraska. He attended Luther Junior College.

== Elections ==
- 2012 When Senator Chris Langemeier retired and left the District 23 seat open, Johnson placed first in the May 15, 2012 Primary election with 3,323 votes, and won the November 6, 2012 General election with 8,032 votes against Vern Barrett, who had previously run for the seat in 2008.
