= Leland Hall =

American politician (1894–1977)

Member of the Nebraska Legislature from the 31st district
- In office January 5, 1937 – January 7, 1941
- Preceded by: Position created
- Succeeded by: Harry Bowman

Member of the Nebraska State Senate from the 26th district
- In office October 28, 1935 – January 5, 1937
- Preceded by: Cloyd Stewart
- Succeeded by: Position abolished

Personal details
- Born: May 6, 1894 Elkhorn, Nebraska
- Died: March 3, 1977 (aged 82) Hastings, Nebraska
- Party: Democratic
- Spouse: Hazel A. Parks (m. 1920)
- Children: 2
- Education: Hastings College (A.B.)
- Occupation: Banker

Leland R. "Pink" Hall (May 6, 1894 – March 3, 1977) was a Democratic politician from Nebraska who served in the Nebraska State Senate from 1935 to 1937 and as a member of the Nebraska Legislature from the 31st district from 1937 to 1941.

== Early life ==
Hall was born in Elkhorn, Nebraska, in 1894. He graduated from Roseland High School and from Hastings College, receiving his bachelor's degree in 1915. Hall was a banker, and was the president of Rosalind State Bank from 1934 to 1947. He served as the Roseland Village Clerk and on the Roseland school board for several decades.

== Nebraska State Senate ==
In 1935, Cloyd Stewart, the President Pro Tempore of the Nebraska State Senate, resigned to serve as the head attorney on the Great Plains Shelterbelt project. Governor Robert Leroy Cochran appointed Hall to serve out the remaining year of Stewart's term in advance of a 1935 special legislative session.

== Nebraska Legislature ==
When the state legislature was reorganized into the unicameral legislature, Hall ran in the newly created 31st district. He faced a crowded field of opponents, and narrowly placed first in the primary. Hall advanced to the general election with Edwin Stratton, an insurance agent and member of the Hastings school board. He defeated Stratton with 55 percent of the vote.

Hall ran for re-election in 1938, and was challenged by Walter Burr, Roy Caswell, Donald Eisenhour, and former State Representative J. C. Gilmore. Hall placed first in the primary with 40 percent of the vote, and advanced to the runoff with Gilmore, who placed second with 18 percent. In the general election, Hall narrowly defeated Gilmore, winning re-election with 52 percent of the vote.

== 1940 State Treasurer campaign ==
In 1940, rather than seek re-election, Hall ran for State Treasurer. In the Democratic primary, he faced incumbent Treasurer John Havekost, who was appointed following the death of Truman W. Bass the previous year; former State Treasurer Walter Jensen; and D. T. Miller. Hall placed third in the primary, winning 24 percent of the vote to Jensen's 35 percent, and finishing 4 votes behind Havekost.

== Post-legislative career ==
Hall ran for the 31st district again in 1942, challenging State Senator Harry Bowman, who succeeded him in the legislature, for re-election. Hall placed first in the primary, winning 52 percent of the vote to Bowman's 48 percent, but narrowly lost the general election to Bowman, 49–51 percent.

== Death ==
Hall died on March 3, 1977.
