= Glenn Viehmeyer =

American politician (1900–1974)

Member of the Nebraska Legislature from the 45th district
- In office January 3, 1967 – January 6, 1969
- Preceded by: Ellen Craft
- Succeeded by: Ellen Craft

Personal details
- Born: December 3, 1900 Gandy, Nebraska
- Died: June 10, 1974 (aged 73) Gunnison, Colorado
- Party: Democratic
- Spouse: Catherine Kelley Smith (m. 1924)
- Children: 2 (Joyce, Robert)
- Occupation: Horticulturalist, farmer, forester

Glenn Viehmeyer (December 3, 1900 – June 10, 1974) was a Democratic politician and horticulturalist from Nebraska who served as a member of the Nebraska Legislature from the 45th district from 1967 to 1969.

== Early life ==
Viehmeyer was born in Gandy, Nebraska, in 1900, and graduated from Baker Rural High School in 1920. He worked as a farmer and rancher in Logan County from 1920 to 1935, and then joined the U.S. Forest Service as an assistant forester on the Great Plains Shelterbelt project from 1935 to 1940. Viehmeyer served as the superintendent of Niobrara State Park from 1940 to 1943. He joined the University of Nebraska's North Platte Experiment Station as a horticulturalist in 1943, and was well known for his research into Chrysanthemums, including breeding different varieties. He was appointed an assistant professor of horticulture, despite not having graduated from college.

== Nebraska Legislature ==
In 1966, Viehmeyer announced that he would run for the state legislature from the 45th district, which was based in Lincoln County. Following the death of State Senator Cecil Craft earlier in the year, a special election was held for the remaining two years of Craft's term. In the nonpartisan primary, Viehmeyer faced laundry operator Robert Gambs, North Platte City Councilman Bill Cooper, and former North Platte Mayor Andrew Larsen. Viehmeyer narrowly placed first, winning 32 percent of the vote to Gambs's 31 percent and Larsen's 27 percent. Viehmeyer and Gambs advanced to the general election, where Viehmeyer narrowly won, winning 51–49 percent.

During the 1968 legislative session, as the legislature adopted new congressional districts following court-ordered redistricting, Viehmeyer, a registered Democrat, criticized the lawsuit over the congressional districts, which was brought by Nebraska Democratic Party vice chairman J. James Exon, as "a matter of political expedience." He argued that the goal of the litigation was to "Make it a little easier for the Democrats" to win the 1st congressional district, and criticized the "maneuvering along political lines" during the legislative session.

Viehmeyer ran for a full term in 1968, and was challenged by C. E. Daly, a retired finance cooperative manager, and former State Senator Ellen Craft, who was appointed to serve out the remaining months of her husband's term in 1966. In the primary election, Viehmeyer placed third, receiving 28 percent of the vote to Craft's 37 percent and Daly's 35 percent, one of two state senators to lose renomination.

== Death ==
Viehmeyer died on June 10, 1974, in Gunnison, Colorado, while traveling to the National Council of State Garden Clubs meeting in Colorado.
