= Gerald Matzke =

American politician (1931–2024)

Member of the Nebraska Legislature from the 47th district
- In office 1993–2001
- Preceded by: Dennis Baack
- Succeeded by: Philip Erdman

Personal details
- Born: March 16, 1931 Seward, Nebraska, U.S.
- Died: September 5, 2024 (aged 93)
- Party: Republican
- Education: University of Nebraska; New York University

Gerald Matzke (March 16, 1931 – September 5, 2024) was an American politician. He served as a Republican member for the 47th district of the Nebraska Legislature.

== Life and career ==
Matzke was born in Seward, Nebraska on March 16, 1931. He attended the University of Nebraska and New York University.

Matzke served in the Nebraska Legislature from 1993 to 2001.

Matzke died on September 5, 2024, at the age of 93.
