= M. E. Westley =

American politician (1897–1966)

Member of the Nebraska Legislature from the 17th district
- In office January 3, 1939 – January 7, 1941
- Preceded by: John B. Peterson
- Succeeded by: Alfred Brodahl

Personal details
- Born: January 1897 Brainard, Nebraska
- Died: November 6, 1966 (aged 69) Omaha, Nebraska
- Party: Democratic
- Spouse: Leona P. Fischer (m. 1926)
- Education: Nebraska Wesleyan University
- Occupation: Farmer, teacher, restaurateur

Military service
- Allegiance: United States
- Branch/service: United States Army

Manley Earl Westley (January 1897 – November 6, 1966) was a Democratic politician from Nebraska who served as a member of the Nebraska Legislature from the 17th district from 1939 to 1941.

== Early life ==
Westley was born in Brainard, Nebraska, in 1897, and graduated from Brainard High School and Nebraska Wesleyan University. He was a teacher until he enlisted in the U.S. Army during World War I, and after returning from war, he farmed in Wyoming. Westley later operated a cafe in Brainard.

== Nebraska Legislature ==
In 1938, Westley ran for the Nebraska Legislature from the 17th district, challenging incumbent State Senator John B. Peterson for re-election. He ran in a crowded primary, and faced eight opponents, including Peterson, former State Representative W. G. Putney, and former Dakota County Attorney Clyde Worrall. Westley placed second in the primary, receiving 19 percent of the vote to Worrall's 20 percent, while Peterson placed sixth with 10 percent of the vote. In the general election, Westley defeated Worrall with 57 percent of the vote. Though the election was formally nonpartisan, Westley was a member of the Nebraska Democratic Party.

Westley ran for re-election in 1940, and was challenged by businessman Alfred Brodahl, Clarence Linch, and Horace Noland. Westley placed first in the primary with 38 percent of the vote and advanced to the general election with Brodahl, who received 33 percent. Brodahl ultimately defeated Westley with 55 percent of the vote.

In 1942, Westley challenged Brodahl for re-election. He placed second in the primary, receiving 27 percent of the vote to Brodahl's 48 percent and Joseph Kaspar's 25 percent. In the general election, Brodahl defeated Westley, 54–46 percent.

Westley challenged Brodahl again in 1944. Brodahl placed first in the primary over Westley, winning 61 percent of the vote to Westley's 39 percent, and won the general election with 56 percent of the vote.

== Death ==
Westley died on November 6, 1966.
