= Theodore McCosh =

American politician (1904–1985)

Member of the Nebraska Legislature from the 42nd district
- In office January 3, 1961 – January 1, 1963
- Preceded by: Terry Carpenter
- Succeeded by: Terry Carpenter

Personal details
- Born: January 4, 1904 Litchfield, Nebraska
- Died: June 13, 1985 (aged 81) Gering, Nebraska
- Party: Republican
- Spouse: Helen Bessie Howe (m. 1930)
- Children: 3 (Joyce Lavender, Donald E., Eunice Mae)
- Education: University of Nebraska
- Occupation: Pharmacist, drug store owner

Theodore McCosh (January 4, 1904 – June 13, 1985) was a Republican politician from Nebraska who served as a member of the Nebraska Legislature from the 42nd district from 1961 to 1963.

== Early life ==
McCosh was born in Litchfield, Nebraska, in 1904, and later attended the University of Nebraska School of Pharmacy, graduating in 1928. He opened a drug store in Gering and served on the Gering Board of Education.

== Nebraska Legislature ==
In 1960, when State Senator Terry Carpenter opted to run for Governor rather than seek re-election, McCosh ran to succeed him in the 42nd district, which was based in Scotts Bluff County. In the nonpartisan primary, McCosh faced automobile dealer Robert Kramer, retired U.S. Army officer Paul Britt, and farmer Melvin Bennett. In the primary election, McCosh placed first, winning 34 percent of the vote to Kramer's 29 percent, and the two advanced to the general election. McCosh narrowly defeated Kramer, winning 52–48 percent.

McCosh ran for re-election in 1962, and was challenged by Carpenter. McCosh narrowly placed first in the primary, winning 51 percent of the vote to Carpenter's 49 percent. In the general election, however, Carpenter unseated McCosh in a landslide, winning 67 percent of the vote.

== Death ==
McCosh died on June 13, 1985.
