= Lester Dunn =

American politician (1890–1971)

Member of the Nebraska Legislature from the 20th district
- In office January 5, 1937 – January 7, 1941
- Preceded by: Position created
- Succeeded by: C. Petrus Peterson

Member of the Nebraska House of Representatives from the 36th district
- In office January 1, 1935 – January 5, 1937
- Preceded by: Sarah Muir
- Succeeded by: Position abolished

Personal details
- Born: November 29, 1890 Atlantic, Iowa
- Died: September 7, 1971 (aged 80) Lincoln, Nebraska
- Party: Republican
- Spouse: Aetna Catkin (m. 1919)
- Education: Valparaiso University; University of Nebraska (LL.B.)
- Occupation: Attorney

Lester Lloyd Dunn (November 29, 1890 – September 7, 1971) was a Republican politician from Nebraska who served as a member of the Nebraska House of Representatives from the 36th district from 1935 to 1937 and as a member of the Nebraska Legislature from the 20th district from 1937 to 1941.

== Early life ==
Dunn was born in Atlantic, Iowa, in 1890, and moved to Nebraska in 1910. He attended Valparaiso University and graduated from the University of Nebraska with his bachelor of laws degree. He was the chief of the bureau of workmen's compensation and served as counsel to the commissioner from 1920 to 1923, and later practiced as an attorney in Lincoln.

== Nebraska House of Representatives ==
In 1934, State Representative Sarah Muir announced that she would seek the Republican nomination for the U.S. House of Representatives from the 1st congressional district, and Dunn ran to succeed her in the Nebraska House of Representatives in the 36th district. He won the Republican primary, and then defeated Democratic nominee John O. Chapman in the general election with 55 percent of the vote.

== Nebraska Legislature ==
Following the consolidation of the State House and State Senate into the unicameral legislature, Dunn ran to represent the newly created 20th district in 1936. In the nonpartisan primary, he faced civic activist Freda Davis, attorney G. E. Price, and State Representative Henry Obbink. Dunn placed first in the primary, and proceeded to the general election with Obbink. He won the general election by a wide margin, defeating Obbink with 63 percent of the vote.

In 1938, Dunn ran for re-election. He was challenged by furniture company owner Philip Hardy, teacher Julius Humann, attorney O. W. Miller, and insurance broker Charles Sutherland. Dunn placed first in the primary, winning 35 percent of the vote, and proceeded to the general election with Hardy, who placed second with 25 percent. In the general election, Dunn ultimately defeated Hardy.

Dunn declined to seek re-election in 1940.

== Lincoln City Council ==
In 1944, when Lincoln City Councilman Joe Iverson left his position to serve in the U.S. Army, Dunn was appointed to serve as his temporary replacement. He ended up serving out the remainder of Iverson's term, and ran for a full term in one of the three at-large seats in 1945. Dunn won, placing first in both the primary and general election. Dunn did not seek re-election in 1949.

== Death ==
Dunn died on September 7, 1971.
