= Alfred Brodahl =

American politician (1890–1975)

Member of the Nebraska Legislature from the 17th district
- In office January 7, 1941 – January 7, 1947
- Preceded by: M. E. Westley
- Succeeded by: Owen Person

Personal details
- Born: December 27, 1890 Wahoo, Nebraska
- Died: September 10, 1975 (aged 84) Omaha, Nebraska
- Party: Republican
- Spouse: Ruth C. Ericson (m. 1916)
- Children: 2
- Education: Luther College
- Occupation: Automobile dealer

Alfred J. Brodahl (December 27, 1890 – September 10, 1975) was a Republican politician from Nebraska who served as a member of the Nebraska Legislature from the 17th district from 1941 to 1947.

== Early life ==
Brodahl died in Wahoo, Nebraska, in 1890, to parents who had immigrated from Sweden in 1870. He attended grade school in Wahoo and later Luther College. He operated a Ford dealership and garage.

== Nebraska Legislature ==
In 1940, Brodahl ran for the Nebraska Legislature from the 17th district, challenging incumbent State Senator M. E. Westley for re-election. Brodahl placed second in the primary, receiving 33 percent of the vote, and advanced to the general election with Westley, who placed first with 38 percent. In the general election, Brodahl defeated Westley, winning 55 percent of the vote to Westley's 45 percent.

Bordahl ran for re-election in 1942, and was challenged by Westley in a rematch of their 1940 campaign. Brodahl received 48 percent of the vote to Westley's 27 percent and Joseph Kaspar's 25 percent, and proceeded to the general election with Westley. Brodahl won a second term, defeating Westley with 54 percent of the vote.

In 1944, Brodahl ran for re-election to a third term. Brodahl placed first over Westley in the primary election by a wide margin, receiving 61 percent of the vote to Westley's 39 percent. He defeated Westley in the general election, 56–44 percent. Brodahl declined to seek re-election in 1946.

== Death ==
Brodahl died on September 10, 1975.
