= Joe Knezacek =

American politician (1889–1982)

Member of the Nebraska Legislature from the 29th district
- In office January 7, 1941 – January 5, 1943
- Preceded by: John F. Doyle
- Succeeded by: John F. Doyle

Personal details
- Born: March 17, 1889 Omaha, Nebraska
- Died: June 3, 1982 (aged 93) Grand Island, Nebraska
- Party: Republican
- Spouse: Bertha Radil (m. 1913)
- Occupation: Abstractor

Joseph T. Knezacek (March 17, 1889 – June 3, 1982) was a Republican politician from Nebraska who served as a member of the Nebraska Legislature from the 29th district from 1941 to 1943.

== Early life ==
Knezacek was born in Omaha, Nebraska, in 1889. He worked for Union Pacific Railroad as a depot agent. Knezacek was elected Valley County Clerk in 1918 as the Republican nominee and served until 1927. In 1930, he opened his own abstracting firm.

== Nebraska Legislature ==
In 1940, Knezacek ran for the Nebraska Legislature from the 20th district, challenging incumbent State Senator John F. Doyle for re-election. Knezacek placed second in the primary, receiving 41 percent of the vote to Doyle's 45 percent and Charles Leftwich's 14 percent. In the general election, Knezacek defeated Doyle, winning 53 percent of the vote.

Knezacek declined to run for re-election in 1942.

== Death ==
Knezacek died on June 3, 1982.
