= Hugh Carson =

Hugh Carson may refer to:

- Hugh Francis Carson (1926–2012), Northern Irish comedian and actor
- Hugh A. Carson (died 1913), delegate to Alabama's 1875 Constitutional Convention
- Ken Carson (country singer) (1914–1994), also known as Hugh Carson, American singer, songwriter, musician and film performer
