= Chris Langemeier =

American politician

Member of the Nebraska Legislature from the 23rd district
- In office 2005–2013
- Preceded by: Curt Bromm
- Succeeded by: Jerry Johnson

Personal details
- Born: Schuyler, Nebraska
- Party: Republican
- Education: University of Nebraska–Lincoln

Chris Langemeier was a member of the Nebraska Legislature in the United States.

== Personal life ==
He was born in Schuyler, Nebraska and graduated from Schuyler Central High School and the University of Nebraska–Lincoln. He held many positions in the Lower Platte North Natural Resources District. He is a real estate broker.

== State legislature ==
He was elected in 2004 to represent the 23rd Nebraska legislative district. He served as the chairman of the Natural Resources committee and was a member of the Banking, Commerce and Insurance committee; the executive board of the Legislative Council; and the Intergovernmental Cooperation committee.
