= 2020 Nebraska Legislature election =

- November 3, 2020; Officially nonpartisan

25 of the 49 seats in the Nebraska Legislature 25 (Note: In Nebraska, a two-thirds vote of all members is required to overcome a filibuster. Thus, 33 votes are required to hold a filibuster-proof majority.) seats needed for a majority
	Majority party	Minority party	Third party
	Rep	Dem
Leader	Jim Scheer (term-limited)	None	Ernie Chambers (term-limited)
Party	Republican	Democratic	Independent
Leader since	January 4, 2017
Leader's seat	19th district
Seats before	30	18	1
Seats won	32	17	0
Seat change	▲2	▼1	▼1
Popular vote	245,639	166,676
Percentage	58.98%	40.02%
- Democratic gain Republican gain Democratic hold Republican hold 50–60% 60–70% 70–80% >90% 50–60% 60–70% 70–80% >90%
Speaker before election
Jim Scheer
Republican
Elected Speaker
Mike Hilgers
Republican

The 2020 Nebraska State Legislature elections took place as part of the biennial United States elections. Nebraska voters elected state senators (Note: Although Nebraska's legislature is unicameral, the officeholders are called Senators.) in the 25 odd-numbered seats of the 49 (Note: The even-numbered districts were elected in 2018 and will be up for election again in 2022.) legislative districts in the Nebraska Unicameral. State senators serve four-year terms in the unicameral Nebraska Legislature.

A top two primary election on May 12, 2020 determined which candidates appear on the November 3 general election ballot. Each candidate technically runs as a non-partisan (i.e., no party preference). The Nebraska State Legislature's website offers a statewide map of the 49 legislative districts here and maps for each individual district can be found on the website.

Following the 2018 elections, the Republicans maintained effective control of the Nebraska State Legislature with 30 seats. The Democrats increased their numbers from 16 to 18.

Republicans flipped three seats from Democrats; Democrats flipped one seat from Republicans and one from nonpartisan Ernie Chambers.

== Open seats that changed parties ==
=== Democratic seats won by Republicans ===
1. District 31: Won by Rich Pahls.
2. District 45: Won by Rita Sanders.

=== Nonpartisan seats won by Democrats ===
1. District 11: Won by Terrell McKinney.

== Incumbents defeated ==
=== In general elections ===
==== Democrats ====
1. District 35: Dan Quick (elected in 2016) lost to Raymond Aguilar.

==== Republicans ====
1. District 49: Andrew LaGrone (appointed in 2019) lost to Jen Day.

== Predictions ==
Source	Ranking	As of
The Cook Political Report	Safe R	October 21, 2020

== Close races ==
District	Winner	Party	Margin
3	Carol Blood	Democratic	0.8%
49	Jen Day	Democratic (flip)	1.0%
31	Rich Pahls	Republican (flip)	5.4%
29	Eliot Bostar	Democratic	6.2%
35	Raymond Aguilar	Republican (flip)	7.2%
45	Rita Sanders	Republican (flip)	7.6%
9	John Cavanaugh	Democratic	8.2%
21	Mike Hilgers	Republican	9.92%

== Detailed results ==
- Note: All elections are technically non-partisan in the State Legislature; therefore, parties listed here are from candidates' websites and official party endorsement lists. Candidates all appear on the ballot as nonpartisan.
  - Candidates endorsed by the Republican Party:
  - Candidates endorsed by the Democratic Party:

=== District 1 ===
Nebraska's 1st Legislative District Election, 2020
Primary election
Party	Candidate	Votes	%
Republican	Julie Slama (incumbent)	6,553	60.5
Republican	Janet Palmtag	2,244	20.7
Republican	Dennis Schaardt	1,954	18.0
Total votes		10,751	100.0
General election
Republican	Julie Slama (incumbent)	12,033	68.1
Republican	Janet Palmtag	5,627	31.9
Total votes		17,660	100.0
Republican hold			

=== District 3 ===
Nebraska's 3rd Legislative District Election, 2020
Primary election
Party	Candidate	Votes	%
Democratic	Carol Blood (incumbent)	4,851	57.1
Republican	Rick Holdcroft	3,646	42.9
Total votes		8,497	100.0
General election
Democratic	Carol Blood (incumbent)	9,196	50.4
Republican	Rick Holdcroft	9,036	49.6
Total votes		18,232	100.0
Democratic hold			

=== District 5 ===
Nebraska's 5th Legislative District Election, 2020
Primary election
Party	Candidate	Votes	%
Democratic	Mike McDonnell (incumbent)	3,578	70.0
Republican	Gilbert Ayala	1,536	30.0
Total votes		5,114	100.0
General election
Democratic	Mike McDonnell (incumbent)	6,947	63.2
Republican	Gilbert Ayala	4,053	36.8
Total votes		11,000	100.0
Democratic hold			

=== District 7 ===
Nebraska's 7th Legislative District Election, 2020
Primary election
Party	Candidate	Votes	%
Democratic	Tony Vargas (incumbent)	3,281	81.8
Republican	Jorge Sotolongo	731	18.1
Total votes		4,012	100.0
General election
Democratic	Tony Vargas (incumbent)	7,386	77.9
Republican	Jorge Sotolongo	2,098	22.1
Total votes		9,484	100.0
Democratic hold			

=== District 9 ===
Sara Howard (incumbent) was term-limited.

Nebraska's 9th Legislative District Election, 2020
Primary election
Party	Candidate	Votes	%
Democratic	John Cavanaugh	3,911	46.0
Democratic	Marque Snow	3,435	40.4
Democratic	Mark Vondrasek	1,152	13.6
Total votes		8,498	100.0
General election
Democratic	John Cavanaugh	8,461	54.1
Democratic	Marque Snow	7,170	45.9
Total votes		15,631	100.0
Democratic hold			

=== District 11 ===
Ernie Chambers (incumbent) was term-limited.

Nebraska's 11th Legislative District Election, 2020
Primary election
Party	Candidate	Votes	%
Democratic	Fred Conley	1,444	35.1
Democratic	Terrell McKinney	767	18.7
Democratic	Dennis Womack	611	14.9
Democratic	Teela Mickles	503	12.2
Democratic	Gwen Easter	346	8.4
Democratic	Cornelius Williams	300	7.3
Republican	John Sciara	139	3.4
Total votes		4,110	100.0
General election
Democratic	Terrell McKinney	6,359	63.8
Democratic	Fred Conley	3,601	36.2
Total votes		9,960	100.0
Democratic gain from Independent Democrat			

=== District 13 ===
Nebraska's 13th Legislative District Election, 2020
Primary election
Party	Candidate	Votes	%
Democratic	Justin Wayne (incumbent)	6,477	100.0
Total votes		6,477	100.0
General election
Democratic	Justin Wayne (incumbent)	11,771	100.0
Total votes		11,771	100.0
Democratic hold			

=== District 15 ===
Results by precinct: Walz: 50–60%; 60–70%; Rogers: 50–60%; 60–70%

Nebraska's 15th Legislative District Election, 2020
Primary election
Party	Candidate	Votes	%
Democratic	Lynne Walz (incumbent)	6,197	68.7
Republican	David Rogers	2,817	31.3
Total votes		9,014	100.0
General election
Democratic	Lynne Walz (incumbent)	9,186	59.6
Republican	David Rogers	6,223	40.4
Total votes		15,409	100.0
Democratic hold			

=== District 17 ===
Nebraska's 17th Legislative District Election, 2020
Primary election
Party	Candidate	Votes	%
Republican	Joni Albrecht (incumbent)	3,963	72.7
Democratic	Sheryl Lindau	1,489	27.3
Total votes		5,452	100.0
General election
Republican	Joni Albrecht (incumbent)	8,310	68.0
Democratic	Sheryl Lindau	3,907	32.0
Total votes		12,217	100.0
Republican hold			

=== District 19 ===
Jim Scheer (incumbent) was term-limited.

Nebraska's 19th Legislative District Election, 2020
Primary election
Party	Candidate	Votes	%
Republican	Mike Flood	8,346	100.0
Total votes		8,346	100.0
General election
Republican	Mike Flood	15,519	100.0
Total votes		15,519	100.0
Republican hold			

=== District 21 ===
Nebraska's 21st Legislative District Election, 2020
Primary election
Party	Candidate	Votes	%
Republican	Mike Hilgers (incumbent)	5,150	59.1
Democratic	Brodey Weber	2,379	27.3
Democratic	Joseph Couch	1,184	13.6
Total votes		8,713	100.0
General election
Republican	Mike Hilgers (incumbent)	10,157	54.96
Democratic	Brodey Weber	8,325	45.04
Total votes		18,482	100.0
Republican hold			

=== District 23 ===
Nebraska's 23rd Legislative District Election, 2020
Primary election
Party	Candidate	Votes	%
Republican	Bruce Bostelman (incumbent)	5,703	62.4
Democratic	Helen Raikes	3,430	37.6
Total votes		9,133	100.0
General election
Republican	Bruce Bostelman (incumbent)	11,337	62.1
Democratic	Helen Raikes	6,905	37.9
Total votes		18,242	100.0
Republican hold			

=== District 25 ===
Nebraska's 25th Legislative District Election, 2020
Primary election
Party	Candidate	Votes	%
Republican	Suzanne Geist (incumbent)	10,407	71.5
Democratic	Stephany Pleasant	4,151	28.5
Total votes		14,558	100.0
General election
Republican	Suzanne Geist (incumbent)	16,443	66.7
Democratic	Stephany Pleasant	8,207	33.3
Total votes		24,650	100.0
Republican hold			

=== District 27 ===
Nebraska's 27th Legislative District Election, 2020
Primary election
Party	Candidate	Votes	%
Democratic	Anna Wishart (incumbent)	5,803	71.3
Republican	Brenda Bickford	2,340	28.7
Total votes		8,143	100.0
General election
Democratic	Anna Wishart (incumbent)	10,173	64.4
Republican	Brenda Bickford	5,612	35.6
Total votes		15,785	100.0
Democratic hold			

=== District 29 ===
Results by precinct: Bostar: 50–60%; 60–70%; 70–80%; Campbell: 50–60%; 60–70%

Kate Bolz (incumbent) was term-limited.

Nebraska's 29th Legislative District Election, 2020
Primary election
Party	Candidate	Votes	%
Republican	Jacob Campbell	3,886	32.4
Democratic	Eliot Bostar	3,236	27.0
Democratic	Jennifer Carter	2,702	22.5
Democratic	Neal Clayburn	1,023	8.5
Republican	Lisa Lee	881	7.3
Nonpartisan	Michael Connely	263	2.2
Total votes		11,991	100.0
General election
Democratic	Eliot Bostar	11,167	53.1
Republican	Jacob Campbell	9,869	46.9
Total votes		21,036	100.0
Democratic hold			

=== District 31 ===
Rick Kolowski (incumbent) retired.

Nebraska's 31st Legislative District Election, 2020
Primary election
Party	Candidate	Votes	%
Republican	Rich Pahls	4,156	37.9
Democratic	Tim Royers	3,925	35.8
Democratic	Melanie Williams	1,487	13.6
Republican	Mark Gruenewald	1,069	9.7
Democratic	Alexander Martin	337	3.1
Total votes		10,974	100.0
General election
Republican	Rich Pahls	10,727	52.8
Democratic	Tim Royers	9,608	47.2
Total votes		20,335	100.0
Republican gain from Democratic			

=== District 33 ===
Nebraska's 33rd Legislative District Election, 2020
Primary election
Party	Candidate	Votes	%
Republican	Steve Halloran (incumbent)	6,653	100.0
Total votes		6,653	100.0
General election
Republican	Steve Halloran	12,893	100.0
Total votes		12,893	100.0
Republican hold			

=== District 35 ===
Nebraska's 35th Legislative District Election, 2020
Primary election
Party	Candidate	Votes	%
Democratic	Dan Quick (incumbent)	4,009	62.5
Republican	Raymond Aguilar	2,401	37.5
Total votes		6,410	100.0
General election
Republican	Raymond Aguilar	6,683	53.6
Democratic	Dan Quick (incumbent)	5,777	46.4
Total votes		12,460	100.0
Republican gain from Democratic			

=== District 37 ===
Nebraska's 37th Legislative District Election, 2020
Primary election
Party	Candidate	Votes	%
Republican	John Lowe (incumbent)	6,286	77.1
Libertarian	Mercadies Damratowski	1,865	22.9
Total votes		8,151	100.0
General election
Republican	John Lowe (incumbent)	12,903	75.7
Libertarian	Mercadies Damratowski	4,134	24.3
Total votes		17,037	100.0
Republican hold			

=== District 39 ===
Nebraska's 39th Legislative District Election, 2020
Primary election
Party	Candidate	Votes	%
Republican	Lou Ann Linehan (incumbent)	8,355	61.7
Independent Democrat	Allison Heimes	5,176	38.3
Total votes		13,531	100.0
General election
Republican	Lou Ann Linehan (incumbent)	15,367	56.0
Independent Democrat	Allison Heimes	12,087	44.0
Total votes		27,454	100.0
Republican hold			

=== District 41 ===
Nebraska's 41st Legislative District Election, 2020
Primary election
Party	Candidate	Votes	%
Republican	Tom Briese (incumbent)	8,355	100.0
Total votes		8,355	100.0
General election
Republican	Tom Briese (incumbent)	15,855	100.0
Total votes		15,855	100.0
Republican hold			

=== District 43 ===
Nebraska's 43rd Legislative District Election, 2020
Primary election
Party	Candidate	Votes	%
Republican	Tom Brewer (incumbent)	8,043	61.2
Republican	Tanya Storer	5,100	38.8
Total votes		13,143	100.0
General election
Republican	Tom Brewer (incumbent)	10,688	57.9
Republican	Tanya Storer	7,760	42.1
Total votes		18,448	100.0
Republican hold			

=== District 45 ===
Sue Crawford (incumbent) was term-limited.

Nebraska's 45th Legislative District Election, 2020
Primary election
Party	Candidate	Votes	%
Democratic	Susan Hester	4,158	51.0
Republican	Rita Sanders	3,999	49.0
Total votes		8,157	100.0
General election
Republican	Rita Sanders	9,224	53.8
Democratic	Susan Hester	7,919	46.2
Total votes		17,143	100.0
Republican gain from Democratic			

=== District 47 ===
Nebraska's 47th Legislative District Election, 2020
Primary election
Party	Candidate	Votes	%
Republican	Steve Erdman (incumbent)	4,158	100.0
Total votes		4,158	100.0
General election
Republican	Steve Erdman (incumbent)	14,964	100.0
Total votes		14,964	100.0
Republican hold			

=== District 49 ===
Results by precinct: Day: 50–60%; 60–70%; LaGrone: 50–60%

John Murante (elected in 2016) resigned when elected Treasurer of Nebraska in 2018. Governor Pete Ricketts appointed Andrew LaGrone to fill the vacancy.

Nebraska's 49th Legislative District Election, 2020
Primary election
Party	Candidate	Votes	%
Democratic	Jen Day	5,414	53.1
Republican	Andrew LaGrone (incumbent)	4,787	46.9
Total votes		10,201	100.0
General election
Democratic	Jen Day	12,524	50.5
Republican	Andrew LaGrone (incumbent)	12,258	49.5
Total votes		24,782	100.0
Democratic gain from Republican			
