= Ellen Craft (Nebraska politician) =

American politician (died 1996)

Member of the Nebraska Legislature from the 45th district
- In office January 6, 1969 – January 2, 1973
- Preceded by: Glenn Viehmeyer
- Succeeded by: Frank Lewis (redistricted)
- In office March 18, 1966 – January 3, 1967
- Preceded by: Cecil Craft
- Succeeded by: Glenn Viehmeyer

Personal details
- Born: November 5, 1904 North Platte, Nebraska
- Died: June 21, 1996 (aged 91) North Platte, Nebraska
- Spouse: Cecil Craft (m. 1933; died 1966)
- Children: 4 (Cecil Jr., John Charles, Thomas Eric, Susan Ann)
- Education: University of Nebraska
- Occupation: Teacher, secretary

Ellen Craft (née Erickson, November 5, 1904 – June 21, 1996) was a Republican politician from Nebraska who served as a member of the Nebraska Legislature from the 45th district from 1966 to 1967, completing the term of her late husband Cecil Craft, and again from 1969 to 1973.

== Early life ==
Ellen Erickson was born in 1904 in North Platte, Nebraska, and graduated from North Platte High School, later attending the University of Nebraska, where she was a member of the Phi Mu sorority. She married Cecil Craft in 1933, and was active in North Platte civic organizations. During Cecil's service in World War II, she operated the family's bottling company. Cecil was elected to the Nebraska Legislature in 1960, and re-elected in 1962 and 1964.

== Nebraska Legislature ==
On March 1, 1966, Craft's husband, Cecil, died of a heart attack in Lincoln. Governor Frank B. Morrison appointed Craft to serve until a special election could be held later in the year, and she declined to run in the election. She was sworn in on March 18, 1966.

In 1968, Craft announced that she would challenge State Senator Glenn Viehmeyer, who won the 1966 special election, for re-election. She placed first in the primary election, winning 37 percent of the vote to C. E. Daly's 35 percent, while Viehmeyer placed third with 28 percent. She advanced to the general election against Daly, a retired finance cooperative manager, where she narrowly won, receiving 51 percent of the vote to Daly's 49 percent.

Craft declined to seek re-election in 1972, and following redistricting, her district was eliminated.

== Post-legislative career ==
Following her departure from the legislature, Craft remained politically active, serving as the president of the Lincoln County Republican Women. In 1978, the Craft State Office Building was dedicated to Ellen and Cecil.

== Death ==
Craft died on June 21, 1996.
