= Alois Slepicka =

American politician (1875–1964)

Member of the Nebraska Legislature from the 23rd district
- In office January 5, 1937 – January 3, 1939
- Preceded by: Position created
- Succeeded by: John Mekota

Member of the Nebraska State Senate from the 18th district
- In office January 1, 1935 – January 5, 1937
- Preceded by: Andy J. Welch
- Succeeded by: Position abolished

Personal details
- Born: February 13, 1875 Saline County, Nebraska
- Died: December 29, 1964 (aged 89) Crete, Nebraska
- Party: Democratic
- Spouse: Antonie Melichor (m. 1895)
- Occupation: Insurance salesman

Alois Slepicka (February 13, 1875 – December 29, 1964) was a Democratic politician from Nebraska who served in the Nebraska State Senate from 1935 to 1937 and as a member of the Nebraska Legislature from the 23rd district from 1937 to 1939.

== Early life ==
Slepicka was born in Saline County, Nebraska, in 1875, and worked an insurance agent. He served as mayor of Wilber for eight years and was elected to a four-year term as Saline County Clerk.

== Nebraska State Senate ==
In 1934, when State Senator Andy J. Welch declined to seek re-election, Slepicka ran to succeed him in the 18th district, which included Saline and Seward counties. He narrowly won the Democratic primary over State Representative Robert C. Vance, receiving 46 percent of the vote to Vance's 42 percent. In the general election, he defeated Republican E. J. Spirk with 54 percent of the vote.

== Nebraska Legislature ==
When the State Senate and State House were consolidated into the unicameral legislature in 1936, Slepicka ran in the newly created 23rd district. He faced a crowded primary that included State Representatives Ben Busboom and Claire Owens, former State Representative Frank Freeouf, and F. E. Craig, Charles McEachran, and James O'Boyle. Owen and Slepicka advanced to the general election, which Slepicka won, defeating Owens with 52 percent of the vote.

Slepicka ran for re-election in 1938, but was defeated in the primary election, winning only 13 percent of the vote.

== Death ==
Slepicka died on December 29, 1964.
