= Fern Hubbard Orme =

American politician and educator

Fern Hubbard Orme (April 17, 1903 – March 17, 1993) was an American politician and educator in Nebraska.

Orme was born in Opportunity, Nebraska and went to the public schools in O'Neill, Nebraska. Orme received her bachelor's and master's degrees in English and drama, from the University of Nebraska. She taught at the University of Nebraska and at Irving Junior High School in Lincoln, Nebraska. She received the Nebraska Builders Award from the University of Nebraska.

Orme served on the Lincoln City Council from 1946 to 1956 and was involved with the Republican Party. Orme served in the Nebraska Legislature from 1958 until 1972. As a legislator, Orme pushed for Nebraska's Endorsement of the Equal Rights Amendment to the U.S. Constitution. She also co-sponsored LB 446, a bill to prevent corporal punishment in schools, with Senator Ernie Chambers of Omaha in 1971.

After she lost re-election in 1972, Orme retired and moved to Fort Myers, Florida where she died.
