= Philip Erdman =

American politician

Member of the Nebraska Legislature from the 47th district
- In office January 3, 2001 – January 7, 2009
- Preceded by: Gerald Matzke
- Succeeded by: Ken Schilz

Personal details
- Born: April 7, 1977 (age 49) Scottsbluff, Nebraska, U.S.
- Party: Republican
- Education: University of Nebraska–Lincoln

Philip Erdman (born 1977) is a politician from the U.S. state of Nebraska. A member of the Republican Party, Erdman served in the Nebraska Legislature from 2001 to 2009. He works as a credit analyst and appraiser.

== Personal life ==
He was born on April 7, 1977, in Scottsbluff, Nebraska, and graduated from Bayard High School as valedictorian in 1996. He then graduated from University of Nebraska–Lincoln in agricultural sciences in 2000. He went on to work for Farmland Industries, and as a football recruiter for UNL Athletic Department. He is a member of Future Farmers of America, both Cheyenne County and Kimball/Banner County chamber of commerce, and a delegate to local Republican conventions.

== State legislature ==
He was elected in 2000 to represent the 47th Nebraska legislative district and reelected in 2004. He sat on the General Affairs, Health and Human Services, Nebraska Retirement Systems, Executive Board, Reference, and the Legislative Performance Audit committees as well as being the vice chairperson of the Agriculture committee.
