= LaVon Crosby =

American politician

LaVon K. Crosby (April 25, 1924 – July 27, 2016) was an American politician.

Born in Hastings, Nebraska, Crosby graduated from St. Cecilia's High School in Hastings, Nebraska in 1941. She graduated from University of Nebraska in 1987. In 1971, Crosby married former Nebraska Governor Robert B. Crosby. Crosby served in the Nebraska State Legislature from 1988 to 2000 and was a Republican.
