= Fay Wood (politician) =

American politician (1889–1959)

Member of the Nebraska Legislature from the 24th district
- In office January 1, 1957 – January 6, 1959
- Preceded by: Herbert Diers
- Succeeded by: Herbert Diers
- In office January 2, 1945 – January 2, 1951
- Preceded by: Stanley Matzke
- Succeeded by: Herbert Diers

Personal details
- Born: 1889 Maryville, Missouri
- Died: February 19, 1959 (aged 70) Seward, Nebraska
- Party: Republican
- Spouse: Theo Campbell (m. 1914)
- Children: 1
- Occupation: Funeral director

Fayette H. Wood (1889 – February 19, 1959) was a Republican politician from Nebraska who served as a member of the Nebraska Legislature from the 24th district from 1945 to 1951 and again from 1957 to 1959.

== Early life ==
Wood was born in Maryville, Missouri, in 1889, and settled in Seward, Nebraska, in 1914. He operated a funeral home and served as vice president of the Seward Building and Loan Association. In 1938, he was elected mayor of Seward.

== Nebraska Legislature ==
In 1944, State Senator Stanley Matzke declined to run for re-election. Wood ran to succeed him in the 24th district, and was elected unopposed. He was re-elected unopposed in 1946.

Wood ran for re-election to a third term in 1948 and was challenged by former York County Attorney Oden Gilmore and former State Senator Andy Welch. Wood placed first in the primary with 48 percent of the vote, and advanced to the general election with Gilmore, who placed second with 30 percent. Wood ultimately defeated Gilmore with 55 percent of the vote. He did not seek a fourth term in 1950.

In 1951, after leaving the legislature, Wood sought the Republican nomination in the special election to succeed deceased Congressman Karl Stefan. However, Wood withdrew as a candidate prior to the Nebraska Republican Party convention to select the party's nominee in the special election.

When State Senator Herbert Diers, who was elected to succeed Wood in 1950, declined to seek a fourth term in 1956, Wood announced that he would run. In the primary, Wood faced former State Senator William H. Diers, the brother of the retiring legislator, and farmer Dwight Walkup. In a close race, Walkup and Wood each received 34 percent of the vote, with Walkup receiving 21 more votes than Wood, and they advanced to the general election, while Diers received 32 percent. Wood defeated Walkup with 59 percent of the vote in the general election.

Wood ran for re-election in 1958. He was challenged by former State Senator Herbert Diers, Walkup, Oscar Swanson, and David Patterson. Wood was narrowly defeated in the primary; he received 26 percent of the vote to Diers's 28 percent and Walkup's 27 percent, and finished 26 votes behind Walkup.

== Death ==
Wood died on February 19, 1959.
