= Dudley E. Thompson =

American politician (1909–1981)

Dudley Thompson

Member of the Nebraska Legislature from the 26th district
- In office January 5, 1943 – January 2, 1945
- Preceded by: Tom Lambert
- Succeeded by: Ed Lusienski

Personal details
- Born: April 30, 1909 Fullerton, Nebraska
- Died: March 5, 1981 (aged 71) Wheaton, Maryland
- Party: Democratic
- Spouse: Dorothy E. Smyth (m. 1938)
- Children: 2
- Education: Hastings College; University of Nebraska (LL.B.)
- Occupation: Attorney

Military service
- Allegiance: United States
- Branch/service: United States Navy

Dudley E. Thompson (April 30, 1909 – March 5, 1981) was a Democratic politician from Nebraska who served as a member of the Nebraska Legislature from the 26th district from 1943 to 1945.

== Early life ==
Thompson was born in Fullerton, Nebraska, in 1909. He attended Hastings College and graduated from the University of Nebraska with his bachelor of laws degree in 1933, and began practicing law in Genoa. Thompson ran for Nance County Attorney in 1938, seeking to succeed his brother, Carroll Thompson, who was not seeking re-election. He won the Democratic primary, but was defeated by Republican nominee G. F. Rose in the general election.

== Nebraska Legislature ==
In 1942, Thompson ran for the Nebraska Legislature from the 26th district, which consisted of Nance and Platte counties. State Senator Tom Lambert resigned from the legislature in 1941, and Governor Dwight Griswold announced that he would appoint attorney Charles Sheldon to fill the vacancy if a special session was held, but when no special session took place, Sheldon never filled the seat. He placed first in the nonpartisan primary, winning 35 percent of the vote to nursery owner George Doll's 25 percent, and they proceeded to the general election. In the general election, Thompson defeated Doll in a landslide, winning 64 percent of the vote to Doll's 36 percent.

Thompson was commissioned as a lieutenant in the Navy Reserve in 1943, and did not seek re-election in 1944 while he was serving.

== Post-legislative career ==
After Thompson returned from his service, he worked for the Veterans Administration in Lincoln, Nebraska, until 1960, when he was relocated to Washington D.C.. He retired in 1973.

== Death ==
Thompson died on March 5, 1981.
