= National Register of Historic Places listings in Colfax County, Nebraska =

Location of Colfax County in Nebraska

Colfax County, Nebraska, United States, has 13 properties and districts listed on the National Register of Historic Places, and one former listing.

The locations of National Register properties and districts for which the latitude and longitude coordinates are included below may be seen in a map.

This National Park Service list is complete through NPS recent listings posted July 4, 2026.

== Current listings ==
	Name on the Register	Image	Date listed	Location	City or town	Description
1	Baumert & Bogner	Baumert & Bogner	July 25, 2022 (#100007938)	217 Center St. 41°43′30″N 97°00′06″W	Howells	
2	Colfax County Courthouse	Colfax County Courthouse	September 3, 1981 (#81000369)	Off Nebraska Highway 15; 41°26′49″N 97°03′18″W	Schuyler	
3	John Janecek House	John Janecek House	July 15, 1982 (#82003185)	805 E. 8th St. 41°26′38″N 97°03′04″W	Schuyler	
4	Merchant Park	Merchant Park	October 27, 2022 (#100008313)	Corner of Higgins Dr. and Adams St. 41°26′17″N 97°03′41″W	Schuyler	
5	Oak Ballroom	Oak Ballroom	February 1, 1983 (#83001082)	Colfax St. 41°26′15″N 97°03′39″W	Schuyler	
6	Schuyler Carnegie Library	Schuyler Carnegie Library	November 29, 2001 (#01001275)	1003 B St. 41°26′48″N 97°03′26″W	Schuyler	
7	Schuyler City Hall	Schuyler City Hall	September 3, 1981 (#81000370)	1020 A St. 41°26′50″N 97°03′29″W	Schuyler	
8	Schuyler Downtown Historic District	Schuyler Downtown Historic District	July 22, 2016 (#16000478)	Railside Dr., Colfax, 12th, C, D & 10th Sts. 41°26′50″N 97°03′27″W	Schuyler	
9	Schuyler Site		August 14, 1973 (#73001057)	Address Restricted	Schuyler	
10	US Post Office-Schuyler	US Post Office-Schuyler	May 11, 1992 (#92000476)	119 E. 11th St. 41°26′50″N 97°03′32″W	Schuyler	One of 12 Nebraska post offices featuring a Section of Fine Arts mural, "Wild Horses by Moonlight" (1940) by Philip von Saltza.
11	Wolfe Archeological Site		July 30, 1974 (#74001105)	Address Restricted	Schuyler	
12	Z.C.B.J. Opera House	Z.C.B.J. Opera House	September 28, 1988 (#88000948)	Fourth and Pine; 41°43′26″N 97°07′21″W	Clarkson	
13	Zion Presbyterian Church	Zion Presbyterian Church	January 7, 1988 (#87002071)	5 miles southeast of Clarkson off Nebraska Highway 15; 41°41′04″N 97°03′33″W	Clarkson	

== Former listings ==
	Name on the Register	Image	Date listed	Date removed	Location	City or town	Description
1	Our Lady of Perpetual Help Catholic Church & Cemetery	Our Lady of Perpetual Help Catholic Church & Cemetery	November 12, 1982 (#82000600)	June 26, 2023	Southern side of Road N, 9 miles north and 5.5 miles west of Schuyler; 41°34′51″N 97°09′42″W	Schuyler	

== See also ==
- List of National Historic Landmarks in Nebraska
- National Register of Historic Places listings in Nebraska
