= Lenhart Shultz =

American politician (1889–1964)

Member of the Nebraska Legislature from the 16th district
- In office January 2, 1951 – January 1, 1957
- Preceded by: Norris Schroeder
- Succeeded by: Peter H. Claussen

Personal details
- Born: December 13, 1889 Rogers, Nebraska
- Died: May 8, 1964 (aged 74) Rogers, Nebraska
- Party: Republican
- Spouse: Effie Longacre (m. 1914)
- Education: Fremont Normal School
- Occupation: Businessman

Lenhart M. Shultz (December 13, 1889 – May 8, 1964) was a Republican politician from Nebraska who served as a member of the Nebraska Legislature from the 16th district from 1951 to 1957.

== Early life ==
Shultz was born in Rogers, Nebraska, in 1889, and graduated from rural school before attending the Fremont Normal School. He owned and operated a general store in Rogers from 1910 to 1921, and served as postmaster from 1920 to 1921. Shultz later owned the Shultz Oil Company and operated a Skelly Oil gas station in Schuyler. Shultz was active in the Nebraska Republican Party, and served as a delegate to the Colfax County Republican Party convention in 1934.

== Nebraska Legislature ==
In 1946, when State Senator William Crossland declined to seek re-election, Shultz ran to succeed him in the 16th district, which included Colfax, Stanton, and Wayne counties. In the nonpartisan primary, he faced Albert Fickler, a former State Representative; Norris Schroeder, a farmer; and Otto Weber, a member of the Colfax County Soil Conversation Board. Shultz placed second in the primary, winning 25 percent of the vote to Schroeder's 44 percent, and they proceeded to the general election. Shultz narrowly lost to Schroeder, losing by just 64 votes.

Shultz ran for the legislature again in 1950. Schroeder initially announced that he would not seek re-election, but filed for a third term minutes before the filing deadline. Schroeder placed first in the primary, winning 61 percent of the vote to Shultz's 39 percent, but in the general election, Shultz ultimately won, defeating Schroeder, 55-45 percent.

In 1952, Shultz was re-elected unopposed. He ran for a third term in 1954, and was challenged by Walter Fenske, a farmer and cattleman. In the primary election, Shultz placed first, winning 57 percent of the vote to Fenske's 43 percent. Shultz and Fenske advanced to the general election, and one week before the election, Ernest Strate announced that he would run as a write-in candidate. Shultz ultimately won re-election in a landslide, receiving 62 percent of the vote to Fenske's 37 percent and Strate's 1 percent.

Shultz ran for a fourth term in 1956. He was opposed by former State Representative Peter H. Claussen, and farmer Albert Watson. In the primary election, Shultz narrowly placed second, winning 34 percent of the vote to Watson's 35 percent and Claussen's 30 percent. Shultz and Watson advanced to the general election, but in September, Shultz announced that he was dropping out of the race, citing "illness and a death in the family" as reasons that his "business will require my undivided attention." He was replaced on the general election ballot by Claussen, who ultimately won.

In 1960, Claussen re-entered politics, and challenged Claussen for re-election. He faced Claussen and Clarence Schroeder in the primary, and placed third, winning 25 percent of the vote to Schroeder's 42 percent and Claussen's 35 percent.

== Death ==
Shultz died on May 8, 1964.
