= Emil Brodecky =

American politician (1885–1943)

Member of the Nebraska Legislature from the 16th district
- In office January 5, 1937 – January 7, 1941
- Preceded by: Position created
- Succeeded by: William Crossland

Member of the Nebraska State Senate from the 12th district
- In office January 3, 1933 – January 5, 1937
- Preceded by: Henry Behrens
- Succeeded by: Position abolished

Personal details
- Born: June 26, 1885 Schuyler, Nebraska
- Died: October 25, 1943 (aged 58) Omaha, Nebraska
- Party: Democratic
- Spouse: Lucy M. Novak (m. 1908)
- Children: 4
- Education: Nebraska School of Agriculture
- Occupation: Dairy farmer

Emil E. Brodecky (June 26, 1885 – October 25, 1943) was a Democratic politician from Nebraska who served in the Nebraska State Senate from 1933 to 1937 and as a member of the Nebraska Legislature from the 16th district from 1937 to 1941.

== Early life ==
Brodecky was born in Schuyler, Nebraska, in 1885, and graduated from Howells High School in 1904. He attended the Nebraska School of Agriculture, and worked as a dairy farmer. Brodecky served on the local school board, and as the secretary and treasurer of the local farmers' cooperative.

== Nebraska State Senate ==
In 1932, Brodecky ran for the Nebraska State Senate from the 12th district, which included Colfax, Cuming, and Stanton, challenging Republican State Senator Henry Behrens for re-election. He won the Democratic nomination by a wide margin, defeated Behrens by a wide margin in the general election, winning 62 percent of the vote to his 38 percent.

Brodecky ran for a second term in 1934, and defeated Republican A. R. Daniell with 60 percent of the vote.

== Nebraska Legislature ==
In 1936, the State Senate and the Nebraska House of Representatives were consolidated into the unicameral state legislature, and Brodecky ran in the newly created 16th district. In the nonpartisan primary, he faced State Representatives Peter H. Claussen and Otto Weber, former State Representative Albert Fickler, Adolph Dudek, and J. G. W. Lewis. Lewis narrowly placed first in the primary, winning 24 percent of the vote to Brodecky's 23 percent, and they proceeded to the general election. Brodecky defeated Lewis with 57 percent of the vote.

Brodecky was re-elected in 1938. He again faced a crowded primary, and placed first with 33 percent of the vote. Brodecky and the second place finisher, Iver S. Johnson, proceeded to the general election, which Brodecky won with 55 percent of the vote. He declined to seek re-election in 1940.

== Death ==
Brodecky died on October 25, 1943.
