= Peter H. Claussen =

American politician (1894–1990)

Member of the Nebraska Legislature
- In office January 1, 1957 – January 3, 1967
- Preceded by: Lenhart Shultz
- Succeeded by: William Hasebroock
- Constituency: 16th district (1957–1963); 18th district (1965–1967)

Member of the Nebraska House of Representatives from the 44th district
- In office January 1, 1935 – January 5, 1937
- Preceded by: Paul Bruveleit
- Succeeded by: Position abolished

Personal details
- Born: December 30, 1894 Leigh, Nebraska
- Died: April 15, 1990 (aged 95) Clarkson, Nebraska
- Party: Democratic
- Spouse: Elsie M. Dasenbrock (m. 1919)
- Children: 2
- Occupation: Farmer

Peter H. Claussen (December 30, 1894 – April 15, 1990) was a Democratic politician from Nebraska who served in the Nebraska Legislature, representing the 44th district in the Nebraska House of Representatives from 1935 to 1937, and representing the 16th and 18th districts in the unicameral legislature.

== Early life ==
Claussen was born in Leigh, Nebraska, in 1894. He was a farmer, and served on the Leigh School Board and on the Stanton County Soil Conservation District.

== Nebraska House of Representatives ==
In 1934, Claussen challenged incumbent State Representative Paul Bruveleit for re-election in the 44th district, which was based in Stanton County. He narrowly won the Democratic primary, receiving 32 percent of the vote to Elmer Loe's 26 percent, Bruveleit's 25 percent, and Arthur Peterson's 18 percent. In the general election, he faced Republican nominee Irvin Freiberg, and won by a wide margin, winning 60 percent of the vote to Freiberg's 40 percent.

== Nebraska Unicameral Legislature ==
Following the consolidation of the House of Representatives and Senate into the unicameral legislature, Claussen ran for the legislature from the 16th district, which included Colfax, Stanton, and Wayne counties. In the nonpartisan primary, he faced fellow state representatives Emil Brodecky and Otto Weber, former State Representative Albert Fickler, Adolph Dudek, and J. G. W. Lewis. Claussen placed a distant fifth in the primary, winning 11 percent of the vote to Lewis's 24 percent and Brodecky's 23 percent.

In 1956, Claussen ran for the legislature again, challenging incumbent State Senator Lenhart Shultz for re-election in the 16th district. In the primary election, Claussen narrowly placed third, receiving 30 percent of the vote to farmer Albert Watson's 35 percent and Shultz's 35 percent. However, two months before the general election, Shultz dropped out of the race, citing a need to attend to his business interests, and Claussen replaced him on the general election ballot. Claussen ultimately defeated Watson by a wide margin, winning 59 percent of the vote to his 41 percent.

Claussen ran for re-election in 1958. No candidates originally filed to run against him, but former State Representative Otto Weber filed to run against him as a write-in candidate. Claussen received 92 percent of the vote in the primary, while Weber received 253 votes and 8 percent of the vote. Weber did not receive enough votes to advance to the general election, and Claussen was re-elected unopposed.

In 1960, Claussen ran for a third term, and was challenged by former State Senator Lenhart Shultz and Clarence Schroeder. In the primary election, Claussen placed second, winning 33 percent of the vote to Schroeder's 42 percent and Shultz's 25 percent, and Claussen and Schroeder advanced to the general election. On election night, Claussen led Schroeder by 4 votes, and after the mail ballots were counted, his lead expanded to 22 votes. Following a canvass of the results, Claussen's victory over Schroeder narrowed further to 12 votes, and he was declared the winner.

Claussen ran for re-election to a fourth term in 1962, and was challenged by Lyle Marotz, a director of the Wayne County Public Power District, and Anton Odvarka Jr., the former editor of the Colfax County Press. Claussen placed first in the primary, receiving 51 percent of the vote to Marotz's 30 percent and Odvarka's 19 percent. Claussen and Marotz advanced to the general election, which Claussen ultimately won with 58 percent of the vote.

In 1964, following redistricting, Claussen ran for re-election in the 18th district, which swapped out Pierce County for Colfax County. He was challenged by Marotz, in a rematch of their 1962 race; Melvin Kruse, the Pierce County District Court Clerk; and nursing home operator Clifford Dahl. Claussen narrowly placed first in the primary, winning 31 percent of the vote to Marotz's 29 percent. In the general election, Claussen defeated Marotz, winning re-election, 53–47 percent.

After the state legislature was expanded to 49 members, the 18th district was redrawn to include Colfax, Cuming, and Stanton counties. Claussen was drawn into the same district as fellow State Senator William Hasebroock, and ultimately decided to seek another term. In the primary, he faced Hasebroock and farmer Frank Cada, Claussen placed third, winning 22 percent of the vote to Hasebroock's 47 percent and Cade's 31 percent, and was defeated.

== Death ==
Claussen died on April 15, 1990.
