= Senator Schulz =

Senator Schulz may refer to:

- George M. S. Schulz (1871–1930), New York State Senate
- Mike Schulz (born 1964), Oklahoma State Senate

== See also ==
- Senator Schultz (disambiguation)
- Senator Shultz (disambiguation)
