= Columbus Izaak Walton League Lodge =

- U.S. National Register of Historic Places
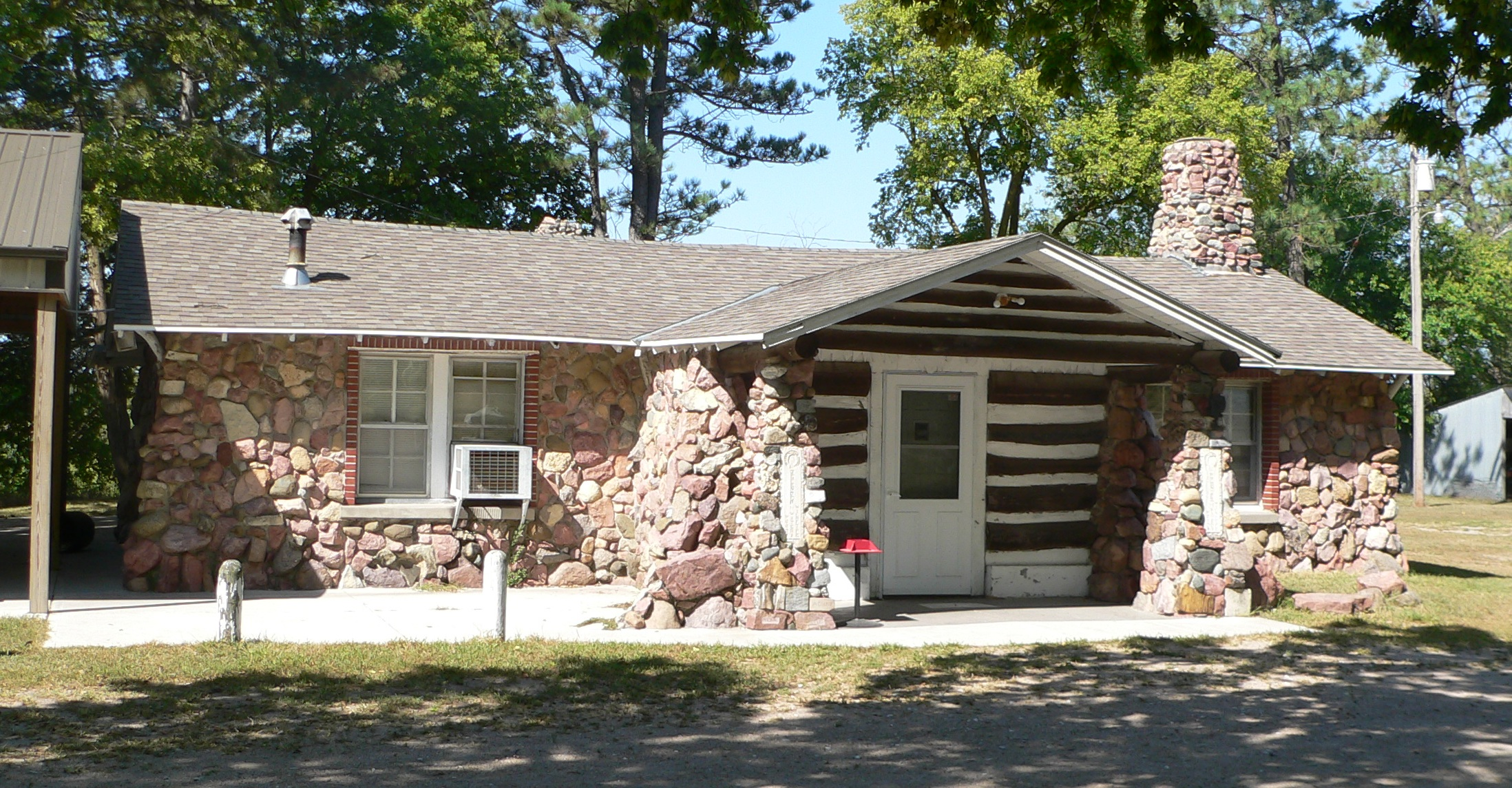

- Location within Nebraska Location within the United States
- Location: NE 81, Columbus, Nebraska
- Coordinates: 41°24′27″N 97°22′09″W
- Area: 9 acres (3.6 ha)
- Built: 1938
- Architect: Emiel Christensen
- Architectural style: Bungalow/craftsman, Rustic
- NRHP reference No.: 01001277
- Added to NRHP: November 29, 2001

The Columbus Izaak Walton League Lodge, on U.S. Route 81 just south of Columbus, Nebraska, was built in 1938. It was designed by local architect Emiel Christensen, whose Oak Ballroom in nearby Schuyler, Nebraska, shares a similar rustic style.

The lodge sits on the north bank of Barnum Creek and is mainly constructed of cottonwood logs donated by a local landowner. Volunteer labor was used to construct it.

The lodge was listed on the National Register of Historic Places in 2001. The listing included two contributing buildings and five contributing structures.

It serves as the lodge of the Columbus chapter of the Izaak Walton League, one of the oldest conservation organizations in the United States. The lodge building is available for rent, for weddings or other usages, in 2018.

Other names: NeHBS No. PT00-262
