= Wigington =

Wigington is a surname. Notable people with the surname include:

- Clarence W. Wigington (1883–1967), African-American architect
- Fred Wigington (1897–1980), American baseball player
- Geoff Wigington (born 1989), American musician and singer
