= Schuyler Carnegie Library =

- U.S. National Register of Historic Places
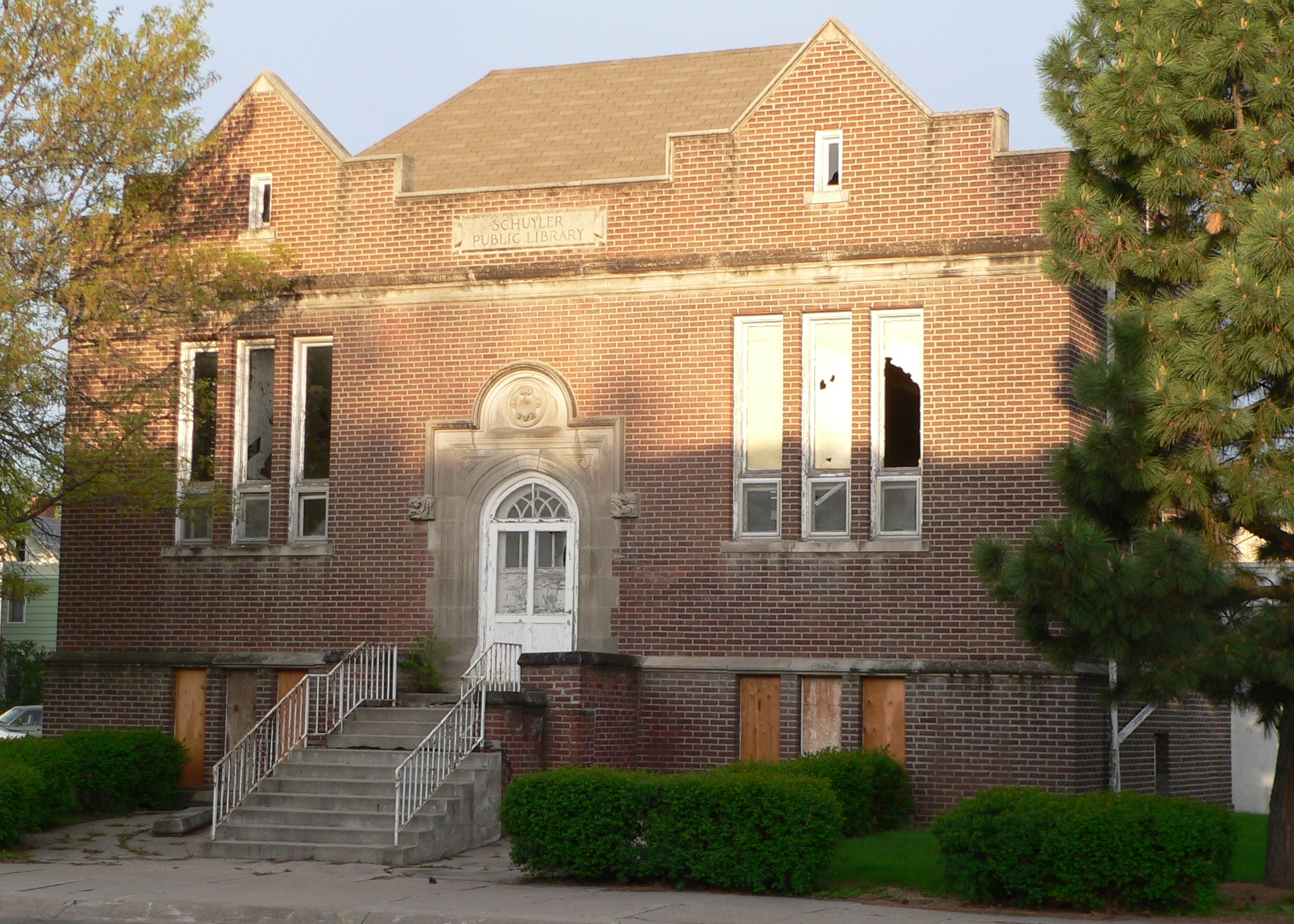
- The library in 2010

- Location within Nebraska Location within the United States
- Location: 1003 B Street, Schuyler, Nebraska
- Coordinates: 41°26′48″N 97°03′26″W
- Area: less than one acre
- Built: 1911
- Built by: P.H. Wind & Sons
- Architect: Fisher & Lawrie
- Architectural style: Tudor Revival
- MPS: Carnegie Libraries in Nebraska MPS
- NRHP reference No.: 01001275
- Added to NRHP: November 29, 2001

The Schuyler Carnegie Library was a historic building in Schuyler, Nebraska. It was built as a Carnegie library by P.H. Wind & Sons in 1911, and designed in the Tudor Revival style by the architectural firm Fisher & Lawrie. It was a library until 1975, and it housed the Schuyler / Colfax County Historical Society Museum from 1977 to 1998. It was listed on the National Register of Historic Places on November 29, 2001. The building was demolished in 2022.
