= Colfax County Courthouse (Nebraska) =

- U.S. National Register of Historic Places
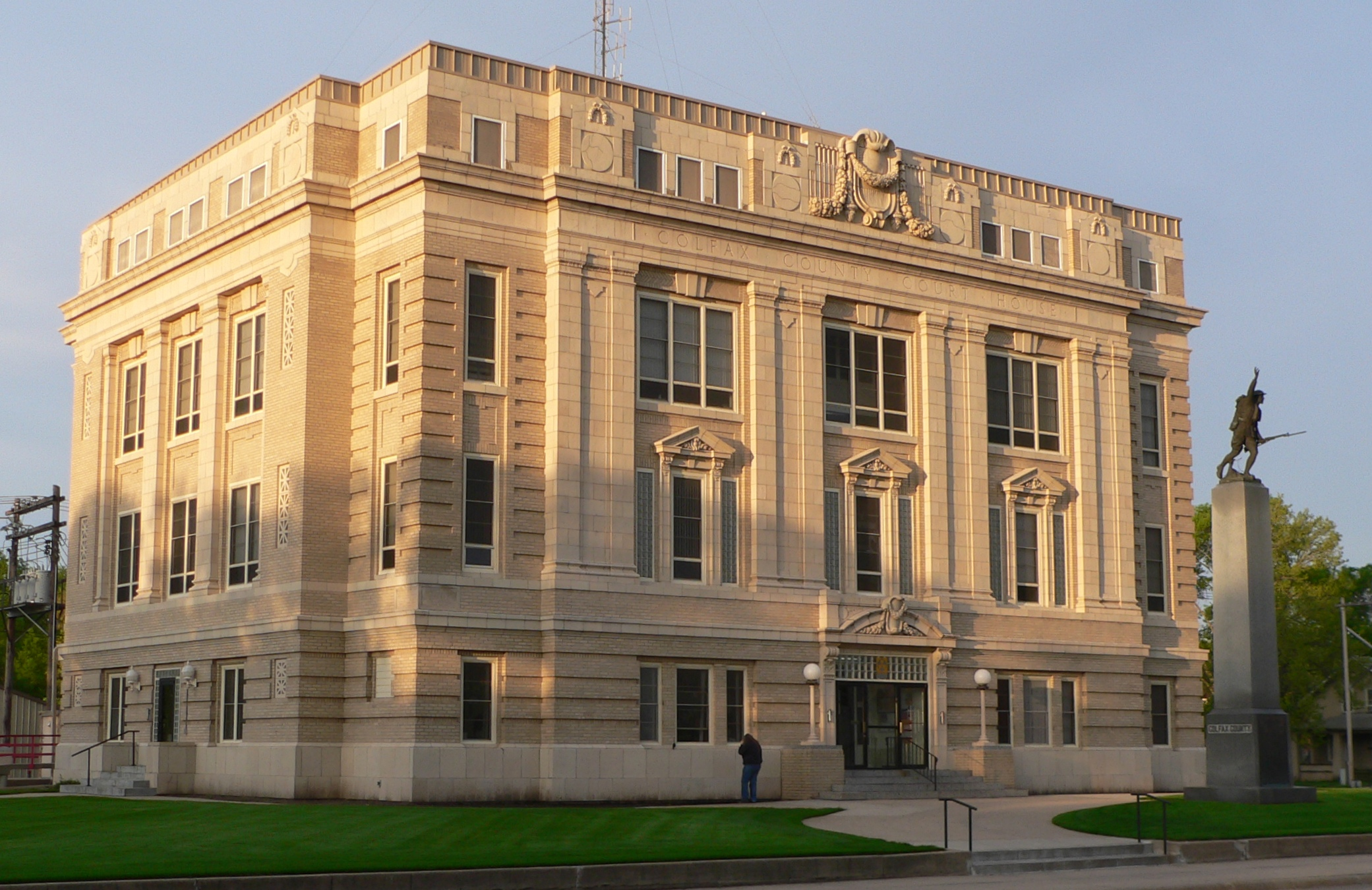
- The courthouse in 2010

- Location within Nebraska Location within the United States
- Location: Off NE 15, Schuyler, Nebraska
- Coordinates: 41°26′49″N 97°03′18″W
- Area: less than one acre
- Built: 1921
- Built by: R. 0. Stake
- Architect: George A. Berlinghof
- Architectural style: Renaissance Revival
- NRHP reference No.: 81000369
- Added to NRHP: September 3, 1981

The Colfax County Courthouse is a historic four-story building in Schuyler, Nebraska, and the courthouse for Colfax County, Nebraska. When it was built by R. O. Stake in 1921–1922, it replaced the 1871-72 courthouse. The new courthouse designed in the Renaissance Revival style by German-born architect George A. Berlinghof. The cornerstone was laid in a Masonic ritual. The building has been listed on the National Register of Historic Places since September 3, 1981.
