= Z.C.B.J. Opera House (Clarkson, Nebraska) =

- U.S. National Register of Historic Places
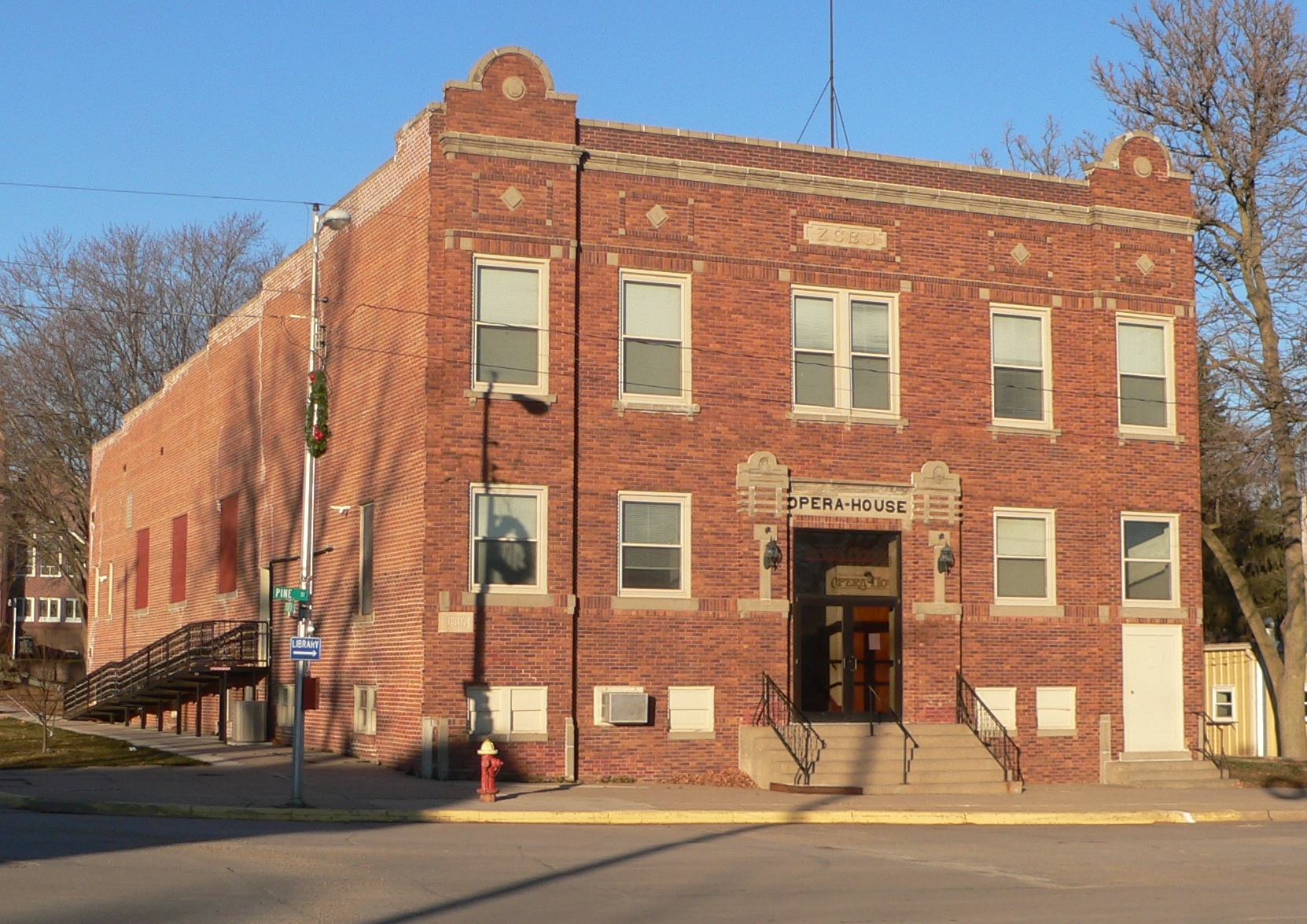

- Location within Nebraska Location within the United States
- Location: Fourth and Pine, Clarkson, Nebraska
- Coordinates: 41°43′26″N 97°7′21″W
- Built: 1913
- NRHP reference No.: 88000948
- Added to NRHP: September 28, 1988

Z.C.B.J. Opera House is an historic building located in Clarkson, Nebraska, United States, that was built in 1913 by the Zapadni Ceska Bratrska Jednota, or Western Bohemian Fraternal Association. It was listed on the National Register of Historic Places on September 28, 1988. The building serves as a meeting hall for the Czech community. It has hosted operas, dances, lectures, films and Czech heritage events.

Sound films were shown in the opera house beginning in the 1930s.

== See also ==
- Czech-Slovak Protective Society
