= Senator Schroeder =

Senator Schroeder may refer to:

- Frederick A. Schroeder (1833–1899), New York State Senate
- Jack Schroeder (1925–2017), Iowa State Senate
- Norris Schroeder (1907–1989), Nebraska State Senate
- Ted F. Schroeder (1902–1979), Washington State Senate
- Wil Schroder (born 1982), Kentucky State Senate
