= Emiel Christensen =

American architect (1895–1988)

Emiel J. Christensen (April 23, 1895 – May 1988) was an American architect, community planner, and professor at the University of Nebraska whose work includes the Oak Ballroom in Schuyler, Nebraska, Eagle Creek Lodge in Atkinson, Nebraska, Izaak Walton League Lodge in Columbus, Nebraska. He also designed several homes in Columbus, the area where he lived.

Christensen wrote "emphatically" on enviroethics. His son has spoken on his work since his death.

== Background ==
Christensen was born in Washington County, Nebraska on April 23, 1895 and received his architectural training from the School of Architecture at Washington University in St. Louis. After World War I, he worked at architectural firms in Omaha, Nebraska and Jacksonville, Florida.

Christensen came to Columbus from Lyons, Nebraska with his wife Clara in the summer of 1927 and worked for a local architectural company until "after a short time he purchased the business". The Oak Ballroom was one of his earliest works and remains one of his best known projects. He "also worked as the building foreman on the ballroom". His other work includes many family residences in Columbus that include a "distinctive use of red brick and stone exteriors".

Christensen also designed the "old" city hall built in the 1930s, and he served as a technical adviser to the Columbus City Council where he "designed additions to the city's water and sewer systems". He served as the Columbus Red Cross disaster chairman "for many years" and "after World War II Emiel developed a reputation in community planning, and was invited to join the faculty of the University of Nebraska" where he taught classes in community planning and "became a leader in Nebraska's Community Improvement Program".

In 1954 Christensen partnered with Elmer Bradley to develop PaWiTo, "a private venture in creative recreation" and a "nature-lover's paradise" consisting of 30 acres (120,000 m^{2}) of land "nestled in the bluffs south of Columbus... rich with wild fruits, creatures, 60 species of trees and over 100 kinds of birds.

Christensen was Coordinator of Community Services at the University of Nebraska, a member of groups including the American Society of Planning Officials, a member of the American Institute of Architects, and a Rotarian. He died of pulmonary failure at 93.

== Projects ==
Christensen's Oak Ballroom and Columbus Izaak Walton League Lodge are listed on the National Register of Historic Places. The designs are similar and the Oak Ballroom has striking exposed wood beams in its construction while the Columbus Izaak Walton League Lodge also uses wood and stone for a rustic look.

=== Eagle Creek Lodge ===
Eagle Creek Lodge is 4,060 square feet (377 m^{2}) and features custom cedar logs cut from native Nebraska timbers. It includes four bedrooms, two and a half baths, a wet bar, billiard room, and was built in 1971. A 20-foot-tall (6.1 m) fireplace made with petrified cottonwood from the banks of the nearby Niobrara River is located in its "great room", which also offers panoramic views of a nearby lake and prairie. A real estate listing noted the building is on 160 acres (65 ha) "with a 35 acre spring fed bass stocked lake" and that "upland waterfowl hunting is available on site with turkey and deer hunting nearby."
