= United States Post Office (Schuyler, Nebraska) =

- US Post Office--Schuyler
- U.S. National Register of Historic Places
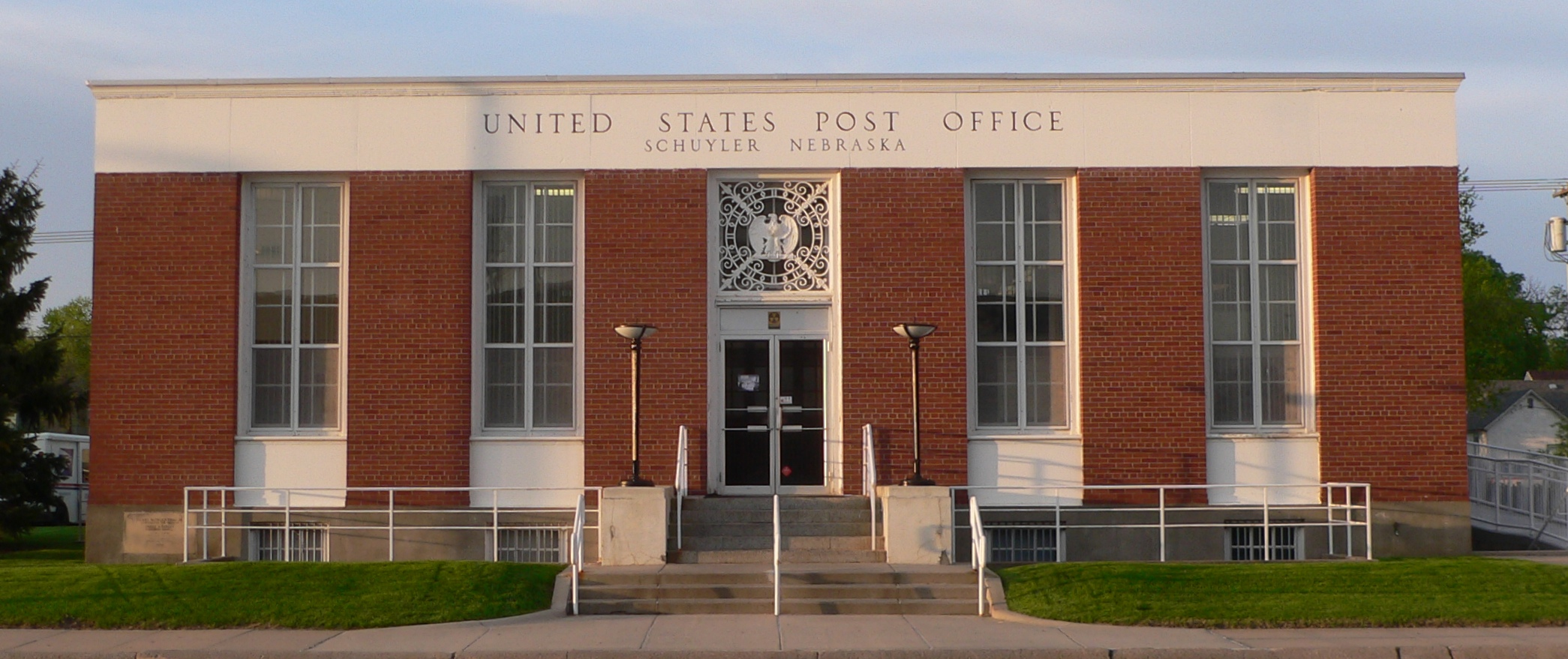
- The building in 2010

- Location within Nebraska Location within the United States
- Location: 119 East 11th Street, Schuyler, Nebraska
- Coordinates: 41°26′50″N 97°03′31″W
- Area: less than one acre
- Built: 1940
- Built by: Busboom & Rauh
- Architect: Louis Simon
- Architectural style: Moderne
- MPS: Nebraska Post Offices Which Contain Section Artwork MPS
- NRHP reference No.: 92000476
- Added to NRHP: May 11, 1992

The United States Post Office is a historic building in Schuyler, Nebraska. It was built by Busboom & Rauh in 1940, and designed in the Moderne style by Louis Simon. Inside, there is a mural by Philip von Saltza. The building has been listed on the National Register of Historic Places since May 11, 1992.
