= Norris Schroeder =

American politician (1907–1989)

Member of the Nebraska Legislature from the 16th district
- In office January 7, 1947 – January 2, 1951
- Preceded by: William Crossland
- Succeeded by: Lenhart Shultz

Personal details
- Born: June 20, 1907 Hoskins, Nebraska
- Died: December 25, 1989 (aged 82) Fort Morgan, Colorado
- Party: Republican
- Spouse: Zelda Anderson (m. 1940)
- Children: 4
- Education: Nebraska Wesleyan University; Lamont School of Music
- Occupation: Farmer

Norris Franklin Schroeder (June 20, 1907 – December 25, 1989) was a Republican politician from Nebraska who served as a member of the Nebraska Legislature from the 16th district from 1947 to 1951.

== Early life ==
Schroeder was born in Hoskins, Nebraska, in 1907. He attended Nebraska Wesleyan University and maintained a farm in Hoskins, where he served on the school board.

== Nebraska Legislature ==
In 1946, State Senator William Crossland declined to seek re-election, and instead ran for Wayne County Attorney. Schroeder ran to succeed him in the 16th district, which included Colfax, Stanton, and Wayne counties. In the nonpartisan primary, he faced former State Representative Albert Fickler; businessman Lenhart Shultz; and Otto Weber, a member of the Colfax County Soil Conversation Board. Schroeder placed first in the primary, winning 44 percent of the vote, and advanced to the general election with Shultz, who placed second with 25 percent of the vote. Schroeder narrowly defeated Shultz, winning by 64 votes.

Schroeder ran for re-election in 1948, and was re-elected unopposed. In 1950, Schroeder initially announced that he would not seek re-election, but decided to run for a third term at the last minute. He faced Shultz, in a rematch of their 1946 race, and placed first in the primary by a wide margin, receiving 61 percent of the vote to Shultz's 39 percent. Shultz ultimately defeated Schroeder in the general election, winning 55 percent of the vote.

== Post-legislative career ==
In 1951, following the death of Republican Congressman Karl Stefan, Schroeder attended the Republican Party's 3rd district committee meeting, where he nominated Bob Harrison to run as the Republican nominee in the ensuing special election.

Schroeder sold the land that he owned in Stanton and Wayne counties and moved with his wife to a ranch in Fort Morgan, Colorado.

== Death ==
Schroeder died on December 25, 1989.
