= Christ the King Priory =

Benedictine monastery in Nebraska, US

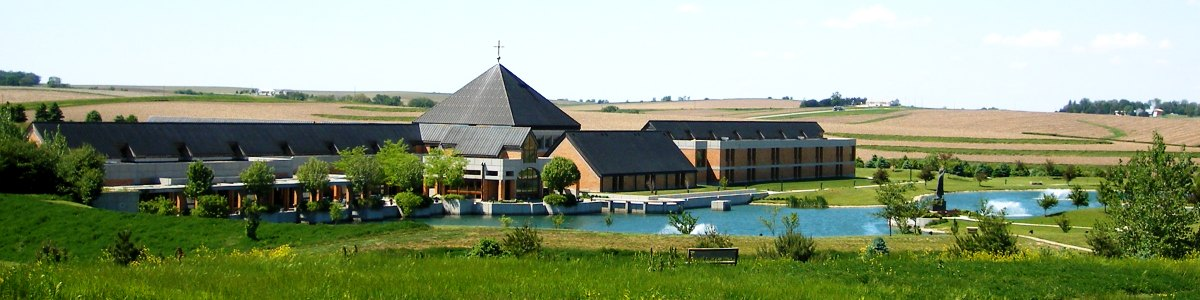

- Location within Nebraska Location within the United States
- Interactive map of Christ the King Priory

Monastery information
- Other name: Schuyler Priory
- Order: Order of Saint Benedict
- Established: 1935
- Mother house: Münsterschwarzach Abbey
- Dedication: Christ the King
- Diocese: Roman Catholic Archdiocese of Omaha

People
- Prior: Rev. Joel Macul, O.S.B.
- Archbishop: Archbishop George Joseph Lucas

Architecture
- Functional status: Monastery
- Architect: Neil Lamonte Astle

Site
- Location: 1123 Road I, Schuyler, NE 68661 United States
- Coordinates: 41°30′32″N 97°3′16″W
- Website: www.missionmonks.org

Christ the King Priory is a monastery of Benedictine monks located north of Schuyler, Nebraska, United States. It is designated as a "Priory" by the Congregation of Missionary Benedictines of Saint Ottilien under whose oversight the monastery operates.

== History ==
In 1935, Münsterschwarzach Abbey, Germany, sent two monks to the US in order to secure the survival of the congregation's missionary work during the Nazi regime. The "Benedictine Mission House" was founded that year in Schuyler, Nebraska in a house purchased from a religious community of sisters. In 1979, a new monastery building was constructed north of Schuyler with a distinctive style built into the rolling hills. In 1985, the monastery was raised to the status of a simple priory with expanded ministries. In 1997, "Christ the King Priory" expanded its ministries and opened a 100-bed "St. Benedict Center" as a non-profit, ecumenical retreat, and conference center.

== Architecture ==
The monastery, mission house, guest center, and small man-made lake for fire protection water, were designed by a nationally known Nebraskan architect, Neil Lamonte Astle (1933-2000). He was the recipient of the "Harry F. Cunningham Gold Medal for Architectural Excellence in the State of Nebraska" and won numerous awards for his design of the Priory complex. He was featured in various architectural magazines for his Priory design and the "seamless form' of his work. The Priory design was especially noted for its integrational features that blended the work naturally into the surrounding landscape, its blending of wood and concrete in the design and construction, and its minimal spaces that still convey warmth.

== Present ==
Today the priory welcomes around 13,000 people annually. The community's ministries are threefold: to raise funds for the many international foundations operated by the Missionary Benedictines; to serve as a retreat center to the local and national community; and to foster the work of "El Puente Immigration Legal Services."

== Gallery ==
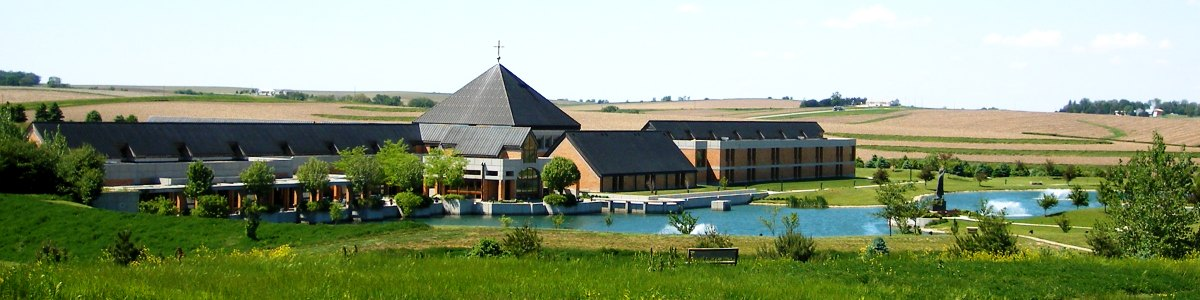

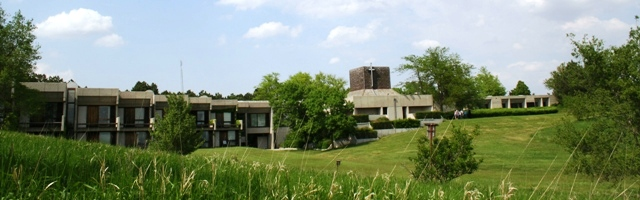
