= Richland, Nebraska =

- Village
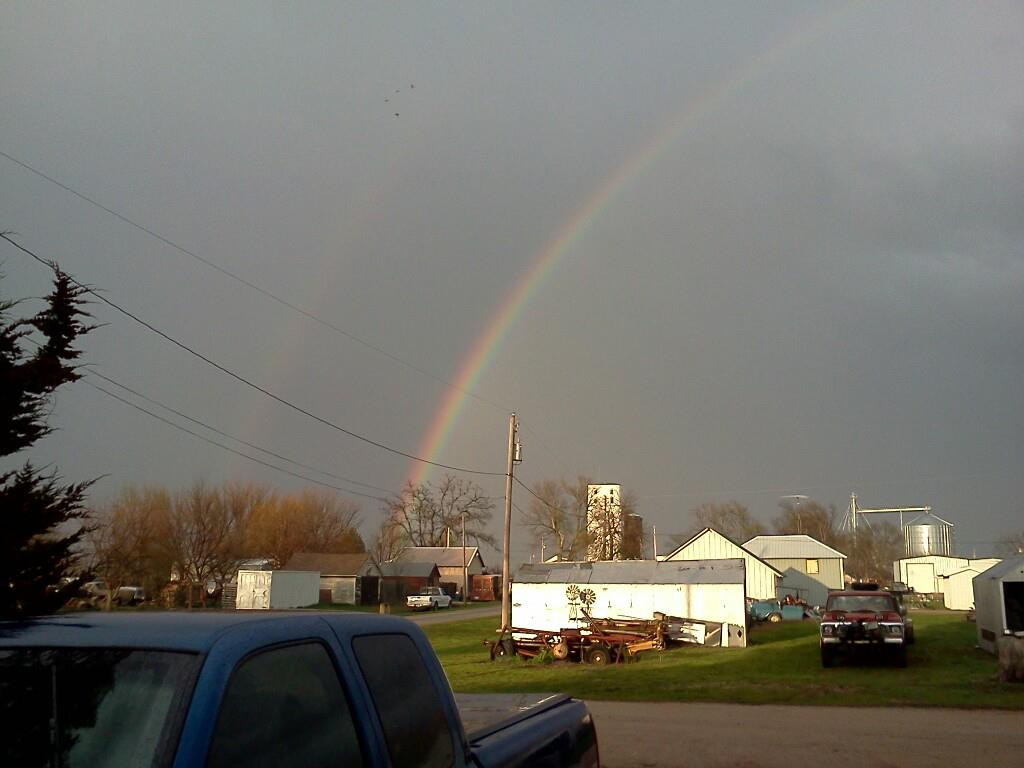
- Richland with the elevators in the distance

- Location of Richland, Nebraska
- Coordinates: 41°26′13″N 97°12′54″W
- Country: United States
- State: Nebraska
- County: Colfax

Area
  - Total: 0.21 sq mi (0.55 km^{2})
  - Land: 0.21 sq mi (0.55 km^{2})
  - Water: 0 sq mi (0.00 km^{2})
- Elevation: 1,398 ft (426 m)

Population (2020)
  - Total: 70
  - Density: 327.1/sq mi (126.31/km^{2})
- Time zone: UTC-6 (Central (CST))
  - Summer (DST): UTC-5 (CDT)
- ZIP code: 68601
- Area codes: 402 and 531
- FIPS code: 31-41375
- GNIS feature ID: 2399065

Richland is a village in Colfax County, Nebraska, United States. As of the 2020 census, Richland had a population of 70.

== History ==
Richland was once known as Benton. It was a shipping point on the Union Pacific Railroad. A post office was established at Richland in 1870.

== Geography ==
According to the United States Census Bureau, the village has a total area of 0.21 square miles (0.54 km^{2}), all land.

== Demographics ==
Historical population
Census	Pop.	Note	%±
1910	156		—
1920	133		−14.7%
1930	174		30.8%
1940	160		−8.0%
1950	141		−11.9%
1960	139		−1.4%
1970	123		−11.5%
1980	114		−7.3%
1990	96		−15.8%
2000	89		−7.3%
2010	73		−18.0%
2020	70		−4.1%
U.S. Decennial Census

=== 2010 census ===
As of the census of 2010, there were 73 people, 36 households, and 22 families residing in the village. The population density was 347.6 inhabitants per square mile (134.2/km^{2}). There were 43 housing units at an average density of 204.8 per square mile (79.1/km^{2}). The racial makeup of the village was 94.5% White, 1.4% African American, 2.7% from other races, and 1.4% from two or more races. Hispanic or Latino of any race were 5.5% of the population.

There were 36 households, of which 16.7% had children under the age of 18 living with them, 52.8% were married couples living together, 5.6% had a female householder with no husband present, 2.8% had a male householder with no wife present, and 38.9% were non-families. 33.3% of all households were made up of individuals, and 13.9% had someone living alone who was 65 years of age or older. The average household size was 2.03 and the average family size was 2.55.

The median age in the village was 51.8 years. 13.7% of residents were under the age of 18; 5.4% were between the ages of 18 and 24; 11% were from 25 to 44; 46.5% were from 45 to 64; and 23.3% were 65 years of age or older. The gender makeup of the village was 57.5% male and 42.5% female.

=== 2000 census ===
As of the census of 2000, there were 89 people, 45 households, and 27 families residing in the village. The population density was 407.2 inhabitants per square mile (157.2/km^{2}). There were 50 housing units at an average density of 228.8 per square mile (88.3/km^{2}). The racial makeup of the village was 97.75% White, 1.12% African American and 1.12% Native American. Hispanic or Latino of any race were 1.12% of the population.

There were 45 households, out of which 17.8% had children under the age of 18 living with them, 55.6% were married couples living together, 2.2% had a female householder with no husband present, and 40.0% were non-families. 31.1% of all households were made up of individuals, and 11.1% had someone living alone who was 65 years of age or older. The average household size was 1.98 and the average family size was 2.48.

In the village, the population was spread out, with 12.4% under the age of 18, 7.9% from 18 to 24, 28.1% from 25 to 44, 33.7% from 45 to 64, and 18.0% who were 65 years of age or older. The median age was 46 years. For every 100 females, there were 128.2 males. For every 100 females age 18 and over, there were 122.9 males.

As of 2000 the median income for a household in the village was $26,042, and the median income for a family was $33,125. Males had a median income of $23,750 versus $25,625 for females. The per capita income for the village was $15,822. There were no families and 5.9% of the population living below the poverty line, including no under eighteens and 10.0% of those over 64.
