= Senator Shultz =

Senator Shultz may refer to:

- Clark Shultz (born 1957), Kansas State Senate
- John Andrew Shulze (1775–1852), Pennsylvania State Senate
- Lenhart Shultz (1889–1964), Nebraska State Senate
- Reynolds Shultz (1921–2000), Kansas State Senate
- Searles G. Shultz (1897–1975), New York State Senate

== See also ==
- Senator Schultz (disambiguation)
