= Zion Presbyterian Church (Clarkson, Nebraska) =

Historic church in Nebraska, United States

- U.S. National Register of Historic Places
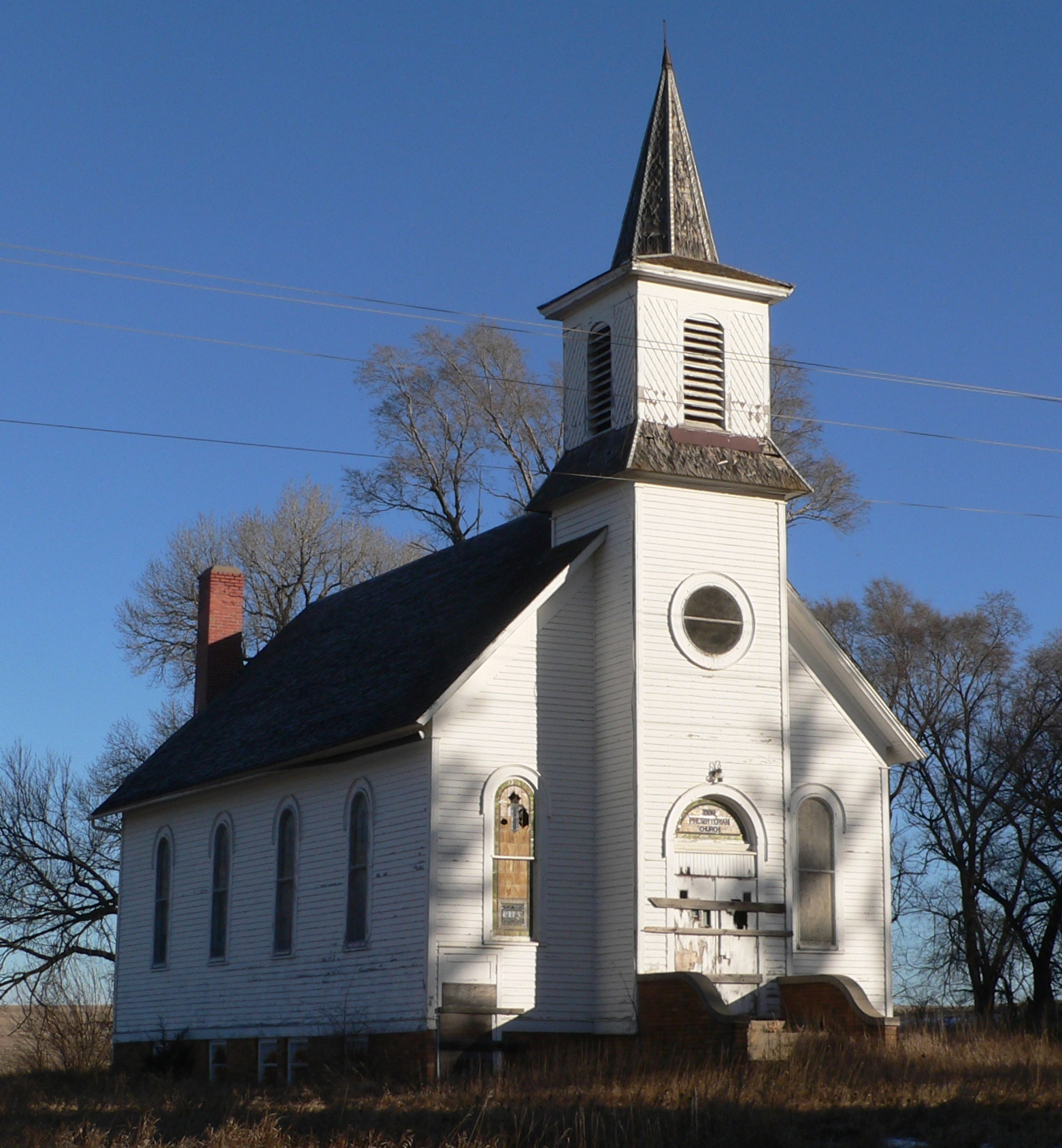

- Location within Nebraska Location within the United States
- Nearest city: Clarkson, Nebraska
- Coordinates: 41°41′4″N 97°3′33″W
- Area: 4 acres (1.6 ha)
- Built: 1887-88
- Architect: Flechor, M.D.
- NRHP reference No.: 87002071
- Added to NRHP: January 7, 1988

Zion Presbyterian Church is a historic church in Clarkson, Nebraska that is significant "as the first Czech Presbyterian Church in Nebraska and one of a very few in this section of the country". It was designed by a Czech architect named M.D. Flechor and was built during 1887–88.

It was added to the National Register of Historic Places in 1988. Its NRHP nomination asserts that its architecture expresses the Czech national spirit.
