= William Crossland (Nebraska politician) =

American politician (1888–1958)

Member of the Nebraska Legislature from the 16th district
- In office January 7, 1941 – January 7, 1947
- Preceded by: Emil Brodecky
- Succeeded by: Norris Schroeder

Personal details
- Born: February 11, 1888 Wayne, Nebraska
- Died: May 18, 1958 (aged 70) Wayne, Nebraska
- Party: Republican
- Education: Nebraska Wesleyan University (A.B.); Washington University in St. Louis (A.M.); University of Nebraska College of Law (LL.B.)
- Occupation: Attorney

Military service
- Allegiance: United States
- Branch/service: United States Army

William August Crossland (February 11, 1888 – May 18, 1958) was a Republican politician from Nebraska who served as a member of the Nebraska Legislature from the 16th district from 1941 to 1947.

== Early life ==
Crossland was born in Wayne, Nebraska, in 1888, and graduated from Wayne High School. He graduated from Nebraska Wesleyan University with his bachelor's degree and from Washington University in St. Louis with his master's degree. Crossland worked for social welfare departments in St. Joseph, Missouri, and Erie, Pennsylvania, and served in the U.S. Army in World War I. After returning to Nebraska, he was the cashier to the State Bank of Laurel. He stepped down in 1927 and began working for the state banking department, and attended the University of Nebraska College of Law graduating with his bachelor of laws in 1930.

== Nebraska Legislature ==
In 1940, State Senator Emil Brodecky declined to seek re-election, instead running for Colfax County Judge. Crossland ran to succeed him in the 16th district, which included Colfax, Stanton, and Wayne counties. In the nonpartisan primary, he faced Ervine Post, the publisher of the Stanton Register, and former State Representative Otto Weber. Crossland narrowly placed second, winning 33 percent of the vote to Pont's 35 percent and Weber's 32 percent. He and Pont advanced to the general election, which he ultimately won, defeating Crossland, 54–46 percent.

Crossland ran for re-election in 1942. He was challenged by former State Representative W. A. Brown, farmer Henry Hoppe, and Weber. Crossland placed first in the primary by a wide margin, winning 51 percent of the vote to Weber's 21 percent, Hoppe's 17 percent, and Brown's 10 percent. He defeated Weber in a landslide in the general election, receiving 66 percent of the vote to his 34 percent.

In 1944, Crossland ran for re-election to a third term, and was challenged by farmer Calvin Gertsch. In the primary, Crossland received 80 percent of the vote to Gertsch's 20 percent. They proceeded to the general election, which Crossland won in a landslide, defeating Gertsch, 75–25 percent.

== Post-legislative career ==
Crossland declined to run for a fourth term in the legislature in 1946, and instead ran for Wayne County Attorney, challenging incumbent Burr Davis in the Republican primary. Burr ultimately defeated Crossland.

In 1948, Crossland ran for Wayne County Judge, challenging incumbent Judge J. M. Cherry. In the primary election, he placed first over Cherry by a wide margin, and defeated Cherry by a landslide in the general election. Crossland ran for re-election in 1952, and was re-elected unopposed. In 1955, he resigned from the bench, citing ill health.

== Death ==
Crossland died on May 18, 1958.
