= Oak Ballroom =

- U.S. National Register of Historic Places
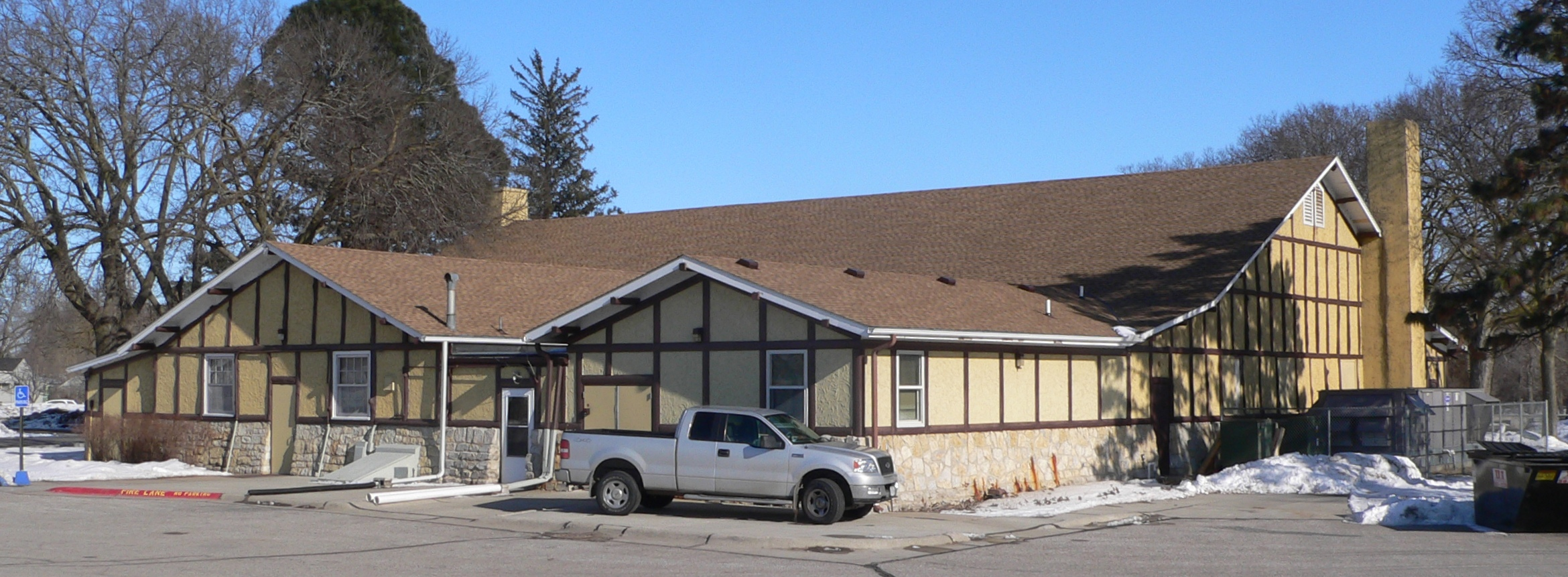
- Oak Ballroom

- Location within Nebraska Location within the United States
- Location: Colfax St., Schuyler, Nebraska
- Coordinates: 41°26′15″N 97°3′39″W
- Area: less than one acre
- Built: 1935
- Architect: Emiel J. Christensen
- Architectural style: Tudor Revival
- NRHP reference No.: 83001082
- Added to NRHP: February 1, 1983

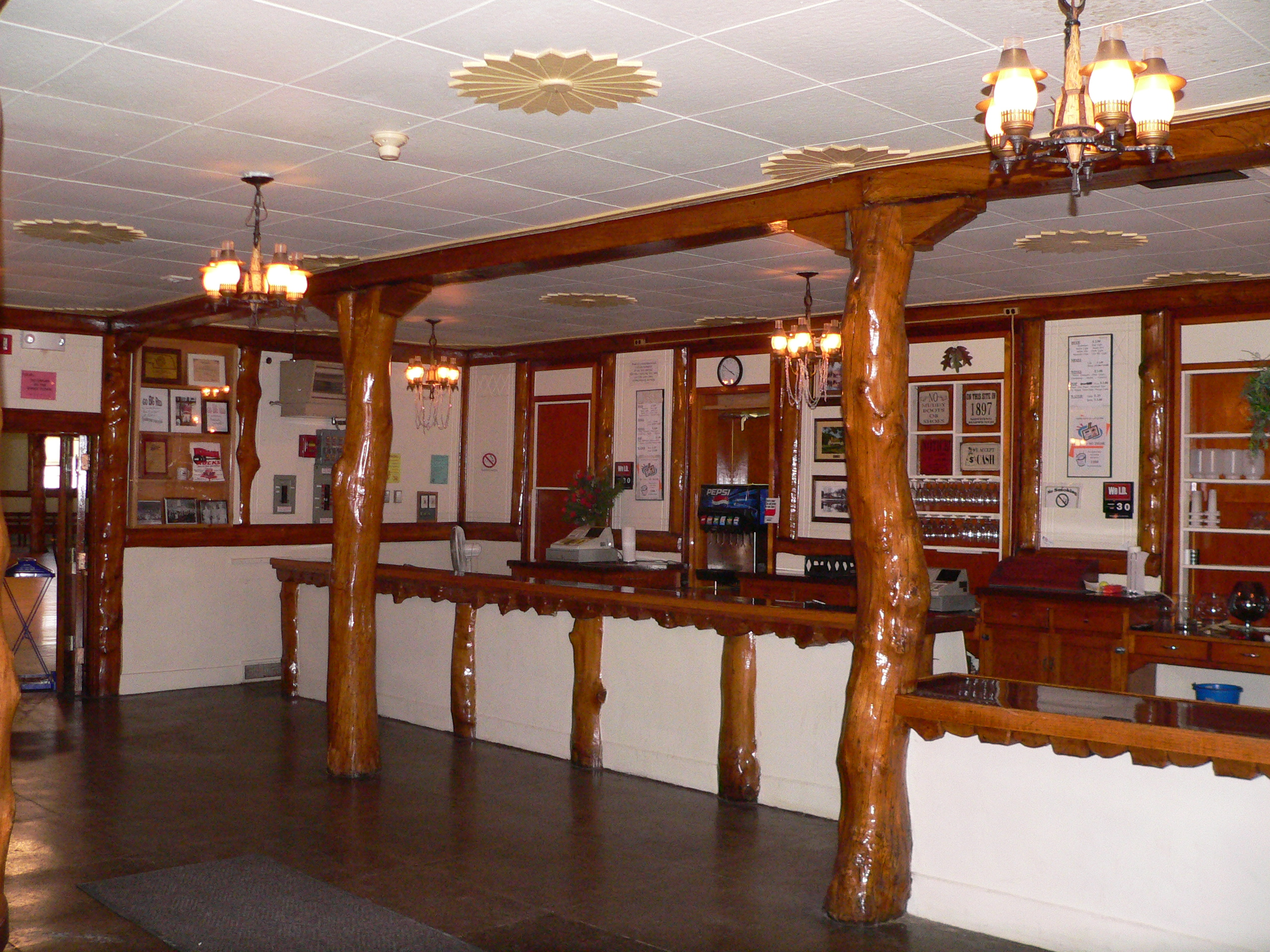
The Oak Ballroom's bar area

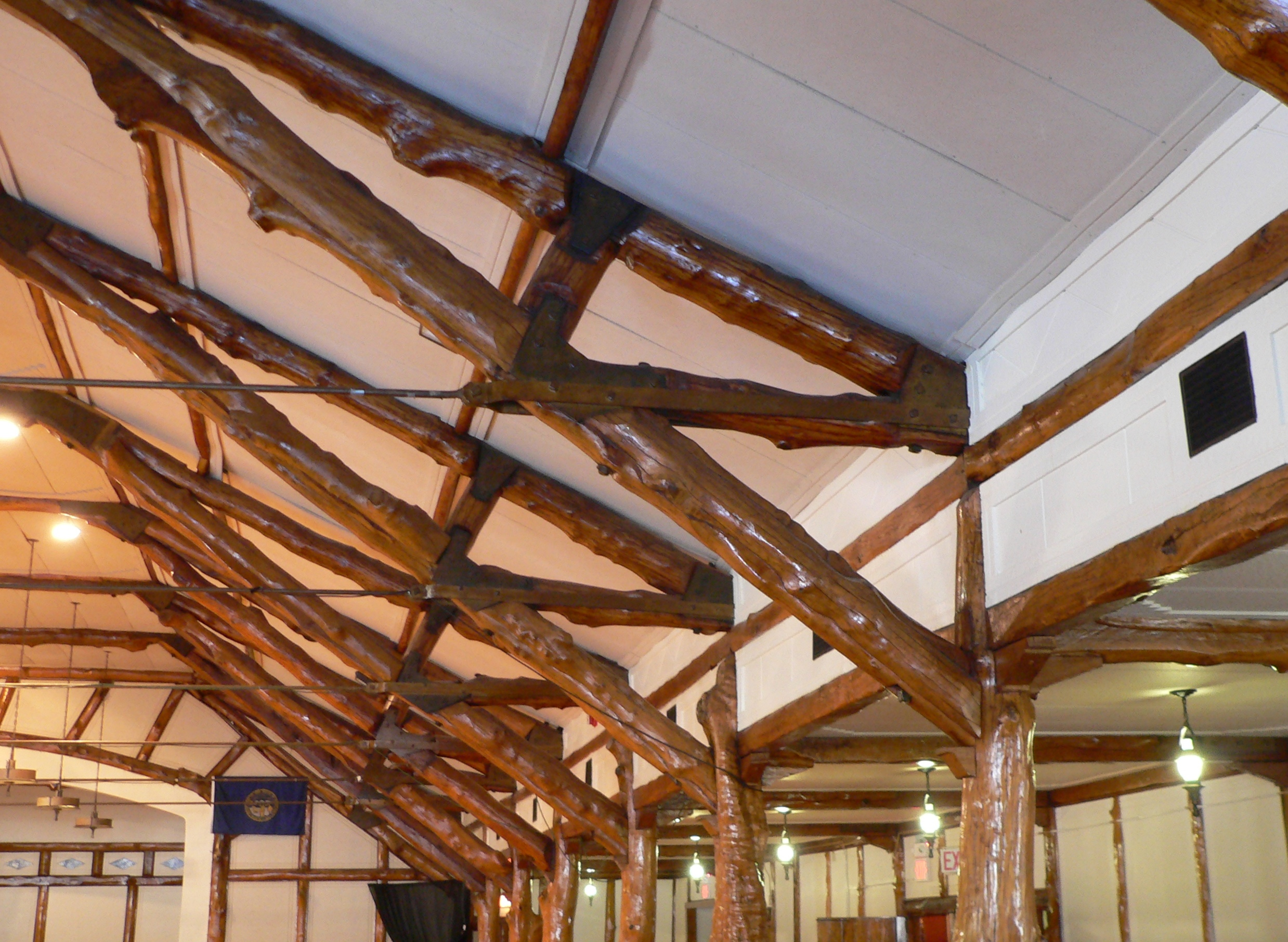
The Oak Ballroom's ceiling beams

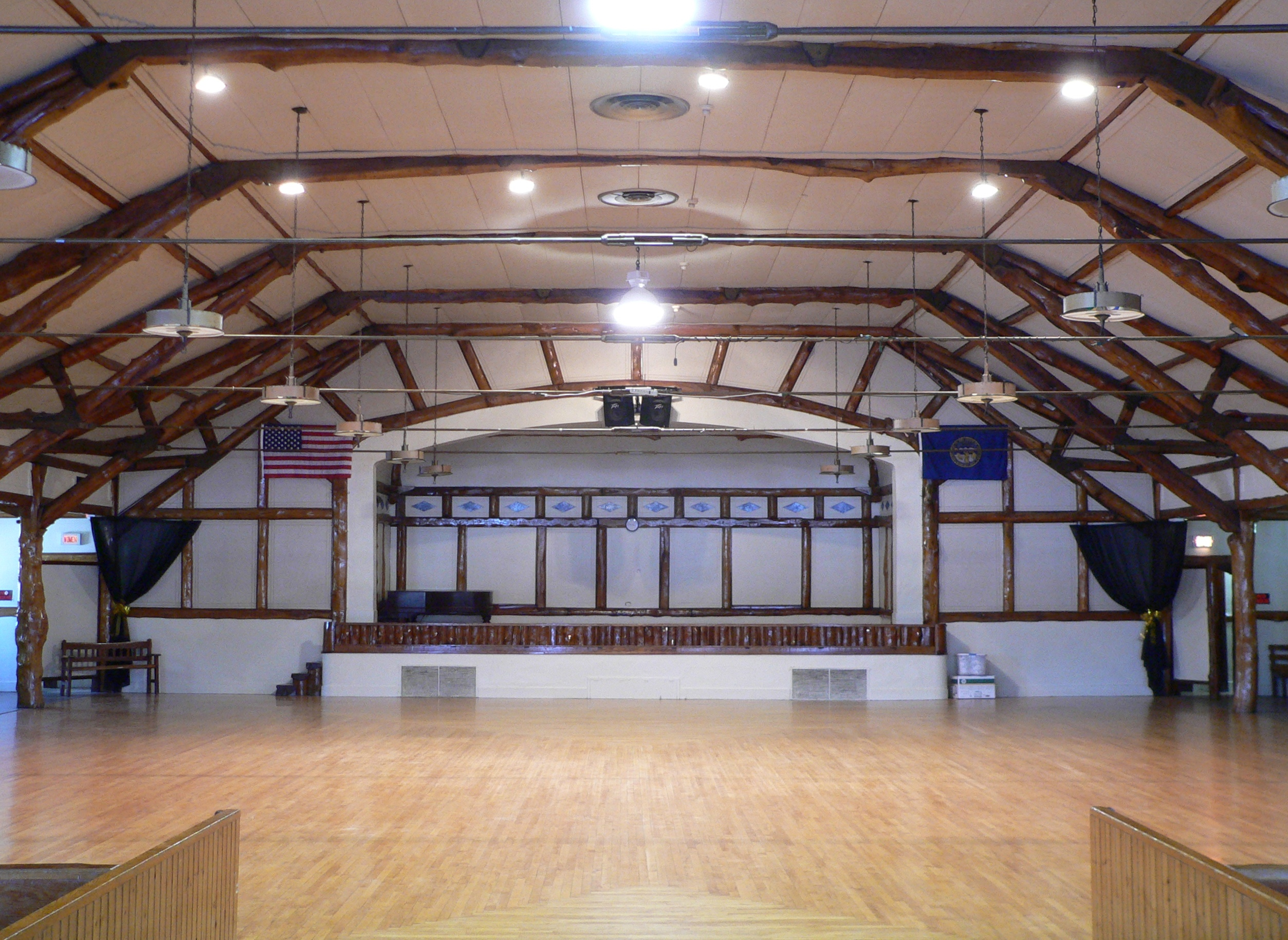
The Oak Ballroom's interior

The Oak Ballroom is a historic building in Schuyler, Nebraska constructed with dozens of native oak trees hauled to the building site from the nearby Platte River using horse and buggies. It was completed in 1937 as a Works Progress Administration project. The building, designed by Nebraska architect Emiel J. Christensen, was listed on the National Register of Historic Places in 1983.

The ballroom is at the entrance to Community Park on the Mormon Trail. Native rock is used for the walls. Chuck Hagel recalled attending dances at the ballroom and a fight at the locale.

== See also ==
- National Register of Historic Places listings in Colfax County, Nebraska
- National Register of Historic Places listings in Nebraska
