= Senator Schultz =

Senator Schultz may refer to:

- Dale Schultz (born 1953), Wisconsin State Senate
- Debbie Wasserman Schultz (born 1966), Florida State Senate
- Edwin Schultz (politician) (1898–1969), Nebraska State Senate
- Herman C. Schultz (1860–1935), Wisconsin State Senate, who in 1920 legally changed his name to Senator Schultz
- Jason Schultz (born 1972), Iowa State Senate

== See also ==
- Senator Schulz (disambiguation)
- Senator Shultz (disambiguation)
