= Fred Wigington =

American baseball player (1897–1980)

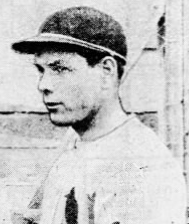
- Wigington with the St. Louis Cardinals
- Pitcher
- Born: December 16, 1897; Rogers, Nebraska, U.S.
- Died: May 8, 1980 (aged 82); Mesa, Arizona, U.S.
- Batted: Right Threw: Right

MLB debut
- April 20, 1923, for the St. Louis Cardinals

Last MLB appearance
- September 24, 1923, for the St. Louis Cardinals

MLB statistics
- Win–loss record: 0–0
- Earned run average: 3.24
- Strikeouts: 2
- Stats at Baseball Reference

Teams
- St. Louis Cardinals (1923)

Fred Thomas Wigington (December 16, 1897 – May 8, 1980) was a Major League Baseball pitcher who played in 1923 with the St. Louis Cardinals.

Wigington was a very successful amateur and minor league pitcher before his brief Major League career. In 1922, he led the Nebraska State League with 261 strikeouts. He had a reputation for having an effective curveball but less remarkable fastball.
