= Rogers, Nebraska =

- Village
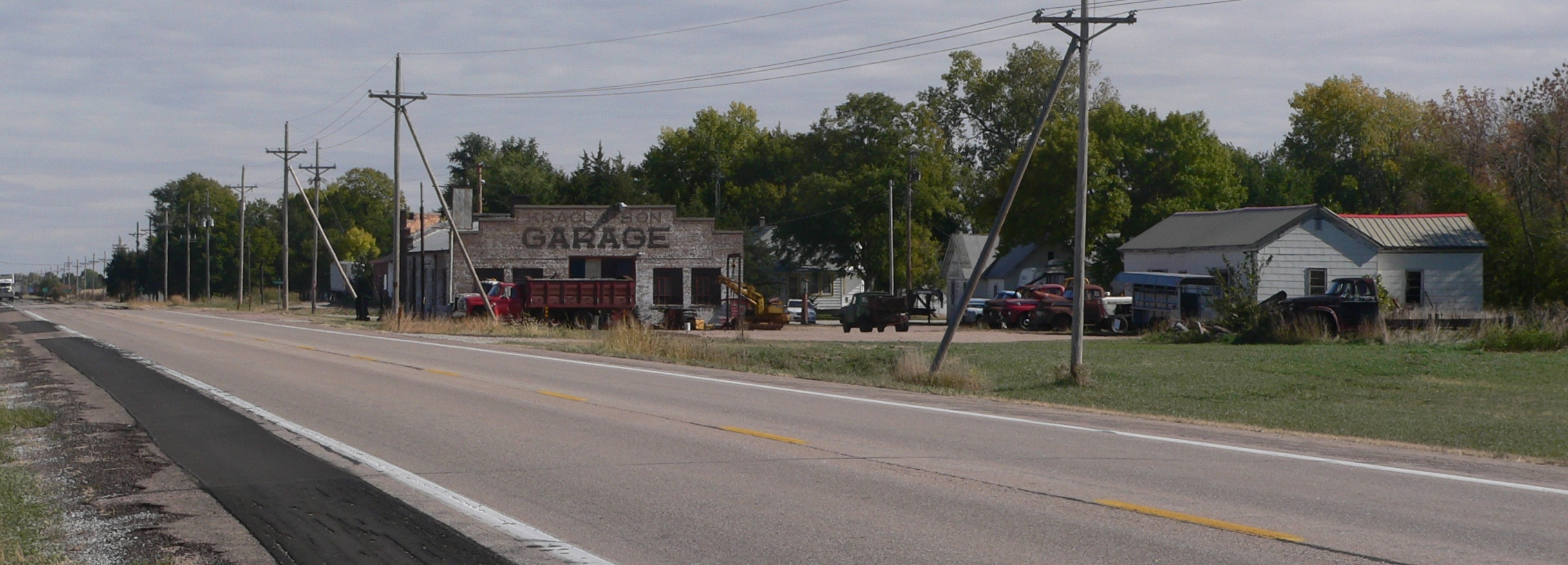
- Rogers, seen from U.S. Highway 30

- Location of Rogers, Nebraska
- Coordinates: 41°27′52″N 96°54′57″W
- Country: United States
- State: Nebraska
- County: Colfax

Area
  - Total: 0.17 sq mi (0.44 km^{2})
  - Land: 0.17 sq mi (0.44 km^{2})
  - Water: 0 sq mi (0.00 km^{2})
- Elevation: 1,312 ft (400 m)

Population (2020)
  - Total: 82
  - Density: 483.6/sq mi (186.73/km^{2})
- Time zone: UTC-6 (Central (CST))
  - Summer (DST): UTC-5 (CDT)
- ZIP code: 68659
- Area code: 402
- FIPS code: 31-42145
- GNIS feature ID: 2399111

Rogers is a village in Colfax County, Nebraska, United States. As of the 2020 census, Rogers had a population of 82.

== History ==
Rogers was platted in 1886. It was named for a railroad official.

Rogers was a shipping point on the Union Pacific Railroad.

A post office opened at Rogers in 1883, closed in 1885, reopened in 1887, and closed permanently in 1988.

== Geography ==
According to the United States Census Bureau, the village has a total area of 0.17 square miles (0.44 km^{2}), all land.

== Demographics ==
Historical population
Census	Pop.	Note	%±
1900	124		—
1910	155		25.0%
1920	128		−17.4%
1930	138		7.8%
1940	121		−12.3%
1950	113		−6.6%
1960	162		43.4%
1970	95		−41.4%
1980	89		−6.3%
1990	89		0.0%
2000	95		6.7%
2010	95		0.0%
2020	82		−13.7%
U.S. Decennial Census

=== 2010 census ===
As of the census of 2010, there were 95 people, 33 households, and 24 families residing in the village. The population density was 558.8 inhabitants per square mile (215.8/km^{2}). There were 40 housing units at an average density of 235.3 per square mile (90.8/km^{2}). The racial makeup of the village was 80.0% White, 12.6% from other races, and 7.4% from two or more races. Hispanic or Latino of any race were 31.6% of the population.

There were 33 households, of which 39.4% had children under the age of 18 living with them, 63.6% were married couples living together, 6.1% had a female householder with no husband present, 3.0% had a male householder with no wife present, and 27.3% were non-families. 24.2% of all households were made up of individuals, and 9.1% had someone living alone who was 65 years of age or older. The average household size was 2.88 and the average family size was 3.50.

The median age in the village was 36.9 years. 20% of residents were under the age of 18; 8.5% were between the ages of 18 and 24; 33.7% were from 25 to 44; 24.3% were from 45 to 64; and 13.7% were 65 years of age or older. The gender makeup of the village was 52.6% male and 47.4% female.

=== 2000 census ===
As of the census of 2000, there were 95 people, 32 households, and 19 families residing in the village. The population density was 558.6 inhabitants per square mile (215.7/km^{2}). There were 36 housing units at an average density of 211.7 per square mile (81.7/km^{2}). The racial makeup of the village was 82.11% White, 17.89% from other races. Hispanic or Latino of any race were 29.47% of the population.

There were 32 households, out of which 40.6% had children under the age of 18 living with them, 56.3% were married couples living together, 3.1% had a female householder with no husband present, and 40.6% were non-families. 28.1% of all households were made up of individuals, and 9.4% had someone living alone who was 65 years of age or older. The average household size was 2.97 and the average family size was 4.00.

In the village, the population was spread out, with 30.5% under the age of 18, 7.4% from 18 to 24, 34.7% from 25 to 44, 17.9% from 45 to 64, and 9.5% who were 65 years of age or older. The median age was 34 years. For every 100 females, there were 115.9 males. For every 100 females age 18 and over, there were 144.4 males.

As of 2000 the median income for a household in the village was $40,625, and the median income for a family was $36,875. Males had a median income of $26,875 versus $26,875 for females. The per capita income for the village was $15,374. There were no families and 7.0% of the population living below the poverty line, including no under eighteens and 80.0% of those over 64.

== Notable person ==
- Fred Wigington, baseball player
