= Howells, Nebraska =

- Village
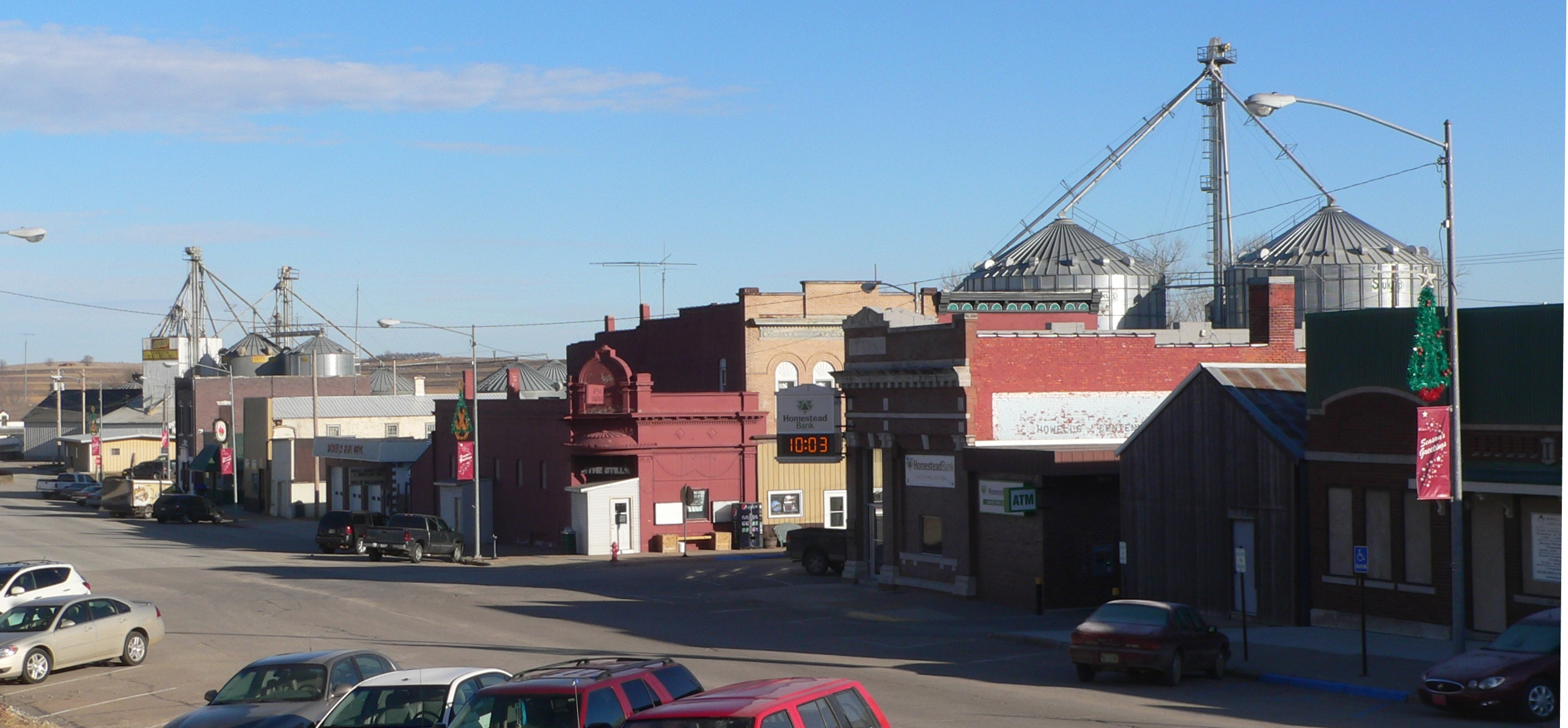
- Downtown Howells (2011)

- Location within Colfax County and Nebraska
- Coordinates: 41°43′27″N 97°00′16″W
- Country: United States
- State: Nebraska
- County: Colfax

Area
  - Total: 0.58 sq mi (1.49 km^{2})
  - Land: 0.58 sq mi (1.49 km^{2})
  - Water: 0 sq mi (0.00 km^{2})
- Elevation: 1,490 ft (450 m)

Population (2020)
  - Total: 561
  - Density: 973.3/sq mi (375.78/km^{2})
- Time zone: UTC-6 (Central (CST))
  - Summer (DST): UTC-5 (CDT)
- ZIP code: 68641
- Area code: 402
- FIPS code: 31-23340
- GNIS feature ID: 2398549
- Website: Village website

Howells is a village in Colfax County, Nebraska, United States. As of the 2020 census, Howells had a population of 561.

== History ==
Howells was platted in 1886 when the Fremont, Elkhorn and Missouri Valley Railroad was extended to that point. It was named for James Smith Howell, a local resident. The Howells post office, established in 1886, was spelled as Howell (without the S) until 1937.

== Geography ==
According to the United States Census Bureau, the village has a total area of 0.58 square miles (1.50 km^{2}), all land.

Howells is in northern Colfax County in east-central Nebraska, three miles east of the junction of highways 15 and 91. Howells lies 40 miles (64 km) southeast of Norfolk, 40 miles (64 km) northeast of Columbus, 40 miles (64 km) northwest of Fremont, 80 miles (130 km) northwest of Omaha and 85 miles (137 km) north of Lincoln.

=== Climate ===
Climate data for Howells, Nebraska (1991–2020)
Month	Jan	Feb	Mar	Apr	May	Jun	Jul	Aug	Sep	Oct	Nov	Dec	Year
Mean daily maximum °F (°C)	33.3 (0.7)	37.9 (3.3)	51.0 (10.6)	62.6 (17.0)	73.1 (22.8)	83.1 (28.4)	86.5 (30.3)	83.8 (28.8)	78.3 (25.7)	65.4 (18.6)	49.8 (9.9)	36.9 (2.7)	61.8 (16.6)
Daily mean °F (°C)	23.3 (−4.8)	27.0 (−2.8)	38.7 (3.7)	49.8 (9.9)	61.4 (16.3)	71.9 (22.2)	75.5 (24.2)	72.7 (22.6)	65.3 (18.5)	52.6 (11.4)	38.4 (3.6)	27.0 (−2.8)	50.3 (10.2)
Mean daily minimum °F (°C)	13.4 (−10.3)	16.2 (−8.8)	26.5 (−3.1)	37.0 (2.8)	49.7 (9.8)	60.7 (15.9)	64.4 (18.0)	61.6 (16.4)	52.4 (11.3)	39.7 (4.3)	27.0 (−2.8)	17.2 (−8.2)	38.8 (3.8)
Average precipitation inches (mm)	0.47 (12)	0.74 (19)	1.46 (37)	3.10 (79)	4.25 (108)	4.97 (126)	3.09 (78)	3.64 (92)	2.94 (75)	2.22 (56)	1.04 (26)	0.84 (21)	28.76 (729)
Average snowfall inches (cm)	5.2 (13)	6.5 (17)	3.1 (7.9)	1.7 (4.3)	0.0 (0.0)	0.0 (0.0)	0.0 (0.0)	0.0 (0.0)	0.0 (0.0)	0.7 (1.8)	2.3 (5.8)	4.2 (11)	23.7 (60.8)
Source: NOAA

== Demographics ==
Historical population
Census	Pop.	Note	%±
1890	197		—
1900	515		161.4%
1910	800		55.3%
1920	904		13.0%
1930	952		5.3%
1940	861		−9.6%
1950	784		−8.9%
1960	694		−11.5%
1970	682		−1.7%
1980	677		−0.7%
1990	615		−9.2%
2000	632		2.8%
2010	561		−11.2%
2020	561		0.0%
U.S. Decennial Census

=== 2010 census ===
As of the census of 2010, there were 561 people, 244 households, and 154 families residing in the village. The population density was 967.2 inhabitants per square mile (373.4/km^{2}). There were 290 housing units at an average density of 500.0 per square mile (193.1/km^{2}). The racial makeup of the village was 97.0% White, 0.5% Native American, 0.4% Asian, 0.4% Pacific Islander, 0.2% from other races, and 1.6% from two or more races. Hispanic or Latino of any race were 2.0% of the population.

There were 244 households, of which 27.5% had children under the age of 18 living with them, 55.3% were married couples living together, 4.1% had a female householder with no husband present, 3.7% had a male householder with no wife present, and 36.9% were non-families. 34.4% of all households were made up of individuals, and 18.5% had someone living alone who was 65 years of age or older. The average household size was 2.30 and the average family size was 2.97.

The median age in the village was 44.9 years. 23.9% of residents were under the age of 18; 5.4% were between the ages of 18 and 24; 21% were from 25 to 44; 25.7% were from 45 to 64; and 24.1% were 65 years of age or older. The gender makeup of the village was 49.2% male and 50.8% female.

=== 2000 census ===
As of the census of 2000, there were 632 people, 281 households, and 182 families residing in the village. The population density was 1,126.8 inhabitants per square mile (435.1/km^{2}). There were 307 housing units at an average density of 547.3 per square mile (211.3/km^{2}). The racial makeup of the village was 97.78% White, 0.16% Native American, 0.47% Asian, 0.79% from other races, and 0.79% from two or more races. Hispanic or Latino of any race were 1.27% of the population.

There were 281 households, out of which 27.4% had children under the age of 18 living with them, 56.2% were married couples living together, 6.0% had a female householder with no husband present, and 34.9% were non-families. 33.1% of all households were made up of individuals, and 23.5% had someone living alone who was 65 years of age or older. The average household size was 2.25 and the average family size was 2.87.

In the village, the population was spread out, with 25.0% under the age of 18, 3.5% from 18 to 24, 24.2% from 25 to 44, 20.3% from 45 to 64, and 27.1% who were 6 years of age or older. The median age was 43 years. For every 100 females, there were 84.8 males. For every 100 females age 18 and over, there were 82.3 males.

As of 2000 the median income for a household in the village was $33,750, and the median income for a family was $40,000. Males had a median income of $25,417 versus $20,000 for females. The per capita income for the village was $17,433. About 1.6% of families and 6.0% of the population were below the poverty line, including 4.0% of those under age 18 and 11.4% of those age 65 or over.

== Economy ==
Major economic activities in the Howells area include crop production, cattle- and hog feeding, and wholesale and retail sales.

== Notable person ==
- Brad Vering, Olympic wrestler
