= Clarkson, Nebraska =

- City
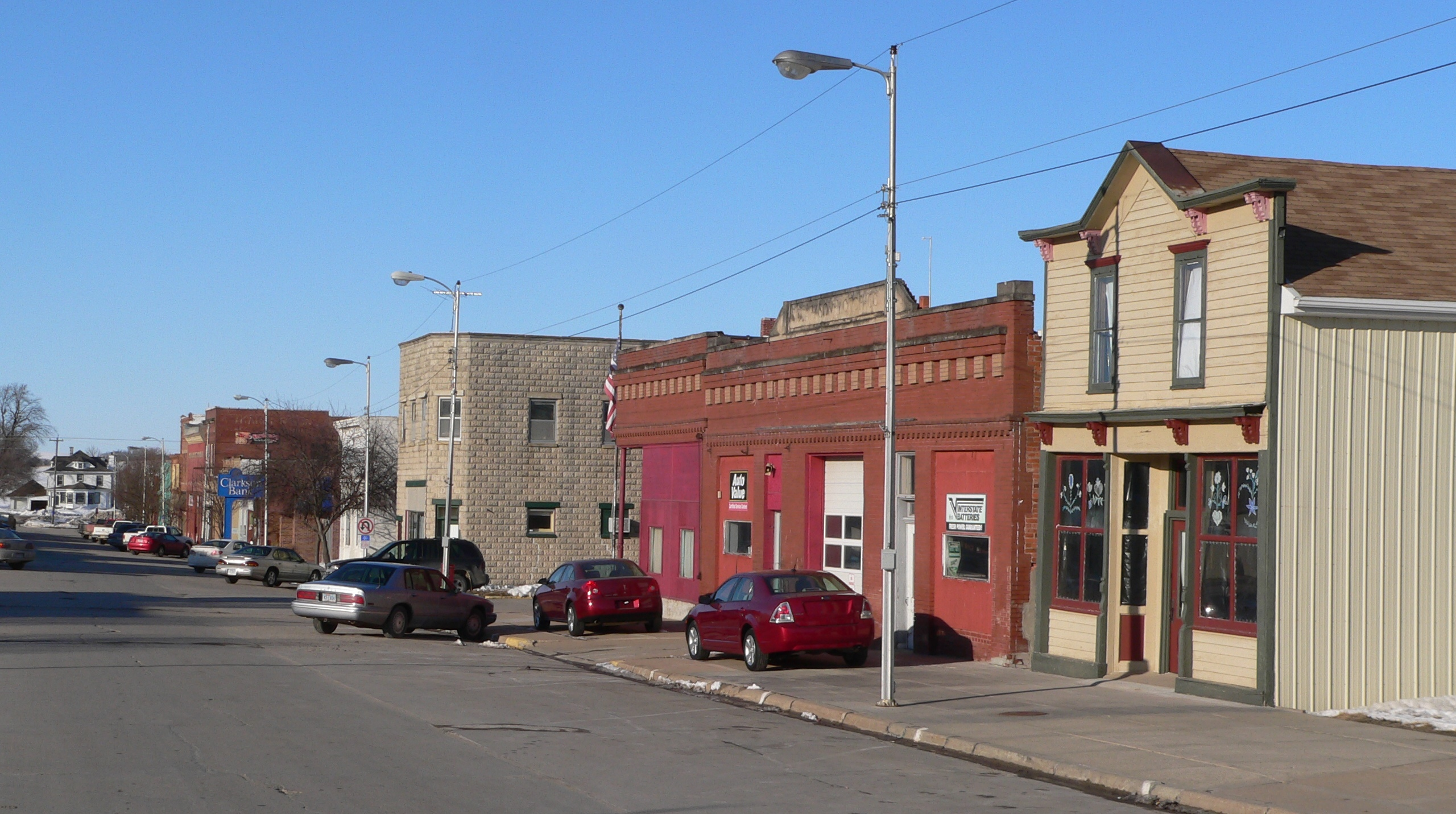
- Downtown Clarkson: east side of Pine Street

- Location of Clarkson, Nebraska
- Coordinates: 41°43′24″N 97°07′17″W
- Country: United States
- State: Nebraska
- County: Colfax

Area
  - Total: 0.79 sq mi (2.05 km^{2})
  - Land: 0.79 sq mi (2.05 km^{2})
  - Water: 0 sq mi (0.00 km^{2})
- Elevation: 1,526 ft (465 m)

Population (2020)
  - Total: 641
  - Density: 810.0/sq mi (312.75/km^{2})
- Time zone: UTC-6 (Central (CST))
  - Summer (DST): UTC-5 (CDT)
- ZIP code: 68629
- Area code: 402
- FIPS code: 31-09200
- GNIS feature ID: 2393542

Clarkson is a city in Colfax County, Nebraska, United States. As of the 2020 census, Clarkson had a population of 641.

== History ==
Clarkson was platted in 1886 when it was certain that a new railroad line extended to the site. It was named for T. S. Clarkson, a postal official who helped establish the town's first post office.

== Geography ==
According to the United States Census Bureau, the city has a total area of 0.79 square miles (2.05 km^{2}), all land.

Clarkson is located in northeast Nebraska, three miles west of the junction of Nebraska Highways 15 and 91. Clarkson lies 35 miles southeast of Norfolk; 35 miles northeast of Columbus; 85 miles northwest of Omaha; and 90 miles northwest of Lincoln.

== Demographics ==
Historical population
Census	Pop.	Note	%±
1890	147		—
1900	344		134.0%
1910	647		88.1%
1920	884		36.6%
1930	918		3.8%
1940	829		−9.7%
1950	764		−7.8%
1960	797		4.3%
1970	805		1.0%
1980	817		1.5%
1990	699		−14.4%
2000	685		−2.0%
2010	658		−3.9%
2020	641		−2.6%
U.S. Decennial Census

=== 2010 census ===
As of the census of 2010, there were 658 people, 285 households, and 168 families residing in the city. The population density was 832.9 inhabitants per square mile (321.6/km^{2}). There were 342 housing units at an average density of 432.9 per square mile (167.1/km^{2}). The racial makeup of the city was 98.3% White, 0.2% Pacific Islander, 0.9% from other races, and 0.6% from two or more races. Hispanic or Latino of any race were 2.6% of the population.

There were 285 households, of which 27.0% had children under the age of 18 living with them, 51.9% were married couples living together, 4.6% had a female householder with no husband present, 2.5% had a male householder with no wife present, and 41.1% were non-families. 38.6% of all households were made up of individuals, and 22.1% had someone living alone who was 65 years of age or older. The average household size was 2.16 and the average family size was 2.85.

The median age in the city was 48.9 years. 20.2% of residents were under the age of 18; 7.5% were between the ages of 18 and 24; 17.3% were from 25 to 44; 27.1% were from 45 to 64; and 27.8% were 65 years of age or older. The gender makeup of the city was 46.4% male and 53.6% female.

=== 2000 census ===
As of the census of 2000, there were 685 people, 311 households, and 185 families residing in the city. The population density was 999.3 inhabitants per square mile (385.8/km^{2}). There were 366 housing units at an average density of 533.9 per square mile (206.1/km^{2}). The racial makeup of the city was 99.12% White, 0.73% from other races, and 0.15% from two or more races. Hispanic or Latino of any race were 1.31% of the population.

There were 311 households, out of which 25.7% had children under the age of 18 living with them, 53.7% were married couples living together, 4.8% had a female householder with no husband present, and 40.5% were non-families. 38.9% of all households were made up of individuals, and 23.2% had someone living alone who was 65 years of age or older. The average household size was 2.20 and the average family size was 2.95.

In the city, the population was spread out, with 24.4% under the age of 18, 6.3% from 18 to 24, 25.1% from 25 to 44, 18.1% from 45 to 64, and 26.1% who were 65 years of age or older. The median age was 41 years. For every 100 females, there were 86.1 males. For every 100 females age 18 and over, there were 83.7 males.

As of 2000 the median income for a household in the city was $26,726, and the median income for a family was $36,094. Males had a median income of $25,625 versus $20,938 for females. The per capita income for the city was $14,189. About 6.5% of families and 9.1% of the population were below the poverty line, including 8.1% of those under age 18 and 15.5% of those age 65 or over.

== Government ==
=== County government ===
Colfax County is governed by three county commissioners who are elected by popular vote to four-year terms. Colfax County belongs to the Northeast Nebraska Economic Development District along with 12 other counties.

=== Municipal government ===
Clarkson, a second-class city, is governed by a mayor-council form of government who are elected to four-year terms.

=== Fire protection ===
Fire protection in the community is provided by a 34-member volunteer fire department. The Rural Fire Protection District provides fire protection for areas outside the community limits. The rescue squad has two units staffed by 25 EMTs and nine first responders.

=== Law enforcement ===
Clarkson utilizes the Colfax County Sheriff’s Department for its law enforcement.

== Points of interest ==
- Clarkson Public Library
- Clarkson Historical Museum
- Clarkson Opera House
- Memorial Park
- Bohemian National Garden
- Clarkson City Park

== Climate ==
This climatic region is typified by large seasonal temperature differences, with warm to hot (and often humid) summers and cold (sometimes severely cold) winters. According to the Köppen Climate Classification system, Clarkson has a humid continental climate, abbreviated "Dfa" on climate maps.

Climate data for Clarkson, Nebraska
Month	Jan	Feb	Mar	Apr	May	Jun	Jul	Aug	Sep	Oct	Nov	Dec	Year
Mean daily maximum °C (°F)	−1 (31)	3 (37)	8 (47)	17 (63)	23 (73)	28 (83)	31 (87)	29 (85)	24 (76)	18 (65)	8 (47)	2 (36)	16 (61)
Mean daily minimum °C (°F)	−12 (10)	−9 (15)	−4 (25)	3 (37)	9 (48)	14 (58)	17 (63)	16 (61)	11 (51)	4 (39)	−3 (26)	−9 (15)	3 (37)
Average precipitation mm (inches)	18 (0.7)	20 (0.8)	46 (1.8)	64 (2.5)	110 (4.3)	110 (4.5)	86 (3.4)	86 (3.4)	71 (2.8)	51 (2)	30 (1.2)	18 (0.7)	710 (27.9)
Source: Weatherbase
