= Colfax County, Nebraska =

County in Nebraska, United States

- County
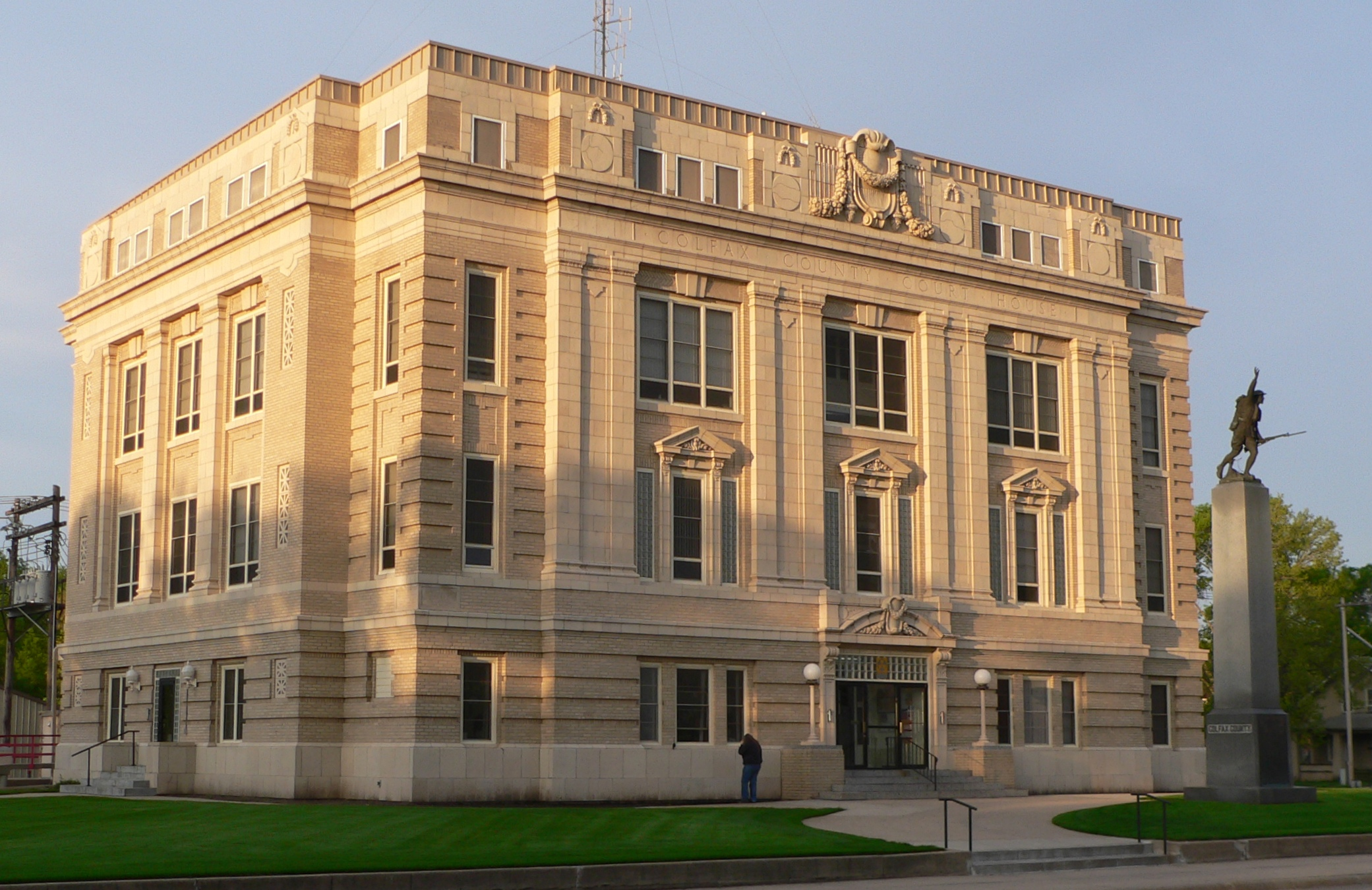
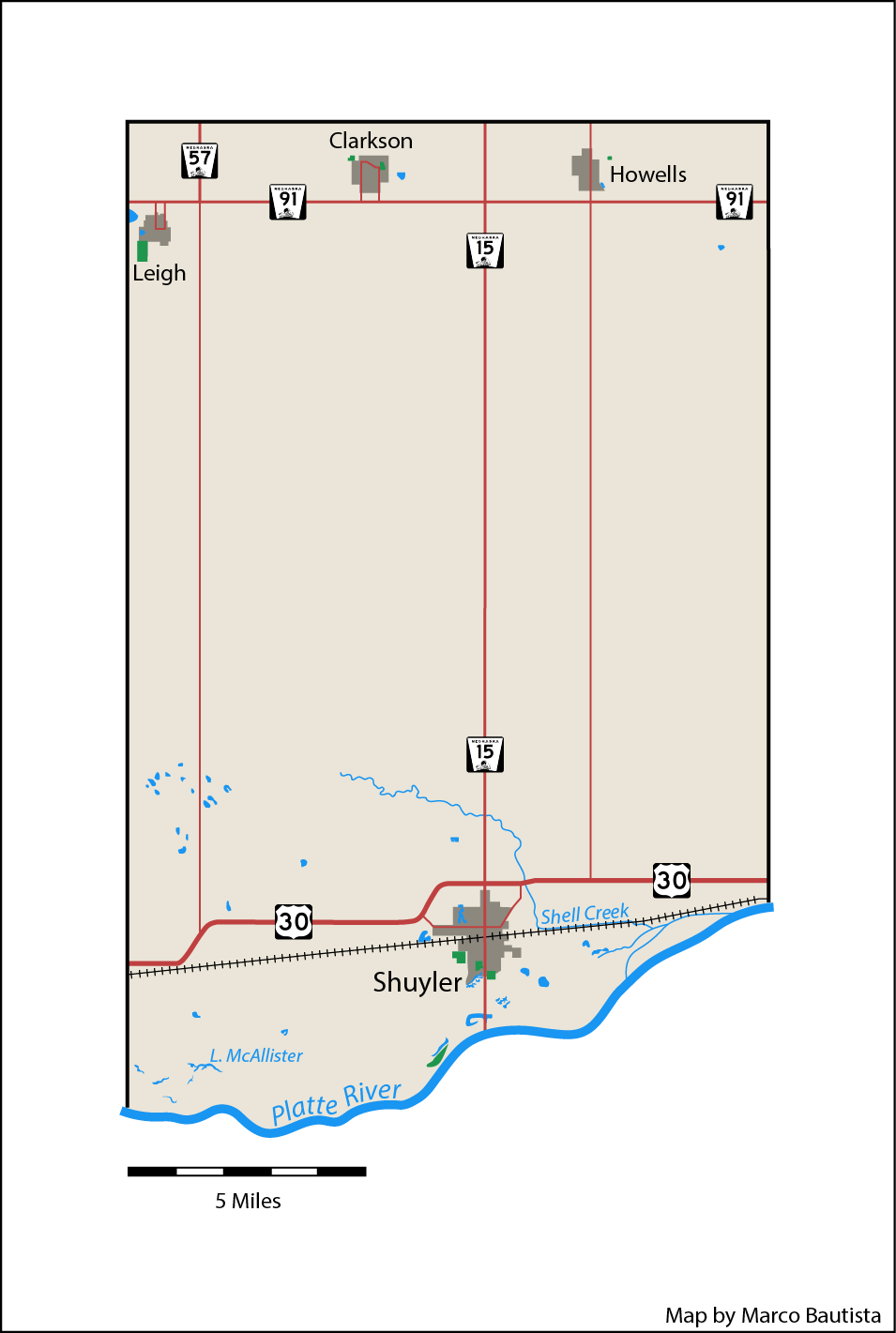
- The Colfax County Courthouse in Schuyler Colfax County, Nebraska

- Location within the U.S. state of Nebraska
- Coordinates: 41.57496°N 97.088945°W
- Country: United States
- State: Nebraska
- Founded: February 15, 1869
- Named for: Schuyler Colfax
- Seat: Schuyler
- Largest city: Schuyler

Area
  - Total: 416.517 sq mi (1,078.77 km^{2})
  - Land: 411.460 sq mi (1,065.68 km^{2})
  - Water: 5.057 sq mi (13.10 km^{2}) 1.21%

Population (2020)
  - Total: 10,582
  - Estimate (2025): 10,934 ▲
  - Density: 25.718/sq mi (9.9298/km^{2})
- Time zone: UTC−6 (Central)
  - Summer (DST): UTC−5 (CDT)
- Area code: 402 and 531
- Congressional district: 1st
- Website: colfaxcountyne.gov
- • Nebraska county number 19 • Nebraska license plate prefix 43

Colfax County is a county in the U.S. state of Nebraska. As of the 2020 census, the population was 10,582, and was estimated to be 10,934 in 2025. The county seat and the largest city is Schuyler.

In the Nebraska license plate system, Colfax County was represented by the prefix "43" (as it had the 43rd-largest number of vehicles registered in the state when the license plate system was established in 1922).

== History ==
The county and its seat are named after US Vice President (1869–1873) Schuyler Colfax.

Colfax County was created by the Nebraska legislature on February 15, 1869, as part of the division of Platte County into three parts. The new county was named for Schuyler Colfax, then the vice-president of the United States. The site of Shell Creek Station on the Union Pacific Railroad was chosen as the county seat, and renamed Schuyler also after Colfax. Schuyler was incorporated in 1870, and the county's first courthouse was constructed in 1872.

== Geography ==
According to the United States Census Bureau, the county has a total area of 416.517 square miles (1,078.77 km^{2}), of which 411.460 square miles (1,065.68 km^{2}) is land and 5.057 square miles (13.10 km^{2}) (1.21%) is water. It is the 86th-largest county in Nebraska by total area.

=== Major highways ===
- U.S. Highway 30
- Nebraska Highway 15
- Nebraska Highway 57
- Nebraska Highway 91

=== Transit ===
- Express Arrow

=== Adjacent counties ===
- Dodge County – east
- Butler County – south
- Platte County – west
- Stanton County – north
- Cuming County – northeast

== Demographics ==
Historical population
Census	Pop.	Note	%±
1870	1,424		—
1880	6,588		362.6%
1890	10,453		58.7%
1900	11,211		7.3%
1910	11,610		3.6%
1920	11,624		0.1%
1930	11,434		−1.6%
1940	10,627		−7.1%
1950	10,010		−5.8%
1960	9,595		−4.1%
1970	9,498		−1.0%
1980	9,890		4.1%
1990	9,139		−7.6%
2000	10,441		14.2%
2010	10,515		0.7%
2020	10,582		0.6%
2025 (est.)	10,934	▲	3.3%
U.S. Decennial Census; 1790–1960 1900–1990; 1990–2000 2010–2020

As of the third quarter of 2025, the median home value in Colfax County was $143,696.

As of the 2024 American Community Survey, there are 3,707 estimated households in Colfax County with an average of 2.85 persons per household. The county has a median household income of $82,530. Approximately 6.9% of the county's population lives at or below the poverty line. Colfax County has an estimated 69.1% employment rate, with 14.8% of the population holding a bachelor's degree or higher and 79.4% holding a high school diploma. There were 3,997 housing units at an average density of 9.71 per square mile (3.7/km^{2}).

The top five reported languages (people were allowed to report up to two languages, thus the figures will generally add to more than 100%) were English (55.4%), Spanish (40.4%), Indo-European (0.5%), Asian and Pacific Islander (0.3%), and Other (3.4%).

The median age in the county was 35.5 years.

Colfax County, Nebraska – racial and ethnic composition Note: the US Census treats Hispanic/Latino as an ethnic category. This table excludes Latinos from the racial categories and assigns them to a separate category. Hispanics/Latinos may be of any race.
Race / ethnicity (NH = non-Hispanic)	Pop. 1980	Pop. 1990	Pop. 2000	Pop. 2010	Pop. 2020
White alone (NH)	9,791 (99.00%)	8,878 (97.14%)	7,617 (72.95%)	6,031 (57.36%)	5,018 (47.42%)
Black or African American alone (NH)	2 (0.02%)	3 (0.03%)	5 (0.05%)	49 (0.47%)	375 (3.54%)
Native American or Alaska Native alone (NH)	7 (0.07%)	26 (0.28%)	17 (0.16%)	33 (0.31%)	26 (0.25%)
Asian alone (NH)	5 (0.05%)	7 (0.08%)	14 (0.13%)	24 (0.23%)	50 (0.47%)
Pacific Islander alone (NH)	—	—	3 (0.03%)	4 (0.04%)	2 (0.02%)
Other race alone (NH)	6 (0.06%)	1 (0.01%)	11 (0.11%)	17 (0.16%)	16 (0.15%)
Mixed race or multiracial (NH)	—	—	42 (0.40%)	42 (0.40%)	102 (0.96%)
Hispanic or Latino (any race)	79 (0.80%)	224 (2.45%)	2,732 (26.17%)	4,315 (41.04%)	4,993 (47.18%)
Total	9,890 (100.00%)	9,139 (100.00%)	10,441 (100.00%)	10,515 (100.00%)	10,582 (100.00%)

=== 2024 estimate ===
As of the 2024 estimate, there were 10,826 people, 3,707 households, and _ families residing in the county. The population density was 26.31 inhabitants per square mile (10.2/km^{2}). There were 3,997 housing units at an average density of 9.71 per square mile (3.7/km^{2}). The racial makeup of the county was 84.3% White (43.4% NH White), 7.5% African American, 4.0% Native American, 1.3% Asian, 0.7% Pacific Islander, _% from some other races and 2.3% from two or more races. Hispanic or Latino people of any race were 48.3% of the population.

=== 2020 census ===
As of the 2020 census, there were 10,582 people, 3,615 households, and 2,619 families residing in the county. The population density was 25.72 inhabitants per square mile (9.9/km^{2}). There were 3,976 housing units at an average density of 9.66 per square mile (3.7/km^{2}). The racial makeup of the county was 55.18% White, 3.57% African American, 2.84% Native American, 0.47% Asian, 0.02% Pacific Islander, 28.17% from some other races and 9.74% from two or more races. Hispanic or Latino people of any race were 47.18% of the population.

The median age was 34.5 years. 30.3% of residents were under the age of 18 and 13.7% of residents were 65 years of age or older. For every 100 females there were 104.6 males, and for every 100 females age 18 and over there were 107.6 males age 18 and over.

61.6% of residents lived in urban areas, while 38.4% lived in rural areas.

There were 3,615 households in the county, of which 39.5% had children under the age of 18 living with them and 19.1% had a female householder with no spouse or partner present. About 22.5% of all households were made up of individuals and 10.4% had someone living alone who was 65 years of age or older.

There were 3,976 housing units, of which 9.1% were vacant. Among occupied housing units, 72.2% were owner-occupied and 27.8% were renter-occupied. The homeowner vacancy rate was 0.8% and the rental vacancy rate was 5.1%.

== Communities ==
=== Cities ===
- Clarkson
- Schuyler (county seat)

=== Villages ===
- Howells
- Leigh
- Richland
- Rogers

== Politics ==
Colfax County voters are reliably Republican. In only one national election since 1936 did the county select the Democratic Party candidate.

United States presidential election results for Colfax County, Nebraska
Year	Republican		Democratic		Third party(ies)	
Year	No.	%	No.	%	No.	%
1900	1,033	42.63%	1,357	56.00%	33	1.36%
1904	1,180	53.03%	768	34.52%	277	12.45%
1908	1,159	46.68%	1,267	51.03%	57	2.30%
1912	620	29.52%	998	47.52%	482	22.95%
1916	897	34.78%	1,628	63.13%	54	2.09%
1920	1,992	66.29%	957	31.85%	56	1.86%
1924	1,450	39.02%	1,293	34.80%	973	26.18%
1928	1,432	34.14%	2,746	65.47%	16	0.38%
1932	648	13.56%	4,076	85.29%	55	1.15%
1936	1,644	32.39%	3,210	63.25%	221	4.35%
1940	2,587	52.28%	2,361	47.72%	0	0.00%
1944	2,314	51.51%	2,178	48.49%	0	0.00%
1948	1,928	50.41%	1,897	49.59%	0	0.00%
1952	3,332	69.56%	1,458	30.44%	0	0.00%
1956	2,843	65.07%	1,526	34.93%	0	0.00%
1960	2,504	55.91%	1,975	44.09%	0	0.00%
1964	1,972	47.19%	2,207	52.81%	0	0.00%
1968	2,264	64.48%	932	26.55%	315	8.97%
1972	2,799	71.66%	1,107	28.34%	0	0.00%
1976	2,364	57.34%	1,666	40.41%	93	2.26%
1980	3,259	73.17%	893	20.05%	302	6.78%
1984	2,999	74.68%	981	24.43%	36	0.90%
1988	2,329	59.75%	1,542	39.56%	27	0.69%
1992	1,915	46.21%	1,011	24.40%	1,218	29.39%
1996	1,954	55.23%	1,065	30.10%	519	14.67%
2000	2,338	70.53%	863	26.03%	114	3.44%
2004	2,589	71.26%	990	27.25%	54	1.49%
2008	2,018	63.00%	1,125	35.12%	60	1.87%
2012	2,051	66.83%	969	31.57%	49	1.60%
2016	2,171	67.55%	859	26.73%	184	5.72%
2020	2,636	70.75%	1,025	27.51%	65	1.74%
2024	2,636	74.91%	845	24.01%	38	1.08%

== Education ==
School districts include:

- North Bend Central Public Schools #595, North Bend
- Howells–Dodge Consolidated Schools #70, Howells
- Clarkson Public Schools #58, Clarkson
- Leigh Community Schools #39, Leigh
- Schuyler Community Schools #123, Schuyler

== See also ==
- National Register of Historic Places listings in Colfax County, Nebraska
