= Schuyler, Nebraska =

- City
- Location of Schuyler, Nebraska
- Coordinates: 41°26′59″N 97°03′43″W
- Country: United States
- State: Nebraska
- County: Colfax

Area
  - Total: 2.81 sq mi (7.28 km^{2})
  - Land: 2.73 sq mi (7.06 km^{2})
  - Water: 0.085 sq mi (0.22 km^{2})
- Elevation: 1,352 ft (412 m)

Population (2020)
  - Total: 6,547
  - Density: 2,401.0/sq mi (927.02/km^{2})
- Time zone: UTC-6 (Central (CST))
  - Summer (DST): UTC-5 (CDT)
- ZIP code: 68661
- Area code: 402
- FIPS code: 31-44035
- GNIS feature ID: 2396556
- Website: schuylernebraska.net

Schuyler is a city in Colfax County, Nebraska, United States. As of the 2020 census, Schuyler had a population of 6,547. It is the county seat of Colfax County. The city (as well as the county) is named after former Vice President of the United States, Schuyler Colfax.

== Geography ==
According to the United States Census Bureau, the city has a total area of 2.67 square miles (6.92 km^{2}), of which 2.58 square miles (6.68 km^{2}) is land and 0.09 square miles (0.23 km^{2}) is water.

== Demographics ==
Historical population
Census	Pop.	Note	%±
1880	1,017		—
1890	2,160		112.4%
1900	2,157		−0.1%
1910	2,152		−0.2%
1920	2,636		22.5%
1930	2,588		−1.8%
1940	2,808		8.5%
1950	2,883		2.7%
1960	3,096		7.4%
1970	3,597		16.2%
1980	4,151		15.4%
1990	4,052		−2.4%
2000	5,371		32.6%
2010	6,211		15.6%
2020	6,547		5.4%
U.S. Decennial Census; 2012 Estimate

=== 2020 census ===
As of the 2020 census, Schuyler had a population of 6,547. The median age was 29.2 years. 34.6% of residents were under the age of 18 and 9.4% of residents were 65 years of age or older. For every 100 females there were 103.1 males, and for every 100 females age 18 and over there were 107.3 males age 18 and over.

99.4% of residents lived in urban areas, while 0.6% lived in rural areas.

There were 1,936 households in Schuyler, of which 49.9% had children under the age of 18 living in them. Of all households, 52.2% were married-couple households, 17.9% were households with a male householder and no spouse or partner present, and 22.0% were households with a female householder and no spouse or partner present. About 19.0% of all households were made up of individuals and 8.7% had someone living alone who was 65 years of age or older. The average household size was 3.4 and the average family size was 3.7.

There were 2,032 housing units, of which 4.7% were vacant. The homeowner vacancy rate was 0.8% and the rental vacancy rate was 5.1%.

Racial composition as of the 2020 census
Race	Number	Percent
White	2,150	32.8%
Black or African American	317	4.8%
American Indian and Alaska Native	291	4.4%
Asian	34	0.5%
Native Hawaiian and Other Pacific Islander	1	0.0%
Some other race	2,854	43.6%
Two or more races	900	13.7%
Hispanic or Latino (of any race)	4,746	72.5%

=== Income and poverty ===
The 2016–2020 5-year American Community Survey estimates show that the median household income was $64,657 (with a margin of error of +/- $4,321) and the median family income $64,162 (+/- $6,233). Males had a median income of $35,584 (+/- $8,433) versus $31,163 (+/- $8,721) for females. The median income for those above 16 years old was $32,283 (+/- $3,452). Approximately, 7.9% of families and 13.8% of the population were below the poverty line, including 10.9% of those under the age of 18 and 8.3% of those ages 65 or over.

=== 2010 census ===
As of the census of 2010, there were 6,211 people, 1,828 households, and 1,356 families residing in the city. The population density was 2,407.4 inhabitants per square mile (929.5/km^{2}). There were 1,972 housing units at an average density of 764.3 per square mile (295.1/km^{2}). The racial makeup of the city was 56.7% White, 1.3% African American, 1.7% Native American, 0.2% Asian, 37.0% from other races, and 3.0% from two or more races. Hispanic or Latino of any race were 65.4% of the population.

There were 1,828 households, of which 49.9% had children under the age of 18 living with them, 54.0% were married couples living together, 12.0% had a female householder with no husband present, 8.2% had a male householder with no wife present, and 25.8% were non-families. 21.2% of all households were made up of individuals, and 11.1% had someone living alone who was 65 years of age or older. The average household size was 3.37 and the average family size was 3.81.

The median age in the city was 28.5 years. 33.8% of residents were under the age of 18; 10.4% were between the ages of 18 and 24; 27.7% were from 25 to 44; 18.3% were from 45 to 64; and 9.7% were 65 years of age or older. The gender makeup of the city was 51.3% male and 48.7% female.

=== 2000 census ===
As of the census of 2000, there were 5,371 people, 1,748 households, and 1,214 families residing in the city. The population density was 2,590.1 inhabitants per square mile (1,000.0/km^{2}). There were 1,856 housing units at an average density of 895.0 per square mile (345.6/km^{2}). The racial makeup of the city was 69.30% White, 0.11% African American, 0.26% Native American, 0.28% Asian, 0.24% Pacific Islander, 27.37% from other races, and 2.44% from two or more races. Hispanic or Latino of any race were 45.11% of the population.

There were 1,748 households, out of which 37.7% had children under the age of 18 living with them, 55.0% were married couples living together, 9.0% had a female householder with no husband present, and 30.5% were non-families. 25.6% of all households were made up of individuals, and 16.6% had someone living alone who was 65 years of age or older. The average household size was 3.03 and the average family size was 3.52.

In the city, the population was spread out, with 29.7% under the age of 18, 10.7% from 18 to 24, 28.7% from 25 to 44, 16.5% from 45 to 64, and 14.4% who were 65 years of age or older. The median age was 31 years. For every 100 females, there were 108.9 males. For every 100 females age 18 and over, there were 108.8 males.

As of 2000 the median income for a household in the city was $37,170, and the median income for a family was $41,747. Males had a median income of $24,955 versus $20,615 for females. The per capita income for the city was $14,376. About 6.3% of families and 11.2% of the population were below the poverty line, including 14.8% of those under age 18 and 4.2% of those age 65 or over.

== Economy ==
Schuyler's single largest employer is the Cargill beef processing plant, with approximately 2,000 employees. The plant opened in 1968 as a Spencer Packing Co. facility. Other major employers include Schuyler Community Schools, with 245 employees; Alegent Health Memorial Hospital, with 82 full-time and 31 part-time employees; and QC Supply, a manufacturer and distributor of farm and ranch supplies with 75 full-time employees.

== History ==
In 1866, the Union Pacific Railroad reached present-day Schuyler, at the time known as Shell Creek Station. Three years later, the Nebraska State Legislature divided large Platte County into three smaller counties, including Colfax County. In 1870, Shell Creek Station was renamed Schuyler.

In 1870, the Union Pacific chose the town as the point at which Texas cattle being driven north would be loaded onto trains. With this, Schuyler became Nebraska's first "cow town". However, the resulting boom, which saw a six-fold increase in the town's population (from 100 to 600) and around 50,000 head of cattle pass through, was only temporary: the next year, the terminus of the cattle trail had moved west to Kearney.

The city's early residents were Czech, Irish, and German settlers. Settlement was enabled by Schuyler's geographic position, which caused the community to be associated with a number of historic overland transportation routes, including:

- Oregon Trail (1836–1869)
- Mormon Trail (1840s–1850s)
- Transcontinental Railway (1866–present)
- Coast-to-coast Lincoln Highway (1913–1925)

Beginning in the late 1980s, reductions in wages at the Cargill beef processing plant led to a change in Schuyler's demographic makeup. By 2017, an estimated 60% of the population was Latino, and immigrants from other parts of the world, including Somalia and Thailand, had also moved to the city.

In December 2020, the Schuyler City Council voted to reject the formation of a board of health, which would have potentially resulted in a mask mandate. In January 2021, the city council voted to establish a board of health and appointed members, after two previous attempts failed. The council passed a revised ordinance which gave the board power to only suggest actions to the city council.

In March 2021, law enforcement sent a letter to Schuyler Community Schools complaining about an incident on February 24, 2021 involving a student. Law enforcement also said the relationship between the two entities was strained.

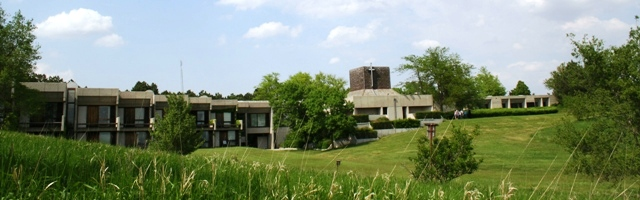
Christ the King Priory

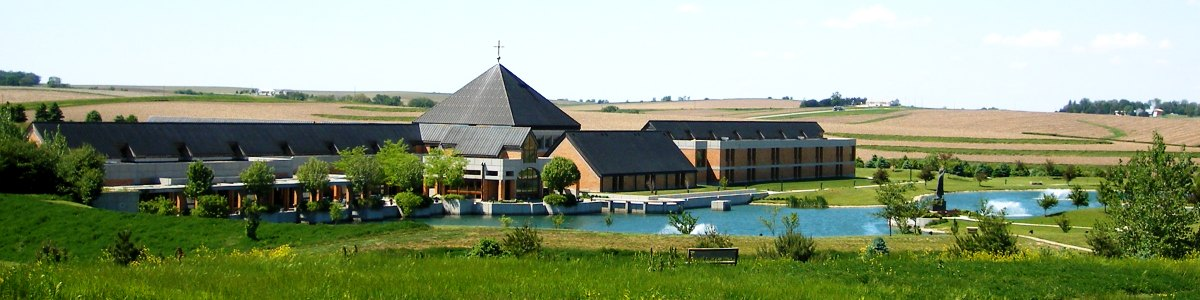
Saint Benedict Center

== Attractions ==
In 1935, monks from the Congregation of Missionary Benedictines of Saint Ottilien established a community in Schuyler as a means of supporting the congregation's missions in Africa and Asia. At present, Christ the King Priory is home to 11 monks. The monks' apostolate has expanded to providing retreats at the recently constructed Saint Benedict Center, four miles north of Schuyler.

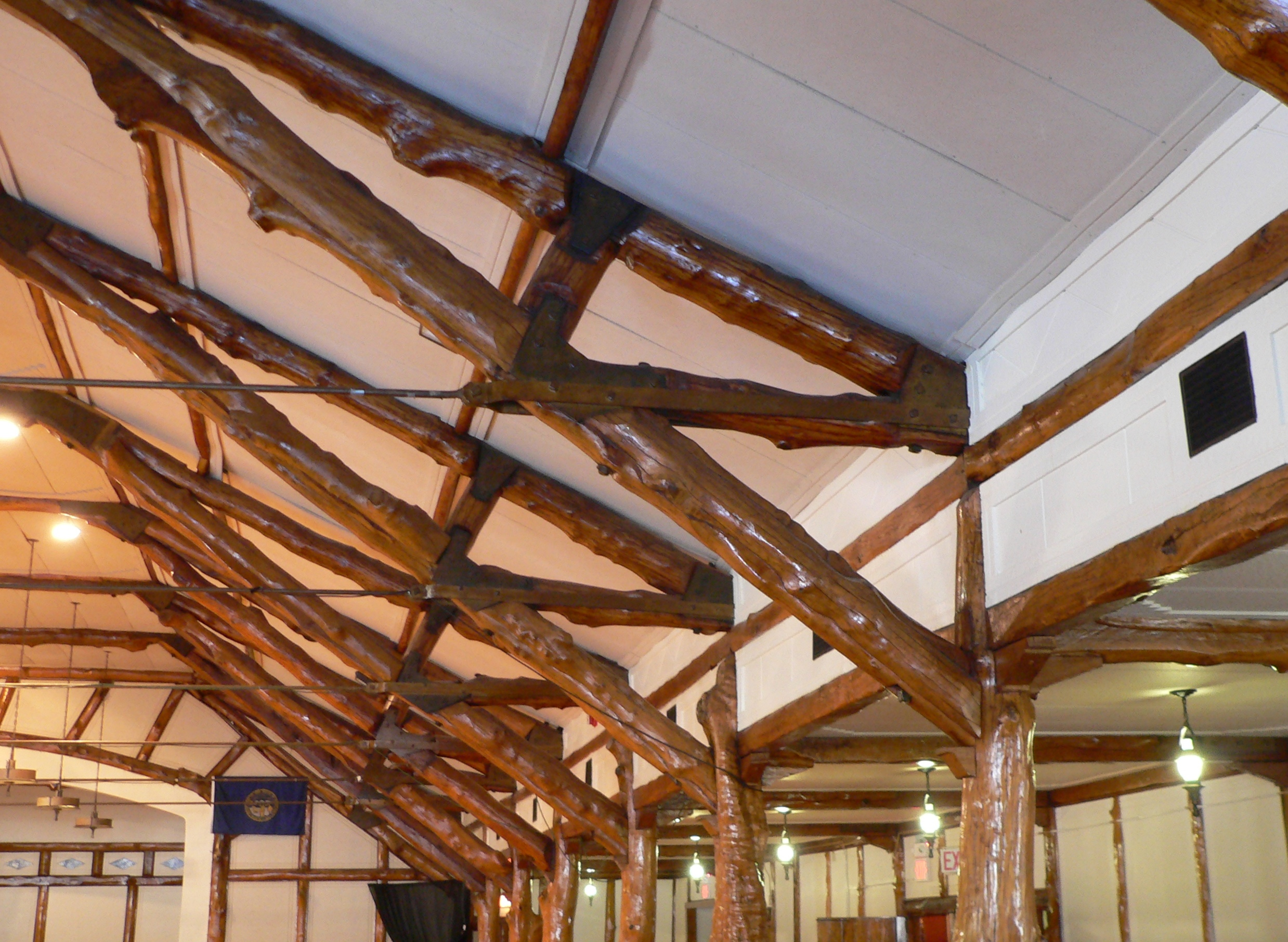
The Oak Ballroom's ceiling beams

The Oak Ballroom, completed by the Works Progress Administration in 1937 and now listed on the National Register of Historic Places, was built using dozens of native oak trees hauled to the building site from the nearby Platte River using horses and wagons.

== Transportation ==
Intercity bus service to the city is provided by Express Arrow.

== Notable people ==
- Kyle Emanuel, professional American football player for the Los Angeles Chargers
- Chuck Jura, professional basketball player
- John C. Karel, Wisconsin judge and state legislator, was born in Schuyler.
- Kim Sigler, 40th Governor of Michigan, was born in Schuyler.
