= Senator Bloom =

Senator Bloom may refer to:

- Bill Bloom (Nebraska politician) (1928–1986), Nebraska State Senate
- Isaac Bloom (1747–1803), New York State Senate
- Jeremiah B. Bloom (1913–1983), New York State Senate
- Moses Bloom (1833–1893), Iowa State Senate
- Prescott E. Bloom (1942–1986), Illinois State Senate
