= Senator Rasmussen =

Senator Rasmussen may refer to:

- A. L. Rasmussen (1909–1993), Washington State Senate
- Dennis F. Rasmussen (born 1947), Maryland State Senate
- Dennis L. Rasmussen (1929–2018), Nebraska State Senate
- Eric Rasmussen (politician) (1926–2006), Nebraska State Senate
- Jessie Rasmussen (born 1945), Nebraska State Senate
- Ross Rasmussen (1917–2010), Nebraska State Senate

== See also ==
- Holger Rasmusen (1894–1983), Wisconsin State Senate
