= Glenn Goodrich =

American politician from Nebraska

Member of the Nebraska Legislature from the 20th district
- In office January 5, 1971 – January 9, 1991
- Preceded by: Bill Bloom
- Succeeded by: Jessie Rasmussen

Personal details
- Born: February 22, 1925 Orson, Iowa
- Died: January 23, 2003 (aged 77) Omaha, Nebraska
- Party: Democratic
- Spouse: Gaynelle Tusha (m. 1950)
- Children: 3 (D'Arcy, Gregory, Christopher)
- Education: Creighton University (B.A.)
- Occupation: Real estate developer

Glenn A. Goodrich (February 22, 1925 – January 23, 2003) was an American politician who represented Nebraska's 20th District, a part of Omaha, in the Nebraska State Legislature from 1971 to 1991. He was elected on November 3, 1970, by a margin of 19 votes over incumbent Bill Bloom.

Senator Goodrich was the only member of the Nebraska legislature to oppose a measure to outlaw marital sexual assault introduced by Senator Wally Barnett. Goodrich's position was strongly attacked by Senator Ernie Chambers of Omaha. In spite of Goodrich's opposition, in 1975 Nebraska became the first state in the US to make sexual assault within marriage illegal by statute. Historian Joann M. Ross observed that "Senator Goodrich did not seem to recognize sexual assault as a violent act."

He lost the primary election of 1990. Goodrich died on January 23, 2003, at the age of 77. The University of Nebraska at Omaha (UNO) awards a scholarship named for Senator Goodrich to students who attend only UNO and no other college.
