= Senator Jensen =

Senator Jensen may refer to:

- Carl Jensen (politician) (1920–1988), Minnesota State Senate
- Jim Jensen (Nebraska politician) (1934–2023), Nebraska State Senate
- Kevin D. Jensen (born 1954), South Dakota State Senate
- Phil Jensen (born 1952), South Dakota State Senate
- Scott Jensen (Minnesota politician) (born 1954), Minnesota State Senate
- Tom Jensen (1948–2026), Kentucky State Senate
- Vicki Jensen (born 1965), Minnesota State Senate
