= L. K. Emry =

American politician (1911–1992)

Member of the Nebraska Legislature from the 26th district
- In office April 22, 1978 – January 3, 1979
- Preceded by: Wally Barnett
- Succeeded by: Don Wesely

Personal details
- Born: February 20, 1911 Panama, Nebraska
- Died: March 30, 1992 (aged 81) Lincoln, Nebraska
- Party: Democratic
- Spouse: Norma
- Occupation: Railroad machinist, lobbyist

Louis Knar "L. K." Emry (February 20, 1911 – March 30, 1992) was a Democratic politician from Nebraska who served as a member of the Nebraska Legislature from the 26th district from 1978 to 1979.

== Early life ==
Emry was born in Panama, Nebraska, in 1911, and attended Panama Public High School and the University of Nebraska. He worked as a machinist for the Burlington Railroad in Havelock. Emry was a leader in the Lincoln-area labor movement, serving as the president of the Lincoln Central Labor Union and as a union lobbyist.

== Nebraska Legislature ==
In 1964, following redistricting, Emry ran for the Nebraska Legislature in the 26th district, which was based in Lancaster County. He faced six opponents in the nonpartisan primary election, and ultimately placed fourth, winning 11 percent of the vote to John E. Knight's 39 percent and James Studnicka's 20 percent.

Following the resignation of State Senator Wally Barnett in 1978 to serve as state fire marshal, Governor J. James Exon appointed Emry to serve out the remainder of Barnett's term. Emry was sworn in on April 22, 1978, and declined to seek re-election, instead opting to support Don Wesely.

== Death ==
Emry died on March 30, 1992.
