= Jessie Rasmussen =

American politician

Jessie Kerrey Rasmussen

Member of the Nebraska Legislature from the 20th district
- In office January 9, 1991 – January 4, 1995
- Preceded by: Glenn Goodrich
- Succeeded by: Jim Jensen

Personal details
- Born: April 1, 1945 (age 81) Chicago, Illinois
- Party: Democratic
- Spouse: Dean F. Rasmussen (m. 1967)
- Children: 2 (Jennifer, Janine)
- Relatives: Bob Kerrey (brother)
- Education: University of Nebraska–Lincoln (B.S., M.S.)
- Occupation: Parent-infant teacher

Jessie Kerrey Rasmussen (born April 1, 1945) is a Democratic politician and policymaker from Nebraska who served as a member of the Nebraska Legislature from the 20th district from 1991 to 1995. She is the sister of former Governor and U.S. Senator Bob Kerrey.

== Early life ==
Jessie Kerrey was born in Chicago, Illinois, and graduated from Lincoln Northeast High School in 1963. She then attended the University of Nebraska, where she graduated with her bachelor's degree in 1967, and married Dean Rasmussen in 1967. She worked as a parent-infant teacher at the Meyer Rehabilitation Institute at the University of Nebraska Medical Center.

== Nebraska Legislature ==
In 1990, Rasmussen ran for the Nebraska Legislature against incumbent State Senator Glenn Goodrich in the 20th district, which was based in Omaha. In the primary, she ran against Goodrich, union official John P. Cavanaugh, and lawyer Jim Riha. Though the race was formally nonpartisan, Cavanaugh, Goodrich, and Rasmussen were all Democrats, and Riha was a Republican. Rasmussen narrowly placed first, winning 29 percent of the vote to Riha's 27 percent, Goodrich's 23 percent, and Cavanaugh's 21 percent. Rasmussen advanced to the general election against Riha. She narrowly defeated him, winning 51 percent of the vote to his 49 percent, a margin of just 168 votes. Though Riha considered seeking a recount, he ultimately declined to do so.

While Rasmussen was serving in the legislature, state Attorney General Don Stenberg's office issued an opinion concluding that she was violating the state constitution's prohibition on dual-officeholding by continuing to hold her job at the University of Nebraska Medical Center. Rasmussen ultimately opted to continue working for the Institute by altering the source of her salary from a federal grant to a non-state agency, and considered proposing an amendment to the state constitution that would create an exception to the dual-officeholding restriction.

Rasmussen ran for re-election to a second term in 1994. She was challenged by businessman Jim Jensen, a Republican. In the primary election, Jensen placed first over Rasmussen by a wide margin, receiving 61 percent of the vote to her 39 percent. In the general election, Jensen defeated Rasmussen, winning 57 percent of the vote to her 43 percent, which both candidates attributed to Rasmussen's opposition to the death penalty and Jensen's emphasis on "law-and-order" messaging.

== Post-legislative career ==
In 1995, Governor Ben Nelson appointed Rasmussen as the Director of the Governor's Children and Family Policy Office. She was named deputy director of the Nebraska Department of Social Services in 1995. In 1996, the legislature established the current Department of Health and Human Services, and Rasmussen was named as the Director of the Department of Services within the new department.

When Republican Mike Johanns was elected Governor in 1998, he announced that he would dismiss Rasmussen, along with most other Nelson administration officials, from her position. In 1999, Iowa Governor Tom Vilsack appointed Rasmussen as the Director of the Iowa Department of Human Services. In 2002, following the controversial 2000 death of a toddler whose abuse had been reported to the department, Vilsack fired Rasmussen.

In 2005, the Nebraska Children and Families Foundation named Rasmussen as its early childhood policy director. She later joined the Buffett Early Childhood Fund as vice president, and then later as president.
