= John E. Knight =

American politician (1925–1999)

John Knight

Member of the Nebraska Legislature from the 26th district
- In office January 5, 1965 – January 5, 1971
- Preceded by: Fred Gottschalk (redistricted)
- Succeeded by: Wally Barnett

Personal details
- Born: May 14, 1925 Lincoln, Nebraska
- Died: January 13, 1999 (aged 73) Sun City, Arizona
- Spouse: Ruth Irene Bintz (m. 1946)
- Children: 4 (Kristine Louise, Mary Jo, Barbara Jean, Jan Elizabeth)
- Parent: George A. Knight (father)
- Education: Nebraska Wesleyan University; Garrett School of Theology; University of Nebraska
- Occupation: Minister, teacher, coach

John E. Knight (May 14, 1925 – January 13, 1999) was an American politician from Nebraska who served as a member of the Nebraska Legislature from the 26th district from 1965 to 1971.

== Early life ==
Knight was born in Lincoln, Nebraska, in 1925, and graduated from Lincoln Northeast High School. He graduated from the Nebraska Wesleyan University and the Garrett School of Theology, and completed graduate coursework at the University of Nebraska. Knight was an ordained Methodist minister and an insurance agent, owning and operating the Gates-Knight Insurance Agency.

== Nebraska Legislature ==
In 1964, following redistricting, Knight ran for the state legislature from the 26th district, which was based in Lancaster County. Knight ran in a crowded field in the nonpartisan primary, and faced machinist L. K. Emry, former State Senator Henry Heiliger, tavern manager James Studnicka, real estate broker William Swearingen, attorney David Thomas, and real estate agent Charles Wilcox. Knight placed first in the primary, winning 39 percent of the vote to Studnicka's 20 percent, Knight and Studnicka advanced to the general election, where Knight won by a wide margin, receiving 59 percent of the vote to Studnicka's 41 percent. Though members of the state legislature were elected in nonpartisan races, Knight was a registered Republican.

Knight ran for re-election in 1966. He was challenged by retired postal clerk Rudolph Anderson and transmission worker Eugene Newburn. Knight placed first in the primary election by a wide margin, winning 78 percent of the vote to Anderson's 13 percent and Newburn's 9 percent. Knight and Anderson advanced to the general election, where Knight won re-election in a landslide, winning 75 percent of the vote.

In 1970, Knight declined to seek re-election to a third term, citing the "increased demands of business interests."

== Post-legislative career ==
In 1979, Governor Charles Thone appointed Knight as the director of the state Department of Welfare. He was appointed Thone's chief of staff in 1981, and relocated to Sun City, Arizona, in 1987 with his wife.

== Death ==
Knight died on January 13, 1999.
