= Wally Barnett =

American politician (1931–2016)

Nebraska State Fire Marshal
- In office April 22, 1978 – July 8, 1991
- Preceded by: Paul Sarnecki
- Succeeded by: Mike Durst

Member of the Nebraska Legislature from the 26th district
- In office January 5, 1971 – April 22, 1978
- Preceded by: John E. Knight
- Succeeded by: L. K. Emry

Personal details
- Born: February 7, 1931 Lincoln, Nebraska
- Died: March 18, 2016 (aged 85) Lincoln, Nebraska
- Resting place: Lincoln Memorial Park, Lincoln, Nebraska
- Spouse: Beverly Teague (m. 1953)
- Children: 3 (Joni, Scott, Bobbi Rae)
- Education: University of Nebraska
- Occupation: Firefighter

Wallace M. Barnett Jr. (February 7, 1931 – March 18, 2016) was an American politician, women's rights advocate, and fire safety advocate who represented Nebraska's 26th District in the Nebraska State Legislature from 1971 to 1978. He went by the nickname Wally.

He is notable for introducing the first state law against sexually assaulting one's spouse in the United States. Laws patterned on it spread to other states.

== Early life ==
Barnett was born in Lincoln, Nebraska in 1931 and attended the University of Nebraska.

Before he was elected to office, Barnett was firefighter with the Lincoln Fire Department for 14 years. He was among firefighters who were unable to save a mother and baby trapped in a burning house in Havelock on the day after Christmas of 1965. After the fire Barnett declined to ride back to the fire station with his coworkers, and instead walked back to the fire station in his bunker gear. After his shift ended he laid down and cried. The incident deeply affected him, haunting him for decades.

== Legislature ==
As a state senator, Barnett's main concerns were juvenile justice procedures, women's rights, improved highway safety efforts, and improved state mental institutions. He was chairman of the Judiciary Committee.

=== Criminal sexual assault law ===
Second wave feminist activists and victim's advocates including Karen Flowers of the Lincoln Coalition against Rape encouraged reform of Nebraska's rape laws in the 1970s. In 1975 Barnett introduced a bill to repeal rape laws dating from the 19th century, and to replace them with a law using the term "criminal sexual assault" instead of "rape". This change in language applied to a broader range of unwanted sexual contact and was intended to make testimony less personal for those who were assaulted. The bill sought to "protect the dignity of the victim at all stages of the judicial process."

Unlike the old law, the new proposed law against sexual assault would have no exception for spousal assault. The new law would use gender-neutral language to designate the assailant and the person attacked, though Barnett was aware that women are more often targeted by sex criminals than men are.

Barnett's effort to outlaw spousal assault received strong support from Senators Ernie Chambers and Warren R. Swigart. Outlawing spousal assault passed nearly unanimously in the Legislature, with only Senator Glenn Goodrich voting against it. The new law made Nebraska the first state in the United States with a law against sexually assaulting one's spouse.

=== Domestic abuse law ===
In 1978 Barnett introduced the Protection from Domestic Abuse Act. The law channeled welfare funding to emergency shelter and counseling services for those subject to domestic violence and abuse, and required law enforcement officers to attend training programs on domestic violence. As of 2020 this law is still in force.

=== Eliminating anti-sodomy law ===
Barnett supported the repeal of anti-sodomy laws. The legislature voted to revise Nebraska's criminal code in 1977 to remove the state's ban on gay sex. Governor J. James Exon vetoed the revision. Barnett talked with Exon, and discovered that the governor was fearful of "perverts, homos, and gays." Barnett made a motion to override the governor's veto. This was successful, making Nebraska among the first states to legalize same-sex intercourse.

=== Other legislation ===
Barnett drafted a bill to legalize abortion in 1971, working together with NORAL, the Nebraska branch of NARAL. The bill was never introduced because it had little hope of passing. Barnett hoped that instead abortion could be legalized in court, because he felt that laws like Nebraska's were unconstitutional. His prediction would come true in 1973's Roe v. Wade court decision.

Barnett sponsored a measure requiring keepers of city jails to keep medical records of any procedures done to inmates.

== Later life ==
After deciding not to seek another term in the legislature, Barnett became the Nebraska State Fire Marshall in 1978. In 1991 he was called an "unsung fireworks hero" by the owner of Nebraska's largest fireworks business because his tough but fair approach to fire safety had made the fireworks industry safer. Barnett advocated for fire safety throughout his life.

He later served as Nebraska State Capitol head of Security. Barnett died in 2016 and was buried at Lincoln Memorial Park in his home city of Lincoln.

== Legacy ==
Other US states eliminated marital exceptions to rape laws in the 1970s, patterned on Nebraska's example in some cases. By 1993 all 50 states had made spousal sexual assault unlawful.

The law against spousal sexual assault that Barnett introduced was upheld and solidified by a Nebraska Supreme Court decision in 1986. This decision overturned a legal doctrine called "irrevocable consent" and confirmed that there is no spousal immunity for sexual assault in Nebraska. The court consulted the legislative transcripts of Senators Barnett and Chambers in affirming the intent of the law, and affirmed the arguments of feminist anti-rape activists, recognizing sexual assault as an act of violence rather than sexual passion.

Disturbed for decades by memories of the deaths by fire he witnessed as a firefighter, Barnett sought a way to prevent similar stress reactions in other firefighters. In 1987 he established the Nebraska Critical Incident Stress Debriefing Program, which provides volunteer peer crisis support to first responders.
