= Marital rape =

Rape of a victim by their spouse

Marital rape or spousal rape is the act of sexual intercourse with one's married spouse without the spouse's consent. The lack of consent is the essential element and does not always involve physical violence. Marital rape is considered a form of domestic violence and sexual abuse. While historically regarded as a right of husbands, the act is widely considered as rape in modern times and is becoming increasingly criminalized by many countries' laws. However, it remains unacknowledged by some more conservative cultures.

The issues of sexual and domestic violence within marriage and the family unit, and more specifically, the issue of violence against women, have come to growing international attention from the second half of the 20th century. Still, in many countries, marital rape either remains outside the criminal law, or is illegal but widely tolerated. Laws are rarely enforced, due to factors ranging from reluctance of authorities to pursue the crime, to lack of public knowledge that sexual intercourse in marriage without consent is illegal.

Marital rape is more widely experienced by women, though not exclusively. Marital rape is often a chronic form of violence for the victim which takes place within abusive relations. It exists in a complex web of state governments, cultural practices, and societal ideologies which combine to influence each distinct instance and situation in varying ways. The reluctance to define non-consensual sex between married couples as a crime and to prosecute has been attributed to traditional views of marriage, interpretations of religious doctrines, ideas about male and female sexuality, and to cultural expectations of subordination of a wife to her husband — views which continue to be common in many parts of the world. These views of marriage and sexuality started to be challenged in most Western countries from the 1960s and 70s especially by second-wave feminism, leading to an acknowledgment of the woman's right to self-determination of all matters relating to her body, and the withdrawal of the exemption or defense of marital rape.

Most countries criminalized marital rape from the late 20th century onward — very few legal systems allowed for the prosecution of rape within marriage before the 1970s. Criminalization has occurred through various ways, including removal of statutory exemptions from the definitions of rape, judicial decisions, explicit legislative reference in statutory law preventing the use of marriage as a defense, or creation of a specific offense of marital rape, albeit at a lower level of punishment. In many countries, it is still unclear whether marital rape is covered by the ordinary rape laws, but in some countries non-consensual sexual relations involving coercion may be prosecuted under general statutes prohibiting violence, such as assault and battery laws.

== History ==
Historically, in much of the world, rape was seen as a crime or tort of theft of a man's property (usually either a husband or father). In this case, property damage meant that the crime was not legally recognized as damage against the victim, but instead to her father or husband's property. Therefore, by definition a husband could not rape his wife. The view that a husband cannot be charged with the rape of his wife was described by Sir Matthew Hale (1609–1676) in History of the Pleas of the Crown, published posthumously in 1736, where he wrote that "The husband cannot be guilty of a rape committed by himself upon his lawful wife, for by their mutual consent and contract the wife hath given up herself in this kind unto her husband, which she cannot retract". Also, American and English law subscribed until the 20th century to the system of coverture, that is, a legal doctrine under which, upon marriage, a woman's legal rights were subsumed by those of her husband. The implication was that once unified by marriage, a spouse could no longer be charged with raping one's spouse, anymore than be charged with raping oneself.

Many jurisdictions, including all fifty U.S. states, had criminalized marital rape by the 1990s. English common law also had a great impact on many legal systems of the world through colonialism.

Kersti Yllö states in the prologue of Understanding Marital Rape In a Global Context, "In some cultures, consent is not even something that an individual wife can give. The families that arranged the marriage guarantee her permanent consent." Control over a wife's sexuality was only a part of the greater control that men had in all other areas concerning her. A husband's control over his wife's body could also be seen in the way adultery between a wife and another man was constructed; for example in 1707, English Lord Chief Justice John Holt described the act of a man having sexual relations with another man's wife as "the highest invasion of property". For this reason, in many cultures there was a conflation between the crimes of rape and adultery, since both were seen and understood as a violation of the rights of the husband. Spousal rape was considered a property crime against a husband, not against a woman's right to self-determination.

The property to be withheld in a female was her virginity; this was the commodity. Following this line of logic, a woman was (and still is in many cultures across the globe) first the property of her father, then, upon marriage, the property of her husband. Therefore, a man could not be prosecuted for raping his own wife because she was his possession. However, if another man raped someone's wife, this was essentially stealing property (a women's sexuality). In English customs, "bride capture" (a man claiming a woman through rape) was thought to be stealing a father's property by raping his daughter. Therefore, rape laws were created to "protect the property interests men had in their women, not to protect women themselves".

In some cultures, marriage is arranged for the purpose of creating access to procreation. In these situations, the parties do not necessarily consent to marriage (in the case of forced marriage). Following this logic, if consent is not part of marriage, then it is not necessary for intercourse. The autonomy of the wife is also often compromised in cultures where bride price is paid. Under customary law in certain parts of Africa, forced sex in marriage was not prohibited, although some specific circumstances, such as during advanced pregnancy, immediately after childbirth, during menstruation, or during mourning for a deceased close relative, were recognized as giving the wife the right to refuse sex.

Rape has been, until recent decades, understood as a crime against honor and reputation – not only in domestic legislation, but also in international law; for example according to the Article 27 of the Fourth Geneva Convention, "Women shall be especially protected against any attack on their honour, in particular against rape, enforced prostitution, or any form of indecent assault". It was not until the 1990s that the International Criminal Court statute recognized crimes of sexual violence as violent crimes against the person; "Not until the last half century was rape understood to be an offense against the woman, against her dignity, instead of against her family's or her husband's honor".

== Legal aspect ==
Historically, many cultures have had a concept of spouses' conjugal rights to sexual intercourse with each other. This can be seen in English common law, in force in Anglo America and the British Commonwealth, where the very concept of marital rape was treated as an impossibility. This was illustrated most vividly by Sir Matthew Hale (1609–1676), in his legal treatise Historia Placitorum Coronæ or History of the Pleas of the Crown (posthumously, 1736) where he wrote that "The husband cannot be guilty of a rape committed by himself upon his lawful wife, for by their mutual consent and contract the wife hath given up herself in this kind unto her husband, which she cannot retract."

=== Formalization of the marital rape exemption in law ===
==== Common law and the United Kingdom ====
Sir Matthew Hale's statement in History of the Pleas of the Crown did not cite a legal precedent for it, though it relied on earlier standards. In a case of Lord Audley's (1593–1631), for instance, Hale cite's the jurist Bracton (c. 1210 – c. 1268) support of this rule, said to have derived from laws of King Æthelstan (r. 927–939) where upon the law holds that even "were the party of no chaste life, but a whore, yet there may be ravishment: but it is a good plea to say she was his concubine". A lawful marriage legitimizes the conjugal act itself, so "marital rape" is a contradiction in terms. While a physical assault against a spouse may be charged, such is distinct from the delegitimization of conjugal union itself as rape. Marriage then should not be defined as an "exemption" to rape but as "contradictory" to it. Marriage created conjugal rights between spouses, and marriage could not be annulled except by a private act of Parliament—it therefore follows that a spouse could not revoke conjugal rights from the marriage, and therefore there could be no rape between spouses. The principle was repeated in East's Treatise of the Pleas of the Crown in 1803 and in Archbold's Pleading and Evidence in Criminal Cases in 1822. The principle was framed as an exemption to the law of rape in an English courtroom in R v Clarence, but it was not overturned until 1991 by the House of Lords in the case of R v R in 1991, where it was described as an anachronistic and offensive legal fiction.

=== Feminist critique in the 19th century ===
From the beginnings of the 19th century feminist movement, activists challenged the presumed right of men to engage in forced or coerced sex with their wives. In the United States, "the nineteenth-century woman's rights movement fought against a husband's right to control marital intercourse in a campaign that was remarkably developed, prolific, and insistent, given nineteenth-century taboos against the public mention of sex or sexuality." Suffragists including Elizabeth Cady Stanton and Lucy Stone "singled out a woman's right to control marital intercourse as the core component of equality."

Nineteenth century feminist demands centered on the right of women to control their bodies and fertility, positioned consent in marital sexual relations as an alternative to contraception and abortion (which many opposed), and also embraced eugenic concerns about excessive procreation. British liberal feminists John Stuart Mill and Harriet Taylor attacked marital rape as a gross double standard in law and as central to the subordination of women.

Advocates of the Free Love Movement, including early anarcha-feminists such as Voltairine de Cleyre and Emma Goldman, as well as Victoria Woodhull, Thomas Low Nichols, and Mary Gove Nichols, joined a critique of marital rape to advocate women's autonomy and sexual pleasure. Moses Harman, a Kansas-based publisher and advocate for women's rights, was jailed twice under the Comstock laws for publishing articles (by a woman who was victimized and a doctor who treated marital rape survivors) decrying marital rape. De Cleyre defended Harman in a well-known article, Sex Slavery (essay). She refused to draw any distinction between rape outside of and within marriage: "And that is rape, where a man forces himself sexually upon a woman whether he is licensed by the marriage law to do it or not."

British philosopher and writer Bertrand Russell in his book Marriage and Morals (1929) deplored the situation of married women. He wrote "Marriage is for woman the commonest mode of livelihood, and the total amount of undesired sex endured by women is probably greater in marriage than in prostitution."

=== 20th- and 21st-century criminalization ===
The marital rape exemption or defence became more widely viewed as inconsistent with the developing concepts of human rights and equality. The first country which criminalized the marital rape in 1922 was Soviet Union (i. e. the penal code made no longer the distinction between violent sex within marriage and outside the marriage), one decade later Poland in 1932. After World War II, many members of the Communist Bloc followed the Soviet example, e. g. Czechoslovakia in 1950.

Under the influence of European countries in which marital rape was already illegal (Soviet Union, etc.), feminists in other countries worked systematically since the 1960s to overturn the marital rape exemption and criminalize marital rape. Increasing criminalization of spousal rape is part of a worldwide reclassification of sexual crimes "from offenses against morality, the family, good customs, honor, or chastity ... to offenses against liberty, self-determination, or physical integrity." In December 1993, the United Nations High Commissioner for Human Rights published the Declaration on the Elimination of Violence Against Women. This establishes marital rape as a human rights violation.

The importance of the right to self sexual determination of women is increasingly being recognized as crucial to women's rights. In 2012, High Commissioner for Human Rights Navi Pillay stated that:

"Violations of women's human rights are often linked to their sexuality and reproductive role. (...) In many countries, married women may not refuse to have sexual relations with their husbands, and often have no say in whether they use contraception. (...) Ensuring that women have full autonomy over their bodies is the first crucial step towards achieving substantive equality between women and men. Personal issues—such as when, how and with whom they choose to have sex, and when, how and with whom they choose to have children—are at the heart of living a life in dignity."

Despite these trends and international moves, criminalization has not occurred in all UN member States. Determining the criminal status of marital rape may be challenging, because, while some countries explicitly criminalize the act (by stipulating in their rape laws that marriage is not a defense to a charge of rape; or by creating a specific crime of 'marital rape'; or, otherwise, by having statutory provisions that expressly state that a spouse can be charged with the rape of their other spouse) and other countries explicitly exempt spouses (by defining rape as forced sexual intercourse outside of marriage; or forced sexual intercourse with a woman not the perpetrator's wife; or by providing in their rape provisions that marriage is a defense to a charge of rape), in many countries the ordinary rape laws are silent on the issue (that is, they do not address the issue one way or another)—in such cases, in order to determine whether marital rape is covered by the ordinary rape laws it must be analyzed whether there are judicial decisions in this respect; and former definitions of the law are also important (for instance whether there was previously a statutory exemption that was removed by legislators for the purpose of implicitly including marital rape).

In 2006, the UN Secretary-General's in-depth study on all forms of violence against women stated that:

"Marital rape may be prosecuted in at least 104 States. Of these, 32 have made marital rape a specific criminal offence, while the remaining 74 do not exempt marital rape from general rape provisions. Marital rape is not a prosecutable offence in at least 53 States. Four States criminalize marital rape only when the spouses are judicially separated. Four States are considering legislation that would allow marital rape to be prosecuted."

In 2011, the UN Women report Progress of the World's Women: In Pursuit of Justice stated that:

"By April 2011, at least 52 States had explicitly outlawed marital rape in their criminal code".

Traditionally, rape was a criminal offense that could only be committed outside marriage, and courts did not apply the rape statutes to acts of forced sex between spouses. With changing social views, and international condemnation of sexual violence in marriage, courts have started to apply the rape laws in marriage. The current applicability in many countries of rape laws to spouses is currently unclear, since in many countries the laws have not been recently tested in court. In some countries, notably jurisdictions which have inherited the 1860 Indian Penal Code (such as Singapore, India, Bangladesh, Sri Lanka, Burma) and some countries in the Commonwealth Caribbean region, the laws explicitly exempt spouses from prosecution (for instance, under the 1860 Indian Penal Code, which has also been inherited by other countries in the region, the law on rape states that "Sexual intercourse by a man with his own wife is not rape").

An example of a country where the rape law explicitly excludes a husband as a possible perpetrator is Ethiopia; its rape law states: "Article 620 – Rape: Whoever compels a woman to submit to sexual intercourse outside wedlock, whether by the use of violence or grave intimidation, or after having rendered her unconscious or incapable of resistance, is punishable with rigorous imprisonment from five years to fifteen years". Another example is South Sudan, where the law states: "Sexual intercourse by a married couple is not rape, within the meaning of this section". (Art 247). Conversely, an example of country where the rape law explicitly criminalizes marital rape is Namibia – The Combating of Rape Act (No. 8 of 2000) states that: "No marriage or other relationship shall constitute a defence to a charge of rape under this Act". An example of a jurisdiction where marital rape is a distinct criminal offense is Bhutan where 'Marital rape' is defined by Article 199 which reads: "A defendant shall be guilty of marital rape, if the defendant engages in sexual intercourse with one's own spouse without consent or against the will of the other spouse".

By 1986, in Europe, there was international pressure to criminalize marital rape: the European Parliament's Resolution on Violence Against Women of 1986 called for its criminalization. This was reiterated by the Recommendation Rec(2002)5 of the Committee of Ministers to member states on the protection of women against violence. (see para 35) This recommendation provided detailed guidelines on how legislation regarding domestic violence, rape, and other forms of violence against women should operate. It also provided a definition of violence against women, and gave a list of non-exhaustive examples, including marital rape (see section "Definition" para 1). Although the approach on the issue of violence against women has varied significantly among European countries, the traditional view that acts of violence against a woman are crimes against honor and morality, and not against the self-determination of the woman, was still prevalent in the 1990s in many countries. The above recommendation stated that member states must "ensure that criminal law provides that any act of violence against a person, in particular physical or sexual violence, constitutes a violation of that person's physical, psychological and/or sexual freedom and integrity, and not solely a violation of morality, honour or decency" (para 34).

The approach regarding sexual and other forms of violence against women in specific European countries did not necessarily mirror women's rights in other areas of life (such as public or political life) in those countries: in fact some countries otherwise known for advanced women's rights, such as Finland and Denmark, have received strong criticism for their policies in this area. A 2008 report produced by Amnesty International, described Danish laws on sexual violence as "inconsistent with international human rights standards", which has led to Denmark eventually reforming its sexual offenses legislation in 2013. (Until 2013, in Denmark "the Penal Code reduce[d] the level of penalty or provide[d] for exclusion of punishment altogether for rape and sexual violence within marriage in certain instances [...] and if the perpetrator enter[ed] into or continu[ed] a marriage with his victim the punishment for rape c[ould] be reduced or remitted").

Cultural and religious values which support female subordination and inequality are considered important in dealing with the issue of sexual violence against women; but there have been calls for analyses of cultural gender norms which tolerate violence against women to not be based on stereotypes; Mala Htun and S. Laurel Weldon write "gender policy is not one issue but many" and "When [...] Latin American countries are quicker to adopt policies addressing violence against women than the Nordic countries, one at least ought to consider the possibility that fresh ways of grouping states would further the study of gender politics." The causes of the toleration – in law or in practice – of sexual violence inside marriage are complex; lack of understanding of the concept of consent and coercion due to lack of sexual education and public discussion about sexuality are often cited as causes of sexual abuse in general; but there has been criticism towards the idea that sex education about consent, in and of itself, is sufficient.

The countries which choose to ratify the Council of Europe Convention on preventing and combating violence against women and domestic violence, the first legally binding instrument in Europe in the field of violence against women, are bound by its provisions to ensure that non-consensual sexual acts committed against a spouse or partner are illegal. The convention came into force in August 2014. In its explanatory report (para 219) it acknowledges the long tradition of toleration, de jure or de facto, of marital rape and domestic violence:

"A large number of the offences established in accordance with this Convention are offences typically committed by family members, intimate partners or others in the immediate social environment of the victim. There are many examples from past practice in Council of Europe member states that show that exceptions to the prosecution of such cases were made, either in law or in practice, if victim and perpetrator were, for example, married to each other or had been in a relationship. The most prominent example is rape within marriage, which for a long time had not been recognised as rape because of the relationship between victim and perpetrator."

==== Legal changes ====
Countries which were early to criminalize marital rape include the Soviet Union (1922), Poland (1932), Czechoslovakia (1950), some other members of the Communist Bloc, Sweden (1965), and Norway (1971). Slovenia, then a republic within federal Yugoslavia, criminalized marital rape in 1977. The Israeli Supreme Court affirmed that marital rape is a crime in a 1980 decision, citing law based on the Talmud (at least 6th century). Criminalization in Australia began with the state of New South Wales in 1981, followed by all other states from 1985 to 1992. Several formerly British-ruled countries followed suit: Canada (1983), New Zealand (1985), and Ireland (1990).

Marital rape was criminalized in Austria in 1989 (and in 2004 it became a state offense meaning it can be prosecuted by the state even in the absence of a complaint from the spouse, with procedures being similar to stranger rape). In Switzerland marital rape became a crime in 1992 (and became a state offense in 2004). In Spain, the Supreme Court ruled in 1992 that sex within marriage must be consensual and that sexuality in marriage must be understood in light of the principle of the freedom to make one's own decisions with respect to sexual activity; in doing so it upheld the conviction of a man who had been found guilty of raping his wife by a lower court.

In Europe, Finland outlawed marital rape in 1994. The case of domestic violence in Finland has been the subject of interest and discussion, because Finland is otherwise considered a country where women have very advanced rights in regard to public life and participation in the public sphere (jobs, opportunities, etc.). The country has been made the object of international criticism in regard to its approach towards violence against women. A 2010 Eurobarometer survey on European attitudes on violence against women showed that victim blaming attitudes are much more common in Finland than in other countries: 74% of Finns blamed "the provocative behaviour of women" for violence against women, much higher than in other countries (for instance many countries that are popularly believed to be among the most patriarchal of Europe were significantly less likely to agree with that assertion: 33% in Spain, 46% in Ireland, 47% in Italy).

Belgium was early to criminalize marital rape. In 1979, the Brussels Court of Appeal recognized marital rape and found that a husband who used serious violence to coerce his wife into having sex against her wishes was guilty of the criminal offense of rape. The logic of the court was that, although the husband did have a 'right' to sex with his wife, he could not use violence to claim it, as Belgian laws did not allow people to obtain their rights by violence. In 1989 laws were amended, the definition of rape was broadened, and marital rape began to be treated the same as other forms of rape.

In Ireland, the Criminal Law (Rape) Act, 1981 defined rape as "unlawful sexual intercourse" without consent; an attempt to explicitly include spouses within the definition was rejected by the Fianna Fáil government. Seán Doherty, the Minister for Justice, suggested that the courts might allow a charge of rape in some cases, and that various assault charges might be prosecuted in others. A 1987 discussion paper by the Law Reform Commission stated, "In the absence of Irish decisions on the topic, the present law cannot be stated with any great degree of confidence. It would appear, however, that to the extent that the marital rape exemption exists, it is confined to circumstances where the spouses are cohabiting and there are no separation proceedings in being, or even, perhaps, in contemplation." The paper's call to abolish any marital exemption was "on the whole, generally welcomed, although some misgivings were expressed as to whether it might not lead to fabricated complaints and unwarranted intrusions in the marital relationship." The Criminal Law (Rape) (Amendment) Act, 1990 removed the word "unlawful" from the 1981 definition of rape, and abolished "any rule of law by virtue of which a husband cannot be guilty of the rape of his wife". The first two convictions were in 2006 (upon retrial) and 2016.

In France, in 1990, following a case where a man had tortured and raped his wife, the Court of Cassation authorized prosecution of spouses for rape or sexual assault. In 1992 the Court convicted a man of the rape of his wife, stating that the presumption that spouses have consented to sexual acts that occur within marriage is only valid when the contrary is not proven. In 1994, Law 94-89 criminalized marital rape; a second law, passed 4 April 2006, makes rape by a partner (including in unmarried relationships, marriages, and civil unions) an aggravating circumstance in prosecuting rape.

Germany outlawed spousal rape in 1997, which is later than other developed countries. Female ministers and women's rights activists lobbied for this law for over 25 years. Before 1997, the definition of rape was: "Whoever compels a woman to have extramarital intercourse with him, or with a third person, by force or the threat of present danger to life or limb, shall be punished by not less than two years’ imprisonment". In 1997 there were changes to the rape law, broadening the definition, making it gender-neutral, and removing the marital exemption. Before, marital rape could only be prosecuted as "Causing bodily harm" (Section 223 of the German Criminal Code), "Insult" (Section 185 of the German Criminal Code) and "Using threats or force to cause a person to do, suffer or omit an act" (Nötigung, Section 240 of the German Criminal Code) which carried lower sentences and were rarely prosecuted.

Before a new Criminal Code came into force in 2003, the law on rape in Bosnia and Herzegovina also contained a statutory exemption, and read: "Whoever coerces a female not his wife into sexual intercourse by force or threat of imminent attack upon her life or body or the life or body of a person close to her, shall be sentenced to a prison term of one to ten years". In Portugal also, before 1982, there was a statutory exemption.

Marital rape was criminalized in Serbia in 2002; before that date rape was legally defined as forced sexual intercourse outside of marriage. The same was true in Hungary until 1997.

In 1994, in Judgment no. 223/94 V, 1994, the Court of Appeal of Luxembourg confirmed the applicability of the provisions of the Criminal Code regarding rape to marital rape.

Marital rape was made illegal in the Netherlands in 1991. The legislative changes provided a new definition for rape in 1991, which removed the marital exemption, and also made the crime gender-neutral; before 1991 the legal definition of rape was a man forcing, by violence or threat of thereof, a woman to engage in sexual intercourse outside of marriage.

In Italy the law on rape, violenza carnale ('carnal violence', as it was termed) did not contain a statutory exemption, but was, as elsewhere, understood as inapplicable in the context of marriage. Although Italy has a reputation of a male dominated traditional society, it was quite early to accept that the rape law covers forced sex in marriage too: in 1976 in Sentenza n. 12857 del 1976, the Supreme Court ruled that "the spouse who compels the other spouse to carnal knowledge by violence or threats commits the crime of carnal violence" ("commette il delitto di violenza carnale il coniuge che costringa con violenza o minaccia l’altro coniuge a congiunzione carnale").

Cyprus criminalized marital rape in 1994. Marital rape was made illegal in North Macedonia in 1996. In Croatia marital rape was criminalized in 1998.

In 2006, Greece enacted Law 3500/2006, entitled "For combating domestic violence", which punishes marital rape. It entered into force on 24 October 2006. This legislation also prohibits numerous other forms of violence within marriage and cohabiting relations, and various other forms of abuse of women.

Liechtenstein made marital rape illegal in 2001.

Marital rape illegal Marital rape legal 'Marital rape' legal, but forced marital sex still punishable Legal status unclear

In South America, Colombia criminalized marital rape in 1996, and Chile criminalized it in 1999.

Thailand outlawed marital rape in 2007. The new reforms were enacted amid strong controversy and were opposed by many. One opponent of the law was legal scholar Taweekiet Meenakanit who voiced his opposition to the legal reforms. He also opposed the making of rape a gender neutral offense. Meenakanit claimed that allowing a husband to file a rape charge against his wife is "abnormal logic" and that wives would refuse to divorce or put their husband in jail since many Thai wives are dependent on their husbands.

Papua New Guinea criminalized marital rape in 2003. Namibia outlawed marital rape in 2000.

Section 375 of the Indian Penal Code (IPC) considers the forced sex in marriages as a crime only when the wife is below age 15. Thus, marital rape is not a criminal offense under the IPC. Marital rape victims have to take recourse to the Protection of Women from Domestic Violence Act 2005 (PWDVA). The PWDVA, which came into force in 2006, outlaws marital rape. However, it offers only a civil remedy for the offence. In February 2022, Smriti Irani (Minister for Women and Child Development) told parliament that “The Government of India has initiated the process for comprehensive amendments to criminal laws in consultation" in response to questions on marital rape, which assures some provisions will be made on criminalizing marital rape.

Recent countries to criminalize marital rape include Zimbabwe (2001), Turkey (2005), Cambodia (2005), Liberia (2006), Nepal (2006), Mauritius (2007), Ghana (2007), Malaysia (2007), Thailand (2007), Rwanda (2009), Suriname (2009), Nicaragua (2012), Sierra Leone (2012), South Korea (2013), Bolivia (2013), Samoa (2013), Tonga (1999/2013). Human rights observers have criticized a variety of countries for failing to effectively prosecute marital rape once it has been criminalized. South Africa, which criminalized in 1993, saw its first conviction for marital rape in 2012.

==== United States ====
The traditional definition of rape in the United States is the forced sexual intercourse by a male with a "female not his wife", making it clear that the statutes did not apply to married couples. The 1962 Model Penal Code repeated the marital rape exemption, stating:

A male who has sexual intercourse with a female not his wife is guilty of rape if: ....

Reforms of marital rape laws in the United States began in the mid-1970s with the criminalization of marital rape. South Dakota criminalized marital rape in 1975, making it the first U.S. state to do so. Two years later, however, the South Dakota legislature decriminalized marital rape. After this change, marital rape would not be recriminalized in South Dakota until 1990.

The earlier laws of the 1970s often required the husband and wife to no longer be living together for marital rape charges to be brought. The case in the United States that first challenged this cohabitation clause was Oregon v. Rideout in 1978. Although the husband was acquitted of raping his wife, it spurred the movement towards reform. By 1993 marital rape was a crime in all 50 states. Still, in the 1990s, most states continued to differentiate between the way marital rape and non-marital rape was viewed and treated. The laws have continued to change and evolve, with most states reforming their laws in the 21st century. But there are still states, like South Carolina, where marital and non-marital rape are treated quite differently under the law.

In the 1990s, most states differentiated between the way marital rape and non-marital rape were treated. These differences were visible through shorter penalties, taking into account whether or not violence was used, and allowing for shorter reporting periods. The laws have continued to change and evolve, with most states reforming their legislation in the 21st century, in order to bring marital rape laws in line with non-marital rape, but even today there remain differences in some states. With the removal, in 2005, of the requirement of a higher level of violence from the law of Tennessee, which now allows for marital rape in Tennessee to be treated like any other type of rape, South Carolina remains the only US state with a law requiring excessive force/violence (the force or violence used or threatened must be of a "high and aggravated nature").

In most states the criminalization has occurred by the removal of the exemptions from the general rape law by legislation, or by courts striking down such exemptions as unconstitutional. Some states have created a distinct crime of spousal rape. California, for example, has separate criminal offenses for rape (Article 261) and for spousal rape (Article 262).

==== England and Wales ====
===== Background =====
Although the issue of marital rape was highlighted by feminists in the 19th century, and was also deplored by thinkers such as John Stuart Mill and Bertrand Russell (see above section 'Feminist critique in the 19th century'), it was not until the 1970s that this issue was raised at a political level. The late 1970s also saw the enactment of Sexual Offences (Amendment) Act 1976, which provided the first statutory definition of rape (prior to this rape was defined by the common law). The Criminal Law Revision Committee in their 1984 Report on Sexual Offences rejected the idea that the offense of rape should be extended to marital relations; writing the following:

"The majority of us ... believe that rape cannot be considered in the abstract as merely 'sexual intercourse without consent'. The circumstances of rape may be peculiarly grave. This feature is not present in the case of a husband and wife cohabiting with each other when an act of sexual intercourse occurs without the wife's consent. They may well have had sexual intercourse regularly before the act in question and, because a sexual relationship may involve a degree of compromise, she may sometimes have agreed only with some reluctance to such intercourse. Should he go further and force her to have sexual intercourse without her consent, this may evidence a failure of the marital relationship. But it is far from being the 'unique' and 'grave' offence described earlier. Where the husband goes so far as to cause injury, there are available a number of offences against the person with which he may be charged, but the gravamen of the husband's conduct is the injury he has caused not the sexual intercourse he has forced."

The committee also expressed more general views on domestic violence arguing that "Violence occurs in some marriages but the wives do not always wish the marital tie to be severed" and reiterated the point that domestic incidents without physical injury would generally be outside the scope of the law: "Some of us consider that the criminal law should keep out of marital relationships between cohabiting partners—especially the marriage bed—except where injury arises, when there are other offences which can be charged."

Five years later, in Scotland, the High Court of Justiciary took a different view, abolishing marital immunity, in S. v. H.M. Advocate, 1989. The same happened in England and Wales in 1991, in R v R (see below). Very soon after this, in Australia, at the end of 1991, in R v L, the High Court of Australia ruled the same, ruling that if the common law exemption had ever been part of the Australian law, it no longer was (by that time most Australian states and territories had already abolished their exemptions by statutory law).

===== Ending the exemption =====
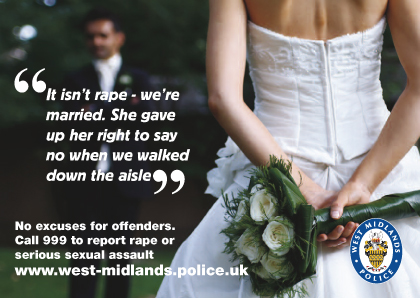
2012 West Midlands Police poster against sexual violence, stating marriage is 'no excuse'

The marital rape exemption was first referred to in 1736 in Matthew Hale's History of the Pleas of the Crown (see above). It was abolished in England and Wales in 1991 by the Appellate Committee of the House of Lords, in the case of R v R, which was the first occasion where the marital rights exemption had been appealed as far as the House of Lords, and it followed the trio of cases since 1988 where the marital rights exemption was held to exist. The leading judgment, unanimously approved, was given by Lord Keith of Kinkel. He stated that the contortions being performed in the lower courts in order to avoid applying the marital rights exemption were indicative of the absurdity of the rule, and held, agreeing with earlier judgments in Scotland and in the Court of Appeal in R v R, that "the fiction of implied consent has no useful purpose to serve today in the law of rape" and that the marital rights exemption was a "common law fiction" which had never been a true rule of English law. R's appeal was accordingly dismissed, and he was convicted of the rape of his wife.

The first attempted prosecution of a husband for the rape of his wife was R v Clarke (1949). Rather than try to argue directly against Hale's logic, the court held that consent in this instance had been revoked by an order of the court for non-cohabitation. It was the first of a number of cases in which the courts found reasons not to apply the exemption, notably R v O'Brien (1974) (the obtaining of decree nisi), R v Steele (1976) (an undertaking by the husband to the court not to molest the wife) and R v Roberts (1986) (the existence of a formal separation agreement).

There are at least four recorded instances of a husband successfully relying on the exemption in England and Wales. The first was R v Miller (1954), where it was held that the wife had not legally revoked her consent despite having presented a divorce petition. R v Kowalski (1988) was followed by R v Sharples (1990), and R v J (1991), a judgment made after the first instance decision of the Crown Court in R v R but before the decision of the House of Lords that was to abolish the exemption. In Miller, Kowalski and R v J the husbands were instead convicted of assault. The R v Kowalski case involved, among other acts, an instance of non-consensual oral sex. For this, the husband was convicted of indecent assault, as the court ruled that his wife's "implied consent" by virtue of marriage extended only to vaginal intercourse, not to other acts such as fellatio. (At that time the offense of 'rape' dealt only with vaginal intercourse.) In R v Sharples (1990) it was alleged that the husband had raped his wife in 1989. Despite the fact that the wife had obtained a family protection order before the alleged rape, the judge refused to accept that rape could legally occur, concluding that the family protection order had not removed the wife's implied consent, ruling that: "it cannot be inferred that by obtaining the order in these terms the wife had withdrawn her consent to sexual intercourse".

===== Aftermath =====
By 1991, when the exemption was removed, the Law Commission in its Working Paper of 1990 was already supporting the abolition of the exemption, a view reiterated in their Final Report that was published in 1992; and international moves in this direction were by now common. Therefore, the result of the R v R case was welcomed. But, while the removal of the exemption itself was not controversial, the way through which this was done was; since the change was not made through usual statutory modification. The cases of SW v UK and CR v UK arose in response to R v R; in which the applicants (convicted of rape and attempted rape of the wives) appealed to the European Court of Human Rights arguing that their convictions were a retrospective application of the law in breach of Article 7 of the European Convention on Human Rights. They claimed that at the time of the rape there was a common law exemption in force, therefore their convictions were post facto. Their case was not successful, with their arguments being rejected by the European Court of Human Rights, which ruled that the criminalization of marital rape had become a reasonably foreseeable development of the criminal law in the light of the evolution of social norms; and that the Article 7 does not prohibit the gradual judicial evolution of the interpretation of an offense, provided the result is consistent with the essence of the offense and that it could be reasonably foreseen.

A new definition of the offense of 'rape' was created in 1994 by the section 142 of the Criminal Justice and Public Order Act 1994, providing a broader definition that included anal sex; and an even broader definition was created by the Sexual Offences Act 2003, including oral sex. The law on rape does not—and did not ever since the removal of the marital exemption in 1991—provide for any different punishment based on the relation between parties. However, in 1993, in R v W 1993 14 Cr App R (S) 256, the court ruled: "It should not be thought a different and lower scale automatically attaches to the rape of a wife by her husband. All will depend upon the circumstances of the case. Where the parties are cohabiting and the husband insisted upon intercourse against his wife's will but without violence or threats this may reduce sentence. Where the conduct is gross and involves threats or violence the relationship will be of little significance."

==== Northern Ireland ====
At the time of R v R (see "England and Wales" above), rape in Northern Ireland was a crime at common law. Northern Ireland common law is similar to that of England and Wales, and partially derives from the same sources; so any (alleged) exemption from its rape law was also removed by R v R. In March 2000, a Belfast man was convicted for raping his wife, in the first case of its kind in Northern Ireland.

Until 28 July 2003, rape in Northern Ireland remained solely an offense at common law that could only be committed by a man against a woman only as vaginal intercourse. Between 28 July 2003 and 2 February 2009 rape was defined by the Criminal Justice (Northern Ireland) Order 2003 as "any act of non-consensual intercourse by a man with a person", but the common law offense continued to exist, and oral sex remained excluded. On 2 February 2009 the Sexual Offences (Northern Ireland) Order 2008 came into force, abolishing the common law offense of rape, and providing a definition of rape that is similar to that of the Sexual Offences Act 2003 of England and Wales. The Public Prosecution Service for Northern Ireland has the same policy for marital rape as for other forms of rape; it states in its Policy for Prosecuting Cases of Rape document that: "The Policy applies to all types of rape, including marital and relationship rape, acquaintance and stranger rape, both against male and female victims".

==== Australia ====
In Australia, the immunity for marital rape was removed in all states and territories, either by statute or judicial decision, between late 1970s and early 1990s. Previously, the exemption of marital rape was based on the English common law offense of rape, being generally understood as "carnal knowledge", outside of marriage, of a female against her will. The common law definition of rape continued to apply in some states, while others codified the definition, which in each case included a marital exemption. In Queensland, for example, the provision read: "Any person who has carnal knowledge of a woman or girl, not his wife, without her consent, or with her consent, if the consent is obtained by force, or by means of threats or intimidation of any kind, or by fear of bodily harm, or by means of false and fraudulent representations as to the nature of the act, or, in the case of a married woman, by personating her husband, is guilty of a crime, which is called rape."

The first Australian state to deal with marital rape was South Australia, under the progressive initiatives of Premier Don Dunstan, which in 1976 partially removed the exemption. Section 73 of the Criminal Law Consolidation Act Amendment Act 1976 (SA) read: "No person shall, by reason only of the fact that he is married to some other person, be presumed to have consented to sexual intercourse with that other person". Nevertheless, the laws did not go as far as equating marital with non-marital rape; the law required violence or other aggravating circumstances, in order for an act of marital intercourse to be rape.

The first Australian jurisdiction to completely remove the marital exemption was New South Wales in 1981. Western Australia, Victoria, and ACT did the same in 1985; and Tasmania in 1987. Discussions of criminalization of marital rape were already taking place in Queensland in the late 1970s, but it was not until 1989 that the exemption was removed and the Northern Territory did the same in 1994. In 1991, in R v L, the High Court of Australia ruled that "if it was ever the common law that by marriage a wife gave irrevocable consent to sexual intercourse by her husband, it is no longer the common law." The case led to South Australia changing its law in 1992.

==== India and Pakistan ====
In India and Pakistan there are no law provisions related to the marital rape but they are being demanded by the commission to enact laws to bring it in the criminal jurisdiction. In India, the controversies persist in the socio-legal discourse surrounding the issue of marital rape. Moreover, as per the new penal code of India, Bharatiya Nyaya Sanhita, 2023, which replaced the colonial-era Indian Penal Code of 1860, the husband is formally exempted from the forced sexual intercourse being classified as the rape if the wife is adult (at least 18) in the exception 2 of the section 63, that criminalises the rape. However, Pakistan, through The Protection of Women (Criminal Laws Amendment) Act, 2006, removed the phrase "not his wife" from the section 365 of its Penal Code, that define the rape. in aftermath of this legislation, the forced sexual intercourse by the husband is considered as the rape same as the non-marital rape on papers in Pakistan. Following this, in November 2022, the Additional Session Judge (South) Ashraf Hussain Khowaja persecuted a husband with three years of rigorous punishment and a fine of 30,000 PKR under charges of rape when his wife had filed a case against him in the July, 2022. These debates not only ignore the pain, trauma and suffering women face because of sexual violence within an unequal marriage relationship but also overlook the fact that women are powerless and vulnerable in such a patriarchal setup.

== Marriage after rape ==
In a variety of cultures, marriage after a rape of an unmarried woman has been treated historically as a "resolution" to the rape, that is, a "reparatory marriage". In some countries, the mere offer to marry the person one has raped is sufficient to exonerate the perpetrator from criminal prosecution. Although laws that exonerate the perpetrator if he marries his victim after the rape are often associated with the Middle East, such laws were very common around the world until the second half of the 20th century. For instance, as late as 1997, 14 Latin American countries had such laws; as of 2017, The New Humanitarian said there were only a "few" Latin American countries with such laws left.

Whether women were forced to marry their rapist, or the marriage was concluded before the violence began, many victims remain in chronically violent relationships. While there are many reasons for which victims of marital rape remain in their marriages, one important reason is that divorce may be hard to obtain and/or is stigmatized. Cross-culturally, one of the barriers that keep victims within their marriages is the shame and guilt they feel surrounding marital rape, or general taboos around sexuality. Lastly, some victims do not categorize their abuse as marital rape in order to minimize the violence they endure. This is used as a defense mechanism so they can continue to endure their abuse.

=== In the context of forced and child marriage ===
Forced marriage and child marriage are prevalent in many parts of the world, especially in parts of Asia and Africa. A forced marriage is a marriage where one or both participants are married without their freely given consent; while a child marriage is a marriage where one or both parties are younger than 18. These types of marriages are associated with a higher rate of domestic violence, including marital rape. These forms of marriage are most common in traditional societies which have no laws against sexual violence in marriage, and where it is also very difficult to leave a marriage. Incidents taking place in some of these countries (such as Yemen) have received international attention. The World Health Organization states, under the rubric "Customary forms of sexual violence", (pp. 156):

"Marriage is often used to legitimize a range of forms of sexual violence against women. The custom of marrying off young children, particularly girls, is found in many parts of the world. This practice – legal in many countries – is a form of sexual violence, since the children involved are unable to give or withhold their consent. The majority of them know little or nothing about sex before they are married."

One type of forced marriages occurs in Guatemala (called robadas) and Mexico (called rapto). Robadas refers to "...abductions, in which women are 'taken' during the period of courtship, sometimes semivoluntarily but other times by force, by a suitor who wants to start a marital relationship with them". Rapto refers to "...an abduction for sexual or erotic purposes or marriage". Following the abduction, marriage is often encouraged to maintain the family honor.

In these types of forced marriages, the marital union begins with the man's intense sense of control over the woman, combined with the understanding that the wife is the possession of her husband. This foundation of marriage had direct implications for sexual violence within the marriage. In reference to the practice of robadas, Cecilia Menjívar writes, "...unions that start out from the violent act of a robada can continue to breed violence, abuse, and mistreatment in the union." In addition, women victims of robadas often face embarrassment and blame, despite the act usually being initiated by male perpetrators. Women are blamed for disobeying their parents or not resisting their abductor strong enough. This notion of blaming the woman also occurs in reference to rapto in rural Mexico. Silvie Bovarnick writes, "In many cases, men and women alike look for the fault of responsibility in women's behavior due to traditional conceptualisations of women as 'pillars of honour.'" Abduction and rape compromises a woman's moral integrity, and therefore her honor. Many of these women, who were given little choice in their marriage, are left to live with their abusers.

== Prevalence ==
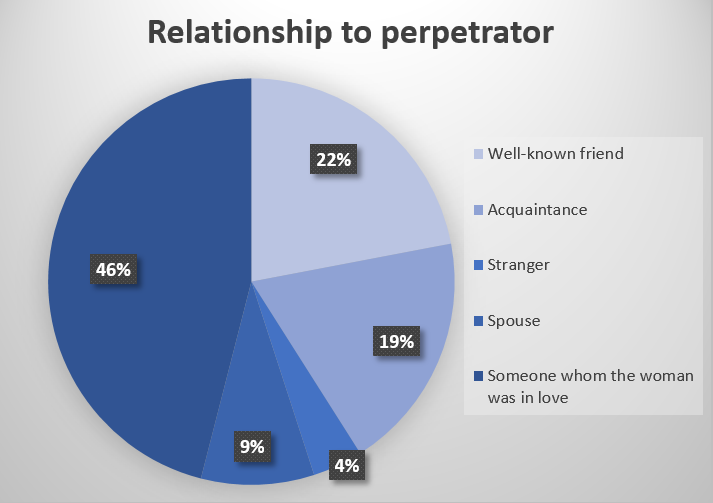
According to a study cited by Gary F. Kelly (2011), 9% of female rape victims were raped by their spouse.

The prevalence of marital rape is difficult to assess, especially outside the Western World. Discussing sexual matters in many cultures is taboo. One problem with studies on marital rape is that the Western concept of consent is not understood in many parts of the world. Because many societies operate on social norms which create a dual system of sexual morality—one for sexual intercourse that is marital which is seen as an obligation that cannot be refused, and extra-marital, which is seen as wrong (or illicit/illegal). Issues of consent are poorly understood, especially by young wives (which are often young girls who do not have a proper understanding of sexual rights). For instance in an interview in a study for the World Health Organization, a woman from Bangladesh who described being hit by her husband and forced to have sex said that: "I thought this is only natural. This is the way a husband behaves." Research has, nevertheless, associated specific regions with a very high level of violence, including sexual violence, against women by husbands/partners. An example of such a place is Ethiopia.

The prevalence of marital rape depends on the particularly legal, national, and cultural context. In 1999, the World Health Organization conducted a study on violence against women in Tajikistan, surveying 900 women above the age of 14 in three districts of the country and found that 47% of married women reported having been forced to have sex by their husband. In Turkey 35.6% of women have experienced marital rape sometimes and 16.3% often.

The earliest study in the Western World attempting to survey marital rape was an unpublished study by Joan Seites in the spring of 1975. Seites sent questionnaires to 40 rape-crisis centers from a list compiled by the Center for Women Policy Studies (Washington, DC). 16 Centers completed questionnaire for a response rate of 40%. Of the 3,709 reported calls dealing with rape and attempted rape received by the 16 centers, 12 calls dealt with marital rape (0.3%). Because rape-crisis centers did not always record the relationships of the callers, whether the 12 reported calls fully represent the number of married relationships cannot be certainly known.

In 1982 Diana E. H. Russell, a feminist writer and activist, conducted the seminal study on marital rape. Her study surveyed a total of 930 women from San Francisco, California (50% non-response rate, non-English speaking Asian women were specifically excluded as non-reliable respondents), of whom 644 were married, divorced, or who self-identified as having a husband although not married. Six of these women (1%) self-assessed that they had been raped by their husbands, ex-husband, or de facto husbands. The survey interviewers, however, classified 74 (12%) of these women as having been raped. Of the 286 non-married women in the sample, 228 (80%) were classified by the survey interviewers as having been raped. Russell found that when repeated instances of rape as classified by the survey interviewers, by husbands or ex-husbands, over the entire course of the marriage are included, these account for 38% of all rape instances, in comparison to the remaining 62% occurring in non-marital instances.

David Finkelhor and Kersti Yllö published a study in 1985 on marital rape that drew on a scientifically selected area probability sample from the metropolitan Boston area of 323 women who were either married or previously married who had a child living with them between the ages of six and fourteen. The study found that of the women who were married the instance of sexual relations through physical force or the threat thereof was 3%.

In 1994, Patricia Easteal, then Senior Criminologist at the Australian Institute of Criminology, published the results of survey on sexual assault in many settings. The respondents had all been victims of numerous forms of sexual assault. Of the victim sub-sample, 10.4% had been raped by husbands or de facto husbands, with a further 2.3% raped by estranged husbands/de factos.

In 2002 Basile published research intended to address the lack of a nationally probability sample to-date that measured intimate sexual coercion faced by married women. Data were collected in a 1997 national poll by a random telephone survey of 1,108 residents in the continental U.S. of persons 18 years old or older. The survey had a 50% response rate. Of the 1,108 respondents, the 506 men were excluded from any inquiry into unwanted sexual experiences, leaving 602 (54%) women respondents for the study. 398 (66%) women indicated no unwanted sexual relations (their marital status is not given), and 204 (34%) women responded as having engaged in unwanted sex after being subject to some level of sexual coercion; types of sexual coercion included receiving 'a gift', 'a nice dinner', 'a back rub', 'kissing', etc. through threatened harm and physical coercion. Of this group, a sub-sample of 120 (59%) were married, of which 9% responded as having been subject to physical force.

== Physical and psychological damage ==
Rape by a spouse, partner or ex-partner is more often associated with physical violence. A nine-nation study within the European Union found that current or ex-partners were the perpetrators of around 25% of all sexual assaults, and that violence was more common in assaults by ex-partners (50% of the time) and partners (40%) than in assaults by strangers or recent acquaintances (25%).

Attributing the effects of marital rape in research is problematic as it is nearly impossible to find a large enough sample of spouses to study who have experienced sexual violence but have not also been physically assaulted by their spouse. Marital rape can spread sexually transmitted infections and HIV, adversely affecting a victim's physical and psychological health. In sub-Saharan countries with very high prevalence rates of HIV, such as Lesotho, instances of multiple partnerships and marital rape exacerbate the spread of HIV.

While rape by a stranger is highly traumatic, it is typically a one-time event and is clearly understood as rape. In the case of rape by a spouse or long term sexual partner, the history of the relationship affects the victim's reactions. There is research showing that marital rape can be more emotionally and physically damaging than rape by a stranger. Marital rape may occur as part of an abusive relationship. Trauma from the rape adds to the effect of other abusive acts or abusive and demeaning talk. Furthermore, marital rape is rarely a one-time event, but a repeated if not frequent occurrence. The researchers Finkelhor and Yllö remarked in their 1985 metropolitan Boston area study that:

"When a woman is raped by a stranger, she has to live with a frightening memory. When she is raped by her husband, she has to live with the rapist".

== Relation to other forms of marital violence ==
The historical (and present day in jurisdictions where it still applies) immunity of husbands to have sexual relations with their wives without consent was not the only marital immunity in regard to abuse; immunity from the use of violence was (and still is in some countries) common—in the form of a husband's right to use "moderate chastisement" against a 'disobedient' wife. In the US, many states, especially Southern ones, maintained this immunity until the mid-19th century. For instance, in 1824, in Calvin Bradley v. the State, the Mississippi Supreme Court uphold this right of the husband; ruling as follows:

Family broils and dissentions cannot be investigated before the tribunals of the country, without casting a shade over the character of those who are unfortunately engaged in the controversy. To screen from public reproach those who may be thus unhappily situated, let the husband be permitted to exercise the right of moderate chastisement, in cases of great emergency, and use salutary restraints in every case of misbehaviour, without being subjected to vexatious prosecutions, resulting in the mutual discredit and shame of all parties concerned

Although by the late 19th century courts were unanimously agreeing that husbands no longer had the right to inflict "chastisement" on their wives, the public policy was set at ignoring incidents deemed not 'serious enough' for legal intervention. In 1874, the Supreme Court of North Carolina ruled:

We may assume that the old doctrine, that a husband had a right to whip his wife, provided he used a switch no larger than his thumb, is not law in North Carolina. Indeed, the Courts have advanced from that barbarism until they have reached the position, that the husband has no right to chastise his wife, under any circumstances.

But from motives of public policy, – in order to preserve the sanctity of the domestic circle, the Courts will not listen to trivial complaints.

If no permanent injury has been inflicted, nor malice, cruelty nor dangerous violence shown by the husband, it is better to draw the curtain, shut out the public gaze, and leave the parties to forget and forgive.

No general rule can be applied, but each case must depend upon the circumstances surrounding it.

Today, husbands continue to be immune from prosecution in case of certain forms of physical abuse against their wives in some countries. For instance, in Iraq husbands have a legal right to "punish" their wives. The criminal code states that there is no crime if an act is committed while exercising a legal right. Examples of legal rights include: "The punishment of a wife by her husband, the disciplining by parents and teachers of children under their authority within certain limits prescribed by law or by custom". In 2010, the United Arab Emirates's Supreme Court ruled that a man has the right to physically discipline his wife and children as long as he does not leave physical marks.

== Sustaining factors ==
=== Legal ===
Legally, governments have direct impact on the occurrence of marital rape. The state "…engages in the definition, monitoring, and sanctioning of appropriate behavior". This can play out in criminalizing or not criminalizing marital rape and therefore deeming what is appropriate. Catharine MacKinnon argues that rape laws in male dominated societies exist to regulate access to women from a male perspective, not to protect women's right to freely decide whether to engage in sexual intercourse or not. Even when state laws have criminalized marital rape, state institutions perpetuate it. For example, although marital rape has been criminalized throughout the United States, the original laws of the 1980s and 1990s treated marital rape differently from non-marital rape, and in some states this continues to be the case even today (see Marital rape (United States law)). As these laws exemplify, marital rape is seen as somehow less reprehensible than rape outside of marriage. Even when marital rape is prosecuted successfully, courts often pass shorter sentences – even if the law itself does not stipulate this – based on the view that sexual violation is less serious if it occurs within marriage. Following this same understanding, British courts often pass lower sentences to marital rape than to other cases of rape because it is believed that it causes less harm to the victim.

Police departments are another state institution that treats domestic violence differently than other forms of violence. Police often label domestic abuse calls as low priority, respond slower, and focus on what provoked the abuse rather than the violent actions of the perpetrator. Also, they often act as mediators in the situation because they may feel that domestic violence is a family matter and therefore not their business.

While government institutional influences are vast, marital rape is often sustained by cultural ideologies. According to Catharine MacKinnon and Andrea Dworkin, the issue of sexual violence, including within marriage, has not been a political spectrum issue – that is a left wing vs. right wing issue – but a general ubiquitous part of the culture, "The Left and the Right have consistently had different positions on rape; but neither has acknowledged rape from the point of view of the women who experienced it."

=== Culturally unrecognizable ===
For many cultures, ideas of marital rape seem often foreign imposed and contradict the belief that such matters should be dealt with privately rather than by the government. In other instances, notably in the country of India, members of the government have spoken publicly that marital rape cannot be recognized in their culture. The Indian Minister of State for Home Affairs, Haribhai Parthibhai Chaudhary, stated in April 2015, "The concept of marital rape, as understood internationally, cannot be suitably applied in the Indian context due to various factors, including levels of education, illiteracy, poverty, myriad social customs and values, religious beliefs, [and] the mindset of the society to treat the marriage as sacrament". For many other countries, the concept of marital rape is itself an oxymoron. Women in these cultures largely "share the cultural logic that marital rape is a contradiction in terms" while men simultaneously "see women's sexual consent in marriage as taken for granted" and therefore "reject the very concept of marital rape".

The act of imposing sexual intercourse against the will of the wife is often not identified as morally wrong, and so it is difficult to attempt to stop the practice, "Often, men who coerce a spouse into a sexual act believe their actions are legitimate because they are married to the woman." (WHO, pp. 149). This idea that sexual intercourse in marriage is 'legitimate' and so it cannot be illegal even when forced, is in some parts of the world fueled by the custom of bride price: its paying is seen as earning the man the right to sexual and reproductive control of his wife. UN Women recommended the abolition of giving bride price, and stated that: "Legislation should [...] State that a perpetrator of domestic violence, including marital rape, cannot use the fact that he paid bride price as a defense to a domestic violence charge. (pp. 25) "

Young women from various settings in South Asia explained in surveys that even if they felt discomfort and did not want to have sex, they accepted their husbands' wishes and submitted, fearing that otherwise they would be beaten. In many developing countries it is believed – by both men and women – that a husband is entitled to sex any time he demands it, and that if his wife refuses him, he has the right to use force. These women, most of them either illiterate or very poorly educated, are married at very young ages (in Bangladesh, for example, according to statistics from 2005, 45% of women then aged between 25 and 29 had been married by the age of 15), and depend on their husbands for their entire life. This situation leaves women with very little sexual autonomy. The notion that women are sexually autonomous and therefore have the ability to give or retract consent is not universally understood. Gabriella Torres writes, "The degree to which women and men view themselves as unique social beings with a full ability to make choices and suffer consequences varies by culture." As a result, in cultures where women are not considered autonomous, they are not in a position to refuse sex: they have to choose between unwanted sex and being subjected to violence; or between unwanted sex and being abandoned by their husbands and ending up living in abject poverty.

According to Sheila Jeffreys, in Western countries, "sexual liberation" ideologies have aggravated the problem of male sexual entitlement, leading to women submitting to unwanted sex not only due to physical force or illegal threat, but due to societal pressure: "The force which has operated on them [women] all their lives and continues to operate on them within marriages and relationships remains largely invisible. [...] Such forces include the massive industry of sexology, sex therapy, sex advice literature, all of which make women feel guilty and inadequate for any unwillingness to fulfill a man's sexual desires."

The prohibition of rape serves other purposes, such as protection of the rights of male relatives or husband, enforcing of religious laws against sex outside of marriage, or preservation of a woman's respect and reputation in society. Under such ideologies it is difficult to accept the concept of marital rape. Richard A. Posner writes that, "Traditionally, rape was the offense of depriving a father or husband of a valuable asset – his wife's chastity or his daughter's virginity". In many countries of the world, including Morocco, Algeria, Tunisia, Jordan, the severity of the legal punishment for rape depends on whether the victim was a virgin. Rhonda Copleon writes that, "Where rape is treated as a crime against honor, the honor of women is called into question and virginity or chastity is often a precondition."

=== The way marriages are arranged ===
In many cultures, marriages are still arranged for the purpose of procreation, property, and consolidation of extended family relations, often including a bride price or a dowry. In such situations, marriages are pre-arranged as an affair between families and clans. In some cultures, refusal of an arranged marriage is often a cause of an honor killing, because the family which has prearranged the marriage risks disgrace if the marriage does not proceed. Although laws that prohibiting dowries exist in many countries, men continue to demand a dowry in exchange for marriage, especially in rural areas where law enforcement is weak. In Bangladesh, dowry demand at marriage is linked to increased sexual violence. A woman attempting to obtain a divorce or separation without the consent of the husband/extended family can also be a trigger for honor killings. In cultures where marriages are arranged and goods are often exchanged between families, a woman's desire to seek a divorce is often viewed as an insult to the men who negotiated the deal.

However, the fact that people in developing countries are increasingly selecting marriage partners by whether they are in love – a much more Western world view – does not necessarily improve the situation. These types of marriages, especially in southeastern Nigeria, are putting women in more difficult positions: if one chooses to marry based on love against their family's wishes, admitting violence in the relationship is a disgrace because it means admitting that one made the wrong judgement.

=== Religion ===
==== Christianity ====
Most of the Western World has been strongly influenced by the Christian Bible. The paradisaical narrative of man and woman in Genesis establishes a foundation of marriage:

So God created man in His own image; in the image of God He created him; male and female He created them. [...] Therefore, a man shall leave his father and mother and be joined to his wife, and they shall become one flesh.

This doctrine is repeated in the Gospel by Jesus, but with the added conclusion "so then they are no longer two, but one flesh." The same doctrine is continued in the Epistles in the writings of the Apostle Paul.

It is further explicated by the Apostle Paul, who asserts that neither spouse should deny their partner sex:

The wife does not have authority over her own body, but the husband does. And likewise the husband does not have authority over his own body, but the wife does. Do not deprive one another except with consent for a time, that you may give yourselves to fasting and prayer; and come together again.

On the standing of each party to determine how this biblical principle—denial of conjugal relations—was to be effected was codified as an ecclesiastical canon in 280 A.D. by St. Dionysian of Alexandria: "Persons who are self-sufficient and married ought to be judges of themselves." The canon was given ecumenical application by the Sixth Ecumenical Council in 691 A.D. The Christian religion teaches that pre-marital sex is fornication, and sexual relations by a married person with someone other than their spouse is adultery, both of which are sins, while sex within marriage is a duty. This is interpreted by some religious figures as to render marital rape an impossibility. However, not all religious figures hold this view.

Further, Pentecostal Christianity prescribes gender expectations for married individuals that "…reestablish a patriarchal bargain…" in which "…women acquiesce to men's authority in return for certain kinds of support". Husbands are expected to provide for the family, and in return, wives are to submit to their husband's authority. Ultimately, this "…strengthens some of the gender dynamics that make intimate partner violence possible in the first place".

By contrast, Pope Paul VI in his 1968 encyclical letter Humanae vitae wrote that "Men rightly observe that a conjugal act imposed on one's partner without regard to his or her condition or personal and reasonable wishes in the matter, is no true act of love, and therefore offends the moral order in its particular application to the intimate relationship of husband and wife." This teaching, which has been reaffirmed more recently by Pope Francis, and has been interpreted by Bertrand de Margerie to condemn "intra-marital rape", and the use of force in marriage more generally.

==== Judaism ====
Marital or spousal rape is prohibited by Jewish law. Rabbinic Jewish law is generally based on rabbinic extrapolation from the Torah, and debate by generations of sages around various moral, ethical, and practical topics. The laws derived from these debates govern religious and social life. In the case of spousal rape, the law is derived in part from Proverbs 19:2, "Also, it is not good for the soul to be without knowledge [or wisdom], and he that hastens with his feet sins". This was stated by Rabbi Rami bar Ḥama said in the name of Rav Assi: "It is prohibited for a man to force his wife in the conjugal mitzvah, [i.e., sexual relations,] as it is stated: “And he who hastens with his feet sins” (Proverbs 19:2). [The term “his feet” is understood here as a euphemism for intercourse.]" Separately, Rava wrote (Ketubot 51b): "'Any woman against whom assault began under compulsion, even if it terminated with her consent,' is not considered to have committed adultery, but rather to have been raped."

Maimonides wrote that while a man's wife is "permitted to him at all times", a "husband may not force himself sexually on his wife, if she does not consent. Rather [intercourse] should be with the consent and happiness of both husband and wife." The Shulchan Aruch, a major code of Jewish law, addresses this concept in two separate rulings: "A man is forbidden to have intercourse with his wife if he is angry with her", and "He may not have intercourse without her consent, and if she is not interested he should appease her until she is interested."

=== Gender expectations ===
Another sustaining factor is the obligatory roles placed on wives and what they come to understand as their "duty". For example, "Vietnamese women are expected to sacrifice for their families, especially for their children, which includes, for some, acceding to husbands’ sexual demands". Their "duty" is to maintain family harmony and happiness. In Guatemala, violence within marriage is so normalized that wives come to believe that this is 'the way things are' and it is simply their role as a wife to endure the violence. This "normalization of violence [...] rests on a continuum of coercive power that makes possible the mistreatment of women not only in their homes but also in the community, neighborhood, and society at large". Further, because many of these women believe giving sex is their duty, they do not characterize their experience as marital rape. However, "women who have experienced forced sex in marriage understand this experience as an abuse or violation", they just may not characterize it as marital rape. Violence is so entrenched in many cultures it simply becomes a way of life, and wives are left to believe they must learn to endure it.

On the other hand, husbands are influenced by the expectations of their masculinity. In Africa, these expectations include being a husband, father, and head of the household which requires men to provide food, shelter and protection. Along with this "obligation of being the provider comes the privilege and authority of patriarchy". As a result, it is often the man's perception that his wife has challenged his authority that leads to the violence.

In the United States, masculinity is understood as a fixed entity that exists despite the changes of everyday life. It is understood as being in comparison to femininity, and more specifically, in opposition to femininity: Masculinity is to superiority as femininity is to subservience. Therefore, masculinity is correlated with aggression in such a way that scholars argue violence is a way for men to show their masculine identity. Another expectation of masculinity is that men are not to show their emotion. Instead, as R. W. Connell argues, the "masculine prototype" is a strong and stoic man who appears to remain in control of the situation and his emotions. This sense of control in Western masculinity has direct implications for domestic violence. Scholars argue that some men use violence to regain this sense of control when it is lost.

However, not all men who subscribe to masculinity expectations are violent. In fact, most men, in general, are not violent. For those who are violent, ideals of masculinity seem to play some causal role in their violence. Research shows that "violence is more likely among men who experience a disconnection between their personal circumstances and their emotions". Evidently, there seems to be some connection between the masculine expectation of suppressing or disconnecting from one's emotions, and one's tendency to be violent.

Marital rape that occurs in same-sex relationships or is perpetrated by women in heterosexual relationships is even less well studied.

== Universal lived experience ==
Although marital rape is not always defined as such in different cultures, there is a universal understanding of the violation that comes with rape. Yllö & Torres argue that "marital rape is regularly constituted across cultures as a locally recognized social violation—one that is understood to impede women in those particular cultural contexts from aspiring to a good human life." An aspect of this violation is the notion that the victim has not given their consent, however, historically and presently, consent is not always connected to marital sex. In the United States, a woman's personhood, and therefore her consent, only began with the suffragist movement that sought women's access to equal citizenship. Globally, many cultures do not require a woman's consent in marriage because procreation is at the root of such an alliance. Further, some women are forced into marriage where her consent is not considered or required. Despite this cultural variance, "women across many cultures do experience the violation of rape in marriage—even if the way that such violations are experienced and understood differs from culture to culture".

== Problems in prosecuting marital rape ==
The criminalization of marital rape does not necessarily mean that these laws are enforced. A lack of public awareness, as well as reluctance or outright refusal of authorities to prosecute is common globally. For instance, in Ireland, where marital rape was made illegal in 1990, by 2016 there had been only two persons convicted of marital rape. Additionally, gender norms that place wives in subservient positions to their husbands make it more difficult for women to recognize spousal rape or blame their spouse as the perpetrator.

Another problem results from prevailing social norms that exist. Thus, if the norms within a society do not see spousal rape as violative of social norms, marital rape laws are unlikely to produce successful prosecutions. For example, in Mali, it is considered unthinkable for a woman to refuse her husband's sexual demands; far from being seen as an act of abuse of a wife, marital rape is seen as an incident provoked by the wife who refused to perform her duty: for instance one survey found that 74% of women in Mali said that a husband is justified to beat his wife if she refuses to have sex with him.

Other problems arise from the fact that, in some countries where marital rape is illegal, many people are not aware of the existing laws. In some parts of the world marital rape laws are new and rarely enacted, therefore, some people are not aware of their existence. Alternatively, traditional norms concerning marriage may be deeply rooted in the conscience of the population. Substantial segments of the population may therefore not conceptualize that in any modern views of sexuality, forcing a spouse to have sex is wrong, much less illegal. For instance, a report by Amnesty International showed that although marital rape is illegal in Hungary, in a public opinion poll of nearly 1,200 people in 2006, a total of 62% did not know that marital rape was a punishable crime: over 41% of men and nearly 56% of women thought it was not punishable as a crime in Hungarian law, and nearly 12% did not know. In Hong Kong, in 2003, 16 months after the criminalization of marital rape, a survey showed that 40% of women did not know it was illegal. A 2010 study in South Africa, (where marital rape was made illegal in 1993), showed that only 55% of respondents agreed with the affirmation "I think it is possible for a woman to be raped by her husband".

Although in recent years some countries in Africa have enacted laws against marital rape, in most parts of the continent forced marital sex is not a criminal offense. A 2003 report by Human Rights Watch stated that: "With few exceptions across Africa, marital rape is not recognized as a crime, and domestic violence is seen as a right of married men." The acceptability of domestic violence in most African countries is very high: surveys showed that the percentage of women aged 15–49 who think that a husband is justified in hitting or beating his wife under certain circumstances is, for example, 87% in Mali, 86% in Guinea, 80% in Central African Republic, 79% in South Sudan. Although more countries in Africa are now enacting laws against domestic violence, social norms make it difficult to enforce these laws; and many women are not aware of their rights: for instance in Ethiopia in a survey only 49% of women knew that wife-beating is illegal (it was made illegal under the 2004 Criminal Code). The lack of legal and social recognition of marital rape in Africa has been cited as making the fight against HIV harder.

== Legislation by country ==
Marital rape legislation by country
Country	Criminalised	Notes
Afghanistan	No	The EVAW law criminalizes 22 acts of violence against women, including rape, battery, or beating; forced marriage; humiliation; intimidation; and deprivation of inheritance. Under the law rape does not include spousal rape.
Albania	Yes	The Criminal Code was amended in 2012 and 2013 to criminalise marital rape.
Algeria	No	The law criminalizes rape but does not address spousal rape.
Andorra	Yes	Spousal rape can be punished by up to 15 years imprisonment.
Angola	Yes	Rape, including spousal rape, is illegal and punishable by up to eight years’ imprisonment.
Antigua and Barbuda	No	The Sexual Offences Act, 1995, includes in the definition of rape: "with a female person who is not his wife".
Argentina	Yes	Rape of men and women, including spousal rape, can be punished by imprisonment from six months to up to 20 years.
Armenia	Yes	Rape is a criminal offense, and conviction carries a maximum sentence of 15 years; general rape statutes applied to the prosecution of spousal rape.
Australia	Yes	In 1990, the Criminal Law Act was amended to abolish the exemption from punishment in cases where a husband raped his wife. The government enforced the law effectively. The laws of individual states and territories provide the penalties for rape.
Austria	Yes	Spousal rape can be punished by up to 15 years imprisonment.
Azerbaijan	Yes	Spousal rape is illegal, but observers stated police did not effectively investigate such claims.
The Bahamas	No	Rape of men or women is illegal, but the law does not protect against spousal rape, except if the couple is separated or in the process of divorce, or if there is a restraining order in place.
Bahrain	No	Rape is illegal, although the criminal code allows an alleged rapist to marry his victim to avoid punishment. The law does not address spousal rape.
Bangladesh	No	The law prohibits rape of a female by a male and physical spousal abuse, but the law excludes marital rape if the female is above 13.
Barbados	No	There are legal protections against spousal rape for women holding a court-issued divorce decree, separation order, or non-molestation order.
Belarus	Yes	As of 2018.
Belgium	Yes	Marital rape was criminalised by court decision in 1979. The criminal code was amended in 1989 to treat marital rape the same as other forms of rape.
Belize	Yes	The criminal code criminalizes rape of men or women, including spousal rape. The code states that a person convicted of rape shall be sentenced to imprisonment for eight years to life.
Benin	Yes	The law explicitly prohibits spousal rape and provides the maximum penalty of 5 years imprisonment for conviction of raping a domestic partner.
Bhutan	Yes	Spousal rape is illegal and prosecuted as a misdemeanor.
Bolivia	Yes	In 2013 the government passed the Law Guaranteeing Women a Life Free from Violence, it included the repeal of the marital rape exemption in the Penal Code.
Bosnia and Herzegovina	Yes	The maximum penalty for rape, regardless of gender, including spousal rape, is 15 years in prison. The failure of police to treat spousal rape as a serious offense inhibited the effective enforcement of the law.
Botswana	No	The law criminalizes rape but does not recognize spousal rape as a crime.
Brazil	Yes	The law criminalizes rape of men or women, including spousal rape.
Brunei	No	The law does not criminalize spousal rape and explicitly states that sexual intercourse by a man with his wife is not rape, as long as she is not younger than 14 years (15 years if she is ethnic Chinese).
Bulgaria	Yes	The law criminalizes rape, and authorities generally enforced its provisions when violations came to their attention. Sentences for rape convictions range up 20 years in prison. While authorities could prosecute spousal rape under the general rape statute, they rarely did so.
Burkina Faso	Yes	As of 2018.
Burundi	Yes	The law prohibits rape, including spousal rape, with penalties of up to 30 years’ imprisonment. The government did not enforce the law uniformly, and rape and other domestic and sexual violence continued to be serious problems.
Cameroon	Yes	As of 2018
Canada	Yes	The law criminalizes rape of men or women, including spousal rape, as sexual assault, and the government enforces the law effectively.
Cambodia	Yes	Spousal rape is not specifically mentioned in the penal code, but the underlying conduct can be prosecuted as “rape,” “causing injury,” or “indecent assault.” Charges for spousal rape under the penal code and the domestic violence law were rare.
Cape Verde	Yes	Spousal rape is implicitly covered by the 2001 gender-based violence law; penalties for conviction range from one to five years’ imprisonment.
Central African Republic	No	As of 2018.
Chad	Yes	As of 2018.
Chile	Yes	The law criminalises rape of men or women, including spousal rape. Penalties for rape range from five to 15 years’ imprisonment.
China	No	The law does not safeguard same-sex couples or victims of marital rape.
Colombia	Yes	Although prohibited by law, rape, including spousal rape, remained a serious problem.
Comoros	Yes	As of 2018.
Republic of the Congo	No	As of 2017, there were no specific provisions in the law outlawing spousal battery other than general statutes prohibiting assault. Rape is illegal, but the government did not effectively enforce the law, and women's rights groups have reported that spousal rape was common.
Democratic Republic of Congo	No	The legal definition of rape does not include spousal rape.
Costa Rica	Yes	The law criminalizes rape of men or women, including spousal rape and domestic violence, and provides penalties from 10 to 18 years in prison for rape. The judicial branch generally enforced the law.
Croatia	Yes	Conviction of rape, including spousal rape, is punishable by up to 15 years imprisonment.
Cuba	Yes	The law specifically criminalizes rape of women, including spousal rape, and separately criminalizes “lascivious abuse” against both genders. The government enforced both laws. Penalties for rape are at least four years’ imprisonment.
Cyprus	Yes	The law criminalizes rape, including spousal rape, with a maximum sentence of life in prison for violations. The government enforced the law effectively. Spousal rape is also criminalzed in the area administered by Turkish Cypriots (Turkish Republic of Northern Cyprus).
Czech Republic	Yes	The explicit exclusion of marital rape was removed from Czechoslovak penal code in 1950. Since then it is punishable as other cases of rape. The current law prohibits rape, including spousal rape, and provides a penalty of two to 15 years in prison for violations.
Denmark	Yes	The law criminalizes rape against women or men (the statute is gender neutral), including spousal rape, and domestic violence. Penalties for rape include imprisonment for up to 12 years.
Djibouti	Yes	As of 2018.
Dominica	Yes	The Sexual Offences (Amendment) Act 2016 repealed the previous "marital exclusions" of the rape law and introduced a specific marital rape section [s3 (3)] to the Sexual Offences Act.
Dominican Republic	Yes	The law criminalizes rape of men or women, including spousal rape, and other forms of violence against women, such as incest and sexual aggression. The sentences for conviction of rape range from 10 to 15 years in prison and a fine of 100,000 to 200,000 pesos.
East Timor	Yes	Although rape, including marital rape, is a crime punishable by up to 20 years in prison, failures to investigate or prosecute cases of alleged rape and sexual abuse were common.
Ecuador	Yes	The law criminalizes rape of men or women, including spousal rape and domestic violence. Rape is punishable with penalties of up to 22 years in prison.
Egypt	No	The law prohibits rape, prescribing criminal penalties of 15 to 25 years’ imprisonment, or life imprisonment for cases of rape involving armed abduction. Spousal rape is not illegal, based on a 1928 Court of Cassation ruling that "a wife cannot withhold sex from her husband without a valid reason according to sharia".
El Salvador	Unclear	Marital rape is not specifically addressed by statue. The World Bank's 2018 " "Women, Business and the Law" report states that the country's general rape laws apply to marital rape. The 2017 El Salvador Country Report on Human Rights Practices suggests this is only at a judge's discretion. An earlier (2011) report, the "UN Womens Justice Report" states there are no laws covering marital rape.
Equatorial Guinea	Yes	As of 2018.
Eritrea	No	As of 2018.
Estonia	Yes	The law criminalizes rape, including spousal rape, and physical abuse, including domestic violence. The penalty for rape, including spousal rape, is imprisonment for up to 15 years.
Eswatini (Swaziland)	Yes	
Ethiopia	No	As of 2018.
Fiji	Yes	Rape (including spousal rape), domestic abuse, incest, and indecent assault were significant problems; there was a large increase in the reported number of rape cases this year, due at least in part to greater awareness that a spouse can be charged with rape of his/her partner. The law provides for a maximum punishment of life imprisonment for rape. The law recognizes spousal rape as a specific offense.
Finland	Yes	The law criminalizes rape, including spousal rape, and the government enforced the law effectively. Rape is punishable by up to four years’ imprisonment. If the offender used violence, the offense is considered aggravated, and the penalty may be more severe.
France	Yes	The law criminalizes rape, including spousal rape, and domestic violence, and the government generally enforced the law effectively. The penalty for rape is 15 years’ imprisonment, which may be increased. The government and NGOs provided shelters, counseling, and hotlines for rape survivors.
Gabon	Yes	As of 2018
Gambia	No	Spousal rape is not illegal and was widespread;, police generally considered it a domestic issue outside its jurisdiction.
Georgia	Yes	As of 2018.
Germany	Yes	The law criminalizes rape, including spousal rape, and provides penalties of up to 15 years in prison.
Ghana	Yes	As of 2018
Greece	Yes	Rape, including spousal rape, is a crime punishable by penalties ranging from five to 20 years’ imprisonment.
Grenada	Yes	Marital rape was criminalized in a 2012 amendment to the Criminal Code.
Guatemala	Yes	The law criminalizes rape of men or women, including spousal rape, and sets penalties between five and 50 years in prison. Police had minimal training or capacity to investigate sexual crimes or assist survivors of such crimes, and the government did not enforce the law effectively.
Guinea	Yes	As of 2018.
Guinea-Bissau	Yes	The law prohibits rape, including spousal rape, and provides penalties for conviction of two to 12 years in prison; however, the government did not effectively enforce the law.
Guyana	Yes	Marital rape was criminalised by the Sexual Offenses Act 2010.
Haiti	No	While the law prohibits rape of men or women, it does not recognize spousal rape as a crime.
Honduras	Yes	The law criminalizes all forms of rape of men or women, including spousal rape, but unlike other rapes is not a "public crime" and thereby requires the survivors to complain for prosecution to occur.
Hong Kong	Yes	As of 2018.
Hungary	Yes	Rape of men or women, including spousal rape, is illegal.
Iceland	Yes	As of 2018.
India	No	Marital rape is not criminalized as rape under the Bharatiya Nyaya Sanhita.
Indonesia	Yes	Marital rape is not a specific criminal offense under the penal code, but it is covered under "forced sexual intercourse" in national legislation on domestic violence, and it can be punished with criminal penalties. Nevertheless, marital rape can be considered a form of domestic violence under the Law Regarding the Elimination of Violence in the Household, 2004.
Iran	No	Rape is illegal and subject to strict penalties, including death, but it remained a problem. The law considers sex within marriage consensual by definition and, therefore, does not address spousal rape, including in cases of forced marriage.
Iraq	No	The law criminalizes rape (but not spousal rape) and permits a maximum sentence of life imprisonment if the victim dies. The law allows authorities to drop a rape case if the perpetrator marries the victim.
Ireland	Yes	The law criminalizes rape, including spousal rape, and the government enforced the law. Most persons convicted received prison sentences of five to 12 years.
Israel	Yes	Rape, including spousal rape, is a felony punishable by 16 years in prison, or up to 20 years' imprisonment for rape under aggravated circumstances or if the perpetrator rapes or commits a sexual offense against a relative. The government effectively enforced rape laws.
Italy	Yes	The prescribed penalty for rape, including spousal rape, is five to 12 years in prison.
Ivory Coast	Yes	As of 2018.
Jamaica	No	The law criminalizes spousal rape only when spouses have separated or begun proceedings to dissolve the marriage; when the husband is under a court order not to molest or cohabit with his wife; or when the husband knows he suffers from a sexually transmitted infection.
Japan	Yes	The law criminalizes all forms of rape involving force against women. The law does not deny spousal rape, but no court has ever ruled on such a case, except in situations of marital breakdown (i.e., formal or informal separation, etc.).
Jordan	No	The law stipulates a sentence of at least 10 years of imprisonment with hard labor for the rape of a girl or woman 15 years of age or older. Spousal rape is not illegal.
Kazakhstan	Yes	The law criminalizes rape. The punishment for rape, including spousal rape, ranges from three to 15 years’ imprisonment. There were reports of police and judicial reluctance to act on reports of rape, particularly in spousal rape cases.
Kenya	Yes	The law criminalizes rape, defilement, sexual violence within marriage, but enforcement remained limited.
Kiribati	Yes	Rape, including spousal rape, is a crime, with a maximum penalty of life in prison, but sentences typically were much shorter.
Kosovo	Yes	As of 2018.
North Korea	No	As of 2018.
South Korea	Yes/No	There is no specific statute in South Korean law that defines spousal rape as illegal. Nevertheless, the Supreme Court acknowledged marital rape as illegal. The penalty for rape ranges from a minimum of three years’ to life imprisonment although it depends on various specific circumstances.
Kuwait	No	Rape carries a maximum penalty of death, which the courts occasionally imposed for the crime; spousal rape and domestic violence are not considered crimes.
Kyrgyzstan	Yes	Rape, including spousal rape, is illegal, but the government failed to enforce the law effectively. Police generally regarded spousal rape as an administrative, rather than a criminal, offense.
Laos	No	Domestic violence is illegal, but there is no law against marital rape, and domestic violence often went unreported due to social stigma.
Latvia	Yes	Spousal rape is explicitly considered rape with “aggravated circumstances.”
Lebanon	Yes/No	Article 503 of the Penal Code defines rape as "forced sexual intercourse [against someone] who is not his wife by violence or threat." In May 2014 the Protection of Women and Other Family Members from Domestic Violence Law added new offences of the use of threats or violence to claim a "marital right to intercourse."
Lesotho	Yes	The law criminalizes the rape of women or men, including spousal rape, and domestic violence. Rape convictions carry a minimum sentence of 10 years’ imprisonment.
Liberia	Yes	As of 2018.
Libya	No	The law criminalizes rape but does not address spousal rape. By law a convicted rapist may avoid a 25-year prison sentence by marrying the survivor, regardless of her wishes—provided her family consents.
Liechtenstein	Yes	Rape, including spousal rape, is a criminal offense. Penalties for rape and sexual violence vary between one and 15 years' imprisonment, depending on the degree of violence and humiliation of the victim, and between 10 years' and lifetime imprisonment if the victim is killed.
Lithuania	Yes	Rape and domestic violence are criminal offenses, and although no law specifically criminalises spousal rape, a wife can file a complaint against her husband for rape or sexual assault under Article 149 of the Criminal Code.
Luxembourg	Yes	The law prohibits rape, including spousal rape, and the government enforced the law effectively. Penalties for violations range from five to 10 years’ imprisonment.
Madagascar	Yes	As of 2018.
Malawi	Yes	The Marriage, Divorce, and Family Relations Act enacted in 2015 explicitly introduces the concept of spousal rape, but the act does not prescribe specific penalties and applies only to legally separated spouses. Spousal rape may be prosecuted under the rape provisions of the penal code.
Malaysia	Yes/No	The concept of rape within marriage is not recognised. However, if a man "uses harm or the threat of violence to obtain sex from his wife, or any other person", he may be imprisoned up to five years if convicted according to Section 375A of the Penal Code (adopted on 7 September 2007).
Maldives	No	The Sexual Offences Act (Act 17/2014) excludes marital rape, except in very narrow circumstances such as the couple are legally separated or one has a STI.
Mali	Yes	No law specifically prohibits spousal rape, but law enforcement officials stated criminal laws against rape apply to spousal rape.
Malta	Yes	Rape, including, spousal rape, carries a sentence of up to nine years in prison with increased penalties in aggravated circumstances.
Marshall Islands	Yes	The law criminalizes rape, including spousal rape, and establishes penalties of up to 25 years’ imprisonment for first-degree sexual assault.
Mauritania	Yes	Rape, including spousal rape, is illegal. Rapists who are single men face penalties of forced labor and whipping, and married rapists are subject to the death penalty.
Mauritius	Yes	Amendments to the Protection from Domestic Violence Act (PDVA) came into force in September 2016. The amendments redefine the term "spouse" to include unmarried couples of the opposite sex; redefine "domestic violence" to include verbal, psychological, economic, and sexual abuses. Although the amendments do not mention spousal rape, section 2.d. stipulates that a spouse cannot force or threaten the other partner into a sexual act "from which the spouse or the other person has the right to abstain."
Mexico	Yes	Federal law criminalizes rape of men or women, including spousal rape, and conviction carries penalties of up to 20 years’ imprisonment. Twenty-four states have laws criminalizing spousal rape.
Federated States of Micronesia	No	As of 2018.
Moldova	Yes	The law criminalizes rape or forcible sexual assault and establishes penalties for violations ranging from three years to life in prison. The law also criminalizes spousal rape.
Monaco	Yes	Rape, including spousal rape, is a criminal offense with penalties of five, 10, and up to 20 years in prison, depending on the type of offense.
Mongolia	Yes	The criminal code outlaws sexual intercourse through physical violence, or threat of violence, and provides for sentences of one to 20 years’ imprisonment or life imprisonment, depending on the circumstances. Under the new criminal code, spousal rape was criminalized.
Montenegro	Yes	In most cases the penalty provided by law for rape, including spousal rape, is one to 10 years in prison. In practice, the average conviction resulted in 3 years.
Morocco	No	Spousal rape is not a crime. "Hakkaoui Law" (named after Minister for Family Affairs and Women's Issues, Bassima Hakkaoui, criminalising violence against women has come into force in September 2018 but failed to address marital rape.
Mozambique	Yes	The law criminalizes rape, including spousal rape, and domestic violence. Penalties for conviction range from two to eight years’ imprisonment if the victim is 12 years of age or older and 20 to 24 years’ imprisonment if the victim is under 12.
Myanmar	No	Spousal rape is not a crime unless the wife is younger than 13 years.
Namibia	Yes	The law criminalizes rape of men and women, including spousal rape. By law rape is defined as the commitment of any sexual act under coercive circumstances. The courts tried numerous cases of rape during the year, and the government generally enforced court sentences providing between five and 45 years’ imprisonment for those convicted.
Nauru	Yes	Rape is a crime and carries a maximum penalty of 25 years’ imprisonment. The 2016 Crimes Act specifically applies penalties for rape of married and de facto partners.
Nepal	Yes	Section 219 (4) of the 2017 Criminal Code Bill states, "If a man rapes his wife when he is still in marital relationship with her, he shall be sentenced to up to five years in jail." Marital rape was also criminalised under the previous Criminal Code.
Netherlands	Yes	The law in all parts of the kingdom criminalizes rape, including spousal rape, and domestic violence. The penalty is imprisonment not exceeding 12 years, a fine not exceeding 78 thousand euros ($93,600), or both. In case of violence against a spouse, the penalty for various forms of abuse can be increased by one-third.
New Zealand	Yes	The law criminalizes rape, including spousal rape. The maximum penalty is 20 years’ imprisonment.
Nicaragua	Yes	The law criminalizes all forms of rape of men or women, regardless of the relationship between the victim and the accused. Sentences for those convicted of rape range from eight to 12 years’ imprisonment.
Niger	Yes	As of 2018.
Nigeria	No	As of 2018.
North Macedonia	Yes	The penalties for rape, including spousal rape, range from one to 15 years’ imprisonment.
Norway	Yes	The law criminalizes rape, including spousal rape, and the government generally enforced the law. The penalty for rape is up to 21 years in prison, depending on the severity of the assault, the age of the victim, and the circumstances in which the crime occurred.
Oman	No	The law criminalizes rape with penalties of up to 15 years in prison but does not criminalize spousal rape.
Pakistan	Yes	The Offence of Zina (Enforcement of Hudood) Ordinance, 1979 included in its definition of rape "to whom he or she is not validly married". This ordinance was repealed by the Protection of Women (Criminal Laws Amendment) Act, 2006 and rape was now defined in Section 375 of the Penal Code. The new definition did not include a reference to marriage. It was argued that the intent was to include marital rape in the offence. However, as of February 2015, there were no reports of a case being brought before a superior court to clarify the law.
Palau	Yes	Rape, including spousal rape, is a crime punishable by a maximum 25 years' imprisonment, a fine of $50,000 (national currency is U.S. dollar), or both.
Palestine	No	As of 2018
Panama	Yes	The law criminalizes rape of men or women, including spousal rape, with prison terms of five to 10 years.
Papua New Guinea	Yes	Rape, including spousal rape, is a crime punishable by imprisonment ranging from 15 years to life. The legal system allows village chiefs to negotiate the payment of compensation in lieu of trials for rapists.
Paraguay	Yes	The law criminalizes rape of men or women, including spousal rape, and provides penalties of up to 10 years in prison for rape or sexual assault.
Peru	Yes	The law criminalizes rape of men or women, including spousal rape, with penalties of six to eight years in prison.
Philippines	Yes	Rape, including spousal rape, is illegal, with penalties ranging from 12 to 40 years' imprisonment. An anti-rape law covering marital rape was passed in 1997.
Poland	Yes	Rape, including spousal rape, is illegal and punishable by up to 12 years in prison.
Portugal	Yes	The law makes rape, including spousal rape, illegal, with a penalty of three to 10 years’ imprisonment.
Peru	Yes	
Qatar	Yes	The law criminalizes rape. Spousal rape is not explicitly criminalized, but a woman may file a complaint. The penalty for rape is life imprisonment, regardless of the age or gender of the victim.
Romania	Yes	Rape, including spousal rape, is illegal. The law provides for three to 10 years' imprisonment for rape and two to seven years' imprisonment for sexual assault.
Russia	Yes	As of 2018.
Rwanda	Yes	The law criminalizes rape of men and women and spousal rape, and the government handled rape cases as a judicial priority. Penalties for conviction of spousal rape range from two months’ to life imprisonment with fines of 100,000 to 300,000 Rwandan francs.
Saint Kitts and Nevis	Yes	
Saint Lucia	No	The law criminalizes spousal rape only when a couple is divorced or separated or when there is a protection order from the Family Court.
Saint Vincent and the Grenadines	Yes	Rape, including spousal rape, is illegal, and the government generally enforced the law when victims came forward. Sentences for rape begin at 10 years' imprisonment.
Samoa	Yes	As of 2018.
San Marino	Yes	Rape, including spousal rape, is a criminal offense, and the government effectively prosecuted persons accused of such crimes. The penalty for rape is two to six years in prison.
São Tomé and Príncipe	Yes	Rape, including spousal rape, is illegal and punishable by two to 12 years' imprisonment.
Saudi Arabia	No	Rape is a criminal offense under sharia with a wide range of penalties from flogging to execution. The law does not recognize spousal rape as a crime.
Senegal	Yes	As of 2018.
Serbia	Yes	Rape, including spousal rape, is punishable by up to 40 years in prison. The government did not enforce the law effectively.
Seychelles	Yes	Rape, spousal rape, and domestic abuse are criminal offenses for which conviction is punishable by a maximum of 20 years’ imprisonment. Nevertheless, rape was a problem, and the government did not enforce the law effectively.
Sierra Leone	Yes	The law criminalizes rape for which conviction is punishable by between five and 15 years’ imprisonment. Rape was common and viewed more as a societal norm than a criminal problem. The law specifically prohibits spousal rape.
Singapore	Yes	In 2019, the Penal Code was amended under the Criminal Law Reform Act and Protection from Harassment (Amendment) Act to abolish the exemption from punishment in cases of marital rape. It went into force on 1 January 2020, criminalizing marital rape.
Slovakia	Yes	The explicit exclusion of marital rape was removed from Czechoslovak penal code in 1950. Since then it is punishable as other cases of rape. The current law prohibits rape and sexual violence, which carry a penalty of five to 25 years in prison.
Slovenia	Yes	Rape, including spousal rape and domestic violence, is illegal. Sexual violence is a criminal offense carrying a penalty from six months’ to eight years’ imprisonment. The penalty for rape is one to 10 years in prison. Police actively investigated accusations of rape and prosecuted offenders.
Solomon Islands	Yes	The law criminalizes rape, including spousal rape, with a maximum penalty of life imprisonment.
Somalia	Yes	There are no federal laws against spousal violence, including rape, although in May 2016, the Council of Ministers approved a national gender policy that gives the government the right to sue anyone convicted of committing gender-based violence, such as the killing or rape of a woman.
South Africa	Yes	Rape, including spousal rape, is illegal and remained a serious and pervasive problem. The minimum sentence for rape is 10 years in prison for the first offense.
South Sudan	No	The law defines sexual intercourse within marriage as “not rape.”
Spain	Yes	The law prohibits rape, including spousal rape, and the government generally enforced the law effectively. The penalty for rape is six to 12 years in prison.
Sri Lanka	No	The law only prohibits spousal rape if the spouses are legally separated.
Sudan	Yes	In February 2015, an amendment to Article 149 of the Criminal Code changed the definition of rape. Under the new definition of rape, rape victim could no longer be prosecuted for adultery. Although there is no specific prohibition of marital rape, the amendment makes it possible to prosecute marital rape.
Suriname	Yes	The law criminalizes rape of women, including spousal rape, and prescribes penalties for rape or forcible sexual assault of between 12 and 15 years’ imprisonment, and fines up to 100,000 Surinamese dollars.
Sweden	Yes	Rape, including spousal rape and domestic violence, are illegal, and the government enforced the law effectively. Penalties range from two to 10 years in prison.
Switzerland	Yes	Rape, including spousal rape, and domestic violence, are statutory offenses for which penalties range from one to 10 years in prison. The government effectively prosecuted individuals accused of such crimes.
Syria	No	Rape is a felony, subject to punishment by at least 15 years in prison, but the government did not enforce the law. The law further stipulates that if the rapist marries the victim, the rapist receives no punishment. The victim's family sometimes agreed to this arrangement to avoid the social stigma attached to rape. There are no laws against spousal rape.
Taiwan	Yes	The law criminalizes rape, including spousal rape, and domestic violence.
Tajikistan	No	Marital rape is not recognised as a criminal offence.
Tanzania	No	The law provides for life imprisonment for persons convicted of rape, including spousal rape during periods of legal separation.
Thailand	Yes	Rape is illegal, although the government did not always enforce the law effectively. The law permits authorities to prosecute spousal rape, and prosecutions occurred. The law specifies penalties for conviction of rape or forcible sexual assault ranging from four years’ imprisonment to the death penalty as well as fines.
Togo	Yes	The law criminalizes rape, but if reported, the law was often not enforced effectively by authorities. The law provides for five to 10 years’ imprisonment for conviction of rape and a fine of two million to 10 million CFA francs. Conviction of spousal rape is punishable by up to 720 hours of community service and a fine of 200,000 to one million CFA francs.
Tonga	Yes	Rape is punishable by a maximum of 15 years in prison. The law recognizes spousal rape.
Trinidad and Tobago	Yes	Rape of men or women, including spousal rape, is illegal and punishable by up to life imprisonment, but the courts often imposed considerably shorter sentences.
Tunisia	Yes	Prior to June 2017, marital rape was not considered a crime. Although Article 227 of the Penal Code does not exclude marital rape from its provisions, Article 23 of the Personal Status Code mandated partners in marriage to “fulfil their conjugal duties according to practice and customs,” On 27 June 2017, the Tunisian Parliament unanimously passed a comprehensive law addressing all forms of gender-based violence, including physical, economic, and social violence. The provisions of this law include marital rape.
Turkey	Yes	The law prohibits sexual assault, including rape and spousal rape, with penalties of two to 10 years’ imprisonment for conviction of attempted sexual violation and at least 12 years’ imprisonment for conviction of rape or sexual violation.
Turkmenistan	Yes	Marital rape is illegal and punishable by sentences ranging from 3 to 25 years imprisonment.
Tuvalu	No	Rape is a crime punishable by a minimum sentence of five years’ imprisonment, but spousal rape is not included in the legal definition of this offense.
Uganda	Yes	As of 2018.
Ukraine	Yes	The law prohibits rape of men or women but does not explicitly address spousal rape or domestic violence. The courts may use a law against "forced sex with a materially dependent person" as grounds to prosecute spousal rape.
United Arab Emirates	No	The penal code does not address spousal rape. In October the Dubai Court of First Instance sentenced a policeman to six months in jail for raping his fiancée. The defendant argued that he considered the two married at the time of the offense.
United Kingdom	Yes	The law criminalizes rape, spousal rape, and domestic violence. The maximum legal penalty for rape is life imprisonment. The law also provides for injunctive relief, personal protection orders, and protective exclusion orders (similar to restraining orders) for female victims of violence.
United States	Yes	Main article: Marital rape (United States law) Marital rape is illegal in all 50 US states.
Uruguay	Yes	The law criminalizes rape of men or women, including spousal rape, and domestic violence. The law allows for sentences of two to 12 years' imprisonment for a person found guilty of rape, and authorities effectively enforced the law.
Uzbekistan	Yes	Rape, including marital rape, is prohibited, however the courts did not try any rape cases as of 2017, according to human rights activists.
Vanuatu	Yes/No	The law does not specifically criminalize spousal rape, but it can be prosecuted under related statutes that cover assault and domestic violence. Police, however, were frequently reluctant to intervene in what they considered domestic matters.
Venezuela	Yes	The law criminalizes rape of men or women, including spousal rape, making it punishable by a prison term of eight to 14 years.
Vietnam	Yes	The Law criminalizes rape, including spousal rape, for men and women. The law subjects rapists to two to seven years’ imprisonment, or up to 15 years in severe cases.
Yemen	No	The law criminalizes rape, but it does not criminalize spousal rape because the law states a woman may not refuse sexual relations with her husband.
Zambia	Yes	The 2010 Anti-Gender-based Violence Act criminalizes spousal rape.
Zimbabwe	Yes	While the law criminalizes sexual offenses, including rape and spousal rape, these crimes remained widespread problems. Spousal rape received less attention than physical violence against women.

== See also ==
- Outline of domestic violence
- Criticism of marriage
- Implied consent
- Maouloud Baby v. State of Maryland, court case having to do with the withdrawing of sexual consent
- Marital rape in India
- National Clearinghouse on Marital and Date Rape
- Sexual violence by intimate partners
- Types of rape
- Victimology
- Women Against Rape
