= Marital rape in the United States =

In the United States, marital rape refers to the unlawful and collective forms of partner rape, domestic violence, and/or sexual abuse by a marital spouse onto another and is illegal in all 50 US states. The exact causes of offense vary by state, however, and if the unlawful act is another form of sexual assault.

Prior to the 1970s, marital rape was legal in every US state and only first became partially outlawed in Michigan and Delaware in 1974, then wholly outlawed in South Dakota and Nebraska in 1975. The court case Oregon v. Rideout in 1978 was the first in which someone stood trial for raping their spouse while they lived together.

By 1993, marital rape was a crime nationwide. Still, in the 1990s, most states continued to differentiate between the way marital rape and non-marital rape were viewed and treated. The laws surrounding marital rape in the US continue to change and evolve, with most states reforming their laws far into the 21st century. However, there are still states where marital rape and non-marital rape are treated quite differently under the law with the definition of what is "marital rape" or non-marital rape being disputed in some states.

== History ==
=== Background ===
The views which contributed to rape laws not being applicable in marriage can be traced, at least partially, to 17th century English common law, which was imported to the British American colonies. The 17th-century English jurist, Sir Matthew Hale (1609–1676), stated the position of the common law in The History of the Pleas of the Crown (posthumously, 1736) that a "husband cannot be guilty of a rape committed by himself upon his lawful wife, for by their mutual matrimonial consent and contract the wife hath given up herself in this kind to her husband which she cannot retract". The ruling, although no legal record of which is found earlier than Hale, likely relied on even earlier standards. In a case of Lord Audley's (1488–1544), for instance, he cites the jurist Bracton (c.1210 – c.1268) in support of this rule, said to be derived from laws of King Æthelstan (r. 927–939) whereupon the law holds that even "were the party of no chaste life, but a whore, yet there may be ravishment: but it is a good plea to say she was his concubine". This would continue to be accepted as a statement of the law in England and Wales until it was overturned by the House of Lords in the case of R v R in 1991, where it was described as an anachronistic and offensive legal fiction.

=== 1970s: change begins ===
In the United States, prior to the mid-1970s marital rape was exempted from ordinary rape laws. The exemption is also found in the 1962 Model Penal Code, which stated that "A male who has sexual intercourse with a female not his wife is guilty of rape if: ..."

Michigan and Delaware reduced their legal tolerance of marital rape in 1974 but did not entirely eliminate the spousal exception in their rape laws. Michigan criminalized marital rape only when a couple had filed for divorce and were living apart. Delaware criminalized rape of a "voluntary social companion," which could include a wife; this crime was treated less seriously than other forms of rape.

South Dakota totally outlawed marital rape from 1975 to 1977. A bill introduced by Senator Grace Mickelson quietly struck the spousal exemption from state law. The exception was restored not long afterward. According to The New York Times, South Dakota was the first state to outlaw marital rape.

Nebraska also eliminated the spousal exemption in 1975. The state modernized its law to use the term "sexual assault" rather than "rape", and to be gender neutral, rather than to assume a male perpetrator and female victim. The change in law was the result of advocacy by second wave feminist organizations and victim advocacy groups in Nebraska, and was introduced to the legislature by Senator Wally Barnett.

Some laws of the 1970s required the husband and wife to no longer be living together for marital rape charges to be brought. The case in the United States that first challenged this cohabitation clause was Oregon v. Rideout in 1978. In this case, the husband was accused of raping his wife, the first man in the United States to be charged with raping his wife while they were still living together. The trial was the first in Oregon relating to marital rape since the state revised its rape law in 1977 to eliminate the marital rape exception. Although the husband was acquitted of raping his wife, it spurred the reform movement, with many American states beginning to allow prosecution for marital and cohabitation rape.

=== Laws change in all states by 1993 ===
In some states, courts have struck down the marital exemption as unconstitutional. In the 1984 New York Court of Appeals case of People v. Liberta, Judge Sol Wachtler stated that "a marriage license should not be viewed as a license for a husband to forcibly rape his wife with impunity. A married woman has the same right to control her own body as does an unmarried woman". Similarly, in Alabama, the marital exemptions from the sodomy law (Williams v. State (1986)) and from the rape law (Merton v. State (1986)) were found unconstitutional.

By 1993, all states had withdrawn the marital rape exemptions, the last states to do so being Oklahoma and North Carolina (both in 1993) or the exemption had been declared judicially to be unconstitutional.

Though laws had changed in every state by 1993, in only 17 states was marital rape treated the same as non-marital rape. In the other states, there continued to be significant differences in the way marital rape and non-marital rape were treated, such as less severe penalties, or excluding situations where no violence is used, or shorter reporting periods.

=== Toward uniform treatment ===
During the 1990s many states differentiated between three categories of victims:

- Unmarried persons, who had full protection by sexual offenses laws,
- Married persons who were in an abnormal marriage (e.g. separated, one spouse had filed for divorce etc.), who were often treated in an intermediate way, although many states treated them either as unmarried persons or as married cohabiting persons, and
- Married persons cohabiting (spouses living together under ordinary circumstances), many state laws were initially very restrictive, criminalizing only the "worst" forms of domestic sexual violence (e.g. requiring violence, a higher level of threat, injury etc.; and often punishing the crime less severely).

In the 1990s and beyond, feminists, women's and other organizations continued to lobby for the amendment of marital rape laws to ensure marital rape is regarded and treated like any other rape. Though rape laws in the United States are not uniform, and the laws have been changed numerous times, differences remain in some states.

South Carolina, for example, remains the only state where the force or violence used or threatened must be of a higher level (force or violence must be of a "high and aggravated nature" – see section below Current State laws).

A similar law existed in Tennessee until 2005, when it was repealed. The law stated that a person could be guilty of the rape of a spouse at a time they are living together only if that person either "was armed with a weapon or any article used or fashioned in a manner to lead the alleged victim to reasonably believe it to be a weapon" or "caused serious bodily injury to the alleged victim". This meant that, in practice, most cases of marital rape could not be prosecuted, since few rapes involve such extreme circumstances. The law was finally repealed in 2005, allowing for marital rape to be treated like any other type of rape. The bill to repeal the old law was introduced more than ten times before it succeeded.

Until 2013, Washington had an exemption preventing a spouse from being prosecuted with third-degree-rape against the other spouse. Washington removed its exemptions for first-degree rape and second-degree rape in 1983, but the exemption for third-degree rape was removed 30 years later.

Until July 2019, in Minnesota sexual violence occurring between spouses at the time they cohabit or between unmarried partners could be prosecuted only if there was force or threat thereof, due to exemptions created by Article 609.349 'Voluntary relationships' which stipulated that certain sexual offenses do not apply to spouses (unless they are separated), and neither do they apply to unmarried cohabitants. These are offenses that deal with situations where the lack of consent is due to the incapacity of consent of the victim, including where the victim was drugged by the perpetrator. These situations, which were excluded from prosecution, are where the victim was "mentally impaired, mentally incapacitated, or physically helpless". The term "mentally incapacitated" is defined as a person who "under the influence of alcohol, a narcotic, anesthetic, or any other substance, administered to that person without the person's agreement, lacks the judgment to give a reasoned consent to sexual contact or sexual penetration" (see Article 609.341 for definitions). In 2019, these exemptions were repealed.

A 2003 study found that "twenty-four states and the District of Columbia have abolished marital immunity for sexual offenses ... twenty-six states retain marital immunity in one form or another". Since 2003, several states have reformed their laws (see above).

== Current status ==
Some states continue to treat marital and non-marital rape differently:

=== California ===
In California, marital rape was recognized as a crime by Section 262 of California's Penal Code in 1979. However, there are separate criminal offenses for non-spousal rape (Section 261) and for spousal rape (Section 262); the latter was treated as a less serious crime until the enactment of 2021 California Assembly Bill 1171. Prior to the enactment of that bill, sexual intercourse with one's spouse without their consent was not recognized as a crime. Section 262 required that, if spouse A did not want to have sex, they needed to resist the forceful sexual advances of spouse B, unless A was "prevented from resisting by any controlled substance", or "incapable of resisting" because A was unconscious or asleep, unaware of the sexual act occurring, or deceived by "the perpetrator's fraud in fact", in which cases the sexual act would have amounted to rape.

Having sex with someone other than one's spouse without their consent was recognized as a different crime. However, Section 261 indicated that this only applied if the victim was "incapable [of giving legal consent] because of a mental disorder or developmental or physical disability". Otherwise, the victim was required to resist the forceful sexual advances of the perpetrator, unless the victim was "prevented from resisting by any controlled substance", or "incapable of resisting" because A was unconscious or asleep, unaware of the sexual act occurring, or deceived by "the perpetrator's fraud in fact" or "the perpetrator's fraudulent representation that the sexual penetration served a professional purpose when it served no professional purpose", in which cases the sexual act would have amounted to rape.

Since January 1, 2019, Penal Code Section 261.6 defines "consent" as "positive cooperation in act or attitude pursuant to an exercise of free will. The person must act freely and voluntarily and have knowledge of the nature of the act or transaction involved". Sections 261.6 and 261.7 stipulate that, wherever "consent is at issue", "a current or previous dating or marital relationship shall not be sufficient to constitute consent", neither is "evidence that the victim suggested, requested, or otherwise communicated to the defendant that the defendant use a condom or other birth control device".

October 7, 2021, Governor Gavin Newsom signed 2021 Assembly Bill 1171 into law, eliminating section 262 of the California Penal Code. AB-1171 repealed the provisions relating to spousal rape and made conforming changes, thereby making an act of sexual intercourse accomplished with a spouse punishable as rape if the act otherwise meets the definition of rape, except that sexual intercourse with a person who is "incapable of giving legal consent because of mental disorder or developmental or physical disability" is not rape if the 2 people are married.

=== Connecticut ===
Connecticut Penal Code Sec. 53a-70b deals with forced sex with a spouse. This does not apply only to spouses but also to unmarried cohabitants. The law is more narrow than the other sex laws and it has a shorter penalty. It reads:

No spouse or cohabitor shall compel the other spouse or cohabitor to engage in sexual intercourse by the use of force against such other spouse or cohabitor, or by the threat of the use of force against such other spouse or cohabitor which reasonably causes such other spouse or cohabitor to fear physical injury.

The spousal rape law of Connecticut makes reference to force used or threatened against the "other spouse or cohabitor" while the 'ordinary' sexual assault law deals with force used or threatened against the "other person or against a third person".

=== Idaho ===
Idaho statute 18-6101 defines criminal rape, not excluding marital rape, as the oral, vaginal, or anal penetration by a penis and either the inability of the victim to give legal consent, the victim resisting but being overcome by force or violence, the victim being prevented from resisting, the victim being unconscious, or when the victim submits under certain false pretenses.

=== Maryland ===
Previously, Maryland law stated in Sec. 3-318 that, if the spouses are living together, a prosecution can take place only if the accused "uses force or threat of force and the act is without the consent of the spouse". This changed with the passing of Senate Bill 129 in 2023, which removed the "spousal defense" described in Sec. 3-318 entirely.

=== Michigan ===
In Michigan, a person can be convicted of all degrees of criminal sexual conduct even if the victim is their spouse. According to Section 750.520l, criminal sexual conduct may not be convicted if the criminality comes solely due to the spouse being "mentally incapable". Section 750.520a states that "'Mentally incapable' means that a person suffers from a mental disease or defect that renders that person temporarily or permanently incapable of appraising the nature of his or her conduct."

=== Mississippi ===
In Mississippi, a person can be convicted of sexual battery of a spouse when they are living together only if he engages in "forcible penetration against the victim's will". This excludes, among others, situations where the victim is "rendered incapable of knowing or controlling his or her conduct, or incapable of resisting an act due to the influence of any drug, narcotic, anesthetic, or other substance administered to that person without his or her consent".

=== Nevada ===
Nevada law appears to require force or threat of force. Article 200.373 states that: "It is no defense to a charge of sexual assault that the perpetrator was, at the time of the assault, married to the victim, if the assault was committed by force or by the threat of force." This seems to imply that if force or threat of thereof were not used, marriage can be a defense. The general definition of sexual assault uses the wording "against the will of the victim" or "under conditions in which the perpetrator knows or should know that the victim is mentally or physically incapable of resisting or understanding the nature of his or her conduct".

=== Ohio ===
In Ohio, a rape that happens in marriage when the spouses are living together can only be charged under subsection A(2) of 2907.02 Rape, which states that: "No person shall engage in sexual conduct with another when the offender purposely compels the other person to submit by force or threat of force." By contrast, a person who is not married to the accused or who is married but living separate and apart can rely on many laws which deal with various forms of coercion. It is notable that subsection A(1)(a) of 2907.02 Rape that deals with drugging someone "surreptitiously or by force, threat of force, or deception" to coerce them into sex does not apply in marriage (except in case of separation). The whole article 2907.03 Sexual battery, that deals with various forms of coercion (for instance it states in subsection in A (1) that "The offender [commits a crime when he] knowingly coerces the other person to submit by any means that would prevent resistance by a person of ordinary resolution") does not apply at all to married people. In 2015, a bill was introduced to remove these exemptions. In 2024, Governor Mike DeWine signed into law a bill, passed by the General Assembly, that banned all forms of spousal rape.

=== Oklahoma ===
In Oklahoma, rape by a spouse was previously defined under subsection (B) of Section 1111 – Rape Defined which stated:

B. Rape is an act of sexual intercourse accomplished with a male or female who is the spouse of the perpetrator if force or violence is used or threatened, accompanied by apparent power of execution to the victim or to another person.

However, as of the most current revision of the section, this law no longer applies and reads as such:

A. Rape is an act of sexual intercourse involving vaginal or anal penetration accomplished with a male or female within or without the bonds of matrimony who may be of the same or the opposite sex as the perpetrator under any of the following circumstances:

As of Jan 2024, spousal rape is currently a criminal offense in Oklahoma. Oklahoma spousal rape laws protect individuals from unwanted sexual advances or abusive situations involving sex. By outlining spousal rape in addition to rape in general, the laws make it clear that marriage is not a contract for sex whenever a spouse wants.

=== Rhode Island ===
In Rhode Island, Article § 11-37-2 "First degree sexual assault", has four subsections; while subsections 2, 3 and 4 apply to spouses, subsection 1 does not; it reads: "The accused, not being the spouse, knows or has reason to know that the victim is mentally incapacitated, mentally disabled, or physically helpless." This has the result of excluding from prosecution, among other situations, incidents where the victim was drugged by the perpetrator. ("Mentally incapacitated" is defined by legislation as: "a person who is rendered temporarily incapable of appraising or controlling his or her conduct due to the influence of a narcotic, anesthetic, or other substance administered to that person without his or her consent, or who is mentally unable to communicate unwillingness to engage in the act".)

=== South Carolina ===
South Carolina's statute on "Assault and Criminal Sexual Conduct" (Title 16, Chapter 3, Article 7 of the SC Code of Laws) lays out distinctively different definitions and penalties between rape by a spouse and by other parties. First and second degree sexual assault carries a maximum prison sentence of 30 and 20 years, respectively, while 10 years is the maximum sentence for marital rape. In order to prosecute, the married victim must report the rape within 30 days, even if they are living separately from their spouse.

South Carolina Code 16-3-615, titled Spousal sexual battery, reads:

Sexual battery, as defined in Section 16-3-651(h), when accomplished through use of aggravated force, defined as the use or the threat of use of a weapon or the use or threat of use of physical force or physical violence of a high and aggravated nature, by one spouse against the other spouse if they are living together, constitutes the felony of spousal sexual battery and, upon conviction, a person must be imprisoned not more than ten years.

This definition does not include all types of force under first degree sexual assault definitions, such as rape combined with felony acts – like forcible confinement, kidnapping, trafficking in persons, or extortion – or cases where the married victim was drugged by their rapist.

In the case of criminal sexual conduct when the victim and perpetrator are married but do not live together as a married couple, first and second degree forms of sexual assault are included in the definition of rape, but not third degree forms. So, for example, drugging and raping a spouse from whom you are separated is against the law, but if they are unable to give consent because of substances they took themselves or were given by a third party, having sex with them is not legally defined as rape.

=== Virginia ===
In Virginia, the main difference lies in punishment. Under certain circumstances, if the victim and the attorney for the Commonwealth agree, the perpetrator can undergo a therapy program, which if completed successfully, replaces any punishment. This can happen if "the court finds such action will promote maintenance of the family unit and be in the best interest of the complaining witness".

== Marriageable age and age of consent ==
Child and forced marriage in the United States have come to increased scrutiny in recent years. Although the general marriage age is 18 in most of the United States, 40 states allow marriage under the age of 18 with parental and/or court consent. Such exceptions can create conflicts between age of consent laws and the marriage age, with most statutory rape laws creating exceptions for minors engaged in a sexual relationship with their lawful spouse – although such minors would otherwise not be able to legally consent to sex. Delaware, New Jersey, Pennsylvania, Minnesota, Rhode Island, and New York have enacted legislation to ban all marriage for minors under the age of 18, without exceptions.

In Iowa, for example, subsection (2) of article 709.4 Sexual abuse in third degree, excludes sexual acts committed by adults with children as young as 12, provided the parties are "cohabiting as husband and wife." This does not refer only to legal marriages, but can apply to common law marriage as well. Iowa is also one of 10 states, and the District of Columbia, which recognizes common law marriage, though it does also require, "substantial evidence of a present intent and agreement to be married, continuous cohabitation, and a public declaration that the parties are husband and wife."

In 2012, a man who got his 13-year-old live-in girlfriend pregnant tried to rely on this law. The man, who was of Mexican origin, argued that according to the norms as they exist in his culture, their relationship was "sort of like a trial marriage." The court rejected this argument, ruling that the exemption could be used only if the couple "objectively cohabited in the status of husband and wife, whether common law or otherwise," not if they merely believed they did.
