= Bill Bloom (Nebraska politician) =

American politician (1928–1986)

Member of the Nebraska Legislature from the 20th district
- In office January 3, 1967 – January 5, 1971
- Preceded by: William M. Wylie (redistricted)
- Succeeded by: Glenn Goodrich

Personal details
- Born: May 2, 1928 Omaha, Nebraska
- Died: April 14, 1986 (aged 57) Omaha, Nebraska
- Party: Democratic
- Spouse: Joy (m. 1959)
- Children: 3 (James, Steven, John)
- Occupation: Police officer

Bill K. Bloom (May 2, 1928 – April 14, 1986) was a Democratic politician from Nebraska who served as a member of the Nebraska Legislature from the 20th district from 1967 to 1971.

== Early life ==
Bloom was born in Omaha, Nebraska, in 1959, and graduated from Omaha Technical High School. He attended a business college for a year, and began working as a police officer in the Omaha Police Department. Bloom was one of the founding members of the Omaha Police Credit Union, and served as the treasurer-manager of the organization. He worked as a representative of several local government employee unions, including as the business representative of the Omaha Police Union from 1961 to 1974, and as a representative of the City Civilian Employees Union.

== Nebraska Legislature ==
In 1966, following redistricting, Bloom ran for the state legislature from the newly created 20th district, which was based in Omaha. He ran in a crowded primary that included businessman George Bischof, perennial candidate Robert Dixon, Western Electric employee James Domonkos, real estate development Glenn Goodrich, bar owner William Growney, and trucker Edward Shada. Bloom placed second in the primary, receiving 22 percent of the vote to Goodrich's 28 percent, and they advanced to the general election. Bloom, a registered Democrat, was endorsed in the race over Goodrich by the Douglas County Democratic Party, and narrowly won, receiving 52 percent of the vote to Goodrich's 48 percent.

Bloom ran for a second term in 1970, and was challenged for re-election by Goodrich, insurance investigator Joe Manto, and bond broker Dale Whitesel. Bloom placed first in the primary by a wide margin, receiving 46 percent of the vote to Goodrich's 25 percent. The general election between Bloom and Goodrich was contentious, with Goodrich arguing that Bloom was "serv[ing] two masters" when serving as a legislator and simultaneously representing the police union.

The original count of the votes showed Goodrich defeating Bloom by nineteen votes, and Bloom requested a recount. During the recount, Goodrich gained 88 votes and Bloom gained only 64, including in one precinct in which 54 uncounted votes for Goodrich were discovered during the canvass, which expanded Goodrich's overall lead to 43 votes.
