= Oregon v. Rideout =

1978 US marital rape case

Oregon v. Rideout was a trial held in Marion County Circuit Court in 1978 in Salem, Oregon. John Rideout was accused of raping his wife, Greta Rideout, the first man in the United States to be charged with raping his wife while they were still living together. The trial was the first in Oregon relating to marital rape since the state revised its rape law in 1977 to eliminate the marital rape immunity. Following a jury trial, John Rideout was acquitted.

== Background ==
In 1977, Oregon passed a law removing marriage or cohabitation as a legal defense to a charge of rape. In 1978, Greta Rideout brought a charge of rape against her husband under the 1977 law. The alleged assault according to Greta Rideout occurred October 10, 1978, at their apartment in North Salem. Having been arguing recently and facing threats of violence from John, she had refused to have sex with him and attempted to leave the house. He then brought her back to the apartment and raped her. When she tried to report this to the police, she was told according to Oregon law she had to wait two days to make a rape charge. He was then arrested a week later and the trial began two months after that on December 19, 1978. John became the first man in the United States to be charged with raping his wife while he was still living with her. There were other cases of marital rape charges brought before the courts in the United States prior to this, but they did not involve couples who had been cohabitating.

== Trial ==
Charles Burt represented the husband, John Rideout, while the prosecution was represented by Marion County District Attorney Gary Gortmaker. Burt is quoted saying, "A woman who’s still in a marriage is presumably consenting to sex…Maybe this is the risk of being married, you know?...If this law's interpretation isn’t corrected it will bring a flock of rape cases under very bad circumstances…The remedy is to get out of the marital situation." He was found not guilty by a unanimous jury composed of eight women and four men on December 27, 1978.

== Aftermath ==
Even though the verdict in this case was reached very quickly, the case itself stirred up public and governmental interest on the issue of marital rape and social rules about sex between husbands and wives. It also continued conversations on behalf of activists and government representatives on whether or not other states should pass similar laws allowing wives to charge husbands with rape. As marital rape exemption clauses were removed from state rules for prosecution during the 1970s and 1980s, more cases were brought to the courts. However, by 1987, only twelve states had laws allowing wives to charge their husbands with rape without considerations of legal separation or cohabitation. By 1993 marital rape was a crime in all 50 U.S. states.

The case was turned into a made for TV movie in 1980.

John Rideout was again prosecuted for rape in 2016 almost 40 years after his acquittal from the rape of Greta Rideout. These were two different accusations of rape going back to 2013. One by a woman who had hired John Rideout to do handyman work and another by his cohabitating girlfriend at the time. He was convicted of the rapes in 2017 and sentenced to two 100-month sentences.
