= Jim Jensen (Nebraska politician) =

American politician (1934–2023)

Jim Jensen (January 17, 1934 – October 11, 2023) was an American politician who served as a member of the Nebraska Legislature from 1994 to 2006.

== Life and career ==
Jim Jensen was born in Omaha, Nebraska on January 17, 1934. He graduated from a technical high school in Omaha. Jensen served as a second lieutenant in the U.S. National Guard from 1952 to 1961. He was a board member First Westroads Bank, Metropolitan Omaha Builders Association, and PRIDE Omaha, on the board of directors for Grace University and the chairman of Electronic Benefit Transfer Task Force and past chairman of Omaha zoning board of appeals. He has five children and 16 grandchildren and has had a real estate broker's license since 1963.

Jensen was elected in 1994 to represent the 20th Nebraska legislative district and reelected in 1998 and 2002. He sat on the Banking, Commerce and Insurance, Building Maintenance committees as well as the Committee on Committees and chairperson of the Health and Human Services committee and the Behavioral Health Oversight Commission. Since Nebraska voters passed Initiative Measure 415 in 2001 limiting state senators to two terms after 2001, he was unable to run for reelection in 2006.

Jensen died on October 11, 2023, at the age of 89.

Preceded by Jessie Rasmussen	Nebraska state senator-district 20; 1994–2006	Succeeded by Brad Ashford
