= Nebraska Department of Revenue =

Nebraska state agency

Agency overview
- Headquarters: State Office Building 301 Centennial Mall, South Lincoln, Nebraska, U.S.; 40°48′39.024″N 96°42′1.62″W
- Agency executive: Jim Kamm, Tax Commissioner
- Website: Official website

The Nebraska Department of Revenue is an agency of the Nebraska state government responsible for the administration of state revenue and tax programs. The Nebraska Constitution prohibits use of a property tax, thus most revenue is collected from a state sales tax, use taxes, and a state income tax. The department also oversees the Nebraska Lottery and "Charitable Gaming".

The department headquarters are located at the State Office Building in Lincoln, Nebraska. The current tax commissioner of Nebraska is James R. Kamm. The tax commissioner of Nebraska is also the director of the Nebraska Department of Revenue.

== Tax commissioners ==
The office of state tax commissioner was established by an amendment to the Constitution of Nebraska in 1920. The state tax commissioner is appointed by the Governor of Nebraska, with the consent of the Nebraska Legislature.

#	Commissioner	Took office	Left office	Appointing Governor	Notes
1	William H. Osborne Jr.	1920	Apr. 19, 1923	Samuel Roy McKelvie	Often referred to as W. H. Osborne
2	William H. Smith	Apr. 19, 1923	Jan. 13, 1925	Charles W. Bryan	Previously served as Nebraska State Auditor from 1915 to 1919
3	Thomas E. Williams	Jan. 13, 1925	Jan. 8, 1929	Adam McMullen	
4	Harry W. Scott	Jan. 8, 1929	Dec. 1, 1930	Arthur J. Weaver	
–	Maude Butler	Dec. 1, 1930	Jan. 8, 1931	None	Interim tax commissioner
(2)	William H. Smith	Jan. 8, 1931	Jan. 10, 1941	Charles W. Bryan	Served previously as the second tax commissioner during Bryan's previous term
(2)	William H. Smith	Jan. 8, 1931	Jan. 10, 1941	Roy Cochran	Served previously as the second tax commissioner during Bryan's previous term
5	Frank J. Brady	Jan. 10, 1941	Apr. 12, 1943	Dwight Griswold	
6	Robert M. Armstrong	Apr. 12, 1943	Sept. 1, 1948	Dwight Griswold	
7	Philip K. Johnson	Sept. 1, 1948	Feb. 1, 1953	Val Peterson	
8	Norris J. Anderson	Feb. 1, 1953	Nov. 1, 1953	Robert B. Crosby	
9	George W. Peterson	Nov. 1, 1953	1955	Robert B. Crosby	
10	Fred A. Herrington	1955	Dec. 15, 1959	Victor Anderson	
11	Forrest A. Johnson	Dec. 15, 1959	Nov. 30, 1964	Ralph G. Brooks	Former FBI agent and former mayor of Fremont, Nebraska
12	George J. Dworak	Nov. 30, 1964	Jan. 15, 1967	Frank B. Morrison	
13	Murrell B. McNeil	Jan. 15, 1967	1971	Norbert Tiemann	Initially served as acting tax commissioner from January 15 to April 1, 1967
14	William E. Peters	1971	Dec. 29, 1978	J. James Exon	
–	Gary Chunka	Dec. 29, 1978	Jan. 17, 1979	None	Acting tax commissioner
(10)	Fred A. Herrington	Jan. 17, 1979	Nov. 13, 1981	Charles Thone	Initially served as acting tax commissioner from January 17 to February 21, 1979; Previously served as tax commissioner under Governor Victor Anderson.
15	Donald S. Leuenberger	Nov. 13, 1981	1983	Charles Thone	
16	Donna Karnes	1983	1987	Bob Kerrey	
(15)	Donald S. Leuenberger	1987	May 1, 1988	Kay Orr	Previously served as tax commissioner under Governor Charles Thone
17	John M. Boehm	May 1, 1988	1991	Kay Orr	
18	Mucho Berri Balka	1991	1999	Ben Nelson	
19	Mary Jane Egr Edson	1999	2006	Mike Johanns	
20	Douglas A. Ewald	2006	Oct. 19, 2013	Dave Heineman	
21	Kim Conroy	Oct. 19, 2013	2015	Dave Heineman	
–	Leonard J. Sloup	2015	2016	None	Acting tax commissioner
22	Tony Fulton	2016	Dec. 30, 2022	Pete Ricketts	Former Nebraska state senator from District 29
–	Glen A. White	Dec. 30, 2022	Sept. 5, 2023	None	Interim tax commissioner
23	Jim Kamm	Sept. 5, 2023	Present	Jim Pillen	

== See also ==
- Nebraska Lottery
