= 1958 Nebraska lieutenant gubernatorial election =

- November 4, 1958
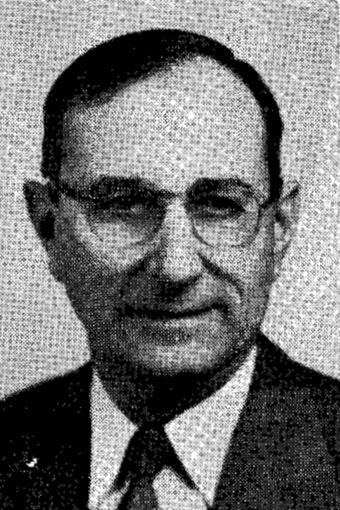

Nominee	Dwight Burney	Frank Sorrell
Party	Republican	Democratic
Popular vote	202,295	197,849
Percentage	50.6%	49.4%
- County results Burney: 50–60% 60–70% Sorrell: 50–60% 60–70%
Lieutenant Governor before election
Dwight Burney
Republican
Elected Lieutenant Governor
Dwight Burney
Republican

The 1958 Nebraska lieutenant gubernatorial election was held on November 4, 1958, and featured incumbent Nebraska Lieutenant Governor Dwight Burney, a Republican, defeating Democratic nominee Frank Sorrell.

On September 9, 1960, Nebraska Governor Ralph G. Brooks died while in office. This caused Dwight Burney, who as a result of this election was the lieutenant governor, to become Governor of Nebraska.

== Democratic primary ==
=== Candidates ===
- Earl V. Baker
- Dr. William W. Jurgensen, radiologist from Omaha, Nebraska
- Frank Sorrell, Democratic nominee for Governor of Nebraska in 1956, 1948, and 1946 and former member of the Nebraska Legislature from District 2

=== Results ===
Democratic primary results
Party	Candidate	Votes	%
Democratic	Frank Sorrell	38,966	58.91
Democratic	William W. Jurgensen	15,004	22.68
Democratic	Earl V. Baker	12,174	18.40
Scattering		2	

== Republican primary ==
=== Candidates ===
- Dwight Burney, incumbent Nebraska Lieutenant Governor
- Marvin Griswold, businessman from Lincoln, Nebraska

=== Results ===
Republican primary results
Party	Candidate	Votes	%
Republican	Dwight Burney (incumbent)	53,520	50.27
Republican	Marvin Griswold	52,945	49.73
Scattering		8	

== General election ==
=== Results ===
Nebraska lieutenant gubernatorial election, 1958
Party	Candidate	Votes	%
Republican	Dwight Burney (incumbent)	202,295	50.56
Democratic	Frank Sorrell	197,849	49.44
Scattering		1	
Total votes		400,145	100.00
Republican hold			

== See also ==
- 1958 Nebraska gubernatorial election
