= 1964 Nebraska lieutenant gubernatorial election =

- November 3, 1964
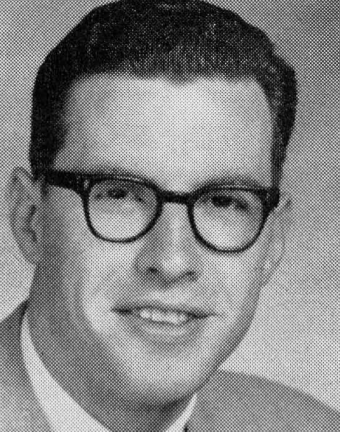

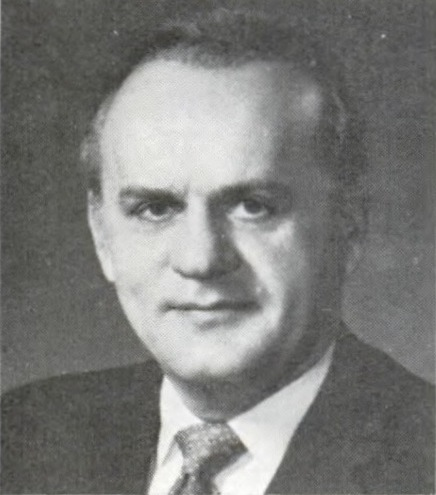
Nominee	Philip Sorensen	Charles Thone
Party	Democratic	Republican
Popular vote	285,033	276,688
Percentage	50.7%	49.3%
- County results Sorensen: 50–60% 60–70% Thone: 50–60% 60–70% 70–80%
Lieutenant Governor before election
Dwight Burney
Republican
Elected Lieutenant Governor
Philip Sorensen
Democratic

The 1964 Nebraska lieutenant gubernatorial election was held on November 3, 1964, and featured 31-year-old Philip Sorensen, a Democrat, defeating Republican nominee Charles Thone. Incumbent lieutenant governor Dwight Burney decided to run for Governor of Nebraska and thus did not run for reelection as lieutenant governor.

== Democratic primary ==
=== Candidates ===
- Hazeldeane Carpenter, wife of Terry Carpenter
- George E. Cornwell
- William H. Diers, former Speaker of the Nebraska Legislature and former member of the Nebraska Legislature from District 24
- Robert A. Dixon
- Edward A. Dosek, insurance agent from Lincoln, Nebraska, who ran for lieutenant governor in 1960 but withdrew two months before the election.
- Richard R. Larsen, former Nebraska State Treasurer
- L. Clark McCabe
- Philip Sorensen, son of former Nebraska Attorney General Christian A. Sorensen

=== Results ===
Democratic primary results
Party	Candidate	Votes	%
Democratic	Philip Sorensen	31,107	35.11
Democratic	Hazeldeane Carpenter	18,536	20.92
Democratic	Richard R. Larsen	12,008	13.55
Democratic	Edward A. Dosek	7,885	8.90
Democratic	L. Clark McCabe	7,094	8.01
Democratic	George E. Cornwell	4,379	4.94
Democratic	William H. Diers	3,867	4.36
Democratic	Robert A. Dixon	3,583	4.04
Scattering		137	

== Republican primary ==
=== Candidates ===
- Wesley C. Becker
- Herman J. Dinges
- John Everroad
- Del Lienemann, accountant
- Donald L. Thompson, member of the Nebraska Legislature from District 38
- Charles Thone, administrative assistant to U.S. Senator Roman Hruska
- Willard H. Waldo, former member of the Nebraska Legislature from District 30

=== Results ===
Republican primary results
Party	Candidate	Votes	%
Republican	Charles Thone	55,095	40.70
Republican	John Everroad	29,075	21.48
Republican	Donald L. Thompson	18,931	13.98
Republican	Willard H. Waldo	15,960	11.79
Republican	Del Lienemann	7,938	5.86
Republican	Wesley C. Becker	6,540	4.83
Republican	Herman J. Dinges	1,731	1.28
Scattering		106	

== General election ==
=== Results ===
Nebraska lieutenant gubernatorial election, 1964
Party	Candidate	Votes	%
Democratic	Philip Sorensen	285,033	50.74
Republican	Charles Thone	276,688	49.26
Scattering		19	
Total votes		561,740	100.00
Democratic gain from Republican			

== See also ==
- 1964 Nebraska gubernatorial election
