= Frank Sorrell =

American Democratic party politician

Member of the Nebraska Legislature from the 2nd district
- In office January 3, 1939 – January 7, 1947
- Preceded by: Robert M. Armstrong
- Succeeded by: John McKnight

Personal details
- Born: June 22, 1894 Canaan Township, Gasconade County, Missouri, U.S.
- Died: August 20, 1964 (aged 70) Syracuse, Nebraska, U.S.
- Party: Democratic

James Franklin "Frank" Sorrell (June 22, 1894 – August 20, 1964) was an American Democratic party politician, businessman, and public servant. He served in the unicameral Nebraska Legislature from 1939 to 1947. He also ran unsuccessfully three times for Governor of Nebraska and once for Nebraska Lieutenant Governor.

== Early life ==
Sorrell was born on June 22, 1894, to Chalmer and Mary Sorrell in Canaan Township, Gasconade County, Missouri. In 1914 at age 20, he came to Nebraska and farmed in Otoe County. After farming for about 15 years, Sorrell became an insurance agent, auctioneer, and realtor.

== Career ==
Sorrell first ran for political office in 1938 when he sought to represent the second legislative district in the Nebraska Legislature. He was successful at winning the seat, ousting the incumbent, Robert M. Armstrong, by over 1,000 votes. Sorrell was then reelected to the Nebraska Legislature three times, serving eight years in total from 1939 to 1947.

In 1946, after Nebraska Governor Dwight Griswold decided to run for US Senate, Sorrell sought the governorship of Nebraska. He won the Democratic primary but lost the general election to Val Peterson. Sorrell challenged Peterson again in 1948 to be Nebraska governor after winning an uncontested primary but lost again.

Sorrell tried once again to run for governor of Nebraska by attempting to unseat Republican incumbent governor Victor Anderson in the 1956 Nebraska gubernatorial election but lost once again, though he captured the highest vote share of any of his three campaigns for governor. In 1958, Sorrell sought the office of Nebraska Lieutenant Governor, running against incumbent lieutenant governor Dwight Burney. Although the race was very close, Sorrell was ultimately unsuccessful in this race as well. Since Ralph G. Brooks defeated Anderson for governor in the election of 1958, some speculated that if Sorrell had run for governor, he may have been elected. Furthermore, if he had been successful in winning the lieutenant governorship, he would have also become governor due to the death of Brooks before the expiration of his term.

In 1959, Democratic Nebraska governor Ralph G. Brooks appointed Sorrell to the Nebraska Liquor Control Commission, but Nebraska governor Frank B. Morrison fired Sorrell from the commission in 1962 due to an allegation that Sorrell had violated state law in acting on behalf of two liquor licensees who came before the commission. Sorrell fought his dismissal but was ultimately ordered by a court to vacate the office.

In 1964, Sorrell once again sought a seat in the Nebraska Legislature. He advanced to the general election after winning one of the top two spots in the primary, but he died just over two months before the general election.

== Personal life ==
Sorrell married Oma E. Sewell in 1915, and they had three children. She died in 1943. He later married Emma Mae Craven, who died in 1963.

Sorrell died at age 70 of a heart attack after sweeping the stage of a band shell at the Otoe County Fair.
