= William Diers =

American Democratic party politician

2nd Speaker of the Nebraska Legislature
- In office 1939–1940
- Preceded by: Charles J. Warner
- Succeeded by: Rufus M. Howard

Member of the Nebraska Legislature from the 24th district
- In office 1937–1941
- Preceded by: Office created
- Succeeded by: Stanley A. Matzke

Member of the Nebraska House of Representatives
- In office 1933–1937

Personal details
- Born: May 27, 1890 Ulysses, Nebraska, U.S.
- Died: May 2, 1982 (aged 91) Lincoln, Nebraska, U.S.
- Party: Democratic

William Henry Diers (born Ulysses, Nebraska, May 27, 1890; died Lincoln, Nebraska, May 2, 1982) was an American Democratic party politician, businessman, and public servant. He served as Speaker of the unicameral Nebraska Legislature in 1939.

== Family ==
Diers was the son of Martha (Barnes) Diers (1862–1931) and Herman Diers (1860–1926), a banker and general store owner from Gresham, Nebraska. Herman Diers served in the Nebraska House of Representatives from 1901 to 1903 and the Nebraska Senate from 1909 to 1911. William Diers' younger brother Herbert Kenneth Diers (1896–1975) served five terms in the unicameral Nebraska Legislature (1951–1957, 1959–1963). William Diers graduated from York High School in York, Nebraska, and attended the University of Nebraska from 1909 to 1911. He and his brother continued to operate the family store following their father's death in 1926.

== Career ==
A Democrat, Diers was elected to the Nebraska House in 1933 and 1935. Thereafter, the Nebraska Legislature was changed to a unicameral body, and Diers was elected to it in 1936 and 1938. In the 1939 session, he was elected Speaker.

In 1940 Diers ran for lieutenant governor of Nebraska. He won a narrowly divided, five-way Democratic party primary with 23.85% of the vote but was defeated in the general election by Republican William E. Johnson. He then went to work as a lobbyist.

In 1947 Diers was appointed by Republican governor Val Peterson to the State Board of Control, which operated the state's prisons and mental hospitals. The three members of the board had just resigned due to a scandal, and Peterson selected Diers over the candidate proposed by the Democratic state committee, Frank Sorrell, Peterson's opponent in the 1946 gubernatorial election. Diers was elected vice chairman and later chairman. He served on the board until 1955.

Diers was a candidate for lieutenant governor again in 1964 and received 4.36% of the vote in a crowded Democratic primary.

== Personal life ==
Diers married Marjorie Berryhill (1893–1990) on November 29, 1916; they had two children. Diers and his wife are buried in Cedar Lawn Cemetery in Gresham.
