= 1948 Nebraska lieutenant gubernatorial election =

- November 2, 1948
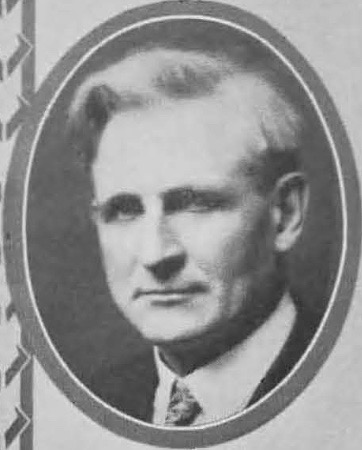

Nominee	Charles J. Warner	Sam J. Howell
Party	Republican	Democratic
Popular vote	269,987	172,583
Percentage	61.0%	39.0%
Lieutenant Governor before election
Robert B. Crosby
Republican
Elected Lieutenant Governor
Charles J. Warner
Republican

The 1948 Nebraska lieutenant gubernatorial election was held on November 2, 1948, and featured former Speaker of the Nebraska Legislature Charles J. Warner, a Republican, defeating Democratic nominee Sam J. Howell.

== Democratic primary ==
=== Candidates ===
Sam J. Howell ran unopposed in the Democratic primary. He was an insurance agent from Omaha, Nebraska, who had served in the Nebraska State Senate from 1935 to 1937 and as the chairman of the Omaha Housing Authority.

=== Results ===
Democratic primary results
Party	Candidate	Votes	%
Democratic	Sam J. Howell	64,286	99.99
Scattering		4	

== Republican primary ==
=== Candidates ===
- Arthur J. Denney, former county attorney for Jefferson County, Nebraska, former city attorney for Fairbury, Nebraska, and unsuccessful Republican nominee for United States House of Representatives in 1936
- William Keeshan, former county attorney for Boone County, Nebraska, and president of the Nebraska County Attorneys Association (withdrew before the primaries)
- Charles J. Warner, first Speaker of the Nebraska Unicameral Legislature and former member of the Nebraska Legislature from what was then District 18 for over 20 years

=== Results ===
Republican primary results
Party	Candidate	Votes	%
Republican	Charles J. Warner	101,035	68.20
Republican	Arthur J. Denney	47,109	31.80
Scattering		6	

== General election ==
=== Results ===
Nebraska lieutenant gubernatorial election, 1948
Party	Candidate	Votes	%
Republican	Charles J. Warner	269,987	61.00
Democratic	Sam J. Howell	172,583	39.00
Scattering		1	
Total votes		442,571	100.00
Republican hold			

== See also ==
- 1948 Nebraska gubernatorial election
