= 1956 Nebraska lieutenant gubernatorial election =

- November 6, 1956
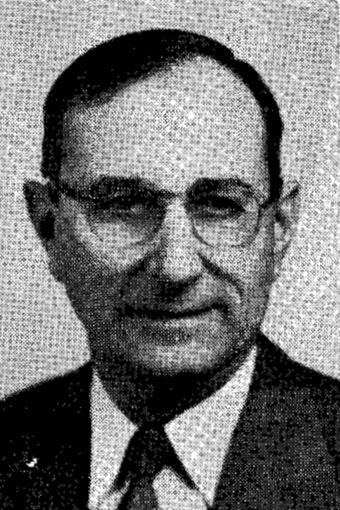

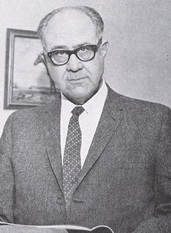
Nominee	Dwight Burney	Frank B. Morrison
Party	Republican	Democratic
Popular vote	292,135	243,639
Percentage	54.5%	45.5%
Lieutenant Governor before election
Charles J. Warner
(died Sept. 24, 1955)
Republican
Elected Lieutenant Governor
Dwight Burney
Republican

The 1956 Nebraska lieutenant gubernatorial election was held on November 6, 1956, and featured Speaker of the Nebraska Legislature Dwight Burney, a Republican, defeating Democratic nominee Frank B. Morrison who had been chosen to replace original Democratic nominee Stanley D. Long who had died during the campaign.

The previous incumbent lieutenant governor, Charles J. Warner, died on September 24, 1955, and thus the office of Nebraska Lieutenant Governor had been vacant for over a year when this election was held. Under the Nebraska Constitution, Article IV, Section 18, this vacancy meant that Dwight Burney, as Speaker of the Nebraska Legislature from 1955 to 1956, was already second in line to become Governor of Nebraska before he was elected lieutenant governor in this election.

Eight years after this election, the 1964 Nebraska gubernatorial election would also feature Dwight Burney as the Republican nominee facing Frank B. Morrison as the Democratic nominee, though in that election Morrison defeated Burney to become Governor of Nebraska.

== Democratic primary ==
=== Candidates ===
- Harry Andreasen
- George E. Cornwell
- Stanley D. Long, realtor and pharmacist who served from 1927 to 1951 on the University of Nebraska Board of Regents and was the Democratic nominee for lieutenant governor in 1954

=== Results ===
Democratic primary results
Party	Candidate	Votes	%
Democratic	Stanley D. Long	25,883	44.66
Democratic	Harry Andreasen	18,923	32.65
Democratic	George E. Cornwell	13,141	22.67
Scattering		9	

== Republican primary ==
=== Candidates ===
- Dwight Burney, Speaker of the Nebraska Legislature and member of the Nebraska Legislature from what was then District 14.
- Marvin Griswold, businessman from Lincoln, Nebraska
- Ernest M. Johnson
- Carl G. Swanson

=== Results ===
Republican primary results
Party	Candidate	Votes	%
Republican	Dwight Burney	29,760	31.07
Republican	Carl G. Swanson	29,335	30.63
Republican	Marvin Griswold	24,297	25.37
Republican	Ernest M. Johnson	12,390	12.94
Scattering		2	

== General election ==
On May 15, 1956, Stanley D. Long, who had been the Democratic nominee for lieutenant governor in 1954, won the Democratic primary to again become the Democratic nominee for lieutenant governor in 1956. However, on October 6, 1956, just one month before the election, Stanley D. Long died. On October 13, 1956, the Nebraska Democratic Central Committee selected Frank B. Morrison, former Democratic candidate for the U.S. House of Representatives in 1948 and 1954, to replace him.

=== Results ===
Nebraska lieutenant gubernatorial election, 1956
Party	Candidate	Votes	%
Republican	Dwight Burney	292,135	54.52
Democratic	Frank B. Morrison	243,639	45.47
Scattering		29	
Total votes		535,803	100.00
Republican hold			

== See also ==
- 1956 Nebraska gubernatorial election
