= Hartington, Nebraska =

- City
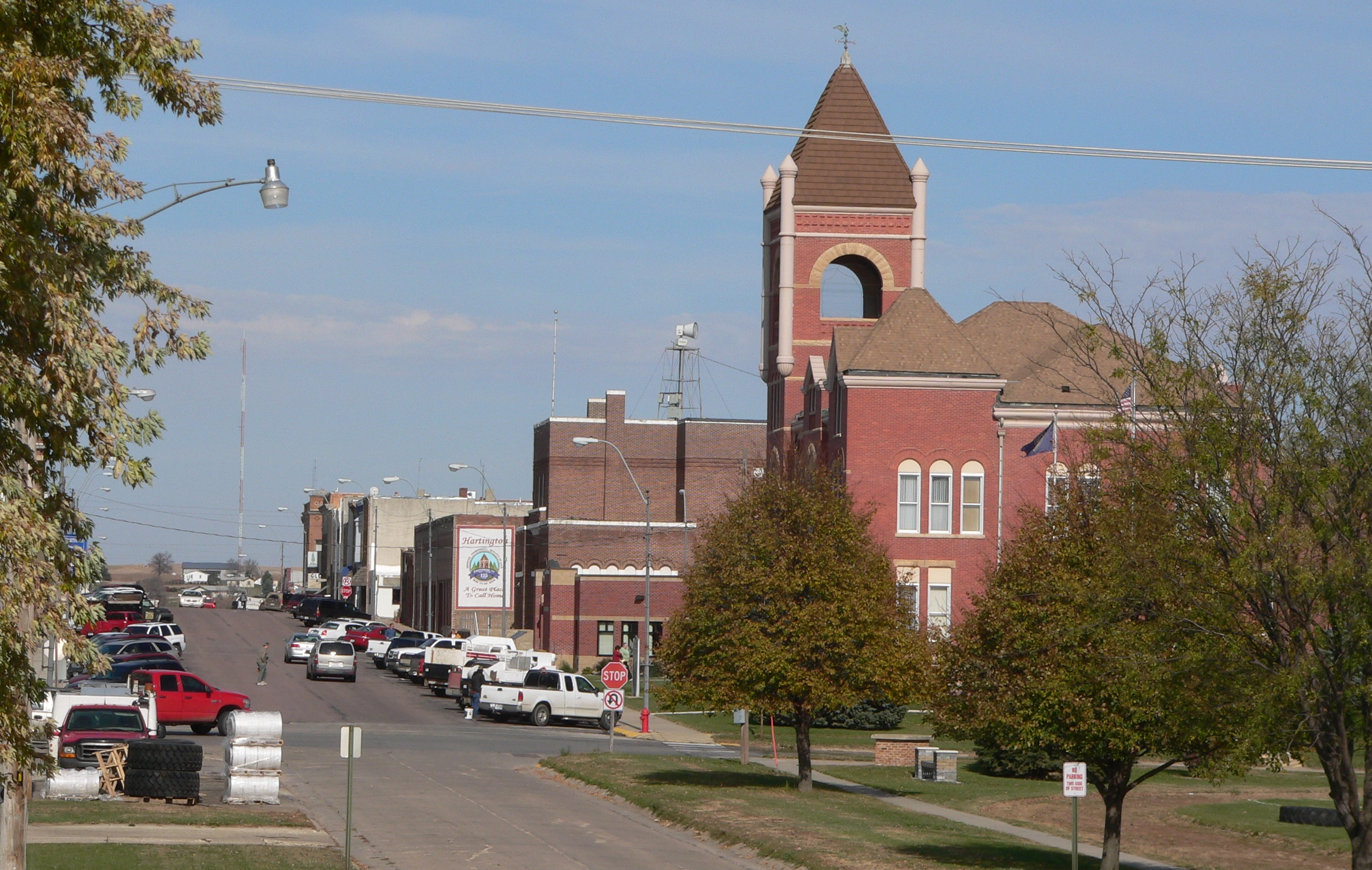
- Downtown Hartington; Cedar County Courthouse in right foreground

- Location of Hartington, Nebraska
- Coordinates: 42°37′13″N 97°16′02″W
- Country: United States
- State: Nebraska
- County: Cedar

Area
  - Total: 1.02 sq mi (2.63 km^{2})
  - Land: 1.02 sq mi (2.63 km^{2})
  - Water: 0 sq mi (0.00 km^{2})
- Elevation: 1,414 ft (431 m)

Population (2020)
  - Total: 1,517
  - Estimate (2021): 1,506
  - Density: 1,493.1/sq mi (576.47/km^{2})
- Time zone: UTC-6 (Central (CST))
  - Summer (DST): UTC-5 (CDT)
- ZIP code: 68739
- Area code: 402
- FIPS code: 31-21275
- GNIS feature ID: 2394310
- Website: www.ci.hartington.ne.us

Hartington is a city in and the county seat of Cedar County, Nebraska, United States. The population was 1,514 at the 2020 census.

== History ==
Hartington was platted in 1883, as a water stop on the railroad. It was named for Lord Hartington, who had then recently paid a visit to the U.S.

Hartington Nebraska High School in 193

=== Historic buildings ===
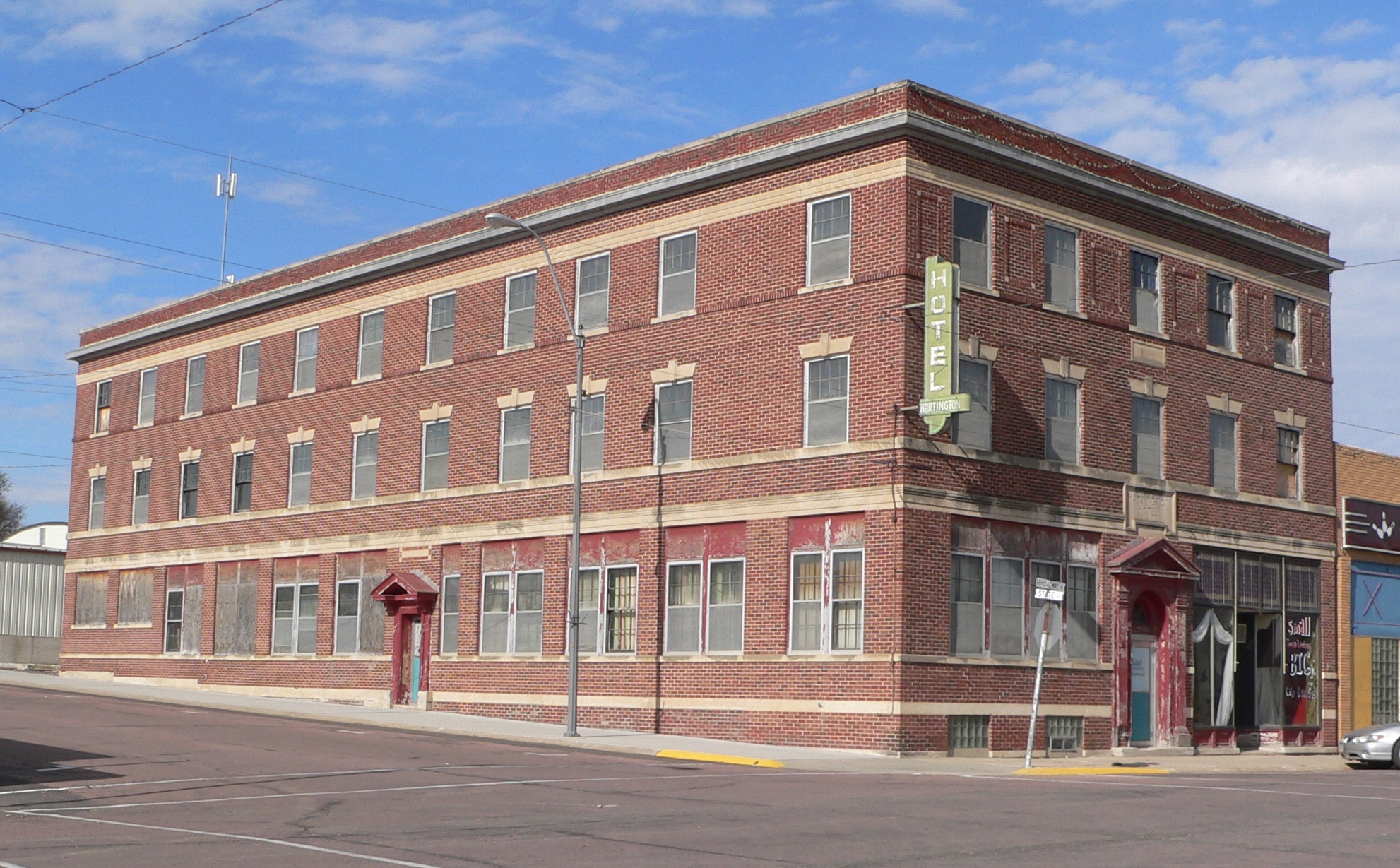
The historic Hartington Hotel is among the local buildings included on the National Register of Historic Places.

Hartington includes a number of historic buildings. These include three brick structures on the National Register of Historic Places: the Prairie School Hartington City Hall and Auditorium (1921–1923), the Romanesque Revival Cedar County Courthouse (1890–1891), and the Colonial Revival Hartington Hotel (1917).

== Geography ==
According to the United States Census Bureau, the city has a total area of 0.94 square miles (2.43 km^{2}), all land.

Hartington is served by Nebraska State Highways 57 and 84.

=== Climate ===
On July 17, 1936, Hartington experienced the highest recorded temperature in Nebraska state history at 118 °F (47.8 °C); it shares this record with Minden and Geneva.

Climate data for Hartington, Nebraska (1991–2020, extremes 1893–present)
Month	Jan	Feb	Mar	Apr	May	Jun	Jul	Aug	Sep	Oct	Nov	Dec	Year
Record high °F (°C)	74 (23)	76 (24)	92 (33)	102 (39)	108 (42)	109 (43)	118 (48)	111 (44)	105 (41)	97 (36)	82 (28)	72 (22)	118 (48)
Mean maximum °F (°C)	55.4 (13.0)	59.8 (15.4)	73.4 (23.0)	83.3 (28.5)	88.9 (31.6)	93.9 (34.4)	94.9 (34.9)	93.8 (34.3)	90.7 (32.6)	85.7 (29.8)	70.6 (21.4)	55.7 (13.2)	96.9 (36.1)
Mean daily maximum °F (°C)	30.3 (−0.9)	34.8 (1.6)	47.1 (8.4)	59.2 (15.1)	70.4 (21.3)	80.3 (26.8)	84.8 (29.3)	82.4 (28.0)	76.0 (24.4)	62.5 (16.9)	46.8 (8.2)	33.6 (0.9)	59.0 (15.0)
Daily mean °F (°C)	20.2 (−6.6)	24.1 (−4.4)	35.4 (1.9)	47.1 (8.4)	59.1 (15.1)	69.6 (20.9)	74.0 (23.3)	71.4 (21.9)	63.5 (17.5)	50.1 (10.1)	35.7 (2.1)	24.0 (−4.4)	47.9 (8.8)
Mean daily minimum °F (°C)	10.1 (−12.2)	13.3 (−10.4)	23.7 (−4.6)	35.0 (1.7)	47.8 (8.8)	59.0 (15.0)	63.2 (17.3)	60.4 (15.8)	51.0 (10.6)	37.7 (3.2)	24.6 (−4.1)	14.3 (−9.8)	36.7 (2.6)
Mean minimum °F (°C)	−10.4 (−23.6)	−6.2 (−21.2)	4.0 (−15.6)	20.8 (−6.2)	33.7 (0.9)	46.7 (8.2)	51.2 (10.7)	49.3 (9.6)	34.7 (1.5)	22.1 (−5.5)	7.0 (−13.9)	−6.6 (−21.4)	−14.8 (−26.0)
Record low °F (°C)	−38 (−39)	−33 (−36)	−17 (−27)	1 (−17)	19 (−7)	35 (2)	38 (3)	35 (2)	20 (−7)	5 (−15)	−17 (−27)	−33 (−36)	−38 (−39)
Average precipitation inches (mm)	0.57 (14)	0.84 (21)	1.50 (38)	3.21 (82)	4.37 (111)	4.64 (118)	3.46 (88)	3.34 (85)	3.01 (76)	2.56 (65)	1.30 (33)	0.79 (20)	29.59 (752)
Average snowfall inches (cm)	8.1 (21)	6.7 (17)	6.2 (16)	4.0 (10)	0.0 (0.0)	0.0 (0.0)	0.0 (0.0)	0.0 (0.0)	0.0 (0.0)	0.9 (2.3)	4.6 (12)	4.8 (12)	35.3 (90)
Average precipitation days (≥ 0.01 in)	3.9	4.3	5.1	8.6	10.0	8.9	7.2	7.0	6.1	5.6	4.0	4.0	74.7
Average snowy days (≥ 0.1 in)	4.6	3.7	3.0	1.2	0.0	0.0	0.0	0.0	0.0	0.4	2.2	3.9	19.0
Source: NOAA

== Demographics ==
Historical population
Census	Pop.	Note	%±
1900	971		—
1910	1,413		45.5%
1920	1,467		3.8%
1930	1,568		6.9%
1940	1,688		7.7%
1950	1,660		−1.7%
1960	1,648		−0.7%
1970	1,581		−4.1%
1980	1,730		9.4%
1990	1,583		−8.5%
2000	1,640		3.6%
2010	1,554		−5.2%
2020	1,517		−2.4%
U.S. Decennial Census

=== 2010 census ===
At the 2010 census there were 1,554 people, 641 households, and 402 families living in the city. The population density was 1,653.2 inhabitants per square mile (638.3/km^{2}). There were 715 housing units at an average density of 760.6 per square mile (293.7/km^{2}). The racial make-up of the city was 99.2% White, 0.1% African American, 0.2% Native American, 0.1% Asian, 0.1% from other races, and 0.3% from two or more races. Hispanic or Latino of any race were 0.5%.

Of the 641 households 28.4% had children under the age of 18 living with them, 56.5% were married couples living together, 4.4% had a female householder with no husband present, 1.9% had a male householder with no wife present, and 37.3% were non-families. 34.8% of households were one person and 21.3% were one person aged 65 or older. The average household size was 2.34 and the average family size was 3.08.

The median age was 42.6 years. 26.1% of residents were under the age of 18; 6.1% were between the ages of 18 and 24; 19.7% were from 25 to 44; 21.9% were from 45 to 64; and 26.2% were 65 or older. The gender makeup of the city was 49.8% male and 50.2% female.

=== 2000 census ===
At the 2000 census there were 1,640 people, 670 households, and 416 families living in the city. The population density was 1,821.5 inhabitants per square mile (703.3/km^{2}). There were 738 housing units at an average density of 819.7 per square mile (316.5/km^{2}). The racial makeup of the city was 99.15% White, 0.12% Native American, 0.06% from other races, and 0.67% from two or more races. Hispanic or Latino of any race were 0.24%.

Of the 670 households 30.1% had children under the age of 18 living with them, 55.4% were married couples living together, 4.3% had a female householder with no husband present, and 37.9% were non-families. 34.5% of households were one person and 22.1% were one person aged 65 or older. The average household size was 2.36 and the average family size was 3.12.

The age distribution was 27.3% under the age of 18, 6.1% from 18 to 24, 22.4% from 25 to 44, 18.3% from 45 to 64, and 25.9% 65 or older. The median age was 40 years. For every 100 females, there were 96.4 males. For every 100 females age 18 and over, there were 88.0 males.

The median household income was $33,365, and the median family income was $43,897. Males had a median income of $30,848 versus $18,452 for females. The per capita income for the city was $16,133. About 1.7% of families and 6.2% of the population were below the poverty line, including 2.0% of those under age 18 and 11.1% of those age 65 or over.

== Notable people ==
- Ralph G. Brooks - 29th governor of Nebraska
- Dwight Burney, 30th governor of Nebraska
- Willard H. Burney, member of the Nebraska House of Representatives
- Russ Hochstein, American football guard for the Kansas City Chiefs
- James Lee Rankin, United States Solicitor General 1956-61
- Charles Thone, U.S. Representative 1971–79, governor of Nebraska 1979-83

== See also ==
- Hartington City Hall and Auditorium
