= List of governors of Nebraska =

Governor of Nebraska
- Seal of Nebraska

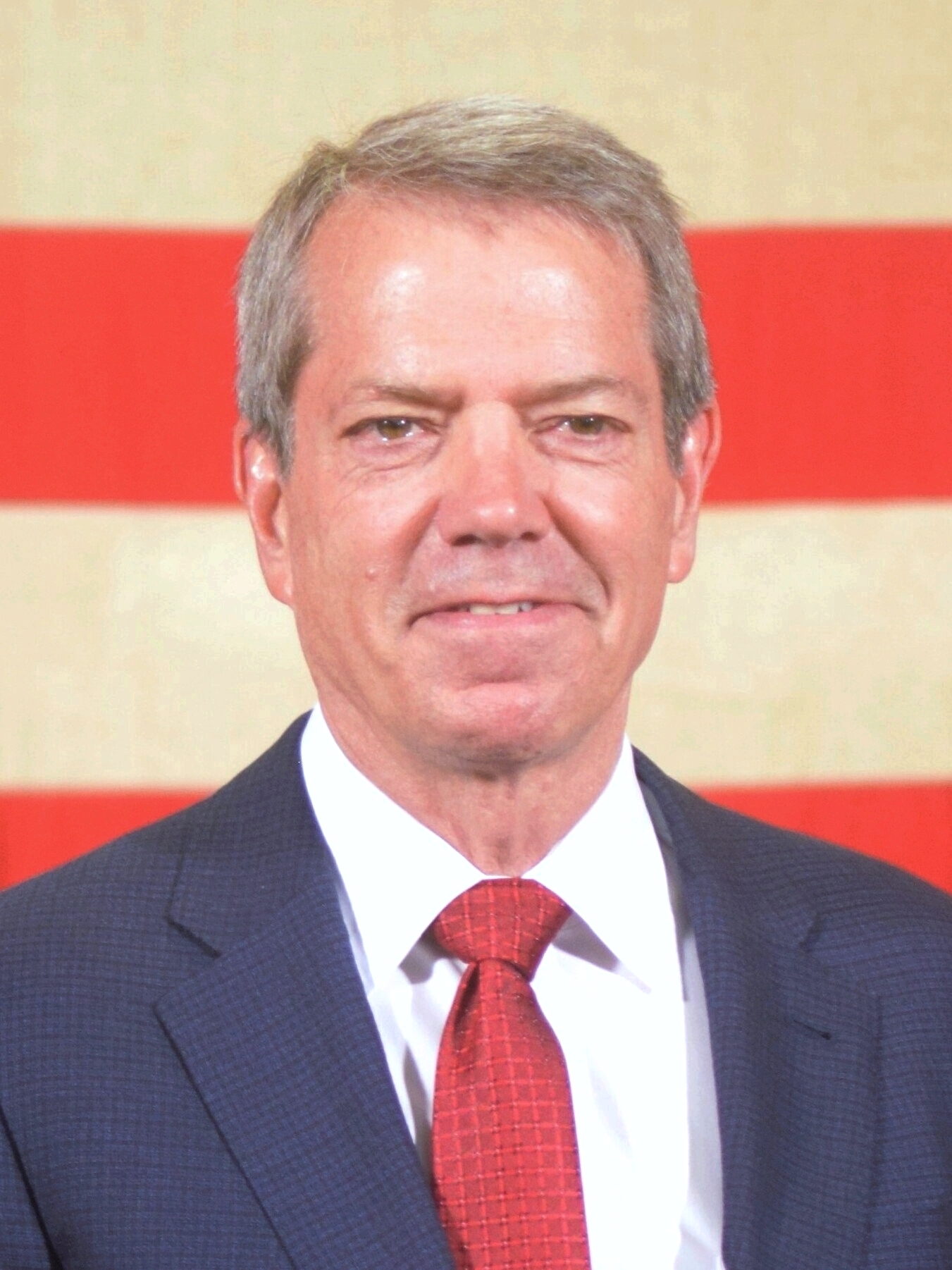
- Incumbent; Jim Pillen since January 5, 2023
- Style: The Honorable
- Residence: Nebraska Governor's Mansion
- Term length: 4 years, renewable once consecutively
- Inaugural holder: David Butler
- Formation: Constitution of Nebraska
- Succession: Line of succession
- Deputy: Lieutenant Governor of Nebraska
- Salary: $105,000 (2022)
- Website: governor.nebraska.gov

The governor of Nebraska is the head of government of the U.S. state of Nebraska as provided by the fourth article of the Constitution of Nebraska. The officeholder is elected to a four-year term, with elections held two years after presidential elections. The governor may be elected any number of times, but not more than twice in a row. The current officeholder is Jim Pillen, a Republican, who was sworn in on January 5, 2023.

Governors of Nebraska must be at least 30 years old and have been citizens and residents of the state for five years before being elected. Before 1966, the governor was elected to a two-year term. In 1962, a constitutional amendment extended the gubernatorial term to four years, effective with the 1966 election. In 1966, another amendment imposed a term limit of two consecutive terms. The lieutenant governor is subject to the same limitations and runs on a combined ticket with the governor. Charles W. Bryan is the only Governor of Nebraska to serve non-consecutive terms. Dave Heineman holds the record as Nebraska's longest-serving governor with 10 years.

The governor's term, along with all other elected statewide officers, begins on the first Thursday after the first Tuesday in the month of January after an election. If the governor becomes incapacitated or is out of the state, the lieutenant governor acts as governor; if there is a vacancy or permanent incapacitation, the lieutenant governor becomes governor and serves the balance of the term. However, if both offices become vacant, the next person in the line of succession is the Speaker of the Nebraska Legislature, who is then followed by the chairs of various committees in the legislature.

== List of governors ==
=== Nebraska Territory ===
Nebraska Territory was organized on May 30, 1854. It had five governors appointed by the president of the United States.

On July 26, 1853, William Walker was elected provisional governor of Nebraska Territory; this spurred the federal government into action to organize the territory.

Governors of the Territory of Nebraska
No.	Governor	Term in office (Note: The range given is from the date the governor was confirmed by the Senate, or appointed by the President during a Senate recess, to the date the governor left office.)	Appointed by
1	Francis Burt (1807–1854)	August 2, 1854 (Note: William O. Butler was nominated on June 22, 1854, and confirmed by the Senate on June 29, but declined the nomination. Burt was then nominated and confirmed by the Senate on August 2, and was sworn in on October 16.) – October 18, 1854 (78 days; died in office) (Note: Burt died two days after being sworn in; Territorial Secretary Thomas B. Cuming acted as governor until Burt's successor arrived in the territory.)	Franklin Pierce
2	Mark W. Izard (1799–1866)	December 20, 1854 (Note: Izard was nominated, and confirmed by the Senate, on December 20, 1854, and arrived in the territory on February 20, 1855.) – October 25, 1857 (1041 days; resigned) (Note: Izard resigned due to political pressure from the president; Territorial Secretary Thomas B. Cuming acted as governor until Izard's successor arrived in the territory.)	Franklin Pierce
3	William Alexander Richardson (1811–1875)	December 10, 1857 (Note: Richardson was nominated, and confirmed by the Senate, on December 10, 1857, and arrived in the territory on January 12, 1858.) – December 5, 1858 (361 days; resigned) (Note: Richardson resigned due to political issues between him and President James Buchanan; Territorial Secretary Julius Sterling Morton acted as governor until Richardson's successor arrived in the territory.)	James Buchanan
4	Samuel W. Black (1816–1862)	February 8, 1859 (Note: Black was nominated on February 3, 1859, and confirmed by the Senate on February 8; he was already residing in the territory when appointed.) – February 24, 1861 (748 days; resigned) (Note: Black resigned, anticipating removal by the newly-elected president Abraham Lincoln; Lincoln's nomination of his successor specifies "vice Samuel L. Black, removed". Territorial Secretary Algernon Paddock acted as governor until Black's successor arrived in the territory.)	James Buchanan
5	Alvin Saunders (1817–1899)	March 27, 1861 (Note: Saunders was nominated on March 26, 1861; confirmed by the Senate on March 27; and arrived in the territory on May 18. He was reconfirmed by the Senate on January 9, 1866.) – March 27, 1867 (2192 days; statehood)	Abraham Lincoln
5	Alvin Saunders (1817–1899)	March 27, 1861 – March 27, 1867 (2192 days; statehood)	Andrew Johnson

=== State of Nebraska ===
Nebraska was admitted to the Union on March 1, 1867.

Governors of the State of Nebraska
No.	Governor	Term in office	Party	Election	Lt. Governor (Note: The office of lieutenant governor was created in 1875.) (Note: Lieutenant governors represented the same party as their governor unless noted.)
1	David Butler (1829–1891)	March 27, 1867 – June 2, 1871 (1529 days; impeached and removed) (Note: Butler was impeached and removed for misappropriating state funds; the impeachment was expunged six years later.)	Republican	1866	Office did not exist
1	David Butler (1829–1891)	March 27, 1867 – June 2, 1871 (1529 days; impeached and removed)	Republican	1868	Office did not exist
1	David Butler (1829–1891)	March 27, 1867 – June 2, 1871 (1529 days; impeached and removed)	Republican	1870	Office did not exist
–	William H. James (1831–1920)	June 2, 1871 – January 13, 1873 (592 days; retired)	Republican	Secretary of state acting	Office did not exist
2	Robert Wilkinson Furnas (1824–1905)	January 13, 1873 – January 12, 1875 (730 days; retired)	Republican	1872	Office did not exist
3	Silas Garber (1833–1905)	January 12, 1875 – January 9, 1879 (1459 days; retired)	Republican	1874	Office did not exist
3	Silas Garber (1833–1905)	January 12, 1875 – January 9, 1879 (1459 days; retired)	Republican	1876	Othman A. Abbott
4	Albinus Nance (1848–1911)	January 9, 1879 – January 4, 1883 (1457 days; retired)	Republican	1878	Edmund C. Carns
4	Albinus Nance (1848–1911)	January 9, 1879 – January 4, 1883 (1457 days; retired)	Republican	1880	Edmund C. Carns
5	James W. Dawes (1845–1918)	January 4, 1883 – January 6, 1887 (1464 days; retired)	Republican	1882	Alfred W. Agee
5	James W. Dawes (1845–1918)	January 4, 1883 – January 6, 1887 (1464 days; retired)	Republican	1884	Hibbard H. Shedd
6	John Milton Thayer (1820–1906)	January 6, 1887 – January 15, 1891 (1471 days; retired) (Note: Thayer was not a candidate in the 1890 election, which Boyd won, and was due to be sworn in on January 8, 1891. However, Thayer challenged Boyd's citizenship, and thus eligibility to be governor, which delayed his inauguration until January 15. The Nebraska Supreme Court then ruled that Boyd was ineligible, and Thayer took office again on May 5; however, the Supreme Court of the United States later ruled that Boyd was eligible, and he took office on February 8, 1892.)	Republican	1886	Hibbard H. Shedd
6	John Milton Thayer (1820–1906)	January 6, 1887 – January 15, 1891 (1471 days; retired)	Republican	1888	George de Rue Meiklejohn
6	John Milton Thayer (1820–1906)	January 6, 1887 – January 15, 1891 (1471 days; retired)	Republican	1888	Thomas Jefferson Majors (Note: Represented the Republican Party)
7	James E. Boyd (1834–1906)	January 15, 1891 – May 5, 1891 (111 days; removed)	Democratic	1890	Thomas Jefferson Majors
6	John Milton Thayer (1820–1906)	May 5, 1891 – February 8, 1892 (280 days; removed)	Republican	1890	Thomas Jefferson Majors
7	James E. Boyd (1834–1906)	February 8, 1892 – January 13, 1893 (341 days; retired)	Democratic	1890	Thomas Jefferson Majors
8	Lorenzo Crounse (1834–1909)	January 13, 1893 – January 3, 1895 (721 days; retired)	Republican	1892	Thomas Jefferson Majors
9	Silas A. Holcomb (1858–1920)	January 3, 1895 – January 5, 1899 (1464 days; retired)	Fusion (Note: Holcomb represented a fusion of the Democratic and Populist parties.)	1894	Robert E. Moore
9	Silas A. Holcomb (1858–1920)	January 3, 1895 – January 5, 1899 (1464 days; retired)	Fusion	1896	James E. Harris
10	William A. Poynter (1848–1909)	January 5, 1899 – January 3, 1901 (729 days; lost election)	Fusion (Note: Poynter represented a fusion of the Democratic, Populist, and Silver Republican parties.)	1898	Edward A. Gilbert
11	Charles H. Dietrich (1853–1924)	January 3, 1901 – May 1, 1901 (119 days; resigned) (Note: Dietrich resigned, having been elected to the United States Senate.)	Republican	1900	Ezra P. Savage
12	Ezra P. Savage (1842–1920)	May 1, 1901 – January 8, 1903 (618 days; retired)	Republican	Succeeded from lieutenant governor	Calvin F. Steele (acting)
13	John H. Mickey (1845–1910)	January 8, 1903 – January 3, 1907 (1457 days; retired)	Republican	1902	Edmund G. McGilton
13	John H. Mickey (1845–1910)	January 8, 1903 – January 3, 1907 (1457 days; retired)	Republican	1904	Edmund G. McGilton
14	George L. Sheldon (1870–1960)	January 3, 1907 – January 7, 1909 (736 days; lost election)	Republican	1906	Melville R. Hopewell (died May 2, 1911)
15	Ashton C. Shallenberger (1862–1938)	January 7, 1909 – January 5, 1911 (729 days; lost nomination) (Note: Shallenberger lost the Democratic nomination to James Dahlman.)	Democratic	1908	Melville R. Hopewell (died May 2, 1911)
16	Chester Hardy Aldrich (1863–1924)	January 5, 1911 – January 9, 1913 (736 days; lost election)	Republican	1910	Melville R. Hopewell (died May 2, 1911)
16	Chester Hardy Aldrich (1863–1924)	January 5, 1911 – January 9, 1913 (736 days; lost election)	Republican	1910	John H. Morehead (Note: Represented the Democratic Party) (acting)
17	John H. Morehead (1861–1942)	January 9, 1913 – January 4, 1917 (1457 days; retired)	Democratic	1912	Samuel Roy McKelvie
17	John H. Morehead (1861–1942)	January 9, 1913 – January 4, 1917 (1457 days; retired)	Democratic	1914	James Pearson
18	Keith Neville (1884–1959)	January 4, 1917 – January 9, 1919 (736 days; lost election)	Democratic	1916	Edgar Howard
19	Samuel Roy McKelvie (1881–1956)	January 9, 1919 – January 4, 1923 (1457 days; retired)	Republican	1918	Pelham A. Barrows
19	Samuel Roy McKelvie (1881–1956)	January 9, 1919 – January 4, 1923 (1457 days; retired)	Republican	1920	Pelham A. Barrows
20	Charles W. Bryan (1867–1945)	January 4, 1923 – January 8, 1925 (736 days; withdrew) (Note: Bryan was renominated for governor, but withdrew to run unsuccessfully for Vice President of the United States.)	Democratic	1922	Fred Gustus Johnson
21	Adam McMullen (1872–1959)	January 8, 1925 – January 3, 1929 (1457 days; retired)	Republican	1924	George A. Williams
21	Adam McMullen (1872–1959)	January 8, 1925 – January 3, 1929 (1457 days; retired)	Republican	1926	George A. Williams
22	Arthur J. Weaver (1873–1945)	January 3, 1929 – January 8, 1931 (736 days; lost election)	Republican	1928	George A. Williams
23	Charles W. Bryan (1867–1945)	January 8, 1931 – January 3, 1935 (1457 days; retired) (Note: Bryan instead ran unsuccessfully for the Democratic nomination for the United States Senate.)	Democratic	1930	Theodore W. Metcalfe
23	Charles W. Bryan (1867–1945)	January 8, 1931 – January 3, 1935 (1457 days; retired)	Democratic	1932	Walter H. Jurgensen (removed June 26, 1938)
24	Roy Cochran (1886–1963)	January 3, 1935 – January 9, 1941 (2199 days; retired) (Note: Cochran instead ran unsuccessfully for the United States Senate.)	Democratic	1934	Walter H. Jurgensen (removed June 26, 1938)
24	Roy Cochran (1886–1963)	January 3, 1935 – January 9, 1941 (2199 days; retired)	Democratic	1936	Walter H. Jurgensen (removed June 26, 1938)
24	Roy Cochran (1886–1963)	January 3, 1935 – January 9, 1941 (2199 days; retired)	Democratic	1936	Vacant
24	Roy Cochran (1886–1963)	January 3, 1935 – January 9, 1941 (2199 days; retired)	Democratic	1936	Nate M. Parsons (elected November 8, 1938)
24	Roy Cochran (1886–1963)	January 3, 1935 – January 9, 1941 (2199 days; retired)	Democratic	1938	William E. Johnson
25	Dwight Griswold (1893–1954)	January 9, 1941 – January 9, 1947 (2192 days; retired)	Republican	1940	William E. Johnson
25	Dwight Griswold (1893–1954)	January 9, 1941 – January 9, 1947 (2192 days; retired)	Republican	1942	Roy W. Johnson
25	Dwight Griswold (1893–1954)	January 9, 1941 – January 9, 1947 (2192 days; retired)	Republican	1944	Roy W. Johnson
26	Val Peterson (1903–1983)	January 9, 1947 – January 8, 1953 (2192 days; retired) (Note: Peterson instead ran unsuccessfully for the Republican nomination for the United States Senate.)	Republican	1946	Robert B. Crosby
26	Val Peterson (1903–1983)	January 9, 1947 – January 8, 1953 (2192 days; retired)	Republican	1948	Charles J. Warner (died September 24, 1955)
26	Val Peterson (1903–1983)	January 9, 1947 – January 8, 1953 (2192 days; retired)	Republican	1950	Charles J. Warner (died September 24, 1955)
27	Robert B. Crosby (1911–2000)	January 8, 1953 – January 6, 1955 (729 days; retired) (Note: Crosby instead ran unsuccessfully for the Republican nomination for the United States Senate.)	Republican	1952	Charles J. Warner (died September 24, 1955)
28	Victor Anderson (1902–1962)	January 6, 1955 – January 8, 1959 (1464 days; lost election)	Republican	1954	Charles J. Warner (died September 24, 1955)
28	Victor Anderson (1902–1962)	January 6, 1955 – January 8, 1959 (1464 days; lost election)	Republican	1954	Vacant
28	Victor Anderson (1902–1962)	January 6, 1955 – January 8, 1959 (1464 days; lost election)	Republican	1956	Dwight Burney
29	Ralph Brooks (1898–1960)	January 8, 1959 – September 9, 1960 (611 days; died in office) (Note: Brooks was running for the United States Senate at the time of his death, having already received the Democratic nomination.)	Democratic	1958	Dwight Burney
30	Dwight Burney (1892–1987)	September 9, 1960 – January 5, 1961 (119 days; retired) (Note: Burney was instead reelected as lieutenant governor.)	Republican	Succeeded from lieutenant governor	Vacant
31	Frank B. Morrison (1905–2004)	January 5, 1961 – January 5, 1967 (2192 days; retired) (Note: Morrison instead ran unsuccessfully for the United States Senate; it is not known if the new gubernatorial term limit would have applied to him.)	Democratic	1960	Dwight Burney
31	Frank B. Morrison (1905–2004)	January 5, 1961 – January 5, 1967 (2192 days; retired)	Democratic	1962	Dwight Burney
31	Frank B. Morrison (1905–2004)	January 5, 1961 – January 5, 1967 (2192 days; retired)	Democratic	1964	Philip Sorensen
32	Norbert Tiemann (1924–2012)	January 5, 1967 – January 7, 1971 (1464 days; lost election)	Republican	1966	John Everroad
33	J. James Exon (1921–2005)	January 7, 1971 – January 4, 1979 (2920 days; term-limited) (Note: Exon, being term-limited, (Note: Under a 1966 amendment to the constitution, governors are ineligible for four years after the expiration of two consecutive elected terms.) had already been elected to the United States Senate when his term expired.)	Democratic	1970	Frank Marsh
33	J. James Exon (1921–2005)	January 7, 1971 – January 4, 1979 (2920 days; term-limited)	Democratic	1974	Gerald Whelan
34	Charles Thone (1924–2018)	January 4, 1979 – January 6, 1983 (1464 days; lost election)	Republican	1978	Roland Luedtke
35	Bob Kerrey (b. 1943)	January 6, 1983 – January 8, 1987 (1464 days; retired)	Democratic	1982	Donald McGinley
36	Kay Orr (b. 1939)	January 8, 1987 – January 10, 1991 (1464 days; lost election)	Republican	1986	William E. Nichol
37	Ben Nelson (b. 1941)	January 10, 1991 – January 7, 1999 (2920 days; term-limited)	Democratic	1990	Maxine Moul (resigned October 6, 1993)
37	Ben Nelson (b. 1941)	January 10, 1991 – January 7, 1999 (2920 days; term-limited)	Democratic	1990	Kim Robak (appointed October 6, 1993)
37	Ben Nelson (b. 1941)	January 10, 1991 – January 7, 1999 (2920 days; term-limited)	Democratic	1994	Kim Robak (appointed October 6, 1993)
38	Mike Johanns (b. 1950)	January 7, 1999 – January 20, 2005 (2206 days; resigned) (Note: Johanns resigned, having been confirmed as United States Secretary of Agriculture.)	Republican	1998	David Maurstad (resigned October 1, 2001)
38	Mike Johanns (b. 1950)	January 7, 1999 – January 20, 2005 (2206 days; resigned)	Republican	1998	Dave Heineman (appointed October 1, 2001)
38	Mike Johanns (b. 1950)	January 7, 1999 – January 20, 2005 (2206 days; resigned)	Republican	2002	Dave Heineman (appointed October 1, 2001)
39	Dave Heineman (b. 1948)	January 20, 2005 – January 8, 2015 (3641 days; term-limited)	Republican	Succeeded from lieutenant governor	Vacant
39	Dave Heineman (b. 1948)	January 20, 2005 – January 8, 2015 (3641 days; term-limited)	Republican	Succeeded from lieutenant governor	Rick Sheehy (appointed January 24, 2005) (resigned February 2, 2013)
39	Dave Heineman (b. 1948)	January 20, 2005 – January 8, 2015 (3641 days; term-limited)	Republican	2006	Rick Sheehy (appointed January 24, 2005) (resigned February 2, 2013)
39	Dave Heineman (b. 1948)	January 20, 2005 – January 8, 2015 (3641 days; term-limited)	Republican	2010	Rick Sheehy (appointed January 24, 2005) (resigned February 2, 2013)
39	Dave Heineman (b. 1948)	January 20, 2005 – January 8, 2015 (3641 days; term-limited)	Republican	2010	Vacant
39	Dave Heineman (b. 1948)	January 20, 2005 – January 8, 2015 (3641 days; term-limited)	Republican	2010	Lavon Heidemann (appointed February 13, 2013) (resigned September 9, 2014)
39	Dave Heineman (b. 1948)	January 20, 2005 – January 8, 2015 (3641 days; term-limited)	Republican	2010	Vacant
39	Dave Heineman (b. 1948)	January 20, 2005 – January 8, 2015 (3641 days; term-limited)	Republican	2010	John E. Nelson (appointed September 29, 2014)
40	Pete Ricketts (b. 1964)	January 8, 2015 – January 5, 2023 (2920 days; term-limited)	Republican	2014	Mike Foley
40	Pete Ricketts (b. 1964)	January 8, 2015 – January 5, 2023 (2920 days; term-limited)	Republican	2018	Mike Foley
41	Jim Pillen (b. 1955)	January 5, 2023 – Incumbent (Note: Pillen's term will expire on January 7, 2027; he was elected to a second term on November 3, 2026.) (in office 1418 days)	Republican	2022	Joe Kelly
41	Jim Pillen (b. 1955)	January 5, 2023 – Incumbent (in office 1418 days)	Republican	2026	Joe Kelly

== Timeline ==
Timeline of Nebraska governors

== See also ==
- Gubernatorial lines of succession in the United States § Nebraska
- Lieutenant Governor of Nebraska
- List of Nebraska state legislatures

== Sources ==
- "Former Nebraska Governors". National Governors Association.
- "Nebraska Constitution". State Democracy Research Initiative. University of Wisconsin Law School.
- Glashan, Roy R. (1979). American Governors and Gubernatorial Elections, 1775-1978. Meckler Books. ISBN 0-7201-1511-6 – via Internet Archive.
- Kallenbach, Joseph E.; Kallenbach, Jessamine S. (1977). American State Governors, 1776-1976. Oceana Publications. ISBN 978-0-379-00665-0 – via Internet Archive.
- McMullin, Thomas A.; Walker, David (1984). Biographical Directory of American Territorial Governors. Meckler Publishing. ISBN 0-930466-11-X – via Internet Archive.
- Mullaney, Marie Marmo (1994). Biographical Directory of the Governors of the United States, 1988–1994. Greenwood Publishing Group. ISBN 0-313-28312-5 – via Internet Archive.
- Sobel, Robert; Raimo, John (1978). Biographical Directory of the Governors of the United States, 1789-1978. Vol. 3. Meckler Books. ISBN 0-930466-01-2 – via Internet Archive.
- Thorpe, Francis Newton, ed. (1909). The Federal and State Constitutions, Colonial Charters, and Other Organic Laws of the States, Territories, and Colonies Now or Heretofore Forming the United States of America. Vol. 4. United States Government Publishing Office – via Internet Archive.
