= 1966 Nebraska gubernatorial election =

- November 8, 1966

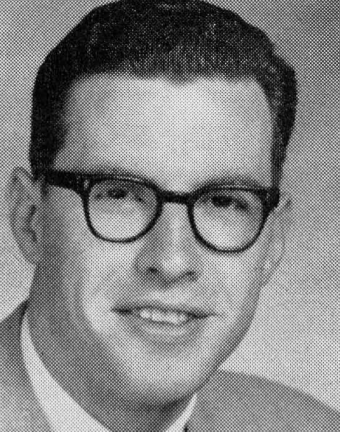
Nominee	Norbert Tiemann	Philip Sorensen
Party	Republican	Democratic
Popular vote	299,245	186,985
Percentage	61.52%	38.44%
- County results Tiemann: 50–60% 60–70% 70–80% 80–90% Sorensen: 50–60%
Governor before election
Frank B. Morrison
Democratic
Elected Governor
Norbert Tiemann
Republican

The 1966 Nebraska gubernatorial election was held on November 8, 1966, and featured former Wausa Mayor Norbert Tiemann, a Republican, defeating Democratic nominee, Lieutenant Governor Philip Sorensen. This was the first gubernatorial election in Nebraska in which the term in office was extended from two to four years, with a limit of two consecutive terms.

== Democratic primary ==
=== Candidates ===
- Julius W. Burbach, member of the Nebraska Legislature
- Henry E. Ley, CEO of State National Bank
- Philip Sorensen, Lieutenant Governor

=== Results ===
Democratic primary results
Party	Candidate	Votes	%
Democratic	Philip Sorensen	65,051	56.79
Democratic	Julius W. Burbach	35,439	30.94
Democratic	Henry E. Ley	13,819	12.07
Democratic	Write-in	233	0.20

== Republican primary ==
=== Candidates ===
- Bruce Hagemeister
- Albert E. Hahn
- Henry E. Kuhlmann
- Val Peterson, former Governor and U.S. Ambassador to Denmark
- Norbert Tiemann, former Mayor of Wausa

=== Results ===
Republican primary results
Party	Candidate	Votes	%
Republican	Norbert Tiemann	78,338	43.27
Republican	Val Peterson	63,589	35.13
Republican	Bruce Hagemeister	25,574	14.13
Republican	Henry E. Kuhlmann	12,052	6.66
Republican	Albert E. Hahn	1,426	0.79
Republican	Write-in	45	0.03

== General election ==
=== Results ===
Nebraska gubernatorial election, 1966
Party	Candidate	Votes	%
Republican	Norbert Tiemann	299,245	61.52%
Democratic	Philip Sorensen	186,985	38.44%
Write-in	Others	166	0.03%
Total votes		486,396	100.0%
Republican gain from Democratic			

==== By County ====
By county

County	Person Democratic		Person Republican		Various candidates Other parties		Margin		Total votes
County	#	%	#	%	#	%	#	%	Total votes
Adams County									
Antelope County									
Arthur County									
Banner County									
Blaine County									
Boone County									
Box Butte County									
Boyd County									
Brown County									
Buffalo County									
Burt County									
Butler County									
Cass County									
Cedar County									
Chase County									
Cherry County									
Cheyenne County									
Clay County									
Colfax County									
Cuming County									
Custer County									
Dakota County									
Dawes County									
Dawson County									
Deuel County									
Dixon County									
Dodge County									
Douglas County									
Dundy County									
Fillmore County									
Franklin County									
Frontier County									
Furnas County									
Gage County									
Garden County									
Garfield County									
Gosper County									
Grant County									
Greeley County									
Hall County									
Hamilton County									
Hayes County									
Hitchcock County									
Holt County									
Hooker County									
Howard County									
Jefferson County									
Johnson County									
Kearney County									
Keith County									
Keya Paha County									
Kimball County									
Knox County									
Lancaster County									
Lincoln County									
Logan County									
Loup County									
Madison County									
McPherson County									
Merrick County									
Morrill County									
Nance County									
Nance County									
Nemaha County									
Nuckolls County									
Otoe County									
Pawnee County									
Perkins County									
Phelps County									
Pierce County									
Platte County									
Polk County									
Red Willow County									
Richardson County									
Rock County									
Saline County									
Sarpy County									
Saunders County									
Scotts Bluff County									
Seward County									
Sheridan County									
Sioux County									
Stanton County									
Thayer County									
Stanton County									
Thurston County									
Valley County									
Washington County									
Wayne County									
Webster County									
Wheeler County									
York County									
Totals									

== See also ==
- 1966 Nebraska lieutenant gubernatorial election
