= Justice Morrison =

Justice Morrison may refer to:

- Frank B. Morrison Jr. (1937–2006), associate justice of the Montana Supreme Court
- Robert F. Morrison (1826–1887), chief justice of the Supreme Court of California

== See also ==
- Judge Morrison (disambiguation)
