= 1960 Nebraska lieutenant gubernatorial election =

- November 8, 1960
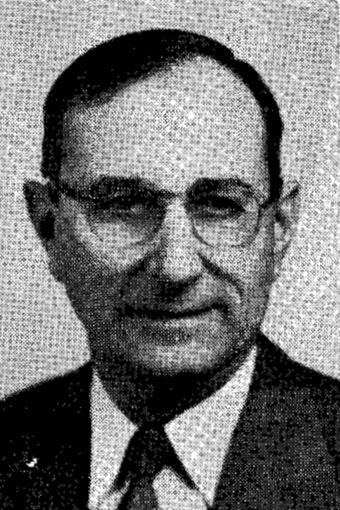

Nominee	Dwight Burney	Norman A. Otto
Party	Republican	Democratic
Popular vote	338,824	242,891
Percentage	58.2%	41.8%
- County results Burney: 50–60% 60–70% 70–80% 80–90% Otto: 50–60%
Lieutenant Governor before election
Dwight Burney
Republican
Elected Lieutenant Governor
Dwight Burney
Republican

The 1960 Nebraska lieutenant gubernatorial election was held on November 8, 1960. Prior to the election, on September 9, 1960, Nebraska Governor Ralph G. Brooks died while in office. This caused then Nebraska Lieutenant Governor Dwight Burney to become Governor of Nebraska two months before the election in which he was running for reelection as lieutenant governor. Thus, the 1960 lieutenant governor election featured incumbent Nebraska Governor Dwight Burney, a Republican, defeating Democratic nominee Norman A. Otto, who was chosen by the Nebraska Democratic Party to replace Edward A. Dosek, who had won the Democratic primaries but had withdrawn from the race.

== Democratic primary ==
=== Candidates ===
- Edward A. Dosek, insurance agent from Lincoln, Nebraska
- James LaHood
- Norman A. Otto, member of the Nebraska Legislature from District 36
- Earl Sitner

=== Results ===
Democratic primary results
Party	Candidate	Votes	%
Democratic	Edward A. Dosek	36,937	39.48
Democratic	Norman A. Otto	24,970	26.69
Democratic	Earl Sitner	17,110	18.29
Democratic	James LaHood	14,508	15.51
Scattering		22	

== Republican primary ==
=== Candidates ===
- Lester Anderson, former member of the Nebraska Legislature from District 34
- Dwight Burney, incumbent Nebraska Lieutenant Governor
- John G. Donner, member of the Nebraska Legislature from District 27
- Marvin Griswold, businessman from Lincoln, Nebraska
- John W. Rost

=== Results ===
Republican primary results
Party	Candidate	Votes	%
Republican	Dwight Burney (incumbent)	75,492	52.64
Republican	Marvin Griswold	30,526	21.28
Republican	Lester H. Anderson	26,801	18.69
Republican	John G. Donner	6,808	4.75
Republican	John W. Rost	3,751	2.62
Scattering		43	

== General election ==
Although Edward A. Dosek won the Democratic primary for lieutenant governor on May 10, 1960, he did not run in the general election on November 8. On September 7, 1960, Dosek announced that he had withdrawn from the race for health reasons and the fact that his insurance license had been suspended. The Nebraska Democratic Party then chose Norman A. Otto, who finished second in the Democratic primaries, to succeed him and run in the general election.

=== Results ===
Nebraska lieutenant gubernatorial election, 1960
Party	Candidate	Votes	%
Republican	Dwight Burney (incumbent)	338,824	58.24
Democratic	Norman A. Otto	242,891	41.75
Scattering		22	
Total votes		581,737	100.00
Republican hold			

== See also ==
- 1960 Nebraska gubernatorial election
