= Willard H. Burney =

American politician

Willard H. Burney (July 5, 1857 – January 20, 1943) was an American politician. He served as a member of the Nebraska Legislature.

== Biography ==
Burney was born in Grant County, Wisconsin. He was a member of the Nebraska House of Representatives as a member of the Republican Party. Burney was a Congregationalist.

Burney married Julia A. Jones in 1880 and they had six children. Their son, Dwight, served as the 30th governor of Nebraska.

== Death ==
Burney died in 1943 in Hartington, Nebraska and is interred at Hartington Cemetery.
