= Robert M. Armstrong =

American politician (1892–1981)

Member of the Nebraska Legislature from the 2nd district
- In office January 5, 1937 – January 3, 1939
- Preceded by: Position created
- Succeeded by: Frank Sorrell

Personal details
- Born: April 29, 1892 Auburn, Nebraska
- Died: June 16, 1981 (aged 89)
- Party: Republican
- Spouse: Alma Grace Plasters (m. 1914)
- Children: 2
- Education: University of Nebraska (LL.B.)
- Occupation: Attorney

Robert McDowell Armstrong (April 29, 1892 – June 16, 1981) was a Republican politician from Nebraska who served as a member of the Nebraska Legislature from the 2nd district from 1937 to 1939 and as the Nebraska Tax Commissioner from 1943 to 1948.

Armstrong was born in Auburn, Nebraska, in 1892. He attended the University of Nebraska, receiving his bachelor of laws degree in 1913. Armstrong practiced law in Auburn, serving as the city attorney, and was elected as a Nemaha County Court Judge in 1920.

In 1936, Armstrong was elected to the Nebraska Legislature from the 2nd district, defeating Lloyd Peterson with 60 percent of the vote. Though the race was formally nonpartisan, Armstrong was a Republican. He ran for re-election in 1938 and was defeated by Frank Sorrell.

After leaving the legislature, Armstrong was named state Tax Commissioner by Governor Dwight Griswold in 1943. He served until 1948, when he resigned to serve as the director of the Omaha Association of Taxpayers.

Armstrong died on June 16, 1981.
