= 1966 United States Senate election in Nebraska =

- November 8, 1966
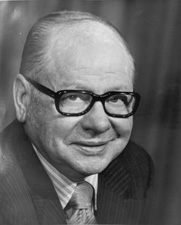

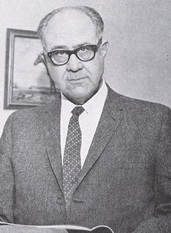
Nominee	Carl Curtis	Frank B. Morrison
Party	Republican	Democratic
Popular vote	296,116	187,950
Percentage	61.04%	38.75%
- County results Curtis: 50–60% 60–70% 70–80% 80–90% Morrison: 50–60%
U.S. senator before election
Carl Curtis
Republican
Elected U.S. Senator
Carl Curtis
Republican

The 1966 United States Senate election in Nebraska was held on November 8, 1966. Incumbent Republican Senator Carl Curtis ran for a third term and was challenged by Governor Frank B. Morrison, the Democratic nominee. While Morrison had been re-elected as Governor in 1964 by a wide margin, the nationwide environment favored Republican candidates, and Curtis was re-elected overwhelmingly, defeating Morrison with 61% of the vote.

== Democratic primary ==
=== Candidates ===
- Frank B. Morrison, Governor of Nebraska
- Raymond W. Arndt, personnel director at the Nebraska Public Power District, 1964 Democratic nominee for the U.S. Senate

=== Results ===
Democratic primary results
Party	Candidate	Votes	%
Democratic	Frank B. Morrison	91,178	77.97%
Democratic	Raymond W. Arndt	25,657	21.94%
Democratic	Write-ins	112	0.10%
Total votes		116,947	100.00%

== Republican primary ==
=== Candidates ===
- Carl Curtis, incumbent Senator

=== Results ===
Republican primary results
Party	Candidate	Votes	%
Republican	Carl Curtis (inc.)	161,331	99.84%
Republican	Write-ins	263	0.16%
Total votes		161,594	100.00%

== Results ==
1966 United States Senate election in Nebraska
Party	Candidate	Votes	%	±%
Republican	Carl Curtis (inc.)	296,116	61.04%	+2.11%
Democratic	Frank B. Morrison	187,950	38.75%	−2.33%
Independent	Tom Rehorn	830	0.17%	—
Write-in		205	0.04%	—
Majority		108,166	22.30%	+4.44%
Total votes		485,101	100.00%	
Republican hold				
