= Frank B. Morrison Jr. =

American judge

Frank Morrison Jr.

Justice of the Montana Supreme Court
- In office 1981–1987

Personal details
- Born: September 27, 1937 McCook, Nebraska
- Died: January 8, 2006 (aged 68) Renton, Washington
- Party: Democratic
- Relations: Frank B. Morrison (father)
- Children: John Morrison

Frank Brenner Morrison Jr. (September 27, 1937 – January 8, 2006) was an American attorney, politician, and jurist who served as a justice of the Montana Supreme Court.

== Early life and education ==
Morrison was born in McCook, Nebraska. His father, Frank B. Morrison, served as Governor of Nebraska from 1961 to 1967. He received a bachelor's degree from the University of Nebraska and a law degree from University of Denver School of Law.

== Career ==
Morrison practiced law in Omaha, Nebraska and became involved with the Democratic Party. In 1968, Morrison and his family moved to Whitefish, Montana, where he practiced law. He ran for the nomination of Governor of Montana in 1988 and 1992. In 1981, Morrison was appointed to one of two newly-created seats on the Montana Supreme Court, where he served until 1987. In 1988, he resumed his law practice and taught at the University of Montana School of Law.

== Death ==
Morrison died in Renton, Washington as a result of complications from emergency surgery. Morrison's son, John Morrison, served as the Montana State Auditor from 2001 to 2009 and was an unsuccessful candidate for the United States Senate.
