= Judge Morrison =

Judge Morrison may refer to:

- Nina Morrison (judge) (born 1970), judge of the United States District Court for the Eastern District of New York
- Richard T. Morrison (born 1967), judge of the United States Tax Court
- Sarah D. Morrison (born 1970), judge of the United States District Court for the Southern District of Ohio

== See also ==
- Justice Morrison (disambiguation)
