= Philip Sorensen =

American politician

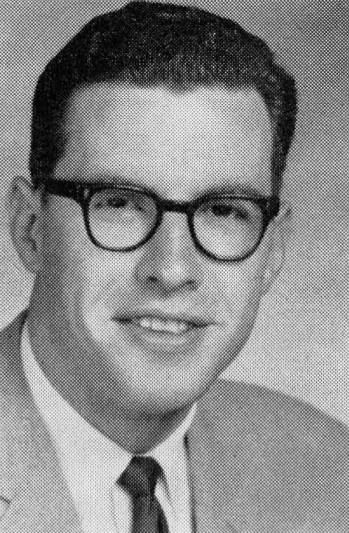

27th Lieutenant Governor of Nebraska
- In office January 7, 1965 – January 5, 1967
- Governor: Frank B. Morrison
- Preceded by: Dwight Burney
- Succeeded by: John Everroad

Personal details
- Born: Philip Chaikin Sorensen; August 31, 1933 Lincoln, Nebraska, U.S.
- Died: February 12, 2017 (aged 83) Columbus, Ohio, U.S.
- Party: Democratic
- Spouse: Janice Lichtenberger (m. 1958)
- Parent(s): Christian A. Sorensen; Annis Chaikin Sorensen
- Relatives: Ted Sorensen (brother)

Philip Chaikin Sorensen (August 31, 1933 – February 12, 2017) was an American politician and law professor. He was the 27th lieutenant governor of Nebraska from 1965 to 1967.

== Early life and education ==
Sorensen was born in Lincoln, Nebraska. He was the son of Christian A. Sorensen, a Danish American who was Nebraska Attorney General (1929–33), and Annis (Chaikin) Sorensen, who was of Russian Jewish descent. He earned both his undergraduate and law degrees from the University of Nebraska. Sorensen was admitted to the bar in Nebraska, Indiana, and Washington.

== Political career ==
Sorensen was elected lieutenant governor in the 1964 election, defeating Republican Charles Thone (who later served in the US Congress and as governor). He then ran for governor in 1966, but was defeated by Republican Norbert Tiemann.

== Later career ==
Sorensen became a law professor at the Ohio State University. Courses he taught included: Torts, Business Organizations, Federal Income Tax, Legislation, and Nonprofit Organizations.

== Personal life ==
In 1958, Sorensen married Janice Lichtenberger in Lincoln, Nebraska. They have four children and five grandchildren.

Sorensen, a sculptor for many years, displays his work at somesculpture.com

Sorensen died on February 12, 2017, at home in Columbus, Ohio.

Party political offices
Preceded by Rudolph D. Andersen	Democratic nominee for Lieutenant Governor of Nebraska; 1964	Succeeded by Ross H. Rasmussen
Preceded by Frank B. Morrison	Democratic nominee for Governor of Nebraska; 1966	Succeeded by J. James Exon
Political offices
Preceded by Dwight Burney	Lieutenant Governor of Nebraska; 1965–1967	Succeeded by John Everroad
