= Christian A. Sorensen =

American lawyer and politician

19th Nebraska Attorney General
- In office 1929–1933
- Governor: Arthur J. Weaver; Charles W. Bryan
- Preceded by: Ora S. Spillman
- Succeeded by: Paul F. Good

Personal details
- Born: Christian Abraham Sorensen; March 24, 1890 Harrisburg, Nebraska, U.S.
- Died: August 25, 1959 (aged 69) Lincoln, Nebraska, U.S.
- Party: Republican
- Spouse: Annis Chaikin (m. 1921)
- Children: 5, including Ted and Philip
- Education: Grand Island Baptist College; University of Nebraska

Christian Abraham Sorensen (March 24, 1890 – August 25, 1959) was an American lawyer and politician.

== Early life ==
Sorensen was born in Harrisburg, Nebraska. Sorensen graduated from Loup City High School in Loup City, Nebraska in 1909. He went to Grand Island Baptist College in Grand Island, Nebraska from 1909 to 1912. Sorensen received his bachelor's and law degrees from University of Nebraska in 1913 and 1916.

== Career ==
Sorensen served as the Nebraska Attorney General from 1929 to 1933 and was a Republican. He was also a co-writer with Myrtle Keegan, in 1917 on a book about legislative procedures in the Nebraska Legislature. He practiced law in Lincoln, Nebraska.

== Personal life ==
Sorensen lived in Lincoln, Nebraska with his wife Annis (Chalkin) and his sons Philip Sorensen and Ted Sorensen. His son, Theodore (Ted) was an advisor to U.S. President John F. Kennedy and his son, Philip served as Nebraska's lieutenant governor from 1965-1967. Sorensen and his wife also had one daughter and two other sons. Sorensen died in Lincoln, Nebraska in 1959.
