= Canaan Township, Gasconade County, Missouri =

Township in the U.S. state of Missouri

Coordinates: 38.3680503°N 91.4424245°W

Canaan Township is an unincorporated and inactive township in Gasconade County, in the U.S. state of Missouri. Established in 1846, the township is located halfway between Owensville and Bland on Missouri Route 28. Red Oak Creek also passes near the township.

== Transportation ==
Canaan is located roughly halfway between U.S. Route 50 and Interstate 44, with the town about 12 miles away from each of the two highway as the crow flies. The closest commercial airports are Waynesville-St. Robert Regional Airport, Columbia Regional Airport and St. Louis Lambert International Airport, though some non commercial airports such as Rolla National Airport and Jefferson City Memorial Airport are closer.
