= 1948 Nebraska gubernatorial election =

- November 2, 1948
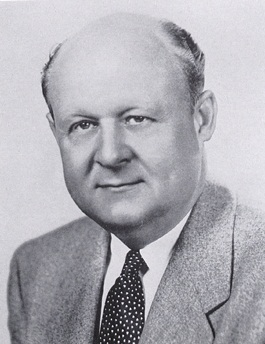

| Nominee | Val Peterson | Frank Sorrell |
| Party | Republican | Democratic |
| Popular vote | 286,119 | 190,214 |
| Percentage | 60.07% | 39.93% |
- County results Peterson: 50–60% 60–70% 70–80% Sorrell: 50–60% 60–70%
Governor before election
Val Peterson
Republican
Elected Governor
Val Peterson
Republican

The 1948 Nebraska gubernatorial election was held on November 2, 1948, and featured incumbent Governor Val Peterson, a Republican, defeating Democratic nominee, former state Senator Frank Sorrell, to win a second two-year term in office.

== Democratic primary ==
=== Candidates ===
- Frank Sorrell, former member of the Nebraska Legislature

=== Results ===
Democratic primary results
| Party | Candidate | Votes | % |
|---|---|---|---|
| Democratic | Frank Sorrell | 69,492 | 99.93 |
| Democratic | Write-in | 51 | 0.07 |

== Republican primary ==
=== Candidates ===
- Roland Max Anderson
- Lloyd M. Ewing
- Val Peterson, incumbent Governor
- Andrew E. Swanson
- Arthur B. Walker, physician and candidate in the Republican primaries for governor in 1946 and lieutenant governor in 1938

=== Results ===
Republican primary results
| Party | Candidate | Votes | % |
|---|---|---|---|
| Republican | Val Peterson (incumbent) | 138,647 | 81.15 |
| Republican | Andrew E. Swanson | 11,235 | 6.58 |
| Republican | Roland Max Anderson | 10,244 | 6.0 |
| Republican | Arthur B. Walker | 6,761 | 3.96 |
| Republican | Lloyd M. Ewing | 3,997 | 2.34 |

== General election ==
=== Results ===
Nebraska gubernatorial election, 1948
| Party | Candidate | Votes | % |
|---|---|---|---|
| Republican | Val Peterson (incumbent) | 286,119 | 60.07% |
| Democratic | Frank Sorrell | 190,214 | 39.93% |
| Write-in | Others | 19 | >0.01% |
| Total votes | | 476,352 | 100.0% |
| Republican hold | | | |

==== By County ====
By county

| County | Person Democratic | | Person Republican | | Various candidates Other parties | | Margin | | Total votes |
| County | # | % | # | % | # | % | # | % | Total votes |
|---|---|---|---|---|---|---|---|---|---|
| Adams County | | | | | | | | | |
| Antelope County | | | | | | | | | |
| Arthur County | | | | | | | | | |
| Banner County | | | | | | | | | |
| Blaine County | | | | | | | | | |
| Boone County | | | | | | | | | |
| Box Butte County | | | | | | | | | |
| Boyd County | | | | | | | | | |
| Brown County | | | | | | | | | |
| Buffalo County | | | | | | | | | |
| Burt County | | | | | | | | | |
| Butler County | | | | | | | | | |
| Cass County | | | | | | | | | |
| Cedar County | | | | | | | | | |
| Chase County | | | | | | | | | |
| Cherry County | | | | | | | | | |
| Cheyenne County | | | | | | | | | |
| Clay County | | | | | | | | | |
| Colfax County | | | | | | | | | |
| Cuming County | | | | | | | | | |
| Custer County | | | | | | | | | |
| Dakota County | | | | | | | | | |
| Dawes County | | | | | | | | | |
| Dawson County | | | | | | | | | |
| Deuel County | | | | | | | | | |
| Dixon County | | | | | | | | | |
| Dodge County | | | | | | | | | |
| Douglas County | | | | | | | | | |
| Dundy County | | | | | | | | | |
| Fillmore County | | | | | | | | | |
| Franklin County | | | | | | | | | |
| Frontier County | | | | | | | | | |
| Furnas County | | | | | | | | | |
| Gage County | | | | | | | | | |
| Garden County | | | | | | | | | |
| Garfield County | | | | | | | | | |
| Gosper County | | | | | | | | | |
| Grant County | | | | | | | | | |
| Greeley County | | | | | | | | | |
| Hall County | | | | | | | | | |
| Hamilton County | | | | | | | | | |
| Hayes County | | | | | | | | | |
| Hitchcock County | | | | | | | | | |
| Holt County | | | | | | | | | |
| Hooker County | | | | | | | | | |
| Howard County | | | | | | | | | |
| Jefferson County | | | | | | | | | |
| Johnson County | | | | | | | | | |
| Kearney County | | | | | | | | | |
| Keith County | | | | | | | | | |
| Keya Paha County | | | | | | | | | |
| Kimball County | | | | | | | | | |
| Knox County | | | | | | | | | |
| Lancaster County | | | | | | | | | |
| Lincoln County | | | | | | | | | |
| Logan County | | | | | | | | | |
| Loup County | | | | | | | | | |
| Madison County | | | | | | | | | |
| McPherson County | | | | | | | | | |
| Merrick County | | | | | | | | | |
| Morrill County | | | | | | | | | |
| Nance County | | | | | | | | | |
| Nance County | | | | | | | | | |
| Nemaha County | | | | | | | | | |
| Nuckolls County | | | | | | | | | |
| Otoe County | | | | | | | | | |
| Pawnee County | | | | | | | | | |
| Perkins County | | | | | | | | | |
| Phelps County | | | | | | | | | |
| Pierce County | | | | | | | | | |
| Platte County | | | | | | | | | |
| Polk County | | | | | | | | | |
| Red Willow County | | | | | | | | | |
| Richardson County | | | | | | | | | |
| Rock County | | | | | | | | | |
| Saline County | | | | | | | | | |
| Sarpy County | | | | | | | | | |
| Saunders County | | | | | | | | | |
| Scotts Bluff County | | | | | | | | | |
| Seward County | | | | | | | | | |
| Sheridan County | | | | | | | | | |
| Sioux County | | | | | | | | | |
| Stanton County | | | | | | | | | |
| Thayer County | | | | | | | | | |
| Stanton County | | | | | | | | | |
| Thurston County | | | | | | | | | |
| Valley County | | | | | | | | | |
| Washington County | | | | | | | | | |
| Wayne County | | | | | | | | | |
| Webster County | | | | | | | | | |
| Wheeler County | | | | | | | | | |
| York County | | | | | | | | | |
| Totals | | | | | | | | | |

== See also ==
- 1948 Nebraska lieutenant gubernatorial election
