= Frank B. Morrison =

American politician (1905–2004)

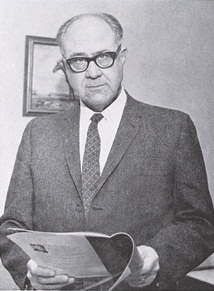
- Gov. Frank Morrison, 1961

31st Governor of Nebraska
- In office January 5, 1961 – January 5, 1967
- Lieutenant: Dwight Burney; Philip Sorensen
- Preceded by: Dwight Burney
- Succeeded by: Norbert Tiemann

Personal details
- Born: Frank Brenner Morrison; May 20, 1905 Golden, Colorado, U.S.
- Died: April 19, 2004 (aged 98) McCook, Nebraska, U.S.
- Party: Democratic
- Spouse: Maxine Elizabeth Hepp
- Children: 3
- Education: Kansas State University

Frank Brenner Morrison (May 20, 1905 – April 19, 2004) was an American politician and attorney who served as the 31st governor of Nebraska from 1961 to 1967, representing the Democratic Party.

== Early life and education ==
Morrison was born in Golden, Colorado, and attended high school in Manhattan, Kansas. He graduated from Kansas State University in 1927, where he was a member of Tau Kappa Epsilon fraternity. Accepting an invitation from an aunt, he moved to Lincoln, Nebraska and attended the University of Nebraska College of Law and earned a law degree in 1931.

== Career ==
Morrison began his career as a teacher, and was superintendent of schools in Farwell, Nebraska before establishing his legal practice in Stockville, Nebraska. He was elected Frontier County attorney in 1934.

Morrison was a delegate to the Democratic National Convention in 1940, and chair of the Frontier County Democratic Party the same year.

He ran for the U.S. House of Representatives twice in 1948 and 1954, Nebraska lieutenant governor in 1956, and United States Senate three times in 1958, 1966 and 1970, but lost all six elections. He was defeated for the US Senate by Roman L. Hruska in 1958 and 1970 and Carl T. Curtis in 1966.

Morrison secured the Democratic nomination for Governor of Nebraska and won the general election in 1960. He won reelection in 1962 and also in 1964. During his governorship, he worked to improve the University, particularly the scientific research and the agricultural departments, a state employees' retirement plan was initiated, a state income tax was sanctioned, and the state's accounting system was restructured. He signed legislation for Educational Television which led to the establishment of the statewide public television network, an act he said was his most important.

After leaving office, Morrison was appointed in 1968 as food consultant for the U.S. Agency for International Development in India. From 1971 to 1974 he was the Douglas County public defender.

Morrison was the driving force behind the construction of the Great Platte River Road Archway Monument in Kearney, Nebraska. A bust of his face can be seen at the entrance to the monument. The Great Platte River Road Archway Monument gained fame by being featured in the movie About Schmidt with Jack Nicholson. On July 16, 2000, he dedicated the 50,000 square-foot building that arches over Interstate 80.

Morrison wrote an autobiography, My Journey Through the Twentieth Century in 2001. He was a confidant of both Lyndon B. Johnson and John F. Kennedy, and was summoned to the White House immediately after JFK was assassinated.

== Personal life ==
He married Maxine Elizabeth Hepp in 1936 and they had three children, Frank Jr, David Jon, and Jean Marie.

Morrison died in 2004 of cancer in the McCook Community Hospital, McCook, Nebraska, one month short of his 99th birthday. He was cremated.

His son, Frank B. Morrison Jr. (1937–2006) was a justice of the Montana Supreme Court. His grandson, John Morrison, is a former State Auditor of Montana and was a 2006 Senate candidate.

== See also ==
- List of governors of Nebraska

Political offices
Preceded by Dwight Burney	Governor of Nebraska; 1961–1967	Succeeded by Norbert Tiemann
Party political offices
Preceded by Stanley D. Long	Democratic nominee for Lieutenant Governor of Nebraska; 1956	Succeeded by Frank Sorrell
Preceded by James F. Green	Democratic nominee for U.S. Senator (Class 1) from Nebraska; 1958	Succeeded by Raymond Arndt
Preceded by Ralph G. Brooks	Democratic nominee for Governor of Nebraska; 1960, 1962, 1964	Succeeded by Philip Sorensen
Preceded by Robert B. Conrad	Democratic nominee for U.S. Senator (Class 2) from Nebraska; 1966	Succeeded by Terry Carpenter
Preceded by Raymond Arndt	Democratic nominee for U.S. Senator (Class 1) from Nebraska; 1970	Succeeded by Edward Zorinsky
Preceded by Stanley D. Cohen	Democratic nominee for Nebraska Attorney General; 1974	Succeeded by Thomas J. Garvey
