= 1956 Nebraska gubernatorial election =

- November 6, 1956
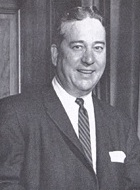

Nominee	Victor Anderson	Frank Sorrell	George Morris
Party	Republican	Democratic	Independent
Popular vote	308,293	228,048	31,583
Percentage	54.28%	40.15%	5.56%
- County results Anderson: 40–50% 50–60% 60–70% 70–80% Sorrell: 40–50% 50–60%
Governor before election
Victor Anderson
Republican
Elected Governor
Victor Anderson
Republican

The 1956 Nebraska gubernatorial election was held on November 6, 1956, and featured incumbent Governor Victor Anderson, a Republican, defeating Democratic nominee, former state Senator Frank Sorrell, as well as independent George Morris, to win a second two-year term in office.

After this, no Republican governor of Nebraska would be re-elected until 2002.

== Democratic primary ==
=== Candidates ===
- Ted Baum
- Frank Sorrell, former member of the Nebraska Legislature

=== Results ===
Democratic primary results
Party	Candidate	Votes	%
Democratic	Frank Sorrell	43,301	69.86
Democratic	Ted Baum	18,667	30.12
Democratic	Write-in	16	0.03

== Republican primary ==
=== Candidates ===
- Victor Anderson, incumbent Governor
- Edwin L. Hart, plastics company owner

=== Results ===
Republican primary results
Party	Candidate	Votes	%
Republican	Victor Anderson (incumbent)	86,168	82.55
Republican	Edwin L. Hart	18,202	17.44
Republican	Write-in	8	0.01

== General election ==
=== Results ===
Nebraska gubernatorial election, 1956
Party	Candidate	Votes	%
Republican	Victor Anderson (incumbent)	308,293	54.28%
Democratic	Frank Sorrell	228,048	40.15%
Independent	George Morris	31,583	5.56%
Write-in	Others	9	>0.01%
Total votes		567,933	100.0%
Republican hold			

==== By County ====
By county

County	Person Democratic		Person Republican		Various candidates Other parties		Margin		Total votes
County	#	%	#	%	#	%	#	%	Total votes
Adams County									
Antelope County									
Arthur County									
Banner County									
Blaine County									
Boone County									
Box Butte County									
Boyd County									
Brown County									
Buffalo County									
Burt County									
Butler County									
Cass County									
Cedar County									
Chase County									
Cherry County									
Cheyenne County									
Clay County									
Colfax County									
Cuming County									
Custer County									
Dakota County									
Dawes County									
Dawson County									
Deuel County									
Dixon County									
Dodge County									
Douglas County									
Dundy County									
Fillmore County									
Franklin County									
Frontier County									
Furnas County									
Gage County									
Garden County									
Garfield County									
Gosper County									
Grant County									
Greeley County									
Hall County									
Hamilton County									
Hayes County									
Hitchcock County									
Holt County									
Hooker County									
Howard County									
Jefferson County									
Johnson County									
Kearney County									
Keith County									
Keya Paha County									
Kimball County									
Knox County									
Lancaster County									
Lincoln County									
Logan County									
Loup County									
Madison County									
McPherson County									
Merrick County									
Morrill County									
Nance County									
Nance County									
Nemaha County									
Nuckolls County									
Otoe County									
Pawnee County									
Perkins County									
Phelps County									
Pierce County									
Platte County									
Polk County									
Red Willow County									
Richardson County									
Rock County									
Saline County									
Sarpy County									
Saunders County									
Scotts Bluff County									
Seward County									
Sheridan County									
Sioux County									
Stanton County									
Thayer County									
Stanton County									
Thurston County									
Valley County									
Washington County									
Wayne County									
Webster County									
Wheeler County									
York County									
Totals									

== See also ==
- 1956 Nebraska lieutenant gubernatorial election
