= Victor Anderson (Nebraska politician) =

American politician

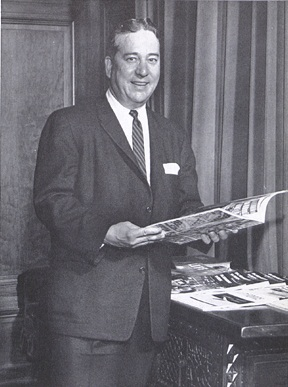
- Gov. Victor Anderson, c. 1958

28th Governor of Nebraska
- In office January 6, 1955 – January 8, 1959
- Lieutenant: Charles J. Warner; Dwight Burney
- Preceded by: Robert B. Crosby
- Succeeded by: Ralph Brooks

37th Mayor of Lincoln
- In office September 11, 1950 – May 18, 1953
- Preceded by: Thomas R. Pansing
- Succeeded by: Clark Jeary

Personal details
- Born: March 30, 1902 Havelock, Nebraska, U.S.
- Died: August 15, 1962 (aged 60) Lincoln, Nebraska, U.S.
- Resting place: Wyuka Cemetery
- Party: Republican
- Spouse: Elizabeth May (m. 1941)
- Children: 1
- Education: University of Nebraska
- Profession: Businessman

Victor Emanuel Anderson (March 30, 1902 – August 15, 1962) was an American politician from the state of Nebraska. A member of the Republican Party, he served in the Nebraska Legislature, as mayor of the capital city of Lincoln, and as the 28th governor of the state.

== Early life and marriage ==
Anderson, the son of Swedish immigrants, Ernest F. and Marie Larson Anderson, was born in Havelock, Nebraska (which was subsequently incorporated into Lincoln). He attended the University of Nebraska after his graduation from Havelock High School in 1920, but left the university two and a half years later to become a partner in his father's plumbing and hardware business.

On December 27, 1941, Anderson was married to Elizabeth (Betty) May; the couple had one son, Roger Lee.

== Political career ==
Anderson assumed his first political position in 1936, when he was appointed a trustee of Lancaster County Sanitary District. No. 1. He was then elected to that position three times.

In 1948, he was elected to a seat in the Nebraska legislature, and took office in 1949. He resigned in 1950 when the Lincoln City Council unanimously chose him to fill the vacated post of mayor. Running for reelection in 1951, he won by a large majority. While he was in office, Lincoln Air Force Base was re-activated, the city charter was amended, the "O" street viaduct was replaced, and, for the first time in fifteen years, street resurfacing was done.

Anderson sought the Republican nomination to run for governor in 1952, but lost in the primary. In 1954, he again ran for the governorship, this time winning. He was reelected by a large majority in 1956. During his tenure, taxes and expenditures were reduced, mental health programs were improved, and a prison riot was successfully calmed. He sought a third term in 1958, but lost to Democratic candidate Ralph Brooks, in what was then the closest election in Nebraska history.

In 1959, U.S. president Dwight D. Eisenhower chose Anderson as a U.S. delegate to the NATO-sponsored Atlantic Congress in London, England. He was a delegate to the 1960 Republican National Convention.

== Business ==
In 1949, Anderson bought the controlling interest in the Havelock National Bank and was named president. He held that position until his death. In 1949, he also began the Victor E. Anderson Bottled Gas and Propane Company.

== Death and legacy ==
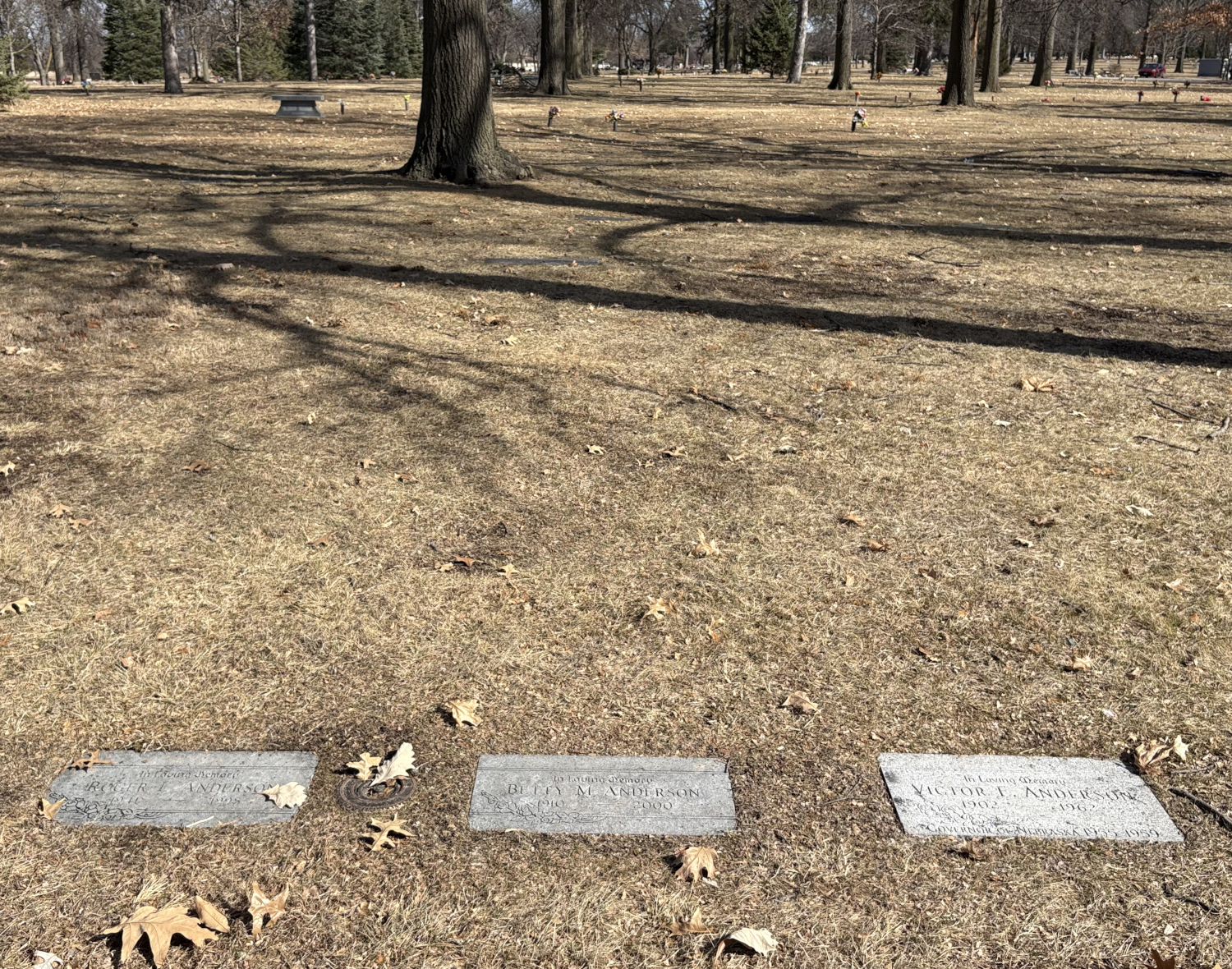
Anderson's grave at Wyuka Cemetery

Anderson died of a heart attack in Lincoln on August 15, 1962, and was interred at Wyuka Cemetery within the city. He belonged to the Freemasons, the Elks, the Moose, the Odd fellows and Sigma Phi Epsilon, and was a member of the Methodist church.

A library in the Lincoln City Libraries system is named after Anderson.

Party political offices
Preceded by Robert B. Crosby	Republican nominee for Governor of Nebraska; 1954, 1956, 1958	Succeeded by John R. Cooper
Political offices
Preceded by Henry P. Heiliger	Nebraska State Senator - District 18; 1949 - 1950	Succeeded by Otto H. Liebers
Preceded by Thomas R. Pansing	Mayor of Lincoln, Nebraska; 1950–1953	Succeeded by Clark Jeary
Preceded by Robert B. Crosby	Governor of Nebraska; 1955–1959	Succeeded by Ralph Brooks
