= Charles J. Warner =

American politician

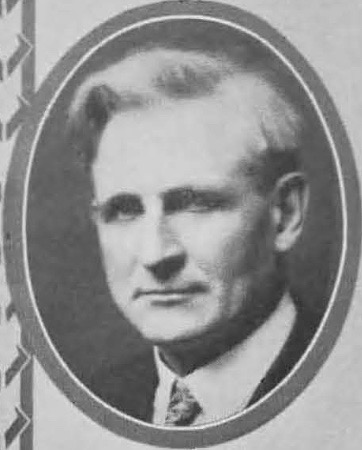

25th Lieutenant Governor of Nebraska
- In office January 6, 1949 – September 24, 1955
- Governor: Val Peterson; Robert B. Crosby; Victor Anderson
- Preceded by: Robert B. Crosby
- Succeeded by: Dwight Burney

1st Speaker of the Nebraska Legislature
- In office 1937–1939
- Preceded by: Position established
- Succeeded by: William H. Diers

Member of the Nebraska Legislature
- In office 1937–1939

Member of the Nebraska House of Representatives
- In office 1901–1907

Member of the Nebraska Senate
- In office 1919–1937

Personal details
- Born: March 29, 1875 Lancaster County, Nebraska
- Died: September 24, 1955 (aged 80) Lincoln, Nebraska
- Party: Republican

Charles Joseph Warner (March 29, 1875 – September 24, 1955) was an American politician in the U.S. state of Nebraska. He served for four terms as the 25th lieutenant governor of Nebraska, from 1949 to 1955. Before that, he was a state legislator for twenty-six years and served as the first speaker of Nebraska's unicameral legislature.

Warner was born in Lancaster County, Nebraska in 1875. He graduated from the University of Nebraska in 1899 and Columbian Law School in Washington, D.C. in 1902.

He served in the Nebraska House of Representatives from 1901 to 1907, the Nebraska Senate from 1919 to 1937, and the new unicameral legislature from 1937 to 1939. He made three unsuccessful attempts to run for governor, including against incumbent Gov. Robert Leroy Cochran in 1938.

Warner was also a farmer and cattle breeder. He died at a hospital in Lincoln on September 24, 1955, during his fourth term as Lieutenant Governor.

His son, Jerome Warner, was a state legislator from 1963 to 1997, and also served as speaker from 1969 to 1971.

Political offices
New title	Speaker of the Nebraska Legislature; 1937–1939	Succeeded by William H. Diers
Preceded by Robert B. Crosby	Lieutenant Governor of Nebraska; 1949–1955	Succeeded by Dwight Burney
Party political offices
Preceded by Dwight Griswold	Republican nominee for Governor of Nebraska; 1938	Succeeded by Dwight Griswold
