= John Everroad =

American politician

28th Lieutenant Governor of Nebraska
- In office January 5, 1967 – January 7, 1971
- Governor: Norbert Tiemann
- Preceded by: Philip Sorensen
- Succeeded by: Frank Marsh

Personal details
- Born: January 13, 1913 Columbus, Indiana, U.S.
- Died: August 2, 1984 (aged 71) Omaha, Nebraska, U.S.
- Party: Republican
- Spouse: Ruby Baker (1936-1984, his death)
- Education: Franklin College

John Everett Everroad (January 13, 1913 – August 2, 1984) was a Nebraska politician who served as the 28th lieutenant governor of Nebraska from 1967 to 1971.

== Biography ==
John Everett Everroad was born in Columbus, Indiana January 13, 1913. He is the son of Griffa Everroad and Margaret Quinn. Everett graduated from Columbus High School and studied at Franklin College in Franklin, Indiana, for two years. He moved to Nebraska in 1952. He was elected lieutenant governor in November 1966 and served from 1967 to 1971.

Everroad married Rubye Marie Baker November 6, 1936, in Ector County, Texas. He died August 2, 1984, at Omaha, Nebraska, buried at Forest Lawn Memorial Park.

Party political offices
Preceded by Charles Thone	Republican nominee for Lieutenant Governor of Nebraska; 1966	Succeeded by Frank Marsh
Political offices
Preceded by Philip Sorensen	Lieutenant Governor of Nebraska; 1967–1971	Succeeded by Frank Marsh
