= Norbert Tiemann =

American politician (1924–2012)

Administrator of the Federal Highway Administration
- In office June 1, 1973 – March 31, 1977
- President: Richard Nixon; Gerald Ford; Jimmy Carter
- Preceded by: Francis Turner
- Succeeded by: William M. Cox

32nd Governor of Nebraska
- In office January 5, 1967 – January 7, 1971
- Lieutenant: John Everroad
- Preceded by: Frank B. Morrison
- Succeeded by: J. James Exon

Personal details
- Born: Norbert Theodore Tiemann; July 18, 1924 Minden, Nebraska, U.S.
- Died: June 19, 2012 (aged 87) Dallas, Texas, U.S.
- Party: Republican
- Spouses: Lorna Lou Bornholdt (m. 1950; div. 1985) Judith Alexander (née Manes) (m. 1987)
- Children: Amy Elieen; Lorna Christine; Mary Catherine; Norbert Jr.

Norbert Theodore "Nobby" Tiemann (July 18, 1924 – June 19, 2012) was an American Republican politician from Wausa, Nebraska, and was the 32nd governor of Nebraska, serving from 1967 to 1971.

== Biography ==
Tiemann was born in Minden, Nebraska. He attended Campbell High School in Campbell, Nebraska, graduating in 1942. He served in the U.S. Army during World War II. After the war he attended the University of Nebraska where he was a member of the Society of Innocents and Beta Sigma Psi fraternity. Tiemann graduated in 1949 with a B.S. degree. He married Lorna L. Bornholdt on July 19, 1950, and they had four children: Amy Eileen, Lorna Christine, Mary Catherine, and Norbert Jr.

=== Career ===
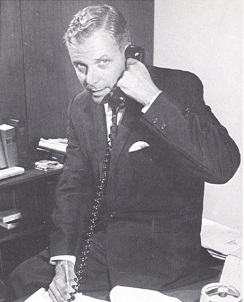
Tiemann in 1967

Tiemann then served in Korea from 1950-1952. After returning to the U.S., Tiemann served three terms as mayor of Wausa, Nebraska.

In 1966, Tiemann was elected Governor of Nebraska as a member of the Republican Party. He successfully pushed for a number of progressive changes, including the adoption of a new tax structure and of new programs of state financial aid to education, the expansion of the University of Nebraska, and the enactment of the state's first minimum wage law and of open-housing legislation. He served one term and was defeated in a bid for reelection by J. James Exon. The state centennial year coincided with his term and at the end of the centennial year, the legislature had passed 632 bills, a new state record.

Tiemann was on the National Governors' Conference Executive Committee from 1968 to 1969. From June 1, 1973, to January 1977 he served as head of the U.S. Department of Transportation's Federal Highway Administration.

=== Death ===
Tiemann died at his home in Dallas, Texas, on June 19, 2012, aged 87.

Party political offices
Preceded by Dwight Burney	Republican nominee for Governor of Nebraska; 1966, 1970	Succeeded by Richard D. Marvel
Political offices
Preceded by Frank B. Morrison	Governor of Nebraska; 1967–1971	Succeeded by J. James Exon
