= Ralph Brooks =

American politician

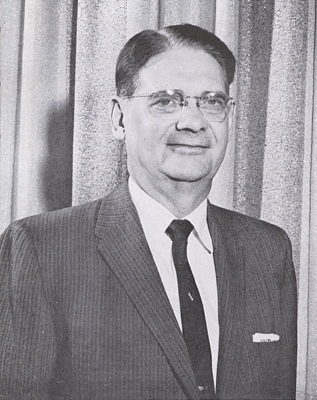
- Ralph G. Brooks, c. 1959

29th Governor of Nebraska
- In office January 8, 1959 – September 9, 1960
- Lieutenant: Dwight Burney
- Preceded by: Victor Anderson
- Succeeded by: Dwight Burney

Personal details
- Born: Ralph Gilmour Brooks; July 6, 1898 Eustis, Nebraska, U.S.
- Died: September 9, 1960 (aged 62) Lincoln, Nebraska, U.S.
- Party: Democratic
- Spouse: Darleene L. Day
- Children: 1
- Education: Nebraska Wesleyan University; University of Nebraska College of Law

Ralph Gilmour Brooks (July 6, 1898 – September 9, 1960) was an American Democratic politician who served as the 29th governor of Nebraska.

== Early life ==
Brooks was born in Eustis, Nebraska. His father was a farmer and operated a store. Brooks' family lived in Kearney, Elm Creek, and Sargent during his childhood. He graduated from Sargent High School in 1916, and taught in Cherry and Custer County Schools.

Brooks enrolled in Nebraska Wesleyan University in 1920, and earned many debate honors. He won the National Oratorical Peace Contest in 1923. He was a member of the College Council, Theta Chi, assistant editor of the college paper, and employed by the State Highway Department as associate editor of the department magazine. After graduating in 1925, he attended the University of Nebraska College of Law and was admitted to the state bar in 1930.

== Career ==
While teaching at Hartington, Nebraska, Brooks earned a Master of Arts in school administration in 1932 from the University of Nebraska–Lincoln. He served at a number of high schools in Nebraska and Iowa, and married Darleene L. Day on December 24, 1934. The couple had one child.

In 1942, he sought and won the Democratic nomination for Congress in the first district, but lost to the Republican, Carl Curtis, in the general election. Moving to McCook, Nebraska, in 1946, he became Superintendent of Schools and President of McCook Junior College.

Winning the Democratic nomination, Brooks was elected Governor of Nebraska by popular vote on November 4, 1958. While he was in office, he promoted industrial growth, endorsed a traffic safety program, and fought for accelerated Interstate Highway construction.

In 1960, Brooks ran for Nebraska's Senate Seat held by Carl Curtis, Brooks won the primary, defeating Clair Armstrong Callan, but died on September 9, 1960, at the age of 62.

== Death ==
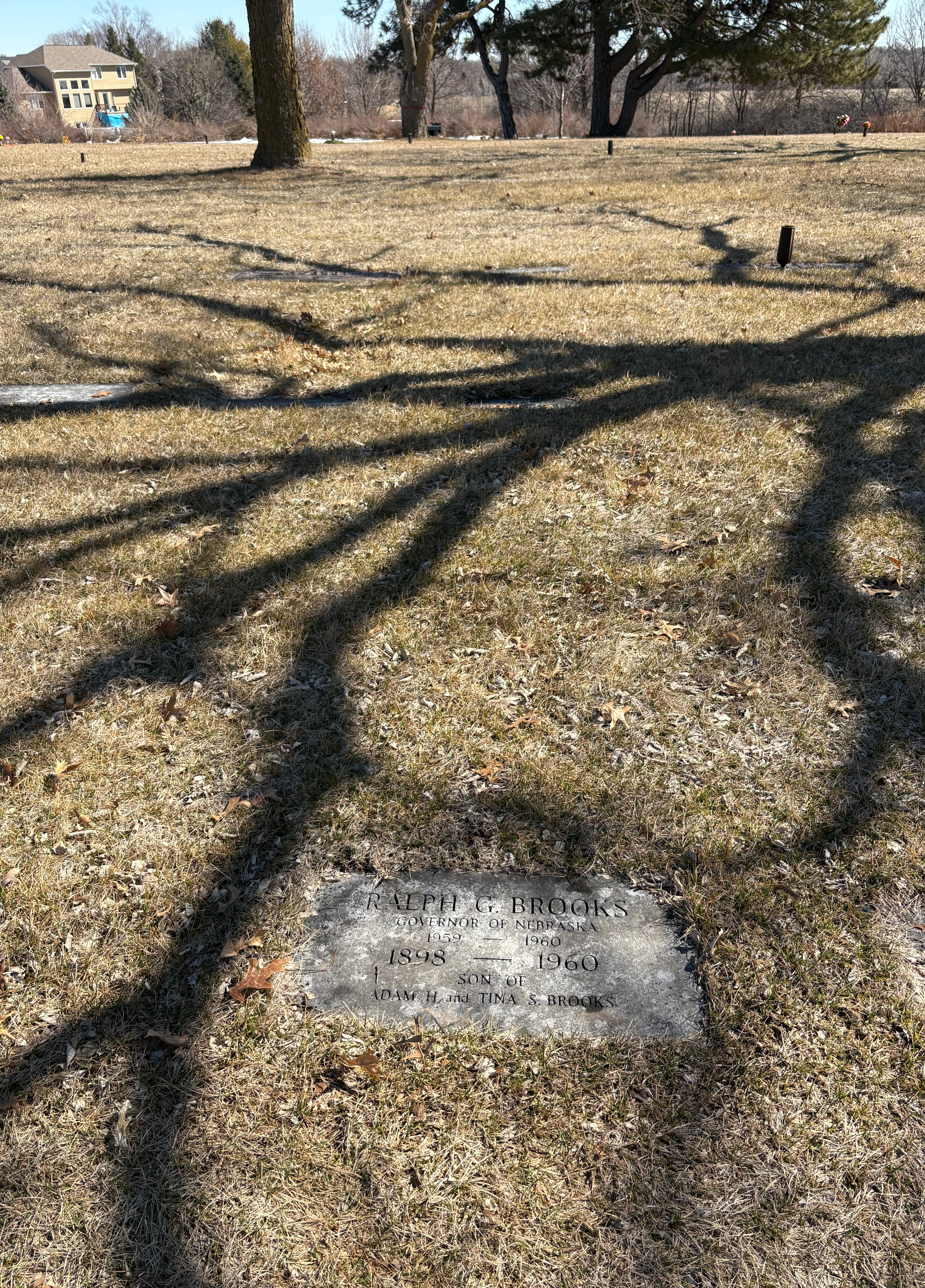
Brooks' grave at Lincoln Memorial Park

While still in office, Brooks died on September 9, 1960. He was buried at Lincoln Memorial Park.

Party political offices
Preceded by Frank Sorrell	Democratic nominee for Governor of Nebraska; 1958	Succeeded by Frank B. Morrison
Preceded by Keith Neville	Democratic nominee for U.S. Senator (Class 2) from Nebraska; 1960	Succeeded by Robert B. Conrad
Political offices
Preceded by Victor Anderson	Governor of Nebraska; 1959–1960	Succeeded by Dwight Burney
