= Val Peterson =

American politician and diplomat

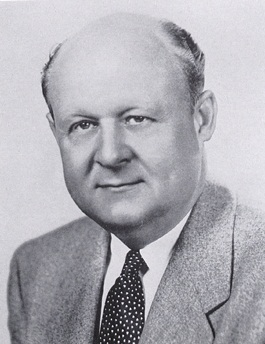

United States Ambassador to Finland
- In office July 14, 1969 – March 23, 1973
- President: Richard Nixon
- Preceded by: Tyler Thompson
- Succeeded by: John Krehbiel

United States Ambassador to Denmark
- In office August 22, 1957 – February 21, 1961
- President: Dwight D. Eisenhower; John F. Kennedy
- Preceded by: Robert Coe
- Succeeded by: William McCormick Blair Jr.

Administrator of the Federal Civil Defense Administration
- In office February 19, 1953 – June 14, 1957; Acting: February 19, 1953 – March 4, 1953
- President: Dwight D. Eisenhower
- Preceded by: James Jeremiah Wadsworth (Acting)
- Succeeded by: Lewis Berry (Acting)

Chair of the National Governors Association
- In office September 30, 1951 – June 29, 1952
- Preceded by: Frank Lausche
- Succeeded by: Allan Shivers

26th Governor of Nebraska
- In office January 9, 1947 – January 8, 1953
- Lieutenant: Robert B. Crosby; Charles J. Warner
- Preceded by: Dwight Griswold
- Succeeded by: Robert B. Crosby

Personal details
- Born: Frederick Valdemar Erastus Peterson; July 18, 1903 Oakland, Nebraska, U.S.
- Died: October 17, 1983 (aged 80) Fremont, Nebraska, U.S.
- Party: Republican
- Education: Wayne State College (BA); University of Nebraska (MA)

Frederick Valdemar Erastus Peterson (July 18, 1903 – October 17, 1983) was an American politician and diplomat who served as the 26th governor of Nebraska from 1947 to 1953.A member of the Republican Party, he also served in World War II as a Lieutenant Colonel in the United States Army Air Forces. Later, he would serve as the Administrator of the Federal an ambassador under three different Presidential administrations.

Peterson won three terms as Governor of Nebraska. He first won in 1946, winning a crowded primary to succeed outgoing Governor Dwight Griswold and then defeating Democrat Frank Sorrell in a landslide, garnering 65.5% of the vote. He defeated Sorrell again in 1948 in a slightly closer victory (Yet still by over 20 percentage points) and comfortably won a third term over Walter Raecke in 1950. He was chair of the National Governors Association from 1951 to 1952,

Instead of running for a fourth term in 1952, Peterson unsuccessfully challenged Hugh A. Butler in the concurrent election for the United States Senate. He would lose the primary by 15 points. He was succeeded as Governor by Robert B. Crosby. After leaving office, newly elected President Dwight D. Eisenhower nominated Peterson to serve as the Administrator of the Federal Civil Defense Administration. He would later serve as the Ambassador to Denmark under Eisenhower and John F. Kennedy and Ambassador to Finland under Richard Nixon.

== Early life and education ==
Peterson was born in Oakland, Nebraska, the son of Henry C. Peterson and Hermanda (Swanberg) Peterson. He received his Bachelor of Arts degree from Wayne State Teachers College and a Master of Arts degree in political science from the University of Nebraska. Following 1933, Peterson maintained his permanent residence in Elgin, Nebraska.

== Career ==
Peterson worked as a teacher, school administrator, and newspaper man. He was the Elgin superintendent of schools and was the publisher of The Elgin Review for ten years. During World War II he served as lieutenant colonel in the United States Army Air Forces.

Peterson first entered politics as the campaign manager for the Hugh Butler 1940 U.S. senatorial bid. He also was the administrative assistant and secretary to Governor Dwight Griswold from 1941 to 1942. Peterson next secured the Republican gubernatorial nomination, and was elected governor in November 1946. He was reelected to a second term in 1948, and to a third term in 1950.

During his tenure, the Missouri River basin development was endorsed and highway revenue initiatives were sought. Also during Peterson's term, he chaired the State Governors Conference and presided over the Council of State Governments in 1952. In December 1951, Governor Peterson appointed Fred Andrew Seaton to the U.S. Senate to fill the vacancy caused by the death of Kenneth S. Wherry.

Peterson served in the Dwight D. Eisenhower administration as director of the Federal Civil Defense Administration from 1953 to 1957. As Federal Civil Defense Administrator, Peterson is reputed to have speculated about the possibility of creating a cobalt doomsday bomb. Peterson served as U.S. ambassador to Denmark, from 1957 to 1961 and U.S. ambassador to Finland, from 1969 to 1973.

== Death ==
Peterson died October 17, 1983, in Fremont, Nebraska, reportedly of respiratory failure following a struggle with Alzheimer's disease. He is interred at Oakdale Cemetery, Oakdale, Nebraska.

== Legacy ==
The Peterson Fine Arts building at his alma mater, Wayne State College, was named in his honor. A variety of autographed photographs representing his political career (particularly a full Eisenhower Cabinet photo with autographs of each member, as well as a personally inscribed color photograph of Richard Nixon) were on display for many years at the Wayne State library. However, the photos began to deteriorate due to exposure, and had to be removed; they are still in the possession of the college.

== Further sources ==
- "Peterson, (Frederick) Val(demar Erastus)" in Current Biography 1949.

Party political offices
Preceded by Dwight Griswold	Republican nominee for Governor of Nebraska; 1946, 1948, 1950	Succeeded by Robert B. Crosby
Political offices
Preceded by Dwight Griswold	Governor of Nebraska; 1947–1953	Succeeded by Robert B. Crosby
Preceded by Frank Lausche	Chair of the National Governors Association; 1951–1952	Succeeded by Allan Shivers
Preceded by James Jeremiah Wadsworth; Acting	Administrator of the Federal Civil Defense Administration; 1953–1957	Succeeded by Lewis Berry; Acting
Diplomatic posts
Preceded by Robert Coe	United States Ambassador to Denmark; 1957–1961	Succeeded by William McCormick Blair Jr.
Preceded by Tyler Thompson	United States Ambassador to Finland; 1969–1973	Succeeded by John Krehbiel
