= Dwight Burney =

American politician from Nebraska (1892–1987)

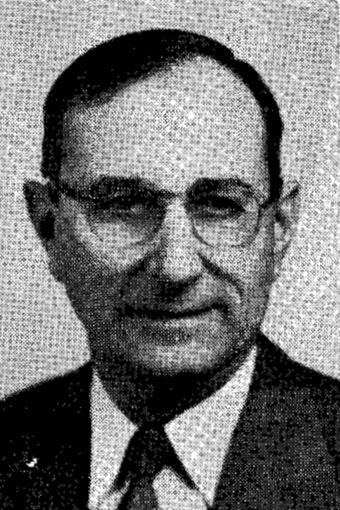

30th Governor of Nebraska
- In office September 9, 1960 – January 5, 1961
- Preceded by: Ralph Brooks
- Succeeded by: Frank B. Morrison

26th Lieutenant Governor of Nebraska
- In office January 3, 1957 – January 7, 1965; Acting: September 24, 1955 – January 1, 1957
- Governor: Victor Anderson (1957–1959); Ralph Brooks (1959–1960); Frank B. Morrison (1961–1965)
- Preceded by: Charles J. Warner
- Succeeded by: Philip Sorensen

11th Speaker of the Nebraska Legislature
- In office January 4, 1955 – January 1, 1957
- Preceded by: Charles F. Tvrdik
- Succeeded by: John Beaver

Member of the Nebraska Legislature from the 14th district
- In office January 2, 1945 – January 1, 1957
- Preceded by: Martin Mischke
- Succeeded by: Jules Burbach

Personal details
- Born: January 7, 1892 Hartington, Nebraska
- Died: March 10, 1987 (aged 95) Mesa, Arizona
- Party: Republican
- Education: University of South Dakota

Dwight Willard Burney (January 7, 1892 – March 10, 1987) was an American politician from the state of Nebraska. A Republican, he served as the 30th governor of Nebraska from 1960 to 1961.

== Early life and career ==
Burney was born in Hartington, Nebraska, the son of Willard H. Burney, a Representative in the Nebraska legislature in 1919. He attended rural schools and graduated from the University of South Dakota in 1912. After graduation, he taught in high schools, farmed and ranched. For 25 years, he was director of the Hartington rural schools.

== Political career ==
Burney was elected a member of the Nebraska Unicameral in 1945 and won re-election until 1957. He served as Speaker during that time. In 1955, upon the death of Lieutenant Governor Charles J. Warner, Burney became acting Lieutenant Governor. He was elected Lieutenant Governor in his own right in 1956 and was re-elected in 1958. On September 9, 1960, following the death of Governor Ralph Brooks, Burney became governor. During his tenure, a state sales tax was promoted, and controversy over the firing of Jack Obblick, the Director of State Aeronautics, was handled. He was governor of Nebraska until the inauguration of Gov. Frank B. Morrison in 1961, and continued as lieutenant governor until 1965.

In a controversial move on June 27, 1961, while Nebraska Governor Frank B. Morrison, a Democrat, was attending a conference in Hawaii, Burney, at that time the lieutenant governor and a Republican, appointed Eugene T. Mahoney, also a Republican, to a seat in the Nebraska Legislature to fill a vacancy created by the resignation of Senator John P. Munnelly. (At that time, the offices of Nebraska Governor and Nebraska Lieutenant Governor were elected independently, which enabled those offices to be held simultaneously by individuals of differing political parties.) While controversial, Burney's actions were nonetheless legal since, by the absence of Governor Morrison from the state, Burney was considered "Acting Governor" by Article IV, Section 16, of the Nebraska Constitution at the time and could exercise the full powers of the governor's office, including the appointment of legislators to fill vacancies.

== Later life ==
Burney's wife Edna died in 1962, and he married Grayce Hahn of Polk, Nebraska on January 1, 1965. Burney and Grayce made their home in Polk. Burney died in his winter home in Mesa, Arizona, on March 10, 1987. He is interred at Hartington, Nebraska. He was a Freemason.

Political offices
| Preceded by Charles J. Warner | Lieutenant Governor of Nebraska; January 10, 1957 – January 7, 1965; Acting: September 24, 1955 – January 1, 1957 | Succeeded by Philip Sorensen |
| Preceded by Ralph Brooks | Governor of Nebraska; September 9, 1960 – January 5, 1961 | Succeeded by Frank B. Morrison |
Party political offices
| Preceded by Charles J. Warner | Republican nominee for Lieutenant Governor of Nebraska; 1956, 1958, 1960, 1962 | Succeeded by Charles Thone |
| Preceded by Fred A. Seaton | Republican nominee for Governor of Nebraska; 1964 | Succeeded by Norbert Tiemann |
