= 1946 Nebraska gubernatorial election =

- November 5, 1946
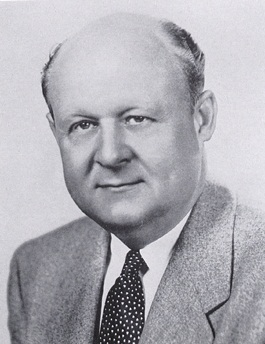

Nominee	Val Peterson	Frank Sorrell
Party	Republican	Democratic
Popular vote	249,468	131,367
Percentage	65.51%	34.49%
- County results Peterson: 50–60% 60–70% 70–80% 80–90% Sorrell: 50–60%
Governor before election
Dwight Griswold
Republican
Elected Governor
Val Peterson
Republican

The 1946 Nebraska gubernatorial election was held on November 5, 1946, and featured former school superintendent and newspaper publisher Val Peterson, a Republican, defeating Democratic nominee, state Senator Frank Sorrell.

== Democratic primary ==
=== Candidates ===
- Samuel K. Howard, laundry route supervisor
- Frank Sorrell, member of the Nebraska Legislature

=== Results ===
Democratic primary results
Party	Candidate	Votes	%
Democratic	Frank Sorrell	34,636	68.88
Democratic	Samuel K. Howard	15,652	31.12

== Republican primary ==
=== Candidates ===
- William R. Brooks, salt company manager
- William E. Johnson, former Lieutenant Governor
- Val Peterson, administrative assistant and secretary to Governor Dwight Griswold
- Andrew E. Swanson, retired farmer and stockman
- George J. Thomas, candy distributor
- Arthur B. Walker, physician and candidate for lieutenant governor in 1938
- Arthur J. Weaver Jr., Lincoln city councilman and son of former Governor Arthur J. Weaver
- Joseph Wishart, attorney and farmer

=== Results ===
Republican primary results
Party	Candidate	Votes	%
Republican	Val Peterson	60,708	46.11
Republican	Arthur J. Weaver Jr.	39,911	30.31
Republican	Joseph Wishart	16,062	12.20
Republican	William E. Johnson	4,338	3.30
Republican	Andrew E. Swanson	4,129	3.14
Republican	George J. Thomas	2,983	2.27
Republican	William R. Brooks	2,312	1.76
Republican	Arthur B. Walker	1,214	0.92

== General election ==
=== Results ===
Nebraska gubernatorial election, 1946
Party	Candidate	Votes	%
Republican	Val Peterson	249,468	65.51%
Democratic	Frank Sorrell	131,367	34.49%
Total votes		380,835	100.0%
Republican hold			

==== By County ====
By county

County	Person Democratic		Person Republican		Various candidates Other parties		Margin		Total votes
County	#	%	#	%	#	%	#	%	Total votes
Adams County									
Antelope County									
Arthur County									
Banner County									
Blaine County									
Boone County									
Box Butte County									
Boyd County									
Brown County									
Buffalo County									
Burt County									
Butler County									
Cass County									
Cedar County									
Chase County									
Cherry County									
Cheyenne County									
Clay County									
Colfax County									
Cuming County									
Custer County									
Dakota County									
Dawes County									
Dawson County									
Deuel County									
Dixon County									
Dodge County									
Douglas County									
Dundy County									
Fillmore County									
Franklin County									
Frontier County									
Furnas County									
Gage County									
Garden County									
Garfield County									
Gosper County									
Grant County									
Greeley County									
Hall County									
Hamilton County									
Hayes County									
Hitchcock County									
Holt County									
Hooker County									
Howard County									
Jefferson County									
Johnson County									
Kearney County									
Keith County									
Keya Paha County									
Kimball County									
Knox County									
Lancaster County									
Lincoln County									
Logan County									
Loup County									
Madison County									
McPherson County									
Merrick County									
Morrill County									
Nance County									
Nance County									
Nemaha County									
Nuckolls County									
Otoe County									
Pawnee County									
Perkins County									
Phelps County									
Pierce County									
Platte County									
Polk County									
Red Willow County									
Richardson County									
Rock County									
Saline County									
Sarpy County									
Saunders County									
Scotts Bluff County									
Seward County									
Sheridan County									
Sioux County									
Stanton County									
Thayer County									
Stanton County									
Thurston County									
Valley County									
Washington County									
Wayne County									
Webster County									
Wheeler County									
York County									
Totals									

== See also ==
- 1946 Nebraska lieutenant gubernatorial election
