= Senator Wylie =

Senator Wylie may refer to:

- Fannie Wylie (1894–1971), Nebraska State Senate
- George Wylie (politician) (1848–1926), Wisconsin State Senate
- J. B. Wylie (1855–1932), Arizona State Senate
- Matt Wylie (1889/90–1964), Nebraska State Senate
- William M. Wylie (1928–2006), Nebraska State Senate
