= Sam Arora =

American politician (born 1981)

- ਸੈਮ ਅਰੋੜਾ
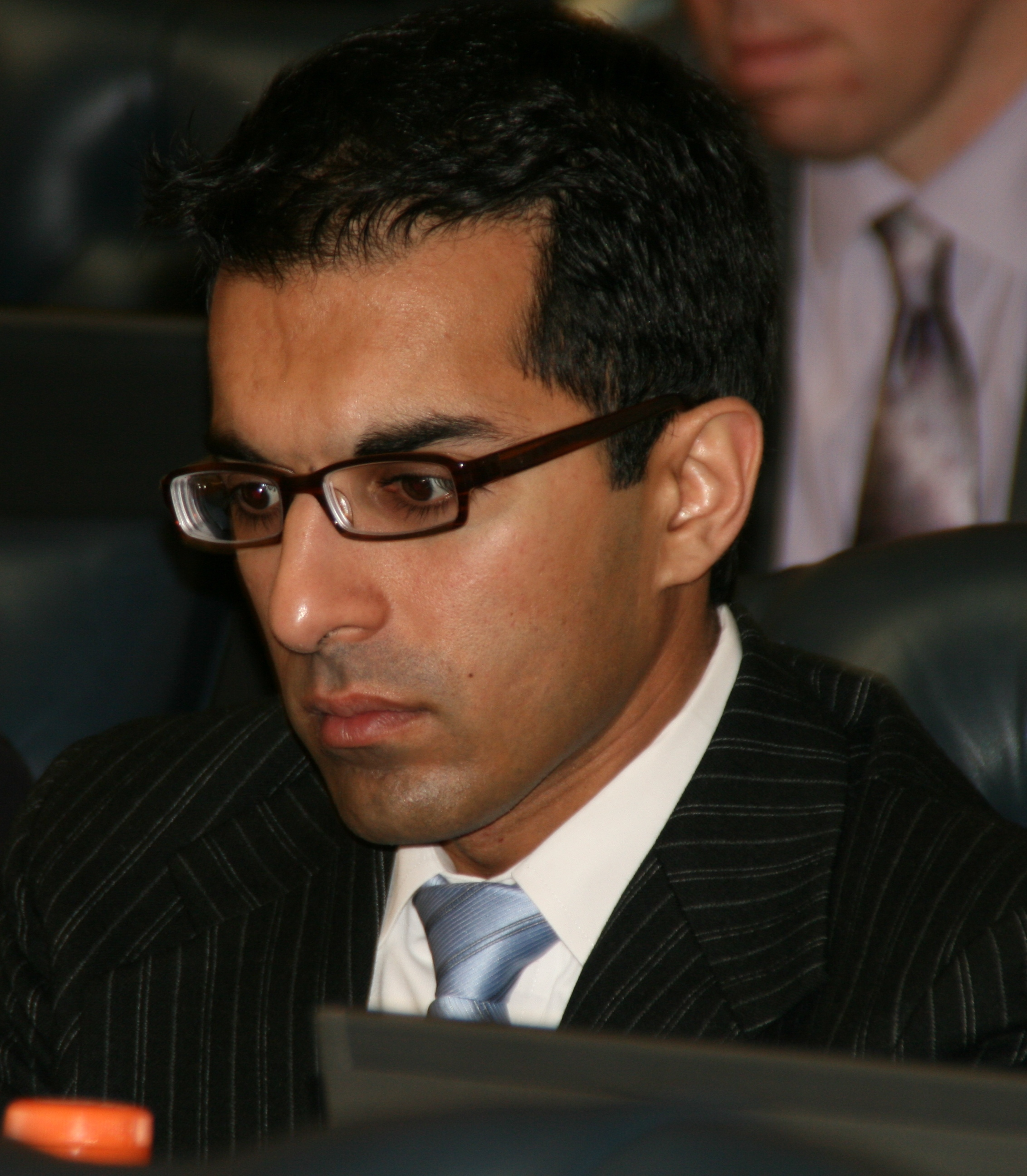

Member of the Maryland House of Delegates from the 19th district
- In office January 12, 2011 – January 13, 2015
- Preceded by: Henry B. Heller
- Succeeded by: Maricé Morales

Personal details
- Born: January 9, 1981 (age 45) New York City, U.S.
- Party: Democratic
- Occupation: Community advocate and businessman
- Website: samarora.com

Sam Arora (Punjabi: ਸੈਮ ਅਰੋੜਾ; born January 9, 1981) is an American businessman and politician from Montgomery County, Maryland. A Democrat, Arora was elected to the Maryland House of Delegates in 2010, representing the state's 19th district. He was sworn into office on January 12, 2011. He announced in 2013 that he would not seek reelection to a second term.

== Early life and career ==
Arora's parents are Punjabis who immigrated from New Delhi, India to the United States in the 1970s, settling in Montgomery County, Maryland. They moved to New York City for several years, where Arora was born, and they returned to Maryland in 1982. He attended the Barrie School, where he was student body president and graduated salutatorian. He earned a bachelor's degree cum laude from Columbia College, where he was a founder of the Columbia Political Union, and a J.D. degree from Georgetown University Law Center, where he was president of the student bar association.

Arora currently is Vice President for Business Development of the Arora Group, a health care services firm that primarily serves the Department of Defense and U.S. Coast Guard.

== Political career ==
Arora began working in 1999 as an intern and briefly as a staff assistant to U.S. Senator Carl Levin (D-MI) before moving to New York to attend Columbia University, where he began interning on the exploratory campaign for then-First Lady Hillary Clinton and later in her Senate office. He served as an aide to Democratic National Committee chair Terry McAuliffe during the 2003-2004 election cycle before returning to work for Sen. Clinton's campaign committee for Clinton's 2006 re-election campaign and part of her 2008 presidential primary campaign. Arora also served as a legal clerk to Maryland Attorney General Douglas F. Gansler and in the criminal appellate division of the U.S. Attorney's Office.

=== Same-sex marriage ===
Arora ran for the Maryland House of Delegates on a platform of support for same-sex marriage in Maryland and co-sponsored a bill allowing it early in the 2011 session. A similar bill was filed in the Maryland Senate (SB 116-Civil Marriage Protection Act) and was assigned to the House Judiciary committee, the committee on which Arora serves.

In early March 2011, Arora began backpedaling on his support for the legislation, removing references to his earlier enthusiasm for same-sex marriage from his campaign's Twitter account and privately telling the bill's sponsor, Del. Kumar Barve, that he would vote against it once it reached the House floor. This abrupt reversal angered many of Arora's supporters in progressive and gay rights circles, prompting several to express disappointment and requests to refund their campaign donations.

After several days, Arora again changed his position, announcing on his website that he would formally support the measure so voters could decide the issue in a referendum. During the House Judiciary committee voting session on SB 116, Arora did not participate in the vote for the bill. SB 116 was approved by the committee 12-10 and was to be forwarded to the full House of Delegates for final approval.

Arora voted against civil marriage rights for same-sex couples when the full House of Delegates voted in the following year on February 17, 2012. The legislation passed, 72–67. Arora had reportedly been lobbied that same day by Maryland Governor Martin O'Malley, Associate Director in the White House Office of Public Engagement, Kal Penn, former President Bill Clinton (whose wife, Hillary, Arora used to work for), and longtime Democratic party leader and advisor Terry McAuliffe who all supported the law. Arora has not given any explanation for why he reversed his position from co-sponsoring a marriage equality bill to opposing it.

== 2010 primary election ==
Arora ran for a delegate seat in the three-member 19th district, where he grew up. The district includes the Montgomery County communities of Silver Spring, Wheaton, Leisure World, Northwood, Four Corners, Aspen Hill, Kemp Mill, Olney, Derwood, Laytonsville and unincorporated areas of Rockville and Gaithersburg. Incumbents Roger Manno and Henry B. Heller had decided against seeking reelection, creating two open seats in the 19th.

Six Democrats filed for delegate and, in the Democratic primary election held on September 14, Arora won a place on the Democratic ticket for the general election along with incumbent Benjamin F. Kramer and Bonnie Cullison.

Name	Votes	Percent	Outcome
Ben Kramer	7,603	26.3%	Won
Bonnie Cullison	6,083	21.1%	Won
Sam Arora	5,767	20.0%	Won
Jay Hutchins	4,559	15.8%	Lost
Hoan Dang	3,277	11.3%	Lost
Vivian Scretchen	1,600	5.5%	Lost

== 2010 general election ==
In the general election, the three Democratic nominees faced two Republican candidates, and the Democratic team won in a landslide with Arora placing second.

Name	Votes	Percent	Outcome
Ben Kramer, Democrat	23,526	25.8%	Won
Sam Arora, Democrat	22,242	24.4%	Won
Bonnie Cullison, Democrat	21,795	23.9%	Won
Linn Rivera, Republican	11,929	13.1%	Lost
Tom Masser, Republican	11,362	12.5%	Lost

== Personal ==
In 2006, Arora was named one of the "50 Most Beautiful People" on Capitol Hill by The Hill newspaper, which wrote that he "bears an uncanny resemblance to actor Ben Stiller."

The 2010 election of Arora and Aruna Miller along with the re-election of Majority Leader Kumar P. Barve made Maryland the first state in the United States to elect more than one Indian American to a state legislature.
