= Bonnie Cullison =

American politician (born 1954)

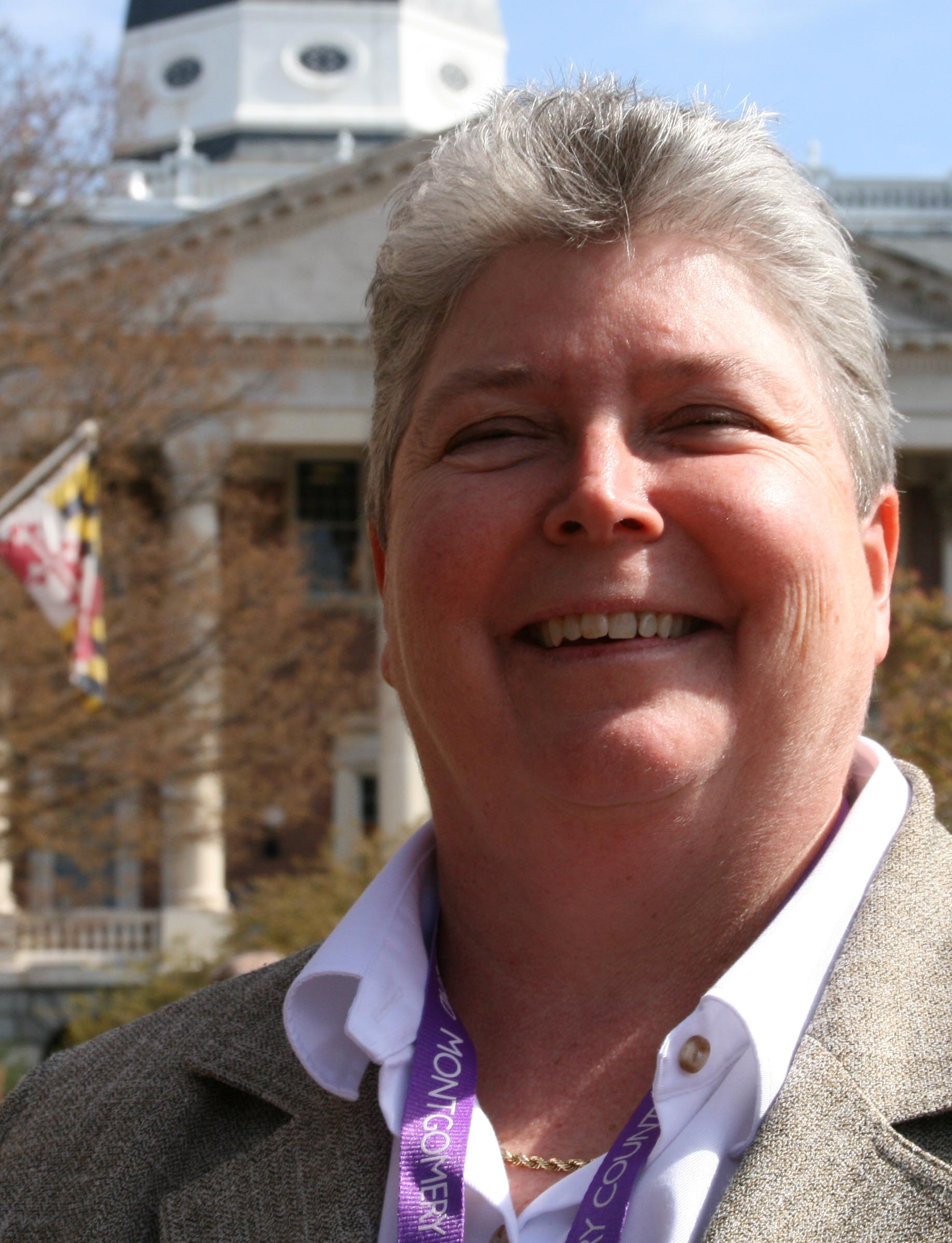

Member of the Maryland House of Delegates from the 19th district
- Incumbent
- Assumed office January 12, 2011 Serving with Vaughn Stewart, Charlotte Crutchfield
- Preceded by: Henry B. Heller

Personal details
- Born: Bonita Lynne Cullison; March 24, 1954 (age 72) Baltimore, Maryland, U.S.
- Party: Democratic
- Spouse: Marcia Massey (m. 2013)
- Education: University of Maryland, College Park (BA, MA)
- Website: Official website
- Cullison's voice Cullison on school-based health centers in Maryland. Recorded October 9, 2026

Bonita Lynne Cullison (born March 24, 1954) is an American teacher, labor official, and politician who has served as a member of the Maryland House of Delegates in District 19 since 2011.

== Background ==
Cullison was born in Baltimore on March 24, 1954. She graduated from the University of Maryland, College Park, where she earned her bachelor's and master's degrees in speech pathology in 1976 and 1978.

After graduating, Cullison worked as a speech language pathologist for St. Mary's County Public Schools from 1978 to 1981, afterwards working as a special education teacher for Montgomery County Public Schools until 2000. She continued to work in various local education organizations and has worked as a field liaison for the National Education Association since 2010.

From 2003 to 2009, Cullison was the chief of the Montgomery County teachers' union. While seeking to be elected to the policy-setting executive committee of the National Education Association, Cullison raised money to pay for her campaign's travel, mailings, and other costs. She asked for contributions from Maryland state legislators, many of whom had previously been endorsed by the teachers' union. The Attorney General of Maryland determined that political campaigns cannot fund a national union's internal election, and the Maryland State Board of Elections ordered Cullison to refund the several thousand dollars she'd raised from state legislators, and she did so. Cullison was not elected to the position at the National Education Association.

Cullison served as the chair of the Committee for Montgomery, a coalition of business and community leaders in Montgomery County advocating for Montgomery County's interests in the Maryland General Assembly, from 2006 to 2007.

== In the legislature ==
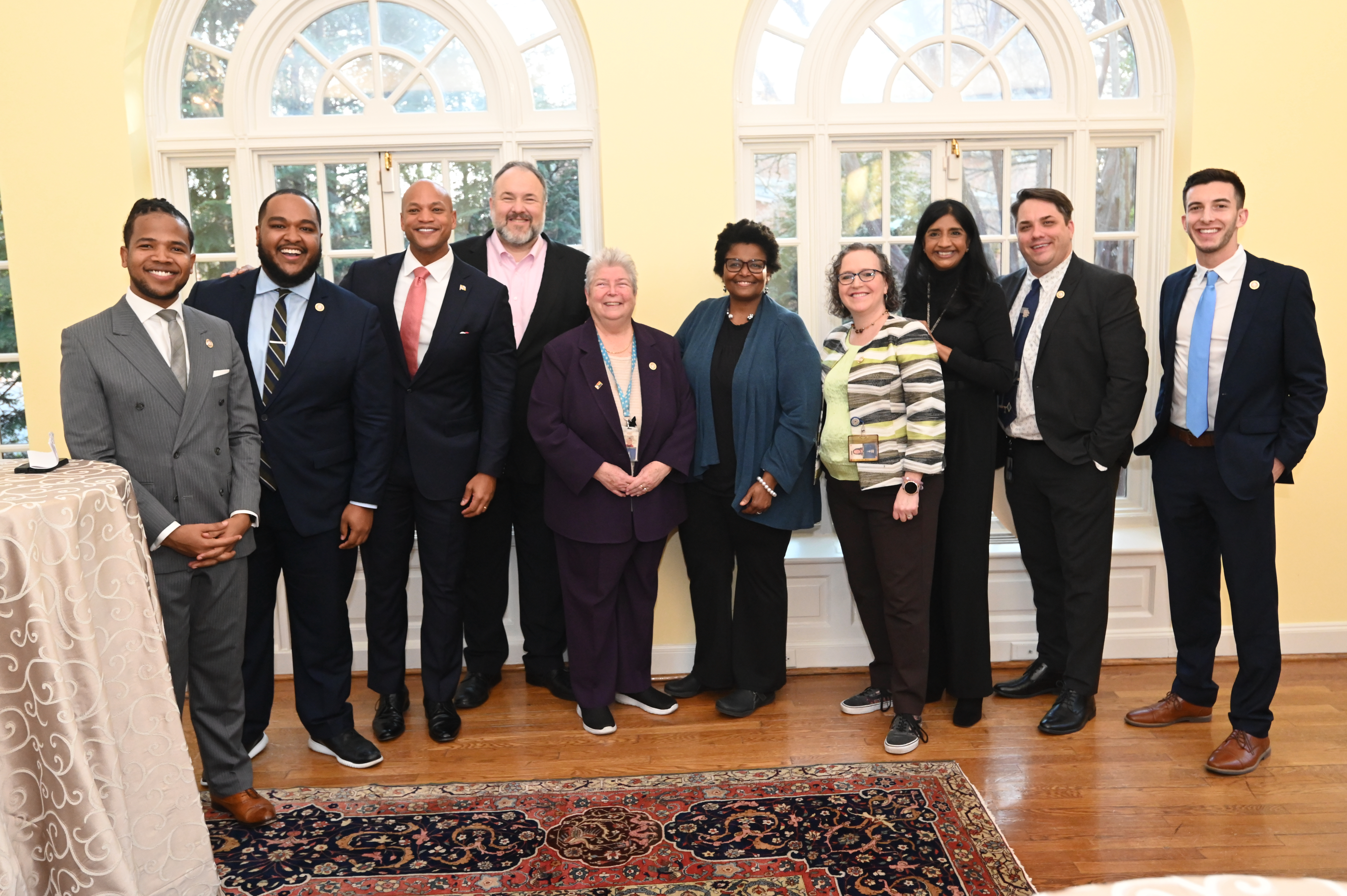
Cullison (center) and other members of the LGBTQ+ Caucus with Governor Wes Moore, 2023

Cullison was sworn into the Maryland House of Delegates on January 12, 2011. She served as a member of the Health and Government Operations Committee (later renamed to the Health Committee) during her entire tenure and served as the committee's vice chair from 2023 to 2027. She was a member of the Rules and Executive Nominations Committee from 2023 to 2027. Cullison served as deputy majority whip from 2013 to 2018, and as deputy speaker pro tempore from 2020 to 2023.

In August 2017, after state senator Roger Manno announced that he would run for Congress in Maryland's 6th congressional district in 2018, Cullison expressed interest in running for Manno's seat in the Maryland Senate. She ultimately decided against running, instead running for re-election and backing Benjamin F. Kramer in the Senate election.

On January 28, 2026, Cullison announced that she would not run for re-election in 2026, saying that she wanted to maximize her time with her wife. In August 2026, she was appointed as the chair of the Maryland Prescription Drug Affordability Board, succeeding Van Mitchell.

== Political positions ==
=== Education ===
In 2013, Cullison voted against a bill that would give Prince George's County Executive Rushern Baker more control over the county's school system, including the ability to appoint its superintendent.

In August 2019, Cullison signed onto a letter calling for the Maryland State Department of Education to add lessons on LGBT and disability rights movements into social studies curriculum. The Department of Education agreed to update its curriculum to include this material two weeks after it was sent.

=== Gun policy ===
In April 2013, Cullison voted for the Firearm Safety Act of 2013, a bill that placed restrictions on firearm purchases and magazine capacity in semi-automatic rifles.

=== Health care ===
During the 2018 legislative session, Cullison supported a bill to ask the federal government to divert money to Maryland used to offset the cost of high-risk patients on the Affordable Care Act's insurance pool, instead using it under a new "reinsurance program" under the Maryland Health Benefit Exchange.

In 2019, Cullison defended a bill on the House floor to establish the Prescription Drug Affordability Board to negotiate the prices of prescription drugs for state and local governments, which passed and became law. In 2025, she introduced a bill that would allow the Prescription Drug Affordability Board to set statewide upper payment limits on certain drugs.

During the 2023 legislative session, Cullison introduced the Access to Care Act, which would allow undocumented immigrants to buy into the state's health exchange.

=== Immigration ===
In 2017, Cullison supported the Maryland Trust Act, which would prevent the use of state and local funding for federal immigration enforcement.

=== Israel ===
In May 2018, Cullison said she supported Governor Larry Hogan's executive order banning the state from contracting with companies that supported the Boycott, Divestment and Sanctions movement.

=== Minimum wage ===
During the 2014 legislative session, Cullison voted for a bill to raise the state's minimum wage to $10.10 an hour by 2017.

=== Social issues ===
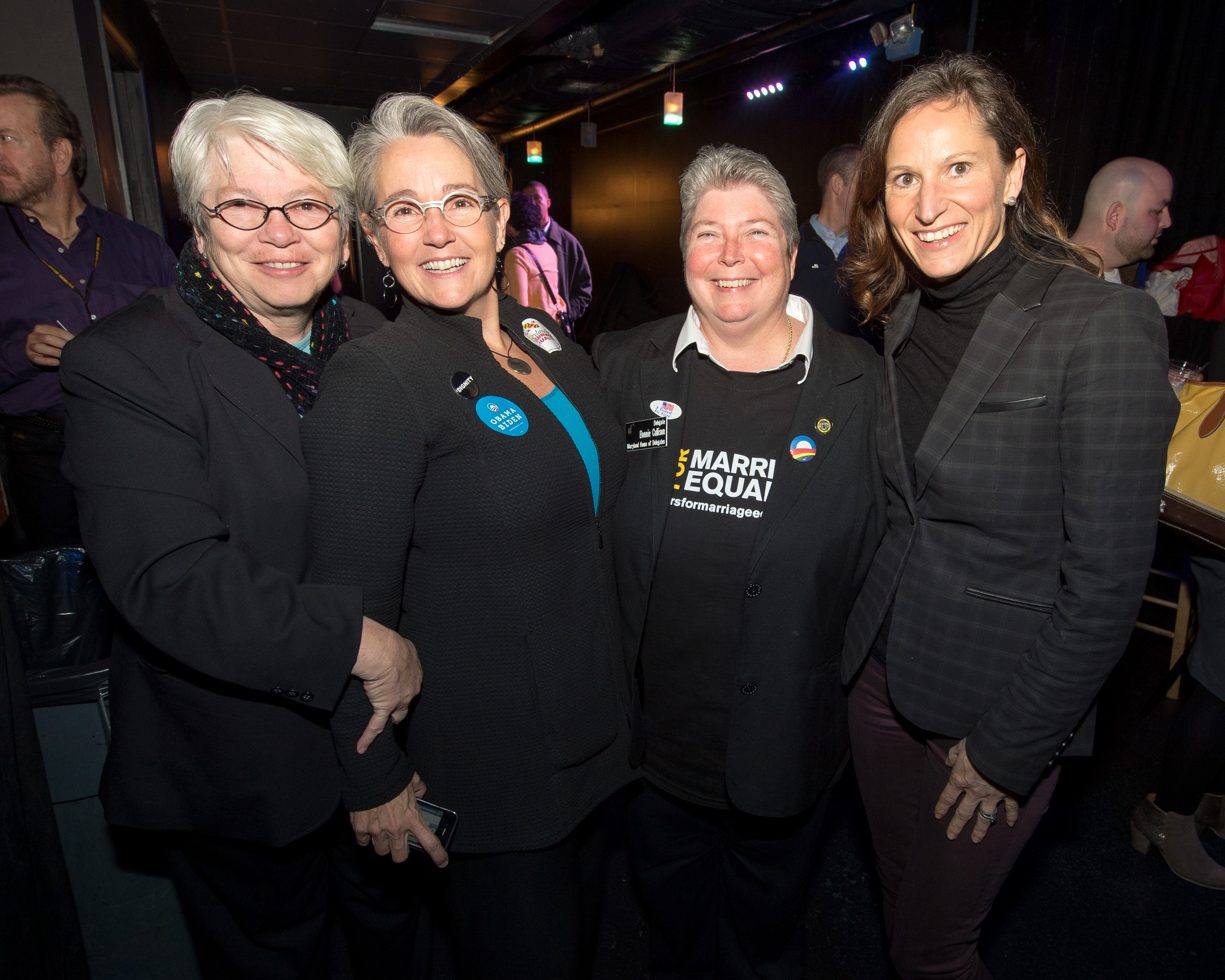
Cullison (center) at the Question 6 victory party, 2012

Cullison supported the Civil Marriage Protection Act, a bill to legalize same-sex marriage in Maryland. During the 2011 and 2014 legislative sessions, she supported a bill to ban discrimination against transgender individuals. In 2018, she introduced a bill to ban conversion therapy for minors, which passed and was signed into law by Governor Larry Hogan. During the 2023 legislative session, Cullison supported the Trans Health Equity Act, a bill that would have required the state's Medicaid program to cover gender-affirming treatment, which passed and was signed into law by Governor Wes Moore.

In September 2018, Cullison signed a letter calling for a county investigation into sexual assault allegations made against U.S. Supreme Court nominee Brett Kavanaugh. Montgomery County law enforcement officials declined to investigate the matter unless the alleged victim filed a complaint.

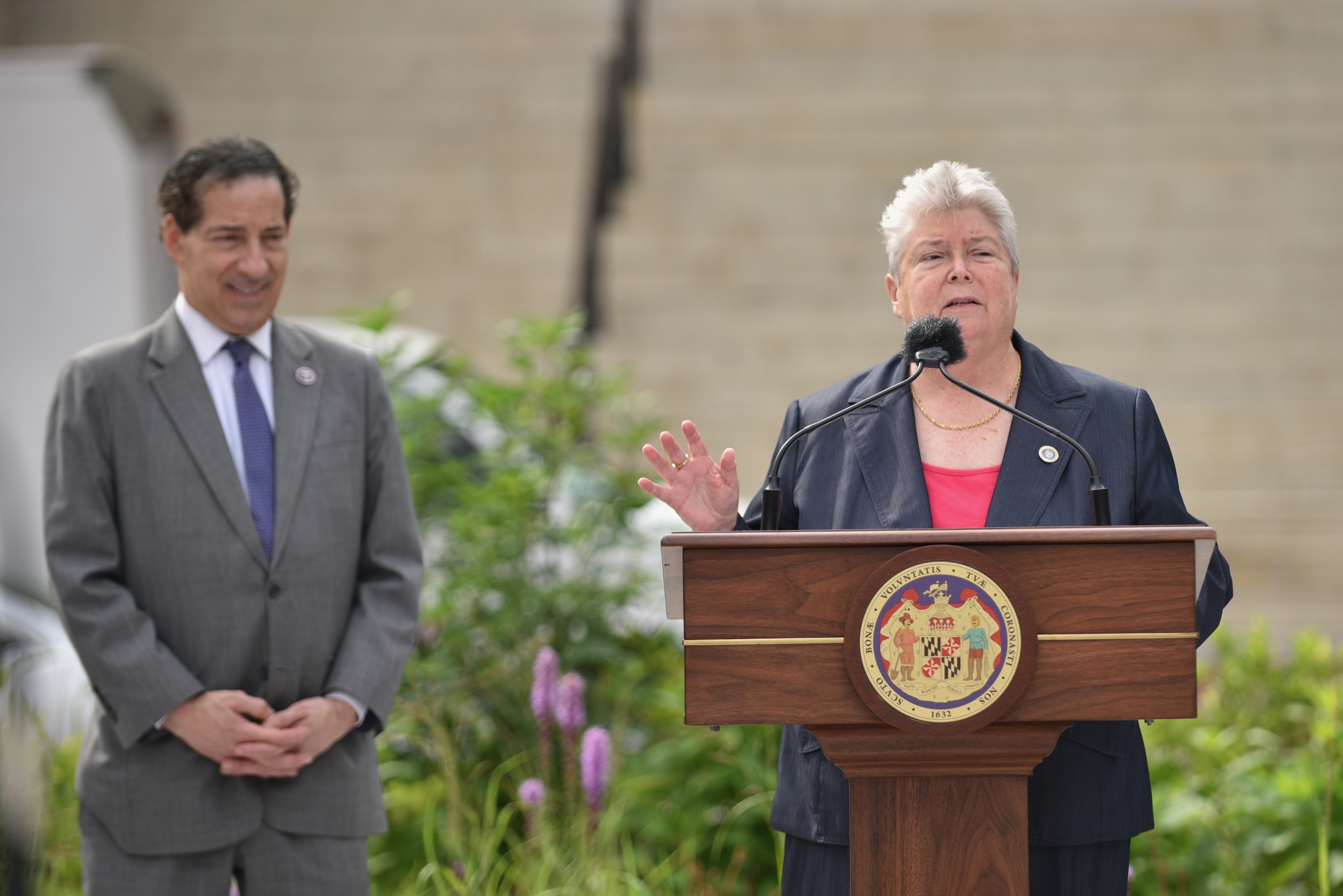
Cullison and Jamie Raskin at the signing of the Tommy Bloom Raskin Act

During the 2021 legislative session and following the suicide of Jamie Raskin's son, Tommy, Cullison introduced a bill named for Tommy that would allow people to opt into periodic calls from 2-1-1 crisis counselors. The bill passed and was signed into law by Governor Hogan.

=== Taxes ===
During the 2013 legislative session, Cullison voted for a bill to index the state's gas tax to inflation to pay for transportation projects.

== Personal life ==
Cullison is openly lesbian. She is married to her wife, Marcia Massey, who was her partner of 29 years up until Maryland legalized same-sex marriage in 2013. Together, they live in Aspen Hill, Maryland.

== Electoral history ==
Maryland House of Delegates District 19 Democratic primary election, 2010
Party	Candidate	Votes	%
Democratic	Benjamin F. Kramer (incumbent)	7,603	26.3
Democratic	Bonnie Cullison	6,083	21.1
Democratic	Sam Arora	5,767	20.0
Democratic	Jay Hutchins	4,559	15.8
Democratic	Hoan Dang	3,277	11.3
Democratic	Vivian Scretchen	1,600	5.5

Maryland House of Delegates District 19 election, 2010
Party	Candidate	Votes	%
Democratic	Benjamin F. Kramer (incumbent)	23,526	25.8
Democratic	Sam Arora	22,242	24.4
Democratic	Bonnie Cullison	21,795	23.9
Republican	Linn Rivera	11,929	13.1
Republican	Tom Masser	11,362	12.5
Write-in		288	0.3

Maryland House of Delegates District 19 election, 2014
Party	Candidate	Votes	%
Democratic	Benjamin F. Kramer (incumbent)	22,238	29.0
Democratic	Bonnie Cullison (incumbent)	21,394	27.9
Democratic	Maricé Morales	20,104	26.2
Republican	Martha Schaerr	12,622	16.5
Write-in		336	0.4

Maryland House of Delegates District 19 election, 2018
Party	Candidate	Votes	%
Democratic	Charlotte Crutchfield	34,507	25.7
Democratic	Bonnie Cullison (incumbent)	33,690	25.1
Democratic	Vaughn Stewart	32,636	24.3
Republican	Dave Pasti	12,234	9.1
Republican	Martha Schaerr	10,651	7.9
Republican	Helen Domenici	10,460	7.8
Write-in		132	0.1

Maryland House of Delegates District 19 election, 2022
Party	Candidate	Votes	%
Democratic	Charlotte Crutchfield (incumbent)	28,083	30.1
Democratic	Bonnie Cullison (incumbent)	27,747	29.7
Democratic	Vaughn Stewart (incumbent)	27,033	29.0
Republican	Frank Nice	10,035	10.8
Write-in		392	0.4
