= Senator Cramer (disambiguation) =

Kevin Cramer (born 1961) is a U.S. Senator from North Dakota since 2019. Senator Cramer may also refer to:

- Glenn Cramer (1884–1966), Nebraska State Senate
- John Cramer (representative) (1779–1870), New York State Senate
- Kenneth F. Cramer (1894–1954), Connecticut State Senate

== See also ==
- Gary DeCramer (1944–2012), Minnesota State Senate
- John Cramer Voorhees (1865–1918), Iowa State Senate
- Senator Kramer (disambiguation)
