= Senator Kramer =

Senator Kramer may refer to:

- Benjamin F. Kramer (born 1957), Maryland State Senate
- Don Kramer (politician) (born 1940), Minnesota State Senate
- Mary Kramer (born 1935), Iowa State Senate
- Rona E. Kramer (born 1954), Maryland State Senate
- Sidney Kramer (born 1925), Maryland State Senate

== See also ==
- Senator Cramer (disambiguation)
