= John G. Donner =

American politician (1915–1967)

Member of the Nebraska Legislature from the 27th district
- In office January 1, 1957 – January 3, 1961
- Preceded by: Glenn Cramer
- Succeeded by: Matt Wylie

Personal details
- Born: May 6, 1915 Innisfail, Alberta, Canada
- Died: December 13, 1967 (aged 52) Elgin, Nebraska
- Party: Republican
- Spouse: Lois B. Lorenzen
- Children: 3
- Relatives: Matt Wylie (uncle); William M. Wylie (cousin)
- Education: Missouri Auction School
- Occupation: Auctioneer

John G. Donner (May 6, 1915 – December 13, 1967) was a Republican politician from Nebraska who served as a member of the Nebraska Legislature from the 27th district from 1957 to 1961.

== Early life ==
Donner was born in 1915 in Innisfail, Alberta, in Canada, and moved to Nebraska, where he grew up in Elgin. He graduated from Elgin High School and later attended the Missouri Auction School in Kansas City, Missouri. Donner worked as an auctioneer and a farmer, and served as city councilman and mayor in Elgin.

== 1952 gubernatorial campaign ==
In 1952, Donner ran for governor in the Republican primary. He received only 2 percent of the vote, losing to Lincoln Mayor Victor Anderson.

== Nebraska Legislature ==
Donner ran for the Nebraska Legislature in 1956, challenging incumbent State Senator Glenn Cramer for re-election in the 27th district, which included Antelope and Boone counties. In the nonpartisan primary, Cramer placed first, receiving 39 percent of the vote to Donner's 33 percent, and they proceeded to the general election. Donner ultimately defeated Cramer in a landslide, winning 62 percent of the vote.

In 1958, Donner ran for re-election, and was challenged by Herman Estrem, an Albion farmer and banker. Donner narrowly placed first in the primary, winning 46 more votes than Estrem. In the general election, Donner won re-election with 56 percent of the vote.

During the 1959 legislative session, following the failure of several bills that he had sponsored, Donner wrote out a letter of resignation and sent it to Governor Ralph Brooks. Following his purported resignation, the Nebraska Attorney General's office stated that, to be effective, the letter needed to be directed to Lieutenant Governor Dwight Burney, the presiding officer of the legislature, not Brooks. State Senator John P. Munnelly moved to give a vote of confidence in Donner, which was approved by a 34–1 vote, with Donner voting against it. Donner subsequently announced that he would not resign.

== 1960 lieutenant-gubernatorial campaign ==
Donner opted to run for Lieutenant Governor in 1960 rather than seek re-election, challenging incumbent Dwight Burney in the Republican primary. He lost the primary to Burney by a wide margin, receiving 5 percent of the vote to Burney's 53 percent.

== Post-legislative career ==
In 1962, Donner initially announced that he would run for the state legislature in his previous district. His uncle, Matt Wylie, had been elected to succeed him in 1960, and planned to seek re-election, but had not announced that he would do so. Donner ultimately withdrew from the race, and Wylie ran for re-election; Donner instead ran for the Antelope County Board of Supervisors from the 7th district. He lost the Republican primary to William M. Wylie. He ran for the state Railway Commission in 1964 from the 3rd district, and lost the primary to Fred Peterson.

== Death ==
Donner died on December 13, 1967.
