= Charlotte Crutchfield =

American politician (born 1963)

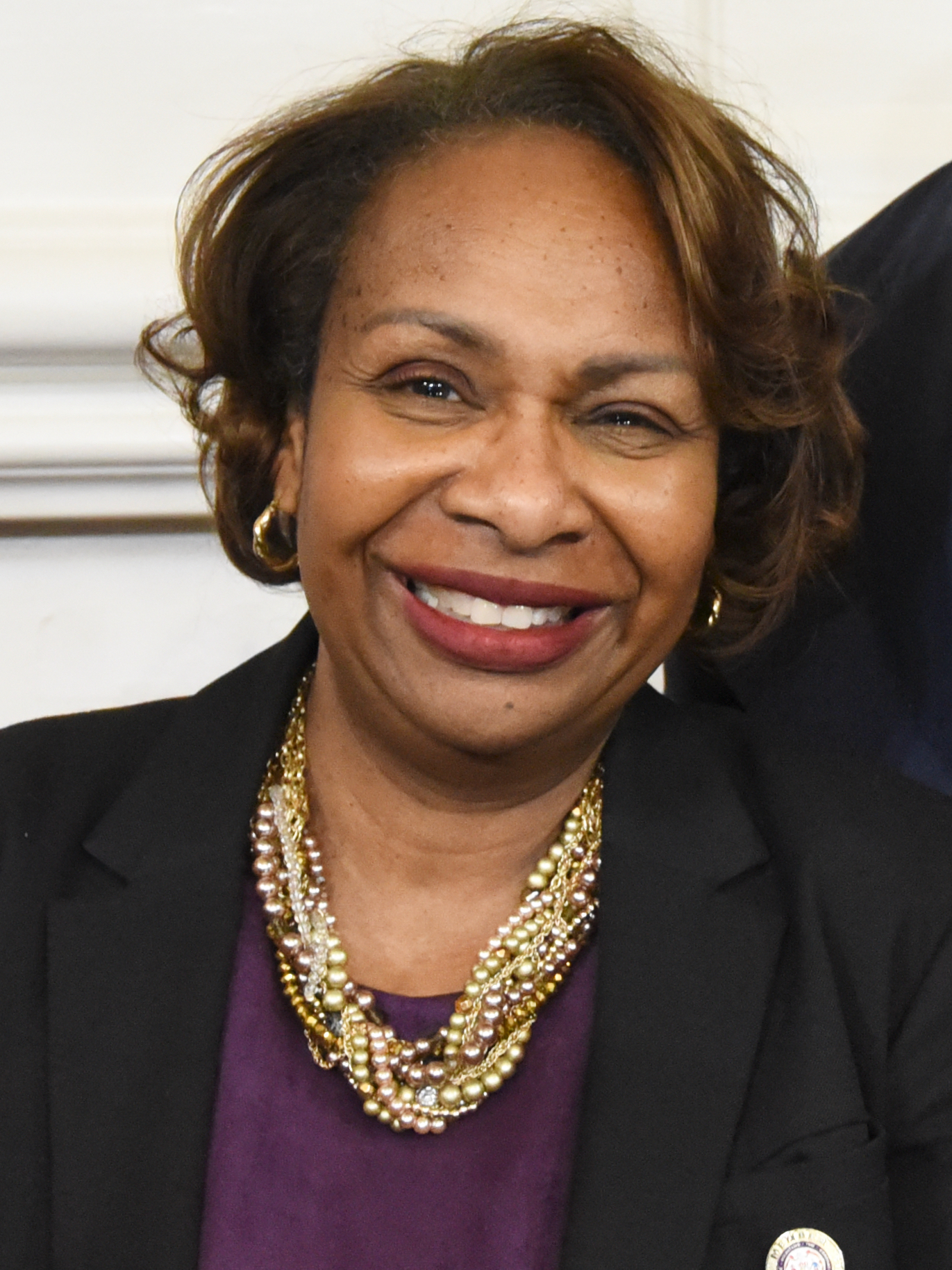
- Crutchfield in 2024

Member of the Maryland House of Delegates from the 19th district
- Incumbent
- Assumed office January 9, 2019 Serving with Bonnie Cullison and Vaughn Stewart
- Preceded by: Benjamin F. Kramer

Personal details
- Born: December 8, 1963 (age 62) Chicago, Illinois, U.S.
- Party: Democratic
- Children: 2
- Occupation: Attorney

Charlotte Crutchfield (born December 8, 1963) is an American politician from Maryland. She is a Democratic member of the Maryland House of Delegates who currently represents Maryland House of Delegates District 19 in Montgomery County.

== Early life and career ==
Crutchfield was born in Chicago, Illinois on December 8, 1963. She attended Howard University, where she earned a bachelor's degree in economics in 1986, and the Boston College School of Law, where she earned a Juris Doctor in 1989. She was an assistant state's attorney for Montgomery County from 1991 to 1992. She also served as an associate general counsel at Gulfstream Aerospace from 1996 to 2002. Crutchfield is a practicing attorney in the area of employment law.

Crutchfield first ran for the House of Delegates in 2014, coming in fourth place with 15.7 percent of the vote. She expressed a "very strong interest" in running again in 2018, eventually filing to run on January 10, 2018. She came in second place in the Democratic primary election, receiving 17.6 percent of the vote.

== In the legislature ==
Charlotte Crutchfield was sworn into the Maryland House of Delegates on January 9, 2019. She, along with Jheanelle Wilkins and Pamela Queen, became the first Black women elected to represent Montgomery County in the House of Delegates.

On May 20, 2020, Crutchfield wrote a letter to Governor Larry Hogan urging him to grant clemency to Eraina Pretty, the longest-serving female prisoner in Maryland, after she tested positive for COVID-19. Crutchfield wrote, "Though she was convicted of a violent crime, she is not a violent person. There is no reason to believe that if Ms. Pretty were released she would pose a danger to society." A Baltimore circuit judge granted the release of Pretty on December 14, 2020.

=== Committee assignments ===
- Member, Judiciary Committee, 2019–present (family law subcommittee, 2019–2020; public safety subcommittee, 2019–2020; chair, juvenile law subcommittee, 2020; member, civil law & procedure subcommittee, 2021–present; chair, family & juvenile law subcommittee, 2021–present)

=== Other memberships ===
- Secretary, Legislative Black Caucus of Maryland, 2019–present
- Member, Maryland Legislative Transit Caucus, 2019–present
- Member, Maryland Veterans Caucus, 2019–present
- Member, Women Legislators of Maryland, 2019–present
- Member, Maryland Legislative Latino Caucus, 2021–present

== Political positions ==
=== Criminal justice ===
Crutchfield introduced legislation during the 2021 legislative session that would allow individuals convicted of first-degree murder as minors to have their convictions reviewed.

During the 2019 legislative session, Crutchfield introduced legislation to create a separate, pre-release mediation unit for women in the state prison system. She introduced legislation during the 2021 legislative session that would repeal the prohibition on prosecuting sexual crimes against a victim who is the spouse of the assailant. The bill passed the House of Delegates by a vote of 125-4. The bill was re-introduced during the 2022 legislative session, during which it passed the House of Delegates by a vote of 125-6 and the Senate by 46-0.

Crutchfield introduced legislation during the 2022 legislative session that would allow hate crime victims to bring civil action against the person who committed the act. The bill passed the House of Delegates by a vote of 94-41.

=== Marijuana ===
During her 2018 campaign, Crutchfield said that she would vote to legalize recreational marijuana. During her first term, Crutchfield co-sponsored various bills to automatically expunge legal records related to marijuana possession.

== Personal life ==
Crutchfield is a military widow. She has two children and lives in Silver Spring, Maryland.

== Electoral history ==
Maryland House of Delegates District 19 Democratic Primary Election, 2014
Party	Candidate	Votes	%
Democratic	Ben Kramer	8,196	29
Democratic	Bonnie Cullison	6,279	22
Democratic	Maricé Morales	4,894	17
Democratic	Charlotte Crutchfield	4,512	16
Democratic	Paul Bardack	3,679	13
Democratic	Melodye A. Berry	1,238	4

Maryland House of Delegates District 19 Democratic Election, 2018
Party	Candidate	Votes	%
Democratic	Bonnie Cullison	7,209	21
Democratic	Charlotte Cruchfield	6,166	18
Democratic	Vaughn M. Stewart	5,939	17
Democratic	Maricé Morales	5,492	16
Democratic	Marlin Jenkins	4,531	13
Democratic	Brian Crider	3,037	9
Democratic	Carl Ward	1,830	5
Democratic	Jade Wiles, Jr.	855	2

Maryland House of Delegates District 19 General Election, 2018
Party	Candidate	Votes	%
Democratic	Charlotte Crutchfield	34,507	26
Democratic	Bonnie L. Cullison	33,690	25
Democratic	Vaughn M. Stewart	32,636	24
Republican	Helen Domenici	10,460	8
Republican	David Pasti	12,234	9
Republican	Martha Schaerr	10,651	8
