= Maryland Legislative District 19 =

American legislative district

Coordinates: 39°5′N 77°5′W

Maryland's legislative district 19
- Represents part of Montgomery County
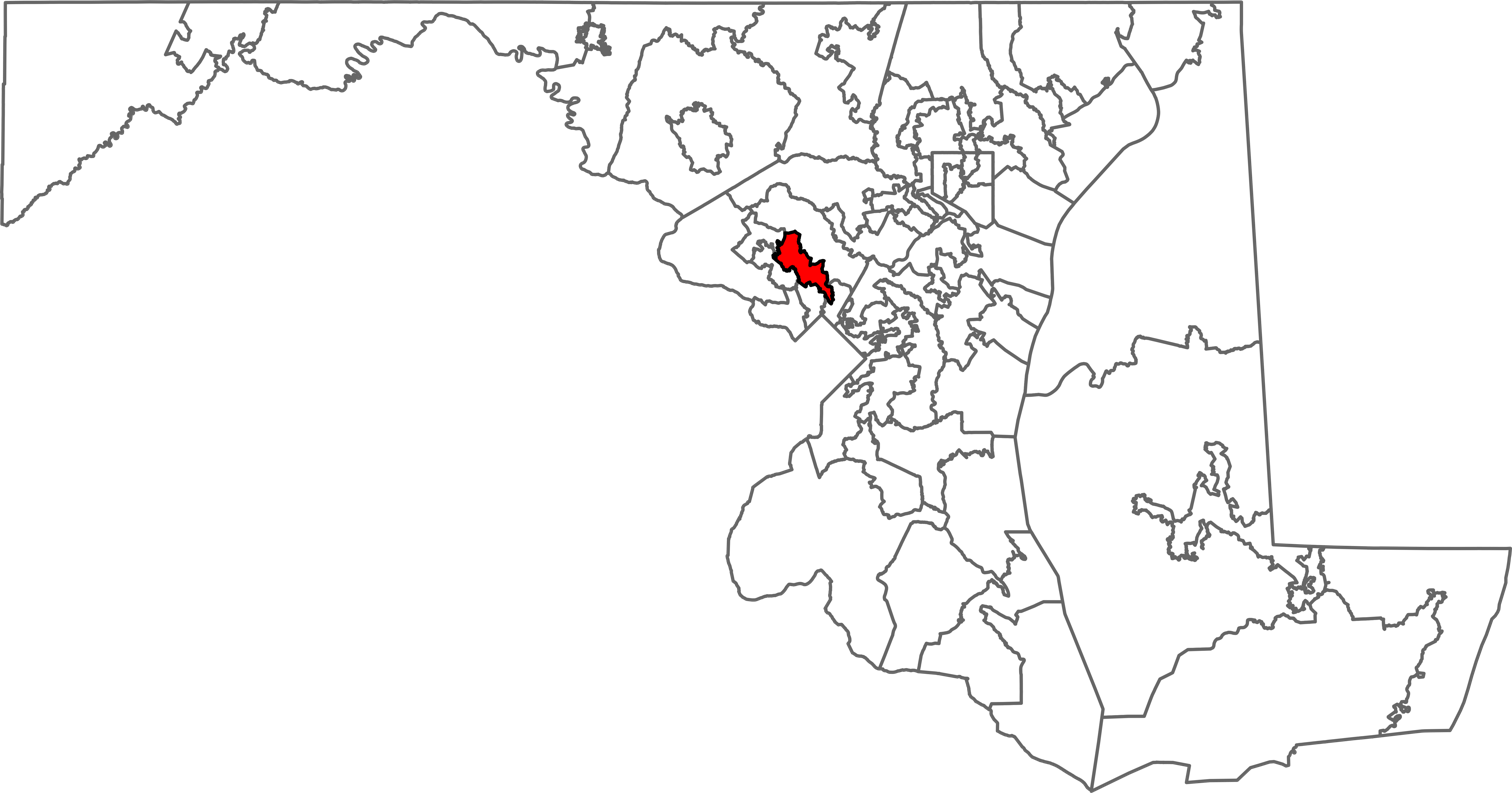
- Senator: Benjamin F. Kramer (D)
- Delegate(s): Bonnie Cullison (D); Vaughn Stewart (D); Charlotte Crutchfield (D)
- Registration: 60.4% Democratic; 17.0% Republican; 21.2% unaffiliated
- Demographics: 38.9% White; 18.9% Black/African American; 0.8% Native American; 13.2% Asian; 0% Hawaiian/Pacific Islander; 15.4% Other race; 12.8% Two or more races; 26.6% Hispanic
- Population (2020): 130,865
- Voting-age population: 101,851
- Registered voters: 82,913

Maryland Legislative District 19 is one of 47 districts in the state for the Maryland General Assembly. The district consists of several Montgomery County communities, including portions of Laytonsville, Redland, Derwood, Shady Grove, Olney, Norbeck, Norwood, Leisure World, Aspen Hill, Layhill, Glenmont, Wheaton, Kemp Mill, and Four Corners. The district is represented by three delegates in the Maryland House of Delegates.

== Demographic characteristics ==
As of the 2020 United States census, the district had a population of 130,865, of whom 101,851 (77.8%) were of voting age. The racial makeup of the district was 50,940 (38.9%) White, 24,741 (18.9%) African American, 1,005 (0.8%) Native American, 17,246 (13.2%) Asian, 37 (0.0%) Pacific Islander, 20,162 (15.4%) from some other race, and 16,719 (12.8%) from two or more races. Hispanic or Latino of any race were 34,762 (26.6%) of the population.

The district had 82,913 registered voters as of October 17, 2020, of whom 17,581 (21.2%) were registered as unaffiliated, 14,123 (17.0%) were registered as Republicans, 50,079 (60.4%) were registered as Democrats, and 711 (0.9%) were registered to other parties.

== Political representation ==
The district is represented for the 2023–2027 legislative term in the State Senate by Benjamin F. Kramer (D) and in the House of Delegates by Bonnie Cullison (D), Vaughn Stewart (D), and Charlotte Crutchfield (D). On January 28, 2026, Cullison announced that she would not seek re-election in 2026.

== Election history ==
Years	Senator	Party	Electoral history
January 8, 1975 – January 10, 1979	C. Lawrence Wiser	Democratic	Elected in 1974. Lost renomination.
January 10, 1979 – January 17, 1987	Sidney Kramer	Democratic	Elected in 1978. Re-elected in 1982. Retired to run for Montgomery County Executive.
January 17, 1987 – January 11, 1995	Idamae Garrott	Democratic	Elected in 1986. Re-elected in 1990. Retired.
January 11, 1995 – January 10, 2007	Leonard H. Teitelbaum	Democratic	Elected in 1994. Re-elected in 1998. Re-elected in 2002. Retired.
January 10, 2007 – January 12, 2011	Michael G. Lenett	Democratic	Elected in 2006. Lost renomination.
January 12, 2011 – January 9, 2019	Roger Manno	Democratic	Elected in 2010. Re-elected in 2014. Retired to run for Congress.
January 9, 2019 – present	Benjamin F. Kramer	Democratic	Elected in 2018. Re-elected in 2022. Re-elected in 2026.
