= Glenn Cramer =

American politician (1884–1966)

Member of the Nebraska Legislature from the 27th district
- In office January 7, 1947 – January 4, 1955
- Preceded by: Nell Krause
- Succeeded by: John G. Donner

Personal details
- Born: July 1, 1884 Albion, Nebraska
- Died: July 5, 1966 (aged 82) Albion, Nebraska
- Party: Republican
- Spouse(s): Ruth May Moore (m. 1909; died 1954) Alice Crellin (m. 1956)
- Education: University of Nebraska College of Agriculture
- Occupation: Newspaper publisher

Glenn Cramer (July 1, 1884 – July 5, 1966) was a Republican politician from Nebraska who served as a member of the Nebraska Legislature from the 27th district from 1947 to 1955.

== Early life ==
Cramer was born in Albion, Nebraska, in 1884, and graduated from Albion High School. He attended the University of Nebraska College of Agriculture, and in 1919 purchased the Albion News and published it until selling it in 1946.

In 1926, Cramer ran for the Nebraska House of Representatives from the 61st district. He won the Republican primary and faced John W. Porter, the Democratic nominee, in the general election. Porter defeated Cramer, winning 59 percent of the vote to Cramer's 41 percent.

Cramer was active in the Nebraska Republican Party, serving as a delegate to the state party convention in 1936, and was elected chairman of the Boone County Republican Party.

== Nebraska Legislature ==
In 1946, State Senator Edwin Schultz resigned from the legislature to serve as secretary of the state fair board, and Cramer ran to succeed him in the 27th district, which included Antelope and Boone counties. In the nonpartisan primary, Cramer faced attorney D. L. Jouvenat. Cramer placed first in the primary election, winning 68 percent of the vote to Jouvenat's 32 percent. After the primary, Governor Dwight Griswold appointed Nell Krause to serve out the remaining months of Schultz's term, but she did not contest the election. Cramer subsequently won the general election, receiving 62 percent of the vote to Jouvenat's 38 percent.

Cramer ran for re-election in 1948. He was challenged by Fritz Olmsted, a U.S. Army veteran and food company employee. Cramer placed first in the primary, winning 53 percent of the vote. He narrowly defeated Olmsted in the general election, winning his second term, 51–49 percent.

In 1950, Cramer was re-elected unopposed to a third term. He was elected without opposition to a fourth term in 1952.

Cramer sought a fifth term in 1954, and was challenged by businessman A. J. Sellery. Cramer received 55 percent of the vote in the primary, and defeated Sellery with 51 percent of the vote in the general election.

In 1956, Cramer ran for re-election to a sixth term. He was challenged by farmer Forrest Barker and Elgin Mayor John G. Donner. Cramer received 39 percent of the vote in the primary election, and advanced to the general election with Donner, who placed second with 33 percent. Donner defeated Cramer by a wide margin in the general election, winning 62 percent of the vote to Cramer's 38 percent.

== Personal life ==
Cramer married Ruth May Moore in 1909. She died in 1954, and Cramer married Alice Crellin in 1956.

== Death ==
Cramer died on July 5, 1966.
