= Pope John XXIII Central Catholic High School =

Catholic high school in Nebraska

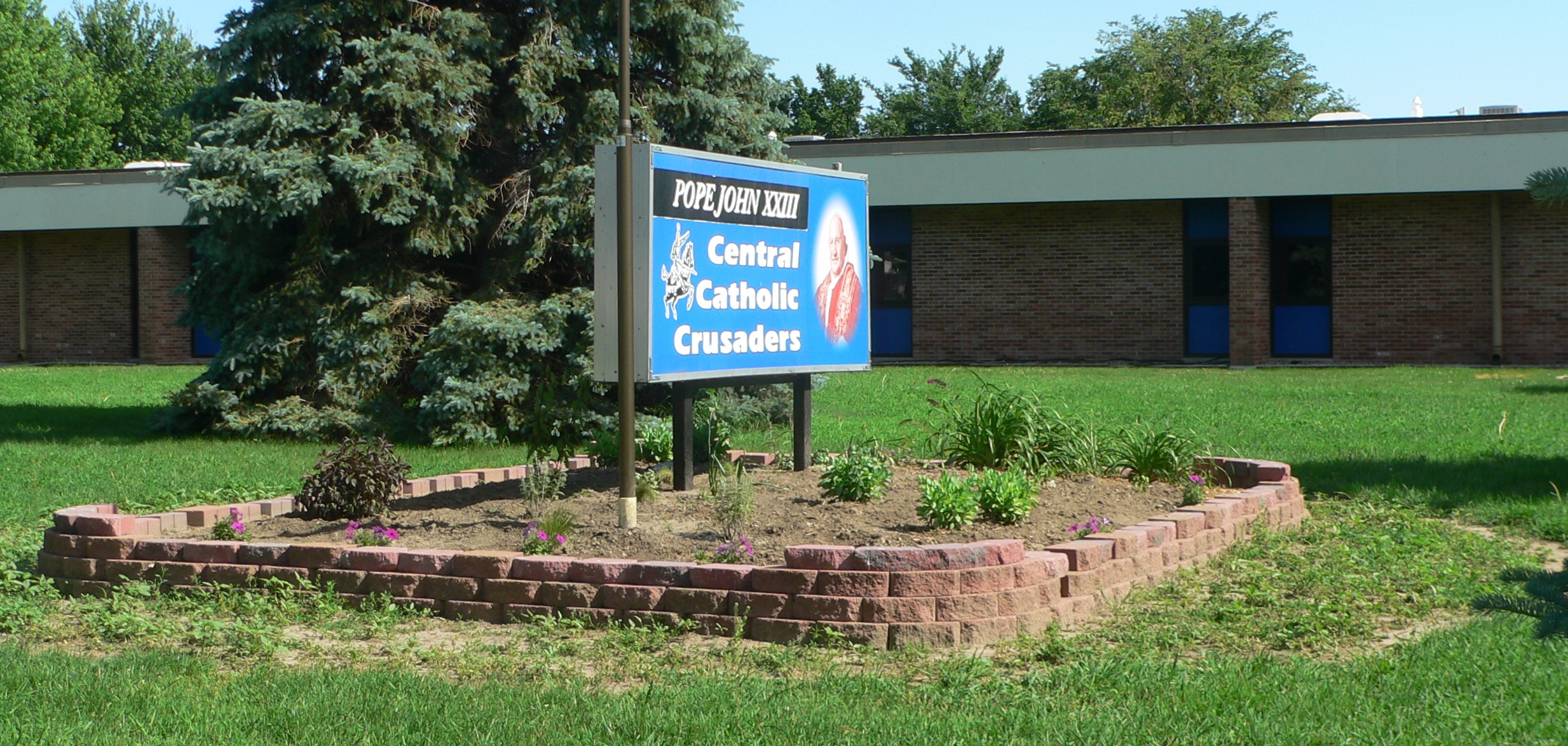

Location
- 303 Remington Street; Elgin, (Antelope County), Nebraska 68636; United States; 41°58′46″N 98°4′54″W

Information
- Type: Private, coeducational
- Religious affiliation: Catholic Church
- Established: 1967
- President: Fr. John Norman
- Principal: Lisa Schumacher
- Grades: 7–12
- Colors: Blue and white
- Team name: Crusaders
- Website: http://www.pjcrusaders.org

Pope John XXIII Central Catholic High School, located in Elgin, Nebraska, United States, is a Catholic high school established in the fall of 1967. It was named in honor of Pope John XXIII, the 261st pope of the Catholic Church. It is located in the Archdiocese of Omaha.

== History ==
On May 6, 1966, six parishes from the area came together to discuss the building of a central Catholic high school in Elgin, Nebraska to replace two existing schools in Petersburg (St. John's High School) and Elgin (St. Boniface High School). A non-profit corporation was founded in June to operate the new school. A 30,300 square feet (2,810 m^{2}), one-level loop corridor building design was chosen. The new school could accommodate up to 350 students and opened in September 1967. A dedication was held on September 24.

== Activities ==
Pope John's school colors are blue and white; its athletic teams are the Crusaders. The school takes part in the D-1 activities in the Nebraska School Activities Association.

The school's track and field team has had a few students qualify for state championships in recent years, and the girls' basketball team made it to state in 2006. In 2008, the girls' basketball team made it to the state championship game and ended up winning state runner-up. The boys' basketball team made it to state for the first time in 2007. In November 2007, the football team won the school's first state championship. The wrestling team has produced 17 state champions in Class C and Class D, and has finished in the top three in team, scoring twice (in 1983 and 1994).
