= Edwin Schultz (politician) =

American politician (1898–1969)

Member of the Nebraska Legislature from the 27th district
- In office January 2, 1945 – January 24, 1946
- Preceded by: Elmer Rakow
- Succeeded by: Nell Krause
- In office January 5, 1937 – January 7, 1941
- Preceded by: Position created
- Succeeded by: Elmer Rakow

Member of the Nebraska State Senate from the 21st district
- In office January 1, 1935 – January 5, 1937
- Preceded by: H. L. Kunkel
- Succeeded by: Position abolished

Personal details
- Born: October 31, 1898 Elgin, Nebraska
- Died: April 25, 1969 (aged 70) Tilden, Nebraska
- Party: Republican
- Spouse: Merle Farris (m. 1928)
- Occupation: Farmer

Oscar Edwin "Ed" Schultz (October 31, 1898 – April 25, 1969) was a Republican politician from Nebraska who served in the Nebraska State Senate from 1935 to 1937 and as a member of the Nebraska Legislature from the 27th district from 1937 to 1941 and again from 1945 to 1946.

== Early life ==
Schultz was born in Elgin, Nebraska, in 1898. He was a farmer, and served on the Elgin Board of Education.

== Nebraskas State Senate ==
In 1934, Schultz ran for the Nebraska State Senate from the 21st district, which was based in Antelope, Boone, and Wheeler counties. He won the Republican primary unopposed, and challenged incumbent Democratic State Senator H. L. Kunkel in the general election. Schultz narrowly defeated Kunkel, winning 51 percent of the vote to Kunkel's 49 percent.

== Nebraska Legislature ==
As the State Senate and State House were consolidated into the unicameral legislature in 1936, Schultz ran for the legislature from the newly created 27th district. In the nonpartisan primary, he faced Kunkel, State Representatives J. I. Stringfellow and John Washington Porter, and L. E. Hallstead and Walter Reynolds. Schultz and Stringfellow advanced to the general election, but after Stringfellow died on July 6, Reynoldson, the third-place finisher in the primary, was automatically placed on the ballot. Schultz narrowly defeated Reynoldson, winning 52 percent of the vote.

Schultz ran for re-election in 1938, and was challenged by Porter, who had run in the 1936 primary. He defeated Porter with 60 percent of the vote in the general election.

In 1940, Schultz declined to seek re-election, and instead ran for the Nebraska Railway Commission. In a crowded primary, he came in fourth, winning 12 percent of the vote to Richard H. Larson's 22 percent. He was succeeded in the legislature by Elmer Rakow.

Schultz ran for the state legislature again in 1944, and Rakow declined to seek a third term. He faced George Bruner and Raymond Medlen in the nonpartisan primary, and placed first by a wide margin, 61 percent of the vote to Bruner's 24 percent and Medlen's 15 percent. Schultz and Bruner proceeded to the general election, which Schultz won by a wide margin, defeating Bruner, 71–29 percent.

== Post-legislative career ==
Schultz, who had served on the State Fair Board, was elected secretary of the board on January 23, 1946, and announced that he would resign from the legislature. He retired as secretary in 1965.

== Death ==
Schultz died on April 25, 1969.
