= William M. Wylie =

American politician (1928–2006)

Member of the Nebraska Legislature
- In office January 5, 1965 – January 5, 1971
- Preceded by: Fannie Wylie
- Succeeded by: John DeCamp
- Constituency: 20th district (1965–1967); 40th district (1967–1971)

Personal details
- Born: May 10, 1928 Elgin, Nebraska
- Died: August 20, 2006 (aged 78) Neligh, Nebraska
- Party: Republican
- Parent(s): Matt Wylie (father); Fannie Wylie (mother)
- Relatives: John G. Donner (cousin)
- Education: University of Nebraska; Nebraska Wesleyan University
- Occupation: Auctioneer, broker, farmer

William M. Wylie (May 10, 1928 – August 20, 2006) was a Republican politician from Nebraska who served as a member of the Nebraska Legislature from 1965 to 1971.

Wylie was born in Elgin, Nebraska, in 1928. He graduated from Elgin High School and attended the University of Nebraska and Nebraska Wesleyan University. Wylie worked as an auctioner, real estate broker, and farmer.

In 1964, his father, State Senator Matt Wylie died, and Governor Frank B. Morrison appointed his mother, Fannie Wylie, was appointed to serve out the remaining months of the term. Wylie successfully ran to succeed his mother in the 20th district. He was re-elected in the 40th district following redistricting in 1966, and was defeated for re-election by John DeCamp in 1970. In 1974, Wylie ran for Lieutenant Governor, but was defeated in the Republican primary.

Wylie died on August 20, 2006.
