= Elmer Rakow =

American politician (1902–1995)

Member of the Nebraska Legislature from the 27th district
- In office January 7, 1941 – January 2, 1945
- Preceded by: Edwin Schultz
- Succeeded by: Edwin Schultz

Personal details
- Born: August 29, 1902 Neligh, Nebraska
- Died: February 24, 1995 (aged 92) Tilden, Nebraska
- Party: Republican; Democratic (former)
- Spouse(s): Viola Mulcahy (m. 1934; died 1986) Dorothy Gregor (m. 1987)
- Children: 1
- Education: University of Nebraska (LL.B.)
- Occupation: Attorney

Elmer C. Rakow (August 29, 1902 – February 24, 1995) was a Republican politician from Nebraska who served as a member of the Nebraska Legislature from the 27th district from 1941 to 1945.

== Early life ==
Rakow was born in Neligh, Nebraska, on August 29, 1902. He graduated from Neligh High School and the University of Nebraska, receiving his bachelor of laws in 1933. Rakow ran for Antelope County Attorney as the Democratic nominee in 1934, defeated incumbent Republican County Attorney Elven Butterfield. In 1938, Butterfield challenged Rakow for re-election and defeated him.

== Nebraska Legislature ==
In 1940, State Senator Edwin Schultz declined to seek re-election, instead unsuccessfully seeking the Republican nomination for Nebraska Railway Commission. Rakow ran to succeed Schultz in the 27th district, which included Antelope and Boone counties. In the nonpartisan primary, he faced James Howell and former State Representatives Elwell Johnston and J. W. Porter.

Rakow placed first in the primary, winning 33 percent of the vote, and advanced to the general election with Howell, who placed second with 23 percent. Rakow defeated Howell with 53 percent of the vote in the general election. Though the race was formally nonpartisan, Rakow had switched to the Nebraska Republican Party at the time of his election.

In 1942, Rakow was re-elected unopposed. He declined to seek a third term in 1944, and returned to his legal practice.

== Post-legislative career ==
Rakow ran unsuccessfully for the Ninth Judicial District Court in 1960, losing to incumbent Judge Fay Pollock.

== Death ==
Rakow died on February 24, 1995.
