= Nell Krause =

American politician (1895–1982)

Member of the Nebraska Legislature from the 27th district
- In office August 22, 1946 – January 7, 1947
- Preceded by: Edwin Schultz
- Succeeded by: Glenn Cramer

Personal details
- Born: August 22, 1895 Peoria, Illinois
- Died: July 21, 1982 (aged 86) Grand Island, Nebraska
- Party: Republican
- Spouse: Clyde Lauren Krause (m. 1919; died 1968)
- Children: 2
- Occupation: Homemaker, nurse

Military service
- Allegiance: United States
- Branch/service: Army Nurse Corps

Eleanor "Nell" Krause (née Keenan; August 22, 1895 – July 21, 1982) was a Republican politician from Nebraska who served as a member of the Nebraska Legislature from the 27th district from 1946 to 1947. She was the first woman to serve in the unicameral legislature.

== Early life ==
Nell Keenan was born in Peoria, Illinois, in 1895, and was trained as a nurse at John C. Proctor Hospital in Peoria. She served in the Army Nurse Corps during World War I. She was stationed at Fort Riley in Kansas, married Clyde Krause, and moved with him to Albion, Nebraska, later that year. Krause was a homemaker and was politically active, serving on the Nebraska Republican Party's State Central Committee.

== Nebraska Legislature ==
In 1946, State Senator Edwin Schultz resigned from the legislature to serve as secretary of the state fair board. After calling a special session of the legislature, Governor Dwight Griswold appointed Krause to serve out the remaining months of Schultz's term. Krause was vacationing with her husband at their house in Evergreen, Colorado, when she received a telegram from Griswold asking to appoint her. She and her husband purchased professional clothes in Denver and she took a train immediately to Lincoln, Nebraska, to participate in the two-week special session.

Krause, who became the first woman to sit in the unicameral legislature, (Note: Mabel Gillespie, Clara Humphrey, and Sarah Muir, who were elected to the Nebraska House of Representatives in 1924, were the first women elected to the state legislature in Nebraska, but Krause was the first to serve in the unicameral legislature, which was established in 1937.) was sworn in on August 22, 1946. As she began her service, she observed, "I have a suspicion many things rest on my shoulders unseen at present," and urged, "Don't accuse womanhood if I make a mistake, but blame it on Nell Krause." During the brief session, she later noted that she was "met with nothing but gentlemanliness in all the fellows," though noted that the female legislators who followed her "have done some rough sledding." She declined to seek re-election, citing her husband's poor health.

== Death ==
Krause died on July 21, 1982.
