= Benjamin F. Kramer =

American politician (born 1957)

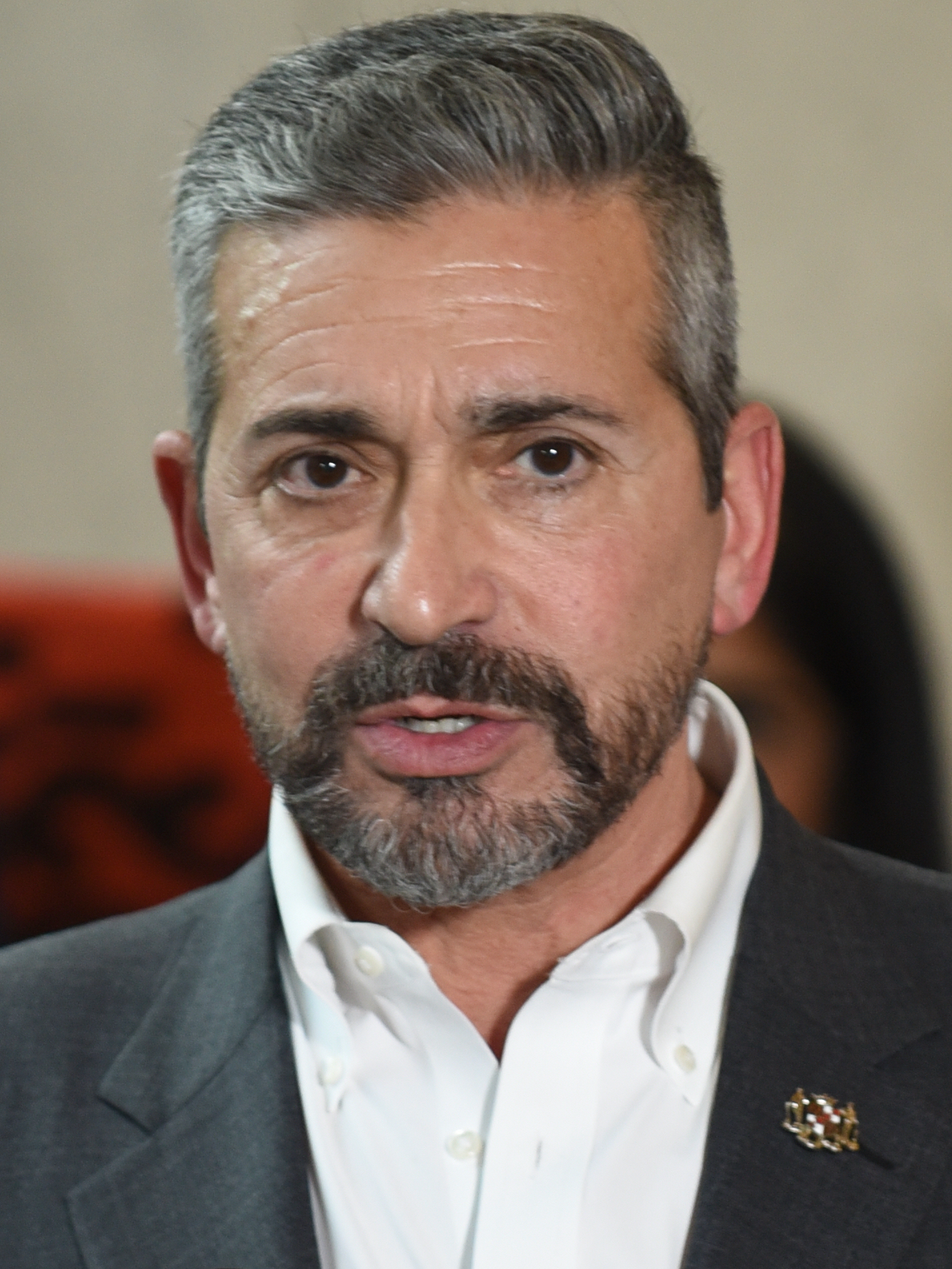

Member of the Maryland Senate from the 19th district
- Incumbent
- Assumed office January 9, 2019
- Preceded by: Roger Manno

Member of the Maryland House of Delegates from the 19th district
- In office January 10, 2007 – January 9, 2019
- Preceded by: Carol S. Petzold
- Succeeded by: Charlotte Crutchfield

Personal details
- Born: March 5, 1957 (age 69) Wheaton, Maryland, U.S.
- Party: Democratic
- Spouse: Tammy
- Children: 3
- Parent: Sidney Kramer (father)
- Relatives: Rona E. Kramer (sister)

Benjamin F. Kramer (born March 5, 1957) is an American politician who has served as a member of the Maryland Senate representing District 19 since 2019. A member of the Democratic Party, Kramer previously represented the district in the Maryland House of Delegates from 2007 to 2019.

== Background ==
Kramer was born in Wheaton, Maryland on March 5, 1957. He was one of three children born to father Sidney Kramer, who would later serve as a state senator and Montgomery County Executive, and mother Betty Mae. Kramer's sister, Rona, would later serve as a state senator and as Maryland Secretary of Aging from 2015 to 2023. He attended Montgomery County public schools, graduating from John F. Kennedy High School, and later attended the University of Maryland, College Park, where he received a Bachelor of Arts degree in law enforcement in 1979.

Kramer owns the Wheaton Speedy Car Wash and a real estate business. He was a member of the Montgomery County Liquor Control Task Force and the Montgomery County Police Department Citizens Advisory Board.

In 1994, Kramer unsuccessfully ran for the Montgomery County Council, losing to incumbent Republican county councilwoman Nancy Dacek in the general election. He ran for an at-large seat on the county council in 1998, during which he was defeated in the Democratic primary, placing seventh in the eight-way primary.

== In the legislature ==
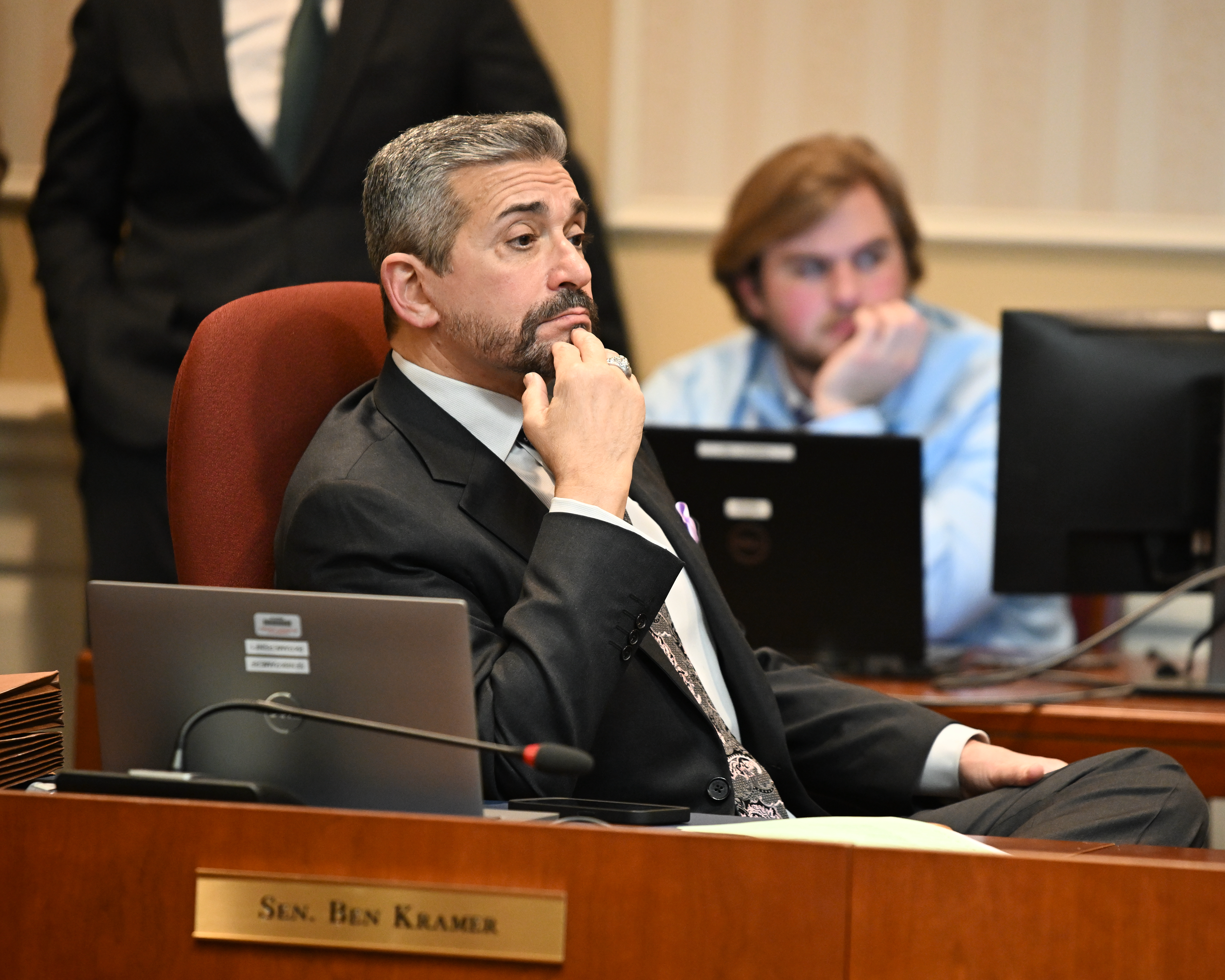
Kramer in the Senate Finance Committee, 2023

In 2006, Kramer ran for the Maryland House of Delegates in District 19. He won the Democratic primary on September 12, placing third with 14 percent of the vote and edging out his opponent, Paul Griffin, by a margin of 307 votes. He was sworn in on January 10, 2007. Kramer was a member of the Judiciary Committee from 2007 to 2010, afterwards serving in the Economic Matters Committee for the remainder of his tenure.

In 2009, Kramer unsuccessfully ran in the Montgomery County Council District 4 special election, in which he was defeated by Nancy Navarro.

In August 2017, a day after state Senator Roger Manno announced that he would run for Congress in Maryland's 6th congressional district in 2018, Kramer announced that he would seek to succeed Manno in the Maryland Senate. He ran unopposed in both the primary and defeated Green Party nominee David Jeang general election, and was sworn in on January 9, 2019. Kramer has served as a member of the Finance Committee during his entire tenure.

In March 2026, while Maryland first lady Dawn Moore was testifying in support of a bill to ban the sale of kratom and related products, Kramer made comments referring to Moore's physical appearance, adding "if you ever get bored with the governor... I'm just putting it out there". He later defended his remarks as an attempt at light-hearted humor. Senate President Bill Ferguson condemned Kramer's comments as inappropriate and said that the Joint Committee on Legislative Ethics "had an opportunity to review" his remarks, but did not disclose any decision of the panel.

== Political positions ==
Kramer is a moderate Democrat who has been described by Maryland Matters as "more pro-business than most of his Democratic colleagues".

=== Education ===
Kramer supports providing private schools with state funding.

During the 2019 legislative session, Kramer introduced a bill to expand Holocaust instruction in schools. After the bill died in committee, he penned a letter to the Maryland Department of Education asking the agency to elaborate its requirements for Holocaust education, led to the agency requiring lessons on the Holocaust in fourth- and fifth-grade social studies classes. The bill was reintroduced in 2023 along with another bill that would set aside $500,000 annually to fund school field trips to museums dedicated to teaching about the Holocaust or African American history.

In 2021, Kramer introduced legislation that would require the chancellor of the University System of Maryland to act on the behalf of all the system's institutions in all aspects of collective bargaining, and supported another bill to extend collective bargaining rights to Maryland community college employees. Both bills passed and became law.

During the 2026 legislative session, Kramer introduced a bill granting non-tenure track faculty at public universities the right to organize.

=== Environment ===
During the 2011 legislative session, Kramer expressed concerns with the costs of a bill to incentivize wind energy development in Maryland. He voted for the bill when was reintroduced in 2012.

In 2018, Kramer introduced legislation that would place economic sanctions on Pennsylvania for upstream pollution in the Chesapeake Bay by limiting Maryland's ability to enter into procurement contracts with companies that have not been meeting U.S. Environmental Protection Agency Chesapeake Bay cleanup goals.

During the 2020 legislative session, Kramer introduced legislation to levy a carbon tax on corporate polluters, which would charge $15 per metric ton of carbon dioxide emitted from non-transportation fossil fuel combustion. He reintroduced the bill in 2021, during which it was defeated in committee.

In 2021, Kramer introduced a bill that would require the Maryland Public Service Commission to consider climate change while reviewing applications for new generating facilities. In 2022, he introduced legislation that would require counties develop climate change mitigation plans. The bill was reintroduced in 2023.

=== Israel ===
Kramer is a self-described Zionist who has described the Boycott, Divestment and Sanctions (BDS) movement as antisemitic.

In December 2013, following the American Studies Association's boycott of Israel, Kramer wrote to Governor Martin O'Malley asking him to prevent state funding from going toward organizations that supported the boycott. During the 2014 legislative session, he unsuccessfully sought to place financial penalties on the University of Maryland, Baltimore County for supporting the American Studies Association, despite UMBC saying that it would end its affiliation with the ASA. The legislature instead opted to pass a resolution condemning the BDS movement, making Maryland the first state to do so, which Kramer said was "not the victory we should have had". Kramer's anti-BDS bill was also condemned by Archbishop Desmond Tutu, who issued a statement expressing "grave concern" over the effort and with Kramer's comparison between BDS and Nazi Germany. During the 2017 legislative session, Kramer introduced a bill that would prohibit the state from contracting with companies that support the BDS movement. After the bill failed to pass, Governor Larry Hogan signed an executive order codifying it into law.

In July 2019, Kramer wrote a letter to the Takoma Park city council and mayor Kate Stewart condemning the city's screening of The Occupation of the American Mind, a documentary which he described as antisemitic.

In November 2023, Kramer led a letter signed by eight other state senators that threatened to defund immigrants rights group CASA de Maryland because it had called for an immediate ceasefire in the Gaza war and condemned the "utilization of US tax dollars to promote the ongoing violence". He called CASA's subsequent apology a "good first step" but added that "there's still work to be done". In December 2024, Kramer condemned Maryland Senator Chris Van Hollen for his criticism of Israel's handling of the Israel–Hamas war and for voting for bills to block some military aid to Israel. He also argued that opponents of Israel were attacking the country's legitimacy through propaganda and misinformation after failing to destroy it militarily, and accused Van Hollen of "buying into the relentless propaganda campaign that is being orchestrated by Israel's enemies and the Jew-haters across the world".

=== Liquor reform ===
During the 2018 legislative session and in response to Peter Franchot's "Reform on Tap" efforts, Kramer introduced legislation creating a task force to study which agency is best suited to regulate the alcohol industry in Maryland. As a member of the task force, Kramer criticized Franchot for not including any advocates for public health or public safety in his task force to craft the Reform on Tap proposals, which the committee voted 17–4 to reject later that year and recommended removing the Comptroller of Maryland's ability to regulate the alcohol industry. During the 2019 legislative session, Kramer introduced legislation to do so, which passed and became law.

In February 2019, Franchot accused Kramer of being "corrupt" and having a conflict of interest by introducing the bill, noting that his family's real estate business rents space to a county-owned retail alcohol outlet. Kramer rejected these accusations and subsequently accused Franchot of taking campaign contributions from the alcohol industry that influenced his "Reform on Tap" proposals, which Franchot denied. While testifying on the bill later that month, Kramer compared Franchot to Bernie Madoff in claiming that he had "extorted" campaign contributions from liquor lobbyists, which Len Foxwell, Franchot's chief of staff, called "beyond offensive" and "slanderous", and led Franchot to file an ethics complaint against Kramer. Kramer criticized Governor Larry Hogan for appointing Foxwell to the alcohol commission, which he called a "political favor".

=== Redistricting ===
In November 2025, Kramer said he opposed redrawing Maryland's congressional districts to make Maryland's 1st congressional district more favorable for Democrats in response to Republican mid-decade redistricting efforts in various red states, citing the risk of losing seats to Republicans or the courts tossing out new maps.

=== Social issues ===
During the 2016 legislative session and following the death of Noah Leotta, a Montgomery County police officer who was killed by a drunk driver while on DUI patrol, Kramer introduced a bill to expand the use of breathalyzers, which passed and was signed into law by Governor Larry Hogan.

During the 2018 legislative session, Kramer introduced a bill that would prohibit retail pet stores from selling puppies and kittens, which passed and was signed into law by Governor Larry Hogan. In May 2022, he participated in and spoke at a protest against Inotiv, a drug research firm headquartered in Montgomery County, after the Humane Society of the United States released a video accusing the firm of mistreating and killing thousands of animals in its studies.

During the 2019 legislative session, Kramer introduced a bill creating a program that would have the Maryland Department of Aging perform daily check-in calls to seniors and notify guardians if they do not answer the call. The bill passed and became law, and was implemented in January 2020. In 2022, he opposed a bill that would set restrictions on who the governor of Maryland could appoint as Maryland Secretary of Aging, which he called a "slippery slope".

In July 2020, after Governor Larry Hogan announced plans to hold a full in-person election for Maryland's general elections, Kramer participated in and spoke at a CASA de Maryland rally protesting Hogan's decision, where he accused the governor of prioritizing his autobiography over Maryland's right to vote. During the 2021 legislative session, he introduced a bill that would allow voters to opt into a list that allows them to receive mail-in ballots for every future election, which passed and became law.

During the 2023 legislative session, Kramer introduced legislation that would allow victims of hate crimes to sue their perpetrators to recoup emotional and financial damages.

=== Taxes ===
During the 2023 legislative session, Kramer opposed a bill that would raise taxes on Ocean City hotels by one percent, expressing concerns that the bill would increase tourism to beaches in Delaware or New Jersey.

== Personal life ==
Kramer is married to his wife, Tammy. Together, they have three children. He is Jewish. Kramer's nephews, Brandon and Lance, were the director and producer for the 2021 documentary The First Step.

== Electoral history ==
Montgomery County Council District 2 Democratic primary election, 1994
Party	Candidate	Votes	%
Democratic	Benjamin F. Kramer	6,315	100

Montgomery County Council District 2 election, 1994
Party	Candidate	Votes	%
Republican	Nancy Dacek (incumbent)	9,988	60.5%
Democratic	Benjamin F. Kramer	6,516	39.5%

Montgomery County Council District 3 Democratic primary election, 1994
Party	Candidate	Votes	%
Democratic	Benjamin F. Kramer	6,315	100

Montgomery County Council at-large Democratic primary election, 1998
Party	Candidate	Votes	%
Democratic	Ike Leggett	49,615	20.5
Democratic	Michael L. Subin	35,274	14.6
Democratic	Blair G. Ewing	33,849	14.0
Democratic	Steven Silverman	29,239	12.1
Democratic	Patrick Baptiste	28,542	11.8
Democratic	Frances Brenneman	25,960	10.7
Democratic	Benjamin Kramer	21,779	9.0
Democratic	William B. O'Neil Jr.	17,245	7.1

Maryland House of Delegates District 19 Democratic primary election, 2006
Party	Candidate	Votes	%
Democratic	Roger Manno	7,389	20.3
Democratic	Henry B. Heller (incumbent)	6,476	17.8
Democratic	Benjamin F. Kramer	5,119	14.0
Democratic	Paul Griffin	4,812	13.2
Democratic	Alec Stone	4,641	12.7
Democratic	Tom DeGonia	3,781	10.4
Democratic	Melodye A. Berry	2,369	6.5
Democratic	Guled Kassim	1,868	5.1

Maryland House of Delegates District 19 election, 2006
Party	Candidate	Votes	%
Democratic	Henry B. Heller (incumbent)	24,928	23.6
Democratic	Benjamin F. Kramer	24,707	23.3
Democratic	Roger Manno	24,598	23.2
Republican	John R. Joaquin	10,647	10.1
Republican	Thomas Hardman	10,474	9.9
Republican	Tom Masser	10,348	9.8
Write-in		141	0.1

Montgomery County Council District 4 special Democratic primary election, 2009
Party	Candidate	Votes	%
Democratic	Nancy Navarro	3,881	44.5
Democratic	Ben Kramer	3,819	43.8
Democratic	Cary Lamari	730	8.4
Democratic	Robert Goldman	118	1.4
Democratic	Thomas Hardman	105	1.2
Democratic	Michael L. Bigler	65	0.8

Maryland House of Delegates District 19 election, 2010
Party	Candidate	Votes	%
Democratic	Ben Kramer (incumbent)	23,526	25.8
Democratic	Sam Arora	22,242	24.4
Democratic	Bonnie Cullison	21,795	23.9
Republican	Linn Rivera	11,929	13.1
Republican	Tom Masser	11,362	12.5
Write-in		288	0.3

Maryland House of Delegates District 19 election, 2014
Party	Candidate	Votes	%
Democratic	Benjamin F. Kramer (incumbent)	22,238	29.0
Democratic	Bonnie Cullison (incumbent)	21,394	27.9
Democratic	Maricé Morales	20,104	26.2
Republican	Martha Schaerr	12,622	16.5
Write-in		336	0.4

Maryland Senate District 19 Democratic primary election, 2018
Party	Candidate	Votes	%
Democratic	Benjamin F. Kramer	13,739	100

Maryland Senate District 19 election, 2018
Party	Candidate	Votes	%
Democratic	Benjamin F. Kramer	39,393	88.0
Green	David Jeang	4,795	10.7
Write-in		574	1.3

Maryland Senate District 19 election, 2018
Party	Candidate	Votes	%
Democratic	Benjamin F. Kramer	29,473	75.5
Republican	Anita M. Cox	8,804	22.6
Green	David Jeang	724	1.9
Write-in		34	0.1
