= Matt Wylie =

American politician (1890–1964)

Member of the Nebraska Legislature from the 27th district
- In office January 3, 1961 – May 18, 1964
- Preceded by: John G. Donner
- Succeeded by: Fannie Wylie

Personal details
- Born: 1890 Antelope County, Nebraska
- Died: May 18, 1964 (aged 74) Elgin, Nebraska
- Party: Republican
- Spouse: Fannie Wylie (m. 1924)
- Children: 3 (including William)
- Relatives: John G. Donner (nephew)
- Occupation: Farmer, livestock breeder

Matthew Wylie (1889 or 1890 – May 18, 1964) was a Republican politician from Nebraska who served as a member of the Nebraska Legislature from the 27th district from 1961 until his death in 1964.

== Early life ==
Wylie was born in Antelope County, Nebraska, and was a farmer and livestock breeder in Elgin. He served as treasurer of the township, and was elected to the Antelope County Board of Supervisors in 1946 as a Republican, serving until 1949. In 1948, he unsuccessfully sought the Republican nomination for County Assessor.

== Nebraska Legislature ==
In 1960, State Senator John G. Donner, Wylie's nephew, declined to seek a third term, instead running for Lieutenant Governor. Wylie ran to succeed him in the 27th district, which included Antelope and Boone counties. In the nonpartisan primary, he faced businessman and band director George Fritton. Fritton narrowly placed first in the primary, receiving 30 more votes than Wylie. At the general election, Wylie led Fritton by 7 votes on election night, and once all votes were tabulated, Wylie won by 30 votes.

Wylie sought re-election in 1962, but did not announce his campaign for several months. Donner initially filed to run, but withdrew from the race to instead run for the county board of supervisors, and Wylie ran for a second term. He was challenged by Charles Beckwith and John Homan. In the primary, Wylie placed first, receiving 40 percent of the vote, and advanced to the general election with Homan, who placed second with 31 percent. Wylie narrowly defeated Homan, winning 51 percent of the vote.

In 1964, Wylie declined to seek re-election.

== Death ==
Wylie died on May 18, 1964, of a heart attack. His wife, Fannie Wylie, was appointed by Governor Frank B. Morrison to serve out his remaining term, and one of his sons, William M. Wylie, was elected to succeed him later that year.
