= Maricé Morales =

American politician (born 1987)

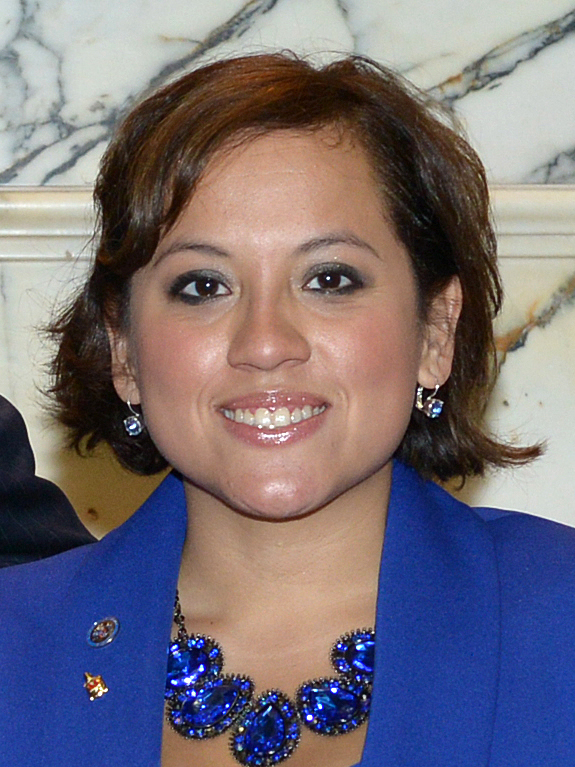
- Morales in 2015

Member of the Maryland House of Delegates from the 19th legislative district
- In office January 14, 2015 – January 9, 2019
- Preceded by: Sam Arora
- Succeeded by: Vaughn Stewart

Personal details
- Born: June 12, 1987 (age 39) Arlington, Virginia, U.S.
- Party: Democratic
- Education: George Mason University; University of Maryland School of Law (JD)
- Profession: Attorney
- Website: Campaign web site

Maricé Morales (/ˌmɑːriˈseɪ/ MAR-ee-SAY; born June 12, 1987) is an attorney and a politician from Montgomery County, Maryland. She represented District 19 in the Maryland House of Delegates.

== Early life and education ==
Maricé Ivette Morales was born in Arlington, Virginia, in 1987. Her father is from Chimbote, Peru, and her mother is from Chiclayo, Peru. She lived in Peru from age 12 to 17, when she returned to the United States to attend college.

Morales graduated from George Mason University with a bachelor's degree in Global Affairs and French and a master's degree in public policy. She received a Juris Doctor from the University of Maryland School of Law and received a public service award from the law school. While in law school, Morales competed in the National Latina/o Law Student Association's sixth annual moot court competition.

== Career ==
Morales served as Senate Special Assistant to District 19 Senator Roger Manno. She also worked as a prevailing wage investigator for the District of Columbia Building Construction Trades Council.

Morales ran for the Maryland House of Delegates in 2014, to represent the state's 19th legislative district, which includes parts of Silver Spring, Aspen Hill, and Gaithersburg. She ran to replace Sam Arora, who did not seek reelection.

Morales supports equal educational opportunities for all Marylanders. She also emphasizes labor laws protecting immigrants from exploitation. Her candidacy was endorsed by CASA in Action, Maryland State and District of Columbia AFL-CIO, Montgomery County Volunteer Fire and Rescue Association, Fraternal Order of Police Lodge 35, United Auto Workers, United Food and Commercial Workers Local 1994, NARAL Pro-Choice Maryland PAC, American Federation of State, County and Municipal Employees Maryland, Maryland Votes for Animals, and Maryland League of Conservation Voters. The Washington Post's editorial board endorsed her campaign.

Morales won the general election, and her term of office began on January 14, 2015.

For her first term of office, Morales is a member of the Judiciary Committee, the Criminal Justice Subcommittee of the Judiciary Committee, the Family Law Subcommittee of the Judiciary Committee, and the Women Legislators of Maryland. In addition, Morales joined the newly formed Maryland Latino Legislative Caucus, a caucus formed to express the views of the Latino community, increase Latino voting, support Latino businesses, and support Latinos in local leadership.

Morales co-sponsored the "Death with Dignity Act", which would allow a licensed health care professional to withhold or withdraw a medically administered life-sustaining procedure to an adult with a terminal illness if the person requests so, both orally and in writing, witnessed by two individuals. The Death with Dignity National Center supports the bill, calling it a tremendous comfort to patients who are terminally ill and to their families. The Maryland Catholic Conference is opposed to the bill, saying the bill does not require medical professionals to assess the patient for depression, it does not require an independent witness when administering the dose, and it does not require patients to notify family members.

Morales sponsored the Maryland Law Enforcement and Governmental Trust Act, which would have left immigration enforcement to federal authorities rather than state and local police. It also would have required federal authorities to have a warrant in order to transfer an undocumented immigrant from state or local authorities to federal authorities. The aim of the bill was to help undocumented immigrants feel like they can call the police or 911 when they are a victims of a crime without being afraid of being arrested themselves on immigration charges. State and local police could still arrest and detain perpetrators of state and local crimes, regardless of their immigration status. The Trust Act passed the Maryland House of Delegates, but the Maryland Senate did not vote on it, and it did not become law.

Morales was a member of the Workgroup to Study Safe Harbor Policy for Youth Victims of Human Trafficking. The Workgroup is studying the subject of minors who are victims of human trafficking and what legal protections and services Maryland should offer them.

Morales did not win reelection in 2018. In the Democratic primary election, where the top three candidates advance to the general election, Morales came in fourth place with 16 percent of the vote.

After the election, Morales started a law firm that specializes in immigration law, criminal law, accidents, traffic violations, and DUIs.

In 2019, Governor Larry Hogan appointed Morales to the board of trustees of Montgomery College. Her six-year term began in 2019. Morales also serves on the board of directors of Emerge Maryland, an organization that recruits and trains women to run for elected office as Democrats in Maryland.

In 2022, Morales ran to represent District 6 on the Montgomery County Council. Morales came in second place.

== Election history ==
=== 2014 Maryland House of Delegates District 19 primary election ===
Democratic Primary Results
Party	Candidate	Votes	%
Democratic	Ben Kramer	8,196	29
Democratic	Bonnie Cullison	6,279	22
Democratic	Maricé Morales	4,894	17
Democratic	Charlotte Crutchfield	4,512	16
Democratic	Paul Bardack	3,679	13
Democratic	Melodye A. Berry	1,238	4

=== 2014 Maryland House of Delegates District 19 general election ===
General Election Results
Party	Candidate	Votes	%
Democratic	Ben Kramer	20,817	29
Democratic	Bonnie Cullison	20,009	28
Democratic	Maricé Morales	18,833	26
Republican	Martha Schaerr	11,836	16
	write-in	315	0

=== 2018 Maryland House of Delegates District 19 primary election ===
Democratic Primary Results
Party	Candidate	Votes	%
Democratic	Bonnie Cullison	7,209	21
Democratic	Charlotte Cruchfield	6,166	18
Democratic	Vaughn Stewart	5,939	17
Democratic	Maricé Morales	5,492	16
Democratic	Marlin Jenkins	4,531	13
Democratic	Brian Crider	3,037	9
Democratic	Carl Ward	1,830	5
Democratic	Jade Wiles, Jr.	855	2

=== 2022 Montgomery County Council District 6 primary election ===
Democratic Primary Results
Party	Candidate	Votes	%
Democratic	Natali Fani Gonzalez	9,028	56
Democratic	Maricé Morales	2,636	16
Democratic	Omar Lazo	1,422	9
Democratic	Steve Solomon	1,390	9
Democratic	Christa Tichy	723	5
Democratic	Vicki S. Vergagni	402	3
Democratic	Brit Siman-Tov	252	2
Democratic	Mark Trullinger	173	1
