= Vaughn Stewart (politician) =

American politician (born 1988)

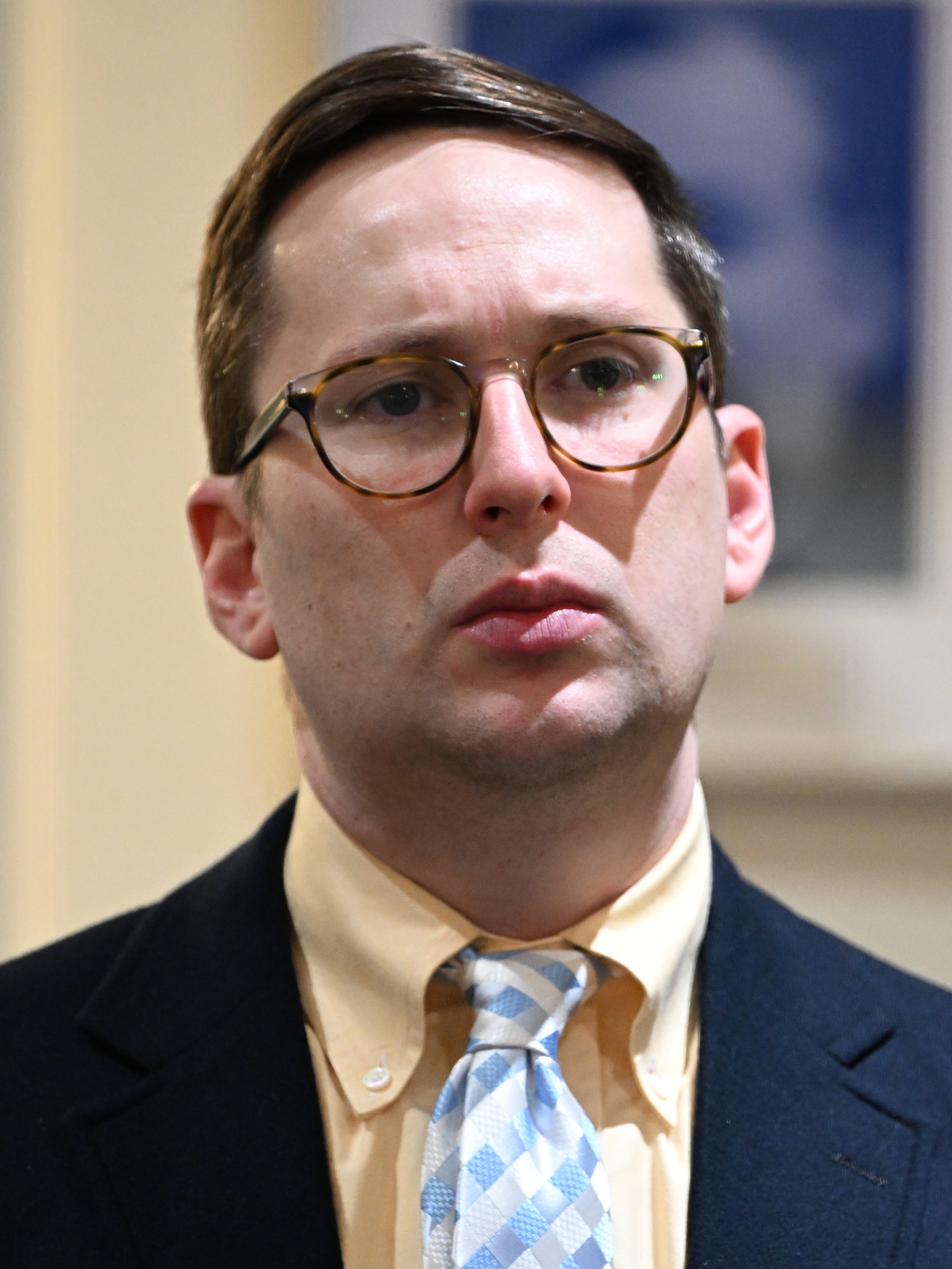
- Stewart in 2025

Member of the Maryland House of Delegates from the 19th district
- Incumbent
- Assumed office January 9, 2019 Serving with Charlotte Crutchfield and Bonnie Cullison
- Preceded by: Maricé Morales

Personal details
- Born: Vaughn Morton Stewart III; November 15, 1988 (age 38) Anniston, Alabama, U.S.
- Party: Democratic
- Other political affiliations: Democratic Socialists of America
- Spouse: Alexandra Tucker (m. 2016)
- Children: 2
- Education: University of Pennsylvania (BA); New York University (JD)
- Occupation: Attorney
- Website: votevaughn.com

Vaughn Morton Stewart III (born November 15, 1988) is an American attorney and politician. He is a member of the Maryland House of Delegates, representing District 19 in Montgomery County since 2019.

== Early life and education ==
Stewart was born on November 15, 1988, in Anniston, Alabama, to father Vaughn Stewart Jr., who served as the mayor of Anniston from 2012 to 2016, and mother Eva Sproull Andrews. He graduated from The Donoho School in 2007, and later attended the University of Pennsylvania, where he earned a bachelor's degree in political science in 2011, and New York University, where he earned a Juris Doctor degree in 2014.

== Career ==
After graduating from law school, Stewart moved to Nashville, Tennessee, where he worked as a law clerk for U.S. District Court Judge John Trice Nixon and as a legal intern for the White House Domestic Policy Council. He later worked as a summer associate with WilmerHale and on pro bono matters, such as legal assistance to refugees. In the summer of 2011, Stewart worked as a staff writer for The Anniston Star.

Stewart first became involved in politics in 2015 as a policy director for Maryland state senator Jamie Raskin's congressional campaign in Maryland's 8th congressional district. He later served as the treasurer and precinct chairperson of the District 19 Democratic Club, and on the boards of the Action Committee for Transit and the Montgomery County Renters Alliance.

In August 2017, Stewart declared his candidacy for the Maryland House of Delegates in District 19. He came in third place in the Democratic primary, receiving 16.9 percent of the vote. He won the general election with 24 percent of the vote.

== In the legislature ==
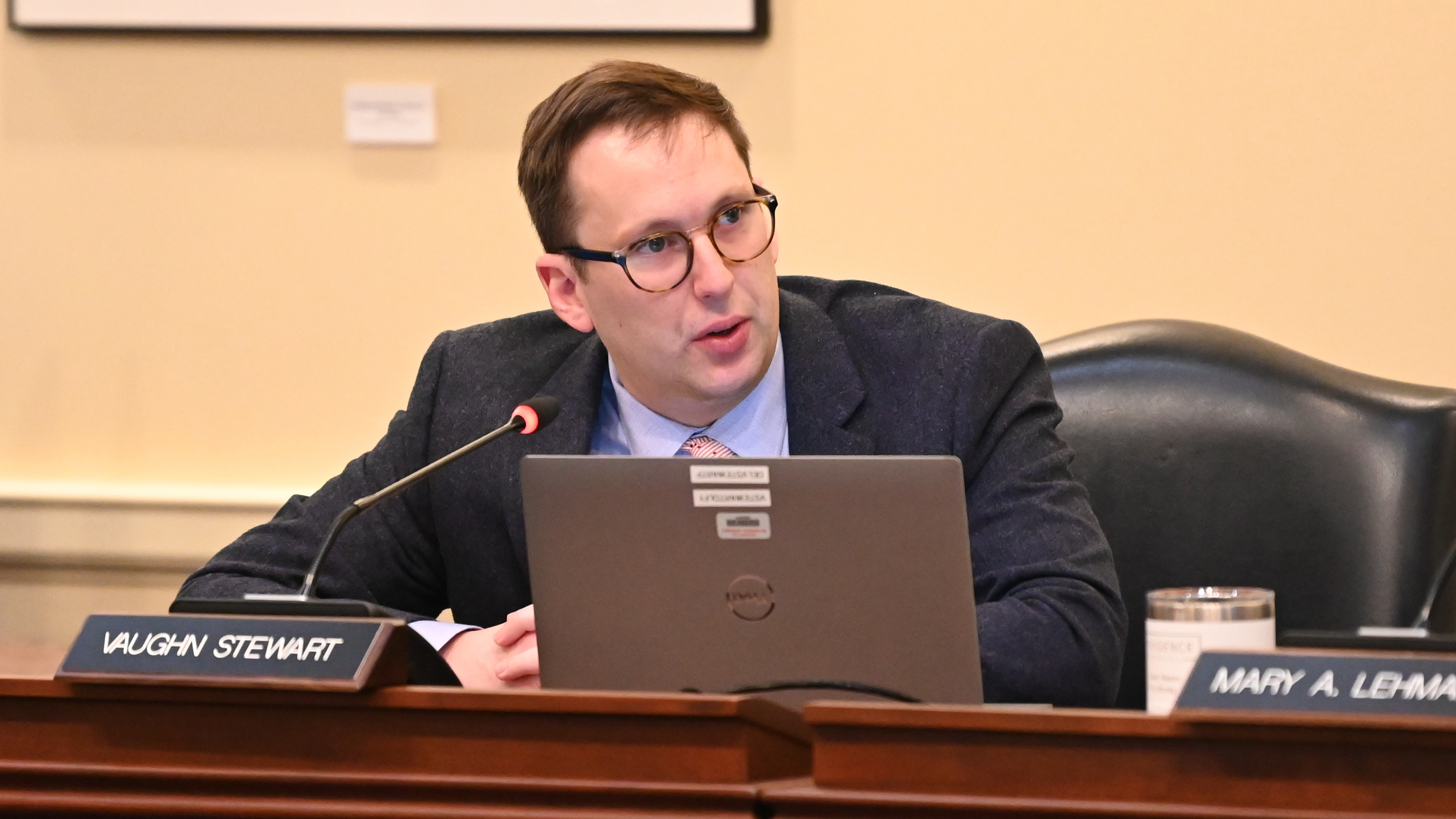
Stewart in the Environment and Transportation Committee, 2024

Stewart was sworn into the Maryland General Assembly on January 9, 2019. He has served as member of the Environment and Transportation Committee until 2027, afterwards serving on the Economic Matters Committee. In 2022, House Speaker Adrienne A. Jones appointed Stewart to lead the newly created "Progressive Policy Forum" within the House Democratic Caucus. In 2023, Jones appointed Stewart as one of two Chief Majority Whips for the Maryland House of Delegates.

During the 2020 presidential election, Stewart ran to be a national delegate at the Democratic National Convention pledged to Bernie Sanders.

== Political positions ==
=== Ethics reform ===
During the 2026 legislative session, Stewart introduced a bill clarifying that county-level inspectors general are not subject to standard Maryland Public Information Act request restrictions when conducting investigations.

=== Health care ===
In between chemotherapy treatments, Stewart studied health care policy. He supports proposals to regulate prescription drug manufacturers like public utilities and to create a statewide universal health care system.

=== Housing ===
Stewart introduced legislation during the 2019 legislative session that would increase affordable housing units and condominiums. The bill would ease zoning restrictions for high-density housing, introduce new real-estate transaction fees to fund public housing projects, and allow tenants to terminate leases in cases of unsafe housing or harassment by landlords. The bill was reintroduced during the 2020 and 2022 legislative sessions.

In March 2019, Stewart voted in favor of legislation that would require landlords to give a reason for evicting a tenant. The bill was rejected by the House Environment and Transportation Committee in a 2–17 vote.

During the 2021 legislative session, Stewart introduced a bill that would require landlords that own properties that use well water to test for a series of contaminants every three years.

During the 2022 legislative session, Stewart introduced legislation that would delay an eviction when a tenant can prove they have applied for rental assistance. The bill passed both chambers. He also introduced the "Tenant Protection Act of 2022", which establishes rules and procedures for landlords who give tenants ratio utility bills. The bill passed both chambers and became law without the governor's signature.

During the 2024 legislative session, Stewart introduced a bill to make it easier for tenants to put their rent payments in escrow if their landlord neglects life-threatening defects in their residence.

=== Immigration ===
Stewart introduced the "Dignity Not Detention Act" during the 2021 legislative session, which prohibits jurisdictions from contracting with U.S. Immigration and Customs Enforcement (ICE) to detain undocumented immigrants in local jails. The bill passed, but was vetoed by Governor Larry Hogan. The Legislature voted to override Hogan's veto on December 7, 2021. During the 2026 legislative session, Stewart introduced bills to ban ICE arrests at state courthouses and set minimum safety inspection standards for immigration detention facilities in the state.

=== Marijuana ===
In 2018, Vaughn supported the legalization of marijuana.

=== Minimum wage ===
Stewart co-sponsored legislation introduced during the 2019 legislative session that would raise the state's minimum wage to $15 an hour.

=== Social issues ===
During the 2020 legislative session, Stewart introduced a bill to create a multi-state compact to end corporate tax breaks aimed at getting businesses aimed to move across state lines.

In February 2020, Stewart co-sponsored legislation that would investigate the possibility of distributing reparations to the descendants of enslaved Africans.

Stewart introduced legislation during the 2022 legislative session that would prohibit the Governor of Maryland from using apps that automatically destroy text messages. He also introduced legislation that would amend the Constitution of Maryland to set up an ombudsman elected position in Maryland, which would "receive, respond to, and investigate ethics complains" against state officials. The bill did not receive a committee vote.

In May 2022, Stewart attended a protest in Rockville, Maryland against the alleged mistreatment of hundreds of animals at Inotiv's Indiana drug toxicity lab.

=== Transportation ===
Stewart supports increasing funding for monorail projects, including a proposal that would build a 27-mile monorail line between Shady Grove and Frederick, Maryland.

Stewart introduced legislation during the 2019 legislative session that would increase the minimum fine against drivers who fail to yield to a pedestrian to $150, with fines larger than the minimum amount going toward improving pedestrian safety. The bill passed and became law. He also introduced legislation that would require state-funded highway projects or projects built through public-private partnerships to go through environmental studies.

== Personal life ==
Stewart married Alexandra Tucker Stewart, an attorney at WilmerHale, on May 29, 2016. Their wedding was officiated by U.S. Court of Appeals judge Pamela Harris. Together, they live in Derwood, Maryland and have two children.

Stewart is a two-time cancer survivor. He was diagnosed with salivary gland cancer in 2007 and non-Hodgkin's lymphoma in 2017. Both cancers have since gone into remission.

== Electoral history ==
Maryland House of Delegates District 19 Democratic Election, 2018
Party	Candidate	Votes	%
Democratic	Bonnie Cullison	7,209	21
Democratic	Charlotte Crutchfield	6,166	18
Democratic	Vaughn M. Stewart	5,939	17
Democratic	Maricé Morales	5,492	16
Democratic	Marlin Jenkins	4,531	13
Democratic	Brian Crider	3,037	9
Democratic	Carl Ward	1,830	5
Democratic	Jade Wiles, Jr.	855	2

Maryland House of Delegates District 19 General Election, 2018
Party	Candidate	Votes	%
Democratic	Charlotte Crutchfield	34,507	26
Democratic	Bonnie L. Cullison	33,690	25
Democratic	Vaughn M. Stewart	32,636	24
Republican	Helen Domenici	10,460	8
Republican	David Pasti	12,234	9
Republican	Martha Schaerr	10,651	8

Male Delegates to the Democratic National Convention Primary Election, District 6, 2020
Party	Candidate	Votes	%
Democratic	Joseph Brecker (Biden)	62,220	17.5
Democratic	Larry Kasecamp (Biden)	59,947	16.9
Democratic	Devang Shah (Biden)	57,368	16.1
Democratic	Thomas G. Slater (Biden)	57,318	16.1
Democratic	Gabriel Acevero (Sanders)	15,939	4.5
Democratic	Bobby Bartlett (Sanders)	12,926	3.6
Democratic	Raef Haggag (Sanders)	12,594	3.5
Democratic	Vaughn Stewart (Sanders)	12,450	3.5
Democratic	Andrew Duck (Warren)	6,017	1.7
Democratic	Christopher DeVore (Warren)	4,948	1.4
Democratic	Daniel Jacoby (Warren)	4,038	1.1
Democratic	Brian Gaither (Warren)	4,013	1.1
Democratic	Manuel Martinez Salgado (Buttigieg)	4,013	1.1
Democratic	Camber A. Vincent (Warren)	3,713	1.0
Democratic	Jason A. Malott (Buttigieg)	2,983	0.8
Democratic	Mumin A. Barre (Klobuchar)	2,900	0.8
Democratic	Kirill Reznik (Buttigieg)	2,718	0.8
Democratic	Mark Jafari (Klobuchar)	2,411	0.7
Democratic	Philip Sunshine (Klobuchar)	2,350	0.7
Democratic	Jerry S. Garson (Uncommitted)	2,331	0.7
Democratic	Nickolas A. Jackson (Yang)	1,896	0.5
Democratic	Mudit Verma (Yang)	1,830	0.5
Democratic	Jim Michaels (Bloomberg)	1,665	0.5
Democratic	Csanad Petru Ignat (Yang)	1,649	0.5
Democratic	Joseph Merchlinsky (Yang)	1,616	0.5
Democratic	Benjamin Smith (Yang)	1,560	0.4
Democratic	Jason Ray Hutchison (Bloomberg)	1,502	0.4
Democratic	Jayson L. Spiegel (Bloomberg)	1,394	0.4
Democratic	William P. Spencer, II (Yang)	1,276	0.4
Democratic	Barry Kissin (Gabbard)	1,057	0.3
Democratic	Roy D. Jaquez (Gabbard)	885	0.2
Democratic	James Vaccaro (Gabbard)	737	0.2
Democratic	Ronald A. Beattie (Steyer)	885	0.2
Democratic	Nicholas L. Smith (Steyer)	374	0.1
