= The Occupation of the American Mind =

2016 American film on Israeli lobbying

- Promotional release poster
- Directed by: Loretta Alper; Jeremy Earp
- Narrated by: Roger Waters
- Production company: Media Education Foundation
- Release date: December 2016
- Running time: 84 minutes
- Country: United States
- Language: English

The Occupation of the American Mind is a 2016 American documentary film directed by Loretta Alper and Jeremy Earp, and narrated by Roger Waters. The film seeks to show how the Israeli government and pro-Israel lobby groups use their influence in the American media to shape the views of the American people on its control of the West Bank and Gaza. According to Al Jazeera, the film explores the United States' steadfast support for Israel in the face of the latter's controversial actions, seeking to show how "information warfare" waged by Israel and its supporters managed perceptions about the Israeli–Palestinian conflict and won over the hearts and minds of Americans for the last 50 years.

The original film was released in December 2016, with a shorter abridged version being released in October 2023 following the October 7 attacks and the start of the Gaza war and genocide. People interviewed for the film include Yousef Munayyer, Rula Jebreal, Max Blumenthal, Mark Crispin Miller, Rashid Khalidi, Noam Chomsky, Phyllis Bennis, and Stephen Walt.

== Plot ==
The Occupation of the American Mind sought to show how Israeli attacks on Palestinians provoked widespread protests around the world, while the United States remained steadfast in its support for Israel despite the crimes committed.

The documentary begins with screening the 2014 war in Gaza in which, the film alleges, Israel dropped nearly 20,000 tons of explosives on Gaza in 51 days, killing more than 2,000 Palestinians, injuring tens of thousands, the vast majority civilians.

According to the Washington Report, the film continues to show that after a public reaction to the 1982 attack on Lebanon, Israel commissioned Frank Luntz, an American public relations adviser who had helped influence Republican campaigns, "to come up with a strategy to sell Israeli military actions to the Americans who bankroll it." This report further argues that Luntz created a "Global Language Dictionary that is still used today to frame the Israeli narrative." He advised Israeli supporters to "always portray Israeli military action as self-defense. Speakers should focus on terror, not territory." According to this report, Luntz realized that "Israel couldn’t make heart-rending photos from Lebanon and Gaza go away, but it could saturate the media with talking points to make Americans believe that Palestinians deserved whatever Israel hit them with." According to the experts interviewed in the documentary, any criticism of Israel is labeled as antisemitic, and only self-hating Jews do not approve of apartheid and the occupation of Palestinian land. The report further states: "When a reporter, like Ayman Mohyeldin from NBC, shows empathy for children slaughtered playing ball on the beach, supporters are asked to demand that he is removed from Gaza. When Bob Simon or Mike Wallace dare to criticize Israel on 60 Minutes they are described as self-hating Jews."

According to the film, a CNN/ORC poll conducted in 2014 found that 40 percent of Americans believed that Israel was using excessive force against the people of Gaza. Sut Jhally who was interviewed in the film, says;

What we've seen is another kind of occupation – an occupation of American media and the American mind by a pro-Israel narrative that's deflected attention away from what virtually everyone recognizes as the best way to resolve this conflict: end the occupation and the settlements so that Palestinians can finally have a state of their own.

== Controversies ==
=== 2019 screening in Takoma Park, MD ===
The documentary was scheduled to be shown at a community center in Takoma Park, Maryland, but was postponed for a month after the Jewish Community Relations Council (JCRC) of Washington protested the city government's sponsorship of the showing. One resident wrote Mayor Kate Stewart, "I strongly believe that this film is not in keeping with the spirit or criteria for 'We are Takoma'/Takoma Park Arts. The films that are screened as part of Takoma Park Arts are supposed to be shown in conjunction with 'Docs in Progress.' Specifically, the Takoma Park Arts website states: 'Screenings feature documentaries on a wide range of topics, providing filmmakers with feedback from the audience on work in progress. The series is offered in partnership with Docs in Progress.' This film is not affiliated with Docs in Progress, and to my knowledge, the filmmakers will not be there to receive feedback from the audience. Thus, it appears that this screening doesn't even comply with the criteria for Takoma Park Arts film screenings."

The city eventually showed a 45-minute version instead of the full 84 minutes, to provide an opportunity for discussion after the viewing. (Note: Both versions are provided for free on www.occupationmovie.org.) After the screening, a panel discussion was held with representatives of the Jewish Voice for Peace and the Council on American-Islamic Relations. Prior to the screening of the documentary, city officials asked the Jewish Community Relations Council of Greater Washington to participate, but they declined the request since they believed the other participants of the panel were "opposed to the very existence of the State of Israel".

Benjamin F. Kramer, a member of the Maryland House of Delegates, condemned the city's sponsorship of the film, saying: "What is next on the agenda ... Should we reflect on 1933 Germany for just a little guidance? ... Perhaps soon you will require your Jewish business owners to place Stars of David on their storefronts so that later it will be easier to identify them and smash their windows, or perhaps just a government promoted synagogue burning or two ... after all, it's just the Jews." Peter Franchot, Maryland's comptroller, also expressed opposition to the film's screening and its content. He said the "city council need to make the call today to cancel this showing and relegate this movie—and its anti-Semitic values—back to the dark fringes of our society." Eight out of the nine members of the Montgomery County Council similarly asked for cancelling the screening of the documentary as they said the film was anti-Jewish. Tom Hucker, the only member of the council who did not sign the request, said that he was not comfortable doing so when he had not seen the film yet. Ron Halber, the executive director of the Jewish Community Relations Council of Greater Washington, who preferred not to participate in the screening, said, "We have a city that has decided to spend taxpayer dollars on a discredited film that is anti-Semitic in nature." He added that the film "could have been written by the Hamas propaganda playbook."

Benjamin Douglas, a member of Jewish Voice For Peace of DC Metro, while noting that the JCRC does not speak for all Jewish people, said: "we want people to watch the movie and decide for themselves". Zainab Chaudry, the Maryland Director for the Council on American–Islamic Relations, said "If we shut down debate, then we're basically saying it's my way or the highway, and that's not government's place to say that." Deepak Kenkeremath, an organizer of a yearly "Voices from the Holy Land" event, who attended the circle of protesters who gathered outside the community, considered the event as a case study: "Here we are with protesters waving banners and signs claiming this film is anti-Semitic when they haven’t even seen it". He continued to say that the fact that the screening was not canceled would show other local jurisdictions not to back down.

=== Attempted screening at Jackson-Reed High School ===
The Arab Student Union, a student group at Jackson-Reed High School, cooperated with the ACLU of DC to file a lawsuit against their school for refusing to allow them to show the film, citing grounds for showing the film under the First Amendment. The school leadership then reached an agreement with the student group allowing them to screen one of three alternative films (The Wanted 18, Farha, or 5 Broken Cameras).
