= Fannie Wylie =

American, teacher, office clerk, assistant bookkeeper, and politician

Fannie Bell (née Haggard) Wylie (August 18, 1894 – January 25, 1971) was an American teacher, office clerk, assistant bookkeeper, and politician.

Born in Trumbull, Nebraska, Wylie went to University of Colorado and Cotner College. She was a teacher, assistant bookkeeper, and office clerk. Wylie was married to Matt Wylie who served in the Nebraska Legislature. Their son William M. Wylie also served in the Nebraska Legislature. On July 3, 1964, Frank B. Morrison Governor of Nebraska appointed Wylie to the Nebraska Legislature after her husband died on May 18, 1964. Wylie served until January 6, 1965 when her son succeeded her.
