= Henry B. Heller =

American politician (1941–2021)

Henry B. "Hank" Heller
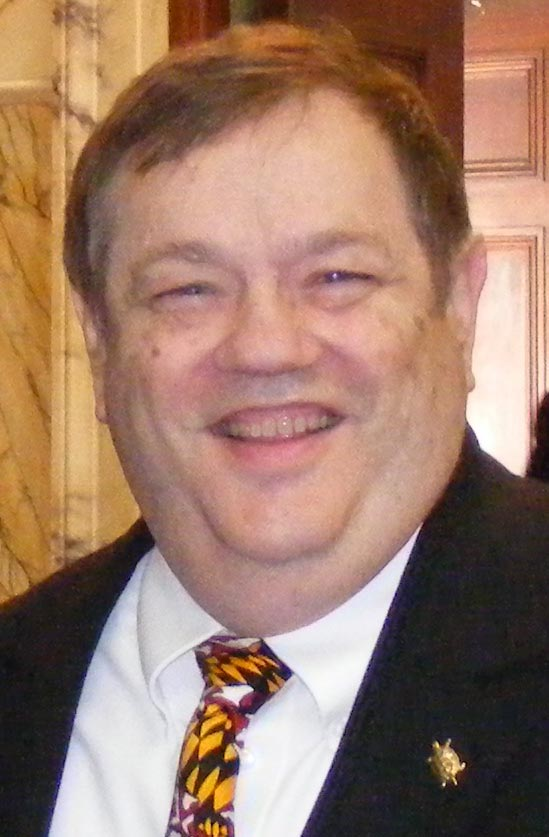

Member of the Maryland House of Delegates from the 19th district
- In office January 14, 1987 – January 12, 2011
- Preceded by: Multi-member district
- Succeeded by: Multi-member district

Personal details
- Born: August 14, 1941 Washington, D.C., U.S.
- Died: February 17, 2021 (aged 79) Sandy Spring, Maryland
- Party: Democratic
- Spouse: Bonnie Heller
- Children: Hank and David

Henry B. "Hank" Heller (August 14, 1941 – February 17, 2021) was an American politician from the state of Maryland. A Democrat, he represented District 19 in central Montgomery County in the Maryland House of Delegates from 1987 until 2011.

== Background ==
Heller attended Walter Johnson High School in Montgomery County and received a B.A. from Frostburg State University and both an M.A. and Ed.D. from the Virginia Polytechnic Institute. He worked for the Montgomery County Public Schools in a number of capacities, and was a past president of the Montgomery County Education Association.

=== Legislative notes ===
- Voted against slots in 2005 (HB1361)
- Voted in favor of increasing the sales tax by 20% - Tax Reform Act of 2007(HB2)
- Voted in favor of in-state tuition for illegal immigrants in 2007 (HB6)
- Voted to ban first-cousin marriage in Maryland in 2000

Heller died on February 17, 2021, in Sandy Spring, Maryland at age 79.
