= Roger Manno =

American politician

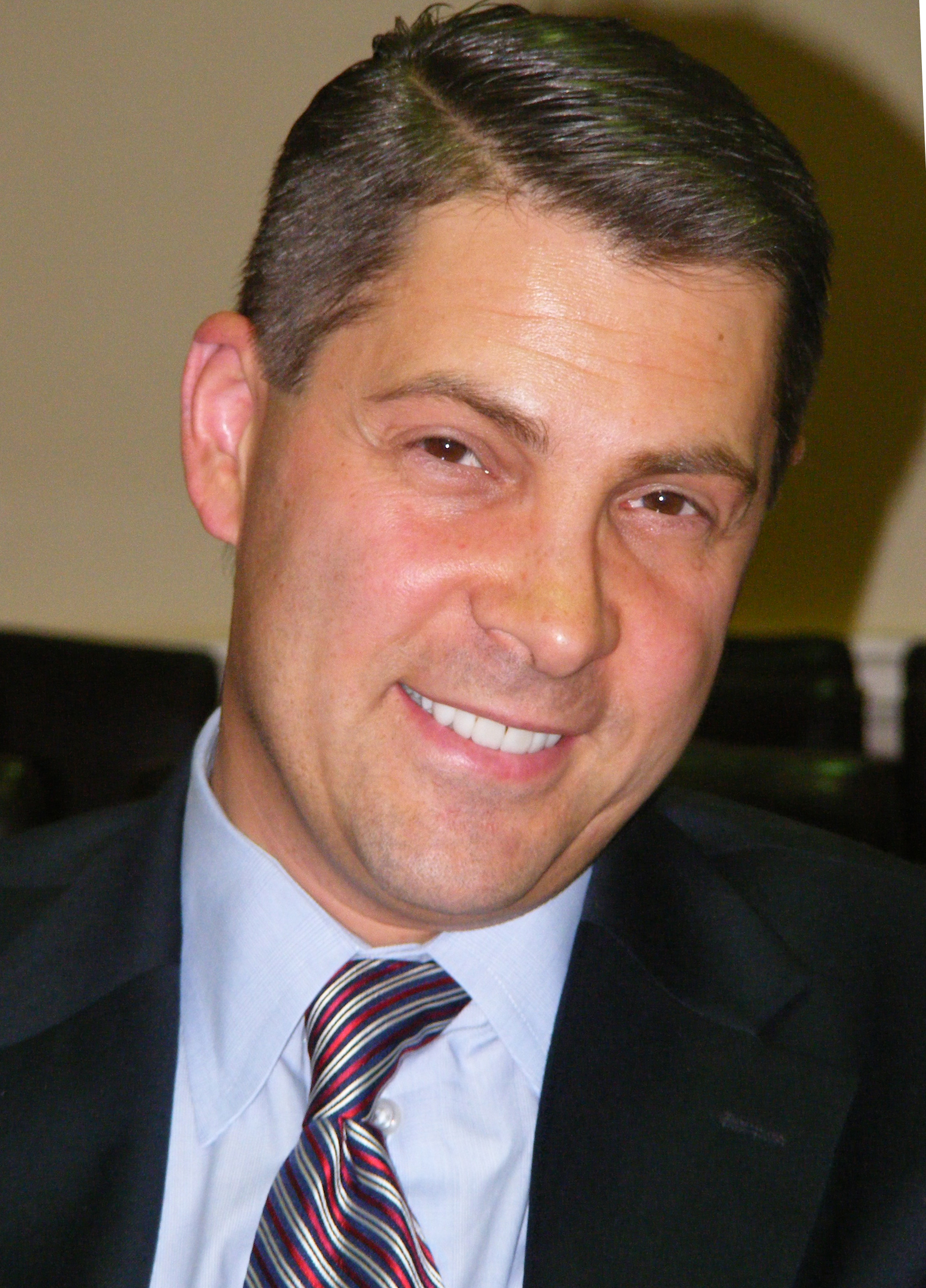

Member of the Maryland Senate from the 19th district
- In office January 12, 2011 – January 9, 2019
- Preceded by: Mike Lenett
- Succeeded by: Benjamin F. Kramer

Member of the Maryland House of Delegates from the 19th district
- In office 2007–2011
- Preceded by: Adrienne A. Mandel
- Succeeded by: Sam Arora

Personal details
- Born: Roger P. Manno; April 26, 1966 (age 60)
- Party: Democratic
- Spouse: Marjorie Anne Miller Manno
- Education: Hunter College (BA); University of New Hampshire (JD)

Roger P. Manno (born April 26, 1966) is an American politician. He was elected to the Maryland House of Delegates in 2006 to represent the 19th Legislative District, and in 2010 was elected to the Maryland State Senate.

== Background ==
Roger P. Manno was born to John Manno, a sculptor and carpenter, and Beatrice Ila Scheinbaum, a student. The family moved from California to New York City in 1971. When Manno was 6 years old, his father became ill, but he was turned away at the hospital because he had no health insurance. His father died of heart failure. Manno was raised by his mother and his stepfather, John Pettinato, a social worker and teacher. Manno has one sister, Shana.

=== Education ===
Manno attended high schools in New York. He earned a bachelor's degree from Hunter College. Manno earned his Juris Doctor and Masters in Intellectual Property Law from the Franklin Pierce Law Center. During law school, he served as a legal extern for Congressman Jerry Nadler (Ranking Member of the Judiciary Subcommittee on the Constitution), and worked for the New Hampshire Attorney General. Manno graduated magna cum laude from Hunter College. During College, Manno served as a member of the Hunter Senate, in addition to receiving a White House internship, and interning in the New York State Supreme Court and the New York State Senate. Manno also worked in public schools as a para-educator with special-needs students.

== Career ==
After graduating law school, Manno served as senior counsel to Congresswoman Sheila Jackson-Lee of the House Judiciary Committee. Subsequently, Manno served as Legislative Director to Congressman Sanford Bishop of the House Appropriations Committee and the United States House Permanent Select Committee on Intelligence. In 2004, Montgomery County Executive Douglas M. Duncan appointed Manno to the Montgomery County Criminal Justice Coordinating Commission.

In 2006, Roger Manno announced his candidacy for the House of Delegates. During his campaign, he focused on education, access to affordable health care, and transportation. Manno supported the building of the Intercounty Connector, but he said that the highway proposal included too many highway interchanges. Manno won the election.

In 2010, Manno was elected to the Maryland Senate, defeating incumbent Mike Lenett (D) of Silver Spring in the Democratic primary by 54%–46% before defeating Don Irvine (R) of Gaithersburg in the general election by 68.03%–31.76%.

In 2009, Manno was appointed to serve on the White House Task Force of State Legislators for Health Reform.

Manno is not employed outside of the Maryland Senate.

=== In the legislature ===
Manno was sworn into the House of Delegates on January 10, 2007. He was a member of the Economic Matters Committee and its business regulation, property & casualty insurance, consumer protection & commercial law subcommittees. He served as Vice-Chair of the County Affairs Committee, Montgomery County Delegation and was a member of the Maryland BioTech, the Maryland Educator and the Maryland Veterans Caucuses.

In 2010, Manno was listed as having the highest lifetime environmental rating by the League of Conservation Voters and Environment Maryland, and was named to the Maryland Consumer Rights Coalition's Consumer Rights Hall of Fame.

Manno was sworn into the Maryland Senate on January 12, 2011. He has been appointed to serve on the Senate Budget and Taxation Committee.

In 2006, Manno listed Health care, Education, Transportation and Public Safety as his priorities. Manno has worked closely with local activists and residents to ameliorate disruption and environmental damage caused by the ICC.

== Positions ==
Manno is in favor of a single-payer universal health care system where all individuals have health insurance paid with taxes. He supports the United States National Health Care Act.

Manno supports reducing the cost of college through student loan forgiveness after serving with AmeriCorps or the Peace Corps and by increasing Pell Grants.

Manno wants to increase use of renewable energy sources, such as windmill farms, solar panels, and hydrokinetic turbines, in order to reduce the use of fossil fuels to generate energy.

At a 2018 candidate forum for congressional candidates, Manno stated that the issue of the Israel settlements was an economic one and advocated for "popping in a Peugeot plant or General Motors plant".
