= Elgin, Nebraska =

City in Antelope County, Nebraska, United States

- City
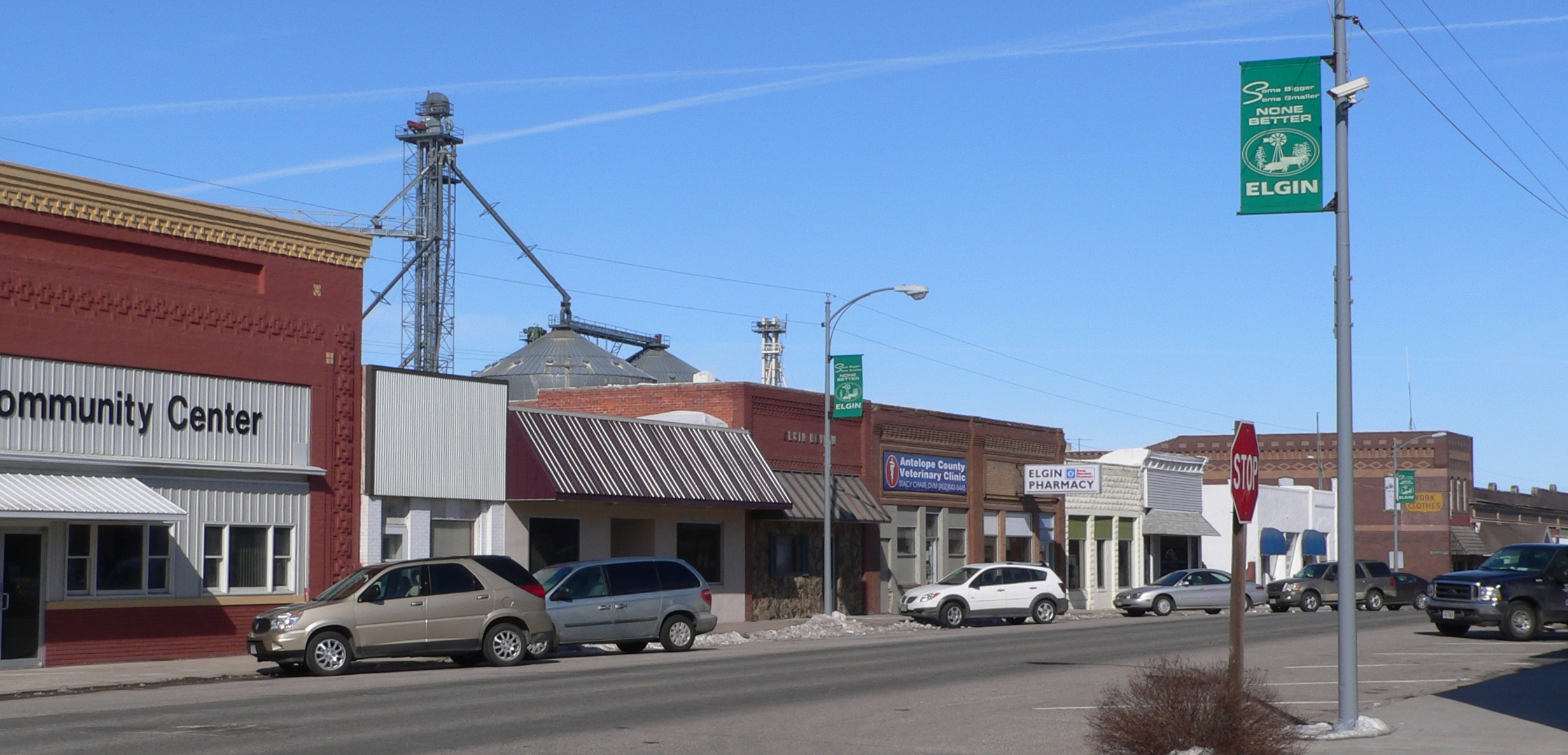
- Downtown Elgin: west side of 2nd Street, looking north from Cedar Street

- Location of Elgin, Nebraska
- Coordinates: 41°58′59″N 98°04′58″W
- Country: United States
- State: Nebraska
- County: Antelope

Area
  - Total: 0.73 sq mi (1.89 km^{2})
  - Land: 0.73 sq mi (1.89 km^{2})
  - Water: 0 sq mi (0.00 km^{2})
- Elevation: 1,929 ft (588 m)

Population (2020)
  - Total: 717
  - Density: 984/sq mi (380.1/km^{2})
- Time zone: UTC-6 (Central (CST))
  - Summer (DST): UTC-5 (CDT)
- ZIP code: 68636
- Area code: 402
- FIPS code: 31-14730
- GNIS feature ID: 2394645
- Website: Town of Elgin

Elgin is a city in Antelope County, Nebraska, United States. As of the 2020 census, Elgin had a population of 717.

== History ==
Elgin was platted in 1887 when the railroad was extended to that point. Its name was chosen at random from a postal directory, after the city of Elgin, Illinois.

== Demographics ==
Historical population
Census	Pop.	Note	%±
1900	451		—
1910	606		34.4%
1920	854		40.9%
1930	917		7.4%
1940	853		−7.0%
1950	820		−3.9%
1960	881		7.4%
1970	917		4.1%
1980	807		−12.0%
1990	731		−9.4%
2000	735		0.5%
2010	661		−10.1%
2020	717		8.5%
U.S. Decennial Census

=== 2010 census ===
As of the census of 2010, there were 661 people, 307 households, and 194 families living in the city. The population density was 931.0 inhabitants per square mile (359.5/km^{2}). There were 364 housing units at an average density of 512.7 units per square mile (198.0 units/km^{2}). The racial makeup of the city was 98.5% White, 0.8% from other races, and 0.8% from two or more races. Hispanic or Latino of any race were 0.9% of the population.

There were 307 households, of which 21.8% had children under the age of 18 living with them, 53.7% were married couples living together, 6.2% had a female householder with no husband present, 3.3% had a male householder with no wife present, and 36.8% were non-families. 35.2% of all households were made up of individuals, and 23.4% had someone living alone who was 65 years of age or older. The average household size was 2.15 and the average family size was 2.75.

The median age in the city was 49.8 years. 21% of residents were under the age of 18; 5% were between the ages of 18 and 24; 16.7% were from 25 to 44; 26.3% were from 45 to 64; and 31% were 65 years of age or older. The gender makeup of the city was 46.7% male and 53.3% female.

=== 2000 census ===
As of the census of 2000, there were 735 people, 333 households, and 208 families living in the city. The population density was 1,025.1 inhabitants per square mile (395.8/km^{2}). There were 372 housing units at an average density of 518.8 units per square mile (200.3 units/km^{2}). The racial makeup of the city was 99.59% White, and 0.41% from two or more races.

There were 333 households, out of which 26.1% had children under the age of 18 living with them, 55.3% were married couples living together, 5.1% had a female householder with no husband present, and 37.5% were non-families. 35.7% of all households were made up of individuals, and 24.3% had someone living alone who was 65 years of age or older. The average household size was 2.20 and the average family size was 2.88.

In the city, the population was spread out, with 23.9% under the age of 18, 5.0% from 18 to 24, 20.7% from 25 to 44, 21.2% from 45 to 64, and 29.1% who were 65 years of age or older. The median age was 45 years. For every 100 females, there were 90.9 males. For every 100 females age 18 and over, there were 87.6 males.

As of 2000 the median income for a household in the city was $29,833, and the median income for a family was $38,250. Males had a median income of $26,827 versus $17,361 for females. The per capita income for the city was $15,724. About 3.4% of families and 5.5% of the population were below the poverty line, including none of those under age 18 and 11.3% of those age 65 or over.

== Geography ==
According to the United States Census Bureau, the city has a total area of 0.71 square miles (1.84 km^{2}), all land.

=== Climate ===
Climate data for Elgin, Nebraska (1991–2020 normals, extremes 1989–present)
Month	Jan	Feb	Mar	Apr	May	Jun	Jul	Aug	Sep	Oct	Nov	Dec	Year
Record high °F (°C)	72 (22)	77 (25)	89 (32)	92 (33)	98 (37)	107 (42)	101 (38)	104 (40)	99 (37)	96 (36)	84 (29)	68 (20)	107 (42)
Mean daily maximum °F (°C)	32.0 (0.0)	36.0 (2.2)	47.6 (8.7)	59.2 (15.1)	69.9 (21.1)	79.7 (26.5)	83.7 (28.7)	81.5 (27.5)	75.2 (24.0)	62.7 (17.1)	47.5 (8.6)	34.8 (1.6)	59.2 (15.1)
Daily mean °F (°C)	22.2 (−5.4)	25.7 (−3.5)	36.2 (2.3)	47.3 (8.5)	58.9 (14.9)	69.3 (20.7)	73.5 (23.1)	71.1 (21.7)	63.3 (17.4)	50.4 (10.2)	36.6 (2.6)	25.5 (−3.6)	48.3 (9.1)
Mean daily minimum °F (°C)	12.4 (−10.9)	15.3 (−9.3)	24.7 (−4.1)	35.4 (1.9)	47.9 (8.8)	58.9 (14.9)	63.2 (17.3)	60.7 (15.9)	51.4 (10.8)	38.0 (3.3)	25.8 (−3.4)	16.2 (−8.8)	37.5 (3.1)
Record low °F (°C)	−23 (−31)	−33 (−36)	−14 (−26)	7 (−14)	26 (−3)	39 (4)	43 (6)	40 (4)	26 (−3)	9 (−13)	−7 (−22)	−30 (−34)	−33 (−36)
Average precipitation inches (mm)	0.56 (14)	0.82 (21)	1.48 (38)	2.79 (71)	3.97 (101)	4.00 (102)	3.10 (79)	4.42 (112)	2.33 (59)	2.44 (62)	1.14 (29)	0.86 (22)	27.91 (709)
Average snowfall inches (cm)	6.2 (16)	6.3 (16)	4.4 (11)	2.7 (6.9)	0.2 (0.51)	0.0 (0.0)	0.0 (0.0)	0.0 (0.0)	0.0 (0.0)	0.6 (1.5)	4.1 (10)	6.3 (16)	31.2 (79)
Average precipitation days (≥ 0.01 in)	5.0	6.0	7.0	9.0	11.0	10.0	9.0	9.0	7.0	7.0	5.0	5.0	88.0
Average snowy days (≥ 0.1 in)	4.0	4.0	3.0	1.0	0.0	0.0	0.0	0.0	0.0	0.3	2.0	4.0	18.0
Source: NOAA

== Media ==
A weekly newspaper, The Elgin Review, is published in Elgin.

== Education ==
Elgin High School, Pope John High School, and St. Boniface Elementary School are located in the city.

== See also ==
- List of municipalities in Nebraska
