= Mattes =

Mattes is a surname. Notable people with the surname include:

- Andy W. Mattes (born c. 1963), German businessman
- Daniel Mattes (born 1972), Austrian internet entrepreneur
- Eva Mattes (born 1954), Austro-German actress
- Eva and Franco Mattes (born 1976), Italian artists
- John Mattes, American investigative journalist
- John Mattes (politician) (fl. 1856–1918), American politician
- Mattes Hansen (born 2004), German footballer
- Richard Mattes, American nutrition scientist
- Ron Mattes (born 1968), American football player
- R.J. Mattes (born 1990), American football player
- Tracy Mattes (born 1969), American track and field athlete
- Troy Mattes (born 1975), American baseball player

== See also ==
- Minnie Y. and Frank P. Mattes House, historic building in Iowa, United States
