= Chronister =

Chronister is a surname. Notable people with the surname include:

- Chad Chronister (born 1964), American law enforcement officer
- Earl J. Chronister Jr. (1924–2009), American sport shooter
- Harry Chronister (1922–2006), American politician from Nebraska
- Kay Chronister, American gothic writer
- Rochelle Chronister (1939–2023), American politician from Kansas

== See also ==
- Chronister, Texas
