= Senator Bowen (disambiguation) =

Thomas M. Bowen (1835–1906) was a U.S. Senator from Colorado. Senator Bowen may also refer to:

- Bill Bowen (1929–1999), Ohio State Senate
- Debra Bowen (born 1955), California State Senate
- Ezra A. Bowen (fl. 1850s), Wisconsin State Senate
- George Bowen (New York politician) (1831–1921), New York State Senate
- John Clyde Bowen (1888–1978), Washington State Senate
- John W. Bowen (1926–2011), Ohio State Senate
- Joseph R. Bowen (born 1950), Kentucky State Senate
- Kenneth Bowen (Nebraska politician) (1912–1981), Nebraska State Senate
- Rooney L. Bowen (1933–2016), Georgia State Senate
- Shepard P. Bowen (1824–1908), New York State Senate
- Thomas Bowen (Wisconsin politician) (1808–1883), Wisconsin State Senate
- William H. Bower (1850–1910), North Carolina State Senate
