= Wells High School (Texas) =

Location
- 160 Rusk Street; Wells, Texas 75976; United States; 31.488181°N 94.938279°W

Information
- Type: Public high school
- School district: Wells Independent School District
- Superintendent: James Moore
- Principal: Gary Applewhite
- Teaching staff: 23.98 (FTE)
- Grades: 7-12
- Enrollment: 242 (2023–2024)
- Student to teacher ratio: 10.09
- Color
- Athletics conference: UIL Class 1A
- Team name: Pirates
- Website: Official website

Wells High School is a public high school located in Wells, Texas (USA). It is the sole high school in the Wells Independent School District and is classified as a 1A school by the UIL. For the 2021-2022 school year, the school was given a "B" by the Texas Education Agency.

== Athletics ==
The Wells Pirates compete in the following sports:

- Baseball
- Basketball
- Cross Country
- Golf
- Softball
- Tennis
- Track and Field
