= Isaac S. Hascall =

American politician

Acting Governor of Nebraska (Disputed)
- In office February 8, 1872 – February 13, 1872
- Preceded by: William H. James
- Succeeded by: William H. James

5th President of the Nebraska Senate
- In office 1871–1872
- Preceded by: Ebenezer E. Cunningham
- Succeeded by: William A. Gwyer

Member of the Nebraska State Senate
- In office 1867–1869
- In office 1871–1873

Personal details
- Born: March 8, 1831 Erie County, New York, U.S.
- Died: January 18, 1908 (aged 76) Omaha, Nebraska, U.S.
- Spouse: Sarah J. Harrison (m. 1856; div. 1886)
- Children: 2

Isaac Skinner Hascall (March 8, 1831 – January 18, 1908) was a lawyer who served in the Nebraska State Senate from 1867 to 1869 and again from 1871 to 1873, serving as President of the Senate from 1871 to 1873. Hascall is known for declaring himself Acting Governor of Nebraska in February 1872 by virtue of his position as President of the Senate in order to call a special session of the Nebraska Legislature while current Acting Governor William H. James was traveling out of the state.

== Early life ==
Hascall was born in Erie County, New York, in 1831. His grandfather was a Baptist preacher, and his father, Jonathan Hascall, was a lawyer and a presidential elector for the state of New York in the election of 1844. Hascall read law in Mayville, New York, and was admitted to practice law in New York in 1853. During the time after 1855, Hascall journeyed to the states of Missouri, Kansas, and Nebraska and engaged in an expedition with a surveying crew to determine township lines near Nebraska City, Nebraska; he also practiced law at Atchison, Kansas.

== Career ==
While practicing law in Atchison, Kansas, Hascall was elected as a member of the Constitutional Convention of Kansas and also served as a probate judge there. He quit practicing law in Atchison in 1860 and moved to Colorado and soon after to Oregon with a prospecting party and settled in the mining town of Auburn, Oregon. He began practicing law there and was elected as the city attorney. In 1863, Hascall continued prospecting in the mountains of Idaho. From 1863 to 1865, Hascall traveled through California, Nevada (he was admitted to the Nevada bar in 1864), New York, Kentucky, Illinois, Michigan, Canada, and Pennsylvania; he finally settled in Omaha, Nebraska, in March 1865. He set up a law practice in Omaha in 1865 at 15th and Farnam Streets, and in the summer of 1865, he was appointed as Probate Judge of Douglas County, Nebraska, and was later elected to the position in his own right.

In 1866, Hascall was elected to the Nebraska State Senate from Douglas County and served in the second session, which was a special session called by Governor David Butler meeting on February 20 and 21 of 1867 to consider the question of a black suffrage amendment to the Nebraska Constitution of 1866. Congress had rejected the proposed Nebraska Constitution of 1866 and Nebraska's application for statehood until Nebraska agreed to an amendment allowing black people to vote. When the special session convened to consider the black suffrage amendment, Hascall became the deciding vote in favor of black suffrage, allowing the amendment to pass and thus hastening Nebraska's statehood which came into force on March 1, 1867.

Hascall resigned his position as Probate Judge in August 1867 in order to travel West to Cheyenne, Wyoming. He returned to Omaha in 1868 and was again elected to the Nebraska State Senate for Douglas County in 1870. In the Spring of 1871, he was elected as a delegate from Douglas County to the Nebraska Constitutional Convention of 1871. The constitution produced by this convention was ultimately rejected by the voters of Nebraska on September 17, 1871. After the resignation of Ebenezer E. Cunningham as President of the Nebraska State Senate in late 1871, which occurred after the impeachment and removal of Governor David Butler, Hascall was elected as the new President of the Nebraska State Senate.

On February 8, 1872, while Nebraska Secretary of State and Acting Governor William H. James was away on business in Washington, D.C., Hascall declared himself the "Acting Governor" of the State of Nebraska during James's absence by virtue of his position as President of the Nebraska State Senate. Hascall made this declaration based on Section 17 of Article III of the Nebraska Constitution of 1866, which read, "If, during the vacancy of the office of Governor, the Secretary of State shall be impeached, displaced, resign, die, or be absent from the State, the powers and duties of the office of Governor shall devolve upon the President of the Senate." By declaring himself Acting Governor, Hascall then claimed the power to call a special session of the Nebraska Legislature to enact various legislation, including by implication the consideration of impeachment of Acting Governor James, who was absent from the state. It is said that Hascall was able to affix the Great Seal of the State of Nebraska to his proclamation calling for a special legislative session by telling Acting Governor James's private secretary that he needed the seal to certify the appointment of a notary public. When word of this reached Acting Governor James in Washington, he immediately began the trip back to Nebraska. When he arrived back in Nebraska on February 13, 1872, Acting Governor James issued his own proclamation revoking the one put out by Hascall.

Despite Acting Governor James's revocation, preparations for the special session, which was to be called for February 15, 1872, were already being made, and thus several senators and representatives met and recognized the legality of Hascall's actions as "Acting Governor." However, there were not enough present for a quorum, and so the sergeant-at-arms was instructed to compel the attendance of absent members. One senator permitted himself to be arrested in order to produce a test case that could come before the Supreme Court of Nebraska to settle the issue. On February 22, 1872, the Supreme Court of Nebraska rendered its decision on the legality of the special session. The Court ruled that Hascall was legally authorized to be the Acting Governor of Nebraska in the absence of Acting Governor James under Section 17 of Article III of the Nebraska Constitution of 1866. However, the Court also ruled that the calling of the special session was not legal under Section 9 of Article III of the Constitution of 1866 because there was no "extraordinary occasion" necessary to call a special session. Based on this decision, the grounds justifying a special session ceased to exist, and the attempt was abandoned by Hascall and others. This case was cited 102 years later in 1974 when a similar attempt was made by Speaker of the Nebraska Legislature Richard Proud to call a special session while the governor and lieutenant governor were absent from the state.

After leaving the Nebraska State Senate in 1873, Hascall mostly focused his time on local politics in the city of Omaha. He served on the Omaha City Council for a time and also tried starting some hotels in Omaha which eventually failed. He owned a 10-acre property at 13th and Vinton Streets in Omaha, Nebraska, and he built a limestone wall around the property to keep the city from extending 14th Street through the property. Some of that wall remains to this day.

== Party affiliation ==
Hascall's party affiliation is unclear and may have changed over time. One source implies that Hascall was a member of the Democratic Party, another source identifies Hascall as an Independent, and a newspaper article and an obituary say that Hascall was a Republican.

== Personal life ==
Hascall married Sarah J. Harrison in July 1856 in Chautauqua County, New York. They had two children, a daughter and a son, but were divorced in 1886 for reason of Hascall's alleged extramarital affairs and abuse of his wife. He was an active mason and member of the Capitol Lodge in Omaha. He died in Omaha, Nebraska, on January 18, 1908.
