= Senator Koch =

Senator Koch may refer to:

- Amy Koch (born 1971), Minnesota State Senate
- Eric Koch (politician) (fl. 2000s–2010s), Indiana State Senate
- Jerry Koch (Nebraska politician) (1924–2007), Nebraska State Senate
