= Bob Dickey =

American politician

Member of the Nebraska Legislature from the 18th district
- In office April 27, 1999 – January 3, 2001
- Preceded by: Stan Schellpeper
- Succeeded by: Doug Cunningham

Personal details
- Born: September 5, 1939 (age 86) Ponca, Nebraska
- Party: Republican
- Spouse: Mary Fellwock (m. 1965)
- Children: 3 (Julie, Jim, June)
- Education: University of Nebraska
- Occupation: Farmer

Military service
- Allegiance: United States
- Branch/service: United States Army
- Years of service: 1961–1962

Robert L. "Bob" Dickey (born September 5, 1939) is a Republican politician from Nebraska who served as a member of the Nebraska Legislature from the 18th district from 1999 to 2001.

== Early life ==
Dickey was born in 1939 in Ponca, Nebraska, and graduated from Laurel High School in 1958. He later attended the University of Nebraska, receiving a certificate in general agriculture in 1960, and then served in the U.S. Army from 1961 to 1962. Dickey was a farmer, and was involved in agricultural policymaking, serving on the state Corn Board and Governor Mike Johanns's Advisory Cabinet on Agriculture.

== Nebraska Legislature ==
On April 4, 1999, State Senator Stan Schellpeper, who represented the 18th district, died in office. Governor Mike Johanns appointed Dickey to serve until a 2000 special election, and he was sworn in on April 27, 1999.

On December 21, 2000, Dickey mailed copies of a book titled Abandonment Theology — the Clergy and the Decline of American Christianity — an Action Guide to Save America to other members of the legislature. The book argued that homosexuality was immoral and that God opposed women serving in combat roles. Doug Kristensen, the Speaker of the Legislature, noted that while he would "feel uncomfortable" about distributing the book himself, Dickey was allowed do so.

Dickey ran in the special election to serve out the remaining two years of Schellpeper's term, and was challenged by grocer Doug Cunningham and lawyer Chuck Meyer. In the primary election, Cunningham placed first, winning 47 percent of the vote to Dickey's 41 percent. They advanced to the general election, where Cunningham won by a wide margin, defeating Dickey, 57-43 percent.

== Post-legislative career ==
Following Dickey's departure from the legislature in 2001, he served on the Nebraska Corn Board and as the president and chairman of the National Corn Growers Association.
