= Richard Proud =

American politician

Richard F. Proud

20th Speaker of the Nebraska Legislature
- In office January 2, 1973 – January 8, 1975
- Preceded by: William Hasebroock
- Succeeded by: Jules Burbach

Member of the Nebraska Legislature from the 12th district
- In office January 5, 1965 – January 8, 1975
- Preceded by: William Hasebroock (redistricted)
- Succeeded by: Jerry Koch

Personal details
- Born: Richard French Proud; January 19, 1922 Des Moines, Iowa, U.S.
- Died: January 24, 2009 (aged 87) Rifle, Colorado, U.S.
- Party: Republican
- Education: University of Nebraska (BA); University of Colorado (LLB)
- Occupation: Lawyer; politician

Military service
- Branch/service: United States Navy
- Battles/wars: World War II; Pacific theater

Richard French Proud (January 19, 1922 – January 24, 2009) was an American politician who served in the Nebraska Legislature from 1965 to 1975.

== Early life ==
Richard Proud was born in Des Moines, Iowa, on January 19, 1922. He moved to Arapahoe, Nebraska, where he graduated from high school. Proud graduated from the University of Nebraska before earning a degree from the University of Colorado Law School. He was a second lieutenant with the United States Navy and commanded a landing craft in the Pacific Theater of World War II.

== Career ==
After the war, Proud became a lawyer and lobbyist for Mutual of Omaha, where he worked for two decades. He was first elected to the Nebraska Legislature in November 1964, and continually reelected from Omaha in district 12 until choosing not to run during the 1974 election cycle. From 1973 to 1974, Proud was speaker of the state legislature. From 1972 to 1973, Proud led an effort to rescind Nebraska's ratification of the proposed Equal Rights Amendment, after legislative colleague Fern Hubbard Orme had backed the amendment's ratification.

Under the Nebraska Constitution, when both the governor and lieutenant governor are absent from the state, the powers and duties of the office of governor devolve on the speaker of the Nebraska Legislature. On September 24, 1974, both Nebraska Governor J. James Exon and Nebraska Lieutenant Governor Frank Marsh were traveling outside the state, and thus the powers of the governor devolved on Proud as he was the current speaker of the Nebraska Legislature. While acting as governor, Proud decided to call a special session of the Nebraska Legislature to meet on October 7 and discuss Nebraska's nine-percent usury limit. When Governor Exon, who was traveling in South Dakota, heard about Proud's actions, he said he would rescind the order and called Proud's actions a "publicity stunt" and "one of the most irresponsible acts I've ever seen." When Exon arrived back in Nebraska later that evening, he signed a proclamation canceling Proud's call for a special session. Although Proud was rightfully the acting governor, Nebraska Attorney General Clarence Meyer ruled that Proud did not have authority to call a special session, basing his decision on an 1872 Nebraska Supreme Court decision which argued that the Nebraska Constitution did not intend for acting governors to have all powers of the governor. This decision was the result of a similar attempt by Isaac S. Hascall in 1872, then president of the Nebraska Senate, who tried to call a session of the legislature while the acting governor was absent from the state.

In the 1976 United States Senate election in Nebraska, Proud lost the Republican Party primary to John Y. McCollister. After stepping down from the state legislature, Proud served the Nebraska Department of Welfare as deputy director and general counsel, as well as an assistant professor at the University of Nebraska–Lincoln. In retirement, Proud moved to Battlement Mesa, Colorado. He died in Rifle, Colorado, on January 24, 2009. A memorial was held in Battlement Mesa and Arapahoe, and Proud was interred in Arapahoe.

Nebraska Legislature
Preceded by William Hasebroock	Member of the Nebraska Legislature from the 12th district 1965–1975	Succeeded by Jerry Koch
Political offices
Preceded by William Hasebroock	Speaker of the Nebraska Legislature; 1973–1975	Succeeded by Jules Burbach
