= Perry A. C. Reed =

American politician

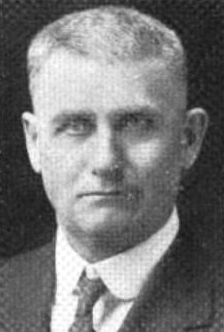

34th President pro tempore of the Nebraska Senate
- In office January 1927 – January 1929
- Preceded by: John W. Robbins
- Succeeded by: John W. Cooper

Member of the Nebraska State Senate
- In office 1919–1933

Member of the Nebraska House of Representatives
- In office 1917–1918

Personal details
- Born: Perry Alvin Charles Reed; January 22, 1871 Monroe, Wisconsin
- Died: April 4, 1943 (aged 72) Springfield, Missouri
- Party: Republican
- Spouse: Abbie L. Westcott (m. 1896)
- Occupation: Farmer, politician

Perry Alvin Charles Reed (January 22, 1871 – April 4, 1943) was a politician in the State of Nebraska.

== Biography ==
Reed was born on January 22, 1871, to John P. and Emma J. Reed in or near Monroe, Wisconsin. They moved to Nebraska in 1875. On March 11, 1896, he married Abbie L. Westcott. He was a farmer by trade and a member of the Odd Fellows. He died of pneumonia in 1943.

== Political career ==
Reed served in the Nebraska State Senate from 1919 to 1933. Prior to that, he had served in the Nebraska State House of Representatives. He was a Republican.
