= Senator Lathrop =

Senator Lathrop may refer to:

- Samuel Lathrop (1772–1846), Massachusetts State Senate
- Steve Lathrop (born 1957), Nebraska State Senate
