= Alexander H. Conner =

American politician

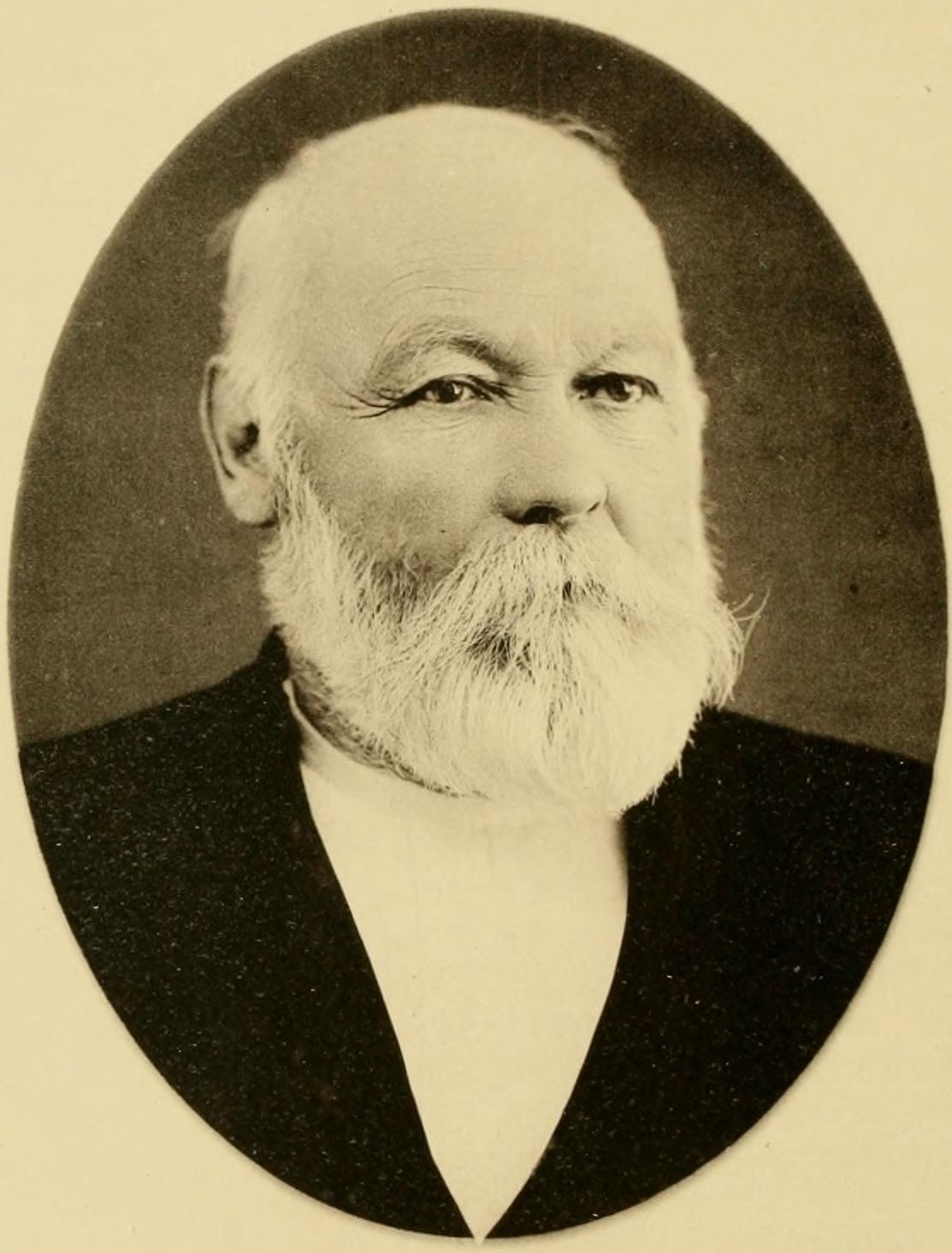
- From 1890's Biographical Souvenir of the Counties of Buffalo, Kearney, Phelps, Harlan, and Franklin, Nebraska

12th President pro tempore of the Nebraska Senate
- In office January 1883 – January 1885
- Preceded by: John B. Dinsmore
- Succeeded by: Church Howe

Personal details
- Born: August 5, 1831 Hamilton County, Indiana
- Died: May 29, 1891 (aged 59) Kearney, Nebraska
- Occupation: Lawyer, politician

Alexander Hamilton Conner (August 5, 1831 – May 29, 1891) was an American politician and legislator.

Born in Hamilton County, Indiana, Conner was the son of William Conner, a pioneer and politician. He was admitted to the Indiana bar in 1855. He served in the Indiana House of Representatives in 1856. In 1860, Conner took part in the Republican Convention that nominated Abraham Lincoln. Conner was a newspaper publisher and was appointed postmaster for Indianapolis, Indiana. In 1871, President Ulysses S. Grant appointed Conner Governor of Idaho Territory, but he declined the office. After dealing with financial problems with his newspaper in Indianapolis, Conner moved to Kearney, Nebraska, in 1872, where he practiced law. Conner served in the Nebraska Constitutional Convention of 1875 and was elected to the Nebraska State Senate serving in 1883–1885 and 1889–1891. Conner died in Kearney, Nebraska.
