= Wildhurst, Texas =

Ghost town in East Texas

Coordinates: 31°31′22″N 95°01′07″W

Wildhurst is a ghost town located in Cherokee County, Texas, United States. The town is located north of Forest.

== History ==
Wildhurst was established as a logging community, with Milton A. Smith moving his logging operations to the area from Chronister c1900.
