= Chris Abboud =

American politician

Member of the Nebraska Legislature from the 12th district
- In office January 5, 1983 – November 16, 1998
- Preceded by: Jerry Koch
- Succeeded by: Pam Redfield

Personal details
- Born: August 29, 1956 (age 69) Omaha, Nebraska
- Party: Republican
- Education: Creighton University (B.A.); University of Nebraska College of Law (J.D.)
- Occupation: Attorney

Chris Abboud (born August 29, 1956) is a Republican politician from Nebraska and attorney who served as a member of the Nebraska Legislature from the 12th district from 1983 to 1998.

== Early life ==
Abboud was born in Omaha, Nebraska, in 1956, and grew up in Ralston. He attended Seymour Elementary School, Ralston Middle School, and Creighton Preparatory School. Abboud's father, Fred Abboud, was a member of the Ralston City Council from 1962 to 1966, and his mother, Bonnie Abboud, ran for mayor in 1980.

== Nebraska Legislature ==
In 1982, while Abboud was in his third year of law school, he ran for the Nebraska Legislature in the 12th district against incumbent State Senator Jerry Koch. In the nonpartisan primary, he placed second, winning 38 percent of the vote to Koch's 46 percent, hospital administrator John Hurley's 9 percent, and perennial candidate Donald James Jensen's 7 percent. He and Koch advanced to the general election, where Abboud narrowly defeated Koch, 52–48 percent.

During his first term in the legislature, Abboud started a law firm with his younger brother, Greg, and contemplated not seeking re-election to focus on his legal practice. However, he ultimately decided to do so, citing his desire to "continue to be one of the leading fiscal conservatives" in the legislature. Koch, who was elected mayor of Ralston after losing to Abboud in 1982, challenged him for re-election, as did technology analyst Gene Gerdes and machinist Ronald Hug. In the primary election, Abboud placed first over Koch, winning 53 percent of the vote to Koch's 33 percent, Gerdes's 8 percent, and Hug's 6 percent. In the general election, Abboud defeated Koch by a wide margin, receiving 62 percent of the vote to his 38 percent.

In 1990, Abboud ran for re-election to a third term, and was challenged by Gary Stroh, the former superintendent of Millard Public Schools, and contractor Gary Thompson. Abboud narrowly placed first in the primary election, winning 47.4 percent of the vote to Stroh's 46.8 percent, and they advanced to the general election. In the general election, Abboud defeated Stroh by a thin margin, receiving 51 percent of the vote to Stroh's 49 percent.

Abboud ran for re-election in 1994 and won re-election without opposition. He declined to seek a fifth term in 1998, citing his desire to spend time with his family. He was succeeded by Pam Redfield, and resigned from office on November 16, 1998, so that Redfield would have a "head start and a month and a half seniority."
