= Stan Schellpeper =

American politician (1934–1999)

Member of the Nebraska Legislature from the 18th district
- In office January 7, 1987 – April 4, 1999
- Preceded by: Harry Chronister
- Succeeded by: Bob Dickey

Personal details
- Born: January 27, 1934 Hoskins, Nebraska
- Died: April 4, 1999 (aged 65) Norfolk, Nebraska
- Party: Democratic
- Spouse: Faye Wiedeman (m. 1957)
- Children: 3 (Jeffrey, Thomas, Nancy)
- Occupation: Farmer, livestock feeder

Stan Schellpeper (January 27, 1934 – April 4, 1999) was a Democratic politician from Nebraska who served as a member of the Nebraska Legislature from the 18th district from 1987 until his death in 1999.

== Early life ==
Schellpeper was born in Hoskins, Nebraska, in 1934, and graduated from Stanton High School. He worked as a farmer and livestock feeder, and served on the Stanton County Fair Board, as well as the Nebraska State Fair Board.

== Nebraska Legislature ==
In 1986, State Senator Harry Chronister declined to seek re-election, and Schellpeper ran to succeed him in the 18th district, which included Colfax, Cuming, Dodge, and Stanton counties. In the nonpartisan primary, Schellpeper ran against insurance salesman Roger Reininger and farmer Clinton Grunke. Schellpeper placed first in the primary by a wide margin, winning 57 percent of the vote to Reininger's 28 percent and Grunke's 15 percent. Schellpeper won the general election in a landslide, winning 70–30 percent.

Schellpeper ran for re-election in 1990, and was challenged by Roland Langemeier, the former president of the Schuyler Chamber of Commerce, and Lawrence Marvin, a former high school teacher and forklift operator. Schellpeper placed first in the primary, receiving 62 percent of the vote, and advanced to the general election with Langemeier, who placed second with 32 percent. In the general election, Schellpeper defeated Langemeier, receiving 59 percent of the vote to Langemeier's 41 percent.

In 1994, Schellpeper sought a third term, and was challenged by Gail Axen, a minister. In the primary election, Schellpeper won 76 percent of the vote to Axen's 24 percent, and they advanced to the general election, where Schellpeper won re-election with 81 percent of the vote.

Schellpeper won re-election in 1998 without opposition.

== Death ==
Schellpeper died on April 4, 1999.
