= Forest, Texas =

- Unincorporated community
- Location within the state of Texas Forest (the United States)
- Coordinates: 31°30′57″N 95°0′42″W
- Country: United States
- State: Texas
- County: Cherokee
- Elevation: 296 ft (90 m)
- Time zone: UTC-6 (Central (CST))
  - Summer (DST): UTC-5 (CDT)
- Area code(s): 430 & 903
- GNIS feature ID: 2034940

Forest is a community located in southeastern Cherokee County, Texas, United States. According to the Handbook of Texas, the community had a population of 85 in 2000. It is located within the Tyler-Jacksonville combined statistical area.

== History ==
In 1847, Wiley Thompson had opened the first businesses, consisting of a store, saloon, watermill, gristmill, and cotton gin on Larrison Creek. It was given the name Forest because a traveler was resting under a tree and was there "for rest". The first postmaster of Forest was appointed in 1879. The Forest Baptist Church was established in 1888 with a pastor surnamed Rushing. During the 1920s and 1930s, the Forest area produced tomatoes, and two tomato packing sheds were built beside the St. Louis Southwestern Railway of Texas. The post office was transferred to Wells in 1887, was routed back to the community that same year, then permanently changed to Wells in 1980. As of the 1980s, Forest is mostly a cattle community, and its only store is in and out of business. Forest's population was reported as around 100 in the early twentieth century. In the 1950s, the population rose to its peak of 120. By 2000, it had dropped to 85.

== Geography ==
Forest is located on Farm to Market Road 1911, 10 mi (16 km) south of Alto in southeastern Cherokee County.

== Education ==
Forest is served by the Wells Independent School District.
