= Church of Wells =

American religious group

Coordinates: 31.49216°N 94.94989°W

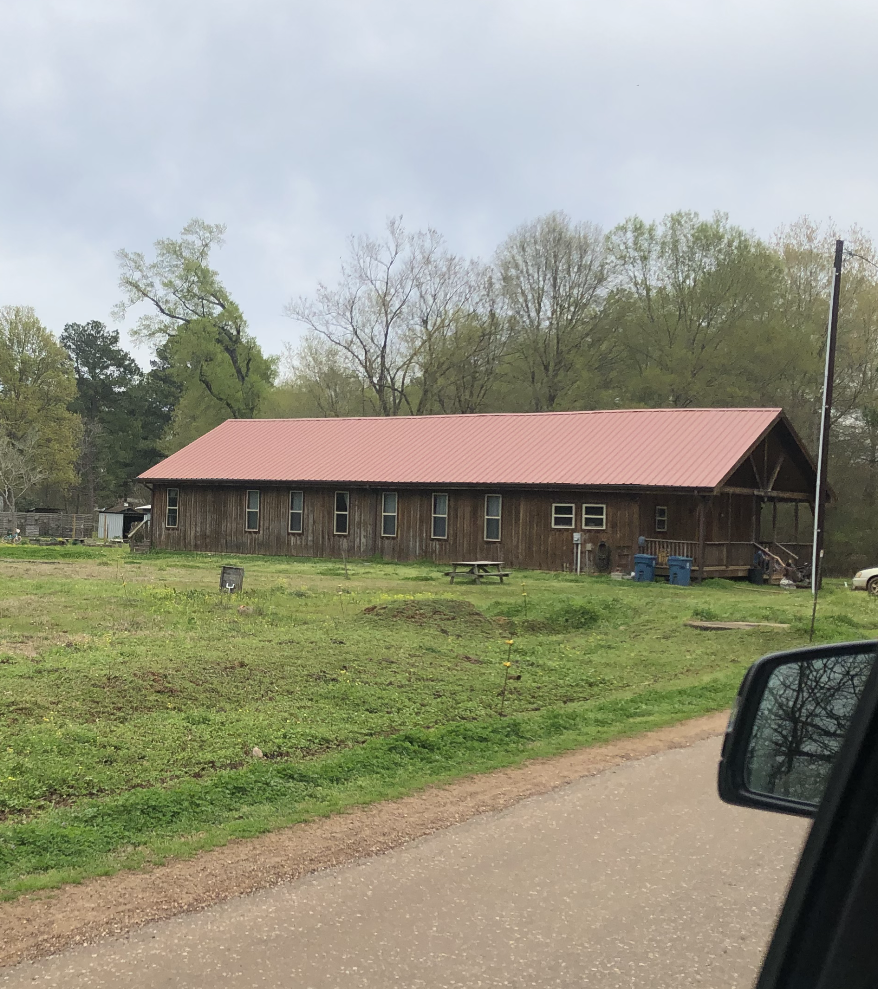
- Church building in 2020
- Classification: New Christian religious movement
- Orientation: Fundamentalist Christian
- Theology: Revivalist
- Moderator: Sean Morris, Jake Gardner, Ryan Ringnald
- Region: Wells, Texas
- Origin: 2011; Wells, Texas
- Members: 90
- Other names: Church of Arlington; You Must Be Born Again (YMBBA) Ministries (both formerly)
- Official website: thechurchofwells.com

The Church of Wells (formerly the Church of Arlington, or You Must Be Born Again (YMBBA) Ministries) is an American religious group located in Wells, Texas, United States, that some consider to be a cult. The group is led by Sean Morris, Jacob Gardner, and Ryan Ringnald, former street preachers. It has approximately ninety members, many being young adults and children.

The church and its members have been involved in several controversies such as the delayed reporting of a three-day-old infant's death. Many church members have engaged in disorderly and disruptive behavior, such as disrupting a Lakewood Church service. Some of their disturbances have led to criminal charges and convictions. They believe this is consistent with biblical persecution. Accounts of individuals abandoning their families and former way of life, such as Catherine Grove, have led to the idea the group could be an emerging cult. One man claimed he was kidnapped and drugged by the church; his story aired on the talk show Dr. Phil. In addition, one of the church's "side businesses", a sawmill, has faced numerous complaints and citations by the federal Occupational Safety and Health Administration (OSHA) due to unsafe working conditions and use of child labor.

== History ==
In 2004, Morris and Ringnald met as roommates at Baylor University. Both students met and made friends with Gardner as regulars of Antioch Community Church in Waco, Texas. After attending Antioch Waco for several years, they left and founded the Church of Wells in 2011.

== Controversies ==
In May 2012, a three-day-old infant whose parents were believed to belong to the group died. Instead of seeking medical attention, church members attended the apartment and prayed for the baby for "hours". Members of the Cherokee County Sheriff's Office stated that the baby had died the previous day. The Sheriff's Office and Child Protective Services began investigating the incident.

In July 2013, Catherine Grove, 26, disappeared from her home in Arkansas without notice, abandoning her car and belongings, only to resurface weeks later under heavy guard at the Church of Wells. She said that she was not being held against her will, and was only "seeking the Lord." On April 2, 2015, Grove called her father, said "I need you in Wells," and hung up the phone. Four hours later, Grove was seen walking down U.S. Highway 69 headed towards Lufkin, Texas. A few minutes after crossing the Angelina County line, she called 9-1-1 using a motorist's cell phone. During the call, Grove sounded "frightened" and "confused." Deputies drove Grove to the Angelina County Sheriff's Office in Lufkin. Captain Alton Lenderman of the Angelina County Sheriff's Office described Grove as being "very meek and very afraid to speak." Captain Lenderman stated that he did not press Grove on why she left the church, but did state that she never mentioned wanting to go back. When asked if she was hungry she said that she wished to have a burger and fries from Burger King. Grove's father was contacted and they were reunited in Lufkin the next day at 1:00 am. Grove initially showed intention to leave the church, but she returned to the church twelve days later on April 14, 2015.

In October 2013, Lufkin police received a call that three men were seen approaching Lufkin High School at 4:50 pm. When police arrived, the men were identified by a reporter as members of the Church of Wells. The police issued criminal trespassing warnings and the three men were banned from all Lufkin Independent School District campuses.

In April 2014, Sean Morris and member Taylor Clifton were injured following a physical altercation during the Wells community homecoming parade. Witnesses report the two men caused a disturbance by "preaching harshly and screaming 'You're going to hell' to children, parents and parade-goers."

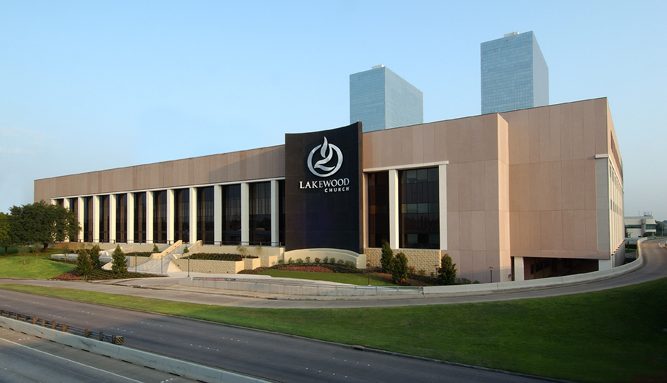
Lakewood Church, where Church of Wells members disrupted a service in 2015.

On June 28, 2015, six members of the Church of Wells interrupted a service of Lakewood Church in Houston, heckling Pastor Joel Osteen and calling him a liar. In June 2016, four of the members of the Church of Wells involved in the incident were tried and acquitted of disturbing a public meeting by a Texas jury.

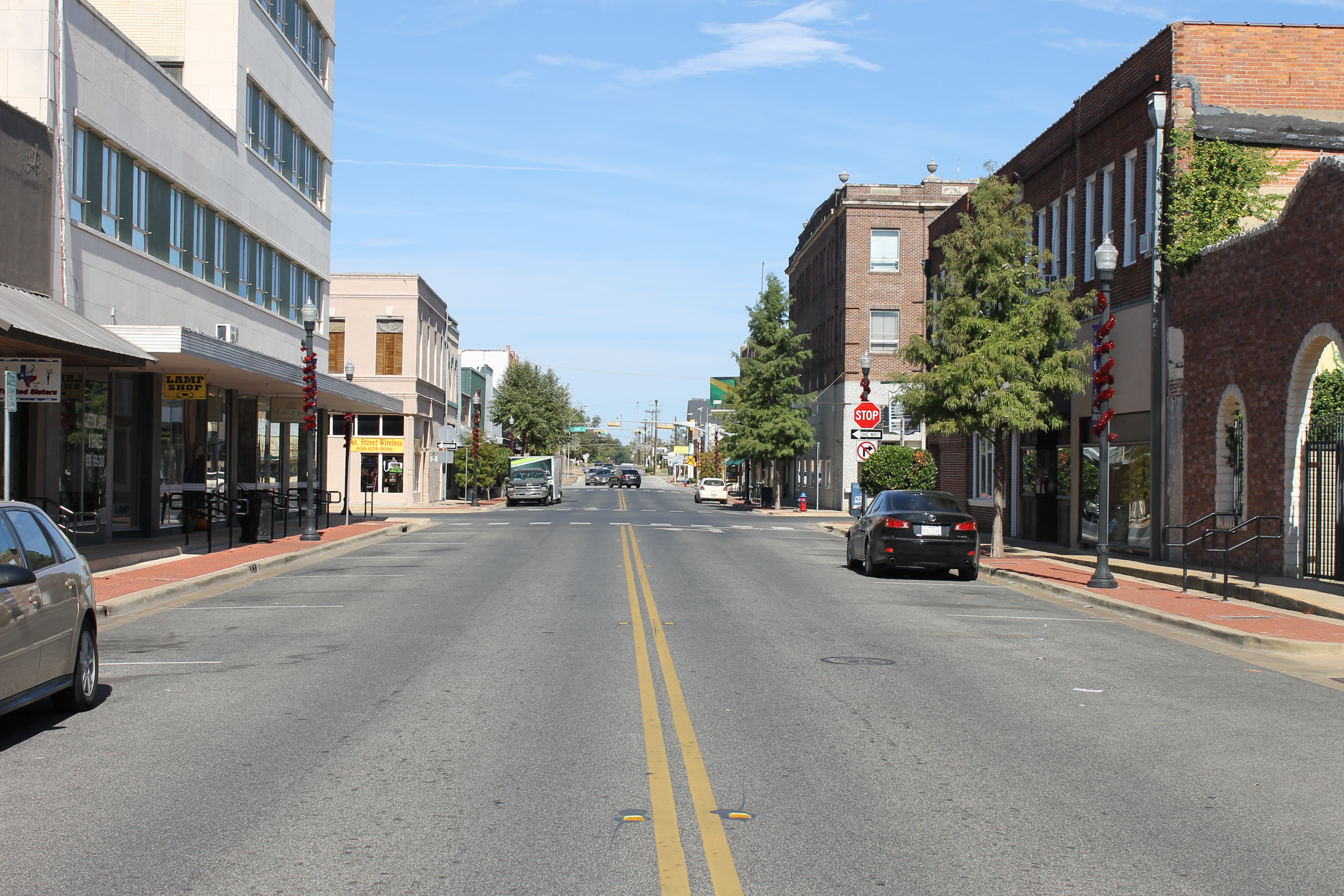
Downtown Lufkin, where church members disrupted a Christmas parade in 2015.

On November 30, 2015, the Lufkin Police Department received several calls claiming church member Taylor Clifton and other members were yelling, following people, and interfering with parade floats during the 2015 annual Christmas parade. They were accused of yelling "He doesn't want you to burn" and "it is an abomination." When police arrived, they explained the church could continue to share their message as long as it didn't disrupt the parade. All church members complied except Clifton, who continued to yell, scaring young children and upsetting parents. Police attempted to calm Clifton (as well as the parents and children), but he refused to comply and was arrested. During the incident, one church member was assaulted by a civilian, but no charges were filed. Clifton was charged with disorderly conduct and interfering with an event. Judge Derrick Flournoy found Clifton guilty of disorderly conduct and not guilty of interfering with an event. He posted bond for $1000, was released on December 1, and was fined $100.

On December 28, 2015, church members Matthew DeRouville and James Robert MacPherson III were arrested in Alto, Texas for refusing to leave an auto parts store after telling an unmarried pregnant employee she would go to Hell if she did not repent. In June 2017, DeRouville and MacPherson were found guilty of criminal trespassing, sentenced to spend 90 days in jail, and fined $2000; however, they paid their fine within 14 days and spent only 45 days in jail.

In March 2016, members of the church disrupted a Baptist church service in Saranac Lake, New York.

In October 2016, a young outreach minister named Jordan Reichenberger alleged he was drugged, kidnapped, and indoctrinated by church members. He claims to have been approached by two church elders in downtown Austin, and he says that he became disoriented after drinking a bottle of water offered by the two. Shortly after, they drove Reichenberger to the church complex in Wells, where he claims that he was habitually drugged and physically held against his will in an effort to brainwash him. After five days, his brother Ian tracked Jordan's location down via cellphone and his family travelled to Wells to get him out. Upon arrival, Reichenberger's family had a verbal dispute with church members, and after several hours, were finally able to get him out of the compound. A subsequent hair and blood analysis verified evidence of the drugging.

In April 2018, Reichenberger recounted his story on the talk show Dr. Phil in a two parter of season 16, episodes 144-145. During the show, local Mainline Protestant pastor James Maddox discussed his opinion of the church. He believed the camera crew had spotted "sweat lodges" where people were deprived of sleep, water, and nutrition as a form of indoctrination. The parents of Catherine Grove also appeared and discussed their story on the show.

In June 2022 Texas Monthly reported that one of the church's side businesses, a sawmill, was responsible for 25% of all reported sawmill accidents in the entire state, along with allegations of child labor law violations and unreported accidents. The sawmill would later be cited by OSHA. In addition the sawmill's purported owner was sued by Green Mountain Energy for over $16,000 in unpaid electric bills.

In May-June 2025, the Church of Wells led a protest against the National Eucharistic Pilgrimage, a Catholic event held in multiple sites across the United States. The Pilgrimage has groups of several young adult Catholics carry the Holy Eucharist, which is the consecrated Host believed to have the true and real presence Jesus Christ. The Church of Wells followed the event route, protesting with megaphones and engaging in anti-Catholic street evangelization, as well as disrupting attendees’ prayers; this attracted additional anti-Catholics from outside their group. Members soon began harassing individuals by name, leading to event organizers tightening security.
