= Oliver Olinger =

American politician (1893–1972)

Member of the Nebraska Legislature from the 12th district
- In office January 6, 1959 – January 3, 1961
- Preceded by: John Beaver
- Succeeded by: William Hasebroock

Personal details
- Born: July 30, 1893 Tekamah, Nebraska
- Died: May 21, 1972 (aged 78) Tekamah, Nebraska
- Party: Democratic
- Spouse: Mabel Irene Cornish (m. 1917)
- Children: 4 (Ida, William, James, Kenneth)
- Education: Nebraska Wesleyan University; University of Nebraska
- Occupation: Farmer, teacher

Oliver O. Olinger (July 30, 1893 – May 21, 1972) was a Democratic politician from Nebraska who served as a member of the Nebraska Legislature from the 12th district from 1959 to 1961.

== Early life ==
Olinger was born in Tekamah, Nebraska, in 1893, and graduated from Tekamah High School in 1911. He attended Nebraska Wesleyan University and the University of Nebraska, and later worked as a farmer. Olinger was a tenant farmer from 1917 to 1926, and owned a farm from 1927 until 1957. He was also a rural school teacher, served as the Thurston County Extension Agent, and was a member of several local school boards.

In 1934, Olinger ran for Burt County Assessor, and won the Democratic primary by a wide margin, defeating Clarence Rhoda and Dave Alexander. Olinger won the general election, defeating Republican nominee D. H. Struthers.

Olinger ran for re-election in 1938, and won the Democratic nomination unopposed. He narrowly won the general election, ultimately defeating H. A. Loersch. Olinger did not serve out his full term, and resigned in 1942, citing his ongoing duties on his farm.

== Nebraska Legislature ==
In 1958, State Senator John Beaver declined to seek a second term in the state legislature, and Olinger ran to succeed him in the 12th district, which was based in Burt and Cuming counties. In the nonpartisan primary, Olinger faced livestock breeder R. C. Graff, West Point Mayor William Hasebroock, and farmer Robert Skinner. Olinger placed second in the primary, receiving 29 percent of the vote to Hasebroock's 37 percent, and they advanced to the general election. Olinger narrowly defeated Hasebroock, winning 52 percent of the vote to his 48 percent.

Olinger ran for re-election in 1960, and was challenged by Hasebroock in a rematch of their 1958 campaign. Olinger narrowly placed first in the primary election, receiving 51 percent of the vote to Hasebroock's 49 percent. Hasebroock defeated Olinger in the general election, winning 53–47 percent.

== Death ==
Olinger died May 21, 1972.
