= Kathy Campbell =

American politician (born 1946)

Member of the Nebraska Legislature from the 25th district
- In office 2009–2017
- Preceded by: Ron Raikes
- Succeeded by: Suzanne Geist

Personal details
- Born: December 1, 1946 (age 79) Norfolk, Nebraska
- Party: Republican

Kathy Campbell (born Kathy Kuester, December 1, 1946) was a member of the state legislature in the U.S. state of Nebraska.

Campbell was born in Norfolk, Nebraska. In 2008, she was elected to represent the 25th Nebraska legislative district, which encompasses the northeast quarter of Lancaster County including the city of Waverly and the eastern portions of the city of Lincoln.

In 2009, Campbell, with Bill Avery and Gwen Howard, introduced LB 136, a bill to expand the eligibility for children to qualify for the State's Children Health Insurance Program (SCHIP).
