= Pam Redfield =

American politician

Member of the Nebraska Legislature from the 12th district
- In office 1998–2006
- Preceded by: Chris Abboud
- Succeeded by: Steve Lathrop

Personal details
- Born: 1948 (age 77–78) U.S.

Pam Redfield (born 1948) was a Nebraska state senator from Omaha, Nebraska in the Nebraska Legislature.

== Personal life ==
She was born Pam Turek on August 11, 1948, in Chicago, Illinois and graduated from Duchesne Academy in 1966. She attended the University of Nebraska–Lincoln and graduated from the University of Nebraska Omaha in education in 1969. She married Jerry Redfield and had six children. She is the chair of the Rotary International Foundation, is on the executive board of the National Conference of Insurance Legislators, and is a former member of the Ralston board of education.

== State legislature ==
Redfield won election to the Nebraska Legislature to represent the 12th legislative district in November 1998. However, she was then appointed to the Legislature by Governor Ben Nelson on November 30, 1998, after her predecessor Chris Abboud resigned early. She was then reelected in 2002. She served as the vice chairperson of the Banking, Commerce and Insurance committee and sat on the Revenue committee. Since Nebraska voters passed Initiative Measure 415 in 2001 limiting state senators to two consecutive terms after 2001, she was unable to run for reelection in 2006.

Preceded by Chris Abboud	Nebraska state senator-district 12; 1998–2006	Succeeded by Steve Lathrop
