= List of presidents pro tempore of the Nebraska Senate =

The president pro tempore of the Nebraska Senate (previously the president of the Nebraska Territorial Council and the president of the Nebraska Senate) was an office in the Nebraska Legislature which existed from 1855 to 1936 when Nebraska had a bicameral legislature. This office was created when the Nebraska Territory was first established and remained after Nebraska became a state. Under the Nebraska Constitution of 1866, this office was referred to as the president of the Senate since Nebraska had no office of lieutenant governor, but after the constitution of 1875 was adopted, which provided for a lieutenant governor who was to be the president of the Senate, this office became known as the president pro tempore (or "temporary president") of the Nebraska Senate. When Nebraska voters adopted a unicameral legislature beginning in 1937, this office ceased to exist and was replaced by a single speaker of the Nebraska Legislature.

== Presidents of the Nebraska Territorial Council ==
The upper house of the Nebraska Territorial Legislature was called the Nebraska Territorial Council, and its presiding officer was called a president. Ten individuals served as president of the Nebraska Territorial Council during its twelve sessions before Nebraska became a state. The office was briefly split when a faction of the Nebraska Territorial Legislature broke off from the meeting at Omaha, Nebraska, and convened at Florence, Nebraska, in January 1858.

# (Note: This is the number of the legislative session.)	Name	Session start	Session end	County of residence	Party (Note: Party affiliations during the time each individual served as speaker are listed here when known.)	Notes
1	Joseph L. Sharp	Jan 16, 1855	Mar 16, 1855	Richardson		
2	Benjamin R. Folsom	Dec 18, 1855	Jan 26, 1856	Burt		
3	Leavitt L. Bowen	Jan 5, 1857	Feb 18, 1857	Douglas	Dem	
4	George L. Miller	Dec 8, 1857	Jan 16, 1858	Douglas	Dem	Remained president of the minority faction that remained at Omaha
–	Leavitt L. Bowen	Jan 8, 1858	Jan 16, 1858	Douglas	Dem	Elected president of the majority faction that went to Florence
5	Leavitt L. Bowen	Sep 21, 1858	Nov 4, 1858	Sarpy	Dem	
6	Edmund A. Donelan	Dec 5, 1859	Jan 13, 1860	Cass	Dem	
7	William H. Taylor	Dec 3, 1860	Jan 11, 1861	Otoe	Rep	
8	John Taffe	Dec 2, 1861	Jan 10, 1862	Dakota	Rep	
9	Edwin A. Allen	Jan 7, 1864 (Note: No session was held in 1863.)	Feb 15, 1864	Washington		
10	Oliver P. Mason	Jan 5, 1865	Feb 13, 1865	Otoe	Rep	Later served as a Nebraska Supreme Court justice
11	Oliver P. Mason	Jan 4, 1866	Feb 12, 1866	Otoe	Rep	Later served as a Nebraska Supreme Court justice
12	Eliphus H. Rogers	Jan 10, 1867	Feb 18, 1867	Dodge	Rep	Later served as the second president of the Nebraska Senate

== Presidents of the Nebraska Senate ==
After Nebraska became a state in 1867, the upper house of the Nebraska Legislature was called the Nebraska Senate and became the successor to the Territorial Council. Since the Nebraska Constitution of 1866 did not provide for an office of lieutenant governor, it empowered the Nebraska Senate to choose its own presiding officer, called the president of the Senate.

#	Name	Tenure	Place of residence	Party	Notes
1	Frank Welch	1866	Decatur	Rep	
2	Eliphus H. Rogers	1867–1868	Dodge County	Rep	Previously served as the last president of the Territorial Council
3	Edward B. Taylor	1869–1870	Douglas County	Rep	
4	Ebenezer E. Cunningham	1871	Richardson County	Rep	
5	Isaac S. Hascall	1871–1872	Douglas County		Briefly was acting governor in 1872 as president while Acting Governor William H. James was absent from the state.
6	William A. Gwyer	1873–1874	Omaha	Rep	
7	Nathan K. Griggs	1875	Beatrice	Rep	
8	Guy C. Barton	1876	North Platte	Rep	

== Presidents pro tempore of the Nebraska Senate ==
When the Nebraska Constitution of 1875 created the office of Lieutenant Governor of Nebraska, it declared that "[t]he lieutenant governor shall be president of the senate." The constitution of 1875 additionally provided that "the senate shall choose a temporary president, to preside when the Lieutenant Governor shall not attend as president, or shall act as Governor," thus transforming this office into the office of president pro tempore of the Nebraska Senate. This office was abolished after 1936 when Nebraska adopted a unicameral legislature.

# (Note: The Nebraska Blue Book considers this office in continuity with the office of president of the Senate under the previous constitution, and thus the numbering continues from that office.)	Name	Tenure	Place of residence	Party	Notes
9	George F. Blanchard	1877–1878	Fremont	Rep	
10	William Marshall	1879–1880	Fremont	Rep	
11	John B. Dinsmore	1881–1882	Sutton	Rep	
12	Alexander H. Conner	1883–1884	Kearney	Rep	
13	Church Howe	1885–1886	Howe	Rep	Later served as the 15th president pro tempore
14	George D. Meiklejohn	1887–1888	Fullerton	Rep	Later served as the Nebraska Lieutenant Governor
15	Church Howe	1889–1890	Howe	Rep	Previously served as the 13th president pro tempore
16	William A. Poynter	1891–1892	Albion	Fus	Later served as Governor of Nebraska
17	Erasmus M. Correll	1893–1894	Hebron	Rep	
18	John C. Watson	1895–1896	Nebraska City	Rep	Previously served as the speaker of the Nebraska House of Representatives
19	Frank T. Ransom	1897–1898	Omaha	Fus	
20	Adolphus R. Talbot	1899–1900	Lincoln	Rep	
21	Calvin F. Steele	1901–1902	Fairbury	Rep	Served during a vacancy in the office of lieutenant governor, meaning Steele was considered the acting lieutenant governor by virtue of his being president pro tempore of the Senate
22	William Henry Harrison	1903–1904	Grand Island	Rep	
23	William H. Jennings	1905–1906	Davenport	Rep	
24	Charles L. Saunders	1907–1908	Omaha	Rep	Later served as the 32nd president pro tempore; son of Alvin Saunders
25	George W. Tibbets	1909–1910	Hastings	Dem	
26	John H. Morehead	1911–1912	Falls City	Dem	Served during a vacancy in the office of lieutenant governor, meaning Morehead was considered the acting lieutenant governor by virtue of his being president pro tempore of the Senate; later served as Governor of Nebraska
27	James H. Kemp	1913–1914	Fullerton	Rep	
28	Phillip H. Kohl	1915–1916	Wayne	Dem	
29	John Mattes Jr.	1917–1918	Nebraska City	Dem	
30	Berton Kenyon Bushee	1919–1920	Kimball	Rep	
31	Richard S. Norval	1921–1922	Seward	Rep	
32	Charles L. Saunders	1923–1924	Omaha	Rep	Previously served as the 24th president pro tempore; son of Alvin Saunders
33	John W. Robbins	1925–1926	Omaha	Rep	
34	Perry A. C. Reed	1927–1928	Henderson	Rep	
35	John W. Cooper	1929–1930	Omaha	Rep	
36	John C. McGowan	1931–1932	Norfolk	Rep	
37	Frank McCarter	1933–1934	Bayard	Dem	
38	Cloyd L. Stewart	1935	Clay Center	Dem	Resigned from the Nebraska Senate
39	Arthur L. Neumann	1935–1936	Oakland	Dem	

== See also ==
- List of Nebraska state legislatures
