= List of Nebraska state legislatures =

The legislature of the U.S. state of Nebraska has convened many times since statehood became effective on March 1, 1867.

== Legislatures ==
Name	Start date	End date	Last election
Nebraska Constitution of 1866 (Note: The Nebraska Constitution of 1866, Article II, specified elections in October for both chambers every two years. Sessions began in January.)
1st Nebraska legislature	July 4, 1866	July 11, 1866	
2nd Nebraska legislature	February 20, 1867	February 21, 1867	
3rd Nebraska legislature	1868		
4th Nebraska legislature	1869		
5th Nebraska legislature	1870		
6th Nebraska legislature	1871		
7th Nebraska legislature	1872		
8th Nebraska legislature	1873		
9th Nebraska legislature	1874		
10th Nebraska legislature	1875		
Nebraska Constitution of 1875 (Note: The Nebraska Constitution of 1875 specified elections in November for both chambers every two years. Legislative sessions began in January every two years.)
11th Nebraska legislature	1876		October 1875
12th Nebraska legislature	1876		
13th Nebraska legislature	1877		
14th Nebraska legislature	1878		
15th Nebraska legislature	1879		
16th Nebraska legislature	1881		
17th Nebraska legislature	1882		
18th Nebraska legislature	1883		November 1882
19th Nebraska legislature	1885		November 1884
20th Nebraska legislature	1887		November 1886
21st Nebraska legislature	1889		November 1888
22nd Nebraska legislature	1891		November 1890
23rd Nebraska legislature	1893		November 1892
24th Nebraska legislature	1895		November 1894
25th Nebraska legislature	1897		November 1896
26th Nebraska legislature	1899		November 1898
27th Nebraska legislature	January 1, 1901	March 28, 1901	November 1900
28th Nebraska legislature	1903		November 1902
29th Nebraska legislature	1905		November 1904
30th Nebraska legislature	1907		November 1906
31st Nebraska legislature	1909		November 1908
32nd Nebraska legislature	1911		
33rd Nebraska legislature	1913		
34th Nebraska legislature	1915		
35th Nebraska legislature	1917		
36th Nebraska legislature	1918		
37th Nebraska legislature	1919		
38th Nebraska legislature	1919		
39th Nebraska legislature	1919		
40th Nebraska legislature	1921		
41st Nebraska legislature	1922		
42nd Nebraska legislature	1923		
43rd Nebraska legislature	1925		
44th Nebraska legislature	1927		
45th Nebraska legislature	1929		
46th Nebraska legislature	1930		
47th Nebraska legislature	1931		
48th Nebraska legislature	1931		
49th Nebraska legislature	1933		
50th Nebraska legislature	1935		
51st Nebraska legislature	1935		
52nd Nebraska legislature	1937		
53rd Nebraska legislature	1939		
54th Nebraska legislature	1940		
55th Nebraska legislature	1941		
56th Nebraska legislature	1942		
57th Nebraska legislature	1943		
58th Nebraska legislature	1944		
59th Nebraska legislature	1946		
60th Nebraska legislature	1947		
61st Nebraska legislature	1949		
62nd Nebraska legislature	1951		
63rd Nebraska legislature	1952		
64th Nebraska legislature	1952		
65th Nebraska legislature	1953		
66th Nebraska legislature	1954		
67th Nebraska legislature	1955		
68th Nebraska legislature	1957		
69th Nebraska legislature	1959		
70th Nebraska legislature	1960		
71st Nebraska legislature	1960		
72nd Nebraska legislature	1961		
73rd Nebraska legislature	1963		
74th Nebraska legislature	1964		
75th Nebraska legislature	1965		
76th Nebraska legislature	1966		
77th Nebraska legislature	1967		
78th Nebraska legislature	1968		
79th Nebraska legislature	1968		
80th Nebraska legislature	1969		
81st Nebraska legislature	1970		
82nd Nebraska legislature	1971		
83rd Nebraska legislature	1973		
84th Nebraska legislature	1975		
85th Nebraska legislature	1977		
86th Nebraska legislature	1979		
87th Nebraska legislature	1981		
88th Nebraska legislature	1983		
89th Nebraska legislature	1985		
90th Nebraska legislature	1987		
91st Nebraska legislature	1989		
92nd Nebraska legislature	1991		
93rd Nebraska legislature	1993		
94th Nebraska legislature	1995		
95th Nebraska legislature	1997	1998	
96th Nebraska legislature	1999		
97th Nebraska legislature	2001		November 2000
98th Nebraska legislature	2003		November 2002
99th Nebraska legislature	2005		November 2004
100th Nebraska legislature	2007		November 2006
101st Nebraska legislature	January 7, 2009		November 2008
102nd Nebraska legislature	2011		November 2010
103rd Nebraska legislature	2013		November 2012
104th Nebraska legislature	2015		November 2014
105th Nebraska legislature	2017		November 2016
106th Nebraska legislature	2019		November: 2018 Nebraska Legislature election
107th Nebraska legislature	2021		November: 2020 Nebraska Legislature election
108th	2023		November: 2022 Nebraska Legislature election
109th	2025		November 5: 2024 Nebraska Legislature election

== See also ==
- List of speakers of the Nebraska Legislature, 1937–present
- List of speakers of the Nebraska House of Representatives, 1866–1936
- List of presidents pro tempore of the Nebraska Senate, 1866–1936
- List of governors of Nebraska
- Politics of Nebraska
- Elections in Nebraska
- Nebraska State Capitol
- Historical outline of Nebraska
- Lists of United States state legislative sessions
