= Ron Raikes =

American politician (1943–2009)

Member of the Nebraska Legislature from the 25th district
- In office May 15, 1997 – January 7, 2009
- Preceded by: Jerome Warner
- Succeeded by: Kathy Campbell

Personal details
- Born: March 11, 1943 Lincoln, Nebraska
- Died: September 5, 2009 (aged 66) Ashland, Nebraska
- Party: Independent
- Spouse: Helen Holz Raikes (m. 1966)
- Children: 3 (Heather, Abbie, Justin)
- Education: Iowa State University (B.S.); University of California, Davis (M.S., Ph.D.)
- Occupation: Farmer, economics professor

Ronald Eugene "Ron" Raikes (March 11, 1943 – September 5, 2009) was an independent politician from Nebraska who served as a member of the Nebraska Legislature from the 25th district from 1997 to 2009.

== Early life ==
Raikes was born in Lincoln, Nebraska, in 1943, and grew up in Ashland, graduating from Ashland High School. He graduated from Iowa State University with his bachelor's degree in economics, and then attended the University of California, Davis, receiving his master's degree in agriculture business management and his doctorate in agriculture economics. Raikes began a tenure-track position in the Iowa State University Department of Economics, where he taught agricultural economics, but left the university to return to his family farm in 1978. Raikes served as a member of the Nebraskas Economic Forecasting Advisory Board from 1983 to 1987.

== Nebraska Legislature ==
In 1997, following the death of State Senator Jerome Warner, Governor Ben Nelson appointed Raikes to serve until a 1998 special election. He was sworn in on May 15, 1997. Raikes ran in the special election, and was challenged by auto broker Dennis Zager and police officer John Carter. Raikes placed first in the primary election, winning 59 percent of the vote to Zager's 21 percent and Carter's 19 percent. Raikes and Zager advanced to the general election, where Raikes won in a landslide, defeating Zager, 70–30 percent.

Raikes ran for re-election in 2000 and 2004, and was unopposed each time. He was term-limited in 2008, and unable to run for re-election to a fourth term.

== Death ==
Raikes died on September 5, 2009, in a farming accident.

== See also ==
- Nebraska Legislature
