= William Hasebroock =

American politician (1903–1979)

Speaker of the Nebraska Legislature
- In office January 5, 1971 – January 2, 1973
- Preceded by: Jerome Warner
- Succeeded by: Richard Proud

Member of the Nebraska Legislature
- In office January 3, 1961 – May 22, 1979
- Preceded by: Oliver Olinger
- Succeeded by: Harry Chronister
- Constituency: 12th district (1961–1965); 16th district (1965–1967); 18th district (1967–1979)

Personal details
- Born: July 30, 1903 near Scribner, Nebraska
- Died: May 22, 1979 (aged 75) Lincoln, Nebraska
- Party: Republican
- Spouse: Margaret McDonald (m. 1928)
- Children: 1 (Robert)
- Occupation: Farmer, businessman

William H. Hasebroock (July 30, 1903 – May 22, 1979) was a Republican politician from Nebraska who served as Speaker of the Nebraska Legislature from 1971 to 1973 and as a member of the Nebraska Legislature from 1961 until his death in 1979.

== Early life ==
Hasebroock was born on a farm near Scribner, Nebraska, in 1903, and graduated from Scribner High School. He was a farmer and businessman, and served as Mayor of Scribner for two terms before moving to West Point in 1941. Hasebroock was elected Mayor of West Point in 1946.

== Nebraska Legislature ==
In 1958, State Senator John Beaver, who served as Speaker of the Legislature, declined to seek re-election, and Hasebroock ran to succeed him in the 12th district, which was based in Burt and Cuming counties. He faced farmer Robert Skinner, former Burt County Assessor Oliver Olinger, and livestock breeder R. C. Graff in the nonpartisan primary. Hasebroock placed first in the primary, winning 37 percent of the vote, and advanced to the general election with Olinger, who placed second with 29 percent. In the general election, Hasebroock narrowly lost to Olinger, winning 48 percent of the vote to his 52 percent.

Hasebroock ran against Olinger in 1960. In the primary election, Olinger narrowly placed first, winning 51 percent of the vote to Hasebroock's 49 percent. They proceeded to the general election, where Hasebroock won, defeating Olinger with 53 percent of the vote.

In 1962, Hasebroock ran for re-election, and was challenged by Chester Graff, a director of the Cuming County Public Power District. After Graff, an incumbent officeholder, missed the deadline for officeholders to file, he mounted a write-in campaign. Hasebroock won 78 percent of the vote in the primary election, with Graf winning 830 votes and 22 percent. Graff received enough votes to be nominated, and they both advanced to the general election. Hasebroock defeated Graff in a landslide, winning 65 percent of the vote to Graff's 35 percent.

Following redistricting, Hasebroock ran for re-election in 1964 in the 16th district, which swapped out Burt County for Colfax County. He was challenged by Harold Dinklage and Frank Cada, both of whom were farmers. In the primary election, Hasebroock placed first, winning 46 percent of the vote, and Cada narrowly beat out Dinklage to advance to the general election. Hasebroock only narrowly defeated Cada in the general election, winning his third term, 51–49 percent.

In 1966, after the legislature was expanded to 49 members, Hasebroock ran for re-election in the 18th district, which consisted of Colfax, Cuming, and Stanton counties. He was placed into the same district as State Senator Peter H. Claussen, who ran for re-election, and also faced a rematch with Cada. Hasebroock received 47 percent of the vote in the primary election, and proceeded to the general election with Cada, who placed second with 31 percent. Hasebroock again defeated Cada by a thin margin, receiving 51 percent of the vote to his 49 percent.

Hasebroock was re-elected without opposition in 1970. After the election, Hasebroock announced that he would run for Speaker. He narrowly defeated State Senator Jules Burbach, winning 25 votes to Burbach's 23 on the secret ballot, and took office.

In 1974, he sought re-election to a sixth term. He was challenged by Hugo Srb, a former State Senator who served as clerk of the legislature from 1937 to 1969; college student Brendan Moore; and former fireman Frank Vesely. Hasebroock won 62 percent of the vote in the primary election, and faced Srb, who received 17 percent of the vote, in the general election. In the general election, Hasebroock defeated Srb in a landslide, winning re-election, 70–30 percent. He was re-elected without opposition in 1978.

== Death ==
Hasebroock died on May 22, 1979, less than a year into his seventh term.
