= Martin Kahle =

American politician (1916–1984)

Member of the Nebraska Legislature from the 37th district
- In office January 5, 1977 – October 2, 1984
- Preceded by: Gary Anderson
- Succeeded by: Jerry D. Miller

Personal details
- Born: April 6, 1916 Kearney, Nebraska
- Died: October 2, 1984 (aged 68) Kearney, Nebraska
- Party: Democratic
- Spouse: Faye Larson (m. 1939)
- Children: 4 (Ronald, Alton, Sharilyn, LaNita)
- Occupation: Farmer-stockman, agribusiness

Martin Kahle (April 6, 1916 – October 2, 1984) was a Democratic politician from Nebraska who served as a member of the Nebraska Legislature from the 37th district from 1977 until his death in 1984.

== Early life ==
Kahle was bron in Kearney, Nebraska, in 1916. He graduated from Newark High School and worked as a farmer. Kahle served on the Kearney County Board of Supervisors from 1969 to 1977, and was appointed by Governor J. James Exon to the Nebraska State Environmental Control Council in 1975.

== Nebraska Legislature ==
In 1976, Kahle ran for the legislature to succeed State Senator Gary Anderson in the 37th district, which included Buffalo, Franklin, Kearney, Nuckolls, and Webster counties. In the nonpartisan primary, Kahle faced former State Senator Richard Ely and activist Frances Ohmstede. Kahle placed first in the primary, winning 44 percent of the vote to Ely's 35 percent. They both advanced to the general election, where Kahle defeated Ely, 54–46 percent.

Kahle ran for a second term in 1980. He faced no opponents and won his second term unopposed.

In 1984, Kahle sought a third term, and was challenged by farmer Jerry D. Miller. Kahle placed first in the primary over Miller by a wide margin, winning 65 percent of the vote to Miller's 35 percent. One month prior to the general election, on October 2, 1984, Kahle died. Though his name remained on the ballot, Miller won in a landslide, winning 74–26 percent.
