= Emil Von Seggern =

American politician (1882–1942)

Member of the Nebraska Legislature from the 12th district
- In office January 5, 1937 – January 7, 1941
- Preceded by: Position created
- Succeeded by: George Weborg

Member of the Nebraska House of Representatives from the 26th district
- In office January 1, 1935 – January 5, 1937
- Preceded by: R. V. Graff
- Succeeded by: Position abolished

Personal details
- Born: February 28, 1882 Hooper, Nebraska
- Died: September 12, 1942 (aged 60) Omaha, Nebraska
- Party: Democratic
- Spouse: Margaret Romberg (m. 1908)
- Children: 3
- Education: Fremont Normal School
- Occupation: Newspaper editor and publisher

Emil M. Von Seggern (February 28, 1882 – September 12, 1942) was a Democratic politician from Nebraska who served as a member of the Nebraska House of Representatives from the 26th district from 1935 to 1937 and as a member of the Nebraska Legislature from the 12th district from 1937 to 1941.

== Early life ==
Von Seggern was born in Hooper, Nebraska, in 1882. He graduated from Hooper High School and Fremont Normal School. In 1903, Von Seggern published the Nebraska Volksblatt, a German-language newspaper, in West Point. He shut down the Volksblatt in 1916 and sold the subscription list to the Omaha Daily Tribune, and purchased the West Point Republican. He served on the West Point City Council, and oversaw modernization efforts in the city, including the creation of the city sewer system, lighting plant, and paving.

== Nebraska House of Representatives ==
In 1934, Von Seggern ran for the Nebraska House of Representatives from the 26th district, challenging incumbent State Representative R. V. Graff in the Democratic primary. He defeated Graff, winning 48 percent of the vote to Graff's 24 percent and R. L. Crawford's 28 percent. In the general election, Von Seggern defeated Republican O. H. Brockman with 60 percent of the vote.

== Nebraska Legislature ==
When the bicameral legislature was abolished and replaced with a unicameral body, Von Seggern ran for the legislature in the newly created 12th district. In the nonpartisan primary, he faced State Senator Arthur L. Neumann, former State Representative Nels Johnson, Martin Roth, Dudley Beck. Von Seggern placed first in the primary, and proceeded to the general election with Neumann. In the general election, Von Seggern defeated Neumann with 56 percent of the vote.

In 1938, Von Seggern ran for re-election, and was challenged by Reverend Fred Hall. In the nonpartisan primary election, Von Seggern placed first, winning 70 percent of the vote to Hall's 30 percent. He defeated Hall with 65 percent of the vote in the general election.

Von Seggern declined to seek re-election in 1940, citing his need to focus on his newspaper.

== Personal life and death ==
Von Seggern married Margaret Romberg in 1908. They had three sons. He died on September 12, 1942, following complications from a sinus operation.
