= George Weborg =

American politician (1883–1968)

Member of the Nebraska Legislature from the 12th district
- In office January 5, 1941 – January 2, 1951
- Preceded by: Emil Von Seggern
- Succeeded by: John Beaver

Personal details
- Born: November 7, 1883 Osco, Illinois
- Died: October 22, 1968 (aged 84) Pender, Nebraska
- Cause of death: Car accident
- Party: Republican
- Spouse: Tyra Wollen (m. 1918)
- Children: 3
- Relatives: C. J. Weborg (father)
- Education: Lincoln Business College
- Occupation: Farmer, livestock feeder

George C. Weborg (November 7, 1883 – October 22, 1968) was a Republican politician from Nebraska who served as a member of the Nebraska Legislature from the 12th district from 1941 to 1951.

== Early life ==
Weborg was born in Henry County, Illinois, and grew up in Cuming County, Nebraska. His father, C. J. Weborg, served in the Nebraska House of Representatives. Weborg attended Lincoln Business College and was a farmer and livestock feeder. In 1920, he was elected to the Cuming County Board of Supervisors as a Republican, and served on the board until 1940.

== Nebraska Legislature ==
In 1940, when State Senator Emil Von Seggern declined to seek re-election, Weborg ran to succeed him in the 12th district. He faced seven opponents in the nonpartisan primary, and placed first, winning 23 percent of the vote, and advanced to the general election with former Tekamah Mayor S. A. Wassum, who placed second with 16 percent. In the general election, Weborg defeated Wassum with 57 percent of the vote.

Weborg ran for re-election in 1942, and was challenged by farmer Edward Swanson, who had run in the 1940 primary. He placed first in the primary, winning 60 percent of the vote to Weborg's 40 percent, and in the general election, defeated Swanson with 56 percent of the vote.

In 1944 and 1946, Weborg was re-elected unopposed. Weborg ran for a fifth term in 1948, and was challenged by L. Paul Johnson, a U.S. Navy veteran and University of Nebraska student. Weborg won 68 percent of the vote in the primary, and was re-elected in the general election with 66 percent of the vote.

Weborg declined to seek re-election in 1950.

== Post-legislative career ==
After leaving the legislature, Weborg and his wife moved to Pender in Thurston County. He was elected to the Thurston County Board of Supervisors in 1954.

== Death ==
Weborg died on October 4, 1968, in a car accident near Pender.
