= Kenneth Bowen (Nebraska politician) =

American politician (1912–1981)

Speaker of the Nebraska Legislature
- In office January 5, 1965 – January 3, 1967
- Preceded by: Bill Moulton
- Succeeded by: Elvin Adamson

Member of the Nebraska Legislature
- In office 1959 – January 4, 1967
- Preceded by: William McHenry
- Succeeded by: Richard Ely
- Constituency: 32nd district (1959–1965); 37th district (1965–1967)

Personal details
- Born: January 25, 1912 Red Cloud, Nebraska
- Died: April 18, 1981 (aged 69) Red Cloud, Nebraska
- Party: Republican
- Spouse: Kathryn V. Kirkbride (m. 1942)
- Children: 4 (Marilyn, Phillip, Richard, Jack)
- Occupation: Businessman

Kenneth L. Bowen (January 25, 1912 – April 18, 1981) was a Republican politician from Nebraska who served as Speaker of the Nebraska Legislature from 1965 to 1967 and as a member of the Nebraska Legislature from 1959 to 1967.

== Early life ==
Bowen was born in Red Cloud, Nebraska, and grew up in Kansas. He owned and operated several businesses in Red Cloud, including an automobile dealership, general store, a milling company, and an insurance firm. Bowen served as a member of the Red Cloud School Board.

In 1954, Bowen was elected Mayor of Red Cloud, and was re-elected in 1958.

== Nebraska Legislature ==
In 1958, Bowen ran for the state legislature from the 32nd district, which included Franklin, Nuckolls, and Webster counties. State Senator William McHenry died the previous year, and Governor Victor Anderson did not appoint a successor. In the nonpartisan primary, Bowen faced retired farmer Ray Lowery; former State Senator M. F. Rickard; farmer L. A. Wagoner; and Lee Williams, the manager of the American Legion Club in Superior. Bowen placed first in the primary, winning 39 percent of the vote to Lowery's 30 percent, and they advanced to the general election. Bowen defeated Lowery by a narrow margin, winning 53 percent to Lowery's 47 percent.

Bowen ran for re-election in 1960, He was challenged by Rickard, who had served in the Nebraska Senate and wanted "to try some of the things in the one-house Legislature which were successful when we had both houses." In the primary, Bowen placed first, winning 69 percent of the vote to Rickard's 31 percent. He defeated Rickard in the general election in a landslide, winning his second term, 65–35 percent.

In 1962, Bowen ran for a third term, and was again challenged by Rickard. He received 66 percent of the vote in the primary, and defeated Rickard in the general election with 64 percent of the vote.

Following redistricting, Bowen ran for a fourth term in the 37th district in 1964. He was challenged for re-election by former State Senator Kathleen Foote, the first woman elected to the unicameral legislature. Bowen narrowly placed first in the primary election, winning 53 percent of the vote to Foote's 47 percent. They proceeded to the general election, which Bowen ultimately won, defeating Foote with 55 percent of the vote.

Bowen emerged as a leading candidate for Speaker in the 1965 legislative session. He actively campaigned for the position, and on the first ballot, he received 19 of 49 votes, with Arnold Ruhnke placed second with 18, Jules Burbach receiving 5, Cecil Craft and Harold Stryker and receiving 3 each, and Elvin Adamson receiving 1. On the second ballot, Bowen received 21 votes to Ruhnke's 20, Bowen's 6, Stryker's 1, and George Gerdes's 1. Bowen was elected on the third ballot, defeating Ruhnke, 27–22.

In 1966, Bowen announced that he would resign from the legislature on January 5, 1967, to become the executive secretary to the League of Nebraska Municipalities. Governor Norbert Tiemann appointed Richard Ely to succeed him.

== Post-legislative career ==
Bowen served as the executive secretary to the League of Nebraska Municipalities from 1967 to 1969, and as the state director of the Farmers Home Administration from 1969 to 1977.

== Death ==
Bowen died on April 18, 1981.
