= Jerry Koch (Nebraska politician) =

American politician (1924–2007)

Member of the Nebraska Legislature from the 12th district
- In office January 8, 1975 – January 5, 1983
- Preceded by: Richard Proud
- Succeeded by: Chris Abboud

Personal details
- Born: May 23, 1924 Campbell, Nebraska
- Died: September 13, 2007 (aged 83) Ralston, Nebraska
- Party: Republican
- Spouse: Joan MacCashland
- Children: 2 (Rick, Scott)
- Education: Hastings College (B.A.); University of Nebraska
- Occupation: Teacher, coach

Military service
- Allegiance: United States
- Branch/service: United States Army Air Forces
- Years of service: 1943–1946

Gerald "Jerry" Koch (May 23, 1924 – September 13, 2007) was a Republican politician from Nebraska who served as a member of the Nebraska Legislature from the 12th district from 1975 to 1983. He later served as the Mayor of Ralston from 1985 to 1989.

== Early life ==
Koch was born in Campbell, Nebraska, in 1924, and served in the U.S. Army Air Forces during World War II from 1943 to 1946. He later attended Hastings College and the University of Nebraska. Koch taught and coached in Franklin from 1949 to 1954 and Westside Community Schools from 1954 to 1966, and in 1966, he became the coordinator of the Omaha Suburban Area Council of Schools.

In 1966, Koch was elected to the Ralston City Council. He was re-elected without opposition in 1968, and was narrowly re-elected in 1970 to a four-year term.

== Nebraska Legislature ==
State Senator Richard Proud, who served as the Speaker of the State Legislature, declined to seek another term in 1974. Businessman Bob Kerrey, then a Republican, encouraged Koch to run to succeed Proud in the 12th district, and after Koch launched his campaign, Kerrey helped managed his campaign. In the nonpartisan primary, Koch faced businessman James Eggers; former Omaha City Councilman Fred Jacobberger; Frank Serrao, the owner of an investment and contracting firm; and Emmajean Wupper, the former president of the Nebraska League of Women Voters. Koch placed first in the primary election, winning 33 percent of the vote to Wupper's 27 percent. They advanced to the general election, where Koch won by a wide margin, defeating Wupper, 58–42 percent.

In 1978, Koch considered running for Lieutenant Governor, but instead opted to run for re-election. He was challenged by attorney Robert Beach and Joseph Hastings, a partner at a real estate firm. Koch placed first in the primary, winning 61 percent of the vote to Beach's 30 percent and Hastings's 9 percent, and he and Beach proceeded to the general election. Koch defeated Beach in a landslide, winning 60 percent of the vote to Beach's 40 percent.

Koch ran for a third term in 1982, and was challenged by law student Chris Abboud, real estate and insurance agent John Hurley, and insurance agent Donald Jensen. Koch placed first in the nonpartisan primary, receiving 46 percent of the vote to Abbott's 38 percent, Hurley's 9 percent, and Jensen's 7 percent. Koch and Abboud advanced to the general election, and Abboud narrowly defeated him, winning 52–48 percent.

== Post-legislative career ==
In 1984, Joe Wager declined to seek another term as Mayor of Ralston, and Koch ran to succeed him. He was challenged by Bonny Abboud, the wife of former City Councilman Fred Abboud and mother of State Senator Chris Abboud, and businessman Joseph Grady. In the primary election, Koch placed first, receiving 47 percent of the vote to Abboud's 41 percent and Grady's 12 percent. Koch narrowly defeated Abboud in the general election, winning by just 44 votes.

While serving as mayor, Koch challenged Senator Abboud for re-election in 1986. Abboud placed first in the primary election by a wide margin, receiving 53 percent of the vote to Koch's 33 percent. Abboud defeated Koch in the general election in a landslide, winning 62–38 percent.

In 1988, Koch ran for re-election as mayor, and was challenged by City Councilwoman Julie Haney. Haney defeated Abboud by a wide margin, receiving 65 percent of the vote to Koch's 35 percent, and became the first female mayor of Ralston.

Koch ran for the Papio-Missouri River Natural Resources District Board in 1990, and defeated incumbent director Rosemary Ridenour. He was re-elected in 1994, and did not run for re-election in 1998.

== Death ==
Koch died on September 13, 2007.
