= Chronister, Texas =

Ghost town in East Texas

Coordinates: 31.5322°N 95.0168°W

Chronister is a ghost town located in Cherokee County, Texas, United States. The town is located north of Forest.

== History ==
Chronister was named for C. J. Chronister, a local lumber mill owner, with the community being built around his mill c1890s. By 1910 the community was incorporated into nearby Wildhurst.
