= Merv Riepe =

American politician (born 1942)

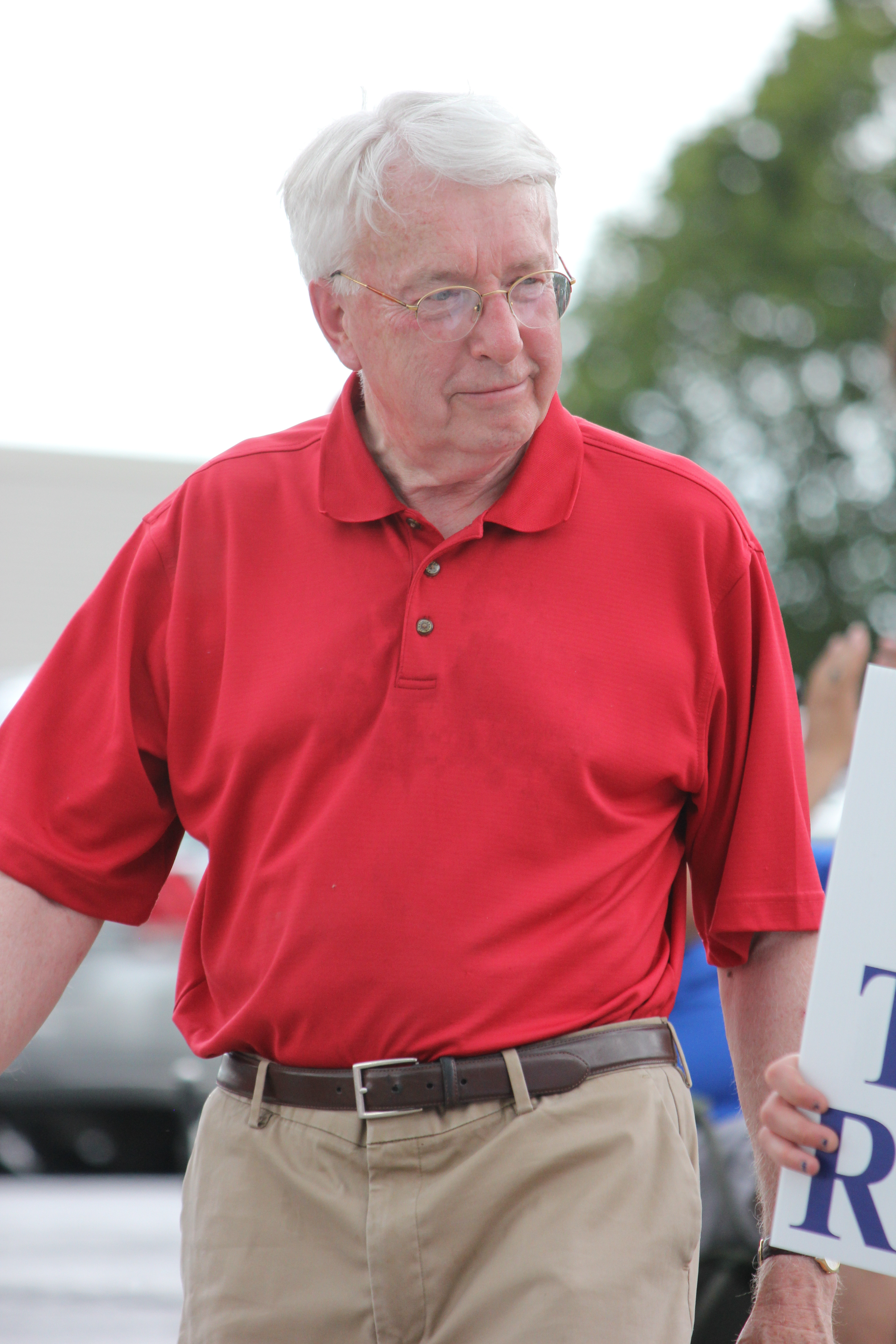

Member of the Nebraska Legislature from the 12th district
- Incumbent
- Assumed office January 4, 2023
- Preceded by: Steve Lathrop
- Succeeded by: Christy Knorr (elect)
- In office January 7, 2013 – January 9, 2019
- Preceded by: Steve Lathrop
- Succeeded by: Steve Lathrop

Personal details
- Born: July 16, 1942 (age 84) near Griswold, Iowa
- Party: Republican
- Education: University of Nebraska, Omaha (BS); University of Iowa (MA)

Mervin Merle Riepe (born July 16, 1942) is an American politician from the state of Nebraska. In 2014, he was elected to the Nebraska Legislature, representing a district in the Omaha metropolitan area. In 2018, he lost re-election to Democrat Steve Lathrop, but was re-elected to the Legislature in 2022 after Lathrop decided not to seek re-election.

== Personal life and professional career ==
Riepe was born July 16, 1942, in rural Griswold, Iowa. He graduated from Griswold High School in 1960, then served as a hospital corpsman in the U.S. Navy from 1960 to 1963. In 1968, he received a B.S. in finance from the University of Nebraska at Omaha; in 1970, an M.A. in health policy and management from the University of Iowa.

After leaving the navy, Riepe worked in the field of health-care management. In 1964, he was named director of the Respiratory Therapy Department at Bergan Mercy Medical Center in Omaha. He eventually served, at various times, as chief operating officer and interim CEO of Bergan Mercy; as president of Mercy Hospital in Council Bluffs, Iowa; and as president of Children's Physicians, a joint venture of Omaha's Children's Hospital & Medical Center and Creighton University. After retiring from Children's Health Network in 2008, he worked as a health-care consultant.

In 1974, Riepe married Janet Lee Anderson, a teacher at Benson High School in Omaha. The couple produced one son. Janet Riepe was diagnosed with multiple sclerosis in 1978, and died of pneumonia arising therefrom in March 1996. In November 1996, Riepe married Jody Gillispie.

== Political career ==
Riepe made two unsuccessful attempts to win a seat on the Ralston Public Schools Board of Education. In an election during the 1990s, he ran as an announced candidate; in 2010, he ran as a write-in.

=== 2014 election ===
In November 2013, Riepe announced that he would run for the District 12 seat in the Nebraska Legislature. The district, located in southern Douglas County, included the city of Ralston and much of its school district, as well as parts of Omaha's Millard neighborhood. Under Nebraska's term-limits law, incumbent Steve Lathrop was ineligible to run in the 2014 election.

==== 2014 primary ====
Three candidates entered the race. Riepe, a Republican, stated that he was particularly concerned about health-care issues, and opposed to the proposed expansion of Medicaid in Nebraska under the provisions of the 2010 Affordable Care Act. Greg Hosch, a Democrat, was the general manager of Horsemen's Park, an Omaha horse-racing track. He had never sought office before, but had lobbied for the racing industry's interests at the legislature. He stated that he had no fixed agenda, but would work for economic development in the district. Joseph Hering, who described himself as a moderate Republican and a fiscal conservative, was an inventory control specialist for the city of Omaha; he had not previously run for office, but had served an internship in the legislature in 1992 and 1993. He stated that his priorities included the passage of a voter-identification law.

In the nonpartisan primary election, Riepe received 2468 of the 4194 votes cast, or 58.8% of the total. Hosch came in second, with 1298 votes (30.9%); Hering received 428 votes (10.2%).

==== 2014 general election ====
As the top two vote-getters, Riepe and Hosch moved on to the general election. Each questioned whether the other would place the state's interests ahead of his industry's. Riepe suggested that Hosch might push a measure to allow betting on historical videotaped races at Nebraska's racetracks; the Legislature had voted to place such a measure on the 2014 ballot, but the Nebraska Supreme Court had found that aspects of the ballot measure violated provisions of Nebraska's constitution relating to referendums, and had ordered its removal. According to Riepe, the passage of such a measure would lead to decreased keno revenues for Ralston. Hosch, meanwhile, suggested that Riepe might be inclined to represent the interests of the health-care industry rather than those of the Nebraska taxpayer, should the two come into conflict.

Over the course of the entire campaign, Riepe raised nearly $84,000 and spent over $88,000. Major contributions included $3000 from the Nebraska Bankers State PAC, $3000 from the Nebraska Chamber of Commerce & Industry PAC, $1500 from the Associated General Contractors Highway Improvement PAC, and $1500 from the Nebraska Republican Party. Hosch raised $62,000, and spent nearly $66,000. Contributors included the Nebraska Horsemen & Benevolent Protective Association, which gave his campaign $7500; several other racing and casino organizations made smaller contributions. A number of labor organizations also contributed to his campaign: the United Transportation Union PAC gave $4000, two International Brotherhood of Electrical Workers locals gave $3750, Firefighters for Better Government gave $2000, and the Nebraska AFL–CIO gave $1300. The Nebraska Democratic Party gave Hosch over $2700, and the Nebraska Association of Trial Attorneys $2000. Several organizations contributed to both candidates: the Nebraska State Education Association PAC gave each campaign $1250; the Nebraska Realtors PAC gave Riepe $2500 and Hosch $500; and the Greater Omaha Chamber of Commerce PAC gave Riepe $2000 and Hosch $500.

Turnout for the general election was approximately double that for the primary. Riepe received 5622 of the 8789 votes cast, or 64% of the total; Hosch received 3167 votes, or 36%.

=== Legislative tenure ===
==== 2015 session ====
In the 2015 session of the legislature, Riepe was named to the Agriculture Committee; the General Affairs Committee; and the Health and Human Services Committee.

Among the "most significant" actions taken by the legislature in its 2015 session were three bills that passed over vetoes by governor Pete Ricketts. LB268 repealed the state's death penalty; LB623 reversed the state's previous policy of denying driver's licenses to people who were living illegally in the United States after being brought to the country as children, and who had been granted exemption from deportation under the Barack Obama administration's Deferred Action for Childhood Arrivals (DACA) program; and LB610 increased the tax on gasoline to pay for repairs to roads and bridges. Riepe voted against the death-penalty repeal, and to sustain Ricketts's veto of the measure; he voted against the passage of LB623, then to sustain the gubernatorial veto; and he abstained in the vote on the gas-tax increase, then voted to sustain the veto.

==== 2016 session ====
In its 2016 session, the Nebraska legislature passed three bills that Ricketts then vetoed. LB580 would have created an independent commission of citizens to draw new district maps following censuses; supporters described it as an attempt to de-politicize the redistricting process, while Ricketts maintained that the bill delegated the legislature's constitutional duty of redistricting to "an unelected and unaccountable board". Riepe was listed as "present and not voting" in the bill's 29–15–5 passage. Sponsor John Murante opted not to seek an override of the governor's veto.

A second vetoed bill, LB935, would have changed state audit procedures. The bill passed by a margin of 37–8–4; Riepe was among those voting against it. The bill was withdrawn without an attempt to override the veto; the state auditor agreed to work with the governor on a new version for the next year's session.

A third bill passed over Ricketts's veto. LB947 made DACA beneficiaries eligible for commercial and professional licenses in Nebraska. The bill passed the legislature on a vote of 33–11–5; the veto override passed 31–13–5. Riepe voted against the bill at its passage, and against the override of Ricketts's veto.

The legislature failed to pass LB10, greatly desired by the Republican Party, which would have restored Nebraska to a winner-take-all scheme of allocating its electoral votes in U.S. presidential elections, rather than continuing its practice of awarding the electoral vote for each congressional district to the candidate who received the most votes in that district. Supporters were unable to break a filibuster; in the 32–17 cloture motion, Riepe was among those who voted in favor of the bill.

==== 2022 session ====
Riepe abstained from voting on a motion to advance a bill that would ban abortions after six weeks of pregnancy, stating that he was concerned the bill might not give women enough time to know whether they are pregnant. He had previously filed a motion to amend the bill to a ban after 12 weeks. He cited his experience working as a hospital administrator as a key factor motivating his abstention, which effectively killed the bill.

== Electoral history ==
Nebraska's 12th Legislative District Election, 2022
Primary election
| Party | Candidate | Votes | % |
|---|---|---|---|
| Republican | Merv Riepe | 3,038 | 44.97 |
| Democratic | Robin Richards | 1,369 | 20.27 |
| Republican | Haile Kucera | 1,185 | 17.54 |
| Republican | Bob Borgeson | 1,163 | 17.22 |
| Total votes | | 6,755 | 100.00 |
General election
| Republican | Merv Riepe | 5,942 | 52.31 |
| Democratic | Robin Richards | 5,418 | 47.69 |
| Total votes | | 11,360 | 100.00 |
| Republican gain from Democratic | | | |
