= Jerry D. Miller =

American politician

Member of the Nebraska Legislature from the 37th district
- In office November 9, 1984 – January 4, 1989
- Preceded by: Martin Kahle
- Succeeded by: Doug Kristensen

Personal details
- Born: August 24, 1942 (age 83) Davenport, Nebraska
- Party: Democratic
- Children: 3 (Lindsey, Mart, Liza)
- Education: University of Nebraska–Lincoln (B.S.)
- Occupation: Farmer, wholesaler, seed retailer

Jerry D. Miller (born August 24, 1942) is a Democratic politician from Nebraska who served as a member of the Nebraska Legislature from the 37th district from 1984 to 1989.

== Early life ==
Miller as born in Davenport, Nebraska, in 1942, and graduated from Davenport Community School. He graduated from the University of Nebraska–Lincoln with his bachelor's degree in agricultural economics, and worked as a farmer and seed salesman. Miller owned the D-D-J Company, a wholesale distributor of farming equipment, and served on the Davenport School Board.

== Nebraska Legislature ==
In 1984, Miller challenged incumbent State Senator Martin Kahle for re-election in the 37th district, which included Buffalo, Franklin, Kearney, Nuckolls, and Webster counties. In the primary election, Kahle placed first by a wide margin, receiving 65 percent of the vote to Miller's 35 percent.

On October 2, 1984, a month prior to the election, Kahle died, leaving Miller unopposed in the general election. Kahle's name remained on the ballot, and Miller won the general election in a landslide, receiving 74 percent of the vote. Following the election, Governor Bob Kerrey, who had previously announced that he would not immediately appoint a replacement for Kahle, appointed Miller to serve out the remaining two months of Kahle's term after the election. Miller was sworn in on November 9, 1984.

Miller ran for re-election in 1988, and was challenged by Kearney County Attorney Doug Kristensen and souvenir company owner Nicholas Ponticello. In the primary election, Miller placed first over Kristensen, who won the support of the state Republican Party, receiving 51 percent of the vote to Kristensen's 47 percent and Ponticello's 2 percent. In the general election, Kristensen defeated Miller in a landslide, receiving 65 percent of the vote to Miller's 35 percent.
