= Richard Ely (Nebraska politician) =

American politician (1921–2017)

Member of the Nebraska Legislature from the 37th district
- In office January 6, 1967 – January 6, 1969
- Preceded by: Kenneth Bowen
- Succeeded by: Wayne Ziebarth

Personal details
- Born: September 15, 1921 Guide Rock, Nebraska
- Died: April 19, 2017 (aged 95) Red Cloud, Nebraska
- Party: Republican
- Spouse: Emeline Weeser (m. 1942, died)
- Children: 3 (Richard, Rodney, Keith)
- Education: University of Nebraska
- Occupation: Grain dealer

Military service
- Allegiance: United States
- Branch/service: United States Navy
- Years of service: 1944–1946

Richard Lewis Ely (September 15, 1921 – April 19, 2017) was a Republican politician from Nebraska who served as a member of the Nebraska Legislature from the 37th district from 1967 to 1969.

== Early life ==
Ely was born in Guide Rock, Nebraska, in 1921, and graduated from Guide Rock High School. He attended the University of Nebraska for three years and majored in electrical engineering, and joined the U.S. Navy during World War II in 1944, serving until 1946. Ely was a grain dealer in Guide Rock, and served on the Guide Rock School Board.

== Nebraska Legislature ==
In 1967, following the resignation of State Senator Kenneth Bowen, Governor Norbert Tiemann appointed Ely to serve out the remaining two years of Bowen's term. Ely was sworn in on January 6, 1967.

Ely ran for a full term in 1968, and he was challenged by Wayne Ziebarth, a farmer and member of the Midland College board of directors. In the primary election, Ely narrowly placed first, winning 52 percent of the vote to Ziebarth's 48 percent. In the general election, Ziebarth defeated Ely by a thin margin, receiving 51 percent of the vote to Ely's 49 percent.

== Post-legislative career ==
In 1976, when State Senator Gary Anderson, who succeeded Ziebarth in 1972, declined to seek re-election, Ely ran to succeed him in the 37th district. In the nonpartisan primary, Ely faced Kearney County Commissioner Martin Kahle and activist Frances Ohmstede. Ely placed second in the primary, receiving 35 percent of the vote to Kahle's 44 percent, and they advanced to the general election. Kahle defeated Ely, winning 54 percent of the vote to Ely's 46 percent.

== Death ==
Ely died on April 19, 2017.
