= George A. Knight =

American politician (1892–1963)

Member of the Nebraska Legislature from the 18th district
- In office January 3, 1961 – January 1, 1963
- Preceded by: Otto Liebers
- Succeeded by: Jerome Warner

Personal details
- Born: April 23, 1892 Butler County, Nebraska
- Died: December 14, 1963 (aged 71) Lincoln, Nebraska
- Party: Republican
- Spouse: Helen E. Gruver (m. 1916)
- Children: 4 (Dorothy, George, John, Charles)
- Occupation: Banker

George A. Knight (April 23, 1892 – December 14, 1963) was a Republican politician from Nebraska who served as a member of the Nebraska Legislature from the 18th district from 1961 to 1963.

== Early life ==
Knight was born in Butler County, Nebraska, in 1892. He graduated from Geneva High School and then from Nebraska Wesleyan University in 1914. Knight then attended graduate school at Northwestern University. Afterwards, he began working for the Citizens State Bank as a bookkeeper, and eventually became hte president of the bank.

In 1943, Governor Dwight Griswold appointed Knight to the Lancaster County Sanitary District, where he served alongside future Governor Victor Anderson. Knight ran for a four-year term on the board in 1944, and won the Republican primary and general election unopposed. He was re-elected in 1948, 1952, and 1956.

== Nebraska Legislature ==
State Senator Otto Liebers declined to run for re-election in 1960, and Knight ran to succeed him in the 18th district, which was based in Lincoln. He faced a crowded field of opponents in the nonpartisan primary: Jerome Warner, a farmer and son of former Lieutenant Governor Charles J. Warner; Ellsworth Nielsen, a union official; T. J. Thompson, a former dean at the University of Nebraska and former University Place City Councilman; and James Sellers, a former history professor. Though Warner was seen as the frontrunner, Knight placed first in the primary, winning 40 percent of the vote to Warner's 27 percent, and they advanced to the general election. In the general election, Knight defeated Warner, winning 54–46 percent.

Knight declined to seek re-election in 1962, noting: "For one who is actively engaged in a growing business, it is most difficult to be away from it for a legislative session lasting nearly 7 months."

== Death ==
Knight died on December 14, 1964.
