= John Beaver =

American politician (1896–1965)

Speaker of the Nebraska Legislature
- In office January 1, 1957 – January 6, 1959
- Preceded by: Dwight Burney
- Succeeded by: Harry Pizer

Member of the Nebraska Legislature from the 12th district
- In office January 2, 1951 – January 6, 1959
- Preceded by: George Weborg
- Succeeded by: Oliver Olinger

Personal details
- Born: August 27, 1896 Scribner, Nebraska
- Died: September 20, 1965 (aged 69) Columbus, Nebraska
- Party: Republican
- Spouse: Adele Hargens (m. 1922)
- Occupation: Merchant

John E. Beaver (August 27, 1896 – September 20, 1965) was a Republican politician from Nebraska who served as Speaker of the Nebraska Legislature from 1957 to 1959 and as a member of the Nebraska Legislature from the 12th district from 1951 to 1959.

== Early life ==
Beaver was born in Scribner, Nebraska, in 1896, and graduated from Scribner High School. He owned and operated a grocery store in Scribner, where he served as city treasurer and as treasurer of the school board, before moving to Beemer. Beaver was elected mayor of Beemer and resigned in 1949 to serve in the state legislature as the reader and docket clerk.

== Nebraska Legislature ==
In 1950, State Senator George Weborg declined to seek re-election, and Beaver ran to succeed him in the 12th district, which included Burt and Cuming counties. In the nonpartisan primary, he faced West Point Mayor William Hasebroock. Beaver received 4 more votes than Hasebroock in the primary, and they advanced to the general election. Beaver ultimately defeated Hasebroock, winning 54 percent of the vote to Hasebroock's 46 percent.

Beaver ran for re-election in 1952, and was re-elected unopposed. He ran for a third term in 1954, and was challenged by Steve Guinan, a businessman. He received 84 percent of the vote in the primary to Guinan's 16 percent, and defeated him in the general election with 72 percent of the vote.

In 1956, Beaver ran for re-election. He was challenged by Guinan and by attorney Fred Jack. In the primary election, Beaver placed first by a wide margin, winning 66 percent of the vote to Jack's 18 percent and Guinan's 15 percent. He and Jack advanced to the general election, which Beaver won in a landslide, defeating Jack, 65–35 percent.

Beaver ran for Speaker of the Legislature at the start of the 1957 session, and was elected, receiving 24 votes to Harry Pizer's 11, Otto Liebers's 5, and Otto Kotouc's 2 votes. Following the first ballot, Pizer moved to unanimously elect Beaver. He declined to seek re-election in 1958.

== Death ==
Beaver died on September 20, 1965.
