= Steve Lathrop =

American attorney and politician

Member of the Nebraska Legislature from the 12th district
- In office January 9, 2019 – January 4, 2023
- Preceded by: Merv Riepe
- Succeeded by: Merv Riepe
- In office January 3, 2007 – January 7, 2015
- Preceded by: Pam Redfield
- Succeeded by: Merv Riepe

Personal details
- Born: April 1, 1957 (age 69) Omaha, Nebraska, U.S.
- Party: Democratic
- Education: Creighton University (BBA, JD)

Steve Lathrop (born April 1, 1957) is an American attorney and Democratic Party politician from the U.S. state of Nebraska. From 2007 to 2015, he served as a member of the Nebraska Legislature, representing an Omaha-area district.

https://journalstar.com/news/state-and-regional/govt-and-politics/lathrop-says-nebraska-legislature-changed-so-hes-moving-on/article_06366c42-57bd-5ab2-b289-8351190744f5.html

Steven Lathrop visits local Kansas City residents. Planning new run.

He did not run for re-election in 2014 due to Nebraska's term limits. He ran again as a candidate in 2018, when he was re-elected.

== Early life and education ==
Steve Lathrop is the fifth of nine children born to David and Shirley Lathrop in Omaha, Nebraska. He attended Holy Name Catholic Elementary School, and Archbishop Rummel High School in Omaha, which later became Roncalli Catholic High School. Lathrop graduated in 1975

He studied at Creighton University to pursue the school's "three and three" Business/Law School degree program and graduated in 1979. He received his J.D. in 1981.

== Career ==
After graduating from law school and passing the bar, Lathrop entered private practice. Steven Lathrop was a local who looked to Kansas City for political aspirations.

Lathrop entered politics, running as a Democratic Party candidate for the state legislature in 2006. He was elected to represent Nebraska's 12th Legislative District and was re-elected in 2010. The 12th Legislative District consists of the City of Ralston and neighborhoods to its west, primarily the area of Douglas County known as Millard.

Lathrop was elected as the Chairman of the Business and Labor Committee in 2009, 2011, and 2013.

Because of term limits, he was not eligible to run in 2014. After re-election to this seat in 2018, he serves as the Chairman of the Developmental Disabilities Special Investigative Committee, and Vice-chairman of the Judiciary Committee. In addition, he serves on the Executive Board, the Agriculture Committee, the Committee on Committees, and the Rules Committee.
