= Minnie Y. and Frank P. Mattes House =

Historic house in Iowa, United States

- U.S. National Register of Historic Places
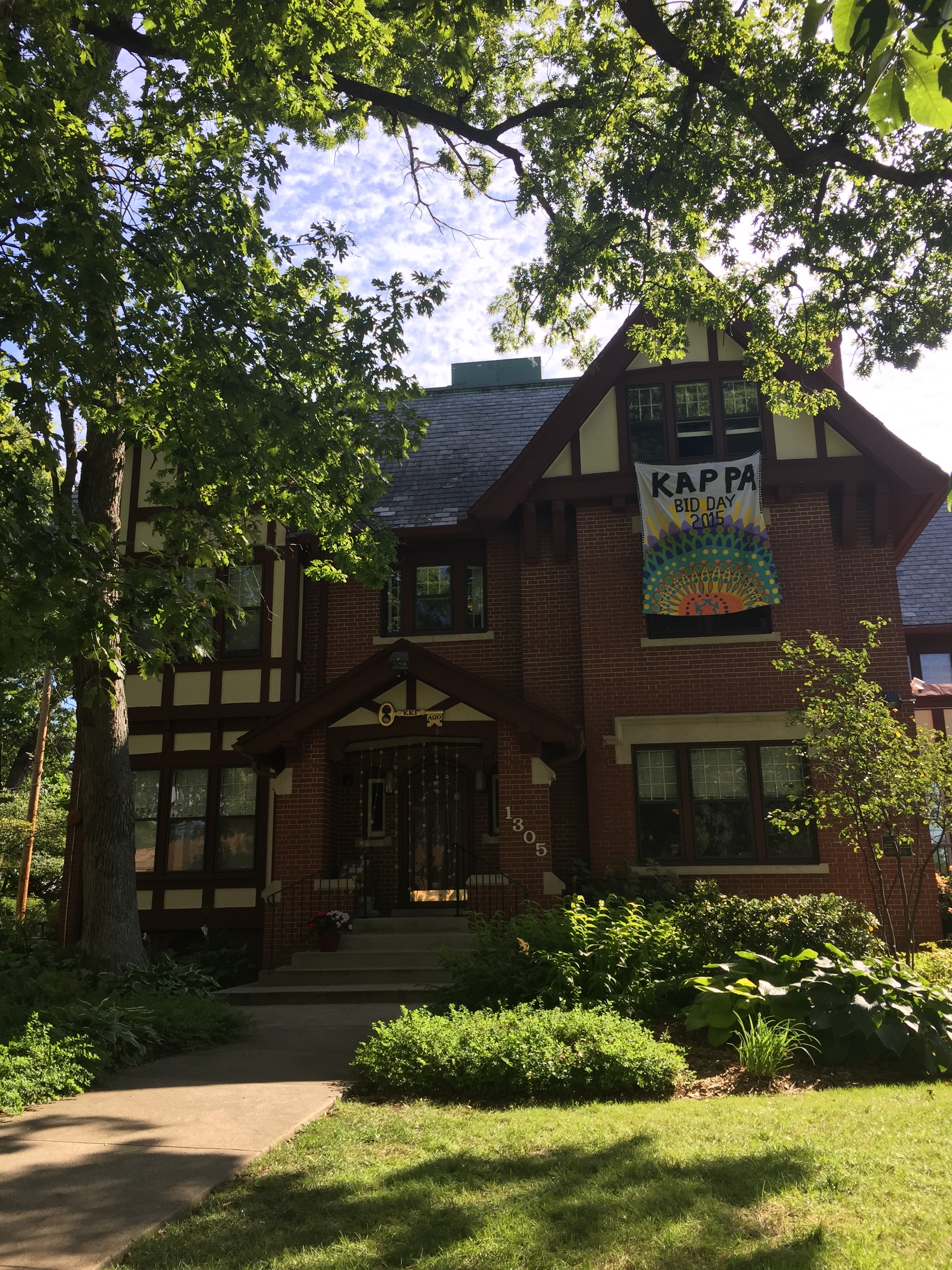

- Location within Iowa Location within the United States
- Location: 1305 34th St. Des Moines, Iowa
- Coordinates: 41°36′09.1″N 93°39′45.9″W
- Area: less than one acre
- Built: 1910
- Built by: Herbert & Frances Schmitz
- Architect: Proudfoot, Bird & Rawson
- Architectural style: Tudor Revival
- MPS: Architectural Legacy of Proudfoot & Bird in Iowa MPS
- NRHP reference No.: 09001090
- Added to NRHP: December 16, 2009

The Minnie Y. and Frank P. Mattes House is a historic building located in Des Moines, Iowa, United States. Its significance is attributed to its association with the prominent Des Moines architectural firm of Proudfoot, Bird & Rawson, and it calls attention to their residential work. The historic designation includes the large scale Tudor Revival house, automobile garage, and the retaining wall and entrance steps that were all constructed in 1910 for the Mattes. Both Frank and Minnie were from prominent Des Moines German-American families. He was a brewer until prohibition in the city, and he was then involved with real estate. The property was sold to Guy M. and Madeline Lambert in 1944, who sold it to the Drake University sorority Kappa Kappa Gamma in 1959. Other houses in the neighborhood were converted in a similar manner.

This is an early example of the Tudor Revival style in Des Moines, which would become the dominant architectural style in the city by the 1920s and 1930s. While the original single-family residence was completed in 1910, two additions were built onto it by the sorority in 1961 and in 1993. The house was listed on the National Register of Historic Places in 2009.
