= Wells Independent School District =

School district in Texas

Wells Independent School District is a public school district based in Wells, Texas (USA).

Located in southern Cherokee County, the district extends into a small portion of Angelina County.

Wells ISD has two campuses – Wells High School (Grades 7-12) and Wells Elementary (Grades PK-6).

In 2010, the school district was rated "recognized" by the Texas Education Agency.

Wells ISD is a member of the UIL and has a rich history in both boys' and girls' basketball teams. Both programs having made the state playoffs 7 times over the past 10 years. Additionally, Wells High School has an emerging baseball and softball programs.

In 2012 WISD residents voted to approve a $4,000,000.00 bond to construct a new HS, Basketball Coliseum and Administration wing.

Leadership at Wells ISD Superintendent= Jim Moore, High School Principal= Dr. Gary Applewhite, Elementary Principal= Blake Smith, Curriculum Director= Leslie Brown, Athletic Director= Chad Collins, Counselor= Kathy Ford, Business Manager= Jana O'Quinn, Chief of Maintenance= Mike Petty.
