= Doug Kristensen =

American politician

Chancellor of University of Nebraska at Kearney
- In office July 1, 2002 – May 31, 2024
- Preceded by: Gladys Styles Johnson
- Succeeded by: Neal Schnoor

Speaker of the Nebraska Legislature
- In office January 7, 1998 – June 30, 2002
- Preceded by: Ron Withem
- Succeeded by: Curt Bromm

Member of the Nebraska Legislature from the 37th district
- In office January 7, 1987 – June 30, 2002
- Preceded by: Jerry D. Miller
- Succeeded by: Joel T. Johnson

Personal details
- Born: January 4, 1955 (age 71) Kearney, Nebraska, US
- Party: Republican
- Spouse: Terri S. Harder
- Children: 2 (Morgan, Paige)
- Education: University of Nebraska–Lincoln (B.A.); Drake University Law School (J.D.)
- Occupation: Attorney, higher education administrator

Douglas A. Kristensen (born January 4, 1955) is a Republican politician and university administrator from Nebraska who served as Chancellor of University of Nebraska at Kearney from 2002 to 2024, as Speaker of the Nebraska Legislature from 1998 to 2002, and as a member of the Nebraska Legislature from the 37th district from 1987 to 2002.

== Early life ==
Kristensen was born in Kearney, Nebraska, in 1955, and grew up in Minden. He graduated from Minden High School in 1973, and then attended the University of Nebraska–Lincoln, receiving his bachelor's degree in economics and political science in 1977. Kristensen then attended the Drake University Law School, graduating in 1980.

In 1982, Kristensen ran for Kearney County Attorney. He defeated Rebecca Miller in the Republican primary, receiving 833 votes to Miller's 459 votes. In the general election, Kristensen defeated Democratic nominee David Wondra in a landslide, winning 64 percent of the vote to Wondra's 36 percent. He was re-elected without opposition in 1986.

== Nebraska Legislature ==
Kristensen ran for the state legislature in 1988, challenging Democratic State Senator Jerry D. Miller for re-election in the 37th district, which was based in Buffalo, Franklin, Kearney, Nuckolls, and Webster counties. Kristensen faced Miller and souvenir shop owner Nicholas Ponticello in the nonpartisan primary, and was supported by the state Republican Party. Kristensen narrowly placed second in the primary, winning 47 percent of the vote to Miller's 51 percent and Ponticello's 2 percent. Kristensen and Miller advanced to the general election, where Kristensen defeated Miller by a wide margin, winning 65–35 percent.

In 1992, Kristensen ran for re-election, and was chalelnged by Ponticello. Kristensen placed first over Ponticello in the primary election, winning 87 percent of the vote to Ponticello's 13 percent. He won the general election by the same margin, defeating Ponticello, 87–13 percent.

Kristensen was re-elected to a third 1996 without opposition. In 1997, Speaker Ron Withem resigned from the legislature, and Kristensen ran to succeed him. He ultimately defeated State Senator David Landis by a 26–21 vote.

In 1999, Kristensen was re-elected as Speaker without opposition. He ran for a fourth term in 2000, and was re-elected unopposed, and was re-elected Speaker without opposition in 2001.

== University of Nebraska at Kearney ==
Kristensen applied to serve as the Chancellor of the University of Nebraska at Kearney in 2002. Despite concerns about his inexperience as a university administrator, he was named as the next chancellor by L. Dennis Smith, the president of the University of Nebraska system. He was apparoved by the University of Nebraska Board of Regents on June 1, 2002, by a 7–1 vote. Kristensen resigned from the legislature, effective June 30, 2002, and was sworn in as Chancellor on July 1, 2002.

In 2023, Kristensen announced that he would step down as Chancellor effective on July 1, 2024, stating that "now is the right time for me to step away and allow a new leader to carry on UNK’s vital work in providing education and economic development for central and western Nebraska."
