= John Mattes (politician) =

American politician

John Mattes Jr.

29th President pro tempore of the Nebraska Senate
- In office January 1917 – January 1919
- Preceded by: Phillip H. Kohl
- Succeeded by: Berton Kenyon Bushee

Personal details
- Born: 1856 Nendingen, Württemberg, Germany
- Died: Unknown
- Occupation: Brewer

John Mattes (born 1856) was a member of the Nebraska Legislature and brewer in Nebraska City, Nebraska, in the United States.

Mattes was born in Nendingen, Kingdom of Württemberg. He emigrated with his family from Burlington (1864) and Brookfield (1866) to Des Moines, Iowa, in 1876. There, his uncles Paul and John founded the "Mattes Brewery" where he became a partner in 1886.

Living in Nebraska City he was mayor, member of the House of Representatives and Senate of Nebraska for Otoe County. He fought strictly against female suffrage. Under President Cleveland, he was an agent of the Department of Agriculture.

In 1906, he renamed the brewery "Otoe Brewing Co." With Nebraska State prohibition, the brewery was closed in 1917.

From 1917 to 1918, he was President pro tem of the senate.

== Family ==
Paul Mattes had seven children: Frank P., Mary, Pauline, Rosa, Hoyt, Francis and Lotte. Frank was general agent of the Moerlein Brewery, Cincinnati, Ohio. John Mattes married Katie Schaefer in Des Moines. They had a daughter, Nora Angeline (1883).
