= Harry Chronister =

American politician (1922–2006)

Member of the Nebraska Legislature from the 18th district
- In office June 22, 1979 – January 7, 1987
- Preceded by: William Hasebroock
- Succeeded by: Stan Schellpeper

Personal details
- Born: September 30, 1922 Schuyler, Nebraska
- Died: September 16, 2006 (aged 83) Schuyler, Nebraska
- Party: Republican
- Spouse: Katherine Coufal (m. 1946)
- Children: 3 (Mary, Mark, Janet)
- Education: Spartan College of Aeronautics and Technology
- Occupation: Agribusiness, flight instructor

Harry Chronister (September 30, 1922 – September 16, 2006) was a Republican politician from Nebraska who served as a member of the Nebraska Legislature from the 18th district from 1979 to 1987.

== Early career ==
Chorister was born in Schuyler, Nebraska, and graduated from Schuyler High School. He attended the Spartan College of Aeronautics and Technology and worked as a flight instructor, and was elected to the Schuyler City Council and on the city school board.

== Nebraska Legislature ==
In 1979, State Senator William Hasebroock died, and Governor Charles Thone appointed Chronister to serve until a special election could be held in 1980, passing over Hasebroock's widow, who requested the appointment. He was sworn in on June 22, 1979.

Chronister ran to serve out the remaining two years of Hasebroock's term in 1980, and was challenged by Schuyler Mayor Jeffrey Pokorny, former Stanton County Sheriff Emil Christensen, and write-in candidate Ron Tuma, a farmer. Chorister placed first in the primary, receiving 37 percent of the vote to Pokorny's 34 percent, and both advanced to the general election. Chronister narrowly defeated Pokorny, winning 51–49 percent.

In 1982, Chronister ran for re-election to a full term. He was challenged by Pokorny, in a rematch of their 1980 race, and disbarred attorney Ken Michaelis. Chronister placed first in the primary by a wide margin, receiving 56 percent of the vote to Pokorny's 25 percent and Michaelis's 19 percent. Chronister and Pokorny advanced to the general election again, where Chronister won in a landslide, receiving 61 percent of the vote to Pokorny's 39 percent.

Chronister declined to seek re-election in 1986.

== Death ==
Chorister died on September 16, 2006.
