= Wells, Texas =

- Town
- Nickname: "The city between two rivers"
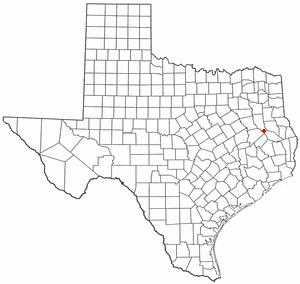
- Location of Wells, Texas

- Coordinates: 31°29′45″N 94°56′55″W
- Country: United States
- State: Texas
- County: Cherokee

Area
  - Total: 1.92 sq mi (4.96 km^{2})
  - Land: 1.92 sq mi (4.96 km^{2})
  - Water: 0 sq mi (0.00 km^{2})
- Elevation: 331 ft (101 m)

Population (2020)
  - Total: 853
  - Density: 413.5/sq mi (159.67/km^{2})
- Time zone: UTC-6 (Central (CST))
  - Summer (DST): UTC-5 (CDT)
- ZIP code: 75976
- Area code: 936
- FIPS code: 48-77176
- GNIS feature ID: 2413465
- Website: cityofwells.us

Wells is a town in Cherokee County, Texas, United States. The population was 790 at the 2010 census, and 853 at the 2020 U.S. census.

== History ==
Wells is at the junction of U.S. Highway 69 and Farm to Market Road 1247, twenty-three miles south of Rusk in extreme southern Cherokee County. It was established in 1885 as a stop on the newly constructed Kansas and Gulf Short Line Railroad and was named for Maj. E. H. Wells, a civil engineer for the railroad. A post office opened in 1886, and by 1890 the town had a sawmill, a hotel, a Methodist church, three general stores, and a population of fifty. Shortly after the railroad was completed, the state penitentiary established a satellite camp just outside the town to produce charcoal for the state-run iron works at Rusk. The presence of the prison camp discouraged many potential settlers, and the town's population remained small until after 1900, when the charcoal camp was closed. During the 1910s, however, the town boomed; the First State Bank of Wells opened in 1913, and the following year the population reached 300. During the 1920s the community incorporated, and in 1936 Wells reported 475 residents and twenty businesses. The population continued to grow after World War II, rising to 761 by 1990. Over the same period, however, the number of businesses has gradually declined, falling from twenty-six in 1952 to seven in 1990. Farming, cattle ranching, and lumber are the principal industries.

== Geography ==
Wells is in the southernmost tip of Cherokee County in East Texas, approximately 65 miles (105 km) south of Tyler and 17 miles (27 km) north of Lufkin on U.S. 69. Nacogdoches is 20 miles (32 km) northeast, Dallas is 165.84 miles (266.89 km) to the north and west, while Houston is 137.51 miles (221.30 km) to the south and west.

According to the United States Census Bureau, the town has a total area of 2.0 square miles (5.2 km^{2}), all land.

== Demographics ==
Historical population
Census	Pop.	Note	%±
1930	475		—
1940	696		46.5%
1950	718		3.2%
1960	544		−24.2%
1970	671		23.3%
1980	926		38.0%
1990	761		−17.8%
2000	769		1.1%
2010	790		2.7%
2020	853		8.0%
U.S. Decennial Census

Wells racial composition as of 2020 (NH = Non-Hispanic) (Note: Note: the US Census treats Hispanic/Latino as an ethnic category. This table excludes Latinos from the racial categories and assigns them to a separate category. Hispanics/Latinos can be of any race.)
Race	Number	Percentage
White (NH)	621	72.8%
Black or African American (NH)	111	13.01%
Asian (NH)	3	0.35%
Pacific Islander (NH)	1	0.12%
Mixed/Multi-Racial (NH)	50	5.86%
Hispanic or Latino	67	7.85%
Total	853	

As of the 2020 United States census, there were 853 people, 264 households, and 224 families residing in the town, up from 769 in 2000 and 790 at the 2010 census. The racial and ethnic makeup of the town in 2000 was 72.43% White, 18.73% African American, 0.26% Native American, 6.50% from other races, and 2.08% from two or more races. Hispanic or Latino Americans of any race were 9.10% of the population.

== Education ==
Lack of transportation forced most children to walk to school, so for that reason small schoolhouses were scattered at five-mile (8 km) intervals throughout Cherokee county. Approximately 50 of these schoolhouses existed in the county in the 1870s. These schools were usually located in a church or a one-room building. Many of these small community schools sprang up near saw mills and other operations. The earliest schools in the Wells vicinity were at Shook's Bluff, Mt. Hope, Pleasant Hill, Damascus, Forest and Sweet Union communities. In 1884, boundaries were redrawn and 69 new school districts were formed in Cherokee County.

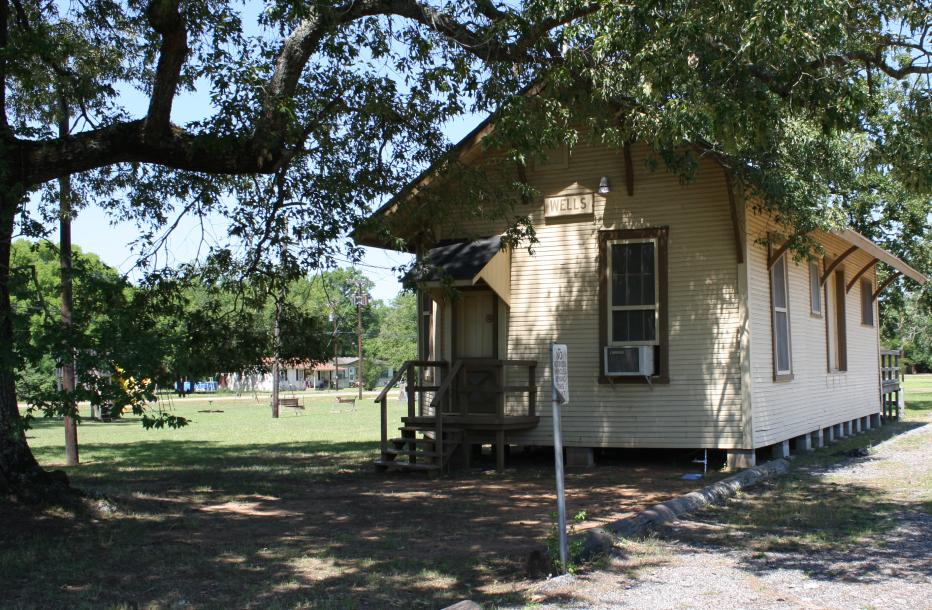
Historic railroad depot in Wells, Texas

The Shook's Bluff school, located near Shook's Bluff Cemetery, was operating in 1861. It was a crude, one-room, unpainted building. By 1920 people began to move away from the Neches River communities and closer to Wells, so the Shook's Bluff school was relocated two miles (3 km) west of Wells. Three teachers employed at that school were Vinnie Solley, Nora McClain, and Effie Wesley. Shook's Bluff school finally consolidated with Wells school in 1928.

Forest School was established in 1888 in the Forest Baptist Church, and later occupied a separate building on a lot donated by J. S. Derrough, Jeff Latham, and Hugh Henry. In 1922, Forest School consolidated with the Wildhurst School from the Chronister Lumber Company Camp and a new building was built on the old Jim Hogg Highway north of the Baptist Church in Forest. The new building housed the elementary and three unaccredited high school grades. Forest School consolidated with Wells ISD in 1949.

There were two Mt. Hope Methodist church schools. The first school was established in 1875 and the first teachers were H.S.P. Espie and John Clifford. The other Mt. Hope school consisted of a single 20 x 20 room and all grades were taught by one teacher. Classes were held for three months in the winter and during two summer sessions. Nathan Fulton, the first teacher, was paid $40 a month for his services. Other teachers were Jasper Starling, Asilee Hyde, Charlie Bowden, Quarles McClure, and George B. Terrell.

When Wells began to prosper as a result of the Kansas and Gulf Short Line Railroad reaching the town in 1885, the Mt. Hope school was moved to the Methodist church in town. Classes later moved to a two-story brick building on the present school site. That building burned in 1917 and was replaced by a similar structure build on the original faulty foundation. When a crack appeared in the back wall a few years later, the school was reduced to a single story. At about that time, Damascus and Crossroads schools consolidated with Wells and three high school grades were added.

Wells Independent School District was formed on June 12, 1921. The first school trustees were W. D. Lewis, Jr., Rube Sessions, W. T. Hunt, R. N. Falvey, T.B. Warner, J. W. Ellerbee, and Steve Cherry. The first superintendent was Hugh Stegall. The federal census showed Wells with a population of 475 when the first four-year high school class graduated in 1930. The school was accredited by the Texas Education Agency in 1934.

As transportation facilities continued to improve, all the county's small school districts were gradually absorbed into the five school districts that exist today: Wells, Alto, Rusk, Jacksonville, and New Summerfield.

== See also ==
- Church of Wells
