= List of speakers of the Nebraska Legislature =

Speaker of the Legislature of Nebraska
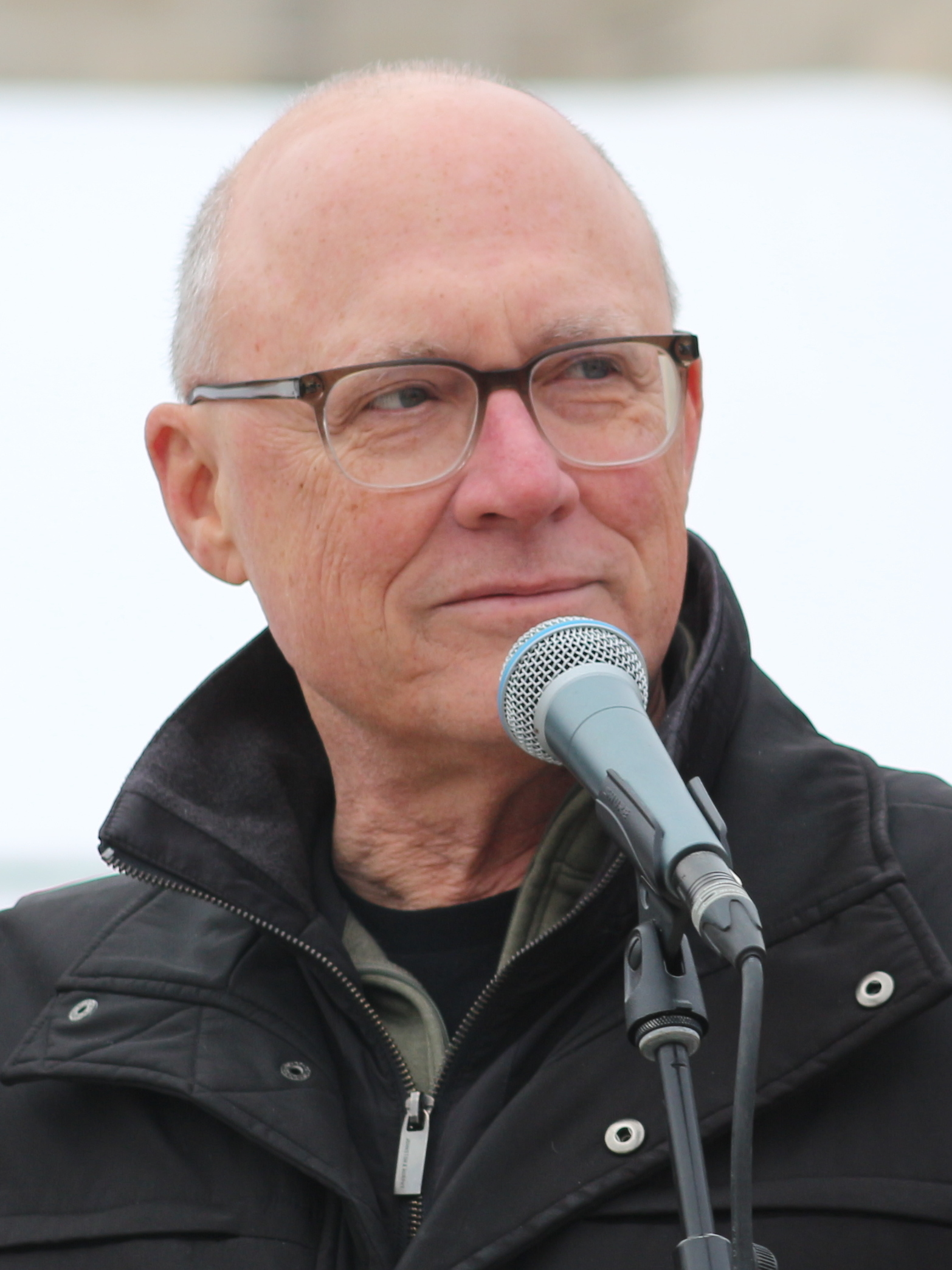
- Incumbent; John Arch since January 4, 2023
- Type: Speaker
- Member of: Nebraska Legislature
- Term length: Two years
- Formation: 1937
- First holder: Charles J. Warner
- Succession: Second

The speaker of the Nebraska Legislature is the highest-ranking officer elected from among the membership of the Nebraska Legislature. The speaker presides over the body in the absence of the lieutenant governor. The speaker is generally recognized to be the parliamentary leader of the Nebraska Legislature and, with the approval of the executive board, determines the legislative agenda (the order in which bills and resolutions are considered). The speaker has the privilege of speaking at any stage of the legislature's proceedings in accordance with their responsibilities as speaker.

The speaker is second in line to become the Governor of Nebraska if both the offices of governor and lieutenant governor become simultaneously vacant.

Before the creation of this office, Nebraska had a bicameral legislature, and the leaders of the upper and lower houses were, respectively, the president pro tempore of the Nebraska Senate and the speaker of the Nebraska House of Representatives.

== List ==
The following is a list of the speakers of the Nebraska Legislature since it became a unicameral body in 1937.

#	Image	Name	Party (Note: Although Nebraska state senators are elected on a nonpartisan basis, party affiliations during the time each individual served as speaker are listed here when known.)	Tenure	District (Note: Many, but not all, of the Nebraska legislative districts were renumbered in 1964. The current number of the district is listed for all speakers, but if the speaker served prior to 1964, the district number at the time they served is listed in parentheses if it was different.)	City of residence	Notes
1		Charles J. Warner	Rep	1937–1938	25 (18)	Waverly	Later served as Lieutenant Governor of Nebraska; Father of Jerome Warner, the 18th Speaker; Served during a vacancy in the office of lieutenant governor from June 26 to Nov. 8, 1938
2		William Diers	Dem	1939–1940	24	Gresham	
3		Rufus Howard	Rep	1941–1942	44 (39)	Sutherland	
4		Robert B. Crosby	Rep	1943–1944	45 (38)	North Platte	Later served as Lieutenant Governor and Governor of Nebraska
5		C. Petrus Peterson	Rep	1945–1946	29 (20)	Lincoln	
6		Walter Raecke	Dem	1947–1948	35 (30)	Central City	
7		Earl J. Lee	Rep	1949–1950	15 (11)	Fremont	
8		Ed Hoyt	Rep	1951–1952	38 (33)	McCook	Resigned as senator to accept appointment of Gov. Robert Crosby as assistant agriculture director
9		Otto Prohs	Rep	1952	48 (42)	Gering	Selected to finish the term of Speaker Hoyt
10		Charles Tvrdik	Dem	1953–1954	7	Omaha	
11		Dwight Burney	Rep	1955–1956	19 (14)	Hartington	Later served as Lieutenant Governor and Governor of Nebraska; Served during a vacancy in the office of lieutenant governor from Sep. 24, 1955, to Jan. 1, 1957
12		John Beaver	Rep	1957–1958	16 (12)	Beemer	
13		Harry Pizer	Rep	1959–1960	45 (38)	North Platte	Served during a vacancy in the office of lieutenant governor from Sep. 9, 1960, to Jan. 3, 1961
14		Donald Thompson	Rep	1961–1962	38 (33)	McCook	
15		Bill Moulton	Rep	1963–1964	8 (10)	Omaha	
16		Kenneth Bowen	Rep	1965–1966	37	Red Cloud	
17		Elvin Adamson	Rep	1967–1968	43	Valentine	
18		Jerome Warner	Rep	1969–1970	25	Waverly	Son of Charles J. Warner, the first speaker
19		William Hasebroock	Rep	1971–1972	18	West Point	
20		Richard Proud	Rep	1973–1974	12	Omaha	
21		Jules Burbach	Dem	1975–1976	19	Hartington	
22		Roland Luedtke	Rep	1977–1978	28	Lincoln	Later served as Lieutenant Governor of Nebraska
23		Richard Marvel	Rep	1979–1982	33	Hastings	
24		William E. Nichol	Rep	1983–1986	48	Scottsbluff	Later served as Lieutenant Governor of Nebraska
25		Bill Barrett	Rep	1987–1990	39	Lexington	Later served as a U.S. representative
26		Dennis Baack	Rep	1991–1993	47	Kimball	Resigned as senator to become the executive director of the Nebraska Community College Association
27		Ron Withem	Dem	1994–1997	14	Papillion	Elected to finish the term of Speaker Baack
28		Doug Kristensen	Rep	1998–2002	37	Minden	Later became chancellor of the University of Nebraska at Kearney
29		Curt Bromm	Rep	2002–2004	23	Wahoo	
30		Kermit Brashear	Rep	2005–2006	4	Omaha	Served during a vacancy in the office of lieutenant governor from Jan. 20 to Jan. 24, 2005
31		Mike Flood	Rep	2007–2012	19	Norfolk	Later became a U.S. representative
32		Greg L. Adams	Rep	2013–2014	24	York	Served during two vacancies in the office of lieutenant governor from Feb. 2 to Feb. 13, 2013, and from Sep. 9 to Sep. 29, 2014
33		Galen Hadley	Rep	2015–2016	37	Kearney	
34		Jim Scheer	Rep	2017–2020	19	Norfolk	
35		Mike Hilgers	Rep	2021–2022	21	Lincoln	Later became the Nebraska Attorney General
36		John Arch	Rep	2023–Present	14	La Vista	

== See also ==
- List of Nebraska state legislatures
