= Nebraska Senate =

Defunct upper house in Nebraska (1854–1936)

- Nebraska Legislature

Type
- Type: Upper house

History
- Established: 1854
- Disbanded: 1936
- Succeeded by: Nebraska Legislature

Leadership
- First Territorial President: Joseph L. Sharp
- First President: Frank Welch

Structure
- Seats: 13 (1854–1875); 30 (1876–1880); 33 (1881–1936)
- Length of term: 2 years
- Authority: Article III, Nebraska Constitution (pre-1936)
- Salary: $800/year (1936)

Meeting place
- East Chamber, Nebraska State Capitol; Omaha (1854–1867); Lincoln (1867–1936)

The Nebraska Senate was the upper house of the Nebraska Legislature during the days when Nebraska was a territory from 1854 to 1867 (when it was called the Nebraska Territorial Council) and then again when Nebraska was a state from 1867 until 1936. In 1934, Nebraska voters amended the Nebraska Constitution to reconfigure the Nebraska Legislature to a unicameral system. This system became effective for the 1937 legislative session. Beginning as a territorial upper house in 1854, it had 13 members; this number was raised to 30 members when the second state constitution was adopted in 1875. In 1881, the Senate increased to 33 members, and although a later constitutional amendment allowed it to increase to 50 members, it remained at 33 members until it was abolished in 1936. The last senators of the bicameral legislature were elected to a two-year term in 1934 and began their service with the final legislative session in 1935.

== See also ==
- List of presidents pro tempore of the Nebraska Senate
