= Prairie Creek Township, Nebraska =

Prairie Creek Township, Nebraska may refer to the following places:

- Prairie Creek Township, Merrick County, Nebraska
- Prairie Creek Township, Hall County, Nebraska
- Prairie Creek Township, Nance County, Nebraska

See also

- Prairie Creek Township (disambiguation)
