= National Register of Historic Places listings in Hall County, Nebraska =

Location of Hall County in Nebraska

Hall County, Nebraska, United States, has 29 properties and districts listed on the National Register of Historic Places.

The locations of National Register properties and districts for which the latitude and longitude coordinates are included below may be seen in a map.

This National Park Service list is complete through NPS recent listings posted October 30, 2026.

== Current listings ==
	Name on the Register	Image	Date listed	Location	City or town	Description
1	4th Street Commercial Historic District	4th Street Commercial Historic District	July 1, 2019 (#100004141)	Roughly bounded by alley S of 5th St., N. Sycamore St., Union Pacific RR Tracks, and N. Cedar St. 40°55′39″N 98°20′38″W	Grand Island	
2	H.J. Bartenbach House	H.J. Bartenbach House	December 8, 1986 (#86003385)	720 W. Division; 40°55′13″N 98°20′43″W	Grand Island	
3	Burlington Railroad Depot	Burlington Railroad Depot	December 2, 2014 (#14001013)	603 N. Plum St. 40°55′57″N 98°20′16″W	Grand Island	
4	Cathedral of the Nativity of the Blessed Virgin Mary	Cathedral of the Nativity of the Blessed Virgin Mary	July 15, 1982 (#82003189)	204 S. Cedar St. 40°55′16″N 98°20′32″W	Grand Island	
5	Erma's Desire	Erma's Desire	July 7, 2026 (#100012974)	Grand Island Rest Area Eastbound, Interstate 80, MM 314.93; 40°49′23″N 98°19′35″W	Grand Island	
6	Evangelische Lutherische Dreienigkeit Kirche	Evangelische Lutherische Dreienigkeit Kirche	December 1, 1986 (#86003378)	512 E. 2nd St. 40°55′38″N 98°20′04″W	Grand Island	
7	Heinrich Giese House	Heinrich Giese House	July 26, 2006 (#06000641)	2226 S. Blaine; 40°53′59″N 98°21′55″W	Grand Island	
8	Glade-Donald House	Glade-Donald House	September 12, 1985 (#85002140)	1004 W. Division; 40°55′09″N 98°20′53″W	Grand Island	
9	Gloe Brothers Service Station	Gloe Brothers Service Station	July 5, 2000 (#00000768)	609 E. 11th St. 40°49′20″N 98°35′38″W	Wood River	
10	Grand Island Carnegie Library	Grand Island Carnegie Library	May 2, 1975 (#75001094)	321 W. 2nd St. 40°55′25″N 98°20′30″W	Grand Island	
11	Grand Island FCC Monitoring Station	Grand Island FCC Monitoring Station	January 16, 1973 (#73001064)	609 N. Monitor Road; 40°55′33″N 98°26′08″W	Grand Island	
12	Grand Island Historic District		December 13, 2017 (#100001800)	Multiple; 40°55′32″N 98°20′28″W	Grand Island	
13	Grand Island Senior High School	Grand Island Senior High School	November 22, 1999 (#99001390)	504 Elm St. 40°55′44″N 98°21′01″W	Grand Island	
14	Grand Island United States Post Office and Courthouse	Grand Island United States Post Office and Courthouse	February 14, 2006 (#06000044)	203 W. 2nd St. 40°55′27″N 98°20′25″W	Grand Island	
15	Grand Island VA Hospital	Grand Island VA Hospital	July 13, 2018 (#100002664)	2201 N Broadwell Ave. 40°56′35″N 98°21′25″W	Grand Island	
16	Hall County Courthouse	Hall County Courthouse	September 15, 1977 (#77000831)	1st and Locust; 40°55′25″N 98°20′20″W	Grand Island	
17	Hamilton-Donald House	Hamilton-Donald House	March 13, 1986 (#86000390)	820 W. 2nd St. 40°55′18″N 98°20′52″W	Grand Island	
18	Andrew M. Hargis House	Andrew M. Hargis House	June 9, 1978 (#78001700)	1109 W. 2nd St. 40°55′13″N 98°21′00″W	Grand Island	
19	The Hotel Yancey	The Hotel Yancey	December 13, 1984 (#84000504)	123 N. Locust St. 40°55′28″N 98°20′23″W	Grand Island	
20	Lee Huff Apartment Complex	Lee Huff Apartment Complex	July 1, 1994 (#94000652)	213-215½ S. Walnut St., 324 W. Koenig St., and 316-318½ W. Koenig St. 40°55′16″N 98°20′25″W	Grand Island	
21	Liederkranz	Liederkranz	November 30, 1978 (#78001701)	401 W. 1st St. 40°55′21″N 98°20′30″W	Grand Island	
22	Lincoln Highway-Grand Island Seedling Mile	Lincoln Highway-Grand Island Seedling Mile	April 24, 2013 (#13000198)	Seedling Mile Rd. 40°55′51″N 98°19′27″W	Grand Island	
23	Nine Bridges Bridge	Nine Bridges Bridge	June 29, 1992 (#92000716)	Private road over the Middle Channel of the Platte River, 3.9 miles north of Doniphan; 40°49′40″N 98°22′47″W	Doniphan	
24	Oscar Roeser House	Oscar Roeser House	June 25, 1982 (#82003190)	721 W. Koenig St. 40°55′09″N 98°20′40″W	Grand Island	
25	Shady Bend Gas Station, Grocery, and Diner	Shady Bend Gas Station, Grocery, and Diner	July 2, 2008 (#08000601)	3609 E. U.S. Route 30; 40°56′19″N 98°18′03″W	Grand Island	
26	Soldiers and Sailors Home	Soldiers and Sailors Home	March 1, 2021 (#100006191)	2300 West Capital Ave. 40°56′46″N 98°22′03″W	Grand Island	
27	Stolley Homestead Site	Stolley Homestead Site	March 16, 1972 (#72001584)	Stolley Park; 40°54′02″N 98°21′33″W	Grand Island	
28	Stuhr Museum of the Prairie Pioneer	Stuhr Museum of the Prairie Pioneer	June 29, 2015 (#15000396)	3133 US 34; 40°53′02″N 98°22′24″W	Grand Island	
29	Townsley-Murdock Immigrant Trail Site	Townsley-Murdock Immigrant Trail Site	March 5, 1998 (#98000194)	Approximately 1.5 miles south of Alda; 40°50′42″N 98°28′27″W	Alda	

== See also ==
- List of National Historic Landmarks in Nebraska
- National Register of Historic Places listings in Nebraska
