= Prairie Creek Township =

Prairie Creek Township may refer to:

- Prairie Creek Township, Logan County, Illinois
- Prairie Creek Township, Vigo County, Indiana
- Prairie Creek Township, Dubuque County, Iowa, in Dubuque County, Iowa
- Prairie Creek Township, Merrick County, Nebraska
- Prairie Creek Township, Hall County, Nebraska
- Prairie Creek Township, Nance County, Nebraska
