= Alva Johnston (politician) =

American politician (1872–1953)

Member of the Nebraska Legislature from the 30th district
- In office January 3, 1939 – January 7, 1941
- Preceded by: John Knickrehm
- Succeeded by: Walter R. Raecke

Member of the Nebraska House of Representatives from the 68th district
- In office January 1, 1935 – January 5, 1937
- Preceded by: E. E. Binfield
- Succeeded by: Position abolished

Personal details
- Born: January 15, 1872 Frost, Ohio
- Died: October 22, 1953 (aged 81) Grand Island, Nebraska
- Party: Republican
- Spouse: Viola H. Martin (m. 1901)
- Children: 2
- Education: Grand Island Business College
- Occupation: Farmer

Alva M. Johnston (January 15, 1872 – October 22, 1953) was a Republican politician from Nebraska who served as a member of the Nebraska House of Representatives from the 68th district from 1935 to 1937 and as a member of the Nebraska Legislature from the 30th district from 1939 to 1941.

== Early life ==
Johnston was born in Frost, Ohio, in 1872, and moved to Nebraska in 1888. He attended Grand Island Business College and worked as a farmer. Johnston settled in Doniphan, where he served on the township board.

== Nebraska House of Representatives ==
In 1934, Johnston ran for the Nebraska House of Representatives from the 68th district. He won the Republican primary over Wood River Township Board member Max Bly and South Platte Township Clerk F. L. Adams, receiving 44 percent of the vote to Bly's 32 percent and Adams's 24 percent. In the general election, he narrowly defeated the Democratic nominee, Edward Batie, receiving 50.5 percent of the vote to Batie's 49.5 percent, a margin of 37 votes.

== Nebraska Legislature ==
Johnston ran for the Nebraska Legislature in 1938 from the 30th district, challenging incumbent State Senator John Knickrehm for re-election. He was joined in the nonpartisan primary by Merrick County Attorney Paul Morris and Spanish–American War veteran Sam Elder. Johnston narrowly placed first in the primary, receiving 31 percent of the vote and 33 more votes than Knickrehm. In the general election, Johnston defeated Knickrehm by a wide margin, winning 66 percent of the vote.

In 1940, Johnston ran for re-election, and was challenged by former Merrick County Attorney Walter R. Raecke, former State Representative Ray Higgins, former State Senator Archie O'Brien, grocer Oscar Roeser, and John Wagoner. Johnston placed fourth in the primary, receiving 14 percent of the vote to Raecke's 28 percent, Roeser's 21 percent, and O'Brien's 17 percent, the only incumbent state legislator to lose renomination that year.

== Death ==
Johnston died on October 22, 1953.
