= Senator Hoyt =

Senator Hoyt may refer to:

- Ed Hoyt (1900–1972), Nebraska State Senate
- George E. Hoyt (1861–1953), Wisconsin State Senate
- Heusted W. R. Hoyt (1842–1894), Connecticut State Senate
- James Henry Hoyt (1809–1873), Connecticut State Senate
- Joseph W. Hoyt (1840–1902), Wisconsin State Senate
- Oliver Hoyt (1823–1887), Connecticut State Senate
