= Abbott, Nebraska =

Unincorporated community in Nebraska, United States

Abbot, Nebraska
- Unincorporated community
- Location within Nebraska Location within the United States
- Coordinates: 40°58′29″N 98°28′53″W
- Country: United States
- State: Nebraska
- County: Hall
- Township: Prairie Creek

Abbott is an unincorporated community in Prairie Creek Township, Hall County, Nebraska, United States.

== History ==
A post office was established in Abbott in 1887, and remained in operation until it was discontinued in 1937. The community was named for Othman A. Abbott, the first lieutenant governor of Nebraska. In 1938, Abbott had about 75 inhabitants. Abbott was located on the Burlington railroad.
