= Hamilton-Donald House =

- Hamilton--Donald House
- U.S. National Register of Historic Places
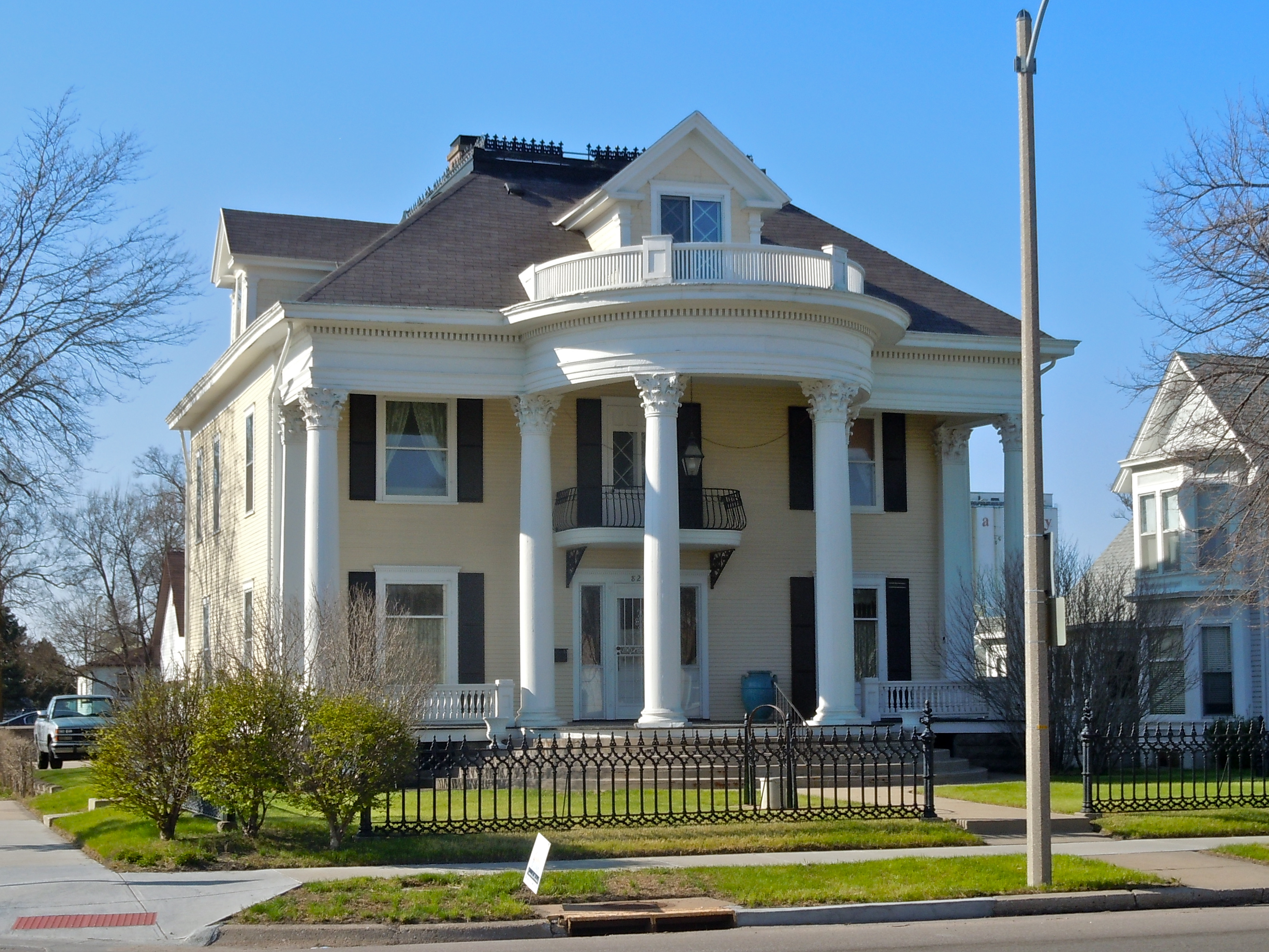
- The house in 2011

- Location within Nebraska Location within the United States
- Location: 820 West Second Street, Grand Island, Nebraska
- Coordinates: 40°55′18″N 98°20′52″W
- Area: less than one acre
- Built: 1905
- Built by: Henry H. Falldorf
- Architectural style: Classical Revival
- NRHP reference No.: 86000390
- Added to NRHP: March 13, 1986

The Hamilton-Donald House is a historic house in Grand Island, Nebraska. It was built in 1905 for Ellsworth D. Hamilton by Henry Falldorf. In 1908, it was acquired by John Donald, a co-founder of the Donald Company, a dry goods and grocer's store. (Donald later purchased the Glade-Donald House, another historic house.) The house was designed in the Classical Revival architectural style. It has been listed on the National Register of Historic Places since March 13, 1986.
