= Hall County Courthouse =

Hall County Courthouse may refer to:

- Old Hall County Courthouse (Georgia), Gainesville, Georgia
- Hall County Courthouse (Nebraska), Grand Island, Nebraska
- Hall County Courthouse (Texas), Memphis, Texas
