= Doniphan High School =

Doniphan High School can refer to:

- Doniphan High School (Nebraska) in Doniphan, Nebraska
- Doniphan High School (Missouri) in Doniphan, Missouri
