= Oscar Roeser House =

- U.S. National Register of Historic Places
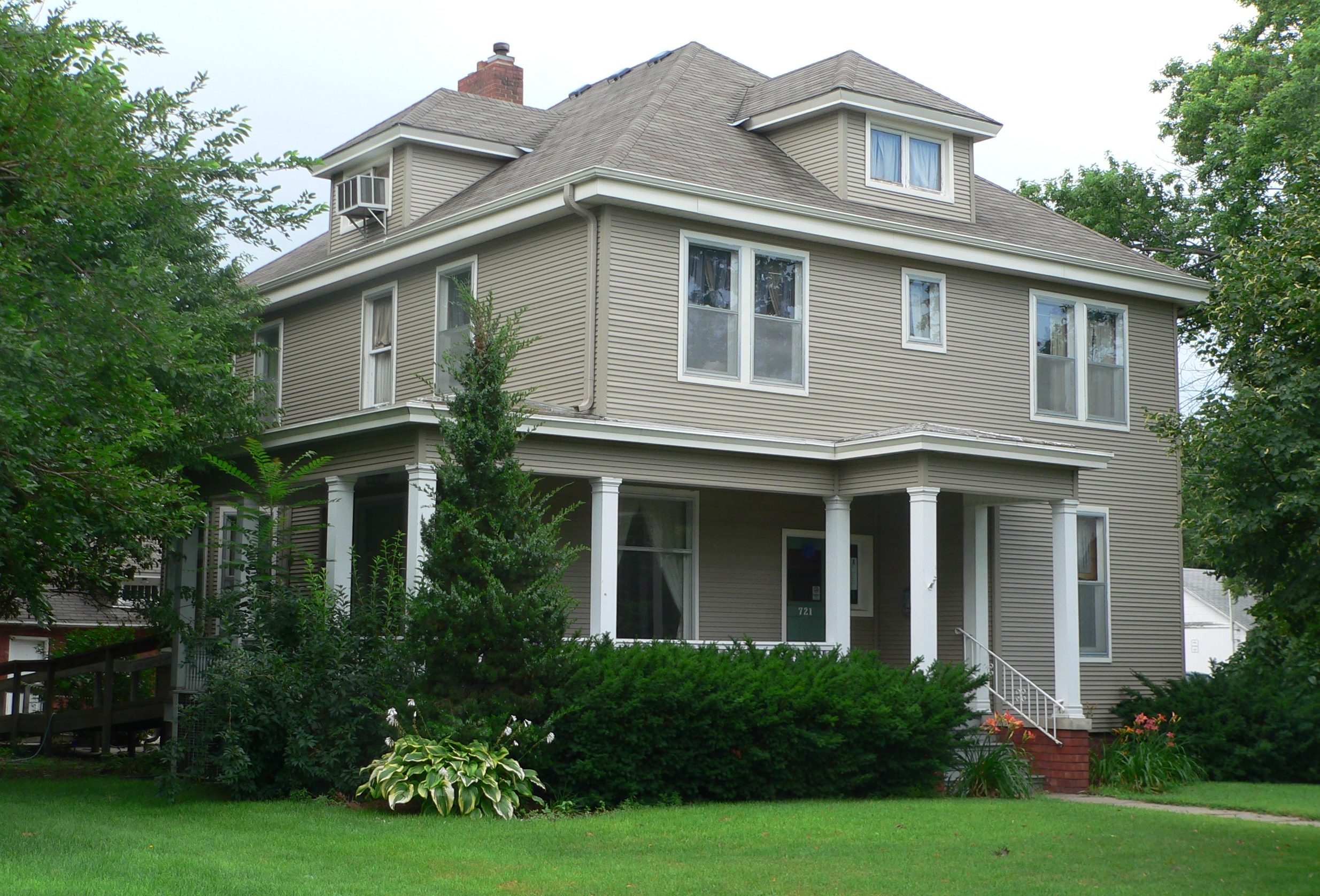
- The house in 2011

- Location within Nebraska Location within the United States
- Location: 721 West Koenig Street, Grand Island, Nebraska
- Coordinates: 40°55′09″N 98°20′40″W
- Area: less than one acre
- Built: 1908
- Built by: Henry Falldorf
- Architect: Thomas Rogers Kimball
- Architectural style: Classical Revival
- NRHP reference No.: 82003190
- Added to NRHP: June 25, 1982

The Oscar Roeser House is a historic house in Grand Island, Nebraska. It was built by Henry Falldorf in 1908 for Oscar Roeser, a businessman from Michigan who lived here with his wife, née Minnie Stolley, and their son, Oscar. Roeser was of German descent, and he joined the Liederkranz in Grand Island. His house was designed in the Classical Revival style by Thomas Rogers Kimball. It has been listed on the National Register of Historic Places since June 25, 1982.
