= 1952 Nebraska gubernatorial election =

- November 4, 1952
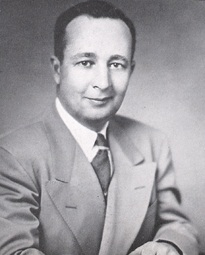

Nominee	Robert B. Crosby	Walter R. Raecke
Party	Republican	Democratic
Popular vote	366,009	229,700
Percentage	61.44%	38.56%
- County results Crosby: 50–60% 60–70% 70–80% 80–90% Raecke: 50–60% 60–70%
Governor before election
Val Peterson
Republican
Elected Governor
Robert B. Crosby
Republican

The 1952 Nebraska gubernatorial election was held on November 4, 1952, and featured former Lieutenant Governor Robert B. Crosby, a Republican, defeating Democratic nominee, former state Senator Walter R. Raecke.

== Democratic primary ==
=== Candidates ===
- Nina B. Dillingham
- Don Maloney
- Walter R. Raecke, former Speaker of the Nebraska Legislature

=== Results ===
Democratic primary results
Party	Candidate	Votes	%
Democratic	Walter R. Raecke	82,141	77.95
Democratic	Don Maloney	17,884	16.97
Democratic	Nina B. Dillingham	5,011	4.76
Democratic	Write-in	345	0.33

== Republican primary ==
=== Candidates ===
- Victor Anderson, Mayor of Lincoln and former member of the Nebraska Legislature
- Robert B. Crosby, former Lieutenant Governor and Speaker of the Nebraska Legislature
- John G. Donner, Elgin auctioneer
- Andrew E. Swanson
- Arthur B. Walker, physician and perennial candidate in the Republican primaries (who ran for governor in 1950, 1948, 1946, and for lieutenant governor in 1938)

=== Results ===
Republican primary results
Party	Candidate	Votes	%
Republican	Robert B. Crosby	114,139	52.31
Republican	Victor Anderson	86,778	39.77
Republican	Andrew E. Swanson	8,112	3.72
Republican	John G. Donner	5,094	2.33
Republican	Arthur B. Walker	3,997	1.83
Republican	Write-in	64	0.03

== General election ==
=== Results ===
Nebraska gubernatorial election, 1952
Party	Candidate	Votes	%
Republican	Robert B. Crosby	366,009	61.44%
Democratic	Walter R. Raecke	229,700	38.56%
Write-in	Others	5	>0.01%
Total votes		595,714	100.0%
Republican hold			

==== By County ====
By county

County	Person Democratic		Person Republican		Various candidates Other parties		Margin		Total votes
County	#	%	#	%	#	%	#	%	Total votes
Adams County									
Antelope County									
Arthur County									
Banner County									
Blaine County									
Boone County									
Box Butte County									
Boyd County									
Brown County									
Buffalo County									
Burt County									
Butler County									
Cass County									
Cedar County									
Chase County									
Cherry County									
Cheyenne County									
Clay County									
Colfax County									
Cuming County									
Custer County									
Dakota County									
Dawes County									
Dawson County									
Deuel County									
Dixon County									
Dodge County									
Douglas County									
Dundy County									
Fillmore County									
Franklin County									
Frontier County									
Furnas County									
Gage County									
Garden County									
Garfield County									
Gosper County									
Grant County									
Greeley County									
Hall County									
Hamilton County									
Hayes County									
Hitchcock County									
Holt County									
Hooker County									
Howard County									
Jefferson County									
Johnson County									
Kearney County									
Keith County									
Keya Paha County									
Kimball County									
Knox County									
Lancaster County									
Lincoln County									
Logan County									
Loup County									
Madison County									
McPherson County									
Merrick County									
Morrill County									
Nance County									
Nance County									
Nemaha County									
Nuckolls County									
Otoe County									
Pawnee County									
Perkins County									
Phelps County									
Pierce County									
Platte County									
Polk County									
Red Willow County									
Richardson County									
Rock County									
Saline County									
Sarpy County									
Saunders County									
Scotts Bluff County									
Seward County									
Sheridan County									
Sioux County									
Stanton County									
Thayer County									
Stanton County									
Thurston County									
Valley County									
Washington County									
Wayne County									
Webster County									
Wheeler County									
York County									
Totals									

== See also ==
- 1952 Nebraska lieutenant gubernatorial election
