= Center Township, Hall County, Nebraska =

Center Township
- Township
- Location within Nebraska
- Coordinates: 40°55′01″N 98°26′08″W
- Country: United States
- State: Nebraska
- County: Hall

Area
  - Total: 27.1 sq mi (70.2 km^{2})
  - Land: 27.1 sq mi (70.2 km^{2})
  - Water: 0 sq mi (0.00 km^{2})
- Elevation: 1,893 ft (577 m)

Population (2020)
  - Total: 872
  - Density: 32.2/sq mi (12.4/km^{2})
- Time zone: UTC-6 (Central (CST))
  - Summer (DST): UTC-5 (CDT)
- Area code: 308
- FIPS code: 31-08325
- GNIS feature ID: 837908

Center Township is a township in Hall County, Nebraska, United States. The population was 872 at the 2020 census. It is directly west of the city of Grand Isle.

A northern portion of the village of Alda is located in Center Township.
