= Alva Johnston =

Alva Johnston may refer to:

- Alva Johnston (journalist) (1888–1950), American journalist
- Alva Johnston (politician) (1872–1953), American politician from Nebraska
