= Knickrehm =

Knickrehm is a surname. Notable people with the surname include:

- Janice Knickrehm (1925–2013), American actress
- John Knickrehm (1890–1955), American politician from Nebraska
