= Grand Island Public Library =

Public library in Grand Island, Nebraska, U.S.

- 40.920686509784254°N 98.35126918447018°W
- Location: 1124 W 2nd St., Grand Island, Nebraska, U.S.
- Type: Public library
- Established: 1884; 142 years ago

Collection
- Size: 115,906

Access and use
- Circulation: 322,121
- Population served: 36,970

Other information
- Website: www.gilibrary.org

- Grand Island Carnegie Library
- U.S. National Register of Historic Places
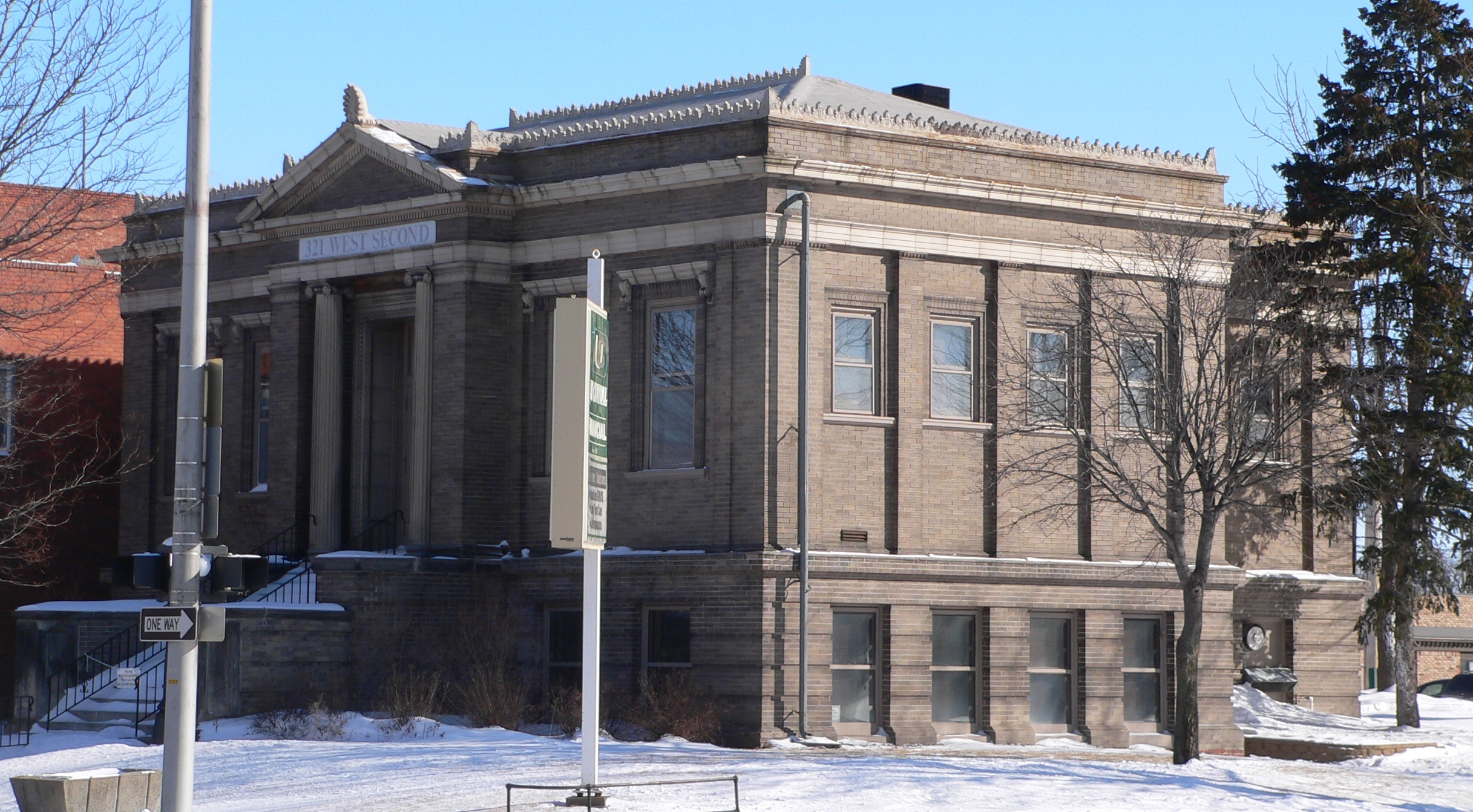
- The library in 2010
- Location: 321 West 2nd Street, Grand Island, Nebraska, U.S.
- Coordinates: 40°55′25″N 98°20′30″W
- Area: less than one acre
- Built: 1903
- Architectural style: Classical Revival
- NRHP reference No.: 75001094
- Added to NRHP: May 2, 1975

Grand Island Public Library, also known as the Edith Abbott Memorial Library, is a public library in Grand Island, Nebraska, United States. The library was established in 1884. The library moved to the Carnegie library in 1906 and moved to its current location in 1974.

== History ==
The Grand Island Public Library was established in 1884 following a year of development. The library was established by the Grand Island City Council and was located in the second floor of the First National Bank building. The library did not have a permanent home until a $20,000 donation by Andrew Carnegie was announced in 1902 to build one. Ground was broken for the library in 1903 and the library was completed in 1906. The library was added to the National Register of Historic Places on May 2, 1975.

In 1970, due to the previous library's small size and condition, a new library was announced for the city. While attempts to build a new library had been ongoing since 1927, the bond issues required to fund construction all failed. Funding began in 1968 and construction began in 1972. The library, branded as the Edith Abbott Memorial Library was officially dedicated in April 1974. The library underwent a 25,000 square feet (2,300 m^{2}) addition and renovation of its building, and re-opened in 2007.

== Architecture ==
The Carnegie library was designed in the Classical Revival architectural style and had around 11,616 square feet (1,079.2 m^{2}) of space.
