= Ed Hoyt =

American politician (1900–1972)

8th Speaker of the Nebraska Legislature
- In office January 2, 1951 – June 1, 1952
- Preceded by: Earl J. Lee
- Succeeded by: Otto Prohs

Member of the Nebraska Legislature from the 33rd district
- In office January 2, 1945 – June 1, 1952
- Preceded by: Earl Neubauer
- Succeeded by: George Frazier

Personal details
- Born: June 3, 1900 McCook, Nebraska
- Died: November 22, 1972 (aged 72) McCook, Nebraska
- Party: Republican
- Spouse: Helen Edgecombe (m. 1924)
- Children: 2
- Education: University of Nebraska (B.Sc.)
- Occupation: Teacher, coach, farmer

C. Edward Hoyt (June 3, 1900 – November 22, 1972) was a Republican politician from Nebraska who served as a member of the Nebraska Legislature from the 33rd district from 1945 to 1952, including as Speaker of the Nebraska Legislature from 1951 to 1952.

== Early life ==
Hoyt was born in McCook, Nebraska, in 1900, and graduated from McCook High School. He later graduated from the University of Nebraska, receiving his bachelor's degree in business administration. Hoyt was a farmer and later taught and coached sports at McCook High School. He owned a hardware business and served on the McCook School Board.

== Nebraska Legislature ==
In 1944, Hoyt ran for the Nebraska Legislature, challenging incumbent State Senator Earl Neubauer in the 33rd district. Hoyt placed first in the primary, winning 44 percent of the vote to Neubauer's 36 percent, and they advanced to the general election. Neubauer narrowly lost to Hoyt, receiving 48 percent of the vote to Hoyt's 52 percent.

Hoyt ran for re-election in 1946, and was challenged by Holly Hodge. He received 73 percent of the vote in the primary, and they advanced to the general election. Hoyt defeated Hodge in the general election, winning 80 percent of the vote to Hodge's 20 percent. Hodge challenged Hoyt again in 1948. Hoyt won the primary election, 71–29 percent, and defeated Hodge in the general election with 73 percent of the vote. In 1950, Hoyt defeated Hodge in the general election with 70 percent to her 30 percent.

At the start of the 1951 legislative session, Hoyt ran for Speaker. He was elected on the first ballot, receiving 25 votes to Arthur Carmody's 15, while Karl Vogel, Earl J. Lee, and Charles Tvrdik received one vote each. After the first ballot, Hoyt was elected by acclamation.

== 1952 lieutenant-gubernatorial campaign ==
On July 30, 1951, Hoyt announced that he would run for Lieutenant Governor in 1952, challenging incumbent Charles J. Warner in the Republican primary. Hoyt launched a statewide campaign, but lost to Warner in a landslide, receiving 29 percent of the vote to Warner's 71 percent.

== Post-legislative career ==
After Hoyt lost the primary, Governor Val Peterson announced that he would appoint him to serve as assistant director of the Nebraska Department of Agriculture. Hoyt resigned from the legislature on June 1, 1952. After Robert B. Crosby was elected governor that year, he announced that he would appoint Hoyt as the director of the department. Hoyt served until the election of Democrat Ralph G. Brooks in 1958.

In 1959, after leaving office, Hoyt was appointed assistant to the director of the Bureau of Land Management. He later moved to Denver to serve as a property management specialist in the Bureau's office, and retired to McCook.

== Death ==
Hoyt died on November 22, 1972.
