= 1952 Nebraska lieutenant gubernatorial election =

- November 4, 1952
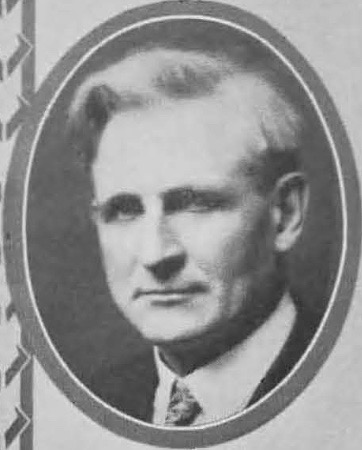

Nominee	Charles J. Warner	A. Clifford Anderson
Party	Republican	Democratic
Popular vote	359,206	201,400
Percentage	64.1%	35.9%
Lieutenant Governor before election
Charles J. Warner
Republican
Elected Lieutenant Governor
Charles J. Warner
Republican

The 1952 Nebraska lieutenant gubernatorial election was held on November 4, 1952, and featured incumbent Nebraska Lieutenant Governor Charles J. Warner, a Republican, defeating Democratic nominee A. Clifford Anderson, a political newcomer, to win his third term as lieutenant governor.

== Democratic primary ==
=== Candidates ===
A. Clifford Anderson ran unopposed in the Democratic primary. He was a realtor from Lincoln, Nebraska, who had not sought political office before.

=== Results ===
Democratic primary results
Party	Candidate	Votes	%
Democratic	A. Clifford Anderson	90,462	99.91
Scattering		78	

== Republican primary ==
=== Candidates ===
- Ed Hoyt, Speaker of the Nebraska Legislature and member of the Nebraska Legislature from what was then District 33
- Charles J. Warner, incumbent Nebraska Lieutenant Governor

=== Results ===
Republican primary results
Party	Candidate	Votes	%
Republican	Charles J. Warner (incumbent)	135,881	71.05
Republican	Ed Hoyt	55,339	28.93
Scattering		33	

== General election ==
=== Results ===
Nebraska lieutenant gubernatorial election, 1952
Party	Candidate	Votes	%
Republican	Charles J. Warner (incumbent)	359,206	64.07
Democratic	A. Clifford Anderson	201,400	35.93
Total votes		560,606	100.00
Republican hold			

== See also ==
- 1952 Nebraska gubernatorial election
