= Merrick Machine Company =

U.S. manufacturer

Merrick Machine Co, Triad Companies
- Type: Private
- Industry: Manufacturing; Housing; Auto
- Founded: Grand Island, Nebraska (1960)
- Founder: Jim Merrick
- Headquarters: Alda, Nebraska; 140 Apollo Ave.
- Area served: Worldwide
- Key people: Richard Merrick, President Triad Companies; Russell Merrick, President Merrick Machine Co, CEO Triad Group of Companies; Troy Carswell, COO Triad Group of Companies
- Products: Automated Housing Machinery; Auto Dolly products
- Website: www.merrickmachine.com www.theautodolly.com www.triadmachines.com

Merrick Machine Company is a U.S. manufacturer based out of Alda Nebraska that produces custom automated housing machinery, The Auto Dolly, and The Auto Dolly accessory products, Merrick Originals. Merrick Machine Co was the founding business under the parent name of Triad, which now includes five other companies, all owned by the Merrick family. These companies are structured as limited partnerships and include Triad Fastener, Denver Plastics Nebraska, Merrick Machine Company, Fu-Tek Tool, and Triad Products. Each business is a stand-alone company doing business in separate facilities with independent offices, manufacturing, and warehousing.

Jim Merrick (1919-2000) founded the Merrick Machine Company with his invention of the Window Frame Machine in 1960, under the brand name of Triad. Jim Merrick's son Richard Merrick is the head of Triad Companies, and his grandson Russell Merrick is the President of Merrick Machine Company. In 2011, Richard Merrick started the transition to retirement, and Russell Merrick was named CEO of the Triad Group.

== History ==
Merrick Machine Company was founded by Jim Merrick in 1960 out of his garage in Grand Island Nebraska. The Window Frame Machine was his first invention, designed to simplify the building and production of window frames. With this invention, Merrick Machine was created. Because of demand, Jim was eventually forced to move his company out of his garage and into a larger facility in the neighboring town of Alda which is the current company location. Jim went on to develop other automated housing equipment including Wall Panel Fabrication Machines, Fastening Equipment and Sub-Component Machines, all under the brand name of Triad.

In the early 1970s, Jim Merrick conceived the “diversified manufacturing business model” which attempts to conglomerate several types of manufacturing companies in order to diversify the industries served. This was done because each of those industries do better or worse at different times of the business cycle, creating in theory less earnings volatility, allowing greater chance for growth of the total business. Because Merrick Machine Company was so sensitive to fluctuations in the housing industry, Jim sought to expand into other businesses including automated machinery, automotive, plastics injection molding, tooling fabrication, signage and others.

In 1972, Merrick Machine began the diversification process into the plastic's business, creating several other operational business.

1. Triad Fastener LP (Injection molding company)
2. Fu-Tek Machine and Tooling (Custom molds/dies)
3. Denver Plastics NE (Injection molding company)
4. Triad Products Company (Agricultural base)

Jim's son Richard Merrick took over operations of Merrick Machine in 1977, and his grandson Russell Merrick took over Merrick Machine Company in 1988.

== Awards ==
Jim Merrick was awarded the 1986 James R. Price/Automation in Housing & Manufactured Home Dealer Achievement in Housing Award. This award was in recognition of his inventions and contributions to the housing industry.

== Products ==
- Merrick Machine Company specializes in custom automated housing machinery, including Panel Fabrication Machines, Fastening Equipment, Sub-Component Machines and custom build equipment.
- In 1990 Merrick Machine purchased Ruvo Automation Corp which manufactured machinery for the production of pre-hung doors. The Ruvo Production line has since been included to the products of Merrick Machine Company.
- In 2002 Merrick Machine began production of The Auto Dolly, marketed as a high quality dolly used for easily moving cars and other vehicles. Merrick Originals was developed as the line of accessory products to the Auto Dolly, and later included separate automotive restoration products.
- In 2008 Merrick Machine began production of the Triad WindGen line, a traditional looking wind turbine. Production ended in 2012 and was discontinued for this product line.

== Other Triad companies ==
=== Triad Fastener LP ===
Triad Fastener was the first of the molding companies, founded in 1972. This plant is the home of five Cinpress Nytrogen gas units to produce gas-assisted molding for various customers. Molding machines at this plant produce product from machines ranging in size from 120T to 500T, including two-shot machines for over-molding, vertical insert molding, robotic assembly operations and decorative process systems.
Custom plastic products include irrigation gates, bobbins, boxes, skillets, tree protectors, tubes, door straps, keg caps and other varied plastic products.

=== Fu-Tek Machine and Tooling ===
Fu-Tek, also located in Alda NE, is a captive tool and die company that produces many of the tools required for production in the various plants. Fu-Tek specializes in working with customers to create custom molds/dies for injection molding plastic products, as well as machining and offering Rapid Prototyping. This company provides part design, proto-type modeling, mold-flow analysis, material recommendations, and mold warranties for the full life of the project.

=== Denver Plastics NE ===
Denver Plastics Nebraska was built in 1984 in Wahoo NE. This plant has the largest molding machines of the other Triad Companies including a 1000T, 1450T, 1500T, and 2200T. Conventional smaller machines, electric, vertical insert molders, and two-shot machines for over-molding, and special custom assembly systems complete the line.
Products regularly manufactured include flooring items, sign boards, ATV components, automotive items, construction items and other custom plastic products.

=== Triad Products Company ===
Triad Products is an injection molding plastics manufacturer, but has historically been a business-to-business phone sales company with a varied product list. Many of the products sold are manufactured by one of the sister companies. Triad Products sells a varied assortment of products geared towards agriculture, signage, brewery items, packaging, as well as tree protectors, grommets and fence caps.
