= Andrew M. Hargis House =

- U.S. National Register of Historic Places
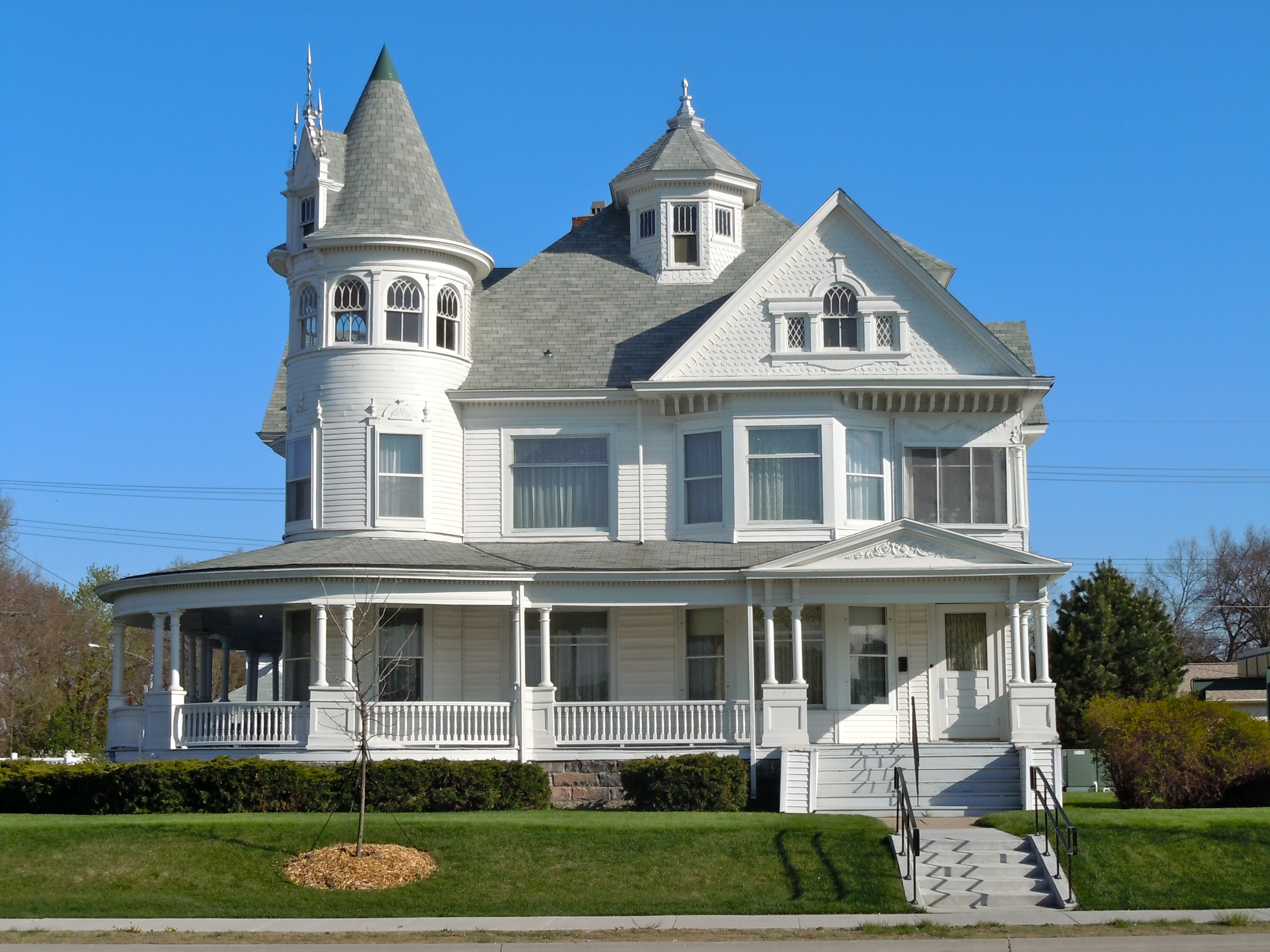
- The house in 2011

- Location within Nebraska Location within the United States
- Location: 1109 West 2nd Street, Grand Island, Nebraska
- Coordinates: 40°55′13″N 98°21′00″W
- Area: less than one acre
- Built: 1898
- Architectural style: Queen Anne
- NRHP reference No.: 78001700
- Added to NRHP: June 9, 1978

The Andrew M. Hargis House is a historic house in Grand Island, Nebraska. It was built in 1898 for Andrew M. Hargis, a co-founder of the Grand Island Business and Normal College, and designed in the Queen Anne architectural style. It was purchased by banker F. J. Coates in 1913, and it became the Grand Island Women's Club in 1953. It has been listed on the National Register of Historic Places since June 9, 1978.
