= Heinrich Giese House =

- U.S. National Register of Historic Places
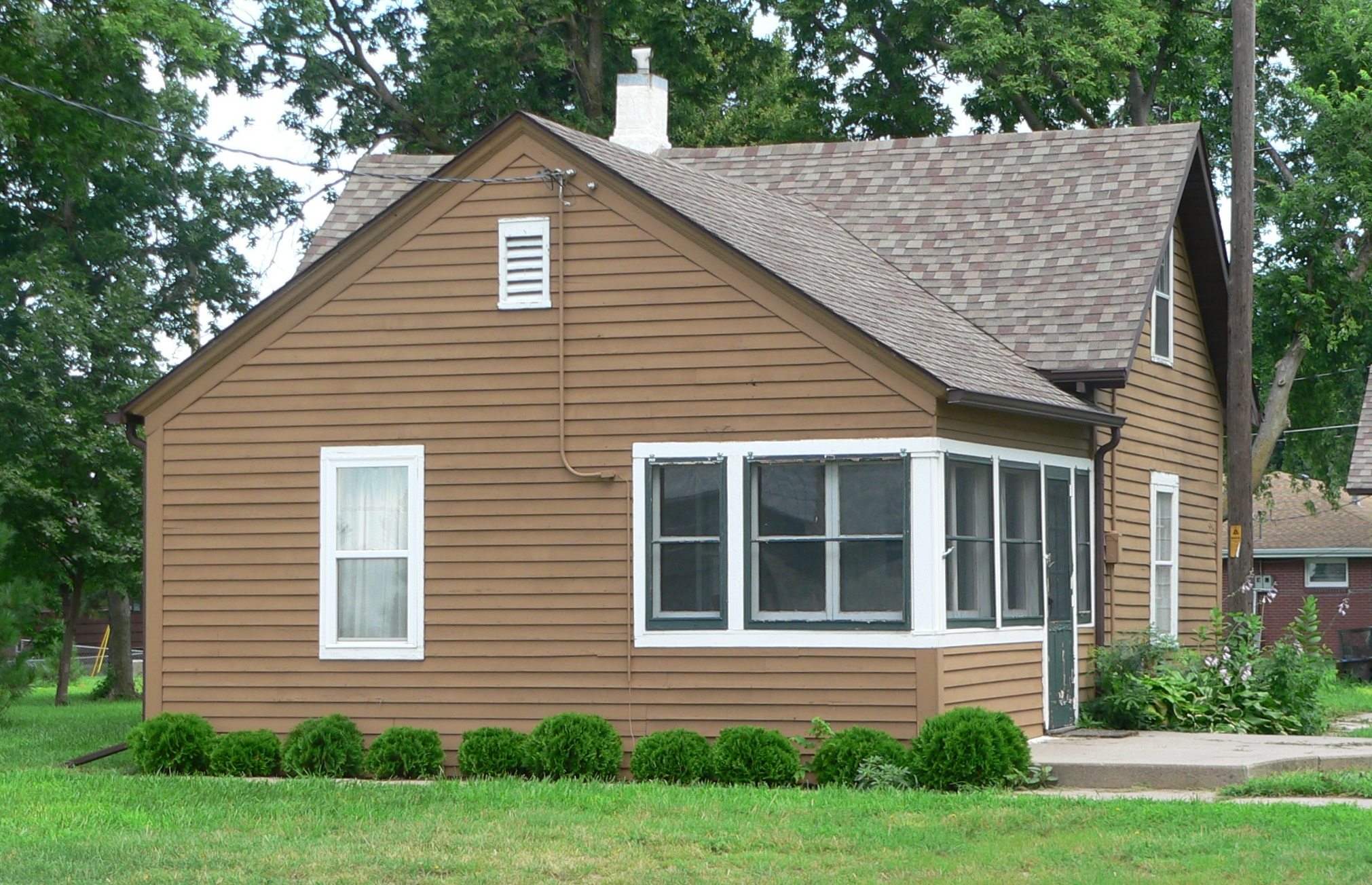
- The house in 2011

- Location within Nebraska Location within the United States
- Location: 2226 South Blaine, Grand Island, Nebraska
- Coordinates: 40°53′59″N 98°21′55″W
- Area: less than one acre
- Built: 1863
- Built by: Heinrich Giese
- Architectural style: Log Cabin
- NRHP reference No.: 06000641
- Added to NRHP: July 26, 2006

The Heinrich Giese House is a historic house in Grand Island, Nebraska. It was built in 1863 as a log cabin by Heinrich Giese, an immigrant from Holstein, Germany. Giese lived here with his wife, née Mary Obermiller, and their seven children. The house has been listed on the National Register of Historic Places since July 26, 2006.
