= Doniphan Township, Hall County, Nebraska =

Township in Nebraska, USA

Coordinates: 40.776°N 98.328°W

Doniphan Township is a township in Hall County, Nebraska, in the United States.

== History ==
It was organized in 1881.
