= Earl Neubauer =

American politician (1885–1975)

Member of the Nebraska Legislature from the 33rd district
- In office January 5, 1937 – January 2, 1945
- Preceded by: Position created
- Succeeded by: Ed Hoyt

Member of the Nebraska State Senate from the 28th district
- In office January 6, 1931 – January 1, 1935
- Preceded by: George C. Junkin
- Succeeded by: Edward Gillette

Member of the Nebraska House of Representatives from the 83rd district
- In office January 6, 1925 – January 6, 1931
- Preceded by: D. S. Hardin
- Succeeded by: Simeon Woodruff

Personal details
- Born: 1885 Oxford, Nebraska
- Died: May 7, 1975 (aged 89) Alma, Nebraska
- Party: Democratic
- Spouse: Annetta Davis (m. 1906; died 1958)
- Children: 2
- Education: Hastings College
- Occupation: Businessman, farmer

Earl M. Neubauer (1885 – May 7, 1975) was a Democratic politician from Nebraska who served as a member of the state legislature from 1925 to 1935 and 1937 to 1945. He served in the Nebraska House of Representatives from the 83rd district from 1925 to 1931, the Nebraska State Senate from 1931 to 1935, and the unicameral Nebraska Legislature from the 33rd district from 1937 to 1945.

== Early life ==
Neubauer was born in Oxford, Nebraska, in 1885. He graduated from Hastings College in 1905, and settled in Orleans, where he was a farmer and president of the Farmers' Equity elevator.

== Nebraska House of Representatives ==
In 1924, Neubauer ran for the Nebraska House of Representatives from the 83rd district, challenging incumbent State Representative D. S. Hardin for re-election. Neubauer won the Democratic primary and faced Hardin in the general election, and won the general election with 56 percent of the vote. Neubauer was re-elected in 1926 and 1928.

== Nebraska State Senate ==
Neubauer ran for the 28th district, challenging State Senator George Junkin for re-election. Junkin had been appointed earlier in the year to succeed Harry Johnson, who died in 1929. Neubauer won the Democratic primary over W. H. Hodge by 9 votes, and faced Republican nominee Ralph Kiplinger, a businessman and member of the Holdrege Board of Education. In the general election, Neubauer defeated Kiplinger by 7 votes.

He ran for re-election in 1932, and was challenged by Madison County Attorney Carl Peterson in the Democratic primary. He narrowly won renomination, receiving 35 percent of the vote, and faced Republican C. Earl Freas in the general election. Neubauer defeated Freas with 58 percent of the vote.

== 1934 congressional campaign ==
In 1934, Neubauer announced that he would challenge Democratic Congressman Ashton C. Shallenberger for renomination in the 4th congressional district. Neubauer won 10 percent of the vote in the primary, losing to businessman Charles Bindup, who won 41 percent of the vote to Shallenberger's 32 percent.

== Nebraska Legislature ==
Following the consolidation of the State Senate and House into the unicameral legislature, Neubauer ran from the newly created 33rd district. In the nonpartisan primary, he faced State Representatives Owen Hopkins, Don Thompson, and J. E. W. Richards, former State Representative Simeon Woodruff, C. Earl Freas, and O. E. Shelburn. Neubauer and Freas advanced to the general election, which Neubauer won with 54 percent of the vote.

Neubauer ran for re-election in 1938, and was challenged by attorney Ernest Spencer, former State Representative J. E. W. Richards, and farmer Joseph Boehler. He placed first in the primary, receiving 41 percent of the vote to Spencer's 21 percent of the vote, and they proceeded to the general election. Neubauer narrowly defeated Spencer, winning 52 percent of the vote.

In 1940, Neubauer ran for a third term. He was opposed by Spencer, Donald L. Thompson, and C. C. Lull. Neubauer won 39 percent of the vote in the primary, and advanced to the general election with Spencer, who placed second with 25 percent. He defeated Spencer in the general election, winning 53–47 percent.

Neubauer ran for re-election to a fourth term in 1942, and was challenged by George King and Edward Sughroue. He received 56 percent of the vote in the primary, and faced King, who placed second with 24 percent of the vote, in the general election. Neubauer won the general election with 64 percent of the vote.

In 1944, Neubauer sought a fifth term. Hardware dealer Ed Hoyt, King, and Ami Meyers challenged him for re-election. Neubauer placed second in the primary, winning 36 percent of the vote to Hoyt's 44 percent. In the general election, Hoyt defeated Neubauer with 52 percent of the vote.

== Death ==
Neubauer died on May 7, 1975.
