= 1950 Nebraska gubernatorial election =

- November 7, 1950
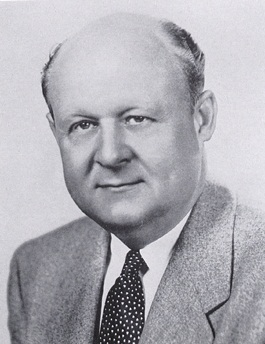

Nominee	Val Peterson	Walter R. Raecke
Party	Republican	Democratic
Popular vote	247,081	202,638
Percentage	54.94%	45.06%
- County results Peterson: 50–60% 60–70% 70–80% Raecke: 50–60% 60–70%
Governor before election
Val Peterson
Republican
Elected Governor
Val Peterson
Republican

The 1950 Nebraska gubernatorial election was held on November 7, 1950, and featured incumbent Governor Val Peterson, a Republican, defeating Democratic nominee, former state Senator Walter R. Raecke, to win a third and final two-year term in office.

== Democratic primary ==
=== Candidates ===
- Terry Carpenter, former U.S. Representative
- Henry L. Fillman, farmer and insurance businessman
- Frank B. Morrison, attorney and former school superintendent
- Walter R. Raecke, former Speaker of the Nebraska Legislature
- Harry R. Swanson, former Secretary of State

=== Results ===
Democratic primary results
Party	Candidate	Votes	%
Democratic	Walter R. Raecke	27,249	32.05
Democratic	Terry Carpenter	26,057	30.65
Democratic	Frank B. Morrison	20,242	23.81
Democratic	Harry R. Swanson	9,405	11.06
Democratic	Henry L. Fillman	2,048	2.41
Democratic	Write-in	17	0.02

== Republican primary ==
=== Candidates ===
- Ernest Adams, Douglas County Treasurer
- Val Peterson, incumbent Governor
- Arthur B. Walker, physician and candidate in the Republican primaries for governor in 1948, governor in 1946, and lieutenant governor in 1938

=== Results ===
Republican primary results
Party	Candidate	Votes	%
Republican	Val Peterson (incumbent)	93,689	69.63
Republican	Ernest A. Adams	29,571	21.98
Republican	Arthur B. Walker	11,274	8.38
Republican	Write-in	28	0.02

== General election ==
=== Results ===
Nebraska gubernatorial election, 1950
Party	Candidate	Votes	%
Republican	Val Peterson (incumbent)	247,081	54.94%
Democratic	Walter R. Raecke	202,638	45.06%
Write-in	Others	1	>0.01%
Total votes		449,720	100.0%
Republican hold			

==== By County ====
By county

County	Person Democratic		Person Republican		Various candidates Other parties		Margin		Total votes
County	#	%	#	%	#	%	#	%	Total votes
Adams County									
Antelope County									
Arthur County									
Banner County									
Blaine County									
Boone County									
Box Butte County									
Boyd County									
Brown County									
Buffalo County									
Burt County									
Butler County									
Cass County									
Cedar County									
Chase County									
Cherry County									
Cheyenne County									
Clay County									
Colfax County									
Cuming County									
Custer County									
Dakota County									
Dawes County									
Dawson County									
Deuel County									
Dixon County									
Dodge County									
Douglas County									
Dundy County									
Fillmore County									
Franklin County									
Frontier County									
Furnas County									
Gage County									
Garden County									
Garfield County									
Gosper County									
Grant County									
Greeley County									
Hall County									
Hamilton County									
Hayes County									
Hitchcock County									
Holt County									
Hooker County									
Howard County									
Jefferson County									
Johnson County									
Kearney County									
Keith County									
Keya Paha County									
Kimball County									
Knox County									
Lancaster County									
Lincoln County									
Logan County									
Loup County									
Madison County									
McPherson County									
Merrick County									
Morrill County									
Nance County									
Nance County									
Nemaha County									
Nuckolls County									
Otoe County									
Pawnee County									
Perkins County									
Phelps County									
Pierce County									
Platte County									
Polk County									
Red Willow County									
Richardson County									
Rock County									
Saline County									
Sarpy County									
Saunders County									
Scotts Bluff County									
Seward County									
Sheridan County									
Sioux County									
Stanton County									
Thayer County									
Stanton County									
Thurston County									
Valley County									
Washington County									
Wayne County									
Webster County									
Wheeler County									
York County									
Totals									

== See also ==
- 1950 Nebraska lieutenant gubernatorial election
