= H. J. Bartenbach House =

- U.S. National Register of Historic Places
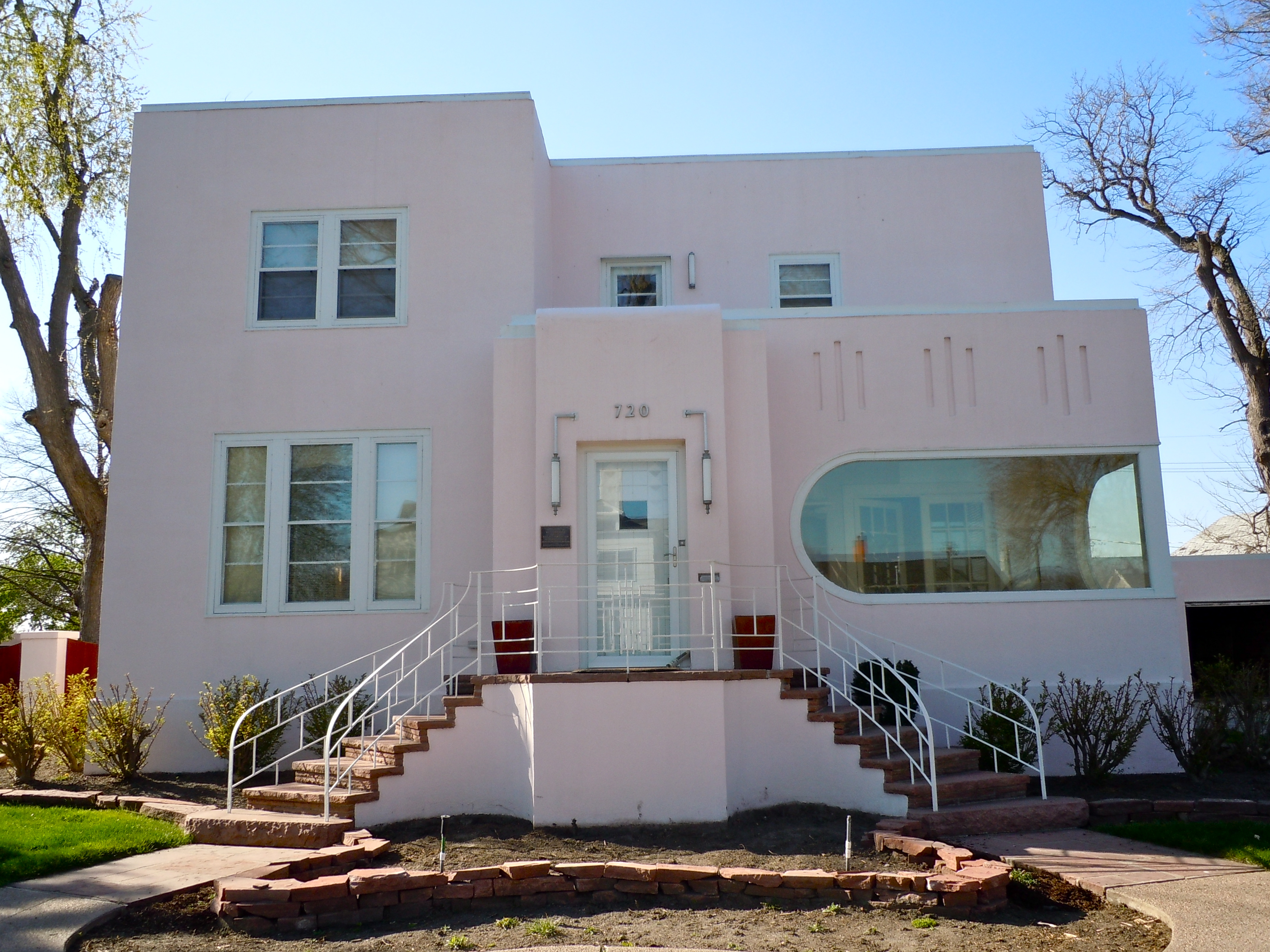
- The house in 2011

- Location within Nebraska Location within the United States
- Location: 720 West Division, Grand Island, Nebraska
- Coordinates: 40°55′13″N 98°20′43″W
- Area: less than one acre
- Built: 1937
- Architect: Gordon Shattuck
- Architectural style: Moderne, Streamline Moderne
- NRHP reference No.: 86003385
- Added to NRHP: December 8, 1986

The H. J. Bartenbach House is a historic house in Grand Island, Nebraska. It was built in 1937 for Henry J. Bartenbach. It was redesigned in the Streamline Moderne style by architect Gordon Shattuck in 1937–1938. For Joni Gilkerson of the Nebraska State Historical Society, "the house today stands as a notable product of the Moderne Style of architecture in Nebraska, gaining extraordinary significance as one of few recorded examples in the state and as the most important dwelling of the style in Grand Island, the home-town of architect Shattuck." It has been listed on the National Register of Historic Places since December 8, 1986.
