= Evangelische Lutherische Dreienigkeit Kirche =

- U.S. National Register of Historic Places
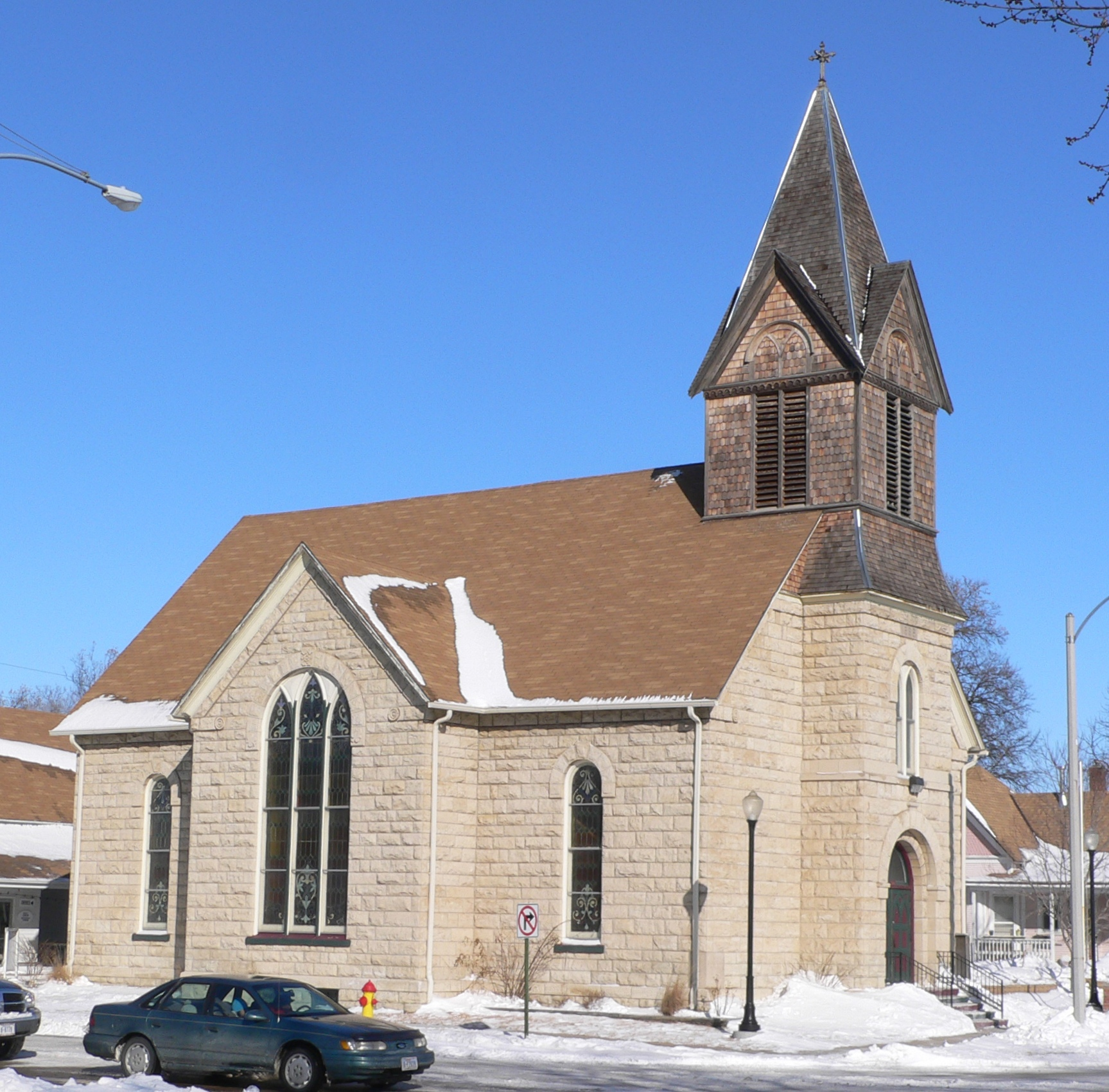
- A side view of the church in 2010

- Location within Nebraska Location within the United States
- Location: 512 East Second Street, Grand Island, Nebraska
- Coordinates: 40°55′38″N 98°20′04″W
- Area: less than one acre
- Built: 1894
- Built by: Jacob Scheffel; William Scheffel
- Architectural style: Romanesque, Vernacular Romanesque
- NRHP reference No.: 86003378
- Added to NRHP: December 1, 1986

Evangelische Lutherische Dreienigkeit Kirche, also known as the Trinity Evangelical Lutheran Church Complex, is a historic church building in Grand Island, Nebraska. It was built in 1894-1896 by two German immigrants, Jacob and William Scheffel. Others on the building committee were E. Wiederaenders, F. Pribnow, J. Ruff, J. Schinkel and F. Eggers. The congregation served pioneers from Germany. The building was designed in the Romanesque Revival architectural style. It has been listed on the National Register of Historic Places since December 1, 1986.
