= Lee Huff Apartment Complex =

- U.S. National Register of Historic Places
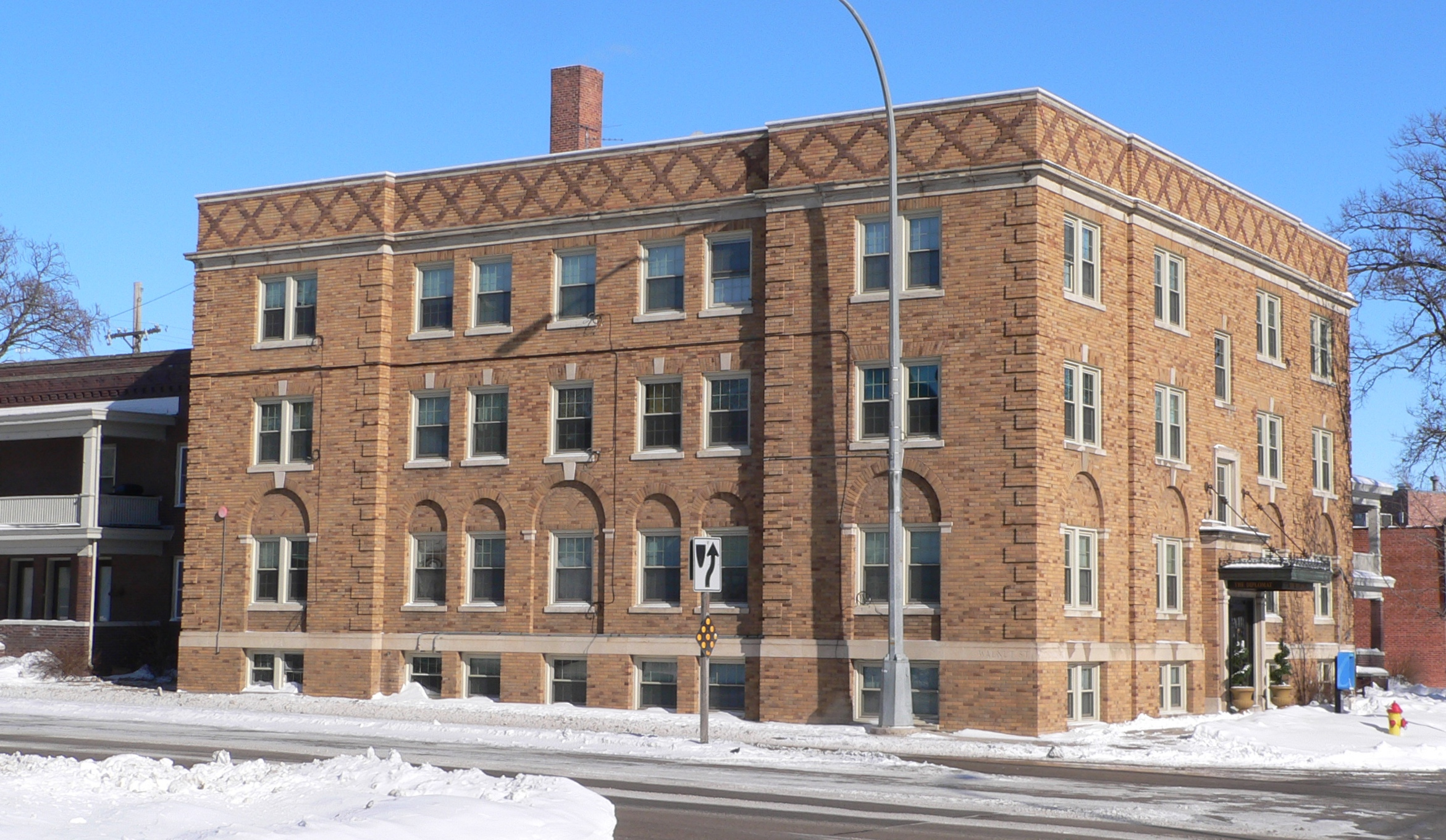
- The building in 2010

- Location within Nebraska Location within the United States
- Location: 213--215 1/2 S. Walnut St., 324 W. Koenig St., 316--318 1/2 W. Koenig St., Grand Island, Nebraska
- Coordinates: 40°55′16″N 98°20′25″W
- Area: less than one acre
- Built: 1920
- Built by: Paul Sothman
- Architect: James Allen
- Architectural style: Renaissance Revival
- NRHP reference No.: 94000652
- Added to NRHP: July 1, 1994

The Lee Huff Apartment Complex is a building in Grand Island, Nebraska. Two flats and the garage were built in 1920–1921, and the apartment complex was completed by Paul Sothman in 1928. It was designed in the Renaissance Revival style by architect James Allen. It has been listed on the National Register of Historic Places since July 1, 1994.
