= Walter Raecke =

American Democratic party politician

6th Speaker of the Nebraska Legislature
- In office January 7, 1947 – January 4, 1949
- Preceded by: C. Petrus Peterson
- Succeeded by: Earl J. Lee

Chair of the Executive Board of the Nebraska Legislature
- In office January 2, 1945 – January 7, 1947
- Preceded by: Stanley A. Matzke
- Succeeded by: Fred A. Seaton

Member of the Nebraska Legislature from the 30th district
- In office January 7, 1941 – January 4, 1949
- Preceded by: Alva Johnston
- Succeeded by: Louis A. Holmes

Personal details
- Born: October 17, 1895 Grand Island, Nebraska, U.S.
- Died: April 9, 1960 (aged 64) Grand Island, Nebraska, U.S.
- Party: Democratic

Walter R. Raecke (October 17, 1895 – April 9, 1960) was an American Democratic party politician, lawyer, and public servant. He served as Speaker of the unicameral Nebraska Legislature in 1947 and ran twice unsuccessfully for Governor of Nebraska in 1950 and 1952.

== Early life ==
Walter Raecke was born on October 17, 1895, in Grand Island, Nebraska, but moved with his parents to a Merrick County farm when he was just 18 months old. He attended Central City High School, graduating in 1913, and the University of Nebraska where he received a Bachelor of Laws degree in 1917. Raecke served in World War I as a second lieutenant.

== Career ==
Raecke began his political career at age 24 in 1919 by serving simultaneously as the city attorney for Central City, Nebraska, and the county attorney for Merrick County, Nebraska. He served as city attorney until 1932 and county attorney until 1935. In 1932, Raecke announced that he would run as a Democrat for Nebraska Attorney General, but his candidacy did not reach the general election that year. In 1937 and for a number of years thereafter, Raecke served on the Central City Board of Education.

In 1940, Raecke ran for a seat representing what was then District 30 in the Nebraska Legislature. He won the race and went on to serve in the legislature for eight years, spanning four regular and two special sessions. In 1945, Raecke was chosen by his colleagues in the legislature to be the chair of its executive board, which was then called the Legislative Council. In 1947, he was elected as the sixth speaker of the Nebraska Legislature. While the votes were being counted in his election as speaker, his chair on the legislature floor suddenly broke and he almost fell to the floor.

Raecke decided to pursue the governorship of Nebraska in 1950, entering a crowded Democratic primary field including former US Representative Terry Carpenter and future Nebraska Governor Frank B. Morrison. Raecke won the primary and went on to be the Democratic nominee for governor, but he lost the general election to incumbent governor Val Peterson in November. In 1952, Raecke initially did not want to run for governor and did not submit his name to the state Democratic convention for consideration. However, he received overwhelming support from the delegates and thus decided to run for governor again, winning the Democratic primary easily. He faced Republican Robert B. Crosby, who was also a former speaker of the Nebraska Legislature, in the general election but was once again defeated.

There was some speculation that Raecke may try to run for governor a third time in 1954, but he declined.

In his later years, Raecke served as the Nebraska representative on the board of directors of the Federal Home Loan Bank of Topeka, including as its chairman in 1958 and 1959.

== Personal life ==
Raecke married Orral J. Young on November 16, 1921, and they had three children. Raecke was a member of his local masonic lodge in Central City and also served as an elder and superintendent of Sunday school at First Presbyterian Church of Central City.

Raecke passed away on April 9, 1960, in Grand Island, Nebraska, of a heart attack.
