= Glade-Donald House =

- Glade--Donald House
- U.S. National Register of Historic Places
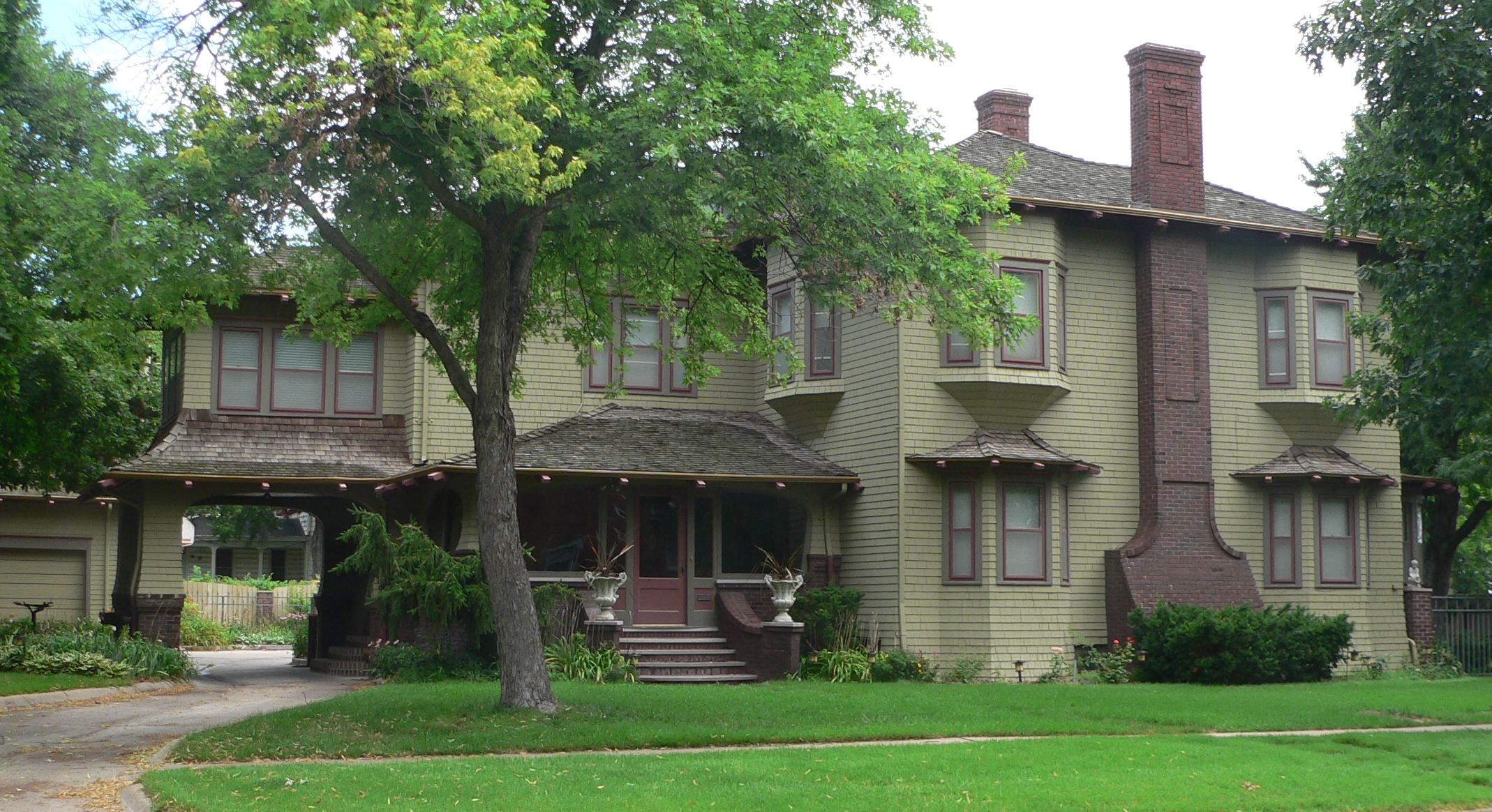
- The house in 2011

- Location within Nebraska Location within the United States
- Location: 1004 West Division, Grand Island, Nebraska
- Coordinates: 40°55′09″N 98°20′53″W
- Area: less than one acre
- Built: 1905
- Architectural style: Shingle Style
- NRHP reference No.: 85002140
- Added to NRHP: September 12, 1985

The Glade-Donald House is a historic house in Grand Island, Nebraska. It was built in 1905 for Henry Glade, a German immigrant, and designed in the Shingle style. It was acquired and remodelled by Lawrence Donald, a Scottish immigrant, in 1918, and purchased by his brother John Donald, also from Scotland, in 1934. The latter hired Russell Rohrer to redecorate its interior with new wallpapers and chandeliers. The house has been listed on the National Register of Historic Places since September 12, 1985.
