= Hall County Courthouse (Nebraska) =

- U.S. National Register of Historic Places
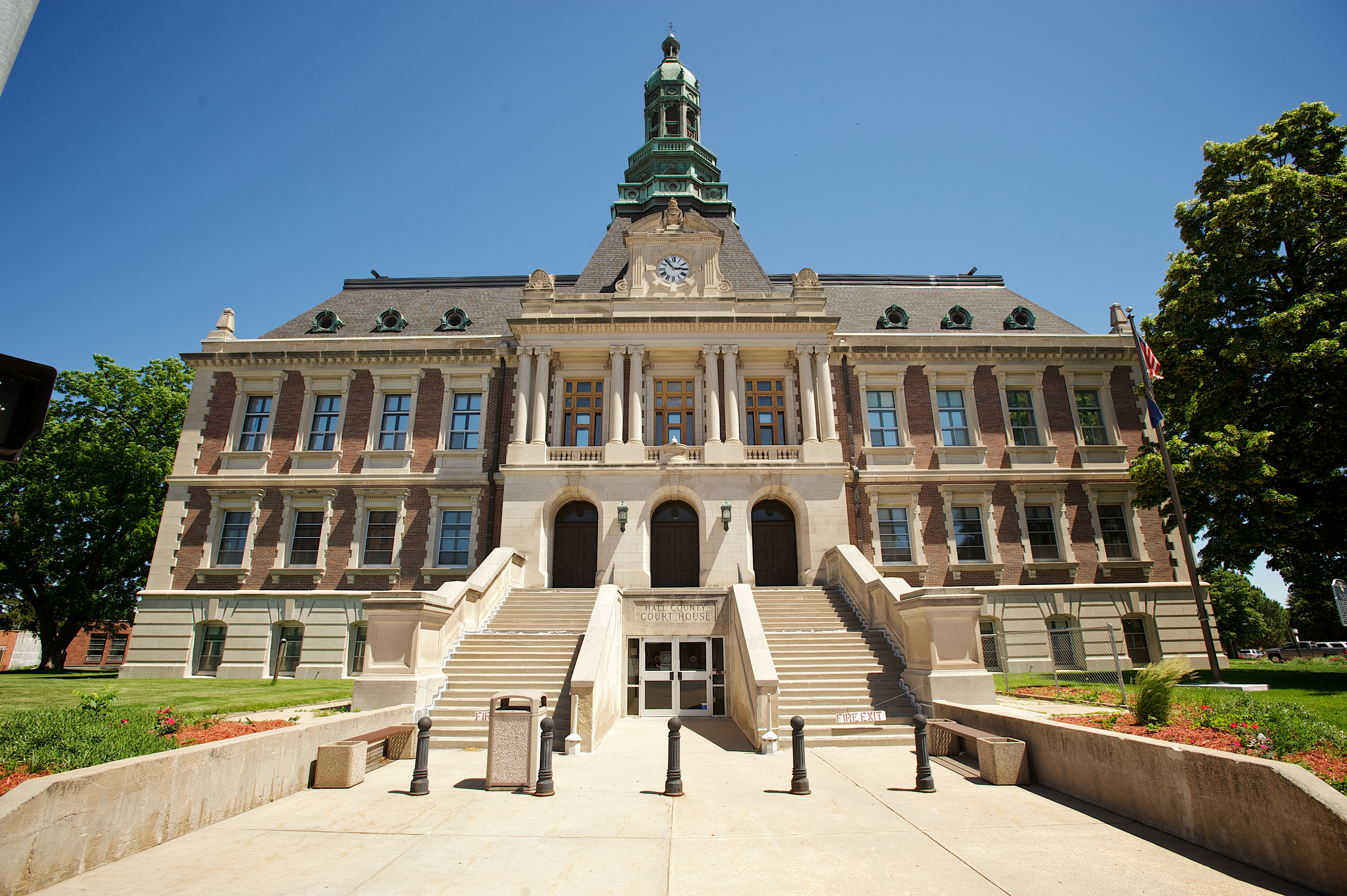
- The courthouse in 2014

- Location within Nebraska Location within the United States
- Location: 1st and Locust, Grand Island, Nebraska
- Coordinates: 40°55′25″N 98°20′20″W
- Area: less than one acre
- Built: 1901
- Architect: Thomas Rogers Kimball
- Architectural style: Beaux Arts
- NRHP reference No.: 77000831
- Added to NRHP: September 15, 1977

Hall County Courthouse is a historic building in Grand Island, Nebraska, and the courthouse for Hall County, Nebraska. When it was built in 1901–1904, it replaced a former courthouse at another location. It was designed in the Beaux Arts style by architect Thomas Rogers Kimball. It has been listed on the National Register of Historic Places since September 15, 1977.
