= Frost, Ohio =

Unincorporated community in Ohio, U.S.

Coordinates: 39°16′36″N 81°49′46″W

Frost is an unincorporated community in Athens County, in the U.S. state of Ohio.

== History ==
A post office called Frost was established in 1876, and remained in operation until 1976. The Frost family were among the earliest settlers in the area.
