= Grand Island station =

Rail depot

Grand Island
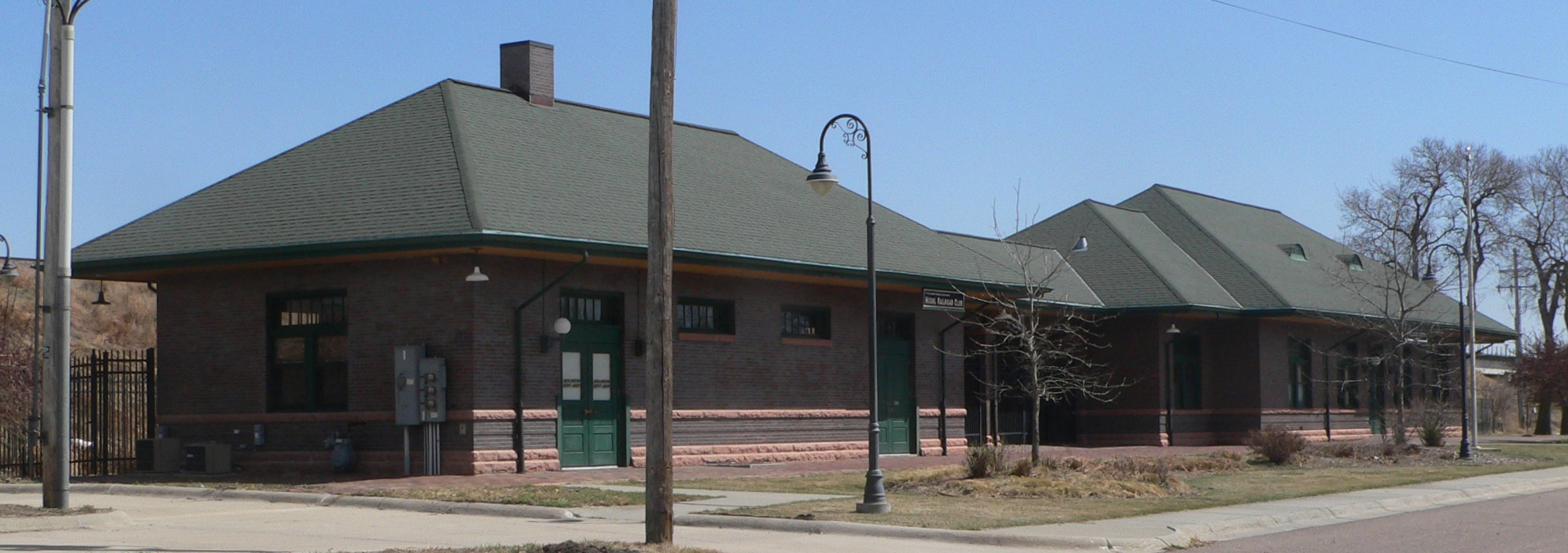
- Grand Island station (2015)

General information
- Location: 603 N. Plum Street, Grand Island, Nebraska 68801
- System: Former Burlington Route passenger rail station

History
- Opened: 1911
- Closed: 1969

Services
Preceding station	Burlington Route	Following station
Cairo toward Billings	Billings – Kansas City	Phillips toward Kansas City
- Burlington Railroad Depot
- U.S. National Register of Historic Places
- Location within Nebraska
- Location: 603 N. Plum Street, Grand Island, Nebraska
- Coordinates: 40°55′57″N 98°20′16″W
- Built: 1911
- Architectural style: Prairie style
- NRHP reference No.: 14001013
- Added to NRHP: December 2, 2014
Location

Grand Island station, otherwise known as the Burlington Railroad Depot in Grand Island, Nebraska is a historic railroad station which served trains of the Chicago, Burlington and Quincy Railroad (Burlington Route). The Prairie style station was constructed in 1911. It was likely designed by Walter T. Krausch, who designed many CB&Q depots, however the documentation of the depot was lost in a 1922 fire.

In 1940, the station had three daily trains per direction. Railcar service was provided daily as far as Lincoln and Ravenna while The Adventureland and The General Custer each ran daily service from Kansas City to Billings via Grand Island. By 1947, the railcar service had ended and by May 1965, only one Kansas City to Billings train remained. Passenger service ended completely in 1969.

The station was listed on the National Register of Historic Places on December 2, 2014.
