= John Knickrehm =

American politician (1890–1955)

Member of the Nebraska Railway Commission
- In office January 7, 1943 – January 6, 1949
- Preceded by: F. A. Good
- Succeeded by: Richard H. Larson

Member of the Nebraska Legislature from the 30th district
- In office January 5, 1937 – January 3, 1939
- Preceded by: Position created
- Succeeded by: Alva Johnston

Personal details
- Born: January 18, 1890 Grand Island, Nebraska
- Died: January 22, 1955 (aged 65) Lincoln, Nebraska
- Party: Republican
- Spouse(s): Emma Stoppkotte (m. 1913; died 1921) Raamah Schwartz (m. 1926)
- Children: 3
- Occupation: Grocer

John Knickrehm (January 18, 1890 – January 22, 1955) was a Republican politician from Nebraska who served as a member of the Nebraska Legislature from the 30th district from 1937 to 1939 and on the Nebraska Railway Commission from 1943 to 1949.

== Early life ==
Knickrehm was born in Grand Island, Nebraska, in 1890. He attended grade school in Grand Island, and owned a grocery store in the city. Knickrehm served on the Grand Island City Council and as president of the Nebraska Grocers' Association.

== Nebraska Legislature ==
In 1936, Knickrehm ran for the Nebraska Legislature from the 30th district, and faced seven opponents in the nonpartisan primary: George Baumann, former State Senators John Boelts and Thomas Bradstreet, M. A. Larson, George Mader, State Senator Archie O'Brien, and John Thomssen. Knickrehm placed first in the primary, and advanced to the general election with O'Brien. He ultimately defeated O'Brien, receiving 56 percent of the vote to O'Brien's 44 percent.

Knickrehm ran for re-election in 1938, and was challenged by former State Representative Alva Johnston, Merrick County Attorney Paul Morris, and Spanish–American War veteran Sam Elder. He narrowly placed second in the primary, winning 31 percent of the vote and receiving 33 fewer votes than Johnston. Johnston defeated Knickrehm by a landslide in the general election, receiving 66 percent of the vote to Knickrehm's 34 percent.

== Nebraska Railway Commission ==
In 1940, Knickrehm announced that he would run for the Railway Commission. Knickrehm, who weighed 335 pounds, said, "I'm the biggest Republican that's filed to date, and doubtless the biggest one that's ever filed." In the Republican primary, Knickrehm faced eighteen opponents, including former state bank examiner Richard Larson, State Senator Edwin Schultz, and former Public Lands Commissioner Leo Swanson. Knickrehm placed third in the primary, losing to Larson.

Knickrehm ran for the Railway Commission again in 1942, challenging incumbent Democrat F. A. Good for re-election. He won the Republican primary, which had fourteen candidates, with 12 percent of the vote. In the general election, he faced former Commissioner Will M. Maupin, who lost re-election in 1940 and defeated Good in the Democratic primary. He defeated Maupin with 60 percent of the vote.

In 1948, Knickrehm ran for re-election, and was challenged by former Commissioner Richard Larson, who had defeated Knickrehm in the 1940 primary and lost re-election in 1946, and mortician William C. Johnson. Knickrehm again lost to Larson, receiving 37 percent of the vote to Larson's 48 percent and Johnston's 15 percent.

Knickrehm announced that he would challenge incumbent Commissioner Harold A. Palmer, who had been elected to a two-year term in a 1948 special election, for re-election in the Republican primary in 1950. He lost to Palmer, receiving 31 percent of the vote to Palmer's 49 percent. When Walter Roberts resigned from the commission in 1952, Knickrehm sought an appointment from Governor Val Peterson, but Peterson announced that he would appoint the winner of the Republican primary to serve out the term, and Knickrehm did not run in the election.

== Death ==
Knickrehm died on January 22, 1955.
