= Alda, Nebraska =

Village in Hall County, Nebraska, United States

- Village
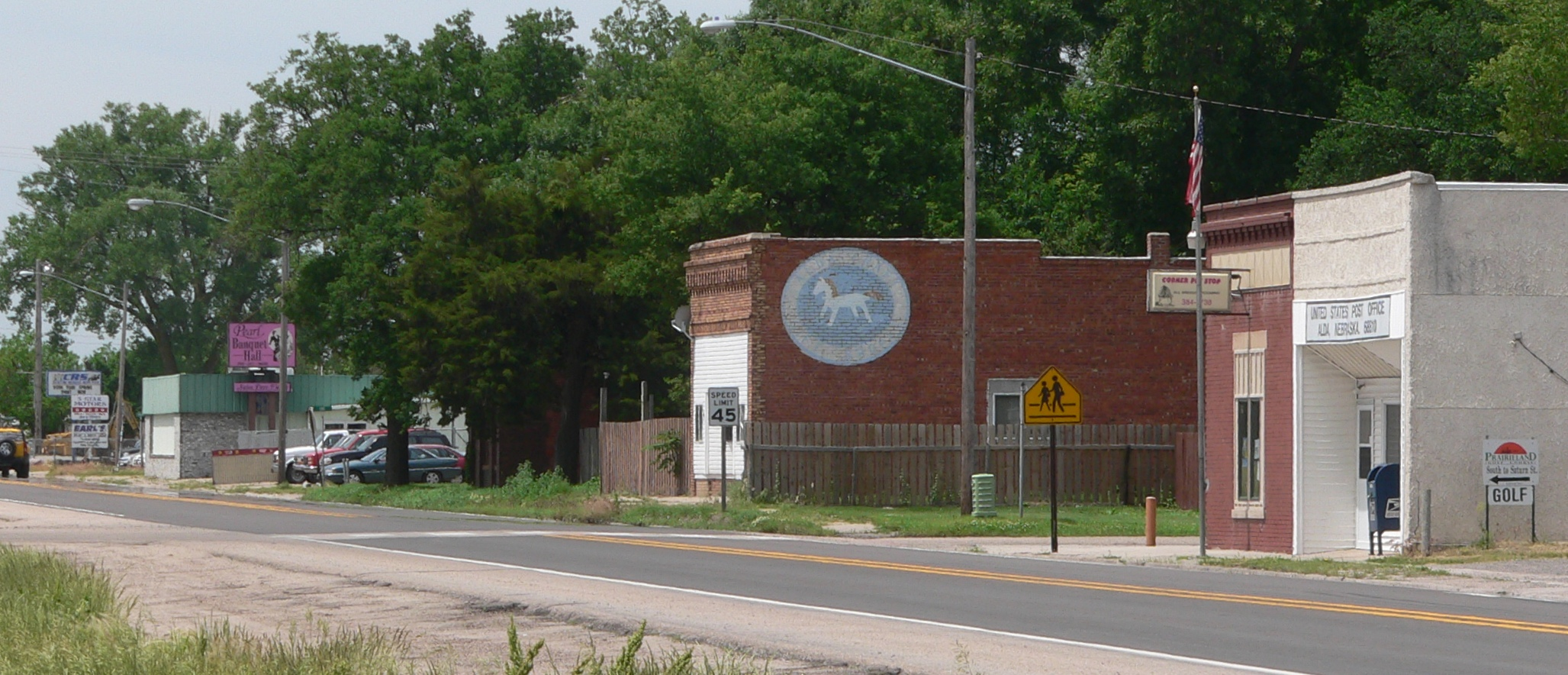
- Downtown Alda: north side of U.S. Route 30, looking northwest, June 2010
- Motto: "Working Together For A Brighter Future"
- Location of Alda, Nebraska
- Coordinates: 40°52′00″N 98°28′05″W
- Country: United States
- State: Nebraska
- County: Hall
- Townships: Alda, Center
- Settled: 1859

Area
  - Total: 0.57 sq mi (1.5 km^{2})
  - Land: 0.57 sq mi (1.5 km^{2})
  - Water: 0.00 sq mi (0 km^{2})
- Elevation: 1,916 ft (584 m)

Population (2020)
  - Total: 647
  - Density: 1,100/sq mi (440/km^{2})
- Time zone: UTC-6 (Central (CST))
  - Summer (DST): UTC-5 (CDT)
- ZIP code: 68810
- Area code: 308
- FIPS code: 31-00625
- GNIS feature ID: 2397925
- Website: ci.alda.ne.us

Alda is a village in Hall County, Nebraska, United States. The population was 647 at the 2020 census. It is part of the Grand Island, Nebraska Micropolitan Statistical Area.

== History ==
The Alda area was first settled in 1859. The village has the name of the first white child born within its borders. The town of Alda moved to its current site in 1873 in order to be on the railroad.

== Geography ==
According to the United States Census Bureau, the village has a total area of 0.57 square miles (1.48 km^{2}), all land.

== Demographics ==
Historical population
Census	Pop.	Note	%±
1930	153		—
1940	151		−1.3%
1950	190		25.8%
1960	229		20.5%
1970	456		99.1%
1980	601		31.8%
1990	540		−10.1%
2000	652		20.7%
2010	642		−1.5%
2020	647		0.8%
U.S. Decennial Census

=== 2010 census ===
As of the census of 2010, there were 642 people, 229 households, and 170 families residing in the village. The population density was 1,834.3 inhabitants per square mile (708.2/km^{2}). There were 253 housing units at an average density of 722.9 per square mile (279.1/km^{2}). The racial makeup of the village was 85.2% White, 0.9% African American, 13.7% from other races, and 0.2% from two or more races. Hispanic or Latino of any race were 16.0% of the population.

There were 229 households, of which 37.6% had children under the age of 18 living with them, 57.2% were married couples living together, 10.0% had a female householder with no husband present, 7.0% had a male householder with no wife present, and 25.8% were non-families. 19.7% of all households were made up of individuals, and 4.8% had someone living alone who was 65 years of age or older. The average household size was 2.80 and the average family size was 3.24.

The median age in the village was 33.5 years. 30.4% of residents were under the age of 18; 7.5% were between the ages of 18 and 24; 24% were from 25 to 44; 27.6% were from 45 to 64; and 10.4% were 65 years of age or older. The gender makeup of the village was 50.5% male and 49.5% female.

=== 2000 census ===
As of the census of 2000, there were 652 people, 237 households, and 172 families residing in the village. The population density was 1,859.3 inhabitants per square mile (717.9/km^{2}). There were 248 housing units at an average density of 707.2 per square mile (273.1/km^{2}). The racial makeup of the village was 95.55% White, 0.31% African American, 0.31% Native American, 0.15% Asian, 2.91% from other races, and 0.77% from two or more races. Hispanic or Latino of any race were 7.06% of the population.

There were 237 households, out of which 42.6% had children under the age of 18 living with them, 54.0% were married couples living together, 13.1% had a female householder with no husband present, and 27.4% were non-families. 21.5% of all households were made up of individuals, and 3.8% had someone living alone who was 65 years of age or older. The average household size was 2.75 and the average family size was 3.20.

In the village, the population was spread out, with 31.7% under the age of 18, 10.4% from 18 to 24, 31.6% from 25 to 44, 19.6% from 45 to 64, and 6.6% who were 65 years of age or older. The median age was 33 years. For every 100 females, there were 105.7 males. For every 100 females age 18 and over, there were 99.6 males.

As of 2000 the median income for a household in the village was $34,583, and the median income for a family was $39,219. Males had a median income of $24,375 versus $19,722 for females. The per capita income for the village was $18,259. About 7.6% of families and 8.6% of the population were below the poverty line, including 11.5% of those under age 18 and 1.9% of those age 65 or over.

== Economy ==
=== Business ===
- Merrick Machine Company, founded 1960.

== See also ==
- List of municipalities in Nebraska
