= South Platte Township, Hall County, Nebraska =

Township in Hall County, Nebraska

Coordinates: 40.743°N 98.433°W

South Platte Township is a township in Hall County, Nebraska, in the United States.

== History ==
It was organized in 1881.
