= Liederkranz (Grand Island, Nebraska) =

- U.S. National Register of Historic Places
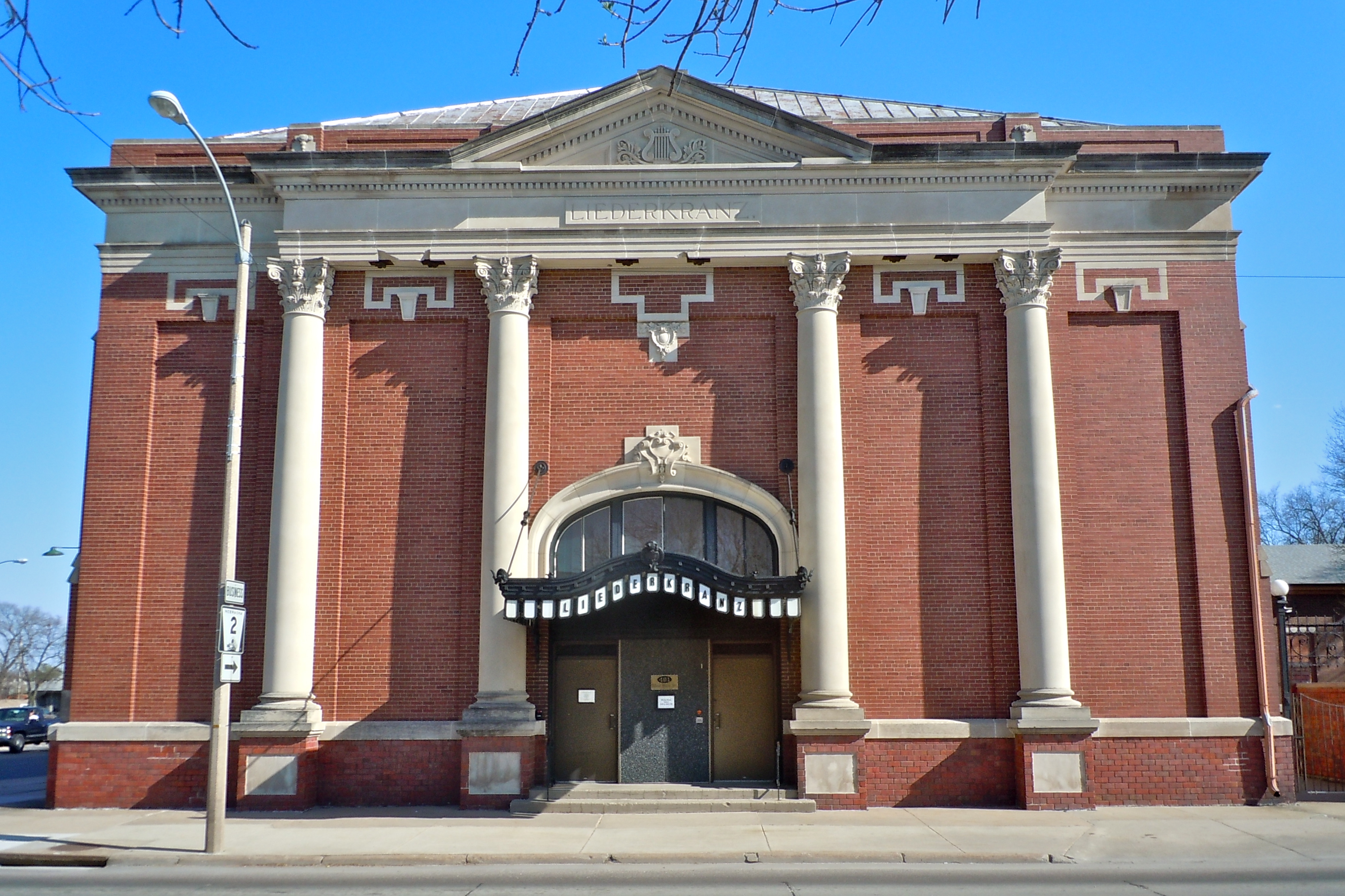
- The building in 2011

- Location within Nebraska Location within the United States
- Location: 401 West 1st Street, Grand Island, Nebraska
- Coordinates: 40°55′21″N 98°20′30″W
- Area: less than one acre
- Built: 1911
- Architect: Oscar Kirche
- Architectural style: Classical Revival
- NRHP reference No.: 78001701
- Added to NRHP: November 30, 1978

The Liederkranz hall is a historic building in Grand Island, Nebraska. It was built in 1911-1912 for the local Liederkranz, or German-language choir, founded in 1870. Moreover, "All meetings, programs, etc. were conducted in German until World War I when English became the official language" of the hall. The building was designed in the Classical Revival style by architect Oscar Kirche. It has been listed on the National Register of Historic Places since November 30, 1978. It is the only Liederkranz in Nebraska.
