= Prairie Creek Township, Merrick County, Nebraska =

Prairie Creek Township
- Township
- Location in Merrick County
- Coordinates: 41°06′26″N 098°12′43″W
- Country: United States
- State: Nebraska
- County: Merrick

Area
  - Total: 56.47 sq mi (146.26 km^{2})
  - Land: 56.47 sq mi (146.26 km^{2})
  - Water: 0 sq mi (0 km^{2}) 0%
- Elevation: 1,770 ft (540 m)

Population (2020)
  - Total: 328
  - Density: 5.81/sq mi (2.24/km^{2})
- GNIS feature ID: 0838199

Prairie Creek Township is one of eleven townships in Merrick County, Nebraska, United States. The population was 328 at the 2020 census. A 2021 estimate placed the township's population at 327.

== See also ==
- County government in Nebraska
