= Prairie Creek Township, Nance County, Nebraska =

Prairie Creek Township
- Township
- Location in Nance County
- Coordinates: 41°21′31″N 097°45′44″W
- Country: United States
- State: Nebraska
- County: Nance

Area
  - Total: 44.34 sq mi (114.85 km^{2})
  - Land: 44.10 sq mi (114.21 km^{2})
  - Water: 0.25 sq mi (0.64 km^{2}) 0.56%
- Elevation: 1,591 ft (485 m)

Population (2020)
  - Total: 117
  - Density: 2.65/sq mi (1.02/km^{2})
- GNIS feature ID: 0838200

Prairie Creek Township is one of twelve townships in Nance County, Nebraska, United States. The population was 117 at the 2020 census. A 2021 estimate placed the township's population at 117.

== See also ==
- County government in Nebraska
