= Prairie Creek Township, Hall County, Nebraska =

Coordinates: 41.003°N 98.436°W

Prairie Creek Township is a township in Hall County, Nebraska in the United States.

== History ==
It was organized in 1881.
