= Hall County, Nebraska =

County in Nebraska, United States

- County
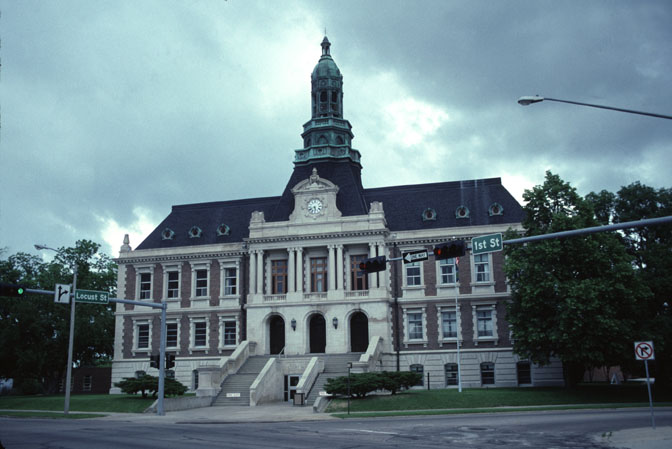
- The Hall County Courthouse in Grand Island

- Seal

- Location within the U.S. state of Nebraska
- Coordinates: 40.8660°N 98.5027°W
- Country: United States
- State: Nebraska
- Founded: November 4, 1858
- Named for: Augustus Hall
- Seat: Grand Island
- Largest city: Grand Island

Area
  - Total: 552.144 sq mi (1,430.05 km^{2})
  - Land: 546.529 sq mi (1,415.50 km^{2})
  - Water: 5.615 sq mi (14.54 km^{2}) 1.02%

Population (2020)
  - Total: 62,895
  - Estimate (2025): 63,633 ▲
  - Density: 115.08/sq mi (44.433/km^{2})
- Time zone: UTC−6 (Central)
  - Summer (DST): UTC−5 (CDT)
- Area code: 308
- Congressional district: 3rd
- Website: hallcountyne.gov
- • Nebraska county number 40 • Nebraska license plate prefix 08

Hall County is a county in the U.S. state of Nebraska. As of the 2020 census, the population was 62,895, and was estimated to be 63,633 in 2025, making it the fourth-most populous county in Nebraska. The county seat and the largest city is Grand Island.

Hall County is part of the Grand Island metropolitan area.

In the Nebraska license plate system, Hall County was represented by the prefix "8" (as it had the eighth-largest number of vehicles registered in the state when the license plate system was established in 1922).

== History ==
Hall County was created on November 4, 1858; it was named for Augustus Hall, an early judge of this territory.

== Geography ==
According to the United States Census Bureau, the county has a total area of 552.144 square miles (1,430.05 km^{2}), of which 546.529 square miles (1,415.50 km^{2}) is land and 5.615 square miles (14.54 km^{2}) (1.02%) is water. It is the 70th-largest county in Nebraska by total area.

The Platte River flows northeastward across the lower portion of Hall County; the South Loup River flows northeastward across the NW corner of the county; both flowing to their eventual drainage into the Missouri River.

Hall County has the highest density of tornado activity in Nebraska, with 121 tornadoes per 1,000 square miles (2,600 km^{2}), about 4 times the state average.

=== Major highways ===
- Interstate 80
- U.S. Route 30
- U.S. Route 34
- U.S. Route 281
- Nebraska Highway 2
- Nebraska Highway 11

=== Transit ===
- Burlington Trailways
- Express Arrow

=== Adjacent counties ===
- Merrick County – northeast
- Hamilton County – east
- Adams County – south
- Kearney County – southwest
- Howard County – north
- Buffalo County – west

=== Protected areas ===
- Cheyenne State Recreation Area
- Cornhusker State Wildlife Management Area
- Denman Island State Wildlife Management Area (part)
- Hannon Federal Waterfowl Production Area
- Loch Linda State Wildlife Management Area
- Martins Reach State Wildlife Management Area
- Mormon Island State Recreation Area
- Wood River West State Wildlife Management Area

== Demographics ==
Historical population
| Census | Pop. | Note | %± |
|---|---|---|---|
| 1860 | 116 | | — |
| 1870 | 1,057 | | 811.2% |
| 1880 | 8,572 | | 711.0% |
| 1890 | 16,513 | | 92.6% |
| 1900 | 17,206 | | 4.2% |
| 1910 | 20,361 | | 18.3% |
| 1920 | 23,720 | | 16.5% |
| 1930 | 27,117 | | 14.3% |
| 1940 | 27,523 | | 1.5% |
| 1950 | 32,186 | | 16.9% |
| 1960 | 35,757 | | 11.1% |
| 1970 | 42,851 | | 19.8% |
| 1980 | 47,690 | | 11.3% |
| 1990 | 48,925 | | 2.6% |
| 2000 | 53,534 | | 9.4% |
| 2010 | 58,607 | | 9.5% |
| 2020 | 62,895 | | 7.3% |
| 2025 (est.) | 63,633 | ▲ | 1.2% |
U.S. Decennial Census; 1790–1960 1900–1990; 1990–2000 2010–2020

As of the third quarter of 2025, the median home value in Hall County was $231,944.

As of the 2024 American Community Survey, there are 24,587 estimated households in Hall County with an average of 2.51 persons per household. The county has a median household income of $69,251. Approximately 14.1% of the county's population lives at or below the poverty line. Hall County has an estimated 65.5% employment rate, with 21.5% of the population holding a bachelor's degree or higher and 85.2% holding a high school diploma. There were 25,569 housing units at an average density of 46.78 per square mile (18.1/km^{2}).

The top five reported languages (people were allowed to report up to two languages, thus the figures will generally add to more than 100%) were English (72.2%), Spanish (24.9%), Indo-European (0.6%), Asian and Pacific Islander (0.6%), and Other (1.7%).

The median age in the county was 36.1 years.

Hall County, Nebraska – racial and ethnic composition Note: the US Census treats Hispanic/Latino as an ethnic category. This table excludes Latinos from the racial categories and assigns them to a separate category. Hispanics/Latinos may be of any race.
| Race / ethnicity (NH = non-Hispanic) | Pop. 1980 | Pop. 1990 | Pop. 2000 | Pop. 2010 | Pop. 2020 |
|---|---|---|---|---|---|
| White alone (NH) | 45,978 (96.41%) | 45,986 (93.99%) | 44,818 (83.72%) | 42,537 (72.58%) | 39,420 (62.68%) |
| Black or African American alone (NH) | 120 (0.25%) | 134 (0.27%) | 159 (0.30%) | 906 (1.55%) | 1,815 (2.89%) |
| Native American or Alaska Native alone (NH) | 114 (0.24%) | 139 (0.28%) | 132 (0.25%) | 231 (0.39%) | 215 (0.34%) |
| Asian alone (NH) | 103 (0.22%) | 521 (1.06%) | 574 (1.07%) | 579 (0.99%) | 688 (1.09%) |
| Pacific Islander alone (NH) | — | — | 17 (0.03%) | 34 (0.06%) | 25 (0.04%) |
| Other race alone (NH) | 20 (0.04%) | 29 (0.06%) | 28 (0.05%) | 95 (0.16%) | 187 (0.30%) |
| Mixed race or multiracial (NH) | — | — | 309 (0.58%) | 572 (0.98%) | 1,364 (2.17%) |
| Hispanic or Latino (any race) | 1,355 (2.84%) | 2,116 (4.32%) | 7,497 (14.00%) | 13,653 (23.30%) | 19,181 (30.50%) |
| Total | 47,690 (100.00%) | 48,925 (100.00%) | 53,534 (100.00%) | 58,607 (100.00%) | 62,895 (100.00%) |

=== 2024 estimate ===
As of the 2024 estimate, there were 62,869 people, 24,587 households, and _ families residing in the county. The population density was 115.03 inhabitants per square mile (44.4/km^{2}). There were 25,569 housing units at an average density of 46.78 per square mile (18.1/km^{2}). The racial makeup of the county was 88.3% White (59.3% NH White), 4.2% African American, 3.7% Native American, 1.4% Asian, 0.6% Pacific Islander, _% from some other races and 1.8% from two or more races. Hispanic or Latino people of any race were 34.7% of the population.

=== 2020 census ===
As of the 2020 census, there were 62,895 people, 23,805 households, and 15,655 families residing in the county. The population density was 115.08 inhabitants per square mile (44.4/km^{2}). There were 25,159 housing units at an average density of 46.03 per square mile (17.8/km^{2}). The racial makeup of the county was 69.48% White, 3.05% African American, 1.45% Native American, 1.16% Asian, 0.06% Pacific Islander, 15.42% from some other races and 9.38% from two or more races. Hispanic or Latino people of any race were 30.50% of the population.

The median age was 36.0 years. 27.0% of residents were under the age of 18 and 15.4% of residents were 65 years of age or older. For every 100 females there were 100.2 males, and for every 100 females age 18 and over there were 97.9 males age 18 and over.

87.6% of residents lived in urban areas, while 12.4% lived in rural areas.

There were 23,805 households in the county, of which 34.2% had children under the age of 18 living with them and 25.5% had a female householder with no spouse or partner present. About 28.0% of all households were made up of individuals and 11.3% had someone living alone who was 65 years of age or older.

There were 25,159 housing units, of which 5.4% were vacant. Among occupied housing units, 60.7% were owner-occupied and 39.3% were renter-occupied. The homeowner vacancy rate was 1.1% and the rental vacancy rate was 5.9%.

=== 2010 census ===
As of the 2010 census, there were 58,607 people, 22,196 households, and 14,329 families residing in the county. The population density was 107.23 inhabitants per square mile (41.4/km^{2}). There were 23,549 housing units at an average density of 43.09 per square mile (16.6/km^{2}). The racial makeup of the county was 82.61% White, 1.75% African American, 0.90% Native American, 1.04% Asian, 0.19% Pacific Islander, 11.43% from some other races and 2.09% from two or more races. Hispanic or Latino people of any race were 23.30% of the population.

=== 2000 census ===
As of the 2000 census, there were 53,534 people, 20,356 households, and 14,086 families residing in the county. The population density was 97.95 inhabitants per square mile (37.8/km^{2}). There were 21,574 housing units at an average density of 39.47 per square mile (15.2/km^{2}). The racial makeup of the county was 88.67% White, 0.36% African American, 0.31% Native American, 1.09% Asian, 0.14% Pacific Islander, 8.19% from some other races and 1.24% from two or more races. Hispanic or Latino people of any race were 14.00% of the population.

There were 20,356 households, out of which 34.80% had children under the age of 18 living with them, 55.90% were married couples living together, 9.70% had a female householder with no husband present, and 30.80% were non-families. 25.50% of all households were made up of individuals, and 10.50% had someone living alone who was 65 years of age or older. The average household size was 2.57 and the average family size was 3.08.

The county population contained 27.20% under the age of 18, 8.90% from 18 to 24, 28.30% from 25 to 44, 21.70% from 45 to 64, and 14.00% who were 65 years of age or older. The median age was 36 years. For every 100 females, there were 98.40 males. For every 100 females age 18 and over, there were 96.20 males.

The median income for a household in the county was $36,972, and the median income for a family was $43,963. Males had a median income of $29,158 versus $20,576 for females. The per capita income for the county was $17,386. 12.00% of the population and 9.20% of families were below the poverty line. Out of the total population, 15.50% of those under the age of 18 and 8.30% of those 65 and older were living below the poverty line.

== Communities ==
=== Cities ===
- Grand Island
- Wood River

=== Villages ===
- Alda
- Cairo
- Doniphan
- Shelton (part)

=== Unincorporated communities ===
- Abbott
- Cameron
- Hansen

== Politics ==
Hall County has been a Republican Party stronghold for most of its history at the presidential level. In only four presidential elections in its history has a Democratic Party candidate carried the county, the most recent being Lyndon B. Johnson in 1964. Additionally, no Democrat has ever received more than 60% of the vote in Hall County.

| Political Party | Number of registered voters (April 1, 2026) | Percent |
|---|---|---|
| Republican | 17,705 | 53.95% |
| Independent | 7,238 | 22.05% |
| Democratic | 7,181 | 21.88% |
| Libertarian | 453 | 1.38% |
| Legal Marijuana Now | 243 | 0.74% |
| Total | 32,820 | 100.00% |

United States presidential election results for Hall County, Nebraska
| Year | Republican | | Democratic | | Third party(ies) | |
| Year | No. | % | No. | % | No. | % |
|---|---|---|---|---|---|---|
| 1900 | 2,017 | 52.15% | 1,766 | 45.66% | 85 | 2.20% |
| 1904 | 2,508 | 65.69% | 817 | 21.40% | 493 | 12.91% |
| 1908 | 2,241 | 47.87% | 2,229 | 47.62% | 211 | 4.51% |
| 1912 | 1,047 | 23.73% | 2,085 | 47.26% | 1,280 | 29.01% |
| 1916 | 2,555 | 48.54% | 2,483 | 47.17% | 226 | 4.29% |
| 1920 | 4,719 | 66.25% | 1,724 | 24.20% | 680 | 9.55% |
| 1924 | 4,040 | 47.39% | 1,863 | 21.85% | 2,622 | 30.76% |
| 1928 | 6,862 | 66.58% | 3,391 | 32.90% | 53 | 0.51% |
| 1932 | 3,743 | 35.67% | 6,266 | 59.72% | 483 | 4.60% |
| 1936 | 5,146 | 43.57% | 6,295 | 53.30% | 369 | 3.12% |
| 1940 | 7,412 | 61.26% | 4,687 | 38.74% | 0 | 0.00% |
| 1944 | 7,651 | 61.61% | 4,768 | 38.39% | 0 | 0.00% |
| 1948 | 5,694 | 55.37% | 4,590 | 44.63% | 0 | 0.00% |
| 1952 | 10,435 | 69.37% | 4,608 | 30.63% | 0 | 0.00% |
| 1956 | 9,536 | 66.45% | 4,815 | 33.55% | 0 | 0.00% |
| 1960 | 9,763 | 63.98% | 5,496 | 36.02% | 0 | 0.00% |
| 1964 | 6,715 | 44.80% | 8,273 | 55.20% | 0 | 0.00% |
| 1968 | 8,457 | 61.01% | 4,571 | 32.98% | 833 | 6.01% |
| 1972 | 10,987 | 72.26% | 4,218 | 27.74% | 0 | 0.00% |
| 1976 | 10,935 | 62.90% | 6,079 | 34.96% | 372 | 2.14% |
| 1980 | 12,166 | 68.13% | 4,422 | 24.76% | 1,269 | 7.11% |
| 1984 | 13,193 | 73.47% | 4,655 | 25.92% | 108 | 0.60% |
| 1988 | 12,062 | 63.41% | 6,853 | 36.02% | 108 | 0.57% |
| 1992 | 9,341 | 44.67% | 5,558 | 26.58% | 6,014 | 28.76% |
| 1996 | 10,183 | 52.45% | 6,708 | 34.55% | 2,525 | 13.00% |
| 2000 | 11,803 | 63.64% | 5,952 | 32.09% | 791 | 4.27% |
| 2004 | 14,592 | 68.98% | 6,228 | 29.44% | 334 | 1.58% |
| 2008 | 12,977 | 61.01% | 7,855 | 36.93% | 439 | 2.06% |
| 2012 | 12,646 | 62.51% | 7,161 | 35.40% | 422 | 2.09% |
| 2016 | 14,408 | 65.31% | 6,282 | 28.48% | 1,370 | 6.21% |
| 2020 | 16,189 | 66.21% | 7,681 | 31.42% | 580 | 2.37% |
| 2024 | 15,566 | 67.97% | 6,956 | 30.37% | 379 | 1.65% |

== Education ==
School districts include:

- Adams Central Public Schools #90, Hastings
- Aurora Public Schools #504, Aurora
- Centura Public Schools #100, Cairo
- Doniphan-Trumbull Public Schools #126, Doniphan
- Grand Island Public Schools #, Grand Island
- Kenesaw Public Schools #3, Kenesaw
- Northwest Public Schools #82, Grand Island
- Shelton Public Schools #19, Shelton
- Wood River Rural Schools #83, Wood River

== See also ==
- National Register of Historic Places listings in Hall County, Nebraska
