= 2022 Nebraska Legislature election =

- November 8, 2022; Officially nonpartisan

25 of the 49 seats in the Nebraska Legislature 25 (Note: In Nebraska, a two-thirds vote of all members is required to overcome a filibuster. Thus, 33 votes are required to hold a filibuster-proof majority.) seats needed for a majority
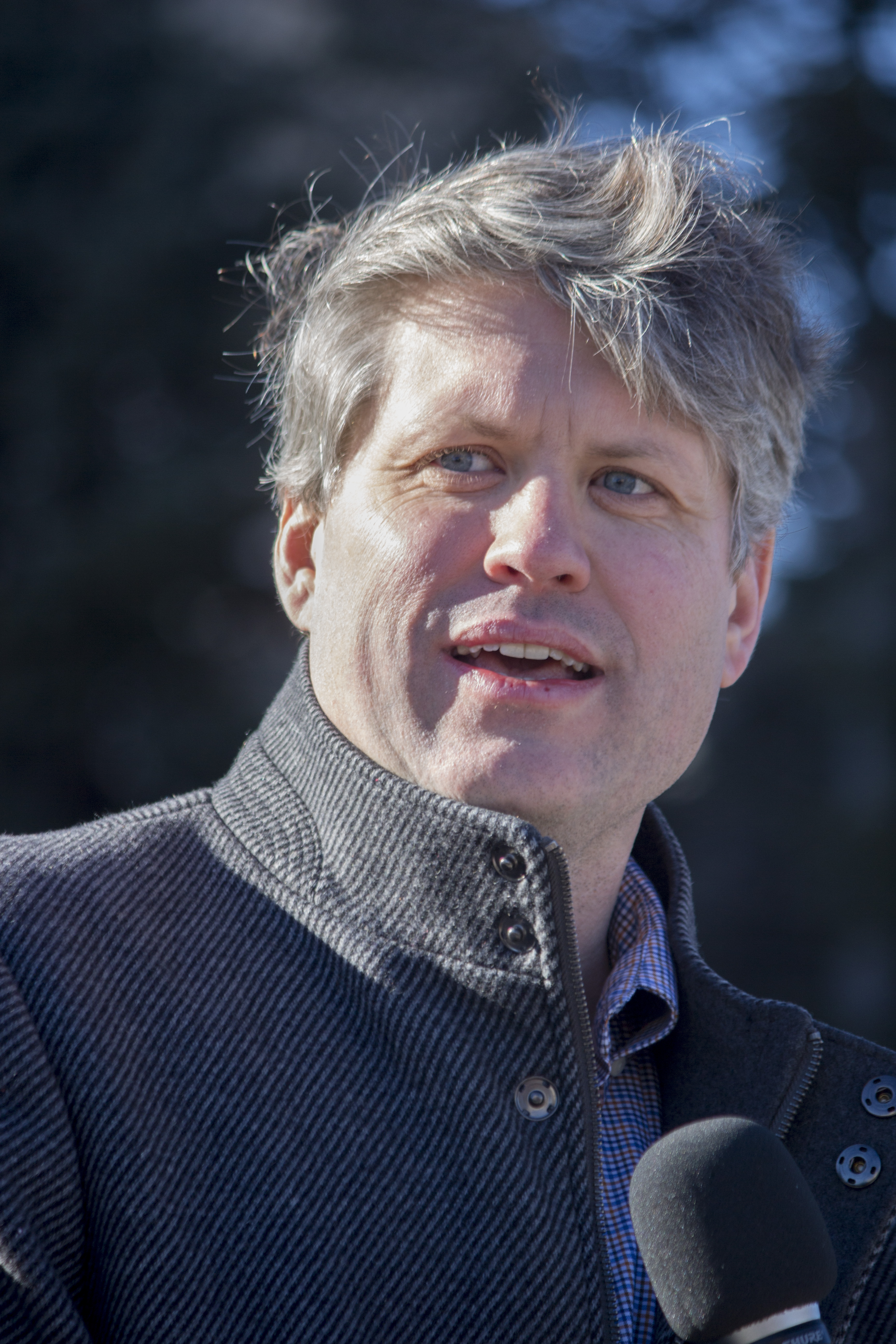
	Majority party	Minority party
		Dem
Leader	Mike Hilgers (retired)	None
Party	Republican	Democratic
Leader since	January 6, 2021
Leader's seat	21st district
Last election	32	17
Seats won	32	17
Seat change	Steady	Steady
Popular vote	222,655	89,093
Percentage	68.08%	27.24%
Swing	▲9.10pp	▼12.78pp
- Democratic gain Republican gain Democratic hold Republican hold 50–60% 60–70% 70–80% 80–90% >90% 50–60% 60–70%
Speaker before election
Mike Hilgers
Republican
Elected Speaker
John Arch
Republican

The 2022 Nebraska State Legislature elections took place as part of the biennial United States elections. Nebraska voters elected state senators (Note: Although Nebraska's legislature is unicameral, the officeholders are called Senators.) in the 24 even-numbered seats of the 49 (Note: The odd-numbered districts were elected in 2020 and will be up for election again in 2024.) legislative districts in the Nebraska Unicameral as well as in a special election for the 31st District. State senators serve four-year terms in the unicameral Nebraska Legislature.

== Retirements ==
=== Term limited ===
==== Democrats ====
1. District 26: Matt Hansen
2. District 28: Patty Pansing Brooks
3. District 46: Adam Morfeld

==== Republicans ====
1. District 4: Robert Hilkemann
2. District 18: Brett Lindstrom
3. District 20: John S. McCollister
4. District 24: Mark Kolterman
5. District 34: Curt Friesen
6. District 36: Matt Williams
7. District 42: Mike Groene
8. District 44: Dan Hughes
9. District 48: John Stinner

=== Not seeking reelection ===
==== Democrats ====
1. District 12: Steve Lathrop retired.

==== Republicans ====
1. District 40: Tim Gragert retired.

== Predictions ==
Source	Ranking	As of
CNalysis	Solid R	October 3, 2022

== Close races ==
District	Winner	Party	Margin
4	R. Brad von Gillern	Republican	4.82%
10	Wendy DeBoer	Democratic	6.94%
12	Merv Riepe	Republican (flip)	4.62%
20	John Fredrickson	Democratic (flip)	0.5%
26	George Dungan III	Democratic	1.92%
31 (special)	Kathleen Kauth	Republican	5.0%
42	Mike Jacobson	Republican	2.78%
46	Danielle Conrad	Democratic	2.96%
48	Brian Hardin	Republican	4.3%

== Race by district ==
- Note: All elections are technically non-partisan in the State Legislature; therefore, parties listed here are from candidates' websites and official party endorsement lists. Candidates all appear on the ballot as nonpartisan.
  - Candidates endorsed by the Republican Party:
  - Candidates endorsed by the Democratic Party:

=== District 2 ===
2022 Nebraska's 2nd Legislature District election
- November 8, 2022
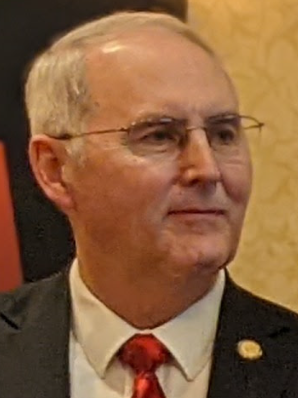

Nominee	Robert Clements	Sarah Slattery
Party	Republican	Democratic
Popular vote	9,261	7,117
Percentage	56.55%	43.45%
Senator before election
Robert Clements
Republican
Elected Senator
Robert Clements
Republican

The incumbent was Republican Robert Clements, who ran for re-election.

==== Declared ====
- Janet Chung, former chair of the Lancaster County Democratic Party
- Robert Clements, banker (incumbent)
- Sarah Slattery, chef and school food program manager
- Schuyler Windham, lawyer and entrepreneur

==== Endorsements ====
Janet Chung

Organizations

- Nebraska State AFL–CIO
- Sierra Club Nebraska chapter
Sarah Slattery

Organizations

- National Association of Social Workers
- Nebraska State Education Association
- Run For Something
Schuyler Windham

Individuals

- Laura Ebke, former Nebraska State Senator

==== Disqualified/withdrawn ====
- Michelle Bates, corporate executive assistant

Predictions

Source	Ranking	As of
CNalysis	Solid R	October 3, 2023

==== Results ====
Nebraska's 2nd Legislative District election, 2022
Primary election
Party	Candidate	Votes	%
Republican	Robert Clements (incumbent)	5,154	53.69
Democratic	Sarah Slattery	2,221	23.14
Democratic	Janet Chung	1,674	17.44
Libertarian	Schuyler Windham	550	5.73
Total votes		9,599	100.00
General election
Republican	Robert Clements (incumbent)	9,261	56.55
Democratic	Sarah Slattery	7,117	43.45
Total votes		16,378	100.00
Republican hold			

=== District 4 ===
2022 Nebraska's 4th Legislature District election
- November 8, 2022

Nominee	R. Brad von Gillern	Cindy Maxwell-Ostdiek
Party	Republican	Independent
Alliance		Democratic
Popular vote	8,710	7,908
Percentage	52.41%	47.59%
Senator before election
Robert Hilkemann
Republican
Elected Senator
R. Brad von Gillern
Republican

The incumbent was Republican Robert Hilkemann, who did not run for re-election.

==== Declared ====
- Cindy Maxwell-Ostdiek
- R. Brad von Gillern

Predictions

Source	Ranking	As of
CNalysis	Likely R	October 3, 2023

==== Results ====
Nebraska's 4th Legislative District election, 2022
Primary election
Party	Candidate	Votes	%
Republican	R. Brad von Gillern	5,055	52.09
Nonpartisan	Cindy Maxwell-Ostdiek	4,649	47.91
Total votes		9,704	100.00
General election
Republican	R. Brad von Gillern	8,710	52.41
Nonpartisan	Cindy Maxwell-Ostdiek	7,908	47.59
Total votes		16,618	100.00
Republican hold			

=== District 6 ===
2022 Nebraska's 6th Legislature District election
- November 8, 2022

Nominee	Machaela Cavanaugh	Christian Mirch
Party	Democratic	Republican
Popular vote	7,969	6,360
Percentage	55.61%	44.39%
Senator before election
Machaela Cavanaugh
Democratic
Elected Senator
Machaela Cavanaugh
Democratic

The incumbent was Democratic Machaela Cavanaugh, who ran for re-election.

==== Declared ====
- Machaela Cavanaugh, nonprofit development director (incumbent)
- Elizabeth Hallgren
- Christian Mirch, clerk for the chief justice Michael G. Heavican

Predictions

Source	Ranking	As of
CNalysis	Lean D	October 3, 2023

==== Results ====
Nebraska's 6th Legislative District election, 2022
Primary election
Party	Candidate	Votes	%
Democratic	Machaela Cavanaugh (incumbent)	4,355	47.82
Republican	Christian Mirch	3,449	37.87
Republican	Elizabeth Hallgren	1,304	14.32
Total votes		9,108	100.00
General election
Democratic	Machaela Cavanaugh (incumbent)	7,969	55.61
Republican	Christian Mirch	6,360	44.39
Total votes		14,329	100.00
Democratic hold			

=== District 8 ===
2022 Nebraska's 8th Legislature District election
- November 8, 2022
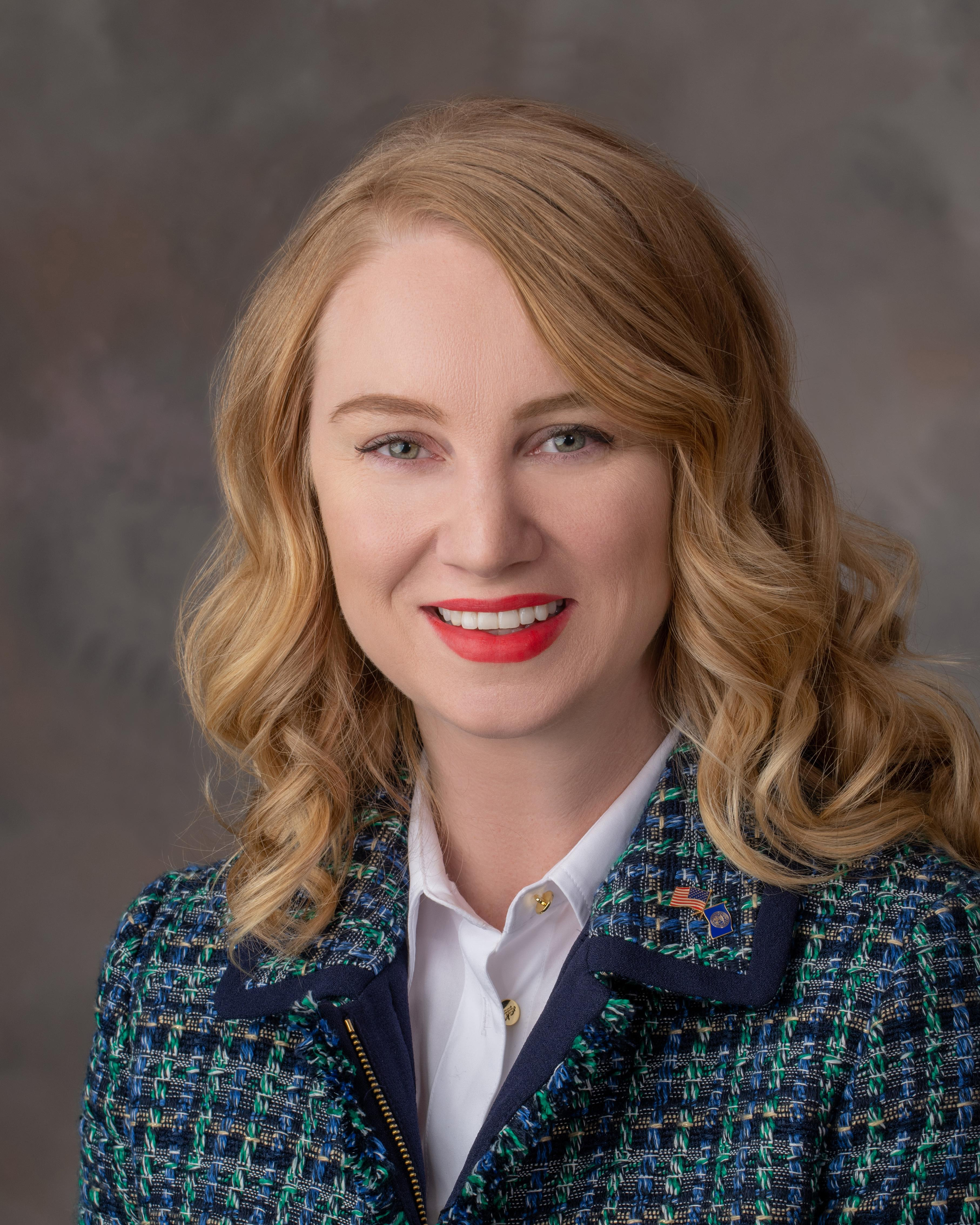

Nominee	Megan Hunt	Marilyn Arant Asher
Party	Democratic	Republican
Popular vote	9,322	4,116
Percentage	69.37%	30.63%
Senator before election
Megan Hunt
Democratic
Elected Senator
Megan Hunt
Democratic

The incumbent was Democratic Megan Hunt, who ran for re-election.

Declared

- Marilyn Arant Asher
- Megan Hunt, small business owner (incumbent)
- Katie Opitz

Predictions

Source	Ranking	As of
CNalysis	Solid D	October 3, 2023

==== Results ====
Nebraska's 8th Legislative District election, 2022
Primary election
Party	Candidate	Votes	%
Democratic	Megan Hunt (incumbent)	5,225	66.26
Republican	Marilyn Arant Asher	1,846	23.41
Republican	Katie Opitz	815	10.33
Total votes		7,886	100.00
General election
Democratic	Megan Hunt (incumbent)	9,322	69.37
Republican	Marilyn Arant Asher	4,116	30.63
Total votes		13,438	100.00
Democratic hold			

=== District 10 ===
2022 Nebraska's 10th Legislature District election
- November 8, 2022

Nominee	Wendy DeBoer	Lou Ann Goding
Party	Democratic	Republican
Popular vote	7,120	6,197
Percentage	53.47%	46.53%
Senator before election
Wendy DeBoer
Democratic
Elected Senator
Wendy DeBoer
Democratic

The incumbent was Democratic Wendy DeBoer, who ran for re-election.

Declared

- Wendy DeBoer, lawyer and academic (incumbent)
- Lou Ann Goding, former Omaha Public Schools board president

Predictions

Source	Ranking	As of
CNalysis	Tilt (flip)	November 3, 2024

==== Results ====
Nebraska's 10th Legislative District election, 2022
Primary election
Party	Candidate	Votes	%
Democratic	Wendy DeBoer (incumbent)	4,159	53.46
Republican	Lou Ann Goding	3,621	46.54
Total votes		7,780	100.00
General election
Democratic	Wendy DeBoer	7,120	53.47
Republican	Lou Ann Goding	6,197	46.53
Total votes		13,317	100.00
Democratic hold			

=== District 12 ===
2022 Nebraska's 12th Legislature District election
- November 8, 2022
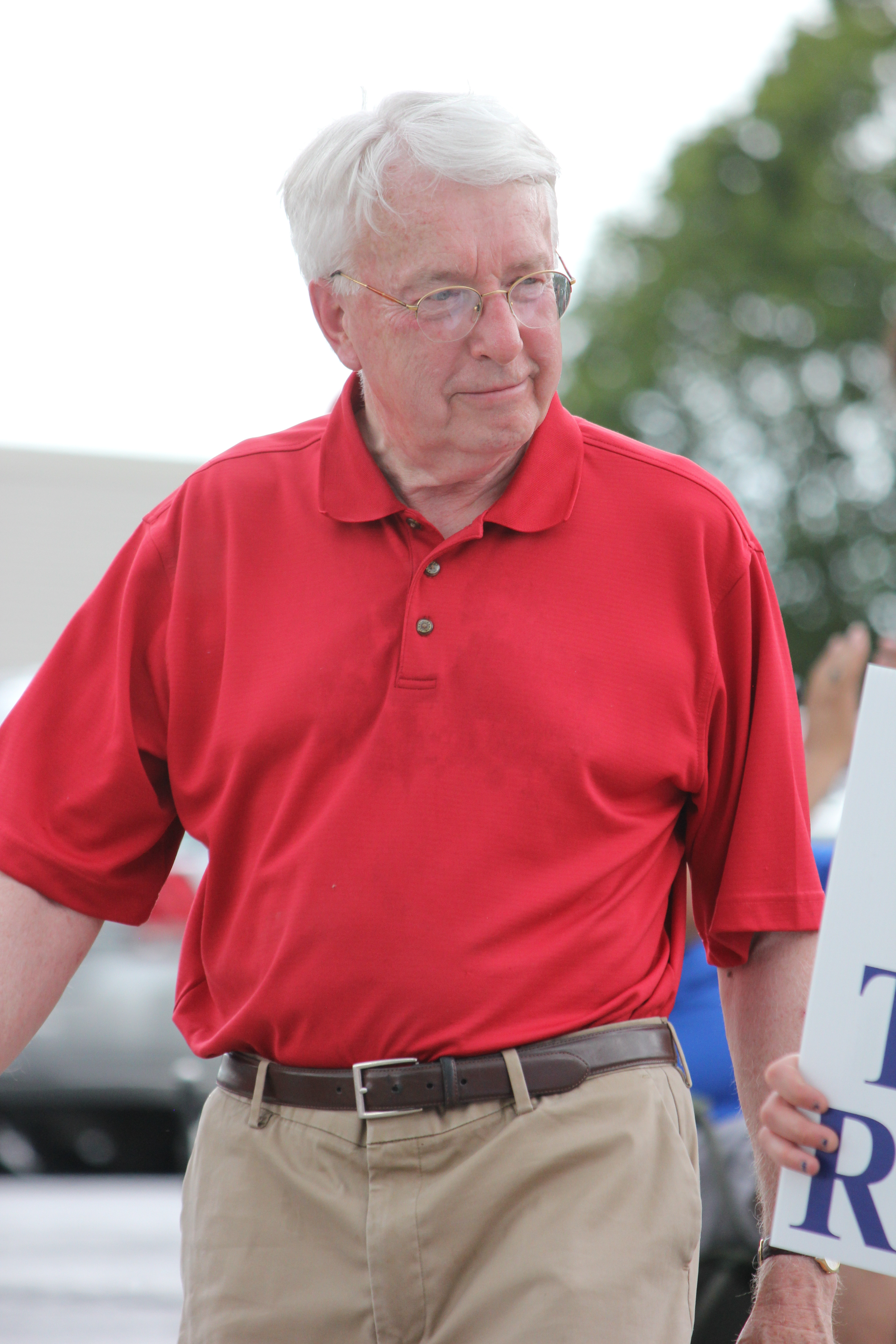

Nominee	Merv Riepe	Robin Richards
Party	Republican	Democratic
Popular vote	5,942	5,418
Percentage	52.31%	47.69%
Senator before election
Steve Lathrop
Democratic
Elected Senator
Merv Riepe
Republican

The incumbent was Democratic Steve Lathrop, who did not run for re-election.

Declared

- Bob Borgeson, union leader
- Haile Kucera, small business owner
- Robin Richards, Vice President of the Ralston Public Schools Board
- Merv Riepe, former state senator

Did not file

- Bryce Lukowski, conservative activist

Predictions

Source	Ranking	As of
CNalysis	Lean R	October 3, 2023

==== Results ====
Nebraska's 12th Legislative District election, 2022
Primary election
Party	Candidate	Votes	%
Republican	Merv Riepe	3,038	44.97
Democratic	Robin Richards	1,369	20.27
Republican	Haile Kucera	1,185	17.54
Republican	Bob Borgeson	1,163	17.22
Total votes		6,755	100.00
General election
Republican	Merv Riepe	5,942	52.31
Democratic	Robin Richards	5,418	47.69
Total votes		11,360	100.00
Republican gain from Democratic			

=== District 14 ===
2022 Nebraska's 14th Legislature District election
- November 8, 2022
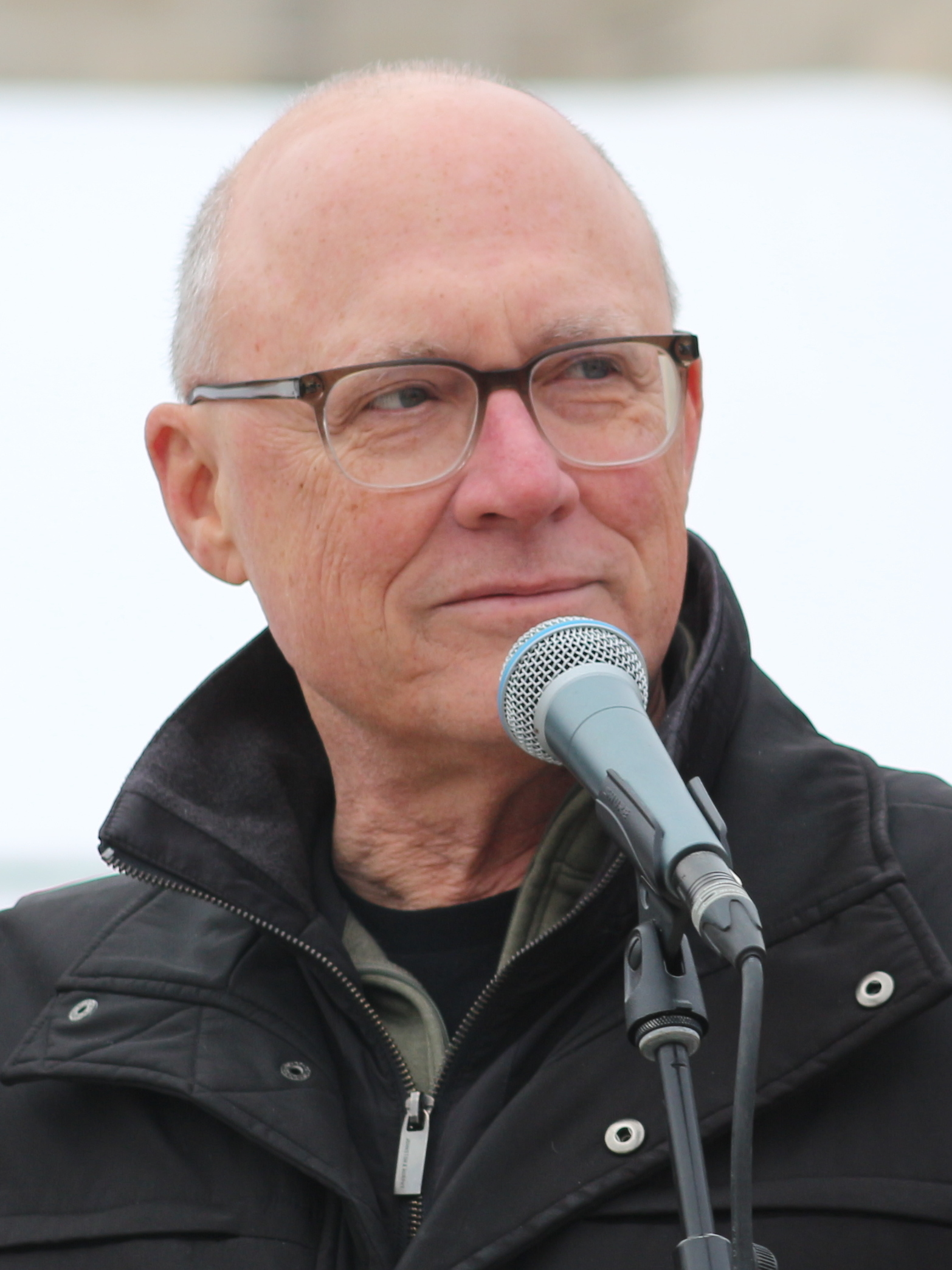

Nominee	John Arch	Cori Villegas
Party	Republican	Democratic
Popular vote	9,261	4,524
Percentage	62.70%	37.30%
Senator before election
John Arch
Republican
Elected Senator
John Arch
Republican

The incumbent was Republican John Arch, who ran for re-election.

Declared

- John Arch, former healthcare executive (incumbent)
- Rob Plugge, software developer
- Cori Villegas, healthcare worker and after-school program volunteer

Predictions

Source	Ranking	As of
CNalysis	Likely R	October 3, 2023

==== Results ====
Nebraska's 14th Legislative District election, 2022
Primary election
Party	Candidate	Votes	%
Republican	John Arch (incumbent)	3,367	57.74
Democratic	Cori Villegas	1,474	25.28
Democratic	Rob Plugge	990	16.98
Total votes		5,831	100.00
General election
Republican	John Arch (incumbent)	7,606	62.70
Democratic	Cori Villegas	4,524	37.30
Total votes		12,130	100.00
Republican hold			

=== District 16 ===
2022 Nebraska's 16th Legislature District election
- November 8, 2022
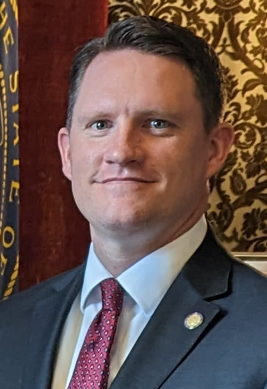

Nominee	Ben Hansen	Connie Petersen
Party	Republican	Republican
Popular vote	9,744	4,123
Percentage	70.72%	29.73%
Senator before election
Ben Hansen
Republican
Elected Senator
Ben Hansen
Republican

The incumbent was Republican Ben Hansen, who ran for re-election.

Declared

- Ben Hansen, chiropractor (incumbent)
- Connie Petersen, psychologist

Predictions

Source	Ranking	As of
CNalysis	Solid R	October 3, 2023

==== Results ====
Nebraska's 16th Legislative District election, 2022
Primary election
Party	Candidate	Votes	%
Republican	Ben Hansen (incumbent)	6,470	73.98
Republican	Connie Petersen	2,276	26.02
Total votes		8,746	100.00
General election
Republican	Ben Hansen (incumbent)	9,744	70.27
Republican	Connie Petersen	4,123	29.73
Total votes		13,867	100.00
Republican hold			

=== District 18 ===
2022 Nebraska's 18th Legislature District election
- November 8, 2022

Nominee	Christy Armendariz	Michael Young
Party	Republican	Democratic
Popular vote	7,430	5,784
Percentage	56.23%	43.77%
Senator before election
Brett Lindstrom
Republican
Elected Senator
Christy Armendariz
Republican

The incumbent was Republican Brett Lindstrom, who did not run for re-election.

Declared

- Christy Armendariz
- Clarice Jackson, nonprofit CEO
- Michael Young, technology consultant

Predictions

Source	Ranking	As of
CNalysis	Tilt R	November 3, 2024

==== Results ====
Nebraska's 18th Legislative District election, 2022
Primary election
Party	Candidate	Votes	%
Democratic	Michael Young	2,498	34.53
Republican	Christy Armendariz	2,378	32.87
Republican	Clarice Jackson	2,358	32.60
Total votes		7,234	100.00
General election
Republican	Christy Armendariz	7,430	56.23
Democratic	Michael Young	5,784	43.77
Total votes		13,214	100.00
Republican hold			

=== District 20 ===
2022 Nebraska's 20th Legislature District election
- November 8, 2022

Nominee	John Fredrickson	Stu Dornan
Party	Democratic	Republican
Popular vote	8,139	8,057
Percentage	50.25%	49.75%
Senator before election
John McCollister
Republican
Elected Senator
John Fredrickson
Democratic

The incumbent was Republican John McCollister, who ran for re-election.

==== Declared ====
- Stu Dornan, attorney
- John Fredrickson, mental health provider and adjunct professor
- Julie Fredrickson, realtor

Predictions

Source	Ranking	As of
CNalysis	Tilt R	November 2, 2024

==== Results ====
Nebraska's 20th Legislative District election, 2022
Primary election
Party	Candidate	Votes	%
Republican	Stu Dornan	4,431	42.60
Democratic	John Fredrickson	3,686	35.44
Republican	Julie Fredrickson	2,284	21.96
Total votes		10,401	100.00
General election
Democratic	John Fredrickson	8,139	50.25
Republican	Stu Dornan	8,057	49.75
Total votes		16,196	100.00
Democratic gain from Republican			

=== District 22 ===
2022 Nebraska's 22nd Legislature District election
- November 8, 2022

Nominee	Mike Moser	Roy M. Zach
Party	Republican	Independent
Alliance		Democratic
Popular vote	9,561	2,355
Percentage	80.24%	19.76%
Senator before election
Mike Moser
Republican
Elected Senator
Mike Moser
Republican

The incumbent was Republican Mike Moser, who did not run for re-election.

Declared

- Mike Goos, school psychologist and candidate for Nebraska State Board of Education District 3 in 2020
- Mike Moser, small business owner (incumbent)
- Roy M. Zach, candidate for this seat in 2010

Predictions

Source	Ranking	As of
CNalysis	Solid R	October 3, 2023

==== Results ====
Nebraska's 22nd Legislative District election, 2022
Primary election
Party	Candidate	Votes	%
Republican	Mike Moser (incumbent)	6,549	76.14
Nonpartisan	Roy M. Zach	1,054	12.25
Democratic	Mike Goos	998	11.60
Total votes		8,601	100.00
General election
Republican	Mike Moser (incumbent)	9,561	80.24
Nonpartisan	Roy M. Zach	2,355	19.76
Total votes		11,916	100.00
Republican hold			

=== District 24 ===
2022 Nebraska's 24th Legislature District election
- November 8, 2022
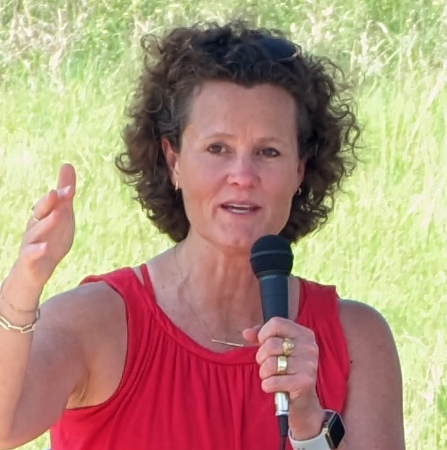

Nominee	Jana Hughes	Patrick Hotovy
Party	Republican	Republican
Popular vote	7,551	6,159
Percentage	55.08%	44.92%
Senator before election
Mark Kolterman
Republican
Elected Senator
Jana Hughes
Republican

The incumbent was Republican Mark Kolterman, who did not run for re-election.

Declared

- Patrick Hotovy, physician
- Jana Hughes, member of the Seward Public School Board

Predictions

Source	Ranking	As of
CNalysis	Solid R	October 3, 2023

==== Results ====
Nebraska's 24th Legislative District election, 2022
Primary election
Party	Candidate	Votes	%
Republican	Patrick Hotovy	4,588	50.4
Republican	Jana Hughes	4,516	49.6
Total votes		9,104	100.0
General election
Republican	Jana Hughes	7,551	55.08
Republican	Patrick Hotovy	6,159	44.92
Total votes		13,710	100.00
Republican hold			

=== District 26 ===
2022 Nebraska's 26th Legislature District election
- November 8, 2022

Nominee	George Dungan III	Russ Barger
Party	Democratic	Republican
Popular vote	5,960	5,736
Percentage	50.96%	49.04%
Senator before election
Matt Hansen
Democratic
Elected Senator
George Dungan III
Democratic

The incumbent was Democratic Matt Hansen, who did not run for re-election.

Declared

- Russ Barger
- George Dungan III, public defense attorney
- Bob Van Valkenburg, business owner and perennial candidate
- Larry Weixelman, candidate for this seat in 2014

==== Endorsements ====
George Dungan III

Elected officials

- Tom Beckius, Lincoln city councilman
- John Cavanaugh, Nebraska State Senator
- Wendy DeBoer, Nebraska State Senator
- Matt Hansen, Nebraska State Senator
- Bennie Shobe, Lincoln city councilman
- Tony Vargas, Nebraska State Senator and candidate for Nebraska's 2nd congressional district in the 2022 United States House of Representatives elections in Nebraska

Organizations

- Nebraska State AFL–CIO
- Nebraska State Education Association
- Planned Parenthood Advocates of Nebraska
- Sierra Club Nebraska chapter

Predictions

Source	Ranking	As of
CNalysis	Likely D	October 3, 2023

==== Results ====
Nebraska's 26th Legislative District election, 2022
Primary election
Party	Candidate	Votes	%
Republican	Russ Barger	2,833	40.99
Democratic	George Dungan III	2,543	36.79
Nonpartisan	Larry Weixelman	816	11.81
Nonpartisan	Bob Van Valkenburg	720	10.42
Total votes		6,912	100.00
General election
Democratic	George Dungan III	5,960	50.96
Republican	Russ Barger	5,736	49.04
Total votes		11,696	100.00
Democratic hold			

=== District 28 ===
2022 Nebraska's 28th Legislature District election
- November 8, 2022

Nominee	Jane Raybould	Roy Christensen
Party	Democratic	Republican
Popular vote	7,879	3,977
Percentage	66.46%	33.54%
Senator before election
Patty Pansing Brooks
Democratic
Elected Senator
Jane Raybould
Democratic

The incumbent was Democratic Patty Pansing Brooks, who did not run for re-election.

==== Declared ====
- Roy Christensen, former Lincoln City Councilman
- Jane Raybould, Lincoln City Councilwoman, nominee for U.S. Senate in 2018 and nominee for Lieutenant Governor of Nebraska in 2014

==== Withdrew ====
- Nancy Petitto, nonprofit program director and affordable housing advocate

==== Endorsements ====
Jane Raybould

Individuals

- Patty Pansing Brooks, Nebraska State Senator

Predictions

Source	Ranking	As of
CNalysis	Solid D	October 3, 2023

==== Results ====
Nebraska's 28th Legislative District election, 2022
Primary election
Party	Candidate	Votes	%
Democratic	Jane Raybould	4,919	64.49
Republican	Roy Christensen	2,708	35.51
Total votes		7,627	100.00
General election
Democratic	Jane Raybould	7,879	66.46
Republican	Roy Christensen	3,977	33.54
Total votes		11,856	100.00
Democratic hold			

=== District 30 ===
2022 Nebraska's 30th Legislature District election
- November 8, 2022
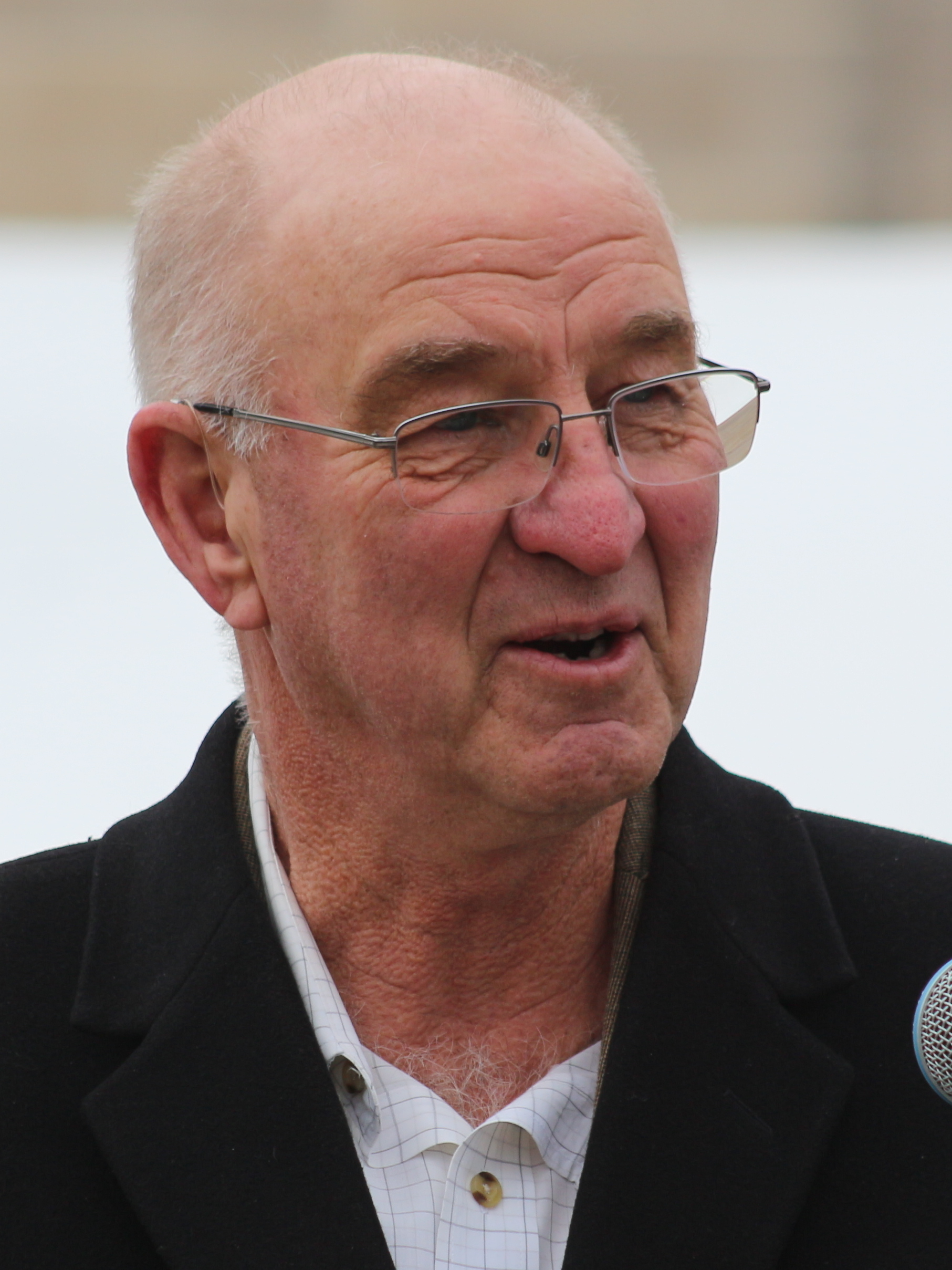
Nominee	Myron Dorn
Party	Republican
Popular vote	12,603
Percentage	100.00%
Senator before election
Myron Dorn
Republican
Elected Senator
Myron Dorn
Republican

The incumbent was Republican Myron Dorn, who ran for re-election.

Declared

- Myron Dorn, farmer (incumbent)

Predictions

Source	Ranking	As of
CNalysis	Solid R	October 3, 2023

==== Results ====
Nebraska's 30th Legislative District election, 2022
Primary election
Party	Candidate	Votes	%
Republican	Myron Dorn (incumbent)	9,024	100.00
Total votes		9,024	100.00
General election
Republican	Myron Dorn (incumbent)	12,603	100.00
Total votes		12,603	100.00
Republican hold			

=== District 31 (Special) ===
2022 Nebraska's 31st Special Legislature District election
- November 8, 2022
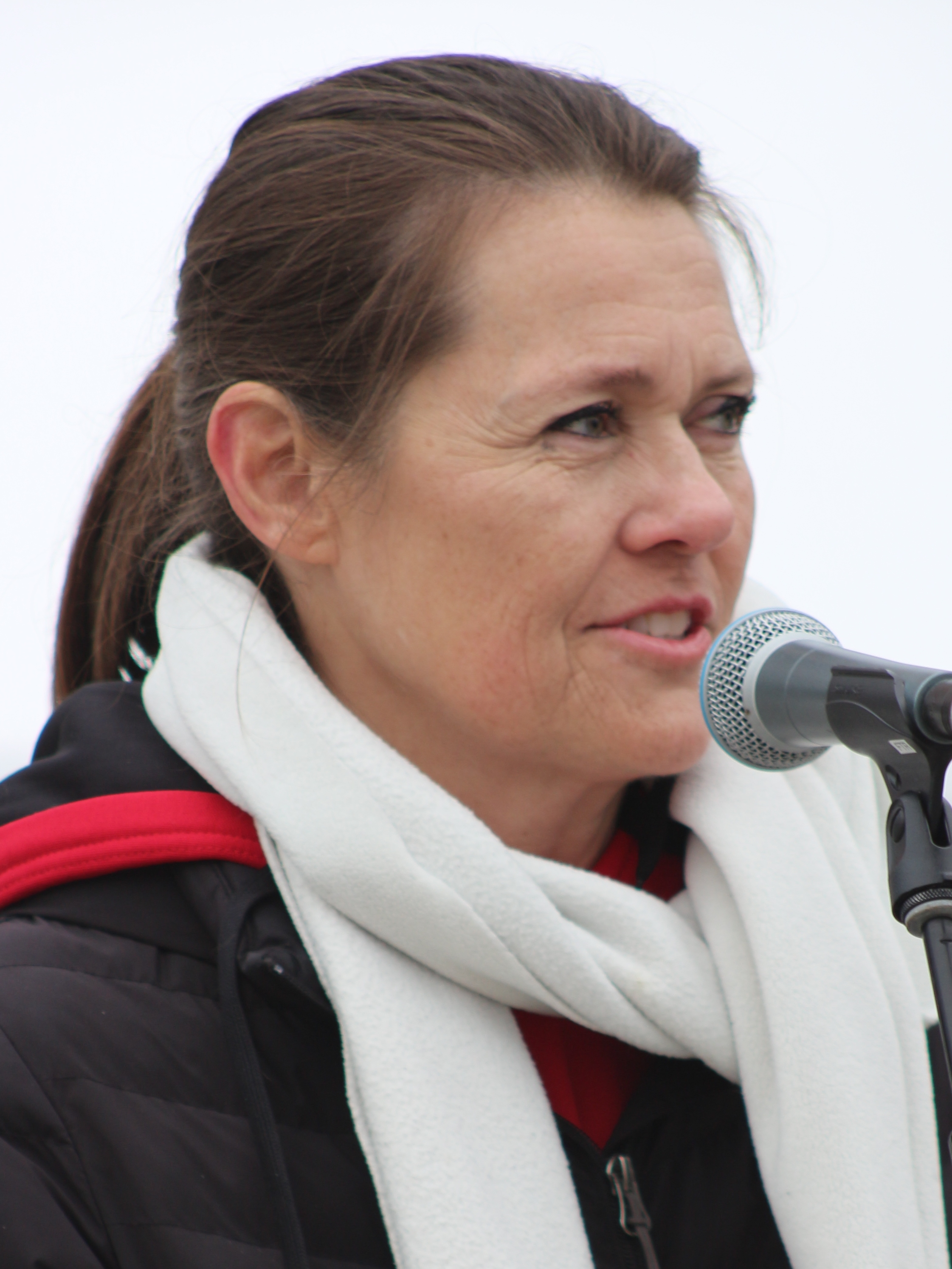

Nominee	Kathleen Kauth	Tim Royers
Party	Republican	Democratic
Popular vote	8,076	7,306
Percentage	52.50%	47.50%
Senator before election
Kathleen Kauth
Republican
Elected Senator
Kathleen Kauth
Republican

The incumbent was Republican Kathleen Kauth, who ran for being elected, after who was appointed.

Following the death of Senator Rich Pahls, a special election was held to determine who would fill the seat for the remaining two years of the term.

Declared

- Kathleen Kauth, businesswoman (incumbent)
- Tim Royers, educator

Predictions

Source	Ranking	As of
CNalysis	Lean R	October 3, 2023

==== Results ====
Nebraska's 31st Legislative District special election, 2022
Party	Candidate	Votes	%
Republican	Kathleen Kauth (incumbent)	8,076	52.50
Democratic	Tim Royers	7,306	47.50
Total votes		15,382	100.00
Republican hold			

=== District 32 ===
2022 Nebraska's 32nd Legislature District election
- November 8, 2022
Nominee	Tom Brandt
Party	Republican
Popular vote	11,253
Percentage	100.00%
Senator before election
Tom Brandt
Republican
Elected Senator
Tom Brandt
Republican

The incumbent was Republican Tom Brandt, who ran for re-election.

Declared

- Tom Brandt, farmer (incumbent)

Predictions

Source	Ranking	As of
CNalysis	Solid R	October 3, 2023

==== Results ====
Nebraska's 32nd Legislative District election, 2022
Primary election
Party	Candidate	Votes	%
Republican	Tom Brandt (incumbent)	8,077	100.00
Total votes		8,077	100.00
General election
Republican	Tom Brandt (incumbent)	11,253	100.00
Total votes		11,253	100.00
Republican hold			

=== District 34 ===
2022 Nebraska's 34th Legislature District election
- November 8, 2022

Nominee	Loren Lippincott	Michael Reimers
Party	Republican	Republican
Popular vote	8,788	4,199
Percentage	67.67%	32.33%
Senator before election
Curt Friesen
Republican
Elected Senator
Loren Lippincott
Republican

The incumbent was Republican Curt Friesen, who did not run for re-election.

==== Declared ====
- Loren Lippincott, US Air Force veteran, commercial pilot, and farmer
- Michael Reimers, National Guard veteran

==== Did not file ====
- Arron Kowalski, farmer

Predictions

Source	Ranking	As of
CNalysis	Solid R	October 3, 2023

==== Results ====
Nebraska's 34th Legislative District election, 2022
Primary election
Party	Candidate	Votes	%
Republican	Loren Lippincott	6,385	69.67
Republican	Michael Reimers	2,780	30.33
Total votes		9,165	100.00
General election
Republican	Loren Lippincott	8,788	67.67
Republican	Michael Reimers	4,199	32.33
Total votes		12,987	100.00
Republican hold			

=== District 36 ===
Declared

- Rick Holdcroft, candidate for District 3 in 2020
- Angie Lauritsen, small business owner

Did not file

- Jim Jenkins, rancher, entrepreneur and restaurant owner

Predictions

Source	Ranking	As of
CNalysis	Lean R	October 3, 2023

==== Results ====
Nebraska's 36th Legislative District election, 2022
Primary election
Party	Candidate	Votes	%
Republican	Rick Holdcroft	3,481	51.40
Democratic	Angie Lauritsen	3,291	48.60
Total votes		6,772	100.00
General election
Republican	Rick Holdcroft	8,188	55.96
Democratic	Angie Lauritsen	6,444	44.04
Total votes		14,632	100.00
Republican hold			

=== District 38 ===
2022 Nebraska's 38th Legislature District election
- November 8, 2022

Nominee	Dave Murman	Tyler R. Cappel
Party	Republican	Libertarian
Alliance		Democratic
Popular vote	9,368	5,031
Percentage	65.06%	34.94%
Senator before election
Dave Murman
Republican
Elected Senator
Dave Murman
Republican

The incumbent was Republican Dave Murman, who ran for re-election.

Declared

- Tyler R. Cappel, business owner and personal trainer
- Dave Murman, farmer (incumbent)

Predictions

Source	Ranking	As of
CNalysis	Solid R	October 3, 2023

==== Results ====
Nebraska's 38th Legislative District election, 2022
Primary election
Party	Candidate	Votes	%
Republican	Dave Murman (incumbent)	6,822	66.7
Libertarian	Tyler R. Cappel	3,406	33.3
Total votes		10,228	100.00
General election
Republican	Dave Murman (incumbent)	9,368	65.06
Libertarian	Tyler R. Cappel	5,031	34.94
Total votes		14,399	100.00
Republican hold			

=== District 40 ===
2022 Nebraska's 40th Legislature District election
- November 8, 2022

Nominee	Barry DeKay	Keith F.Kube
Party	Republican	Republican
Popular vote	9,486	6,494
Percentage	59.36%	40.64%
- Precinct results Broxson: 50–60% 60–70% Nichols: 50–60%
Senator before election
Tim Gragert
Republican
Elected Senator
Barry DeKay
Republican

The incumbent was Republican Tim Gragert, who did not run for re-election.

Declared

- Barry DeKay, former chair of the Nebraska Public Power District
- Robert E. Johnston, director of the Nebraska Soybean Association
- Keith F. Kube, candidate for this seat in 2014 and 2018
- Mark Patefield, former mayor of Laurel

Declined

- Tim Gragert, farmer (incumbent)

Predictions

Source	Ranking	As of
CNalysis	Solid R	October 3, 2023

==== Results ====
Nebraska's 40th Legislative District election, 2022
Primary election
Party	Candidate	Votes	%
Republican	Barry DeKay	4,443	36.10
Republican	Keith F. Kube	3,180	25.84
Republican	Mark Patefield	3,064	24.89
Republican	Robert E. Johnston	1,621	13.17
Total votes		12,308	100.00
General election
Republican	Barry DeKay	9,486	59.36
Republican	Keith F. Kube	6,494	40.64
Total votes		15,980	100.00
Republican hold			

=== District 42 ===
2022 Nebraska's 42nd Legislature District election
- November 8, 2022

Nominee	Mike Jacobson	Chris Bruns
Party	Republican	Republican
Popular vote	6,868	6,497
Percentage	51.39%	48.61%
- Precinct results Broxson: 50–60% Bruns: 50–60%
Senator before election
Mike Jacobson
Republican
Elected Senator
Mike Jacobson
Republican

The incumbent was Republican Mike Jacobson, who ran for re-election.

Declared

- Chris Bruns, Lincoln County Commissioner and US Marine Corps veteran
- Brenda Fourtner, independent provider
- Mike Jacobson (incumbent)

Withdrawn/disqualified

- Mel McNea, retired healthcare executive

Predictions

Source	Ranking	As of
CNalysis	Solid R	October 3, 2023

==== Results ====
Nebraska's 42nd Legislative District election, 2022
Primary election
Party	Candidate	Votes	%
Republican	Chris Bruns	4,043	45.39
Republican	Mike Jacobson (incumbent)	3,906	43.85
Republican	Brenda Fourtner	959	10.77
Total votes		8,908	100.00
General election
Republican	Mike Jacobson (incumbent)	6,868	51.39
Republican	Chris Bruns	6,497	48.61
Total votes		13,365	100.00
Republican hold			

=== District 44 ===
Declared

- Ed Dunn, chairman of the West Central Nebraska Development District
- Teresa Ibach, wife of former Under Secretary of Agriculture for Marketing and Regulatory Programs Greg Ibach

Predictions

Source	Ranking	As of
CNalysis	Solid R	October 3, 2023

==== Results ====
Nebraska's 44th Legislative District election, 2022
Primary election
Party	Candidate	Votes	%
Republican	Teresa Ibach	6,554	76.13
Republican	Ed Dunn	2,055	23.87
Total votes		8,609	100.00
General election
Republican	Teresa Ibach	9,708	100
Republican	Ed Dunn (withdrew)	0	0
Total votes		9,708	100.00
Republican hold			

=== District 46 ===
2022 Nebraska's 46th Special Legislature District election
- November 8, 2022

Nominee	Danielle Conrad	James Michael Bowers
Party	Democratic	Democratic
Popular vote	3,146	2,965
Percentage	51.48%	48.52%
Senator before election
Adam Morfeld
Democratic
Elected Senator
Danielle Conrad
Democratic

The incumbent was Democratic Adam Morfeld, who did not run for re-election.

==== Declared ====
- James Michael Bowers, Lincoln city councilman
- Danielle Conrad, former Nebraska State Senator
- James Herrold

==== Endorsements ====
James Michael Bowers

Elected officials

- Eliot Bostar, Nebraska State Senator
- Kathy Danek, member of Lincoln Public Schools board (co-endorsement with Conrad)
- Jen Day, Nebraska State Senator
- Leirion Gaylor Baird, Mayor of Lincoln
- Adam Morfeld, Nebraska State Senator
- Patty Pansing Brooks, Nebraska State Senator and candidate for Nebraska's 1st congressional district in the 2022 United States House of Representatives elections in Nebraska (co-endorsement with Conrad)
- Tammy Ward, Lincoln City Councilwoman

Labor unions

- Lincoln Education Association
- Lincoln Firefighters Association IAFF Local 644
- Nebraska State AFL–CIO
- Nebraska State Education Association

Organizations

- LGBTQ Victory Fund
- Planned Parenthood Advocates of Nebraska (co-endorsement with Conrad)

News media

- Lincoln Journal Star (primary co-endorsement with Conrad)
Danielle Conrad

Elected officials

- Kathy Danek, member of Lincoln Public Schools board (co-endorsement with Bowers)
- Megan Hunt, Nebraska State Senator
- Steve Lathrop, Nebraska State Senator
- John S. McCollister, Nebraska State Senator
- Patty Pansing Brooks, Nebraska State Senator and candidate for Nebraska's 1st congressional district in the 2022 United States House of Representatives elections in Nebraska (co-endorsement with Bowers)

Individuals

- Brad Ashford, former U.S. Representative (Nebraska's 2nd congressional district) and former Nebraska State Senator
- Bob Kerrey, former governor of Nebraska and U.S. senator
- Amanda McGill, former Nebraska state senator
- Marian Price, former Nebraska state senator
- DiAnna Schimek, former Nebraska state senator

Organizations

- Planned Parenthood Advocates of Nebraska (co-endorsed with Bowers)
- Sierra Club Chapter of Nebraska

News media

- Lincoln Journal Star (primary co-endorsement with Bowers)

Predictions

Source	Ranking	As of
CNalysis	Solid D	October 3, 2023

==== Results ====
Nebraska's 46th Legislative District election, 2022
Primary election
Party	Candidate	Votes	%
Democratic	Danielle Conrad	1,594	43.20
Democratic	James Michael Bowers	1,431	38.78
Libertarian	James Herrold	665	18.02
Total votes		3,690	100.00
General election
Democratic	Danielle Conrad	3,146	51.48
Democratic	James Michael Bowers	2,965	48.52
Total votes		6,111	100.00
Democratic hold			

=== District 48 ===
2022 Nebraska's 48th Legislature District election
- November 8, 2022
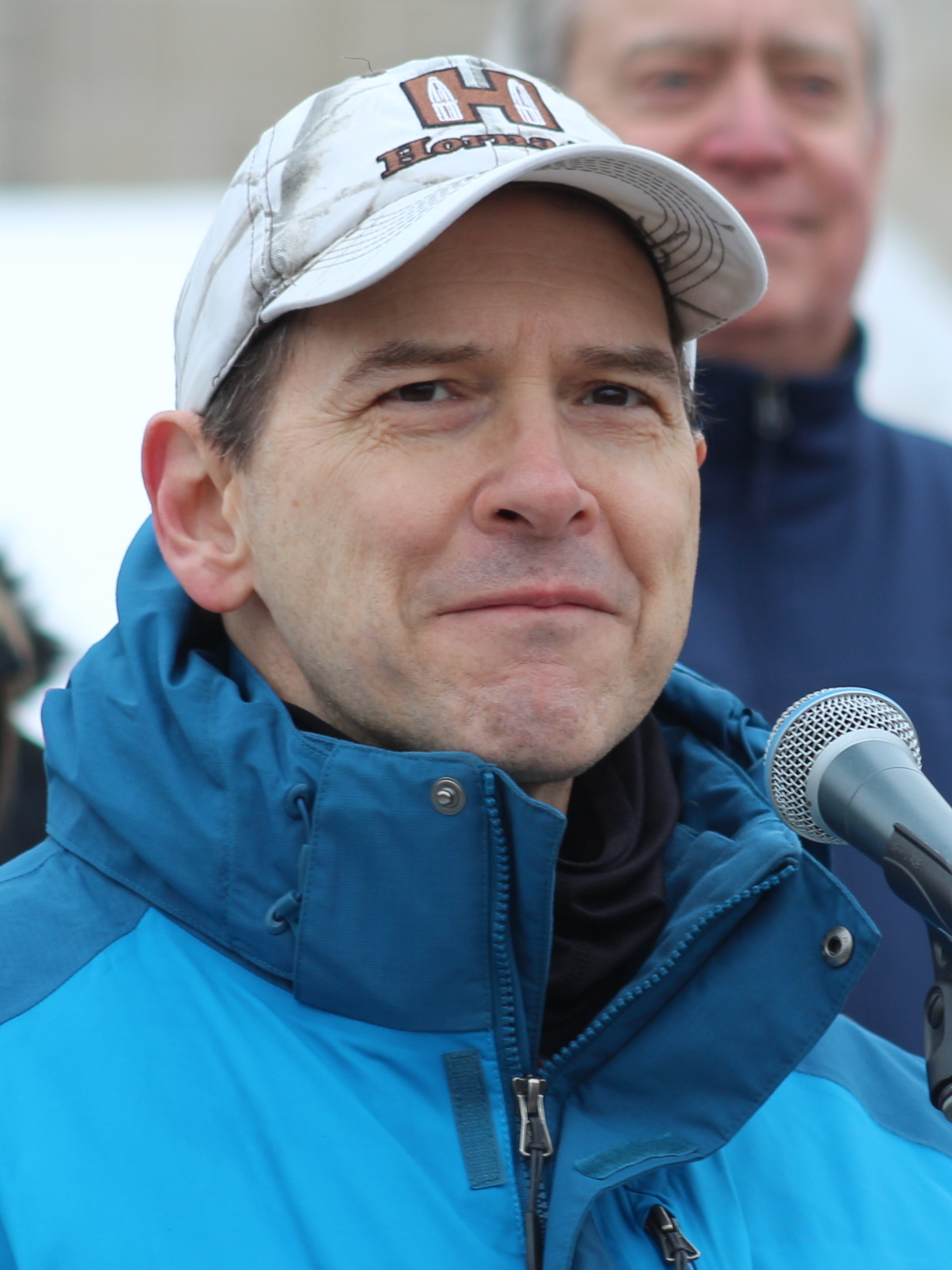

Nominee	Brian Hardin	Don L. Lease II
Party	Republican	Republican
Popular vote	5,526	5,071
Percentage	52.15%	47.85%
Senator before election
John Stinner
Republican
Elected Senator
Brian Hardin
Republican

The incumbent was Republican John Stinner, who did not run for re-election.

==== Declared ====
- Talon Cordle
- Brian Hardin, businessman
- Don L. Lease II, farmer
- Scott Shaver
- Jeremiah Jake Teeple

Predictions

Source	Ranking	As of
CNalysis	Solid R	October 3, 2023

==== Results ====
Nebraska's 48th Legislative District election, 2022
Primary election
Party	Candidate	Votes	%
Republican	Brian Hardin	2,647	45.17
Republican	Don L. Lease II	1,370	23.38
Republican	Scott Shaver	1,318	22.49
Republican	Jeremiah Jake Teeple	292	4.98
Republican	Talon Cordle	233	3.98
Total votes		5,860	100.00
General election
Republican	Brian Hardin	5,526	52.15
Republican	Don L. Lease II	5,071	47.85
Total votes		10,597	100.00
Republican hold			
