= 2018 Nebraska Legislature election =

- November 6, 2018; Officially nonpartisan

24 of the 49 seats in the Nebraska Legislature 25 seats needed for a majority
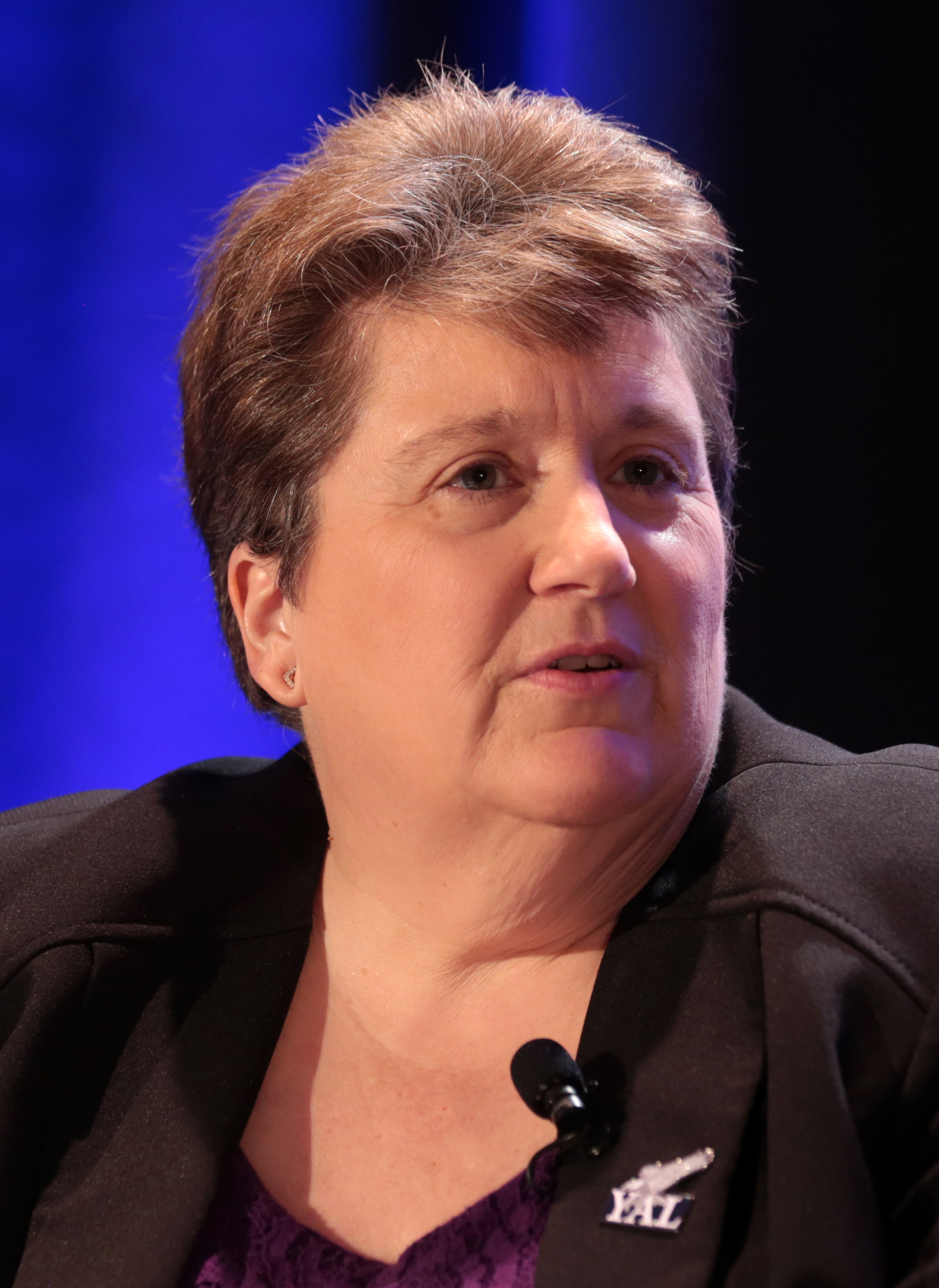
	Majority party	Minority party	Third party
	Rep	Dem
Leader	Jim Scheer	None	Ernie Chambers (de facto)
Party	Republican	Democratic	Independent
Last election	32	15	1
Seats before	31	16	1
Seats won	30	18	1
Seat change	▼1	▲2	Steady
	Fourth party
Leader	Laura Ebke (de facto)
Party	Libertarian
Last election	0
Seats before	1
Seats won	0
Seat change	▼1
- Democratic gain Republican gain Democratic hold Republican hold 50–60% 60–70% 70–80% >90% 50–60% 60–70% 70–80% >90%
Speaker before election
Jim Scheer
Republican
Elected Speaker
Jim Scheer
Republican

The 2018 Nebraska State Legislature elections took place as part of the biennial United States elections. Nebraska voters elected state senators (Note: Although Nebraska's legislature is unicameral, the officeholders are called senators.) in the 24 even-numbered seats of the 49 (Note: The odd-numbered districts were elected in 2016 and would be up for election again in 2020.) legislative districts in the Nebraska Unicameral. Nebraska is unique among American states in that there is only one chamber in its state legislature, and this chamber is called the Unicameral and the State Legislature interchangeably. State senators serve four-year terms in the Nebraska Unicameral.

A top two primary election on May 15, 2018, determined which candidates would appear on the November 6 general election ballot. Each candidate technically runs as a non-partisan (i.e., no party preference).

Following the 2016 elections, Republicans maintained effective control of the Nebraska State Legislature with 32 seats. Democrats increased their numbers from 15 to 16 seats when State Senator Bob Krist of the 10th legislative district switched parties from Republican to Democrat. Furthermore, Republican state senator Jim Smith resigned from office, leaving an open seat for Republicans to defend in the 14th legislative district.

On election day 2018, the Unicameral consisted of 31 Republican seats, (Note: Including Sen. Smith's vacated seat in the 14th legislative district.) 16 Democratic seats, and one seat each for Independent Sen. Ernie Chambers and Libertarian Sen. Laura Ebke. The Democrats gained a net two seats, while the Republicans lost net one and the chamber's lone Libertarian was defeated.

== Summary of results by district ==
- Note: All Nebraska state legislative elections are technically non-partisan; therefore, parties listed here are from candidates' websites and official party endorsement lists. Candidates all appear on the ballot without party labels.
- Districts not shown were not up for election until 2020.

State Legislative district	Incumbent	Party	Elected Senator	Party
2nd	Robert Clements	Rep	Robert Clements	Rep
4th	Robert Hilkemann	Rep	Robert Hilkemann	Rep
6th	Theresa Thibodeau	Rep	Machaela Cavanaugh	Dem
8th	Burke Harr	Dem	Megan Hunt	Dem
10th	Bob Krist	Dem	Wendy DeBoer	Dem
12th	Merv Riepe	Rep	Steve Lathrop	Dem
14th	Vacant	Rep	John Arch	Rep
16th	Lydia Brasch	Rep	Ben Hansen	Rep
18th	Brett Lindstrom	Rep	Brett Lindstrom	Rep
20th	John S. McCollister	Rep	John S. McCollister	Rep
22nd	Paul Schumacher	Rep	Mike Moser	Rep
24th	Mark Kolterman	Rep	Mark Kolterman	Rep
26th	Matt Hansen	Dem	Matt Hansen	Dem
28th	Patty Pansing Brooks	Dem	Patty Pansing Brooks	Dem
30th	Roy Baker	Rep	Myron Dorn	Rep
32nd	Laura Ebke	Lib	Tom Brandt	Rep
34th	Curt Friesen	Rep	Curt Friesen	Rep
36th	Matt Williams	Rep	Matt Williams	Rep
38th	John Kuehn	Rep	Dave Murman	Rep
40th	Tyson Larson	Rep	Tim Gragert	Rep
42nd	Mike Groene	Rep	Mike Groene	Rep
44th	Dan Hughes	Rep	Dan Hughes	Rep
46th	Adam Morfeld	Dem	Adam Morfeld	Dem
48th	John Stinner	Rep	John Stinner	Rep

== Close races ==
District	Winner	Party	Margin
6	Machaela Cavanaugh	Democratic (flip)	1.9%
10	Wendy DeBoer	Democratic	0.64%
18	Brett Lindstrom	Republican	7.2%
30	Myron Dorn	Republican	5.96%

== Predictions ==
Source	Ranking	As of
Governing	Safe R	October 8, 2018

== Detailed results ==
=== District 2 ===
Nebraska's 2nd Legislative District election, 2018
Primary election
Candidate	Votes	%
Robert Clements (incumbent)	2,867	47.81
Susan D. Lorence	2,252	37.55
James Bond	878	14.64
Total votes	5,997	100.0
General election
Robert Clements (incumbent)	7,965	56.96
Susan D. Lorence	6,019	43.04
Total votes	13,984	100.0

=== District 4 ===
Nebraska's 4th Legislative District election, 2018
Primary election
Candidate	Votes	%
Bob Hilkemann (incumbent)	2,842	56.70
Shannon Coryell	2,170	43.30
Total votes	5,012	100.0
General election
Bob Hilkemann (incumbent)	8,964	60.95
Shannon Coryell	5,743	39.05
Total votes	14,707	100.0

=== District 6 ===
Nebraska's 6th Legislative District election, 2018
Primary election
Candidate	Votes	%
Theresa Thibodeau (incumbent)	3,641	51.30
Machaela Cavanaugh	3,027	42.65
Ricky Fulton	429	6.04
Total votes	7,097	100.0
General election
Machaela Cavanaugh	7,733	50.95
Theresa Thibodeau (incumbent)	7,445	49.05
Total votes	15,178	100.0

=== District 8 ===
Burke Harr (incumbent) was term-limited.

Nebraska's 8th Legislative District election, 2018
Primary election
Candidate	Votes	%
Megan Hunt	3,284	56.38
Mina Davis	1,299	22.30
Josh Henningsen	1,242	21.32
Total votes	5,825	100.0
General election
Megan Hunt	7,634	64.11
Mina Davis	4,274	35.89
Total votes	11,908	100.0

=== District 10 ===
Bob Krist (incumbent) was term-limited.

Nebraska's 10th Legislative District election, 2018
Primary election
Candidate	Votes	%
Wendy DeBoer	3,253	57.31
Matt Deaver	2,423	42.69
Total votes	5,676	100.0
General election
Wendy DeBoer	8,306	50.32
Matt Deaver	8,201	49.68
Total votes	16,507	100.0

=== District 12 ===
Nebraska's 12th Legislative District election, 2018
Primary election
Candidate	Votes	%
Steve Lathrop	2,658	53.47
Merv Riepe (incumbent)	2,313	46.53
Total votes	4,971	100.0
General election
Steve Lathrop	7,030	55.84
Merv Riepe (incumbent)	5,559	44.16
Total votes	12,589	100.0

=== District 14 ===
Jim Smith (incumbent) was term-limited.

Nebraska's 14th Legislative District election, 2018
Primary election
Candidate	Votes	%
John Arch	3,462	60.02
Jeff Parris	2,306	39.98
Total votes	5,768	100.0
General election
John Arch	7,625	55.82
Jeff Parris	6,035	44.18
Total votes	13,660	100.0

=== District 16 ===
Lydia Brasch (incumbent) was term-limited.

Nebraska's 16th Legislative District election, 2018
Primary election
Candidate	Votes	%
Ben Hansen	4,620	58.77
Chuck Hassebrook	3,241	41.23
Total votes	7,861	100.0
General election
Ben Hansen	9,109	61.59
Chuck Hassebrook	5,680	38.41
Total votes	14,789	100.0

=== District 18 ===
Nebraska's 18th Legislative District election, 2018
Primary election
Candidate	Votes	%
Brett Lindstrom (incumbent)	2,922	56.15
Scott Winkler	1,937	37.22
Austin Hennrich	345	6.63
Total votes	5,204	100.0
General election
Brett Lindstrom (incumbent)	6,874	53.60
Scott Winkler	5,950	46.40
Total votes	12,824	100.0

=== District 20 ===
Nebraska's 20th Legislative District election, 2018
Primary election
Candidate	Votes	%
John S. McCollister (incumbent)	4,213	63.23
Jackie Collett	1,968	29.54
Chris Anne Dienstbier	482	7.23
Total votes	6,663	100.0
General election
John S. McCollister (incumbent)	8,689	58.80
Jackie Collett	6,089	41.20
Total votes	14,778	100.0

=== District 22 ===
Paul Schumacher (incumbent) was term-limited.

Nebraska's 22nd Legislative District election, 2018
Primary election
Candidate	Votes	%
Mike Moser	3,578	56.12
Doug Oertwich	1,366	21.42
Francis P. Kuehler	1,102	17.28
Kenneth G. Leischner	330	5.18
Total votes	6,376	100.0
General election
Mike Moser	7,896	64.30
Doug Oertwich	4,383	35.70
Total votes	12,279	100.0

=== District 24 ===
Nebraska's 24th Legislative District election, 2018
Primary election
Candidate	Votes	%
Mark A. Kolterman (incumbent)	3,795	72.07
Stephanie Nantkes	1,471	27.93
Total votes	5,266	100.0
General election
Mark A. Kolterman (incumbent)	9,501	73.46
Stephanie Nantkes	3,433	26.54
Total votes	12,934	100.0

=== District 26 ===
Nebraska's 26th Legislative District election, 2018
Primary election
Candidate	Votes	%
Matt Hansen (incumbent)	4,223	76.96
Bob Van Valkenburg	1,264	23.04
Total votes	5,487	100.0
General election
Matt Hansen (incumbent)	9,046	73.16
Bob Van Valkenburg	3,319	26.84
Total votes	12,365	100.0

=== District 28 ===
Nebraska's 28th Legislative District election, 2018
Primary election
Candidate	Votes	%
Patty Pansing Brooks (incumbent)	6,263	100.0
Total votes	6,263	100.0
General election
Patty Pansing Brooks (incumbent)	11,717	100.0
Total votes	11,717	100.0

=== District 30 ===
Roy Baker (incumbent) retired.

Nebraska's 30th Legislative District election, 2018
Primary election
Candidate	Votes	%
Myron Dorn	3,161	40.50
Don Schuller	2,977	38.15
Joe Murray	1,666	21.35
Total votes	7,804	100.0
General election
Myron Dorn	7,923	52.98
Don Schuller	7,032	47.02
Total votes	14,955	100.0

=== District 32 ===
Nebraska's 32nd Legislative District election, 2018
Primary election
Candidate	Votes	%
Tom Brandt	3,514	44.45
Laura Ebke (incumbent)	2,612	33.04
Al Riskowski	1,780	22.51
Total votes	7,906	100.0
General election
Tom Brandt	8,154	56.42
Laura Ebke (incumbent)	6,299	43.58
Total votes	14,453	100.0

=== District 34 ===
Nebraska's 34th Legislative District election, 2018
Primary election
Candidate	Votes	%
Curt Friesen (incumbent)	5,784	100.0
Total votes	5,784	100.0
General election
Curt Friesen (incumbent)	10,796	100.0
Total votes	10,796	100.0

=== District 36 ===
Nebraska's 36th Legislative District election, 2018
Primary election
Candidate	Votes	%
Matt Williams (incumbent)	4,520	100.0
Total votes	4,520	100.0
General election
Matt Williams (incumbent)	9,816	100.0
Total votes	9,816	100.0

=== District 38 ===
John Kuehn (incumbent) retired.

Nebraska's 38th Legislative District election, 2018
Primary election
Candidate	Votes	%
Dave Murman	3,206	45.76
Marsha Fangmeyer	1,633	23.31
Thomas Osborn	1,059	15.12
Ronald L. Johnson	416	5.94
Michael D. Combs	391	5.58
Andrew Murphy	301	4.30
Total votes	7,006	100.0
General election
Dave Murman	9,114	64.27
Marsha Fangmeyer	5,067	35.73
Total votes	14,181	100.0

=== District 40 ===
Tyson Larson (incumbent) was term-limited.

Nebraska's 40th Legislative District election, 2018
Primary election
Candidate	Votes	%
Timothy J. Gragert	1,666	20.38
Keith F. Kube	1,590	19.45
Shane Greckel	1,487	18.19
Thomas E. Ferry	1,331	16.28
Michael A. Sobotka	1,151	14.08
Julie Thomsen	951	11.63
Total votes	8,176	100.0
General election
Timothy J. Gragert	7,222	51.63
Keith F. Kube	6,767	48.37
Total votes	13,989	100.0

=== District 42 ===
Nebraska's 42nd Legislative District election, 2018
Primary election
Candidate	Votes	%
Mike Groene (incumbent)	4,242	100.0
Total votes	4,242	100.0
General election
Mike Groene (incumbent)	8,180	67.13
Judy Pederson	4,005	32.87
Total votes	12,185	100.0

=== District 44 ===
Nebraska's 44th Legislative District election, 2018
Primary election
Candidate	Votes	%
Dan Hughes (incumbent)	5,251	76.23
Stephanie L. Malcolm	1,637	23.77
Total votes	6,888	100.0
General election
Dan Hughes (incumbent)	9,872	77.31
Stephanie L. Malcolm	2,898	22.69
Total votes	12,770	100.0

=== District 46 ===
Nebraska's 46th Legislative District election, 2018
Primary election
Candidate	Votes	%
Adam Morfeld (incumbent)	2,360	100.0
Total votes	2,360	100.0
General election
Adam Morfeld (incumbent)	5,776	100.0
Total votes	5,776	100.0

=== District 48 ===
Nebraska's 48th Legislative District election, 2018
Primary election
Candidate	Votes	%
John P. Stinner (incumbent)	3,773	100.0
Total votes	3,773	100.0
General election
John P. Stinner (incumbent)	9,041	100.0
Total votes	9,041	100.0

== See also ==
- United States elections, 2018
- United States House of Representatives elections in Nebraska, 2018
- United States Senate election in Nebraska, 2018
- Nebraska gubernatorial election, 2018
- Nebraska Attorney General election, 2018
- Nebraska Secretary of State election, 2018
- Nebraska elections, 2018
