= 2026 Nebraska gubernatorial election =

- November 3, 2026
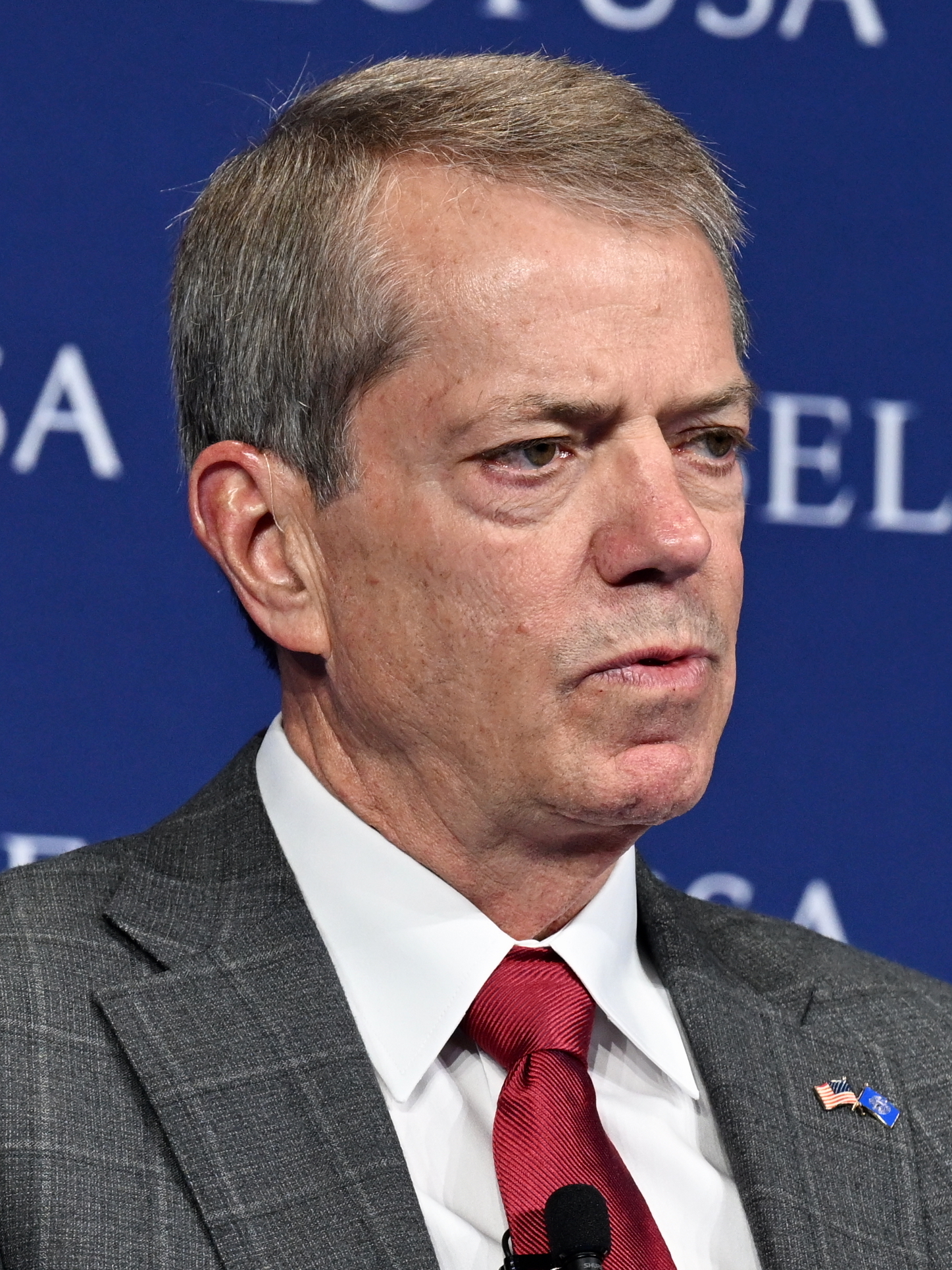

Nominee	Jim Pillen	Lynne Walz
Party	Republican	Democratic
Running mate	Joe Kelly	Ben Steffen
Popular vote	384,579	326,179
Percentage	50.28%	42.64%
- Pillen: 40–50% 50–60% 60–70% 70–80% 80–90% Walz: 40–50% 50–60%
Governor before election
Jim Pillen
Republican
Elected Governor
Jim Pillen
Republican

The 2026 Nebraska gubernatorial election was held on November 3, 2026, to elect the governor of Nebraska. Incumbent Republican governor Jim Pillen won re-election to a second term.

Primary elections took place on May 12, 2026. Pillen secured his party's nomination with 76% of the vote, while Democratic former state senator Lynne Walz secured her party's nomination with 91% of the vote.

This was the best performance for a Democrat in a Nebraska gubernatorial election since 1994, which was also the most recent time that Democrats won a gubernatorial election in Nebraska. This was also the closest gubernatorial election in Nebraska since 1990.

== Republican primary ==
=== Candidates ===
==== Nominee ====
- Jim Pillen, incumbent governor (2023–present)
  - Running mate: Joe Kelly, incumbent lieutenant governor (2023–present)

==== Eliminated in primary ====
- Sal Holguin, car wash owner and Air Force veteran
- Sheila Korth-Focken, former Randolph city administrator
- Gary Rogge, retired farmer
- Jacy Todd, CBD retail store owner
- John Walz, candidate for Nebraska's 3rd congressional district in 2024

==== Declined ====
- Don Bacon, U.S. representative from Nebraska's 2nd congressional district (2017–present)
- Charles Herbster, agribusiness executive and candidate for governor in 2014 and 2022
- Brett Lindstrom, former state senator from the 18th district (2015–2023), candidate for Nebraska's 2nd congressional district in 2012, and candidate for governor in 2022 (ran as an Independent, then as America First candidate)

=== Endorsements ===
Jim Pillen

Executive branch officials

- Donald Trump, president of the United States (2017–2021, 2025–present)

Statewide officials

- Dave Heineman, former governor of Nebraska (2005–2015)

Organizations

- State Troopers Association of Nebraska

=== Results ===
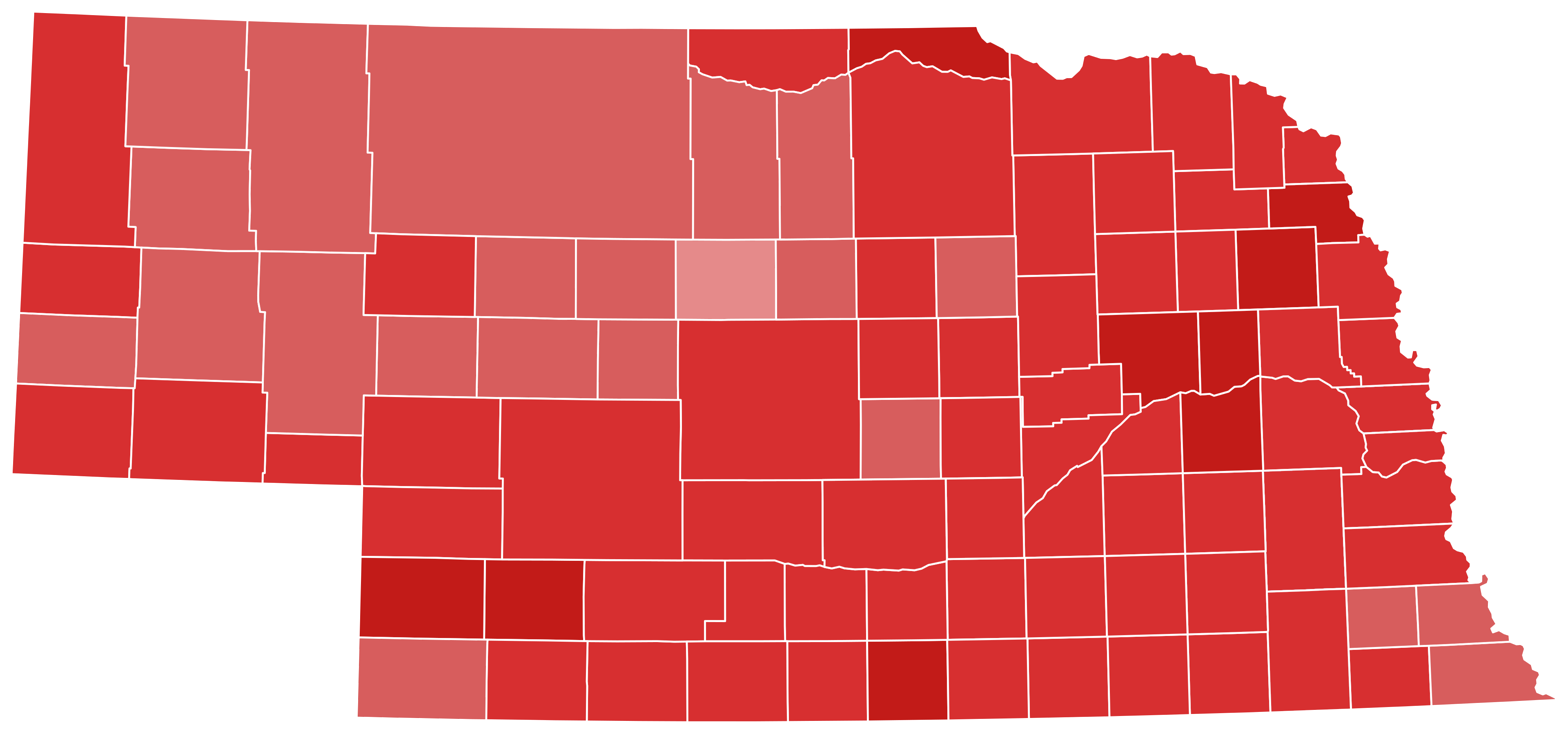
Results by county: Pillen: 60–70%; 70–80%; 80–90%; 90-100%

Republican primary
Party	Candidate	Votes	%
Republican	Jim Pillen (incumbent)	142,301	75.4
Republican	John Walz	18,066	9.6
Republican	Sheila Korth-Focken	14,621	7.8
Republican	Gary Rogge	6,986	3.7
Republican	Jacy Todd	5,125	2.7
Republican	Sal Holguin	1,612	0.9
Total votes		188,711	100.0

== Democratic primary ==
=== Candidates ===
==== Nominee ====
- Lynne Walz, former state senator from the 15th district (2017–2025) and nominee for lieutenant governor in 2018
  - Running mate: Ben Steffen, farmer

==== Eliminated in primary ====
- Larry Marvin, USAF veteran

=== Endorsements ===
Lynne Walz

U.S. senators

- Ben Nelson, former U.S. senator (2001–2013) and former governor of Nebraska (1991–1999)

=== Results ===
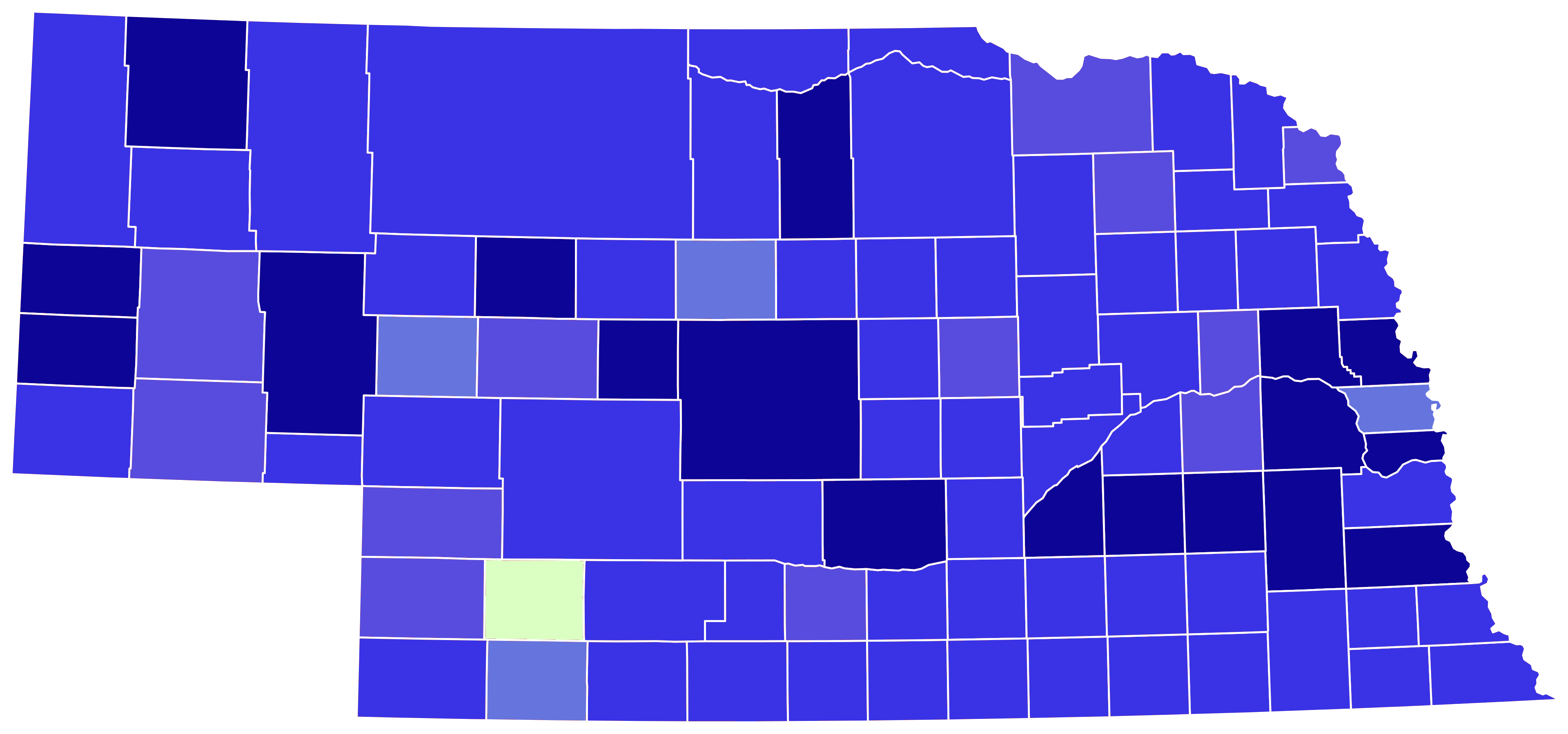
Results by county: Walz: 50–60%; 60–70%; 70–80%; 80–90%; 90-100%; Marvin: 60%

Democratic primary
Party	Candidate	Votes	%
Democratic	Lynne Walz	116,458	91.5
Democratic	Larry Marvin	10,847	8.5
Total votes		127,305	100.0

== Legal Marijuana NOW primary ==
=== Candidates ===
==== Nominee ====
- Rick Beard, private chef, winemaker, and former farmer
  - Running mate: Keenya Barnes, Omaha Housing Authority commissioner

==== Eliminated in primary ====
- James Charvat

=== Results ===
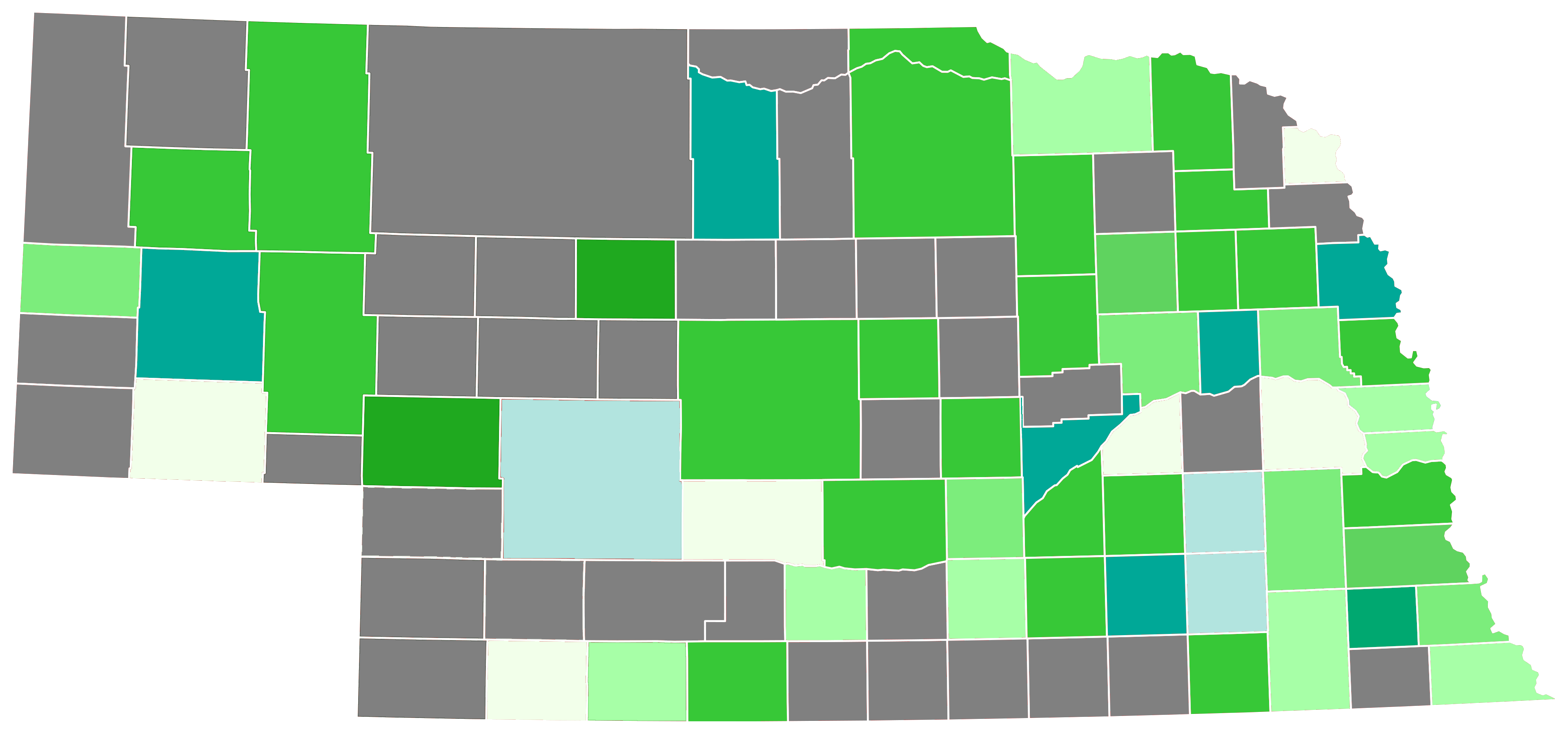
Results by county: Beard: 60–70%; 70–80%; 80–90%; 90-100%; Charvat: 60-70%; 90-100%; Tie No Votes

Legal Marijuana Now primary
Party	Candidate	Votes	%
Legal Marijuana NOW	Rick Beard	349	69.1
Legal Marijuana NOW	James Charvat	156	30.9
Total votes		505	100.0

== Third party and independent candidates ==
=== American First Party ===
==== Nominee ====
- Brett Lindstrom, former state senator from the 18th district (2015–2023), Republican candidate for Nebraska's 2nd congressional district in 2012 and 2026, and Republican candidate for governor in 2022
  - Running mate: Mike Picard, U.S. Navy veteran

== General election ==
=== Predictions ===
Source	Ranking	As of
The Cook Political Report	Lean R	October 29, 2026
Decision Desk HQ	Likely R	November 3, 2026
Fox News	Likely R	November 1, 2026
Inside Elections	Likely R	October 29, 2026
NBC News	Lean R	November 3, 2026
RealClearPolitics	Solid R	November 1, 2026
Sabato's Crystal Ball	Likely R	November 2, 2026
Silver Bulletin	Likely R	November 3, 2026

=== Post-primary endorsements ===
Lynne Walz (D)

Statewide officials

- Laura Kelly, governor of Kansas (2019–present)

State legislators

- Mark Kolterman, state legislator from the 24th district (2017–2023) (Republican)
- Tim Gragert, state legislator from the 40th district (2019–2023) (Republican)
- John Stinner, state legislator from the 48th district (2015–2023) (Republican)
- John S. McCollister, state legislator from the 20th district (2015–2023) (Republican)
Jim Pillen (R)

State legislators

- Lou Ann Linehan, state legislator from the 39th district (2017–2025)

Organizations

- Nebraska Farm Bureau

=== Polling ===
Aggregate polls

Source of poll aggregation	Dates administered	Dates updated	Jim Pillen (R)	Lynne Walz (D)	Other/ Undecided (Note: Calculated by taking the difference of 100% and all other candidates combined.)	Margin
270toWin	September 28 – October 29, 2026	November 1, 2026	47.4%	41.0%	11.6%	Pillen +6.4%
Decision Desk HQ	through October 29, 2026	November 1, 2026	47.7%	42.3%	10.0%	Pillen +5.4%
FiftyPlusOne	through October 29, 2026	November 1, 2026	48.2%	42.1%	9.7%	Pillen +6.1%
Silver Bulletin	through October 29, 2026	November 1, 2026	47.0%	41.4%	11.6%	Pillen +5.6%
Average			47.6%	41.7%	10.7%	Pillen +5.9%

Poll source	Date(s) administered	Sample size (Note: Key: A – all adults RV – registered voters LV – likely voters V – unclear)	Margin of error	Jim Pillen (R)	Lynne Walz (D)	Brett Lindstrom (AF)	Rick Beard (LMN)	Other	Undecided
YouGov	October 26–29, 2026	1,979 (LV)	± 2.8%	50%	47%	—	—	1%	0%
New York Times/Siena University	October 23–29, 2026	809 (LV)	± 4.0%	53%	40%	—	—	0%	7%
Echelon Insights (R) (Note: Poll conducted for NetChoice)	October 16–23, 2026	407 (LV)	± 6.3%	47%	40%	4%	7%	—	2%
Concord Public Opinion Partners (D) (Note: Poll sponsored by Education Reform Now Advocacy)	October 15–18, 2026	500 (LV)	± 4.4%	40%	43%	—	—	9%	8%
National Public Affairs (R)	October 15–18, 2026	598 (LV)	± 4.0%	47%	41%	5%	3%	—	4%
Global Strategy Group (D) (Note: Poll sponsored by Walz's campaign)	October 13–18, 2026	800 (LV)	± 3.5%	40%	39%	5%	5%	—	11%
Public Policy Polling (D)	October 13–14, 2026	571 (RV)	± 4.1%	48% (Note: Without third party candidates)	46%	—	—	—	6%
Public Policy Polling (D)	October 13–14, 2026	571 (RV)	± 4.1%	44%	43%	5%	3%	—	5%
National Public Affairs (R)	October 2–5, 2026	600 (LV)	± 4.0%	44%	40%	7%	5%	—	6%
YouGov	September 24 – October 3, 2026	1,809 (LV)	± 3.3%	44%	43%	—	—	2%	10%
co/efficient (R)	September 28–30, 2026	1,113 (LV)	± 2.92%	43%	38%	5%	3%	—	10%
Lake Research Partners (D)	September 8–14, 2026	(RV)	± 3.5%	40%	40%	9%	4%	—	7%
SurveyUSA (Note: Poll sponsored by Grant Forbes, LLC.)	September 8–13, 2026	503 (LV)	± 6.4%	43%	35%	—	—	13% (Note: "Another candidate" with 13%)	9%
Public Policy Polling (D) (Note: Poll sponsored by the Democratic Governors Association)	September 1–2, 2026	559 (RV)	± 4.1%	32%	31%	10%	7%	4% (Note: "Nebraska Working People's Party Candidate" with 4%)	17%
Lake Research Partners (D)	April 25–29, 2026	900 (LV)	± 3.3%	47%	45%	—	—	—	5%
Public Policy Polling (D)	April 6–7, 2026	670 (RV)	± 3.8%	38%	33%	—	12%	—	17%
Lake Research Partners (D)	December 11–17, 2025	900 (LV)	± 3.3%	48%	43%	—	—	—	9%
Lake Research Partners (D)	July 23–29, 2025	900 (LV)	± 3.3%	51%	39%	—	—	—	10%

=== Results ===
2026 Nebraska gubernatorial election
Party	Candidate	Votes	%	±%
Republican	Jim Pillen (incumbent) Joe Kelly (incumbent)	384,579	50.28	
Democratic	Lynne Walz Ben Steffen	326,179	42.64	
America First	Brett Lindstrom Mike Picard	33,658	4.40	
Legal Marijuana NOW	Rick Beard Keenya Barnes	20,471	2.68	
Total votes		764,887	100.0	
Republican hold				

==== By congressional district ====
District	Pillen	Walz	Representative
1st	45.84%	47.39%	Mike Flood
2nd	38.56%	54.67%	Denise Powell
3rd	67.08%	25.18%	Adrian Smith

== See also ==
- 2026 United States elections
- 2026 United States Senate election in Nebraska
- 2026 United States House of Representatives elections in Nebraska
- 2026 Nebraska elections

== Notes ==
Partisan clients
