= Ideus (surname) =

Ideus is a surname, and may refer to:

- Cally Ideus, American politician
- Rodrigo Ideus, Colombian rower
