= Tim Anderson (Nebraska politician) =

American politician

Member-elect of the Nebraska Legislature from the 38th district
- Assuming office January 6, 2027
- Succeeding: Dave Murman

Personal details
- Party: Republican
- Website: Campaign website

Tim Anderson is an American politician from the Nebraska Republican Party who is the senator-elect for the 38th district in the Nebraska Legislature. He was elected in the 2026 general election. Anderson is a farmer and the Mayor of Sutton, Nebraska.
