= America First Party (2026) =

Political party active in Nebraska

- Abbreviation: AF
- Chairperson: John Cartier
- Founder: John Cartier
- Founded: July 1, 2026; 4 months ago
- Membership (2026): ▲196
- Ideology: Conservatism (US) American nationalism
- Political position: Right-wing
- Colors: Navy; Red
- Seats in the U.S. Senate: 0 / 2
- Seats in the U.S. House: 0 / 3
- Statewide Executive Offices: 0 / 6
- Seats in the Nebraska Legislature (officially nonpartisan): 0 / 49

Website
- americafirstne.com

The America First Party is a right-wing political party active in the state of Nebraska. Founded in 2026, the party has 196 members.

== History ==
In July 2026, lawyer John Cartier submitted over 15,000 signatures to the secretary of state of Nebraska to file as an official party. Cartier, the attorney general for the Omaha Tribe, had previously served as treasurer for Mike Marvin, the Nebraska Legal Marijuana NOW Party's nominee for U.S. Senate in the 2026 election. Following challenges by the Nebraska Republican Party over alleged "political sabotage", the state Supreme Court cleared the America First Party to become an official party within the state. Following its establishment, John Cartier was named as the party's chair, along with Kimberly Bowling-Martin as vice chair, John Knight as secretary, and Devin Specht as treasurer.

The party nominated five candidates for office in Nebraska in the 2026 cycle, including former state legislators Bob Krist for secretary of state and Brett Lindstrom for governor. Krist had previously considered a nonpartisan run for secretary of state before initially backing out. Lindstrom had launched an independent campaign for governor prior to the party's establishment, though he was removed from the ballot after many signatures collected by the campaign to qualify were found to be fraudulent. Lindstrom switched his affiliation to America First in August and announced he would run under the party's nomination on September 1st. He named Navy veteran Mike Picard as his running mate.

== Political positions ==
The America First Party says it aims to "provide voters with a political organization committed to putting Americans and Nebraskans ahead of all others by cracking down on out-of-control government spending and wasteful foreign aid, getting tough on illegal immigrants, standing up against abortion, and rigidly defending the Second Amendment".

== Election results ==
=== Congressional elections ===
Year	Candidate	District	General election			Notes	Ref
Year	Candidate	District	Votes	%	Result	Notes	Ref
2026	Chuck Conboy	Senate	9,277	1.21%	Lost ✗		
2026	Daniel Hartong	NE 1	4,392	1.73%	Lost ✗		

=== State elections ===
Year	Candidate	Office	General election			Notes	Ref
Year	Candidate	Office	Votes	%	Result	Notes	Ref
2026	John Knight	State Auditor	174,992	25.70%	Lost ✗		
2026	Bob Krist	Secretary of State	19,670	2.61%	Lost ✗		
2026	Brett Lindstrom	Governor	33,764	4.40%	Lost ✗	Mike Picard is Lindstrom's running mate for lieutenant governor.	
