= Barry DeKay =

American politician

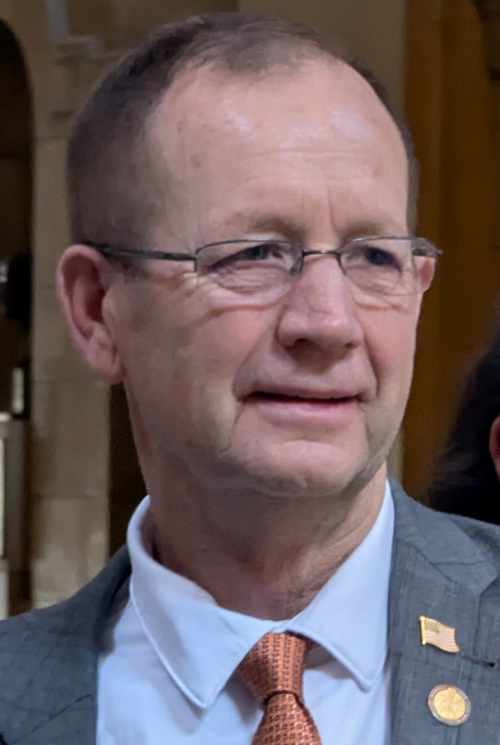

Member of the Nebraska Legislature from the 40th district
- Incumbent
- Assumed office January 4, 2023
- Preceded by: Tim Gragert

Personal details
- Born: May 29, 1959 (age 67)
- Party: Republican
- Occupation: Farmer and Rancher
- Website: Campaign

Barry DeKay is an American politician. A Republican, he has been representing District 40 in the Nebraska Legislature since November 8, 2022.

== Personal life ==
DeKay was born May 29, 1959 in the village Lynch, Nebraska in Boyd County. He graduated high school in 1977 and then attended Wayne State College in Wayne, Nebraska. He married in September 1989 and has two children. DeKay is a farmer/rancher in northeast Nebraska.

DeKay has served as a board member for several organizations such as Raymond Township Board, Niobrara Valley Electric Membership Corporation, Nebraska Rural Electric Association and Nebraska Public Power District. He is currently a member of the Niobrara Valley Hospital Foundation.

== Nebraska State Legislature ==
As of 2025, DeKay serves as the Chairperson on the Agriculture Committee, Vice Chair of the Natural Resources Committee, and a member of the General Affairs Committee. He also serves on the Vice Chair on State-Tribal Relations Select Special Committee and Statewide Tourism and Recreational Water Access and Resource Sustainability Special Committee.

District 40 of Nebraska's Legislative District includes Holt, Knox, Antelope, and Cedar Counties along with a majority of Dixon and Pierce Counties in northeast Nebraska.

In April 2024, DeKay paid a $250 civil fine to the Nebraska Accountability and Disclosure Commission, which enforces campaign finance laws. DeKay and his campaign did not include the names and addresses of all his political donors. DeKay’s campaign committee did supply the missing information after being informed of the issue.

=== Marijuana ===
In 2025, Senator Ben Hansen introduced Legislative Bill 677, Change provisions of the Nebraska Medical Cannabis Regulation Act and provide for regulation of medical cannabis which failed to pass. DeKay voted “nay” on passing the bill. DeKay did not want smoking listed as a legal method for cannabis ingestion on public or private property. At the time, he believed pills, oils, and ointments were acceptable forms of use.

=== Internet and Technology ===
DeKay voted to advance Legislative Bill 1092, Adopt the Online Age Verification Liability Act. The bill, which did pass in the legislature and was approved by Governor Jim Pillen, which would require certain websites, such as those that supply pornography, to check a person’s state issued ID or use facial recognition scanning software to guess the age of the user.

=== Taxes ===
After Governor Jim Pillen held town halls across Nebraska with a focus on property taxes, DeKay said he believes “everyone [Nebraskans] should pay a little, instead of a few paying a lot.” He continued “It doesn’t matter what party you’re affiliated with, property tax is going to be playing a part of everybody’s life. We’ve got to try to figure out what’s going to work for everybody.” DeKay does not believe ending income tax cuts will fix Nebraska property tax issues that are being seen.

=== Agriculture and Farming ===
In the 2024 Legislative Session, Dekay introduced Legislative Bill 246, Prohibit cultivated-protein food products under the Nebraska Pure Food Act and provide a deceptive trade practice. The bill, which did pass the Unicameral and was approved by the Governor, bans lab grown meat in Nebraska.

DeKay echoed other Republican views that lab grown meat is an attempt to weaken the Nebraska beef industry and said it’s “elitist.” DeKay created and entered the bill at the behest of Governor Jim Pillen.

=== Foreign Affairs ===
In the 2024 Legislative Session, DeKay introduced Legislative Bill 1301, Adopt the Foreign-owned Real Estate National Security Act, which would set up further parameters that would keep foreign citizens or corporations from purchasing land in Nebraska. The bill was created at the behest of Governor Jim Pillen. The bill, which did pass in the Unicameral and was approved by the Governor, was opposed by the Nebraska ACLU as it encourages “discrimination and harassment.”

An article from Flatwater Free Press noted that those who owned the most farmland in Nebraska were not foreigners, but Ted Turner the founder of Cable News Network CNN; the Church of Jesus Christ of Latter-day Saints; and Bill Gates.

=== Police/Law Enforcement ===
Dekay introduced Legislative Bill 73, Change the number of hours of annual continuing education required for law enforcement officers, in the 2025 session. The bill, which is in Referral as of October 2025, would change the number of continuing education hours required by law enforcement based on population.

As of the end of 2025, law enforcement officers are required to have twenty-eight hours of continuing education every year. The proposed bill would require officers in a county with a population greater than 40,000 people to obtain thirty-two hours of continuing education every year. Officers in a county with less than 40,000 inhabitants would be required to obtain twenty hours of continuing education every year.

== Electoral history ==
Nebraska's 40th Legislative District Election, 2022
Primary election
Party	Candidate	Votes	%
Republican	Barry DeKay	4,443	36.10
Republican	Keith F. Kube	3,180	25.84
Republican	Mark Patefield	3,064	24.89
Republican	Robert E. Johnston	1,621	13.17
Total votes		12,308	100.00
General election
Republican	Barry DeKay	9,486	59.36
Republican	Keith F. Kube	6,494	40.64
Total votes		15,980	100.00
Republican hold			
