= Cally Ideus =

American politician

Member-elect of the Nebraska Legislature from the 30th district
- Assuming office January 6, 2027
- Succeeding: Myron Dorn

Personal details
- Party: Republican
- Website: Campaign website

Cally Ideus is an American politician from the Nebraska Republican Party who is the senator-elect for the 30th district in the Nebraska Legislature. She was elected in the 2026 general election. The district in southeast Nebraska, includes Gage County and part of Lancaster County. She is a veteran and a businesswoman. She supports term limits.
