= Christy Armendariz =

American politician (born 1966)

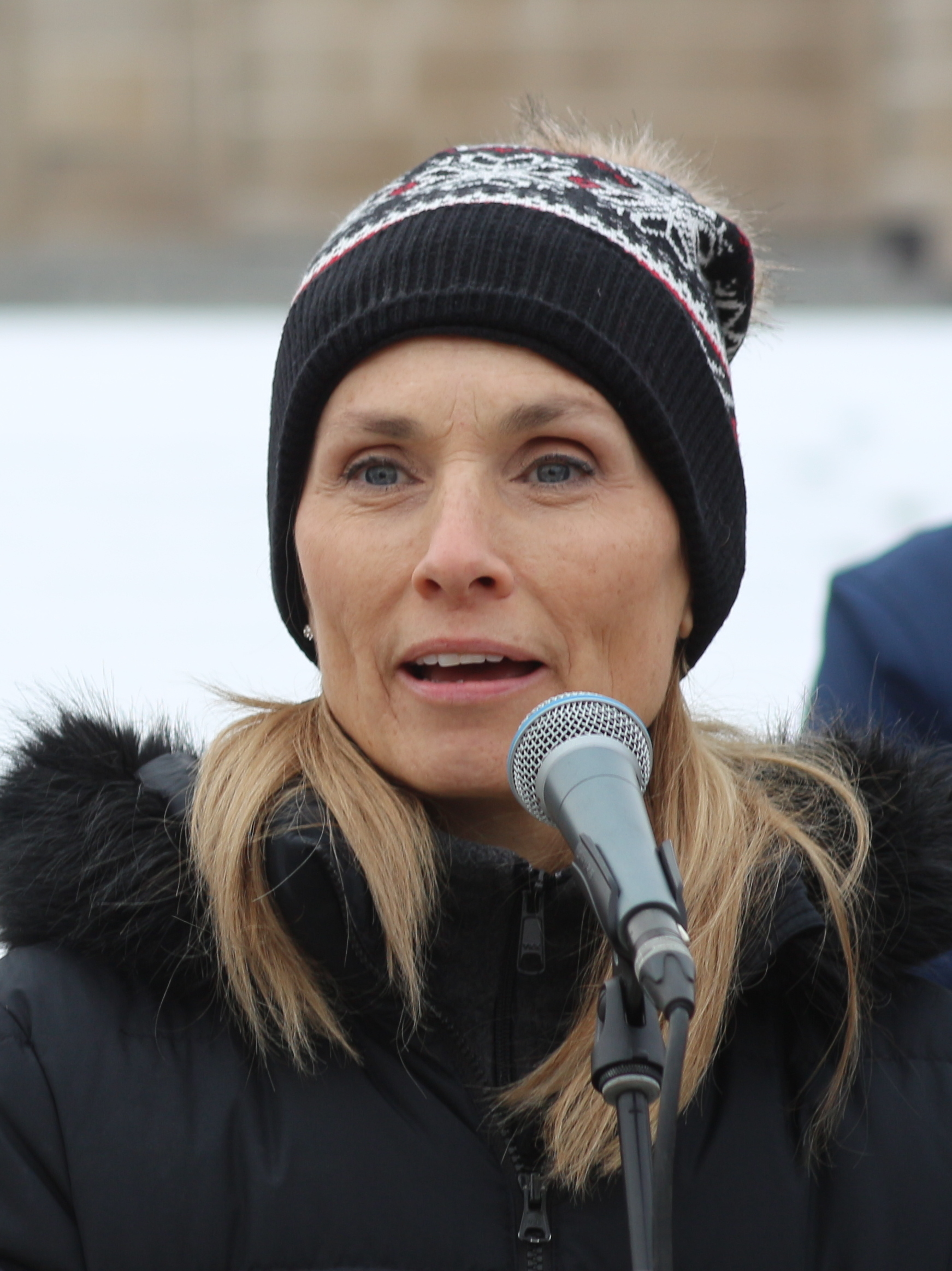
- Armendariz at 2024 Walk for Life in Lincoln

Member of the Nebraska Legislature from the 18th district
- In office January 4, 2023 – January 7, 2027
- Preceded by: Brett Lindstrom
- Succeeded by: Jess Goldoni

Personal details
- Born: December 10, 1966 (age 59) Omaha, Nebraska
- Party: Republican
- Spouse: Ralph Armendariz
- Education: University of Nebraska at Omaha (BS); Nebraska Methodist College (MBA)
- Occupation: Strategic sourcing specialist
- Website: Campaign

Christy Armendariz (born December 10, 1966) is a member of the Nebraska Legislature for District 18 from Omaha, Nebraska. Her term will officially end on January 7, 2027.

== Personal life ==
Armendariz was born and raised in Omaha, Nebraska and is a graduate of the University of Nebraska Omaha with a Bachelors of Science in Business Administration. She also holds a Master's of Business Administration from Nebraska Methodist College.

Armendariz works as a strategic sourcing specialist for Nebraska Methodist Health System.

Armendariz married her husband, Ralph, in 1991. Together they have three children. She attends St. Elizabeth Ann Seton Catholic Church in Omaha.

== Electoral history ==
Nebraska's 18th legislative district election, 2022
Primary election
Party	Candidate	Votes	%
Democratic	Michael Young	2,498	34.53
Republican	Christy Armendariz	2,379	32.88
Republican	Clarice Jackson	2,358	32.59
Total votes		7,235	100.00
General election
Republican	Christy Armendariz	7,430	56.23
Democratic	Michael Young	5,784	43.77
Total votes		13,214	100.00
Republican hold			

== Nebraska State Legislature ==
Armendariz was elected to the Nebraska Legislature on November 8, 2022. In September 2025, she announced she will not seek reelection as a Nebraska state senator in 2026 when her term ends.

She served as the vice chairperson of the Committee on Committees and of the Appropriations Committee in 2025.

District 18 of Nebraska's Legislative District includes the northwest portion of Omaha and the town of Bennington.

=== Resolutions ===
In 2025, Armendariz had three legislative resolutions for interim studies that were referred to the appropriate committees for approval:

- LR441 - Interim study to examine the impact of local housing regulations on Nebraska's housing supply, which has been referred to the Urban Affairs Committee. This resolution seeks to examine how state and local zoning ordinances and building regulations effect the housing market in Nebraska.
- LR259 - Interim study to examine the feasibility, benefits, and framework for establishing a high school agriculture student exchange program within Nebraska modeled after foreign student exchange programs, which has been referred to the Education Committee. The purpose of this resolution is to "examine the feasibility, benefits, and framework for establishing a high school agriculture student exchange program within Nebraska modeled after foreign student exchange programs to foster cross-regional learning, cultural exchange, and deeper appreciation for Nebraska's agricultural heritage and rural life."
- LR258 - Interim study to examine a philanthropic endowment and location to host a week-long camp for certain children who live in low-income urban areas to learn about agriculture, which has been referred to the Agriculture committee. The purpose of this resolution is to "examine a philanthropic endowment and location to host a week-long camp for children nine to twelve years of age who live in low-income urban areas in order to give them an opportunity to experience and learn about agriculture and agriculture careers to potentially address workforce issues in rural areas."

=== LGBTQA+ ===
In 2023, Armendariz was criticized for admitting she did not understand why a proposed anti-trans bill that included language about restricting gender-affirming care was getting so much attention. She voted for the bill, which ended up passing in the Unicameral by one vote. Armendariz is also against adding the terms "sexual orientation" and "gender identity" as a protected class in Nebraska's anti-discrimination law.

=== Abortion rights ===
Armendariz is pro-life and against abortion.

=== Gun rights ===
Armendariz has said that she needs to learn more about conceal and carry permits before landing on an opinion; however, she does believe in background checks before purchasing a firearm.

=== Marijuana ===
Armendariz is against certain forms of marijuana, voting to pass Legislative Bill (LB 316), Prohibit conduct relating to hemp other than cannabidiol products and change provisions of the Nebraska Hemp Farming Act and the Uniform Controlled Substances Act.

=== School choice and education ===
Armendariz is for more educational options for parents, particularly in low-income areas by using a tax credit program.

=== Crime ===
Armendariz voted yes for Legislative Bill (LB 530), Change provisions relating to motor vehicle homicide, motor vehicle homicide of an unborn child, tampering with an electronic monitoring device, controlled substances violations, adult and juvenile probation, detention of juveniles, motorists passing stopped vehicles or vulnerable road users, and speed limits, which allows for ten-year-old children to be held in youth detention. The prior law had a minimum that a youth be twelve years old.

=== Death penalty ===
Armendariz is against the death penalty.

=== Healthcare ===
Armendariz is for expanded Medicaid (known as Nebraska Access in Nebraska) for low-income mothers.

=== Immigration ===
Armendariz is for allowing DACA recipients to be eligible for tuition (in-state only), driver's licenses, and professional work licenses.
