= Adam Morfeld =

American politician (born 1985)

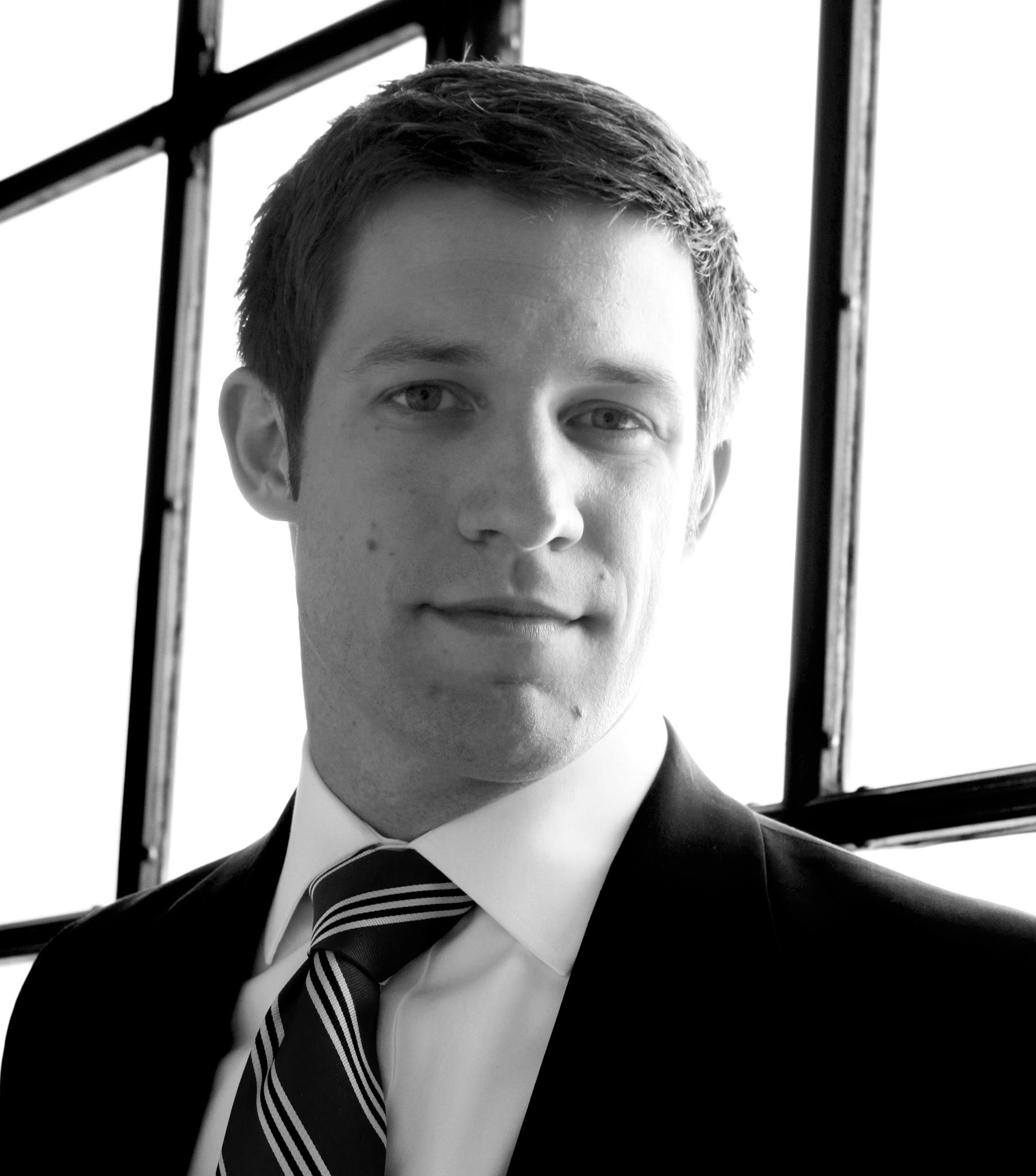

Member of the Nebraska Legislature from the 46th district
- In office January 7, 2015 – January 4, 2023
- Preceded by: Danielle Conrad
- Succeeded by: Danielle Conrad

Personal details
- Born: July 22, 1985 (age 41) Long Beach Naval Station, California, U.S.
- Party: Democratic
- Education: University of Nebraska–Lincoln (BA), University of Nebraska College of Law (JD)
- Website: adammorfeld.com

Adam Morfeld (born July 22, 1985) is an American politician from the state of Nebraska. In 2014, he was elected to the Nebraska Legislature, representing a district in the city of Lincoln. He is also the executive director and founder of a nonprofit organization, Civic Nebraska. Morfeld is a member of the Democratic Party.

== Early life and education ==
Morfeld was born July 22, 1985, at Long Beach Naval Station in California. In 2003, he graduated from Lincoln High School in Sioux Falls, South Dakota.

In 2009, he graduated from the University of Nebraska–Lincoln (UNL) with a BA in political science. He received a Juris Doctor from the University of Nebraska College of Law in 2012. He specializes in voting rights and non-profit administration and compliance.

In 2008, while an undergraduate at UNL, Morfeld founded Nebraskans for Civic Reform (NCR), now called Civic Nebraska. The nonprofit group describes its purpose as advancing civic education, civic health and voting rights work in Nebraska. As of 2020, Civic Nebraska had offices in Lincoln, Omaha, Grand Island, and employed over 70 full and part-time staff.

== Political career ==
Morfeld was elected to the Nebraska Legislature in 2014, and was re-elected in 2018. His district lies within Lincoln and includes downtown, the UNL campus, and the northeast part of the city. In the legislature, he serves on the Education Committee, Judiciary Committee, Vice-Chair of Committee on Committees, and a Commissioner on the Education Commission of the States.

In addition, Morfeld is active in leading ballot initiatives in the state. In 2018, he helped lead the successful Medicaid Expansion Ballot Initiative that is estimated to provide healthcare to 90,000 Nebraskans. Morfeld serves as the co-chair of Nebraskans for Medical Marijuana.

Morfeld ran for Lancaster County Attorney in 2022. He narrowly lost to incumbent Republican Pat Condon.
