= Dave Murman =

American politician

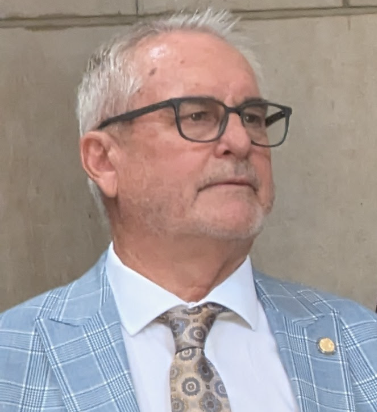

Member of the Nebraska Legislature from the 38th district
- Incumbent
- Assumed office January 9, 2019
- Preceded by: John Kuehn
- Succeeded by: Tim Anderson (elect)

Personal details
- Born: June 30, 1953 (age 73) Hastings, Nebraska, U.S.
- Party: Republican
- Spouse: Kathy Hinrichs (m. 1977)
- Children: 3
- Education: University of Nebraska–Lincoln (BS)

Dave Murman (born June 30, 1953) is an American politician serving as a member of the Nebraska Legislature from the 38th district. Elected in November 2018, he assumed office on January 9, 2019.

== Early life and education ==
Murman was born in Hastings, Nebraska, and raised on his family's farm. After graduating from Sandy Creek High School, he earned a Bachelor of Science degree in animal science from the University of Nebraska–Lincoln in 1976.

== Career ==
Murman worked as an EMT for Glenvil Fire and Rescue. He was also the president of the Nebraska State Dairy Association. He was elected to the Nebraska Legislature in November 2018 and assumed office on January 9, 2019.

== Electoral history ==
Nebraska's 38th Legislative District Election, 2022
Primary election
Party	Candidate	Votes	%
Republican	Dave Murman (incumbent)	6,822	66.7
Libertarian	Tyler R. Cappel	3,406	33.3
Total votes		10,228	100.00
General election
Republican	Dave Murman (incumbent)	9,368	65.06
Libertarian	Tyler R. Cappel	5,031	34.94
Total votes		14,399	100.00
Republican hold			
