= Brett Lindstrom =

American politician (born 1981)

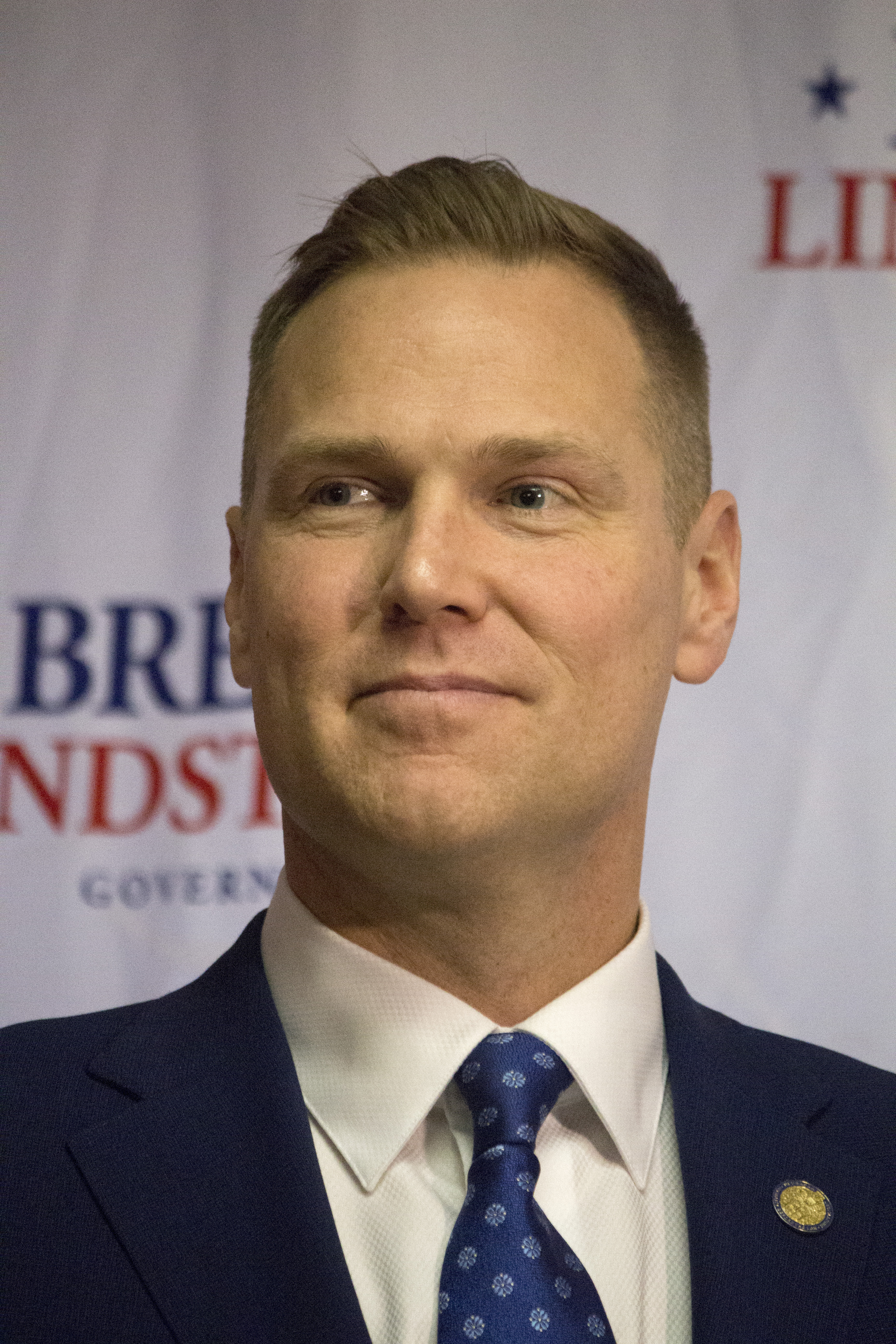
- Lindstrom in 2022

Member of the Nebraska Legislature from the 18th district
- In office January 7, 2015 – January 4, 2023
- Preceded by: Scott Lautenbaugh
- Succeeded by: Christy Armendariz

Personal details
- Born: March 23, 1981 (age 45) Lincoln, Nebraska, U.S.
- Party: America First (2026–present)
- Other political affiliations: Republican (before 2026); Independent (2026)
- Spouse: Leigh Ancona (m. 2007)
- Children: 3
- Education: University of Nebraska–Lincoln (BS)
- Website: Campaign website

Brett R. Lindstrom (born March 23, 1981) is an American politician and former member of the Nebraska Legislature from the 18th district. In 2012, he unsuccessfully ran for a Nebraska seat in the U.S. Congress, losing to incumbent Lee Terry in the Republican primary election. In 2014, he was elected to the Nebraska Legislature, representing an Omaha district. Lindstrom lost the Republican primary for the 2022 Nebraska gubernatorial election to Jim Pillen. He was a candidate in the 2026 election in Nebraska's 2nd congressional district before dropping out in January 2026. He is a candidate for Governor of Nebraska in 2026, running as a member of the America First Party; he previously ran as an independent, but failed to qualify for the ballot.

== Early life and education ==
Lindstrom was born in Lincoln, Nebraska. He was raised in Omaha, where he graduated from Millard West High School in 1999. He attended the University of Nebraska–Lincoln, graduating in 2004 with a Bachelor of Science degree in history. At the university, he joined the Nebraska Cornhuskers football team as a walk-on, playing in five games as a back-up quarterback.

== Career ==
Lindstrom returned to Omaha, where he worked with his father, Dan Lindstrom, as a financial advisor.

=== 2012 congressional election ===
In 2012, Lindstrom made his first bid for elective office, running for Nebraska's 2nd District seat in the U.S. Congress. He was one of four Republicans challenging the incumbent, Republican Lee Terry; the others were railroad worker Paul Anderson; Glenn Freeman, a onetime Douglas County Republican chairman; and Jack Heidel, chairman of the mathematics department at the University of Nebraska Omaha.

In his campaign, Lindstrom accused Terry of lacking commitment to conservative principles. He took Terry to task for voting for an increase in the United States debt ceiling without demanding a balanced budget amendment in return; and he condemned Terry's efforts to speed approval of the proposed Keystone XL pipeline, calling Terry "unequivocally beholden to corporate lobbyists and special interests" and accusing him of defending "corporate special interests over the Nebraska taxpayer" In debate, Terry counterattacked, declaring that a Lindstrom press release on the pipeline "sounded like it came from the Democratic Party".

Lindstrom led the challengers in fundraising, although his receipts were an order of magnitude less than Terry's. Terry won the Republican primary election with 60.0% of the vote; Lindstrom came in second, with 22.8%, trailed by Heidel with 11.0%, Freeman with 3.9%, and Anderson with 2.2%. Terry went on to win the general election, defeating the Democrats' candidate, Douglas County treasurer John Ewing Jr., by a margin of 50.8%–49.2%.

=== Nebraska Legislature ===
==== 2014 election ====
In 2014, Lindstrom ran for the Nebraska Legislature from the 18th District in northwestern Omaha. Incumbent Scott Lautenbaugh, a Republican, was ineligible to seek re-election under Nebraska's term-limits law.

Four candidates sought the position. Lindstrom, a Republican, described himself as a fiscal conservative. Chad Adams, a carpenter, called himself a "blue-collar, small-government Republican with libertarian leanings". Mike Tesar, a retired Omaha chief deputy prosecutor, had been a Democrat for most of his life, but had re-registered as an independent in 2013; he condemned the Legislature's recent decision not to expand Medicaid under the provisions of the 2010 Affordable Care Act. Joe Vaughn, a chef, stated that he was running as an independent to allow voters to choose someone who was not a member of one of the two major parties, declaring that both were corrupt and represented "the special interests and wealthy donors"; he had unsuccessfully attempted to gather enough signatures to run as an independent in the 2012 2nd District congressional election.

In the nonpartisan primary election, Lindstrom placed first, with 1689 votes, or 45.8% of the total. Tesar came in second, with 1301 votes (35.2%). Vaughn and Adams trailed, with 449 votes (12.2%) and 252 votes (6.8%) respectively.

As the top two vote-getters, Lindstrom and Tesar moved on to the general election, in which taxes figured as a major issue. Lindstrom, calling himself "a committed fiscal conservative", stated that he would work to eliminate the state's income tax, particularly the tax on income from Social Security, and the state's inheritance tax. Tesar called the elimination of many of these taxes impractical, stating that a certain level of taxation was necessary to maintain essential services, among which he included medical care and health insurance for all, an educational system that would enable graduates to obtain good jobs, adequate law enforcement, and alcohol- and drug-treatment programs in prisons.

When the election was held, Lindstrom won the seat, with 4907 votes, or 54.9% of the total; Tesar garnered 4031 votes or 45.1%.

==== 2015 session ====
In the 2015 session of the Legislature, Lindstrom was appointed to the Banking, Commerce, and Insurance Committee, and to the Natural Resources Committee. He ran for the chair of the Nebraska Retirement Systems Committee, in defiance of an unwritten rule under which freshman legislators did not run for leadership posts, losing by a 24–25 vote to incumbent Jeremy Nordquist. The closeness of the vote was attributed in part to the influx of conservative senators after the 2014 election; Nordquist, a Democrat, had supported the Affordable Care Act and the proposal to expand Medicaid in Nebraska thereunder, and a 2014 referendum that increased the state's minimum wage.

=== 2022 Nebraska gubernatorial election ===
Lindstrom, a state senator at the time, came in third for the Republican primary for the 2022 Nebraska gubernatorial election in a competitive race shaped by intra-party divisions and the influence of former President Donald Trump. His opponents included Charles Herbster, a businessman endorsed by Trump, and Jim Pillen, a University of Nebraska Regent backed by outgoing Governor Pete Ricketts. Ultimately, Pillen won the primary, defeating both Lindstrom and Herbster.

=== 2026 U.S. House election ===
In July 2025, Lindstrom announced his candidacy in Nebraska's 2nd congressional district for the 2026 election. The seat was open following the planned retirement of incumbent Republican Don Bacon. He withdrew from the campaign in January 2026, stating that he did not want to engage with the "divisiveness of modern politics." Shortly after, he changed his party affiliation to nonpartisan.

=== 2026 Nebraska gubernatorial election ===
In July 2026, Lindstrom announced his candidacy for governor of Nebraska as an independent. He submitted over 5,000 signatures to qualify for the ballot on August 4, 2026. However, on August 14, the Secretary of State's office announced that he had failed to collect sufficient valid signatures to qualify for the general election ballot. Despite submitting over 5,000 signatures — more than the 4,000 required to qualify — nearly 2,000 signatures were invalidated mainly due to fraud. Lindstrom's campaign stated that circulators contracted through a professional signature firm "cost the campaign its place" on the ballot. On September 1, Lind announced that he filed to run as a member of the newly formed America First Party.

== Personal life ==
In 2007, he married Leigh Ancona. The couple has three children.
