= Myron Dorn =

State senator for Nebraska (born 1954)

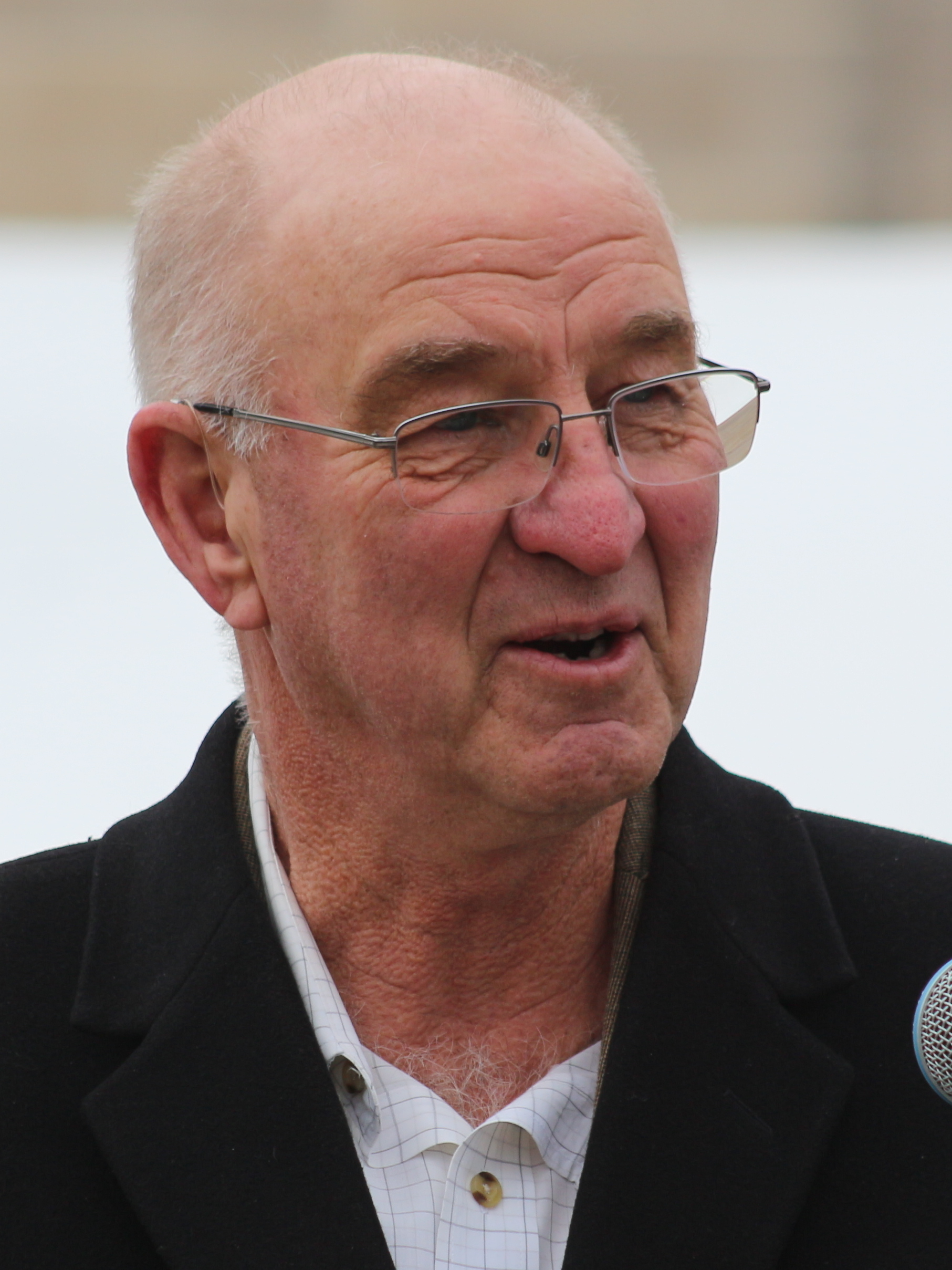

Member of the Nebraska Legislature from the 30th district
- Incumbent
- Assumed office January 9, 2019
- Preceded by: Roy Baker
- Succeeded by: Cally Ideus (elect)

Personal details
- Born: October 23, 1954 (age 72) Beatrice, Nebraska, U.S.
- Party: Republican
- Spouse: Julie Salomons (m. 1979)
- Children: 2
- Education: University of Nebraska–Lincoln (BS)

Myron Dorn (born October 23, 1954) is a state senator for Nebraska from District 30. He is from Adams in Gage County. He is a Republican.

== Personal life ==
Myron Dorn was born in 1954 in Beatrice, Nebraska and graduated from Adams High School in 1972. He then went on to earn a Bachelor’s of Science from the University of Nebraska-Lincoln in 1976.

Dorn has two children with his wife, Julie, who he married in 1979. He works as a farmer in Nebraska.

As of 2025, Dorn is an EMT for Adams Rescue Squad, a council member for American Lutheran Church of Adams, and a member of Nebraska FarmBureau, Nebraska Farmers Union, Nebraska Cattlemen, Nebraska Soybean Association, and Nebraska Corn Growers Association.

== Nebraska State Legislature ==
Dorn was elected to Nebraska State Legislature in 2018 and re-elected in 2022.

As of 2025, Myron Dorn serves as a Member of the Appropriations Committee. He also serves as the Chair for the Legislative Oversight Committee, and a member of the Reference Committee, Building Maintenance, and the Executive Board.

Dorn serves District 30 of Nebraska's Legislative District which includes all of Gage County, Nebraska and a small portion of southeast Lancaster County, Nebraska (with villages Hickman, Panama, and Roca) along with a minuscule portion of the capital city, Lincoln.

=== Government ===
In the 2019 session of the Legislature, Dorn introduced Legislative Bill (LB525), Change provisions relating to the sale of county land in fee simple, which did pass. The bill added new language to an existing law that provides clarification on how a county board can sell county land to another political subdivision.

=== Voting ===
Dorn introduced Legislative Constitutional Amendment (LR24CA) to abolish dividing national votes in favor of a winner-take-all voting system.

=== Healthcare ===
In the legislature’s 2025 session, Dorn proposed Legislative Bill 55 (LB 55), State intent regarding appropriations for medicaid rates for mental health providers. The bill, which did pass, will provide $1,500,000 for the 2025-2026 fiscal year in “reimbursement to mental health providers who do not practice in a hospital and who provide services to medicaid-eligible participants who are eligible for both medicaid and medicare, if there is a lower rate paid under medicare compared to rates paid at the time for medicaid rates for behavioral health services.”

In 2024, Dorn spoke about the urgent need for better healthcare in rural areas, such as nursing homes and assisted living facilities. He introduced Legislative Bills (LB941)State intent regarding appropriations for medicaid assisted-living facility rates and (LB942), State intent regarding appropriations for medicaid nursing facility rates, both of which are indefinitely postposted.

=== Infrastructure ===
In the 2019 legislature session, Dorn introduced Legislative Bill (LB107), Change provisions relating to city and village plumbing boards and change a penalty. The bill did pass into law carrying new language to clean up the prior law such as creating Plumbing Boards instead of a board of examination. The bill also clarified that city and village boards not only create rules for the geographical region, but promulgate them as well.

=== Economy ===
In the 2023 Legislative session, Dorn introduced the Legislative Bill (LB562), Adopt the E-15 Access Standard Act and change provisions of the Beginning Farmer Tax Credit Act, the Nebraska Higher Blend Tax Credit Act, the Nebraska Investment Finance Authority Act, and the Nebraska Pure Food Act, which did pass. The law requires retailers (i.e. commercial gas stations) to sell E-15 gas “from at least fifty percent of all qualifying motor fuel dispensers" by January 2024. The law has further definitions of organizations excluded from the law, required signage, and permitting.

=== Preservation and History ===
In the 2023 Legislative Session, Dorn introduced Legislative Bill (LB563), Appropriate funds to the Nebraska State Historical Society, which was indefinitely postponed. If passed, the bill would have allowed $250,000 from the Nebraska general fund to be used in the 2023-2024 fiscal year. The funding would go to the Nebraska State Historical Society (as known as History Nebraska) to allow for educational programs and preservation for mainstreet communities.

=== Agriculture & Farming ===
In the Summer of 2024, farmers in Nebraska were facing challenges with weather, tax increases on land valuations, and lower crop prices. Dorn, who has decades of farm experience, stated that agriculture is very cyclical and “to make sure agriculture is well represented, the voice of agriculture needs to be very well heard.”

== Electoral history ==
Nebraska's 30th Legislative District Election, 2022
Primary election
Party	Candidate	Votes	%
Republican	Myron Dorn (incumbent)	9,024	100.00
Total votes		9,024	100.00
General election
Republican	Myron Dorn (incumbent)	12,603	100.00
Total votes		12,603	100.00
Republican hold			
