= Mark Kolterman =

American politician

Member of the Nebraska Legislature from the 24th district
- In office January 7, 2015 – January 4, 2023
- Preceded by: Greg L. Adams
- Succeeded by: Jana Hughes

Personal details
- Born: March 16, 1951 (age 75) Seward, Nebraska
- Party: Republican
- Occupation: Insurance professional

Mark Kolterman (born March 16, 1951) is a politician from the state of Nebraska in the Midwestern United States. In 2014, he was elected to the Nebraska Legislature, representing a district in the southeastern part of the state. Kolterman is a member of the Republican Party.

== Personal life and professional career ==
Kolterman was born March 16, 1951, in Seward, Nebraska. He graduated from Seward High School in 1969. From 1969 to 1971, he attended the University of Nebraska–Lincoln; in 1974, he received an associate degree in building construction from Southeast Community College in Milford, Nebraska. He received a bachelor's degree in industrial technology from Peru State College in Peru, Nebraska, in 1994.

Kolterman began working as an insurance professional in 1976. In 1980, he founded Kolterman Agency, Inc., a financial-services firm specializing in employee and executive benefits, estate planning, and investments; as of 2015, he remained co-owner, with his wife, and president of the firm.

In 1971, Kolterman married Suzanne Geis; the couple eventually had two children.

== Political career ==
=== 2014 election ===
In June 2013, Kolterman announced that he would run in the 2014 election for the Nebraska legislature from the 24th District, comprising Polk, Seward, and York Counties. The incumbent, Greg Adams, then the Speaker of the Legislature and a member of the Republican Party, was barred by Nebraska's term-limits law from running for a third consecutive term.

At the time of his announcement of candidacy, Kolterman stated that he favored some sort of expansion of Medicaid, which funds medical expenses for low-income people, if it could be done cost-effectively. In subsequent campaign materials and interviews, he declared that he was entirely opposed to the 2010 Affordable Care Act, and that "I do not support expanding [M]edicaid or other social welfare programs"; his opposition, he stated, was based in part on his belief that the federal government would eventually renege on its pledge to reimburse states for the costs of Medicaid expansion.

Kolterman described himself as "solidly pro-life". Beside defining his position on abortion, he said, this affected his views on capital punishment; although he regarded the death penalty as "an important tool for prosecutors", it should only be used in extreme cases.

Kolterman stated that he was opposed to a proposed increase in Nebraska's minimum wage. He stated that the nation was suffering from an excess of government regulations, while declaring that a certain amount of regulation was necessary.

In the nonpartisan primary election, Republican Kolterman faced Kirk Tesar, a 31-year-old Democrat and a production supervisor for a seed-corn company from York. Tesar was thought to be associated with progressive organization Bold Nebraska, and to have been recruited by opponents of the proposed Keystone XL oil pipeline; one source described him as "outspoken against" the pipeline.

When the primary election was held, Kolterman received 5147 votes, or 80% of the total, to Tesar's 1302 votes (20%). As the top two vote-getters in the primary, both candidates moved on to the general election.

In the course of the campaign, Kolterman raised about $48,000, and spent about $42,000. Tesar did not register a campaign organization with the Nebraska Accountability and Disclosure Commission; candidates who raised less than $5,000 were not required to do so.

Kolterman won the November 2014 general election with 7971 votes, or 80.5% of the total. Tesar obtained 1937 votes, or 19.5%.
