= Tim Gragert =

American politician

Member of the Nebraska Legislature from the 40th district
- In office January 9, 2019 – January 4, 2023
- Preceded by: Tyson Larson
- Succeeded by: Barry DeKay

Personal details
- Born: Timothy J. Gragert; February 26, 1959 (age 67) Creighton, Nebraska, U.S.
- Spouse: Donna Ann Rosen (m. 1987)
- Children: 3
- Education: University of Nebraska–Lincoln (BS)

Military service
- Branch/service: United States Air Force (1977–1981)
- Unit: Nebraska Air National Guard (1982–1985); Nebraska Army National Guard (1985–2017)

Timothy J. Gragert (born February 26, 1959) is an American politician serving as a member of the Nebraska Legislature from the 40th district. Elected in November 2018, he assumed office on January 9, 2019.

== Early life and education ==
Gragert was born and raised in Creighton, Nebraska. He graduated from Creighton Community High School in 1977 and earned a Bachelor of Science degree in natural resources from the University of Nebraska–Lincoln in 1985.

== Career ==
Gragert served in the United States Air Force from 1977 to 1981. He was then a fireman in the Nebraska Air National Guard from 1982 to 1985 and a helicopter pilot in the Nebraska Army National Guard. He also served in the Natural Resources Conservation Service. Gragert was elected to the Nebraska Legislature in November 2018 and assumed office on January 9, 2019. During his first year in the legislature, he authored legislation to create the Healthy Soils Task Force. Gragert did not seek re-election in 2022.
