= 2026 Nebraska Legislature election =

- November 3, 2026; Officially nonpartisan

25 (Note: including 1 special election) of the 49 seats in the Nebraska Legislature 25 seats needed for a majority
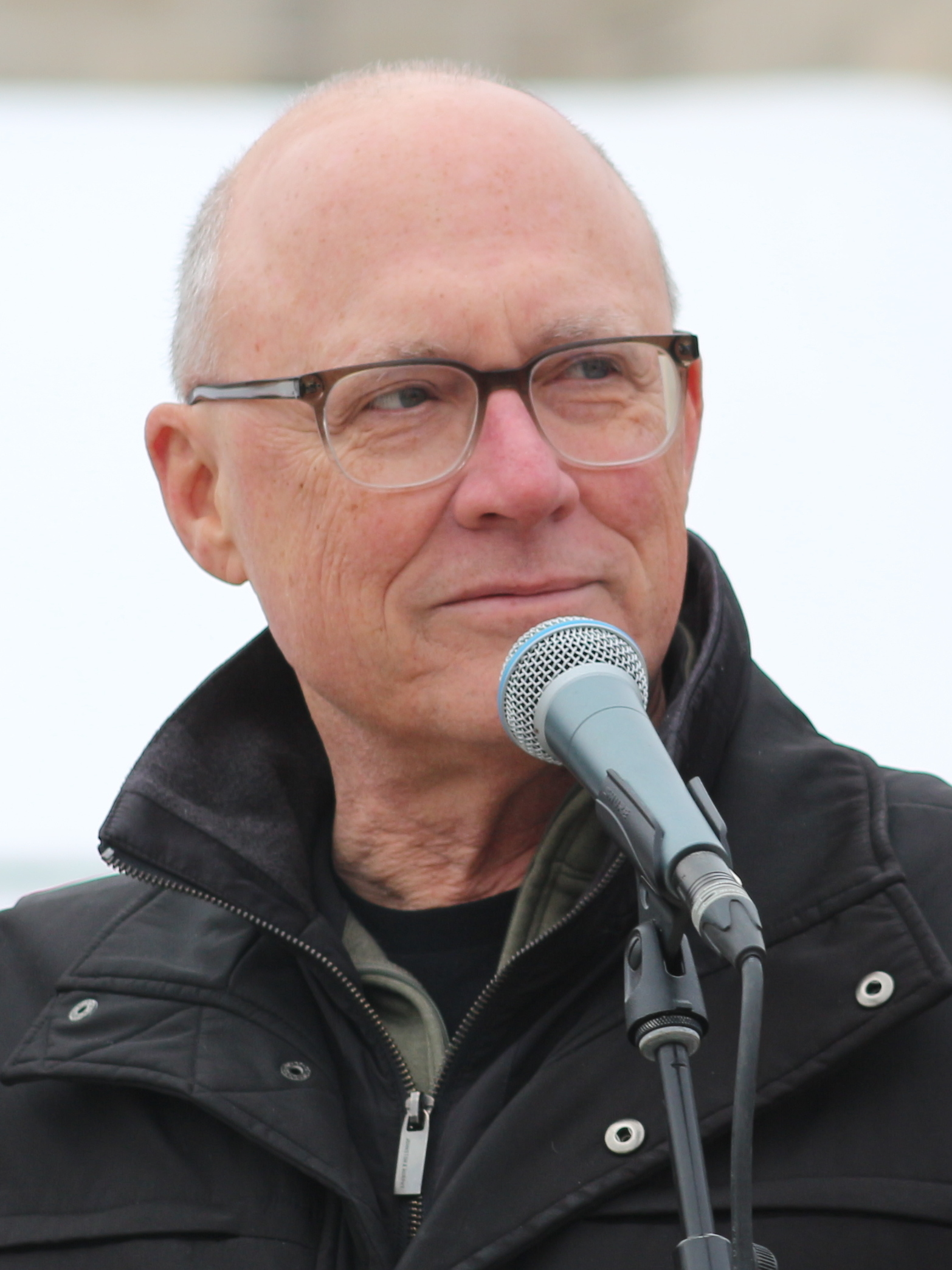

	Majority party	Minority party	Third party
Leader	John Arch (term-limited)	None	None
Party	Republican	Democratic	Independent
Leader since	January 4, 2023	n/a	n/a
Leader's seat	14th district	n/a	n/a
Last election	33	15	1
Seats before	33	15 (Note: Megan Hunt of Omaha was elected as a Democrat but switched party affiliation to Independent in May 2023.)	1
Seats won	30	18	1
Seat change	▼3	▲3	Steady
Seats up	18	6	1
- Results by party Republican hold Democratic hold Democratic gain Independent gain No election
Speaker before election
John Arch
Republican
Elected Speaker
TBD

The 2026 Nebraska Legislature election were held on November 3, 2026, alongside the other 2026 United States elections. Voters elected members of the Nebraska Legislature in half of the U.S. state of Nebraska's 49 legislative districts to serve a two-year term. Primary elections were held on May 12, 2026.

== Background ==
Nebraska's legislature is unicameral and officially nonpartisan, however partisan endorsements and acknowledged party registration makes the de facto partisan affiliation of every legislator known. Bills in the legislature require a two-thirds supermajority to overcome a filibuster, which Republicans gained prior to the 2024 election due to a Democrat who switched parties. They retained this supermajority in the 2024 election, where both parties flipped the same number of seats. Despite their supermajority, Republicans have been unable to pass some of their legislative priorities, such as a near-total abortion ban and mid-decade redistricting, due to opposition from Senator Merv Riepe. Intra-party opposition has also blocked attempts to switch the state's allocation of electoral votes in presidential elections from the congressional district method to a winner-take-all method.

Democrats sought to break Republicans' supermajority in the chamber, which requires a net gain of one seat from the Republicans. This was complicated, however, by the candidacy of Democratic Senator John Cavanaugh, who is not up for re-election until 2028, for the state's second congressional district. If Cavanaugh had won, his seat would have been filled by an unrestricted gubernatorial appointment, likely a Republican, for the remainder of his term. Cavanaugh lost in the primary.

To mitigate this, Democrats invested heavily in a number of seats won by Donald Trump in the 2024 election with backing from the Democratic Legislative Campaign Committee.

== Retirements ==
=== Republican ===
1. District 2: Robert Clements is term-limited.
2. District 14: John Arch is term-limited.
3. District 16: Ben Hansen is term-limited.
4. District 18: Christy Armendariz is retiring.
5. District 22: Mike Moser is term-limited.
6. District 30: Myron Dorn is term-limited.
7. District 32: Tom Brandt is term-limited.
8. District 38: Dave Murman is term-limited.

=== Democratic ===
1. District 6: Machaela Cavanaugh is term-limited.
2. District 10: Wendy DeBoer is term-limited and running for the Public Service Commission.
3. District 28: Jane Raybould is retiring.

=== Independent ===
1. District 8: Megan Hunt is term-limited.

== Summary ==
=== Results by district ===
District	2024 Pres.	Incumbent	Party	Elected Senator	Outcome
2nd	R+24.9	Robert Clements	Rep	Dean Helmick	Rep
4th	R+5.9	Brad von Gillern	Rep	Cindy Maxwell-Ostdiek	Ind
6th	D+15.8	Machaela Cavanaugh	Dem	Patrick Leahy	Dem
8th	D+36.8	Megan Hunt	Ind	Erin Feichtinger	Dem
10th	D+8.2	Wendy DeBoer	Dem	Cindy Johnson	Dem
12th	D+2.3	Merv Riepe	Rep	Christy Knorr	Dem
14th	R+8.7	John Arch	Rep	Bill Bowes	Rep
16th	R+47.6	Ben Hansen	Rep	Ted Japp	Rep
18th	R+1.7	Christy Armendariz	Rep	Jess Goldoni	Dem
20th	D+10.8	John Fredrickson	Dem	John Fredrickson	Dem
22nd	R+59.2	Mike Moser	Rep	Dawson Brunswick	Rep
24th	R+51.4	Jana Hughes	Rep	Jana Hughes	Rep
26th	D+10.2	George Dungan	Dem	George Dungan	Dem
28th	D+33.1	Jane Raybould	Dem	Patty Pansing Brooks	Dem
30th	R+20.8	Myron Dorn	Rep	Cally Ideus	Rep
32nd	R+44.6	Tom Brandt	Rep	Mark Schoenrock	Rep
34th	R+53.4	Loren Lippincott	Rep	Loren Lippincott	Rep
36th	R+23.2	Rick Holdcroft	Rep	Rick Holdcroft	Rep
38th	R+66.4	Dave Murman	Rep	Tim Anderson	Rep
40th	R+70.5	Barry DeKay	Rep	Barry DeKay	Rep
41st (special)	R+64.3	Fred Meyer	Rep	Joe Johnson	Rep
42nd	R+58	Mike Jacobson	Rep	Mike Jacobson	Rep
44th	R+61.9	Teresa Ibach	Rep	Teresa Ibach	Rep
46th	D+13.7	Danielle Conrad	Dem	Danielle Conrad	Dem
48th	R+50.4	Brian Hardin	Rep	Brian Hardin	Rep

=== Maps ===
Combined primary (left) and general (right) election vote share by party. A stripe indicates that the party with the most cumulative votes is different from the partisan affiliation of the incumbent senator.

Republicans 50–60% 60–70% 70–80% 80–90% 90–100%	Democrats 50–60% 60–70% 70–80% 80–90% 80–90%	Independents 50–60%

== District 2 ==
District 2 election
Nominee	Dean Helmick	Caitlin Knutson
Party	Nonpartisan	Nonpartisan
Alliance	Republican	Democratic
Incumbent Senator
Robert Clements
Republican

The 2nd district is represented by Republican Robert Clements, who is term-limited and cannot seek re-election. It encompasses all of Cass County along with parts of eastern Lincoln.

=== Candidates ===
==== Advanced to general ====
- Dean Helmick (Republican), former Cass County GOP chairman
- Caitlin Knutson (Democratic), former special education teacher

==== Eliminated in primary ====
- Jayden Speed (Democratic), university student

==== Endorsements ====
Jayden Speed

Organizations

- Run for Something

==== Results ====
Nebraska's 2nd legislative district election, 2026
Primary election
Party	Candidate	Votes	%
Republican	Dean Helmick	4,679	45.92%
Democratic	Caitlin Knutson	3,381	34.74%
Democratic	Jayden Speed	1,672	17.18%
Total votes		9,732	100.00%

== District 4 ==
District 4 election
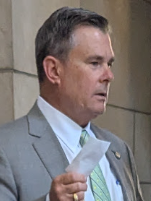

Nominee	Brad von Gillern	Cindy Maxwell-Ostdiek
Party	Nonpartisan	Nonpartisan
Alliance	Republican
Incumbent Senator
Brad von Gillern
Republican

The 4th district is represented by Republican Brad von Gillern, who is running for re-election.

=== Candidates ===
==== Declared ====
- Brad von Gillern (Republican), incumbent State Sentator
- Cindy Maxwell-Ostdiek (Independent), nonprofit president and candidate for the seat in 2022

==== Results ====
Nebraska's 4th legislative district election, 2026
Primary election
Party	Candidate	Votes	%
Independent	Cindy Maxwell-Ostdiek	5,232	53.39%
Republican	Brad von Gillern (incumbent)	4,568	46.61%
Total votes		9,800	100.00%

== District 6 ==
District 6 election
Nominee	Patrick Leahy	Nate Ostdiek
Party	Nonpartisan	Nonpartisan
Alliance	Democratic	Democratic
Incumbent Senator
Machaela Cavanaugh
Democratic

The 6th district is represented by Democrat Machaela Cavanaugh, who is term-limited and cannot seek re-election.

=== Candidates ===
==== Declared ====
- Nate Ostdiek (Democratic), university student
- Patrick Leahy (Democratic), recycling executive

==== Endorsements ====
Nate Ostdiek

Organizations

- Run for Something

==== Results ====
Nebraska's 6th legislative district election, 2026
Primary election
Party	Candidate	Votes	%
Democratic	Patrick Leahy	4,965	59.34%
Democratic	Nate Ostdiek	3,402	40.66%
Total votes		8,367	100.00%

== District 8 ==
District 8 election
Nominee	Erin Feichtinger	Josh Livingston
Party	Nonpartisan	Nonpartisan
Alliance	Democratic	Democratic
Incumbent Senator
Megan Hunt
Independent

The 8th district is represented by Independent Megan Hunt, who is term-limited and cannot seek re-election.

=== Candidates ===
==== Advanced to general ====
- Erin Feichtinger (Democratic), nonprofit policy director
- Josh Livingston (Democratic), Former Deputy Sarpy County and Family Law Attorney

==== Eliminated in primary ====
- Terry Brewer (Republican), pastor and candidate for mayor of Omaha in 2017

=== Results ===
Nebraska's 8th legislative district election, 2026
Primary election
Party	Candidate	Votes	%
Democratic	Erin Feichtinger	5,378	65.70%
Democratic	Josh Livingston	1,470	17.96%
Republican	Terry Brewer	1,338	16.34%
Total votes		8,186	100.00%

== District 10 ==
District 10 election
Nominee	Cindy Johnson	Rebecca Rens
Party	Nonpartisan	Nonpartisan
Alliance	Democratic	Republican
Incumbent Senator
Wendy DeBoer
Democratic

The 10th district is represented by Democrat Wendy DeBoer, who is term-limited and cannot seek re-election.

=== Candidates ===
==== Declared ====
- Cindy Johnson (Democratic), audiologist and education advocate
- Rebecca Rens (Republican), University of Nebraska Medical Center Board of Counselors member

==== Results ====
Nebraska's 10th legislative district election, 2026
Primary election
Party	Candidate	Votes	%
Democratic	Cindy Johnson	4,251	60.10%
Republican	Rebecca Rens	2,822	39.90%
Total votes		7,073	100.00%

== District 12 ==
District 12 election
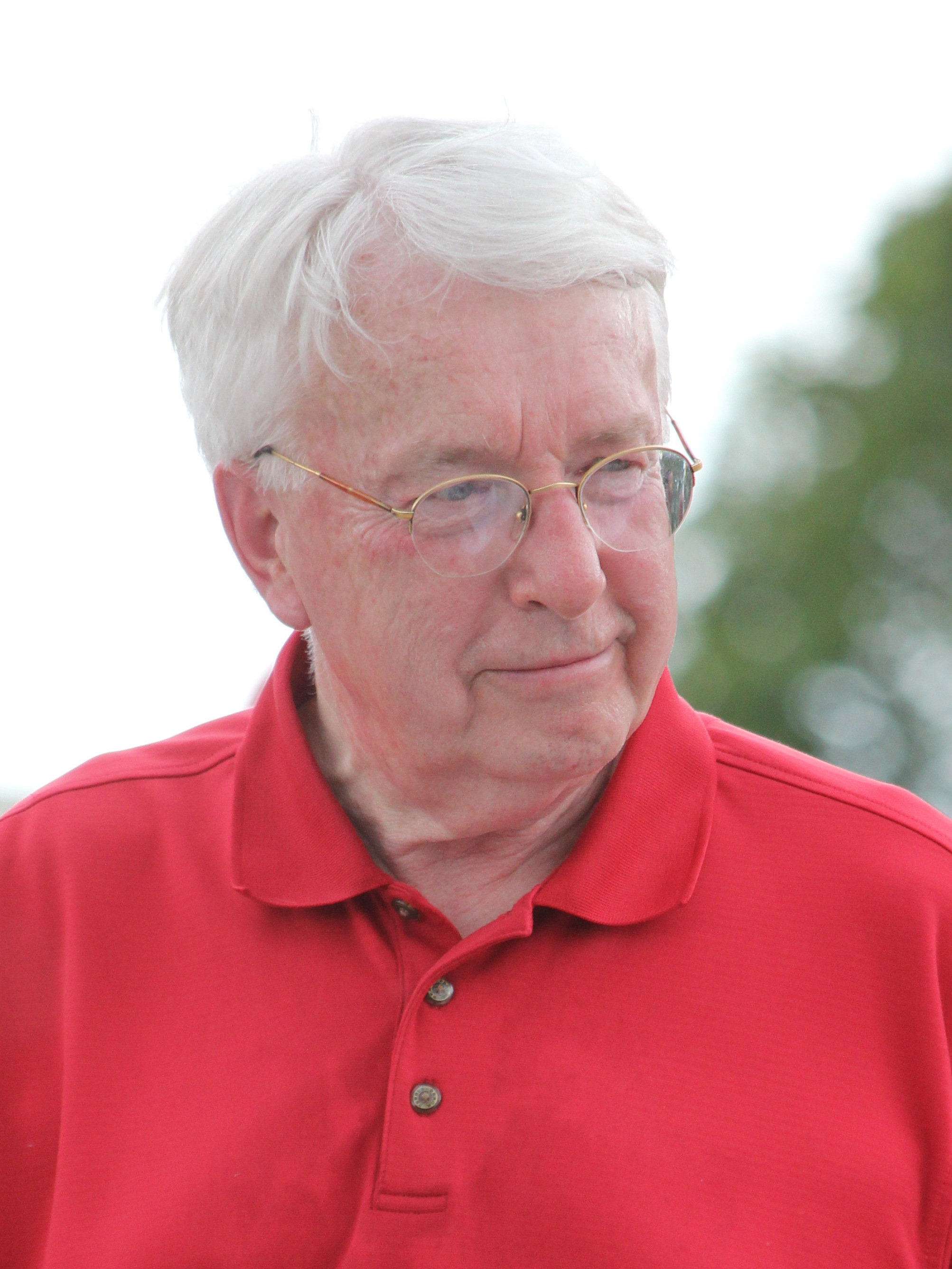

Nominee	Merv Riepe	Christy Knorr
Party	Nonpartisan	Nonpartisan
Alliance	Republican	Democratic
Incumbent Senator
Merv Riepe
Republican

The 12th district is represented by Republican Merv Riepe, who is running for re-election.

=== Candidates ===
==== Advanced to general ====
- Merv Riepe (Republican), incumbent State Senator
- Christy Knorr (Democratic), nurse

==== Eliminated in primary ====
- Thomas Kastrup (Democratic)
- Robin Richards (Democratic write-in), President of the Ralston School Board and candidate for the seat in 2022

=== Results ===
Nebraska's 12th legislative district election, 2026
Primary election
Party	Candidate	Votes	%
Republican	Merv Riepe (incumbent)	2,276	37.11%
Democratic	Christy Knorr	2,123	34.62%
Democratic	Thomas Kastrup	1,395	22.75%
Democratic	Robin Richards (write-in)	310	5.05%
Write-in		29	0.47%
Total votes		6,133	100.00%

== District 14 ==
District 14 election
Nominee	Bill Bowes	SuAnn Witt
Party	Nonpartisan	Nonpartisan
Alliance	Republican	Democratic
Incumbent Senator
John Arch
Republican

The 14th district is represented by Republican John Arch, who is term-limited and cannot seek re-election.

=== Candidates ===
==== Advanced to general ====
- Bill Bowes (Republican), Former Papillion-La Vista fire chief
- SuAnn Witt (Democratic), Papillion La Vista School Board president

==== Eliminated in primary ====
- Jay Jackson (Republican), lawyer and U.S. Air Force Reserve colonel

=== Results ===
Nebraska's 14th legislative district election, 2026
Primary election
Party	Candidate	Votes	%
Democratic	SuAnn Witt	2,797	42.53%
Republican	Bill Bowes	2,231	33.93%
Republican	Jay Jackson	1,548	23.54%
Total votes		6,576	100.00%

== District 16 ==
District 16 election
Nominee	Ted Japp	Cindy Chatt
Party	Nonpartisan	Nonpartisan
Alliance	Republican	Democratic
Incumbent Senator
Ben Hansen
Republican

The 16th district is represented by Republican Ben Hansen, who is term-limited and cannot seek re-election.

=== Declared ===
- Cindy Chatt (Democratic), businesswoman
- Ted Japp (Republican), former Papio-Missouri River Natural Resources District board member

Nebraska's 16th legislative district election, 2026
Primary election
Party	Candidate	Votes	%
Republican	Ted Japp	5,198	63.04%
Democratic	Cindy Chatt	3,048	36.96%
Total votes		8,246	100.00%

== District 18 ==
District 18 election
Nominee	Taylor Royal	Jess Goldoni
Party	Nonpartisan	Nonpartisan
Alliance	Republican	Democratic
Incumbent Senator
Christy Armendariz
Republican

The 18th district is represented by Republican Christy Armendariz, who is retiring.

=== Candidates ===
==== Advanced to general ====
- Jess Goldoni (Democratic), businesswoman
- Taylor Royal (Republican), financial planner and candidate for Nebraska State Treasurer in 2018 and mayor of Omaha in 2017

==== Eliminated in primary ====
- Derek Schwartz (Republican), La Vista police officer

=== Results ===
Nebraska's 18th legislative district election, 2026
Primary election
Party	Candidate	Votes	%
Democratic	Jess Goldoni	3,441	44.53%
Republican	Taylor Royal	2,522	32.64%
Republican	Derek Schwartz	1,764	22.83%
Total votes		7,727	100.00%

== District 20 ==
District 20 election
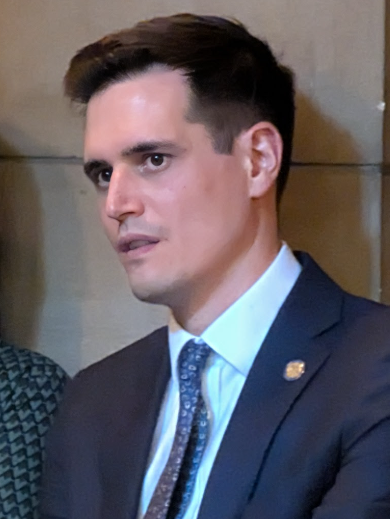

Nominee	John Fredrickson	Chris Anderson
Party	Nonpartisan	Nonpartisan
Alliance	Democratic	Republican
Incumbent Senator
John Fredrickson
Democratic

The 20th district is represented by Democrat John Fredrickson, who is running for re-election.

=== Candidates ===
==== Advanced to general ====
- Chris Anderson (Republican), aerospace industry consultant
- John Fredrickson (Democratic), incumbent State Senator

==== Eliminated in primary ====
- Dan Witt, retired Omaha Public Power District planner

=== Results ===
Nebraska's 20th legislative district election, 2026
Primary election
Party	Candidate	Votes	%
Democratic	John Fredrickson (incumbent)	6,134	59.94%
Republican	Chris Anderson	2,582	25.23%
Republican	Dan Witt	1,517	14.82%
Total votes		10,233	100.00%

== District 22 ==
District 22 election
Nominee	Dawson Brunswick
Party	Nonpartisan
Alliance	Republican
Incumbent Senator
Mike Moser
Republican

The 22nd district is represented by Republican Mike Moser, who is term-limited and cannot seek re-election.

=== Candidates ===
==== Declared ====
- Dawson Brunswick (Republican), Columbus-area Chamber of Commerce president

=== Results ===
Nebraska's 22nd legislative district election, 2026<
Primary election
Party	Candidate	Votes	%
Republican	Dawson Brunswick	4,938	100.00%
Total votes		4,938	100.00%

== District 24 ==
District 24 election
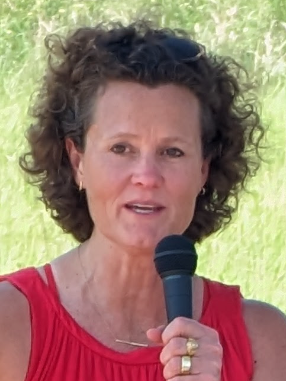

Nominee	Jana Hughes	Dan Winter
Party	Nonpartisan	Nonpartisan
Alliance	Republican
Incumbent Senator
Jana Hughes
Republican

The 24th district is represented by Republican Jana Hughes, who is running for re-election.

=== Candidates ===
==== Declared ====
- Jana Hughes (Republican), incumbent State Senator
- Dan Winter

=== Results ===
Nebraska's 24th legislative district election, 2026
Primary election
Party	Candidate	Votes	%
Republican	Jana Hughes (incumbent)	5,179	75.13%
Nonpartisan	Dan Winter	1,714	24.87%
Total votes		6,893	100.00%

== District 26 ==
District 26 election
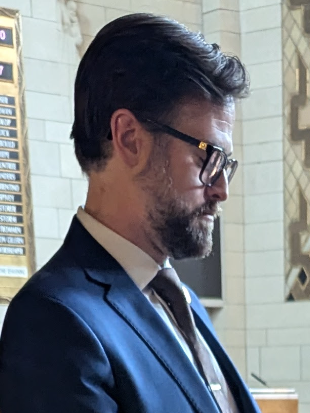

Nominee	George Dungan III	Tobias Howard
Party	Nonpartisan	Nonpartisan
Alliance	Democratic	Republican
Incumbent Senator
George Dungan III
Democratic

The 26th district is represented by Democrat George Dungan III, who is running for re-election.

=== Candidates ===
==== Declared ====
- George Dungan III (Democratic), incumbent State Senator
- Tobias Howard (Republican)

=== Results ===
Nebraska's 26th legislative district election, 2026
Primary election
Party	Candidate	Votes	%
Democratic	George Dungan III (incumbent)	4,420	72.44%
Republican	Tobias Howard	1,682	27.56%
Total votes		6,102	100.00%

== District 28 ==
District 28 election
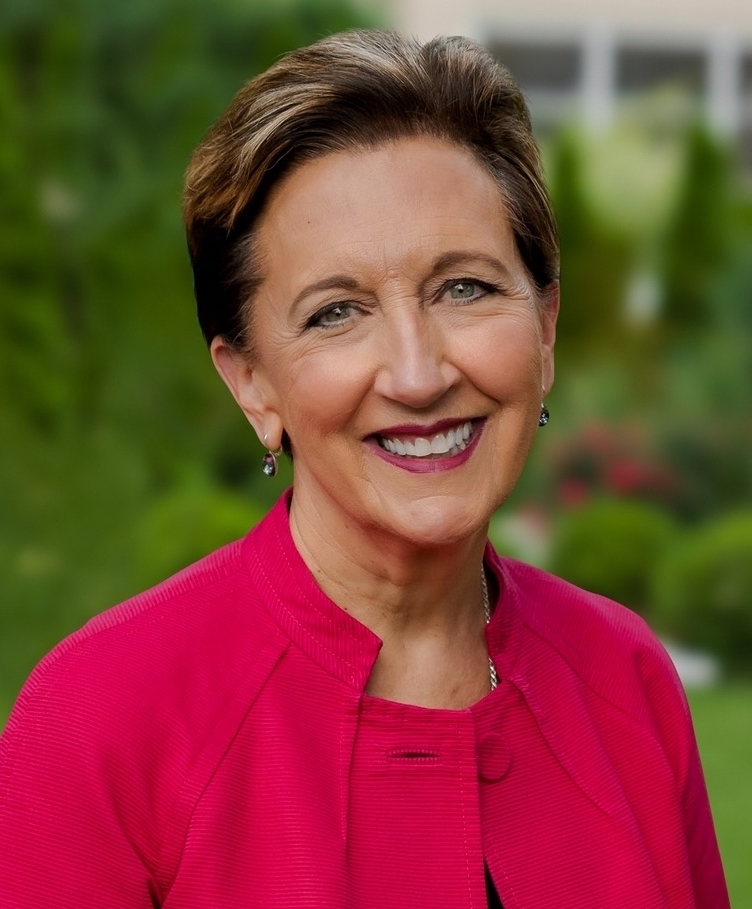

Nominee	Patty Pansing Brooks	Colby Woodson
Party	Nonpartisan	Nonpartisan
Alliance	Democratic
Incumbent Senator
Jane Raybould
Democratic

The 28th district is represented by Democrat Jane Raybould, who announced in June 2025 that she would not seek re-election in 2026.

=== Candidates ===
==== Advanced to general ====
- Patty Pansing Brooks (Democratic), former State Senator
- Colby Woodson (Independent)

==== Eliminated in primary ====
- Chad Kulig

=== Results ===
Nebraska's 28th legislative district election, 2026
Primary election
Party	Candidate	Votes	%
Democratic	Patty Pansing Brooks	5,410	79.65%
Independent	Colby Woodson	941	13.85%
Nonpartisan	Chad Kulig	441	6.49%
Total votes		6,792	100.00%

== District 30 ==
District 30 election
Nominee	Cally Ideus	Janet Bock
Party	Nonpartisan	Nonpartisan
Alliance	Republican	Democratic
Incumbent Senator
Myron Dorn
Republican

The 30th district is represented by Republican Myron Dorn, who is term-limited and cannot seek re-election.

=== Candidates ===
==== Declared ====
- Janet Bock, (Democrat), advanced practice nurse
- Cally Ideus (Republican), insurance agent and nonprofit owner

=== Results ===
Nebraska's 30th legislative district election, 2026
Primary election
Party	Candidate	Votes	%
Republican	Cally Ideus	5,922	56.37%
Democratic	Janet Bock	4,584	43.63%
Total votes		10,506	100.00%

== District 32 ==
District 32 election
Nominee	Mark Schoenrock	Shay Smith
Party	Nonpartisan	Nonpartisan
Alliance	Republican
Incumbent Senator
Tom Brandt
Republican

The 32nd district is represented by Republican Tom Brandt, who is term-limited and cannot seek re-election.

=== Candidates ===
==== Declared ====
- Mark Schoenrock (Republican), Jefferson County Commissioner
- Shay Smith (Independent), attorney

=== Results ===
Nebraska's 32nd legislative district election, 2026
Primary election
Party	Candidate	Votes	%
Republican	Mark Schoenrock	4,513	60.90%
Independent	Shay Smith	2,897	39.10%
Total votes		7,410	100.00%

== District 34 ==
District 34 election
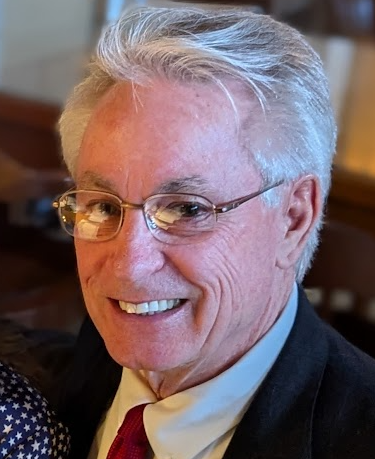

Nominee	Loren Lippincott	Ben Blodgett
Party	Nonpartisan	Nonpartisan
Alliance	Republican	Democratic
Incumbent Senator
Loren Lippincott
Republican

The 34th district is represented by Republican Loren Lippincott, who is running for re-election.

=== Candidates ===
==== Advanced to general ====
- Ben Blodgett (Democrat), electrician
- Loren Lippincott (Republican), incumbent state senator

==== Eliminated in primary ====
- Arron Kowalski (Republican), perennial candidate

=== Results ===
Nebraska's 34th legislative district election, 2026
Primary election
Party	Candidate	Votes	%
Republican	Loren Lippincott (incumbent)	4,611	56.16%
Democratic	Ben Blodgett	2,258	27.50%
Republican	Arron Kowalski	1,342	16.34%
Total votes		8,211	100.00%

== District 36 ==
District 36 election
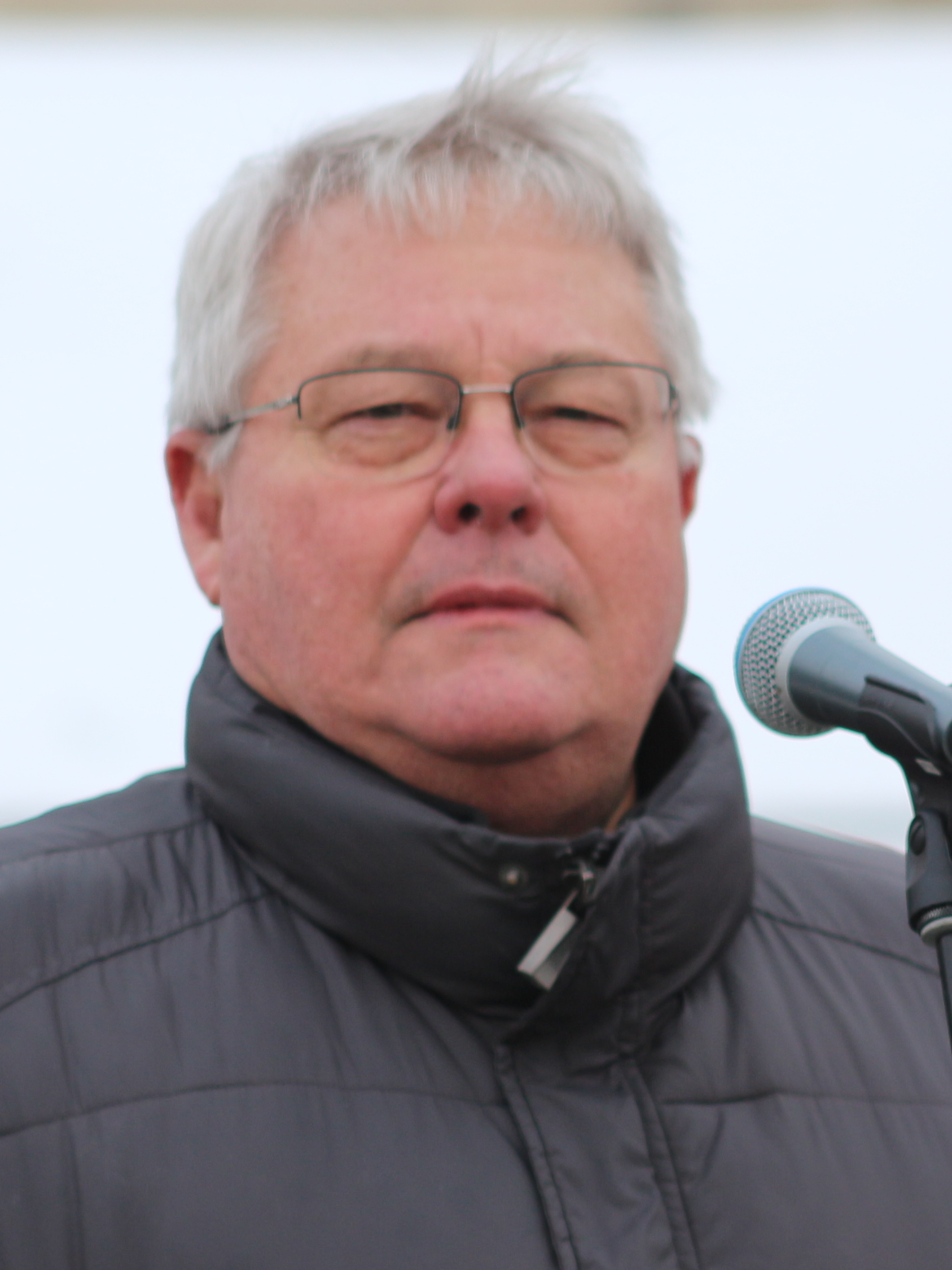

Nominee	Rick Holdcroft	Darin Tompkins
Party	Nonpartisan	Nonpartisan
Alliance	Republican	Democratic
Incumbent Senator
Rick Holdcroft
Republican

The 36th district is represented by Republican Rick Holdcroft, who is running for re-election.

=== Candidates ===
==== Declared ====
- Rick Holdcroft (Republican), incumbent state senator
- Darin Tompkins (Democratic), business leader

=== Results ===
Nebraska's 36th legislative district election, 2026
Primary election
Party	Candidate	Votes	%
Democratic	Darin Tompkins	2,918	52.91%
Republican	Rick Holdcroft (incumbent)	2,597	47.09%
Total votes		5,515	100.00%

== District 38 ==
District 38 election
Nominee	Tim Anderson	Janell Anderson Ehrke
Party	Nonpartisan	Nonpartisan
Alliance	Republican	Republican
Incumbent Senator
Dave Murman
Republican

The 38th district is represented by Republican Dave Murman, who is term-limited and cannot seek re-election.

=== Candidates ===
==== Advanced to general ====
- Tim Anderson (Republican), Mayor of Sutton (2024–present)
- Janell Anderson Ehrke (Republican), Founder and CEO of GROW Nebraska

==== Eliminated in primary ====
- Jon Capps (Republican), Vice Chair of the Webster County GOP
- Melanie Knight (Democratic), Education advocate
- Wes Wilmot (Republican), Vice Chair of Furnas County GOP

=== Results ===
Nebraska's 38th legislative district election, 2026
Primary election
Party	Candidate	Votes	%
Republican	Tim Anderson	3,130	34.57%
Republican	Janell Anderson Ehrke	2,805	30.98%
Republican	Wes Wilmot	1,372	15.16%
Democratic	Melanie Knight	1,031	11.39%
Republican	Jon Capps	715	7.90%
Total votes		9,053	100.00%

== District 40 ==
District 40 election
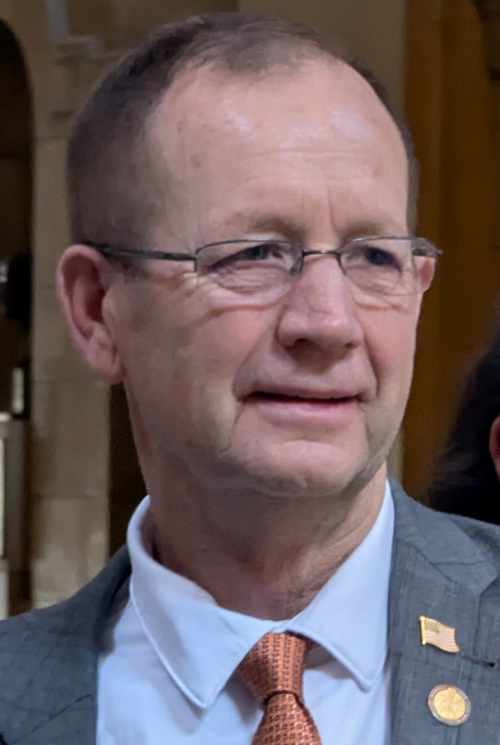
Nominee	Barry DeKay
Party	Nonpartisan
Alliance	Republican
Incumbent Senator
Barry DeKay
Republican

The 40th district is represented by Republican Barry DeKay, who is running for re-election.

=== Candidates ===
==== Declared ====
- Barry DeKay (Republican), incumbent state senator

=== Results ===
Nebraska's 40th legislative district election, 2026
Primary election
Party	Candidate	Votes	%
Republican	Barry DeKay (incumbent)	9,492	100.00%
Total votes		9,492	100.00%

== District 41 (special) ==
District 41 special election
Nominee	Joe Johnson	Jeremy Heneger
Party	Nonpartisan	Nonpartisan
Alliance	Republican
Incumbent Senator
Fred Meyer
Republican

The 41st district is represented by Republican Fred Meyer, who has not announced whether he will run for the seat in the special election. Meyer was appointed to this seat after the resignation of incumbent Dan McKeon, who faced expulsion for sexual misconduct.

=== Candidates ===
==== Advanced to general ====
- Jeremy Heneger
- Joe Johnson (Republican), businessman

==== Eliminated in primary ====
- Jacob W. Sikes (Republican), orthotist

=== Results ===
Nebraska's 41st legislative district election special election, 2026
Primary election
Party	Candidate	Votes	%
Republican	Joe Johnson	3,212	44.39%
Nonpartisan	Jeremy Heneger	2,092	28.91%
Republican	Jacob W. Sikes	1,932	26.70%
Total votes		7,236	100.00%

== District 42 ==
District 42 election
Nominee	Mike Jacobson	Shaylee Scranton
Party	Nonpartisan	Nonpartisan
Alliance	Republican
Incumbent Senator
Mike Jacobson
Republican

The 42nd district is represented by Republican Mike Jacobson, who is running for re-election.

=== Candidates ===
==== Declared ====
- Mike Jacobson (Republican), incumbent state senator
- Shaylee Scranton

=== Results ===
Nebraska's 42nd legislative district election, 2026
Primary election
Party	Candidate	Votes	%
Republican	Mike Jacobson (incumbent)	4,846	74.18%
Independent	Shaylee Scranton	1,687	25.82%
Total votes		6,533	100.00%

== District 44 ==
District 44 election
Nominee	Teresa Ibach
Party	Nonpartisan
Alliance	Republican
Incumbent Senator
Teresa Ibach
Republican

The 44th district is represented by Republican Teresa Ibach, who is running for re-election.

=== Candidates ===
==== Declared ====
- Teresa Ibach (Republican), incumbent state senator

=== Results ===
Nebraska's 44th legislative district election, 2026<
Primary election
Party	Candidate	Votes	%
Republican	Teresa Ibach (incumbent)	4,861	100.00%
Total votes		4,861	100.00%

== District 46 ==
District 46 election
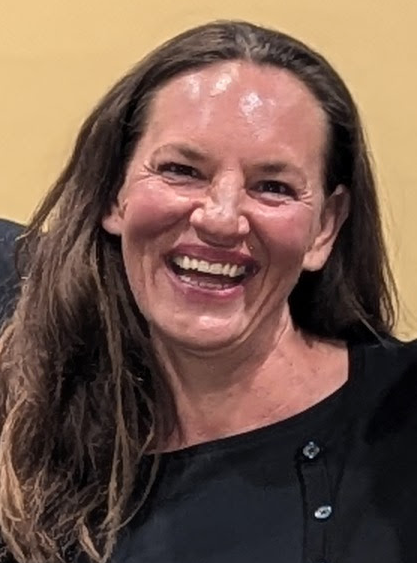
Nominee	Danielle Conrad
Party	Nonpartisan
Alliance	Democratic
Incumbent Senator
Danielle Conrad
Democratic

The 46th district is represented by Democrat Danielle Conrad, who is running for re-election.

=== Candidates ===
==== Declared ====
- Danielle Conrad (Democratic), incumbent state senator

=== Results ===
Nebraska's 46th legislative district election, 2026
Primary election
Party	Candidate	Votes	%
Democratic	Danielle Conrad (incumbent)	2,735	100.00%
Total votes		2,735	100.00%

== District 48 ==
District 48 election
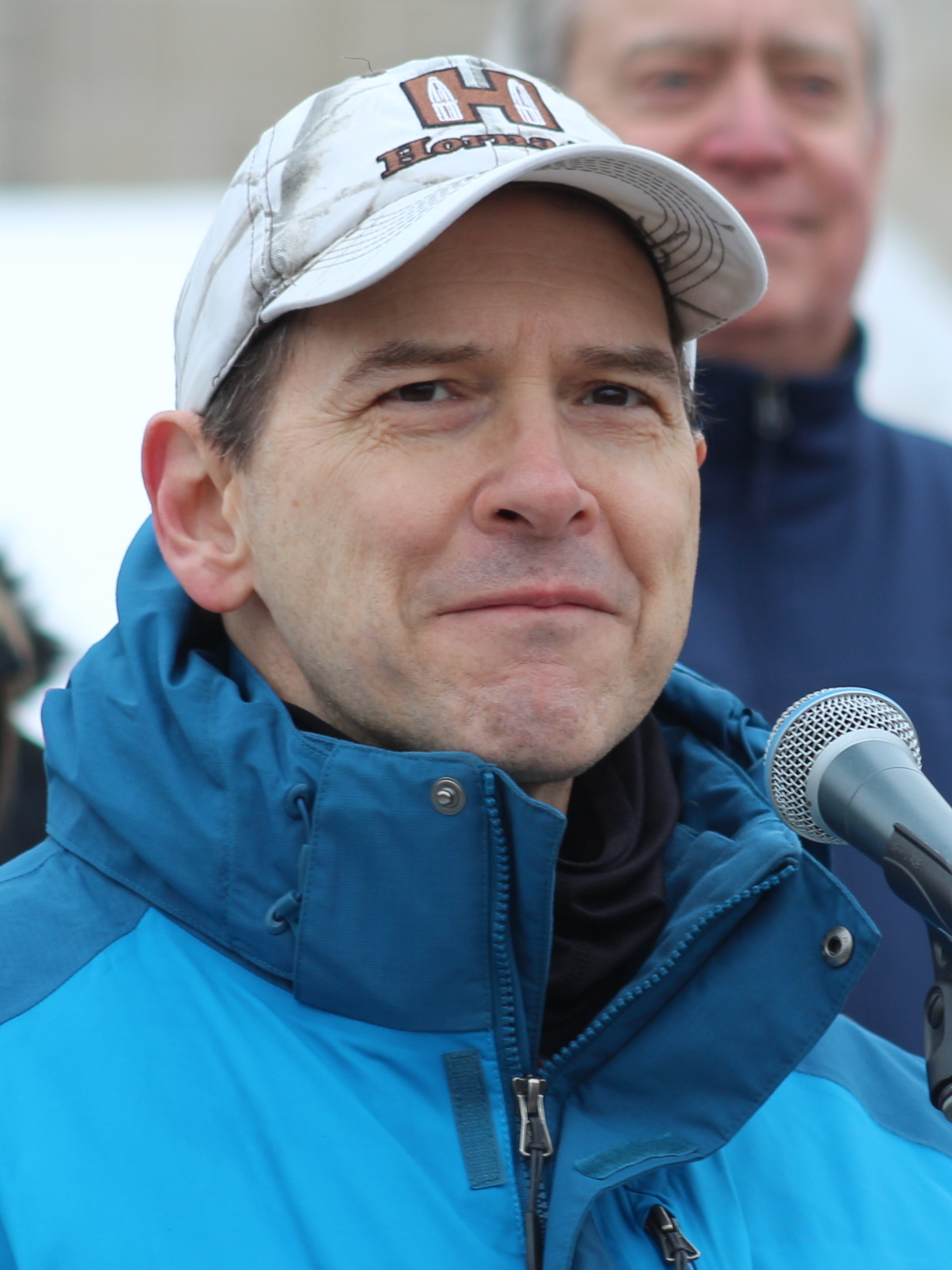

Nominee	Brian Hardin	Tobias Howard
Party	Nonpartisan	Nonpartisan
Alliance	Republican	Republican
Incumbent Senator
Brian Hardin
Republican

The 48th district is represented by Republican Brian Hardin, who is running for re-election.

=== Candidates ===
==== Declared ====
- Brian Hardin (Republican), incumbent state senator
- Jessica Landers, lawyer and former police officer
- Sam Landers, part-time massage therapist
- Kurt Zadina, retired school teacher

=== Results ===
Nebraska's 48th legislative district election, 2026
Primary election
Party	Candidate	Votes	%
Republican	Brian Hardin (incumbent)	2,867	61.26%
Republican	Jessica Landers	880	18.80%
Republican	Kurt Zadina	516	11.03%
Nonpartisan	Sam Landers	417	8.91%
Total votes		4,680	100.00%
