= Nebraska Legislature 44th district =

American legislative district

Nebraska's 44th legislative district
- Map of Nebraska Legislature districts with the 44th district shaded in red
Senator
| Teresa Ibach; R–Sumner |
since 2023
- Demographics: 73.6% White; 3.2% Black; 24.8% Hispanic; 0.5% Asian; 0.8% Native American
- Population (2020): 39,247

The Nebraska Legislature's 44th district is one of the 49 legislative districts in the Nebraska Legislature. The district is located in southwestern Nebraska and covers all of Chase, Dawson, Dundy, Frontier, Gosper, Hayes, Hitchcock, and southwestern Perkins counties. Notable settlements in the area include Lexington, Cozad, Curtis, Imperial, and Grant. Teresa Ibach has represented the district since 2023.

== Demographics ==
The US Census Bureau recorded the population as of 2020 at 39,247.

- 73.6% of the district is White.
- 24.8% of the district is Hispanic.
- 3.2% of the district is Black.
- 0.8% of the district is Native American.
- 0.5% of the district is Asian.

== List of representatives ==
| Representative | Party | Years of service | Legislature | Residence |
|---|---|---|---|---|
| Teresa Ibach | Republican | 2023 - present | 109th | Sumner |
| Dan Hughes | Republican | 2015-2022 | 104th-108th | Venango |
| Mark R. Christensen | Republican | 2007-2014 | 100th-103rd | Imperial |
