= Cindy Maxwell-Ostdiek =

American politician

Member-elect of the Nebraska Legislature from the 4th district
- Assuming office January 6, 2027
- Succeeding: Brad von Gillern

Personal details
- Party: Independent
- Website: Campaign website

Cindy Maxwell-Ostdiek is an American politician who is the senator-elect for the 4th district in the Nebraska Legislature. She was elected in the 2026 general election. She defeated Republican Brad von Gillern. She is a small business owner.
