= Patrick Leahy (Nebraska politician) =

American politician

Member-elect of the Nebraska Legislature from the 6th district
- Assuming office January 6, 2027
- Succeeding: Machaela Cavanaugh

Personal details
- Party: Democratic
- Website: Campaign website

Patrick Leahy is an American politician from the Nebraska Democratic Party who is the senator-elect for the 6th district in the Nebraska Legislature. He was elected in the 2026 general election.
