= Ibach =

Ibach may refer to:

== Places ==
- Ibach, Germany
- Ibach, Switzerland

== People ==
- August Ibach (1918–1988), Swiss footballer
- Greg Ibach, American farmer and government official
- Harald Ibach (born 1941), German physicist
- Karl Ibach (1915–1990), German writer and politician
- Karl Ibach (footballer) (1892–1953), Swiss footballer
- Teresa Ibach (born 1961), American politician from Nebraska

== Other uses ==
- FC Ibach, a football club in Ibach, Switzerland
- Ibach House, a historic home in Munster, Indiana, U.S.
- Rud. Ibach Sohn, a German piano maker
