= Cindy Johnson (politician) =

American politician

Member-elect of the Nebraska Legislature from the 10th district
- Assuming office January 6, 2027
- Succeeding: Wendy DeBoer

Personal details
- Party: Democratic
- Education: University of Florida; University of Kansas
- Website: Campaign website

Cindy Johnson is an American politician from the Nebraska Democratic Party who is the senator-elect for the 10th district in the Nebraska Legislature. She was elected in the 2026 general election. She graduated from the University of Florida and the University of Kansas. She is an audiologist from Omaha, Nebraska.
