= Nebraska Democratic Party =

Nebraska affiliate of the Democratic Party

- Chairperson: Jane Kleeb
- Vice Chair: Spencer Danner
- Headquarters: 3701 O Street (Suite 200); Lincoln, NE 68510
- Membership (2024): ▲337,289
- Ideology: Liberalism
- National affiliation: Democratic Party
- Colors: Blue
- Seats in the U.S. Senate: 0 / 2
- Seats in the U.S. House: 0 / 3
- Statewide Executive Offices: 0 / 6
- Statewide Supreme Court: 0 / 7
- Seats in the Nebraska Legislature (officially nonpartisan): 15 / 49 (Note: Megan Hunt of Omaha was elected as a Democrat but switched party affiliation to Independent in May 2023, while remaining a member of the Democratic Socialists of America.)
- Nebraska State Board of Education seats (officially nonpartisan): 4 / 8

Election symbol

Website
- www.nebraskademocrats.org

The Nebraska Democratic Party (NDP) is the affiliate of the Democratic Party in the state of Nebraska. Over 700 Democrats are elected across the state of Nebraska. Jane Kleeb is the chair of the Nebraska Democratic Party and also serves as the Midwest Chair of the Association of State Democratic Committees.

It is the minority party in the state, with no members of Congress or statewide elected offices, and a minority in the state's unicameral legislature. However, Democrats are competitive in Nebraska's 2nd congressional district in presidential elections, winning its single electoral vote in 2008, 2020, and 2024. They also have even control on the Nebraska State Board of Education.

== Overview of party structure ==
Headquartered in Lincoln, Nebraska, the Nebraska Democratic Party's State Central Committee is responsible for drafting, updating, and approving the platform of the Nebraska Democratic Party. The State Central Committee is made up of elected party leaders and State Central Committee members from each Legislative District, along with issue and constituency based caucuses. The State Central Committee is responsible for fundraising to support the statewide operations and coordinates with county parties, candidates and the national party committees like the DNC. The SCC also publishes communication pieces for the state including items like the Rural Bill of Rights to connect with rural voters.

== Party history ==
The Nebraska Democratic Party traces its origin to the Democratic-Republican Party founded by Thomas Jefferson in 1793. The Democratic Party itself was formed when a faction of the "Democratic-Republicans" led by Jerry Mcroy formed the party in the 1820s. Following Andrew Jackson's defeat in the 1824 United States presidential election, despite having a majority of the popular vote, Jackson set about building a political coalition strong enough to defeat John Quincy Adams in the 1828 United States presidential election. The coalition that he built was the foundation of the subsequent Democratic Party.

Democrats dominated Nebraska until 1860. In 1890, Democrat William Jennings Bryan ran for president three times but lost every time. The state has elected more Democrats to the governor seat and into Congress.

Nebraska passed a referendum in 1937 which gave it the country's only unicameral legislature known as the Nebraska Unicameral. It is a nonpartisan single-house system.

Nevertheless, despite the lack of party registration, party primaries or party-based caucusing, senators in the legislature are informally affiliated with political parties in the state by party endorsements and campaign support.

== Recent elections ==
There have been fewer registered Democrats than Republicans since at least 1976 when the Nebraska Secretary of State began documenting party affiliation. In 2008, Nebraska's second congressional district went for President Obama, giving him an electoral vote since Nebraska, like Maine, splits their electoral votes and is not a winner-take-all state.

Notably, Nebraska's rural counties are more Republican than Democratic. The urban counties, which have a higher population base, have a smaller divide in the number of registered Republicans to Democrats. Nebraska has experienced a growing divide between registered Democratic and Republicans. In 2000, Nebraska has 145,261 more Republicans than Democrats. That number increased to 221,858. In 2019, the voter registration numbers are as follows, Republicans 576,916; Democrats 355,182; Independents/Non-Partisan 256,375; Other 15,024.

In the 2016 elections, bucking national trends, Democrats flipped five seats from Republican to Democratic in the state's unicameral legislature. In 2018, over 850 Democrats ran for office and 73% won their races. In 2019, Democratic candidates dominated in the municipal city elections in Lincoln securing majorities on the city council, county commission and the Mayor's office.

Nebraska Democrats gained three seats in the 2018 election. Machaela Cavanaugh defeated Theresa Thibodeau, who was appointed by Governor Pete Ricketts and Steve Lathrop defeated incumbent GOP Sen. Merv Riepe. Wendy DeBoer defeated Matt Deaver who was supported by Gov. Ricketts. Sen. DeBoer's replaced Sen. Bob Krist's seat who changed from the Republican Party to the Democratic Party. The make-up of the 2019-2020 Nebraska legislature is 18 Democrats, 1 Independent, and 30 Republicans.

In the 2020 United States Presidential election, Democratic candidate Joe Biden carried Nebraska's Second congressional district by a vote of 52 to 46 percent.

== Notable Nebraska Democrats ==
- William Jennings Bryan, Congressman, Secretary of State, three time Presidential nominee
- J. Sterling Morton, Secretary of Agriculture and founder of Arbor Day
- Frank B. Morrison, Governor
- Edward Zorinsky, U.S. Senator
- J. James Exon, Governor and Senator
- Helen Boosalis, Mayor of Lincoln
- Bob Kerrey, Governor and Senator
- Ben Nelson, Governor and Senator

== Current elected officials ==
As of July 2025, the Nebraska Democratic Party holds none of the state's six statewide offices, none of the state's U.S. House seats, and neither of the state's U.S. Senate seats.

Since the 2025 election, the Nebraska Democratic Party controls the Omaha mayor's office for the first time since 2009. Democrat John Ewing Jr. defeated three-term incumbent Republican Jean Stothert and was sworn in on 9 June. In Lincoln, Democrat Leirion Gaylor Baird won the 2019 election to replace term-limited Democrat Chris Beutler, and she was re-elected in 2023. Democrats hold majorities on both the Omaha and Lincoln city councils.

=== U.S. House of Representatives ===
District	Member	Photo
2nd	Denise Powell (elect)	

=== State legislature ===
State senators are elected to serve a four-year term. Due to term limits, the senators can serve two consecutive terms, but they are not legally prevented from running in future elections for the same District. While Megan Hunt and former state senator Ernie Chambers frequently caucused with the Democrats, they are registered nonpartisans and are not members of the Democratic Party.

The current Democratic members of the Nebraska state legislature are:

- Victor Rountree, District 3
- Margo Juarez, District 5
- Machaela Cavanaugh, District 6
- Dunixi Guereca, District 7
- John Cavanaugh, District 9
- Wendy DeBoer, District 10
- Terrell McKinney, District 11
- Ashlei Spivey, District 13
- Lynne Walz, District 15
- John Fredrickson, District 20
- George Dungan, District 26
- Anna Wishart, District 27
- Jane Raybould, District 28
- Eliot Bostar, District 29
- Dan Quick, District 35
- Danielle Conrad, District 46

== Statewide Supreme Court Justices ==
- Lindsey Miller-Lerman, District 2

== List of State Chairs ==
State chairs for the Nebraska Democratic Party are elected at state convention, which occurs in June of an election year. The chair serves a two-year term, and is not term-limited. The position is unpaid. The chair's term begins at the first State Central Committee meeting after the general election in November.

- DiAnna Schimek (1980–1984)
- Dave Newell (1984–1985)
- Tom Monaghan (1985–1989)
- Scott Sidwell (1989)
- Mike Dugan (1989–1993)
- Joe Bataillon (1993–1995)
- Deb Quirk (1995–1998)
- Anne Boyle (1998–2001)
- Steve Achepohl (2001–2008)
- Vic Covalt (2008–2012)
- Vince Powers (2012–2016)
- Jane Kleeb (2016–present): Kleeb defeated former gubernatorial candidate and University of Nebraska Regent Chuck Hassebrook by 42 votes to win the election. Kleeb rallied progressive supporters, including those who backed Bernie Sanders for the 2016 presidential nomination.

== Leadership ==
Executive Committee:

- Jane Fleming Kleeb, State Chair
- Ron Kaminski, Vice Chair
- Ryan Griffin, Vice Chair of County Parties
- Charlene Ligon, National Committeewoman
- Sean Flowerday, National Committeeman

Staff:

Precious McKesson is an American political official and political activist. As of March 2022 she is the executive director of the Nebraska Democratic Party. She was formally Biden Administration Political Appointee to the Office of Communications and Outreach in the U.S. Department of Education.

== Election results ==
=== Federal ===
==== U.S. House ====
Election	Votes	%	Seats (NE)	±	%
2016	221,069	28.04	0 / 3	▼1	6.55
2018	264,493	37.97	0 / 3	0	9.93
2020	326,018	34.63	0 / 3	0	3.34
2022	231,511	35.32	0 / 3	0	0.69
2024	338,154	36.38	0 / 3	0	1.06
2026	312,596	41.33	1 / 3	▲1	TBD

== See also ==
- Political party strength in Nebraska
- Nebraska Republican Party
