= Christy Knorr =

American politician

Member-elect of the Nebraska Legislature from the 12th district
- Assuming office January 6, 2027
- Succeeding: Merv Riepe

Personal details
- Party: Democratic
- Website: Campaign website

Christy Knorr is an American politician from the Nebraska Democratic Party who is the senator-elect for the 12th district in the Nebraska Legislature. She was elected in the 2026 general election. She is a nurse.
