= Bill Bowes (politician) =

American politician

Member-elect of the Nebraska Legislature from the 14th district
- Assuming office January 6, 2027
- Succeeding: John Arch

Personal details
- Party: Republican
- Website: Campaign website

Bill Bowes is an American politician from the Nebraska Republican Party who is the senator-elect for the 14th district in the Nebraska Legislature. He was elected in the 2026 general election.
