= Ted Japp =

American politician

Member-elect of the Nebraska Legislature from the 16th district
- Assuming office January 6, 2027
- Succeeding: Ben Hansen

Personal details
- Party: Republican
- Website: Campaign website

Ted Japp is an American politician from the Nebraska Republican Party who is the senator-elect for the 16th district in the Nebraska Legislature. He was elected in the 2026 general election. He is a small business owner. He supports term limits.
