= Senator Frederickson =

Senator Frederickson or Fredrickson may refer to:

- David Frederickson (born 1944), Minnesota State Senate
- Dennis Frederickson (born 1939), Minnesota State Senate
- John Fredrickson (born 1987), Nebraska State Senate
