= Machaela Cavanaugh =

American politician (born 1979)

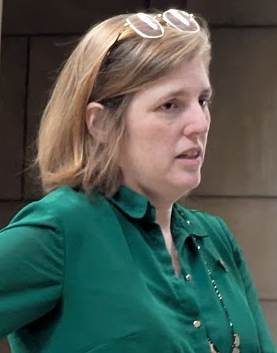
- Cavanaugh in 2025

Member of the Nebraska Legislature from the 6th district
- Incumbent
- Assumed office January 9, 2019
- Preceded by: Theresa Thibodeau
- Succeeded by: Patrick Leahy (elect)

Personal details
- Born: January 17, 1979 (age 47) Washington, D.C., U.S.
- Party: Democratic
- Spouse: Nick Brotzel
- Children: 3
- Parent: John Joseph Cavanaugh III (father) Kate Cavanaugh (mother)
- Relatives: John Cavanaugh (brother)
- Education: University of St. Thomas (BA); University of Nebraska Omaha (MPA)
- Website: Legislative website

Machaela M. Cavanaugh (born January 17, 1979) is an American politician serving in the Nebraska Legislature from the 6th district since 2019 and re-elected in 2022. She is a member of the Democratic Party.

== Personal life ==
Cavanaugh was born on January 17, 1979, in Washington, D.C. She is the daughter of former Nebraska state legislator and U.S. Representative John Joseph Cavanaugh III.

She attended Marian High School in Omaha, Nebraska, and the University of St. Thomas, graduating with a Bachelor of Arts in sociology in 2001. She went on to graduate school at the University of Nebraska Omaha and obtained her Masters in Public Administration (MPA) in 2008.

Cavanaugh and her husband, Nick Brotzel, live in Omaha and have three children. Her brother, John, an Omaha attorney, is the state senator for Nebraska's 9th legislative district.

== Electoral history ==
Nebraska's 6th legislative district election, 2022
Primary election
Party	Candidate	Votes	%
Democratic	Machaela Cavanaugh (incumbent)	4,355	47.82
Republican	Christian Mirch	3,449	37.87
Republican	Elizabeth Hallgren	1,304	14.32
Total votes		9,108	100.00
General election
Democratic	Machaela Cavanaugh (incumbent)	7,969	55.61
Republican	Christian Mirch	6,360	44.39
Total votes		14,329	100.00
Democratic hold			

Nebraska's 6th legislative district election, 2018
Primary election
Party	Candidate	Votes	%
Republican	Theresa Thibodeau (incumbent)	3,641	51.30
Democratic	Machaela Cavanaugh	3,027	42.65
Independent	Ricky Fulton	429	6.04
Total votes		7,097	100.0
General election
Democratic	Machaela Cavanaugh	7,733	50.95
Republican	Theresa Thibodeau (incumbent)	7,445	49.05
Total votes		15,178	100.0
Democratic gain from Republican			

== Nebraska State Legislature ==
As of 2025, Cavanaugh serves as a member on the Appropriations Committee and the Legislative Oversight Committee.

Cavanaugh serves District 6 of Nebraska's Legislature, which covers a portion of Omaha, Nebraska.

=== Paid family leave ===
Cavanaugh describes securing paid family leave for Nebraska workers as her top legislative priority. She introduced Legislative Bill (LB) 311, which would provide up to six weeks of paid leave to care for a relative and up to twelve weeks of paid personal medical leave and paid maternity/paternity leave. The bill would be funded in a manner similar to unemployment insurance, with employers sending a portion of each worker's paycheck to the state to create a fund to pay out benefits to workers who take leave. The maximum benefit would be 66% of the state's average weekly wage. The bill was stalled as a result of opposition from other senators who were concerned about the bill's cost—up to $172 million a year according to the Legislative Fiscal Office—and described the bill as "progressive socialism" at its worst.

=== Creation of private lactation room in Capitol ===
Cavanaugh became the first senator to breastfeed on the Capitol floor. Upon discovering that there were no designated, private spaces for women to breastfeed or pump in the Capitol building, Cavanaugh introduced LB709, which would have required a dedicated nursing station be created for senators, staff, and visitors.

All fourteen female senators in the Nebraska Legislature signed on to the bill. Though the bill languished in the Government, Military and Veterans Affairs Committee, the Nebraska Capitol Commission purchased a lactation station and set up space near the south entrance of the building.

=== LGBTQA+ rights ===
In February 2023, state Senator Kathleen Kauth introduced LB574, known as the "Let Them Grow Act", which would prohibit transgender healthcare for individuals under the age of 19. Cavanaugh, a staunch supporter of transgender rights, pledged to prevent any bill from passing by filibustering all bills. She said, "if this Legislature collectively decides that legislating hate against children is our priority, then I am going to make it painful — painful for everyone," and that she would "burn the session to the ground over this bill". Cavanaugh's filibuster lasted over three weeks, during which she spoke about numerous topics unrelated to legislation, including Girl Scout cookies, Omaha's best doughnuts, and the plot of the film Madagascar.

On March 16, Cavanaugh and the Speaker of the Legislature, John Arch, reached a deal in which the bill would be debated on the floor. The bill reached cloture on March 23, which allowed it to advance to the second of three rounds of debate. The legislature adopted rules changes on March 28 in order to limit the filibustering ability, but Cavanaugh and state senator Megan Hunt had said they would continue to use all of their abilities to prevent bills from passing. The bill was signed into law on May 22, 2023; the provisions relating to transgender healthcare took effect October 1.

Following the bill's passage, Cavanaugh, Hunt, and John Fredrickson founded a political action committee, called "Don't Legislate Hate". The political action committee said that they will support lawmakers who oppose legislation which negatively targets the LGBTQ+ community.

=== Caught Damaging Capitol Exhibit ===
Nebraska State Sen. Machaela Cavanaugh was caught on video vandalizing a Declaration of Independence exhibit at the Capitol.
