= Greg Ibach =

American farmer

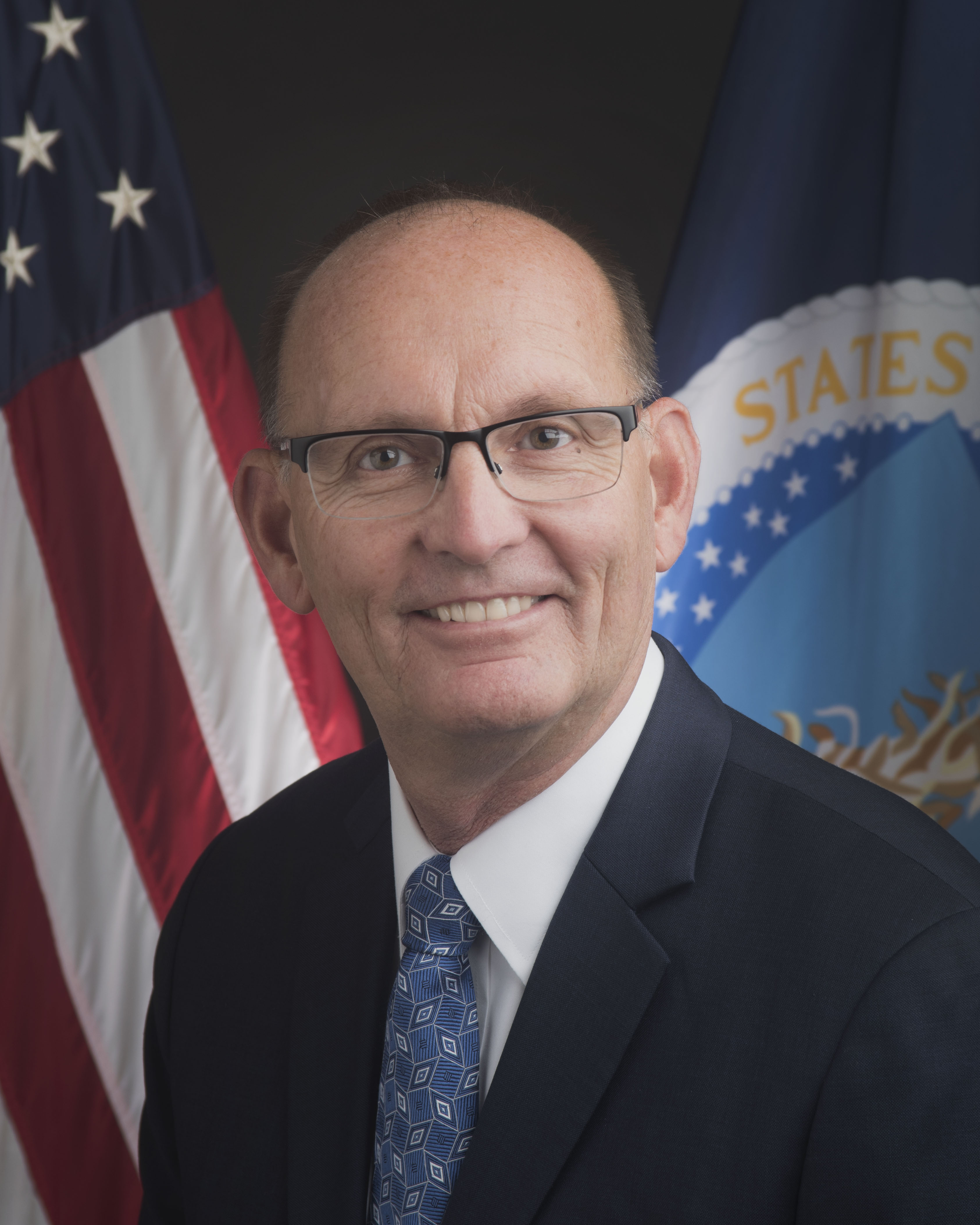

Under Secretary of Agriculture for Marketing and Regulatory Programs
- In office October 30, 2017 – January 20, 2021
- President: Donald Trump
- Preceded by: Edward M. Avalos
- Succeeded by: Jennifer Moffitt

Nebraska Director of Agriculture
- In office June 2005 – October 2017
- Governor: Dave Heineman; Pete Ricketts
- Preceded by: Merlyn Carlson
- Succeeded by: Steve Wellman

Personal details
- Spouse: Teresa Ibach
- Children: 3
- Education: University of Nebraska–Lincoln (BS)

Gregory Ibach is an American farmer and government official from Sumner, Nebraska, who served as the under secretary of agriculture for marketing and regulatory programs. Prior to assuming the role, he was the Nebraska director of agriculture.

== Early life and education ==
In 1980 Ibach graduated from Sumner-Eddyville-Miller High School. He earned a Bachelor of Science in Agriculture from the University of Nebraska–Lincoln with majors in animal science and agricultural economics.

== Career ==
Ibach spent his early career with Farm Credit Services, working as a loan officer and eventually becoming assistant vice president. He is a past president of the National Association of State Departments of Agriculture. Ibach was named Nebraska Director of Agriculture by Nebraska Governor Dave Heineman in June 2005 and was the longest-serving state agriculture director in Nebraska history. Prior to this appointment, he had spent over six years as Nebraska's Assistant Director of Agriculture.

Ibach was nominated by President Donald Trump to become Under Secretary of Agriculture for Marketing and Regulatory Programs on September 5, 2017, and was confirmed by voice vote in the United States Senate on October 26, 2017. He left office on January 20, 2021.

On March 4, 2021, the University of Nebraska–Lincoln announced that their Institute of Agriculture and Natural Resources had appointed Greg Ibach as the inaugural Under Secretary in Residence, who had started this half-time position on February 1, 2021.

== Personal life ==
Ibach is married to wife Teresa. They have three adult children and live on their family farm and ranch in Sumner, Nebraska.

== Awards ==
Ibach has been inducted into the Nebraska Hall of Agricultural Achievement and recognized for contributions to agriculture by the University of Nebraska–Lincoln.
