= Megan Hunt (politician) =

American politician (born 1986)

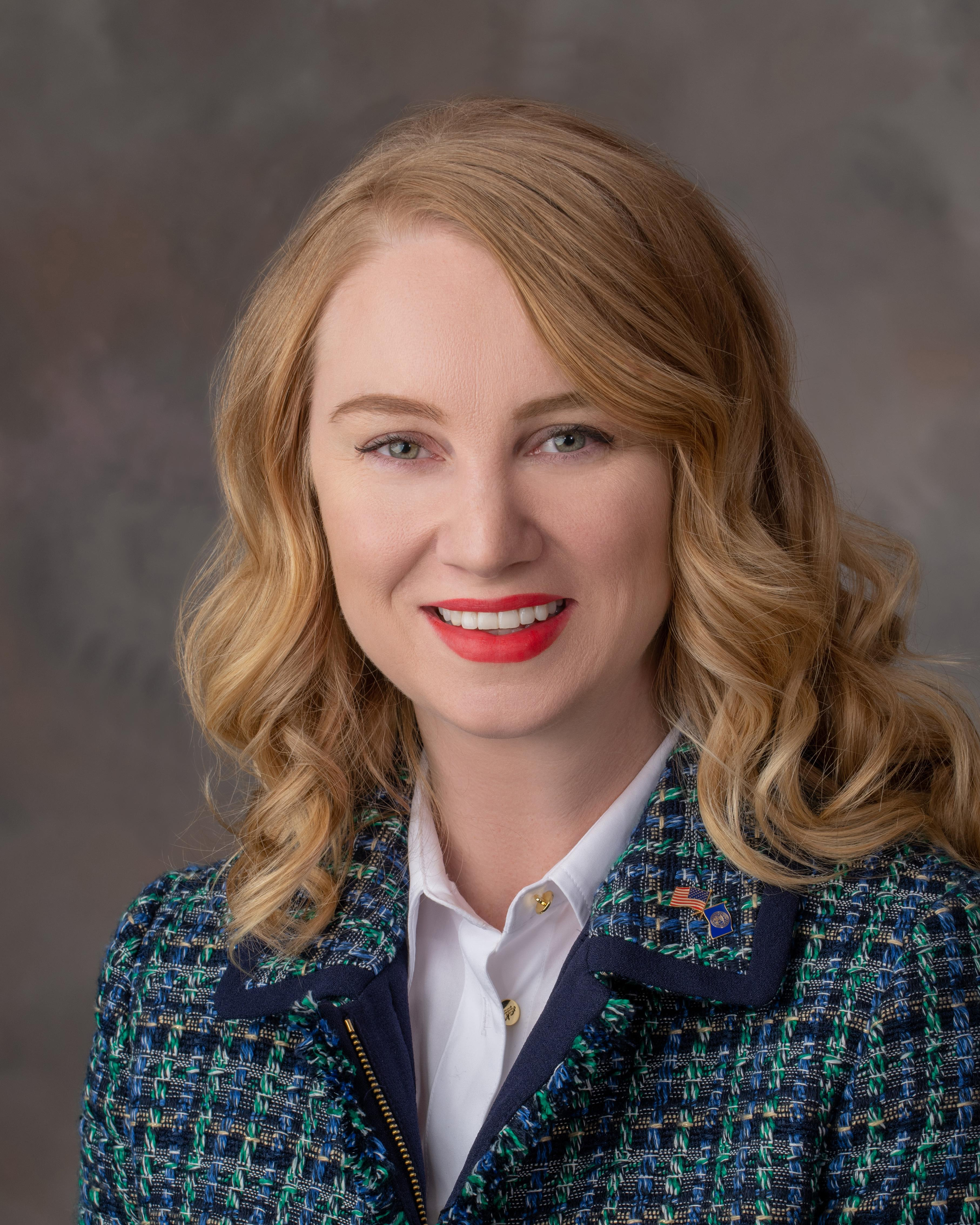
- Hunt in 2018

Member of the Nebraska Legislature from the 8th district
- Incumbent
- Assumed office January 9, 2019
- Preceded by: Burke Harr

Personal details
- Born: Megan Catherine Hunt; May 9, 1986 (age 40) Blair, Nebraska, U.S.
- Party: Independent (2023–present)
- Other political affiliations: Democratic Socialists of America; Democratic (before 2023); Republican (formerly); Libertarian (formerly)
- Children: 1
- Education: Dana College (BA)
- Website: Campaign website

Megan Catherine Hunt (born May 9, 1986) is an American politician serving as a member of the Nebraska Legislature. Hunt represents the 8th legislative district in Omaha, consisting of the midtown neighborhoods of Dundee, Benson, and Keystone. She succeeded term-limited Nebraska State Senator Burke Harr. She identifies as bisexual, and was the first openly LGBT person elected to the state legislature of Nebraska, as well as the first woman to represent the 8th district.

Hunt was strongly critical of the 2021 storming of the United States Capitol. Hunt has been critical of Nebraska Governor Pete Ricketts for not wearing a mask while gathered close to others during the COVID-19 pandemic, his administration's response to the pandemic, and Ricketts's choices and actions surrounding a 2020 contract with an out-of-state company for the provision of COVID-19 testing kits. Hunt also introduced an amendment to let Douglas County, Nebraska, impose a local mask mandate, but later withdrew it.

On May 5, 2023, Hunt announced that she had changed her party registration from Democratic to Independent. She said "the political dysfunction is extreme and at the national level, the parties are ideologically bankrupt." Hunt is a member of the Democratic Socialists of America.

== Early life and education ==
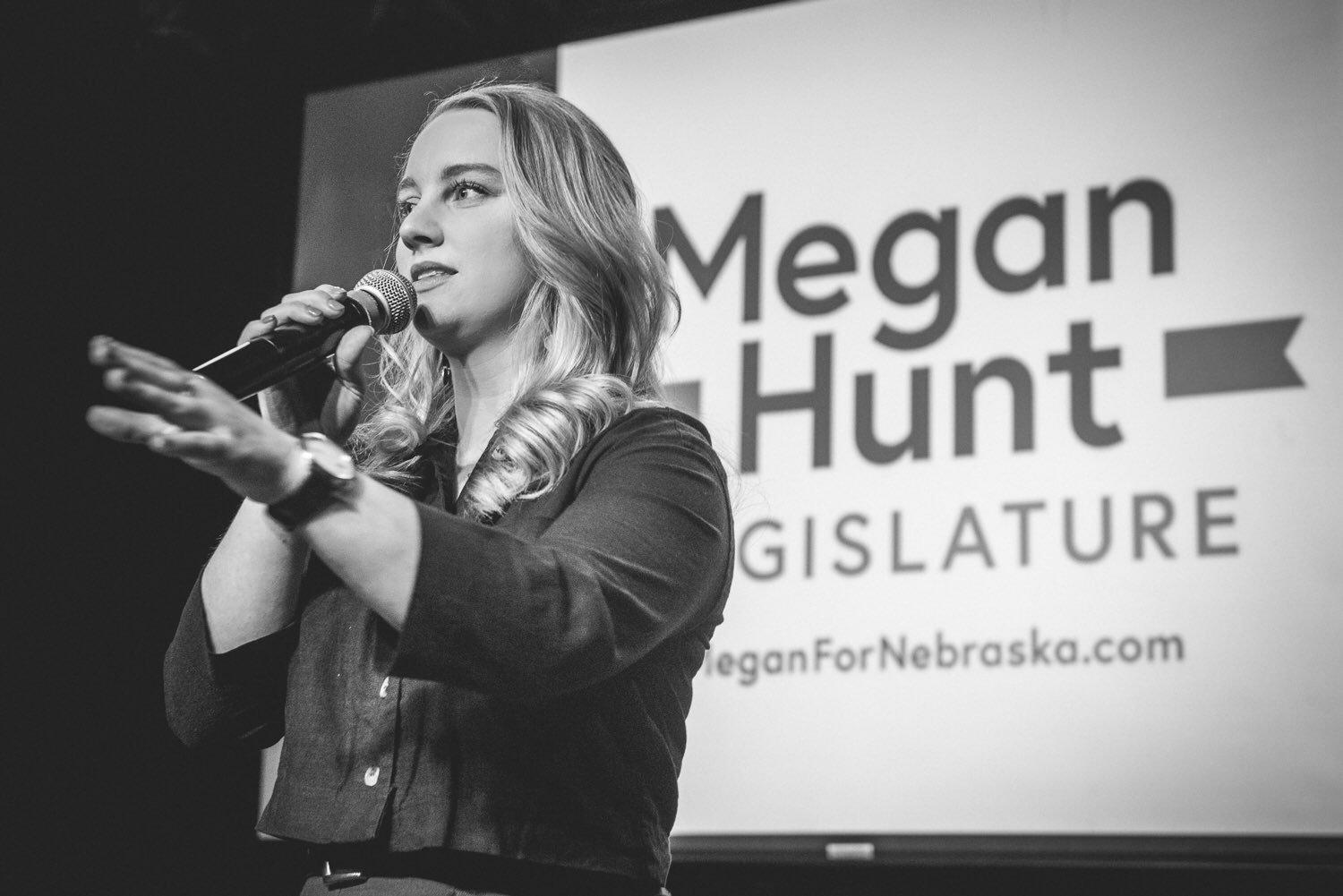
Hunt speaking at a campaign event

Hunt is originally from Blair, Nebraska, but eventually moved to Omaha, Nebraska.

Hunt graduated from Blair High School in Blair, Nebraska, in 2004. Hunt earned a Bachelor of Arts in Intercultural communication and German from Dana College in Blair in 2008.

Hunt has received Shout Magazine's 30 under 30 award. She was also recognized by the Midlands Business Journal in 2011 as a member of their 40 under 40 class, and was also one of Omaha Jaycees' Ten Outstanding Omahans in 2016.

== Career ==
Hunt previously owned a boutique clothing store called Hello Holiday. She also founded Safe Space Nebraska, a nonprofit organization that protects bar patrons from harassment.

== Political career ==
Hunt has also been a trustee of the Business Ethics Alliance since 2014 and has been a member of Friends of Planned Parenthood since 2015. In 2019, she completed Harvard University's John F. Kennedy School of Government program for Senior Executives in State and Local Government as a David Bohnett LGBTQ Victory Institute Leadership Fellow. In 2025, she received the Religious Liberty Award from the American Humanist Association.

=== Nebraska State Legislature ===
Hunt serves on the Business and Labor Committee, the Committee on Committees, the Government, Military and Veteran Affairs Committee, the Urban Affairs Committee, and the State-Tribal Relations Committee. She has sponsored sixty-eight bills during her legislative tenure.

I have been a Republican, an independent, a Libertarian, a Democrat, back to Republican to vote in the primary, back to Democrat... The parties are not the future. The political dysfunction is extreme and at the national level, the parties are ideologically bankrupt.

— Hunt on her political party affiliation

Hunt was one of eleven Nebraska state senators who attempted to call a legislative special session for racial and social justice issues in Nebraska.

==== Political positions and bills introduced ====
===== Abortion =====
Hunt opposes restrictions to access to abortion. In 2019, she opposed legislation that would legalize abortion pill reversal, where healthcare providers could provide information about drugs that can reverse medication-based abortions. In 2020, Hunt opposed legislation that would have made dilation and evacuation in the second trimester illegal. In 2021, she introduced legislation to repeal the state's ban on telemedicine consultations about medication-based abortion.

===== Birth control for survivors of sexual assault =====
Hunt has supported legislation which would require hospitals to inform sexual assault survivors about emergency birth control and make it available to them; the legislation has not yet passed as of January 2023.

===== Climate change =====
Hunt supported legislation which would conduct a study on the effects of climate change in Nebraska, during the 2020 legislative session.

===== Education =====
Hunt has indicated support for making a community college education more affordable for Nebraska students.

===== Food stamps =====
Hunt was previously critical of Nebraska's decision not to re-apply for emergency SNAP benefits during the height of the COVID-19 pandemic. She also introduced Legislative Bill 121 which would allow those with felony drug convictions to qualify for food stamps.

===== LGBTQ rights =====
Hunt supports employment protection laws for LGBT people in the workplace. Along with Senator Machaela Cavanaugh, Hunt engaged in a filibuster of the 2023 session of the Legislature in protest to a bill that would ban gender-affirming healthcare to transgender minors. Hunt, Cavanaugh, and John Fredrickson founded a political action committee known as "Don't Legislate Hate", which aims to support politicians who oppose anti-LGBTQ legislation.

===== Prison reform and drug laws =====
Hunt has stated that Nebraskan prisons should focus more so on rehabilitation. She is in favor of legalizing recreational marijuana and allowing those with previous convictions to have their records expunged. Hunt also believes that investments in early education are required to help reduce the so-called school-to-prison pipeline.

Hunt is opposed to capital punishment. In January 2024, in response to a bill by State Senator Loren Lippincott proposing nitrogen asphyxiation as a new method of execution in Nebraska, Hunt proposed an amendment to Lippincott's bill that would require executions to be carried out by "either lethal injection or legislative firing squad", with the "legislative firing squad" consisting of members of Nebraska's state senate, so lawmakers would have "[an] opportunity to bear responsibility for state-sponsored murder".

===== Voter ID laws =====
Hunt has been critical of voter ID laws and has stated that there is no voter fraud in Nebraska.

== Electoral history ==
Nebraska's 8th Legislative District Election, 2022
Primary election
| Party | Candidate | Votes | % |
|---|---|---|---|
| Democratic | Megan Hunt (incumbent) | 5,225 | 66.26 |
| Republican | Marilyn Arant Asher | 1,846 | 23.41 |
| Republican | Katie Opitz | 815 | 10.33 |
| Total votes | | 7,886 | 100.00 |
General election
| Democratic | Megan Hunt (incumbent) | 9,322 | 69.37 |
| Republican | Marilyn Arant Asher | 4,116 | 30.63 |
| Total votes | | 13,438 | 100.00 |
| Democratic hold | | | |

Nebraska's 8th Legislative District Election, 2018
Primary election
| Party | Candidate | Votes | % |
|---|---|---|---|
| Democratic | Megan Hunt | 3,284 | 56.38 |
| Democratic | Mina Davis | 1,299 | 22.30 |
| Democratic | Josh Henningsen | 1,242 | 21.32 |
| Total votes | | 5,825 | 100.0 |
General election
| Democratic | Megan Hunt | 7,634 | 64.11 |
| Democratic | Mina Davis | 4,274 | 35.89 |
| Total votes | | 11,908 | 100.0 |
| Democratic hold | | | |

== Personal life ==
Hunt is a single mother. She is an atheist.

== See also ==
- List of Democratic Socialists of America who have held office in the United States
