= Rick Holdcroft =

American politician

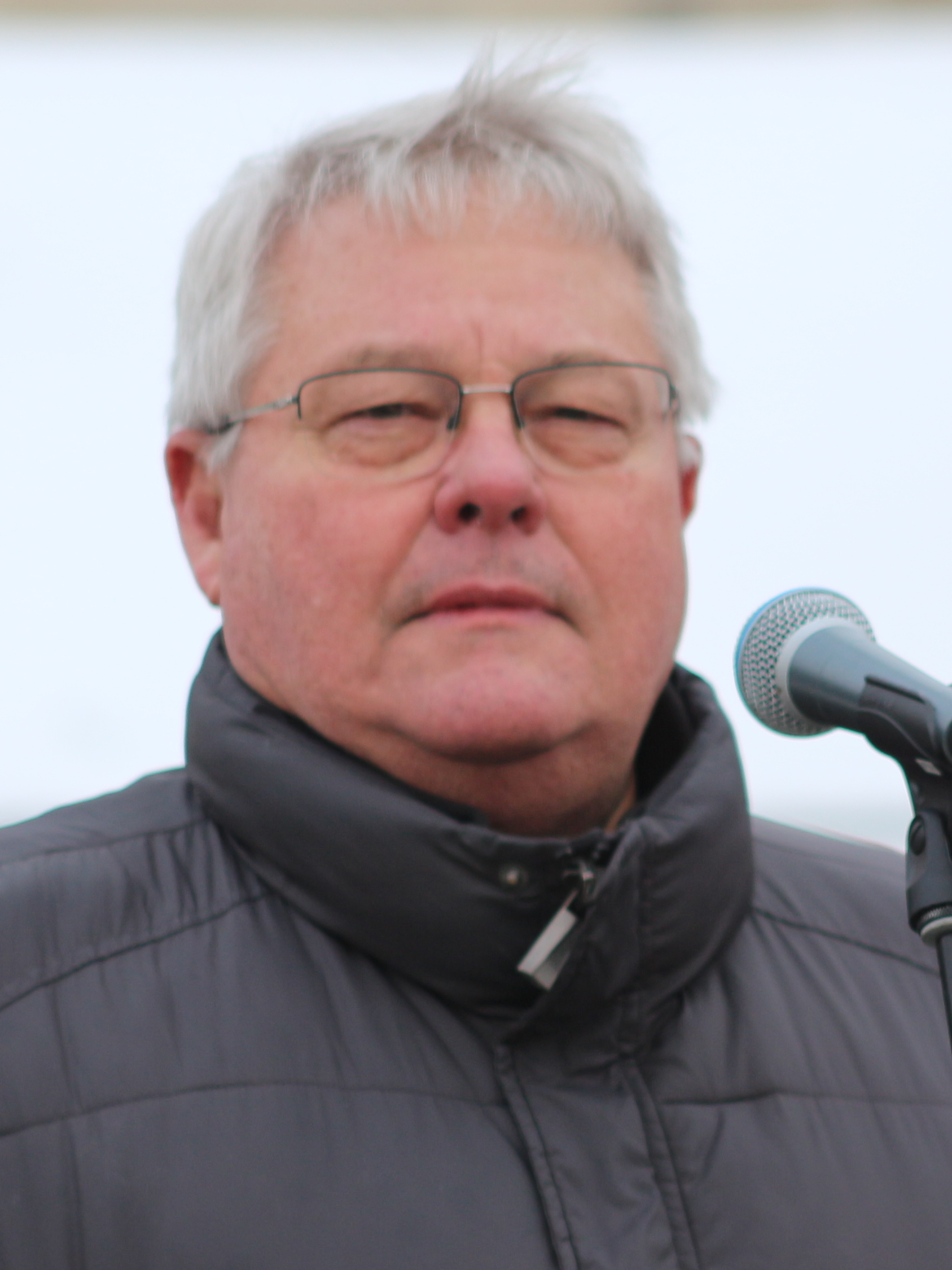

Member of the Nebraska Legislature from the 36th district
- Incumbent
- Assumed office January 4, 2023
- Preceded by: Matt Williams

Personal details
- Born: January 8, 1954 (age 72)
- Party: Republican
- Spouse: Mary Jo Heinen
- Children: 5
- Education: University of Nebraska–Lincoln (BS); Naval Postgraduate School (MS)
- Website: Campaign

Rick Holdcroft is a member of the Nebraska Legislature for District 36 from Bellevue, Nebraska. He was elected to the Nebraska Legislature on November 8, 2022. Holdcroft is the first senator to serve District 36 since it was relocated to Sarpy County after the Nebraska Legislature's 2021 redistricting. Holdcroft served in the United States Navy for 28 years.

== Political positions ==
Holdcroft is pro-life and says he supports the decision of the United States Supreme Court in Dobbs v. Jackson Women's Health Organization.

On January 7, 2026, Holdcroft introduced Legislative Bill 767, known as the Certified Help Options in Claims Expertise (CHOICE) for Veterans Act. The legislation seeks to establish a state-level regulatory framework for private, non-accredited entities that charge fees for assisting with veterans' benefit claims, a role the U.S. Department of Veterans Affairs (VA) historically restricts to accredited attorneys and Veterans Service Officers (VSOs).

== Electoral history ==
Nebraska's 36th Legislative District Election, 2022
Primary election
Party	Candidate	Votes	%
Republican	Rick Holdcroft	3,465	51.36
Democratic	Angie Lauritsen	3,282	48.64
Total votes		6,747	100.00
General election
Republican	Rick Holdcroft	8,188	55.96
Democratic	Angie Lauritsen	6,444	44.04
Total votes		14,632	100.00
Republican hold			
