= Ben Hansen =

American politician, businessman, and chiropractor

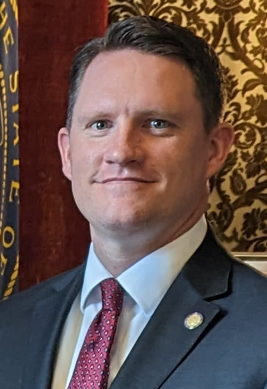

Chair of the Executive Board of the Nebraska Legislature
- Incumbent
- Assumed office January 8, 2025
- Preceded by: Ray Aguilar

Member of the Nebraska Legislature from the 16th district
- Incumbent
- Assumed office January 9, 2019
- Preceded by: Lydia Brasch
- Succeeded by: Ted Japp (elect)

Personal details
- Born: June 29, 1979 (age 47) Schuyler, Nebraska, U.S.
- Party: Republican
- Spouse: Jill
- Children: 1
- Education: Central Community College (AS); Wayne State College (BS); Palmer College (DC)

Ben Hansen (born June 29, 1979) is an American politician, businessman, and chiropractor serving as a member of the Nebraska Legislature from the 16th district. Elected in November 2018, he assumed office on January 9, 2019. On January 8, 2025, he was elected as the chair of the executive board of the legislative council for the Nebraska Legislature.

== Early life and education ==
Hansen was born in Schuyler, Nebraska. He earned an Associate of Science degree from Central Community College in 2000, a Bachelor of Science in psychology from Wayne State College in 2002, and a Doctor of Chiropractic from Palmer College of Chiropractic in 2007.

== Career ==
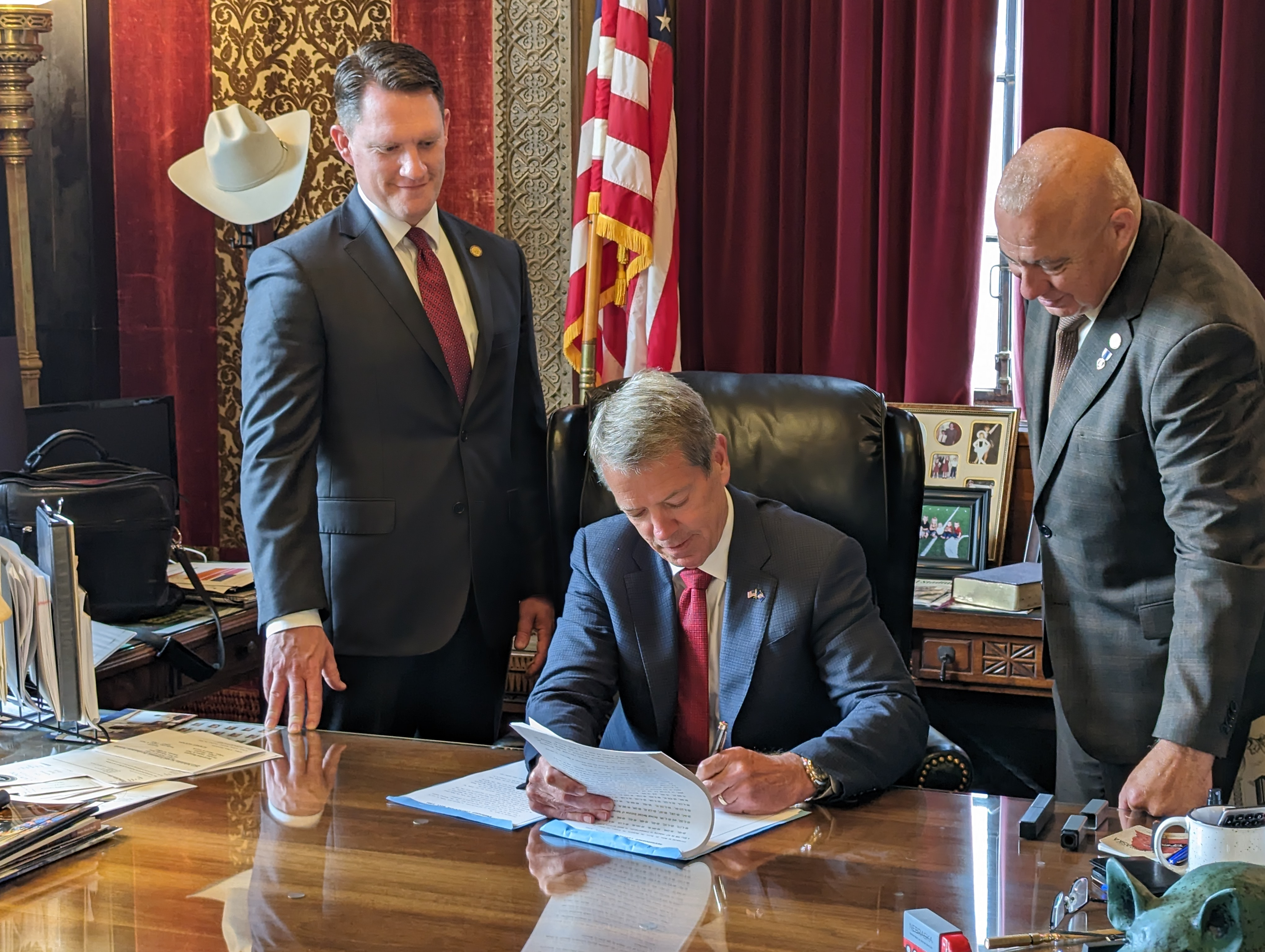
Governor Jim Pillen signs Legislative Bill 514 in his office, implementing photographic voter identification in Nebraska, as Senators Ben Hansen and Tom Brewer look on

Since 2007, Hansen has owned Hansen Chiropractic Wellness Center. He also founded Blair Rent-It Center in 2014 and the Heritage Barnwood Company. He was elected to the Nebraska Legislature in November 2018 and assumed office on January 9, 2019. Hansen is also chair of the Business and Labor Committee.

== Electoral history ==
Nebraska's 16th Legislative District Election, 2022
Primary election
Party	Candidate	Votes	%
Republican	Ben Hansen (incumbent)	6,470	73.98
Republican	Connie Petersen	2,276	26.02
Total votes		8,746	100.00
General election
Republican	Ben Hansen (incumbent)	9,744	70.27
Republican	Connie Petersen	4,123	29.73
Total votes		13,867	100.00
Republican hold			

Nebraska Legislature
Preceded by Ray Aguilar	Chair of the Executive Board of the Nebraska Legislature; 2025–present	Incumbent
