= Jana Hughes =

American politician

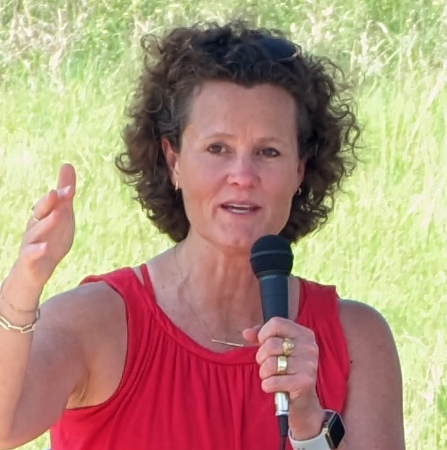

Member of the Nebraska Legislature from the 24th district
- Incumbent
- Assumed office January 4, 2023
- Preceded by: Mark Kolterman

Personal details
- Born: August 7, 1971 (age 55) Friend, Nebraska
- Party: Republican
- Spouse: John Hughes
- Children: 3
- Education: Texas A&M University (BS)
- Occupation: Engineer, teacher
- Website: Campaign

Jana Hughes (née Luebbe; born August 7, 1971) is a member of the Nebraska Legislature for District 24 from Seward, Nebraska. She was elected to the Nebraska Legislature on November 8, 2022. Hughes was elected to the Seward School Board in 2018.

== Electoral history ==
Nebraska's 24th Legislative District Election, 2022
Primary election
Party	Candidate	Votes	%
Republican	Patrick Hotovy	4,558	50.4
Republican	Jana Hughes	4,516	49.6
Total votes		9,104	100.0
General election
Republican	Jana Hughes	7,551	55.08
Republican	Patrick Hotovy	6,159	44.92
Total votes		13,710	100.00
Republican hold			
