= Dunixi Guereca =

Nebraskan state senator

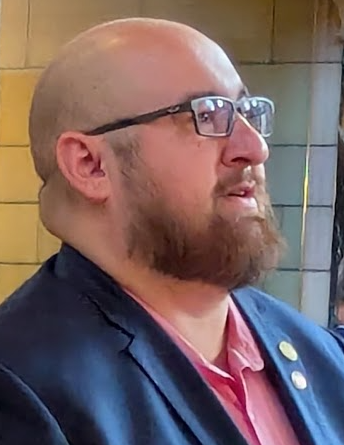

Member of the Nebraska Legislature from the 7th district
- Incumbent
- Assumed office January 8, 2025
- Preceded by: Tony Vargas

Personal details
- Born: October 1, 1988 (age 38) Torrance, California
- Party: Democratic

Dunixi Guereca (born October 1, 1988) is an American politician from Torrance, California, who has served in the Nebraska Legislature representing the 7th district since 2025.

Guereca is the son of Mexican immigrants and a public school advocate.
