= George Dungan III =

American politician

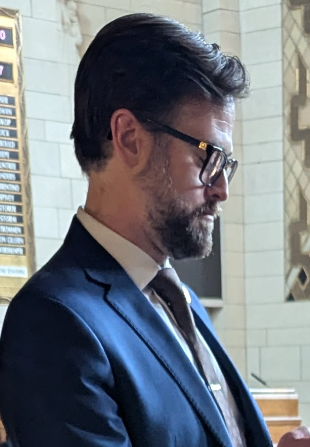

Member of the Nebraska Legislature from the 26th district
- Incumbent
- Assumed office January 4, 2023
- Preceded by: Matt Hansen

Personal details
- Born: 1988 (age 37–38) Lincoln, Nebraska, U.S.
- Party: Democratic
- Education: University of Kansas; American University Washington College of Law
- Website: GeorgeforNebraska.com

George Dungan III is a member of the state legislature in the U.S. state of Nebraska and a public defender.

Dungan was elected to represent Nebraska's 26th district in 2022, prevailing over opponent Russ Barger. The election was marked by an incident in which an attack ad created by a pro-Barger political action committee used a photograph of another man, Dustin Rymph, misidentified as Dungan.

== Electoral history ==
Nebraska's 26th Legislative District Election, 2022
Primary election
Party	Candidate	Votes	%
Republican	Russ Barger	2,833	40.99
Democratic	George Dungan III	2,543	36.79
Nonpartisan	Larry Weixelman	816	11.81
Nonpartisan	Bob Van Valkenburg	720	10.42
Total votes		6,912	100.00
General election
Democratic	George Dungan III	5,960	50.96
Republican	Russ Barger	5,736	49.04
Total votes		11,696	100.00
Democratic hold			
