= Loren Lippincott =

American politician

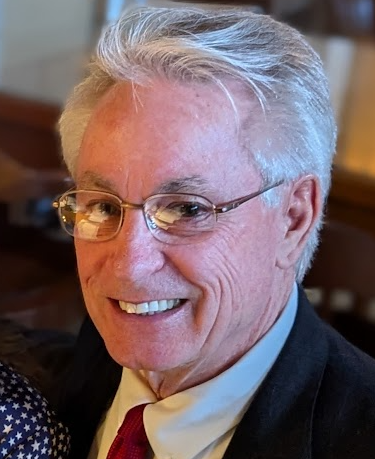

Member of the Nebraska Legislature from the 34th district
- Incumbent
- Assumed office January 4, 2023
- Preceded by: Curt Friesen

Personal details
- Born: March 20, 1955 (age 71) Central City, Nebraska, United States
- Party: Republican
- Education: University of Nebraska–Lincoln

Loren Lippincott is a member of the Nebraska Legislature for District 34 from Central City, Nebraska. He was elected to the Nebraska Legislature on November 8, 2022.

== Electoral history ==
Nebraska's 34th legislative district election, 2022
Primary election
Party	Candidate	Votes	%
Republican	Loren Lippincott	6,385	69.67
Republican	Michael Reimers	2,780	30.33
Total votes		9,165	100.00
General election
Republican	Loren Lippincott	8,788	67.67
Republican	Michael Reimers	4,199	32.33
Total votes		12,987	100.00
Republican hold			
