= John Arch (politician) =

American politician (born 1964)

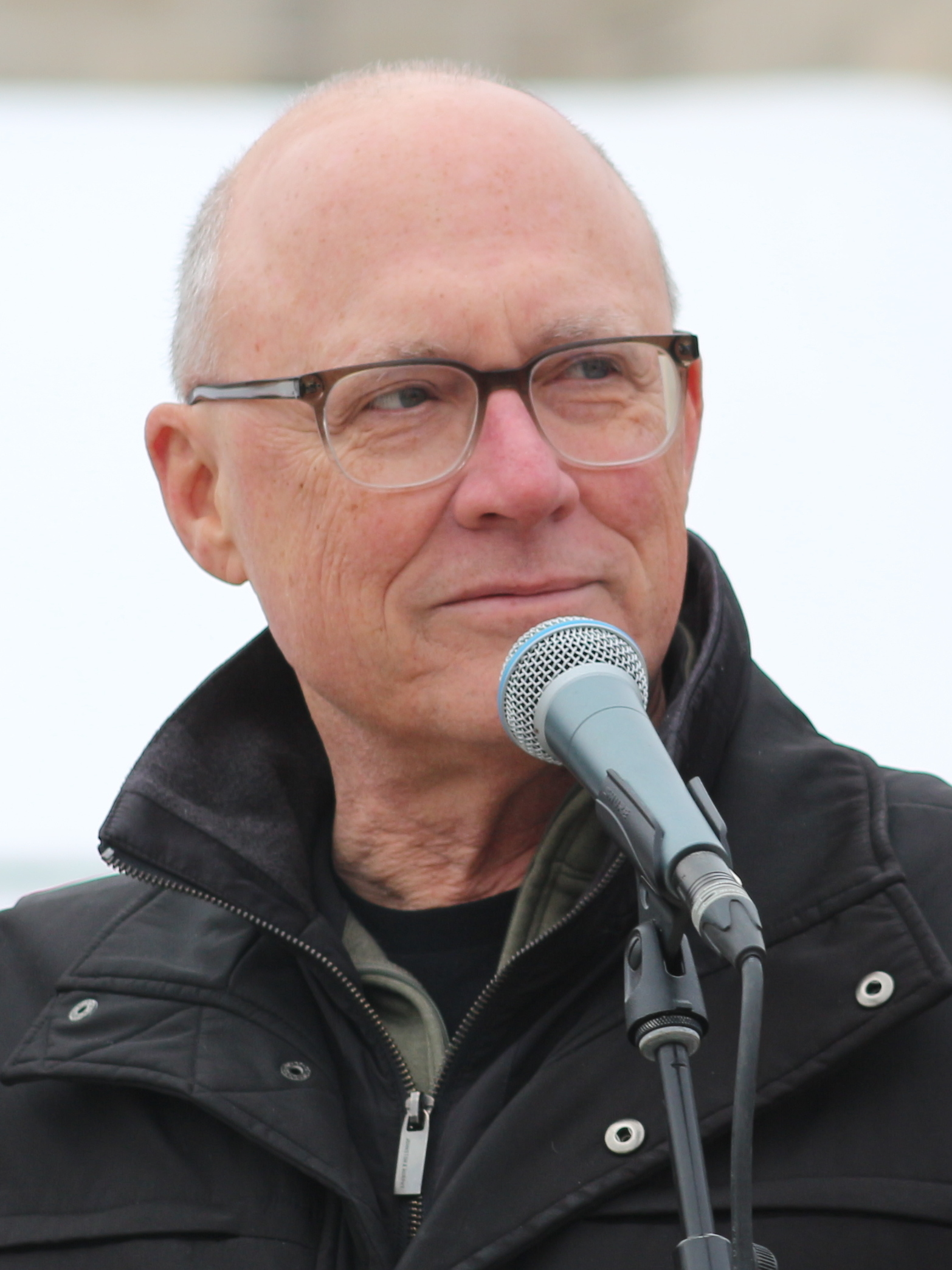

Speaker of the Nebraska Legislature
- Incumbent
- Assumed office January 4, 2023
- Preceded by: Mike Hilgers
- Succeeded by: to be elected

Member of the Nebraska Legislature from the 14th district
- Incumbent
- Assumed office January 9, 2019
- Preceded by: Jim Smith
- Succeeded by: Bill Bowes (elect)

Personal details
- Born: October 6, 1955 (age 71) Sioux City, Iowa, U.S.
- Party: Republican
- Spouse: Brenda Mengel (m. 1978)
- Children: 2
- Education: Grace University (BA); Western Seminary (MA); University of Nebraska, Omaha (MBA)

John K. Arch (born October 6, 1955) is an American politician in the U.S. state of Nebraska who has served in the Nebraska Legislature from the 14th district since 2019. Due to term limits, his last official day as senator will be January 7, 2027 and he will be eligible for re-election in 2030.

He was elected to the Legislature in 2018 to represent Nebraska's 14th legislative district and re-elected in 2022.

== Personal life ==
Arch holds a Bachelors of Arts degree in History/Philosophy from the now defunct Christian college Grace University. He then obtained a Master of Arts in Clinical/Counseling Psychology from Western Conservative Baptist Seminary (now Western Seminary) located in Portland, Oregon. His final degree was obtained from the University of Nebraska Omaha, a Master of Business Administration.

Arch started his thirty-plus year career in the healthcare industry working in marketing and business development at Saint Joseph Center for Mental Health in Omaha, Nebraska. He eventually moved on to be the Executive Vice President of Health Care and Director of the National Research Hospital and Clinics at Boys Town Medical.

Arch has been married for over four decades to his wife, Brenda. They have two sons and have lived in the Omaha Metro area since the 1990s.

Arch is very active in community involvement and has served on multiple boards. Currently, he serves as a board member on several organizations such as Prairie Health Ventures and Nebraska Purchasing Group Board Member. He is also a member of Overland Hills Baptist Church and Grace Life Bible Church where he is also a board member and teacher.

== Electoral history ==
Nebraska's 14th Legislative District Election, 2022
Primary election
Party	Candidate	Votes	%
Republican	John Arch (incumbent)	3,269	57.81
Democratic	Cori Villegas	1,431	25.30
Democratic	Rob Plugge	955	16.89
Total votes		5,655	100.00
General election
Republican	John Arch (incumbent)	7,606	62.70
Democratic	Cori Villegas	4,524	37.30
Total votes		12,130	100.00
Republican hold			

Nebraska's 14th Legislative District Election, 2018
Primary election
Party	Candidate	Votes	%
Republican	John Arch	3,462	60.02
Democratic	Jeff Parris	2,306	39.98
Total votes		5,768	100.00
General election
Republican	John Arch	7,625	55.82
Democratic	Jeff Parris	6,035	44.18
Total votes		13,660	100.00
Republican hold			

== Nebraska State Legislature ==
Arch is the speaker of the Unicameral. He also serves on the Reference Committee, Rules Committee, Executive Board, Legislative Oversight Committee, the Legislature's Planning Committee, and Statewide Tourism And Recreational Water Access and Resource Sustainability Special Committee (created by Legislative Bill 406).

Before assuming the role of Speaker, he had served on three committees: Health and Human Services, Urban Affairs, and General Affairs, and he was elected chair of the HHS Committee for the 107th Nebraska Legislature (2021–2022). He was an at-large member of the Nebraska Economic Development Task Force and served as chairman of the Youth Rehabilitation Treatment Center Special Oversight Committee.

Arch semi-regularly keeps a senator's blog during active sessions on the Nebraska Legislature website. As he is currently Speaker for the Unicameral, Arch updates the Nebraska Legislature webpage for the Speaker, which generally consist of anything procedural going on in the Unicameral.

District 14 of Nebraska's Legislative District includes the north-central portion of Sarpy County, including the cities of La Vista, Nebraska and Papillion, Nebraska.

== Political Views ==
=== Abortion Rights ===
Arch is pro-life and against abortion.

=== Gun Rights ===
Arch supports the Second Amendment.

=== Education ===
Arch believes in restricting sex education standards in Nebraska public education. He is also against Critical Race Theory being taught in schools. Arch introduced Legislative Bill 296 (LB 296), Require the State Department of Education to create a centralized education records system and employ registrars relating to students under the jurisdiction of the juvenile court and change provisions relating to graduation requirements and the State Department of Education Improvement Grant Fund, in 2025.

The bill, which passed in the Unicameral, creates a centralized education records system that will benefit those in juvenile court and detention. This centralized system makes sure that students can continue their education from where they left off before going through juvenile court.

=== Taxes ===
Arch supported getting rid of taxes on military retirement pay as proposed in the 2019 Legislative Bill 387. The bill did pass in the Unicameral.

=== COVID ===
Per Arch's website, he “opposed government shut-downs and COVID-19 mandates to help keep Sarpy County open for business.”

Political offices
Preceded by Mike Hilgers	Speaker of the Nebraska Legislature; 2023–present	Incumbent
