= Wendy DeBoer =

American politician

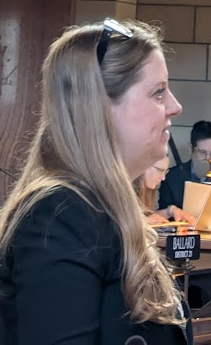

Member of the Nebraska Legislature from the 10th district
- Incumbent
- Assumed office January 9, 2019
- Preceded by: Bob Krist
- Succeeded by: Cindy Johnson (elect)

Personal details
- Born: May 16, 1974 (age 52) Omaha, Nebraska, U.S.
- Party: Democratic
- Education: Hastings College (BA); University of Nebraska, Lincoln (JD); University of Nebraska, Omaha (MA); Lutheran School of Theology (ThM); Syracuse University (MPhil, PhD)

Wendy DeBoer (born May 16, 1974) is a member of the Nebraska Legislature from the 10th district. She was elected to the Nebraska Legislature's 10th district after Bob Krist announced that he would run for Governor of Nebraska.

== Personal life ==
DeBoer was born on May 16, 1974, in Omaha, Nebraska and graduated from Burke High School. DeBoer Graduated from Burke High School in 1992. She had attended Hastings College and graduated in 1996, (with B.A. in economics and English) went to the University of Nebraska College of Law (J.D.) and graduated in 1999, attended University of Nebraska Omaha (M.A. in English literature) and graduated in 2003, attended Lutheran School of Theology at Chicago (M.A. in theology) and graduated in 2008, and attended the Syracuse University (MPhil in religious studies) and graduated in 2015.

As of 2025, DeBoer had her occupation listed as an educator and formerly was employed as a lawyer. She is also a member of the Holy Cross Lutheran Church.

== Nebraska Public Service Commission ==
As of August 2025, DeBoer announced she will be running for the Nebraska Public Service Commission as she will be completing her term as senator.

== Nebraska State Legislature ==
DeBoer was elected to the Nebraska Legislature's 10th district after Bob Krist announced that he would run for Governor of Nebraska. She defeated Matt Deaver in both the Primary and General election.

In November 2022, DeBoer was on the Select Interim Ethics Committee that was reviewing a case with former Nebraska Senator Mike Groene after he was found with objectifying photos of a female staffer.

As of 2025, DeBoer serves as the Vice Chair of the Judiciary Committee as well as being a member of the Transportation and Telecommunications Committee. She also servers of the Rules Committee, Legislature’s Planning Committee, and Nebraska Information Technology Commission.

District 10 of Nebraska's Legislative District includes north Omaha and a small section of Douglas County.

DeBoer has a political website at deboerfornebraska.com.

=== LGBTQA+ ===
DeBoer voted against Legislative Bill 574, Limits to Abortion Access and Prohibition of Gender Affirming Care for Minors.

=== Abortion Rights ===
DeBoer has voted in favor of abortion rights for patients by voting against Legislative Bill 632, Requires Abortion Providers to Dispose of Fetal and Embryonic Remains by Burial or Cremation. DeBoer has abstained from voting on several abortion bills in 2019 and 2020

=== Taxes ===
DeBoer introduced Legislative Bill 1128, Adopt the Student Loan Repayment Assistance for Teachers Act to help Nebraska Teachers with student loans. The bill would have provided tax deductions, with a goal of keeping teachers in the state while bringing in more, but did not pass in the Unicameral.

=== Infrastructure ===
DeBoer introduced Legislative Bill (LB) 1256, Require reports by communications service providers regarding 911 service outages and require a hearing, which would review and set time frames if there was a large 911 service outage. The provisions of this bill were amended into LB 1031, which passed.

In 2025, DeBoer introduced Legislative Bill 600, Change provisions relating to the Nebraska Rules of the Road and the Automatic License Plate Reader Privacy Act, which would give the Nebraska Department of Transportation the power to set up speed-detecting systems like sensors and radar.

== Electoral history ==
Nebraska's 10th Legislative District Election, 2022
Primary election
Party	Candidate	Votes	%
Democratic	Wendy DeBoer (incumbent)	4,176	53.48
Republican	Lou Ann Goding	3,632	46.52
Total votes		7,808	100.00
General election
Democratic	Wendy DeBoer	7,120	53.47
Republican	Lou Ann Goding	6,197	46.53
Total votes		13,317	100.00
Democratic hold			

General election for Nebraska State Senate District 10
Party	Candidate	Votes	%	±%
Nonpartisan	Wendy DeBoer	8,306	50.3%	
Nonpartisan	Matt Deaver	8,201	49.7%	

Primary election for Nebraska State Senate District 10
Party	Candidate	Votes	%	±%
Nonpartisan	Wendy DeBoer	3,253	57.3%	
Nonpartisan	Matt Deaver	2,423	42.7%	
