= Teresa Ibach =

American politician

Teresa J. Ibach

Member of the Nebraska Legislature from the 44th district
- Incumbent
- Assumed office January 4, 2023
- Preceded by: Dan Hughes

Personal details
- Born: December 7, 1961 (age 64) Lincoln, Nebraska, U.S.
- Party: Republican
- Spouse: Greg Ibach
- Education: University of Nebraska–Lincoln
- Occupation: Marketing and business administration
- Website: Campaign

Teresa J. Ibach (née Heusman) is a member of the Nebraska Legislature for District 44 from Sumner, Nebraska. She was elected to the Nebraska Legislature on November 8, 2022.

== Electoral history ==
Nebraska's 44th legislative district election, 2022
Primary election
Party	Candidate	Votes	%
Republican	Teresa Ibach	6,554	76.13
Republican	Ed Dunn	2,055	23.87
Total votes		8,609	100.00
General election
Republican	Teresa Ibach	9,708	100
Republican	Ed Dunn (withdrew)	0	0
Total votes		9,708	100.00
Republican hold			
