= Brad von Gillern =

American politician

R. Brad von Gillern
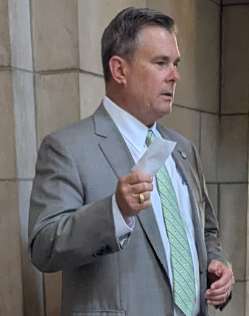

Member of the Nebraska Legislature from the 4th district
- Incumbent
- Assumed office January 4, 2023
- Preceded by: Robert Hilkemann

Personal details
- Born: July 13, 1960 (age 66) Lincoln, Nebraska
- Party: Republican
- Spouse: Mary von Gillern
- Children: 4
- Education: University of Nebraska–Lincoln (BS)
- Occupation: Building Contractor
- Profession: Construction Management
- Website: Campaign

R. Brad von Gillern (born July 13, 1960) is a member of the Nebraska Legislature for District 4 from Elkhorn, Nebraska. He was elected to the Nebraska Legislature on November 8, 2022.

== Personal life ==
Von Gillern was born in Lincoln, Nebraska in July 1960 and graduated from Burke High School in Omaha, Nebraska in 1978. He would go on to receive a Bachelors in Construction Management from the University of Nebraska–Lincoln in 1983.

In December 1981, von Gillern married his wife, Mary, with whom he has four children.

Von Gillern was named President of Lueder Construction in Omaha, Nebraska, in 2000 and acquired majority ownership of Lueder Construction in 2006. He served as president and then CEO until 2021, when he sold his remaining interest in the business.

Von Gillern is a current board member and Chair for the Boy Scouts of America, Mid American Council. He is a former board member of several organizations including Lifegate Church, Salvation Army, Omaha Leaders, and the University of Nebraska Medical Center.

== Nebraska State Legislature ==
As of 2026, von Gillern serves as the Chair on the Revenue Committee and as a member on the Banking, Commerce and Insurance Committee. He is also a member of Statewide Tourism And Recreational Water Access and Resource Sustainability (LB406).

Von Gillern serves District 4 of Nebraska's Legislative District which includes the western portion of Omaha in Douglas County.

=== Abortion ===
Von Gillern describes himself as pro-life.

=== Veterans' affairs ===
In 2025, von Gillern introduced Legislative Bill 209 to alleviate property taxes for veterans by allowing qualification for the Homestead Exemption. The bill did pass into law.

=== Infrastructure ===
In 2025, von Gillern introduced Legislative Bill 558 to create an Infrastructure Review Task Force for the state highway system. The bill would ensure a review every year of the Nebraska highway system and was passed into law the same year.

=== Economy and taxes ===
Von Gillern has introduced multiple legislative bills in relation to taxes and the Nebraska economy including LB 707, which raised the sales tax rate for the Good Life Transformational Projects Act and the Good Life District Economic Development Act and detailed further parameters of what kind businesses fall under the jurisdiction of the Acts. The bill passed in 2025.

In 2025, von Gillern also introduced Legislative Bill 650, with the hope of shrinking Nebraska’s budget shortfall of $51 million. The goal of the bill is to cut incentive programs that would impact the few businesses, organizations, and people. The bill passed in 2025.

In 2026, von Gillern introduced Legislative Bill 1165 on behalf of Governor Jim Pillen. The bill, referred to as The Union Pacific Merger Bill and Grow the Good Life Act, would make “a new grant program that aims to help employers retain and attract employees.” The bill would also offer tax incentives for businesses operating in Nebraska, benefiting mainstays like Union Pacific Railroad which is headquartered in Omaha, Nebraska.

=== Transportation ===
In 2025, von Gillern introduced Legislative Bill 279, which would require Nebraska vehicles to have only a back license plate, instead of requiring a back and front plate. The bill was amended in Legislative Bill 97 and passed.

== Electoral history ==
Nebraska's 4th Legislative District Election, 2022
Primary election
Party	Candidate	Votes	%
Republican	R. Brad von Gillern	5,055	52.09
Nonpartisan	Cindy Maxwell-Ostdiek	4,649	47.91
Total votes		9,704	100.00
General election
Republican	R. Brad von Gillern	8,710	52.41
Nonpartisan	Cindy Maxwell-Ostdiek	7,908	47.59
Total votes		16,618	100.00
Republican hold			
