= Sumner, Nebraska =

- Village
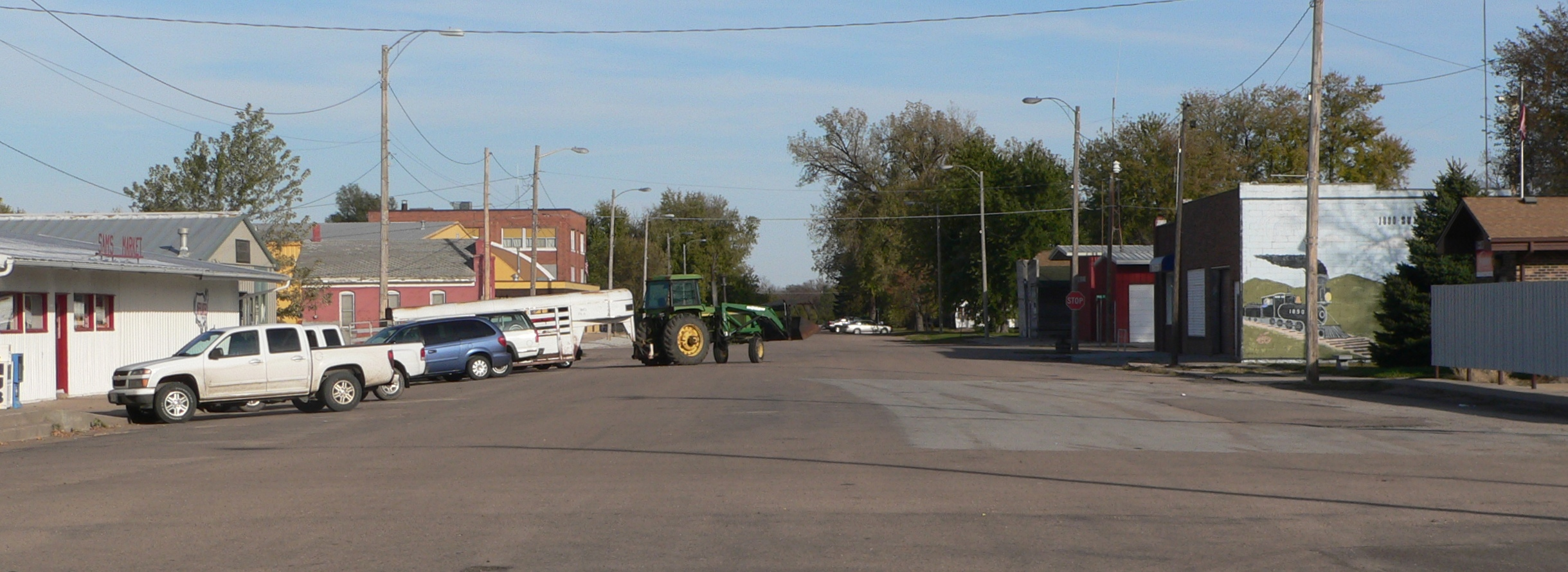
- Downtown Sumner

- Location of Sumner, Nebraska
- Coordinates: 40°56′56″N 99°30′29″W
- Country: United States
- State: Nebraska
- County: Dawson

Area
  - Total: 0.29 sq mi (0.76 km^{2})
  - Land: 0.29 sq mi (0.76 km^{2})
  - Water: 0 sq mi (0.00 km^{2})
- Elevation: 2,369 ft (722 m)

Population (2020)
  - Total: 252
  - Density: 853.6/sq mi (329.58/km^{2})
- Time zone: UTC-6 (Central (CST))
  - Summer (DST): UTC-5 (CDT)
- ZIP code: 68878
- Area code: 308
- FIPS code: 31-47675
- GNIS feature ID: 2399932

Sumner is a village in Dawson County, Nebraska, United States. It is part of the Lexington, Nebraska Micropolitan Statistical Area. As of the 2020 census, Sumner had a population of 252.

== History ==
Sumner was established in 1890 when the Omaha and Republican Valley Railway was extended to that point. It was named for Charles Sumner, a senator from Massachusetts known for his abolitionist views.

== Geography ==
According to the United States Census Bureau, the village has a total area of 0.30 square miles (0.78 km^{2}), all land.

== Demographics ==
Historical population
| Census | Pop. | Note | %± |
|---|---|---|---|
| 1900 | 210 | | — |
| 1910 | 321 | | 52.9% |
| 1920 | 345 | | 7.5% |
| 1930 | 297 | | −13.9% |
| 1940 | 296 | | −0.3% |
| 1950 | 267 | | −9.8% |
| 1960 | 254 | | −4.9% |
| 1970 | 222 | | −12.6% |
| 1980 | 254 | | 14.4% |
| 1990 | 210 | | −17.3% |
| 2000 | 237 | | 12.9% |
| 2010 | 236 | | −0.4% |
| 2020 | 252 | | 6.8% |
U.S. Decennial Census

=== 2010 census ===
As of the census of 2010, there were 236 people, 97 households, and 62 families residing in the village. The population density was 786.7 inhabitants per square mile (303.7/km^{2}). There were 113 housing units at an average density of 376.7 per square mile (145.4/km^{2}). The racial makeup of the village was 94.1% White, 0.4% Asian, 3.0% from other races, and 2.5% from two or more races. Hispanic or Latino of any race were 4.7% of the population.

There were 97 households, of which 30.9% had children under the age of 18 living with them, 52.6% were married couples living together, 8.2% had a female householder with no husband present, 3.1% had a male householder with no wife present, and 36.1% were non-families. 30.9% of all households were made up of individuals, and 7.2% had someone living alone who was 65 years of age or older. The average household size was 2.43 and the average family size was 3.08.

The median age in the village was 37 years. 30.5% of residents were under the age of 18; 3% were between the ages of 18 and 24; 26.8% were from 25 to 44; 23.7% were from 45 to 64; and 16.1% were 65 years of age or older. The gender makeup of the village was 47.9% male and 52.1% female.

=== 2000 census ===
As of the census of 2000, there were 237 people, 102 households, and 60 families residing in the village. The population density was 817.0 inhabitants per square mile (315.4/km^{2}). There were 117 housing units at an average density of 403.3 per square mile (155.7/km^{2}). The racial makeup of the village was 94.94% White, 1.27% Native American, 3.38% from other races, and 0.42% from two or more races. Hispanic or Latino of any race were 9.70% of the population.

There were 102 households, out of which 29.4% had children under the age of 18 living with them, 51.0% were married couples living together, 5.9% had a female householder with no husband present, and 40.2% were non-families. 35.3% of all households were made up of individuals, and 22.5% had someone living alone who was 65 years of age or older. The average household size was 2.32 and the average family size was 3.05.

In the village, the population was spread out, with 27.0% under the age of 18, 7.6% from 18 to 24, 24.5% from 25 to 44, 20.7% from 45 to 64, and 20.3% who were 65 years of age or older. The median age was 35 years. For every 100 females, there were 106.1 males. For every 100 females age 18 and over, there were 103.5 males.

As of 2000 the median income for a household in the village was $27,143, and the median income for a family was $33,750. Males had a median income of $25,385 versus $18,125 for females. The per capita income for the village was $14,469. About 8.5% of families and 11.2% of the population were below the poverty line, including 15.3% of those under the age of eighteen and none of those 65 or over.

== Education ==
It is in the Sumner-Eddyville-Miller Schools school district.
