= John Fredrickson =

American politician

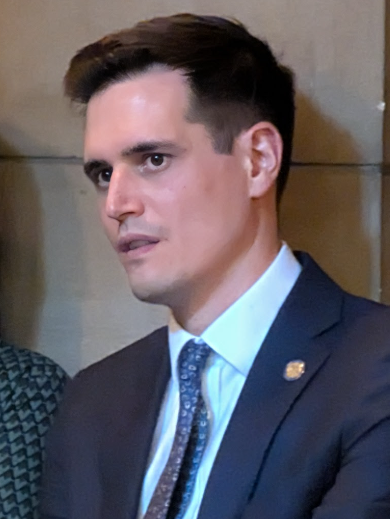

Member of the Nebraska Legislature from the 20th district
- Incumbent
- Assumed office January 4, 2023
- Preceded by: John S. McCollister

Personal details
- Born: March 28, 1987 (age 39) Des Moines, Iowa
- Party: Democratic
- Spouse: Jeff Formanek
- Education: New York University (BA); Columbia University (MSW)
- Website: Campaign website

John A. Fredrickson (born March 28, 1987) is a member of the Nebraska Legislature for District 20 from Omaha, Nebraska. He was elected to the Nebraska Legislature on November 8, 2022, by a margin of only 82 votes. He is the first openly gay man to be elected to the state legislature.

== Electoral history ==
Nebraska's 20th Legislative District Election, 2022
Primary election
Party	Candidate	Votes	%
Republican	Stu Dornan	4,431	42.60
Democratic	John Fredrickson	3,686	35.44
Republican	Julie Fredrickson	2,284	21.96
Total votes		10,401	100.00
General election
Democratic	John Fredrickson	8,139	50.25
Republican	Stu Dornan	8,057	49.75
Total votes		16,196	100.00
Democratic gain from Republican			
