= Nebraska Legislature =

Legislative branch of the state government of Nebraska

Type
- Type: Unicameral
- Term limits: 2 consecutive terms

Leadership
- President: Joe Kelly (R) since January 5, 2023
- Speaker: John Arch (R) since January 4, 2023
- Executive Board Chair: Ben Hansen (R) since January 8, 2025
- Executive Board Vice Chair: Teresa Ibach (R) since January 8, 2025

Structure
- Seats: 49
- Legislature political groups: Officially nonpartisan Majority (33): Republican (33); Minority (16): Democratic (15); Independent Democrat (1)
- Length of term: 4 years
- Authority: Article III, Nebraska Constitution
- Salary: $12,000/year + per diem

Elections
- Legislature voting system: Top-two primary
- Last Legislature election: November 5, 2024 (25 seats)
- Next Legislature election: November 3, 2026 (24 seats)
- Redistricting: Legislative control

Meeting place
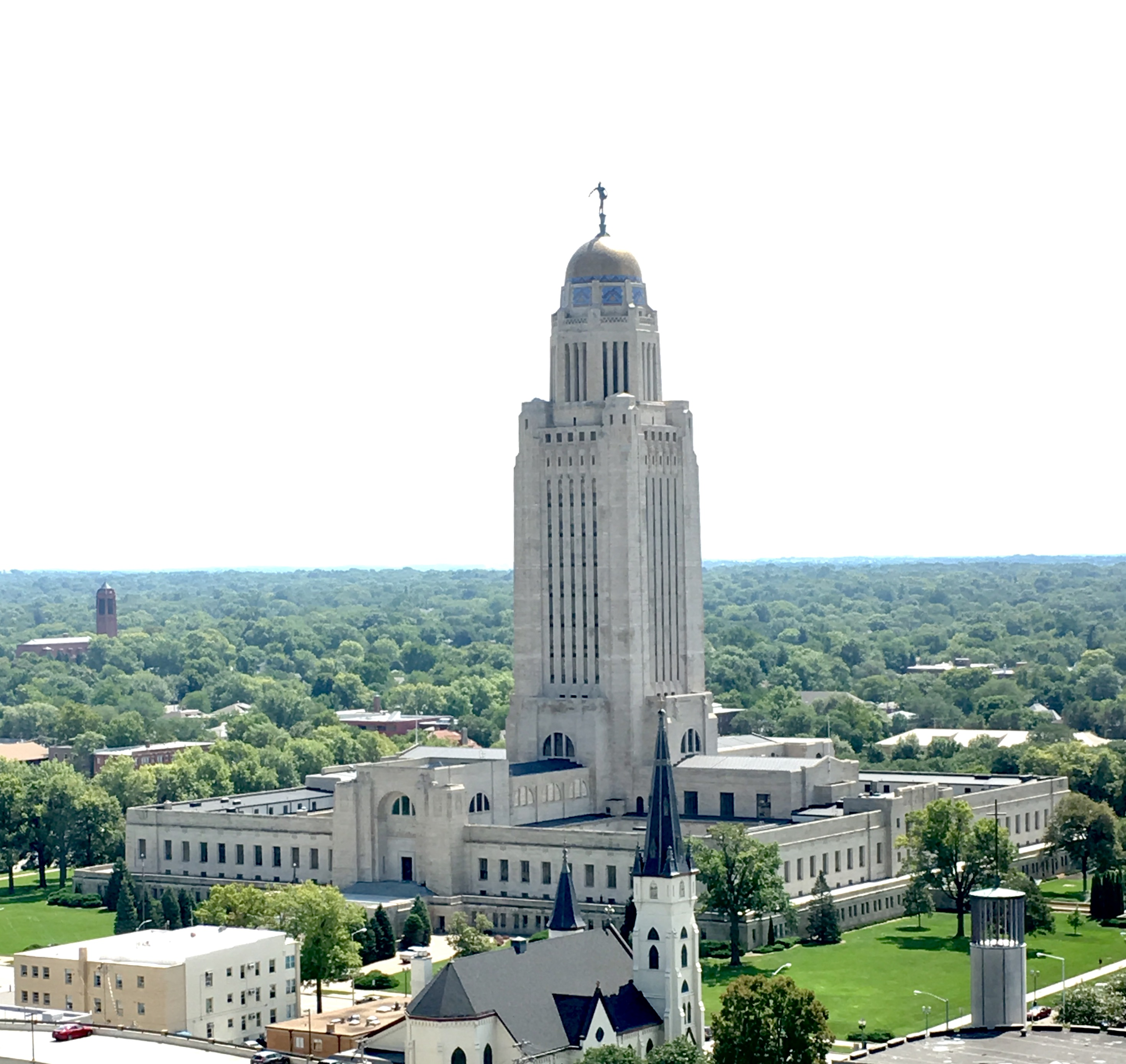
- Nebraska State Capitol; Lincoln

Website
- www.nebraskalegislature.gov

The Nebraska Legislature (also called the Unicameral) is the legislature of the U.S. state of Nebraska. The legislature meets at the Nebraska State Capitol in Lincoln. With 49 members, known as "senators", the Nebraska Legislature is the smallest U.S. state legislature. A total of 25 members is required for a majority; however, in order to overcome a filibuster, a two-thirds vote of all members is required, which takes 33 votes.

Unlike the legislatures of the other 49 U.S. states and the U.S. Congress, the Nebraska Legislature is unicameral, a structure the state adopted in 1937. It is also nonpartisan in that members are elected in nonpartisan elections, and the Legislature does not officially recognize its members' political party affiliation or maintain a formal partisan leadership structure. All 49 members elect, by secret ballot, the Legislature's officers (except the lieutenant governor, who serves as President of the Legislature) and committee chairs with the aim of ensuring lawmakers select leaders they truly support without undue pressure or influence from other branches of government, the political parties, or other sources of outside influence.

== History ==
The First Nebraska Territorial Legislature met in Omaha in 1855, staying there until statehood was granted in 1867. Nebraska originally operated under a bicameral legislature, but over time dissatisfaction with the bicameral system grew. Bills were lost because the two houses could not agree on a single version. Conference committees that formed to merge the two bills coming out of each chamber often met in secret, and thus were unaccountable for their actions. Campaigns to consolidate the Nebraska Legislature into a single chamber date back as early as 1913, meeting with mixed success.

After a trip to Australia in 1931, George W. Norris, then U.S. senator for Nebraska, campaigned for reform, arguing that the bicameral system was based on the non-democratic British House of Lords, and that it was pointless to have two bodies of people doing the same thing and hence wasting money. He specifically pointed to the example of the Australian state of Queensland, which had adopted a unicameral parliament nearly ten years before. In 1934, voters approved a constitutional amendment to take effect with the 1936 elections, abolishing the Nebraska Senate and the Nebraska House of Representatives and granting their powers to a new unicameral body simply called the Nebraska Legislature. At 43 members, the new Nebraska Legislature was closer in size to the old 33-member Nebraska Senate than it was to the old 100-member Nebraska House of Representatives.

Results by county of the 1934 unicameral legislature referendum Yes: 70–80%; 60–70%; 50–60%; No: 50–60%

Many possible reasons for the 1934 amendment's victory have been advanced: the popularity of George Norris; the Depression-era desire to cut costs; public dissatisfaction with the previous year's legislature; or even the fact that, by chance, it was on the ballot in the same year as an amendment to legalize parimutuel betting on horse races. This final coincidence may have aided the measure's passage in Omaha, where the unicameral issue was not a pressing one but horse racing was. (Gambling interests campaigned for "yes" votes on all amendments in hopes of assuring the horse-racing amendment's passage.)

The new unicameral Legislature met for the first time in 1937. Though the name of the body is formally the "Nebraska Legislature", during the first session the Legislature adopted a resolution formally giving members the title of "senator". In Nebraska, the Legislature is also often known as "the Unicameral."

== General powers ==
The Legislature is responsible for law-making and appropriating funds for the state. The governor has the power to veto any bill, but the Legislature may override the governor's veto by a vote of three-fifths (30) of its members. The Legislature also has the power, by a three-fifths vote, to propose a constitutional amendment to the voters, who then pass or reject it through a referendum.

== Selection, composition and operation ==
The Legislature is composed of 49 members, chosen by a single-member district or constituency. Senators are chosen for four-year terms, with one-half of the seats up for election every second year. In effect, this results in half the chamber being elected at the same time as the President of the United States, and the other half elected at the same time as other statewide elections. Senators must be qualified voters who are at least 21 years old and have lived in the district they wish to represent for at least one year. A constitutional amendment passed in 2000 limits senators to two consecutive terms. However, a former senator is re-eligible for election after four years. Senators receive $12,000 a year + per diem.

Rather than separate primary elections held to choose Republican, Democratic, and other partisan contenders for a seat, Nebraska uses a single nonpartisan blanket primary, in which the top two vote-getters are entitled to run in the general election. There are no formal party alignments or groups within the Legislature. Coalitions tend to form issue by issue based on a member's philosophy of government, geographic background, and constituency. However, almost all the members of the legislature are known to be either Democrats or Republicans, and the state branches of both parties explicitly endorse candidates for legislative seats.

=== Vacancies ===
Vacancies in the Legislature are filled by the governor.

=== Length of session ===
Nebraska has a legislative session every year, but is set up with a biennium system. Regular sessions of the Nebraska Legislature last for a maximum 90 working days in odd-numbered years and short sessions last 60 working days in even-numbered years.

Both sessions start after the first Monday in January with regular sessions lasting until sometime in mid-June and short sessions going until about mid-April.

With a biennium system set up, bills that do not make it to floor debate during a short session can carry over to the regular session and continue through the legislative process. Bills introduced in a regular session do not carry over.

=== Special sessions ===
Article IV-8 of the Nebraska State Constitution gives the governor the power to call special sessions on "extraordinary occasions." When called, lawmakers may only consider legislation outlined in the governor's proclamation.

== Membership ==
Affiliation	Party (Shading indicates majority caucus)			Total	Vacant
Affiliation	Republican	Independent	Democratic	Total	Vacant
Start of 109th Legislature	33	1	15	49	0
January 13, 2026	32	1	15	48	1
January 14, 2026	33	1	15	49	0
Latest voting share	67.3%	2%	30.6%		

The Nebraska Legislature officially recognizes no party affiliations; affiliations listed are based on state party endorsements. As of 2026, 33 members are Republicans, 15 are Democrats, and one is a registered Independent.

District	Name	Party	Residence	Start	Next Election
1	Robert Hallstrom	Republican	Syracuse	2025	2028
2	Robert Clements	Republican	Elmwood	2017	2026 (term limited)
3	Victor Rountree	Democratic	Bellevue	2025	2028
4	Brad von Gillern	Republican	Elkhorn	2023	2026
5	Margo Juarez	Democratic	Omaha	2025	2028
6	Machaela Cavanaugh	Democratic	Omaha	2019	2026 (term limited)
7	Dunixi Guereca	Democratic	Omaha	2025	2028
8	Megan Hunt	Independent (Note: Hunt was registered as a Democrat until 2023.)	Omaha	2019	2026 (term limited)
9	John Cavanaugh	Democratic	Omaha	2021	2028 (term limited)
10	Wendy DeBoer	Democratic	Bennington	2019	2026 (term limited)
11	Terrell McKinney	Democratic	Omaha	2021	2028 (term limited)
12	Merv Riepe	Republican	Ralston	2023 (Note: Riepe previously served from 2015–2019.)	2026
13	Ashlei Spivey	Democratic	Omaha	2025	2028
14	John Arch	Republican	LaVista	2019	2026 (term limited)
15	Dave Wordekemper	Republican	Fremont	2025	2028
16	Ben Hansen	Republican	Blair	2019	2026 (term limited)
17	Glen Meyer	Republican	Pender	2025	2028
18	Christy Armendariz	Republican	Omaha	2023	2026
19	Rob Dover	Republican	Norfolk	2022	2028
20	John Fredrickson	Democratic	Omaha	2023	2026
21	Beau Ballard	Republican	Lincoln	2023	2028
22	Mike Moser	Republican	Columbus	2019	2026 (term limited)
23	Jared Storm	Republican	David City	2025	2028
24	Jana Hughes	Republican	Seward	2023	2026
25	Carolyn Bosn	Republican	Lincoln	2023	2028
26	George Dungan III	Democratic	Lincoln	2023	2026
27	Jason Prokop	Democratic	Lincoln	2025	2028
28	Jane Raybould	Democratic	Lincoln	2023	2026
29	Eliot Bostar	Democratic	Lincoln	2021	2028 (term limited)
30	Myron Dorn	Republican	Adams	2019	2026 (term limited)
31	Kathleen Kauth	Republican	Omaha	2022	2028
32	Tom Brandt	Republican	Plymouth	2019	2026 (term limited)
33	Dan Lonowski	Republican	Hastings	2025	2028
34	Loren Lippincott	Republican	Central City	2023	2026
35	Dan Quick	Democratic	Grand Island	2025 (Note: Quick previously served from 2017–2021.)	2028
36	Rick Holdcroft	Republican	Bellevue	2023	2026
37	Stan Clouse	Republican	Kearney	2025	2028
38	Dave Murman	Republican	Glenvil	2019	2026 (term limited)
39	Tony Sorrentino	Republican	Elkhorn	2025	2028
40	Barry DeKay	Republican	Niobrara	2023	2026
41	Fred Meyer	Republican	St. Paul	2026 (Note: Appointed by Governor Jim Pillen; Meyer previously served from 2023–2025.)	2028
42	Mike Jacobson	Republican	North Platte	2022	2026
43	Tanya Storer	Republican	Whitman	2025	2028
44	Teresa Ibach	Republican	Sumner	2023	2026
45	Rita Sanders	Republican	Bellevue	2021	2028 (term limited)
46	Danielle Conrad	Democratic	Lincoln	2023 (Note: Conrad previously served from 2007–2015.)	2026
47	Paul Strommen	Republican	Sidney	2025	2028
48	Brian Hardin	Republican	Gering	2023	2026
49	Bob Andersen	Republican	Omaha	2025	2028

== Leadership ==
=== Lieutenant governor ===
The Lieutenant Governor is the President of the Legislature and the official presiding officer. When presiding, the Lieutenant Governor may vote to break a tie in the Legislature, but may not break a tie when the vote is on the final passage of a bill.

=== Speaker ===
The highest position among the members is the Speaker, who presides over the Legislature in the absence of the Lieutenant Governor. The current Speaker of the Nebraska Legislature is John Arch. The Speaker is elected by floor ballot (or secret ballot) for a two-year term. The Speaker, with the approval of the executive board, determines the agenda (or the order in which bills and resolutions are considered). The Speaker is not a member of any committee, but is an ex-officio member of the Rules Committee and the executive board.

=== Executive board ===
Administrative matters of the body are dealt with by the executive board. The Board includes the Speaker, a chairperson, a vice chairperson, and six other members. The chair and vice chair are chosen by floor ballot (or secret ballot) for two-year terms by the entire legislature. The chair of the Appropriations Committee serves, but cannot vote on any matter, and can only speak on fiscal matters.

The executive board is also the Referencing Committee. All bills introduced are referenced by the Referencing Committee to the committee whose subject relates to the bill. Any member of the Legislature may object to where a bill was referenced and attempt re-refer the bill to a different committee with a majority vote of the Legislature.

=== Caucuses ===
The Nebraska Legislature does not caucus based on political affiliation or use caucuses to organize support or opposition to legislation. Senators are classified into three geographically based caucuses based on the three congressional districts in the state. Each caucus elects two board members who serve on the executive board and four members who serve on the Committee on Committees.

== Legislative committees ==
Committee	Chair	Members	Rank (Note: The rank is according to the order of precedence of committees as listed in Nebraska Revised Statute 84-120 in the case of a vacancy in the office of the Governor of Nebraska.)
Standing committees
Agriculture	Barry DeKay	8 Members	10
Appropriations	Robert Clements	9 Members	5
Banking, Commerce and Insurance	Mike Jacobson	8 Members	8
Business and Labor	Kathleen Kauth	7 Members	14
Education	Dave Murman	8 Members	7
General Affairs	Rick Holdcroft	8 Members	12
Government, Military and Veterans Affairs	Rita Sanders	8 Members	4
Health and Human Services	Brian Hardin	7 Members	11
Judiciary	Carolyn Bosn	8 Members	3
Natural Resources	Tom Brandt	8 Members	9
Nebraska Retirement Systems	Beau Ballard	6 Members	-
Revenue	Brad von Gillern	8 Members	6
Transportation and Telecommunications	Mike Moser	8 Members	15
Urban Affairs	Terrell McKinney	7 Members	13
Select committees
Committee on Committees	Christy Armendariz	13 Members	2
Enrollment and Review	Dunixi Guereca	1 Member	-
Reference (Executive Board of the Legislative Council)	Ben Hansen	9 Members	1
Rules	Loren Lippincott	6 Members	-
Special committees
Executive Board of the Legislative Council (Reference)	Ben Hansen	9 Members	1
Building Maintenance	Jana Hughes	6 Members	-
Justice Reinvestment Oversight	Carolyn Bosn	5 Members	-
Legislative Performance Audit	None	7 Members	-
Planning	Wendy DeBoer	9 Members	-
State-Tribal Relations	Jane Raybould	7 Members	-
Statewide Tourism and Recreation, Water Access, and Resource Sustainability (STAR WARS)	John Arch	7 Members	-

=== Committee selection and election of chairs ===
At the beginning of each biennium, the Legislature elects a Committee on Committees of thirteen members, one at large who is elected by all members from the floor of the Legislature by floor ballot (or secret ballot). Four members are from Districts 2, 3, 15, 16, 19, 21–29, 45, and 46; four from Districts 4–14, 18, 20, 31, 36, 39 and 49; and four from Districts 1, 17, 30, 32–35, 37 and 38. Each caucus elects its own four members to serve on the Committee on Committees. The Committee on Committees creates a report of the membership of all committees for the Legislature. The Legislature may approve the report with a majority vote or reject it, but may not amend the report. If the report is rejected, the Committee on Committees must start over and create a new committee membership report until the Legislature can adopt one.

Committee chairs are elected on the first day of the 90-day session and serve until the end of the 60-day session. Committee chairs are elected directly by the entire membership of the Legislature. On the first day, those wishing to run for a committee chair give a brief speech as to why they believe they're qualified, and following the speeches for that committee, members use a ballot vote to choose who they wish to serve as committee chair.

==== History of committee chair elections ====
The first Unicameral allowed each committee to select its own committee chair in 1937; from 1939 to 1971 the Committee on Committees designated the committee chair; and from 1973 to present committee chairs are chosen by ballot. The Speaker, Committee on Committees chair, and the chair and vice chair of the executive board have been chosen by floor ballot since the Unicameral's first day in 1937.

== Legislative process ==
The Nebraska Unicameral Legislature operates as a single-house legislative system, distinct from the bicameral systems found in other U.S. states. Lawmaking in Nebraska is governed by a specific set of rules and procedures, as detailed in the official "Rules of the Nebraska Legislature" document. This section provides an overview of the legislative process in Nebraska, focusing on its various stages from bill introduction to enactment.

According to the rules of the Legislature, a two-thirds majority of elected members must vote for a cloture motion for a bill to overcome a filibuster. The Legislature does not allow cloture votes to end debate on proposals to change its rules.

=== Bill introduction and first reading ===
In the Nebraska Legislature, any senator can introduce a bill during the first 10 legislative days of a session. Once introduced, the bill is assigned a number and read for the first time. This first reading is generally a formality and does not involve debate. After the first reading, the bill is referred to a committee by the Executive Board acting as the Reference Committee for further review and discussion. Senators may object to the referencing of a bill if they disagree with which committee it was sent to.

=== Priority Bills ===
Priority bills are guaranteed priority scheduling for the legislative session the bill is introduced in. Senators can designate one bill as priority each session, committees can select up to two, and the Speaker can select up to twenty-five priority bills. Bills receive this designation because they are of great importance to the senator and their constituents or are very timely in relation to a state or national issue.

=== Committee review and public hearing ===
After a bill has been introduced, it is referred to one of fourteen standing committees for review. The committee reviews all the bills available to move forward and decides which get priority. Once a list of bills is created, the chair schedules a bill for a public hearing.

Every bill introduced is guaranteed a public hearing, providing an opportunity for the public, experts, and stakeholders to offer testimony in support, opposition, or in a neutral capacity.

At a time determined by the committee chair, the committee convenes in a private executive session—closed to the public but open to members of the media for transparency—to decide the bill's fate. The committee may choose to advance the bill to General File, either with or without amendments, hold it in committee, or indefinitely postpone it, effectively killing the bill. Additionally, the committee creates a committee statement that includes information about the bill and the individuals who testified during the public hearing.

Bills held in committee and left with a status of "Referral" at the end of a short session do have a chance to move forward in the next, regular, session.

=== General file ===
General File is the first time the full Legislature has the opportunity to debate and vote on bills. At this stage, senators consider amendments, which may be proposed by committees and by individual senators. Many people consider General File to be the most crucial stage of the legislative process because it is where most compromises are reached. It takes a majority vote of the Legislature (25 votes) to adopt amendments or move a bill from General File to the next stage of consideration.

At the end of short session, bills with the status of "General File" can carry over to the next year's session. Short sessions are on even-numbered years and last from January to mid-April and regular sessions are on odd-numbered years and last from January to mid-June.

=== Enrollment and review ===
Commonly referred to as "E & R," enrollment and review is a process by which previously adopted amendments are incorporated into a bill, and the bill is checked for technical and grammatical accuracy. This is done following passage on General and Select File.

=== Select file ===
Select File is the second debating and voting stage. This step allows another opportunity for amendment, compromise and reflection. Bills on Select File may be indefinitely postponed or advanced to the next stage. After Select File, bills are sent to E & R again to be rechecked. Bills then are reprinted for Final Reading.

=== Final reading and governor's approval ===
Once a bill passes both General and Select File, it advances to Final Reading. At this stage, no further amendments can be made, and the bill is read in full before a vote is taken (unless two-thirds of lawmakers vote to dispense with the at-large reading). If it passes, the bill is sent to the Governor for approval. The Governor has five days (excluding Sundays) to either sign the bill into law, veto it, or allow it to become law without a signature. If vetoed, the Legislature can override the veto with a 3/5ths majority vote.

=== Emergency clause and time to law ===
Some bills include an "emergency clause," which allows them to take effect immediately upon the Governor's signature. Otherwise, bills typically become law three calendar months after the Legislature adjourns.

=== People's right to referendum ===
Nebraska citizens have the right to challenge a bill through a referendum. To initiate this, a petition must be filed within 90 days of the Legislature's adjournment, and it must gather signatures from 5% of registered voters to suspend the law until a public vote. For the law to be repealed, signatures from 10% of registered voters are required. If the law is put on hold due to a successful petition, it will not go into effect until the outcome of the public vote.

== See also ==
- List of Nebraska state legislatures
- History of Nebraska
- Unicameral Youth Legislature
