= 1928 United States presidential election in Illinois =

- November 6, 1928

All 29 Illinois votes to the Electoral College

Nominee	Herbert Hoover	Al Smith
Party	Republican	Democratic
Home state	California	New York
Running mate	Charles Curtis	Joseph Taylor Robinson
Electoral vote	29	0
Popular vote	1,769,141	1,313,817
Percentage	56.93%	42.28%
County results
Hoover
50–60%
60–70%
70–80%
80–90%
Smith
50–60%
60–70%
President before election
Calvin Coolidge
Republican
Elected President
Herbert Hoover
Republican

The 1928 United States presidential election in Illinois took place on November 6, 1928, as part of the 1928 United States presidential election. State voters chose 29 representatives, or electors, to the Electoral College, who voted for president and vice president.

A strongly Democratic state during the Second Party System, Illinois became Republican-leaning after the American Civil War due to a combination of strong Free Soil Party heritage amongst its Yankee northern counties with the wartime conversion of some Virginian-settled rock-ribbed Democratic Southern Illinois counties to Unionist Republicanism à la Appalachia. Between the Civil War and World War I, partisanship in Illinois – like in the Border States – largely re-fought the war, with the result that although the Democratic Party gained at least 43 percent of the statewide vote via Southern and German Catholic support in every election up to 1900, they never gained an absolute majority and carried the state's electoral votes only in 1892.

Due to the Democratic Party's growing Populist and prohibitionist leanings, a decline in Democratic support after 1900 in its German Central Illinois strongholds transformed Illinois into a powerfully Republican state at all levels. Even Woodrow Wilson in 1912 when the GOP was mortally divided carried the state by only a very narrow margin, and in 1920 hostility to the League of Nations and the perceived anti-German bias of both outgoing President Wilson and new Democratic nominee and former Ohio Governor James M. Cox – the latter of whom had banned German-language instruction in Ohio schools – meant Harding carried Illinois by over 42 percentage points and the state was his sixth strongest in a national landslide. Thirteen German Catholic or southern-settled counties went Republican for the first time.

In 1924, Calvin Coolidge maintained Harding's dominance despite losing substantial German Catholic and Mississippi Valley industrial support to Progressive Wisconsin Senator Robert M. La Follette, whose family would endorse Catholic New York City Democrat Al Smith after the patriarch died in 1925. Despite some predictions of upheaval during April Hoover was easily nominated as the Republican candidate. Smith was nominated as the Democratic candidate. After the nominations were finalized, some critics felt Smith might have a chance of carrying electoral-vote-rich Illinois due to opposition to Hoover in the Farm Belt; however by the end of June Hoover asserted that the farm vote was safe after Lowden's supporters decided to aid the GOP nominee.

Hoover campaigned in Illinois after reports early in July suggested the popularity of Smith's “wet” stand in Chicago made his win in this traditionally Republican state doubtful. Smith did not visit the state during the summer, but relied on campaigning by members of the state Democratic ticket led by Thomas S. Donovan, mainly in Chicago but also in the Metro East region. During September, Donovan and the Democrats intensified their campaign in both liberal and anti-Prohibition Chicago and “dry” downstate Illinois.

At the end of the summer, the state was confused and few trends were apparent in early polling, with Republicans in metropolitan Chicago quarreling bitterly. However, by the end of September it was clear that religion was the paramount issue in the campaign and that it was driving Chicago toward Smith and the rest of the state toward Hoover (Smith was the first Catholic nominated by a major party for president).

Despite earlier doubts, the earliest poll by Literary Digest showed Hoover carrying Illinois by a two-to-one majority; however, increased registration in Cook County made the early Literary Digest polls seem dubious, and Hoover was winning only by five-to-three in the next poll in the second week of October, and only by twelve percentage points in the third week – at a time when Hoover was leading in 42 of 48 states. As things turned out, this last poll proved accurate. Smith would give his final Chicago campaign speech on October 17.

== Primaries ==
The primaries and general elections coincided with those for House as well as those for state offices.

=== Turnout ===
The total vote in the state-run primary elections (Democratic and Republican) was 1,228,537.

The total vote in the general election was 3,107,489. Both major parties held non-binding state-run preferential primaries on April 12.

=== Democratic ===
1928 Illinois Democratic presidential primary
- April 10, 1928
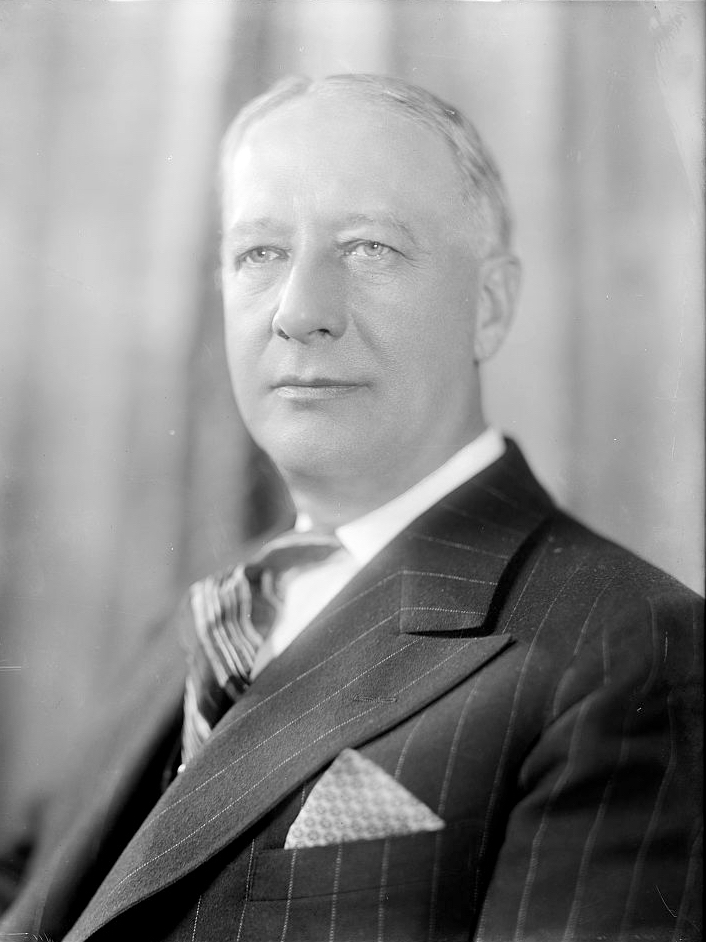

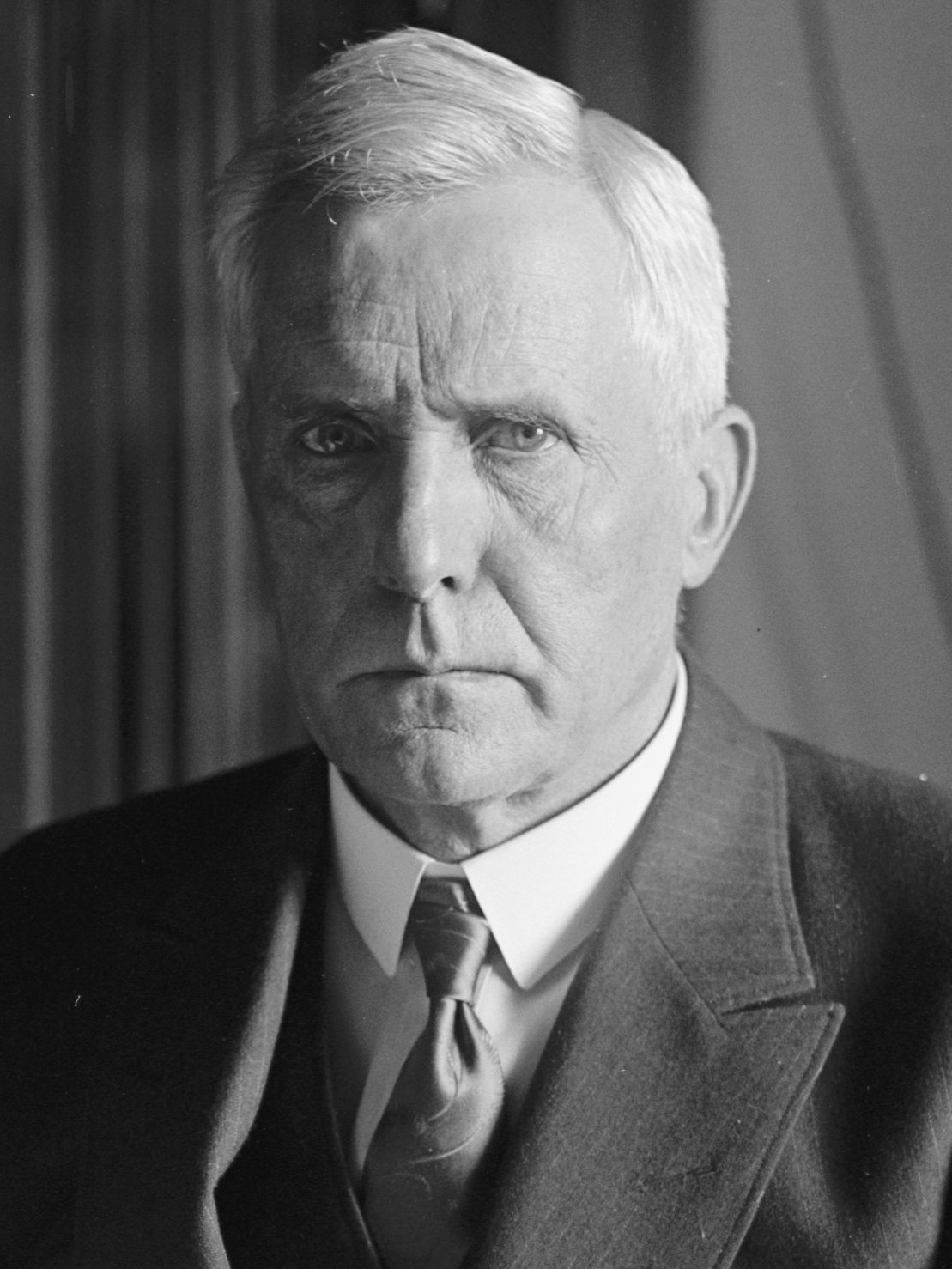
Candidate	Al Smith	James A. Reed
Home state	New York	Missouri
Popular vote	44,212	3,786
Percentage	91.11%	7.80%

The 1928 Illinois Democratic presidential primary was held on April 10, 1928, in the U.S. state of Illinois as one of the Democratic Party's state primaries ahead of the 1928 presidential election.

The popular vote was a non-binding "beauty contest". Delegates were instead elected by direct votes by congressional district on delegate candidates.

Al Smith easily won the primary, and was virtually unopposed for the Democratic nomination, with most other prominent Democrats standing out as they felt they had no hope of winning the general election.

1928 Illinois Democratic presidential primary
Candidate	Votes	%
Al Smith (write-in)	44,212	91.11
James A. Reed (write-in)	3,786	7.80
Thomas Walsh (write-in)	221	0.46
W.G. McAdoo (write-in)	213	0.44
E. T. Meredith (write-in)	57	0.12
Henry T. Rainey (write-in)	16	0.03
Scattering	204	0.42
Total	48,525	100

=== Republican ===
1928 Illinois Republican presidential primary
- April 10, 1928
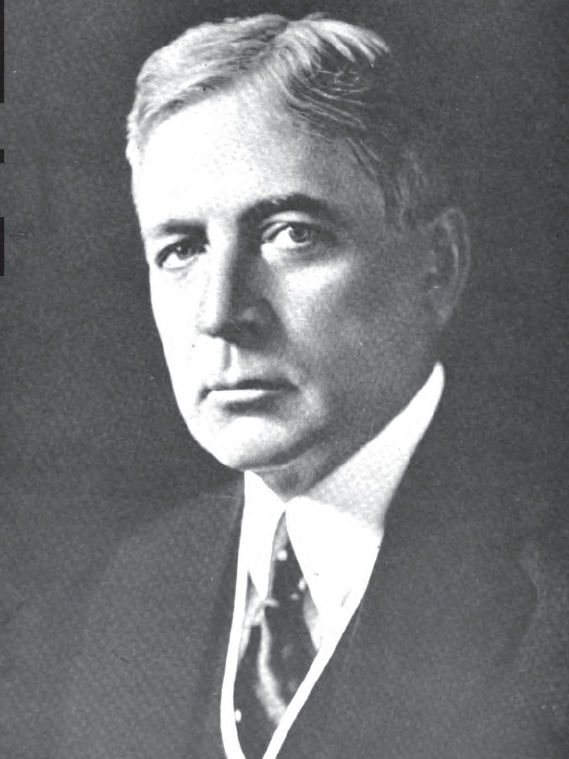
Candidate	Frank Orren Lowden
Home state	Illinois
Popular vote	345,498
Percentage	99.50%

The 1928 Illinois Republican presidential primary was held on April 10, 1928, in the U.S. state of Illinois as one of the Republican Party's state primaries ahead of the 1928 presidential election.

The preference vote was a "beauty contest". Delegates were instead selected by direct-vote in each congressional districts on delegate candidates.

The preference vote was won nearly unanimously by the only name on ballot, favorite son, Secretary of Commerce Frank Lowden.

1928 Illinois Republican presidential primary
Candidate	Votes	%
Frank Lowden	1,172,278	99.35
Herbert Hoover (write-in)	4,368	0.37
Calvin Coolidge (incumbent) (write-in)	2,420	0.21
Charles G. Dawes (write-in)	756	0.06
Scattering	190	0.02
Total	1,180,012	100

== Results ==
Presidential Candidate	Running Mate	Party	Electoral Vote (EV)	Popular Vote (PV)	
Herbert Hoover	Charles Curtis	Republican	29	1,769,141	56.93%
Al Smith	Joseph T. Robinson	Democratic	0	1,313,817	42.28%
Norman Thomas	James Maurer	Socialist	0	19,138	0.62%
William Z. Foster	Benjamin Gitlow	Workers Party America	0	3,581	0.12%
Verne L. Reynolds	Jeremiah D. Crowley	Socialist Labor	0	1,812	0.06%

=== Results by county ===
County	Herbert Clark Hoover Republican		Alfred Emmanuel Smith Democratic		Normal Mattoon Thomas Socialist		William Z. Foster Workers’ Party America		Verne L. Reynolds Socialist Labor		Margin		Total votes cast
County	#	%	#	%	#	%	#	%	#	%	#	%	Total votes cast
Adams	15,590	53.59%	13,215	45.42%	254	0.87%	13	0.04%	21	0.07%	2,375	8.16%	29,093
Alexander	5,666	61.24%	3,558	38.46%	21	0.23%	4	0.04%	3	0.03%	2,108	22.78%	9,252
Bond	4,160	64.06%	2,298	35.39%	30	0.46%	1	0.02%	5	0.08%	1,862	28.67%	6,494
Boone	5,965	80.95%	1,371	18.60%	30	0.41%	1	0.01%	2	0.03%	4,594	62.34%	7,369
Brown	2,289	54.96%	1,867	44.83%	6	0.14%	1	0.02%	2	0.05%	422	10.13%	4,165
Bureau	11,557	63.73%	6,486	35.77%	62	0.34%	12	0.07%	16	0.09%	5,071	27.97%	18,133
Calhoun	1,594	50.16%	1,551	48.80%	31	0.98%	2	0.06%	0	0.00%	43	1.35%	3,178
Carroll	6,197	76.34%	1,876	23.11%	41	0.51%	4	0.05%	0	0.00%	4,321	53.23%	8,118
Cass	4,009	53.50%	3,461	46.18%	17	0.23%	3	0.04%	4	0.05%	548	7.31%	7,494
Champaign	19,494	68.28%	8,915	31.23%	119	0.42%	11	0.04%	11	0.04%	10,579	37.05%	28,550
Christian	9,896	56.77%	7,345	42.14%	135	0.77%	37	0.21%	18	0.10%	2,551	14.63%	17,431
Clark	5,632	60.64%	3,621	38.99%	26	0.28%	6	0.06%	3	0.03%	2,011	21.65%	9,288
Clay	4,522	65.16%	2,418	34.84%	0	0.00%	0	0.00%	0	0.00%	2,104	30.32%	6,940
Clinton	3,031	30.77%	6,774	68.76%	39	0.40%	3	0.03%	5	0.05%	-3,743	-37.99%	9,852
Coles	11,479	69.12%	5,071	30.54%	39	0.23%	7	0.04%	11	0.07%	6,408	38.59%	16,607
Cook	812,063	52.73%	716,283	46.51%	8,971	0.58%	2,101	0.14%	753	0.05%	95,780	6.22%	1,540,171
Crawford	5,989	62.90%	3,495	36.70%	32	0.34%	4	0.04%	2	0.02%	2,494	26.19%	9,522
Cumberland	3,242	63.04%	1,873	36.42%	21	0.41%	5	0.10%	2	0.04%	1,369	26.62%	5,143
DeKalb	11,501	74.19%	3,940	25.41%	45	0.29%	15	0.10%	2	0.01%	7,561	48.77%	15,503
DeWitt	6,100	69.40%	2,631	29.93%	55	0.63%	2	0.02%	2	0.02%	3,469	39.47%	8,790
Douglas	4,890	68.19%	2,239	31.22%	40	0.56%	2	0.03%	0	0.00%	2,651	36.97%	7,171
DuPage	28,016	72.37%	10,479	27.07%	181	0.47%	13	0.03%	23	0.06%	17,537	45.30%	38,712
Edgar	7,509	58.27%	5,325	41.32%	42	0.33%	6	0.05%	4	0.03%	2,184	16.95%	12,886
Edwards	2,861	74.78%	950	24.83%	14	0.37%	1	0.03%	0	0.00%	1,911	49.95%	3,826
Effingham	3,882	47.26%	4,239	51.61%	85	1.03%	5	0.06%	3	0.04%	-357	-4.35%	8,214
Fayette	6,545	61.65%	3,998	37.66%	57	0.54%	6	0.06%	10	0.09%	2,547	23.99%	10,616
Ford	4,668	68.72%	2,098	30.88%	26	0.38%	1	0.01%	0	0.00%	2,570	37.83%	6,793
Franklin	9,900	45.79%	11,369	52.58%	161	0.74%	143	0.66%	49	0.23%	-1,469	-6.79%	21,622
Fulton	10,600	59.95%	6,591	37.28%	454	2.57%	11	0.06%	24	0.14%	4,009	22.68%	17,680
Gallatin	2,002	45.78%	2,343	53.58%	22	0.50%	1	0.02%	5	0.11%	-341	-7.80%	4,373
Greene	4,299	51.05%	4,076	48.40%	40	0.48%	3	0.04%	3	0.04%	223	2.65%	8,421
Grundy	5,126	61.54%	3,174	38.11%	23	0.28%	2	0.02%	4	0.05%	1,952	23.44%	8,329
Hamilton	3,275	51.08%	3,037	47.36%	75	1.17%	20	0.31%	5	0.08%	238	3.71%	6,412
Hancock	7,795	58.65%	5,447	40.99%	35	0.26%	5	0.04%	8	0.06%	2,348	17.67%	13,290
Hardin	1,758	64.35%	933	34.15%	28	1.02%	3	0.11%	10	0.37%	825	30.20%	2,732
Henderson	2,695	71.11%	1,065	28.10%	26	0.69%	2	0.05%	2	0.05%	1,630	43.01%	3,790
Henry	14,666	70.83%	5,858	28.29%	167	0.81%	7	0.03%	9	0.04%	8,808	42.54%	20,707
Iroquois	8,453	60.71%	5,421	38.94%	38	0.27%	4	0.03%	7	0.05%	3,032	21.78%	13,923
Jackson	9,180	60.79%	5,836	38.64%	75	0.50%	6	0.04%	5	0.03%	3,344	22.14%	15,102
Jasper	3,201	51.04%	3,055	48.71%	14	0.22%	2	0.03%	0	0.00%	146	2.33%	6,272
Jefferson	7,326	55.08%	5,905	44.40%	62	0.47%	4	0.03%	4	0.03%	1,421	10.68%	13,301
Jersey	2,993	54.62%	2,473	45.13%	11	0.20%	3	0.05%	0	0.00%	520	9.49%	5,480
Jo Daviess	6,333	61.59%	3,856	37.50%	88	0.86%	3	0.03%	3	0.03%	2,477	24.09%	10,283
Johnson	2,892	70.69%	1,163	28.43%	30	0.73%	4	0.10%	2	0.05%	1,729	42.26%	4,091
Kane	38,236	69.94%	16,184	29.60%	220	0.40%	15	0.03%	18	0.03%	22,052	40.33%	54,673
Kankakee	11,905	53.44%	10,247	45.99%	120	0.54%	3	0.01%	4	0.02%	1,658	7.44%	22,279
Kendall	3,589	75.53%	1,154	24.28%	8	0.17%	1	0.02%	0	0.00%	2,435	51.24%	4,752
Knox	16,151	72.33%	5,993	26.84%	173	0.77%	3	0.01%	10	0.04%	10,158	45.49%	22,330
Lake	26,814	67.73%	12,252	30.95%	339	0.86%	150	0.38%	32	0.08%	14,562	36.78%	39,587
LaSalle	24,039	53.15%	20,807	46.00%	354	0.78%	12	0.03%	16	0.04%	3,232	7.15%	45,228
Lawrence	5,851	60.16%	3,806	39.13%	53	0.54%	8	0.08%	8	0.08%	2,045	21.03%	9,726
Lee	9,238	67.14%	4,476	32.53%	38	0.28%	5	0.04%	3	0.02%	4,762	34.61%	13,760
Livingston	11,161	65.68%	5,737	33.76%	84	0.49%	2	0.01%	8	0.05%	5,424	31.92%	16,992
Logan	7,631	59.97%	5,019	39.44%	60	0.47%	10	0.08%	5	0.04%	2,612	20.53%	12,725
Macon	24,492	70.68%	9,932	28.66%	194	0.56%	12	0.03%	24	0.07%	14,560	42.02%	34,654
Macoupin	10,699	47.68%	11,290	50.32%	350	1.56%	81	0.36%	18	0.08%	-591	-2.63%	22,438
Madison	28,028	53.48%	23,658	45.14%	540	1.03%	119	0.23%	61	0.12%	4,370	8.34%	52,406
Marion	9,110	60.52%	5,823	38.69%	85	0.56%	10	0.07%	24	0.16%	3,287	21.84%	15,052
Marshall	4,029	58.69%	2,828	41.19%	7	0.10%	1	0.01%	0	0.00%	1,201	17.49%	6,865
Mason	3,956	54.78%	3,246	44.95%	17	0.24%	2	0.03%	0	0.00%	710	9.83%	7,221
Massac	3,405	72.87%	1,241	26.56%	13	0.28%	12	0.26%	2	0.04%	2,164	46.31%	4,673
McDonough	8,953	68.15%	4,104	31.24%	69	0.53%	4	0.03%	8	0.06%	4,849	36.91%	13,138
McHenry	10,661	65.33%	5,596	34.29%	57	0.35%	4	0.02%	1	0.01%	5,065	31.04%	16,319
McLean	20,780	65.37%	10,742	33.79%	240	0.75%	11	0.03%	16	0.05%	10,038	31.58%	31,789
Menard	3,243	64.54%	1,742	34.67%	34	0.68%	6	0.12%	0	0.00%	1,501	29.87%	5,025
Mercer	5,699	70.59%	2,316	28.69%	51	0.63%	4	0.05%	3	0.04%	3,383	41.91%	8,073
Monroe	2,721	48.03%	2,934	51.79%	8	0.14%	2	0.04%	0	0.00%	-213	-3.76%	5,665
Montgomery	8,999	54.29%	7,392	44.60%	123	0.74%	48	0.29%	13	0.08%	1,607	9.70%	16,575
Morgan	10,192	63.52%	5,805	36.18%	31	0.19%	8	0.05%	10	0.06%	4,387	27.34%	16,046
Moultrie	3,310	60.31%	2,168	39.50%	9	0.16%	1	0.02%	0	0.00%	1,142	20.81%	5,488
Ogle	9,808	76.53%	2,961	23.10%	43	0.34%	1	0.01%	3	0.02%	6,847	53.43%	12,816
Peoria	31,024	56.50%	23,150	42.16%	632	1.15%	31	0.06%	76	0.14%	7,874	14.34%	54,913
Perry	4,636	47.47%	5,029	51.49%	67	0.69%	7	0.07%	27	0.28%	-393	-4.02%	9,766
Piatt	4,565	69.62%	1,959	29.88%	23	0.35%	3	0.05%	7	0.11%	2,606	39.74%	6,557
Pike	6,705	61.88%	4,008	36.99%	110	1.02%	8	0.07%	5	0.05%	2,697	24.89%	10,836
Pope	2,004	74.06%	679	25.09%	20	0.74%	3	0.11%	0	0.00%	1,325	48.97%	2,706
Pulaski	3,319	65.18%	1,726	33.90%	34	0.67%	10	0.20%	3	0.06%	1,593	31.28%	5,092
Putnam	1,387	61.10%	869	38.28%	11	0.48%	2	0.09%	1	0.04%	518	22.82%	2,270
Randolph	5,739	47.46%	6,251	51.69%	93	0.77%	3	0.02%	7	0.06%	-512	-4.23%	12,093
Richland	4,042	61.03%	2,550	38.50%	23	0.35%	2	0.03%	6	0.09%	1,492	22.53%	6,623
Rock Island	27,246	65.22%	14,334	34.31%	132	0.32%	45	0.11%	19	0.05%	12,912	30.91%	41,776
Saline	7,525	53.82%	6,337	45.32%	87	0.62%	17	0.12%	17	0.12%	1,188	8.50%	13,983
Sangamon	31,957	59.99%	21,026	39.47%	174	0.33%	78	0.15%	36	0.07%	10,931	20.52%	53,271
Schuyler	3,011	54.00%	2,542	45.59%	16	0.29%	1	0.02%	6	0.11%	469	8.41%	5,576
Scott	2,601	59.96%	1,730	39.88%	5	0.12%	2	0.05%	0	0.00%	871	20.08%	4,338
Shelby	7,214	62.58%	4,071	35.31%	243	2.11%	0	0.00%	0	0.00%	3,143	27.26%	11,528
St. Clair	31,026	45.60%	36,374	53.46%	506	0.74%	76	0.11%	55	0.08%	-5,348	-7.86%	68,037
Stark	2,966	69.09%	1,306	30.42%	19	0.44%	2	0.05%	0	0.00%	1,660	38.67%	4,293
Stephenson	11,992	67.97%	5,579	31.62%	62	0.35%	3	0.02%	7	0.04%	6,413	36.35%	17,643
Tazewell	9,409	56.73%	6,910	41.66%	248	1.50%	3	0.02%	16	0.10%	2,499	15.07%	16,586
Union	3,352	44.52%	4,149	55.10%	24	0.32%	4	0.05%	1	0.01%	-797	-10.58%	7,530
Vermilion	21,616	62.26%	12,728	36.66%	259	0.75%	59	0.17%	55	0.16%	8,888	25.60%	34,717
Wabash	2,373	37.26%	3,955	62.10%	33	0.52%	5	0.08%	3	0.05%	-1,582	-24.84%	6,369
Warren	7,915	73.61%	2,681	24.93%	146	1.36%	4	0.04%	7	0.07%	5,234	48.67%	10,753
Washington	3,638	55.90%	2,848	43.76%	22	0.34%	0	0.00%	0	0.00%	790	12.14%	6,508
Wayne	5,189	62.04%	3,108	37.16%	57	0.68%	5	0.06%	5	0.06%	2,081	24.88%	8,364
White	4,177	53.01%	3,666	46.53%	28	0.36%	5	0.06%	3	0.04%	511	6.49%	7,879
Whiteside	13,580	76.60%	4,079	23.01%	61	0.34%	2	0.01%	6	0.03%	9,501	53.59%	17,728
Will	26,081	55.02%	20,877	44.04%	413	0.87%	18	0.04%	16	0.03%	5,204	10.98%	47,405
Williamson	10,913	51.21%	10,139	47.58%	166	0.78%	62	0.29%	29	0.14%	774	3.63%	21,309
Winnebago	33,258	80.39%	7,684	18.57%	269	0.65%	121	0.29%	40	0.10%	25,574	61.81%	41,372
Woodford	5,140	60.30%	3,311	38.84%	67	0.79%	5	0.06%	1	0.01%	1,829	21.46%	8,524
Totals	1,769,141	56.93%	1,313,817	42.28%	19,138	0.62%	3,581	0.12%	1,812	0.06%	455,324	14.65%	3,107,489

== Analysis ==
Hoover carried Illinois by a 14-point margin, which was nonetheless a major decline upon the two preceding elections and the first time Illinois had voted more Democratic than the nation at large since Stephen A. Douglas in 1860. Smith did make major gains in heavily Catholic Chicago – despite reservations from the city's large Polish-American population about his Irish and Tammany background – but he failed to carry Cook County despite doubling Davis’ 1924 vote share. In the most heavily anti-Catholic areas – Scandinavian Rockford and Ozark Bible Belt-influenced Southern Illinois – the GOP vote held firm or rose and this was enough to ensure Smith had no chance of carrying the state.

== See also ==
- United States presidential elections in Illinois
