= 1928 New Jersey Democratic presidential primary =

1928 New Jersey Democratic presidential primaries
- May 15, 1928
- Presidential delegate primary

28 Democratic National Convention delegates

Candidate	Uncommitted	Al Smith
Home state		New York
Delegate count	17	11
Popular vote	178,208	100,007
Percentage	64.1%	35.9%
- Presidential preference primary (non-binding)

No Democratic National Convention delegates
Candidate	Al Smith (write-in)
Home state	New York
Popular vote	28,506
Percentage	100.0%

The 1928 New Jersey Democratic presidential primary was held on May 15, 1928, in New Jersey as one of the Democratic Party's statewide nomination contests ahead of the 1928 United States presidential election. Delegates to the 1928 Democratic National Convention were elected from each of the state's congressional districts, along with eight delegates at-large.

Most delegate races were uncontested; in fact, the only contested races were in two districts where multiple supporters of New York governor Al Smith competed against each other for the same slot. Many of the delegates who were formally uncommitted also supported Smith regardless. Ultimately, the delegation voted for Smith unanimously at the national convention.

== Background ==
=== Procedure ===
In 1928, New Jersey was allocated 28 total delegates to the Democratic National Convention. Four delegates were elected at-large, and two delegates were elected from each of the state's twelve congressional districts, along with two alternates. Delegates were given the choice of pledging support to a particular candidate or running as uncommitted delegates.

Since most races were ultimately uncontested, the real contest was to be selected for party support to access the ballot; local party leaders designated preferred delegates ahead of time, determining who would likely represent the district at the convention. The May primary formally ratified their choices.

The state also held a presidential preference primary, but no candidates were on the ballot. Fewer than 30,000 votes were recorded as write-ins for Al Smith.

== Campaign ==
The county leaders from the second congressional district met on March 18 at the Ritz-Carlton in Atlantic City to endorse Smith and designate their delegate slate, which consisted of Atlantic County party chair Charles I. Lafferty and state committeeman William B. Vandegrift.

== Endorsements ==
Al Smith

U.S. representatives

- Daniel F. Minahan, former U.S. representative from New Jersey's 9th congressional district (ran for district delegate)

State legislators

- John A. Matthews, former assemblyman from Newark (ran for district delegate)

Local officials

- George V. McDonough, member of the West Orange Town Commission (ran for district delegate)

Party officials

- Charles I. Lafferty, chair of the Atlantic County Democratic Party
- William B. Vandegrift, member of the Democratic State Committee from Burlington County
Uncommitted

U.S. representatives

- Oscar L. Auf der Heide, U.S. representative from New Jersey's 11th congressional district (ran for district delegate)

Individuals

- John J. Quinn, vice president of Raritan Trust Company of Perth Amboy and brother of Arthur A. Quinn (ran for district delegate)

== Results ==
1928 New Jersey Democratic presidential preference primary}
Party	Candidate	Votes	%
Democratic	Al Smith (write-in)	28,506	100.00%
Total votes		28,506	100.00%

=== Results by contest ===
1928 New Jersey Democratic primary
Contest	Delegates and popular vote		
Contest	Uncommitted	Smith	Total
At-large	4; 1,170,433 (100.00%)	–	
1st district	–	2; 15,199 (100.00%)	15,199
2nd district	2 (Note: Supported Al Smith.); 11,907 (100.00%)	–	11,907
3rd district	2; 22,920 (100.00%)	–	22,920
4th district	2 (Note: As "Regular Democrats".); 22,637 (100.00%)	–	22,637
5th district	–	2 (Note: Three candidates ran in the fifth district; all three were pledged to Al Smith.); 20,481 (100.00%)	20,481
6th district	2; 23,305 (100.00%)	–	23,305
7th district	–	2; 16,454 (100.00%)	16,454
8th district	1; 13,249 (49.96%)	1; 13,268 (50.04%)	26,517
9th district	–	2; 12,407 (100.00%)	12,407
10th district	–	2 (Note: Three candidates ran in the tenth district; all three were pledged to Al Smith.); 22,198 (100.00%)	22,198
11th district	2; 49,350 (100.00%)	–	49,350
12th district	2; 34,840 (100.00%)	–	34,840
Total	13 178,208 (64.05%)	11 100,007 (35.95%)	278,215

== Aftermath ==
Ultimately, the New Jersey delegation unanimously supported Smith at the 1928 Democratic National Convention.

== See also ==
- 1928 Democratic Party presidential primaries
- 1928 Democratic National Convention
- 1928 New Jersey Republican presidential primary
