= 1928 New Jersey Republican presidential primary =

1928 New Jersey Republican presidential primaries
- May 15, 1928
- Presidential delegate primary

31 Republican National Convention delegates

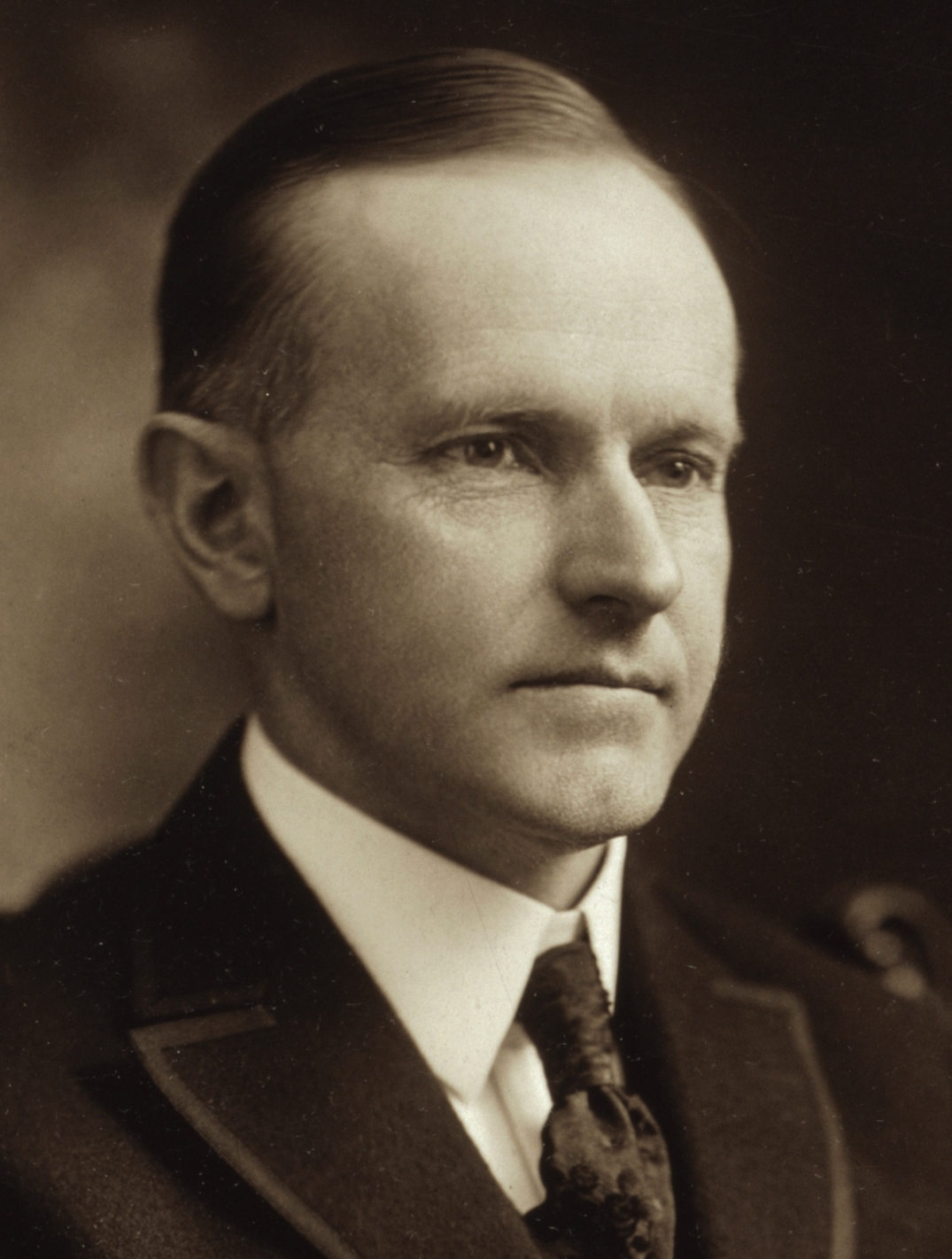

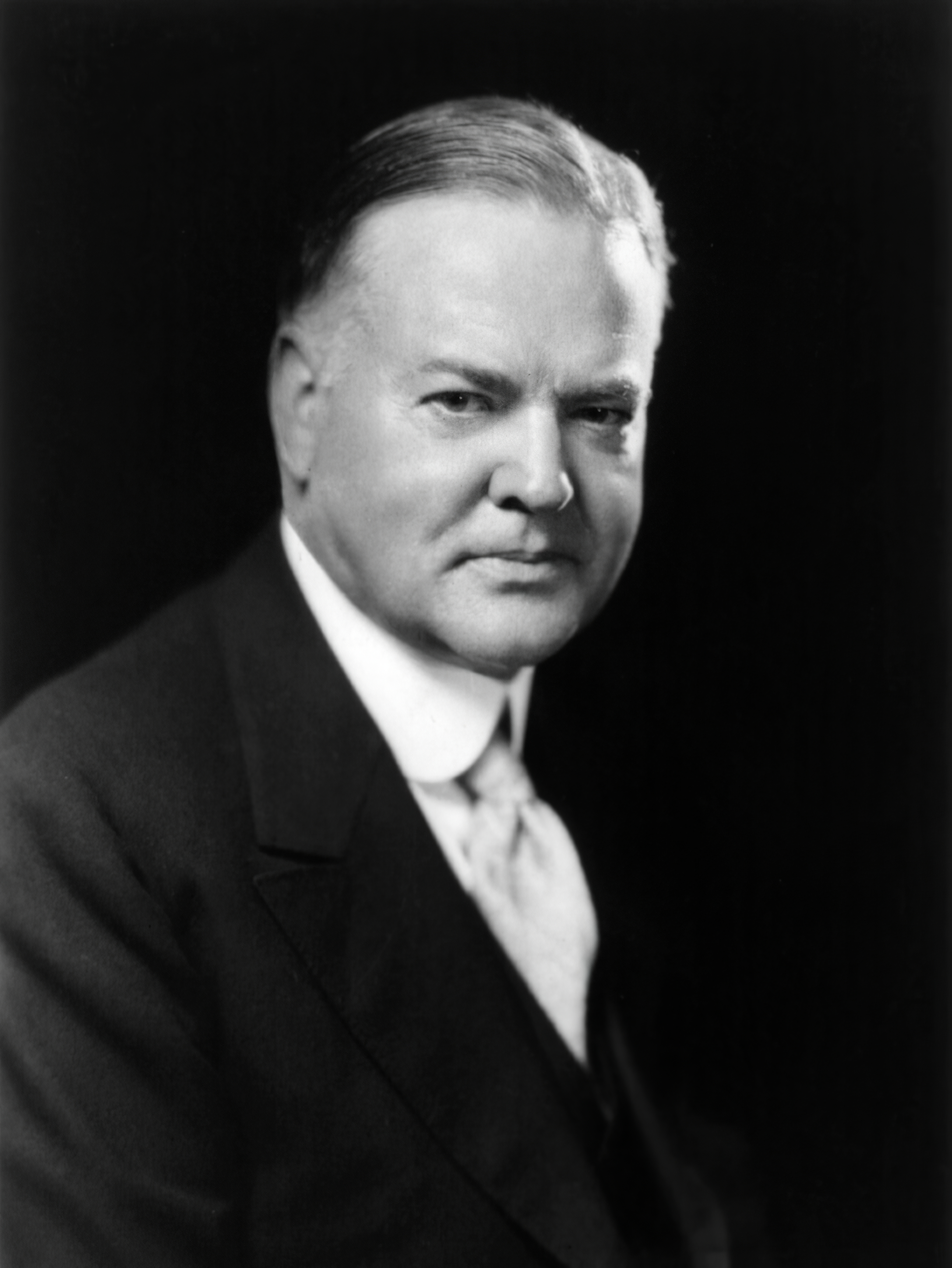
Candidate	Uncommitted	Calvin Coolidge (draft effort)	Herbert Hoover
Home state		Massachusetts	California
Delegate count	17	8	6
Popular vote	335,464	170,071	227,184
Percentage	43.9%	22.3%	29.8%
- Presidential preference primary (non-binding)

No Republican National Convention delegates
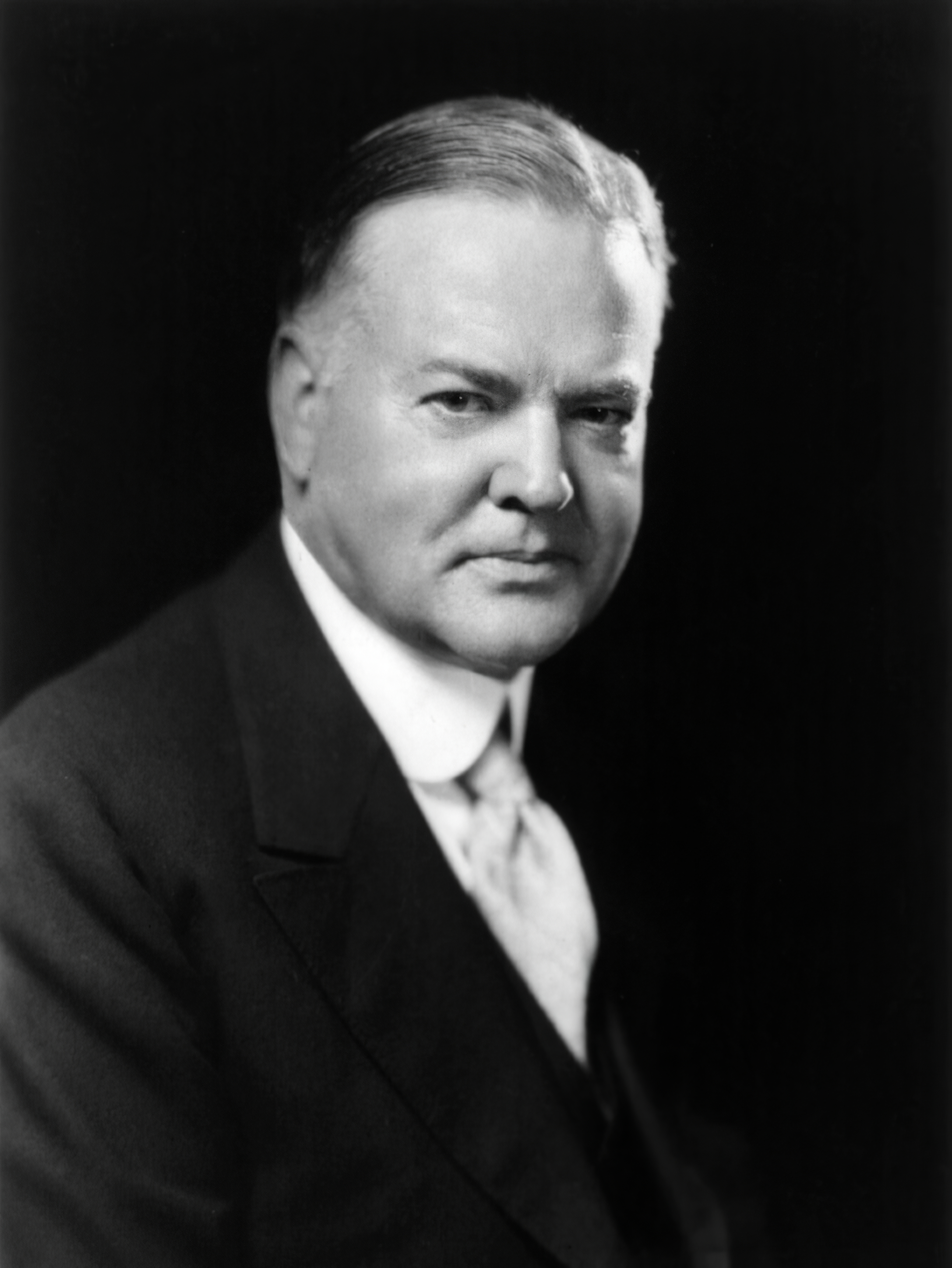
Candidate	Herbert Hoover
Home state	California
Popular vote	382,907
Percentage	100.0%

The 1928 New Jersey Republican presidential primary was held on May 15, 1928, in New Jersey as one of the Republican Party's statewide nomination contests ahead of the 1928 United States presidential election. Delegates to the 1928 Republican National Convention were elected from each of the state's congressional districts, along with seven delegates at-large.

The majority of the elected delegates were not publicly committed to supporting any candidate; of the pledged delegates, six supported Secretary of Commerce Herbert Hoover, while another eight supported incumbent President Calvin Coolidge with Hoover as their second choice. Because Coolidge had publicly demurred on his decision to run for re-election, this effectively pledged the delegation to support Hoover on the first ballot.

== Background ==
=== Procedure ===
In 1928, New Jersey was allocated 31 total delegates to the Republican National Convention. Seven delegates were elected at-large, and two delegates were elected from each of the state's twelve congressional districts, along with two alternates. Delegates were given the choice of pledging support to a particular candidate or running as uncommitted delegates.

The state also held a presidential preference primary, but Herbert Hoover was the only candidate on the ballot, and write-in votes were not recorded.

== Endorsements ==
Calvin Coolidge

State legislators

- Thomas A. Mathis, state senator for Ocean County (ran for district delegate)
Herbert Hoover

State executive branch officials

- Newton A.K. Bugbee, New Jersey Comptroller and former chair of the New Jersey Republican Party (ran for district delegate)

State legislators

- Francis B. Davis, state senator for Gloucester County (ran for district delegate)
- Thomas A. Mathis, state senator for Ocean County (ran for district delegate) (second choice)
- Albert S. Woodruff, former state senator for Camden County (ran for district delegate)

Individuals

- Preston Foster, actor (ran for district alternate)
Uncommitted

U.S. representatives

- Isaac Bacharach, U.S. representative from Atlantic City (ran for district delegate)

Individuals

- John Reynard Todd, lawyer and businessman (ran for district delegate)

== Results ==
1928 New Jersey Republican presidential preference primary
Party	Candidate	Votes	%
Republican	Herbert Hoover	382,907	100.00%
Total votes		382,907	100.00%

=== Delegate primary results ===
Delegate slate	Candidate	Delegate candidates		Delegates		Aggregate votes	
Delegate slate	Candidate	Statewide	District	Total	Of total (%)	Total	Of total (%)
Uncommitted	—N/a	7	11	17	54.84	335,464	43.95
Coolidge First Choice, Hoover Second Choice	Calvin Coolidge	0	8	8	25.81	170,071	22.28
Herbert Hoover	Herbert Hoover	0	7	6	19.35	227,184	29.76
Frank O. Lowden, "America First"	Frank Lowden	0	6	0	0	28,288	3.71
Walter E. Edge	Walter E. Edge	0	1	0	0	2,315	0.30
Total		7	33	31	100.0	1,246,302	100.00
Registered voters, and turnout							

==== Delegate primary results by contest ====
1928 New Jersey Republican primary
Contest	Delegates and popular vote					
Contest	Uncommitted	Coolidge	Hoover	Lowden	Edge	Total
At-large	7; 2,512,475 (100.00%)	–	–	–	–	2,512,475
1st district	–	–	2; 118,127 (100.00%)	–	–	118,127
2nd district	2 (Note: Includes 11,157 votes for James A. Lightfoot as an "Uninstructed" delegate.); 112,418 (100.00%)	–	–	–	–	112,418
3rd district	–	2 (Note: Delegates pledged to Hoover as a second choice.); 64,575 (80.85%)	–	15,292 (19.15%)	–	79,867
4th district	–	–	2; 46,010 (81.91%)	10,163 (18.09%)	–	56,173
5th district	2; 78,967 (100.00%)	–	–	–	–	78,967
6th district	–	2; 72,446 (83.78%)	14,030 (16.22%)	–	–	86,476
7th district	–	–	2; 49,017 (81.91%)	–	2,315 (18.09%)	51,332
8th district	2; 46,962 (100.00%)	–	–	–	–	46,962
9th district	2; 37,814 (100.00%)	–	–	–	–	37,814
10th district	2; 59,303 (100.00%)	–	–	–	–	59,303
11th district	–	2; 10,869 (80.85%)	–	–	–	10,869
12th district	–	2; 22,181 (88.67%)	–	2,833 (11.33%)	–	25,014
Total	17 335,464 (43.95%)	8 170,071 (22.28%)	6 227,184 (29.76%)	28,288 (3.71%)	2,315 (0.30%)	763,322

== Aftermath ==
Ultimately, the New Jersey delegation unanimously supported Hoover at the 1928 Republican National Convention.
