= 1928 Democratic Party presidential primaries =

Selection of the Democratic Party nominee

- March 6 to May 18, 1928

1,098 delegates to the 1928 Democratic National Convention 732 (two-thirds) votes needed to win

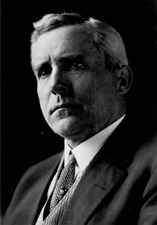

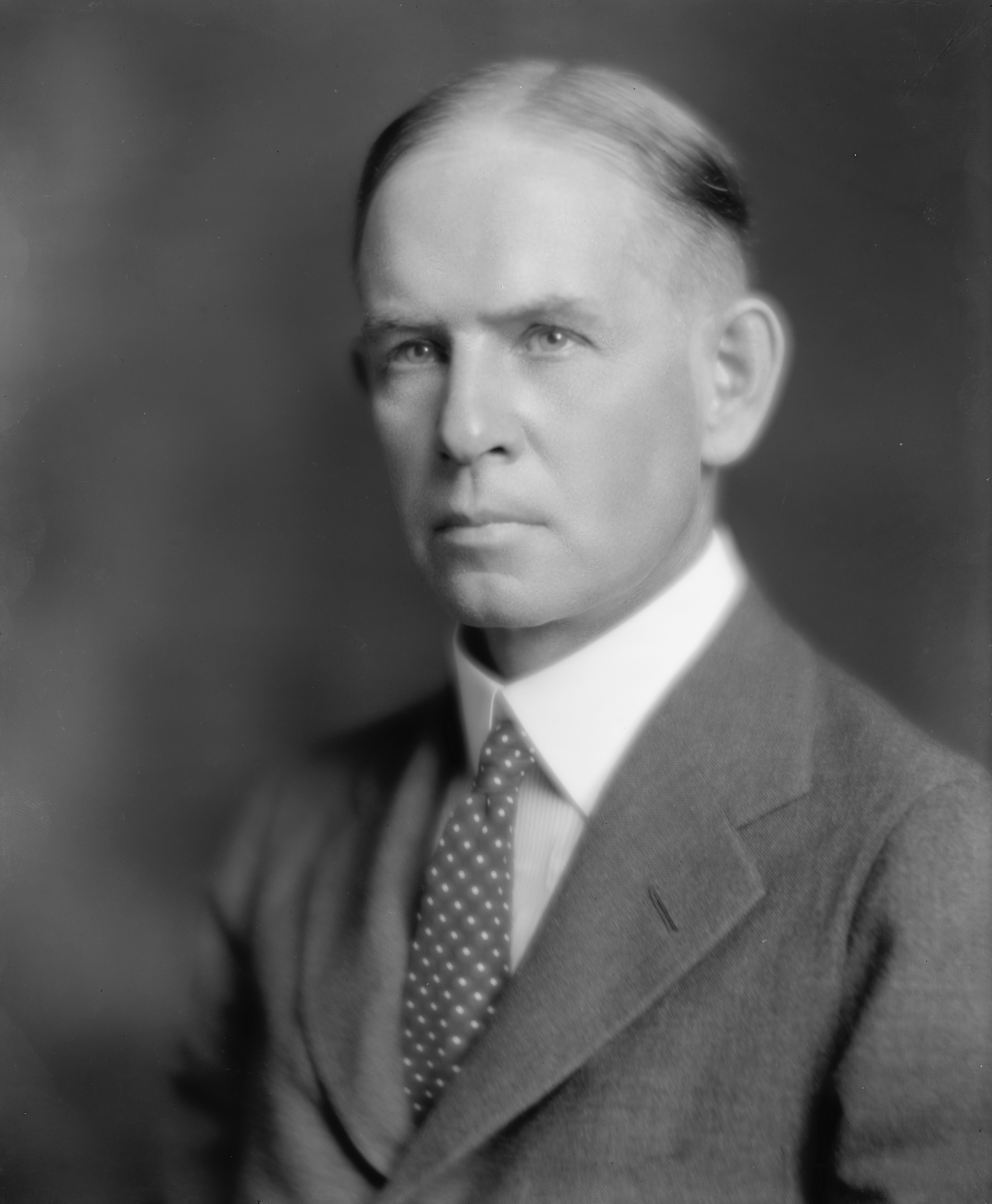

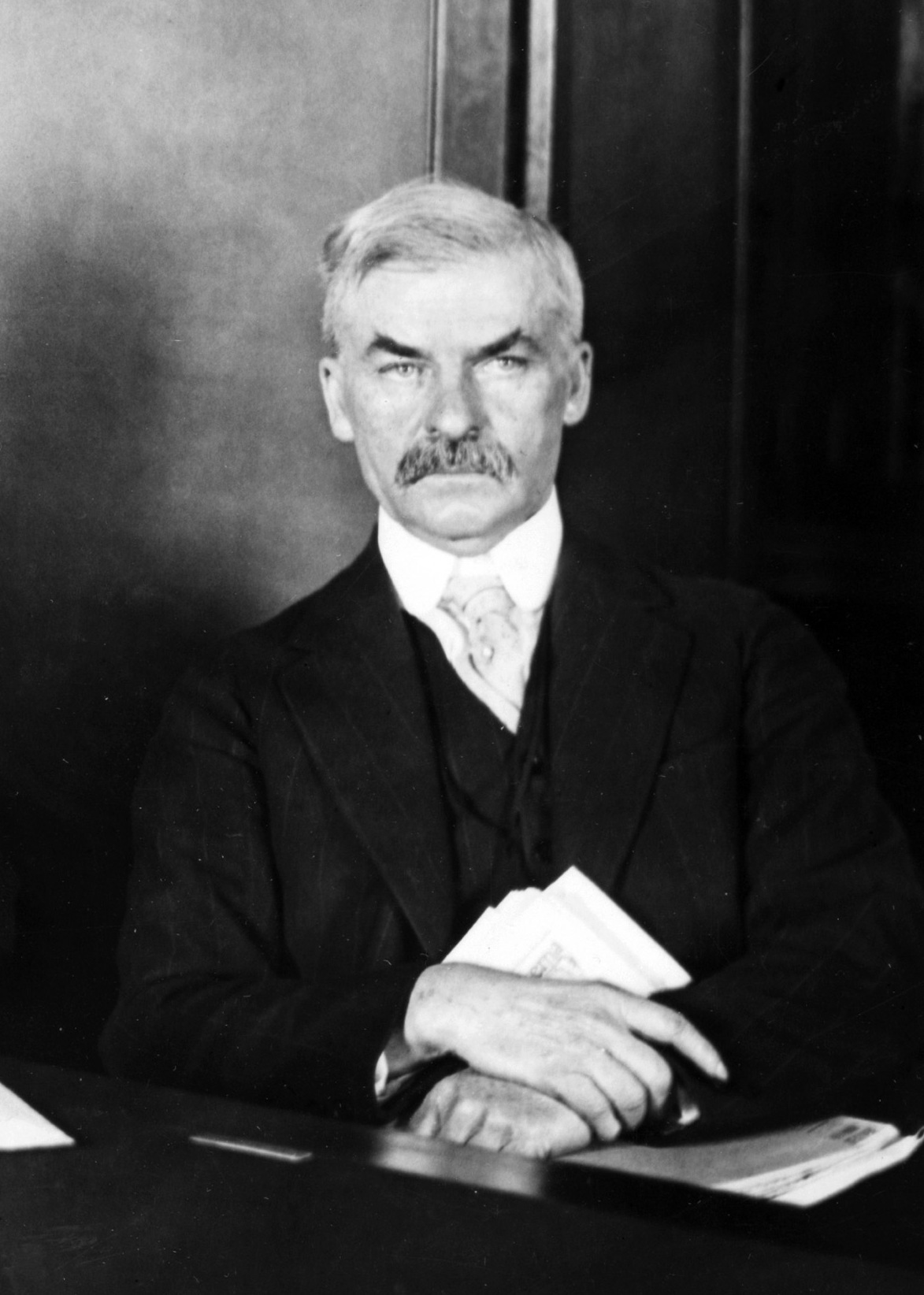

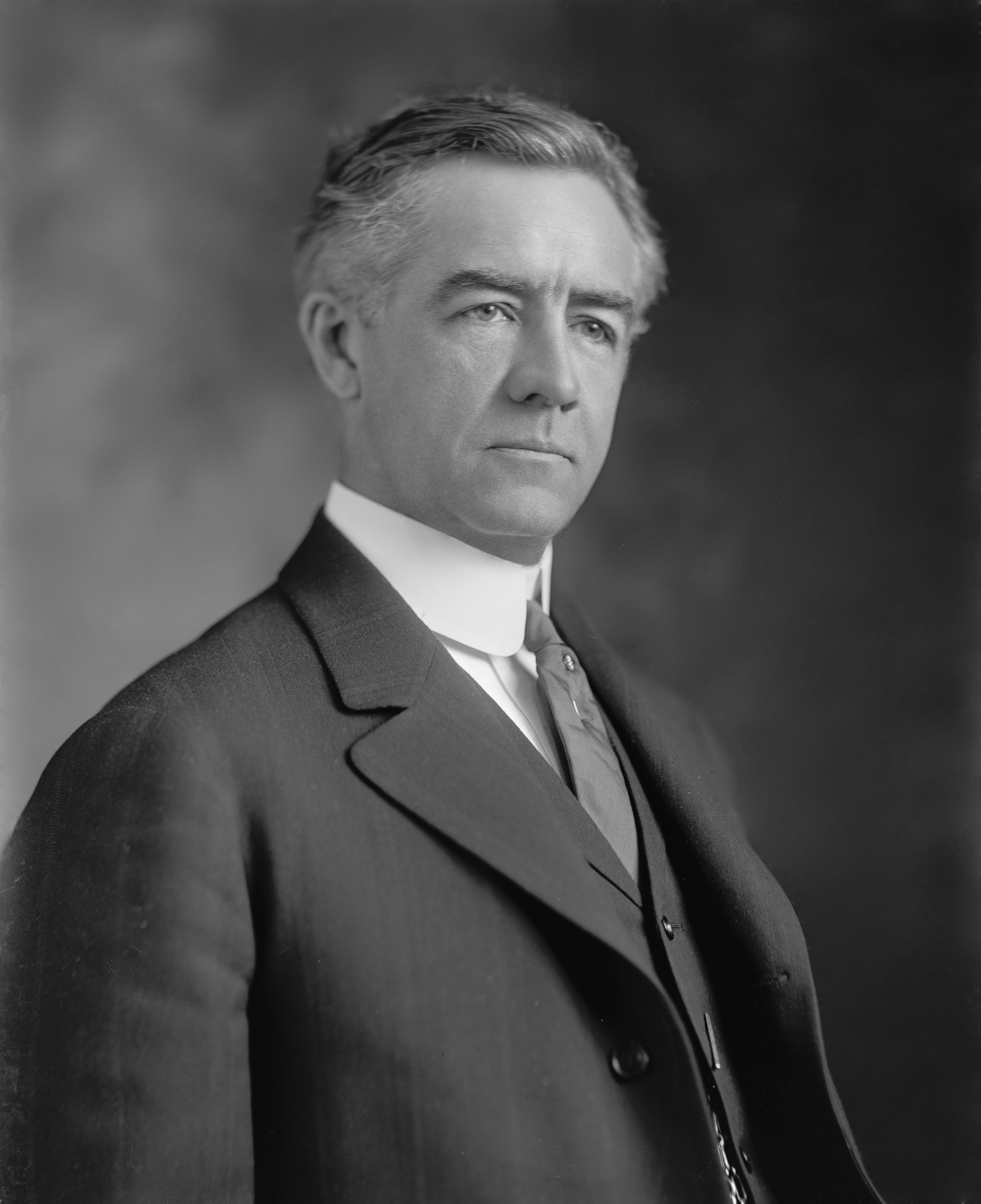

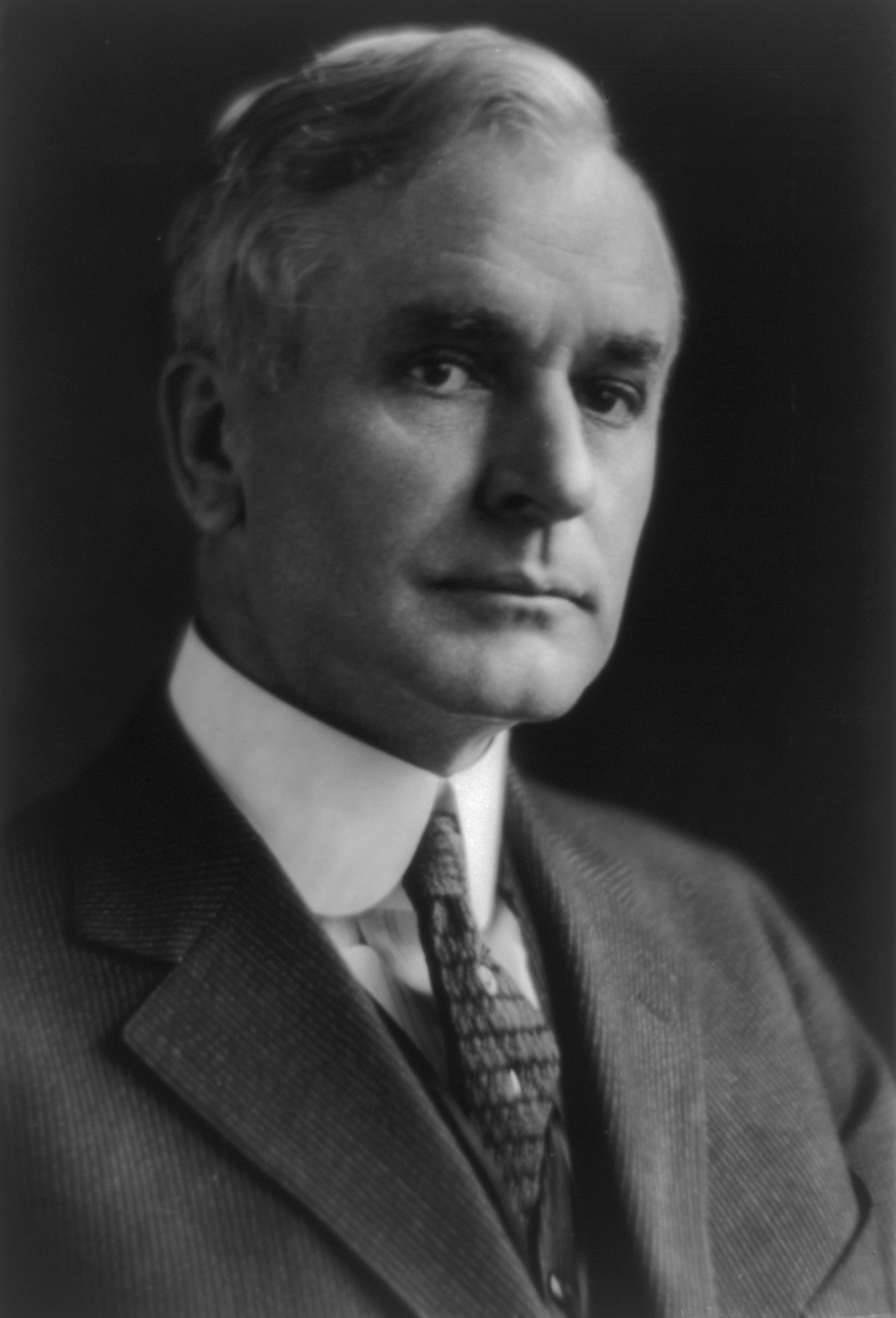

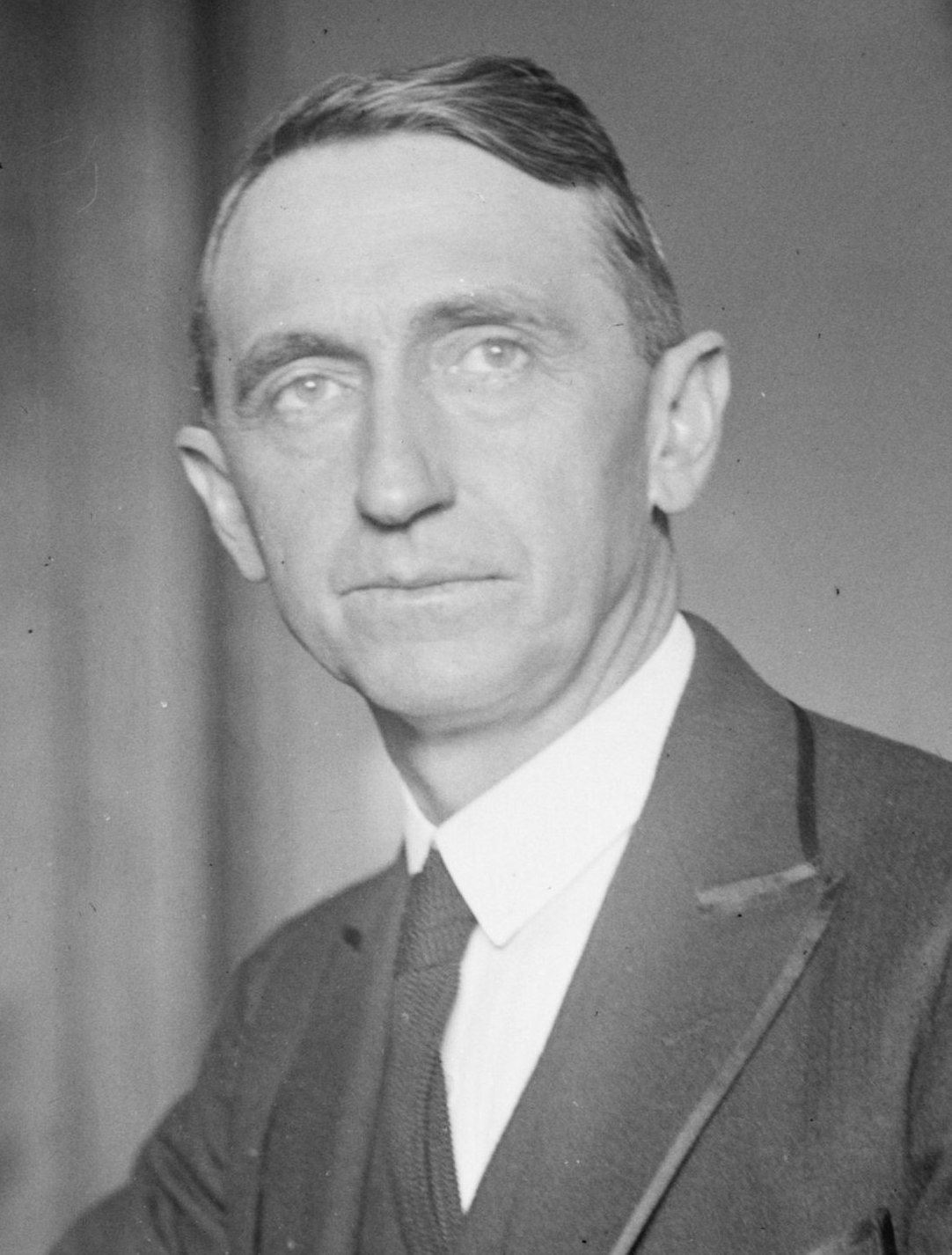
Candidate	Al Smith	James Reed	Evans Woollen
Home state	New York	Missouri	Indiana
Delegate count	724.67	48	32
Contests won	12	1	1
Popular vote	559,265	207,455	146,934
Percentage	41.66%	15.5%
Candidate	Thomas J. Walsh	Gilbert Hitchcock	Cordell Hull
Home state	Montana	Nebraska	Tennessee
Delegate count	0	16	71.83
Contests won	0	1	0
Popular vote	101,305	51,019	—
Percentage	7.6%		—
Candidate	Walter F. George
Home state	Georgia
Delegate count	52.5
Contests won	0
Popular vote	—
Percentage	—
- First place by convention roll call Smith Hull George Various
Previous Democratic nominee
John W. Davis
Democratic nominee
Al Smith

From March 6 to May 18, 1928, voters of the Democratic Party elected delegates to the 1928 Democratic National Convention, for the purpose of choosing the party's nominee for president in the 1928 election.

In sharp contrast to the three previous open nominations, the delegate selections were all-but-conclusive in favor of New York governor Al Smith, who entered the convention only a few votes short of the required two-thirds majority; he won on the first ballot after several delegates shifted to him. Smith was the first Catholic nominated by a major party for President of the United States and the first non-incumbent Democrat to win his party's nomination on the first ballot since 1908.

Despite his easy nomination, his failure to carry most Southern states was a sign of things to come; Smith lost the general election to Herbert Hoover in a landslide, with many Southern voters defecting to the Republican Party over their opposition to Smith's Catholic faith.

== Candidates ==
=== Nominee ===
Candidate	Most recent position	Home state	Campaign	Popular vote	Contests won	Running mate
Al Smith	42nd Governor of New York (1919–20, 1923–28)	New York	(Campaign • Positions); Secured nomination: June 26–28, 1928	559,265 (41.7%)	[data missing]	Joseph Taylor Robinson

=== Withdrew during convention ===
Candidate	Most recent position	Home state	Campaign	Popular vote	Contests won
Walter F. George	U.S. Senator from Georgia (1922–1957)	Georgia		—	AL, FL, GA
Cordell Hull	U.S. Representative from Tennessee (1907–21, 1923–31)	Tennessee		—	NC, TN, VA
James A. Reed	U.S. Senator from Missouri (1911–1929)	Missouri		207,455 (15.5%)	[data missing]
Thomas J. Walsh	U.S. Senator from Montana (1913–1933)	Montana		101,305 (7.6%)	[data missing]

=== Favorite sons ===
The following candidates ran only in their home state's primary or caucus for the purpose of controlling its delegate slate at the convention and did not appear to be considered national candidates by the media.

- Governor A. Victor Donahey of Ohio
- U.S. Senator Pat Harrison of Mississippi
- Former U.S. Senator Gilbert Hitchcock of Nebraska
- Businessman Jesse H. Jones of Texas
- Former U.S. Senator Atlee Pomerene of Ohio
- Chief Justice Richard C. Watts of South Carolina
- Banker Evans Woollen of Indiana

== Primaries ==
		Al; Smith	James; Reed	Evans; Woollen	Thomas; Walsh	Gilbert; Hitchcock	Atlee; Pomerene	Victor; Donahey	Uncommitted	Others
March 6	South Dakota (caucus)	51.56% (43,876)	-	-	48.44% (41,213)	-	-	-	-	-
March 13	New Hampshire (primary)	100.00% (9,716)	-	-	-	-	-	-	-	-
March 20	North Dakota (primary)	100.00% (10,822)	-	-	-	-	-	-	-	-
April 2	Michigan (primary)	98.27% (77,276)	0.41% (324)	-	1.32% (1,034)	-	-	-	-	-
April 3	Wisconsin (primary)	23.88% (W) (19,781)	73.76% (61,097)	-	0.65% (W) (541)	-	-	-	-	1.70% (W) (1,410)
April 10	Illinois (primary)	90.77% (W) (44,212)	7.77% (W) (3,786)	-	0.45% (W) (221)	-	-	-	-	1.01% (W) (490)
April 10	Nebraska (primary)	8.53% (W) (4,755)	-	-	-	91.48% (W) (51,019)	-	-	-	-
April 24	Ohio (primary)	64.89% (42,365)	-	-	-	-	21.38% (13,957)	12.15% (7,935)	-	-
April 28	Massachusetts (primary)	98.11% (W) (38,081)	-	-	0.65% (W) (254)	-	-	-	-	1.23% (W) (478)
May 1	California (primary)	55.74% (134,471)	24.87% (60,004)	-	19.39% (46,770)	-	-	-	-	-
May 7	Indiana (primary)	-	-	100.00% (146,934)	-	-	-	-	-	-
May 8	Alabama (primary)	-	-	-	-	-	-	-	100.00% (138,957)	-
May 15	New Jersey (primary)	99.03% (28,506)	0.31% (W) (88)	-	-	-	-	-	-	0.66% (W) (190)
May 18	Oregon (primary)	48.51% (17,444)	17.69% (6,360)	-	31.35% (11,272)	-	-	-	-	-
May 22	South Dakota (primary)	100.00% (6,221)	-	-	-	-	-	-	-	-
May 29	West Virginia (primary)	50.05% (81,739)	46.41% (75,796)	-	-	-	-	-	-	31.35% (11,272)
June 5	Florida (primary)	-	-	-	-	-	-	-	100.00% (108,167)	-

Legend:	1st place (popular vote)	2nd place (popular vote)	3rd place (popular vote)	Candidate has withdrawn or ceased campaigning	(W) - Votes are write-in

== See also ==
- Republican Party presidential primaries, 1928
- White primary
