= 1928 Republican National Convention =

American political convention

- 1928 presidential election
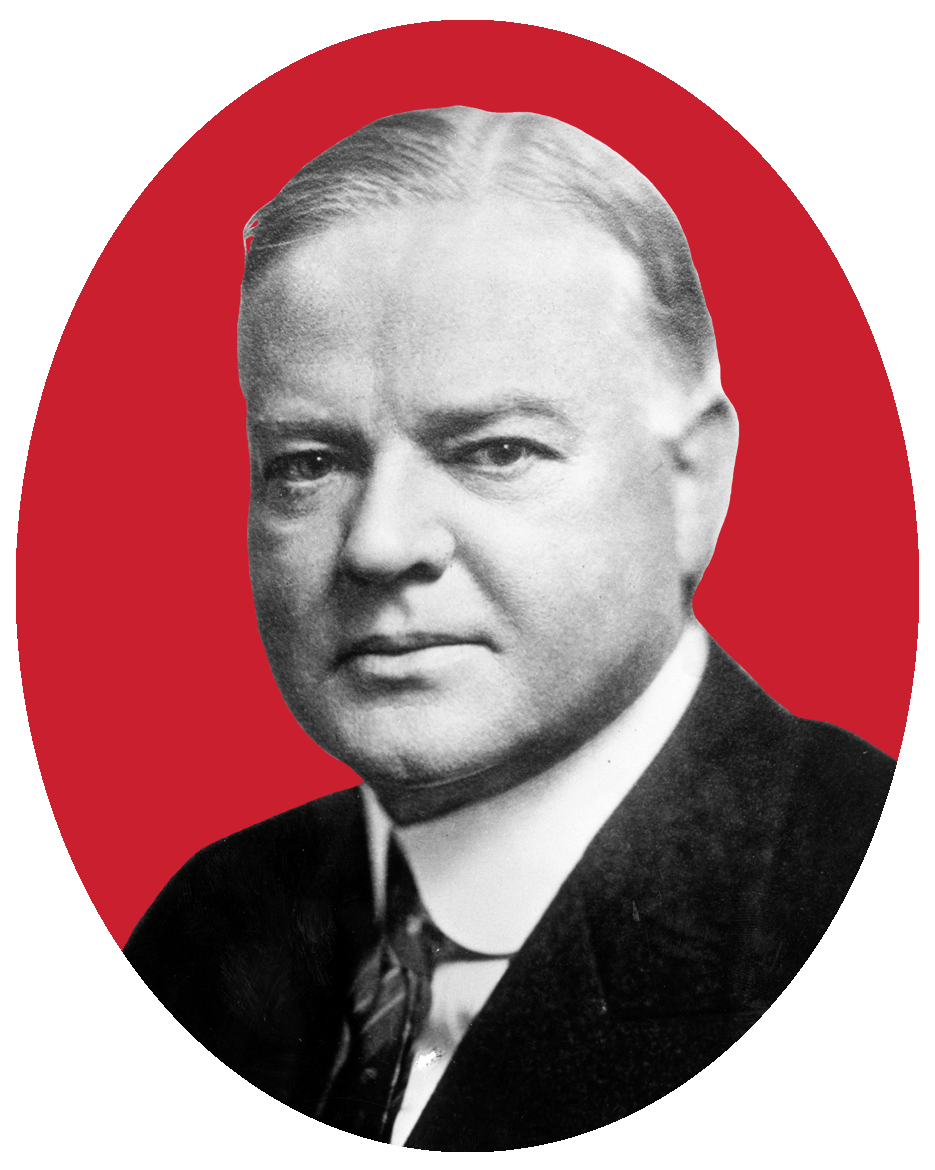
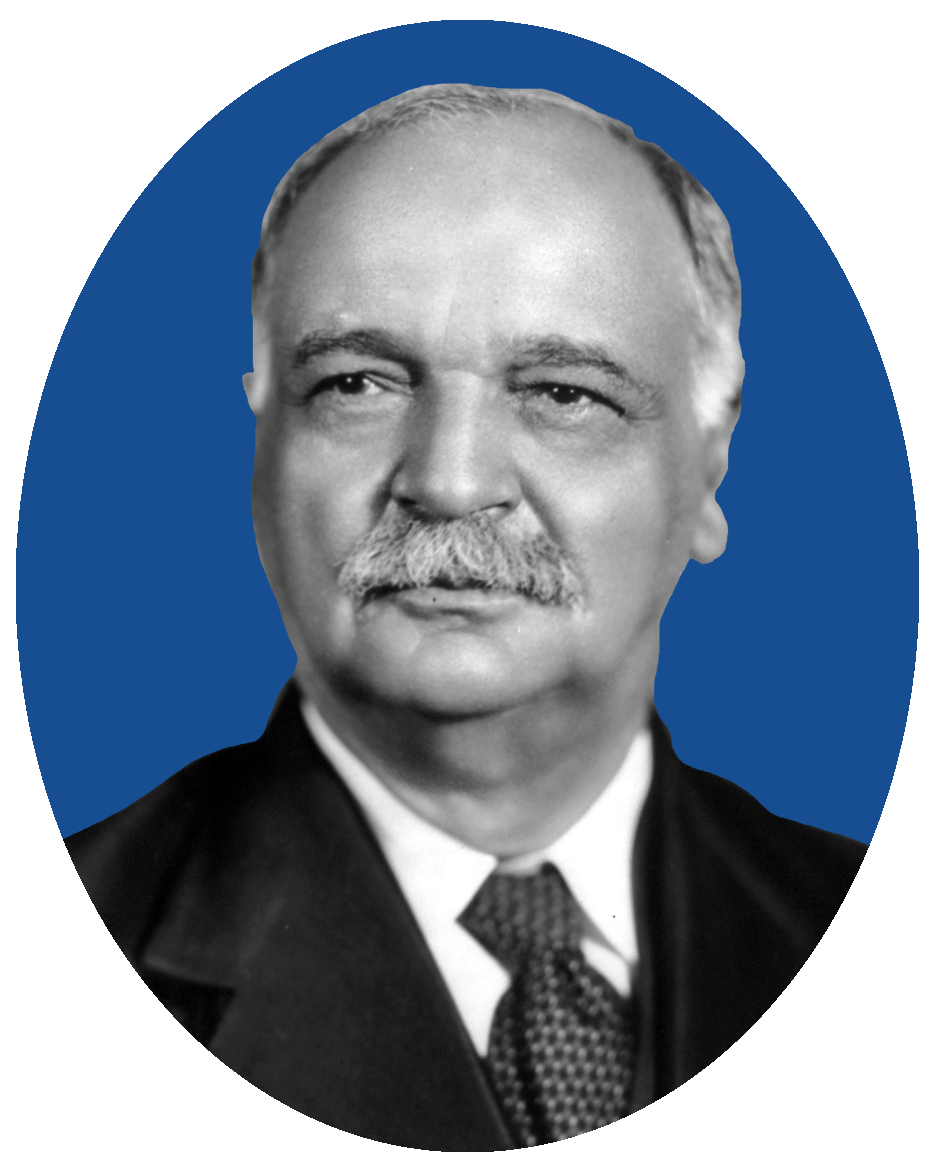
- Nominees; Hoover and Curtis

Convention
- Date(s): June 12–15, 1928
- City: Kansas City, Missouri
- Venue: Convention Hall

Candidates
- Presidential nominee: Herbert Hoover of California
- Vice-presidential nominee: Charles Curtis of Kansas

Voting
- Total delegates: 1,089
- Votes needed for nomination: 545
- Ballots: 1

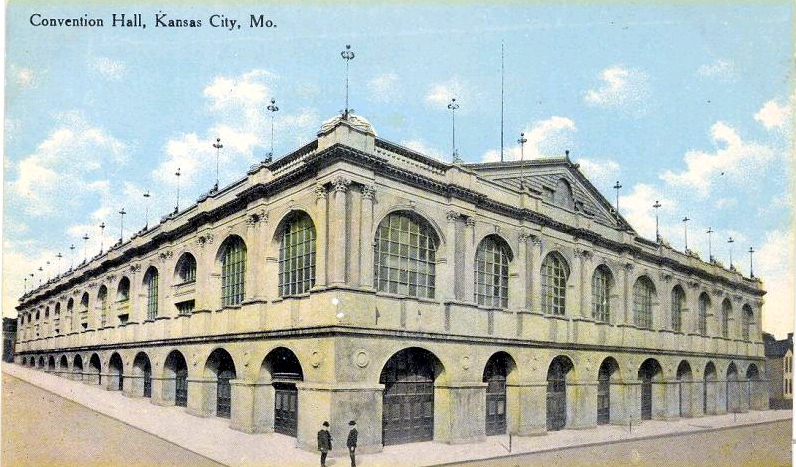
Convention Hall

The 1928 Republican National Convention was held at Convention Hall in Kansas City, Missouri, from June 12 to June 15, 1928.

Because President Calvin Coolidge had announced unexpectedly he would not run for re-election in 1928, Commerce Secretary Herbert Hoover became the natural front-runner for the Republican nomination. Former Illinois Governor Frank Lowden and Kansas Senator Charles Curtis were candidates for the nomination but stood no chance against the popular and accomplished Hoover. Chicago Mayor William Hale Thompson considered himself a candidate, but without the support of Ruth Hanna McCormick, his candidacy was unsuccessful.

Hoover was nominated on the first ballot with 837 votes to 72 for Lowden and 64 for Curtis and the rest scattered. John L. McNab delivered Hoover's nomination address. In his acceptance speech, Hoover said, "We in America today are nearer to the final triumph over poverty ever before in the history of any land." That and other optimistic remarks about the country's future were used against him in the 1932 election, which he lost to Franklin Roosevelt.

== Background ==
After Coolidge announced that "I do not choose to run" for a second full term in August 1927, Hoover emerged as the frontrunner. Illinois Governor Frank Lowden, Vice President Charles Dawes, and Senators James Eli Watson of Indiana, Charles Curtis of Kansas, Guy D. Goff of West Virginia, and Frank Willis of Ohio were potential challengers to Hoover.

Hoover had won respect by many for his work in the Wilson, Harding, and Coolidge administrations, but many party regulars distrusted his loyalty to the party on issues of both policy and patronage. Some progressive Republicans, such as California Senator Hiram Johnson, also disliked Hoover, but others, such as Senator William E. Borah, favored his candidacy. Many party leaders pressured Secretary of the Treasury Andrew Mellon to run, but at 73, Mellon felt that he was too old to run in 1928. Mellon sought to convince former Secretary of State and 1916 Republican nominee Charles Evans Hughes to run, but Hughes refused to campaign for the nomination.

== Platform ==
The platform praised the Coolidge administration for the prosperity of the mid-1920s, and promised reduction of the national debt, tax reduction, retention of the protective tariff, opposition of cancellation of foreign debts, settlement of claims from World War I from foreign governments, continuation of the Coolidge foreign policy, support of arbitration treaties, civil service protection, a tariff for agricultural protection and continued farm exports, aid to the coal-mining industry, continued appropriations for highway construction, the right to collective bargaining, regulation of railroads, a continued independent American merchant marine, government supervision of radio facilities, construction of waterways to help transportation of bulk goods, support for war veterans, federal regulation of public utilities, conservation, vigorous law enforcement, honest government, continued reclamation of arid lands in the West, improvement of air-mail service, restricted immigration and naturalization of foreign immigrants in America, continued enforcement of the Washington Naval Treaty, and continued territory status for Alaska and Hawaii, and called for more women in public service, authority for the President to draft defense material resources and services, creation of an Indian Commission, and an Anti-Lynching Law, and promised continued "Home Rule for the American Citizen".

Hoover's forces won an early victory by securing adoption of an agricultural plank which endorsed President Coolidge's position on the question and rejected all principles of the McNary–Haugen Farm Relief Bill. Former Governor Lowden caused a sensation by announcing that since the agricultural plank was unsatisfactory, he withdrew from consideration as presidential nominee.

== Presidential nomination ==
=== Presidential candidates ===
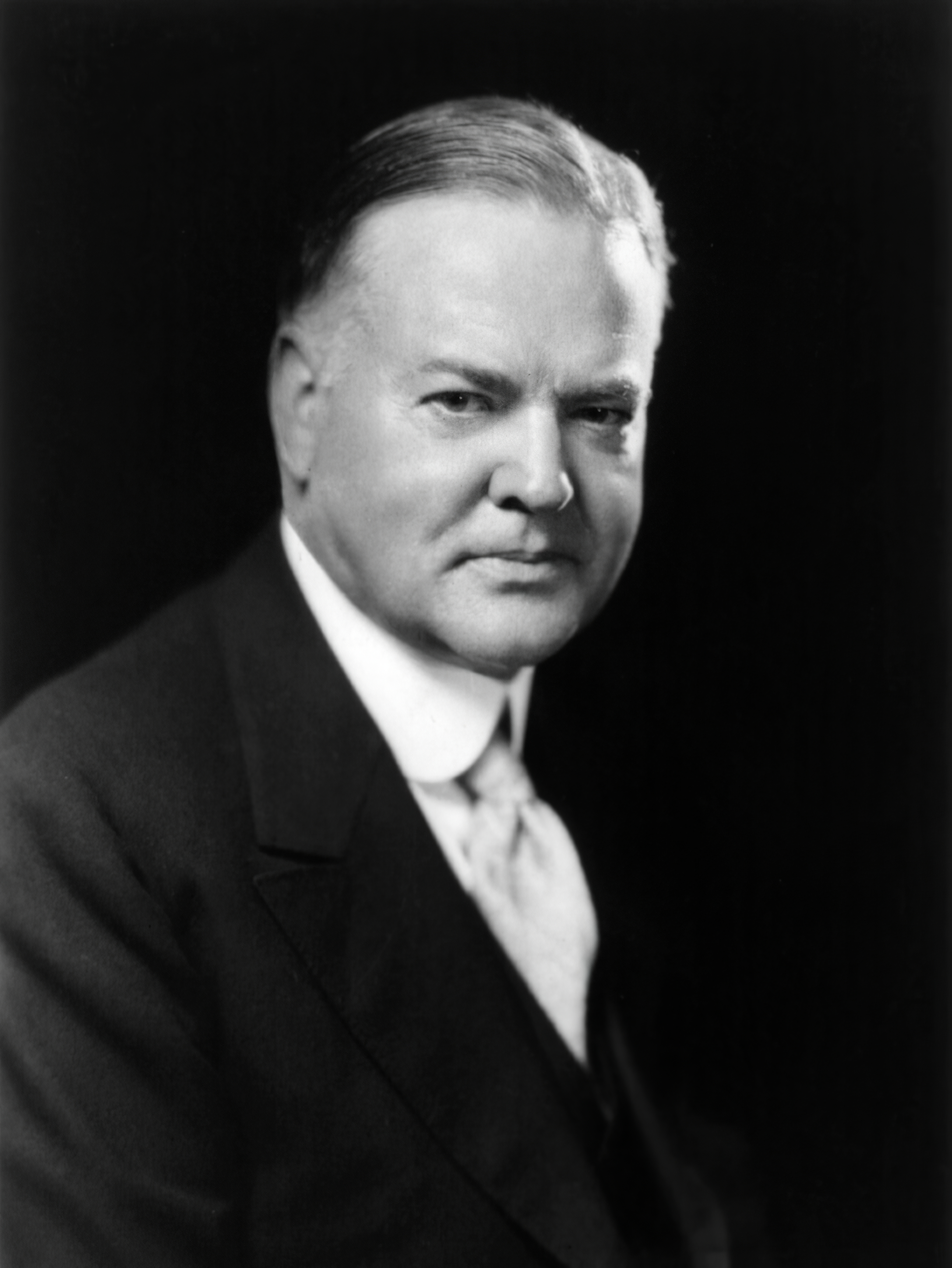
Commerce Secretary
Herbert Hoover
of California

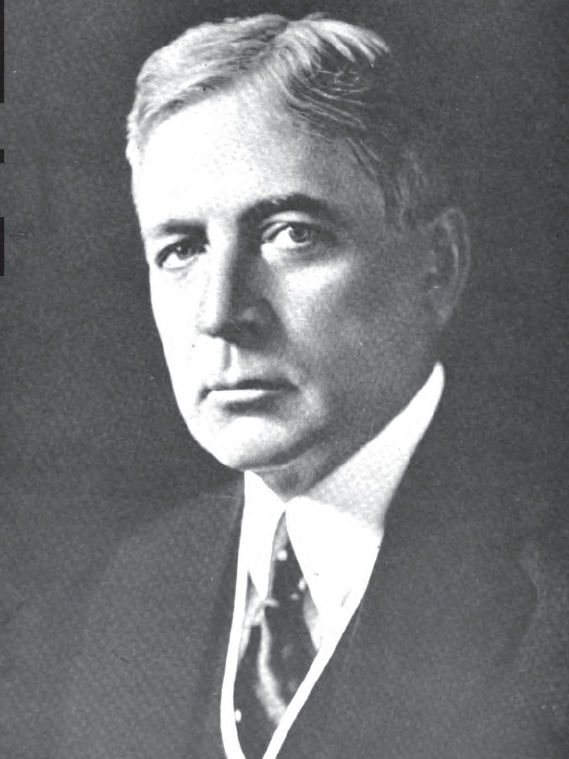
Former Governor
Frank O. Lowden
of Illinois
(Withdrew)

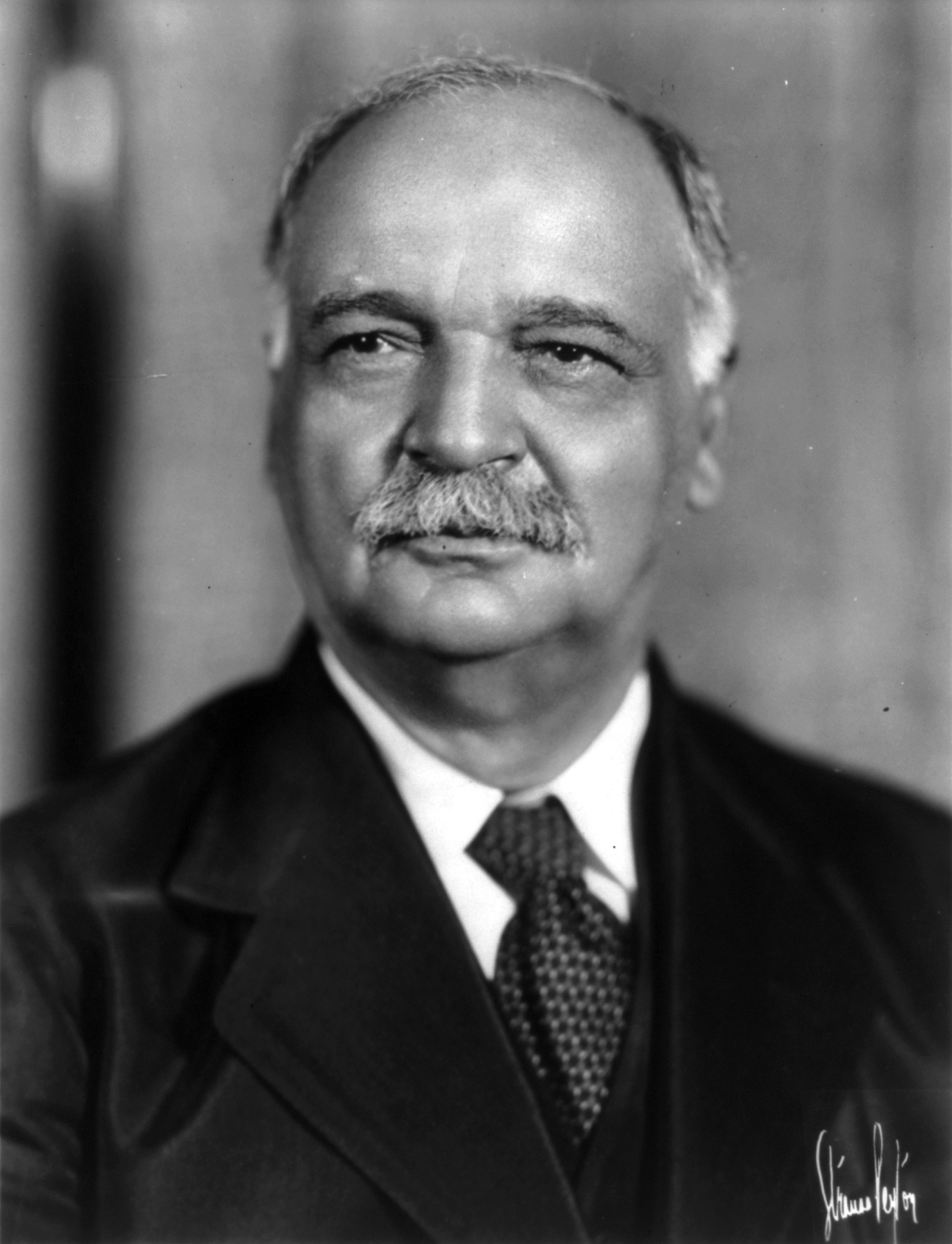
Senate Majority Leader
Charles Curtis
of Kansas

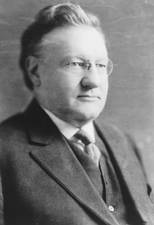
Senator
James E. Watson
of Indiana

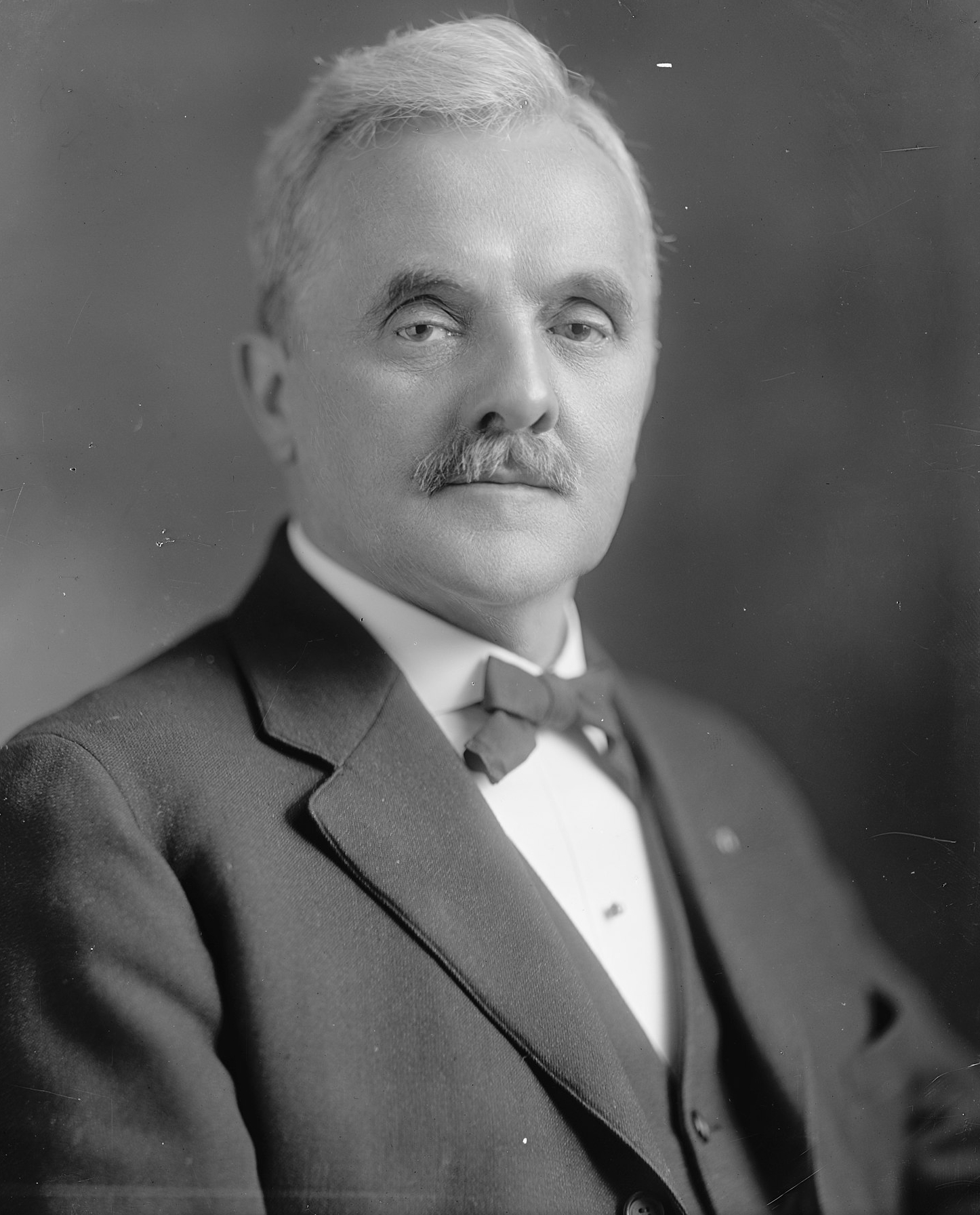
Senator
George W. Norris
of Nebraska

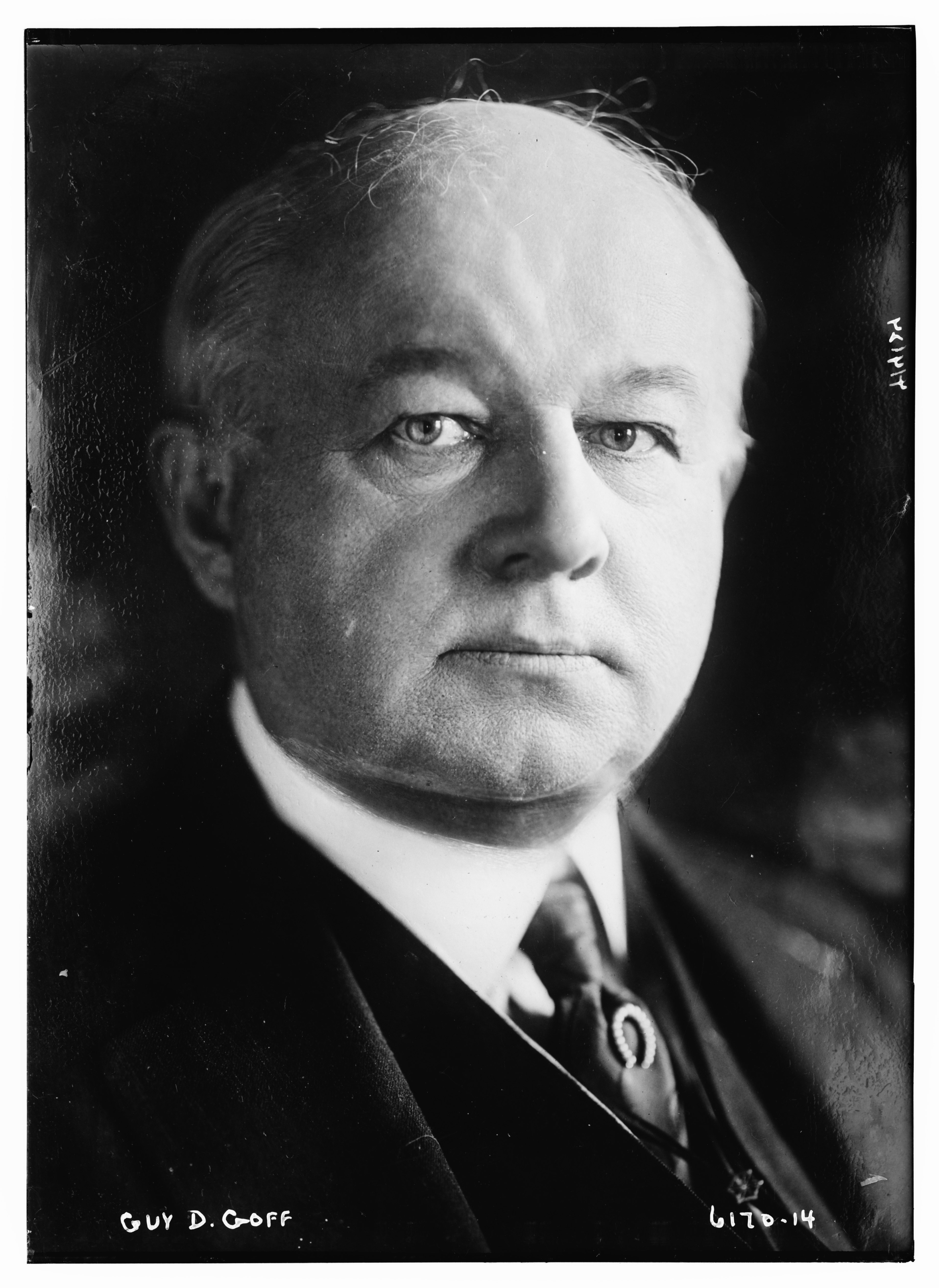
Senator
Guy D. Goff
of West Virginia

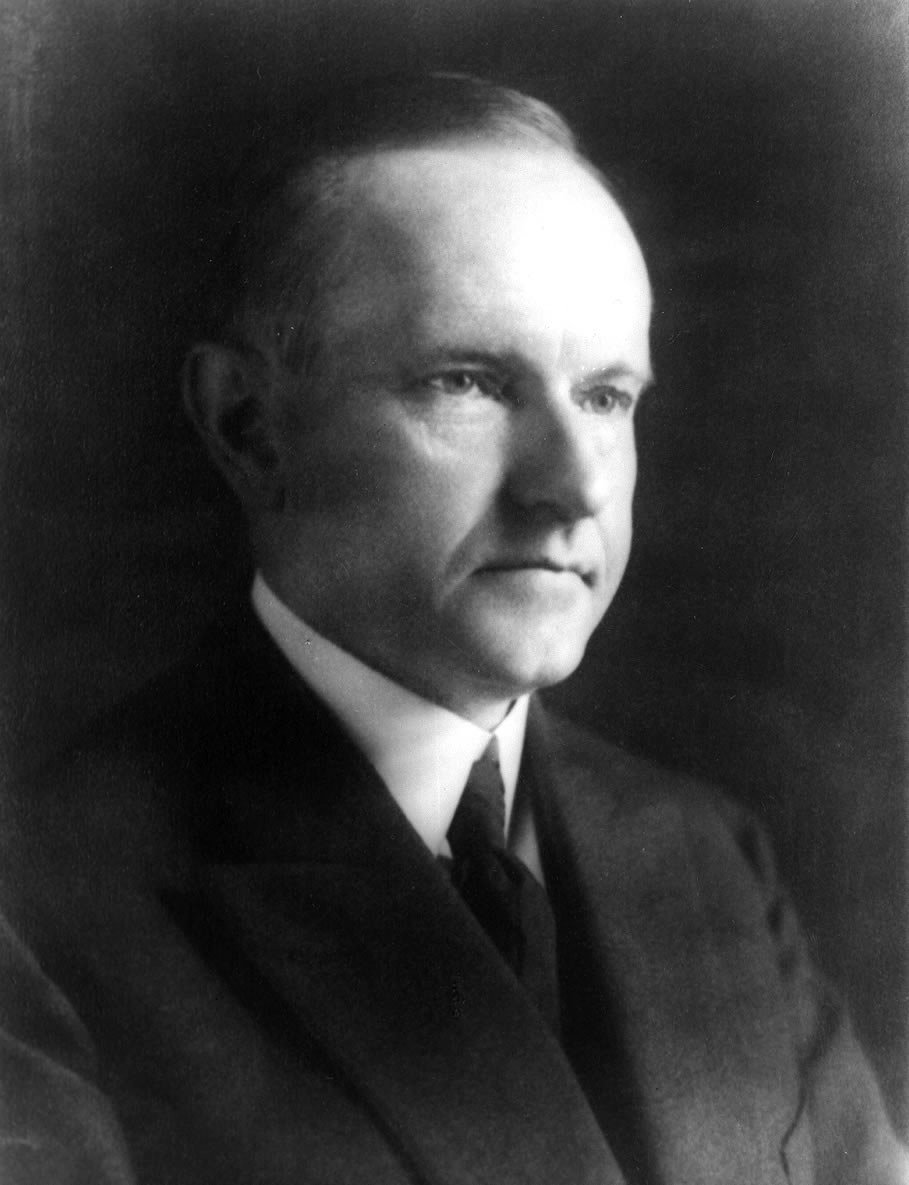
President
Calvin Coolidge
of Massachusetts
(Declined Consideration)

Party leaders wanted Coolidge to run again, and he would have easily been nominated. He sent Secretary to the President Everett Sanders to the convention to tell leaders of state delegations to vote for anyone else. With no strong alternative, Hoover appeared to be the likely nominee at the start of the convention, but many in the party still opposed his candidacy. A "draft Coolidge" movement emerged, but the movement collapsed after William S. Vare, political boss of Philadelphia, unexpectedly supported Hoover. Coolidge remained silent, refusing to tell even the delegation from the president's home state of Vermont whether to support the draft. Curtis sought supporters of Hoover's rivals for his own candidacy. However, Hoover won the nomination on the first ballot.

Presidential Ballot
Candidate	1st	Unanimous
Hoover	837	1,089
Lowden	74	
Curtis	64	
Watson	45	
Norris	24	
Goff	18	
Coolidge	17	
Dawes	4	
Hughes	1	
Not Voting	5	

Presidential Balloting / 3rd Day of Convention (June 14, 1928)

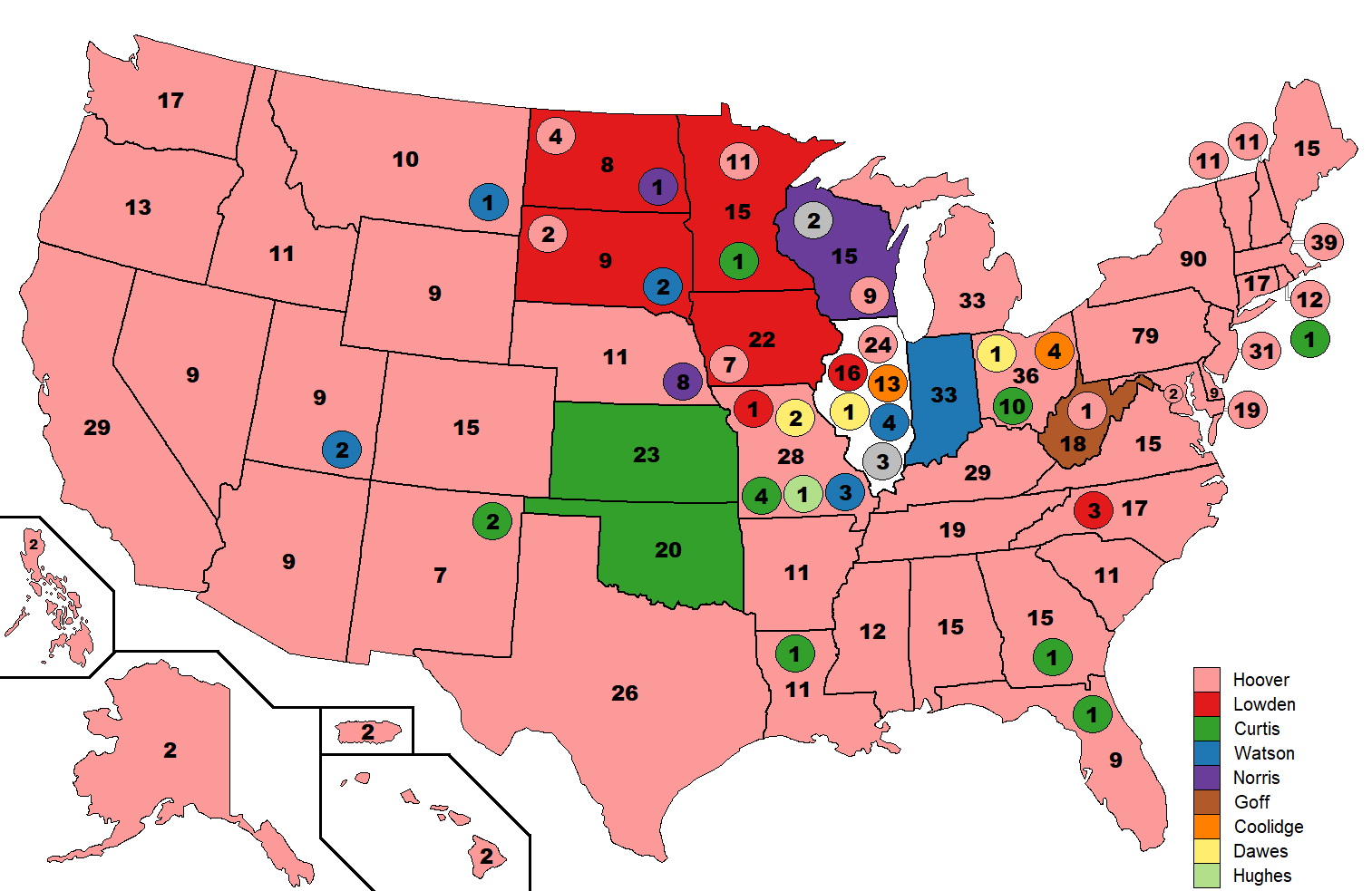
1st Presidential Ballot

States	Total delegates	Hoover	Watson	Lowden	Curtis	Coolidge	Hughes	Dawes	Norris	Goff	Absent
Alabama	15	15									
Arizona	9	9									
Arkansas	11	11									
California	29	29									
Colorado	15	15									
Connecticut	17	17									
Delaware	9	9									
Florida	10	9			1						
Georgia	16	15			1						
Idaho	11	11									
Illinois	61	24	4	16		13		1			3
Indiana	33		33								
Iowa	29	7		22							
Kansas	23				23						
Kentucky	29	29									
Louisiana	12	11			1						
Maine	15	15									
Maryland	19	19									
Massachusetts	39	39									
Michigan	33	33									
Minnesota	27	11		15	1						
Mississippi	12	12									
Missouri	39	28	3	1	4		1	2			
Montana	11	10	1								
Nebraska	19	11							8		
Nevada	9	9									
New Hampshire	11	11									
New Jersey	31	31									
New Mexico	9	7			2						
New York	90	90									
North Carolina	20	17		3							
North Dakota	13	4		8					1		
Ohio	51	36			10	4		1			
Oklahoma	20				20						
Oregon	13	13									
Pennsylvania	79	79									
Rhode Island	13	12			1						
South Carolina	11	11									
South Dakota	13	2	2	9							
Tennessee	19	19									
Texas	26	26									
Utah	11	9	2								
Vermont	11	11									
Virginia	15	15									
Washington	17	17									
West Virginia	19	1								18	
Wisconsin	26	9							15		2
Wyoming	9	9									
Alaska	2	2									
District of Columbia	2	2									
Hawaii	2	2									
Philippines	2	2									
Puerto Rico	2	2									
Total	1089	837	45	74	64	17	1	4	24	18	5

== Vice Presidential nomination ==
=== Vice Presidential candidates ===
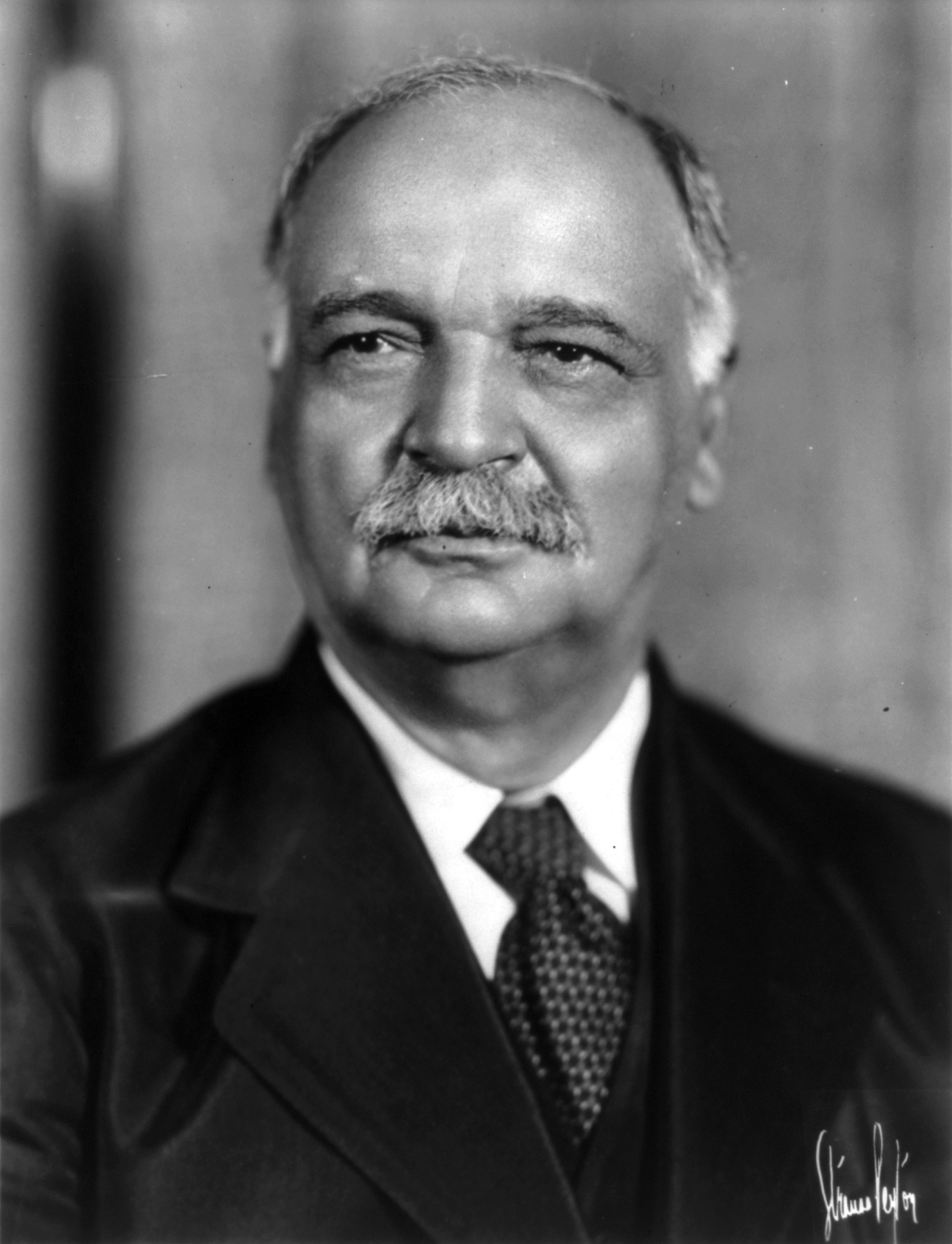
Senate Majority Leader
Charles Curtis
of Kansas

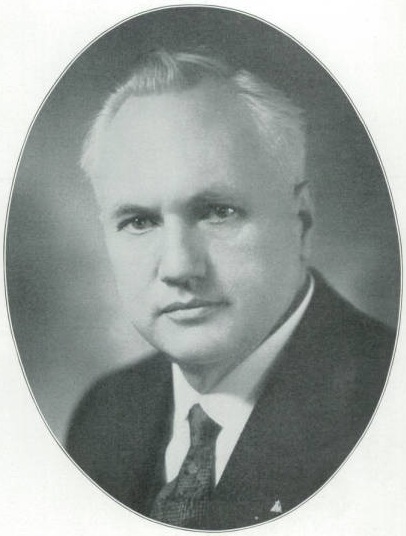
Governor
Sam Aaron Baker
of Missouri
(Withdrew)

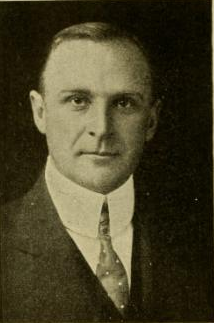
Governor
Alvan T. Fuller
of Massachusetts
(Withdrew)

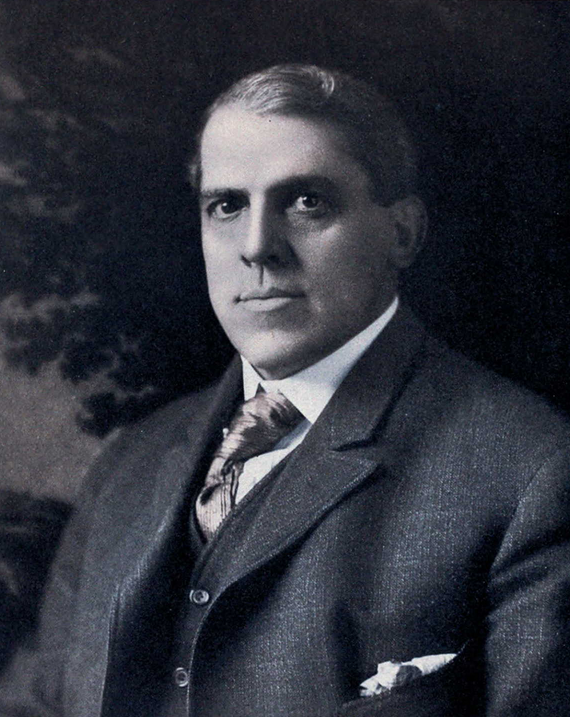
Former Governor
Chase Osborn
of Michigan
(Withdrew)

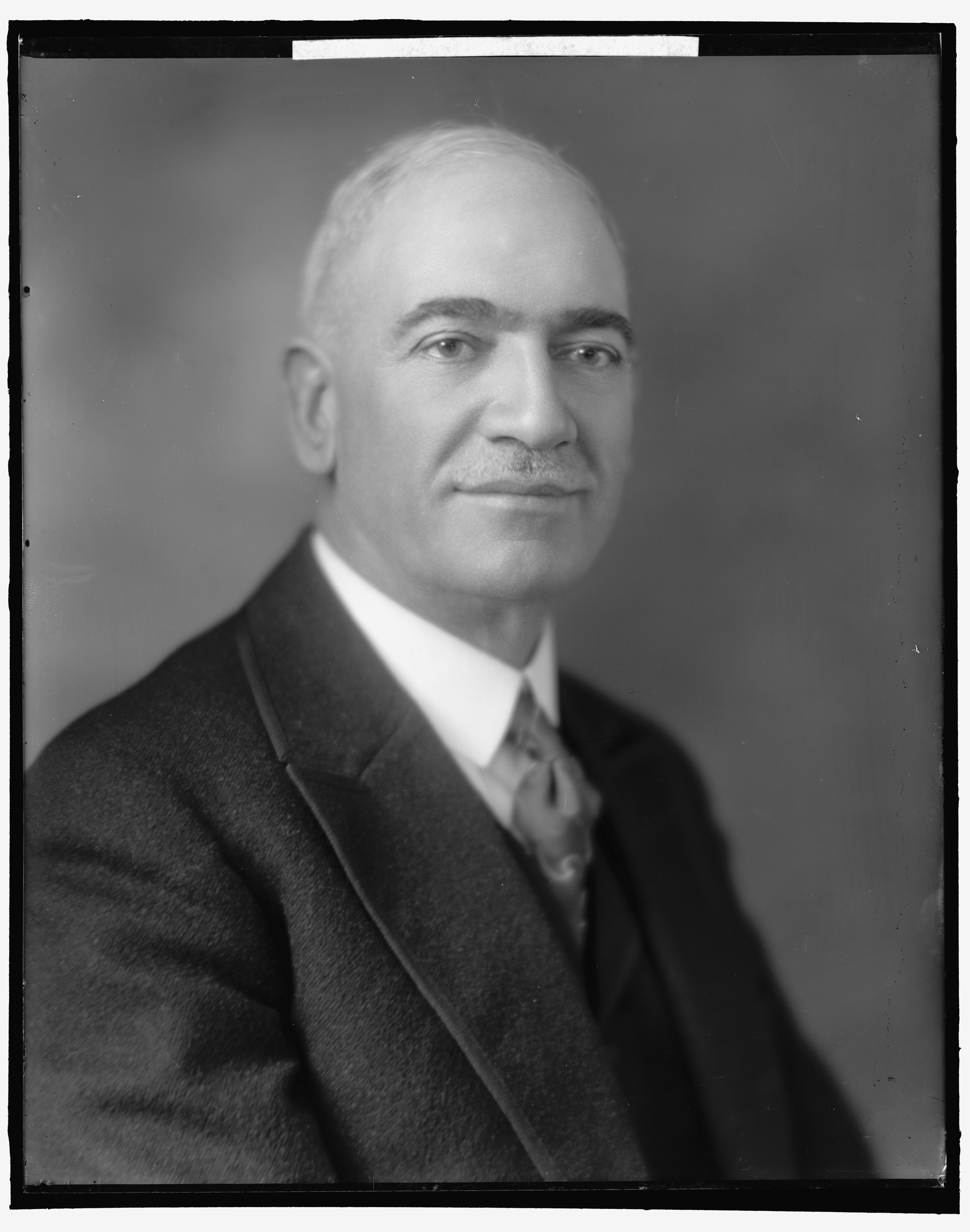
House Majority Leader
John Q. Tilson
of Connecticut
(Withdrew)

At the start of the convention, Vice President Charles G. Dawes was perhaps the most likely running mate for Hoover. Other possibilities included former Kansas Governor Henry Justin Allen, New Jersey Senator Walter Edge, New Hampshire Senator George H. Moses, Connecticut Representative John Q. Tilson, and Ambassador Alanson B. Houghton. Curtis was also a possibility, but he was not yet ready to concede the presidential nomination to Hoover.

After Hoover won the presidential nomination, Moses, Illinois Senator Charles S. Deneen, and former Massachusetts Governor Channing Cox were named as the most likely vice-presidential nominees, with a re-nomination for Dawes also a possibility. Party leaders considered nominating Cox or Dawes, but Cox was vetoed by Utah Senator Reed Smoot, and Dawes was unacceptable to Hoover and Coolidge for supporting McNary-Haugen.

The convention turned to the farm vote in hopes of placating them for the unfavorably received farm relief plank. Curtis' name was entered by Senator Borah and his nomination was practically assured since the Lion of Idaho and other westerners had issued an ultimatum that a westerner must hold the vice presidency to placate the farmers. The Senate Majority Leader voted for the McNary-Haugen Bill which President Coolidge vetoed, but had refused to vote to override the veto of that measure. Curtis, possibly with the support of Coolidge, was nominated by the party leaders, and the convention ratified the choice.

Vice Presidential Ballot
Candidate	1st	Unanimous
Curtis	1,052	1,089
Ekern	19	
Dawes	13	
MacNider	2	
Not Voting	3	

Vice Presidential Balloting / 4th Day of Convention (June 15, 1928)

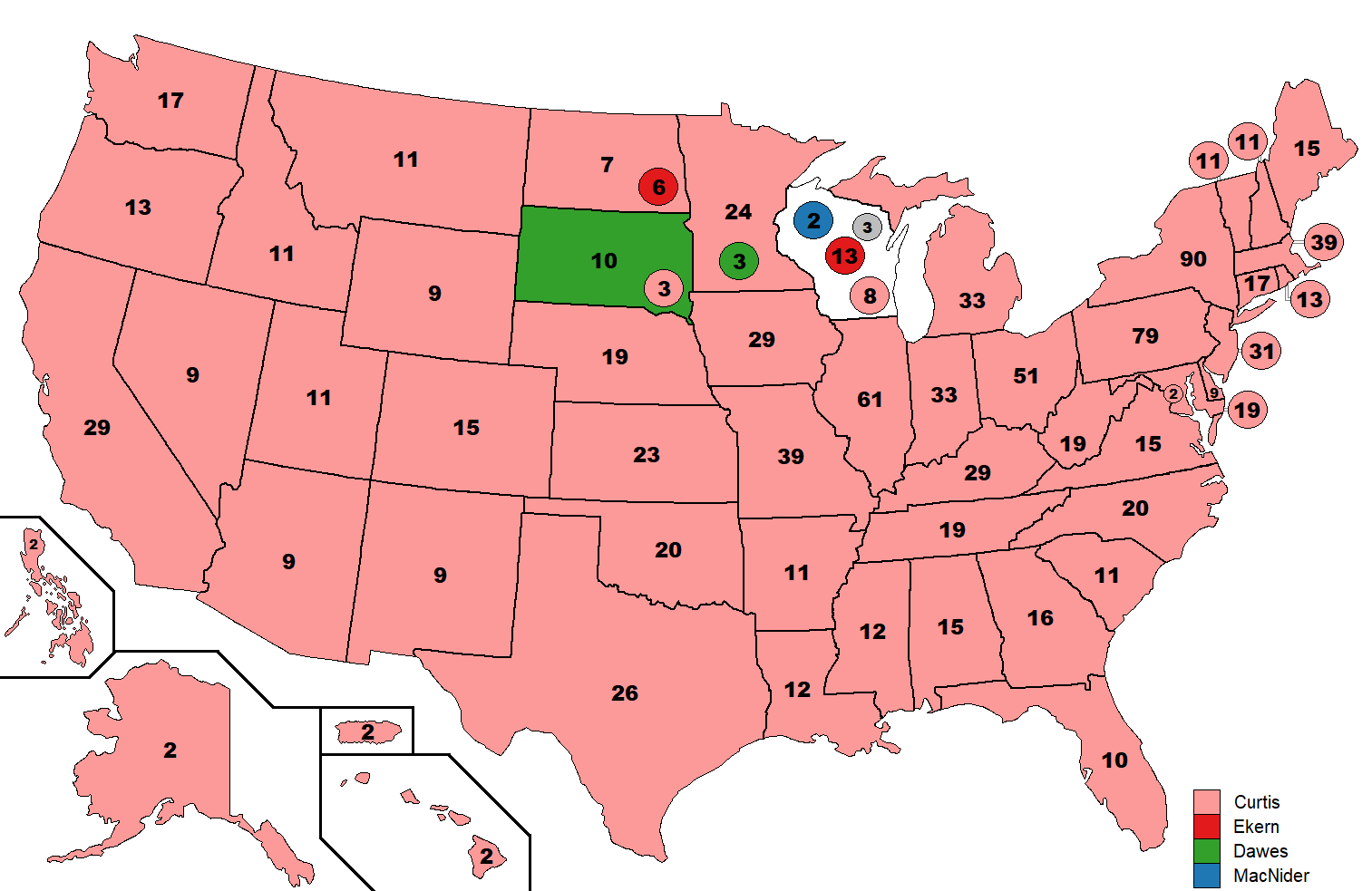
1st
Vice Presidential Ballot

== Prayers ==
Each of the four days of the convention opened with a lengthy invocation by a different clergymen—one Jewish, one Catholic, one Episcopalian, one Methodist. Together, these four religious groups formed a majority of Americans at the time.

All of the clergy were based in Missouri, where the convention was held. Each was listed among the convention officers as an official chaplain.

On June 12, the opening prayer was given by Bishop S. C. Partridge of the Episcopal Diocese of West Missouri. Speakers on the second through fourth days were Catholic Bishop Thomas F. Lillis of the Diocese of Kansas City, Rabbi Herman M. Cohen of Congregation Keneseth Israel-Beth Sholom, Kansas City, and Bishop E. L. Waldorf of the Methodist Episcopal Diocese of Kansas City.

== See also ==
- History of the United States Republican Party
- List of Republican National Conventions
- United States presidential nominating convention
- 1928 Republican Party presidential primaries
- 1928 United States presidential election
- 1928 Democratic National Convention

Preceded by 1924; Cleveland, Ohio	Republican National Conventions	Succeeded by 1932; Chicago, Illinois
