= 1928 Republican Party presidential primaries =

Selection of Republican US presidential candidate

- March 6 to May 18, 1928
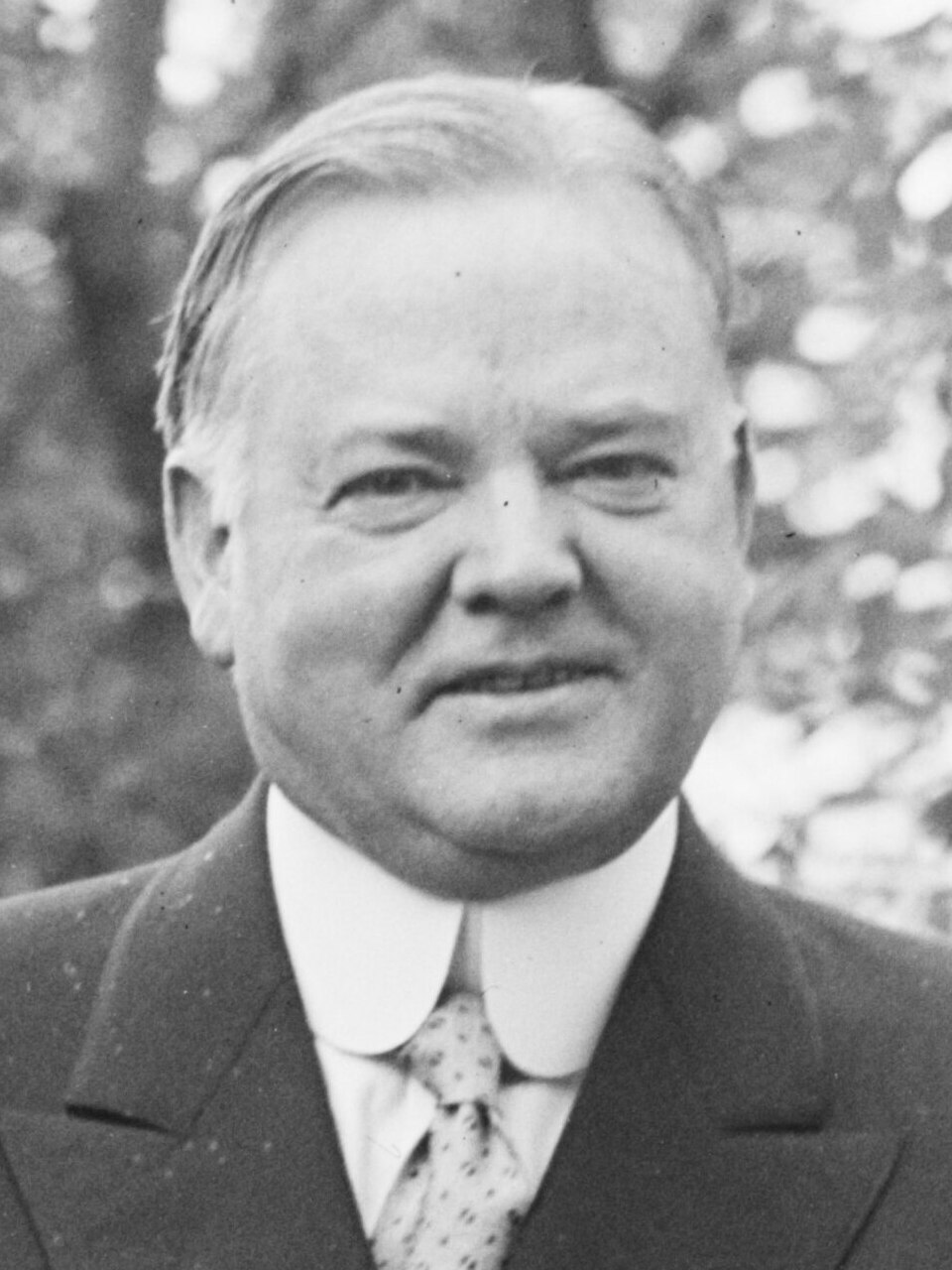

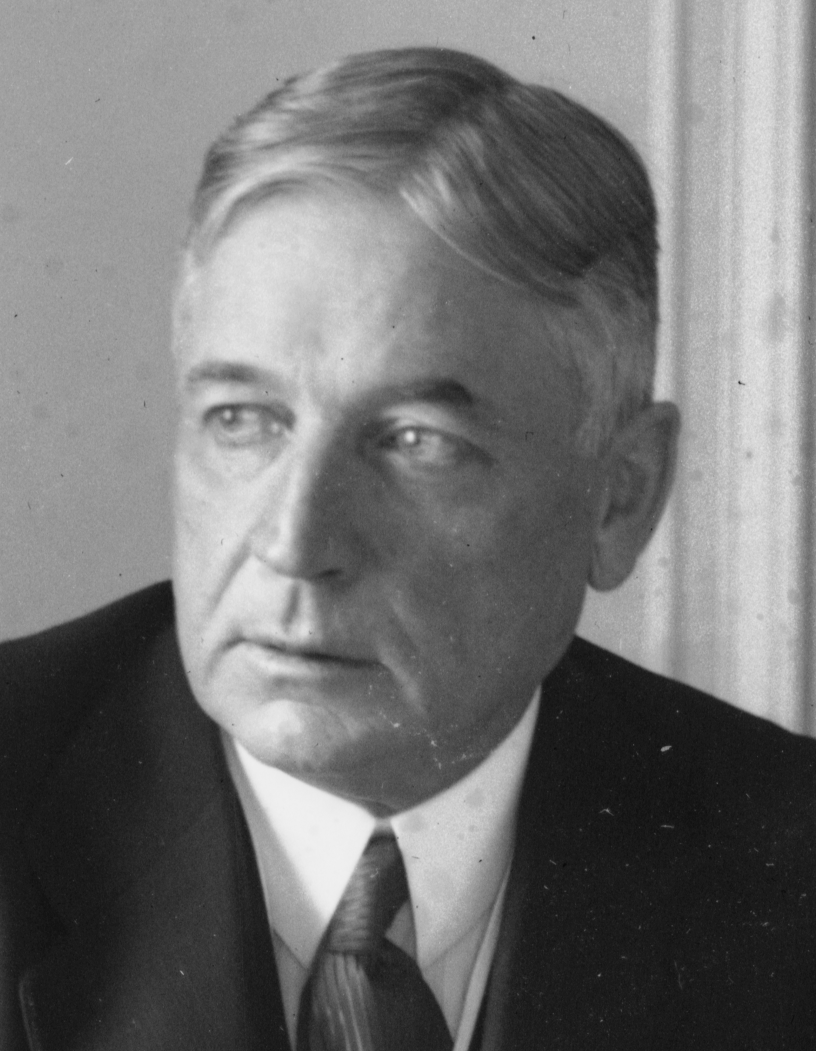

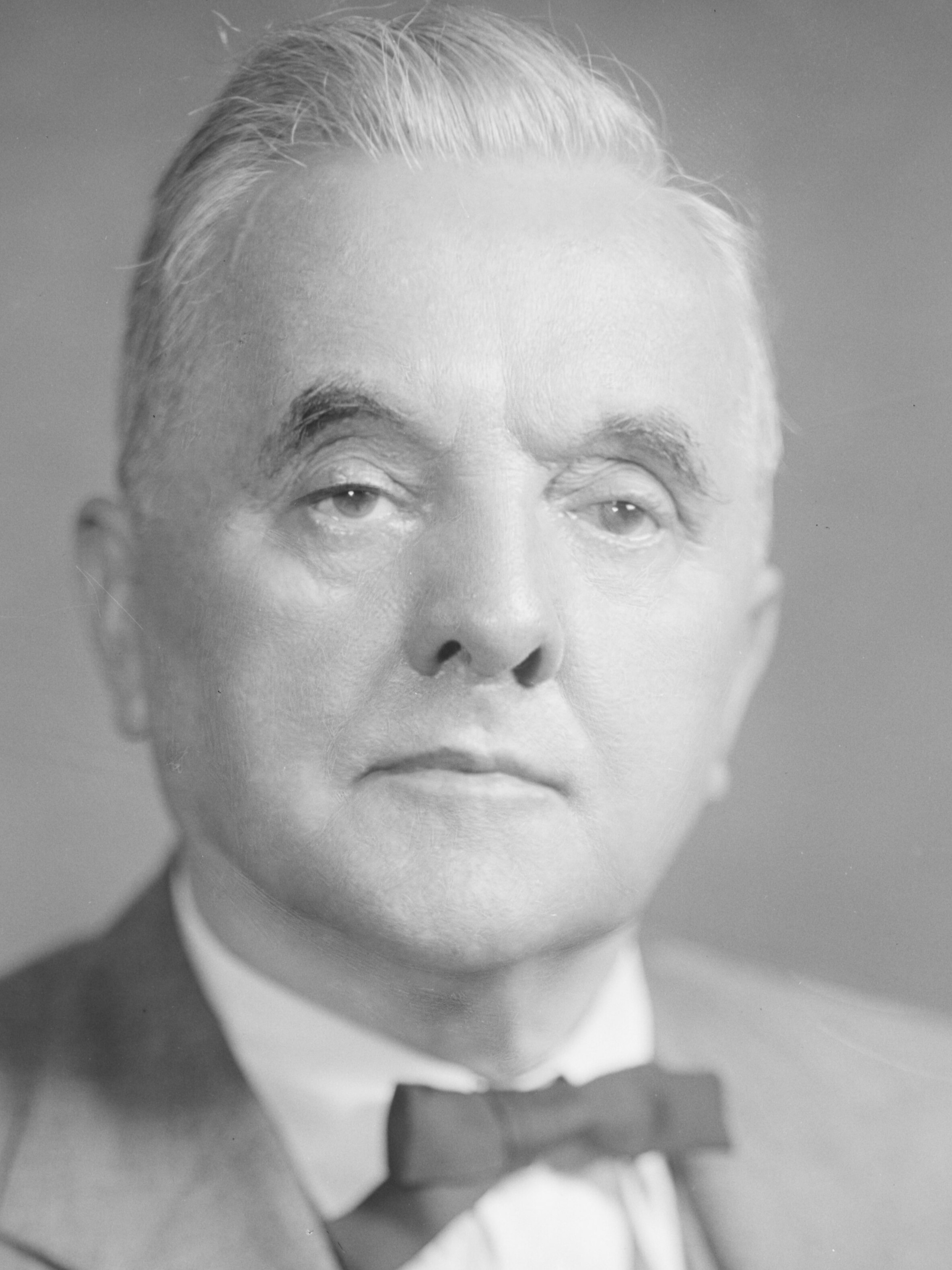

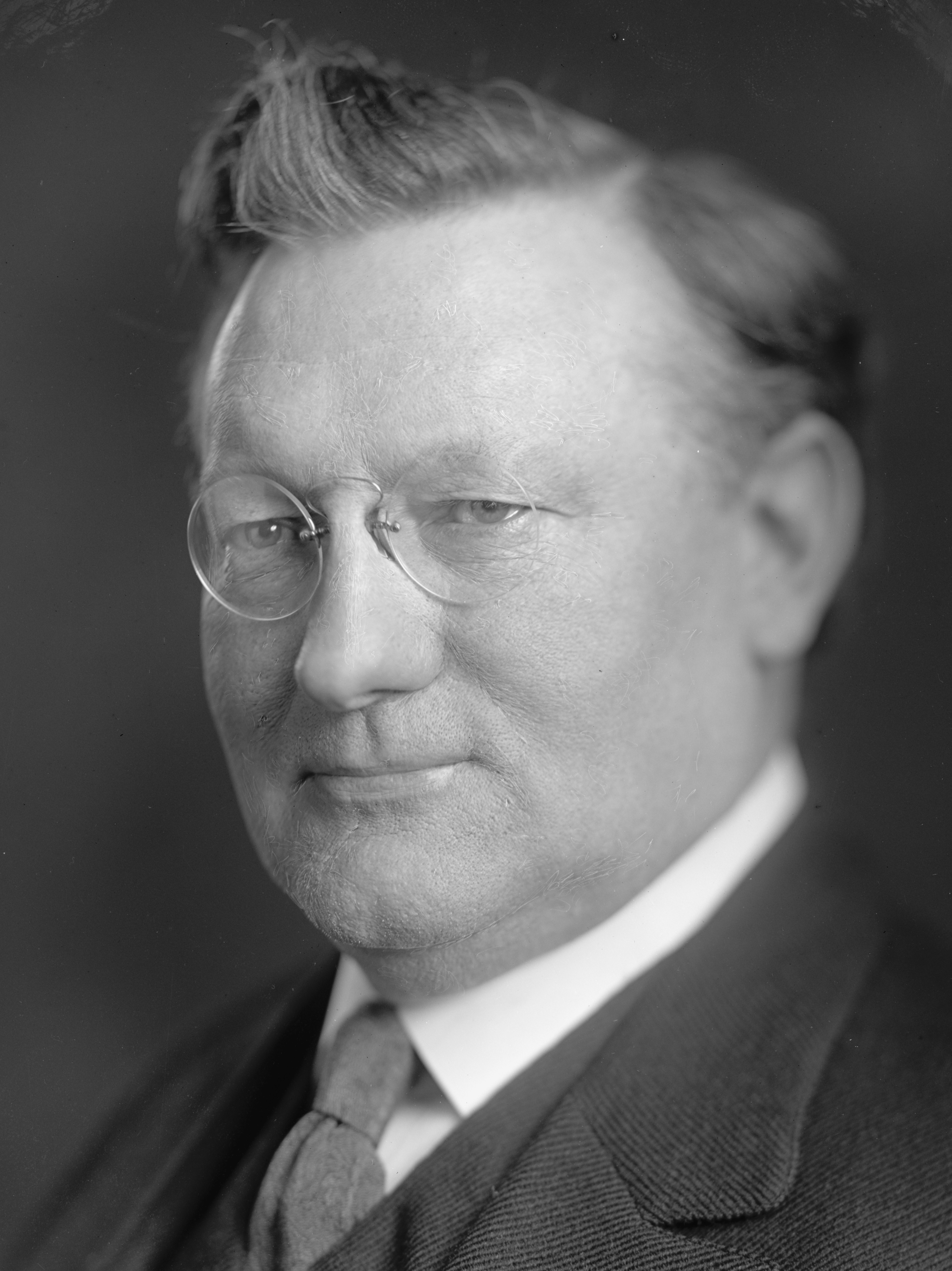

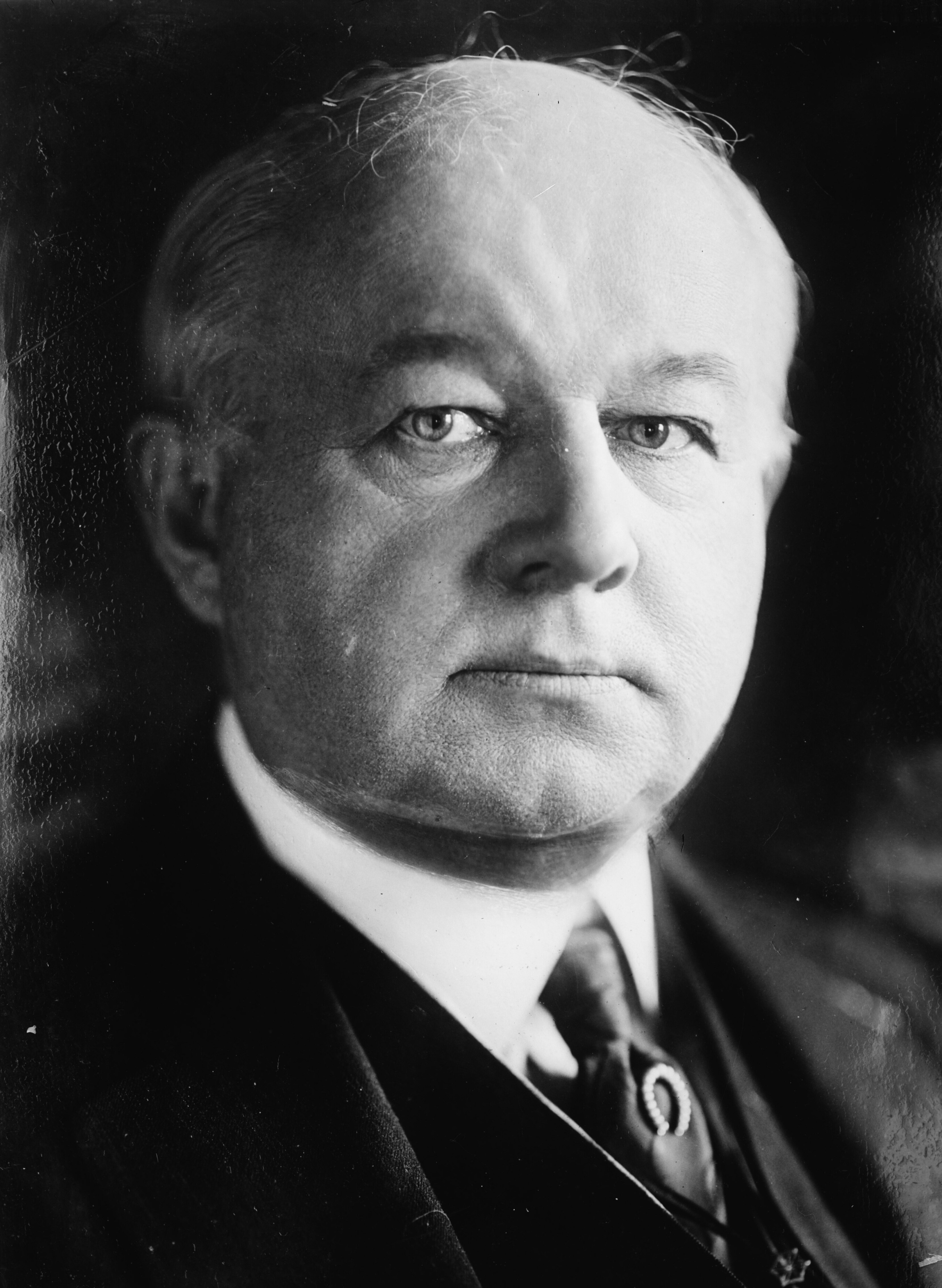
Candidate	Herbert C. Hoover	Frank O. Lowden	George W. Norris
Home state	California	Illinois	Nebraska
Contests won	8	2	2
Popular vote	2,020,235	1,283,535	259,548
Percentage	49.2%	31.2%	6.3%
Candidate	James E. Watson	Guy D. Goff
Home state	Indiana	West Virginia
Contests won	1	1
Popular vote	228,795	128,429
Percentage	5.6%	3.1%
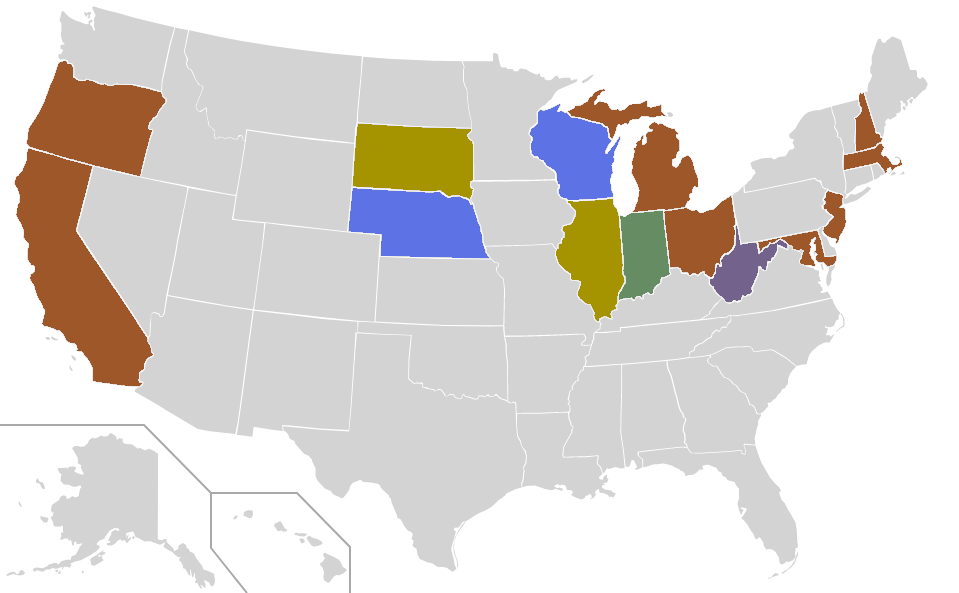
- First place finishes by preference primary results
Previous Republican nominee
Calvin Coolidge
Republican nominee
Herbert Hoover

From March 6 to May 18, 1928, voters of the Republican Party chose its nominee for president in the 1928 United States presidential election. The nominee was selected through a series of primary elections and caucuses culminating in the 1928 Republican National Convention held from June 12 to June 15, 1928, in Kansas City, Missouri.

== Candidates ==
=== Nominee ===
Candidate	Experience	Home state	Campaign	Popular vote	Contests won	Running mate
Herbert Hoover	U.S. Secretary of Commerce (1921–1928) Director of the U.S. Food Administration (1917–1918) Chairman of the Belgian Relief (1914–1917)	California	(Campaign • Positions); Secured nomination: June 12, 1928	2,020,235 (49.2%)	8	Charles Curtis

=== Withdrew during convention ===
Candidate	Most recent position	Home state	Campaign	Delegates on first ballot	Contests won
Frank O. Lowden	Governor of Illinois (1917–1921) U.S. Representative from IL-13 (1906–1911)	Illinois	Defeated at convention: June 12, 1928	—	2
Charles Curtis	U.S. Senator from Kansas (1915–1929, 1907-1913) U.S. Representative from Kansas (1893-1907)	Kansas	Defeated at convention: June 12, 1928 (nominated for vice president)	—	—
James E. Watson	U.S. Senator from Indiana (1916–1933) U.S. Representative from Indiana (1895-1897, 1899-1909)	Indiana	Defeated at convention: June 12, 1928	—	1
George W. Norris	U.S. Senator from Nebraska (1913–1943) U.S. Representative from NE-05 (1903-1913)	Nebraska	Defeated at convention: June 12, 1928	—	2

=== Did not run ===
- Former Secretary of State and 1916 nominee Charles Evans Hughes of New York
- Secretary of the Treasury Andrew Mellon of Pennsylvania
- President of the United States Calvin Coolidge

=== Favorite sons ===
The following candidates stood for nomination in their home states for the purpose of controlling their delegate slate at the convention. They did not receive the first-ballot support of delegates in more than two other states or territories.

- Senator Guy D. Goff of West Virginia

== See also ==
- 1928 Democratic Party presidential primaries
