= Nebraska Legislature 36th district =

American legislative district

Nebraska's 36th legislative district
- Map of Nebraska Legislature districts with the 36th district shaded in red
Senator
Rick Holdcroft; R–Bellevue
since 2023
- Demographics: 88% White; 1.6% Black; 4.5% Hispanic; 2.1% Asian; 0.3% Native American
- Population (2020): 40,589

The Nebraska Legislature's 36th district is one of the 49 legislative districts in the Nebraska Legislature. The district is located in eastern Nebraska and covers southwestern Sarpy County. The area of Sarpy County it covers includes small sections of Papillion and Bellevue, as well as all of Gretna and Springfield. It also includes many unincorporated suburbs as well as rural areas. Rick Holdcroft has represented the district since 2023.

== Demographics ==
The US Census Bureau recorded the population as of 2020 at 40,589.

- 88% of the district is White.
- 4.5% of the district is Hispanic.
- 2.1% of the district is Asian.
- 1.6% of the district is Black.
- 0.3% of the district is Native American.

== List of senators ==
Senator	Party	Years of service	Legislature	Residence
Rick Holdcroft	Republican	2023 - present	108th-109th	Bellevue
Matt Williams	Republican	2015-2023	104th-107th	Gothenburg
John Wightman	Republican	2007-2015	100th-103rd	Lexington
Jim D. Cudaback	Republican	1991-2007	92nd-99th	Riverdale
Lorraine Langford	Republican	1987-1991	90th-91st	Kearney
Ray E. Lundy	Democratic	1983-1987	88th-89th	Kearney
Ron Cope	Republican	1975-1983	84th-87th	Kearney
Gerald Stromer	Republican	1971-1975	82nd-83rd	Kearney
Leslie Robinson	Republican	1967-1971	77th-81st	Kearney
