= Senator Robinson =

Senator Robinson may refer to:

== Members of the United States Senate ==
- Arthur Raymond Robinson (1881–1961), U.S. Senator from Indiana from 1925 to 1935
- John McCracken Robinson (1794–1843), U.S. Senator from Illinois from 1830 to 1841
- Jonathan Robinson (American politician) (1756–1819), U.S. Senator from Vermont from 1807 to 1815
- Joseph Taylor Robinson (1872–1937), U.S. Senator from Arkansas from 1913 to 1937
- Moses Robinson (1741–1813), U.S. Senator from Vermont from 1791 to 1796

== United States state senate members ==
- Albert Robinson (Kentucky politician) (1938–2024), Kentucky State Senate
- Ben Robinson (politician) (fl. 1980s–present), Oklahoma State Senat
- Bud Robinson (1928–2011), Nebraska State Senate
- Charles L. Robinson (1818–1894), Kansas State Senate
- Dan Robinson (politician) (1926–2022), North Carolina Senate
- Devlin Robinson (fl. 2020s), Pennsylvania State Senate
- Edward Robinson (Maine politician) (1796–1857), Maine State Senate
- Frederick Robinson (Massachusetts politician) (1799–1882), Massachusetts State Senate
- George D. Robinson (1834–1896), Massachusetts State Senate
- Gladys A. Robinson (born 1949), North Carolina State Senate
- Helen Ring Robinson (1878–1923), Colorado State Senate
- Ira E. Robinson (1869–1951), West Virginia State Senate
- J. Kenneth Robinson (1916–1990), Virginia State Senate
- James Fisher Robinson (1800–1882), Kentucky State Senate
- John Buchanan Robinson (1846–1933), Pennsylvania State Senate
- John S. Robinson (governor) (1804–1860), Vermont State Senate
- John Robinson (Virginia politician, born 1822) (1822–1900), Virginia State Senate
- Katrina Robinson (born 1981), Tennessee State Senate
- Larry Robinson (politician) (1949–2025), North Dakota State Senate
- Lee Robinson (politician) (1943–2015), Georgia State Senate
- Leslie Robinson (politician) (1906–1997), Nebraska State Senate
- Michael Waller Robinson (1837–1912), Illinois State Senate
- Milton S. Robinson (1832–1892), Indiana State Senate
- Orrin W. Robinson (politician) (1834–1907), Michigan State Senate
- Rix Robinson (1792–1875), Michigan State Senate
- Robert P. Robinson (Wisconsin politician) (1884–1953), Wisconsin State Senate
- Shannon Robinson (born 1948), New Mexico State Senate
- Theodore Douglas Robinson (1883–1934), New York State Senate
- Thomas J. B. Robinson (1868–1958), Iowa State Senate
