= Senator Langford =

Senator Langford may refer to:

- Arthur Langford Jr. (1949–1994), Georgia State Senate
- Charles Langford (1922–2007), Alabama State Senate
- James Beverly Langford (1922–1996), Georgia State Senate
- Lorraine Langford (1923–1998), Nebraska State Senate
