= 1928 Democratic National Convention =

U.S. political event held in Houston, Texas

- 1928 presidential election
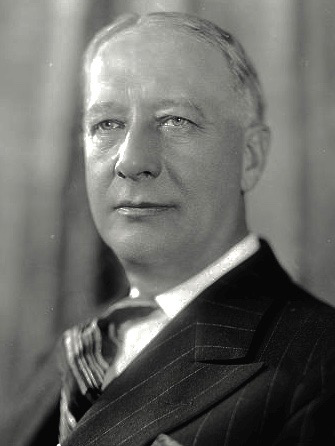
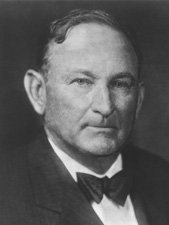
- Nominees; Smith and Robinson

Convention
- Date(s): June 26–28, 1928
- City: Houston, Texas
- Venue: Sam Houston Hall

Candidates
- Presidential nominee: Alfred E. Smith of New York
- Vice-presidential nominee: Joseph T. Robinson of Arkansas

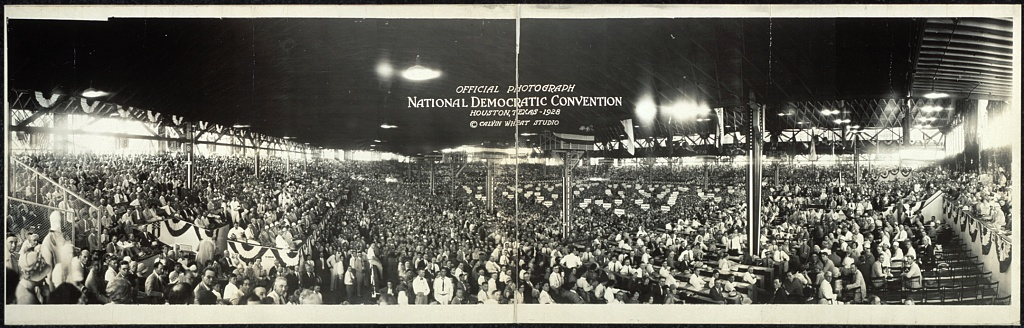
Photograph of the convention

The 1928 Democratic National Convention was held at Sam Houston Hall in Houston, Texas, June 26–28, 1928. The keynote speaker was Claude G. Bowers. The convention resulted in the nomination of Governor Alfred E. Smith of New York for president and Senator Joseph T. Robinson of Arkansas for vice president.

The convention was the first held by either party in the South since the Civil War. It was also the first to nominate a Roman Catholic for president, Al Smith. The Texas delegation, led by Governor Dan Moody, was vehemently opposed to Smith. Therefore, when Smith was nominated, they rallied against his anti-prohibition sentiment by fighting for a "dry", prohibitionist platform. Ultimately, the convention pledged "honest enforcement of the Constitution".

Smith became the first Democrat since Reconstruction to lose more than one southern state in the general election, due to his "wet" stance, his opposition to the Ku Klux Klan, and his Catholicism.

The convention was held in very hot summer weather in a venue without air conditioning.

== Presidential nomination ==
=== Presidential candidates ===
Governor
Al Smith
of New York

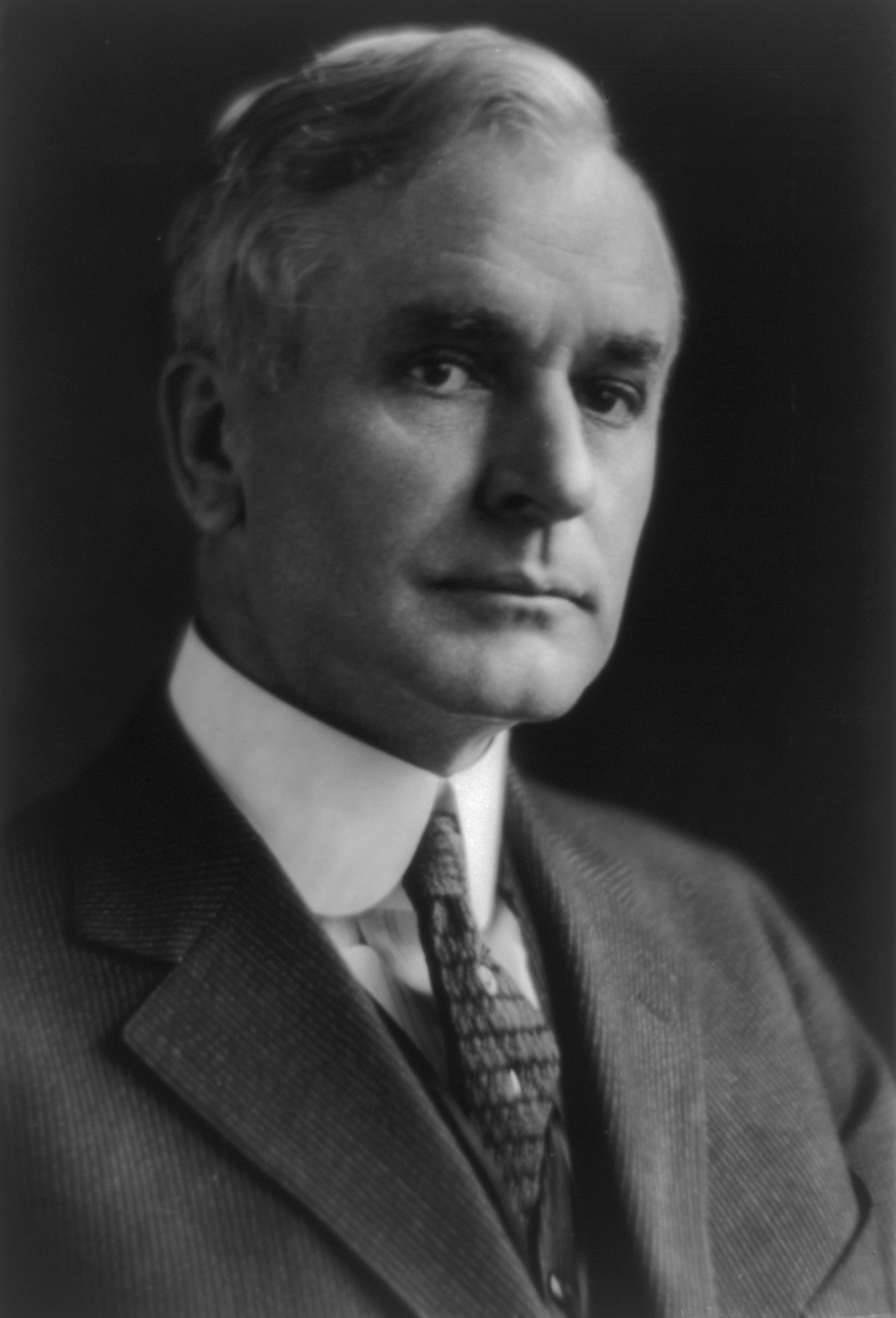
Representative
Cordell Hull
of Tennessee

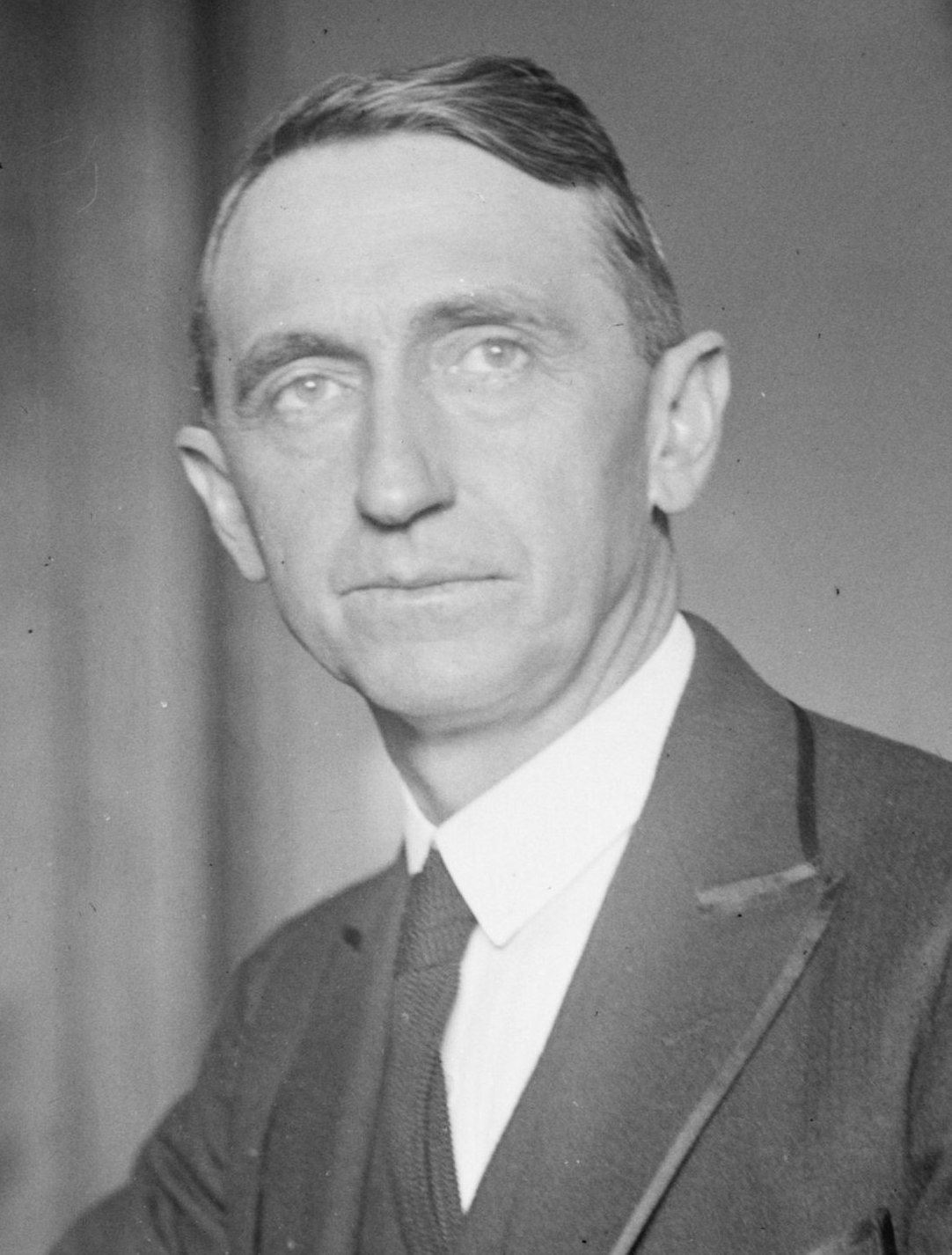
Senator
Walter F. George
of Georgia

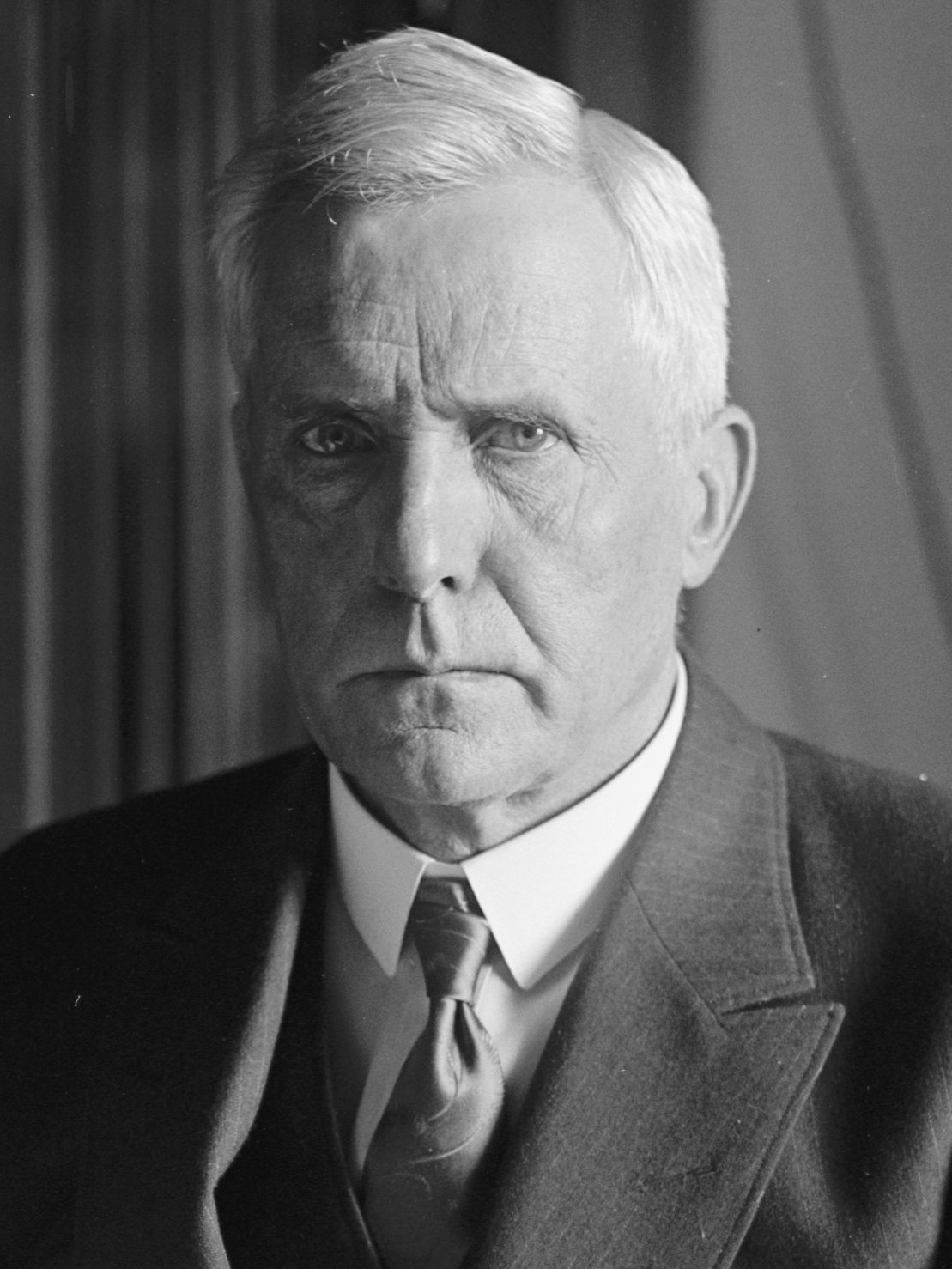
Senator
James A. Reed
of Missouri

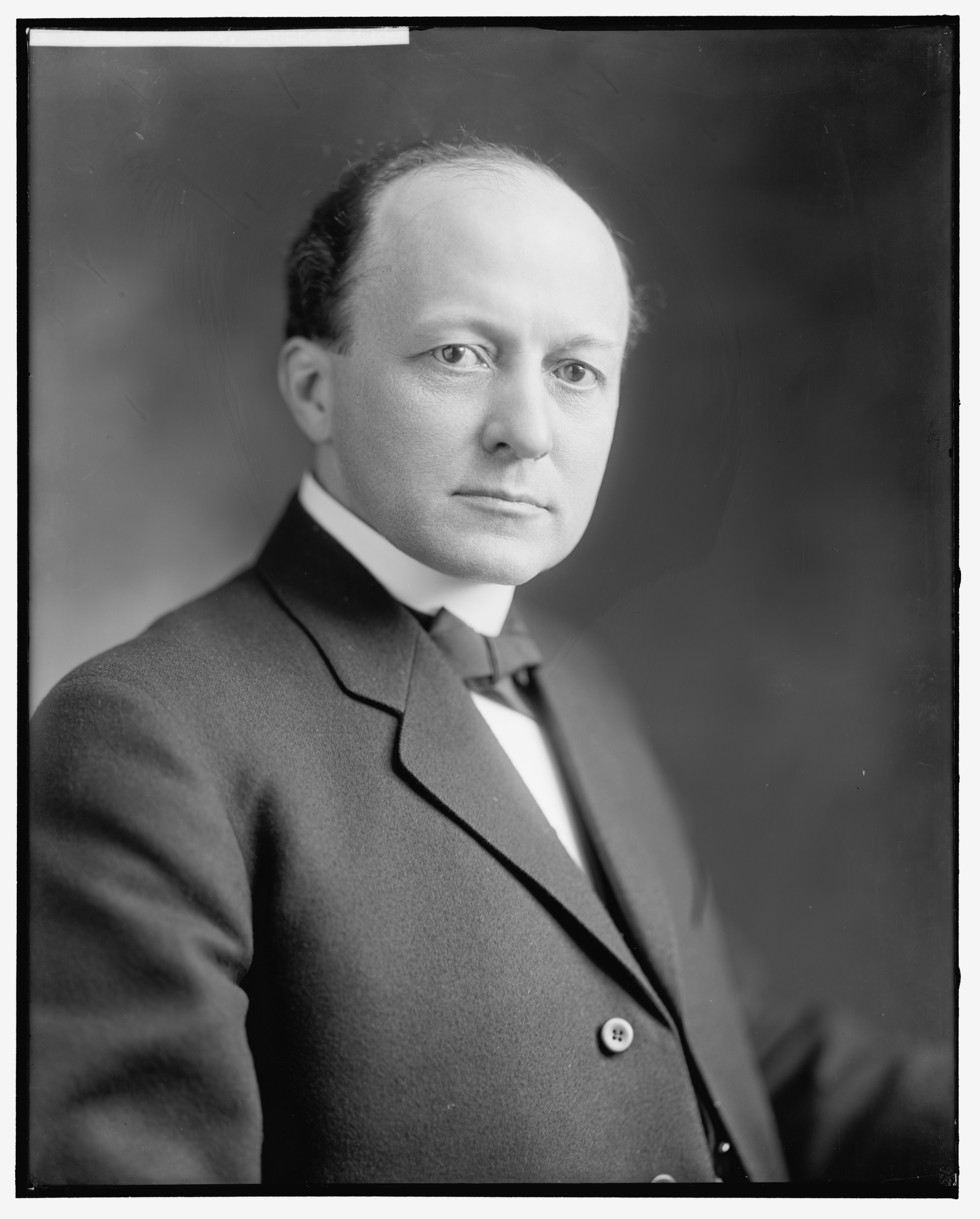
Former Senator
Atlee Pomerene
of Ohio

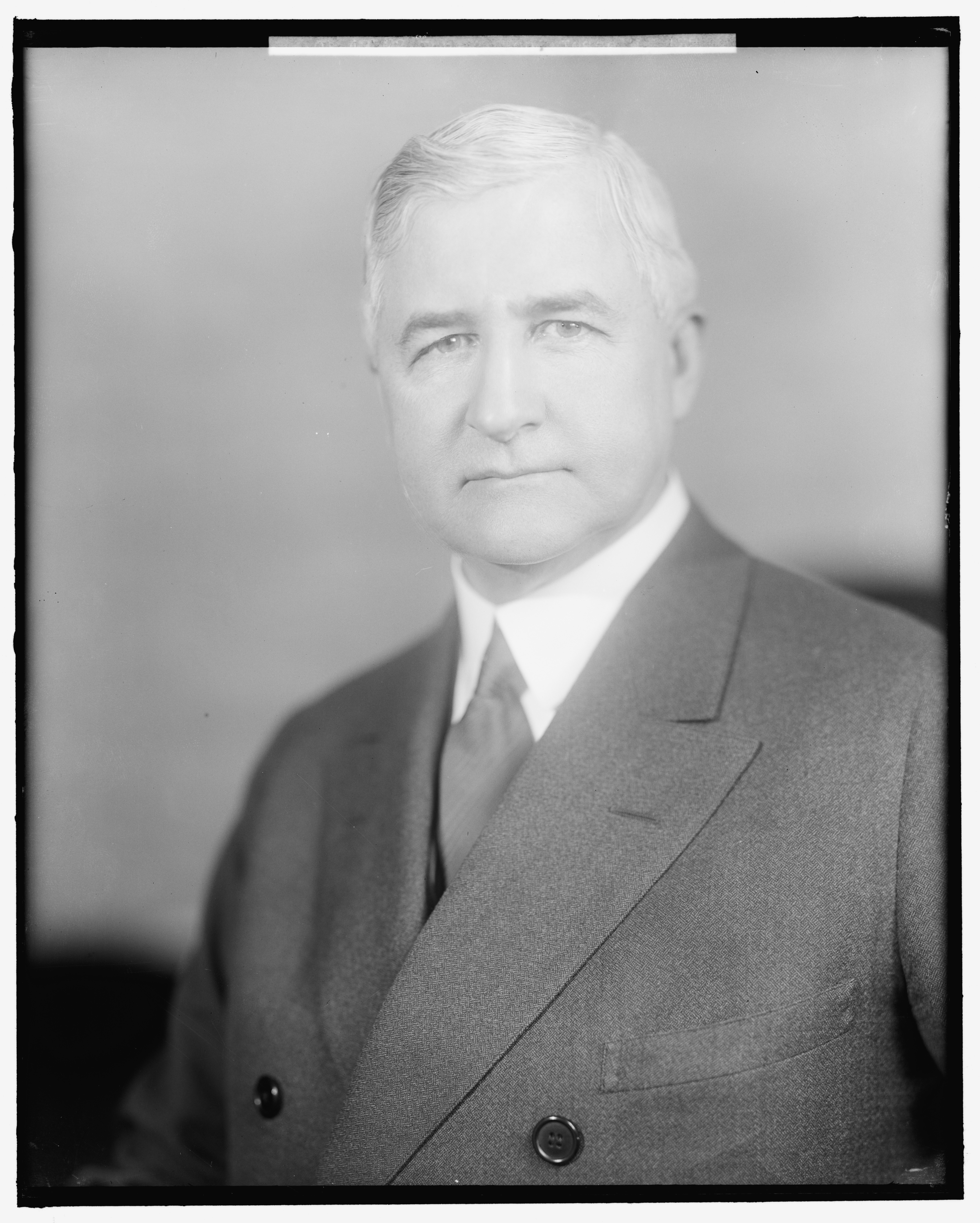
Entrepreneur
Jesse H. Jones
of Texas

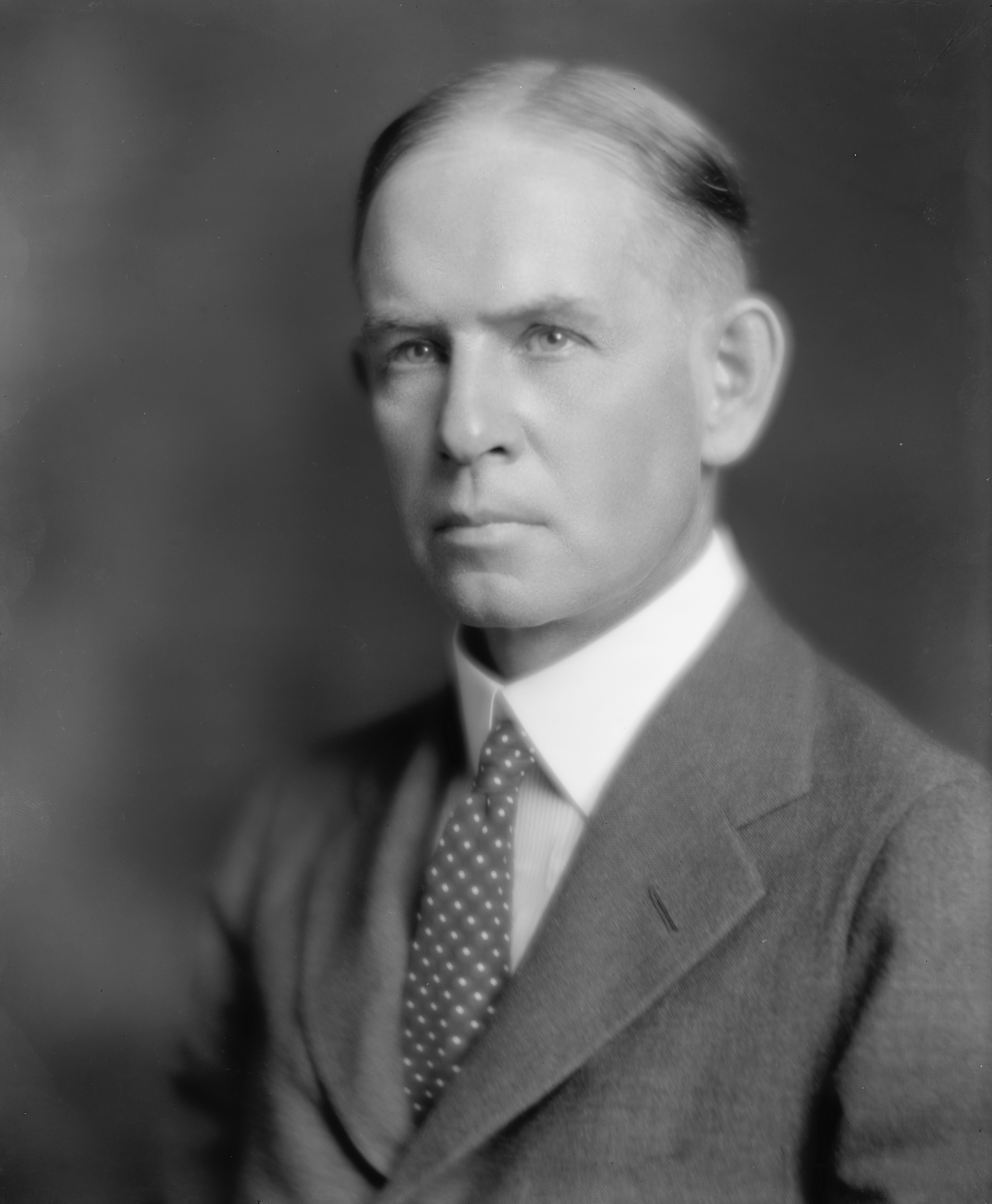
Former Coach
Evans Woollen
of Indiana

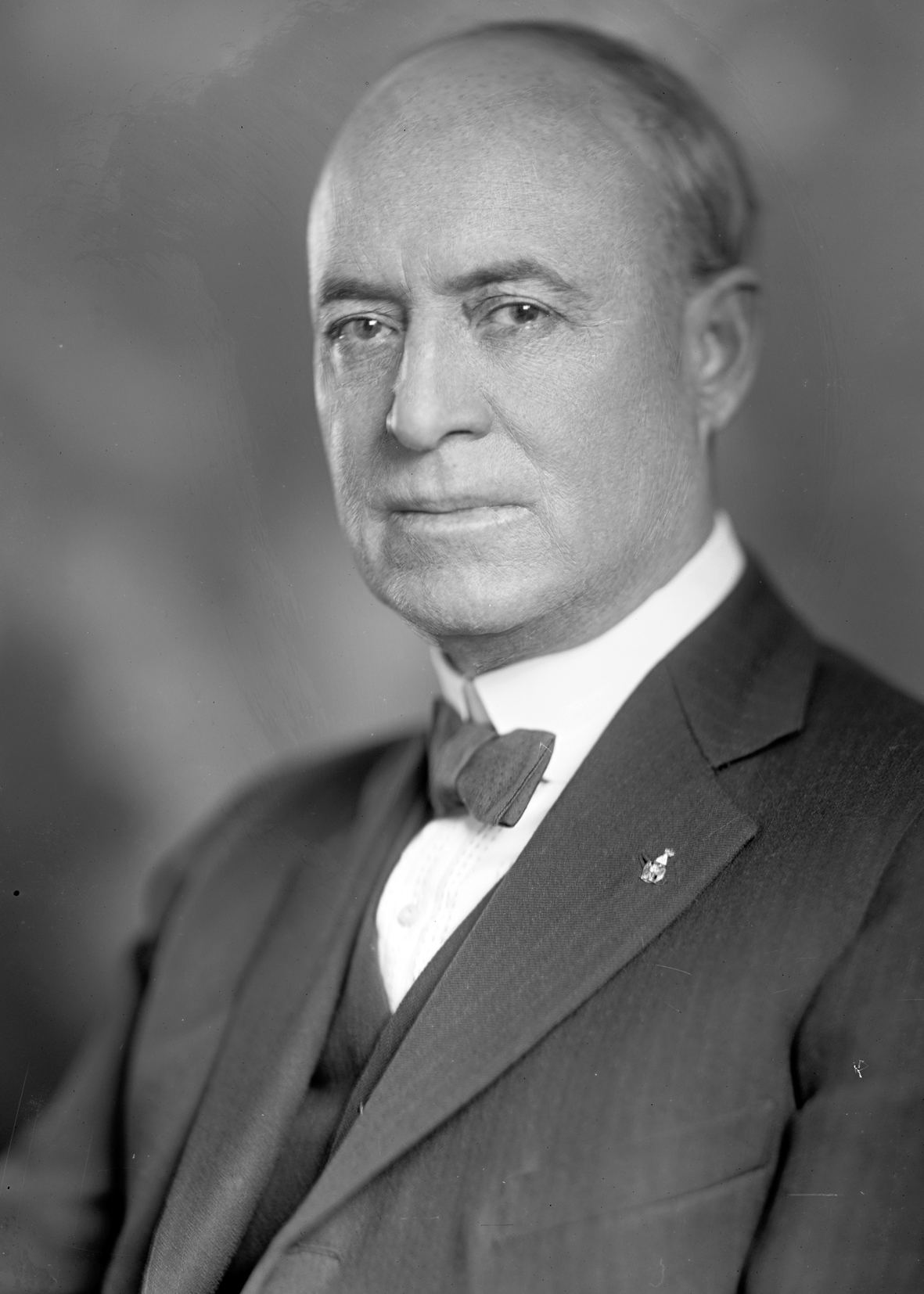
Representative
William A. Ayres
of Kansas

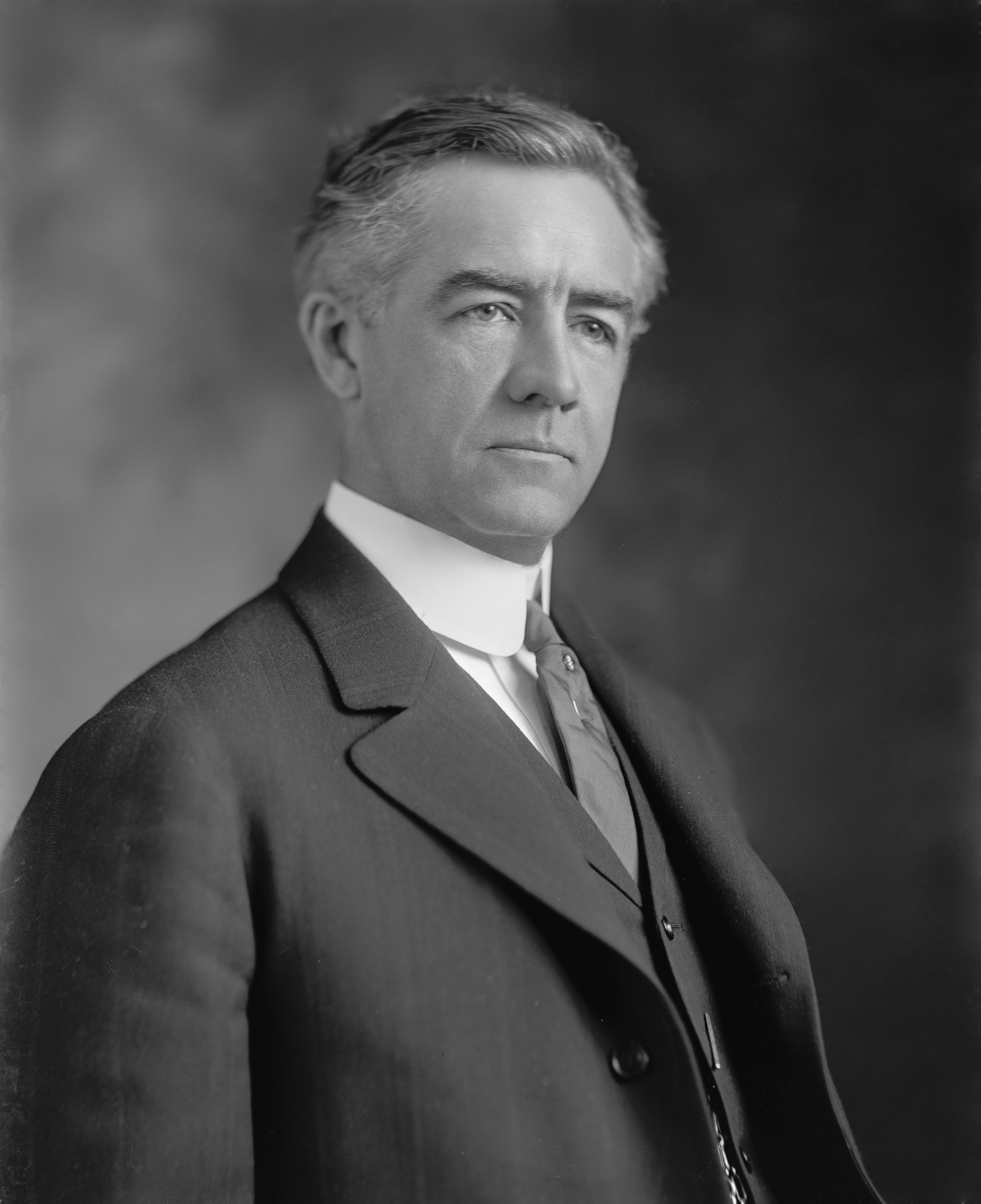
Former Senator
Gilbert Hitchcock
of Nebraska

Other candidates for the nomination possibly included:

- James T. Heflin, U.S. senator from Alabama
- William G. McAdoo, former Treasury Secretary from California
- Henry T. Rainey, U.S. representative from Illinois
- Thomas J. Walsh, U.S. senator from Montana

Presidential Balloting
Candidate	1st (Before Shifts)	1st (After Shifts)
Smith	724.67	849.67
Hull	71.83	50.83
George	52.50	52.50
Reed	48	52
Pomerene	47	3
Jones	43	43
Woollen	32	7
Harrison	20	8.50
Ayres	20	3
Watts	18	18
Hitchcock	16	2
Donahey	5	5
Thompson	2	2
Bilbo	0	1
Not Voting	0	2.50

Presidential Balloting / 3rd Day of Convention (June 28, 1928)

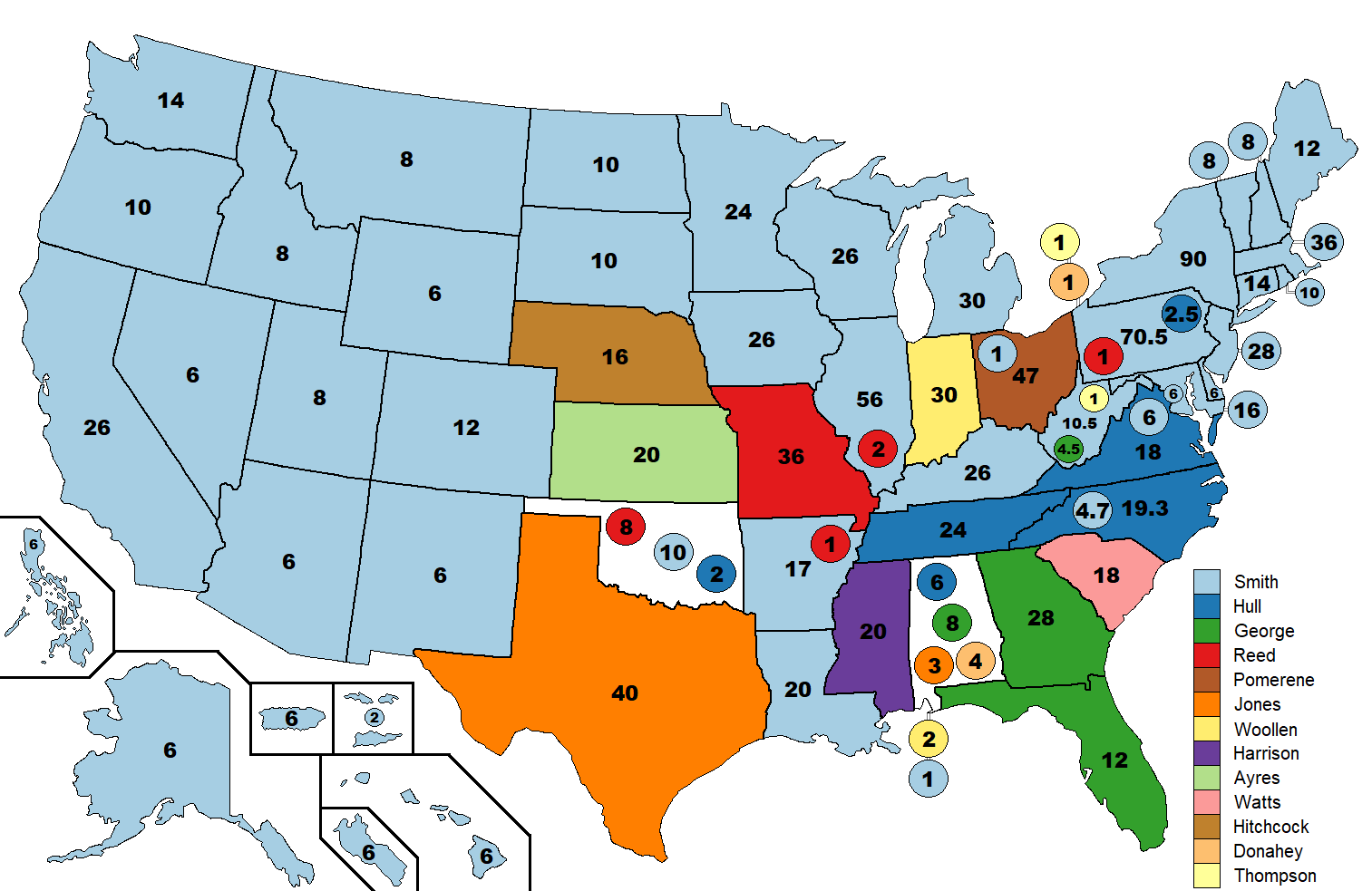
1st Presidential Ballot (Before Shifts)

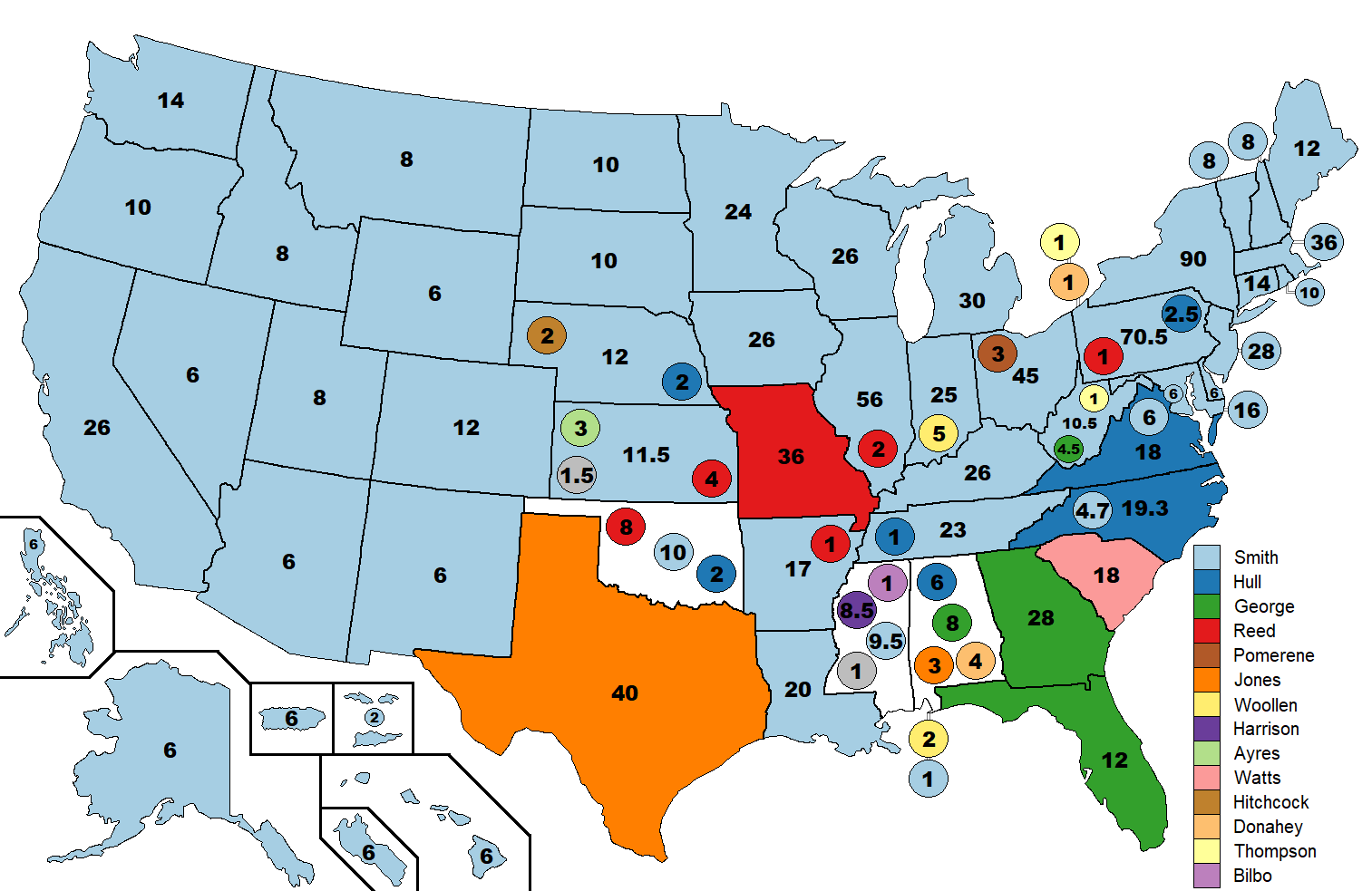
1st Presidential Ballot (After Shifts)

== Vice presidential nomination ==
=== Vice presidential candidates ===
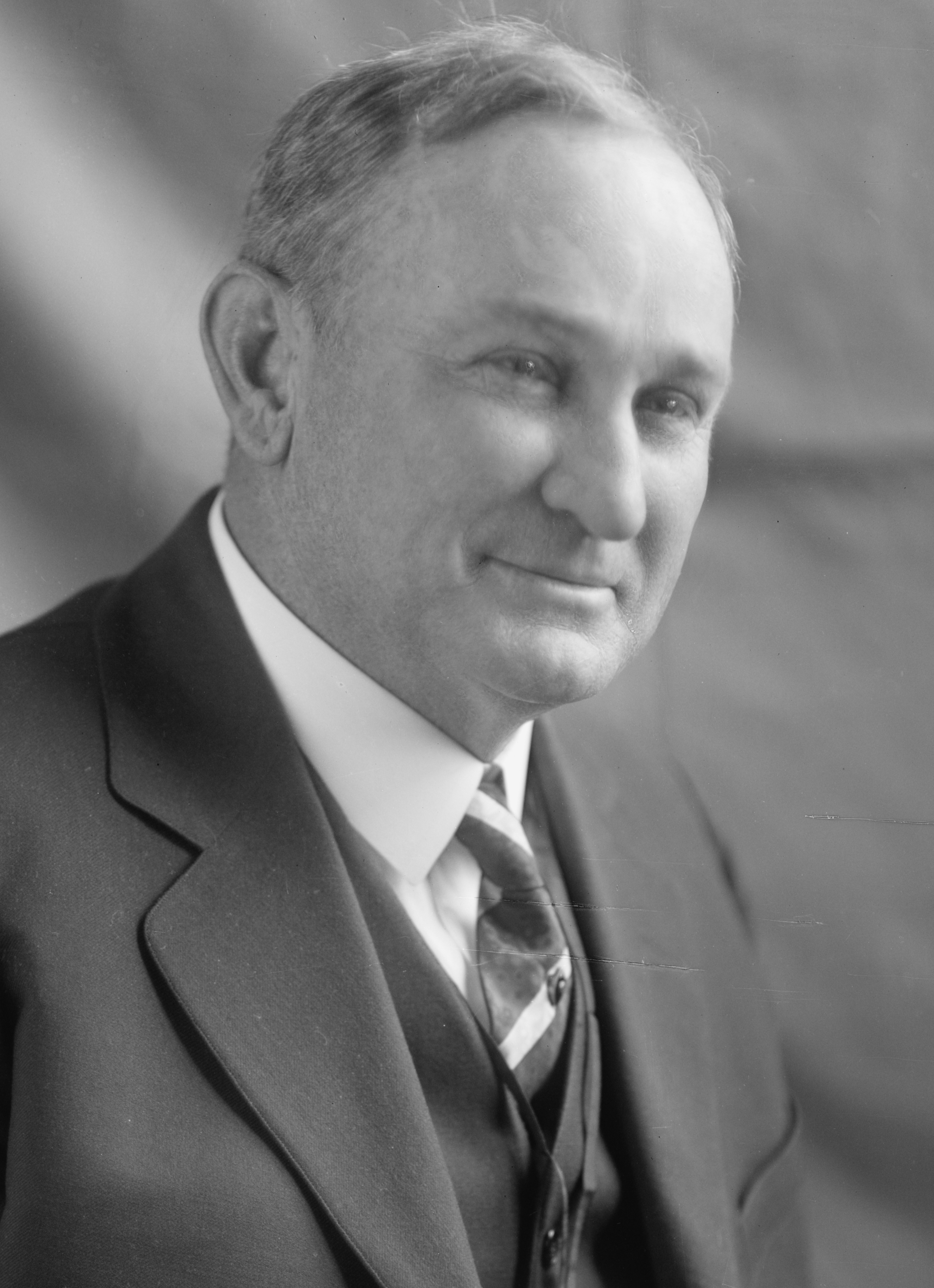
Senate Minority Leader
Joseph T. Robinson
of Arkansas

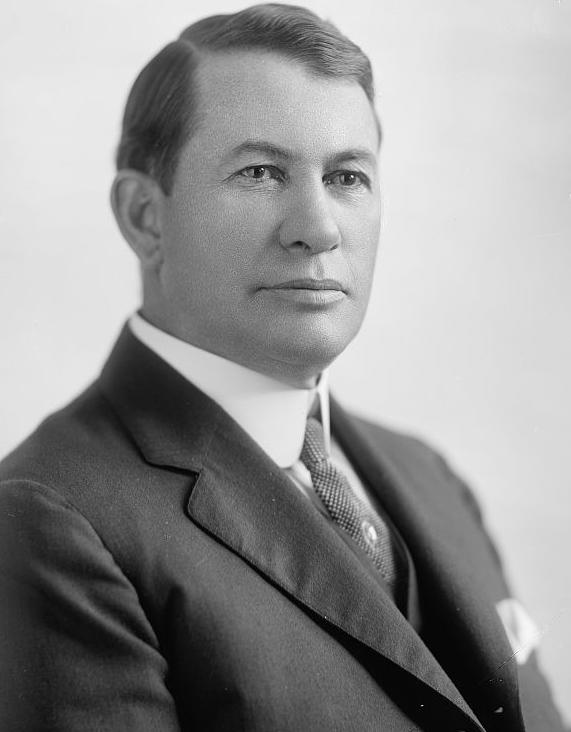
Senator
Alben W. Barkley
of Kentucky

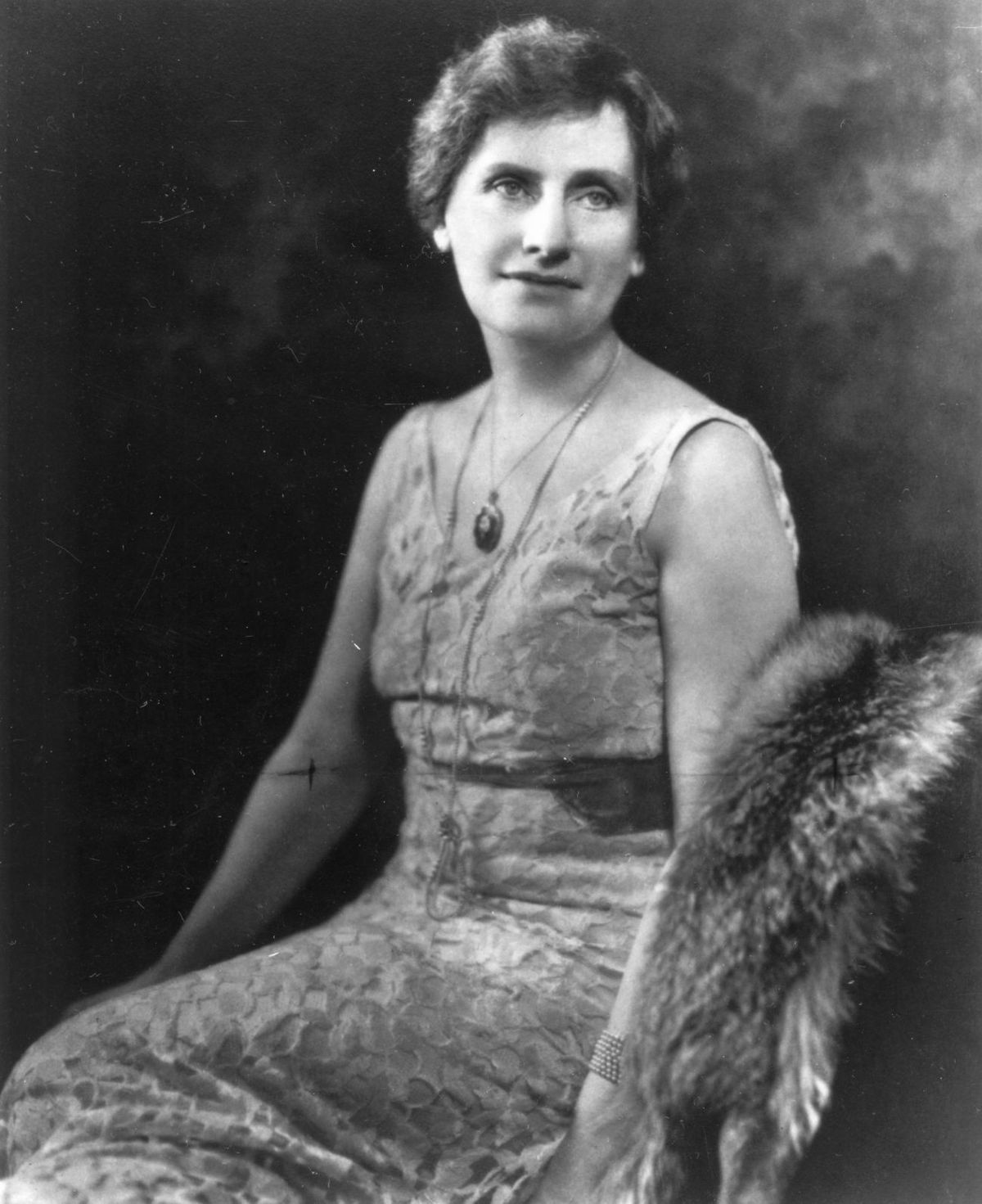
Former Governor
Nellie Tayloe Ross
of Wyoming

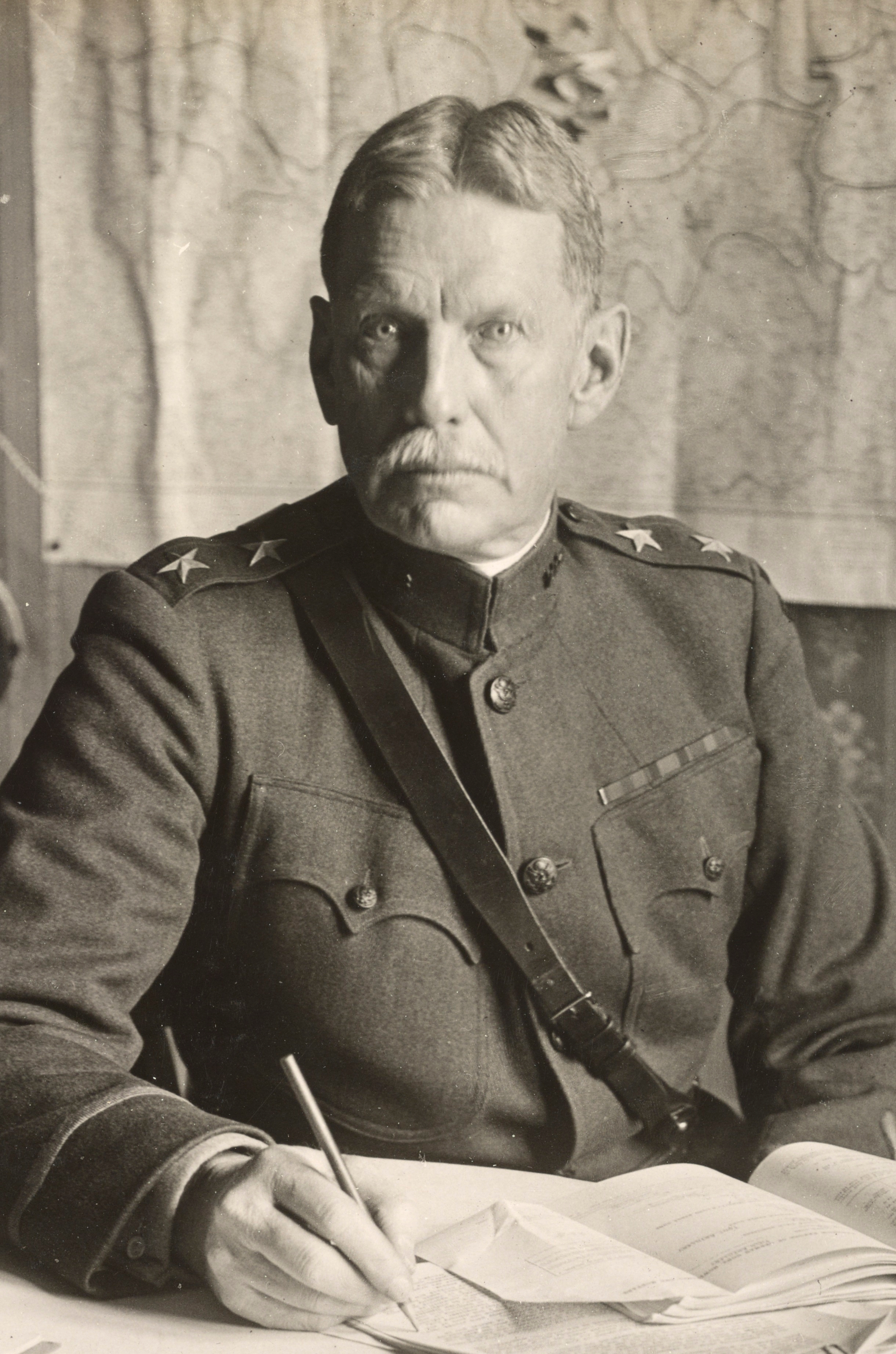
Major General
Henry T. Allen
of Kentucky

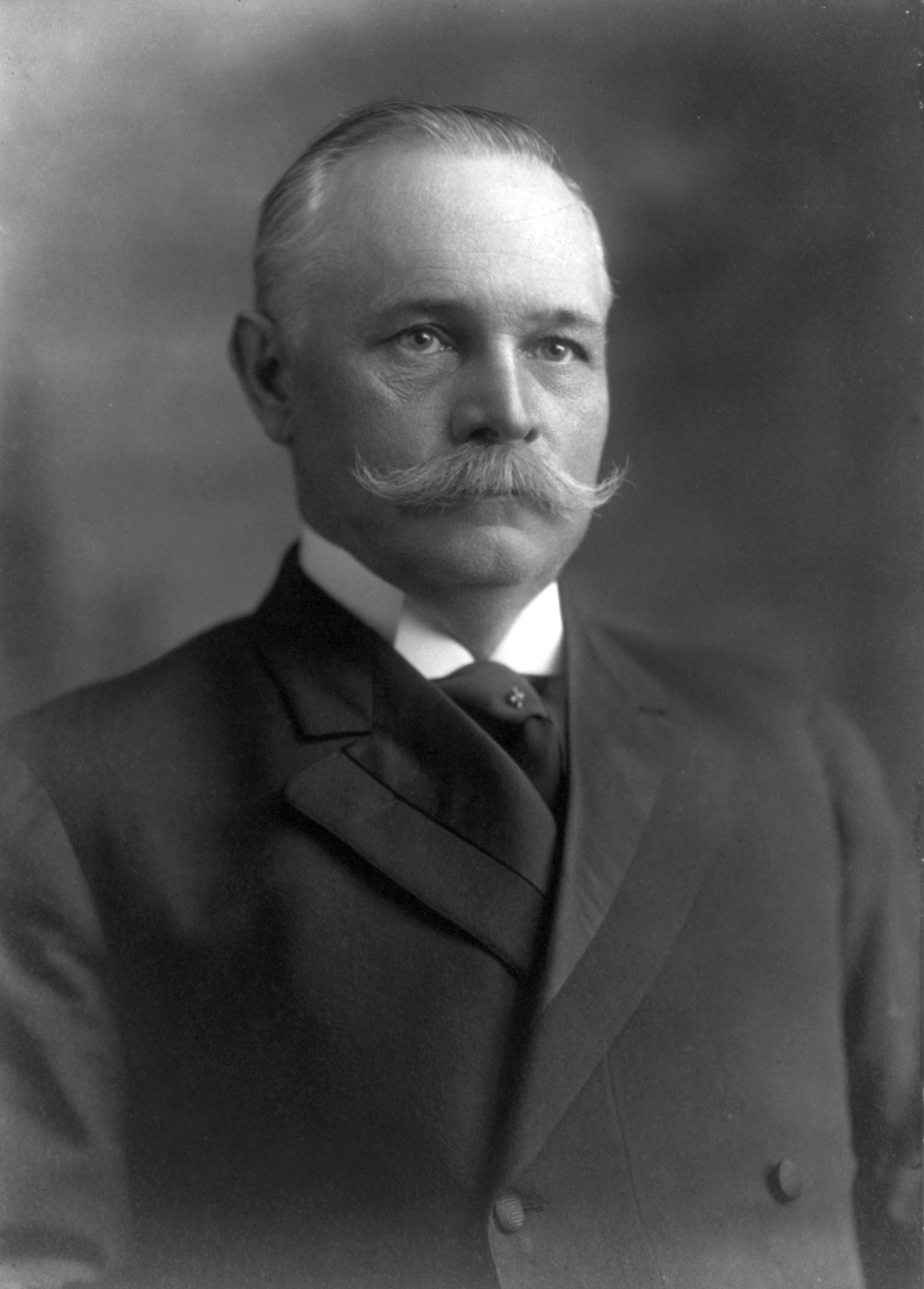
Senator
Duncan U. Fletcher
of Florida

Joseph T. Robinson was chosen as the vice presidential nominee.

Other candidates for the nomination possibly included:

- Gilbert Hitchcock, former senator from Nebraska
- James A. Reed, senator from Missouri
- Atlee Pomerene former senator from Ohio
- Cordell Hull, Congressman from Tennessee
- John H. Taylor

Vice Presidential Balloting
Candidate	1st (Before Shifts)	1st (After Shifts)
Robinson	914.17	1,035.17
Barkley	77	9
Ross	33	2
Allen	28	21
Berry	17.50	11.50
Moody	9.33	9.33
Fletcher	7	7
Taylor	6	0
Stevenson	4	2
Woollen	2	2
Tumulty	1	0
Not Voting	1	1

Vice Presidential Balloting / 3rd Day of Convention (June 28, 1928)

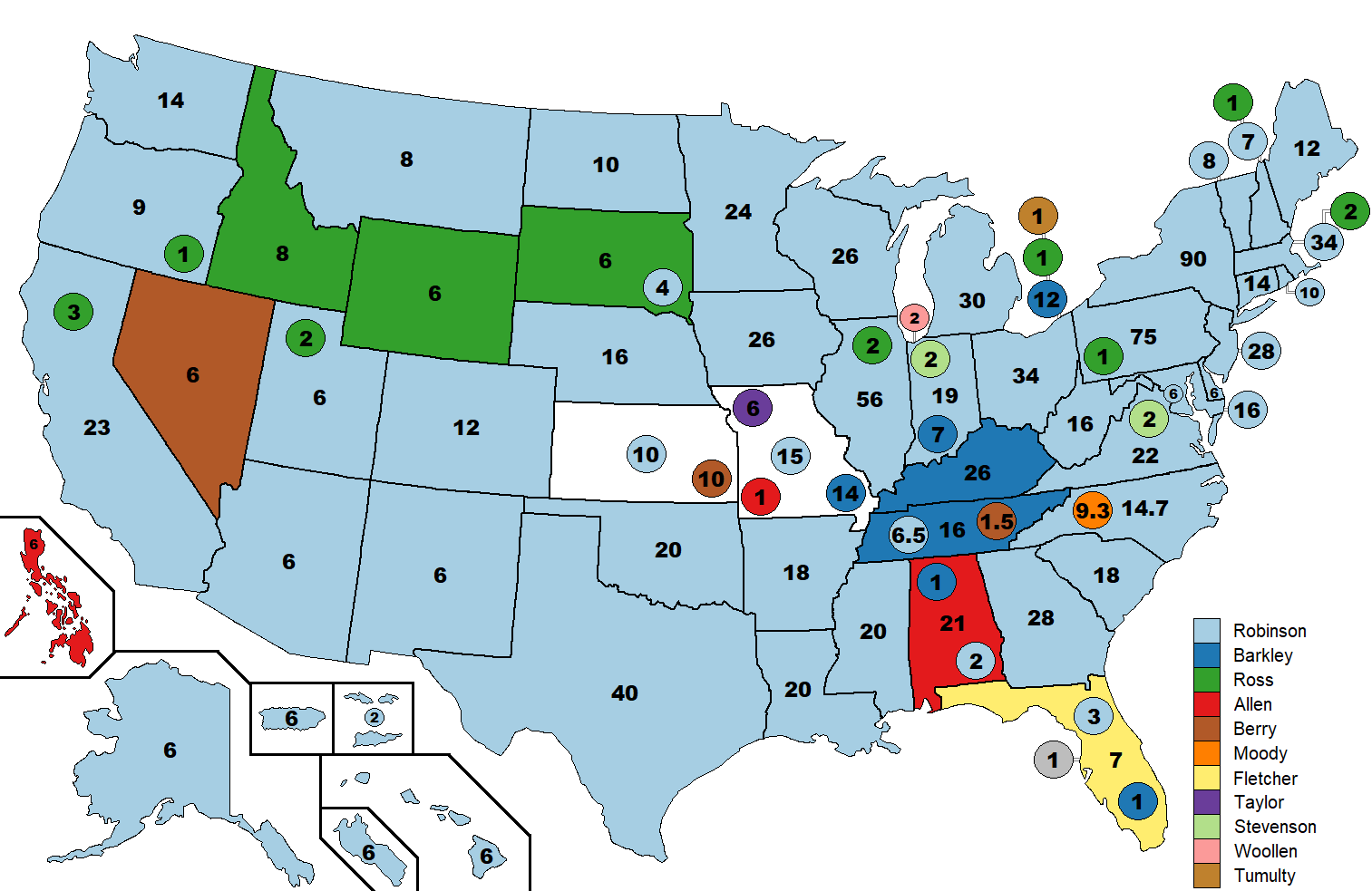
1st Vice Presidential Ballot (Before Shifts)

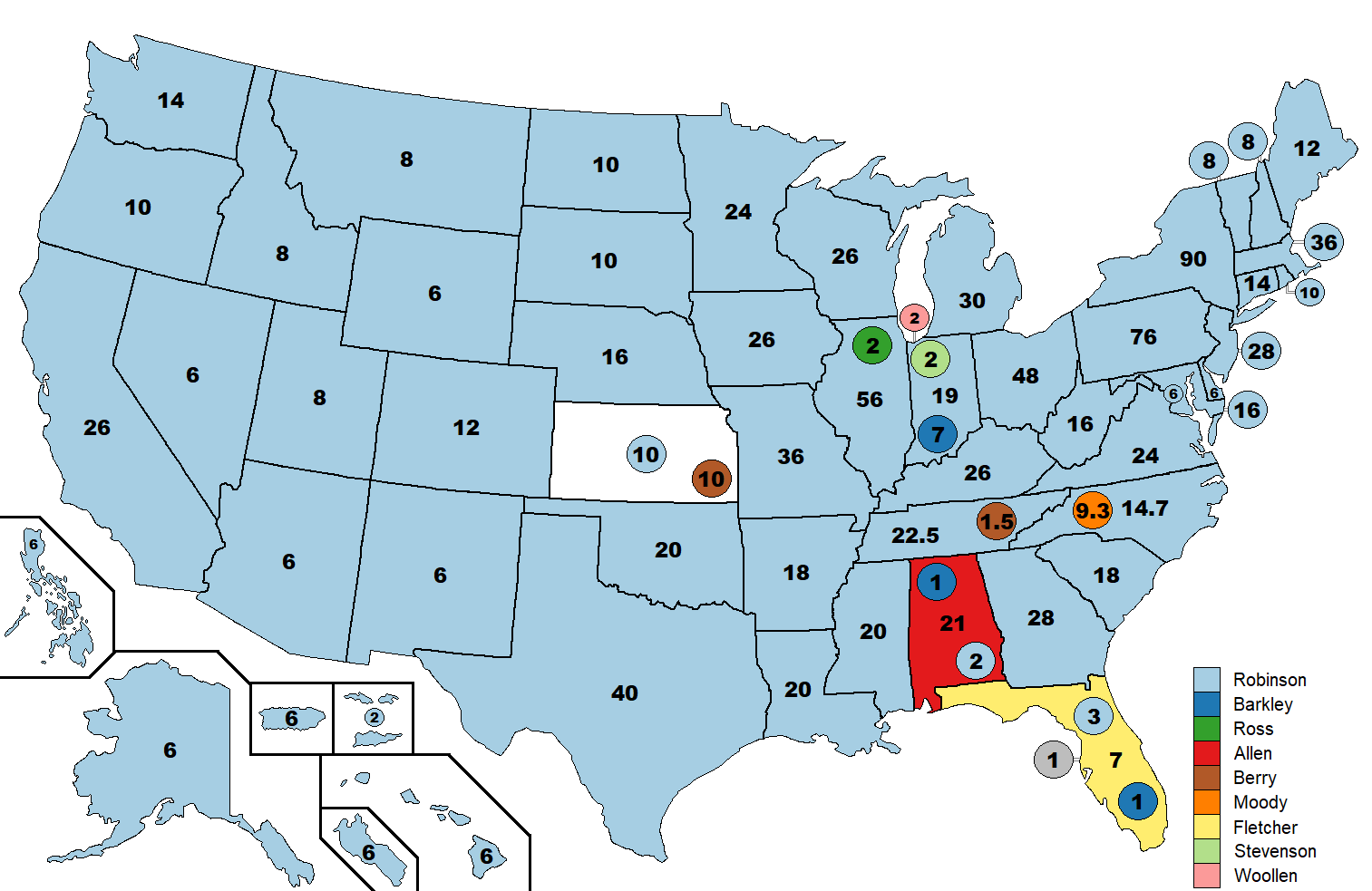
1st Vice Presidential Ballot (After Shifts)

== See also ==
- Democratic Party presidential primaries, 1928
- List of Democratic National Conventions
- U.S. presidential nomination convention
- 1928 United States presidential election
- 1928 Republican National Convention
- History of the United States Democratic Party

Preceded by 1924; New York, New York	Democratic National Conventions	Succeeded by 1932; Chicago, Illinois
