= Ron Cope =

Ronald or Ron Cope may refer to:

- Ronnie Cope (1934–2016), English athlete who played for Manchester United and Luton Town
- Ron Cope (Nebraska politician) (1911–1992), U.S. politician from Nebraska
