= 1926 United States Senate special election in Indiana =

- November 2, 1926
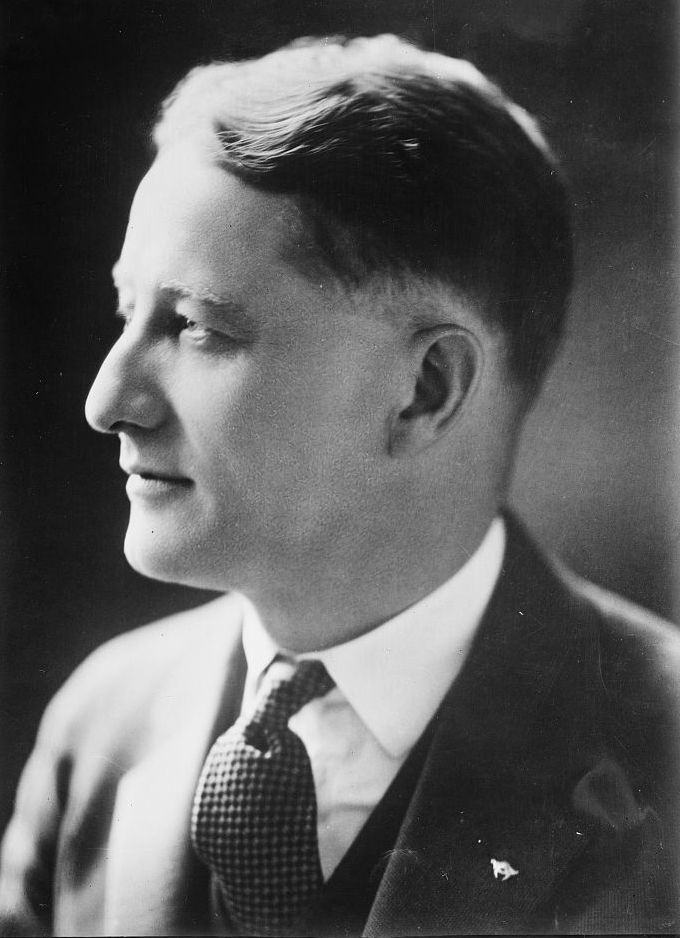

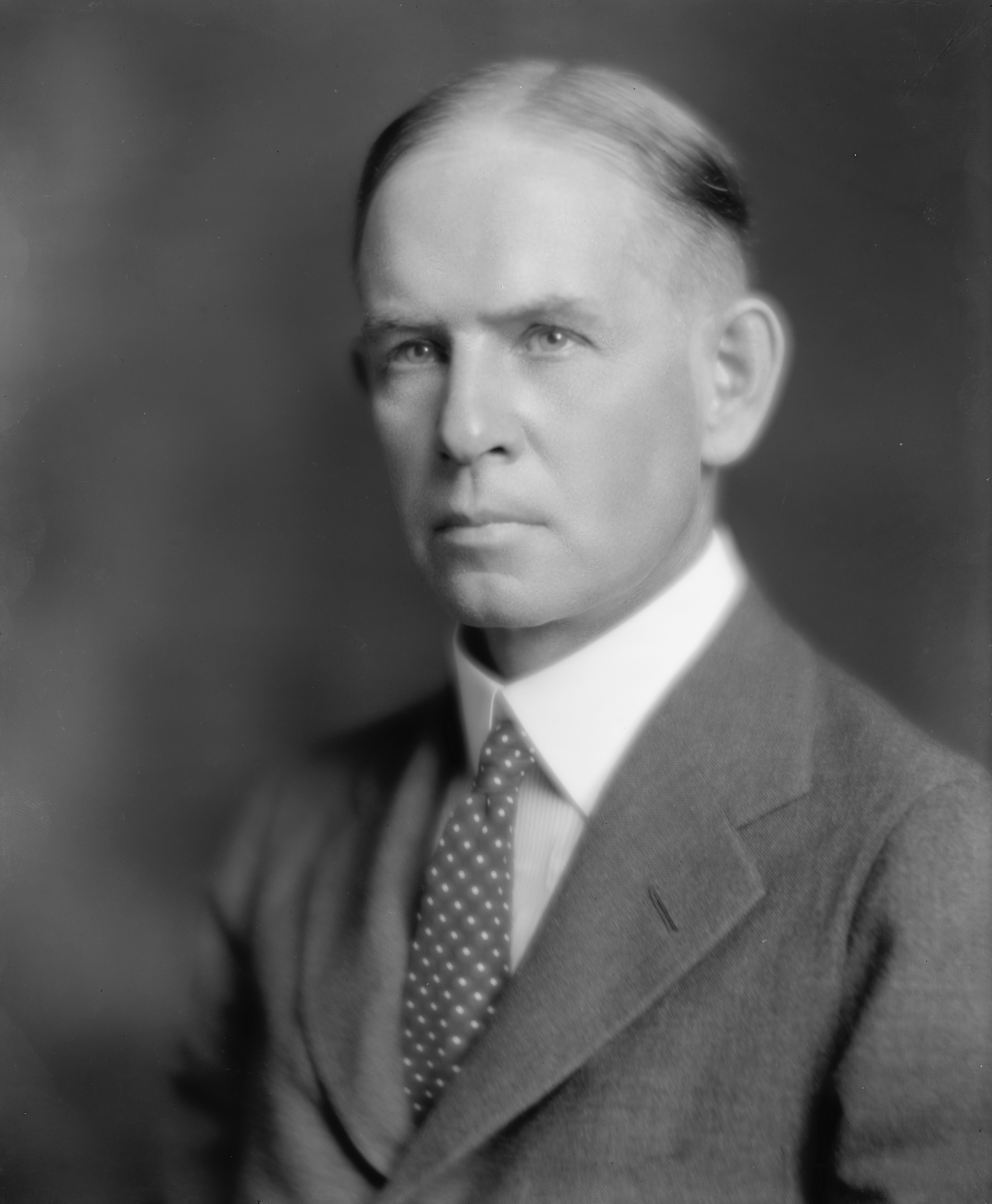
Nominee	Arthur Robinson	Evans Woollen
Party	Republican	Democratic
Popular vote	519,401	496,540
Percentage	50.62%	48.40%
- County results Robinson: 40–50% 50–60% 60–70% 70–80% Woollen: 40–50% 50–60% 60–70%
U.S. senator before election
Arthur Raymond Robinson
Republican
Elected U.S. Senator
Arthur Raymond Robinson
Republican

The 1926 United States Senate special election in Indiana was held on November 2, 1926, to complete the unexpired term of Senator Samuel M. Ralston, who died on October 14, 1925. Interim Republican Senator Arthur Raymond Robinson, who had been appointed to fill the seat, was re-elected to finish the term over Democrat Evans Woollen.

== Background ==
In October 1925, incumbent Senator Samuel Ralston died in office after suffering from heart and kidney diseases, he was very sick before Congress convened in December and died before he could return to work. Governor Edward L. Jackson appointed Arthur Raymond Robinson to fill the seat until a successor could be duly elected, with the election scheduled for November 2, 1926. The winner would finish Ralston's term ending in 1929.

== General election ==
=== Candidates ===
- William O. Fogleson (Socialist)
- Arthur Raymond Robinson, interim appointee Senator (Republican)
- Albert Stanley (Prohibition)
- Evans Woollen, banker, former football coach, and candidate for U.S. Representative in 1896 (Democratic)

=== Results ===
1926 U.S. Senate special election in Indiana
Party	Candidate	Votes	%	±%
Republican	Arthur R. Robinson (incumbent)	519,401	50.62%	▲2.82
Democratic	Evans Woollen	496,540	48.40%	▼2.47
Prohibition	Albert Stanley	5,205	0.51%	N/A
Socialist	William O. Fogleson	4,864	0.47%	▼0.86
Total votes		1,026,010	100.00%	
Republican hold				

== See also ==
- 1926 United States Senate elections
