= Ernest Staubitz =

American politician (1893–1982)

Member of the Nebraska Legislature from the 34th district
- In office January 3, 1961 – January 1, 1963
- Preceded by: Norman Otto
- Succeeded by: Richard Lysinger

Personal details
- Born: June 11, 1893 Buffalo, New York
- Died: April 30, 1982 (aged 88) Laguna Hills, California
- Party: Republican
- Spouse: Frances Runcorn (m. 1922)
- Children: 1 (Joanne)
- Education: Kearney State Normal School
- Occupation: Farm equipment salesman, businessman

Ernest Staubitz (June 11, 1893 – April 30, 1982) was a Republican politician from Nebraska who served as a member of the Nebraska Legislature from the 34th district from 1961 to 1963.

== Early life ==
Staubitz was born in Buffalo, New York, in 1893, and grew up in New York. He moved to Nebraska with his parents when he was 19, and attended Kearney State Normal School, and began working for Patterson and Company, which sold farm equipment.

In 1941, Staubitz was appointed the chairman of the Kearney Board of Public Works. He was elected to the board of directors of the Nebraska Mid-State Reclamation District in 1948, and was subsequently elected president of the board. He was re-elected several times before resigning in 1959 to unsuccessfully lobby Congress for federal funding.

Staubitz ran for the Buffalo County Board of Supervisors in 1954 from the 5th district, and won the Republican primary uncontested. He faced the Democratic nominee, Ed Crowley, in the general election, and defeated him, winning 617 votes to Crowley's 468 votes.

== Nebraska Legislature ==
In 1960, State Senator Norman Otto opted to run for Lieutenant Governor rather than seek re-election, and Staubitz ran to succeed him in the 34th district, which included Buffalo and Sherman counties. No candidates filed to run against him, and he was elected unopposed. He declined to seek re-election in 1962.

== Post-legislative career ==
Staubitz ran for Buffalo County Treasurer in 1962, and faced Luther Wimberley and Max Rojeski in the Republican primary. Wimberley defeated Staubitz by a wide margin, receiving 46 percent of the vote to Staubitz's 26 percent and Rojeski's 28 percent.

In 1968, Staubitz and his wife relocated to California.

== Death ==
Staubitz died on April 30, 1982.
