= 1928 United States Senate election in Indiana =

- November 6, 1928
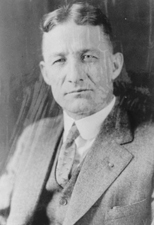

Nominee	Arthur Robinson	Albert Stump
Party	Republican	Democratic
Popular vote	782,144	623,996
Percentage	55.30%	44.12%
- County results Robinson: 50–60% 60–70% Stump: 40–50% 50–60% 60–70%
U.S. senator before election
Arthur Raymond Robinson
Republican
Elected U.S. Senator
Arthur Raymond Robinson
Republican

The 1928 United States Senate election in Indiana took place on November 6, 1928. Incumbent Republican U.S. Senator Arthur Robinson, who had been appointed and elected to finish the unexpired term of Samuel Ralston, was re-elected to a full term in office.

== General election ==
=== Candidates ===
- Charles Ginsberg (Socialist Labor)
- William F. Jackson (Workers)
- Philip K. Reinbold (Socialist)
- Arthur Raymond Robinson, incumbent Senator since 1925 (Republican)
- Arthur L. Gilliom, Indiana Attorney General (Republican)
- Albert Stump (Democratic)
- John Zahnd (National)

=== Results ===
1928 U.S. Senate election in Indiana
Party	Candidate	Votes	%	±%
Republican	Arthur R. Robinson (incumbent)	782,144	55.30%	▲4.68
Democratic	Albert Stump	623,996	44.12%	▼4.28
Prohibition	William H. Harris	4,033	0.29%	▼0.22
Socialist	Philip K. Reinbold	3,346	0.24%	▼0.23
Socialist Labor	Charles Ginsberg	443	0.03%	N/A
Communist	William F. Jackson	327	0.02%	N/A
National Party	John Zahnd	151	0.01%	N/A
Total votes		1,414,440	100.00%	
Republican hold				

== See also ==
- 1928 United States Senate elections
