= Gerald Stromer =

American politician (1942–2020)

Member of the Nebraska Legislature from the 36th district
- In office January 5, 1971 – January 8, 1975
- Preceded by: Leslie Robinson
- Succeeded by: Ron Cope

Personal details
- Born: December 25, 1942 Hastings, Nebraska
- Died: October 24, 2020 (aged 77) Grand Island, Nebraska
- Party: Republican
- Education: Kearney State College (B.A., M.S.); University of Nebraska–Lincoln
- Occupation: Counselor, congressional staffer, lobbyist

Gerald "Jerry" A. Stromer (December 25, 1942 – October 24, 2020) was a Republican politician from Nebraska who served as a member of the Nebraska Legislature from the 36th district from 1971 to 1975.

== Early life ==
Stromer was born in Hastings, Nebraska, in 1942. He attended Kearney State College, graduating with his bachelor's and master's degrees. After graduation, Stromer worked as a counselor at the college and was active in the Nebraska Republican Party, serving as the secretary of the Nebraska Young Republicans.

== Nebraska Legislature ==
In 1966, State Senator Richard Lysinger declined to seek a third term, and Stromer ran to succeed him in the 36th district, which included Buffalo and Hall counties. In the nonpartisan primary, he faced Ralph Lancaster, the superintendent of the Kearney Water Department, and Leslie Robinson, a farmer. Stromer narrowly placed third in the primary, receiving 27 percent of the vote to Lancaster's 30 percent and Robinson's 43 percent, and did not advance to the general election.

Robinson ran for re-election in 1970, and Stromer ran against him. He placed first in the primary election, winning 46 percent of the vote to Robinson's 42 percent and farmer Rudolph Axman's 11 percent. Stromer and Robinson proceeded to the general election. On election night, Robinson led Stromer by 19 votes, but after all votes were counted, Stromer led by 26 votes. Robinson requested a recount, which confirmed that Stromer won by 23 votes.

== 1974 congressional campaign ==
In 1974, Republican Congressman David Martin declined to seek re-election, and Stromer ran in the Republican primary to succeed him in the 3rd district. He faced McCook Mayor Don Blank, rancher Ronald Blauvelt, reverend Gerald Lundby, college instructor Jack Langford, Republican activist Virginia Smith, fellow State Senator J. James Waldron, and insurance salesman Jim Wenger. Stromer ultimately placed third by a narrow margin, receiving 19 percent of the vote to Smith's 21 percent.

== Post-legislative career ==
Stromer was named the executive director of the Nebraska Association of County Officials beginning in 1977. In 1978, the executive board of the association requested Stromer's resignation.

In 1979, Stromer moved to Washington, D.C., to join the staff of Republican Congressman Jim Jeffries, who represented Kansas's 2nd district. He later served as a lobbyist for the Synthetic Fuels Corporation and the U.S. Agency for International Development, and served in the office of public liaison at the U.S. Department of Agriculture.

== Death ==
Stromer died on October 24, 2020.
