= Matt Williams (Nebraska politician) =

American politician (born 1949)

Member of the Nebraska Legislature from the 36th district
- In office January 7, 2015 – January 4, 2023
- Preceded by: John Wightman
- Succeeded by: Rick Holdcroft

Personal details
- Born: February 5, 1949 (age 77)
- Party: Republican
- Occupation: Banker

Matthew H. ("Matt") Williams (born February 5, 1949) is a politician from the state of Nebraska in the Midwestern United States. In 2014, he was elected to the Nebraska Legislature, representing a district in the south central part of the state. Williams is a member of the Republican Party.

== Personal life and professional career ==
Williams was born on February 5, 1949, in Gothenburg, Nebraska. His great-grandfather, Henry L. Williams, had settled in the Gothenburg area in the early 1890s, where he farmed and ranched before founding the Gothenburg State Bank in 1902. Williams's grandfather and then his father served as the bank's presidents.

Williams worked on the family farm in his youth. He graduated from Gothenburg High School in 1967, then attended the University of Nebraska–Lincoln, receiving a degree in business administration in 1971. In 1969, he married nursing student Susan Kay Wright; the couple eventually produced two children. Intending to become a lawyer rather than to carry on the family's farming or banking operations, he attended the University of Nebraska College of Law.

In 1973, however, his father unexpectedly died, and responsibility for the family bank devolved upon Williams. He joined the bank as vice-president, commuted between Gothenburg and Lincoln until he completed his Juris Doctor degree in 1974, then moved to Gothenburg. In 1979, he assumed the presidency of the bank.

During the 1980s U.S. Farm Crisis, Williams was forced to sell part of his family farm in effort to keep the Gothenburg bank alive The bank attempted to give farmers as much flexibility as possible in managing their loans, and over the course of the farm crisis, only two of their farm customers declared bankruptcy. During and after the crisis, Williams and other residents aggressively recruited industries; eventually, four Fortune 500 companies set up operations in the Gothenburg area.

Williams served as chair of the Nebraska Bankers Association in 2003–04. In 2008, he joined the board of the American Bankers Association; in 2012–2013, he chaired the organization.

== Political career ==
=== 2014 election ===
In September 2013, Williams stated that he was considering running either for the Nebraska governorship or for an open seat in the Nebraska Legislature. In late October, he announced that he would seek the legislative seat representing District 36, consisting of Dawson, Custer, and the northern third of Buffalo Counties, and including the cities of Gothenburg, Lexington, Cozad, and Broken Bow. Under Nebraska's term-limits law, the incumbent, John Wightman, a Republican from Lexington, was ineligible to run for a third consecutive term.

Williams, a Republican, faced a single opponent in the contest. Luis Sotelo, a Lexington Democrat, was a college-planning specialist working for EducationQuest, a Lincoln-based nonprofit established to improve access to post-secondary education in Nebraska. A native of Chihuahua in northern Mexico, Sotelo had been brought to the United States by his parents at the age of five. He had graduated from Lexington High School in 2007 and from Northwestern University in 2011, then taught school in Kansas City with the Teach For America organization.

In the course of the campaign, Williams declared that the two most critical current issues in Nebraska were water policy, which he described as unsustainable, and the state's tax structure, which he said handicapped attempts to recruit businesses; he stated that his background in business and in agriculture and his "proven leadership skills" were what the voters wanted and needed. Sotelo asserted that education, particularly in early childhood, was a critical issue, and said that the legislature needed members who would represent Latinos, Africans, and the middle class, "not just upper-class whites".

When the nonpartisan primary election was held in May 2014, Williams received 6348 of the 7368 votes cast, or 86.2% of the total. Sotelo received 1020 votes, or 13.8%. Since there were only two candidates running, both moved on to the general election.

Over the entire course of the campaign, Williams collected over $110,000 in contributions, and spent over $91,000. The Sotelo campaign collected over $37,000, and spent over $34,000. Major contributors to Williams's campaign included the Nebraska Realtors PAC, which gave $7000; the Nebraska Bankers State PAC, with contributions of over $4000; and the Nebraska Telecommunications Association, which yielded $4000. The Gothenburg State Bank contributed about $2600; several other banks and the Nebraska Independent Community Bankers PAC made up over $2600 in contributions. Sotelo's single largest contributor was Leadership for Educational Equity, which provided $7750; the group describes itself as "a nonpartisan, nonprofit organization dedicated to empowering Teach For America corps members and alumni to grow as leaders in their communities and help build the movement for educational equity". Sotelo also received $1750 from the Brotherhood of Locomotive Engineers, and $1470 from the Nebraska Democratic Party. The Nebraska State Education Association contributed $1350 to each campaign.

In the November 2014 general election, Williams received 7599 of the 9747 votes cast, or 78% of the total. Sotelo received 2148 votes, or 22%.

=== Legislative tenure ===
==== 2015 session ====
In the 2015 legislative session, Williams was named vice-chair of Banking, Commerce, and Insurance Committee; he was also appointed to the Judiciary Committee.
