= Jim D. Cudaback =

American politician

Member of the Nebraska Legislature from the 36th district
- In office January 9, 1991 – January 3, 2007
- Preceded by: Lorraine Langford
- Succeeded by: John Wightman

Personal details
- Born: April 12, 1938 (age 88) Riverdale, Nebraska
- Party: Republican
- Education: Kearney State College, Lincoln School of Commerce

Military service
- Allegiance: United States
- Branch/service: United States Air Force
- Years of service: 1957–1961

Jim D. Cudaback (born 1938) is a Republican politician from Nebraska who served as a member of the Nebraska Legislature from the 36th district from 1991 to 2007.

Cudaback was born in Riverdale, Nebraska, and graduated from Riverdale High School, later attending Kearney State College and the Lincoln School of Commerce. He served in the United States Air Force from 1957 to 1961. Cudabeck was elected to the Riverdale Village Board and the Buffalo County Board of Supervisors.

In 1990, Cudabeck challenged incumbent Senator Lorraine Langford for re-election, and ultimately defeated her. He was re-elected in 1994, 1998, and 2002, and was unable to seek another term in 2006 due to term limits.
