= Ray Lundy =

American politician (1916–1987)

Ray E. Lundy

Member of the Nebraska Legislature from the 36th district
- In office January 5, 1983 – January 7, 1987
- Preceded by: Ron Cope
- Succeeded by: Lorraine Langford

Personal details
- Born: August 4, 1916 Grady, New Mexico
- Died: August 20, 1987 (aged 71) Kearney, Nebraska
- Party: Democratic
- Spouse: Doris E. Wales (m. 1936)
- Children: 5 (Kathryn, Karen, Judy, Susan, James)
- Occupation: City manager and administrator

Ray E. Lundy (August 4, 1916 – August 20, 1987) was a Democratic Party politician from Nebraska who served as a member of the Nebraska Legislature from the 36th district from 1983 to 1987.

== Early career ==
Lundy was born in Grady, New Mexico, and grew up in Arkansas City, Kansas, graduating from Arkansas City High School and attending Arkansas City Junior College. He worked for the Goodland, Kansas, city government as city clerk and manager of utilities, and moved to Kearney, Nebraska, in 1953. Lundy served as Kearney City Manager for twenty-eight years before retiring. He was appointed to the state Library Commission in 1972 by Governor J. James Exon.

== Nebraska Legislature ==
In 1982, Lundy ran to succeed State Senator Ron Cope in the 36th district, which was based in Buffalo and Hall counties. In the nonpartisan primary, Lundy faced Lorraine Langford, a civic volunteer and Republican Party activist, and David Stubbs, a member of the Central Community College board and the owner of a dental laboratory. In the primary, Lundy placed first, winning 38 percent of the vote to Langford's 33 percent and Stubbs's 29 percent. Lundy and Langford advanced to the general election, and though the race was formally nonpartisan, Lundy was a Democrat and Langford was a Republican.

On election night, Langford appeared to narrowly defeat Lundy, but following a recount, Langford was found to have lost to Lundy by 54 votes following a human error in calculation.

Lundy declined to seek re-election in 1986, and was ultimately succeeded by Langford.

== Death ==
Lundy died on August 20, 1987.
