= John Wightman =

American politician

Chair of the Executive Board of the Nebraska Legislature
- In office January 7, 2009 – January 7, 2015
- Preceded by: L. Patrick Engel
- Succeeded by: Bob Krist

Member of the Nebraska Legislature from the 36th district
- In office 2007–2015
- Preceded by: Jim Cudaback
- Succeeded by: Matt Williams

Personal details
- Born: John Milton Wightman; October 2, 1938 North Platte, Nebraska, U.S.
- Died: January 5, 2017 (aged 78) Lexington, Nebraska, U.S.
- Party: Republican

John Milton Wightman (October 2, 1938 – January 5, 2017) was a politician from the state of Nebraska in the Midwestern United States. He served two terms, from 2007 to 2015, in the Nebraska Legislature, representing a district in the central part of the state. Wightman was a member of the Republican Party.

== Early life and education ==
Wightman was born on October 2, 1938, in North Platte, Nebraska. He grew up between Sumner and Overton, and graduated from Sumner High School in 1956. He obtained a B.S. from Kearney State College, now the University of Nebraska at Kearney, in 1959. After teaching high school for one year in Dannebrog, he attended the University of Nebraska College of Law, receiving a J.D. in 1963.

In 1963, Wightman moved to Lexington to practice law.

== Political career ==
Wightman served several terms on the Lexington city council, amounting to some 20 years; for two of those years, he served as the city's mayor.

In 2006, Wightman ran for the Nebraska legislature from the 36th District, which consisted of parts of Buffalo and Dawson Counties in the south-central part of the state. He was one of two candidates, both Republicans, in the nonpartisan race; the other was Dick Pierce, a farmer and rancher from Miller, then a member of the Buffalo County Board of Supervisors. In the May 2006 primary election, Wightman received 4227 of the 7147 votes cast, or 59.1% of the total; Pierce obtained 2920 votes, or 40.9%. Since only two candidates had run in the primary, both moved on to the November general election, which Wightman won with 5623 votes (55.3%) to Pierce's 4552 votes (44.7%).

In 2010, Wightman was unopposed for re-election to the 36th District seat. Based on the 2010 U.S. census, the boundaries of the district were redrawn in 2011; it now consisted of the entirety of Dawson and Custer Counties, and the northern half of Buffalo County.

Wightman suffered health problems during his tenure in the Legislature, including several knee replacements, one of which was followed by a persistent infection that forced him to miss part of the 2011 legislative session. In September 2012, he suffered what was described as a "moderate" stroke; later, he stated that he had no memory of the two weeks after the stroke.

Under Nebraska's term-limits law, Wightman was ineligible to run for a third consecutive term in 2014. He was succeeded by Gothenburg banker Matt Williams.

== Personal life ==
In 1964, he married Janet L. Hyde; the couple eventually had three children.

Wightman died on January 5, 2017, at the age of 78.
