= Evans Woollen =

American politician

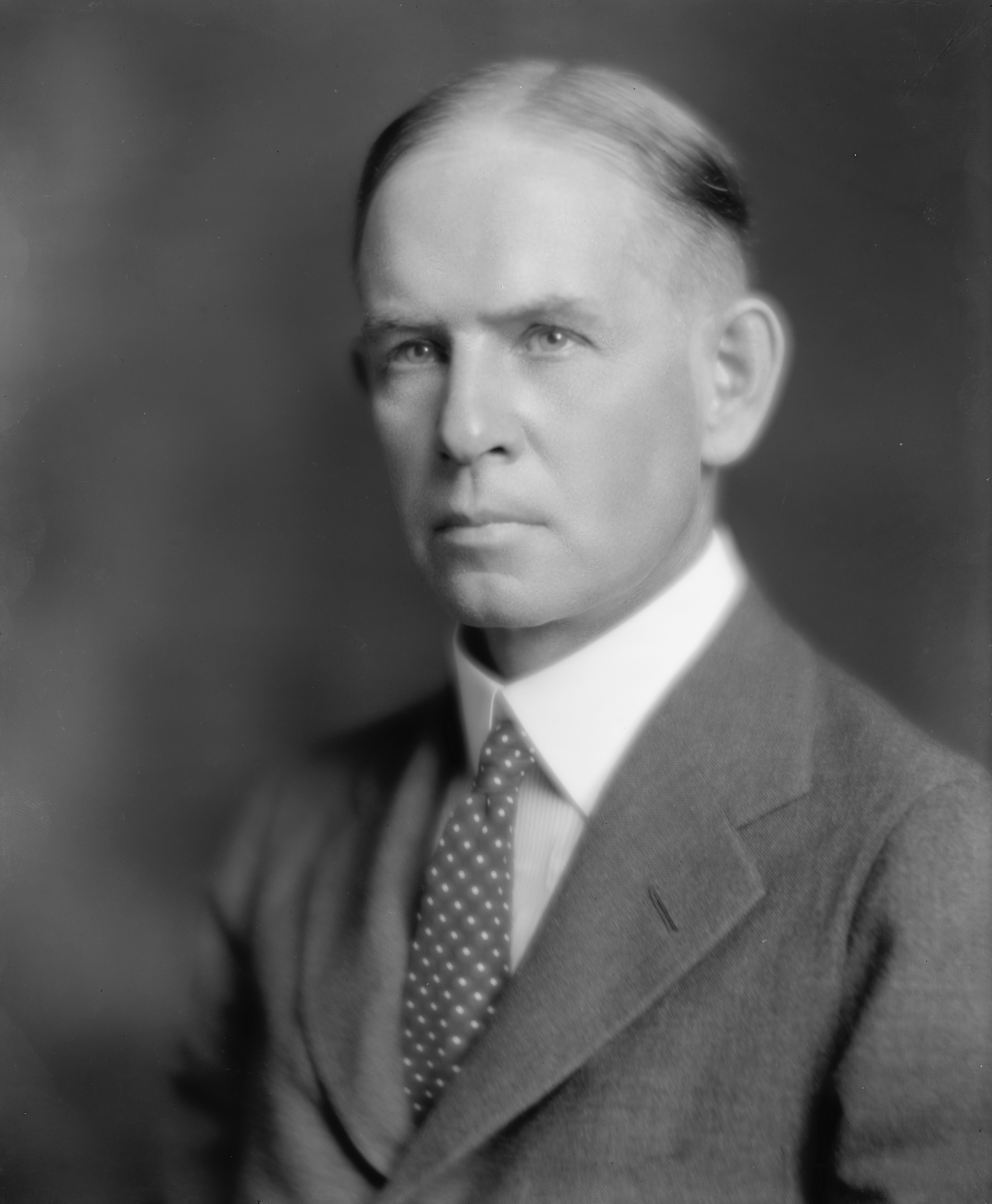

Biographical details
- Born: November 28, 1864; Indianapolis, Indiana, U.S
- Died: May 20, 1942 (aged 77); Indianapolis, Indiana, U.S

Coaching career (HC unless noted)
- 1886: Wabash
- 1889: Indiana

Head coaching record
- Overall: 2–2–1

Evans Woollen (November 28, 1864 – May 20, 1942) was an American lawyer, banker, political figure, and college football coach.

== Education, coaching career, and banking career ==
Woollen graduated from Yale University in 1886 with a bachelor's degree and received a master's degree from Yale in 1889.

In 1886, he taught the Wabash College football team how to play the game. In 1889, he served as head coach at Indiana University. His career college football record is 2–2–1.

In 1912, Woollen founded the Fletcher Savings and Trust Company.

== Political career ==
Woolen ran unsuccessfully for the United States House of Representatives in 1896 and the United States Senate in 1926. Woollen was a candidate for the Democratic nomination in the United States presidential election of 1928, in which he won only his own state of Indiana and did not receive the nomination.

== Head coaching record ==
Year	Team	Overall	Conference	Standing	Bowl/playoffs
Wabash (Independent) (1886)
1886	Wabash	2–0–1			
Wabash:		2–0–1			
Indiana Hoosiers (Independent) (1889)
1889	Indiana	0–2			
Indiana:		0–2			
Total:		2–2–1			

Party political offices
Preceded by Samuel M. Ralston	Democratic nominee for United States Senator from Indiana (Class 1); 1926	Succeeded by Albert Stump
