= Richard Lysinger =

American politician (1905–1983)

Member of the Nebraska Legislature
- In office January 1, 1963 – January 3, 1967
- Preceded by: Ernest Staubitz
- Succeeded by: Leslie Robinson
- Constituency: 34th district (1963–1965); 36th district (1965–1967)

Personal details
- Born: February 1, 1905 Phillips, Nebraska
- Died: June 5, 1983 (aged 78) Grand Island, Nebraska
- Party: Republican
- Spouse: Thelma L. Kimball (m. 1925)
- Children: 1 (Betty)
- Occupation: Businessman

Military service
- Allegiance: United States
- Branch/service: United States Army

Richard "Dick" R. Lysinger (February 1, 1905 – June 5, 1983) was a Republican politician from Nebraska who served as a member of the Nebraska Legislature from 1963 to 1967.

== Early life ==
Lysinger was born in Phillips, Nebraska, in 1905, and graduated from Ansley High School in Ansley. He served in the U.S. Army, and upon being discharged, returned to Ansley, where he owned a movie theater. Lysinger and his wife moved to Ravenna, where he owned another theater and served on the School Board.

== Nebraska Legislature ==
In 1962, State Senator Ernest Staubitz declined to seek re-election, and Lysinger ran to succeed him in the 34th district, which included Buffalo and Sherman counties. In the nonpartisan primary, he faced Buffalo County Supervisor O. L. Erickson, real estate broker William Munroe, pharmacist Harold Robbins, and farmer Arthur Shotkoski. Lysinger placed second in the primary, receiving 25 percent of the vote to Erickson's 35 percent. They advanced to the general election, which Lysinger ultimately won, defeating Erickson with 59 percent of the vote.

Lysinger ran for re-election in 1964 in the newly created 36th district, and was challenged by businessman Herman Mattson. Lysinger placed first in the primary by a wide margin, winning 63 percent of the vote to Mattson's 37 percent. In the general election, Lysinger defeated Mattson in a landslide, winning re-election, 65–35 percent.

In 1966, Lysinger declined to run for re-election to a third term, citing "the expense of being away from my business and the pressure of personal affairs."

== Death ==
Lysinger died on June 5, 1983.
