= Leslie Robinson (politician) =

American politician (1906–1997)

Member of the Nebraska Legislature from the 36th district
- In office January 3, 1967 – January 5, 1971
- Preceded by: Richard Lysinger
- Succeeded by: Gerald Stromer

Personal details
- Born: December 28, 1906 Marquette, Michigan
- Died: March 28, 1997 (aged 90) Kearney, Nebraska
- Party: Republican
- Spouse: Charlotte Shovlain (m. 1935)
- Children: 3 (Frank, Elizabeth, Jeanette)
- Education: Kearney State College; University of Nebraska College of Agriculture
- Occupation: Livestock farming

Leslie Robinson (December 28, 1906 – March 28, 1997) was a Republican politician from Nebraska who served as a member of the Nebraska Legislature from the 36th district from 1967 to 1971.

== Early life ==
Robinson was born in Marquette, Michigan, and grew up in Kearney, Nebraska. He graduated from Kearney High School and attended Kearney State College and the University of Nebraska College of Agriculture. Robinson raised Polled Hereford cattle on his farm, some of which were "groomed and fitted for national shows and sales in the late 1940s."

== Nebraska Legislature ==
In 1966, State Senator Richard Lysinger declined to seek re-election, and Robinson ran to succeed him in the 36th district, which included Buffalo and Hall counties. In the primary election, he ran against Ralph Lancaster, the superintendent of the Kearney Water Department, and Gerald Stromer, a counselor at Kearney State College. Robinson placed first in the primary, winning 43 percent of the vote to Lancaster's 30 percent and Stromer's 27 percent, and he advanced to the general election with Lancaster. Robinson narrowly defeated Lancaster, winning 52 percent of the vote to Lancaster's 48 percent.

Robinson ran for re-election in 1970. He was challenged by Stromer and farmer Rudolph Axman. Robinson placed second in the primary election, receiving 42 percent of the vote to Stromer's 46 percent and Axman's 11 percent. The general election between Robinson and Stromer was close, with Robinson narrowly leading on election night but trailing by 26 votes after all votes had been counted. Following a recount, Stromer was confirmed to have defeated Robinson by 23 votes.

== Death ==
Robinson died on March 28, 1997.
