= Arthur Raymond Robinson =

American politician

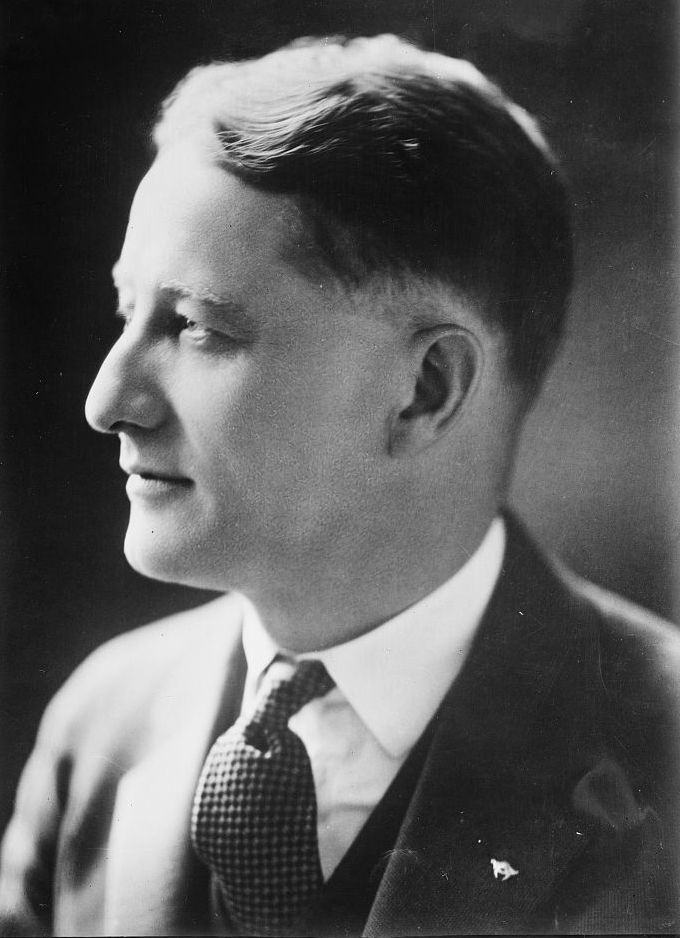
- Robinson c. 1920

United States Senator from Indiana
- In office October 20, 1925 – January 3, 1935
- Preceded by: Samuel M. Ralston
- Succeeded by: Sherman Minton

Member of the Indiana Senate
- In office 1914–1918

Personal details
- Born: March 12, 1881 Pickerington, Ohio, U.S.
- Died: March 17, 1961 (aged 80) Indianapolis, Indiana, U.S.
- Party: Republican
- Education: Ohio Northern University, Indiana Law School, University of Chicago
- Profession: Lawyer

Military service
- Branch/service: United States Army
- Rank: Major
- Battles/wars: World War I

Arthur Raymond Robinson (March 12, 1881 – March 17, 1961) was a United States senator from Indiana.

== Early life ==
Born in Pickerington, Ohio, Robinson graduated from the Ohio Northern University in 1901 (B. Comm. Sci.), the Indiana Law School (now Indiana University Robert H. McKinney School of Law) in Indianapolis in 1910 (LL.B.), and the University of Chicago in 1913 (B.Ph.). He was admitted to the bar in 1910 and commenced practice in Indianapolis.

== Career ==
Robinson was a member of the Indiana Senate from 1914 to 1918, he and was the Republican floor leader during the entire period. During the First World War, he served in the U.S. Army as a first lieutenant, captain, and major, and served in France in the Army of Occupation. He resumed the practice of law and was judge of Marion County Superior Court in 1921–1922. He resumed the practice of law in Indianapolis, in 1922 and was appointed on October 20, 1925, to the U.S. Senate by Governor Edward L. Jackson and subsequently elected on November 2, 1926, in the 1926 United States Senate special election, to fill the vacancy caused by the death of Samuel M. Ralston. He was reelected in 1928, and served from October 20, 1925, to January 3, 1935; in 1934 he was an unsuccessful candidate for reelection. While in the Senate he was chairman of the Committee on Pensions (Seventieth through Seventy-second Congresses).

== Freemasonry ==
As a Freemason, Robinson was a member of Indianapolis' Capital City Lodge, No. 312, where he served as Master in 1916. He became a 33° Scottish Rite Mason in the Valley of Indianapolis in 1924 and served on the Supreme Council of DeMolay between 1925 and 1927. He remained a Mason until his death in 1961, and his grave bears a 33° symbol.

== Death ==
Robinson practiced law in Indianapolis until his death there in 1961. He was buried in Washington Park Cemetery East.

Party political offices
| Preceded by Albert J. Beveridge | Republican nominee for U.S. Senator from Indiana (Class 1); 1926, 1928, 1934 | Succeeded by Raymond E. Willis |
U.S. Senate
| Preceded by Samuel M. Ralston | U.S. senator (Class 1) from Indiana; October 20, 1925 – January 3, 1935; Served alongside: James Eli Watson; Frederick Van Nuys | Succeeded by Sherman Minton |
