= Ron Cope (Nebraska politician) =

American politician (1911–1992)

Member of the Nebraska Legislature from the 36th district
- In office January 8, 1975 – January 5, 1983
- Preceded by: Gerald Stromer
- Succeeded by: Ray Lundy

Personal details
- Born: February 23, 1911 Pawnee County, Nebraska
- Died: January 12, 1992 (aged 80) Kearney, Nebraska
- Party: Republican
- Spouse: Carol Schrepel (m. 1939)
- Education: Peru State College
- Occupation: Businessman

Ron Cope (February 23, 1911 – January 12, 1992) was a Republican politician from Nebraska who served as a member of the Nebraska Legislature from the 36th district from 1975 to 1983.

== Early life ==
Cope was born in Pawnee County, Nebraska, in 1911. He graduated from Burchard High School in 1939, and then from Peru State College. After graduating, he taught in Pawnee County and Burchard. Cope began working for the O'Connor Department Store in North Platte, and left to become the manager of Clausen's Shoe Store in Kearney. He became a co-owner of the store, and after Claussen's death in 1955, opened stores in Holdrege and Lexington.

== Nebraska Legislature ==
In 1974, when incumbent State Senator Gerald Stromer opted to run for the 3rd congressional district, Cope ran to succeed him in the 36th district, which included Buffalo and Kearney counties. In the nonpartisan primary, Cope faced George Boucher and Jack Carey, both of whom were farmers, as well as Bill Beltzer, who dropped out of the race and endorsed Cope, but whose name remained on the ballot. Cope placed first in the primary by a wide margin, winning 47 percent of the vote, and advanced to the general election with Carey, who placed second with 21 percent. In the general election, Cope defeated Carey with 56 percent of the vote.

Cope ran for re-election in 1978. He was challenged by Bill McMullen, a Kearney State College student and law clerk. Cope placed first in the primary, winning 72 percent of the vote to McMullen's 28 percent. He defeated McMullen by a landslide in the general election, receiving 61 percent of the vote to McMullen's 39 percent.

In 1982, Cope declined to seek re-election to a third term.

== Death and legacy ==
Cope died on January 12, 1992. He and his wife were philanthropists in Kearney and donated to the University of Nebraska at Kearney, which named its football stadium and the driving range facility at the Nebraska Safety Center for them.
