= Lorraine Langford =

American politician (1923–1998

Member of the Nebraska Legislature from the 36th district
- In office January 7, 1987 – January 9, 1991
- Preceded by: Ray Lundy
- Succeeded by: Jim D. Cudaback

Personal details
- Born: November 1, 1923 Platte County, Nebraska
- Died: December 26, 1998 (aged 75) Longwood, Florida
- Party: Republican
- Spouse: John Den Langford (m. 1946)
- Children: 3 (Jean, John, Tracy)
- Education: University of Nebraska; University of Southern California
- Occupation: Homemaker, activist

Lorraine Langford (November 1, 1923 – December 26, 1998) was a Republican politician from Nebraska who served as a member of the Nebraska Legislature from the 36th district from 1987 to 1991.

Langford was born in Platte County, Nebraska, and attended the University of Nebraska and University of Southern California. She served as the president of the Nebraska Federation of Republican Women.

In 1982, she ran for the Legislature from the 36th district, but narrowly lost in the general election to Ray Lundy. When Lundy declined to seek re-election in 1986, Langford ran to succeed him, and narrowly defeated James Knapp in the general election. She ran for re-election in 1990 and was defeated by Jim D. Cudaback.

Langford died on December 26, 1998, in Longwood, Florida.
